= Leicester station (disambiguation) =

Leicester station could refer to:

- Leicester railway station, a railway station in Leicester, England, formerly on the MR
  - Leicester Campbell Street railway station, a former name for the above
  - Leicester London Road railway station, a former name for the above
- Leicester Central railway station, a former GCR station in Leicester, England
- Leicester North railway station, a heritage railway station
- Leicester station (New York), a disused station in Leicester, New York
