= BR Standard Class 5 73156 =

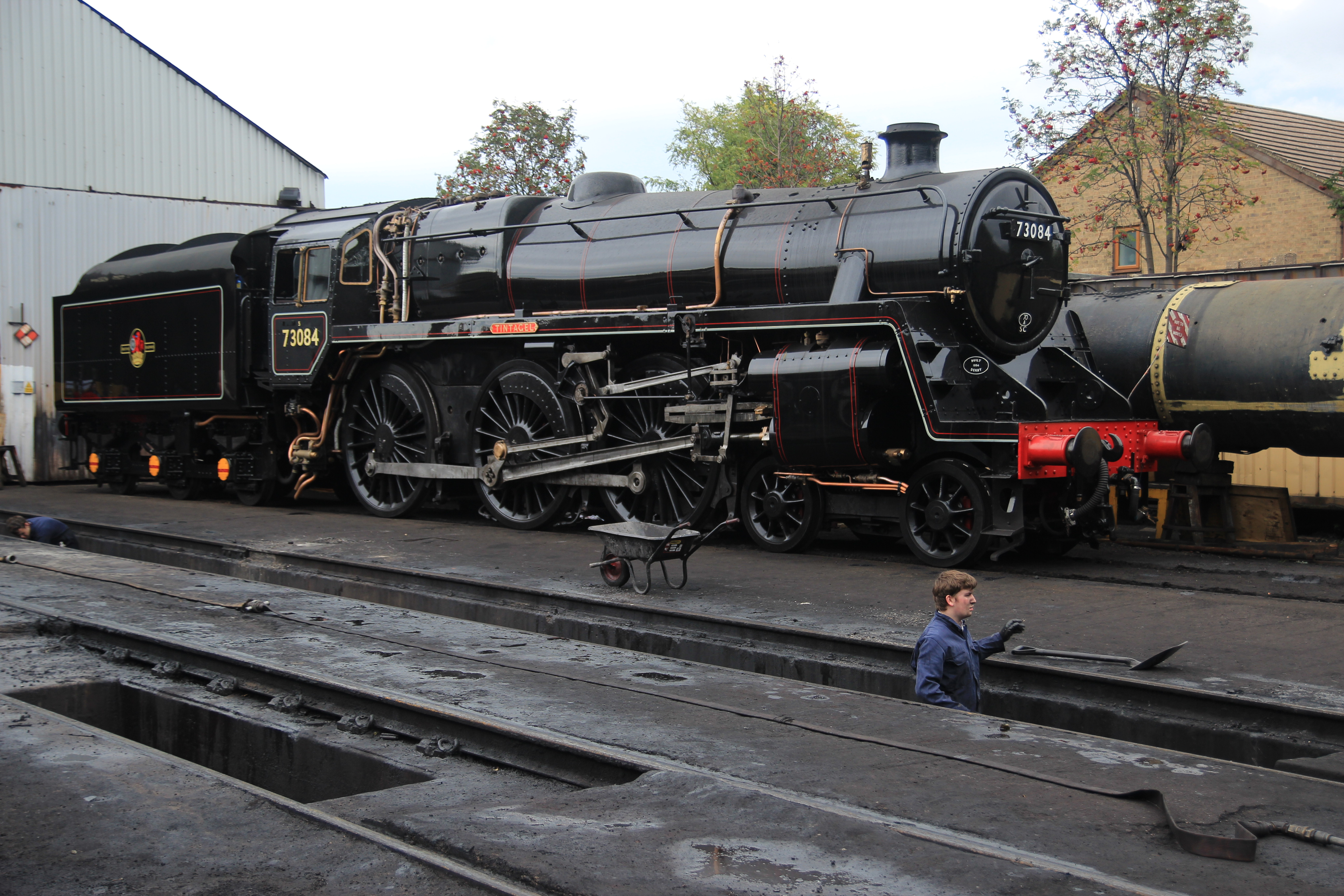
73156 "Tintagel" at the Great Central Railway Loughborough in October 2017, shortly after completion.

British Railways Standard Class 5 No. 73156 is a preserved British steam locomotive. Its restoration at Loughborough on the Great Central Railway was completed in 2017, and it made its formal debut on 5 October 2017 in the guise of 73084 Tintagel. 73156 is the sole surviving BR Standard locomotive built at Doncaster Works. It had been allocated to two GCR sheds (Leicester and Woodford Halse)

Allocations:

Code	Shed	Time
34E	Neasden	December 1956 – April 1958
41C	Sheffield Millhouses	April 1958 – January 1959
41B	Sheffield Grimesthorpe	January 1959 – September 1960
17A	Derby	part of September 1960
14D	Neasden (new LMR code)	September 1960 – June 1962
15E	Leicester G.C.	June 1962 – March 1963
2F	Woodford Halse	March 1963 – May 1963
14A	Cricklewood	May 1963 – October 1964
2L	Leamington Spa	October 1964 – June 1965
2A	Tyseley	June 1965 – April 1966
9K	Bolton	April 1966 – November 1967

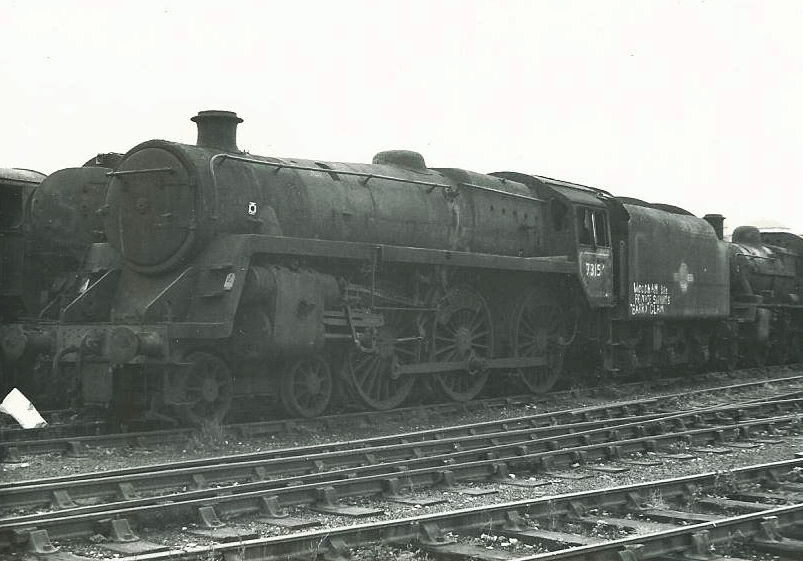

73156 was withdrawn from Bolton on 24 October 1967, and was subsequently sold to Woodham Brothers scrapyard in South Wales, moving there in late January 1968.

== Preservation ==
73156 avoided the cutters torch at Woodham's, and was bought by the Bolton Steam Locomotive Co Ltd, moving from Barry in November 1985. 73156 was initially based at the East Lancashire Railway in Bury, (and indeed much of the associated rolling stock owned by members still lives there).

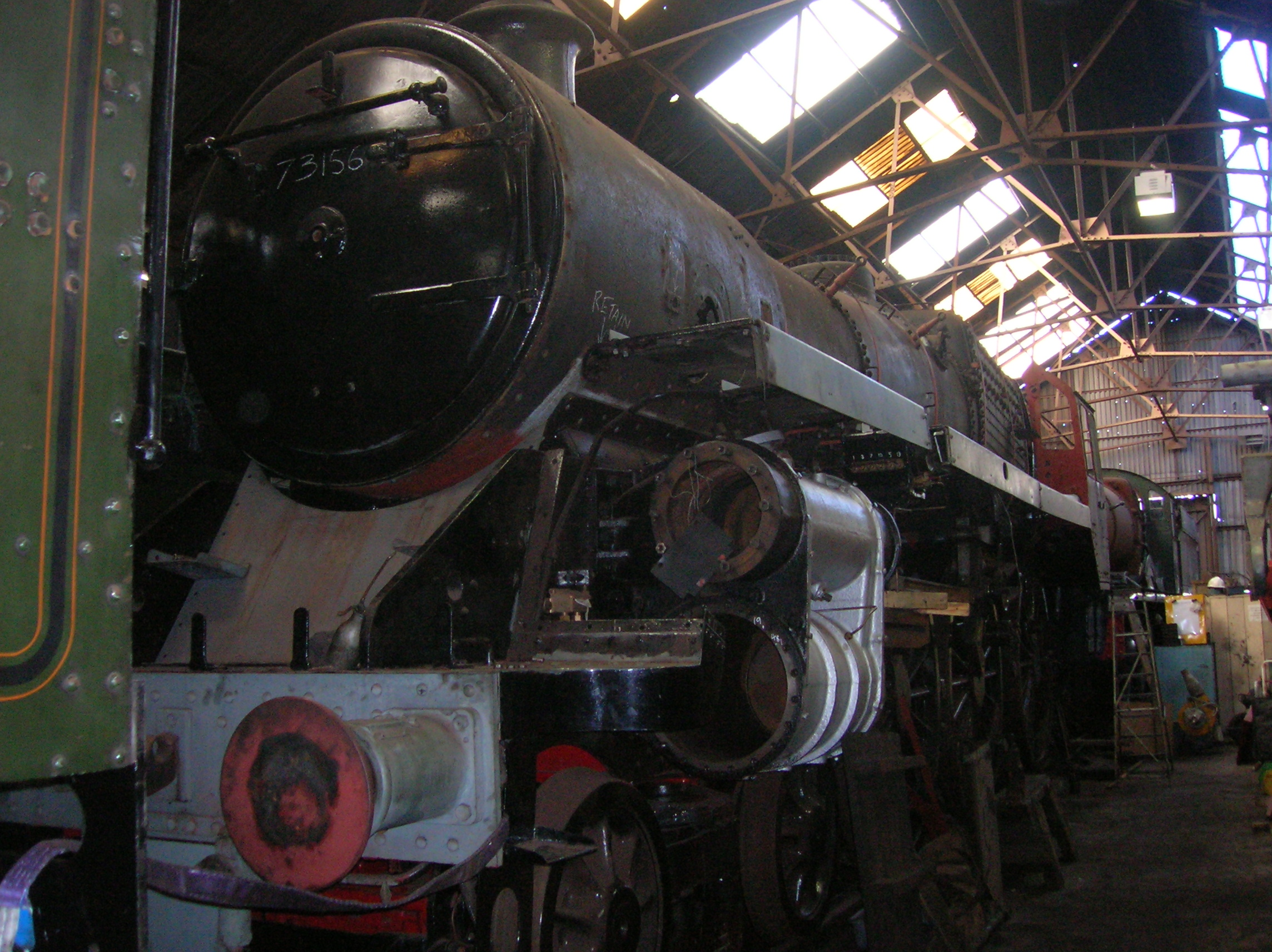
73156 at Loughborough on 16 August 2009. At this particular time the boiler was on the frames to allow tube work to be carried out, but it will need to be removed at one point to re-commence restoration.

The restoration inside the shed at Loughborough was completed in 2017, along with a new BR1B Tender to replace the original, which was sold off while the locomotive was at Barry. In the latter stages of restoration new components were manufactured and fitted to the cab. These were a duplex ejector, sanding valves and a blower, all of which are new to the design, similar to that of 60163 Tornado. This would make it more suitable for mainline work than the other four preserved Standard 5s, but the restoration group has not publicly released any intentions to do this.
