= Great Central Railway (heritage railway) =

Heritage railway based in Loughborough, England

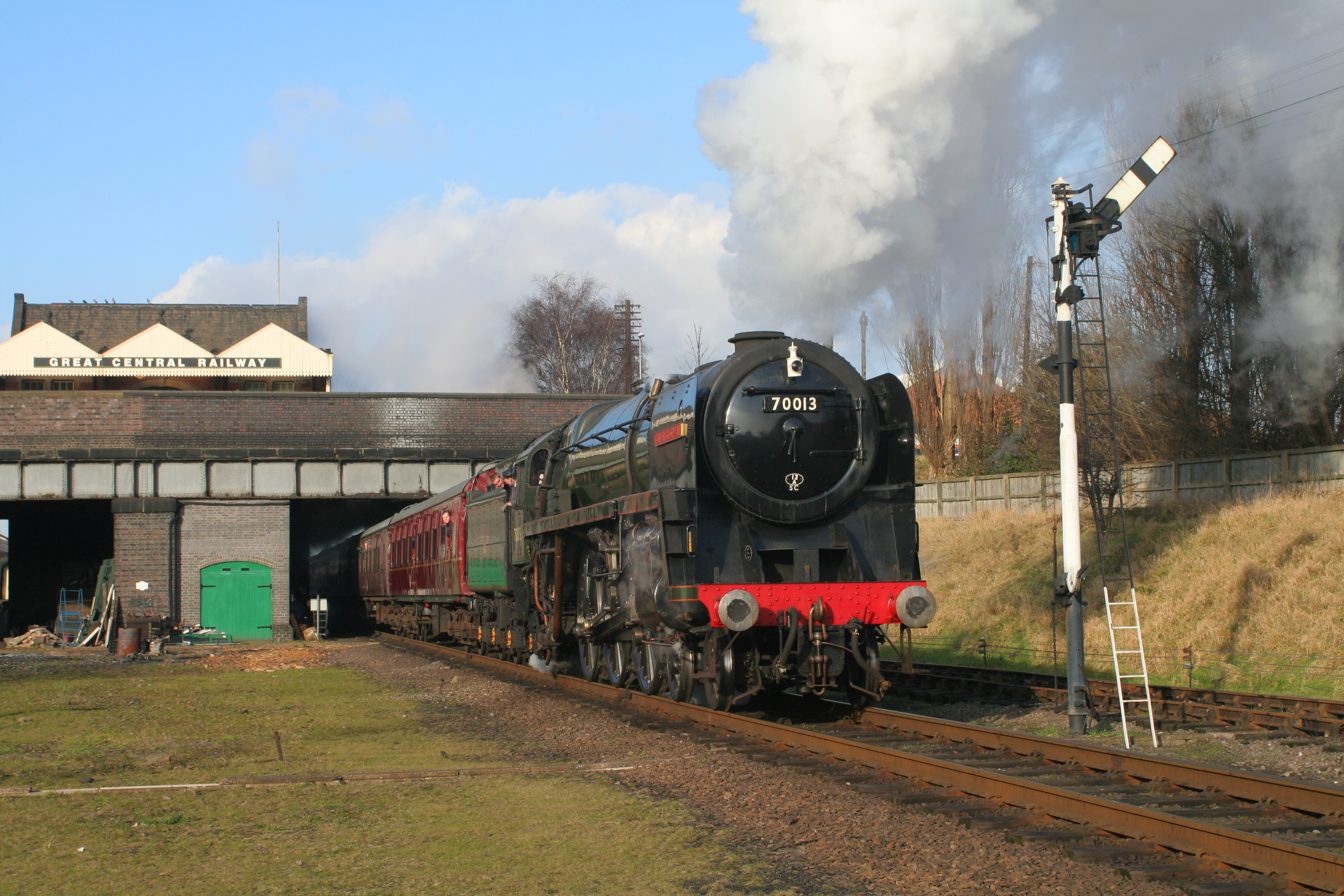
- BR Standard Class 7 70013 Oliver Cromwell leaving Loughborough
- Locale: Loughborough, Leicestershire, England
- Terminus: Leicester North

Commercial operations
- Built by: Edward Watkin; Manchester, Sheffield and Lincolnshire Railway
- Original gauge: 4 ft 8 1/2 in (1,435 mm) standard gauge

Preserved operations
- Operated by: Great Central Railway plc
- Stations: 4
- Length: 8 miles (13 km) (Leicester); 10 miles (16 km) (Nottingham)
- Preserved gauge: 4 ft 8 1/2 in (1,435 mm) standard gauge

Commercial history
- Opened: 1897
- Closed: 17 March 1969

Preservation history
- 23 March 1974: GCR reopened
- 1976: GCR plc formed
- 2000: Double track opened
- 2012: Swithland Sidings opened to the public
- Headquarters: Loughborough Central & Ruddington

Website
- https://www.gcrailway.co.uk/

The Great Central Railway (GCR) is a heritage railway in Leicestershire, England, named after the company that originally built this section of railway. It runs for 8 miles (13 km) between the town of Loughborough and a new terminus in the north of Leicester. It has period signalling, locomotives and rolling stock.

Four stations are in operation, each restored to a period in the railway's commercial history: Loughborough Central (the 1950s); Quorn & Woodhouse (Second World War and the remainder of the 1940s); Rothley (Edwardian Era); Leicester North (the 1960s).

The railway is currently involved in a major project to rebuild the missing line, known as the Loughborough Gap, between Loughborough and the Great Central Railway (Nottingham).

== Background history ==
In 1897, the Great Central Railway itself was formed, becoming the last steam mainline in the United Kingdom. Two years later in 1899, "The London Extension" was officially opened to passenger and freight traffic, allowing more direct journeys from the capital to Nottingham, Leicester, Sheffield and Manchester. This construction scheme was devised by chairman Sir Edward Watkin, who had envisioned his railway one day running through a channel tunnel to France, linking Britain with the continent.

However, this never came to fruition; indeed, the Beeching report which led to cutback and closure was published in 1963, some 31 years before the tunnel was fully constructed. In the report, the line was described as a duplicate of the Midland Main Line. Apart from the most southerly section into London, the line was closed as a through route in 1966 as part of the Beeching Axe, although a section of the line between Nottingham and Rugby remained open until 1969. The closure became one of Doctor Beeching's largest cutbacks.

== Preservation ==
In the late 1960s, local groups who opposed the closure gathered together for a series of meetings at Leicester Central railway station and the Main Line Preservation Group (MLPG) was formed. There had been talk of restoring the entire closed line from Nottingham Arkwright Street to Rugby Central, but this was rationalised to a section from Ruddington to Leicester and later, because British Rail retained the single track between Loughborough and Ruddington for British Gypsum freight and access to the now-closed Ministry of Defence base, the group's plans focussed on the Loughborough to Leicester section. The published aim of MLPG was "to acquire a suitable length of main line, for the operation of steam hauled passenger trains, at realistic speeds". Work began on salvaging as much reusable material as possible for the project from the recent demolitions.

=== The early years (1969–1976) ===
The MLPG received a lease on the station, buildings and most of the trackbed at Loughborough Central in 1970; this would become its base of operations. By the following year, negotiations into purchasing the rest of the remaining railway had proven successful and the group was able to buy it for a mere £75,000 (£948,000 in 2025). The rest of the Loughborough yard complex was secured in 1972. In the same year, the first coaching stock arrived on site. The first open day occurred in 1973, shortly after the arrival of working motive power. Passengers were offered simple wagon or coach rides run by small industrial locomotives. On 30 September 1973, LMS Stanier Class 5 4-6-0 No. 5231 hauled the first passenger train since the railway's commercial closure, to Quorn and back, but at the same time the down line was being lifted between Birstall and Quorn because of BR's increasing demands.

To purchase what was left of the track, the MLPG was re-merged into a supporting charity, the Main Line Steam Trust (MLST). The entire value of the eight miles (13 km) of up line was re-assessed by BR at £279,000 (£3,034,000 in 2025) and the MLST was now paying £3,300 a month (£33,000 in 2025) just to keep it. A deal was struck on 1 April 1976 that would see the remainder of the down line lifted if BR's cash demand was not raised. At that time, passenger trains were still running as far as Rothley, but, without an adequate supply of working mainline locomotives, the trust had to resort to using industrial tank engines working single track – some way short of the original vision of the MLPG seven years previously.

=== Great Central Railway PLC ===
To purchase the land and track, Great Central Railway (1976) PLC issued shares, and the MLPG was transformed into the MLST, a charitable body, to support the company.

Charnwood Borough Council agreed to purchase the land from BR and lease it to the railway for 99 years. However, this still left GCR (1976) PLC the task of raising over £150,000 (£1,011,000 in 2025) to purchase the track. Ultimately, the target was not met and only a single track between Loughborough and Quorn could be afforded (BR allowed more time to raise funds to purchase Quorn to Rothley). The double track from Rothley to Belgrave & Birstall was lifted, along with the 'down' line from Loughborough to Rothley.

In the late 1980s, the intention was announced to extend the line back to Belgrave & Birstall. The former station had been vandalised and the Railway had no choice but to demolish the buildings. In 1990, a station called Leicester North was opened a hundred metres to the south of Belgrave & Birstall. This shift in location placed the new station inside Leicester's city boundary, allowing the 'Leicester' tag to be included in the name, along with unlocking extra funds to assist in the construction.

=== The double track project (1991-present day) ===
In the 1990s David Clarke became president of the GCR and approached the railway about the possibility of double-tracking the line. As a signalling enthusiast, Clarke aspired to operate a signal box on a double track main line, and so the campaign to raise funds to double the section between Quorn and Rothley was launched, with Clarke himself providing a large amount of the capital.

After reaching Quorn, work moved ahead to extend the second track to Loughborough. The double track between Loughborough and Rothley opened on 1 June 2000. This gave additional capacity, which is especially useful at galas, where up to six trains may be in operation at any one time. This enables the running of non-passenger-carrying trains (freights, TPO set) during galas to a greater extent than any other heritage railway. It also means that the timetable can be generally adhered to, as delays do not cascade, as they do on single track lines.

Her Majesty's Rail Inspectorate has granted powers to run private test trains at up to 60 mph. Other special trains at public events run at up to 45 miles per hour (72.4 km/h). Typically, UK heritage railways are limited to a maximum speed of 25 miles per hour (40.2 km/h).

In 2004, a new signal box at Quorn opened, at that time the only preserved box in the UK with a double track on either side. With this new signal box, a train can, in theory, be dispatched from Loughborough every 10 minutes. A further signal box at Swithland Sidings has been fitted with Great Western Railway style signals, in the style of the GCR/GWR joint line via High Wycombe, allowing for a further capacity increase on the preserved GCR. The full Swithland project was completed in May 2012.

On 5 December 2012, the GCR was awarded the NRHA Signalling Award for this long-running and complicated project.

In 2016 the BBC reported that GCR and GCRN claimed that it was 'the only place in the world where full size steam engines can be seen passing each other'.

== Major engineering projects ==
=== The gap and Loughborough Midland (High Level) ===
Abutment for the missing bridge over Railway Terrace. This bridge needs to be replaced if the gap is to be bridged.

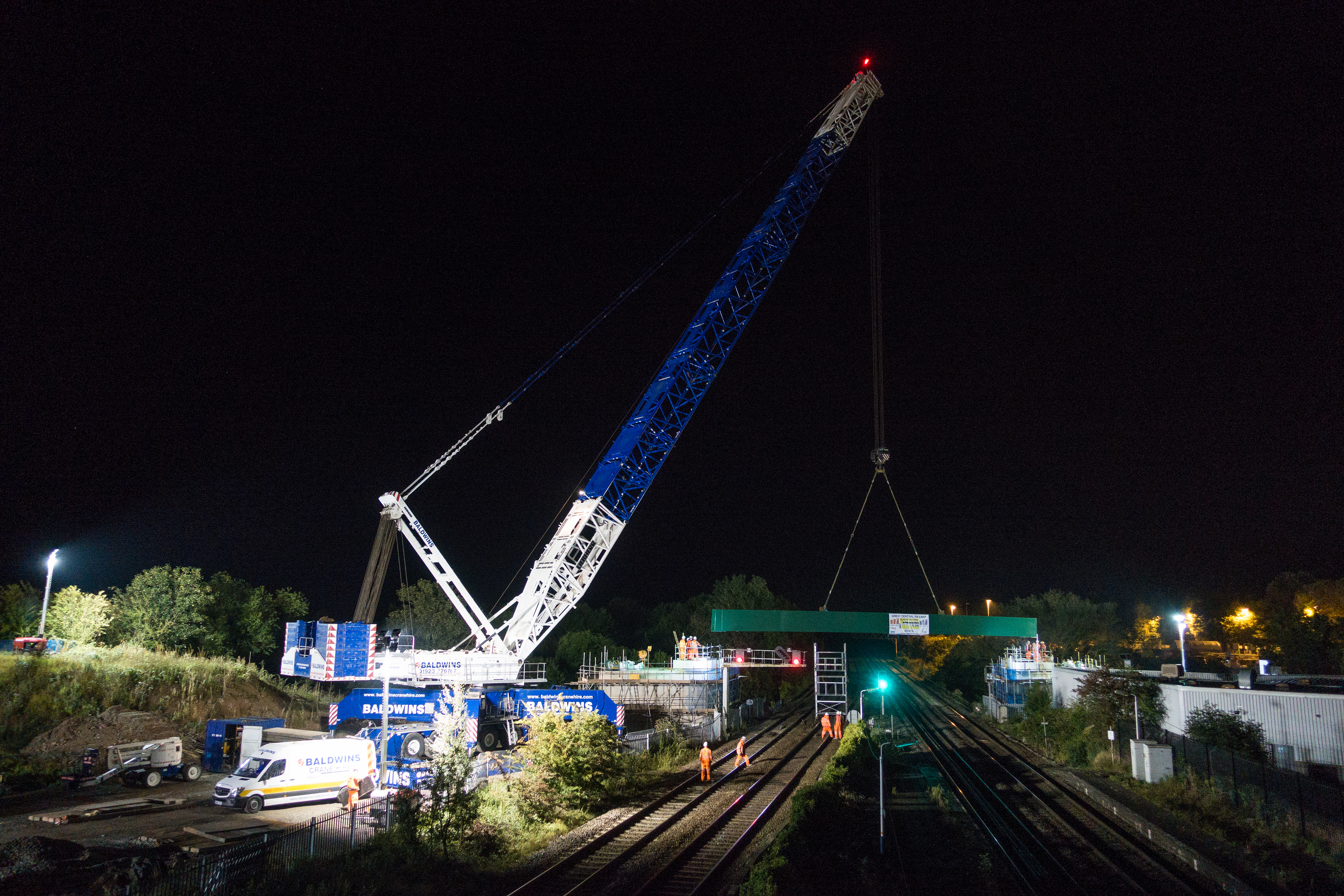
Section of the new bridge to carry the Great Central Railway over Midland Main Line being installed in the early morning of 3rd September 2017

Approximately 500 metres (0.3 mi) separates the GCR to the south from another stretch of the former railway to the north, operated by the Great Central Railway (Nottingham), formerly known as the Nottingham Heritage Railway. "The Gap" from the GCR's Loughborough locomotive shed to where the line crosses the A60 is a section of embankment and bridges (including a large single span over the Midland Main Line) that would need to be reinstated to join the two concerns together. If completed, the GCRN would merge with the GCR to create a single 18-mile (29 km) track (the Greater Great Central Railway (GGCR), as it is known almost universally by Great Central staff), which would also be rebuilt as a double-track line for most, if not the whole, of its length.

The project has been moving forward steadily since February 2009, when it was announced that it would receive £350,000 for a feasibility study, Charnwood Borough Council having won a grant from the East Midlands Development Agency, with the GCR to contribute £100,000 towards a combined cost of £450,000 for the study.

As of 2022:

- A new (single-track) bridge over the Midland Main Line was completed in 2017 at a cost of about £3 million. The new bridge has been built with increased clearances to accommodate proposed future electrification of the Midland Main Line.
- In 2020 work was completed on refurbishing the bridge over the Grand Union Canal, at a cost of £475,000.
- In October/November 2022 the existing bridge over the A60, which had been damaged by corrosion and by repeated vehicle impacts, was replaced by a new twin-track structure, at a cost in excess of £1 million.

Remaining stages include a bridge over Railway Terrace and a 'flyover' over a factory car-park immediately to the north of it (together projected to cost £3 million), plus work to reinstate embankments to the north and south of the new bridges. It is proposed that work on the embankments will use current construction techniques to provide a higher but narrower structure than the original; while the Railway Terrace bridge is proposed to re-use one of two 17-metre road bridges removed as part of reconstruction work at Reading station in 2011 and made available by Network Rail to the project.

Earlier plans also suggested for the Nottingham side of the railway to build a new station, Loughborough High Level, immediately to the north of the Midland Main Line, which could be completed before the other works, and provide passengers with an easy walking connection to and from Loughborough main-line station. This has not so far been taken forward.

In March 2024, it was announced that Loughborough Central locomotive shed- which lies over the original rail track north of Loughborough- is to be relocated as part of the railways unification project.

=== The Mountsorrel Railway Project ===
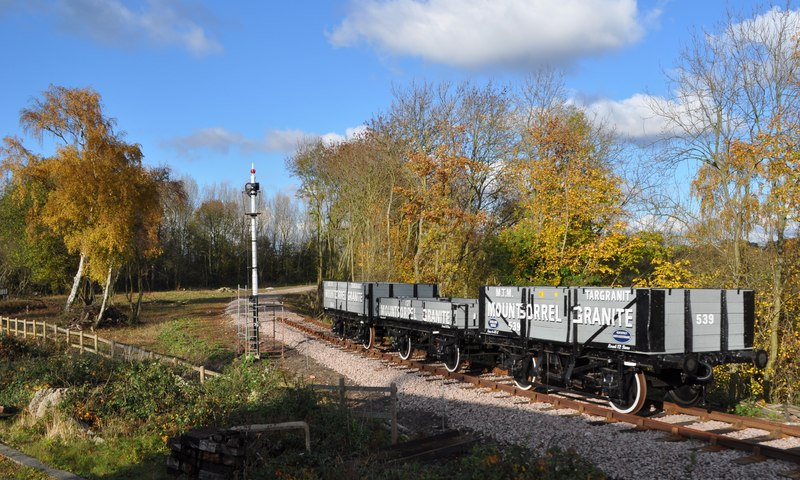
The Line and Wagons at Swithland Junction in November 2010

The Mountsorrel Railway project was originally devised and financed by Railway Vehicle Preservations Limited and aimed to rebuild the Mountsorrel branch off the Great Central railway at Swithland sidings to the working Mountsorrel quarry.

In 2006, the branch was essentially intact but the track was lifted in the mid-1960s. The original purpose of the reinstatement was to provide a carriage shed to house the restored carriages of Railway Vehicle Preservations Ltd and shelter them from the elements. In 2006, Railway Vehicle Preservations Limited applied for planning permission for the shed, but this was rejected due to badger setts discovered on site. The reinstatement of the line went ahead, instead being carried out by a separate group, the Mountsorrel Railway Project, directed by Steve Cramp. Work commenced in 2008 with the aim of relaying 1.25 miles (2 km) of line up to the bridge at Bond Lane, where a platform was planned to be built. By 2012, the line had been fully ballasted for half of its length, passing through Wood Lane Bridge and across into Mountsorrel Parish. RVP re-evaluated their plans for the shed at the end of the branch line, instead deciding upon putting an application in for a four road shed at the back of Swithland sidings. On 4 February 2013 the ambitious plans were given conditional approval.

After eight years and over 80,000 hours of volunteer time, the Mountsorrel Railway was opened to the public over the weekend of 24 and 25 October 2015 by Richard Faulkner, Baron Faulkner of Worcester, who is president of the Heritage Railway Association and vice chairman of the Science Museum.

Following the opening of the railway, the Mountsorrel Railway Project changed direction, evolving into the Mountsorrel and Rothley Community Heritage Centre, which now occupies the former site of Nunckley Quarry.

Recently Lafarge, (operators of the Mountsorrel Quarry) proposed a stone loading terminal at the end of the Mountsorrel Railway. This was in response to a planning submission to build 300+ Houses near to the proposed Bond Lane Station, and was clearly aimed at Lafarge protecting the mineral extraction rights. The proposal would be dependent on the GCR 'Bridging the Gap' to GCRN. GCR then would build a north chord from the southern end of Swithland Viaduct to meet the existing track just at the end of the straight section of the Mountsorrel Railway. The proposal estimates that 3 loaded trains of 1000 tonnes would leave the proposed terminal every weekday and travel via the GCR to the Midland Main Line Connection.

== Stations and notable locations ==
=== Loughborough Central ===
Loughborough Central is the largest of the working stations on the line and the headquarters of the railway. It is the current northern terminus of the line. It features two numbered platforms between the running lines in an island configuration. On the platforms are a museum, gift shop, refreshment room, waiting room and toilet facilities. To the north of the station is the railway's motive power depot and a signal box. The station is presented as it would have been in the 1950s under British Railways.

=== Quorn and Woodhouse ===
Quorn and Woodhouse station is an island platform station with a large goods yard to the east, which is today used as car parking and for special events. The platforms feature two waiting rooms, toilet facilities, booking office and a tearoom under the road bridge. The goods yard has a signal box, tea room and the railway's turntable. The goods yard was enlarged during the second world war and as a result of this connection, the station is set in the 1940s period, when it was operated by the London and North Eastern Railway.

=== Swithland Sidings ===
Swithland Sidings is the location of two loops, a series of sidings and the point where the branch to Mountsorrel diverges from the main line. There is a signal box at this location and it is used as the turn-around point for goods trains on gala days. There is no station at Swithland Sidings and it is not accessible to the public and it is only visible from passing trains.

=== Rothley ===
Rothley station is similar in overall layout to that of Quorn and Woodhouse. It has an island platform with a booking office, waiting room, tea room and toilet facilities. In the former goods yard is an old coal and corn store which, from 2008 until 2026 was used as a tearoom. The station is presented in the Edwardian era when it was operated by the Great Central Railway company. The station is entirely lit with gas lamps.

=== Leicester North ===
The original station at this location was Belgrave and Birstall station, however this had to be demolished in stages between 1977 and 1985 after the buildings were left in a dangerous state due to vandalism. In 1991 a new station was built and was called Leicester North. This functions as the southern terminus of the line and is presented in a maroon colour scheme, generally reflecting the 1950s.

== Accidents and incidents ==
- On 7 March 1976, no. 377 "King Haakon VII" was near Loughborough Central when a fusible plug blew out of the locomotive's boiler into the firebox. This caused steam, boiling water and burning coal to be jettisoned through the firehole into the locomotive cab, causing serious injuries to two of the four footplate crew. The cause of the incident was determined to be that the fusible plug was fitted by an unqualified person using unsuitable tools for the work.
- On 4 February 2006, LMS Stanier Class 5 4-6-0 locomotive 45305 Alderman A. E. Draper collided with a rake of six carriages at Loughborough Central, damaging the locomotive and one of the carriages. Two people were injured. An investigation by the Rail Accident Investigation Branch (RAIB) found that the driver was not wearing spectacles at the time of the accident, despite it being a requirement on his medical certificate to do so when driving. No testing was carried out by the GCR on the train crew for drug or alcohol use. There was no first aid kit carried on the locomotive, although this was recommended by Her Majesty's Railway Inspectorate for all locomotives. The RAIB made four recommendations as a result of the accident.
- On 27 April 2013, LMS Ivatt Class 2 2-6-0 46521 was derailed on trap points at Quorn & Woodhouse. The accident was filmed by a visitor to the railway whose film clearly shows the train departing from a loop against a danger signal. This had been authorised by the signalman as the signal was not working. However the signalman failed to close the trap point and the driver failed to check the trap point in accordance with the rules. The incident was not investigated by the RAIB.
- On 12 May 2014, Class 37 diesel electric locomotive 37198 ran away from Quorn & Woodhouse pushing a TPO carriage . They collided with a rake of five carriages at Loughborough Central. The RAIB investigation into the accident, published on 21 May 2015, found that the accident was caused by the train being stabled in an ineffective manner to protect it from a runaway. Additional factors were that there was no brake van in the train, contrary to GCR rules, and that the train was left parked in a position where there was no runaway protection, such as catch points, available. The RAIB made four recommendations as a result of the accident.
- On 14 January 2023, a passenger sustained serious injuries alighting from a train at Loughborough Central. The RAIB opened an investigation into the accident. As a result of the accident, the RAIB issued urgent safety advice to heritage railways on 29 March.

== Film and television ==
Many filmmakers have taken advantage of the atmosphere of the Great Central and it has had many notable appearances in film and television.

=== Film ===
- Buster (1988)
- Shadowlands (1993)
- The Secret Agent (1996)
- The Navigators (2001)
- Enigma (2001)
- The Hours (2002)
- Control (2007)
- A Boy Called Dad (2009)
- Cemetery Junction (2010)
- Stan & Ollie (2018)

=== TV ===
- She's Out (1995)
- Woof! (1995)
- Goodnight Mr. Tom (1998)
- Take a Girl Like You (2000)
- The Cazalet Chronicles (2001)
- Casualty (2001, 2014)
- Hawking (2004)
- 4:50 from Paddington (2004)
- E=mc^{2} (2005)
- The 39 Steps (2008)
- Central Steam (2010)
- South Riding (2011)
- Top Gear (2011)
- Ripper Street (2012)
- Heston's Fantastical Food (2012)
- Our Story (2013)
- Great British Railway Journeys (2013)
- The Crown (2017–2023)

=== Music video ===
- Stereophonics – Indian Summer (2013)
- Louise Steel – Take Off And Busk (2015)

== Locomotives and rolling stock ==
Some of Britain's largest locomotives have been there. The steam fleet comprises several mainline classes, many of them either heavy freight, express passenger or shunting tank engines. Some are of types that were preserved in abundance elsewhere, but others have been leased from the National Collection. The railway also has a fleet of diesel locomotives, ranging from Class 08 shunters to Class 37 and Class 50's. As of 7 October 2022 the railway had only a few diesel locos serviceable. These were D123 (45 125), 37 714, D6700 (37 119/37 350). Locos such as the 20,25,47,50 and others are all withdrawn for repairs. As well as running stock the railway also has a collection of heritage rolling stock. Passenger stock is made up of uniform rakes of British Rail Mark 1 coaches originally built in the 1950s and 60s. They either carry Maroon, Carmine and Cream, Western Region Chocolate and Cream, or Great Central Pullman liveries.

== Supporting bodies ==
Both the Great Central Railway PLC and the Great Central Railway (Nottingham) have a number of supporting bodies which are based at each individual line. The majority of these are locomotive or rolling stock groups, however there are a number of private owners who have based their stock or locomotives at the lines.

=== Main Line Steam Trust ===
Main Line Steam Trust was established in 1969 as the Main Line Preservation Group, with the intention of preserving one of two potential sections of the line, one based at Lutterworth, running from Leicester to Rugby Central, and one based at Loughborough, running between Leicester and Nottingham. The Loughborough base was chosen and work began on restoring the station, an office was rented at street level at Loughborough Central station, and in 1971 Charitable Status was granted to MLPG, who changed their name to Main Line Steam Trust Limited.

Substantial monthly payments were required to keep the formation intact between Loughborough and Belgrave & Birstall, with steam hauled services operating from Loughborough Central to Quorn & Woodhouse Station, and eventually Rothley station. The money required to purchase the line south of Rothley was not available and only the Loughborough to Rothley section of line was preserved, with the aid of Charnwood Borough Council.

The operation and the assets were transferred to the Great Central Railway (1976) Ltd. and MLST took on the role of the charitable volunteer-run support body for the railway. MLST has continued to support the Great Central Railway PLC (the 1976 was eventually dropped from the title), and the various organisations around the railway. It also supports the Great Central Railway (Nottingham).

MLST have funded at the Great Central Railway, including assistance in funding the double track, Leicester Station, Quorn & Woodhouse Signalling, Swithland Signalling, Loughborough South Remodelling, and has assisted in bringing in visiting locomotives for gala events.

MLST has been incorporated into The Friends of the Great Central Main Line (FoGCML), this with the David Clarke Railway Trust (DCRT) provide the volunteers and the funding. Outside commercial interests and individuals are able to donate toward various projects.

=== Great Central Railway PLC ===
==== The Gresley Society ====
A small group based at Loughborough who are devoted to LNER Chief Mechanical Engineer, Sir Nigel Gresley. They also own large suburban tank locomotive GNR Class N2 No. 1744.

==== Renaissance Railcars ====
Renaissance Railcars own the six Class 101 vehicles, and the sole surviving Class 111 vehicle at the Great Central Railway, two sets are in passenger use consisting of a green three car set, and a blue two car set.

==== Boscastle Locomotive Syndicate ====
Owners and carers of Bulleid Pacific locomotive 34039 Boscastle.

==== 73156 Standard 5 Support Group ====
Formed in 1985, the group owns BR Standard Class 5 73156, and numerous storage vans.

==== Loughborough Standard Locomotive Group ====
Loughborough Standard Locomotive Group, or LSLG, look after and part-own a number of locomotives. These are BR Standard 2MTs Nos.78018 & 78019, BR Standard 5MT No.73156, BR Standard Class 7 70013 Oliver Cromwell and LMS Ivatt Class 2 2-6-0 No.46521

No.70013 "Oliver Cromwell" is part of the national collection, owned by the National Railway Museum, and has been restored by both LSLG and the 5305 Locomotive Association. 'Cromwell'. LSLG also have in their care a Directors Saloon, coach no. M999504, which is on loan from EWS.

==== 5305 Locomotive Association ====
The 5305 Locomotive Association have a number of locomotives in their care, these are LMS Black Five No.45305 "Alderman A.E. Draper", SR King Arthur No.777 "Sir Lamiel", British Rail Class 33 D6535 "Hertfordshire Railtours", BR Standard 7 No.70013 "Oliver Cromwell", and British Rail Class 45 "Leicestershire And Derbyshire Yeomanry" Peak D123.

Nos.777, D6535 and 70013 are all part of the National Collection and are owned by the National Railway Museum.

==== Type One Locomotive Company ====
A diesel group who own and care for Class 20 D8098, Class 31 D5380 and Class 47 D1705.

==== Railway Vehicle Preservations Ltd ====
Railway Vehicle Preservations Ltd, and their members, own a collection of LNER coaches in preservation. These include the famous LNER Travelling Post Office set, two LNER Beavertail observation saloon (including one in its rebuilt condition), and a number of "Gresley" teak-panel passenger coaches.

==== Quorn Wagon and Wagon ====
A group dedicated to the restoration of steam era goods rolling stock. Responsible for over 75 privately owned vehicles which make up the majority of the boxvan, mixed freight and permanent way trains, as well as four of the brake vans in operation on the railway. Restoration activity is centered around the southern section of Quorn and Woodhouse station yard.
