= Quorn and Woodhouse railway station =

Heritage station on the Great Central Railway in England

Quorn and Woodhouse
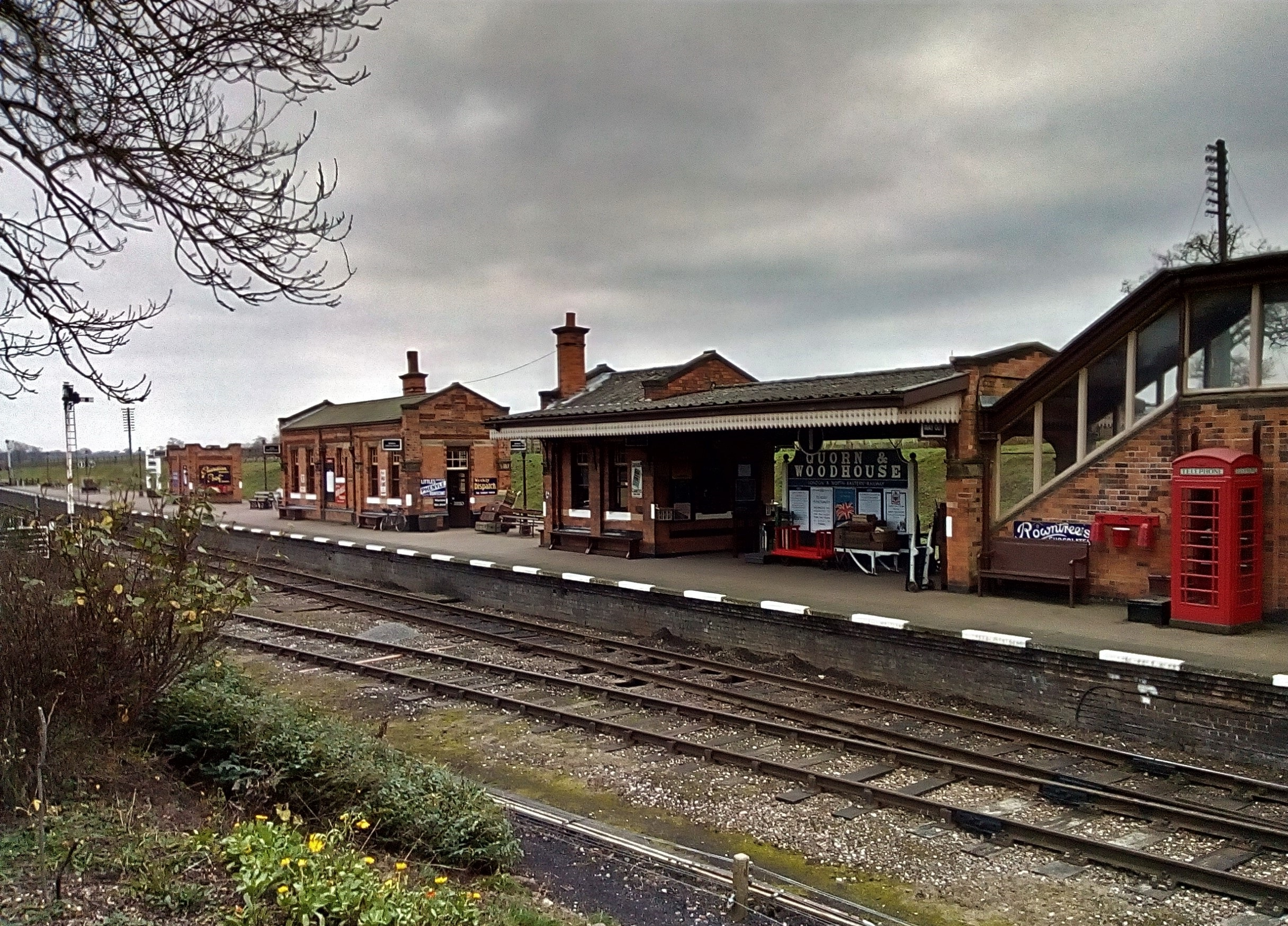
- The station in January 2019

General information
- Location: Quorn, Charnwood; England
- Coordinates: 52.7403°N 1.1878°W
- Grid reference: SK549161
- System: Station on heritage railway
- Operator: Great Central Railway (preserved)
- Platforms: 2

History
- Original company: Great Central Railway
- Post-grouping: London and North Eastern Railway

Key dates
- 15 March 1899: Opened
- 4 March 1963: Closed
- 23 March 1974: Reopened as a heritage station
Location

Quorn and Woodhouse railway station is a heritage station on the Great Central Railway (preserved) serving the villages of Quorn and Woodhouse in Leicestershire, England. It is situated between Loughborough Central and Rothley. Quorn is laid out to appear as it would in the 1940s, as a typical rural LNER station. The original signal box was demolished following the line's closure; a replacement was obtained from Market Rasen and dates from 1886, making it the oldest structure on the railway.

== History ==
The station was opened in 1899 as part of the London extension of the Manchester, Sheffield and Lincolnshire Railway, which became the Great Central Railway. Following grouping in 1923, the station became part of the London and North Eastern Railway.

The station was used by individuals participating in the nearby Quorn Hunt. One such person was King Edward VIII.

In 1944, the 505th Parachute Infantry Regiment of the US Army 82nd Airborne Division was based in Quorn village. As a result, the station goods yard was used for the offloading and storage of ammunition and military equipment and was enlarged for this purpose.

Upon nationalisation in 1948, the station was allocated to the Eastern Region, before being re-allocated to the Midland Region in 1958. The station retained its original gas lighting until closure on 4 March 1963.

== Present Day ==
The station is grade II listed and has a number of attractions, including the 1940s era NAAFI Tea Room situated underneath the station road bridge, a period Station Master's office, as well as wartime films showing in one of the waiting rooms. In 2011, a new café called Butler-Henderson Tea Rooms was opened; the building, whilst not in keeping with the station itself, complements its surroundings and provides another reason to stop off at the station.

A turntable (60-foot balance model) was delivered to the station in January 2010 from Preston Docks. It had previously seen use in the ex-York Roundhouse in the days of steam. The turntable was built in 1909 by Cowans Sheldon Ltd of Carlisle. Work began on digging the foundations in June 2011 with work being completed during the late summer of that year in time for the annual Steam Railway Magazine gala in early October 2011.

The sidings around the turntable are used by the preservation and restoration group Quorn Wagon and Wagon. This group looks after over 100 freight rail vehicles and supplies the majority of the goods trains seen on the railway.

== In popular culture ==
The station and Great Central Railway line were featured in the fourth episode of the 17th series of BBC's Top Gear programme, shown on 17 July 2011 during a train/car feature, which was filmed in June 2011.

== Route ==
Preceding station	Heritage railways	Following station
Loughborough Central Terminus	Great Central Railway Leicestershire section	Rothley towards Leicester North
Historical railways
Loughborough Central; Line and station open	Great Central Railway; London Extension	Rothley; Line and station open
Aborted plans
Loughborough Central; Line and station open	Great Central Railway; London Extension	Swithland; Line open, Station never opened or completed
