= Barrow-upon-Soar railway station =

Railway station in Leicestershire, England

Coordinates: 52°44′57.88″N 1°8′43.94″W

Barrow-upon-Soar
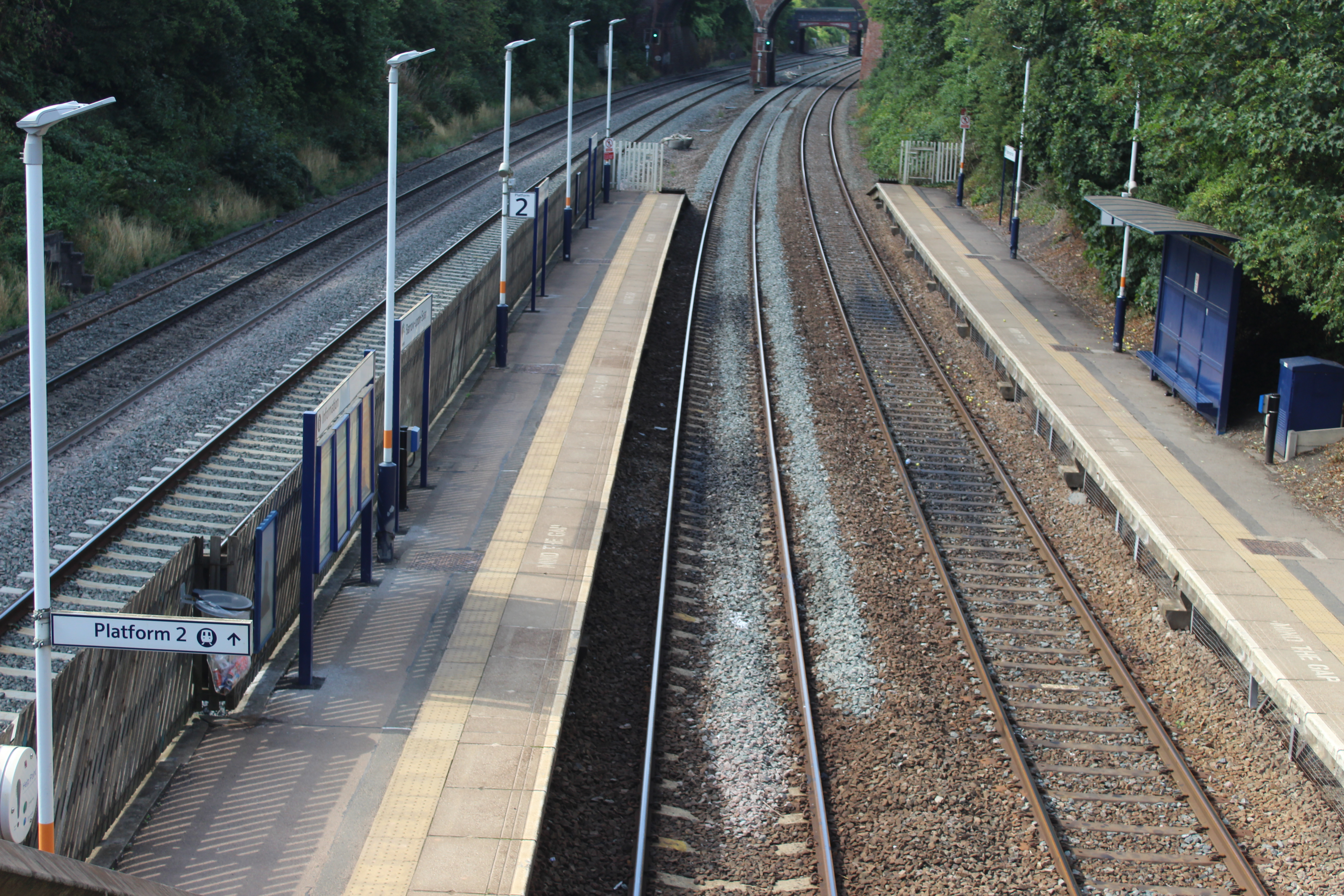

General information
- Location: Barrow-upon-Soar, Borough of Charnwood; England
- Grid reference: SK577172
- Manager: East Midlands Railway
- Platforms: 2
- Tracks: 4

Other information
- Station code: BWS
- Classification: DfT category F2

Key dates
- 1840: Opened as Barrow
- 1871: Renamed Barrow-upon-Soar
- 1899: Renamed Barrow-upon-Soar and Quorn
- 4 March 1968: Closed
- 27 May 1994: Reopened as Barrow-upon-Soar

Passengers
- 2020/21: ▼23,794
- 2021/22: ▲58,688
- 2022/23: ▲75,716
- 2023/24: ▲90,826
- 2024/25: ▲101,842
Location
Notes
- Passenger statistics from the Office of Rail and Road

Barrow-upon-Soar railway station (formerly known as Barrow and Barrow-upon-Soar and Quorn) serves the large village of Barrow-upon-Soar in Leicestershire, England. The station is located on the Midland Main Line between Leicester and Loughborough, 108 miles 52 chains (174.9 km) north of St Pancras.

== History ==
The first station at Barrow was opened in 1840 by the Midland Counties Railway, which shortly joined the North Midland Railway and the Birmingham and Derby Junction Railway to form the Midland Railway.

It was originally known simply as Barrow, but became Barrow-upon-Soar in 1871. When Quorn and Woodhouse was opened by the rival Great Central Railway on the opposite (western) side of Quorn, it became Barrow-upon-Soar and Quorn in 1899. Neither station, in fact, was ideally located for Quorn, being about equidistant from its centre.

Barrow was the only station on the line to retain much of its original MCR architecture. However, it was completely demolished following its closure in 1968.

A new station was opened slightly to the southeast of the original site on 27 May 1994, as part of phase one of the Ivanhoe Line.

In August 2016, a road bridge by the station partially collapsed during maintenance work, severely disrupting train services.

== Facilities ==
The station is unstaffed and facilities are limited although there is a self-service ticket machine for ticket purchases as well as shelters and modern help points on both platforms. Bicycle storage is also available at the station.

Step-free access is not available to either of the platforms at the station.

== Services ==
All services at Barrow-upon-Soar are operated by East Midlands Railway using class 158 and class 170 DMUs.

The typical off-peak service in trains per hour is:

- 1 tph to Leicester
- 1 tph to Nottingham

Fast trains on the Midland Main Line pass by the station but do not stop.

The station is closed on Sundays.

Preceding station	National Rail	Following station
Sileby	East Midlands Railway Ivanhoe Line; Monday-Saturday only	Loughborough
