= Rothley railway station =

Heritage station on the Great Central railway

Rothley
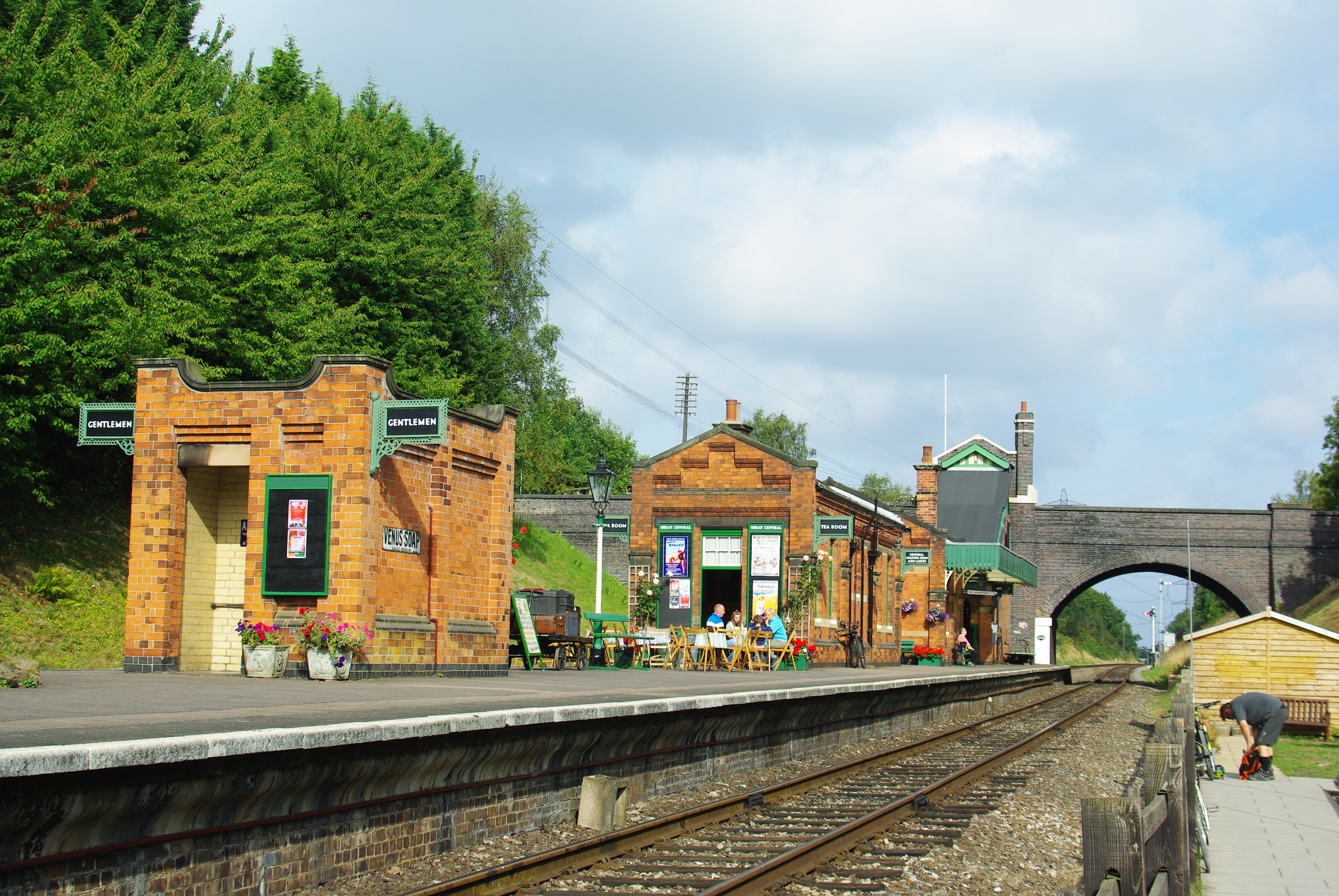

General information
- Location: Rothley, Leicestershire; England
- Coordinates: 52.7048°N 1.1600°W
- Grid reference: SK568122
- System: Station on heritage railway
- Operator: Great Central Railway (preserved)
- Platforms: 2

History
- Opened: 15 March 1899
- Closed: 4 March 1963
- Original company: Great Central Railway
- Post-grouping: London and North Eastern Railway
Location

Rothley railway station is a heritage railway station on the preserved section of the Great Central Railway's London Extension. Built to the standard island platform pattern of country stations on the line, it originally opened on 15 March 1899 and has been restored to late Edwardian era condition, circa 1910. The station is grade II listed.

== History ==
=== Proposed Swithland station ===
Rothley station did not feature in the original plans for the Great Central Main Line; a station was to be constructed at nearby Swithland instead. However due to pressure from the residents of Rothley, a station was opened at Rothley instead.

Construction was started on the station at Swithland before the plans were halted: the staircase which would have taken passengers from road level to the platforms was built but later sealed off. The location of the planned Swithland station can also still be seen as the track widens as it passes over The Ridings.

=== Construction and Opening ===
Rothley station was built between 1897 and 1899, opening to passengers on 15 March 1899. It was built party in a cutting at the north end and on an embankment at the south end. Platform access is via a set of stairs from the overbridge across the north end of the station. The platform measures 441 feet (134 m) long and 33 feet (10 m) wide at its widest point. A modest goods yard with a goods shed, weighbridge and coal store were provided on the east side of the station, with train and shunting movements controlled from a signal box a little to the south of station on the west side of the main running lines. A stationmaster's house at the north eastern corner of the site watches over the station from on top of the banks.

=== Closure ===
The station closed on 4 March 1963 although trains continued to pass through until the line closed in 1969.

=== Preservation ===
The station was reopened on 23 March 1974 as part of the preserved Great Central Railway. The platform features a booking office, waiting room, tea room and toilet facilities. In the former goods yard is an old coal and corn store which, from 2008 until 2026 was used as a tearoom. The railway's carriage and wagon repair facility is located at the south end of the station. The station is presented in the Edwardian era when it was operated by the Great Central Railway company. The two platforms at the station are not numbered, and referred to as the 'Up' and 'Down' platforms, as was the practice at the time. The station is entirely lit with gas lamps, as it never had mains electricity before closure by British Rail.

Overseeing railway traffic movements in the area is Rothley Cabin, a signal box recovered from Blind Lane Junction in Wembley and erected facing the station on the west side of the line. This signal box controls entry and exit to the southern end of the Great Central Railway's unique double track. In 2009 it was joined by an ex-GCR lamp hut taken from Whetstone railway station.

Preceding station	Heritage railways	Following station
Quorn and Woodhouse towards Loughborough Central	Great Central Railway Leicestershire section	Leicester North Terminus
Historical railways
Quorn and Woodhouse; Line and station open	Great Central Railway; Great Central Main Line	Belgrave and Birstall; Line open, station closed
Aborted plans
Swithland; Line Open and station Never Opened	Great Central Railway; Great Central Main Line	Belgrave and Birstall; Line open, station closed
