= Belgrave and Birstall railway station =

Former railway station in Leicestershire, England

Coordinates: 52°40′7.24″N 1°7′58.72″W

Belgrave and Birstall
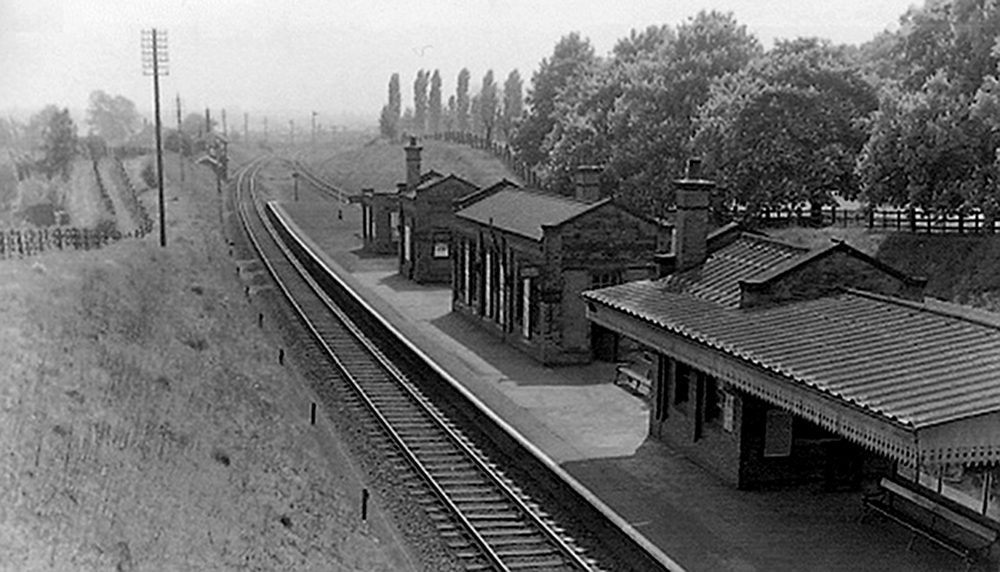
- Belgrave and Birstall station in 1962

General information
- Location: Birstall, Charnwood; England
- Grid reference: SK587082
- Platforms: 2

Other information
- Status: Disused (as Belgrave and Birstall); Active (as Leicester North)

History
- Pre-grouping: Great Central Railway
- Post-grouping: London and North Eastern Railway; London Midland Region of British Railways

Key dates
- 15 March 1899: Opened
- 4 March 1963: Closed
Location

Belgrave and Birstall railway station was a railway station opened by the Great Central Railway in 1899. It served the villages of Belgrave and Birstall in Leicestershire until its closure in 1963. In 1991, Leicester North railway station was opened immediately to the south of Belgrave and Birstall railway station by the preserved Great Central heritage railway.

== History ==
Belgrave and Birstall station was built as a part of the Great Central Railway's London Extension and opened to passengers on 15 March 1899. The station was built to the standard London Extension country station pattern of a single large 'island' platform between the two running lines, on which stood the station buildings, including ticket office and waiting rooms. Access was made by descending a flight of stairs from a road bridge (structure number 363) that crossed the line.

A signal box and a lamp hut were provided to the south east of the station and further afield a station master's house was constructed. Built within the tight constraints of a cutting, Belgrave and Birstall was the only rural station on the London Extension to have no goods facilities.

=== After closure ===
Belgrave and Birstall station closed on 1 March 1963 along with most other local stations on the London Extension. A group of local enthusiasts formed the Belgrave and Birstall Action Group (B-BAG) in the late 1960s with the aim of restoring the station. When the Main Line Preservation Group (MLPG) formed in 1968 with the aim of preserving a section of the London Extension for the use of steam trains, the B-BAG effectively merged to become a small sub-group of the MLPG.

Vandalism was an ever-present problem for the B-BAG. By summer 1971 police had been summoned on a number of occasions to the station, which was reported to be in a "very sad state". As late as spring 1972 the action group was not yet allowed access to the site to repair vandalism, and buildings were in a dangerous condition which would require "substantial rebuilding".

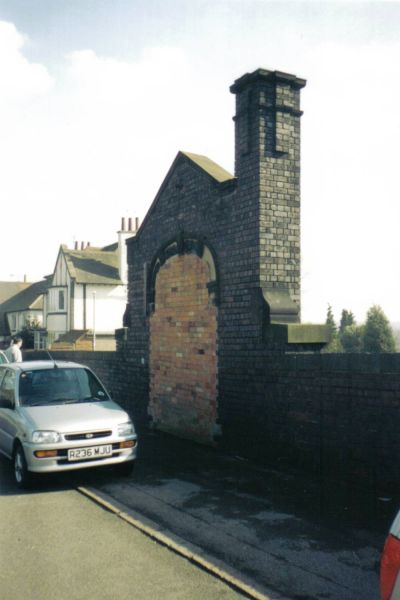
The bricked-up road-level entrance to Belgrave and Birstall station as seen in 2003

Restoration work at the station began in June 1972, and considerable efforts were made in making some of the buildings safe. Other buildings required more substantive work.

Due to increasing financial pressures placed upon the Main Line Steam Trust (as the MLPG had become) by British Rail, in 1973, one of the two tracks between Belgrave and Birstall and Rothley was lifted, leaving only a single track in place. In 1976 the remaining track was lifted, leaving no rail access to Belgrave and Birstall station.

Ever present vandalism continued to leave the station buildings in a dangerous state, and the B-BAG reluctantly decided to demolish three of the station buildings – the Gentleman's toilets; Station Master's Office; and Ladies' Room and General Waiting Room buildings were removed on 18 and 19 June 1977. The Booking Office; Stairs; and "tunnel rooms" were bricked up for later use. The remaining structures were removed in 1985, leaving only the platform and bricked up road-level entrance. The entrance archway remains to this day, though bricked up, as can be seen on recent photographs.

Preceding station	Heritage railways	Following station
Rothley towards Loughborough Central	Great Central Railway Leicestershire section	Terminus
Disused railways
Rothley; Line and station open	Great Central Railway; London Extension	Leicester Central; Line and station closed
