= Loughborough Gap =

Railway line in the United Kingdom

Coordinates: 52.77844°N 1.19349°W

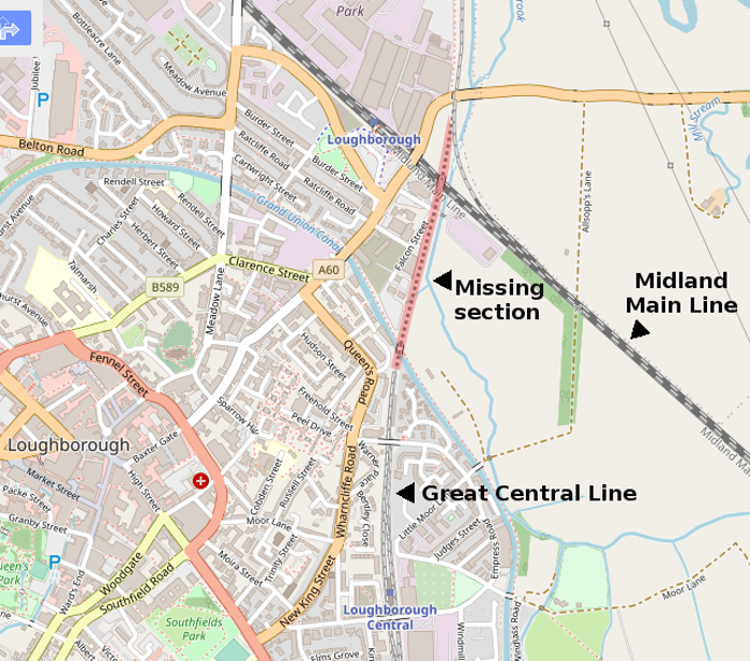
Map of the gap (in red)

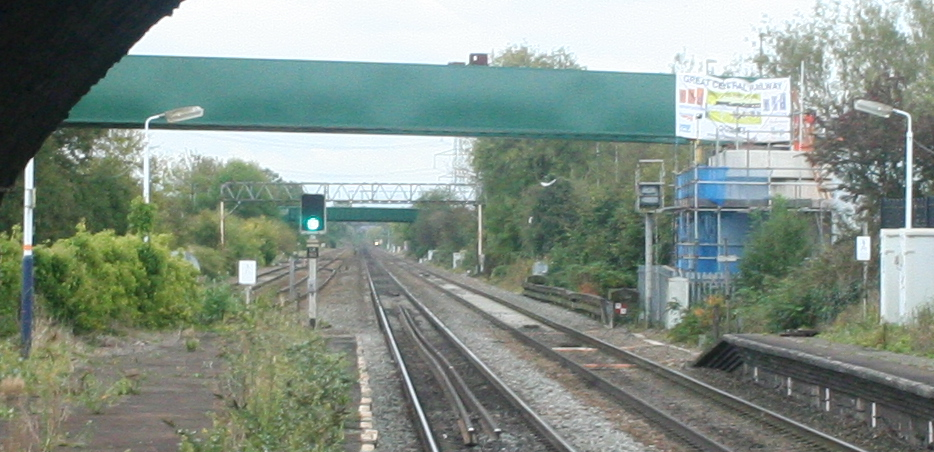
New 2017 Great Central Railway bridge over the Midland Main Line, viewed looking southwards from Loughborough railway station

The Loughborough Gap is a 500-metre-long (0.3-mile) missing section of the Great Central Main Line to the north-east of Loughborough, England. The gap was created by the removal of embankments and bridges during the 1980s and the restoration project has been branded Bridge to the Future and Bridging the Gap. From south-to-north the route crosses the Grand Union Canal, Railway Terrace road, a Factory car park, four-track Midland Main Line at Loughborough railway station and the A60 road. The Hermitage Brook watercourse runs parallel.

During the 2010s work began to restore the link in order to join the northern and southern sections of two heritage railways back together giving a total Great Central Railway (heritage railway) line length of 18 miles (29 km). As of 2016, planning permission was granted for the first major component: a replacement 30-metre (33 yd) single-span bridge over the Midland Main Line. An additional station called Loughborough High Level will be built to connect with Loughborough (Midland) station on the Midland Main Line. As of May 2016, the bridge was intended to be owned by Charnwood Borough Council and then leased back to the Great Central Railway for one hundred years in exchange for maintenance costs. Work commenced in April 2017, with the main bridge beams being installed in September of that year. The bridge is expected to be completed in 2019.

The replacement bridge was completed ahead of schedule in August 2018. However due to slight encroachment on the original trackbed, the bridge is slightly askew from the original alignment. Refurbishment has also been conducted on the canal bridge just beyond the existing train shed. Future work will see the embankment reinstated and the current train shed demolished and replaced by one close by as the shed occupies the main line alignment. In addition signalling will need be connected and updated to match the other preserved line.

== History ==
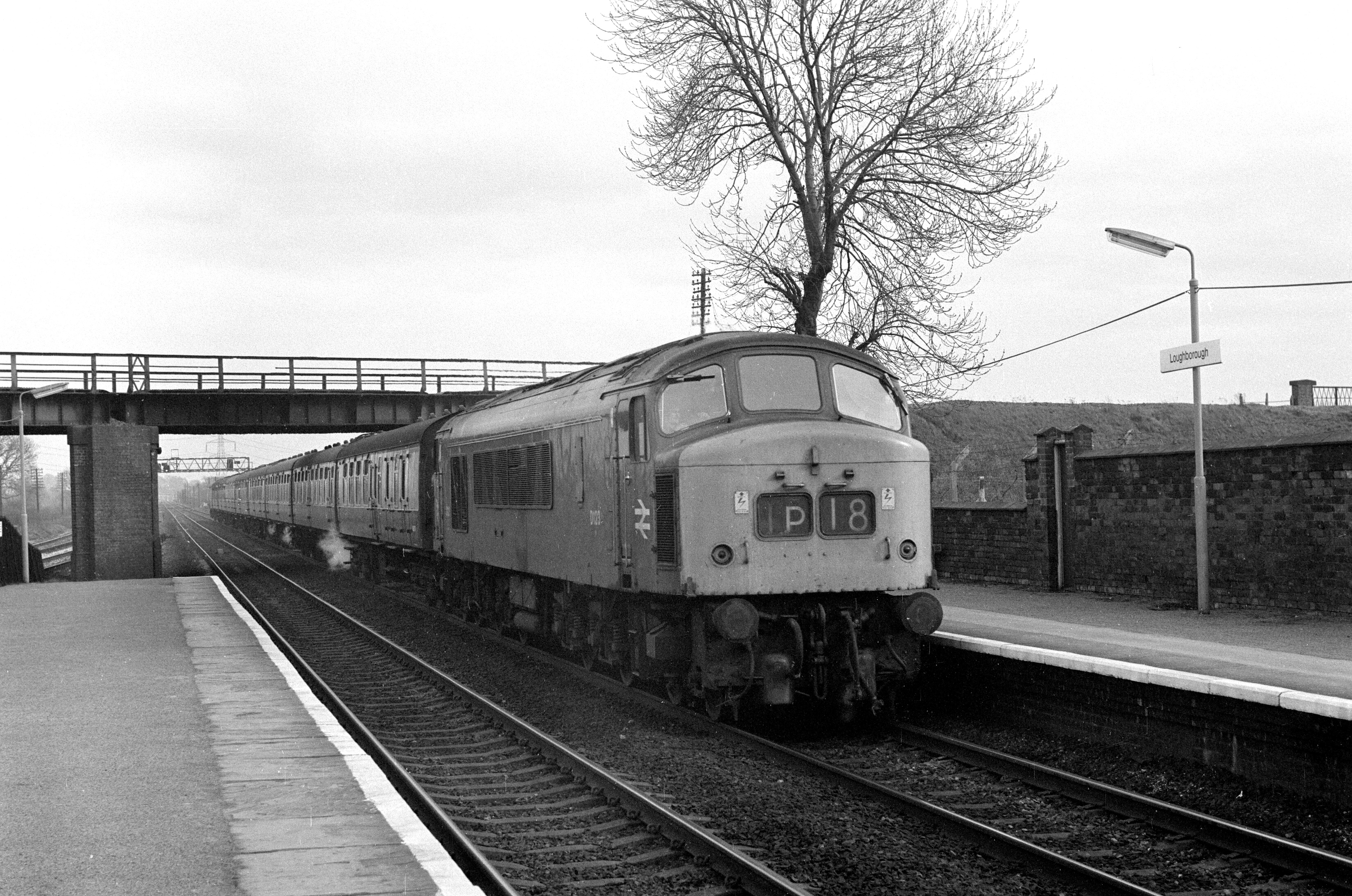
A train on the Midland Main Line passing under the former GCR bridge in 1973.

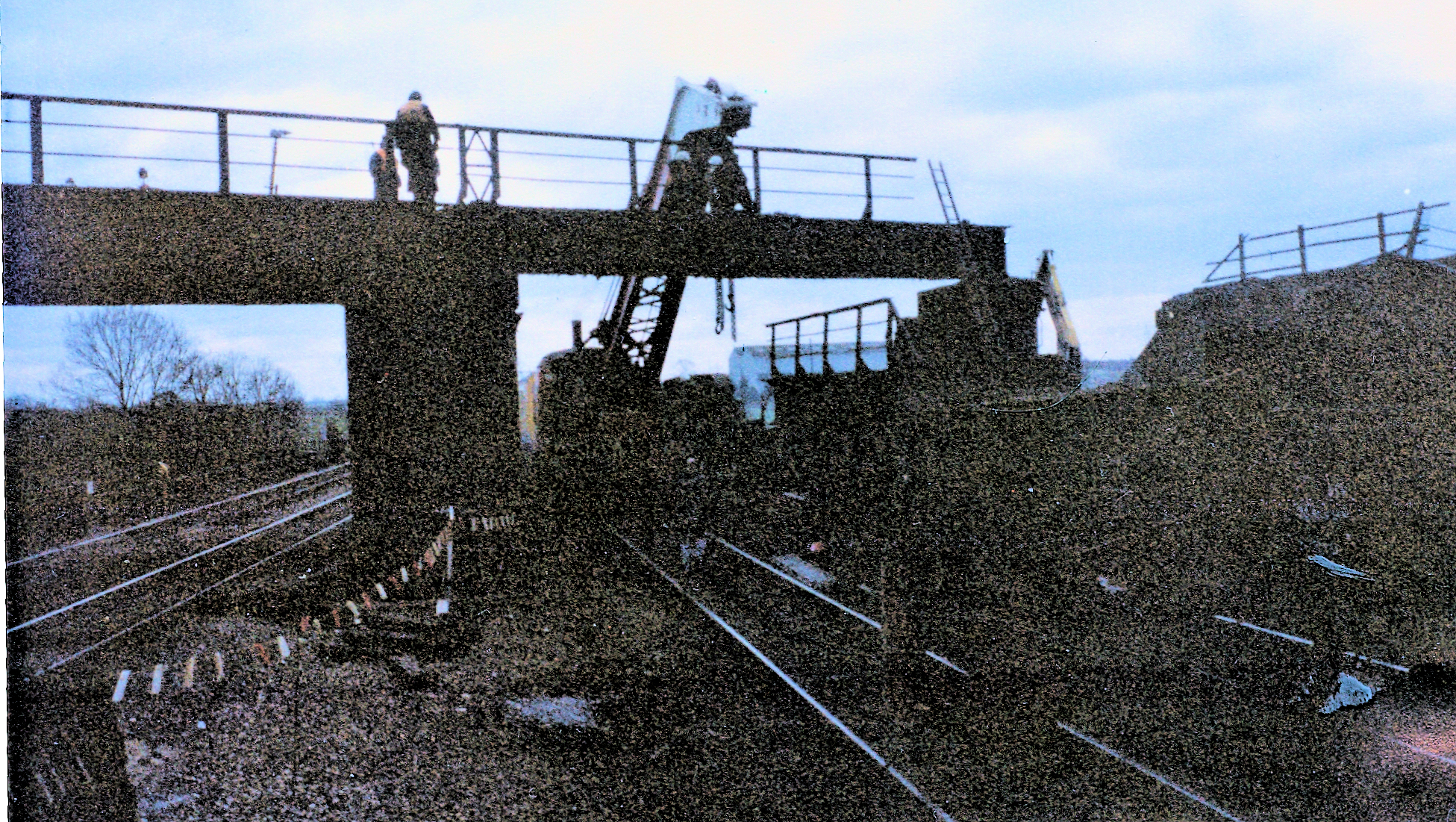
The original bridge being demolished in 1980.

As a relatively late-developed railway in the United Kingdom, the GCR was forced to make some expensive civil engineering choices in order to complete their route. Just north of Loughborough Central, the railway had to cross the existing Leicester section of the Grand Union Canal, before then crossing the existing Midland Main Line formation as well as avoiding the Hermitage Brook, before moving northwards to Nottingham.

Choosing to approach the location on a raised embankment, the railway engineers used a steel-decked span bridge to cross the canal and a double-deck, double-width steel-decked span bridge to cross the Midland Railway.

After the decision was made to close the GCR as part of the Beeching Axe, in the late 1960s contractors were appointed to remove the railway tracks and major parts of the civil engineering infrastructure. This included the section north of Loughborough Central to north of the Midland Main Line. Contractors initially removed the railway tracks, before also removing the bridges and supporting buttresses over the Midland Main Line, and then the embankment to its south. Unfortunately, the following year the Hermitage Brook flooded, resulting in additional contractors being engaged to reimplement part of the railway's former embankment.

After the formation of the Great Central as a heritage railway, bridging the resultant "gap" always became a significant challenge to realise the full operational vision. Since the closure of the line, Morley Street industrial estate had been developed on part of the site formerly occupied by the embankment, whilst Charnwood Borough Council had developed, filled with household waste and then covered a landfill to the south. The GCR itself, having started re-instatement of the GCR line from Loughborough Central to the south, had developed its locomotive shed on the old alignment to the north of the station.

== Current features ==
The Gap is 500 metres (550 yd) long, and approximately 30 metres (33 yd) wide for most of its length, running due north–south approximately 1 kilometre (0.6 mi) north from Loughborough Central. It is bounded: to the west by the northeasternmost part of Loughborough, including the Loughborough Midland station and Morley Street industrial estate; to the east by the covered former household refuse site; and to the north and south by GCR's northern and southern sections respectively.

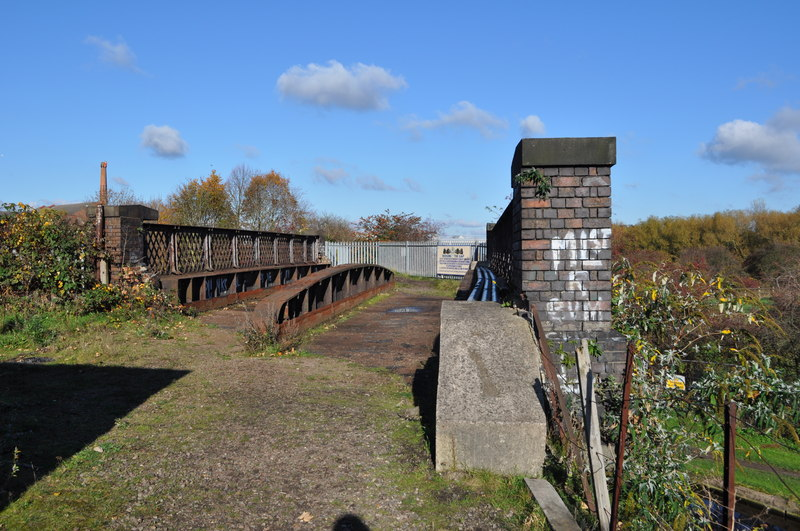
The Gap from the canal bridge, November 2010

Current plans for bridging the gap, using a single-track line, include:

- Removing the Loughborough north shed. This will be a long-term project, as the approach from the canal bridge to Loughborough North signal box will initially be a single track running alongside the existing shed. This has been 3D modelled to prove feasibility.
- Using two donated 17 m (19 yd) spans from the former Great Western Main Line to the west of Reading, which were removed in April 2011 by Network Rail when revamping the station as part of an £825 million project. These were originally planned to bridge the gap over the Midland Main Line, but are now planned to be deployed elsewhere in the project. This part is called the "Factory Flyover".
- Add a 300 metre embankment between the canal bridge and the factory flyover.
- Fix the embankment between the A60 bridge and the midland main line bridge.

Once complete, the project will create a combined 18-mile-long (29 km) heritage railway.

== Implementation ==
After the UK Government's announcement in 2012 that the Midland Main Line would be electrified by 2018, the project timescales to be completed or not were implemented. In 2013, the GCR engaged Network Rail to act as project engineers, project manager and main contractor to complete the project. In June 2013, the GCR and Network Rail signed an agreement to allow bridging of the Midland Main Line, including the underlying operations, maintenance and legal liability agreements for such.

Preliminary works began January 2014 with boreholes being drilled in preparation for the bridge over the Midland Main Line at Loughborough.

In July 2014, the GCR received a one million pound grant from the UK Government's "Local Growth Deal", via an allocation to the Leicester and Leicestershire Local Enterprise Partnership; the grant will support the GCR's "Bridging the Gap" project.

=== Planning application ===
On 15 April 2014 a planning application was submitted by Great Central Railway PLC with Network Rail acting as agents for "Installation of rail bridge over midland mainline"; which was granted on 27 June 2014. The bridge was envisioned as being single-track and made of two spans and a central supporting pillar in the middle. On 10 February 2015 a non-material minor amendment was applied for in order to allow construction using a single-span bridge design "to remove [the] central pillar"; which was granted by Charnwood Borough Council on 26 March 2015. A two-span design had originally been proposed in order to enable reuse of bridge components removed during the rebuilding of Reading station.

=== Contracts and legals ===
Although the GCR owns the track from Loughborough to Leicester North, the underlying land is owned by Charnwood Borough Council, on a 99-year lease signed in 1976. Bridges over or under Network Rail infrastructure must be owned by organisations which can provide suitable legal liability to any incidents which may occur as a result of operations, which means to meet this requirement the owning organisation needs to have a minimum net present value of over £250M. As the GCR can not clearly meet this criterion, after contract negotiations, it was agreed that Charnwood Borough Council will retain ownership of the land up to the southern abutment of the new bridge, whilst Network Rail will become the owner of the new bridge. The GCR will resultantly negotiate an operational lease agreement with Network Rail, which will define operational requirements which the GCR must comply with over the bridge.

==== Midland Main Line bridge ====
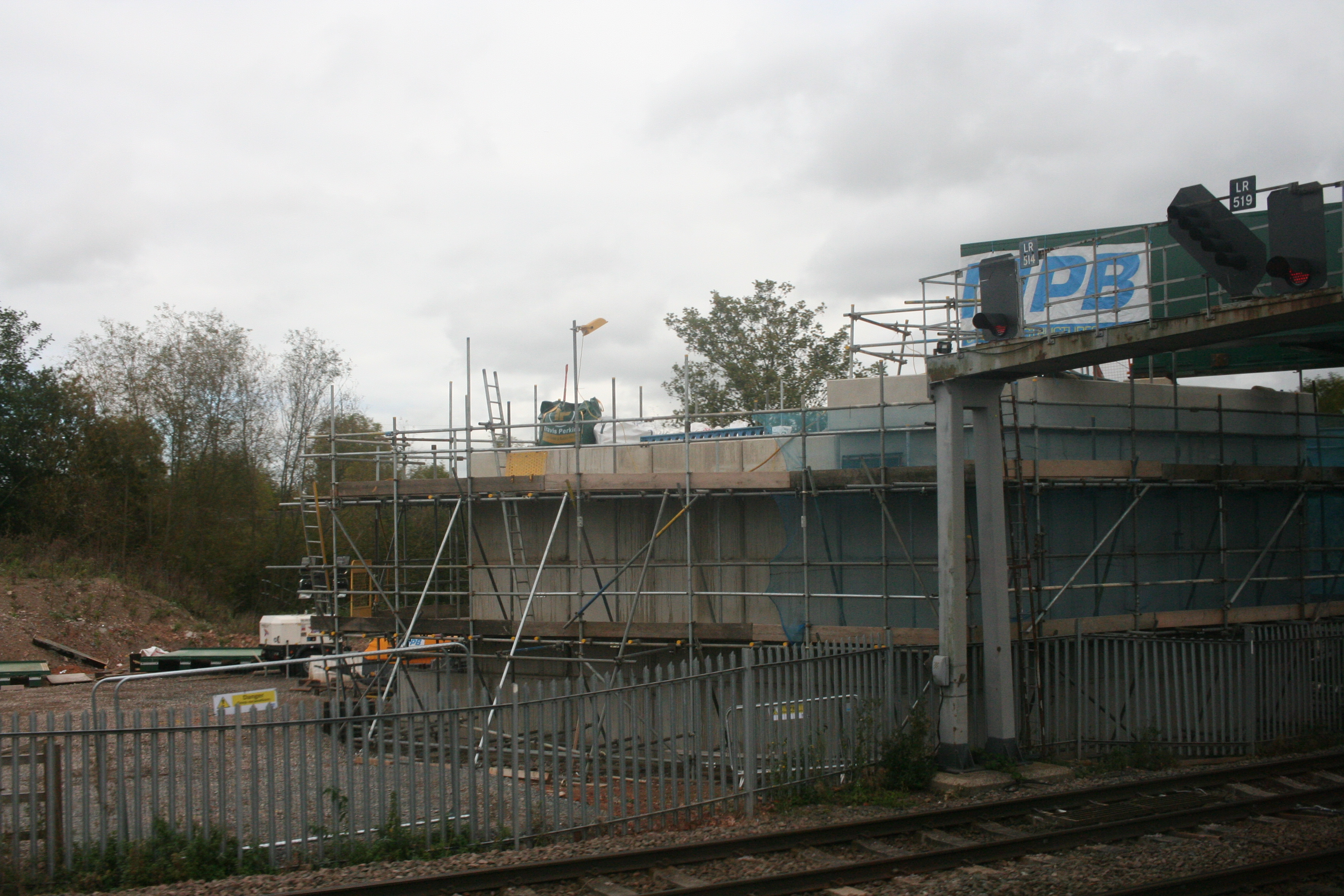
Foundations at the east end of the new Great Central Railway over the Midland Main Line bridge.

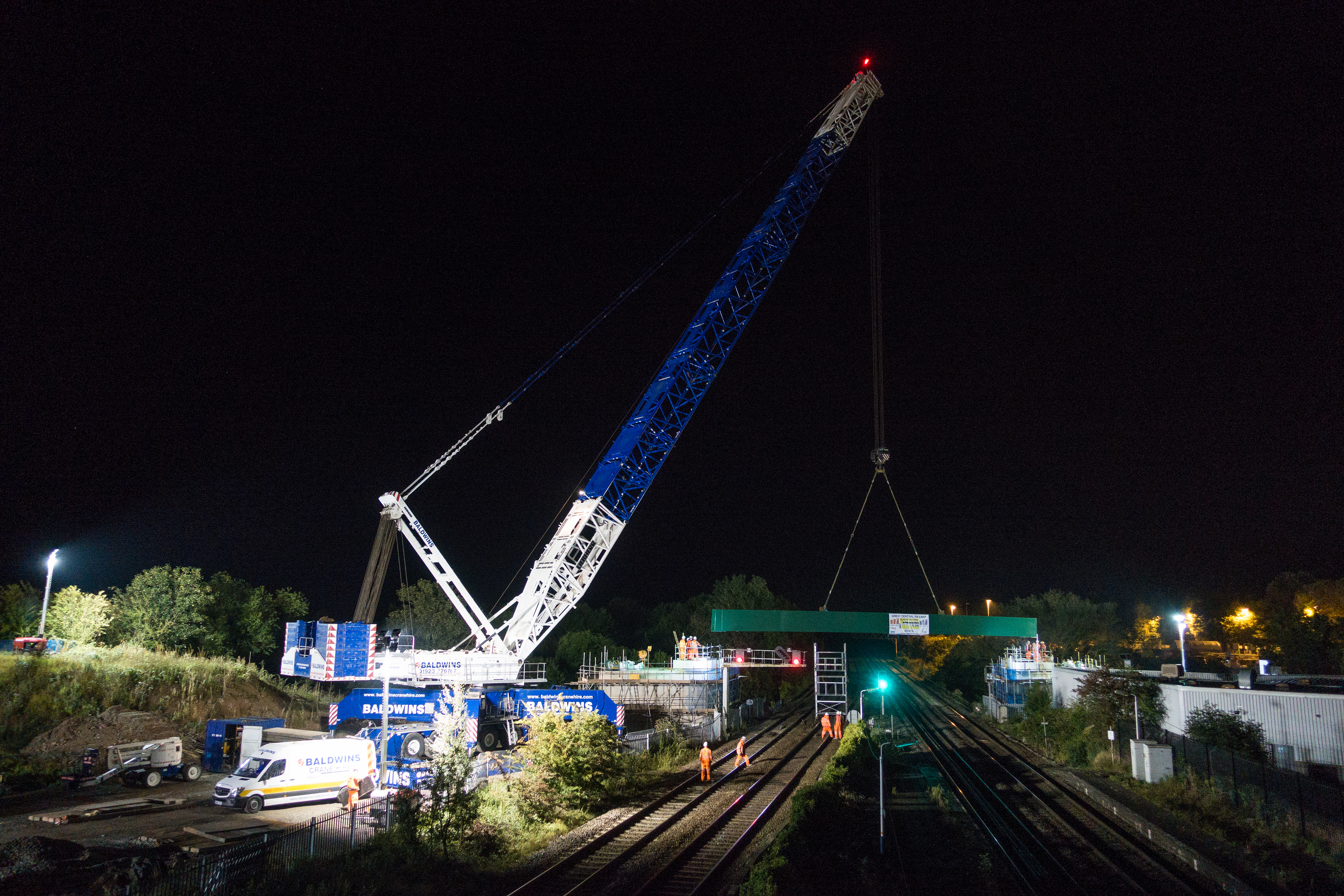
Section of the new bridge to carry the Great Central Railway over Midland Main Line being installed in the early morning of 3 September 2017

Preparatory work on the bridge over the Midland Main Line began on 12 February 2016 while the main construction work commenced in April 2017, with the main bridge beams being installed in September 2017. In the early hours of 3 September 2017 a 1000-tonne crane was used to lift the two steel beams forming the basis of the bridge into place.

The bridge was expected to be completed in 2019. As of late 2017, £2.5m had been spent installing the bridge over the Midland Main Line.

==== Canal bridge ====
In 2014 a detailed assessment of work on the double track bridge over the Grand Union canal had been undertaken. The bridge had last carried trains in 1969. As of October 2017 three separate quotes for renovating the bridge had been obtained, refurbishment is expected to cost about £400,000. Bridge refurbishment completed July 2020.

==== A60 bridge ====
In 2022, the A60 bridge was completely refurbished to allow trains on the GCR north to run again.
