= Loughborough railway station =

Railway station in Leicestershire, England

Coordinates: 52°46′44.67″N 1°11′45.77″W

Loughborough
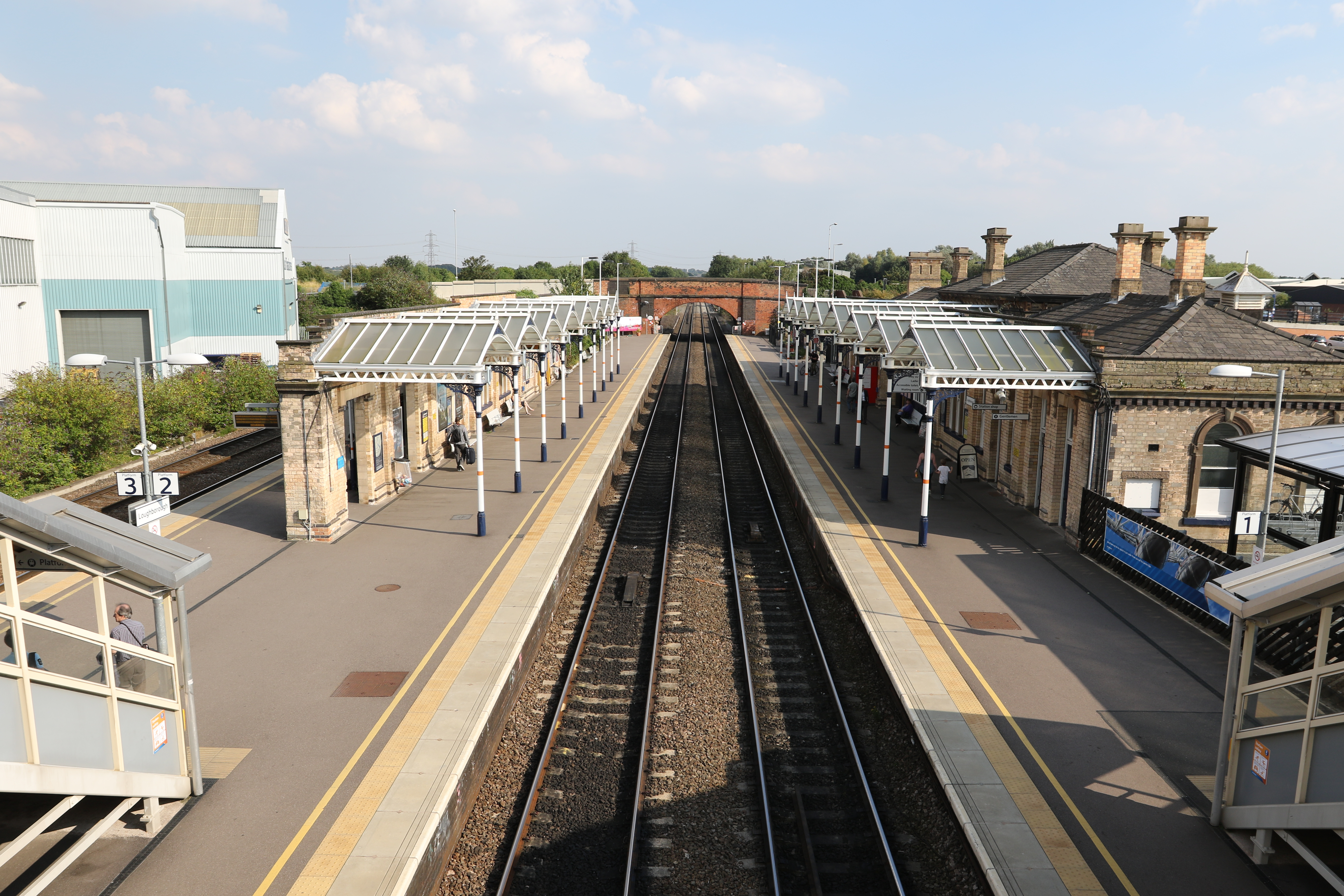

General information
- Location: Loughborough, Borough of Charnwood, England
- Grid reference: SK543204
- Managed by: East Midlands Railway
- Platforms: 3
- Tracks: 4

Other information
- Station code: LBO
- Classification: DfT category C1

History
- Opened: 1872

Passengers
- 2020/21: ▼0.299 million
- Interchange: ▼10,719
- 2021/22: ▲0.963 million
- Interchange: ▲34,530
- 2022/23: ▲1.227 million
- Interchange: ▼13,513
- 2023/24: ▲1.287 million
- Interchange: ▼12,882
- 2024/25: ▲1.422 million
- Interchange: ▲13,159

Listed Building – Grade II
- Feature: Loughborough railway station
- Designated: 5 May 1981
- Reference no.: 1320325
Location
Notes
- Passenger statistics from the Office of Rail and Road

Loughborough is a Grade II listed railway station that serves the town of Loughborough, in Leicestershire, England. It is a stop on the Midland Main Line and is located 111 miles (179 km) north of London St Pancras. The station is sited to the north-east of the town centre.

== History ==
The original station was opened in 1840 by the Midland Counties Railway, which was shortly to join the North Midland Railway and the Birmingham and Derby Junction Railway to form the Midland Railway; it was sited a little further south than the current station.

The present station was built in 1872. The ironwork was constructed by Mr Richards and the stone portion by Mr Cox, both of Leicester. The track was quadrupled and has retained much of its characteristically Midland Railway architecture, other than its canopies having been cut back. The station is grade II listed.

It became known as Loughborough Midland when the town had three stations; the other two were:

- Loughborough Derby Road opened in 1883 on the Charnwood Forest Railway and was owned by London and North Western Railway from 1923. It was closed to passengers in 1931.
- Loughborough Central on the Great Central Railway; it is now used by the heritage railway bearing the same name.

== Facilities ==
The station is staffed and has a side platform layout. A third shorter platform was created on the down slow line for the commencement of Ivanhoe Line passenger services in 1993.

In 2000, passenger information systems were updated and now use dot matrix display screens. In 2006, automatic ticket gates were installed on all approaches to the station in order to cut down on fare evasion; these were complemented with ticket vending machines and additional FastTicket machines. The manual Tannoy system was replaced by an automated voice on 13 July 2011.

Other facilities include bicycle racks, chargeable car parking, a shop and snack bar, public telephones and toilets.

=== Refurbishment ===
Up until 2012, access to all but platform 1 was awkward for many passengers. The station had a footbridge and a barrow crossing to access platforms 2 and 3. In addition, since the early 1990s, the usable length of the two main platforms was four coaches due to the A60 road bridge.

Loughborough Eastern Gateway, a locally-led project, proved to be the catalyst after many years of proposals to improve the station. The scheme got underway in March 2010.

A £7 million package of improvements was started at the station in June 2010. Platforms were extended to accommodate the longest trains which serve the station, lifts were provided to access all platforms, and refurbishment of the existing ticket office, waiting rooms and glass platform canopies.

The extended platforms 1 and 2 are capable of handling ten-car trains; the extended platform 3 can handle up to seven-car trains. The new facilities were opened in good time for the 2012 British and Japanese Olympic squads basing themselves in the town.

== Services ==
East Midlands Railway operates all services that stop at Loughborough. The typical off-peak service pattern is as follows:

Platform 1:

- Hourly service to Sheffield, via Derby and Chesterfield
- Hourly service to Nottingham, via Beeston.

Platform 2:

- Hourly fast service to London St Pancras, via Leicester
- Hourly semi-fast service to London St Pancras, via Leicester, Market Harborough and Kettering.

Platform 3:

- Hourly local service to Nottingham (Stopper)
- Hourly local service to Leicester, via Syston.

Preceding station	National Rail	Following station
Leicester	East Midlands Railway Midland Main Line	East Midlands Parkway
Barrow-upon-Soar	East Midlands Railway Ivanhoe Line	East Midlands Parkway
Melton Mowbray	East Midlands Railway Nottingham–Norwich Limited service	East Midlands Parkway
Historical railways
Hathern; Line open, station closed	Midland Railway; Midland Main Line	Barrow-upon-Soar; Line and station open
Preceding station	Heritage railways	Following station
Proposed extension
East Leake towards Ruddington Fields	Great Central Railway	Loughborough Central towards Leicester North

== Onward connections ==
The following bus routes serve the station or nearby:

- Kinchbus's Sprint service to Loughborough University, via the town centre
- Nottingham City Transport's route 1 to Nottingham, via Clifton and East Leake
- Kinchbus's service 9 to Nottingham, via the A60 and Bunny
- Centrebus's service 8 to Melton Mowbray and Grantham
- Centrebus's service 27 to Sileby and Thurmaston.
