= Swithland Sidings =

Railway sidings

Coordinates: 52°42′48.00″N 01°10′00.00″W

Swithland railway station

General information
- Location: England
- Platforms: 2

Other information
- Status: Disused

History
- Original company: Great Central Railway

Key dates
- 1899: Planned Opening, Never Opened
- 1964: sidings closed
- 1969: Line Closed
- 1990: Line Reopened
Location

Swithland Sidings is a set of railway sidings on the preserved Great Central Railway, situated just south of Swithland Reservoir and Swithland Viaduct which crosses it. It is the site of the proposed Swithland railway station, which was never completed.

== History of the site ==
The original plans for the Great Central Main Line had a station situated at Swithland rather than Rothley, although Rothley was the much larger village of the two. The station would have consisted of an island platform of the standard design that became typical of the line, here the less common "embankment" type reached from a road that passed beneath the line, similar to East Leake station.

Local pressure forced a change in the plans and the proposed site changed to Rothley; however, this did not mean that Swithland station was abandoned. The railway company intended to turn the area into a tourist spot and the construction of Swithland station was commenced anyway. The staircase which would have taken passengers from road level to the platforms was built but later sealed off when construction was abandoned. It is not known whether the platform or any other part of the proposed station was built.

These later plans never came to fruition, and Rothley station - less than a mile to the south - was deemed adequate to serve the area.

Sidings and a signal box were however sited here to serve the Mountsorrel Railway, a mineral branch leading to granite quarries in the village of Mountsorrel about two miles to the north east. In 1955 Swithland Sidings featured four sidings, a reception line, up and down loops and a horse dock. The last recorded train to run along the branch line was in 1953 and the track was lifted in the 1960s.

The line was closed by British Rail in 1969. Following its closure, the sidings were ripped up, leaving only one track in place.

== Preservation ==
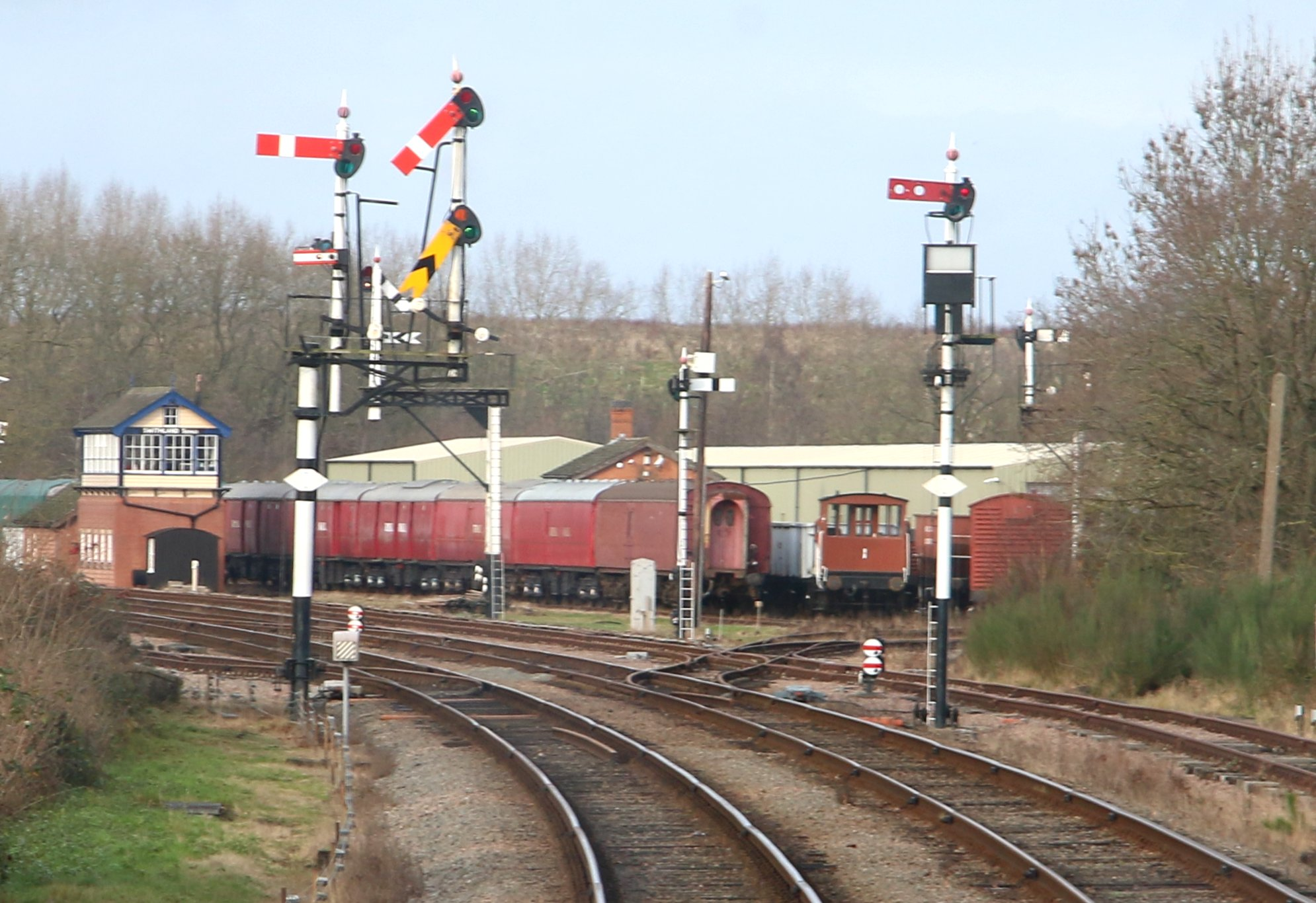
The signal box, carriage shed and signals at Swithland sidings

In 1990 double track was re-laid through the site.

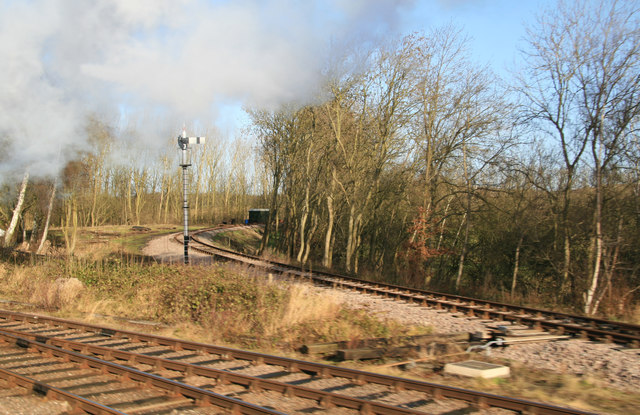
The branch line to Mountsorrel

In 2010, volunteers from the Great Central Railway and Mountsorrel Railway Project began re-laying the track along the branch line to Mountsorrel Quarry. The first passenger train ran up to Nunckley Hill on 23 November 2013 and by March 2015 the platform at Mountsorrel was completed.

In the summer of 2012, the former Aylesbury South signal box (from Aylesbury railway station) was commissioned at the site for controlling train movements. Great Western Railway signals are used on this section of the line to represent the joint line of the Great Western and Great Central.

Swithland sidings now comprises the two main lines with loops on each side, a complex of sidings for storing rail vehicles and the Mountsorrel branch. Railway Vehicle Preservations Limited has a four-road carriage shed on the site for the dry storage of rail vehicles.
