= Leicester North railway station =

Heritage railway station in Leicester, England

Leicester North
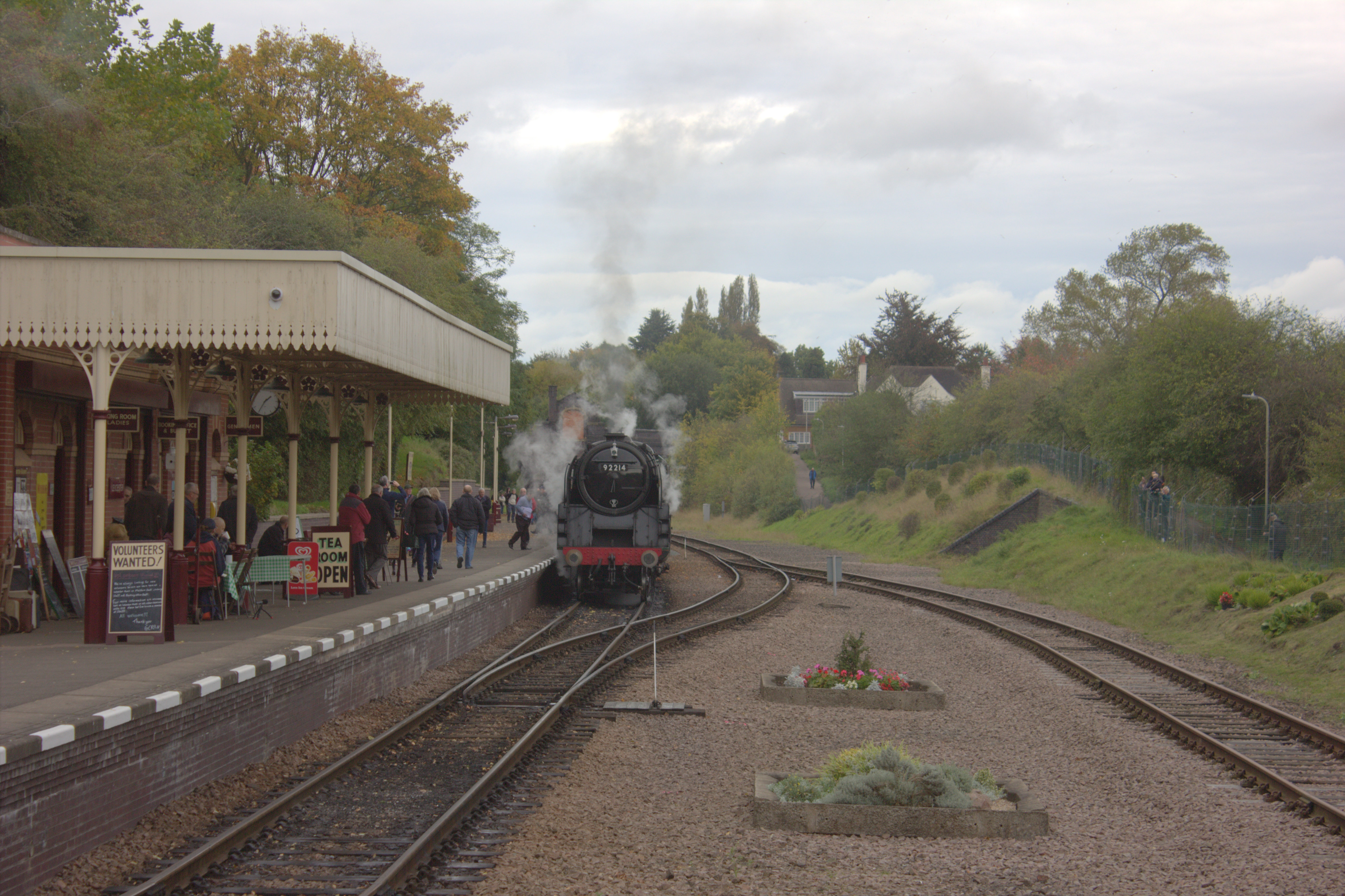
- Leicester North in 2017

General information
- Location: Leicester; England
- Platforms: 1

History
- Opened: 5 July 1991

Leicester North railway station is a railway station at the southern terminus of the preserved Great Central Railway. It is located immediately south of the site of the old Belgrave and Birstall station which was demolished between 1977 and 1985. The current station was built in 1991.

== History ==
The site of what is now known as Leicester North station was originally a relatively unremarkable part of the Great Central Railway's Main Line between Leicester and Loughborough. The double-track mainline passed through where the buffer stops are now and continued towards Leicester Central. The north end of the site was the location Belgrave and Birstall Station. The present-day buffer stops are located at the site of what used to be the trailing crossover to the south of Belgrave and Birstall.

Belgrave and Birstall station closed on 1 March 1963, followed by the complete closure of the Great Central Main Line in 1969. Following the closure of the line, the Main Line Preservation Group began running train services between Loughborough Central and Rothley.

In Autumn 1984 it was announced that the preserved Great Central Railway would be extended from its then-terminus at Rothley to Belgrave and Birstall.

Work on the extension had started to clear vegetation that had grown on the track bed. More serious problems to be handled were the encroachment of road improvements. To the immediate south of the station, a new road from Mowmacre Hill to Redhill roundabout would cut through the railway's embankment. Leicester City Council agreed to build an access road (eventually named The Sidings) to the railway from this new road, later to be known as the Leicester Western Distributor road. A mile to the north of the station, the new Leicester by-pass was planned to be built crossing the line. This effectively set a deadline of 1986 to build the first mile of track, since the new bridge was to add greatly to the cost of the by-pass. It was suggested to the railway that if there was no railway line to cross by 1986, it would be cheaper to have the light railway order (LRO) to Birstall rescinded on the grounds that the company had no plans to go there.

By Spring 1985, discussion on the design of the new station to replace Belgrave and Birstall had begun. The appeal to fund the Birstall Extension was officially launched on 8 June 1985 by H.R.H. The Duke of Gloucester, who inserted a ceremonial chromium-plated bolt into the trackwork at Rothley. With Manpower Services Commission assisted work continuing on the extension, design ideas for the new station at Birstall all incorporated the original platform and bridge as part of the scheme, although schemes where the platform would be extended to the north of the road bridge were formally scrapped. By late 1987, however, it seemed that through co-funding via Leicester City, who planned to build a museum 'Industrial village' adjacent to the site, a wholly new station to the south of Belgrave and Birstall would be built, requiring the removal of the existing platform.

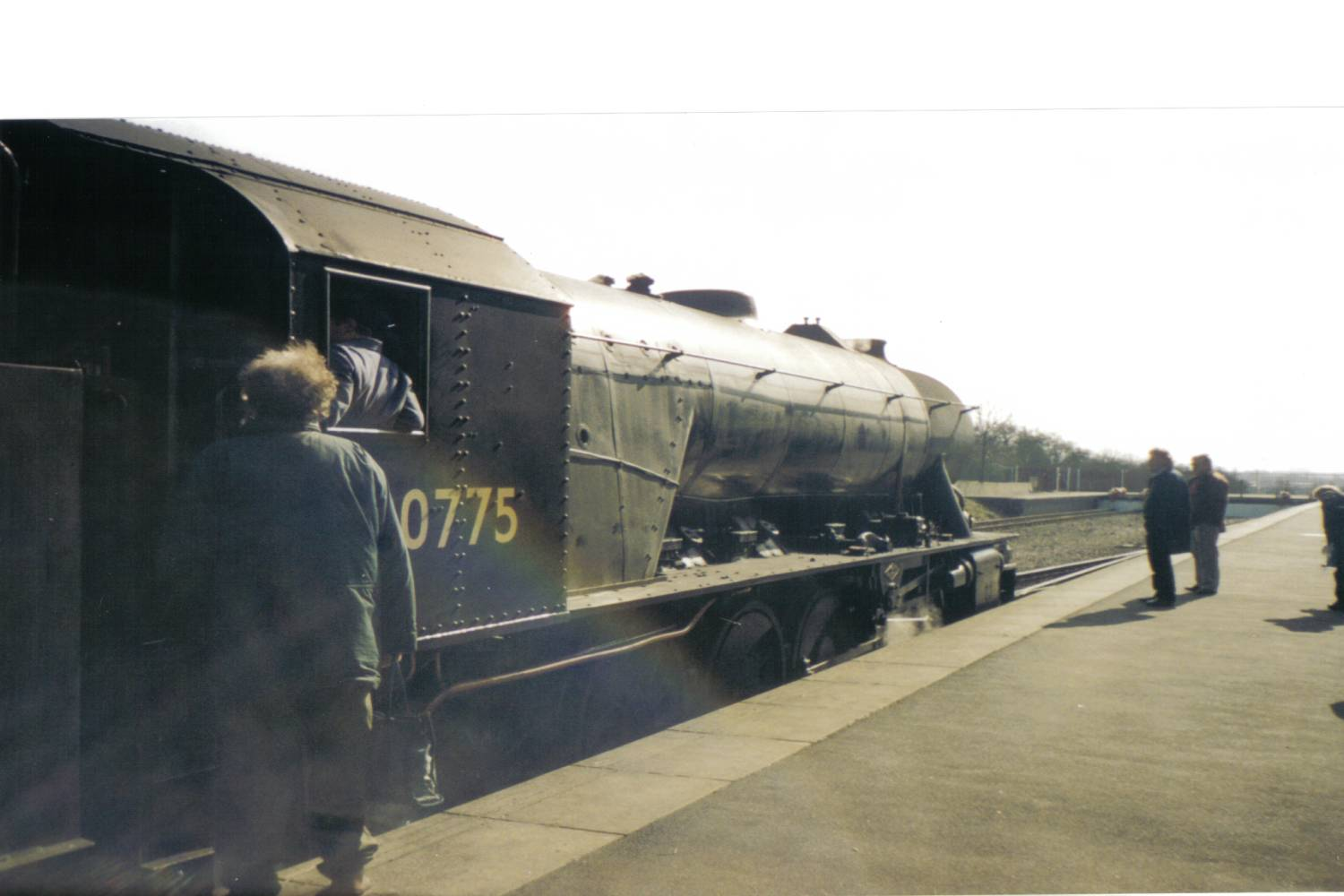
Austerity 2-10-0 No.90775 rests after arriving at Leicester North

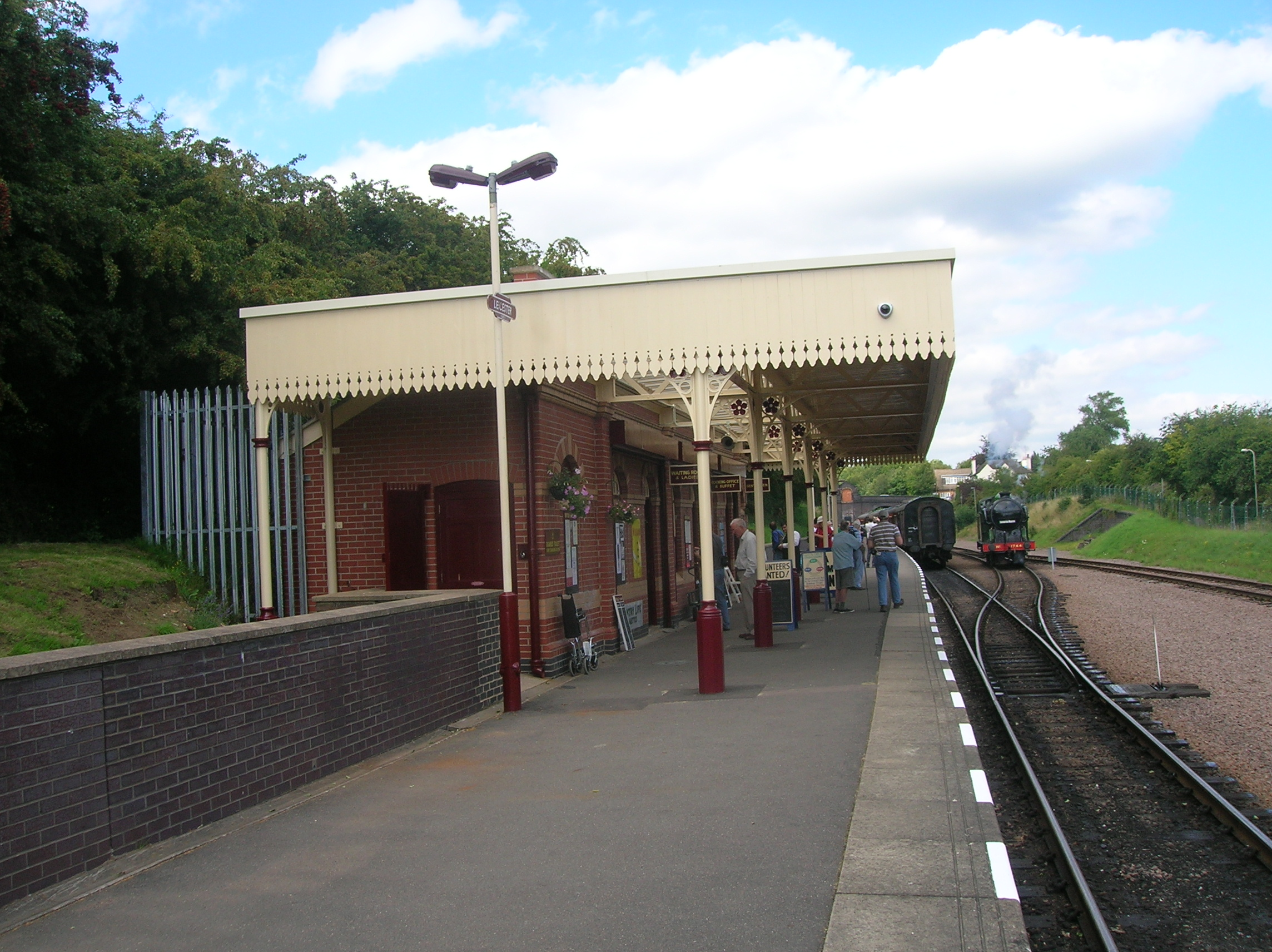
The new canopy at Leicester North on 16 August 2009. In the distance is preserved GNR Class N2 Tank 1744, which featured at the official opening ten days previously.

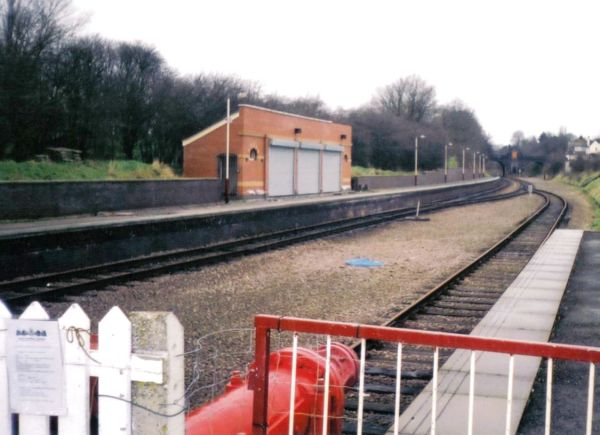
Overview of the station from the public entrance in 2001. Note the new station building and the old Belgrave and Birstall bridge in the background

The Birstall Extension finally arrived at the bare platform of Belgrave and Birstall station during spring 1988. Only sufficient track was laid against the existing platform to enable its demolition. Delays in completing the road from the new Leicester Western Distributor Road caused further delays by preventing the delivery of ballast for packing. Feasibility studies for the industrial museum were put on hold, which in turn required the retainment of the island platform for longer than planned. In early 1989, plans were submitted for extending track from the limit of the existing LRO into the land under jurisdiction of Leicester City Council. The eventual outcome was that Charnwood Borough Council (the GCR's landlord up to Birstall) and Leicester City Council came to an arrangement for a slight extension of the railway into Leicester, and a new LRO was submitted before Parliament for a new Leicester North Station.

Throughout 1989, ballast was brought in and deposited on the Belgrave and Birstall platform for loading into rail ballast wagons, which then ferried the material along the extension to enable the new track to be correctly packed and aligned so that it would be fit for passenger traffic. All this allowed the Birstall Extension to be officially opened on Thursday 15 November 1990. GCR locomotive No.506 "Butler Henderson" hauled a train of MLST directors and local civic dignitaries from Loughborough Central to Rothley, where they changed to a specially fitted push-pull train for the return ride to Belgrave and Birstall. Regular passenger services, push-pull operated, soon resumed to a point just short of the old platform.

Work commenced on removing the old platform and building the new Leicester North station to the south. On 5 July 1991 the new station was opening by the Rt.Hon. Michael Heseltine MP, flanked by the replica of Stephenson's Rocket and No.35005 Canadian Pacific, each running into its own platform at Leicester North. The inclusion of a run-round loop at Leicester North removed the need for push-pull operation between Birstall and Rothley and through services from Loughborough Central could begin. The buffers set into the end of the platform were donated by British Rail and originate from London's Marylebone station, the terminus of the Great Central Railway's London Extension. Due to the lack of station buildings, a carriage was regularly used to act as a ticket office and kiosk.

Full planning permission was granted on 7 October 1992, for the construction of the main building, concourse and overall roof at Leicester North station., however after it was discovered that a high-pressure water main ran through the site the plans were dropped.

Development of the station since opening has been slow due to the return of vandalism. The problems of travellers camping on the small car park at the top of "The Sidings" access road was remedied in 1998 by the installation of a lockable gate.

In late 1998, planning permission was granted for a modest construction on the down platform, intended as waiting room, booking office and toilet. Permission was also granted for a canopy, however it was not intended to erect this at the same time as the building, the whole approach for Leicester North development having switched to a modular approach. Following a £30,000 bequest to the MLST by the Edith Murphy Trust, only £20,000 remained to be raised at the time the drawings of the new building were first published The ceremonial "Cutting of the first sod" by the Countess of Lanesborough took place on 9 March 1999 as part of the railway's centenary celebrations, with contractors beginning work on the foundations on 19 April and was completed by late June.

Construction progress was hindered by repeat vandalism, with the toppling of freshly laid brickwork on several occasions. Brickwork was complete to roof level by late January 2000, with a variety of fitting-out, including connection to services and the installation of roller-shutter doors, plastering, and decoration, taking place throughout mid-2000. Shortly after, however, the contractor was unable to continue work, and further progress would not take place until July 2001 after a new contractor was assigned to complete the building and tarmac the platform. The building opened for public use soon after.

No substantial further development of the station has taken place since the opening of the waiting rooms, although a variety of small additions including picnic tables have been added to the station in recent years. A small canopy (pictured above) was built around the station building. An ambitious set of features was originally planned, including a second engine shed, a turntable, garden and another platform.

On 8 December 2012 it was announced that an annex to the National Railway Museum would be built close to Leicester North, these plans were cancelled in 2017 after funding arrangements fell through.

Preceding station	Heritage railways	Following station
Rothley towards Loughborough Central	Great Central Railway Leicestershire section	Terminus
