= Main Line Preservation Group =

The Main Line Preservation Group was an organisation formed in 1968, "to acquire a suitable length of main line, for the operation of steam hauled passenger trains, at realistic speeds". The organisation's contemporary literature and advertising claimed that it was negotiating with British Railways for 18 miles of the former Great Central Main Line between Leicester and Ruddington.

In time, this stated ambition was largely achieved in the form of the Great Central Railway (heritage railway).
