= Loughborough Central railway station =

Station in Leicestershire, England

Loughborough Central
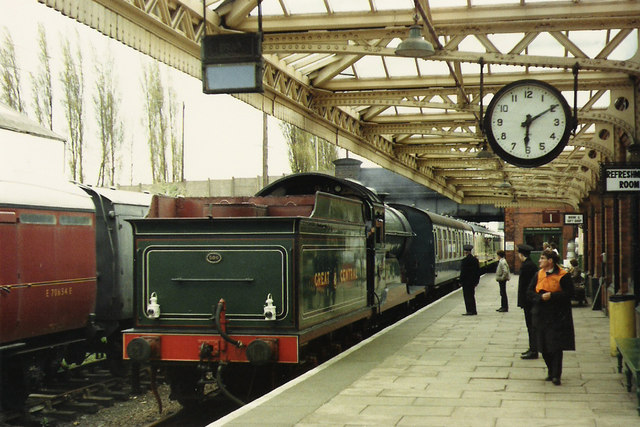
- Platform and clock

General information
- Location: Loughborough, Leicestershire; England
- Coordinates: 52.7686°N 1.1959°W
- Grid reference: SK543193
- System: Station on heritage railway
- Operator: Great Central Railway (preserved)
- Platforms: 2 (1 Island)

History
- Original company: Great Central Railway
- Post-grouping: London and North Eastern Railway

Key dates
- 15 March 1899: opened
- 5 May 1969: closed
- 23 March 1974: reopened
Location

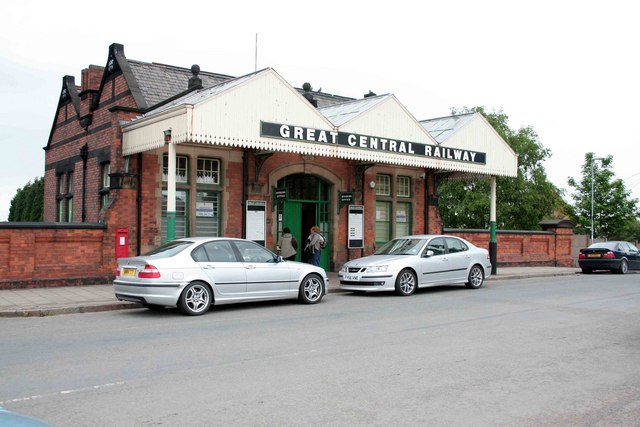
Entrance to station

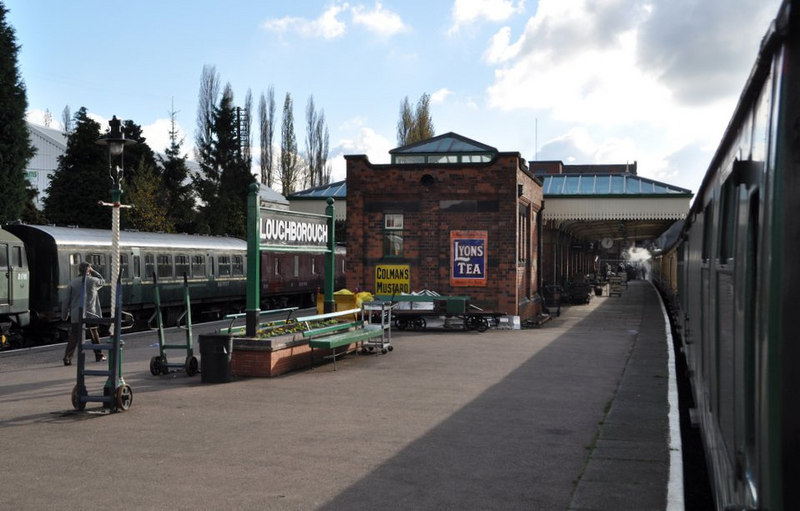
Platforms

Loughborough Central Station is a railway station on the Great Central Railway and the Great Central Railway (heritage railway) serving Loughborough.

== History ==
The station was opened by the Great Central Railway on 15 March 1899, built to the standard GCR arrangement of having an island platform set between the two main running lines. The platforms are 400 feet (120 m) long, capable of accommodating consists of up to 6 coaches and/or mail vans. The station buildings are unique on the preserved railway, the only station with a complete canopy, the longest in railway preservation. The station was closed by British Rail under the Beeching Axe, on 5 May 1969.

Reopened by the Great Central Railway as part of the restored heritage railway in 1974, train services currently run south from the station to Leicester North. Within the station complex, the station buildings, original GCR signal box sited to the north, and the three original water tanks are all Grade II listed.

=== Station masters ===
- Walter Tate
- P.B. Hand ca. 1929 - 1931 (afterwards station master at Luton)
- Henry Ernest Algar 1931 - 1937 (formerly station master at Nottingham High Level station)
- A. Smith 1937 - ???? (formerly station master at Bingham)

== Station facilities ==
Original station facilities include: ladies' waiting room and powder room; general waiting room; gentlemen's toilets; and a refreshment room/cafe. In 2009, a £20,000 grant allowed the station to have new toilets, and a lift in the entrance hall to be installed for the benefits of the disabled visitors. The railway society have also added a book and gift shop, a museum, and an emporium/shop.

All stations on the preserved Great Central Railway are set in a specific era; at Loughborough this era is the 1950s. Many artefacts around the station aid in this atmosphere, including original and recreated British Railways posters, British Railways totem poles, a 1950s TV showing 1950s transportation films in the general waiting room, and a display of 1950s platform trolleys and bicycles.

The station also plays host to the command centre of the heritage railway operations, from which the Duty Traffic Manager organizes all movements which take place on the railway from the Station Master's Office.

== Media ==
The station has appeared in many film and television programmes, chosen for its retro aesthetic, such as Enigma, Shadowlands and Cemetery Junction. The station and Great Central Railway line were also featured in the fourth episode of the 17th series of BBC's Top Gear programme, shown on 17 July 2011 during a train/car feature, which was filmed in June 2011.

== Engine shed ==
From a long fenced pathway alongside the northward line, the engine shed can be viewed. This large 3-road building has to accommodate both residential and visiting motive power, as well as serving as a workshop. Unlike most other railways, it is possible to go inside and see "most" of the steam locomotives in various stages of completion. Only the third road is inaccessible to the general public.

The current Loughborough Gap project will result in the shed being demolished, due to its position intercepting the line to Ruddington. The replacement is a 10-road from Workington in Cumbria, which will be rebuilt brick-by-brick into an 8-road shed, which could have enough storage for 16 large tender engines. The brownfield site on which it will eventually be built, will include the shed itself (half of which will be converted into a workshop), a second carriage works, storage sidings and an education centre for school groups.

== See also ==
- Loughborough railway station - formerly Loughborough Midland.

Preceding station	Heritage railways	Following station
Terminus	Great Central Railway Leicestershire section	Quorn and Woodhouse towards Leicester North
Proposed extension
Loughborough towards Ruddington Fields	Great Central Railway	Quorn and Woodhouse towards Leicester North
Disused railways
East Leake; Line open, station closed	Great Central Railway; London Extension	Quorn and Woodhouse; Line and station open
