= Leicester Central railway station =

Disused railway station in Leicestershire, England

Coordinates: 52.6374°N 1.1421°W

Leicester Central
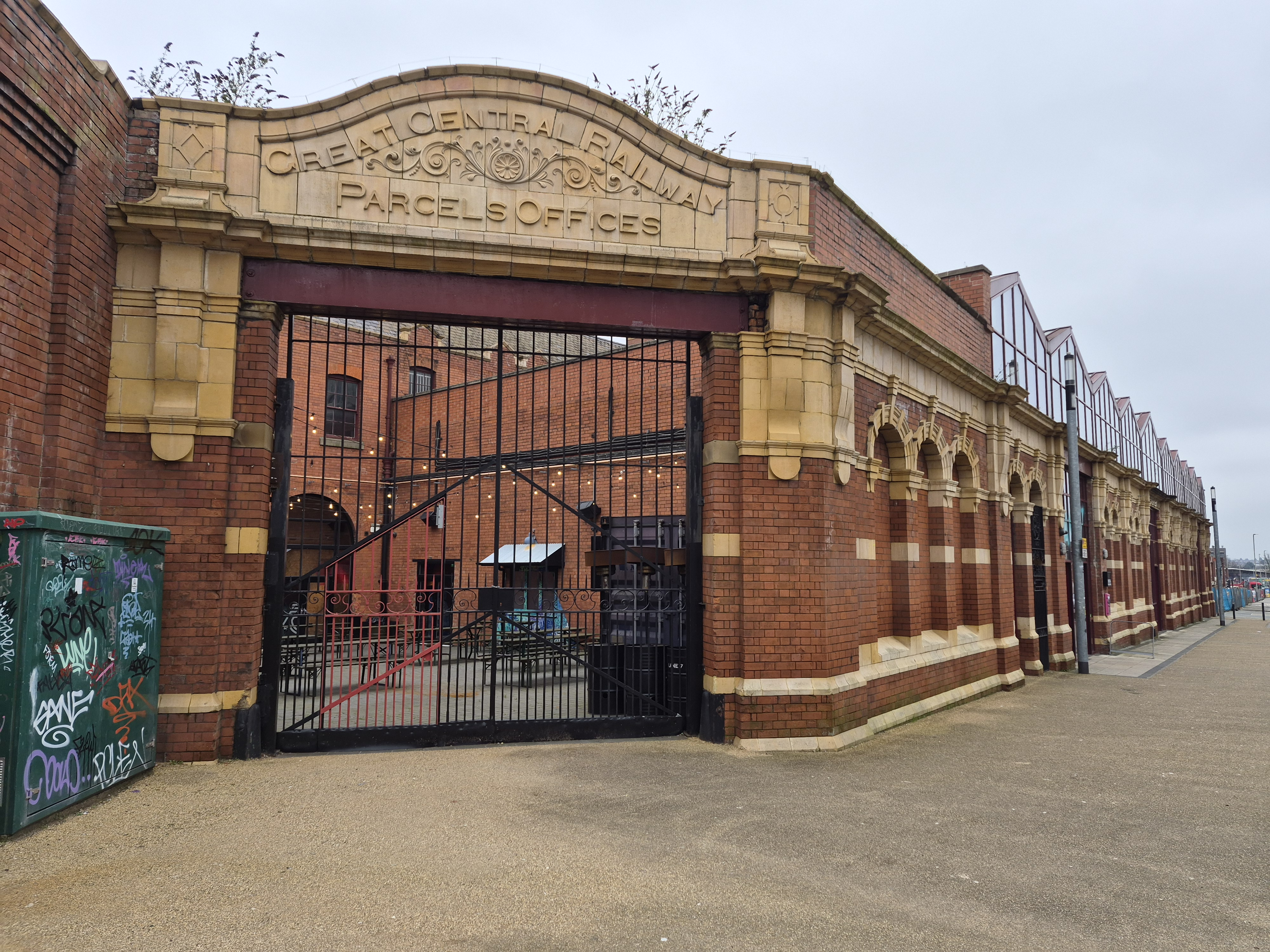
- Leicester Central frontage in 2026

General information
- Location: Frog Island, Leicester, England
- Grid reference: SK580050
- Platforms: 6

Other information
- Status: Disused

History
- Pre-grouping: Great Central Railway
- Post-grouping: London and North Eastern Railway, London Midland Region of British Railways

Key dates
- 15 March 1899: Opened
- 5 May 1969: Closed
Location

Leicester Central was a railway station that served the city of Leicester, in Leicestershire, England, between 1899 and 1969. It was a principal stop on the Great Central Main Line. The station was situated to the west of the city centre, on Great Central Street, which is now just off the inner ring road.

== History ==
=== Construction ===
Opened on 15 March 1899, the station was part of the Great Central Railway's London Extension linking Nottingham Victoria with London Marylebone. The railway crossed built-up Leicester on a Staffordshire blue brick viaduct, incorporating a series of fine girder bridges. In a detail typical of the high standards to which the London Extension was built, the abutments of the girder bridges that crossed public roads were lined in white-glazed tiles to increase the level of light under the bridges. In total, the viaduct was in excess of a mile and a half in length and it was upon this that Leicester Central station would be constructed.

At the time of construction, the station was the largest single building to be erected in Leicester.

The viaduct's construction required a large area of land to be acquired by compulsory purchase, with the GCR agreeing to rehouse at its own expense the inhabitants of around 300 houses which had to be demolished. The area principally affected by the works was the working class Blackfriars district (near modern-day Frog Island), where the slums in Sycamore Lane, Charlotte Street and Friars Road were entirely swept from the map, to be replaced by Great Central Street. Around 250 houses were constructed in Newfoundpool to the west of Leicester.

=== Layout ===
The station was comprised within a south-west facing rectangle, bordered on the one side by Blackfriars Street and Jarvis Street, and on the other side by the new Great Central Street. The tracks ran north-east to south-west, crossing the A50 Northgate Street on a "bowstring" girder bridge before splaying out on either side of a large 1,245 ft H-shaped island-style platform upon which the station was built. Six running lines flanked either side of the station – the up lines on one side and the down lines on the other, with bays at either end to accommodate local workings to Nottingham and Rugby Central. A parcels office and stabling point for locomotives were also incorporated into the site.

The southern end of the new station and its viaduct required building over Jewry Wall Street and some of the houses that stood on it. In 1832 at one of these houses, number 53, a well-preserved and high-quality Roman mosaic floor was uncovered during enlargement of the cellar. The floor was preserved and the owner allowed public access to view the mosaic on request. Although number 53 was demolished the Great Central undertook to preserve the Roman floor within the structure of the southern northbound platform that was built around it. The mosaic was encased in a brick vault topped by a glass ceiling let into the platform so it could be viewed from above. A locked doorway at street level provided access to the vault and a local shopkeeper was entrusted with the key to continue to provide access to the public upon request. The main station entrance was on Great Central Street where a large ornate terracotta-lined archway crowned by an ornate clocktower led through to the entrance hall and cab waiting area; the station frontage itself had a red brick and terracotta facade, to the left of which was the entrance to the parcels office. A second entrance was in Jarvis Street where a subway 20 ft below the platforms led through to the main booking hall, a light and airy space topped by a glazed roof. Stairs led up to the platforms, whilst a hydraulic lift was used to transport luggage from the booking hall.

Preceding station	Disused railways	Following station
Whetstone; Line and station closed	Great Central Railway; London Extension	Belgrave and Birstall; Line and station closed

=== Decline ===
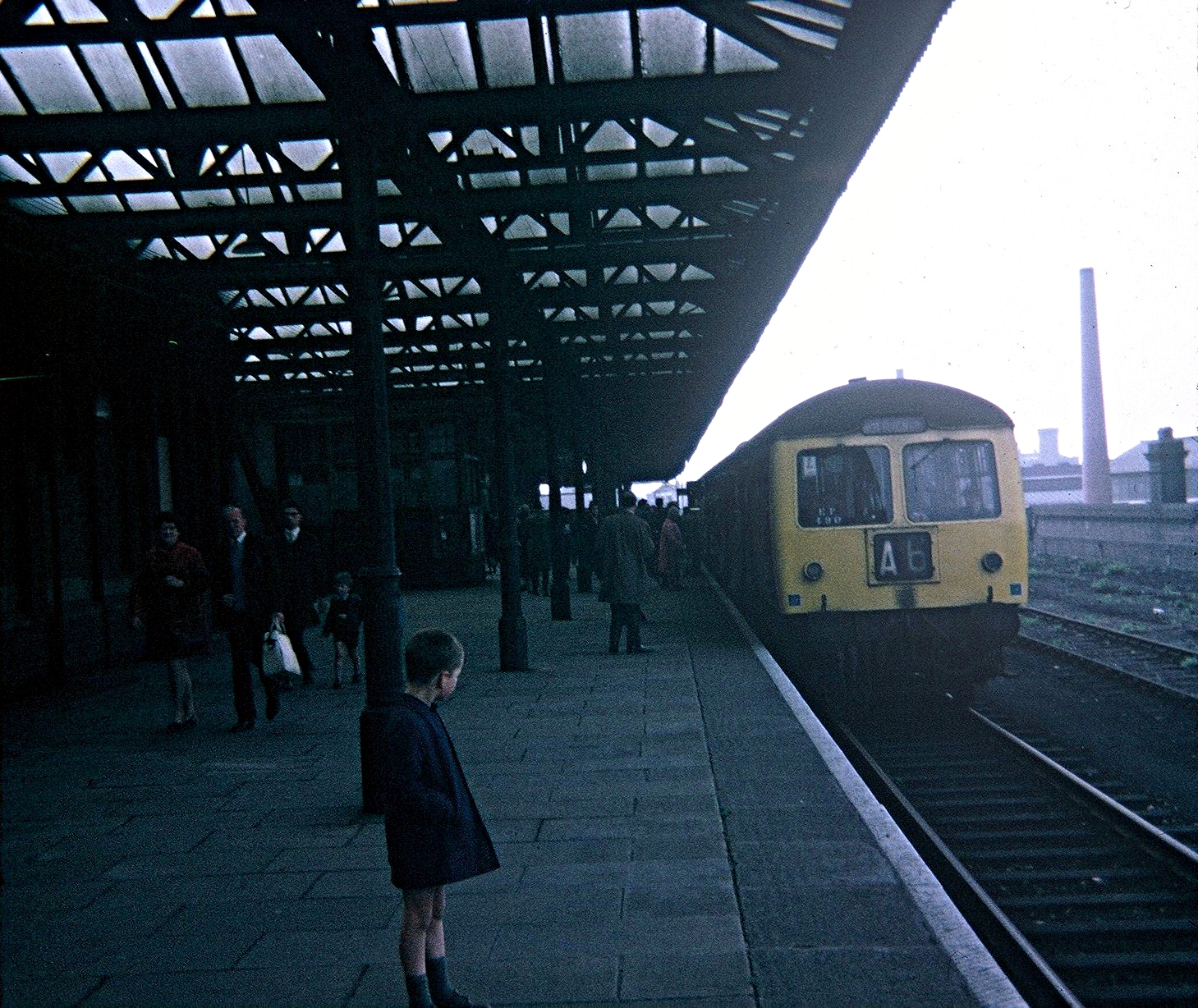
The last ever train to call at Leicester Central on Saturday 3 May 1969

Upon nationalisation of the railways in 1947, the Great Central passed from the control of the London and North Eastern Railway into the newly created Eastern Region of British Railways, and then in 1958 to the London Midland Region. The line was regarded by its new operators as an unnecessary duplication of existing north–south routes, and services began gradually to be run down. The Leicester Central engine shed played host to increasingly old and worn-out locomotives; in 1958, the engine roster was made up of 11 LMS Stanier Class 5 4-6-0s, 3 LMS Stanier Class 4 2-6-4s, 2 BR Class 5 4-6-0s and 1 0-6-0 diesel shunter.

The publication of the Beeching Report in 1963 saw the Great Central identified as an unremunerative line, earning less than £5,000 per week in revenue, and it was proposed to withdraw passenger services from the line as far as Banbury. So began "several years of deliberate neglect and decline and retrenchment" designed to reduce the former busy trunk route to a state whereby closure could be easily achieved. It was announced that, as from March 1964, 12 stations on the Great Central Main Line (including Leicester Central) would close on Sundays, allegedly saving £250,000; 200 objections were lodged against the proposal and representations were made by local authorities to members of parliament.

The engine shed closed in 1964 and freight services were withdrawn from the line in June 1965. On 3 September 1966, the line ceased to be a trunk route with the withdrawal of services to Sheffield Victoria and Marylebone, leaving Leicester Central operating a sparse diesel multiple unit local service to Nottingham Victoria and Rugby Central. The line north of Nottingham would be closed and the track lifted, as would most of the track between Rugby and Calvert. In the last few months before its own closure on 5 May 1969, the station was little but an unstaffed halt.

=== Post-closure ===
During 1970 Leicester Central's platform buildings, canopies and platforms were demolished and replaced by industrial premises; the signalboxes were removed and the site of the turntable became a car park. The former booking offices were reused as part of a business; the station's clocktower had previously been removed by British Rail. Much of the Great Central's viaduct through Leicester had been demolished by the beginning of the 1980s and the bowstring bridge over Northgate Street was dismantled in 1981. The Roman pavement was removed from the site in 1976 and is now on display in the close by Old Jewry Wall Museum, about 100 metres (110 yards) from its original location.

== The site today ==
The station buildings remained largely intact until the 2000s, but are now scheduled to be restored as part of the regeneration of the waterside area. The arches will be made into shops. The front taxi waiting area still stands, and has its original lights and glass roof. The booking office with ticket windows is intact and old timetables and signs are still on the wall. There is a Great Central Railway sign above the entrance to the former parcels office.

Since October 2020, part of the building has been used as a venue for a Lane 7 bowling alley.

== Gallery ==
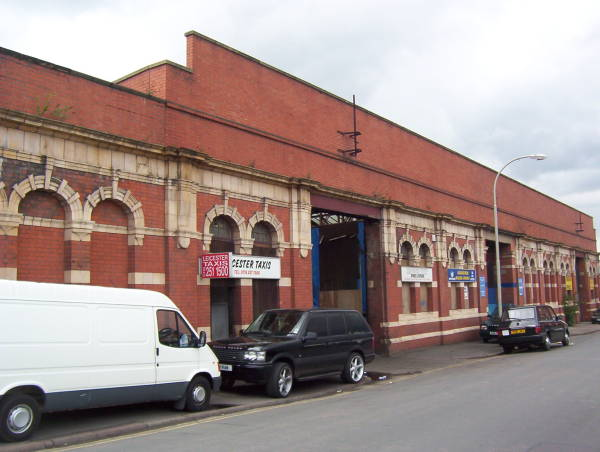
Entrance in 2002

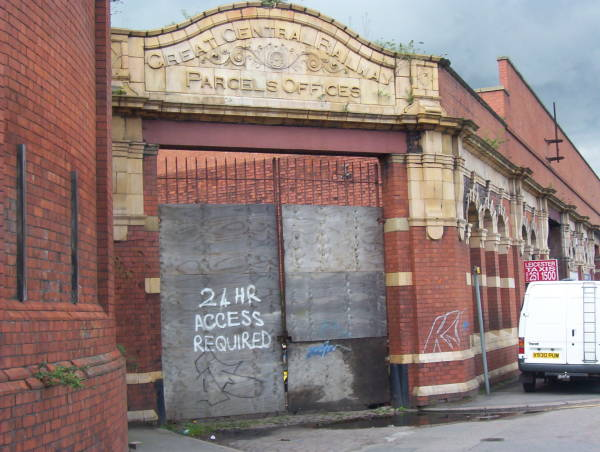
Gateway to the former parcels office in 2002

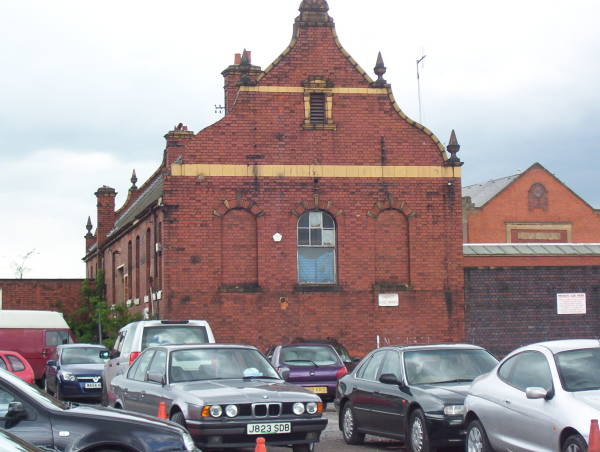
Parcels office, looking north in 2002

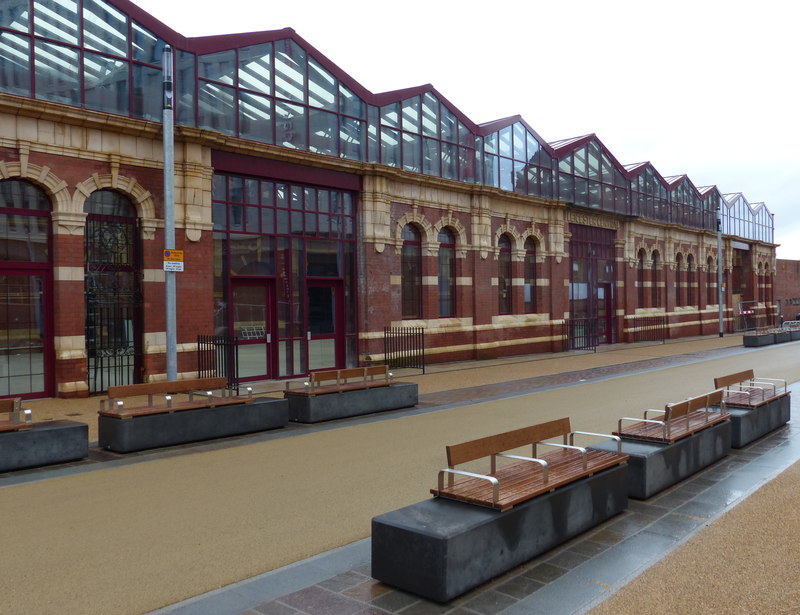
Entrance in 2022
