= Nottingham Arkwright Street railway station =

Former railway station in Nottinghamshire, England

Coordinates: 52.9445°N 1.1469°W

Nottingham Arkwright Street
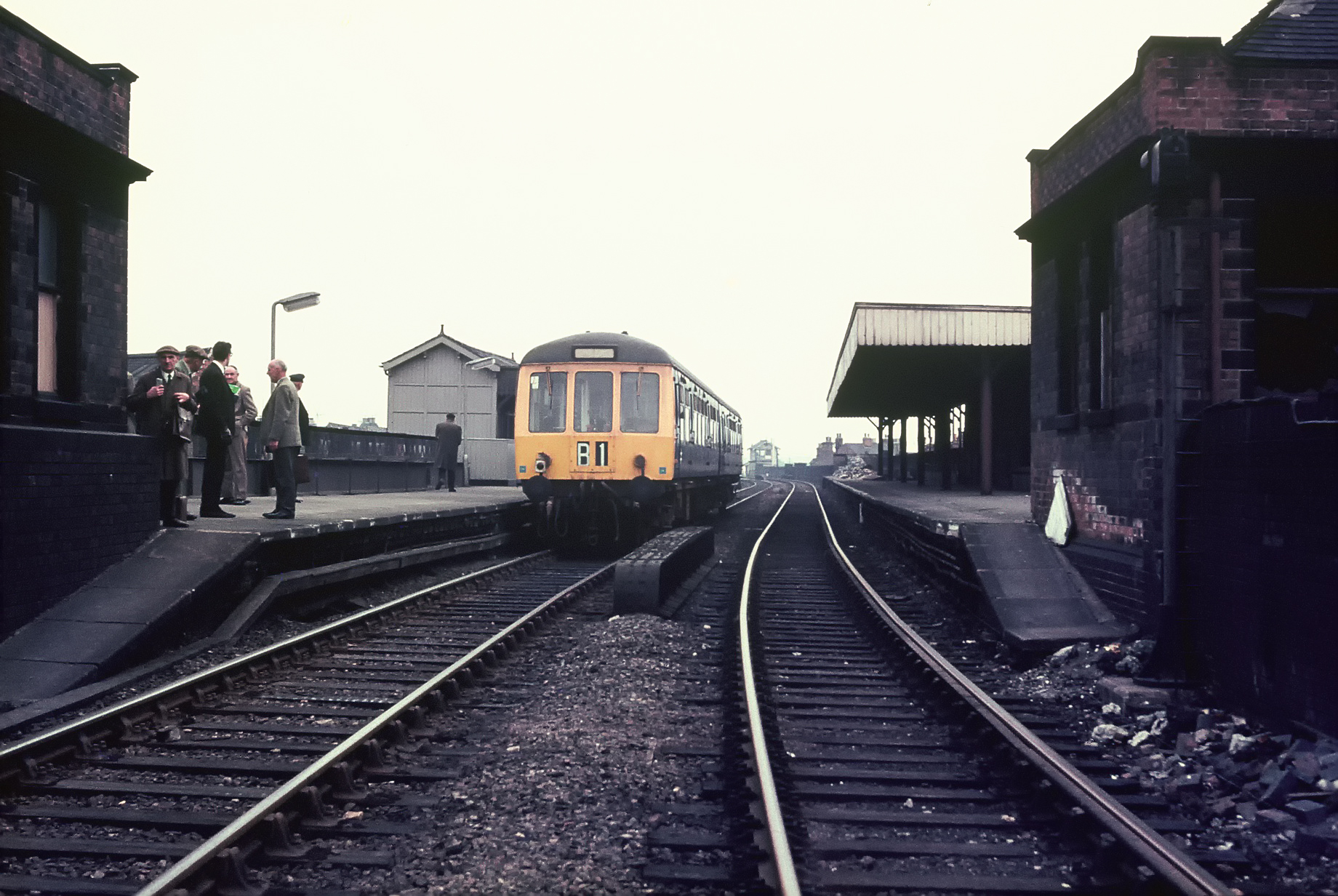
- The station in 1968

General information
- Location: Nottingham, City of Nottingham, England
- Grid reference: SK57193821
- Platforms: 2

Other information
- Status: Disused

History
- Original company: Great Central Railway
- Pre-grouping: Great Central Railway
- Post-grouping: London and North Eastern Railway

Key dates
- 15 March 1899: Opened as Arkwright Street
- 24 May 1900: Renamed Nottingham Arkwright Street
- 4 March 1963: Closed
- 4 September 1967: Reopened
- 5 May 1969: Closed
Location

Nottingham Arkwright Street was a railway station in Nottingham, Nottinghamshire, England. It was a stop on the former Great Central Main Line, which connected Manchester London Road with London Marylebone. The station opened with the line in 1899 and closed in 1963, as part of rationalisation; it reopened four years later upon the closure of Nottingham Victoria, only to close permanently in 1969.

== History ==
=== Opening ===
Nottingham Arkwright Street was built by the Great Central Railway and opened in 1899. It formed part of the long approach viaducts to the south of the city, running from Queen's Walk Yard to Thurland Street Tunnel. As a result of being atop the viaducts, it was one of only two examples of the original intermediate stations (together with Carrington) on the Great Central's London Extension not to be constructed to the favoured island platform design, which facilitated future development. The station was built with twin side wooden platforms instead, which were cantilevered out from the viaduct and approached by steps leading up from Arkwright Street.

Whilst the line was only double track through Arkwright Street, the railway was quadrupled immediately to the south for a distance of about half a mile. This bisected an area of roughly 33 acres (130,000 m^{2}), running parallel to Queen's Walk, and hence the area was known as Queen's Walk Yard. A carriage shed and locomotive depot, including a shed capable of accommodating 16 engines, were constructed on the up side, with a warehouse and goods, coal and timber yards on the down side. The engine shed closed in 1909, due to the higher water rates imposed by Nottingham City, with locomotives moved to the larger Annesley shed to the north of the city. The goods yard boasted one of the first goliath travelling cranes in England; it was electrically driven with a span of 60 feet (18 m), a headroom of 21 feet (6.4 m) and capable of lifting a full load of 25 tons at a rate of five feet per minute. From Queen's Walk Yard, there was also a short branch line to Clifton colliery.

Passenger services commenced on the Great Central on 15 March 1899, with Arkwright Street as the line's temporary northern terminus pending the completion of Nottingham Victoria.

Preceding station	Disused railways	Following station
Ruddington; Line and station closed	Great Central Railway; London Extension	Nottingham Victoria; Line and station closed

=== Decline and closure ===
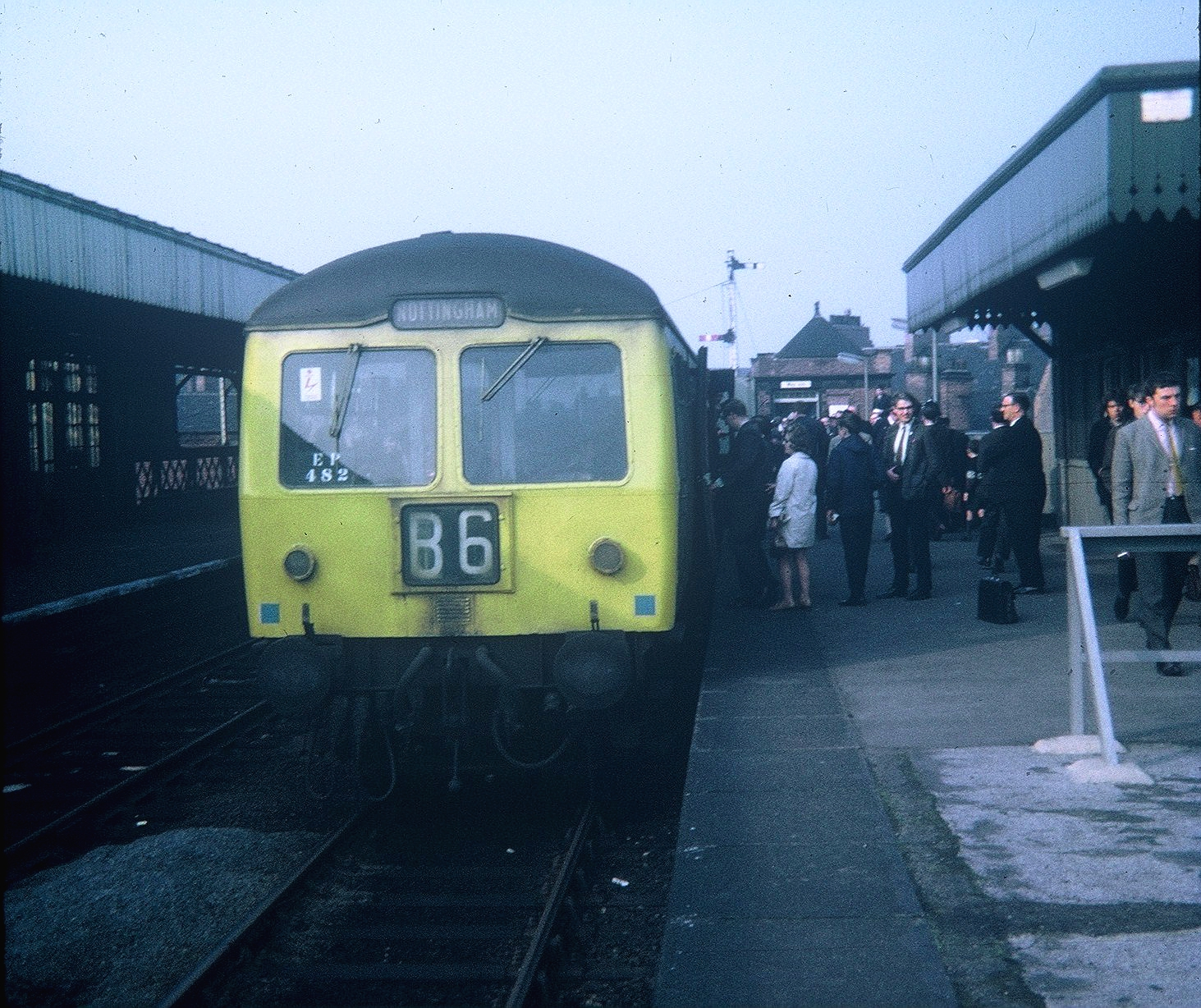
The last train to depart from Arkwright Street on Saturday 3 May 1969

The more centrally-situated Nottingham Victoria was to supersede Arkwright Street which was to close in 1963 having been recommended for closure in the Beeching Report along with many other local stations on the route.

In 1966, however, the Great Central Main Line was closed as a through-route, with the only passenger trains to be retained being a diesel multiple unit service between Nottingham and Rugby Central. Consequently, British Rail closed Nottingham Victoria station in 1967, selling the lucrative city centre property for redevelopment; hence Arkwright Street station was hastily reopened (one platform only) to provide the northern terminus of this truncated route. The station was served by six diesel multiple units mainly during peak hours.

All passenger services on the line were withdrawn in May 1969, with the last DMU departing on May 3 1969, and Arkwright Street station consequently closed on a permanent basis. Goods trains continued to pass through until 1973.

== The site today ==
The station and viaducts carrying the railway were demolished around 1975 and the area was comprehensively redeveloped leaving no trace of the railway that ran through the Meadows.

The Great Central Railway (heritage railway) has hopes of extending their current terminus at Ruddington Fields to Ruddington. However, they do not plan to reopen the line towards Nottingham Arkwright Street; this is mostly in part due to the Nottingham Express Transit trams running on the line, with the station site at Arkwright Street having been built over and used for road alignments.
