= Nottingham station =

Transport interchange serving the city of Nottingham, England

Nottingham
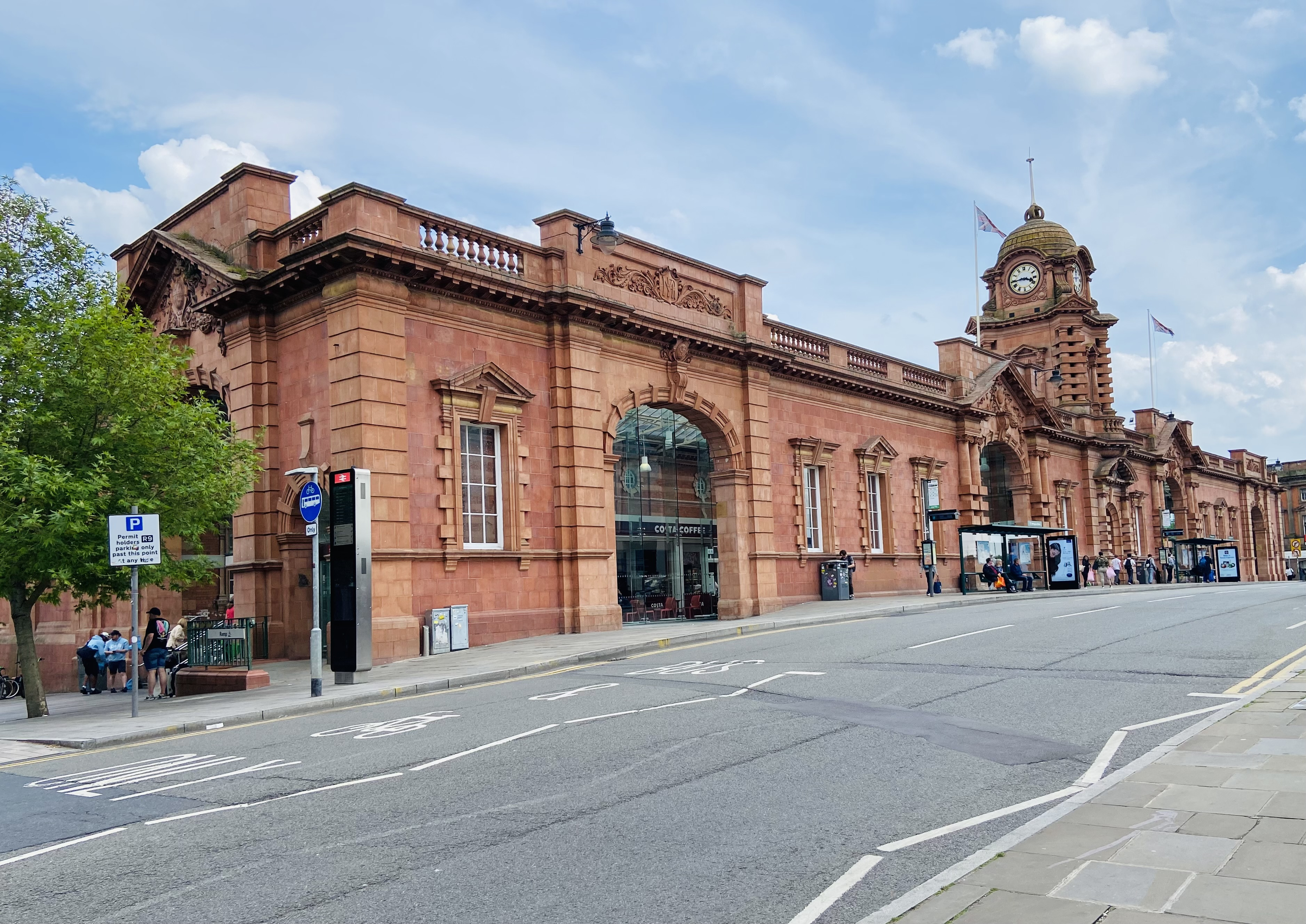
- Frontage

General information
- Location: Nottingham; England
- Coordinates: 52.947°N 1.146°W
- Grid reference: SK575392
- Manager: East Midlands Railway
- Platforms: 9 (7 National Rail & 2 NET (tram))

Other information
- Station code: NOT
- Classification: DfT category B

History
- Original company: Midland Railway
- Pre-grouping: Midland Railway
- Post-grouping: London, Midland and Scottish Railway

Key dates
- 22 May 1848: Opened as Nottingham
- 16 January 1904: New building opened
- 25 September 1950: Renamed Nottingham City
- 18 June 1951: Renamed Nottingham Midland
- 5 May 1969: Renamed Nottingham
- 9 March 2004: Station Street tram stop opened
- 2011–2014: Redeveloped
- 27 July 2015: Nottingham Station tram stop opened to replace Station Street

Passengers
- 2020/21: ▼1.417 million
- Interchange: ▼0.105 million
- 2021/22: ▲5.202 million
- Interchange: ▲0.323 million
- 2022/23: ▲6.740 million
- Interchange: ▲0.404 million
- 2023/24: ▲7.145 million
- Interchange: ▲0.498 million
- 2024/25: ▲8.113 million
- Interchange: ▲0.558 million

Listed Building – Grade II*
- Official name: Midland Railway Station
- Designated: 12 July 1972
- Reference no.: 1271301
Location
Notes
- Passenger statistics from the Office of Rail and Road

Nottingham station, briefly known as Nottingham City and for rather longer as Nottingham Midland, is a railway station and tram stop in the city of Nottingham, England. It is the principal railway station of Nottingham. It is also a nodal point on the city's tram system, with a tram stop that was originally called Station Street but is now known as Nottingham Station. It is the busiest station in Nottinghamshire, the busiest in the East Midlands, and the second-busiest in the Midlands after Birmingham New Street.

The station was first built by the Midland Railway (MR) in 1848 and rebuilt by the same company in 1904, with much of the current building dating from the later date. It is now owned by Network Rail and managed by East Midlands Railway (EMR). Besides EMR trains, it is also served by CrossCountry and Northern trains and by Nottingham Express Transit (NET) trams.

The station was one of several that once served the city of Nottingham. Amongst these were the city centre stations of Nottingham Victoria on the Great Central Railway, and Nottingham London Road on the Great Northern Railway; both of these stations are now closed. A number of minor stations served localities outside the city centre, but the only such station to remain open within the city boundaries is Bulwell.

== History ==
=== Early beginnings ===
Nottingham's first station was Carrington Street station, which opened in May 1839, when the Midland Counties Railway opened the line from Nottingham to Derby. This terminus station was situated on the opposite side of Carrington Street from the current station, on a site now occupied by Nottingham Magistrates' Court. The original station gate posts still exist and form the pedestrian entrance to the Magistrates' Courts area.

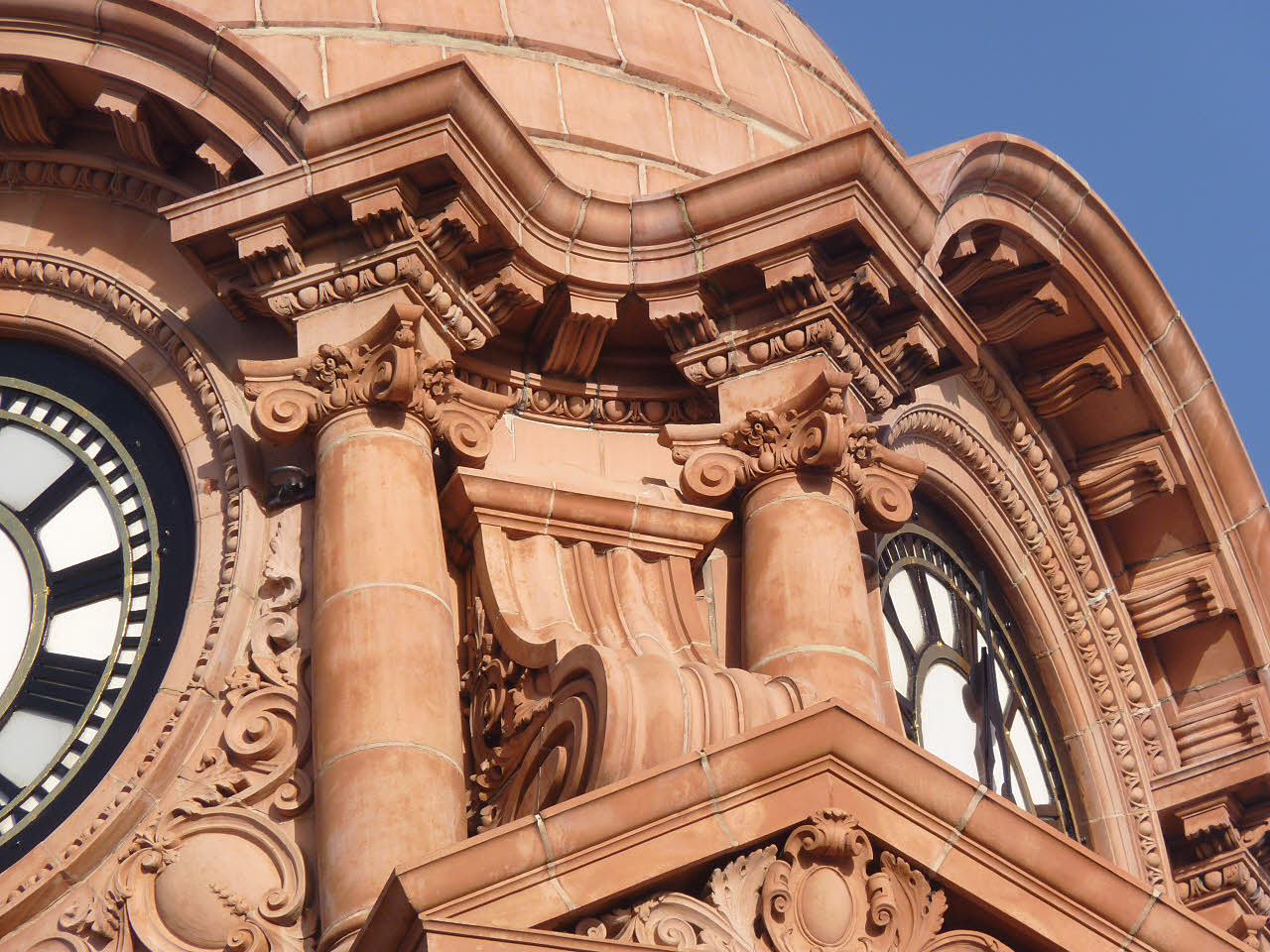
Nottingham Midland Station tower

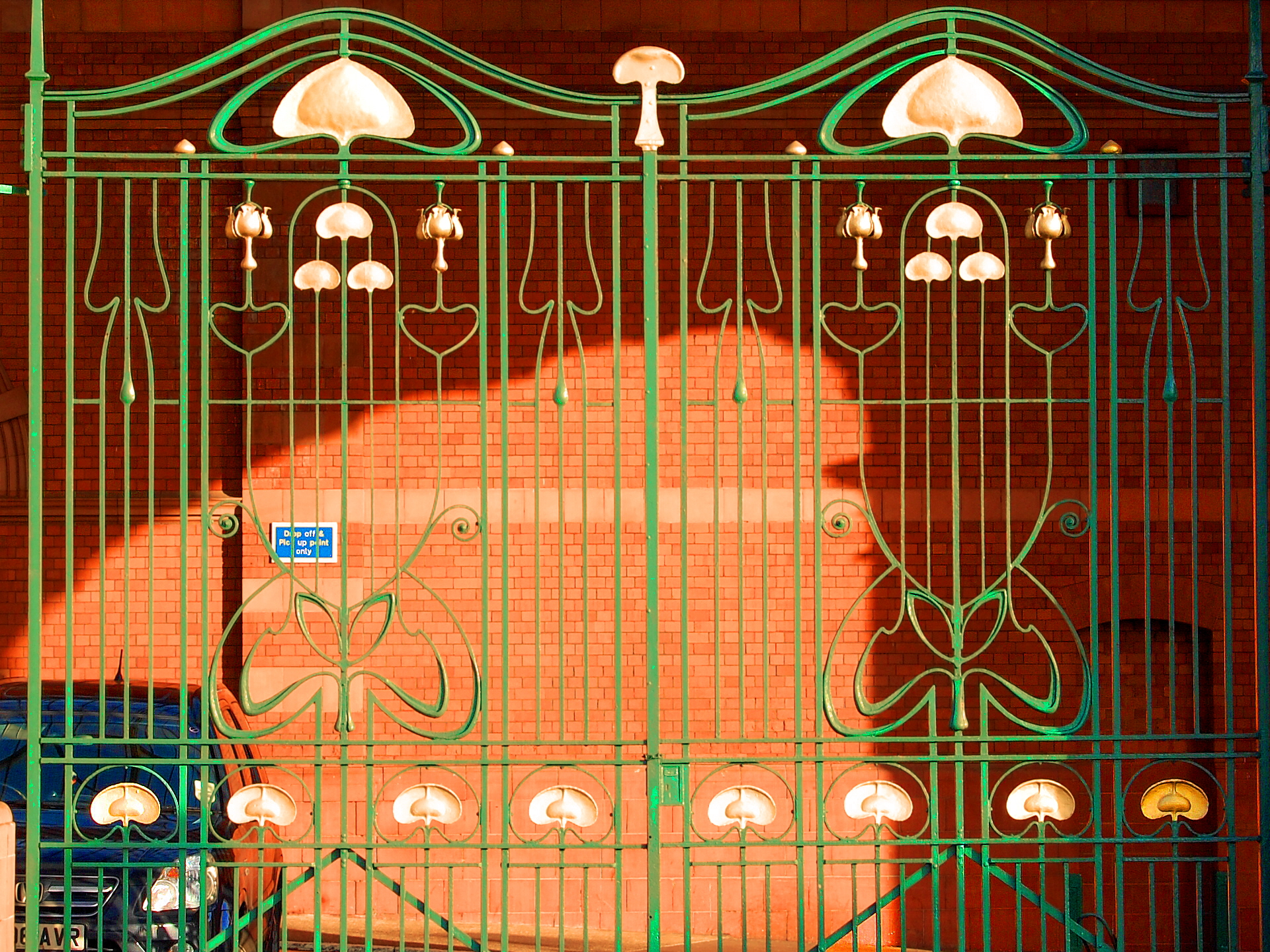
Nottingham station's Art Nouveau gates

=== The 1848 station ===
In 1844 the Midland Counties Railway merged with two others into the Midland Railway. By 1848 the new company had outgrown Carrington Street station and new lines to Lincoln had been opened. A new through station was opened on the current station site on 22 May 1848, replacing the Carrington Street station. George Hall of Derby was the architect, and J.C. Hall of Nottingham the contractor and it had its entrance on Station Street. During 1869 the Midland Railway purchased the West Croft Canal arm, filling it and building additional parallel tracks to south.

During the 1880s, Nottingham station employed 170 staff. Although attractive when it first opened, by the early 20th century the station was quite cramped, having only three platforms.

On 18 August 1896, a light engine, running tender first, was passing through the station when it collided with six empty fish trucks. One of the trucks was thrown off the rails against a cast-iron column supporting the inner ends of the principals of the station roof and, when the column broke, a portion of the roof, measuring about 94 feet (29 m) by 56.5 feet (17.2 m), fell onto the platforms and track. Six people on the platform were injured.

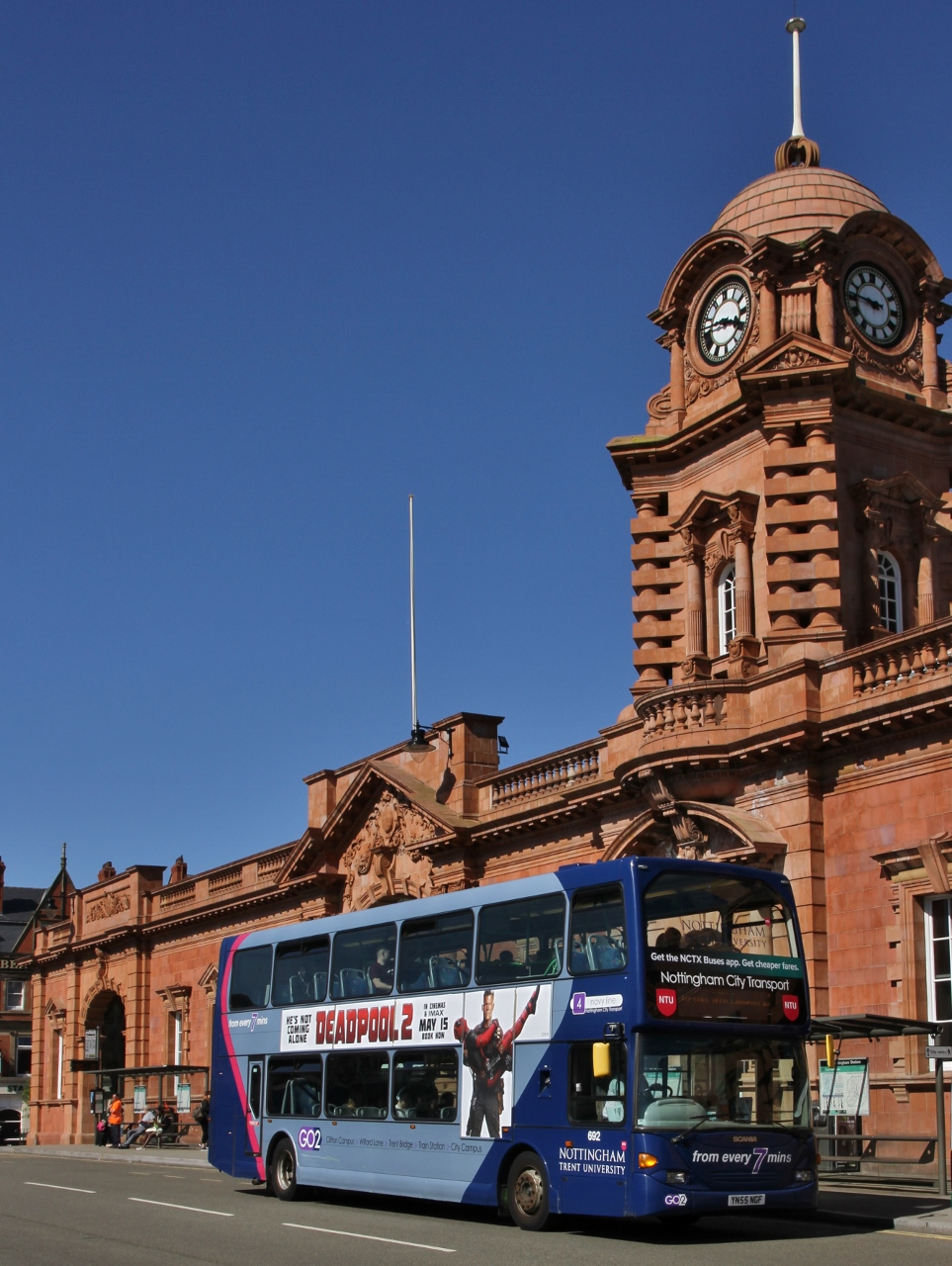
Carrington Street entrance of the Edwardian Nottingham station

=== The 1904 station ===
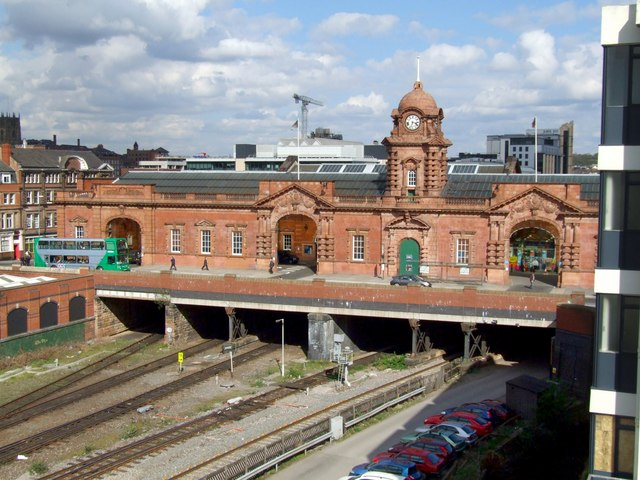
Nottingham Station, arrivals from the western perspective

When the Great Central Railway opened its Nottingham Victoria Station in 1900, the Midland Railway appointed Albert Edward Lambert, a local Nottingham architect, to rebuild the Midland station. Lambert had been the architect for Great Central's station and, consequently, the two buildings had many similarities in their design. The station was rebuilt largely on the same site as the Station Street station, but the entrance was relocated onto Carrington Street.

The first contract for the station buildings was awarded to Edward Wood and Sons of Derby on 23 January 1903, who were also awarded the contract for the buildings on platforms 1 and 2 on 16 September 1903. The contract for the buildings on platforms 4 and 5 was awarded to Kirk, Knight & Co of Sleaford on 18 June 1903, who were also responsible for building the parcels office (Forward House) on Station Street, which opened in November 1903. The structural steelwork and cast-ironwork was done by Handyside & Co. and the Phoenix Foundry, both of Derby.

The station was built in an Edwardian Baroque Revival style at a cost of £1 million (£105.1 million in 2025) and was described by the Nottingham Evening News on the eve of its opening (16 January 1904) as a "magnificent new block of buildings". The building used a mix of red brick, terracotta (used as a substitute for building stone) and faience (a glazed terracotta), with slate and glazed pitch roofs over the principal buildings. The carriage entrances have Art Nouveau wrought-iron gates.

The station's forebuildings were opened to passengers without any formal ceremony on 17 January 1904, although next day the Evening News reported that the platforms were still in a state of chaos and were not expected to be ready for another nine months. However, it did note that "the result promises to be the provision for Nottingham of one of the most commodious and most convenient passenger stations in the country". The day began with the closure of the booking offices in the old station, after the last tickets were issued for the 5:25 a.m. London train and the new booking offices were opened in time to issue tickets for the 6:25 a.m. Erewash Valley train. No attempt was made to exclude the public from the building and many took the opportunity to view the new station buildings. The Evening News commented on the public's admiration of the style and elegance of the station approaches and booking hall; it went on to describe the day's events.

=== 20th century ===
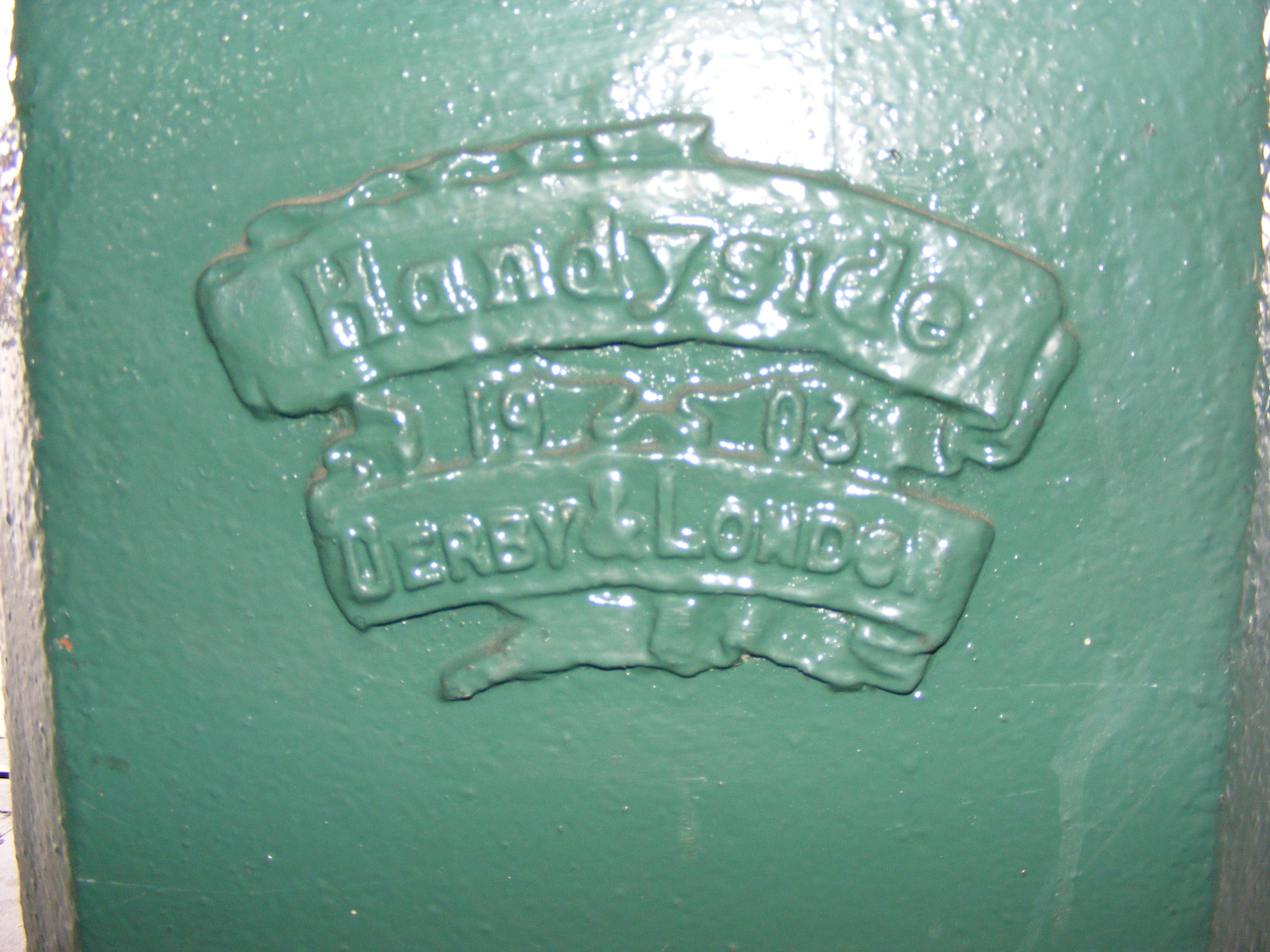
Detail of structural pillar showing the Handyside company logo

The station became the property of the London, Midland and Scottish Railway, under the railway grouping of 1923. On 2 July 1939, the station was targeted by the Irish Republican Army in an attack on eight stations in the Midlands under their S-Plan; the others being Leicester, Derby, Birmingham, Stoke, Coventry, Leamington Spa and Stafford. A bomb was left in a suitcase and exploded at 6:30 a.m. The glass roof of the cloak room and enquiry office was blown away.

The station was nationalised in 1948, under the Transport Act 1947, becoming part of British Railways. Following the privatisation of the railways in the 1990s, ownership was transferred to Railtrack and subsequently to Network Rail.

For many years, the Midland Railway suffered the indignity of its rival, the Great Central Railway, crossing above the station on a 170-foot-long (52 m) bowstring girder bridge. This bridge became redundant in 1973 and was finally dismantled in the early 1980s. The alignment was later used for a new tramway bridge.

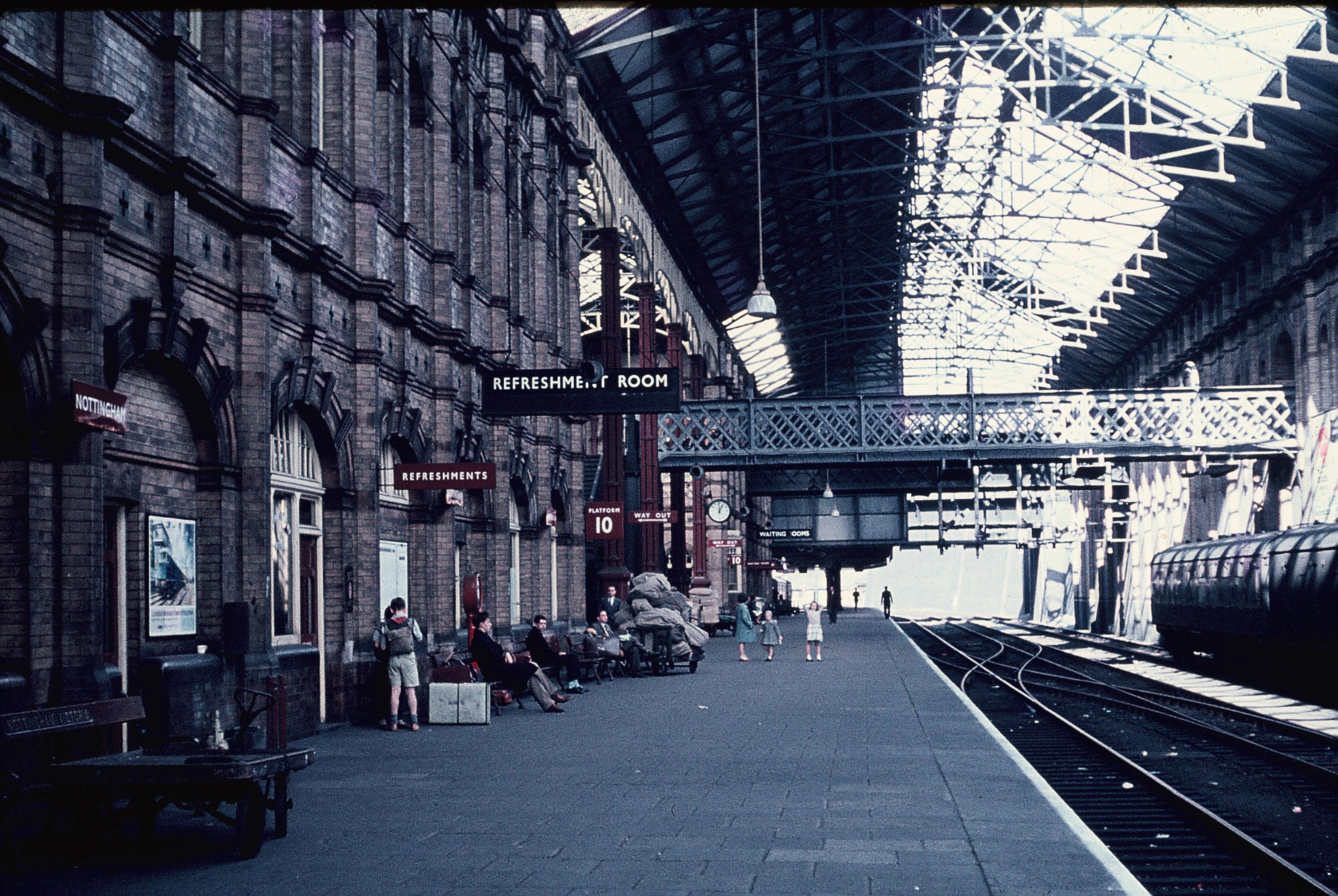
Nottingham Victoria railway station, owned by Great Central Railway. Once a bustling hub of travel, was succeeded by Nottingham Midland Station, which became the city's primary mainline station following its closure

=== Station Street tram stop ===
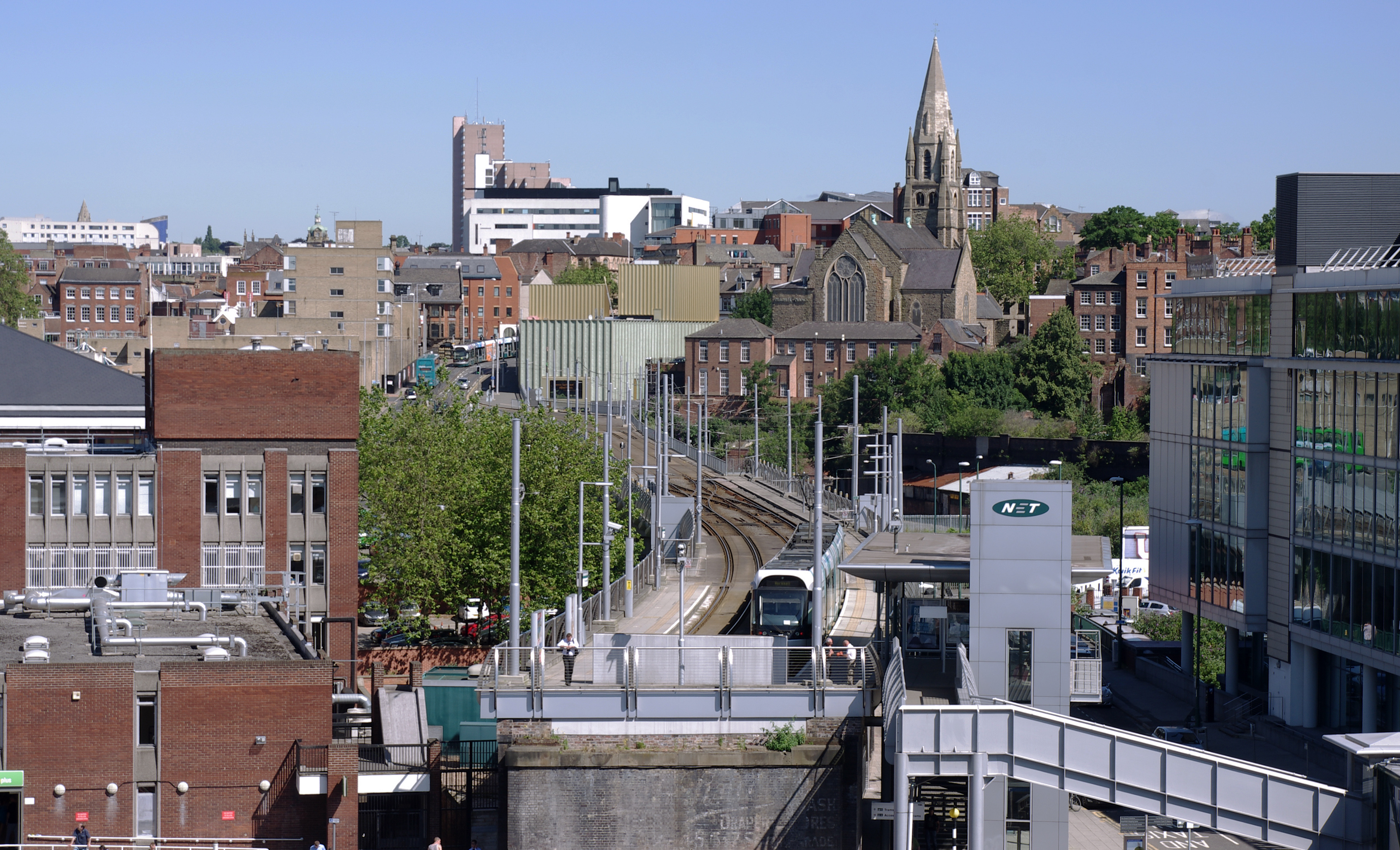
The former Station Street tram stop, before the extension across the station towards the camera

With the opening of the Nottingham Express Transit (NET) in March 2004, Nottingham station became the southern terminus of the new tram line. The actual tram stop was located on Station Street, directly north of Nottingham station and partially over the Nottingham Canal. It was constructed on a separate right-of-way, built on top of part of the old Great Central Main Line viaduct that used to lead northwards to the separate Nottingham Victoria railway station. North of the former stop, the tram route diverged from the old railway route to join an on-street section through the centre of Nottingham. To the south, the route ended at the end of the viaduct, where a since demolished bridge used to carry the Great Central line over the station. In 2012 work started to extend Nottingham Express Transit south towards Toton Lane and Clifton South.

The tram stop itself was substantial, with a small station building containing a waiting area housing steps and a lift to reach the street below. There was also a short footbridge over Station Street, which connected to the main railway station. Up to three trams could be accommodated on the two platform faces; the western platform had a single-length platform, while the eastern platform was an extended double-length platform.

=== Redevelopment ===
Plans for a multi-million pound refurbishment and redevelopment of the station were unveiled by junior government minister Norman Baker on 5 October 2010. Under the scheme, the station's porte-cochère was to be made vehicle-free and the station's Grade II* listed buildings restored. The redevelopment also included the construction of another platform, more shops and a bridge to carry Nottingham Express Transit trams over the top of the station.

==== Funding ====
The redevelopment was initially estimated to cost £67 million. East Midlands Development Agency (EMDA) stated they would contribute £9.5 million to the project, but had to reduce this amount following government cuts. In July 2009, the then Transport Minister, Sadiq Khan, gave conditional approval for the city council to use funds raised from their controversial Workplace Parking Levy to contribute to the redevelopment.

The final funding was reorganised to be around £60 million, with Network Rail contributing £41 million, Nottingham City Council £14.8 million, EMDA £2.1 million, East Midlands Trains £1.6 million and the Railway Heritage Trust £0.5 million.

==== Station masterplan ====
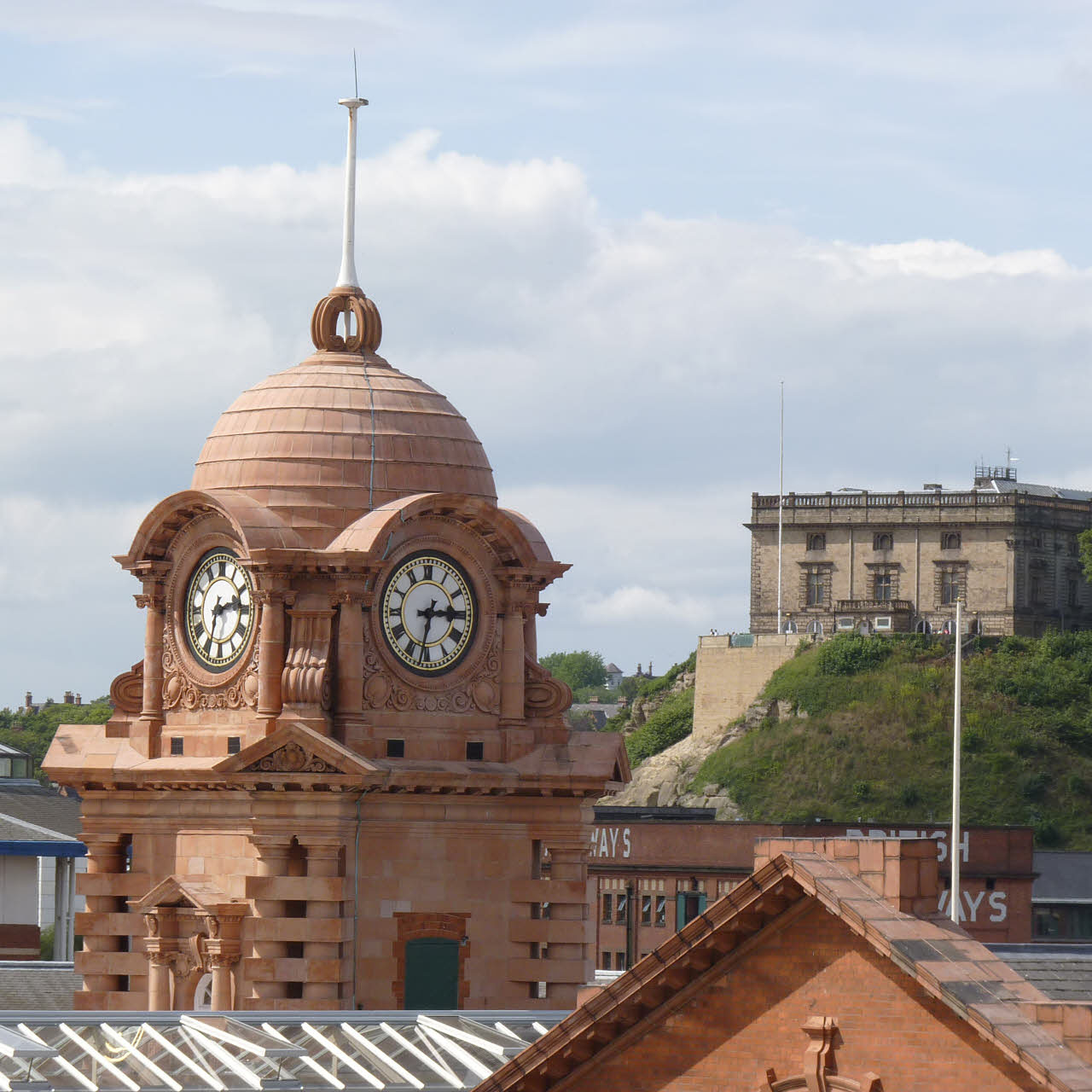
Station tower and Nottingham Castle

In 2001 the architects Building Design Partnership (BDP) were appointed as the lead consultants, using the same team that had redeveloped Manchester Piccadilly based on an estimate of £550,000 and in cooperation with Posford Rail, MVA, Jones Lang LaSalle and Bovis Lend Lease.

- Stage 1 of the Nottingham Station Masterplan cost £99,960 and was launched at Loxley House on 19 July 2002. The main stakeholders at the time were Nottingham City Council, Nottinghamshire County Council, Central Trains, Midland Mainline, Nottingham Development Enterprise, Nottingham Regeneration Limited and the EMDA, which together acted as the Nottingham Railway Station Steering Group.
- State 2a of the masterplan preparation was budgeted to cost £59,940 and also to be undertaken by BDP.

BDP engaged Tuffin Ferraby Taylor to undertake surveys of all elements of the station dating from before 1918. As well as an integrated NET tram station above platform 6, the masterplan included an additional concourse and safeguarding for an additional platform.

==== Car park ====
Between 2011 and 2012, a new multi-storey car park was constructed between platform 6 and Queen's Road, over the western half of the station's existing car park. It was built by Vinci Construction beginning in March 2011 and officially opened on 14 May 2012.

The initial car park design had been put on hold in 2008, after being described as a "chicken coop". The final design for the car park has 2,107 coloured metal sheets on the outside, formed of 2.1-millimetre-thick copper and stainless steel (1.5 mm stainless, 0.6 mm "Luvata" Copper). These panels are affixed to the car park using 8,000 cleats fixed to pre-cast channels in the concrete structure. The new car park building has five storeys and space for 950 cars.

==== Remodelling ====
Schemes costing £19 million (in 2007) and then £14 million (in 2008) were proposed. Remodelling and re-signalling costing £11.6 million were approved on 15 May 2009 by the Network Rail Investment Board and took place as part of Control Period 4 (CP4), between 1 April 2009 and 31 March 2014. Nottingham station was partially closed for ten weeks during 2013 for the track and signalling work. During the blockade, the western end of the station was closed to trains for 37 days and the eastern end for 10 days.

Platform 4 was split to create two platforms. All four tracks at the western end were given bi-directional railway signalling, allowing a better choice of non-conflicting routes. These lines are referred to as Line A, Line B, Line C and Line D. Although all lines are bi-directional, their use is segregated, with services towards Sheffield and Mansfield focused on the northern pair of tracks, and services to Derby and Leicester focused on the southern pair of tracks. Line speeds for trains arriving from Chesterfield and the Robin Hood Line were increased from 35 miles per hour (56 km/h) to 50 miles per hour (80 km/h). On 7 March 2012, Network Rail requested formal "network change" acceptance from the train operating companies.

Change in platform numbering and lengths after remodelling
Platform number	previous	1	2	3	4		5	6
Platform length	previous	409	82	409	373		372	285
Platform number	post-2013	1	2	3	4	5	6	7
Platform length	post-2013	▼343	▲90	▼296	▼112	▼150	▼290	▼268

On-site preparation works began in September 2011, with all new signal structures installed by June 2013 followed by the "Nottingham blockade"; this itself lasted from July 2013 until the handover in September 2013. The work was spread from Beeston, past Mansfield Junction, Nottingham West Junction and to Nottingham East Junction. The blockade covered renewing 5.9 kilometres (3.7 mi) of track and adding or renewing 14 sets of pointwork.

==== Entrances ====
The station has three entrances: Carrington Street (west), Trent Street/Station Street (north), and Queen's Road (south). The north and south entrances are connected by a footbridge and public footpath. The north exit to Trent Street is the most heavily used and where the taxi rank is situated.

1900s

During 1919/1920 the Midland Railway Company inhibited access via the Trent Street exit. On 24 February 1919, a petition "signed by over 1,000 season-ticket holders" was submitted to the Midland Railway Company. Member of Parliament for Nottingham Central Albert Atkey raised numerous questions in the House of Commons, answered by the President of the Board of Trade Auckland Geddes and Minister for Transport Eric Geddes. On 18 August 1919, the Chief Inspector of Railways John Wallace Pringle visited Nottingham Midlands Station "in connection with this matter". By March 1920 local employer Boots the Chemist were offering to pay the Midland Railway £100 (equivalent to £5,100 in 2024) for maintenance of the Trent Street entrance. On 27 April 1920, a petition was submitted to Parliament "signed by the Mayor, Sheriff, and the Town Clerk on behalf of the civic authorities of Nottingham, the Chairman of the Chamber of Commerce, and the members of the Council, and 18,000 other users of the railway".

2024

During October/November 2024, East Midlands Railway (EMR) inhibited access via the Trent Street exit, from platforms 1‒6. From 28 October 2024, EMR had planned to inhibit access from platforms 1–6 (via the footbridge and the public right of way) to both Queen's Road (south) and Trent Street (north) entrances. As of 29 October 2024, access to both entrances remained open, with the planned pilot project under review. Blocking of passenger access to the platforms was in place after 16:30 on 30 October 2024.

Taxi drivers based at the Trent Street exit were not informed of the pilot closure and had seen significantly reduced business. Local members of parliament Nadia Whittome and Lilian Greenwood met with EMR on 1 November 2024. Leader of Nottingham City Council Neghat Khan met with EMR on 12 November 2024 and stated that the closure was "crazy". The pilot was planned to end on 17 November 2024. As of 18 November 2024 access had been re-instated.

2025

As of 19 August 2025 East Midlands Railway (EMR) began inhibiting entrance/exit during evenings and early morning, from platforms 1‒6. Gates between platforms 1‒6 and the footbridge were planned to be closed between 19:00‒06:00 every evening.

==== Footbridge ====
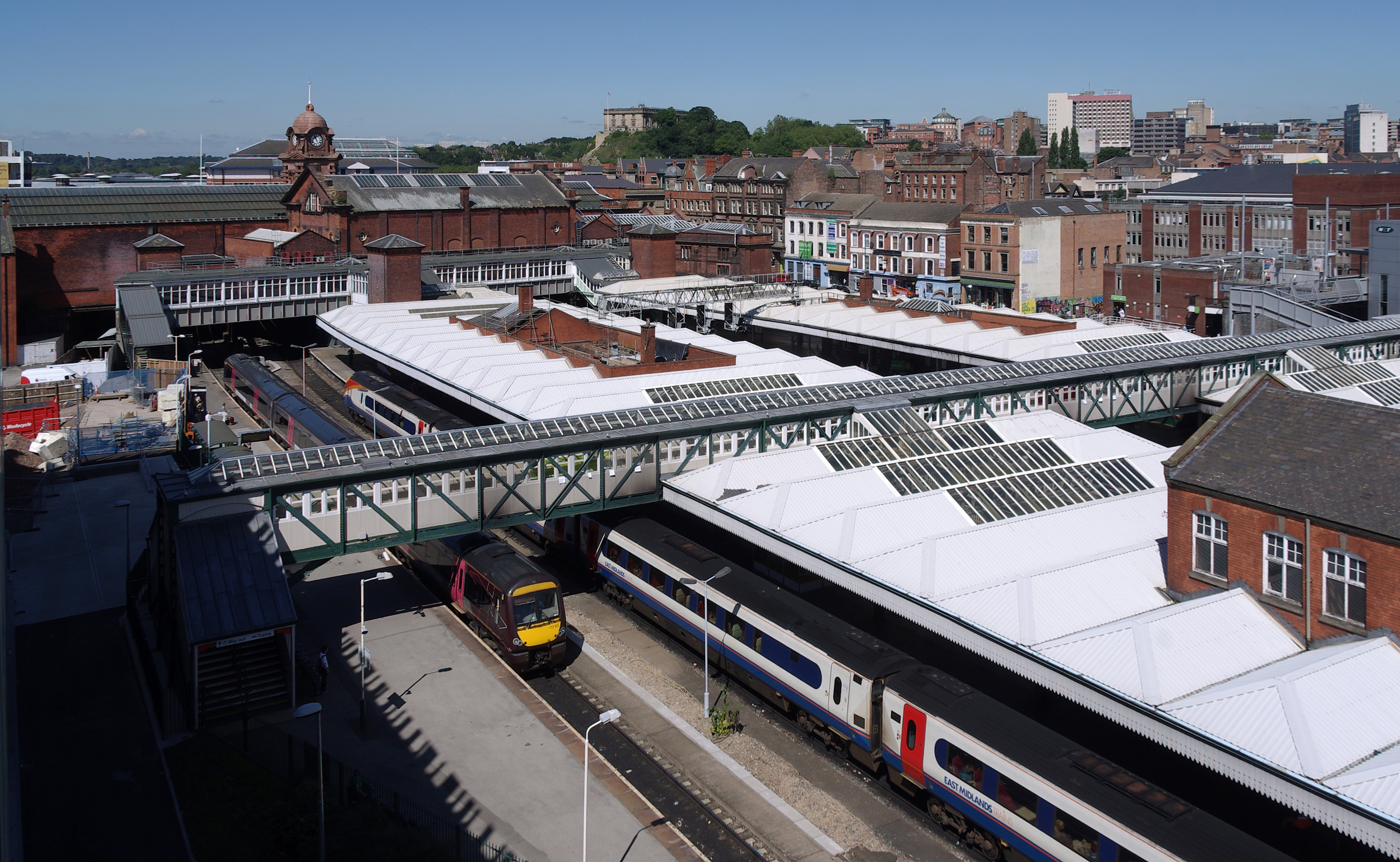
2012: Looking north-west over Nottingham station from newly-built car park; the bridge carrying footpath 28 is mid-shot; beyond it work has just started on the new tram bridge

Halfway along the platforms is an overhead footbridge, running from Station Street (at the north) and the tram stop link over station platforms 1–6 to platform 7 and car parking facilities at Queen's Road (at the south). The footbridge carries footpath 28, the only traffic-free crossing over the Midland Main Line in Nottingham. Footpath 28 was previously diverted from the demolished footbridge 21 to the present footbridge 20B during the 1990s. The original route formed part of the Trent Bridge Footway, between the centre of Nottingham and the river crossing at Trent Bridge. In 2004 Nottingham City Council stated that right of way over the footbridge would be closed, following the completion of a multi-storey car park.

Alternative pavement improvement works were scheduled for Queens Road in February 2009. During 2008–2012, BPR Architects submitted designs for automated ticket gate (ATG) barrier installations at St Pancras, Sheffield, Derby and Nottingham station concourses plus both ends of Nottingham footbridge 20B. BPR's design included four ATG barriers on the north end of the footbridge itself, plus a new enclosure and four barriers between the car park and platform 6 at the south end. A procedure to permanently stop-up the right-of-way commenced on 19 March 2010, A planning application for barriers was filed on 29 March 2010 and withdrawn again on 10 May 2010. Following a public inquiry held during 8–9 November 2011, the stopping up order was denied; the inspector summing up:

Footpath 28 is unique and offers an experience which the alternative, replacement route cannot – a traffic free route within the city, which in addition provides a convenient link for a large number of users to and from residential areas, work places and other facilities. It provides a short but valued opportunity for pedestrians to get away from trafficked routes, with the added amenity value of an historic environment. On balancing the merits and demerits of the stopping up order, I find that the disadvantages and loss likely to arise as a result of the stopping up of the footpath to members of the public generally are such that permanent closure of Footpath 28 to the public is not justified. Thus, I conclude that the Order should not be confirmed.

— Susan Doran BA Hons MIPROW, Inspector appointed by the Secretary of State for Environment, Food and Rural Affairs, Decision Notice §44, 13 December 2011

The footbridge was scheduled to be closed temporarily in November 2017; the reasons given were "making improvements" and "essential maintenance work".

=== New bridge and tram stop ===
To facilitate the Nottingham Express Transit's phase two extension into the south of the city, it was decided to have the tram line cross the station on the line of the original Great Central Railway viaduct, which had been closed to passenger trains in 1967 and goods in 1973. This required a bridge, crossing from the existing Station Street stop, which closed, over both the station and Queen's Road.

Construction of the tram bridge started on 10 April 2012 and the bridge was jacked into place in May 2013. The tram bridge design is a Warren truss design made of 508 to 711 mm (20.0 to 28.0 in) diameter steel tubes. The main bridge is 14.53 m (47.7 ft) wide between the truss centrelines, with two equal spans of 52.12 m (171.0 ft). The bridge is officially called the Karlsruhe Friendship Bridge, after Nottingham's twin city of Karlsruhe, Germany.

The new Nottingham Station tram stop was constructed on the bridge, providing interchange with the railway network. It replaced the previous Station Street tram stop, opened in 2004, which was located approximately 100 metres (330 ft) to the north. The new stop was opened on 27 July 2015 and the former stop closed at the same time, although the intention was to reopen the Station Street access building as a second access to the new stop once it has been refurbished. The new stop served as the new southern terminus of the system until the rest of NET's phase two opened, at which point it became a through station, with trams continuing to new termini in Chilwell and Clifton.

=== 2018 fire ===
On the morning of 12 January 2018, a fire extensively damaged the station buildings. Nottinghamshire Fire and Rescue Service received a call at 6:25 am reporting that a fire had started in the women's toilet in the newly built section of the station. The fire was attended by ten fire engines and 50 firefighters. Firefighters from Derbyshire Fire and Rescue Service also attended, bringing the total to 60.

After the fire began, it spread upwards into the roof of the newly built section of the station, along the station concourse and into the historic station building. There was extensive disruption to trains in the East Midlands area.

British Transport Police stated, later the same day, that they were treating the fire as arson and, on 2 February 2018, police reported that a 33-year-old woman had been arrested on suspicion of arson. In August 2019, a 34-year-old drug addict received a two-year jail sentence, having admitted to accidentally setting fire to a bin while using heroin and crack.

In February 2018, East Midlands Trains named one of their recently transferred Class 43 power cars (43467) Nottinghamshire Fire and Rescue Service and British Transport Police Nottingham after their assistance during the fire.

== Layout and facilities ==
=== Layout ===
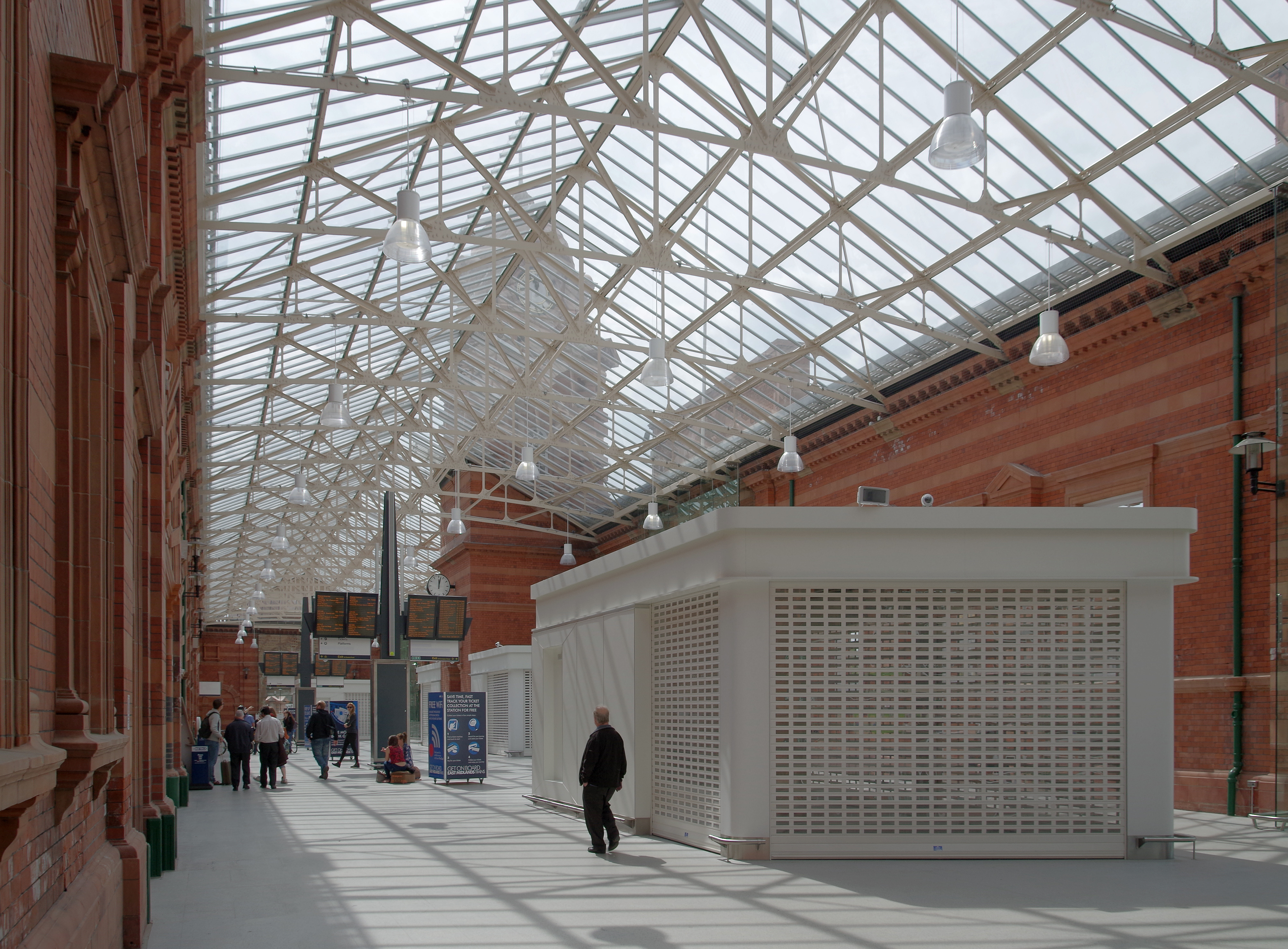
The concourse in the old porte-cochère

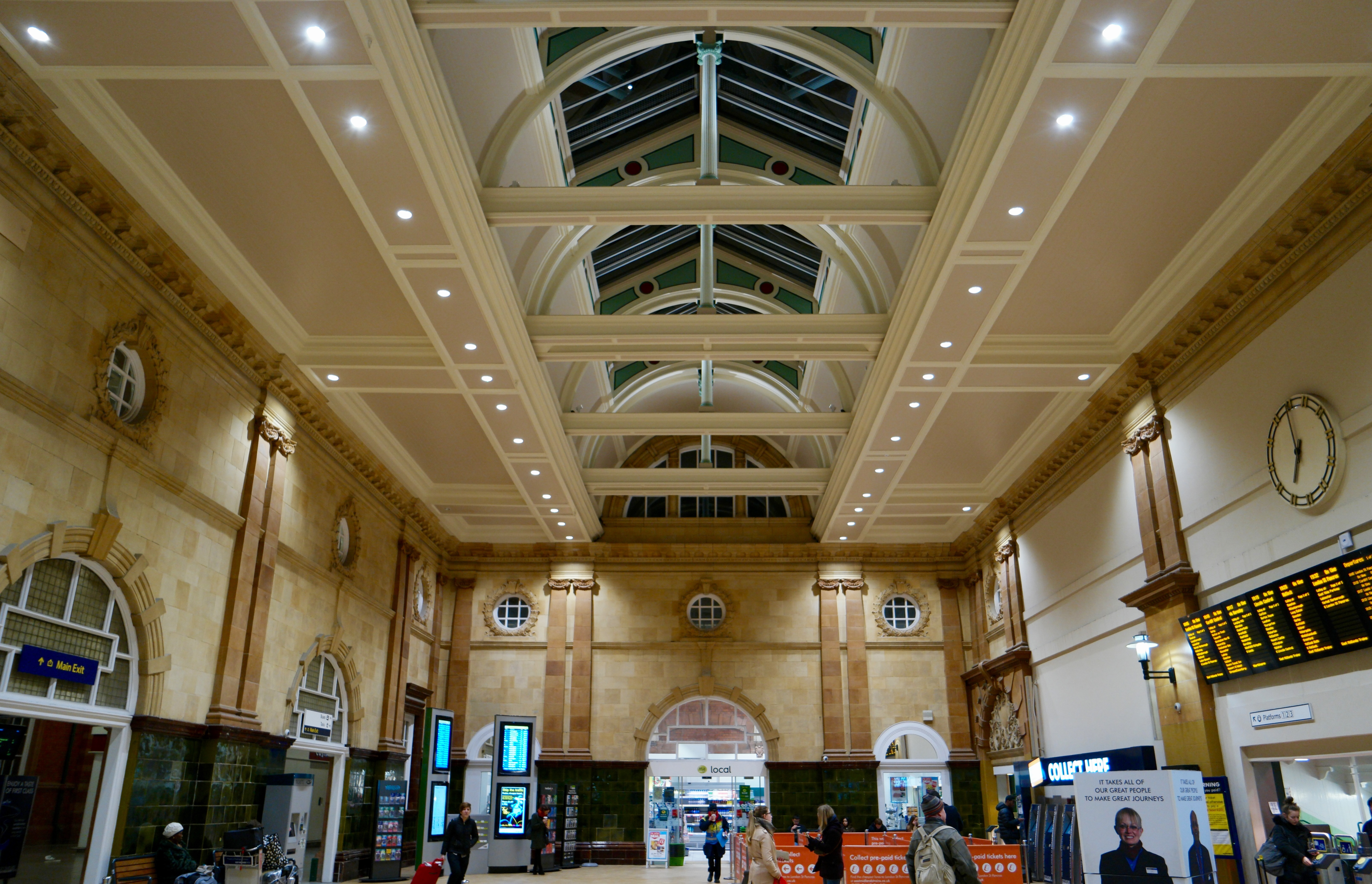
Nottingham ticket hall

The station is aligned approximately east to west, at the southern edge of the city centre, with Station Street to the north and Queen's Road to the south. At the western end of the station, the tracks are spanned by Carrington Street and the station's main entrance is on the eastern side of this street. Since the station's redevelopment, the entrances from Carrington Street open into a concourse that spans the station from north to south. This occupies what was once the station's porte-cochère and provides a large pedestrian circulation area, along with several retail sites.

The booking hall for the railway station opens off the centre of eastern side of the concourse and, in turn, gives access via ticket barriers to a pedestrian overbridge with stairs and lifts down to the railway platforms. A second concourse opens off the main concourse at the southern end of its eastern side; this runs parallel and to the south of the platforms, giving access by stairs, lifts and escalators to the tram stop, the station car park, taxi rank, vehicular pick-up and drop-off points, and Queen Street. The tram stop spans the station from north to south to the east of the main entrance, at a higher level than the concourse, and east of that a second footbridge links the platforms; it carries the previously referred-to footpath 28.

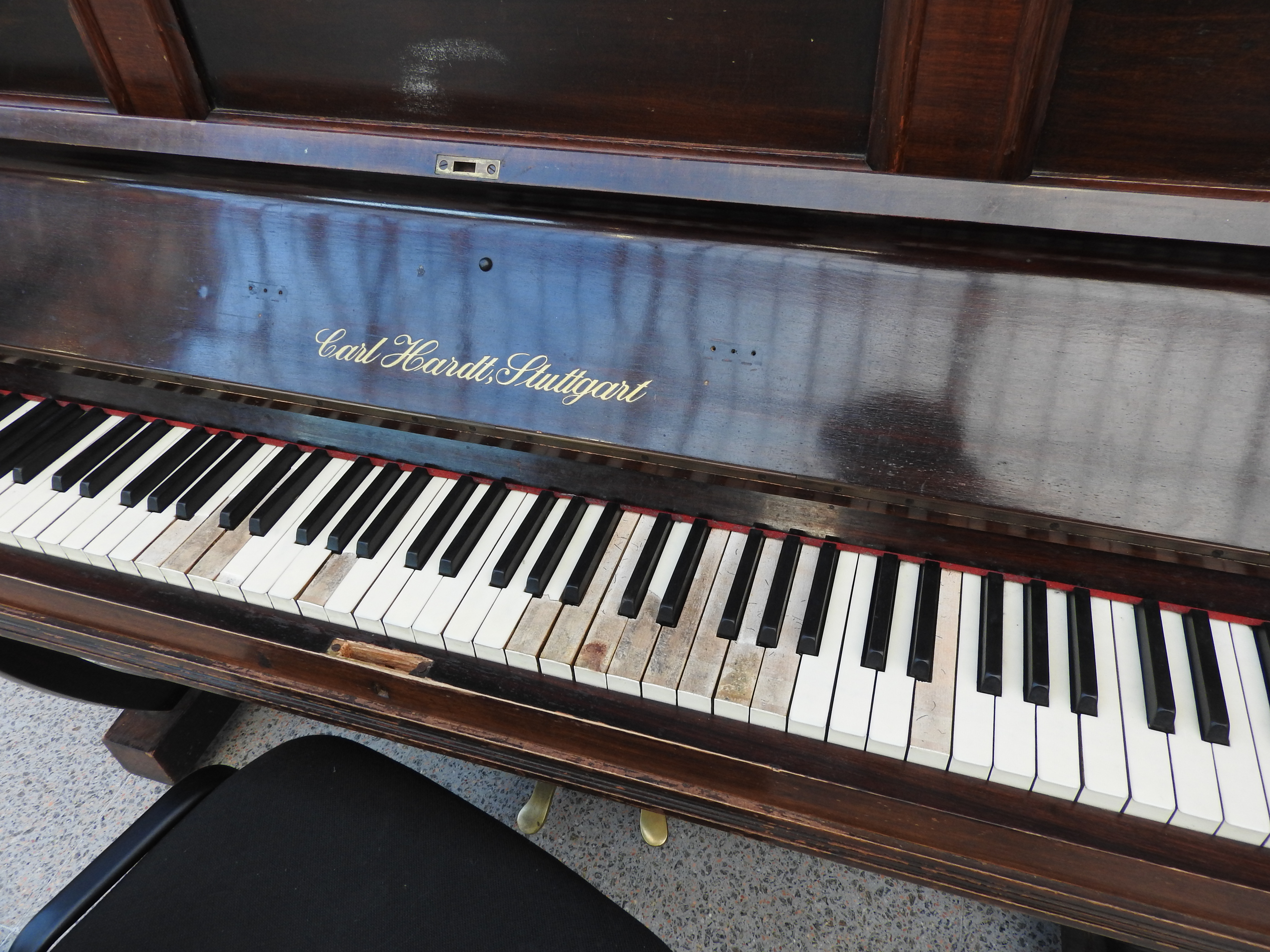
Nottingham station piano

The station's multi-storey car park lies south of the platforms, north of Queen Street, and east of the tram bridge. It provides parking for about 800 cars and the covered area below it houses the station's new taxi rank, pick-up and drop-off points, relocated from the old porte-cochère.

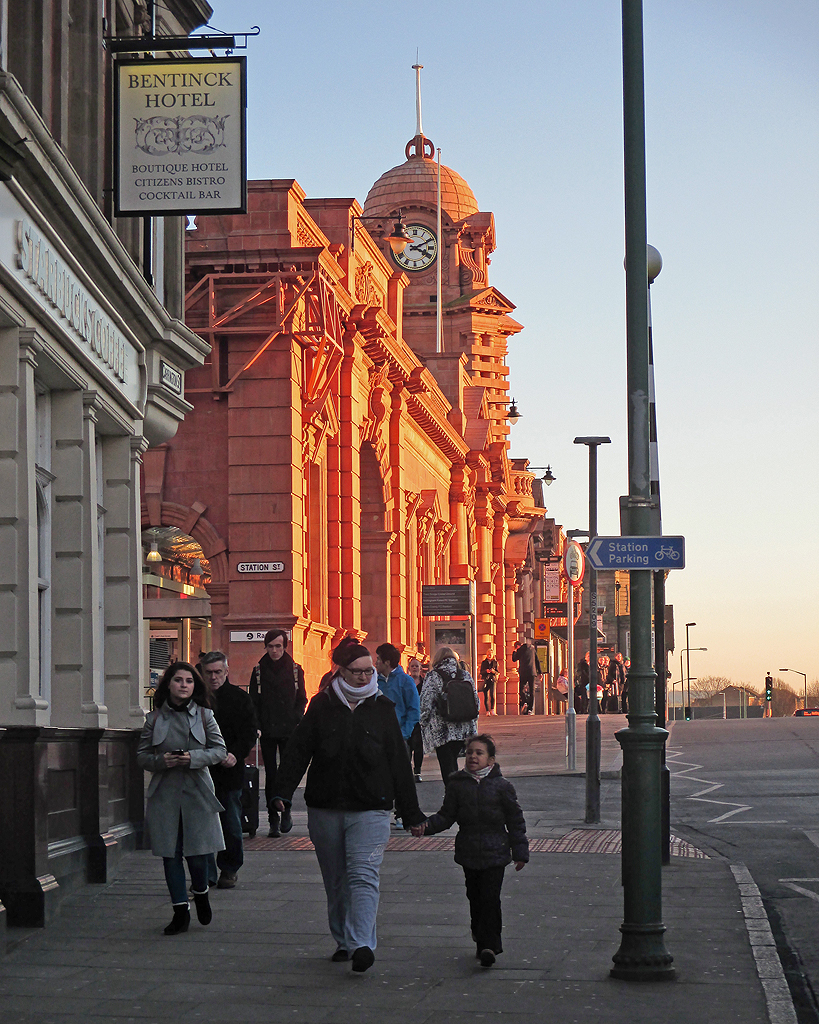
Carrington Street and Nottingham Station

=== Railway platforms ===
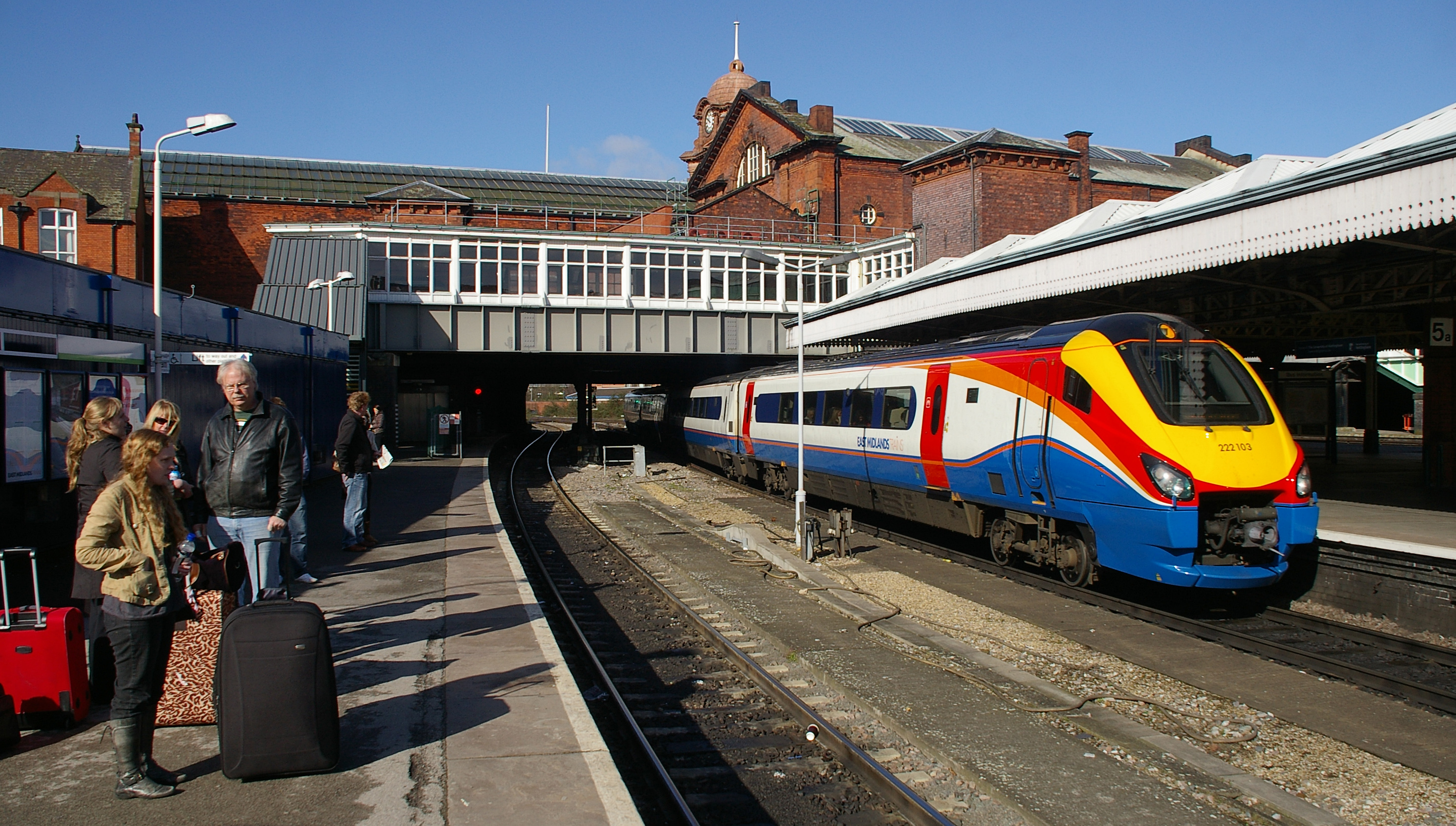
Platform 7 looking across to platform 6 (with train) and up to the concourse

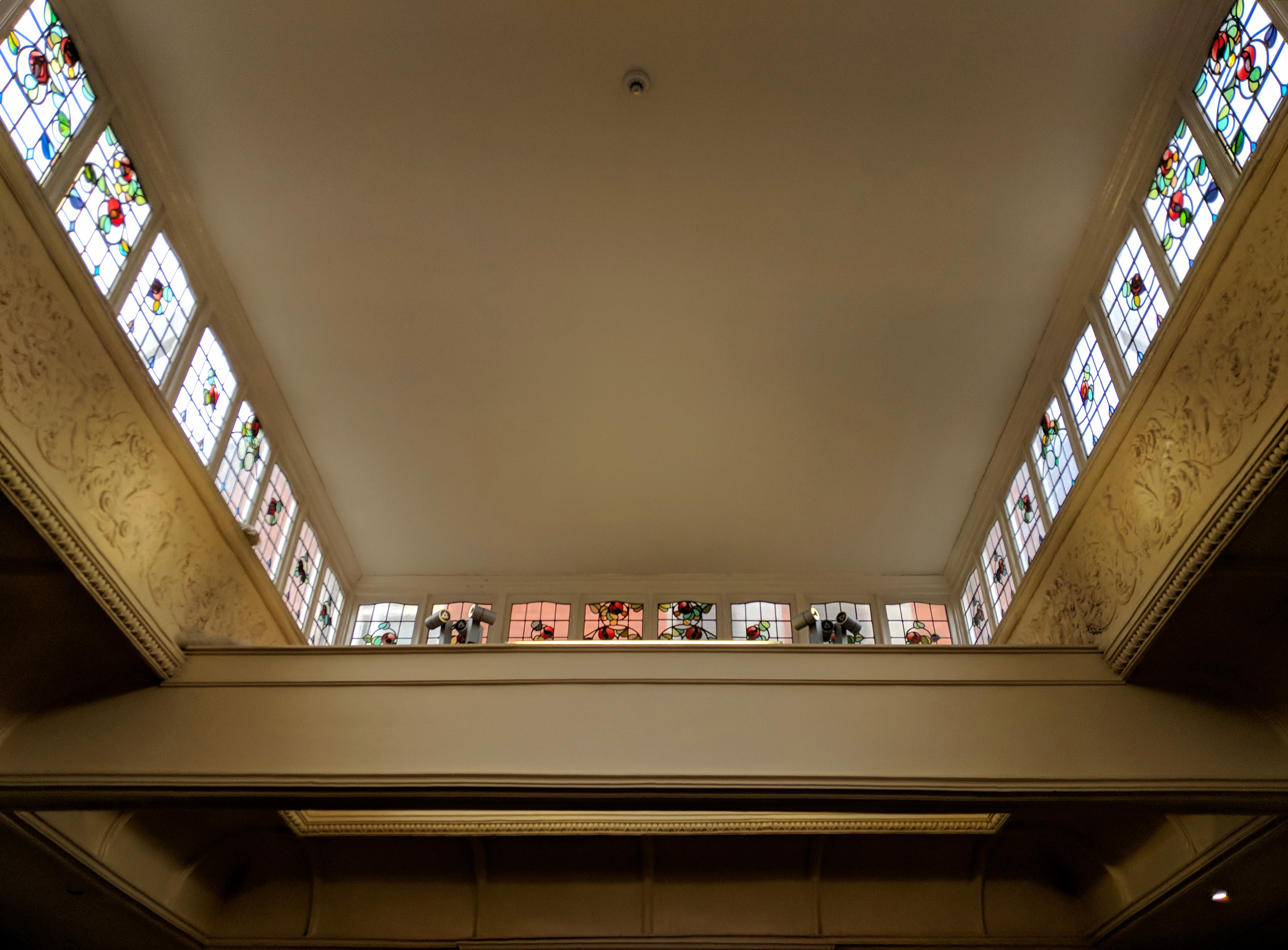
Stained-glass windows at Nottingham station

The railway platforms lie at a lower level than the station entrance and are within a ticket barrier enforced paid area. From north to south, the station has two island platforms and a single side platform, with a total of seven numbered platform faces. Each platform is linked to the main entrance concourse by stairs and lifts and to the second footbridge by stairs only.

The northern of the two island platforms has a bi-directionally signalled through platform face on each side, numbered 1 and 3, and an east-facing bay, numbered 2. The two through platforms are long enough to accommodate fifteen and fourteen-coach trains, whilst the bay can accommodate a four-coach train.

The middle island platform also is bi-directionally signalled through platform faces on each side, numbered 4 and 6, together with a west-facing terminal platform face, numbered 5. Platform 4 can accommodate a five-coach train, platform 5 a seven-coach train and platform 6 a fourteen-coach train.

The southern side platform is numbered 7 and can accommodate a thirteen-coach train. Sufficient space exists to the south of this platform to add a second platform face, effectively converting this side platform into an island platform, if traffic increases to justify it.

=== Tram stop ===
Nottingham Station
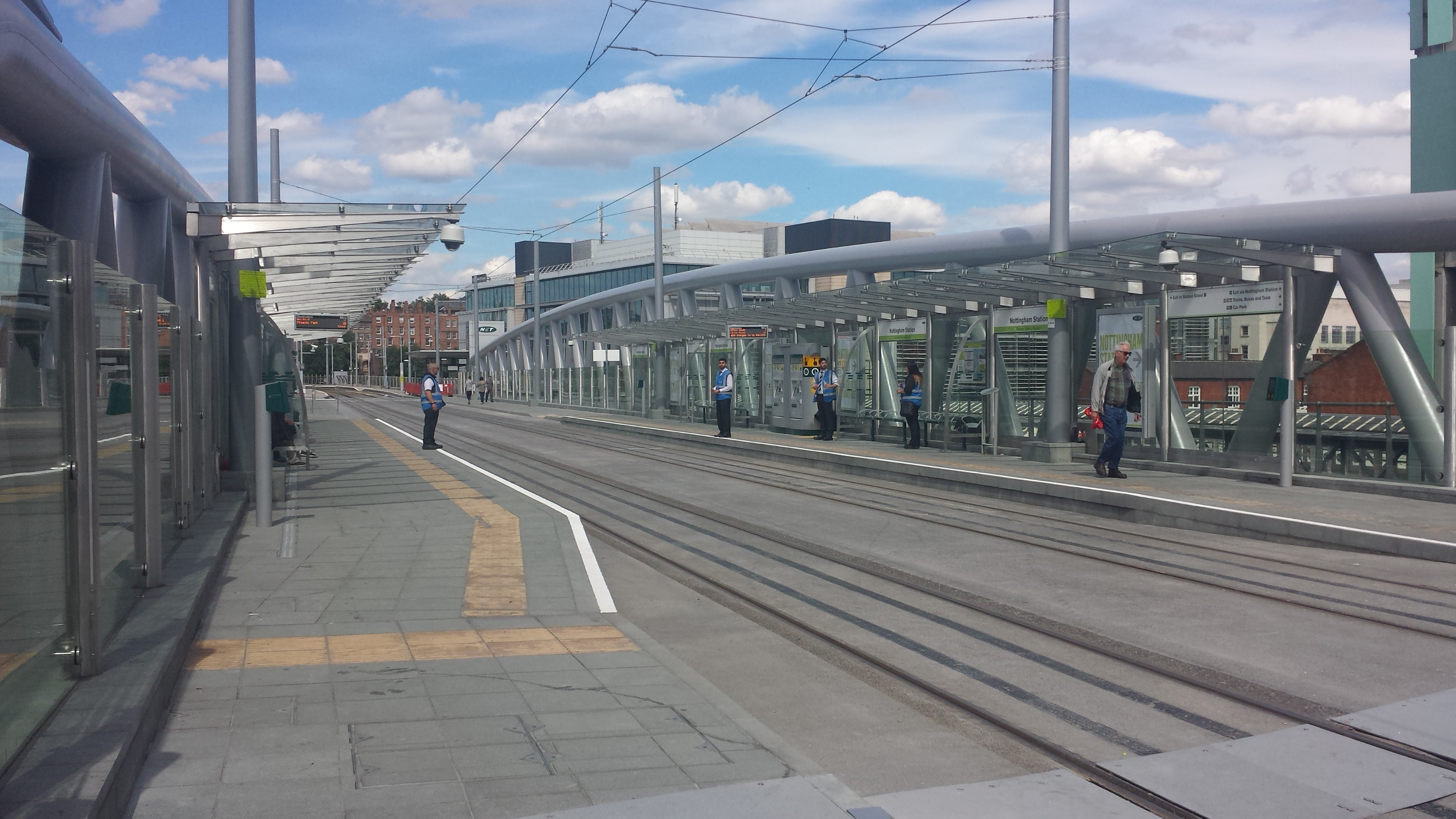

General information
- Location: Nottingham, City of Nottingham; England
- Coordinates: 52°56′49″N 1°08′44″W
- System: Nottingham Express Transit tram stop
- Owner: Nottingham Express Transit
- Operator: Nottingham Express Transit
- Line: 1 2
- Platforms: 2
- Tracks: 2

Construction
- Structure type: Viaduct
- Accessible: Step-free access to platform

Key dates
- 9 March 2004: Opened as Station Street
- 27 July 2015: Resited and renamed Nottingham Station

Services
Preceding station	NET	Following station
Lace Market towards Hucknall	Line 1	Meadows Way West towards Toton Lane
Lace Market towards Phoenix Park	Line 2	Queens Walk towards Clifton South
Location
- Location within Nottinghamshire

The new tram stop is positioned at a higher level than the station entrance and lies at a right angle to, and above, the railway platforms. It is designed as a through stop, with two side platforms flanking each side of the double tramway track. Like all NET stops, pedestrian access between the platforms is permitted on the level via crossings at each end of the platforms. Ticket machines are located on both platforms and the stop lies outside the ticket barrier-enforced paid area of the railway station.

The tram stop is connected directly to the railway station's main concourse (and the railway platforms) via the new side concourse, with stairs, escalators and lifts bridging the height difference. A direct access is also provided to the station's multi-storey car park. The former access from Station Street is also still available, accessible via a walkway running parallel to the railway tracks.

North of the stop, the tramway tracks pass over Station Street and through the abandoned platforms of the former Station Street stop, before proceeding along the old Great Central Main Line viaduct and eventually joining an on-street section through the centre of Nottingham. South of the new stop, the tracks pass over Queen's Road before descending a ramp and re-joining the city's streets at ground level. The junction between the Clifton and Chilwell branches of the NET system lies just beyond this point.

== Services ==
=== National Rail services ===
Monday to Friday off-peak service patterns as of June 2024 in trains per hour (tph) and trains per day (tpd):

East Midlands Railway:

- 2 tph to London St Pancras International (1 fast, 1 semi-fast) via Leicester and Kettering
- 1 tph to Leicester via Beeston, Loughborough and Barrow-upon-Soar (stopping)
- 1 tph to Skegness via Grantham and Boston
- 1 tph to Worksop via Hucknall and Mansfield Woodhouse
- 1 tph to Matlock via Derby and Ambergate
- 1 tph to Lincoln Central via Newark Castle, of which 1 tp2h is extended to Cleethorpes via Market Rasen and Grimsby Town
- 1 tph to Crewe via Derby and Stoke-on-Trent
- 1 tph to Lincoln Central via Newark Castle and Lowdham (stopping)
- 1 tph to Liverpool Lime Street via Sheffield, Manchester Piccadilly and Warrington Central
- 1 tph to Norwich via Grantham, Peterborough and Ely

CrossCountry:

- 1 tph to Birmingham New Street via Derby
- 1 tph to Cardiff Central via Derby, Birmingham New Street and Gloucester

Northern:

- 1 tph to Leeds via Sheffield, Barnsley and Wakefield Kirkgate

Preceding station	National Rail	Following station
Derby	CrossCountry Birmingham–Nottingham	Terminus
Beeston	CrossCountry Cardiff–Nottingham	Terminus
Beeston	CrossCountry Nottingham–Bournemouth (Limited service, southbound only)	Terminus
Leicester	East Midlands Railway Midland Main Line	Terminus
Beeston	East Midlands Railway Midland Main Line	Lowdham Limited Service
Loughborough	East Midlands Railway Leicester–Lincoln/Grimsby/Cleethorpes	Newark Castle
Beeston	East Midlands Railway Leicester–Lincoln/Grimsby/Cleethorpes	Newark Castle
Attenborough	East Midlands Railway Leicester–Lincoln/Grimsby/Cleethorpes	Newark Castle
Ilkeston Limited Service	East Midlands Railway Liverpool–Norwich	Grantham
Ilkeston Limited Service	East Midlands Railway Liverpool–Norwich	Loughborough Limited Service
Terminus	East Midlands Railway Nottingham–Skegness	Netherfield Limited Service
Terminus	East Midlands Railway Nottingham–Skegness	Radcliffe Limited Service
Terminus	East Midlands Railway Nottingham–Skegness	Bingham
Bulwell	East Midlands Railway Robin Hood Line	Terminus
Hucknall	East Midlands Railway Robin Hood Line	Terminus
Beeston	East Midlands Railway Crewe-Lincoln	Carlton
Ilkeston	Northern Trains Nottingham-Leeds	Terminus

=== Nottingham Express Transit services ===
Nottingham station is on the common section of the NET, where line 1, between Hucknall and Toton Lane, and line 2, between Phoenix Park and Clifton South, operate together. The two branches to Toton Lane and Clifton South split to the south of the station, while sharing track to the north into the city centre. Trams on each line run at a frequency of between four and eight trams per hour, depending on the day and time of day, combining to provide up to 16 trams per hour on the common section.

Preceding station	NET	Following station
Lace Market towards Hucknall	Line 1	Meadows Way West towards Toton Lane
Lace Market towards Phoenix Park	Line 2	Queens Walk towards Clifton South

== See also ==
- Nottingham Victoria railway station (1890 to 1967)
- Nottingham Carrington Street railway station (1839 to 1848)
- Carrington railway station (1899 to 1928)
- Grade II* listed buildings in Nottinghamshire
- Listed buildings in Nottingham (Bridge ward)
