= Rugby Central railway station =

Former railway station in Warwickshire, England

Rugby Central
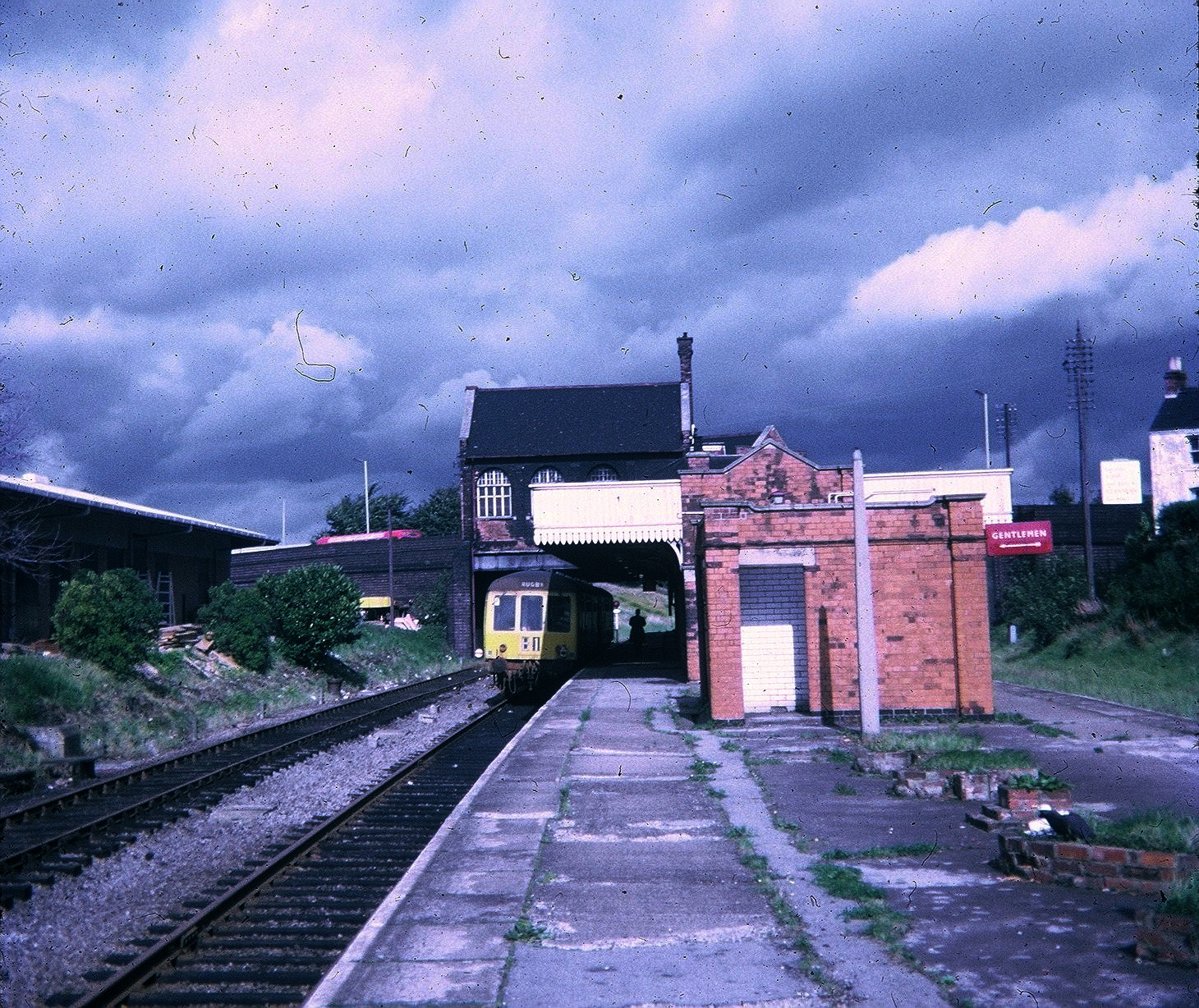
- The station in September 1968, less than a year before closure. A Nottingham-bound diesel multiple unit waits at the platform

General information
- Location: Rugby, Borough of Rugby, England
- Coordinates: 52.3673°N 1.2471°W
- Grid reference: SP513746
- Platforms: 2

Other information
- Status: Disused

History
- Original company: Great Central Railway
- Pre-grouping: Great Central Railway
- Post-grouping: London and North Eastern Railway, London Midland Region of British Railways

Key dates
- 15 March 1899: Opened
- 5 May 1969: Closed
Location

Rugby Central was a railway station serving the town of Rugby, in Warwickshire, England. It was a stop on the former Great Central Main Line, which opened in 1899 and closed in 1969. The station was on Hillmorton Road, roughly half a mile east of the town centre.

The Great Central competed with the West Coast Main Line for traffic to London, which has served the town since the 1830s at Rugby Midland station; since the closure of Rugby Central, Midland station has reverted to its original name of Rugby.

== History ==
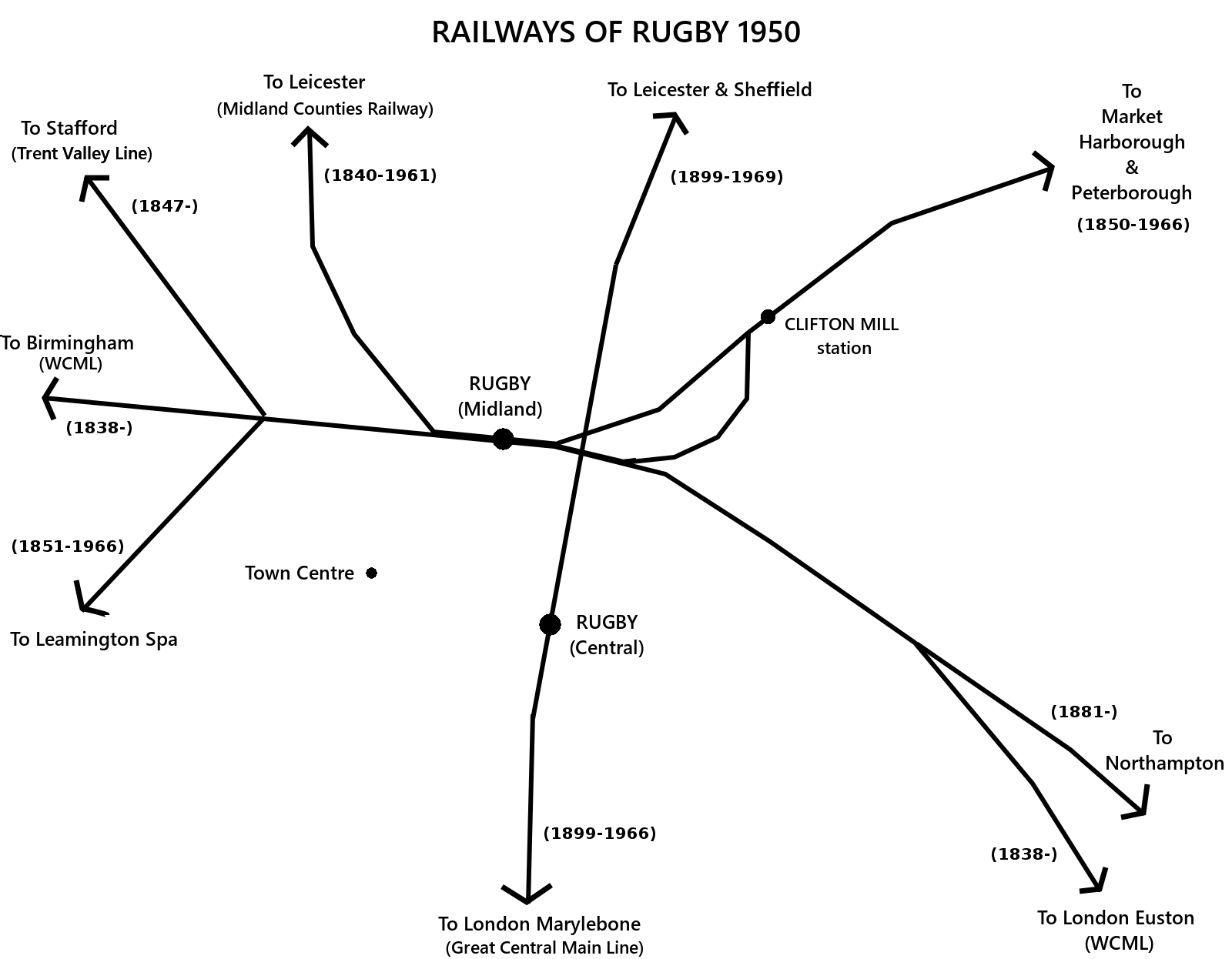
A map of railways in Rugby in 1950

The station was opened on 15 March 1899. It had services between London Marylebone and Manchester London Road, via Leicester Central, Nottingham Victoria and Sheffield Victoria; it also hosted various cross-country services to places such as Southampton and Hull.

The station was run by the Great Central Railway from 1899, until it was grouped into the London and North Eastern Railway in 1923. It came under the management of British Railways in 1948.

Rugby Central was roughly midway along the Great Central Main Line (GCML) and was a stopping point for express services, as well as a changeover point for local services. Until the early 1960s, the station was served by about six London–Manchester expresses daily; it was the terminus for local services from Aylesbury or Woodford Halse to the south, and Leicester Central or Nottingham Victoria from the north. The line was then downgraded, with express services being removed, leaving only the local services and an infrequent semi-fast service to London.

Most of the GCML was closed on 5 September 1966, following the recommendations of the Reshaping of British Railways report. On that date, the line south of Rugby Central and north of Nottingham Victoria was closed. Until 3 May 1969, the section between Rugby Central and Nottingham (initially Nottingham Victoria, later cut back to Nottingham Arkwright Street) remained open as self-contained branch, providing diesel multiple unit-operated local passenger services. The station formally closed on 5 May and the station buildings were demolished.

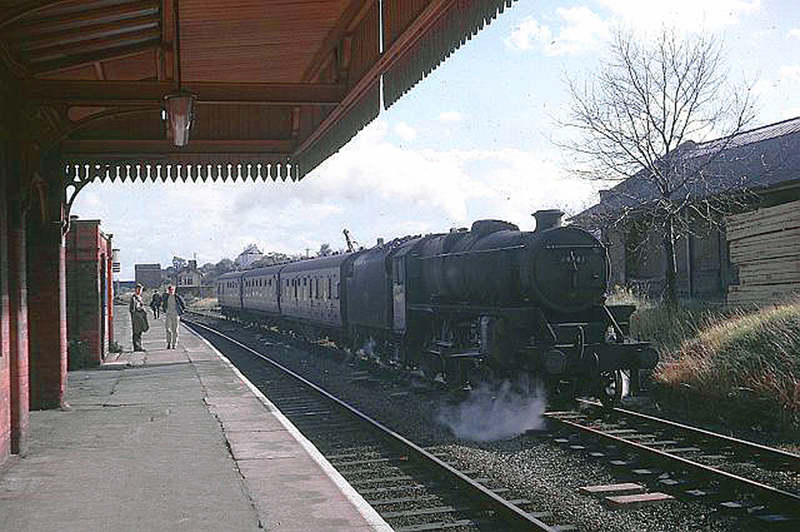
A local train waits to stop at Rugby Central in September 1966, shortly before the line was closed as a through route.

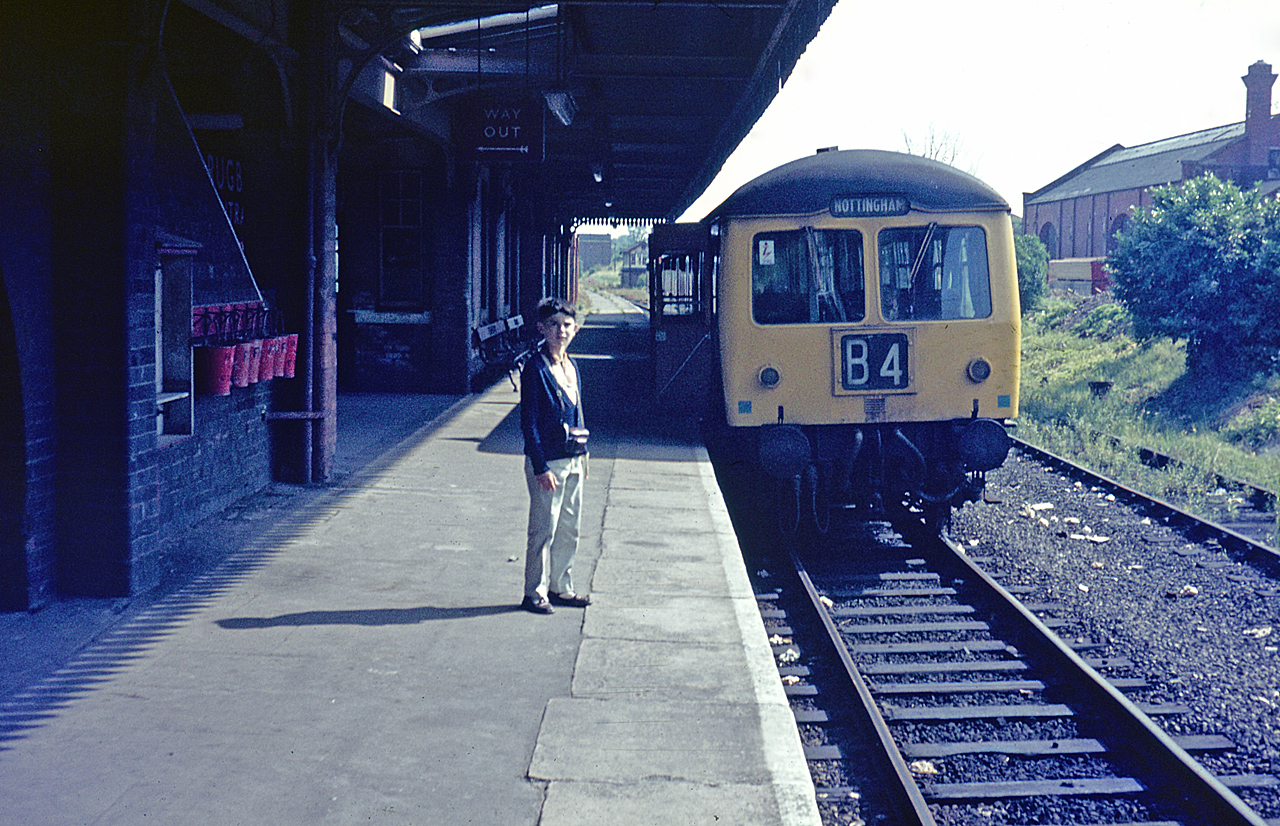
A Nottingham-bound DMU at Rugby Central in 1968

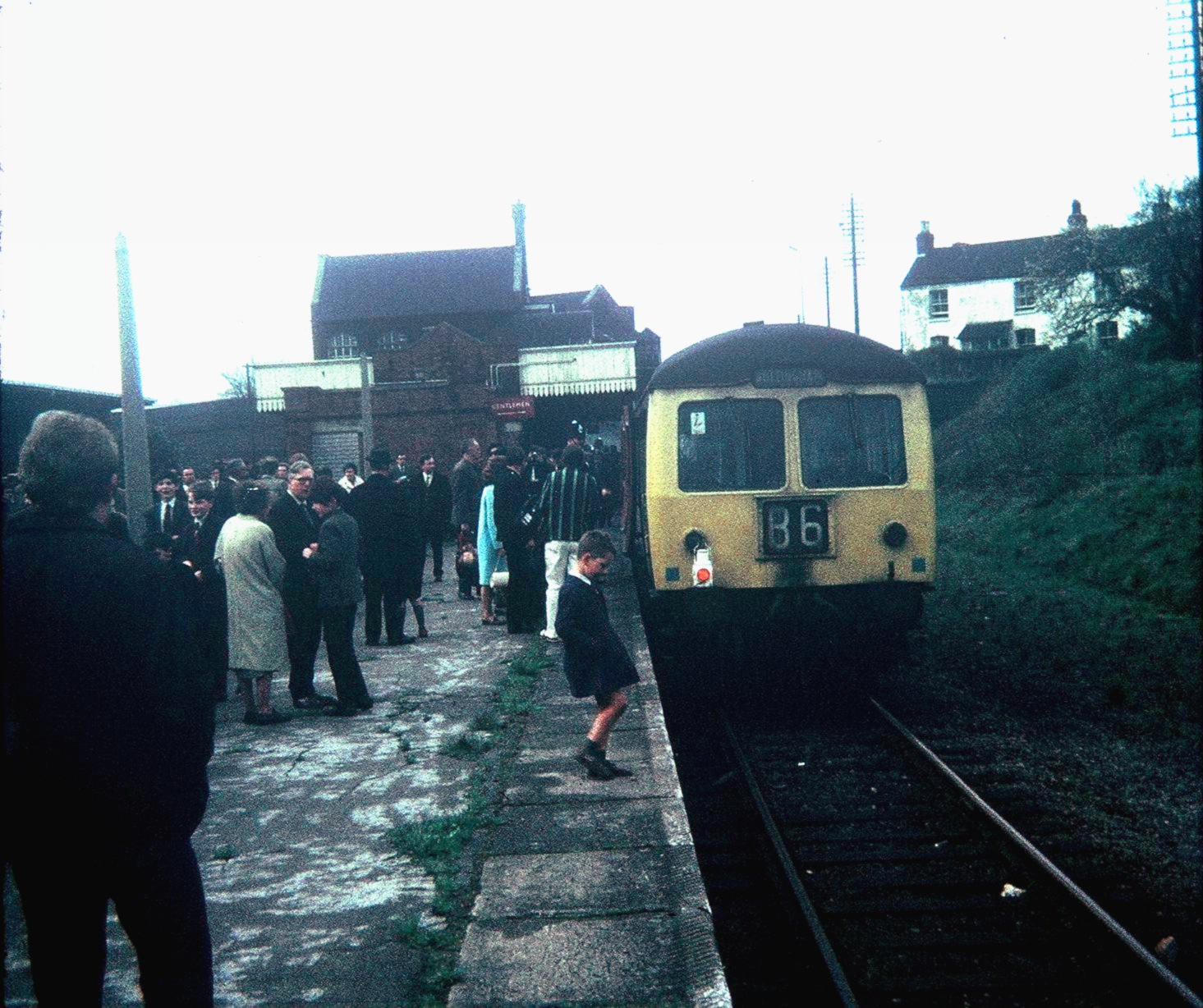
The last train to call at Rugby Central on Saturday 3 May 1969.

Preceding station	Disused railways	Following station
Braunston and Willoughby; Line and station closed	Great Central Railway; London Extension	Lutterworth; Line and station closed

== Design ==
Rugby Central was built to the standard Great Central design with a single island platform, 600 feet (180 m) long. The booking office was at street level, built onto the side of the road bridge over the railway with the platform below. The platform was accessed by a covered staircase from the booking office. On the platform were three waiting rooms and a toilet block, which was the only building not covered by the canopy.

On the heritage Great Central Railway in Leicestershire, the preserved Loughborough Central station is a similar design to the former Rugby Central.

== The site today ==
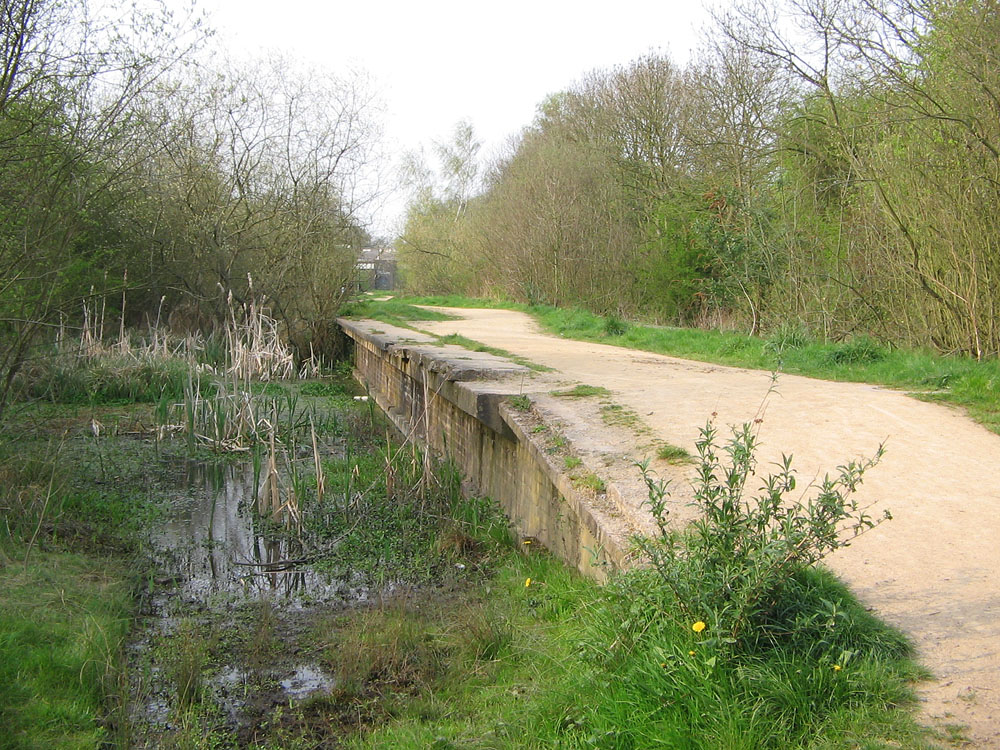
The remains of the south end of the platform looking north

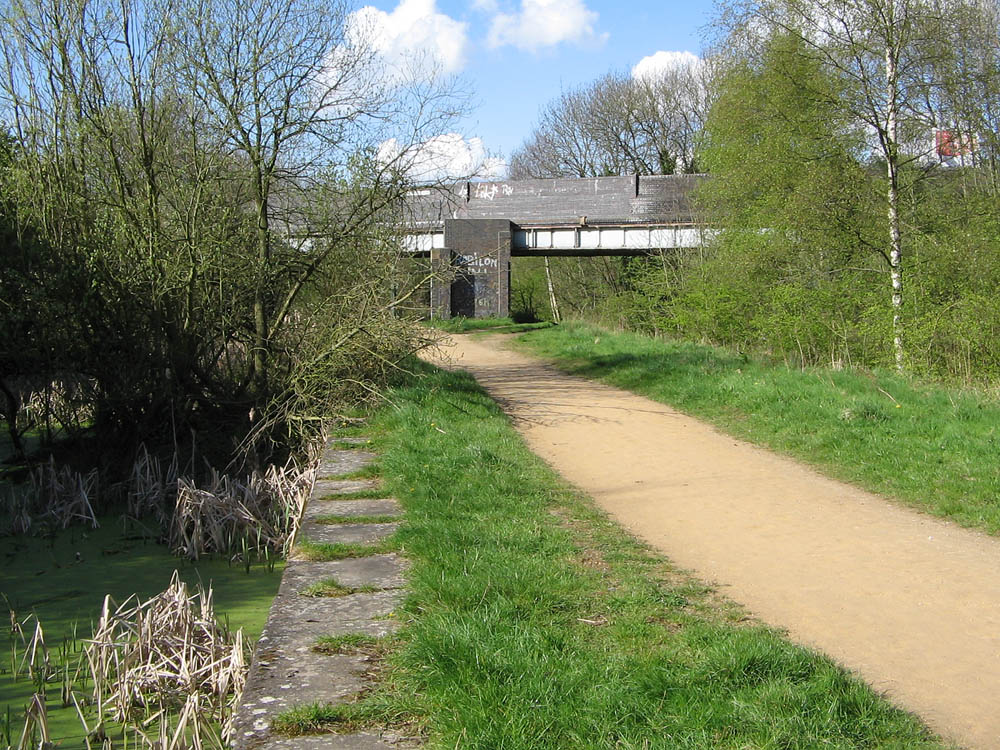
A view taken from old platform towards road bridge

The platform is extant and is accessible to the public. The station site, and 4.5 miles of the former Great Central Railway trackbed through Rugby, are now owned by Rugby Borough Council, which bought them in 1970 for £5,500. The trackbed runs mostly through cuttings and it is now used as a footpath, cycleway and nature reserve called the Great Central Walk.

The former goods yard was west of the station and was used as a timber yard until the mid-1990s, when houses were built on it.

== Reopening proposals ==
In August 2000, Chiltern Railways suggested reopening the former Great Central Main Line between London Marylebone and Rugby Central to a parkway station in Leicestershire, near to the M1/M6. The proposal is a "secondary aspiration" of Chiltern's franchise agreement. However, Chiltern stated in 2013 that the plan is "no longer active".

In recent years, proposals to reopen the railway line as an alternative route to HS2 have been proposed and, in 2015, opponents of HS2 called for the GCR to be reopened as an alternative.

In October 2017, English Regional Transport Association proposed reopening the line from Calvert to Rugby with a new link to Nuneaton, as part of a West Coast relief line.
