= Nottingham Victoria railway station =

Former railway station in Nottinghamshire, England

Coordinates: 52.9572°N 1.1477°W

Nottingham Victoria
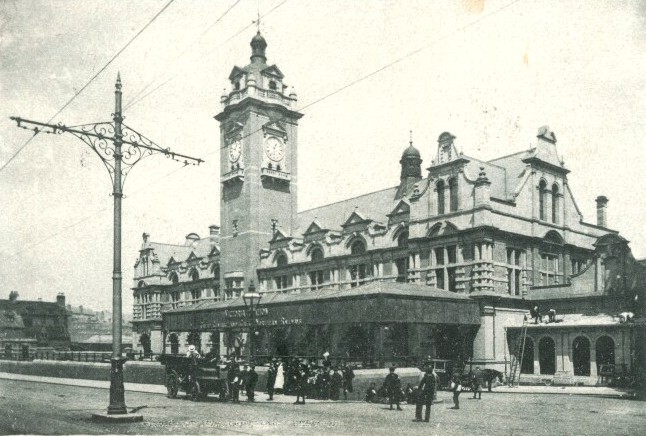
- The station in 1903

General information
- Location: Nottingham, City of Nottingham, England
- Grid reference: SK573403
- Platforms: 12

Other information
- Status: Disused

History
- Original company: Great Central Railway and Great Northern Railway
- Pre-grouping: Great Central Railway and Great Northern Railway
- Post-grouping: London and North Eastern Railway, British Railways (London Midland Region)

Key dates
- 24 May 1900: Opened
- 4 September 1967: Closed
Location

Nottingham Victoria was a Great Central Railway and Great Northern Railway railway station in Nottingham, Nottinghamshire, England. It was designed by the architect Albert Edward Lambert, who also designed the rebuild of Nottingham Midland station.

It was opened by the Nottingham Joint Station Committee on 24 May 1900 and closed on 4 September 1967 by the London Midland Region of British Railways. The station building was entirely demolished, except for the clock tower; the Victoria Centre shopping centre was built on the site, incorporating the old station clock tower into the main entrance on Milton Street (the continuation of Mansfield Road).

== Background ==
In 1893, the Manchester, Sheffield and Lincolnshire Railway obtained authorisation to extend its North Midlands railway network into London. This new line was opened on 15 March 1899, by which time the railway company was known as the Great Central Railway; it became known as the London Extension, stretching from Annesley to a new station at Marylebone in London. The line passed through Nottingham, where a new station was to be built.

== Construction and opening ==
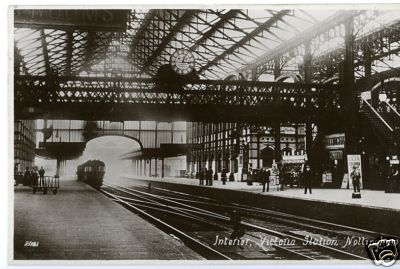
Station interior in the years after opening

The station's construction was on a grand scale: a 13-acre (53,000 m^{2}) site was acquired at a cost of £473,000 (£53.2 million) in the heart of Nottingham's city centre; negotiations for the land acquisition had taken three years. The construction called for the demolition of whole streets of some 1,300 houses, 24 public houses, and St. Stephen's Church, Bunker's Hill, following which about 600,000 cubic yards (460,000 m^{3}) of sandstone was excavated from the site. The site measured about 650 yards (590 m) in length from north to south and had an average width of 110 yards (100 m), with a tunnel at each end for access.

The Great Central Railway and Great Northern Railway shared the station; they split into two lines at Weekday Cross junction. The two owners failed to reach agreement on the station's name; the Great Central naturally wanted it called "Central", a proposition the Great Northern, still smarting from the incursion into its territory made by the London Extension, would not accept. The two railway companies operated separate booking offices, the Great Central issuing tickets reading Nottingham Central, whilst the Great Northern's window bore the name "Nottingham Joint St'n". In the 1898 Royal Atlas of England, the station was recorded as the "Grt Central & Grt Northern Joint Central Station". The town clerk resolved the situation by suggesting the name "Nottingham Victoria" to reflect the fact that the planned opening date coincided with Queen Victoria's birthday; this was readily accepted at a meeting of the Nottingham Joint Station Committee on 12 June.

Nottingham Victoria station was officially opened without ceremony in the early hours of 24 May 1900, over a year after the commencement of services on the new railway line. The first service to call at the station was a Great Central express from Manchester London Road to London Marylebone, which pulled in at 1:12 a.m.; it was followed fifteen minutes later by a Great Central express travelling in the opposite direction.

== Station building ==
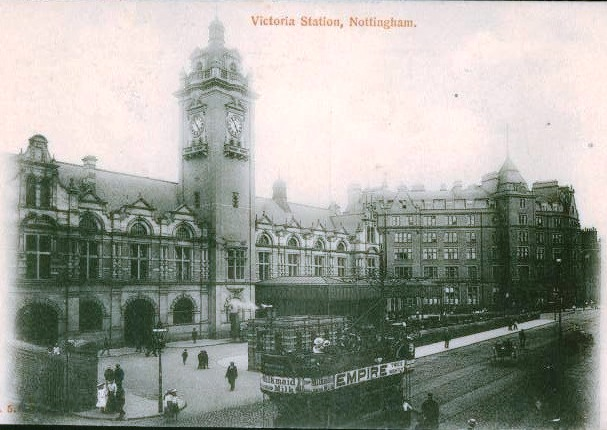
The station in the early 1900s; on the right of the picture is the Victoria Hotel, now a Hilton hotel.

The main station building was in true Victorian splendour. It was constructed in a Renaissance style using the best-quality red-faced bricks and Darley Dale stone, with space at the front for Hackney carriages, which was covered by a canopy. It faced onto the confluence of Mansfield Road and Milton Street for some 250 feet (76 m).

The three-storey building was dominated by a 100-foot (30 m) clock tower topped with a cupola and weather vane. At the north end of the building, access could be gained to the parcels office via two large metal gates. Once inside the building on the ground floor level, one reached the large and lofty booking hall. It was over 100 feet (30 m) long and 66 feet (20 m) wide, and contained the best-quality pine and a hard-wearing oak floor, along with a gallery on each side to gain access to spacious offices on the first floor. The booking hall contained seven ticket-issuing windows, three each for the Great Central and Great Northern and one for excursion traffic; a clock-type train indicator served all platforms. An iron overbridge led from the booking hall and spanned the platforms, to which it was connected by four broad staircases. A small footbridge at the end provided access to the island platforms at the south end, themselves connected to a side exit leading onto Parliament Street.

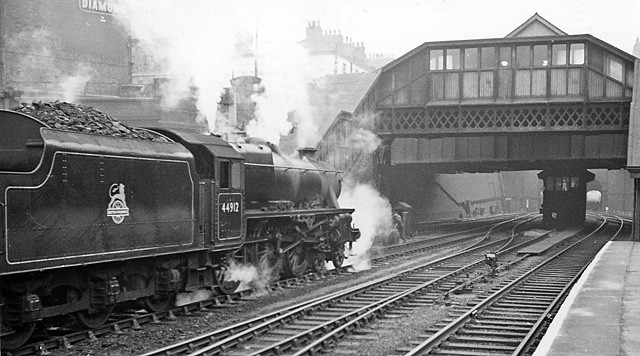
The station in 1959

The station itself comprised two large island platforms, each between 1,250 feet (380 m) and 1,270 feet (390 m) long, with two bays at each end for local traffic, giving a total of 12 platform faces. On each island platform were dining and tea rooms together with kitchens, sleeping facilities for staff, waiting rooms and lavatories. All these buildings were, like the rest of the station, lined with glazed tiles, which were generally buff in colour and embellished with a chocolate dado. Large 42 feet 6 inches (12.95 m) steel pillars held up an enormous three-part glazed canopy measuring 450 feet (140 m) in length, with a centre span of 83 feet 3 inches (25.37 m) and a pair of flanking spans each of 63 feet 9 inches (19.43 m). There were additional glass roofs over the double-bay platforms, each carried on central pillars. An electrically lit subway system, below track level and covering the breadth of the station, could be used for transporting luggage, thereby avoiding the need to carry it over the footbridges. The subway was linked to the main station by four lifts serving respectively the booking hall, cloakroom and two island platforms. The refreshment rooms had their own underground subway and lifts.

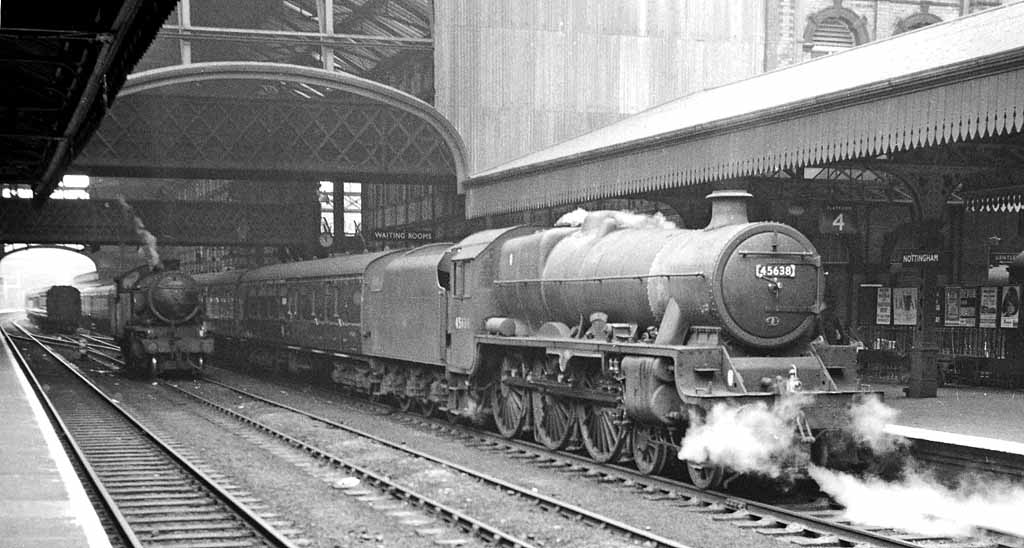
LMS 'Jubilee' 6P 4-6-0 No. 45638 Zanzibar in 1962

The station had passing loops round all platforms (for freight), two signal boxes, and two turntables. The two signal boxes were positioned at the north and south ends of the station and controlled entry and exit to the tunnels that allowed entry to the complex.

== Station masters ==
- William Thompson 1900 - 1903 (formerly station master at Malton)
- Arthur Blanden 1903 - 1911 (later station superintendent at Marylebone)
- Charles James Fox 1911 - 1926
- Herbert Montagu Budds 1926 - 1936
- Walter Wainwright Capon 1936 - 1941 (formerly station master at Basford and Bulwell, later station master at Sheffield Victoria)
- Robert Barlow Stoakley 1941 - 1952 (formerly station master at Cleethorpes)
- C.E. Jolly until 1956
- Eric H. Handley from 1959 (formerly station master at Peterborough East)

== Services ==
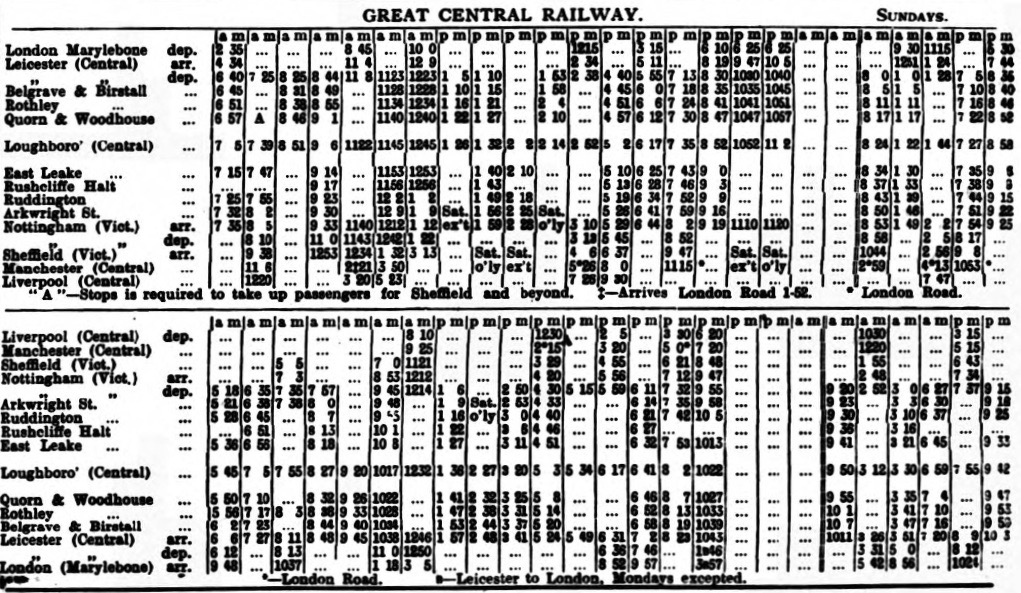
Timetable of main line services to and from London Marylebone for July 1919, as published in the Loughborough Echo on 18 July 1919

The traffic that passed through was varied. It included London–Manchester expresses, local services, cross-country services (e.g. from York to Bristol, via Oxford) as well as freight workings. As the station was shared with the Great Northern Railway, which was already well established when Victoria opened, a large network of lines serving many destinations was available from the one station. The new services offered unbeatable competition to the Midland Railway services from Nottingham Midland station. The Midland offered more trains per day to Leicester, but the journey time of 40 minutes was outclassed by the Great Central's journey time of 27 minutes non-stop. The journey time to Sheffield was similarly impressive at 50 minutes.

In 1905, there were nine goods trains to London each day, the fastest taking only 2 hours 15 minutes.

Preceding station	Disused railways	Following station
Arkwright Street; Line and station closed	Great Central Railway; London Extension	Carrington; Line and station closed
Terminus	Great Northern Railway; Nottingham to Stafford; Nottingham to Pinxton	Carrington; Line and station closed
Nottingham London Road; High Level; Line and station closed	Great Northern Railway; Nottingham to Grantham; Nottingham to Newark; Nottingham to Shirebrook; Nottingham to Basford & Bulwell; Nottingham Suburban	Terminus

== Decline ==
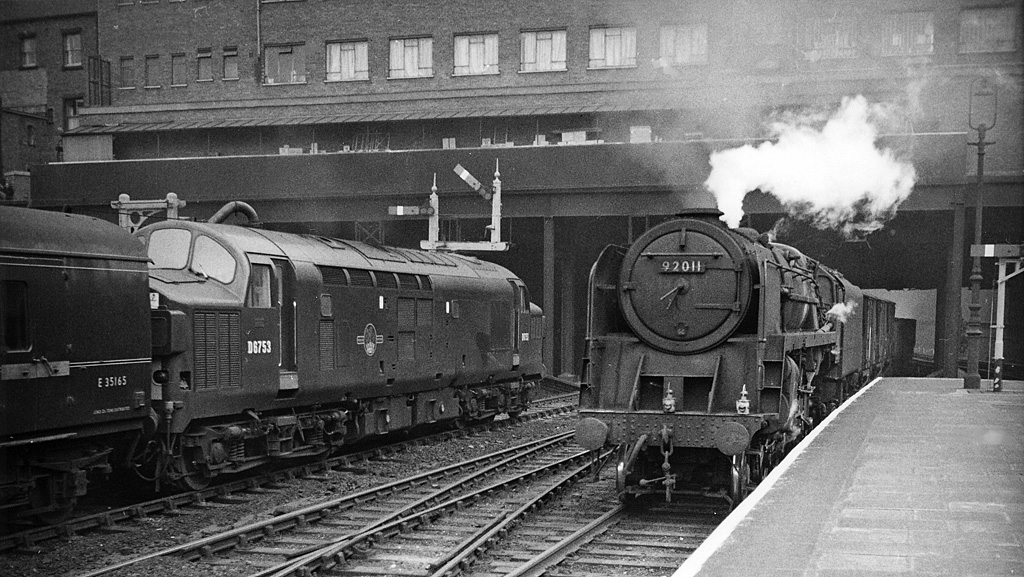
Down freight and Up express in 1962

During the 1960s, the whole Great Central route was run down by diverting services away from it, cutting others, and slowing down expresses to very slack timetables. Locomotives and rolling stock were old and unreliable, and the line did not benefit from British Rail's new diesel locomotives. As passenger numbers fell, going either by car or by other lines, closure seemed inevitable. The last through service from Nottingham Victoria to London ran on 3 September 1966 at 17:15, hauled by a LMS Stanier Class 5 4-6-0, No. 44984. All that was left was a diesel multiple unit service between Nottingham and Rugby Central, the Victoria to Grantham services having been rerouted to Nottingham Midland on 3 July 1967.

Victoria station was finally closed on 4 September 1967 and was demolished, amidst much opposition, leaving only the clocktower to survive amongst the new Victoria Shopping Centre and flats. The station site was bought by Capital and Counties Property Company Limited from British Rail, with a plan to spend £7.5m on the first stage of development. This was reportedly the largest commercial development in Britain ever carried out by a private developer outside of the London area. Goods trains continued to pass through the site of Victoria until May 1968, with two running lines left in place amidst the demolition of the main station.

== Present day ==
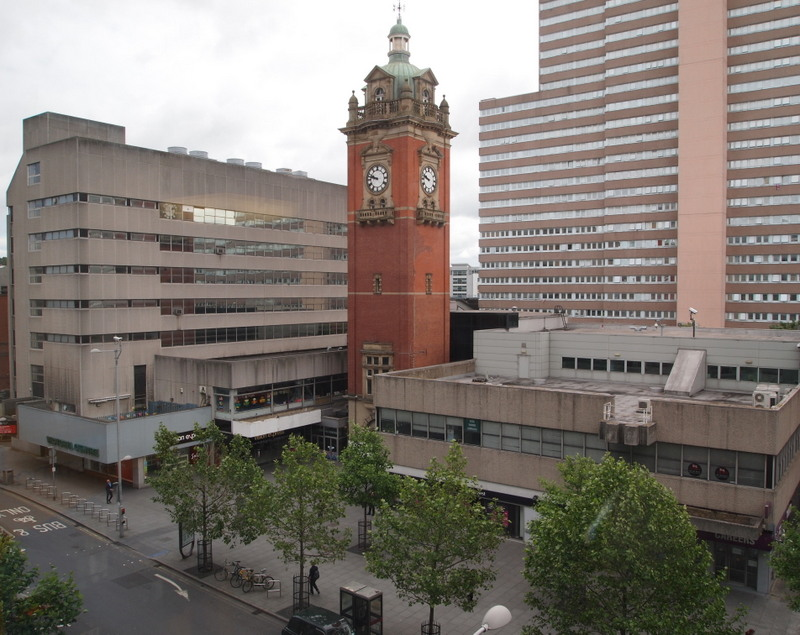
The station site in 2012. The clock tower is all that remains of Nottingham Victoria station, surrounded by the 1967 Victoria shopping centre.

The site is now occupied by the Victoria Shopping Centre and housing in the form of Victoria Flats, Nottingham's tallest building (256 feet / 72m tall). The new structure incorporates the original station's clock tower. From the bottom level of the shopping centre's car park, in the former station's deep cutting, the entrance of Mansfield Road railway tunnel remains visible.

Upon the closure of the Great Central railway and the Great Northern/London and North Western Joint line to Melton Mowbray (via Barnstone), Nottingham also lost other important stations: Nottingham London Road High Level and Nottingham London Road Low Level.

The city's other main line station, Nottingham Midland, remains in service.

Redevelopment plans for the Victoria Shopping Centre announced in 2011 by Intu would have seen an extension built northwards, filling in the last section of the former station's deep cutting and concealing the entrance to the Mansfield Road Tunnel.

== See also ==
- Nottingham railway station (1848–present)
- Nottingham Carrington Street railway station (1840 to 1948)
- Carrington railway station (1899 to 1928)
