= Nottingham Joint Station Committee =

Former railway committee of Great Britain

The Nottingham Joint Station Committee was incorporated by the Great Northern Railway Act 1897 (60 & 61 Vict. c. xl) to manage the railway station which was to become Nottingham Victoria. The committee comprised representatives of the two railway companies to use the station: the Great Northern and the Great Central.

The committee was no longer required when both companies were grouped (with others) on 1 January 1923 to form the London and North Eastern Railway Company.
