= Nottingham Carrington Street railway station =

Former railway station in Nottingham, England

Coordinates: 52.9476°N 1.1480°W

Nottingham Carrington Street
- Original station at Nottingham Carrington Street.

General information
- Location: Nottingham, Nottingham; England
- Platforms: ?

Other information
- Status: Disused

History
- Original company: Midland Counties Railway
- Pre-grouping: Midland Railway

Key dates
- 30 May 1839: Opened (Note: Although the opening ceremony took place on this date and three special trains departed the station, normal passenger services did not begin until 4 May.)
- 22 May 1848: Closed
Location

Nottingham Carrington Street railway station was the first railway station in Nottingham, opened in 1839 by the Midland Counties Railway. Initially there were two lines with a central platform as well as side ones according to Billson.

Victorian civil engineer Francis Whishaw described the station as:

"The elevation next to the road to Nottingham is of plain but neat design. It consists of a central portion and two wings; the central portion contains the entrance hall, which is of the whole height of the building. In the right wing is the booking office for first and second class passengers, with windows (looking to the hall) at which the passengers receive their tickets; the third class passengers obtain their tickets at a counter fixed in the hall. In the left-wing is the boardroom and clerks offices; and in a building projecting towards the passenger shed in the rear is a waiting room for ladies. The [train] shed is covered with a light iron roof in two spans, which is supported on the departure side by a brick wall, in which there are eight windows; and on the arrival side, and along the middle line, by two rows of cast iron columns, nine in each row."

However, Whishaw in 1842 writes the station had grown to four lines. As was usual in those days there were "as many turntables without the shed; the cross line intersecting which communicates with the carriage wharf or landing, which is on the arrival side". This arrangement would probably be similar to that at Derby, allowing coaches to be manhandled between tracks to form trains. On the north side the station was next to the canal and a small warehouse allowed for transshipment of cargoes between the canal and railway. The original gateposts to the yard and the bridge under the towpath still survive.

The first member of the British Royal Family to travel by train was Dowager Queen Adelaide who took a train provided by the Midland Counties Railway from Nottingham to Derby, where another train provided by the North Midland Railway transported Her Majesty to Leeds on 22 July 1840.

In view of plans by the Midland Railway, as it had become, to extend the line to Lincoln two extra lines with platforms were added on the south side of the station crossing Carrington Street on the level.

However, by the time the Nottingham and Lincoln Railway opened in August 1846, it was clear that the station could not cope. Not only was there additional traffic from the Erewash Valley Line, and a line from Mansfield was planned, the Ambergate, Nottingham, Boston and Eastern Junction Railway had been approved with running rights over the Midland metals into the station.

Accordingly, a new station was built beyond Carrington Street on the West Croft fronting a newly built Station Street. This station Nottingham Midland opened in 1848.

The site of the station is now occupied by Nottingham Magistrates' Court.

== See also ==
- Nottingham railway station (1848–Present)
- Nottingham Victoria railway station (1900 to 1967)
- Carrington railway station (1899 to 1928)
