= Carrington railway station =

Former railway station in Nottingham, England

Coordinates: 52.96966°N 1.15569°W

Carrington
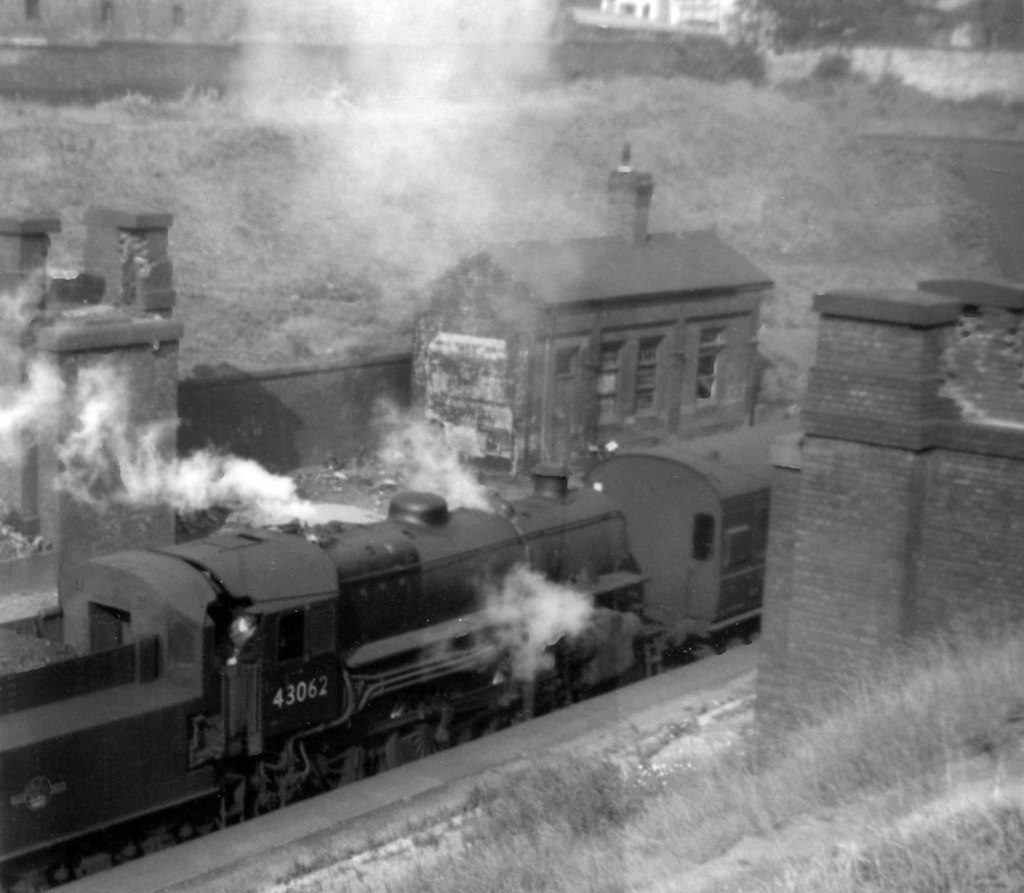
- Carrington station in 1963

General information
- Location: Nottingham, Nottingham, Nottinghamshire; England
- Grid reference: SK568416
- Platforms: 2

Other information
- Status: Disused

History
- Pre-grouping: Great Central Railway
- Post-grouping: London and North Eastern Railway

Key dates
- 15 March 1899: Opened
- 24 September 1928: Closed
Location

Carrington railway station was a railway station in Nottingham on the Great Central Railway main line, the last main line to be built from the north of England to London. The station opened with the line on 15 March 1899, and served the Nottingham suburb of Carrington until 1928.

== History ==
The station was opened by the Great Central Railway on its London Extension and was one of only two original stations on the line to have its platforms on each side, rather than having a single central island. It served a relatively affluent residential area about a mile to the north of the city centre along the Mansfield Road, and thus was popular with business people, and was built in a deep cutting 154 yards (140 metres) in length between the Sherwood Rise and Mansfield Road Tunnels. Had it not been for Carrington station the line would have remained underground here.

There were small waiting rooms on the platforms, but the booking office and main buildings were at street level with a long path leading down to the platforms. However, by the time the station was opened, the city's horse tram network was already well established and by 1901 the tramlines were converted to electricity. This limited the station's usage. It was closed to passenger services on 24 September 1928 - the first station on the Great Central Main Line to close. The line itself closed on 5 September 1966 to passengers and completely on 25 March 1968. There were never any goods facilities at Carrington.

The street-level buildings continued to be used at various times as businesses, including the "Alldogs Poodle Parlour" and a sweet shop, but have now been demolished. The cutting has been filled in to street level, and the Clarendon Park regional facility of the Open University now occupies the site, just north of the east end of Gregory Boulevard, between Sherwood Road and Mansfield Road. Shafts have been provided to maintain access to the tunnels for inspection and maintenance purposes.

There was another station in Nottingham called Carrington Street, later superseded by the present Nottingham station.

Preceding station	Disused railways	Following station
Nottingham Victoria; Line and station closed	Great Central Railway; London Extension	New Basford; Line and station closed
Nottingham Victoria; Line and station closed	Great Northern Railway; Nottingham to Stafford; Nottingham to Pinxton	New Basford; Line and station closed

== See also ==
- Nottingham railway station (1848–Present)
- Nottingham Victoria railway station (1900 to 1967)
- Nottingham Carrington Street railway station (1840 to 1848)
