= Gotham Sidings =

Coordinates: 52°51′43″N 1°10′26″W

Gotham Sidings /ˈɡoʊtəm/, was a set of railway sidings on the Great Central Main Line, where the line crosses Gotham Moor near Gotham, Nottinghamshire. The sidings were set between Rushcliffe Halt and Ruddington railway station.

== History ==
The sidings were constructed between 1899 and 1900, after the completion of the London Extension in 1899, to serve a short branch line to the Limestone (plaster) works of the Gotham Company's works (later British Gypsum) situated in Gotham itself. The branch line closed in 1969. The route of the branch line from Gotham Junction can still be traced, and part of it is now used as a road.

The Great Central Railway (Nottingham) have stated their intention to develop the site along the lines of Swithland Sidings, though there is no road access to the site, there are however farm tracks. The original Signal Box diagrams survive in Loughborough Central Museum.
