= East Leake railway station =

Former railway station in Nottinghamshire, England

East Leake
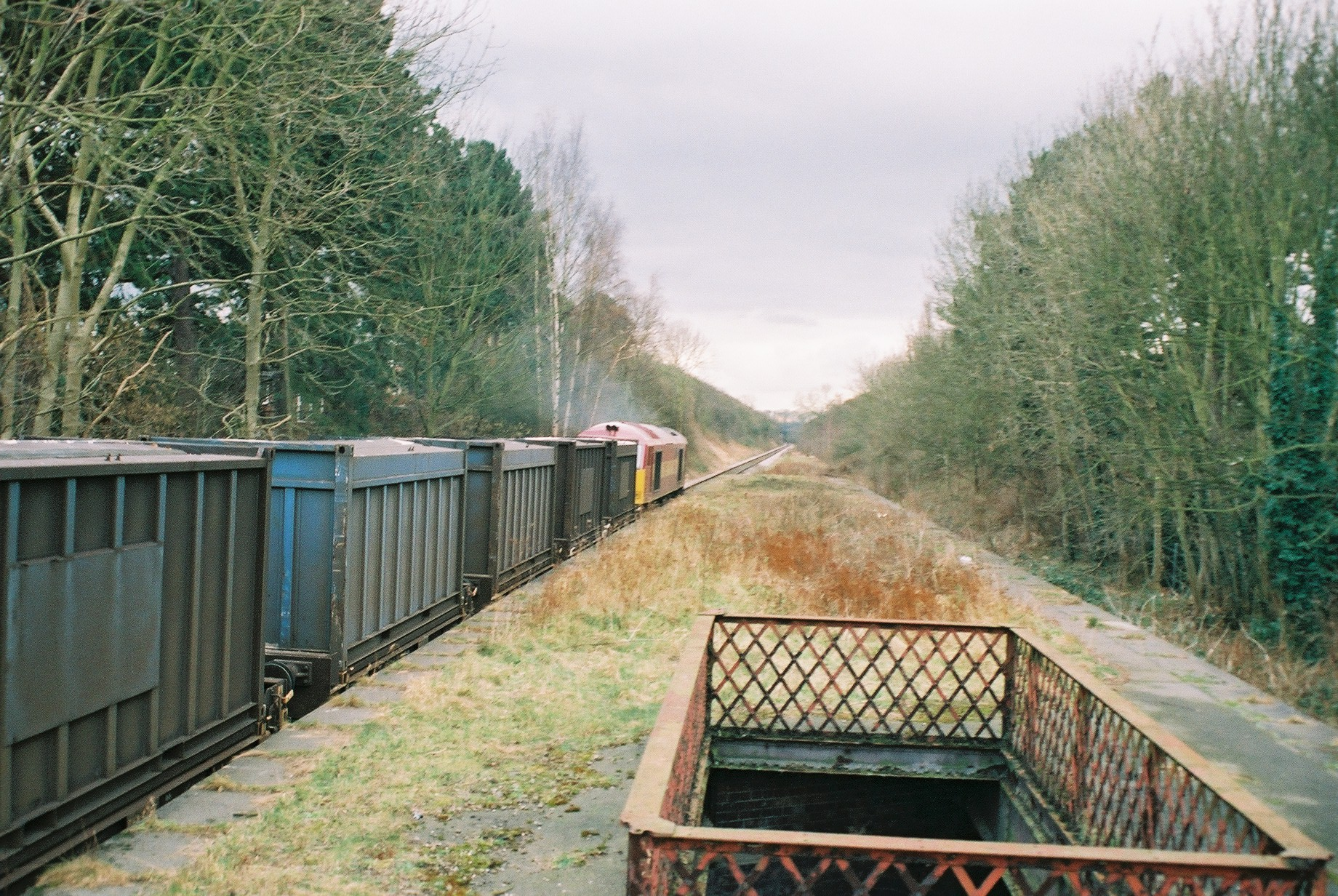
- A train of empty gypsum containers passes through the disused East Leake station

General information
- Location: East Leake, Rushcliffe; England
- Coordinates: 52.83111°N 1.19000°W
- Platforms: 2

Other information
- Status: Disused

History
- Original company: Great Central Railway
- Pre-grouping: Great Central Railway
- Post-grouping: London and North Eastern Railway; British Railways

Key dates
- 15 March 1899: opened
- 5 May 1969: closed
Location

East Leake railway station is a former railway station serving East Leake, Nottinghamshire and, along with Woodford Halse is one of only two surviving Great Central Railway stations accessed from an underbridge rather than an overbridge. The station opened on 15 March 1899 and closed on 5 May 1969. The Great Central Railway (Nottingham) passes through but the station has not reopened mainly due to lack of car parking, and with the station entrance being directly onto the road under the bridge, safety concerns were also a factor. A small goods siding next to the station was redeveloped for housing in the 1990s. The station buildings have been demolished, with the rubble used to fill in the area from the road entrance to the platform. The island platform remains in situ and could still be used if required. Rushcliffe Halt is nearby.

Preceding station	Heritage railways	Following station
Proposed extension
Rushcliffe Halt towards Ruddington Fields	Great Central Railway	Loughborough Central towards Leicester North
Disused railways
Rushcliffe Halt; Line and station open	Great Central Railway; London Extension	Loughborough Central; Line closed, station open
