= Central Railway (UK) =

Company that proposed undersea rail network

The route of the new line

Central Railway was a British company which proposed to build a new intermodal freight railway line, with a generous loading gauge, connecting the Channel Tunnel with the north of England, particularly Liverpool docks, using much of the trackbed of the former north–south Great Central Railway. The company argued that such a line could significantly cut road congestion by carrying lorries on flatbed rail trucks.

The company was formed in the late 1980s, and its proposals were controversial and faced opposition. The plans were rejected by the government in 1996 and again in 2003, largely because of doubts over financing its £8 billion cost, even though it was a private-sector project.

== Route ==
The line would have run from the Liverpool Docks to Sheffield using the disused Woodhead Tunnel and then turned south via the Erewash Valley, joining the former Great Central Main Line (much of whose trackbed was still intact) south of Leicester. At a rebuilt Ashendon Junction it would have joined the Chiltern Main Line, running alongside it on new tracks, then paralleling the M25 motorway, entering a new tunnel between Leatherhead and Merstham and then running alongside existing railways via Tonbridge to the Channel Tunnel terminal at Folkestone. An alternative route would have seen the line joining High Speed 1 to the tunnel, if the latter railway were to allow non-passenger trains.

== Purpose ==
The line would carry goods lorries between the continent and the Midlands and north of England. It could also have helped facilitate railfreight connections between the north of England and the ports of Felixstowe and Southampton. Trains 1.5 kilometres (0.93 mi) long would carry up to 80 lorry trailers each, in the manner of American piggyback services. It would be operated by diesel locomotives, at least in the first instance, in order to save on electrification costs.

The promoters stated that lorries already made a modal interchange to go through the Channel Tunnel. The Central Railway scheme would simply make the interchange between points 400 kilometres (250 mi) or more apart, rather than 40 kilometres (25 mi) at present, saving haulage companies fuel and drastically reducing carbon emissions.

== Financial backing ==
In early 2006, the company said that 11 banks were backing the project.

== Personnel ==
The chairman of Central Railway was Andrew Gritten and chief executive of Central Railway was Alan Stevens, who was a UKIP county councillor in Great Missenden, Buckinghamshire, between 2013 and 2017.
