= Rushcliffe Halt railway station =

Heritage railway station

Rushcliffe Halt
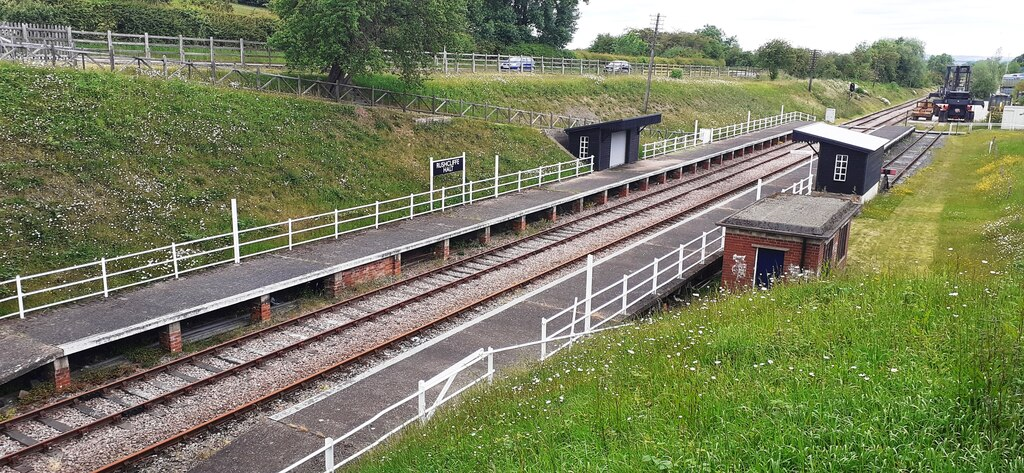
- Rushcliffe Halt looking north towards Ruddington

General information
- Location: East Leake, Rushcliffe; England
- Coordinates: 52.84389°N 1.18222°W
- System: Station on heritage railway
- Operator: Great Central Railway (Nottingham)
- Platforms: 2

History
- Original company: Great Central Railway
- Pre-grouping: Great Central Railway
- Post-grouping: London and North Eastern Railway

Key dates
- 1911: Opened
- 4 March 1963: Closed
- 2003: Reopened
Location

Rushcliffe Halt is a railway station on the former Great Central Railway (GCR) London Extension from London Marylebone, and serves the north of East Leake, Nottinghamshire. It is currently in use as part of the Great Central Railway (Nottingham) (GCRN).

Between September 2020 and December 2024 no public trains used Rushcliffe Halt or any part of the railway line from 50 steps bridge to north of Loughborough due to closure of the line because of structural problems with three bridges, by December 2024 these problems were resolved. The first public trains to run since 2020 was during the Christmas period 2024 with the railway intending to restore a regular service in 2025.

The station was built as a later addition to the GCR, opening in 1911 to serve the adjacent Rushcliffe Golf Club. Later, sidings were added to serve the nearby gypsum works. The station closed to passengers in 1963, although freight continued to serve British Gypsum until the early 1980s.

Rushcliffe Halt is the only surviving example of a GCR station with side platforms, because island platforms were the standard on the route.

During the 1990s, the line and station entered preservation. In 2000, freight trains to the gypsum works resumed and, in 2003, Great Central Railway (Nottingham) introduced a weekend passenger service between Loughborough junction and Nottingham Transport Heritage Centre Ruddington, on a preserved section of the line. GCRN services terminate at a Stop Board close to the A60 road. Beyond that is the connection to Network Rail and the Midland Main Line (MML). There are plans for a high-level station to be built there. The loco shed of the Great Central Railway at Loughborough is just visible, across the MML. There are also plans to reinstate a bridge across the MML and to join up with the GCR at Loughborough on the Leicester side.

Once both preserved sections are re-connected by the bridging of the Loughborough Gap, the line would be over 18 miles (29 km) in length.

As of September 2026, repairs on the previously derelict signal box were almost complete, with repairs to the roof complete and new flooring installed.

Preceding station	Heritage railways	Following station
Terminus	Great Central Railway Nottingham section	Ruddington Fields Terminus
Proposed extension
Ruddington Fields Terminus	Great Central Railway	East Leake towards Leicester North
Disused railways
Ruddington; Line and station closed	Great Central Railway; London Extension	East Leake; Line and station closed
