= Gotham, Nottinghamshire =

Village in Nottinghamshire, England

Coordinates: 52.867°N 1.206°W

Gotham
- Village and civil parish
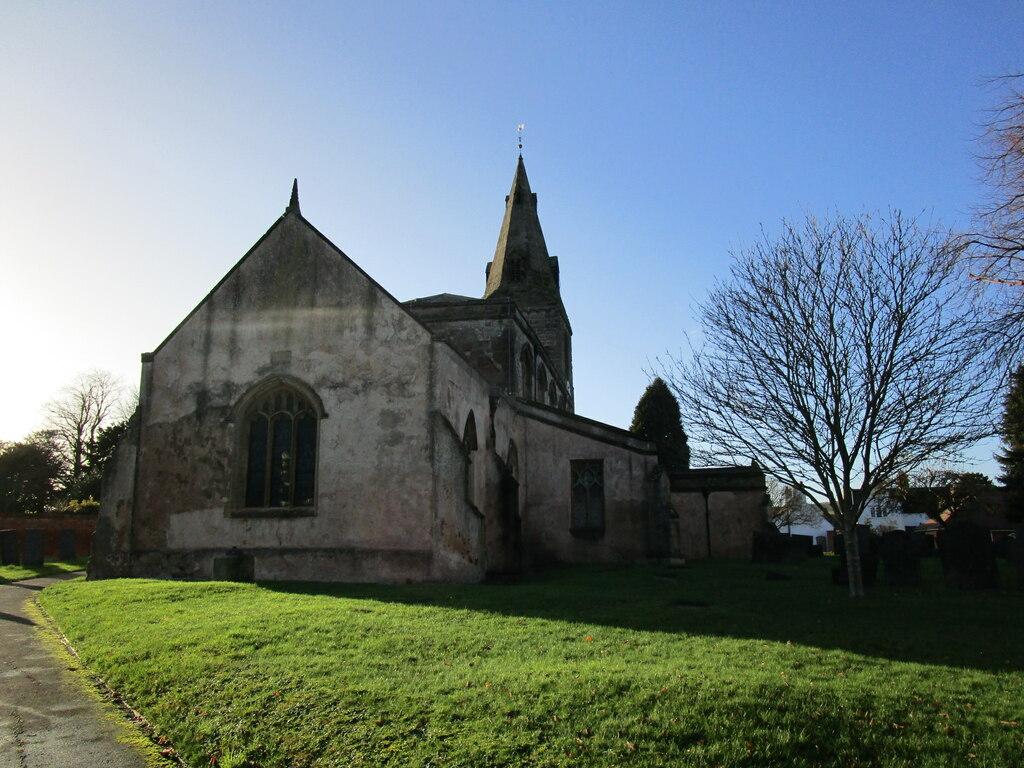
- St Lawrence Church

- Location within Nottinghamshire
- Interactive map of Gotham
- Area: 4.01 sq mi (10.4 km^{2})
- Population: 1,567 (2021 Census)
  - Density: 391/sq mi (151/km^{2})
- OS grid reference: SK 53443 30277
  - London: 105 mi (169 km) SSE
- District: Rushcliffe
- Shire county: Nottinghamshire
- Region: East Midlands
- Country: England
- Sovereign state: United Kingdom
- Post town: NOTTINGHAM
- Postcode district: NG11
- Dialling code: 0115
- Police: Nottinghamshire
- Fire: Nottinghamshire
- Ambulance: East Midlands
- UK Parliament: Rushcliffe
- Website: gothamparishcouncil.uk

Gotham (/ˈɡoʊtəm/ GOHT-əm) is a village and civil parish in Nottinghamshire, England. Its population was 1,563 in the 2011 census and marginally increased to 1,567 in the 2021 census. It is in the borough of Rushcliffe and has a parish council.

The name Gotham comes from the Old English for "goat home".

== References to Gotham in literature ==
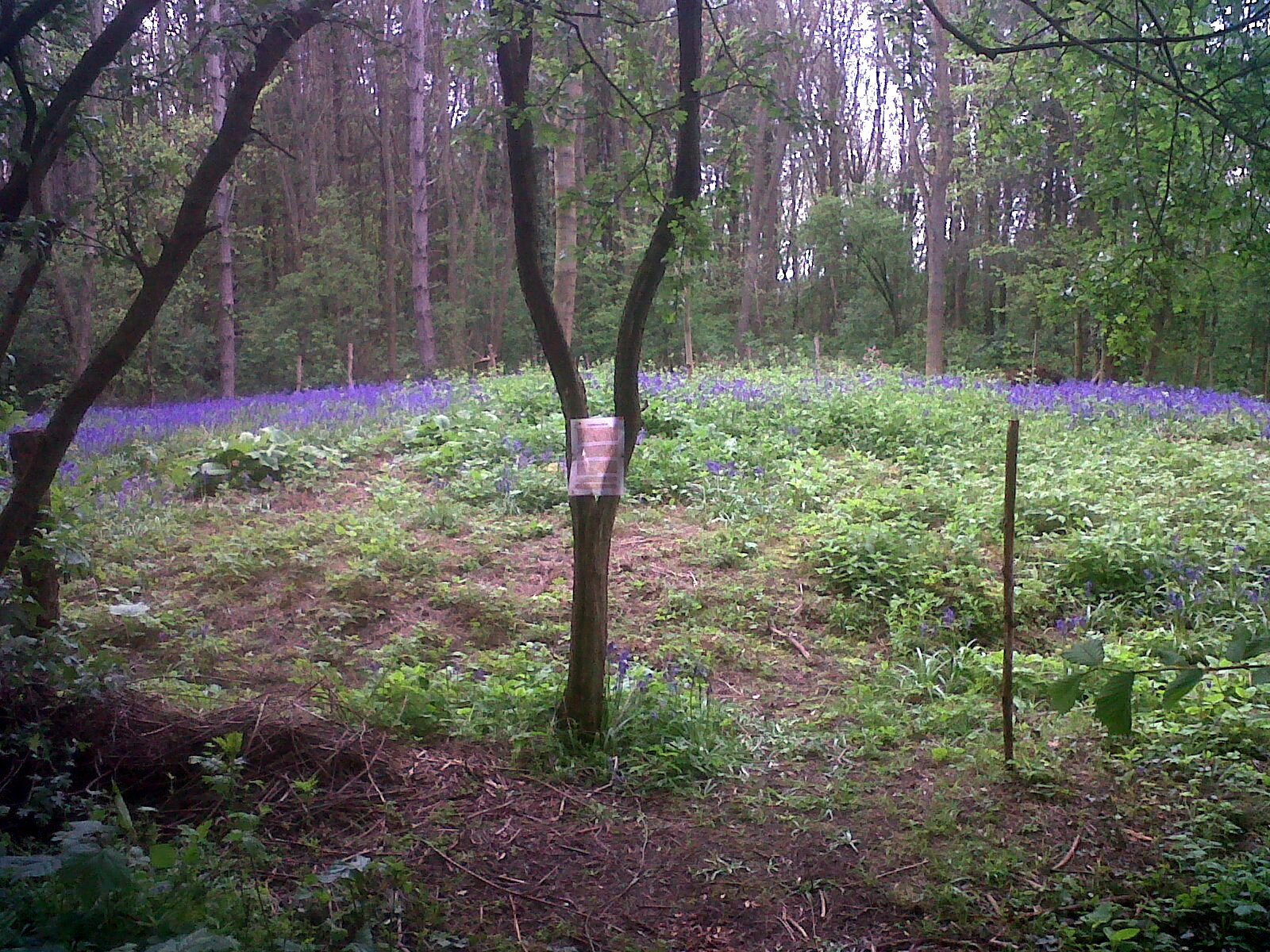
Cuckoo Bush Mound is the alleged site for the tale of the Wise Men of Gotham's attempt at fencing in the cuckoo, but it is actually a Neolithic burial mound. It is about three thousand years old and was excavated in 1847.

The village is most famed for the stories of the "Wise Men of Gotham". These depict the people of the village as being stupid. However, the reason for the behaviour is believed to be that the villagers wished to feign madness to avoid a royal highway being built through the village, as they would then be expected to build and maintain this route. Madness was believed at the time to be highly contagious, and when King John's knights saw the villagers behaving as if insane, the knights swiftly withdrew and the king's road was re-routed to avoid the village.

Gotham magistrates were said to have attempted to fence in a bush to keep a cuckoo captive, this from the Sheriff of Nottingham. One of the three pubs in the village is known as the "Cuckoo Bush Inn".

Reminded of the foolish ingenuity of Gotham's residents, the American writer Washington Irving gave the name "Gotham" to New York City in his Salmagundi Papers (1807). In turn, Bill Finger named Batman's pastiche New York Gotham City. The existence of Gotham, Nottinghamshire in the DC Universe was acknowledged in Batman: Legends of the Dark Knight No. 206 (and again in 52 No. 27), although the connection between two names within the DCU has not been fully explained. In a story titled "Cityscape" in Batman Chronicles No. 6 it is revealed that Gotham was initially built for the purpose of housing the criminally insane, and Robin reads a journal that tells of how Gotham got its name; "I even have a name for it. We could call it 'Gotham' after a village in England – where, according to common belief, all are bereft of their wits."

Responding to the connection between the Gotham in Nottinghamshire and Gotham for New York City, former New York mayor Rudy Giuliani wrote that it was "a pleasure to have this opportunity to acknowledge the cultural and historical link" between the two places.

== Second World War ==
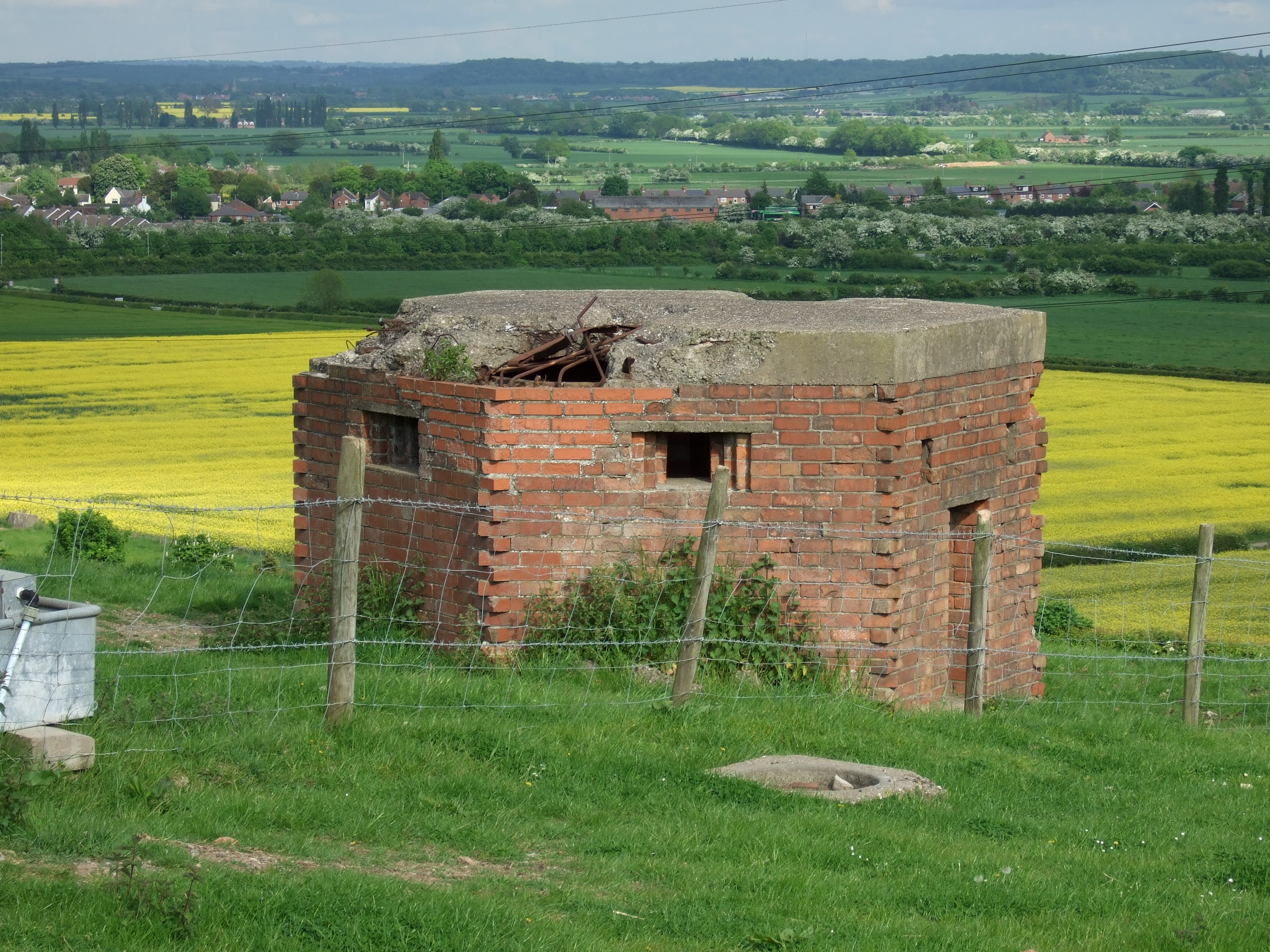
Gotham Pillbox

There are few remaining physical examples of Gotham's wartime past. The word Gotham was removed from the face of the school building and from all signs and direction posts during the Second World War to confuse any enemy troops that may have invaded. The pillbox pictured is the only remaining structure dating from the Second World War in the village. It was one of two pillboxes erected to form a defence for the village and also to serve as a searchlight battery. The damage to the pillbox was caused after the war and was not due to enemy action. On 31 December 2018, a horse had to be rescued by the fire service after becoming trapped in the pillbox.

== Transport ==
Although Gotham has never been served by a passenger railway station, it does lie at the end of a branch line about 2 miles in length that leads westwards from the Great Central main line, opened in March 1899. The branch used to serve a plaster factory and gypsum mines, but was closed in the early 1960s. The main line itself closed to regular services in May 1969, but the section from Loughborough to Ruddington was reopened and is now owned and operated by the Nottingham Heritage Railway, giving access to the railway heritage centre at Ruddington. The closest main line station today is East Midlands Parkway railway station which opened early in 2008 at Ratcliffe-on-Soar providing links on the Midland Main Line.

Gotham was home to the South Notts Bus Company, which provided a bus service between Nottingham and Loughborough running through the village. The South Notts trading name is still used by Nottingham City Transport, which took over the service in 1991.

== Local government and elections ==
=== Parliamentary elections ===
Gotham lies in the Rushcliffe constituency. The Member of Parliament for the seat is James Naish of the Labour Party, elected in 2024. The constituency had previously been represented by Ruth Edwards (Conservative) and Kenneth Clarke, former Chancellor of the Exchequer, from 1970 until 2019.

=== Local government ===
==== County council ====
Gotham lies in the Leake and Ruddington ward, which elects two councillors. In the 2025 election, Andy Brown (Conservative) and Stuart Matthews (Reform UK) were elected with 2,241 and 1,863 votes respectively.

==== District council ====
Gotham is a part of Rushcliffe Borough Council. It is part of the Gotham ward, which elects two councillors, along with Barton in Fabis, Kingston on Soar, Ratcliffe on Soar, and Thrumpton. In the 2023 election, Gotham elected Rex Walker and Andy Brown (Conservative) with 561 and 437 votes respectively.

==== Parish council ====
The parish council has 13 members. The most recent election in 2023 was uncontested.

== Churches ==
The village has a twelfth-century church, St Lawrence's, dedicated to the martyr Lawrence of Rome.

== Other points of interest ==
On 2 August 1984, as rain storms lashed the county, Gotham was hit by a tornado at approximately 5:50 pm, uprooting trees, blowing garden sheds onto power cables, destroying greenhouses and severely damaging houses, roofs and chimneys; however, no one was injured.

Gotham is home to a biological Site of Special Scientific Interest (SSSI) listed as Gotham Hill Pasture.

== See also ==
- Listed buildings in Gotham, Nottinghamshire

== Gallery ==
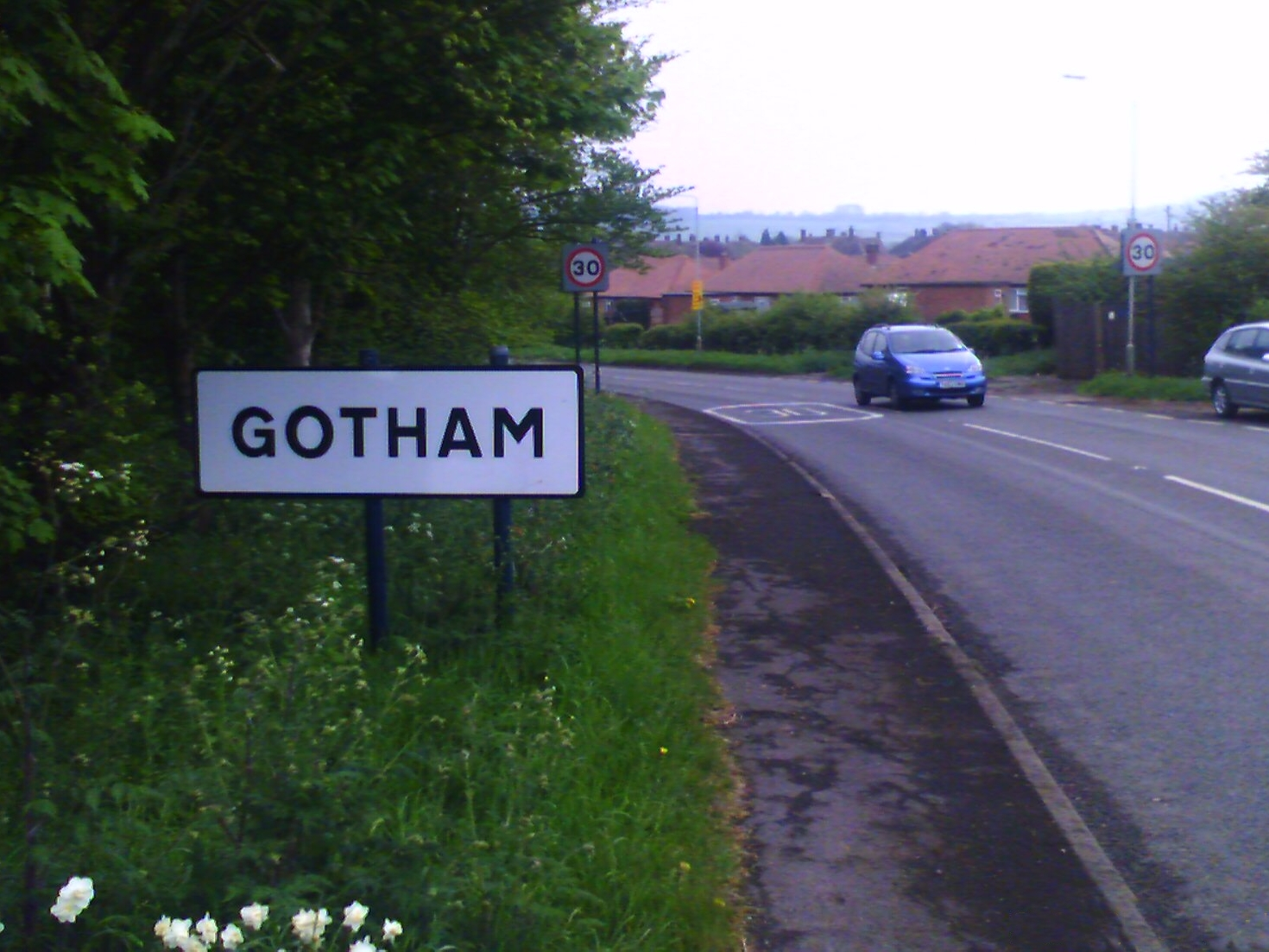
In 2014, the Gotham sign had been stolen three times in four years by Batman fans

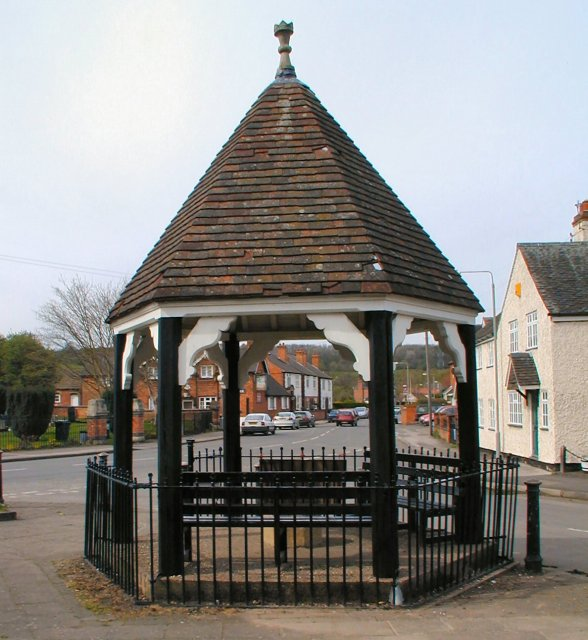
The Square

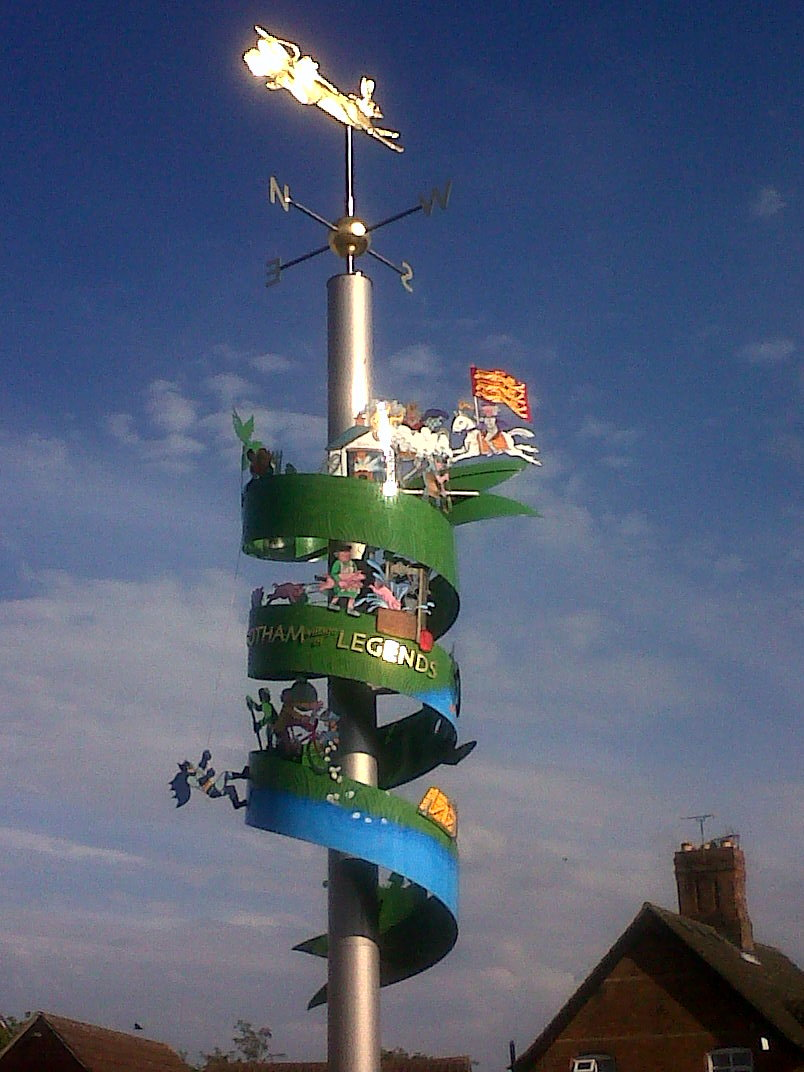
Wind vane in the centre of town displaying the legends of Gotham

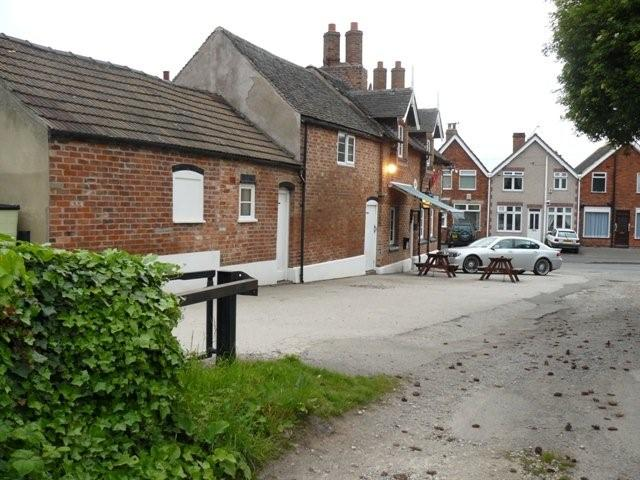
The Cuckoo Bush Inn

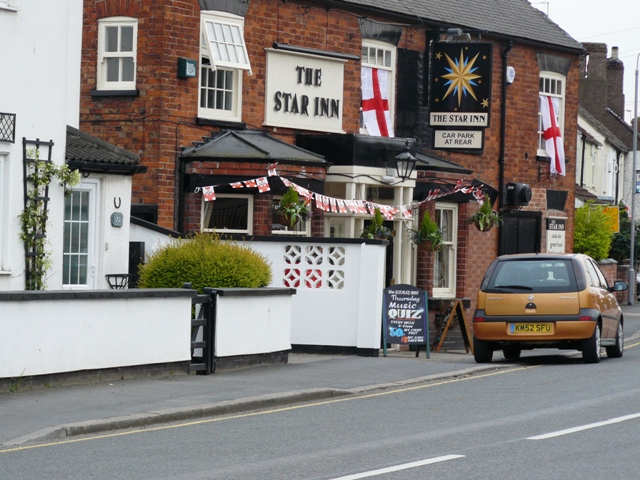
The Star Inn

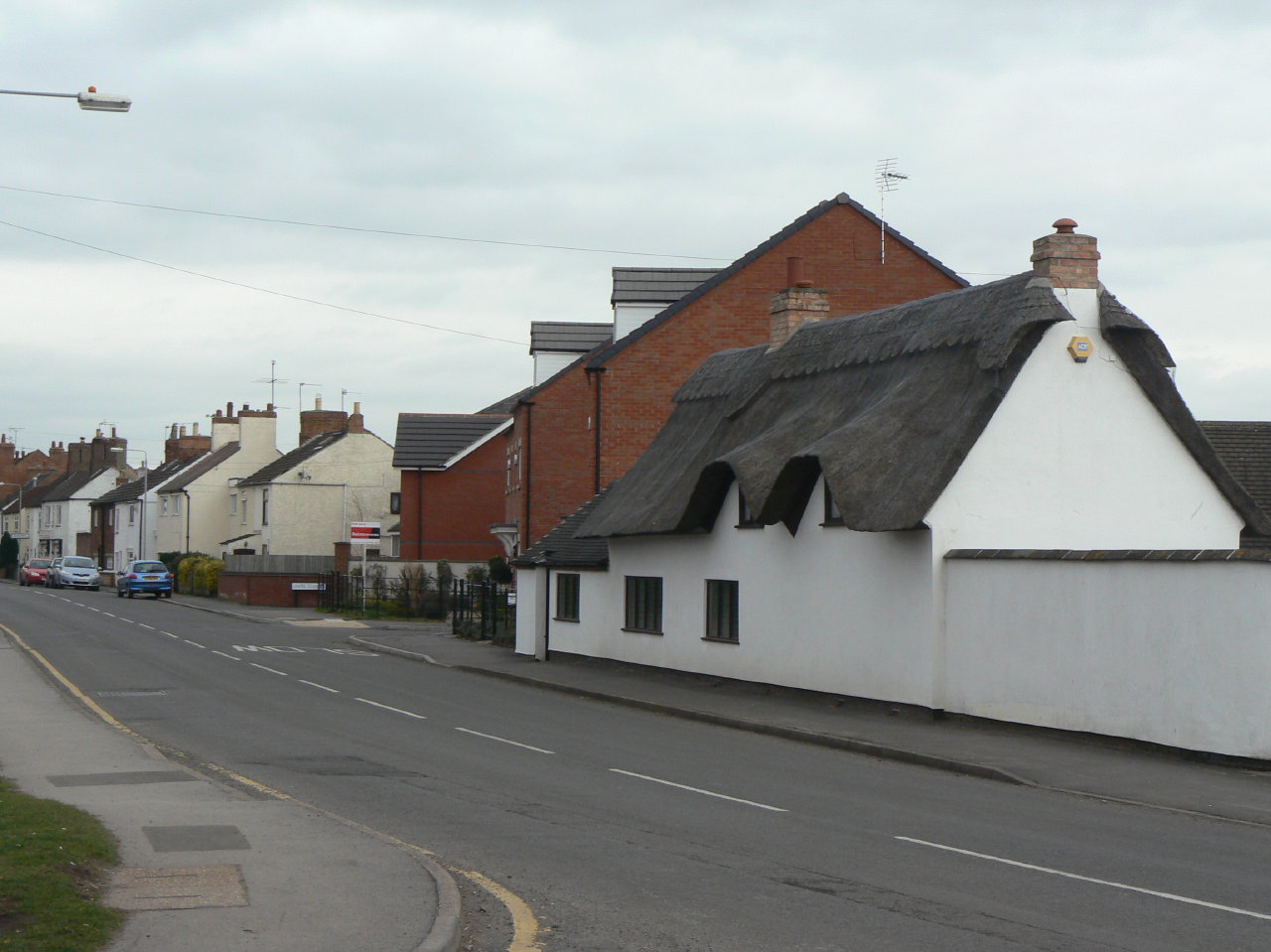
Thatched house on Nottingham Road

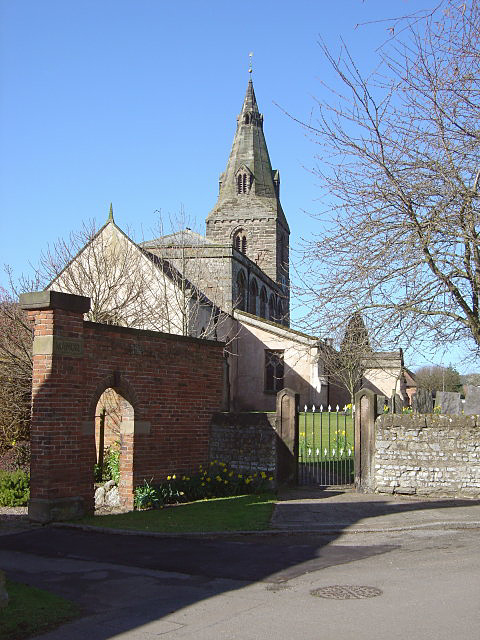
St Lawrence's Church

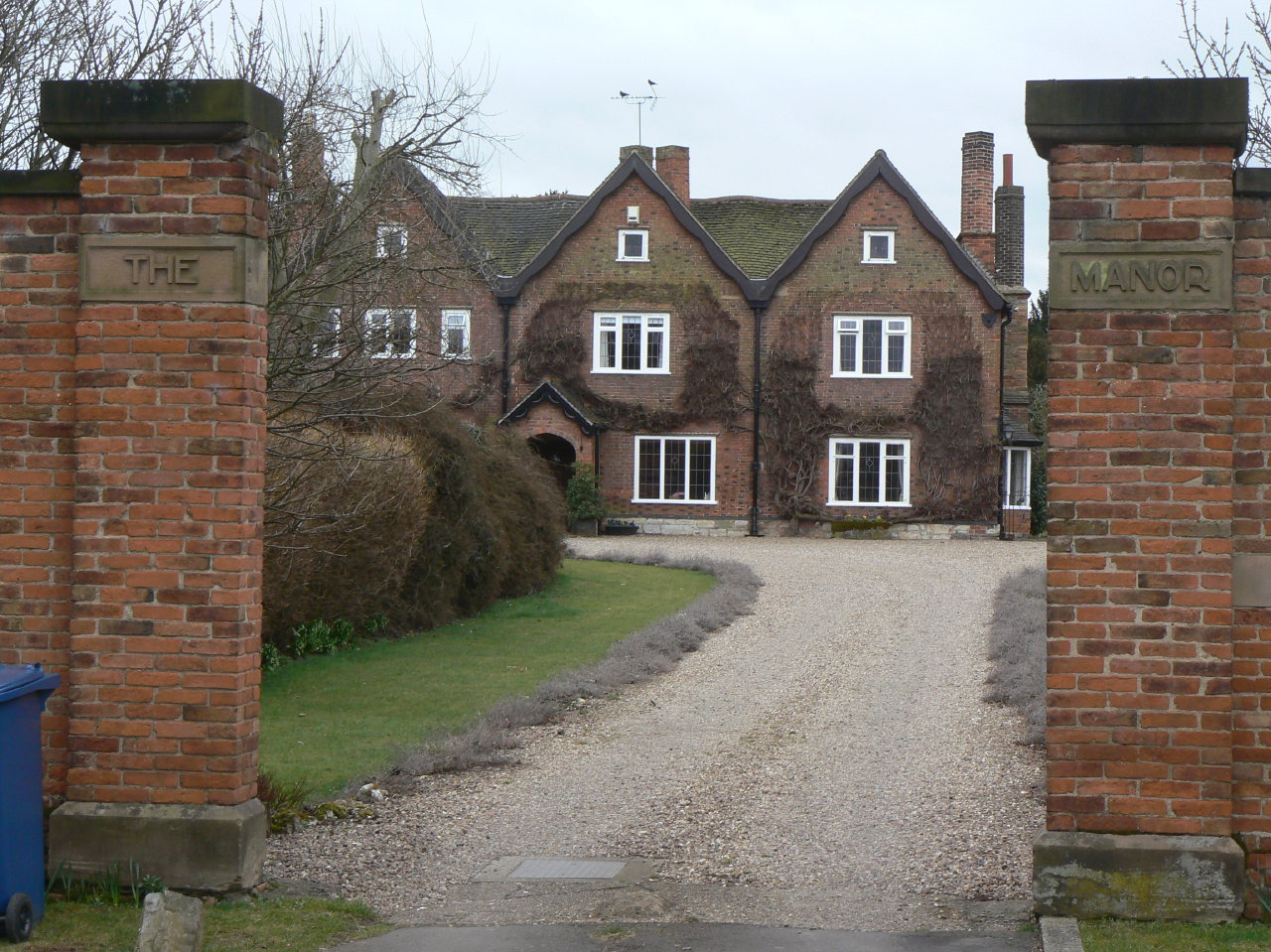
Gotham Manor

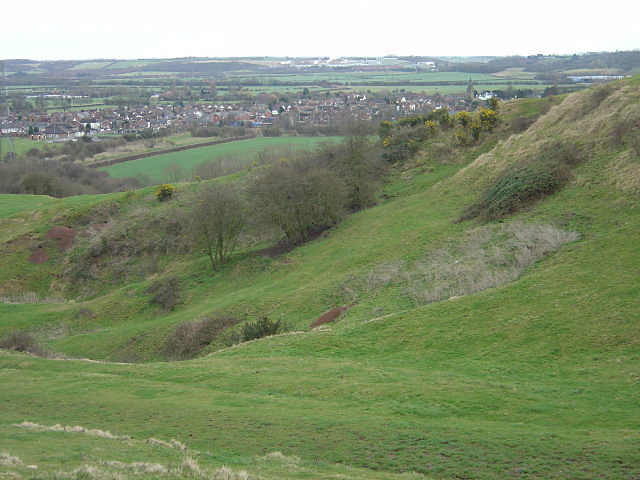
The old gypsum workings on Gotham Hill

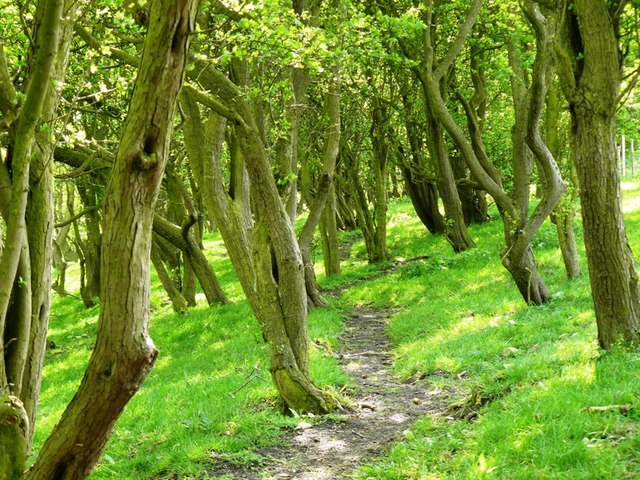
Woods on Gotham Hill

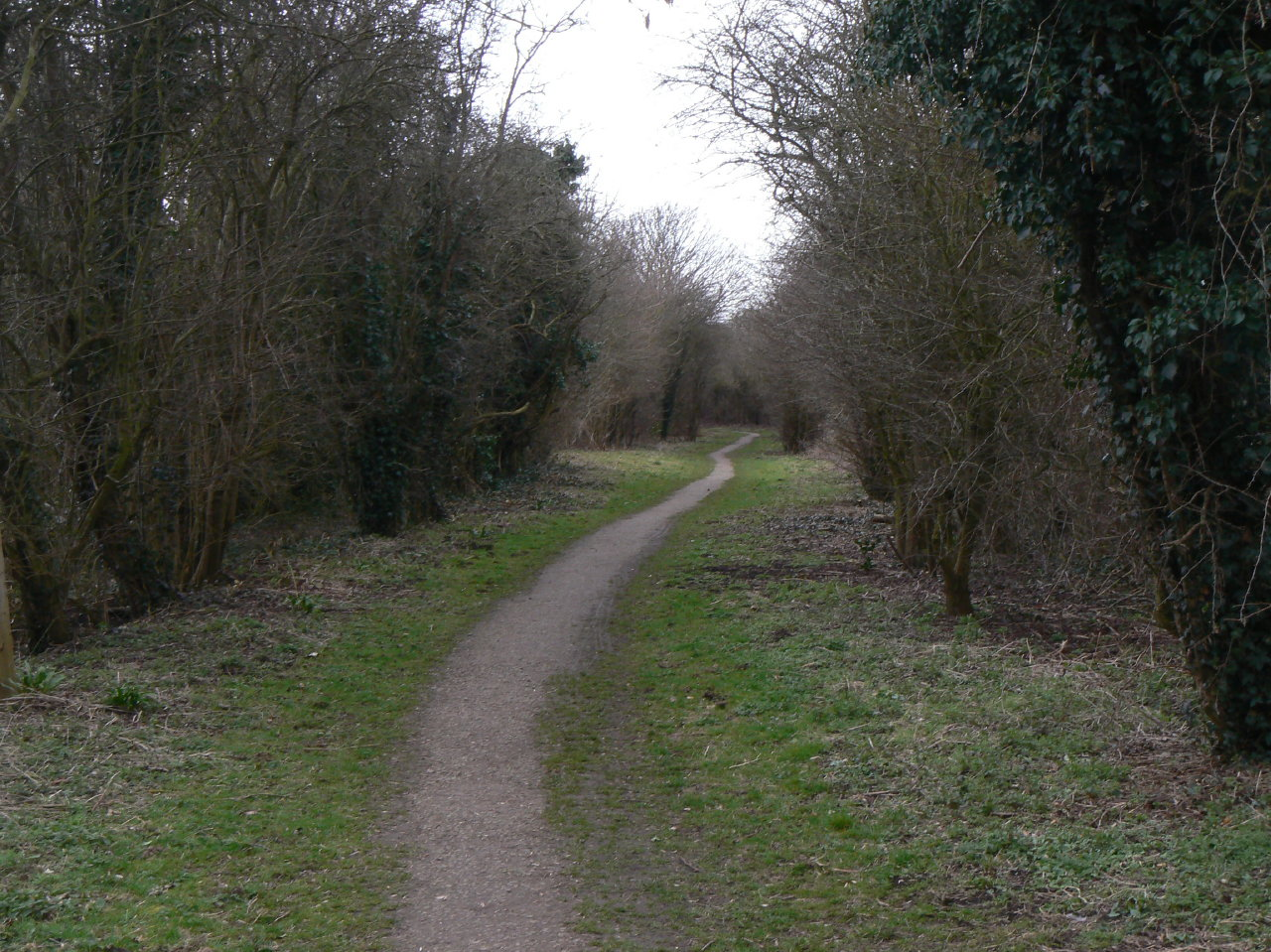
The Gotham branch of the Great Central Railway, now converted to a footpath
