= Great Central Main Line =

Former railway line in the United Kingdom

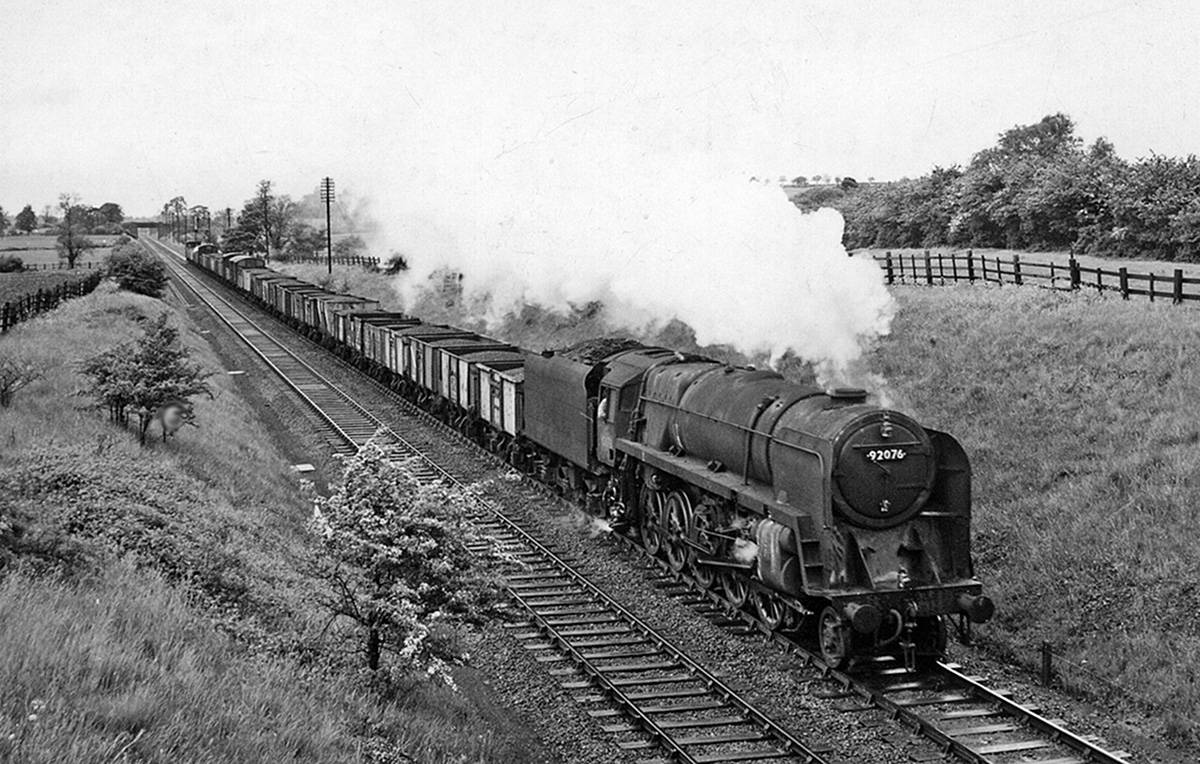
- A freight train on the Great Central near Braunston and Willoughby in 1958.

Overview
- Status: Mostly closed
- Locale: Greater London, South East England, East Midlands, Yorkshire and Humber, Greater Manchester.
- Termini: Marylebone station, London; Manchester London Road Station

Service
- Type: Main Line
- System: National Rail Network

History
- Opened: 1899
- Closed: 1966-1969

Technical
- Number of tracks: Double
- Track gauge: 4 ft 8 1/2 in (1,435 mm) standard gauge

The Great Central Main Line (GCML), also known as the London Extension, is a former main line railway in the United Kingdom. The line was opened in 1899, built by the Manchester, Sheffield and Lincolnshire Railway (MS&LR), which had been renamed the Great Central Railway (GCR) in August 1897, prior to the line's opening. It ran from Sheffield in the North of England, southwards through Nottingham and Leicester to Marylebone in London.

The GCML was the last main line railway to be built in Britain during the Victorian period. It was built by the railway entrepreneur Edward Watkin with the aim to run as a fast trunk route from the North and the East Midlands to London and the south of England. Initially not a financial success, it recovered under the leadership of Sam Fay. Although initially planned for long-distance passenger services, in practice the line's most important function became to carry goods traffic, notably coal.

In the 1960s, British Railways chairman Richard Beeching considered it an unnecessary duplication of other lines that served the same places, especially the Midland Main Line and to a lesser extent the West Coast Main Line. Most of the route was closed between 1966 and 1969 under the Beeching axe.

Parts of the former main line have been preserved as the Great Central Railway between Leicester and Loughborough, and the Great Central Railway (Nottingham) between Loughborough South Junction and Ruddington's former GCR station site.

At the end of the 20th century and in the 21st century, the line has been subject to a range of proposals for its use and reuse.

== Route ==
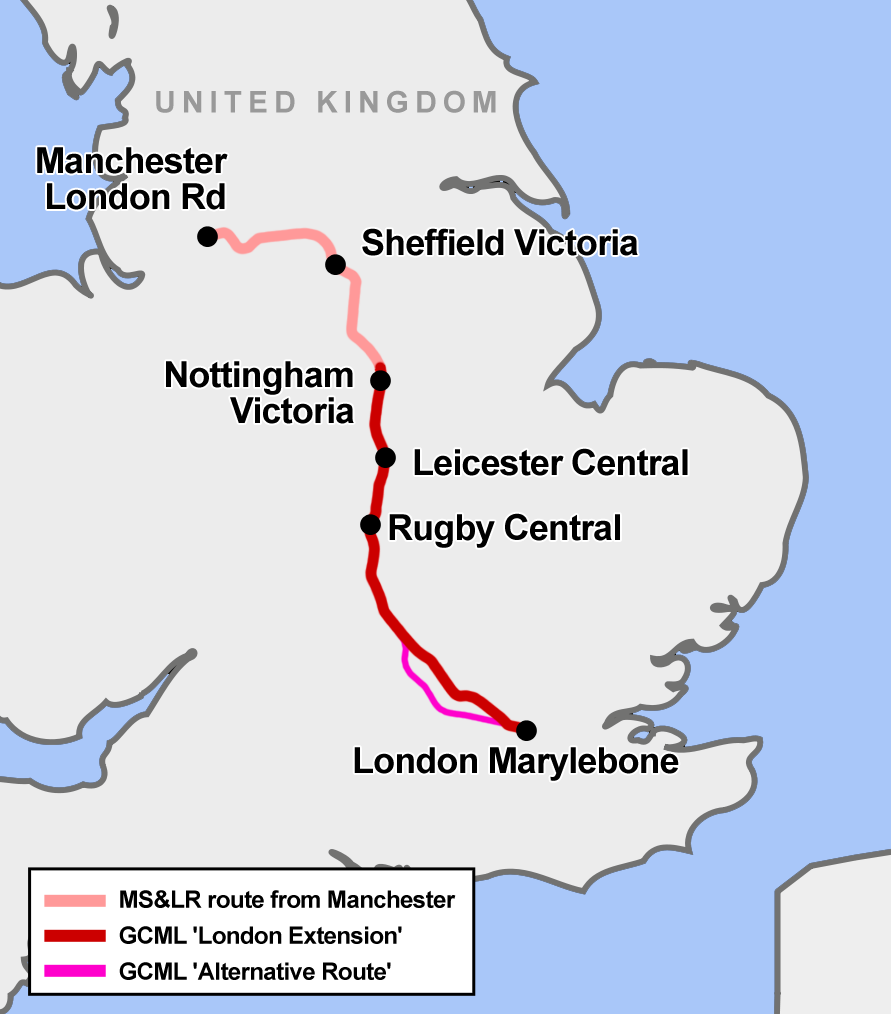
Route map of the Great Central Main Line

The GCML was very much a strategic line in concept. It was not intended to duplicate the Midland line by serving a great many centres of population. Instead it was intended to link the MS&LR's system stretching across northern England directly to London at as high a speed as possible and with a minimum of stops and connections: thus much of its route ran through sparsely populated countryside.

The new construction started at Annesley north of Nottingham, running for 92 miles (148 km) in a relatively direct southward route ending at Quainton Road north of Aylesbury. The line left the crowded corridor through Nottingham (and Nottingham Victoria), which was also used by the Great Northern Railway (GNR), then struck off to its new railway station at Leicester Central, passing Loughborough en route, where it crossed the Midland main line. Four railway companies served Leicester: GCR, Midland, GNR, and LNWR. Avoiding Wigston, the GCR served Lutterworth (the only town on the GCR not to be served by another railway company) before reaching the town of Rugby (at Rugby Central), where it crossed at right-angles over, and did not connect with, the LNWR's West Coast Main Line.

It continued southwards to Woodford Halse, where there was a connection with the East and West Junction Railway (later incorporated into the Stratford-upon-Avon and Midland Junction Railway), and slightly further south the GCR branch to the Great Western Railway station at Banbury diverged. From Woodford Halse the route continued approximately south-east via Brackley to Calvert and Quainton Road, where Great Central trains joined the Metropolitan Railway (later Metropolitan and Great Central Joint Railway) via Aylesbury into London.

Partly because of disagreements with the Metropolitan Railway (MetR) over use of their tracks at the southern end of the route, the company built the Great Western and Great Central Joint Railway joint line (1906) from Grendon Underwood to Ashendon Junction, by-passing the greater part of the MetR's tracks.

Apart from a small freight branch to Gotham between Nottingham and Loughborough, and the "Alternative Route" link added later (1906), these were the only branch lines from the London extension. The line crossed several other railways but had few junctions with them.

North of Sheffield, express trains on the London extension made use of the pre-existing MS&LR trans-Pennine main line, the Woodhead Line (now also closed) to give access to Manchester London Road (now named Manchester Piccadilly).

== History ==
=== Reasons for construction ===
In 1864 Sir Edward Watkin took over directorship of the Manchester, Sheffield & Lincolnshire Railway (MS&LR). He had grand ambitions for the company: he had plans to transform it from a provincial middle-of-the-road railway company into a major national player. He grew tired of handing over potentially lucrative London-bound traffic to rivals, and, after several unsuccessful attempts in the 1870s to co-build a line to London with other companies, decided that the MS&LR needed to create its own route to the capital. Construction of the GCML was commissioned to enable Watkin's railway company to operate its own direct express route to London independently of – and in competition with – rival railway companies.

At the time many people questioned the wisdom of building the line, as all the significant population centres which the line traversed were already served by other companies. However, Watkin defended it by arguing that growth in traffic would justify the new line.

Watkin was an ambitious visionary; as well as running an independent trunk route into London, where he was chairman of the Metropolitan Railway, he was also involved in a project to dig a channel tunnel under the English Channel to connect with the rail network of France, a scheme vetoed several times by the British Parliament for fear of military invasion by France; however, this project was effectively moribund by the time work on the GCML commenced, and historians who have examined the available primary sources have found no contemporaneous statement by Watkin that he envisaged through workings over the lines he controlled from Manchester to France.

==== Misconceptions over loading gauge ====
Although it is frequently claimed that Watkin's Great Central Main Line was designed to the larger continental European loading gauge with the aim of accommodating mainland rolling stock should the line could be connected via a future channel tunnel, this is untrue. It was built to the standard Great Central loading gauge of the time, which was in fact slightly more restrictive than some other British railways; and it was certainly not to Berne gauge, which is some 8 in. (200 mm) taller and was not agreed and adopted until 1912/13.

=== The Derbyshire Lines ===
Prior to the construction of the London Extension proper, the MS&LR had extended its reach southwards from its main trans-Pennine axis. On 26 July 1889 the company obtained an Act of Parliament to construct a line from Woodhouse Junction on its original Sheffield to Lincoln main line to Annesley in Nottinghamshire. The 'Derbyshire Lines' also included a branch from Staveley to Chesterfield; an extension of this to Heath, converting the branch into a loop line, was authorised on 25 July 1890. The primary purpose of the Derbyshire Lines was to give the MS&LR access to the collieries of Nottinghamshire, but it also served as the first phase in the company's plan to construct an independent route to London. At Annesley the line from Woodhouse ran into the northern end of the marshalling yard built and operated by the Great Northern Railway (GNR) since 1882. This yard was adjacent to Newstead colliery and also had a connection with the Midland Railway. Thus MS&LR trains could run through onto the GNR's Leen Valley line and so southwards onto the rest of the GNR network via Nottingham and Grantham to the terminus of the GNR at King's Cross. This gave the MS&LR a more convenient route to send both freight and passenger traffic (the latter by through-coaches and ticketing agreements with the GNR) to London from its main line. Annesley was also only a little more than 90 miles (140 km) from London.

The Derbyshire Lines opened in stages. Passenger services began as follows: Beighton – Staveley Town on 1 June 1892; Staveley Town – Chesterfield on 4 June 1892; Staveley Town – Heath – Annesley on 2 January 1893; and Chesterfield – Heath on 3 July 1893. In some cases, goods services began earlier. By the time these routes were in full operation the MS&LR was already seeking approval in Parliament for their bill to authorise the London Extension. Once the London Extension was opened (and the MS&LR had become the Great Central Railway) the Derbyshire Lines were, for all practical purposes, treated as a continuation of the new main line to London, with the entire route from Sheffield Victoria to London Marylebone (via the original MS&LR main line, the Derbyshire Lines and the London Extension) being considered as the Great Central Main Line.

=== Construction of the line ===
In the 1890s the MS&LR set about building its own line, having received powers in the Manchester, Sheffield and Lincolnshire Railway (Extension to London, &c.) Act 1893 (56 & 57 Vict. c. i) on 28 March 1893, for the London extension. The bill nearly failed due to opposition from cricketers at the Marylebone Cricket Club in London through which the line would pass, but it was agreed to put the line through a tunnel under the grounds. The first sod of the new railway was cut at Alpha Road, St John's Wood, London, on 13 November 1894 by Countess Wharncliffe, wife of 1st Earl of Wharncliffe, the chairman of the board.

The new line, 92 miles (148 km) long, started at Annesley, being in effect an extension of the newly completed Derbyshire Lines. The new London-bound line started at the northern entrance to the Annesley marshalling yard (this point becoming the new Annesley North Junction) from where it passed to the east of the sidings and the GNR Leen Valley line before bridging over both the GNR and Midland lines at Linby and heading to Nottingham. The southern end of the London Extension was at Quainton Road in Buckinghamshire. From here, the route followed the existing Metropolitan Railway (MetR) extension which became joint MetR/GCR owned as far as Harrow and thence along the (GCR owned) final section to Marylebone station.

Construction of the route involved some major engineering works, including three new major city-centre stations (Nottingham Victoria, Leicester Central and Marylebone) along with many smaller ones. A number of new viaducts were constructed for the line including the 21-arch Brackley Viaduct, and viaducts at Braunston, Staverton and Catesby in Northamptonshire, a steel lattice viaduct known as the 'bird cage' bridge carried the GCML over the West Coast Main Line at Rugby, while another viaduct was built over the River Soar, along with two over Swithland Reservoir in Leicestershire, and one over the River Trent near Nottingham. Several tunnels had to be built, the longest of which was the 2,997 yards (2,740 m) Catesby Tunnel. Many miles of cuttings and embankments were also built.

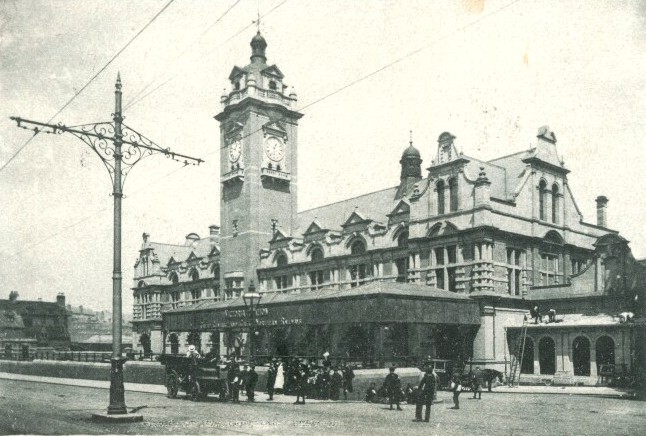
Nottingham Victoria railway station

The construction of the railway through Nottingham and the station involved heavy earthworks with 6,750 feet (2,060 m) of tunnelling and almost 1 mile (1.6 km) of viaduct. The site for Nottingham Victoria railway station required the demolition of 1,300 houses, 20 public houses and the clearing of a cutting from which 600,000 cubic yards (460,000 m^{3}) of sandstone were removed. The purchase of the land cost £473,000 (equivalent to £53,770,000 in 2025), and the construction of the station brought the sum to over £1,000,000.

The original estimated cost for the construction of the line was £3,132,155, however in the event it cost £11,500,000 (equivalent to £1.27765×10^{9} in 2025), nearly four times the original estimate.

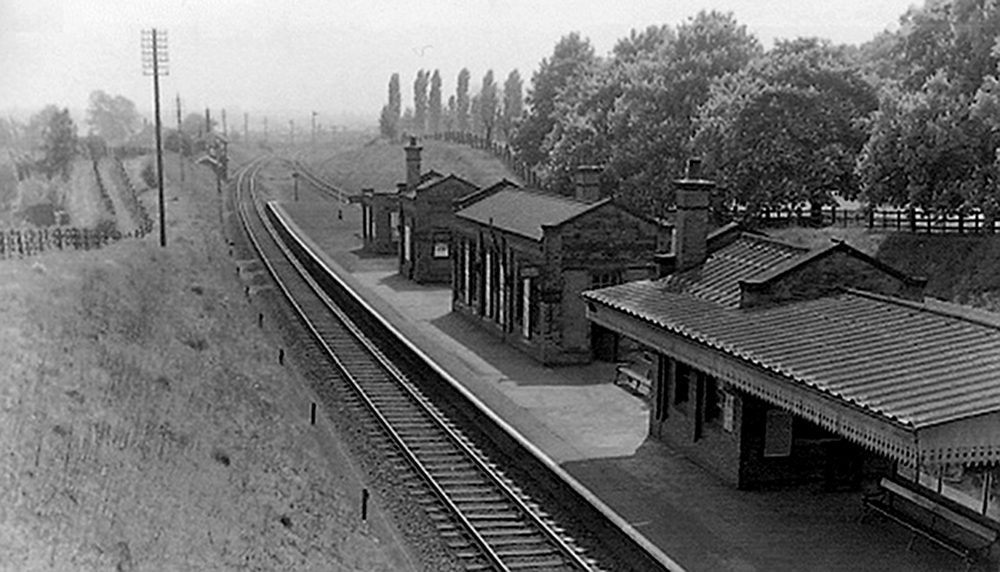
Belgrave and Birstall station, typical of the island platform design used on the London Extension

Features of the line were:

- The line was engineered to very high standards: a ruling gradient of 1 in 176 (5.7 ‰) (exceeded in only a few locations on the London extension) was employed; curves of a minimum radius of 1 mile (1.6 km) (except in city areas) were used; and there was only one level crossing between Sheffield Victoria and London Marylebone (at Beighton, still in use).
- The standardised design of stations, almost all of which were built to an "island platform" design with one platform between the two tracks instead of two at each side. This would aid any future plans to add extra tracks (as was done in several locations).

The line was formally opened by Charles Ritchie, 1st Baron Ritchie of Dundee, President of the Board of Trade on 9 March 1899. Three special corridor trains, forming part of the new rolling stock constructed for the new line, were run from Manchester, Sheffield and Nottingham to the terminus at Marylebone for the inaugural ceremony. A lunch for nearly 300 guests was provided, and then the trains made the return trip.

Public passenger services began on 15 March 1899, and for goods traffic on 11 April 1899. Shortly before the opening of the new line, the MS&LR changed its name to the grander-sounding "Great Central Railway" (GCR) to reflect its new-found national ambitions.

The London extension was the last mainline railway line to be built in Britain until section one of High Speed 1 opened in 2003. It was also the shortest-lived intercity railway line.

== Traffic on the London extension ==
=== Passenger ===
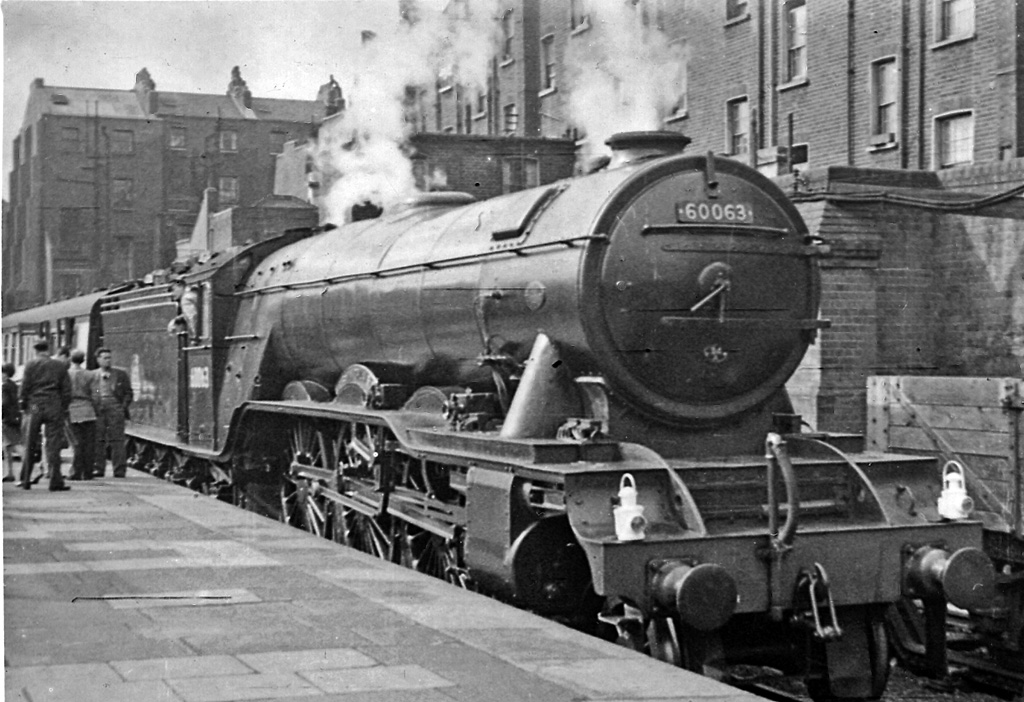
10am London to Manchester express hauled by LNER A3 Pacific No.60063 'Isinglass' at Marylebone in May 1956

The London Extension's main competitor was the Midland Railway which had served the route between London, the East Midlands and Sheffield since the 1860s on its Midland Main Line. Traffic was slow to establish itself on the new line, passenger traffic especially so. Enticing customers away from the established lines into London was more difficult than the GCR's builders had hoped. However, there was some success in appealing to higher-class 'business' travellers in providing high-speed luxurious trains, promoted by the jingle 'Rapid Travel in Luxury'. These were in a way the first long-distance commuter trains.

The Great Central also became important for cross-country trains, which took advantage of its connections to other lines. At the height of fast, long-distance passenger steam trains in the 1930s, there were six expresses a day from Marylebone to Sheffield, calling at Leicester and Nottingham, and onto Manchester. Some of these achieved a London–Sheffield timing of 3 hours and 6 minutes in 1939, making them fully competitive with the rival Midland service out of St Pancras in terms of journey time.

=== Freight ===
Freight traffic grew healthily and became the lifeblood of the line, the staples being coal, iron ore, steel, and fish and banana trains. The connection with the Stratford-upon-Avon and Midland Junction Railway at Woodford Halse proved strategically important for freight on the route. Another major centre for freight was at Annesley. The relatively sparse passenger service on the GCML, especially as traffic declined after the Second World War, allowed time and room on the line for more heavy fast freight services than on the busier Midland Main Line or East Coast Main Line. In 1947 the LNER began running special fast coal trains between Annesley and Woodford Halse – a distance of around 70 miles (110 km). Wagons filled from the South Yorkshire and Nottinghamshire collieries were assembled into trains at Annesley and taken to Woodford Halse where they would be sorted into separate onward trains depending on the wagons' destination to the south.

The relatively sparse service pattern on the GCML and the line's high engineering standards with near-continuous but gentle rising and falling gradients, made it possible to run these trains at much higher speeds than was normal. Coal trains, consisting of mineral wagons not equipped with brakes that could be controlled by the driver, usually ran at no more than 25 mph (40 km/h) and had to descend steep gradients at little more than walking pace. On the GCML these trains could run at 50 or 60 mph (80 or 97 km/h), continually but slowly accelerating away from Annesley (which kept the couplings between taut and the wagons stable) and being able to run without needing to slow for gradients or for other traffic until they slowed for arrival at Woodford Halse. Originally known as the 'Annesley Runners', these trains became known as the 'Windcutters' in the British Railways era.

=== Decline and closure ===
In the 1923 Grouping the Great Central Railway was merged into the London and North Eastern Railway, which in 1948 was nationalised along with the rest of Britain's railway network. The Great Central thrived in the early years of nationalisation. However, from the late 1950s onwards the freight traffic upon which the line relied started to decline, and the GCR route was largely neglected as other railway lines were thought to be more important.

Although a very straight and direct line, it was designated a duplicate of the curvier Midland Main Line. In 1958 the line was transferred from the management of British Rail's Eastern Region to its London Midland Region, whose management still had loyalties to former companies (Midland/LMS) and against their rivals GCR/LNER.

In January 1960, express passenger services from London to Sheffield and Manchester were discontinued, leaving only three "semi-fast" London-Nottingham trains per day. In March 1963 local trains on many parts of the route were cancelled and many rural local stations were closed. However, at this time it was still hoped that better use of the route could be made for parcels and goods traffic.

In the 1960s Beeching cuts, Dr Beeching decided that the London to Northern England route was already well served by other lines, to which most of the traffic on the GCR could be diverted. Closure was seen as inevitable.

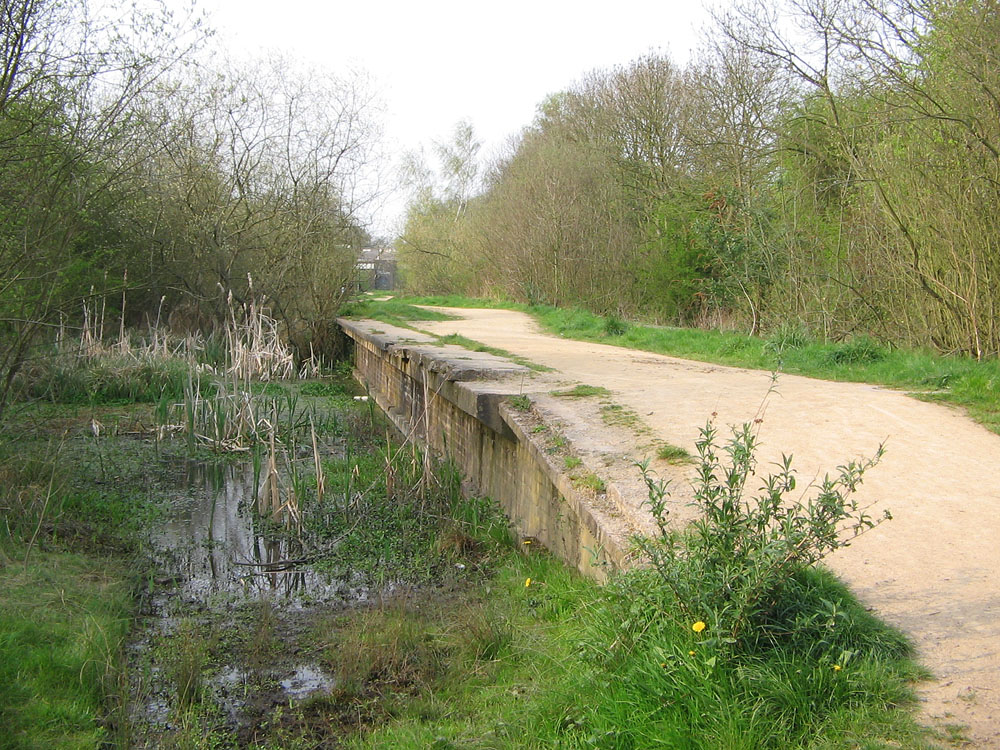
The remains of Rugby Central station

The sections between Rugby and Aylesbury and between Nottingham and Sheffield were closed in 1966, leaving only an unconnected stub between Rugby and Nottingham, on which a skeleton shuttle service operated. This last stretch was closed to passenger services in May 1969. Goods trains continued to run on the London Extension between Nottingham and East Leake until 1973, until the construction of a chord connecting the London Extension to the Midland Main Line at Loughborough Central. Trains continued to run between Loughborough and East Leake using the chord until the early 2020s.

The closure of the GCR was the largest single closure of the Beeching era, and one of the most controversial. In a letter published in The Daily Telegraph on 28 September 1965, Denis Anthony Brian Butler, 9th Earl of Lanesborough, a peer and railway supporter, wrote:

[Among] the main lines in the process of closure, surely the prize for idiotic policy must go to the destruction of the until recently most profitable railway per ton of freight and per passenger carried in the whole British Railways system, as shown by their own operating statistics. These figures were presented to monthly management meetings until the 1950s, when they were suppressed as "unnecessary", but one suspects really "inconvenient" for those proposing Beeching type policies of unnecessarily severe contraction of services [...] This railway is of course the Great Central [...].

== Remaining infrastructure ==
The trackbed of the 40-mile (64 km) stretch of main line between Calvert and Rugby, closed in 1966, is still intact except for missing viaducts at Brackley and Willoughby. Various proposals for its reopening have been made.

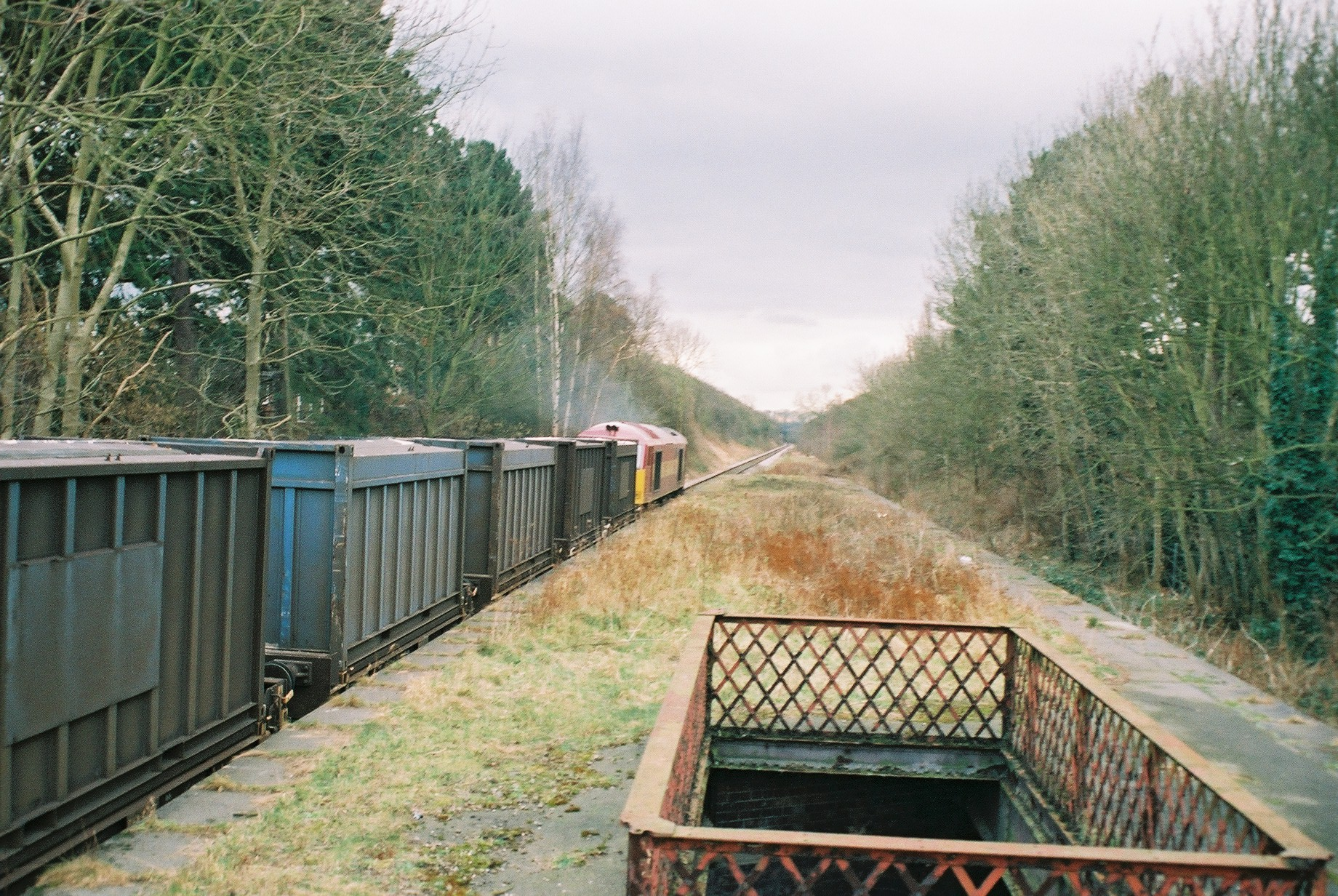
Gypsum train running past the remains of the former East Leake station in February 2002. This short stretch of the GCML north of Loughborough is still used by freight trains.

Frequent passenger services operated by Chiltern Railways run over the joint line between London Marylebone and Aylesbury Vale Parkway, and also between Marylebone and High Wycombe (continuing northwards to Princes Risborough, Bicester North, Banbury and Birmingham Snow Hill via the Chiltern Main Line) using the line between Neasden South Junction and Northolt Junction which was built, maintained and run by the GCR.

A short extension of Chiltern passenger services to a new Aylesbury Vale Parkway station on the Aylesbury-Bicester main road opened on 14 December 2008. There are also heritage diesel shuttle services on the May Bank Holiday and August Bank Holiday weekends between Aylesbury and Quainton Road stations, the latter serving the Buckinghamshire Railway Centre.

In November 2011 HM Government allocated funding for reopening of the section between Bicester Town and Bletchley (via Claydon Junction), and between Aylesbury Vale Parkway and Claydon Junction, as part of the East West Rail scheme, which might have seen passenger services operating between Reading and Milton Keynes Central (via Oxford) and between London Marylebone and Milton Keynes (via Aylesbury). as of January 2021, this element is 'under review'; the Transport and Works Order states that no provision is to be made for a Milton Keynes Central–Marylebone service.

Currently, this stretch of route is used for freight consisting of binliner (containerised domestic waste) and spoil trains going to the Calvert Waste Facility (landfill) site at Calvert just south of Calvert station. Four container trains each day use the site, originating from Brentford, Cricklewood and Northolt. There was also a daily train from Bath and Bristol (known as the "Avon Binliner") until April 2011. The containers, each of which contains 14 tonnes of waste, are unloaded at the transfer station onto lorries awaiting alongside which then transport the waste to the landfill site. The site, dating from 1977 and now one of the largest in the country, stretches to 106 hectares (260 acres) and partly reuses the clay pits dug out by Calvert Brickworks which closed in 1991.

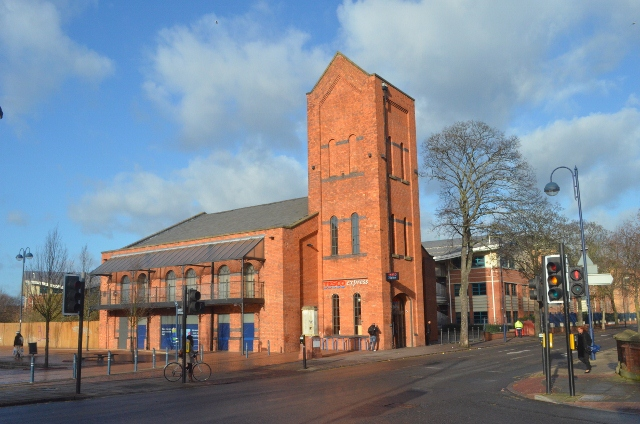
The ex GCR hydraulic power house in Leicester is now a Tesco store in December 2011

The Main Line Preservation Group was established in 1968, to preserve part of the remaining section of the Great Central main line. The group was reformed, in 1971, as Main Line Steam Trust Limited and the group's original ambitions were trimmed to exclude the section north of Loughborough. Restoration work on the line between Loughborough Central and the northern outskirts of Leicester commenced and, by 1973, Steam train services were operated under the supervision of a British Railways Inspector. In 1976 operations were transferred to Great Central Railway (1976) Limited a company that, as Great Central Railway plc, remains active to this day.

The section of line between Loughborough South Junction, where the branch is connected to the Midland Mainline, and Ruddington is operated as a heritage railway by the Great Central Railway (Nottingham) (GCRN). The section of GCRN route between Loughborough South Jn and East Leake is maintained to mainline standard and used by trains serving the Gypsum works at East Leake.

North of Ruddington, and as far as Nottingham, sections of the GCML right of way are used by the Nottingham Express Transit (NET), Nottingham's second generation tramway. The first section is north from Ruddington Lane tram stop as far as the River Trent, used by the 2015-opened line 2 of NET. North of the river the Great Central route was eliminated by housing development in the 1970s and the tramway uses a different route across the river and north to Nottingham railway station (the former Midland station). The GCML crossed above this on a bridge, and NET uses the same alignment to provide a tram stop at the station before transitioning back to the city streets. North of here the GCML route is blocked by the Victoria shopping centre, built on the site of the GCR's Nottingham station.

Sections of the GCML around Rotherham are open for passenger and freight traffic, indeed a new station was built there in the 1980s using the Great Central lines which were closer to the town centre than the former Midland Railway station. Commuter EMU trains run from Hadfield to Manchester Piccadilly via Glossop. These are modern trains using 25 kV overhead wires that were installed to replace the 1500 V DC system. Daily steel trains run from Sheffield to Deepcar where they feed the nearby Stocksbridge Steelworks owned by Tata Group.

== Reinstatement ==
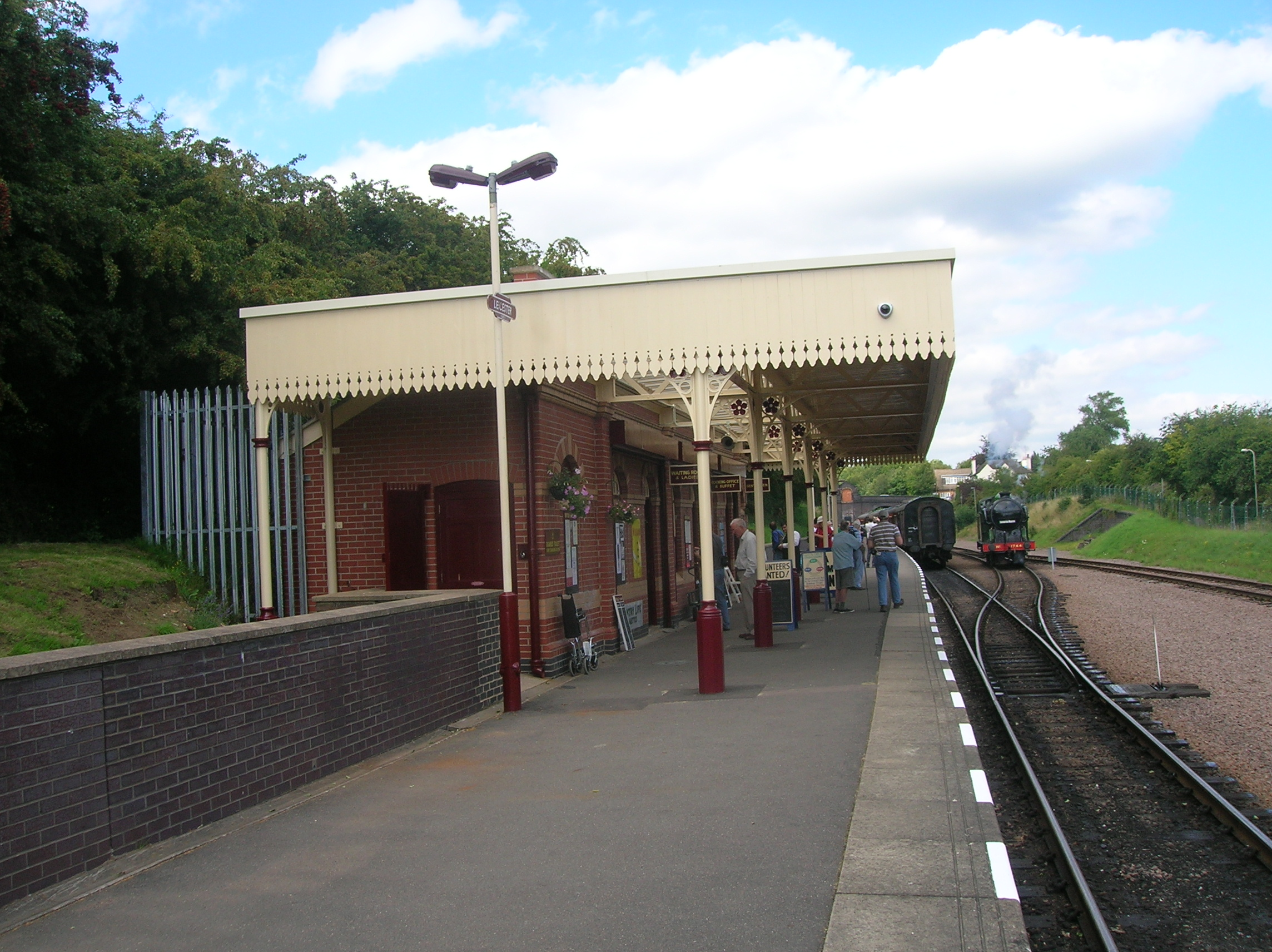
Leicester North station.

Reconstruction of the 500-metre (547 yd) Loughborough Gap is underway which will unite the two surviving preserved sections of the GCR. This will result in an 18-mile (29 km) section of the line from Leicester North station to Ruddington station, south of Nottingham, open for heritage trains. Network Rail were involved in reinstating a bridge taking the Great Central over the Midland Main Line.

== Plans and proposals ==
=== High Speed 2 ===
In March 2010, the government announced plans for a future high-speed railway between London and Birmingham that would reuse about 12 miles of the GCR route. The proposed line would parallel the current Aylesbury line (former Met/GCR joint) corridor and then continue alongside the GCR line between Quainton Road and Calvert. From there it would roughly follow the disused but still extant GCR trackbed via Finmere as far as Mixbury before diverging on a new alignment towards Birmingham.

=== East West Rail ===
Plans to reopen the section of the Great Central north of Aylesbury Vale Parkway have been submitted by Network Rail as part of phase two of the proposed Oxford – Cambridge East–west rail. This would link Aylesbury with Bletchley and Milton Keynes. With consent granted, work could have begun in 2019.

=== Aylesbury to Rugby ===
Chiltern Railways had a long-term plan to reopen the Great Central Main Line north of Aylesbury as far as Rugby and onward at a later stage to Leicester. However, in 2013 Chiltern Railways stated that the plan was "no longer active".

In January 2019, advocacy group the Campaign for Better Transport released a report in which they listed the line between Aylesbury and Rugby (and between Marylebone and Leicester) as Priority 2 for reopening. Priority 2 is for those lines which require further development or a change in circumstances (such as housing developments).

=== Freight and relief line reopening ===
Central Railway Ltd, a company founded in 1991, proposed to re-open the GCR largely as a freight link following the completion of the Channel Tunnel rail link. These proposals faced financial, environmental and social difficulties and were rejected by Parliament twice.

In 2002 the Labour MP for Luton North, Kelvin Hopkins, proposed the re-opening of the GCR as Central Railway, a freight line for a direct container transport connection between northern England and the rest of Europe. He advocated the line's reopening in 2013 as a cheaper alternative to HS2.

In August 2017, a voluntary lobby group (the English Regional Transport Association) proposed that the line between Calvert and Rugby be reopened using the European standard loading gauge. The proposal includes a new stretch bypassing the western side of Rugby and would join the West Coast Main Line. A petition online by ERTA has proposed the line should be reopened all the way to Manchester as it would increase capacity on the network with a loop at Buckingham and new stations at Daventry and Brackley with a link to the East West Rail at Claydon. New sections of track will be required in some areas if this does happen. In October 2017, the group proposed that the line be reopened between Calvert and Rugby for a new relief route from the West Coast Main Line with a new link to Nuneaton.

These proposals have no official recognition and are unfunded.

=== Restoring Your Railway Fund bids ===
In March 2021, two bids were submitted to restore the line from Leicester to Ruddington via East Leake and the line between Rugby and Leicester via Lutterworth, as part of the third round of the Restoring Your Railway fund.

== Sources ==
- Dow, George (1962). Great Central. Vol. 2: Domination of Watkin, 1864–1899. Shepperton: Ian Allan. OCLC 655514941.
- Healy, John (1987). Echoes of the Great Central. Greenwich Editions. ISBN 0-86288-076-9.
