= Great Central Railway (Nottingham) =

Heritage railway in Nottingham, England

Coordinates: 52.887°N 1.162°W

- Locale: Nottingham Transport Heritage Centre, Nottinghamshire, England
- Terminus: Ruddington Fields

Commercial operations
- Built by: Edward Watkin; Manchester, Sheffield and Lincolnshire Railway
- Original gauge: 4 ft 8 1/2 in (1,435 mm) standard gauge

Preserved operations
- Stations: 2
- Length: 10 miles (16 km)
- Preserved gauge: 4 ft 8 1/2 in (1,435 mm) standard gauge

Preservation history
- Headquarters: Nottingham Transport Heritage Centre

Website
- https://gcrn.co.uk/

The Great Central Railway (Nottingham) (formerly known as the Nottingham Heritage Railway) is a heritage railway located at the Nottingham Transport Heritage Centre (NTHC), on the south side of the village of Ruddington, in Nottinghamshire. The route consists of almost 10 miles (16 km) of the former Great Central Main Line from Loughborough South Junction (with the Midland Main Line) to Fifty Steps Bridge and the site of Ruddington's former GCR station, plus a branch line from Fifty Steps Bridge to Ruddington Fields station which is located on a former Ministry of Defence site next to Rushcliffe Country Park.

There are stations open to the public at Ruddington Fields (within the main centre site) and at Rushcliffe Halt. The platform of East Leake station remains but with no plan to re-open it.

The railway is not connected to Great Central Railway (at Loughborough Central in Leicestershire), although there are plans well underway and work has started to reunite the two preserved lines by bridging the Loughborough Gap. This is a major engineering project that is expected to be completed between 2026 and 2028. Some 5 1/2 miles (8.9 km) of the line was used by gypsum trains serving the British Gypsum works at East Leake until early 2020.

== Preservation history ==
After the major part of the GCR main line was closed by British Rail in 1966, a section from Nottingham to Rugby was retained until 1969. Preservationists had hoped to convert that into a live heritage line, but funding was impossible to obtain — except for the length from Loughborough to Belgrave and Birstall, north of Leicester. British Rail decided to maintain rail connection from Loughborough to Ruddington MoD depot until closure and the GCR main line became an unsignalled BR single-track branch. When the Ministry of Defence depot at Ruddington was closed, the 2.77 miles (4.46 km) of track from East Leake to Ruddington was no longer needed by BR. It was also considered that British Gypsum was unlikely to bring in any more bulk materials from coal-fired power stations by rail. The GCR Northern Development Association was formed with the aim of reconnecting the then two GCR sections once again. Work initially concentrated on restoring Rushcliffe Halt, but when Nottinghamshire County Council, which had acquired the whole of the 220 acre MoD site, agreed to lease 12 acres of the former MOD site to the Association, the grand scheme of the Nottingham Transport Heritage Centre was devised to encompass not only railway preservation but any transport heritage relevant to the area.

In the 1990s, work on what had become the Great Central Railway (Nottingham) Ltd was concentrated mainly at Ruddington. The transfer of former BR property to Railtrack and then Network Rail hindered attempts to purchase the line. Ironically, it was British Gypsum's intention to renew rail freight traffic that was the catalyst that allowed the GCR(N) to buy the line and restore it initially for freight use.

At East Leake station, houses were built on the former goods yard in the 1980s and some were built only yards from the remaining track. The disused nature of the line combined with a solicitor's error led the new occupants to believe that the line was closed, but BR had never listed the line as closed and could have resumed operations at any time. However, when the GCR(N) applied for a Transport and Works Act 1992 Order to purchase and operate the line, objections from local residents resulted in a permanent limit on hours of passenger train operation through the former East Leake Station and the station remaining closed.

For Network Rail to route freight trains onto the line during the week and GCR(N) to operate heritage trains at the weekend, a length of rail north of East Leake was removed to create two separate railways. However, because of the 'rail break', the GCR(N) were unable to access Rushcliffe Halt. This has now been updated with an alternative system of work. Despite the full line between Loughborough South Jn and Ruddington being owned by the GCN(N), when the GCR(N) require to operate trains into East Leake or through to Loughborough, possession of the line is taken from Network Rail. Network Rail then lock the line out of use from their end allowing GCR(N) operation through to Loughborough. From 2003, regular services to Rushcliffe Halt resumed. Passenger trains further south continued to run on a regular basis to the proposed "Loughborough High Level", although no station facilities exist here.

In 2021, the "Great Central Railway (Nottingham)" was renamed as the "Nottingham Heritage Railway". This follows the temporary closure of the line after being served with an improvement notice by the Office of Rail and Road in October 2020 for not having an "established a safety management system in relation to the examination, maintenance and repair of structures on their railway infrastructure such as the bridges and Barnstone tunnel." This was followed by public arguments between the groups preserving the two sections of the route of the original Great Central Main Line, and the Great Central Railway sending a solicitor's letter ordering the "Great Central Railway (Nottingham)" to stop using the GCR title due to customer confusion relating to the closure of sections of the "Great Central Railway (Nottingham)". The line remained closed for the 2020 and 2021 seasons.

Following an agreement with the East Midlands Railway Trust in 2023, the railway reverted to using its original name, the "Great Central Railway (Nottingham)", with the aim of getting heritage trains running on the line again.

The line from Ruddington to Rushcliffe Halt reopened to the public on Saturday 30 November 2024 with “The Jingle Bell Express” train.

As of 2025 the line is fully re-opened with trains running to the A60 bridge on special events and Rushcliffe halt on normal running days.

== The railway route ==
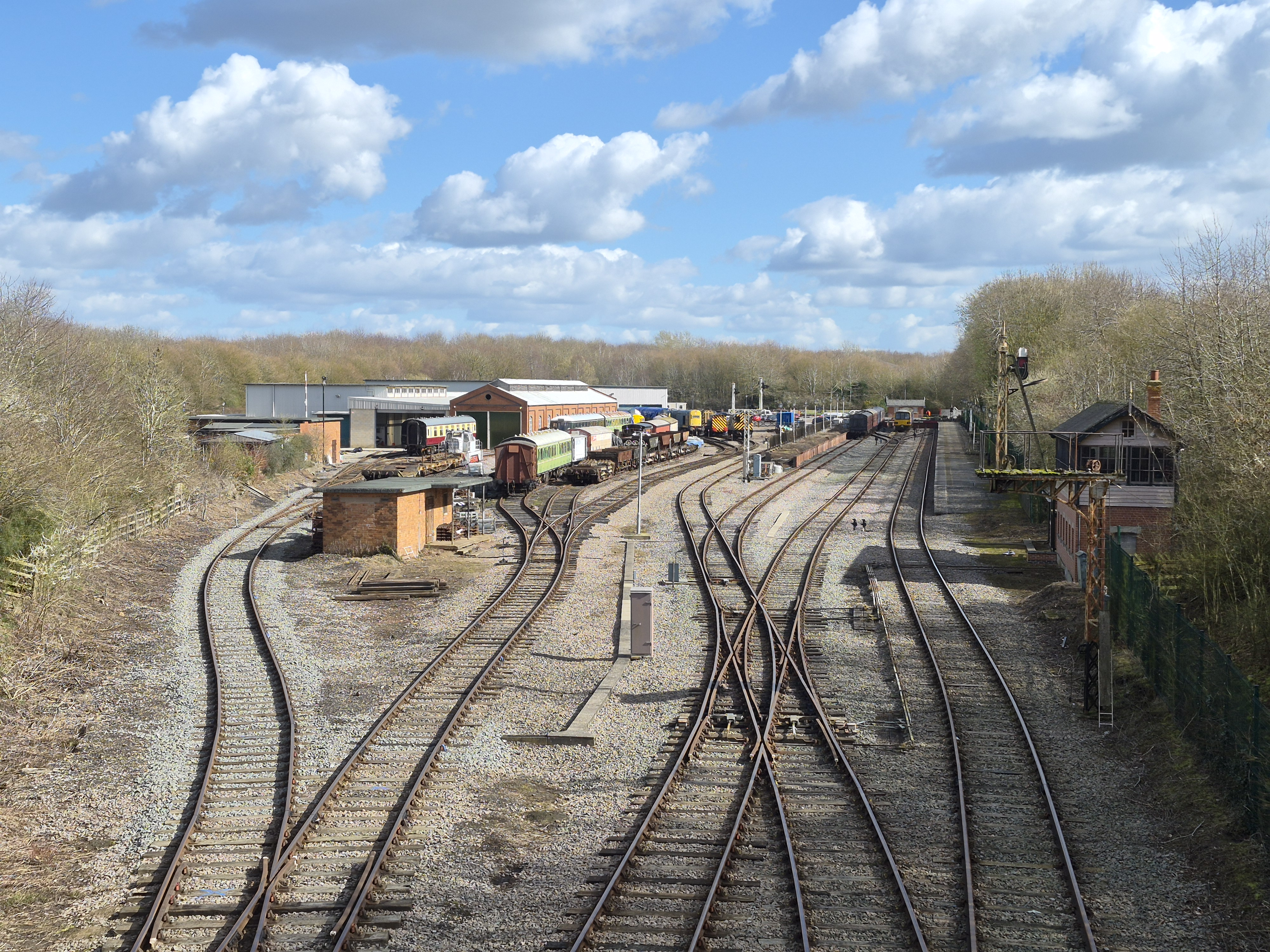
Ruddington Fields Station and Nottingham Transport Heritage Centre

Ruddington Fields is the main station on the line and the home of the Great Central Railway (Nottingham). It has a road transport building, locomotive sheds, GCR signal box (ex Neasden), miniature and model railways and visitor facilities. The Rushcliffe Country Park, created over the balance of the ex MoD site, surrounds the GCRN facilities here. In 2009, a new platform was opened with a second planned.

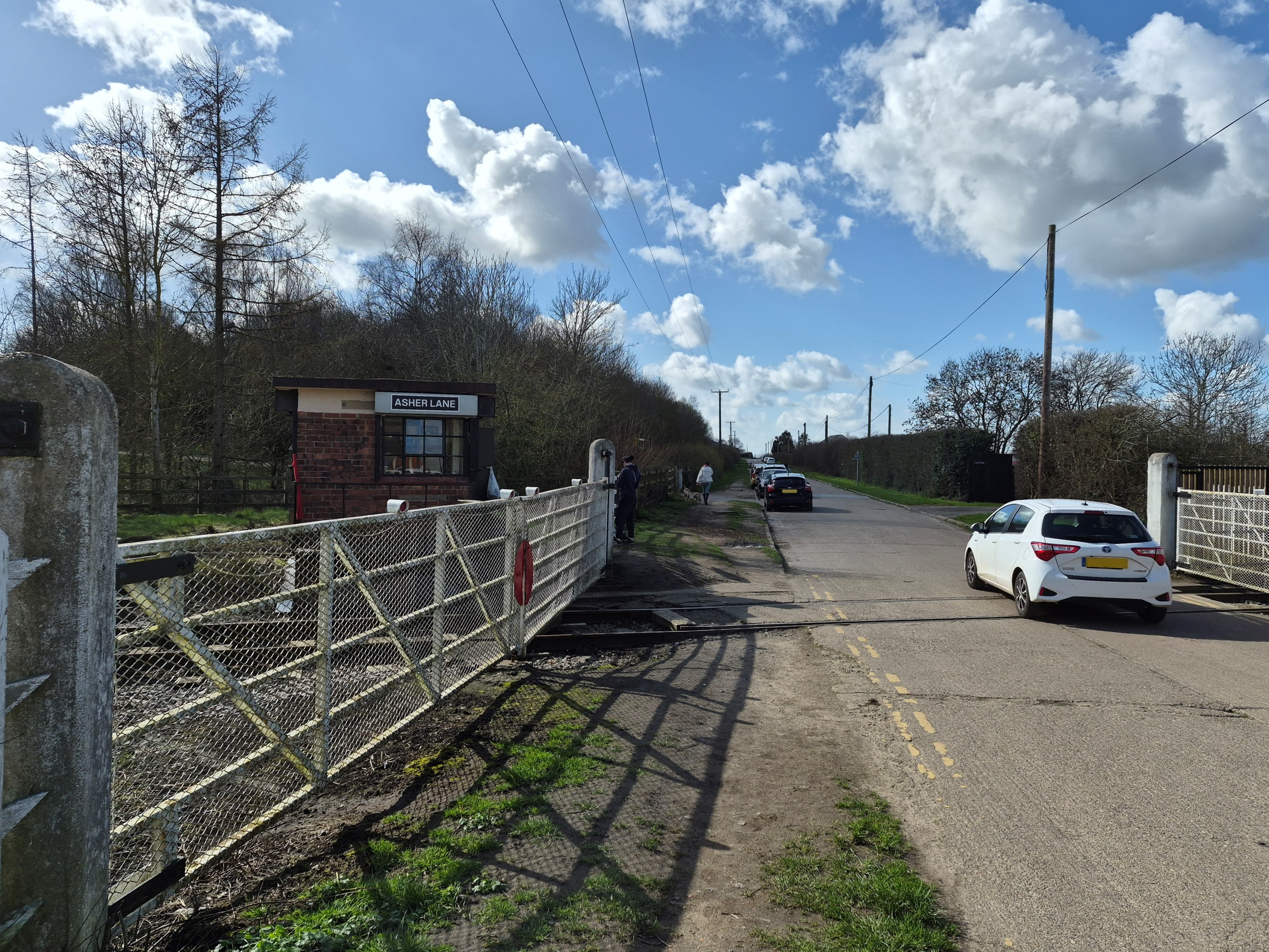
Asher Lane Level Crossing

The gated Asher Lane Crossing is on a private road which was formerly the MOD depot perimeter road. It is a short walk from the Country Park to the crossing, where it is possible to see trains passing and the crossing keeper at work. There was a set of sidings here, called Asher Lane Exchange Sidings, but they have since been removed.

Fifty Steps Bridge is the end of the spur from Ruddington Fields, known as Ruddington South Junction, where trains reverse for the onward journey to Loughborough. The bridge itself originally had 'Fifty Steps' but subsequent modifications have increased that number. The former Ruddington station is further north, however is now overgrown and used as part of a cycle track, the bridge has also been reinforced to accommodate with increased road traffic.

Once on the main line the train passes across Gotham Moor which gives scenic views across the moor before reaching the former Gotham branch-line which was a short, freight branch connected to the Great Central Mainline via Gotham Sidings; it was lifted in 1969. The branch originally served a gypsum mine which was located on the north-western side of the village of Gotham.

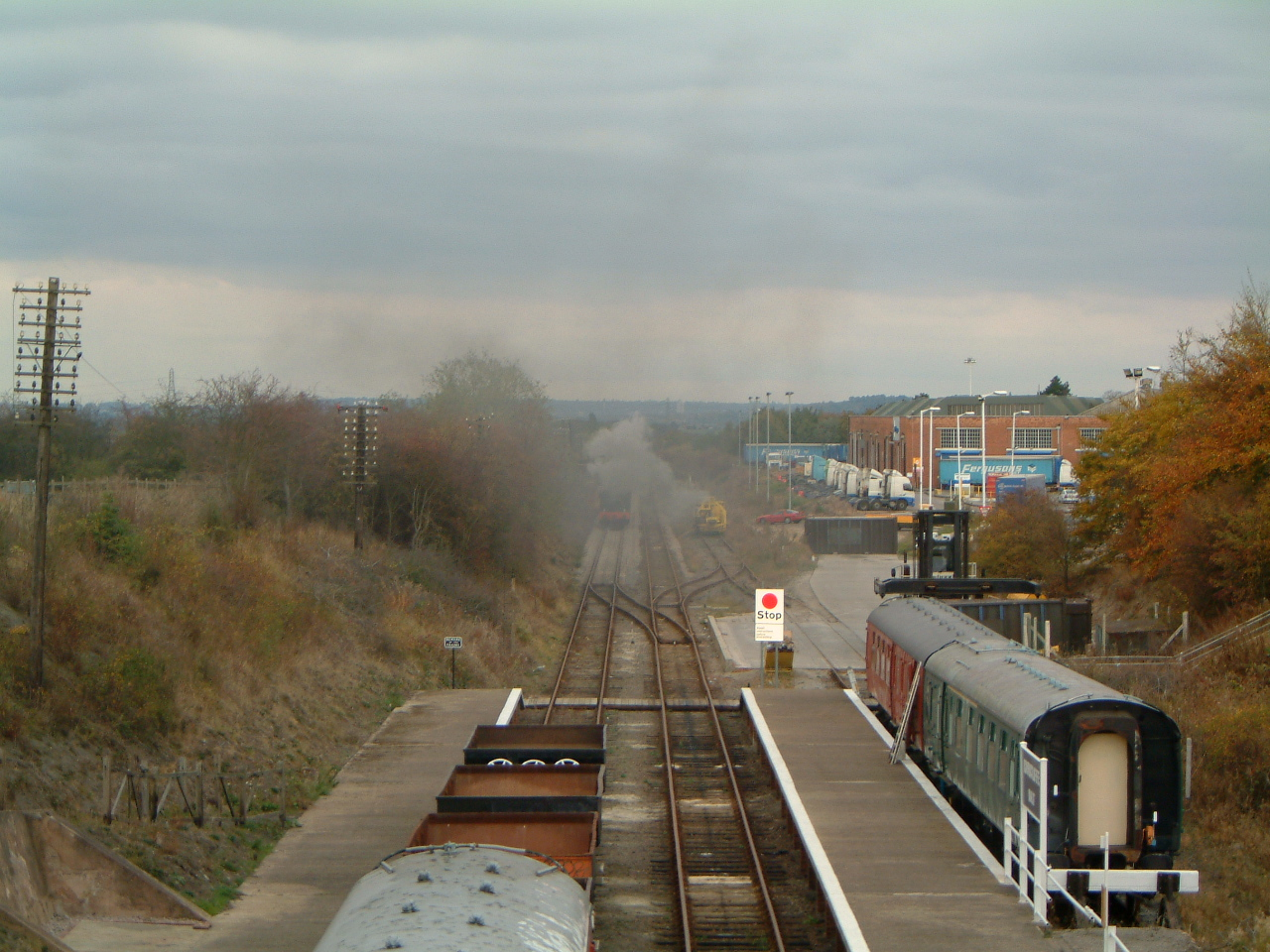
Rushcliffe Halt Station looking north towards Ruddington

Rushcliffe Halt railway station is named after the nearby "Rushcliffe Golf Club". Opened in 1911 it differs from other stations on the London Extension with it being two separate platforms it has been slowly restored and cared for by an increasing group of volunteers from the local area. Just next to the station at Hotchley Hill is the British Gypsum works. An Art Deco LNER signal box (Hotchley Hill) replaced the original GCR structure in the late 1940s when the sidings were extended. It was restored by the Signalling and Telecoms department, which in December 2022 completed a new floor and stove installation. New plans has been drawn up to modernise the track layout in preparation for reunification.

The original station near the centre of the village of East Leake is disused and exists only as an island platform with the stairwell of the station's subway bricked up.

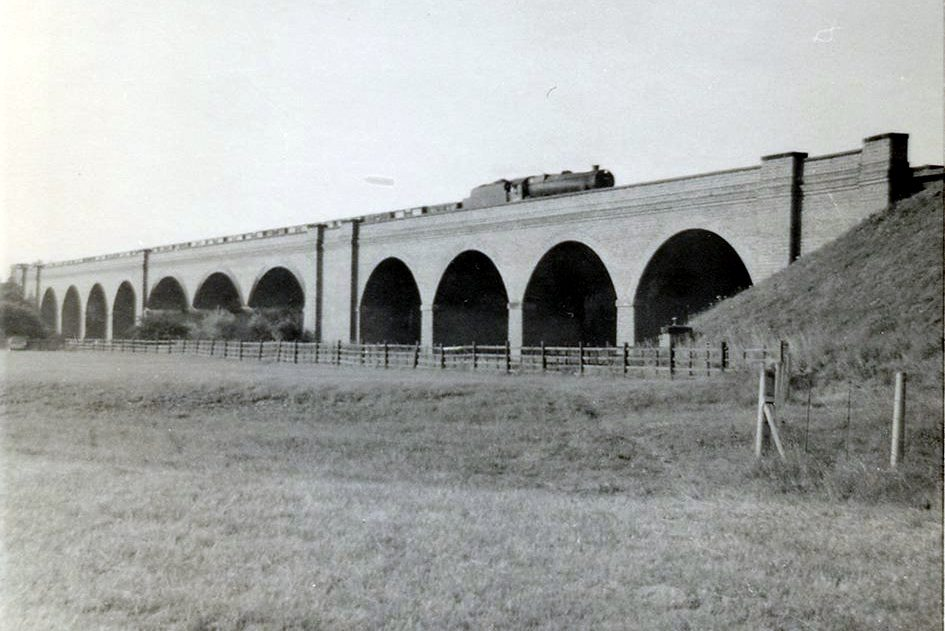
Stanford Viaduct

Barnstone Tunnel (which is 98 yards (90 m) long) is the only tunnel on the preserved line. It was built by the Victorian navvies and was dug out by hand. Located close to the tunnel was another set of sidings, which although removed could be reinstated in the future for extra storage. Between the Tunnel and Loughborough the line follows the ridge forming the Eastern side of the Soar Valley. The railway continues towards Loughborough, passing close to the hamlet of Stanford-on-Soar. The line travels over the River Soar at Stanford Viaduct, close to the Brush works, now part of WABTEC.

GCRN operations terminate at a Stop Board close to the A60 road. Beyond that is the connection to Network Rail and the Midland Main Line (MML) at Loughborough South Junction. The loco sheds of the Great Central Railway at Loughborough are just visible across the MML, about one mile (1.6 km) away. Plans are well under way to reconnect the two halves of the preserved GCR with the new bridge across the MML, the refurbishment of the Grand Union Canal bridge, and more recently, the replacement of the A60 Bridge all completed and fundraising for the next stage underway.

Once the two preserved sections are re-connected (with the bridging of the Loughborough Gap of 500 metres, three bridges and a 440-yard (400 m) embankment), this would extend to a total of over 18 miles (29 km) in length. The GCR is seeking funding for the next two stages the "Factory Flyover" to which over £1.25 million has been raised by donors.

== Railway collection ==
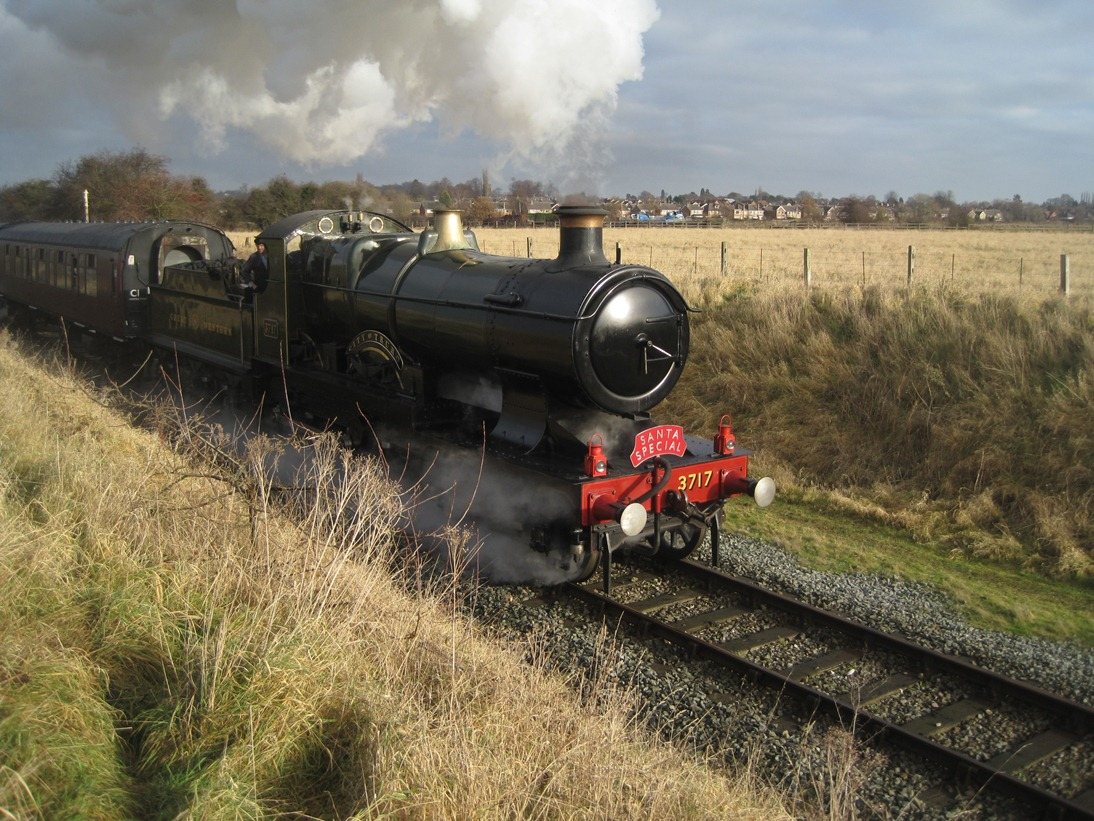
City of Truro, leaves 50 steps junction with a December 2010 Santa Special Service

The railway operates classic steam / diesel hauled services to Rushcliffe Halt and Loughborough. Most trains are run using a heritage DMU, but the resident classic heritage diesel locomotive collection is extensive. The site also houses several Heritage shunters including English Electric Class 08s and Ruston and Hornsby classes.

=== Locomotives ===
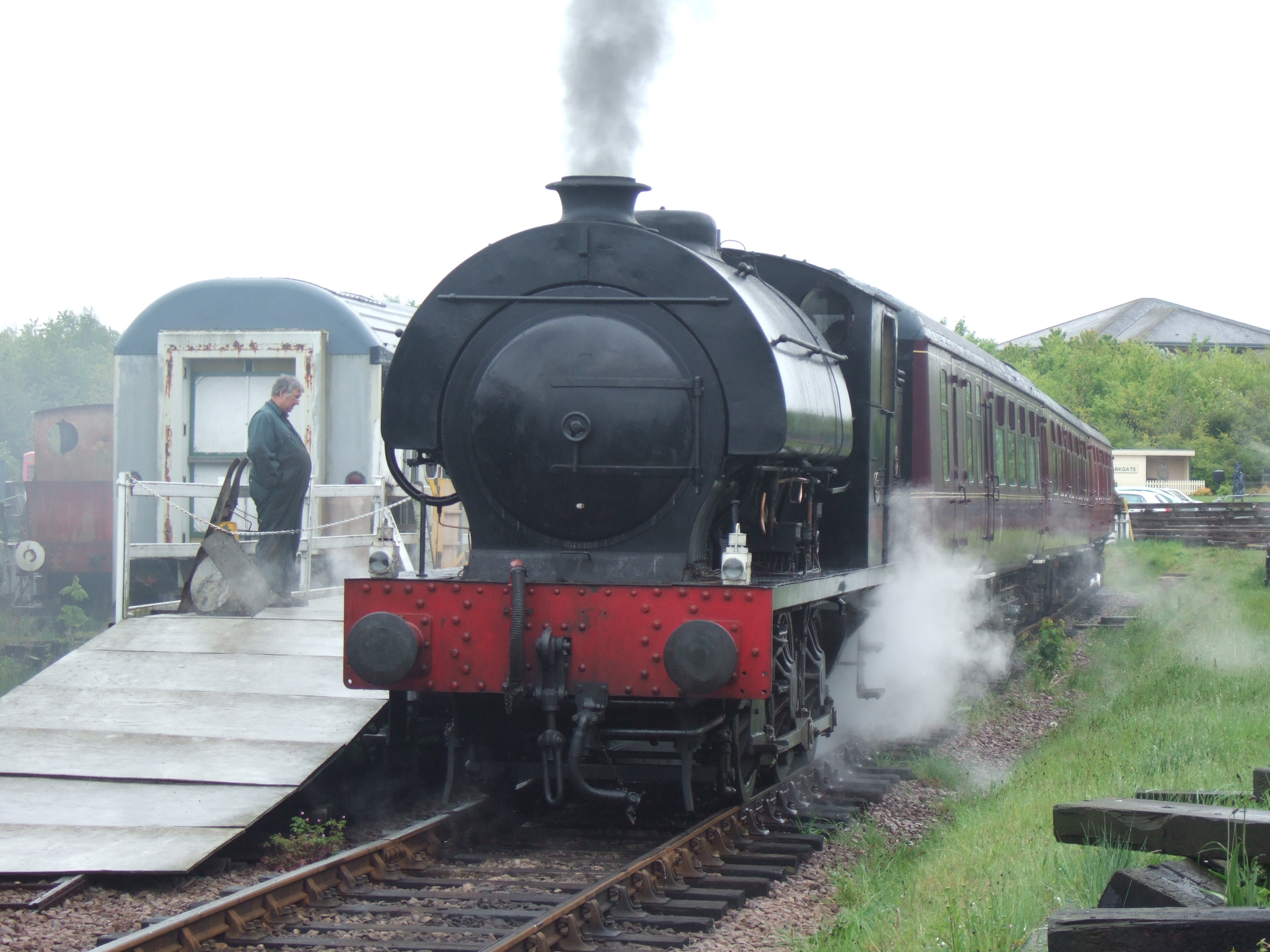
RSH Ugly class 0-6-0ST No. 56 preparing to depart Ruddington with a passenger train in May 2009

==== Steam locomotives ====
- Andrew Barclay 1245 "Carron No.14"
- Manning Wardle 0-6-0ST No. 1762 "Dolobran", built in 1910 Undergoing restoration
- LNER Thompson B1 No.1264, Under Overhaul

==== Main line diesel locomotives ====
- Class 20 Bo-Bo No. 20154. (BR Blue, full yellow ends). Operational.
- Class 31 A1A-A1A No. 31463 (D5830). (BR Golden Ochre). Under Overhaul.
- Class 37 Co-Co No. 37340 (37009). (BR Blue). Undergoing restoration.

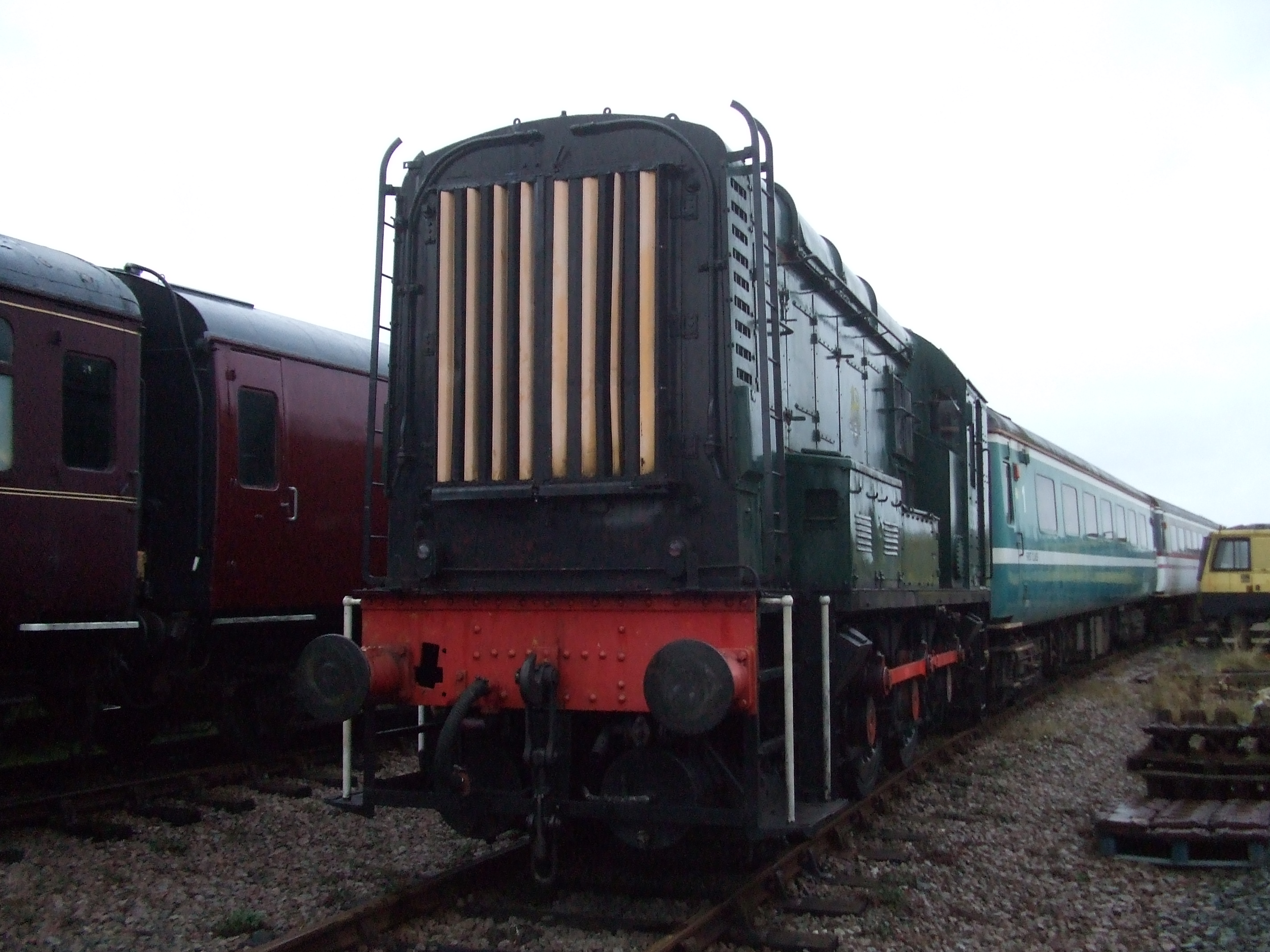
08114, in use at the railway since 1997, in BR Blue livery

==== Diesel Shunters ====
- Ruston and Hornsby 165 0-4-0DE 449754 "Staythorpe 2B" Under overhaul
- Ruston and Hornsby 88DS 263001 "Staythorpe 2A" Operational
- Sentinel 0-6-0DH No. H014 (RMS Locotec Blue). Undergoing repairs prior to entering service.
- Class 03 0-6-0DM No. D2118 (BR Blue). Undergoing overhaul.
- Class 08 0-6-0DE No. 08114 (BR Blue). Operational.
- Class 08 0-6-0DE No. 08220 (BR Blue). Operational.
- Class 08 0-6-0DE No. 08784 (Rail freight Grey). Operational.
- Class 08 0-6-0DE No. 08694 (Rail freight Grey). Operational.

==== Diesel multiple units ====
- BR Class 108 unit 53645+53926. (Blue and Grey) Under restoration.
- BR Class 116 hybrid unit 51138+59501+51151 running with Class 117 (BR Mid-Brunswick DMU Green) Under overhaul.
- BR Class 144 unit 144003

=== Carriages ===
==== BR Mk1 carriages ====
- Mk1 RMB (Restaurant Miniature Buffet) 1811 in lined maroon. (Undergoing overhaul)
- Mk1 CK (Composite Corridor) 16168 in lined maroon livery. (Operational)
- Mk1 CK (Composite Corridor) 16190 in lined maroon livery. (Operational)
- Mk1 TSO (Tourist Standard Open) 4207 in plain maroon livery. (Operational)
- Mk1 RSO (Restaurant Second Open) 1012 later Cinema Coach 150353. (Stored)

==== BR Mk2 carriages ====
- Mk2 BSO (Brake Standard Open) 9389 Operational
- Mk2a TSO 5365 (Stored pending disposal)
- Mk2a TSO 5376 (Stored pending disposal)
- Mk2b TSO 5497 (Stored pending disposal)
- Mk2a BSK 35512 (Stored – overhaul abandoned)

==== GCR Barnum carriages ====
- GCR Barnum dining coach 664. (Stored)
- GCR Barnum brake coach 695. (Stored)
- GCR Barnum Dining coach 666. (Stored) (NOTE: Is the only original GCR coach owned by the National collection)
- GCR Barnum bar coach 228. (Being restored undercover)

==== Other carriages ====
- GCR Clerestory brake coach 1663. (Stored)
- GCR Suburban brake coach 555. (Stored)
- GCR Suburban composite coach 799. (Stored)

==== Non-passenger carrying stock ====
- BR Mk1 GUV (General Utility Van) 86565. (Stored)
- BR Mk1 GUV (General Utility Van) 86129 in lined maroon livery. (Operational)

=== Wagons ===
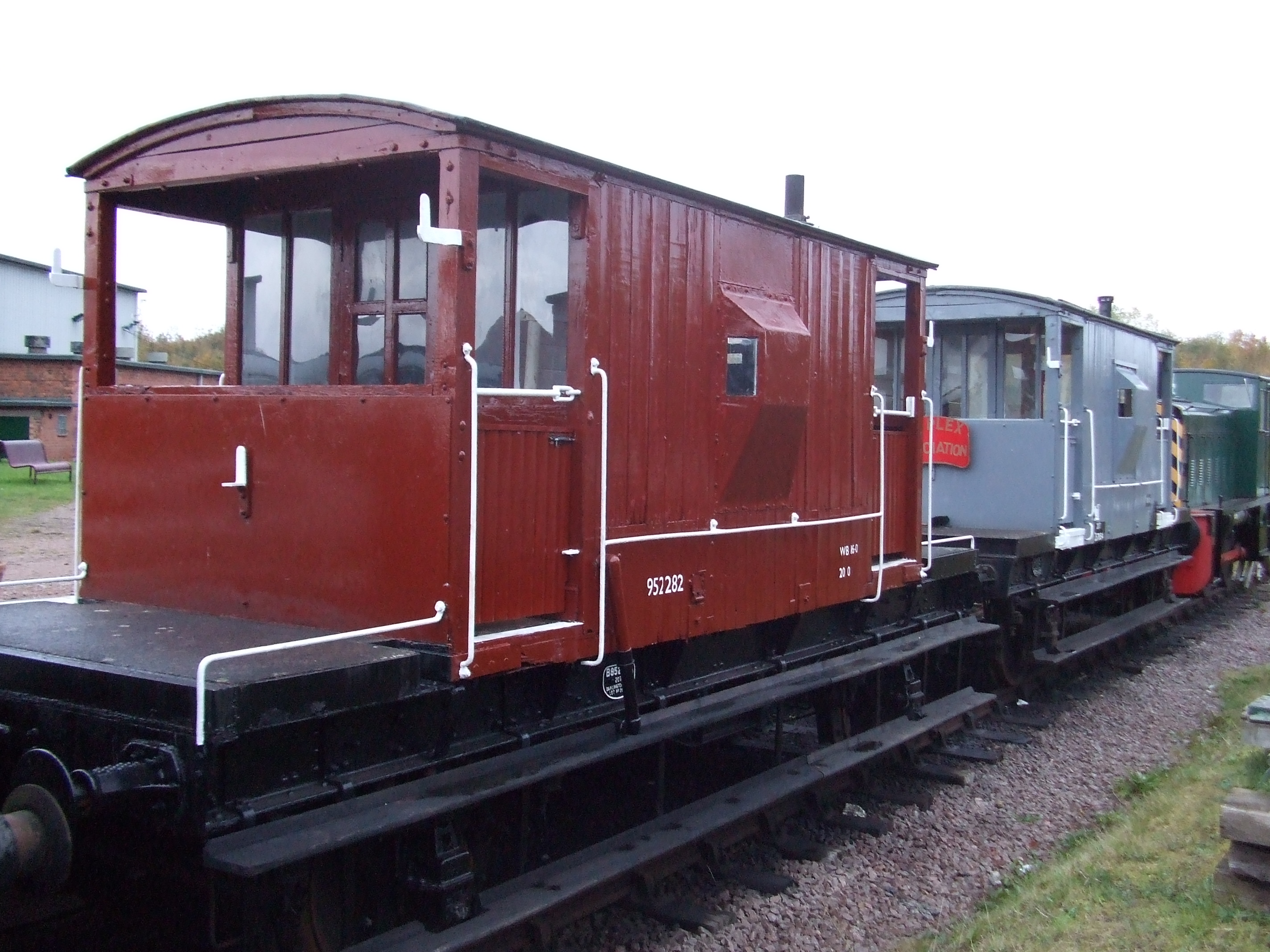
952282 and 287664

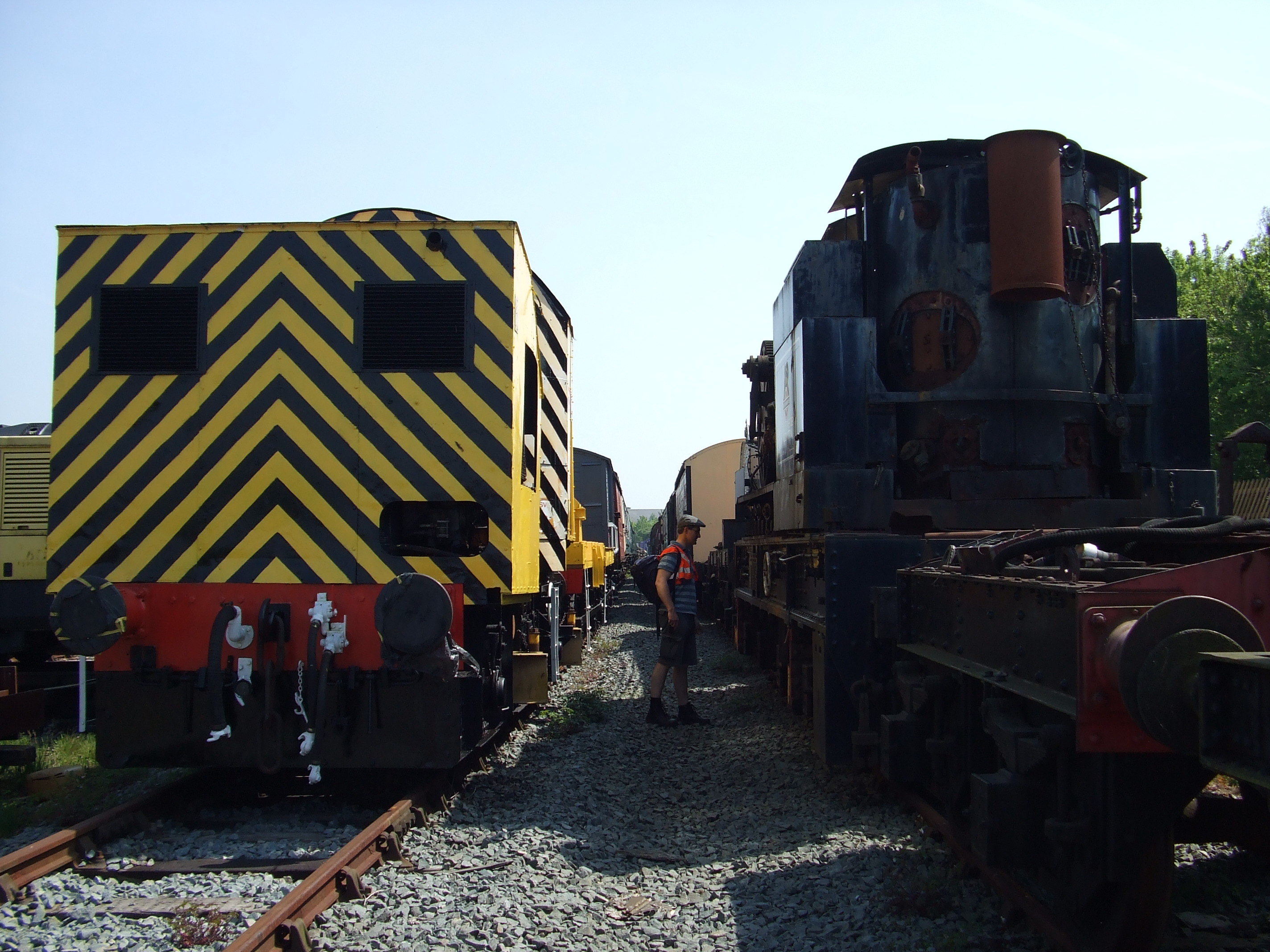
Rail crane 81353 (left) and rail crane 941602 stand together at Ruddington

==== Brake vans ====
- BR 20-ton brake van 952282 built in 1954. (Stored pending overhaul)
- Shark ballast brake van DB993874 (Under Overhaul)
- LMS 20-ton brake van 357771 built in 1927. (Awaiting resumption of overhaul)

==== Vans ====
- BR Palvan 779761 built in 1958. (painted army green)
- BR Widefit 784455 built in 1962. (painted BR Bauxite)
- BR 29-ton VAA 200631 built in 1976.
- BR Palvan 778771 built in 1959. (painted BR Bauxite)
- BR Palvan 776155 built in 1957. (painted army green)
- BR Palvan 782111 built in 1960. (painted army green)
- Railfreight Pressed Steel box van 786902.
- Railfreight Pressed Steel box van 201055.
- BR Ferry van 786902 built in 1962.

==== Ballast wagons ====
- BR Dogfish ballast hopper wagon 993039 built in 1959. (Operational, painted BR Black)
- BR Dogfish ballast hopper wagon 983586 built in 1960. (Operational, painted BR Black)
- BR Dogfish ballast hopper wagon 993597 built in 1959. (Operational, painted BR Black)
- BR Dogfish ballast hopper wagon 993230 built in 1957. (Operational, painted BR Black)
- BR Grampus open wagon 991831 built in 1958. (Operational, painted BR Black)

==== Flat wagons ====
- LMS 50-ton Warwell 721218 built in 1949. (Operational, painted Brown)
- BR Weltrol 900936 built in 1960. (Operational)
- LNER 22-ton Lowmac wagon 230964 (Operational, painted BR Grey)
- BR Bogie bolster wagon 943545 built in 1953. (painted brown)
- BR Bogie rail sturgeon A 994271 built in 1956.
- BR Bogie rail sturgeon A 994770 built in 1953.
- Brake van 900937 built in 1960, a standard gauge well wagon for carrying narrow gauge rolling stock; built 1960

== GCR Rolling Stock Trust ==
A Charity called the GCR Rolling Stock Trust based at the Great Central Railway (Nottingham) owns the third largest (after the Bluebell Railway and Isle of Wight Steam Railway) collection of pre-grouping rolling stock known to exist in the UK, including the famous 'Barnum' carriages (so named as these were the type hired by P.T. Barnum's travelling circus) and some items that even herald from the days of the Manchester, Sheffield and Lincolnshire Railway—the GCR's title before completing the London extension. The details of the stock are below.

- Six Wheeler GCR No 946. At the Mountsorrel & Rothley Heritage Center Museum shed where it is displayed in fully-restored condition.
- Barnum Bar coach No 228 built in 1910. The group's restoration projects.
- Barnum Brake Coach No 695 built in 1910. Awaiting restoration.
- Barnum Open Saloon No 666 built in 1910. Awaiting restoration. Now moved to Swithland Sidings on the other GCR site.
- Barnum Open Saloon No 664 built in 1910. Awaiting restoration.
- Clerestory 1st and 3rd class No 1663. Awaiting restoration.
- Suburban No 799. Outside with good framework and the roof has recently been tarpaulined.
- Suburban GCR Coach No 555. Parted from its frames.
- Six Wheeler No 373 GCR. Stored with poor body and major work needed on the frames.

GCR suburban 1905 No.793, not part of the RST collection but under the wing of the GCR 567 Group is stored at Swithland Sidings — examined and found to be in very poor condition. Placed under a tarpaulin for weather protection.

== Nottingham Area Bus Society ==
Also located at the NTHC is the Nottingham Area Bus Society, which has an extensive collection of restored and maintained vintage buses that originally operated for local bus companies. Bus rides are offered several times a year during vehicle rallies. The bus collection is available to view during the railway's open days.

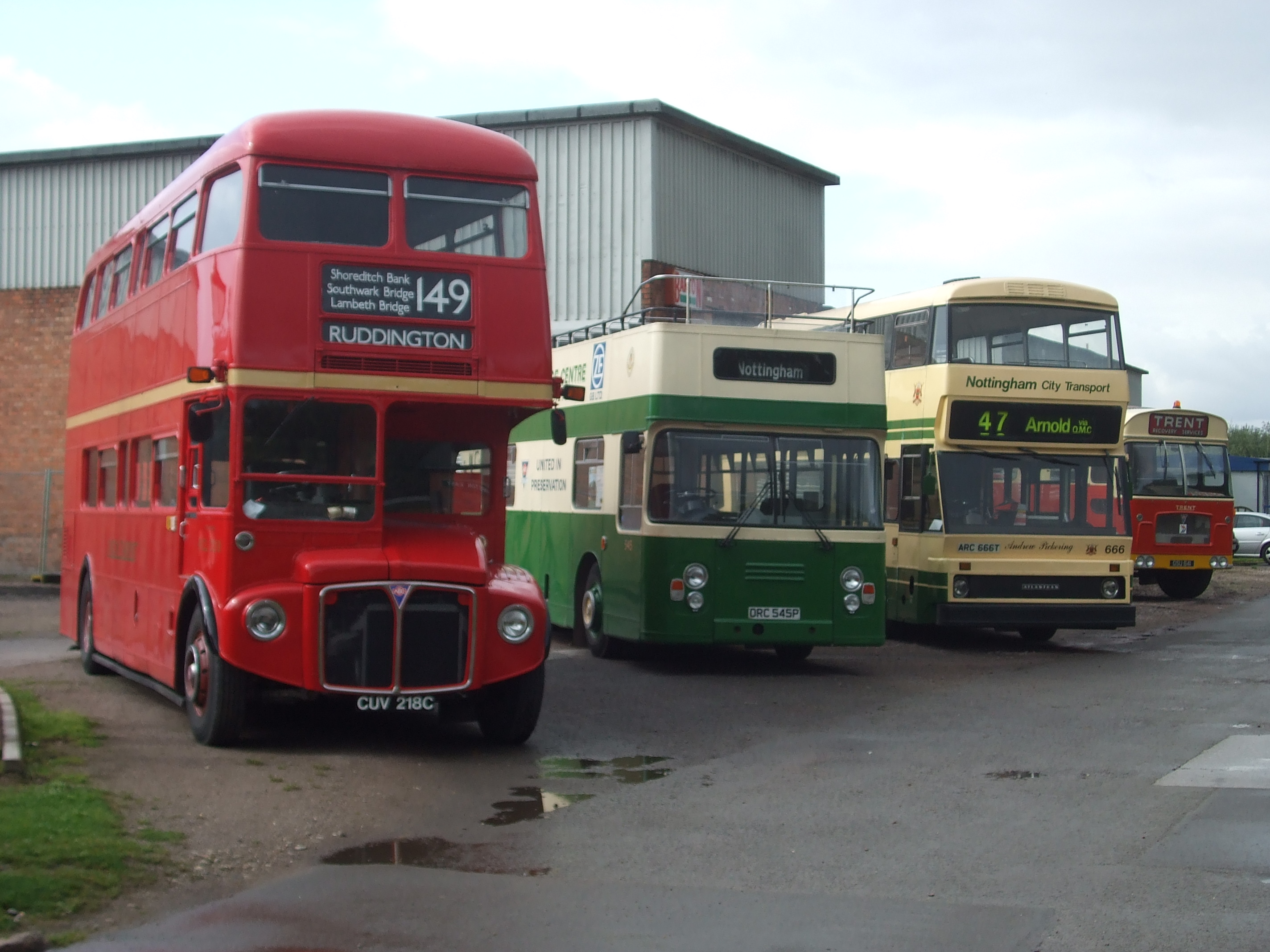
CUV 218C, ORC 545P, ARC 666T and GSU 841 on display

- Operational Vehicles
  - Barton Transport AEC Regent V 854 FNN, built in 1960.
  - Barton Transport Leyland PD1 JVO 230, built in 1947.
  - Barton Transport Leyland PS1/1 WAL 782, built in 1948. (Originally a single-decker, re-bodied as a double-decker when sold to Barton in 1957).
  - Barton Transport Leyland Leopard XRR 615M, built in 1973.
  - Barton Transport Bedford YMT RRR 517R, built in 1976.
  - Nottingham City Transport AEC Regent III OTV 161, built in 1954.
  - Nottingham City Transport Leyland Atlantean ARC 666T, built in 1978.
  - Midland General Bristol MW DNU 20C, built in 1965.
  - Midland General Leyland National XRB 415L, built in 1972.
  - Northern General Leyland Atlantean ORC 545P, built in 1976. (An open-topper. Painted in a Trent red and cream livery).
  - Leicester City Transport Leyland PD1 DJF 349, built in 1946. (Operational but restoration still ongoing).
  - Felix Bus Services Bedford SB1 618 KRA, built in 1959.
- Non-operational Vehicles
  - Barton Transport AEC Reliance DAL 771J, built in 1970. (Under repair).
  - Barton Transport Leyland Leopard HAL 703J, built in 1970. (Undergoing restoration, originally of Tyne Valley with the identity of VTY 543J).
  - Barton Transport Leyland PD1 KNN 254, built in 1949. (Undergoing overhaul).
  - Barton Transport Leyland BTS1 VVO 735, built in 1957. (Undergoing restoration).
  - South Notts Leyland Lion LT5 VO 8846, built in 1933. (Stored in the workshop awaiting restoration).
  - South Notts Leyland Royal Tiger PSU1/11 MAL 310, built in 1951. (Undergoing restoration in the workshop).
  - Trent Buses Volvo Citybus B10M-50 F609 GVO, built in 1989. (Undergoing restoration).
