= Grosse Isle =

Island in the St. Lawrence River in Quebec, Canada

Native name: Grosse Île
- Grosse Isle in Quebec

Geography
- Location: Gulf of Saint Lawrence
- Coordinates: 47°02′N 70°40′W
- Archipelago: 21-Island Isle-aux-Grues archipelago
- Area: 7.7 km^{2} (3.0 sq mi)
- Length: 4.8 km (2.98 mi)
- Width: 1.6 km (0.99 mi)

Administration
- Canada
- Province: Quebec
- Municipality: Saint-Antoine-de-l'Isle-aux-Grues

National Historic Site of Canada
- Official name: Grosse Île and the Irish Memorial National Historic Site
- Designated: 1974

Grosse Isle (French: Grosse Île, pronounced [ɡʁos il], "big island") is an island located in the St. Lawrence River in Quebec, Canada. It is one of the islands of the 21-island Isle-aux-Grues archipelago. It is part of the municipality of Saint-Antoine-de-l'Isle-aux-Grues, located in the Chaudière-Appalaches region of the province.

Also known as Grosse Isle (the famine) and the Irish Memorial National Historic Site, the island was the site of an immigration depot which housed predominantly Irish immigrants coming to Canada to escape the Great Famine of 1845–1849. In 1832, the Lower Canadian Government had previously set up this depot to contain an earlier cholera epidemic that was believed to be caused by the large influx of European immigrants, and the station was reopened in the mid-19th century to accommodate Irish immigrants who had contracted typhus during their voyages. Thousands of Irish were quarantined on Grosse Isle from 1832 to 1848.

It is believed that over 3,000 Irish people died on the island and that over 5,000 are currently buried in the cemetery there; many died en route. Most who died on the island were infected with typhus, a result of poor sanitary conditions there in 1847. Grosse Isle is the largest burial ground for refugees of the Great Famine outside Ireland. After Canadian Confederation in 1867, the buildings and equipment were modernized to meet the standards of the new Canadian government's immigration policies.

Grosse Isle is sometimes referred to as Canada's Ellis Island (1892–1954), an association it shares with the Pier 21 immigration facility in Halifax, Nova Scotia. It is estimated that in total, from its opening in 1832 to its closing in 1932, almost 500,000 Irish immigrants passed through Grosse Isle on their way to Canada.

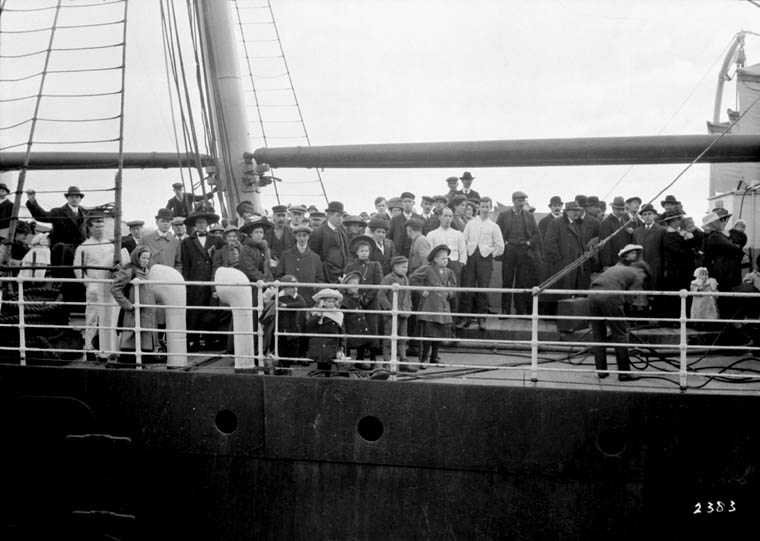
Steamer Lake Champlain arriving at port, Québec, Oct. 1911

== Arrival ==
On arrival at Grosse Isle, immigrant ships were not permitted to sail onwards unless they had assured the authorities that they were free of disease. Those with fever cases on board were required to fly a blue flag. Dr. George Douglas, Grosse Isle's chief medical officer, recorded that by mid-summer the quarantine regulations in force were 'physically impossible' to carry out, making it necessary for the emigrants to stay on board their ships for many days. Douglas believed that washing and airing out the ships would be enough to stop the contagion spreading between infected passengers.

Robert Whyte, pseudonymous author of the 1847 Famine Ship Diary: The Journey of a Coffin Ship, described how on arrival at Grosse Isle the Irish emigrant passengers on the Ajax dressed in their best clothes and helped the crew to clean the ship, expecting to be sent either to hospital or on to Quebec after their long voyage. In fact, the doctor inspected them only briefly and did not return for several days. By mid-summer doctors were examining their charges very perfunctorily, allowing them to walk past and examining the tongues of any who looked feverish. In this way, many people with latent fever were allowed to pass as healthy, only to succumb to their sickness once they had left Grosse Isle.

On 28 July 1847, Whyte recorded the neglect of his fellow passengers, who 'within reach of help' 'were to be left enveloped in reeking pestilence, the sick without medicine, medical skill, nourishment, or so much as a drop of pure water'. However, conditions on other Irish emigrant ships were still worse. Two Canadian priests who visited the Ajax described the holds of other vessels where they had been 'up to their ankles in filth. The wretched emigrants crowded together like cattle and corpses remain[ed] long unburied'. Whyte contrasted this with the condition of German immigrants arriving at Grosse Isle. These were all free of sickness, 'comfortably and neatly clad, clean and happy'. The Times also commented on the 'healthy, robust and cheerful' Germans.

The exact numbers of those who died at sea is unknown, although Whyte himself estimated it at 5,293. During the crossing itself, bodies were thrown into the sea, but once the ships had reached Grosse Isle they were kept in the hold until a burial on land became possible. The dead were dragged out of the holds with hooks and 'stacked like cordwood' on the shore. On July 29, 1847, Whyte described 'a continuous line of boats, each carrying its freight of dead to the burial ground... Some had several corpses so tied up in canvas that the stiff, sharp outline of death was easily traceable'.

Even those passengers who escaped typhus and other diseases were weakened by the journey. The Senate Committee of the United States on Sickness and Mortality in Emigrant Ships described the newly disembarked emigrants as 'cadaverous' and 'feeble'. Most had been misled by passage-brokers into believing that they would be provided with food on the ship.

== Accommodation ==
Before the 1847 crisis, invalids were placed in hospitals while the healthy carried out their quarantine periods in sheds. However, in 1847 the island was quickly overwhelmed. Tents were set up to house the influx of people, but many new arrivals were left lying on the ground without shelter. Robert Whyte records seeing 'hundreds... literally flung on the beach, left amid the mud and stones to crawl on the dry land as they could'. The Anglican Bishop of Montreal, Bishop Mountain, recalled seeing people lying opposite the church screaming for water, while others lay inside the tents without bedding. One child he saw was covered in vermin; another who had 'been walking with some others, sat down for a moment, and died'. Many children were orphaned.

Accommodation was found in the sheds, which were filthy and crowded, with patients lying in double tiers of bunks which allowed dirt from the top bunk to fall onto the lower. According to the Senate Committee's report, two or three invalids would be placed together in one berth, irrespective of age or sex. There was no bread: meals consisted of tea, gruel or broth served three times a day. As drinking water was carted, there was never enough for the fever patients. One Catholic priest, Father Moylan, reported giving water to invalids in a tent who had not been able to drink for 18 hours. The sheds were not originally intended to house fever patients and had no ventilation; new sheds were built without privies. The Senate Committee stated that because of the lack of personnel and space, the invalids lay in their own excrement for days and there were insufficient staff to take away those who died during the night. The hospitals themselves had very little equipment and planks for bedding were not always available, meaning that it was spread on the ground and became soaked.

At Quebec, the French and English speaking Catholic clergy ministered to the discharged emigrants and convalescents brought from the island. Father McMahon, founder of St. Patrick's Church (Quebec City), took a leading part in organizing relief to the sufferers and orphans of that awful period.

== Personnel ==
As well as a shortage of accommodation, there was a serious lack of doctors. Dr. Douglas attempted to enlist nurses and doctors from among the healthy female passengers with the promise of high wages, but fear of disease meant none accepted. Nurses were expected to sleep alongside the sick and share their food; they had no privacy, often caught the fever themselves and were not helped when they fell ill. Prisoners from the local jail were released to carry out the nursing, but many stole from the dead and the dying. All of the medical officers involved became ill at some stage, with four doctors dying of typhus. Under the Passengers Act 1842, ships were not obliged to carry a doctor, and only two doctors arrived as passengers. One of these was a Dr. Benson from Dublin, a man with experience working in fever hospitals in Ireland. He arrived on May 21, volunteered to help the sick, contracted typhus himself and was dead within six days.

More than forty Irish and French Canadian priests and Anglican clergymen were active on Grosse Isle, many becoming ill themselves. The Chief Pastor, Bishop Power, contracted fever and died after delivering the last sacraments to a dying woman in September. The Mayor of Montreal, John Easton Mills, also died in the course of caring for the sick.

== Fate of immigrants after Grosse Isle ==
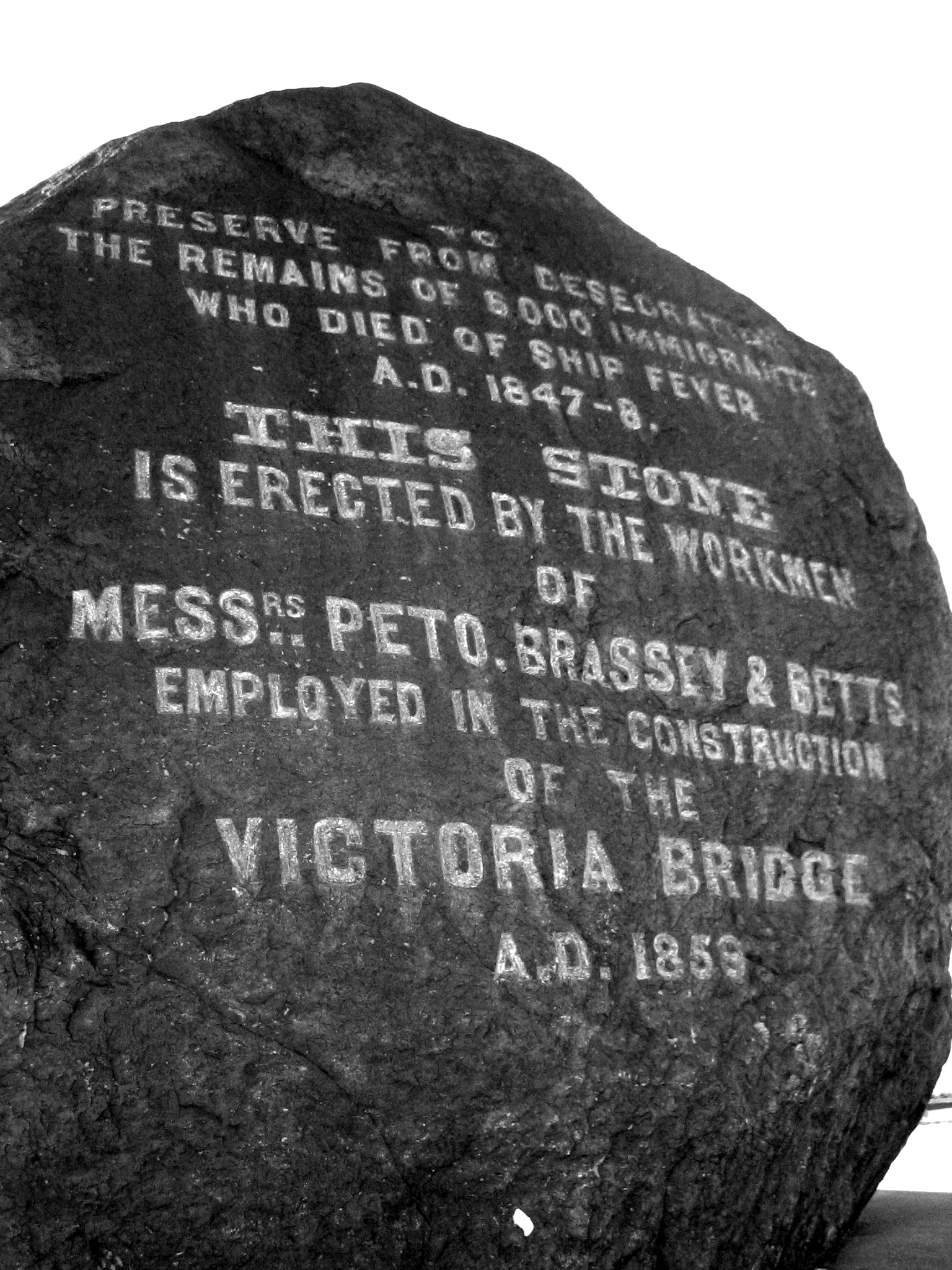
The Black Rock, on the island of Montreal

Many immigrants who passed the perfunctory quarantine checks at Grosse Isle fell sick soon afterwards. Some died in the camp for the 'healthy' tents on the eastern side of Grosse Isle. When a priest, Father O'Reilly, visited this area in August, he gave the last rites to fifty people. In the week leading up to August 18 alone, 88 deaths occurred among the 'healthy'.

On June 8, Dr. Douglas warned the authorities of Quebec and Montreal that an epidemic was about to strike. On the previous Sunday between 4,000 and 5,000 'healthy' had left Grosse Isle, of whom Dr. Douglas estimated two thousand would develop fever within three weeks. Thousands were being discharged into Montreal, weak and helpless, some crawling because they could not walk, others 'lying on the wharves, dying'. Immigrants in Quebec were described as 'emaciated objects' huddled 'in the doors of churches, the wharves and the streets, apparently in the last stages of disease and famine'.

From 1847 to 1848, an estimated 3,000 to 6,000 Irish died from ship fever in fever sheds set up at Windmill Point in Montreal. Their remains were discovered in 1859 by workers building the Victoria Bridge, who erected the Black Rock memorial in their honour. Its inscription reads:

"To preserve from desecration the remains of 6000 immigrants who died of ship fever A.D.1847-8 this stone is erected by the workmen of Messrs. Peto, Brassey and Betts employed in the construction of the Victoria Bridge A.D.1859."

Other cities, including Kingston and Toronto, were anxious to push immigrants on. Whyte recorded seeing one family sheltering under boards by the side of the road and commented that 'there is no means of learning how many of the survivors of so many ordeals were cut off by the inclemency of a Canadian winter'.

One immigrant who did survive was the grandfather of Henry Ford, founder of the Ford Motor Company.

== Memorials ==
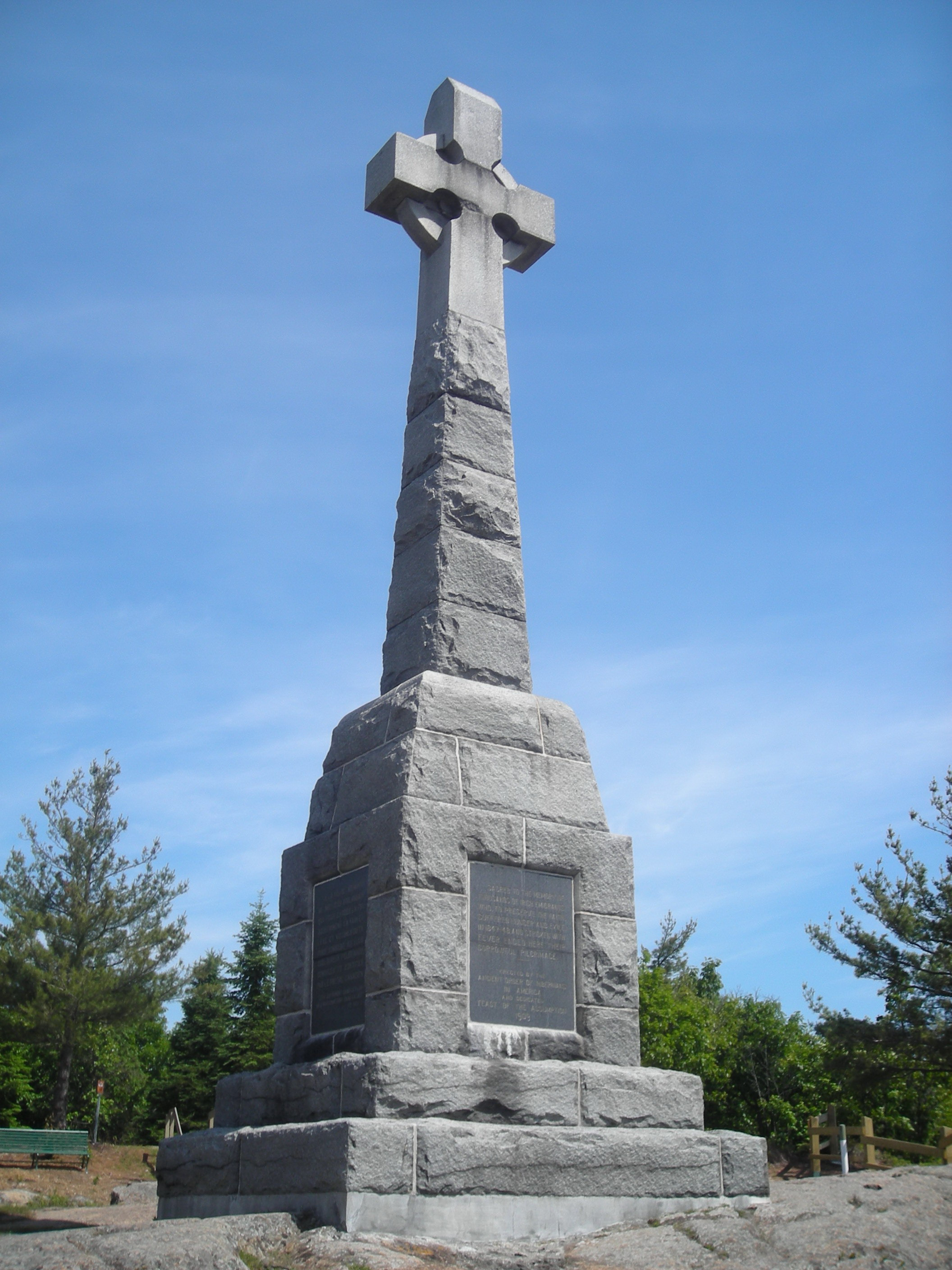
1909 Celtic Cross.

A national memorial, the Celtic Cross, was unveiled on site on August 15, 1909. Designed by Jeremiah O'Gallagher, Country President of the Ancient Order of Hibernians at the time, the monument is the largest of its kind in North America. In 1974, the government of Canada declared the island a National Historic Site. A memorial was erected on the island in 1997.

== Timeline of the 1847 crisis ==
This timeline has been derived from Cecil Woodham-Smith's work The Great Hunger: Ireland 1845-1849, first published by Hamish Hamilton in 1962.

=== February ===
On February 19, the medical officer in charge of the quarantine station at Grosse Isle, Dr George M. Douglas, requested £3,000 to assist with an expected influx of Irish immigrants. He was granted £300, a small steamer and permission to hire a sailing vessel for not more than £50.

=== March ===
Quebec citizens petitioned Earl Grey, Secretary of State for the Colonies, to take action in the face of the expected rise in immigration.

=== April ===
The Colonial Land and Emigration Commissioners published their seventh report without any mention of the approaching crisis.

=== May ===
Chief Emigration Officer Alexander Carlisle Buchanan failed to report concerns to the Canadian government because it was "not within the control of [his] department".

Dr. Douglas, believing 10,600 emigrants had left Britain for Quebec since April 10, requested £150 for a new fever shed. The authorities promised him £135. Preparations were made for 200 invalids.

On May 17 the first vessel, the Syria, arrived with 430 fever cases. This was followed by eight more ships a few days later. Dr Douglas wrote that he had 'not a bed to lay [the invalids] on... I never contemplated the possibility of every vessel arriving with fever as they do now'. One week later seventeen more vessels had appeared at Grosse Isle. By this time, 695 people were already in hospital. Only two days afterwards the number of vessels reached thirty, with 10,000 immigrants now waiting to be processed. By May 29, a total of 36 vessels had arrived. The end of May saw forty ships forming a line two miles (approx. 3 km) long down the St. Lawrence River. According to Dr Douglas, each one was affected by fever and dysentery. 1100 invalids were accommodated in sheds and tents, or laid out in rows in the church.

Due to the lack of space on Grosse Isle, Dr. Douglas required healthy passengers to stay on ship for fifteen days once the sick had been removed, by way of quarantine. Infection flourished on board the ships. One ship, the Agnes, reached Grosse Isle with 427 passengers of whom only 150 survived the quarantine period.

=== June ===
On June 1, the Catholic archbishop of Quebec contacted all Catholic bishops and archbishops in Ireland, asking them to discourage their diocesans from emigrating. Despite this, of the 109,000 emigrants who had left for British North America, almost all were Irish.

On June 5, 25,000 Irish immigrants were quarantined on Grosse Isle itself or waiting in the ships anchored nearby.

=== July ===
By mid-summer 2500 invalids were quarantined on Grosse Isle, and the line of waiting ships stretched several miles. At the end of the month, Dr. Douglas abandoned the quarantine regulations because they were 'impossible' to enforce. His new instructions were that the healthy would be released after a cursory check by the doctor.

=== October ===
Ice blocks the St. Lawrence and immigration ceases.

In summary for the year of 1847, 89,738 Irish emigrants embarked from ports in the United Kingdom. 5,293 of those died on the journey, 3,452 died at the quarantine station at Grosse Isle, 1,041 at the Quebec Emigrant Hospital. 1,965 at the Kingston and Toronto Emigrant Hospital, equating to an overall death toll of 15,330.

In total 17% of all passengers that embarked from Ireland either died at sea, quarantine or emigrant hospital. One-third of those who arrived in Canada were received into a hospital.

== 1848 to the present ==
This information was taken from Île of Irish Tears, an article appearing in the Toronto Star on 2 May 1992.

1862: A total of 59 casualties die on the island, 34 from typhus. Medical improvements, the abandonment of slow-sailing ships in favour of steam ships and tougher quarantine regulations helped slow the spread of disease.

1870 - 1880: Only 42 deaths are reported on Grosse Isle during this decade.

1880 - 1932: Grosse Isle continues to act as a quarantine station against typhus, cholera, beriberi, smallpox and bubonic plague.

1909: The Ancient Order of Hibernians in America set up a Celtic cross with inscriptions in Irish, English and French, in memory of those who died during 1847 and 1848.

1932: Grosse Isle ceases to be a quarantine station. By this time, immigrants are arriving at many different ports and the city hospitals are capable of dealing with them.

1939 - 1945 (approx): Used by the Department of National Defence to research bacteriological warfare, including the manufacture of anthrax.

1956: Taken over by Agriculture Canada for quarantining animals.

1974: Declared a National Historic Site by the Canadian government.

1993: Grosse Isle becomes a national historic park operated by Parks Canada.

1997: A memorial is erected in memory of those who died on the island.

== Irish Memorial National Historic Site ==
Visitors can tour many of the buildings used for the immigrants and by the islanders. The disinfection building features the original showers, waiting rooms and steam disinfection apparatus, as well as a multimedia exhibit about the island's history. A walking trail or trolley are available for visits of the village and hospital sector, including the 1847 lazaretto (quarantine station), Catholic chapel, Anglican chapel, the superintendent's gardens, the eastern wharf and a transport museum. In season, costumed interpreters portray various islanders, such as the quarantine station's staff, the nurse, Catholic priest, carter and school teacher.

The lazaretto features an exhibit about the tragic experiences of the immigrants in 1847.

A walking trail leads to the Celtic cross and the Irish Memorial, which honours the memory of the immigrants, the employees of the quarantine station, the sailors, the doctors and the priests who perished on this island.

Grosse Île and the Irish Memorial National Historic Site were twinned on May 25, 1998, with the National Famine Museum in Strokestown, Ireland.

== Historical publications ==
1. Mariages de St-Luc, Grosse-Île - 1834-1937 (Montmagny), compiled by abbé Armand Proulx, Éditions Bergeron & Fils enr, 1976, 10 pages.(in French)
