= Gilmorton =

Village in Leicestershire, England

Coordinates: 52.4861°N 1.1583°W

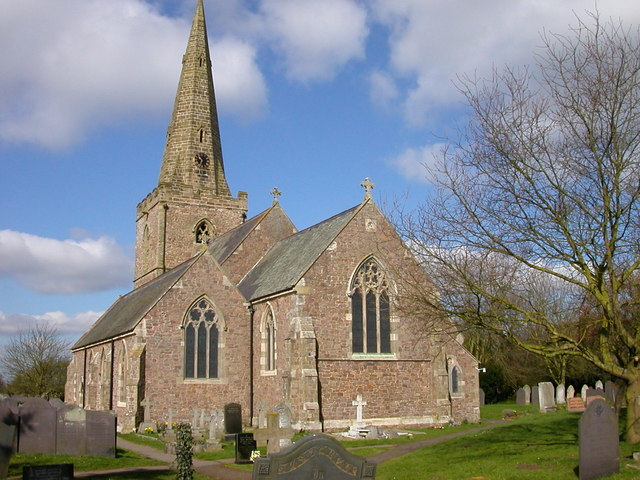
- All Saints' parish church

- Location within Leicestershire
- Population: 976 (2011 Census)
- OS grid reference: SP5787
- Civil parish: Gilmorton
- District: Harborough
- Shire county: Leicestershire
- Region: East Midlands
- Country: England
- Sovereign state: United Kingdom
- Post town: Lutterworth
- Postcode district: LE17
- Dialling code: 01455
- Police: Leicestershire
- Fire: Leicestershire
- Ambulance: East Midlands
- UK Parliament: South Leicestershire
- Website: Gilmorton Parish Council

Gilmorton is a village and civil parish about 3 miles (5 km) northeast of Lutterworth in Leicestershire, England. The 2011 Census recorded a parish population of 976.

== Manor ==
The Domesday Book of 1086 records the village, when its population was about 140. The toponym may be derived from Old English: gilden (or gylden) meaning "golden", and morton, "town on the moor".

In 1303, Roger de Martivall was permitted to alienate land and property at Noseley, Gilmorton, and Stretton to create an income for four chaplains at a chantry chapel at Noseley.

== Parish church ==
The Church of England parish church of All Saints has a 14th- and 15th-century tower, but it and its spire were rebuilt in 1909. The nave, aisles and chancel were rebuilt in 1860–61, and the south porch was built in 1897. Burlison and Grylls made the stained glass for the east window of the chancel in 1878. Shrigley and Hunt made the stained glass for the Lady Chapel in 1896. Kempe and Kempe made all the other stained glass for the church between 1884 and 1906. All Saints' is a Grade II* listed building.

The west tower has a ring of eight bells. Thomas I Eayre of Kettering cast the sixth bell in 1738 and the tenor in 1749. Joseph Eayre of St Neots, Huntingdonshire, cast the fourth bell in 1766. John Taylor & Co of Loughborough cast the seventh bell in 1861, the fifth bell in 1871, and the treble, second, and third bells in 1909 when the tower was rebuilt.

== Economic and social history ==
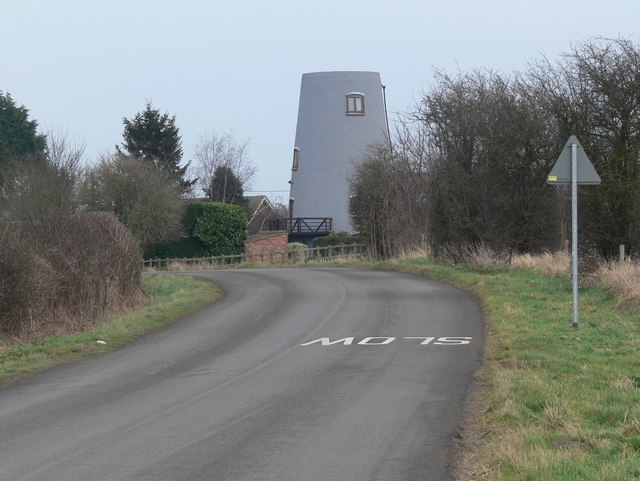
The remains of Gilmorton Mill

Gilmorton Inclosure Act 1777
- Act of Parliament
- Parliament of Great Britain
- Long title: An Act for dividing and enclosing the Open and Common Fields, and Commonable Grounds, within the Parish of Gilmorton, in the County of Leicester.
- Citation: 17 Geo. 3. c. 122 Pr.
- Territorial extent: Great Britain

Dates
- Royal assent: 16 May 1777
- Commencement: 31 October 1776 (Note: Start of session.)

Status: Current legislation

The Gilmorton Inclosure Act 1777 (17 Geo. 3. c. 122 Pr.) enclosed common land in the parish.

A tower mill at Gilmorton was built early in the 19th century. The brick tower survives and has been restored, but neither the cap nor any machinery survives.

In the 1890s, the Great Central Main Line from Nottingham Victoria south to London Marylebone was built through the west of Gilmorton parish, passing 1 1/4 miles (2 km) west of the village. It opened in 1899, with the nearest station being at Ashby Magna 2 1/2 miles (4 km) northwest of the village, and Lutterworth railway station slightly further away to the southwest.

In 1942, RAF Bruntingthorpe was opened just east of the parish. In 1953, its main runway was extended by 4,800 feet (1,500 m), bringing it into Gilmorton parish and within 1/4 mile (400 m) of the village. The air station was decommissioned in 1962, sold for civilian use in 1965, and is now Bruntingthorpe Aerodrome.

The M1 motorway extension from Crick, Northamptonshire, north to Leeds was built parallel with the Great Central Main Line and just east of it, starting in 1965 and opening in 1968. A 1963 The Reshaping of British Railways report recommended that British Railways close the railway, which it did in 1969.

== Amenities ==
Gilmorton has three pubs: the Crown Inn, the Grey Goose, and Mortons, as well as a Village Hall, and a combined Village Store, Post Office, and Tea Room.

Gilmorton Chandler Church of England primary school serves Gilmorton and six neighbouring parishes.

== Sources and further reading ==
- Bloxsom, M (1914). Records of the Family of Woodcock of Gilmorton, Leicestershire, and Connections. Privately published.
- Bloxsom, M (1916). Records of the Family of Bloxsom of Gilmorton, Co. Leicester. Privately published.
- Bloxsom, M (1918). A History of the Parish of Gilmorton in the County of Leicester. Privately published.
- McKinley, R.A. (1954). "The College of Noseley". In Hoskins, W.G. (ed.). A History of the County of Leicestershire. Victoria County History. Vol. 2. London: Oxford University Press for the University of London Institute of Historical Research. pp. 46–48.
- Pevsner, Nikolaus; Williamson, Elizabeth; Brandwood, Geoffrey (1984) [1960]. Leicestershire and Rutland. The Buildings of England. Harmondsworth: Penguin Books. p. 161. ISBN 0-14-071018-3.
