= Goose Village =

- Former Neighborhood of Montreal
- Victoriatown
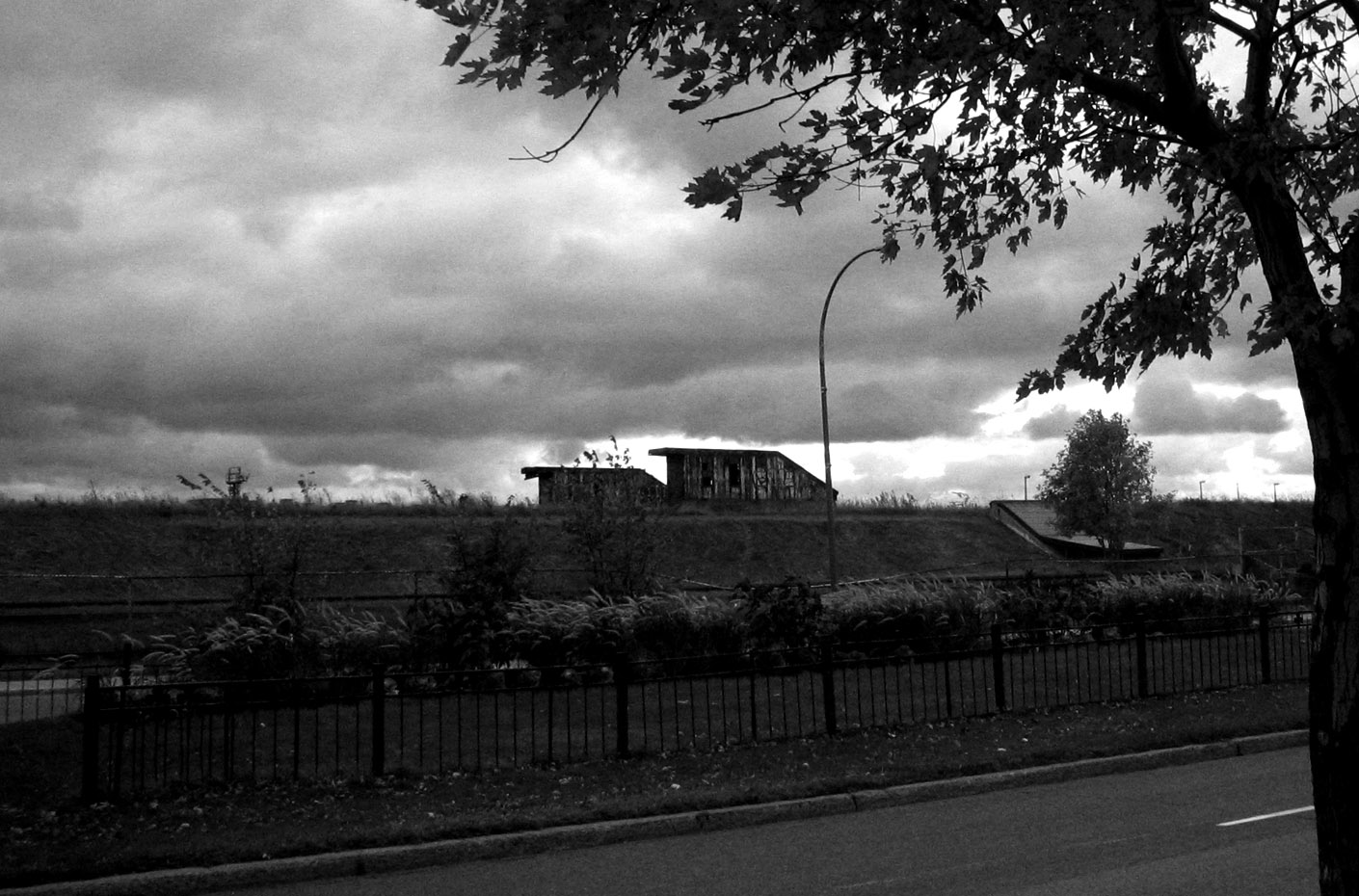
- Old Victoriatown train station, as it appeared in 2007.

- Location of Goose Village in Montreal
- Coordinates: 45.487972°N 73.547908°W
- Country: Canada
- Province: Quebec
- City: Montreal
- Borough: Le Sud-Ouest

Area
  - Land: 0.47 km^{2} (0.18 sq mi)
- Elevation: 20 m (66 ft)

Population (2011)
  - Total: 0
  - Density: 0/km^{2} (0/sq mi)
  - Population (1963): 1,500
- Postal Code: H3K
- Area codes: 514, 438

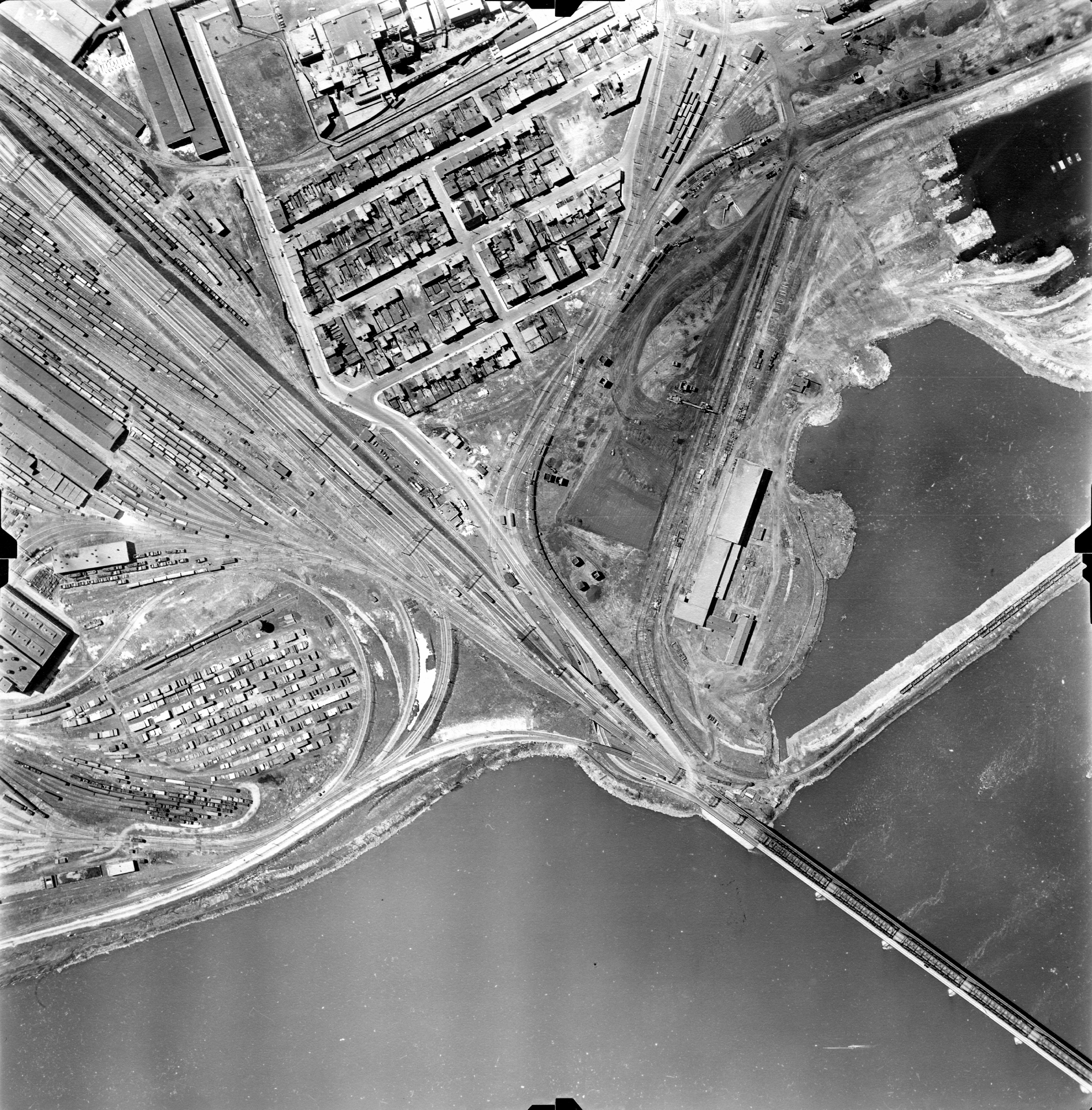
Aerial view of the Goose Village neighbourhood, taken between 1947 and 1949 (Archives de la Ville de Montréal)

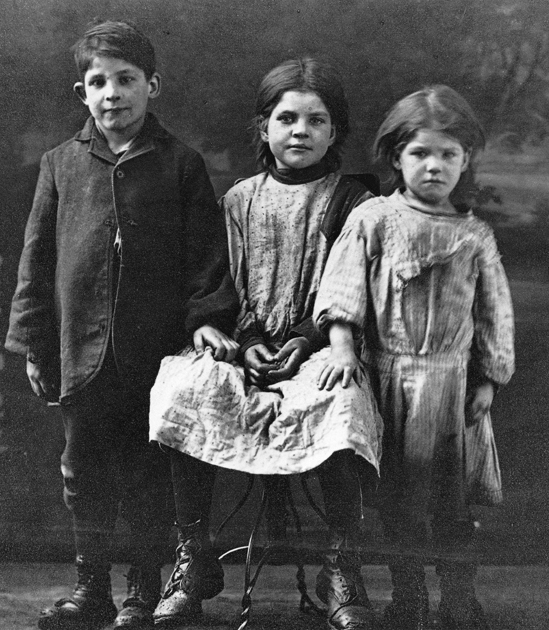
Goose Village children, c. 1910

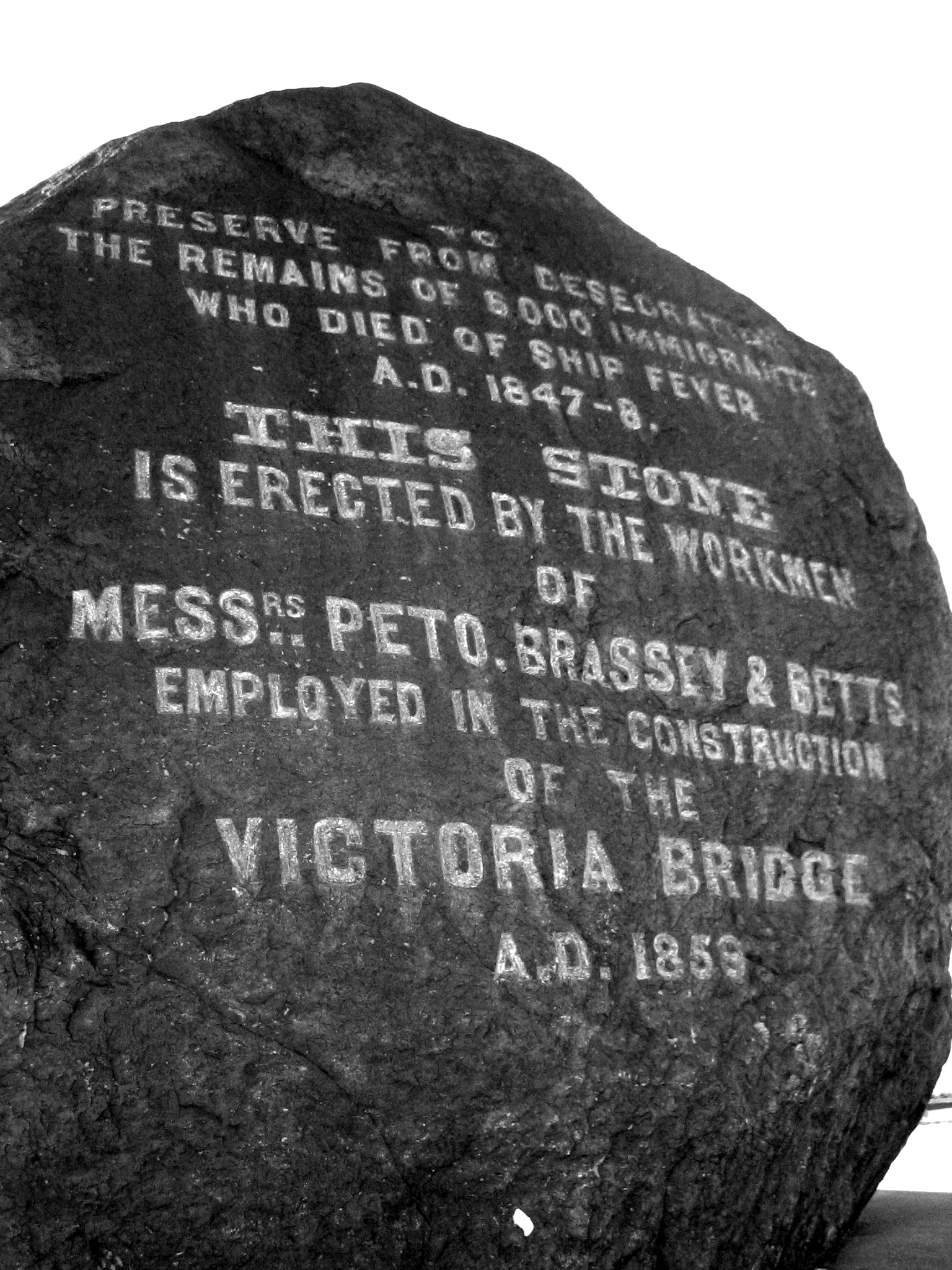
The Black Rock, commemorating thousands of Irish "ship fever" victims.

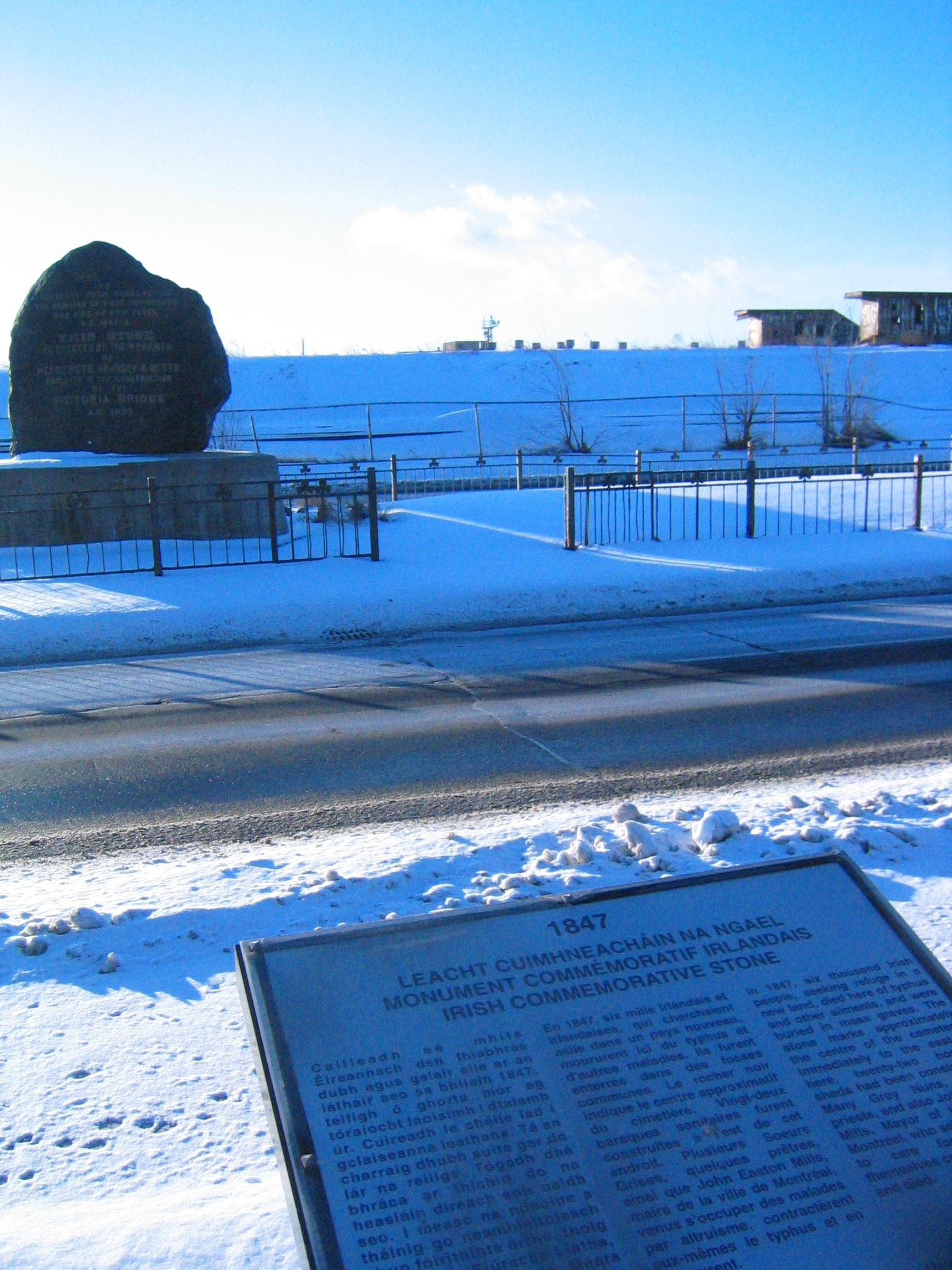
The Black Rock AKA Irish Commemorative Stone on Bridge Street, with plaque.

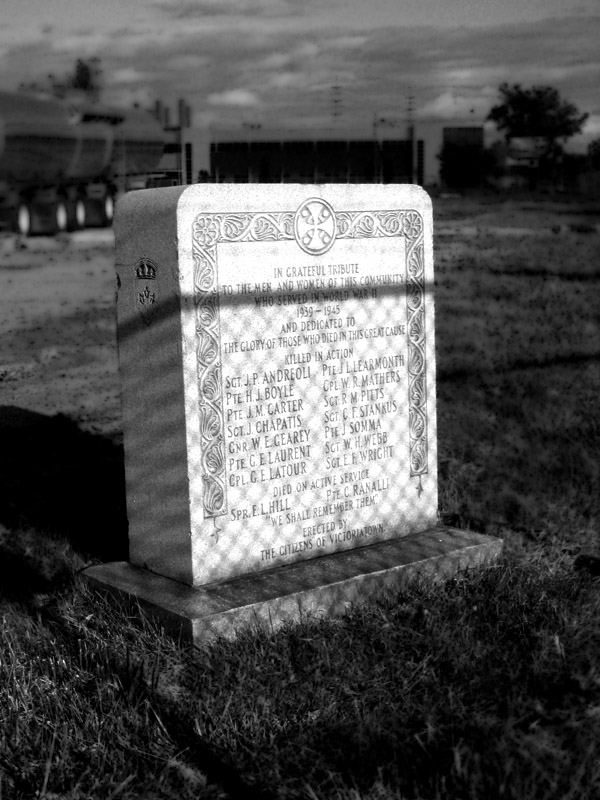
One of the last traces of old Victoriatown.

Goose Village (French: Village-aux-Oies, pronounced [vilaʒ oz‿wa]) was a neighbourhood in Montreal, Quebec, Canada. Its official but less commonly used name was Victoria town, after the adjacent Victoria Bridge.

The neighbourhood was built on an area formerly known as Windmill Point, where thousands of Irish immigrants died from disease in 1847 and 1848. The entire neighbourhood was demolished in 1964 as part of preparations for Expo 67, to be replaced by a football stadium and parking lot.

== Location ==
Goose Village was located near Griffintown, in what is now the Southwest borough. The community encompassed six streets, in what is now a bus station and parking lot. The streets were named after various bridges designed by the principal engineer of the Victoria Bridge, Robert Stephenson.

== History ==
=== Typhus epidemic ===
Windmill Point was a quarantine area where between 3,500 and 6,000 Irish immigrants died of typhus or "ship fever" in 1847 and 1848. The immigrants had been transferred from quarantine in Grosse Isle, Quebec. Due to a lack of suitable preparations, typhus soon reached epidemic proportions in Montreal. Three fever sheds were initially constructed, 150 feet (46 m) long by 40 to 50 feet (15 m) wide. As thousands more sick immigrants landed, more sheds had to be erected.

The number of sheds would grow to 22, with troops cordoning off the area so the sick couldn't escape. Grey Nuns cared for the sick, carrying women and children in their arms from ships to the ambulances. According to Montreal journalist and historian Edgar Andrew Collard, thirty of 40 nuns who went to help became ill, with seven dying. Other nuns took over, but once the surviving Grey Nuns had convalesced, they returned. Priests also helped, many falling ill after hearing the last confessions of the dying. When a mob threatened to throw the fever sheds into the river, Montreal mayor John Easton Mills quelled the riot and provided care, giving patients water and changing bedding. He died in November, having served less than a year in office. The Roman Catholic Bishop of Montreal urged French Quebecers to help their fellow Catholics. Many travelled to Montreal from the countryside to adopt children, in some cases passing their land on to them.

=== The Black Rock ===
A large black rock was erected in 1859 by workers to honour the victims, whose remains were uncovered during the construction of the Victoria Bridge. Its official English name is the Irish Commemorative Stone, but it is more commonly referred to as The Black Rock.

=== Demolition in 1964 ===
By 1960 most of the residents were Italian Canadians. The Italian residents, many of whom had arrived in Montreal after the Second World War, often came to Goose Village in search of a "place of their own" with a small backyard on which to relax after work and grow tomatoes, zucchini, and other vegetables that were a part of Italian cuisine. The quaint village included St. Alphonsus School, Piche's store, and a local cafe that served what was widely regarded as the best fish and chips to be found in the larger metropolitan area of Montreal.

The village was home to over 330 families or about 1,500 people. Greater Montreal was preparing for Expo 67, leaving the fate of the village—deemed an embarrassment by the city of Montreal and mayor Jean Drapeau—in doubt. The city compiled a report analyzing the living conditions in the area, which referred to a variety of drawbacks to the living conditions, which varied from many houses having no bathroom windows, to the wicked stench that came from the stockhouses in the area. Campaigns were undertaken to save the village, but behind the scenes political manoeuvers had doomed the town from the start.

The town was bulldozed in 1964, leaving only the fire station, train station, and the Black Rock memorial to note the passing of a proud community. The decision to raze the community put the many families out of their residences, consigning to memory the history of the village. Many of the razed homes had been built in Victorian style, but this alone was not enough to save them from demolition.

According to Kristian Gravenor, who conducted many interviews with former residents for a MA essay on Goose Village written in 1985, many speculated on the true causes that inspired the demolition. Some point to the urban renewal movement, which argued that poorer areas simply be demolished. Others speculated that it was a method for Drapeau to get even with his longtime civic political nemesis Frank Hanley, who represented the area. Many former residents suspected that Drapeau wanted the unglamorous area gone, as it would be the first place on the island that visitors to Expo 67 would see when arriving in Montreal via the Victoria Bridge. The planners of the Expo 67 World's Fair also wanted the site of Goose Village for a transportation system for the fair. A very large parking facility was built on part of Goose Village. Visitors to Expo 67 would park their cars there and then travel to the main site of Expo 67, located on Saint Helen's Island and Notre Dame Island, by high-speed electric train. This transportation system was completed in time for Expo 67 and was used successfully until the early 1970s when the World's fair closed down. Expo 67 had been so successful that it was extended for several years after 1967 under the name "Man and His World." The high-speed train, dubbed the Expo Express, ran from the former site of Goose Village to the Expo 67 site from 1967 through the autumn of 1972. Additionally, provincial highway planners also wanted part of the Goose Village land for the construction of an elevated expressway - the Bonaventure Expressway - between the new Champlain Bridge (which was inaugurated in 1962) and downtown Montreal, with an exit ramp leading to the Expo parking lot at the former Goose Village. The expressway opened in 1967 just in time for the Expo 67.

== After the demolition ==
Goose Village has been referred to as "sacred" and "special" by former residents. Joe Berlettano, who led the Victoriatown Boys Club in the village from 1955 to 1960, referred to the small-town culture of Goose Village as "just a beautiful environment." Another former resident, Linda Frannetti, when asked whether she would return to live in the village if she could, answered "Everybody says the same thing: We'd all go back." The Autostade—a football stadium erected for Expo 67 on part of the eight hectares where Goose Village had stood—was itself torn down in the late 1970s. Today this area is mostly uninhabited, containing light industry, a Costco, a train station parking lot, and undeveloped land.

Efforts by former residents of Goose Village to rebuild their community were blocked by the city, which claimed that soil in their plot of land was too polluted for residential use.

== Popular culture ==
The Brisset Beer Company, a microbrewery in nearby Griffintown, created "Victoria Town", an Irish-style stout, named for the former neighbourhood.
