= Irish Commemorative Stone =

Memorial in Montreal

Coordinates: 45.4869°N 73.5464°W

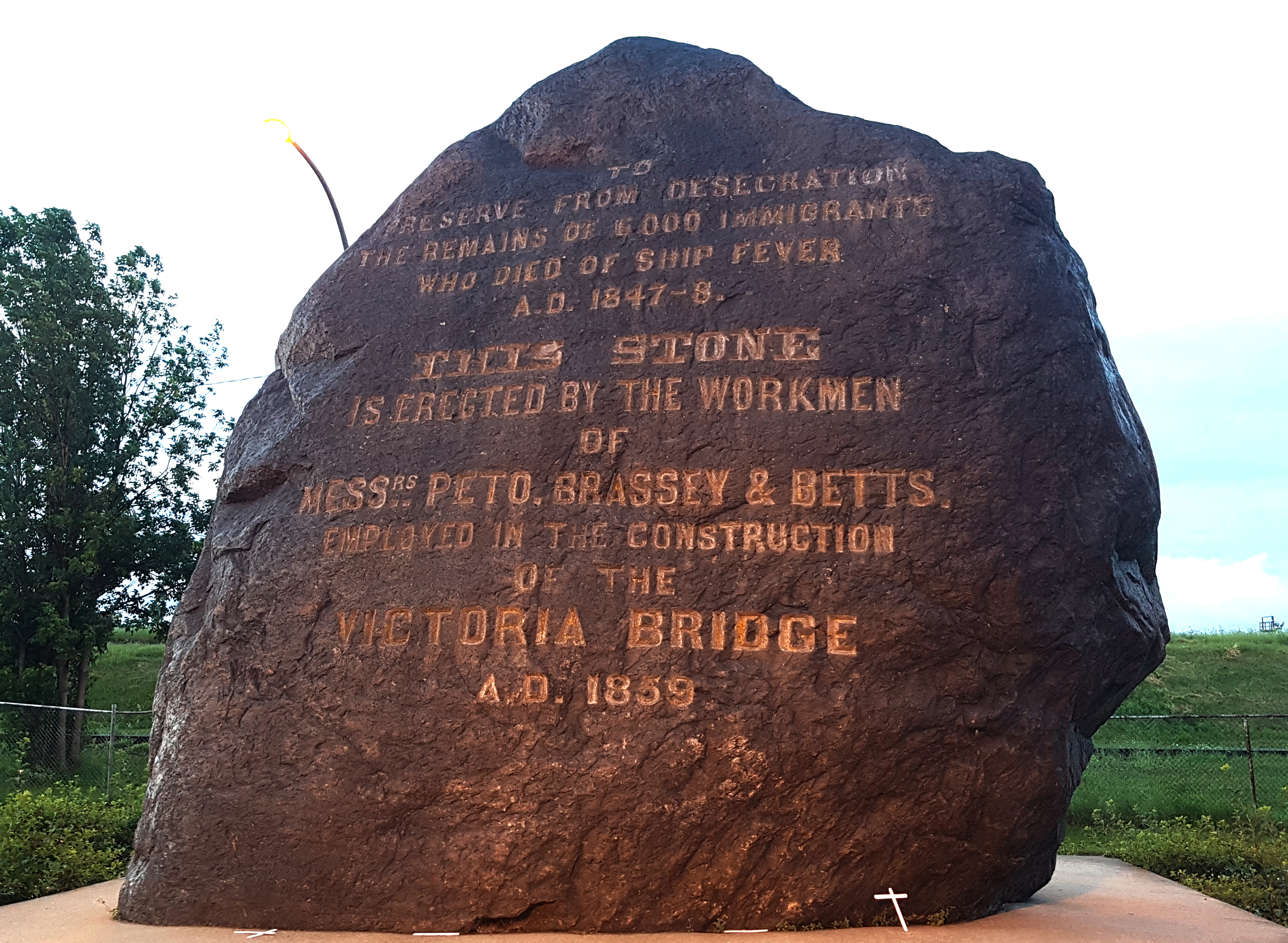
The Black Rock, commemorating thousands of Irish "ship fever" victims

The Irish Commemorative Stone (also known as the Black Rock) is a monument in Montreal commemorating the deaths from "ship fever" (typhoid) of 6,000 mostly Irish immigrants to Canada during the immigration following the Great Irish Famine in the years 1847-1848. It is located in the Pointe-Saint-Charles neighbourhood. Erected on 1 December 1859, the stone was the first Canadian monument to represent the famine.

It was decided to place the boulder to preserve the location of the cemetery that contains mostly Irish emigrants. James Hodges who was in charge of building the Victoria Bridge wrote of the day the stone was placed in his book.

The weight is approximately 30 tonnes, and size approximately 3 meters (10 ft) high.

Officially named the Irish Commemorative Stone, it is more commonly known as the Black Rock and also has been referred to as the Ship Fever Monument or the Boulder Stone.

As of October 2023 the Montreal Irish Monument Park Foundation became the owner of the monument. Plans are to make a park in the area and it is to be completed by the year 2030.

== History ==
During the mid-19th century, workers constructing the Victoria Bridge across the St. Lawrence River discovered a mass grave in Windmill Point where victims of the typhus epidemic of 1847 had been quarantined in fever sheds. The workers, many of whom were of Irish descent, were unsettled by the discovery and wanted to create a memorial to ensure the grave, which held the coffins of 6,000 Irish immigrants, would not be forgotten. Erected on 1 December 1859, the stone was the first Canadian monument to represent the famine. The inscription on the stone reads:

To Preserve from Desecration the Remains of 6000 Immigrants Who died of Ship Fever A.D. 1847-48

This Stone is erected by the Workmen of Messrs. Peto, Brassey and Betts Employed in the Construction of the Victoria Bridge A.D.

1859

Historic hand drawn maps have different placement of the twenty one sheds (arranged three by seven rows) and cemetery, named "emigrant sheds" and "emigrant burial ground" on the map. Some have the location on the east side of the bridge and train line, some have it on the west side of the bridge and train line.

From a decision made by some in February 1900, and despite disagreement on consensus published in March 1900, in December 1900 the monument was moved by Grand Trunk Railway. On 18 December 1901 the Grand Trunk Railway was requested by the delegates of the Irish societies to remove their tracks from the cemetery where the stone previously rested. The Irish immigrant monument was moved on 24 April 1902 to a granite pedestal in St. Patrick's Park. The Montreal Gazette newspaper, twenty five years later, printed a remembrance.

In 1911 a judgment made by Mr. Justice Mabee declared Canada was large enough for public utility corporations to carry on their business without desecrating graves, and told the Grand Trunk Railway to install an iron fence and then have the stone returned. On 24 June 1912 the stone was put back and 30 June 1912 agreement papers were signed. The re-unveiling took place 17 August 1913.

Photos in newspaper articles afterwards show the metal fence. The fence with shamrock icon has rusted away over the years and the remainder was removed for being a safety hazard some time after 2009, but not replaced. The cemetery is smaller and the stone is not in the exact location of the first placement, but reportedly fifteen feet away.

In June 1966 the stone marking the cemetery was again requested to be moved, but the road was moved instead. The Autostade was built to the north in 1966.

About 75,000 Irish people are believed to have emigrated to Canada during the famine. The official figures (from "the Report of a committee of the Honourable the Executive Council on matters of State"), gave the figures of 5,293 deaths at sea, and "Dr. Douglas, the medical Superintendent of Grosse Isle, estimated that 8,000 died at sea in 1847." However, the Montreal Gazette reported in 1934 that 18,000 Irish men, women and children died on the trip to Canada.

== Social significance ==
The Black Rock continues to be a significant icon, particularly within the Montreal Irish community led by the Ancient Order of Hibernians Canada. Each year at the end of May, on the Sunday, the Canadian Irish community hosts a walk from St. Gabriel's church in Pointe St. Charles to the stone to commemorate those lives that were lost.

== Proof ==
Proof of the mass burials of 1847-48 was documented when during excavations near the Victoria Bridge, workers found bodies in coffins.

Additional proof was found during construction of the REM in 2019. It revealed a group of twelve to fifteen bodies in a 2.3 metre diameter hole that was dug.

Human bones found in the area when found digging are interred near the monument.

== See also ==
- Ireland Park
- Goose Village
