= Ashby Magna railway station =

Former railway station in Leicestershire, England

Ashby Magna
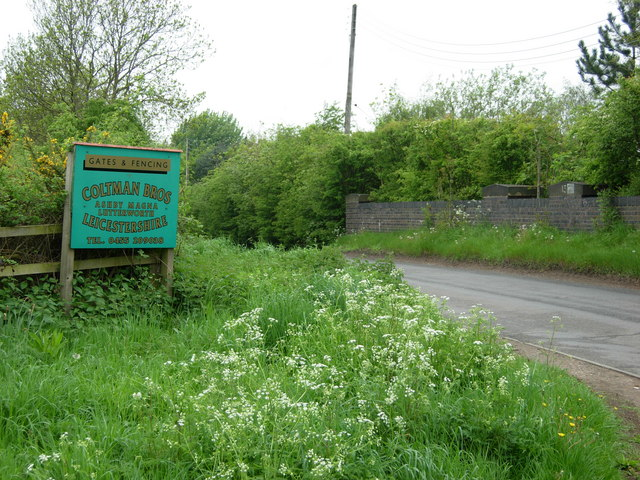
- Site of Ashby Magna station, 2006

General information
- Location: Ashby Magna, Harborough District, England
- Coordinates: 52.51199°N 1.18246°W
- Grid reference: SP55589077
- Platforms: 2

Other information
- Status: Disused

History
- Pre-grouping: Great Central Railway
- Post-grouping: London and North Eastern Railway, London Midland Region of British Railways

Key dates
- 15 March 1899: Opened
- 5 May 1969: Closed
Location

Ashby Magna was a station on the Great Central Main Line, the last main line to be constructed from the north of England to London. It was opened in 1899 to serve the village of Ashby Magna, in Leicestershire, England.

== History ==
Opened by the Great Central Railway, it became part of the London and North Eastern Railway as a result of the Grouping of 1923. The station then passed to the London Midland Region of British Railways on nationalisation in 1948. The station was closed, along with the railway line, by the British Railways Board in 1969, during the Beeching Axe.

Architecturally, the station was very similar to Whetstone in that it comprised a single island platform, designed by Alexander Ross; this allowed the tracks to pass on either side of a central platform and was intended to facilitate future expansion of the railway. Access to the station was via a stairway, which led down from the road bridge on Station Road.

Preceding station	Disused railways	Following station
Lutterworth; Line and station closed	Great Central Railway; London Extension	Whetstone; Line and station closed

== The site today ==
Little now remains of the station. The construction of the M1 motorway to the east of the station, which occurred whilst the line was still open, resulted in the demolition of the station master's house and the loss of the goods yard. A timber merchant now occupies the site and remains of the cattle dock are still visible.
