= Whetstone railway station =

Former railway station in Leicestershire, England

Coordinates: 52.5735°N 1.1818°W

Whetstone

General information
- Location: Whetstone, Blaby; England
- Grid reference: SP55589767
- Platforms: 2

Other information
- Status: Disused

History
- Pre-grouping: Great Central Railway
- Post-grouping: London and North Eastern Railway; London Midland Region of British Railways

Key dates
- 15 March 1899: Opened
- 4 March 1963: Closed
Location

Whetstone was a station on the Great Central Railway (GCR), the last main line to be constructed from the north of England to London, which opened in 1899 to serve the Leicestershire village of Whetstone.

Whetstone station was built by the Great Central as part of its London Extension, and opened to passengers on 15 March 1899. It was a conventional London extension station, common in towns on villages on the GCR, and was equipped with a single island platform. Access was from beneath the railway bridge, which once spanned Station Street near the centre of the village. The platform was on the south side of the bridge on an embankment that was particularly wide to accommodate the goods yard. All the station's buildings were situated on the single platform and comprised a porter's room, a booking office, general and ladies waiting rooms, plus a gentlemen's toilet block.

The station was one of the earlier closures on the line closing to passengers in 1963; it, like nearby Ashby Magna, served a relatively sparsely populated area and had always struggled to attract sufficient revenue.

Since closure, the railway embankment has been removed, along with all station buildings and platforms; only the stationmaster's house remains today. A new housing development has been constructed on the old trackbed formation.

| Preceding station | Disused railways | Following station |
|---|---|---|
| Ashby Magna; Line and station closed | Great Central Railway; London Extension | Leicester Central; Line and station closed |
