= Lutterworth railway station =

Former railway station in Leicestershire, England

Coordinates: 52.4563°N 1.1952°W

Lutterworth
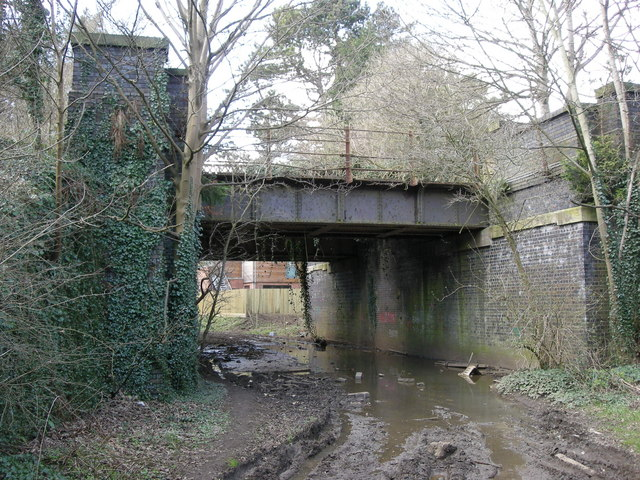
- Site of Lutterworth station in 2008

General information
- Location: Lutterworth, Harborough; England
- Grid reference: SP547845
- Platforms: 2

Other information
- Status: Disused

History
- Pre-grouping: Great Central Railway
- Post-grouping: London and North Eastern Railway, London Midland Region of British Railways

Key dates
- 15 March 1899: Opened
- 5 May 1969: Closed
Location

Lutterworth was a railway station that served the Leicestershire market town of Lutterworth, in England. It was on the Great Central Railway, the last main line to be constructed from the north of England to London.

== History ==
The station was opened on 15 March 1899. It was closed, along with the rest of the line, on 5 May 1969.

== Layout ==
The station was equipped with an island platform, designed by Alexander Ross, which allowed the tracks to pass either side of a central platform and was intended to facilitate future expansion of the railway.

== The site today ==
Little now remains of the station and a housing estate has been built on much of the station site. A small section of platform and the bricked-up entrance under the bridge are extant.

The stationmaster's house can be found along Station Road, with the cutting where the yards and station stood.

| Preceding station | Disused railways | Following station |
|---|---|---|
| Rugby Central; Line and station closed | Great Central Railway; London Extension | Ashby Magna; Line and station closed |
