= Passengers Act 1842 =

Act of the Parliament of the United Kingdom

Passengers Act 1842 (Note: Section 53. The act itself is cited only by the title "The Passengers Act"; the year 1842 has since been added, by convention, to distinguish it from other acts sharing the same short title.)
- Act of Parliament
- Parliament of the United Kingdom
- Long title: An Act for regulating the Carriage of Passengers in Merchant Vessels.
- Citation: 5 & 6 Vict. c. 107
- Territorial extent: United Kingdom

Dates
- Royal assent: 12 August 1842
- Commencement: 1 October 1842 (Note: Section 54.)
- Repealed: 1 October 1849
Other legislation
Amends	See § Repealed enactments
Repeals/revokes	See § Repealed enactments
Repealed by	Passengers Act 1849

Status: Repealed

Text of statute as originally enacted

The Passengers Act 1842 (5 & 6 Vict. c. 107) was an act of the Parliament of the United Kingdom that consolidated enactments related to the carriage of passengers by sea in merchant vessels from the United Kingdom.

== Provisions ==
=== Repealed enactments ===
Section 1 of the act repealed 3 enactments, listed in that section. Fines, forfeitures and penalties incurred, and any right of action accrued, under the repealed acts remained enforceable as if the act had not been passed.

Citation	Short title	Description	Extent of repeal
5 & 6 Will. 4. c. 53	Merchant Vessels, etc. Act 1835	An Act to repeal an Act of the Ninth Year of His late Majesty, for regulating the Carriage of Passengers in Merchant Vessels from the United Kingdom to the British Possessions on the Continent and Islands of North America; and to make further Provision for regulating the Carriage of Passengers from the United Kingdom.	The whole act.
3 & 4 Vict. c. 21	Passenger Ships Act 1840	An Act to extend to the British Colonies in the West Indies an Act passed in the Fifth and Sixth Year of His late Majesty King William the Fourth, for regulating the Carriage of Passengers in Merchant Vessels.	The whole act.
1 & 2 Vict. c. 113	Customs Act 1838	An Act to amend the Laws relating to the Customs.	So much as extends the provisions of the Merchant Vessels, etc. Act 1835 to foreign vessels, under certain circumstances.

== Subsequent developments ==
The whole act was repealed by section 1 of the Passengers Act 1849 (12 & 13 Vict. c. 33), which came into force on 1 October 1849.
