= Edgar Andrew Collard =

Canadian journalist and historian

Edgar Andrew Collard CM
- Born: 6 September 1911; Montreal, Quebec
- Died: 9 September 2000 (aged 89)
- Education: McGill University (MA, History)
- Occupations: Journalist, historian
- Employer: The Montreal Gazette
- Known for: "All Our Yesterdays" newspaper column
- Spouse: Elizabeth Collard
- Awards: National Newspaper Award

Edgar Andrew Collard CM (6 September 1911 – 9 September 2000) was a Canadian journalist and historian, best known for his Montreal Gazette column "All Our Yesterdays". He was born in Montreal, Quebec.

He received his MA in history from McGill University in 1937. However health problems prevented him from completing his formal studies and ended his hopes of becoming a history professor.

Collard's association with The Montreal Gazette began when he submitted articles on Montreal's history. This led to an offer of a full-time job in the newspaper's library.

The first issue of his column "All Our Yesterdays" appeared in The Montreal Gazette on August 14, 1944 and appeared every weekend for 56 years. Each week the column addressed an episode or aspect of Montreal history. The column was reportedly read by figures including Pierre Trudeau and Robertson Davies. His columns were compiled in several books which were illustrated by his longtime collaborator John Collins.

In 1949, he won the inaugural National Newspaper Award for editorial writing and was to win it another three times, a record unmatched in that category.

In 1953, he became editor-in-chief of The Gazette, retiring from that position in 1971. He continued his column until a month before his death. He was survived by his wife, the historian Elizabeth Collard who died soon after.

Collard was made a Member of the Order of Canada in 1976.
