= Alexander McKenzie Ross =

British engineer (1805–1862)

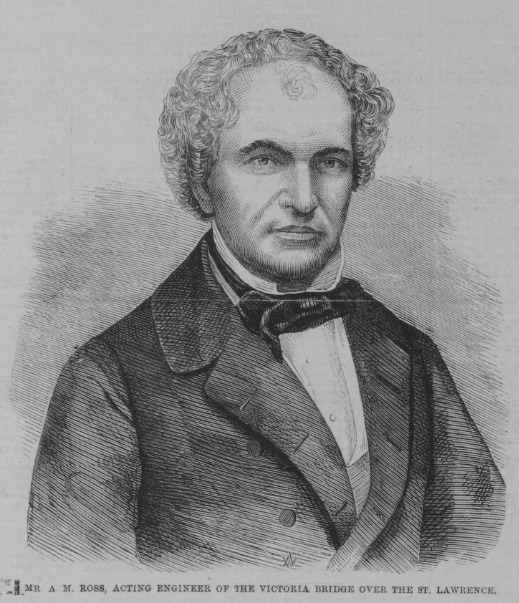
- From the Illustrated London News 19 February 1859
- Born: 25 December 1805; Ulladale, Logie-Easter
- Died: 8 August 1862 (aged 56)
- Occupation: Engineer
- Known for: Grand Trunk Railway and Victoria Bridge (Montreal)

Alexander McKenzie Ross (25 December 1805 – 8 August 1862) was a British builder and engineer.

== Career ==
In 1823, aged 18, he moved to London where his uncle, Hugh Ross, was working with Hugh McIntosh, a civil engineer and contractor for public works. He remained with McIntosh until 1836. He then joined with Robert Stephenson and worked on numerous challenging projects in the UK, together with Francis Thompson. He was appointed manager for a section of the North Midland Railway in Derbyshire. In 1842 he then worked with Stephenson as resident engineer on the Chester and Holyhead Railway and on completion of this work he became one of the two chief assistants to Stephenson, the other being Frank Foster. He was then involved in the construction of the Conwy Railway Bridge across the River Conwy and the Britannia Bridge across the Menai Straits.

In 1853 Ross was appointed chief engineer for Canada's Grand Trunk Railway. and together with Robert Stephenson he designed the famous Victoria Bridge at Montreal, Quebec, the first bridge to span the St. Lawrence River. The bridge, opened in 1859, remains in use to this day, carrying both road and rail traffic.

== Life ==
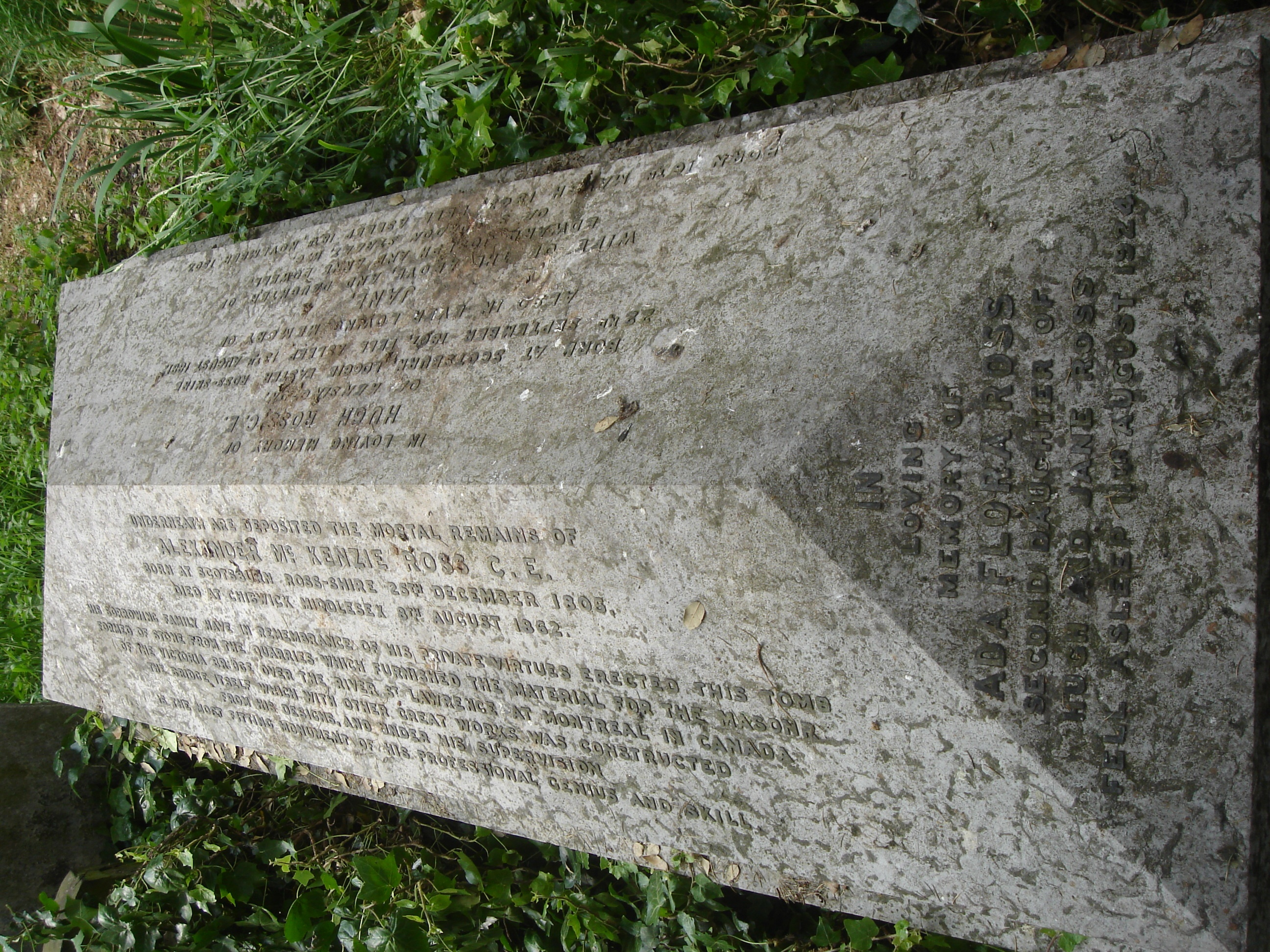
Funerary monument, Brompton Cemetery, London

He was born in Ulladale, Logie-Easter, Ross & Cromarty in Scotland, the 4th child of John Ross (1765-1812) farmer and wheelwright, and Barbara Boog (1773-1849). Aged 6 his father died, so his mother moved to Dornoch and he was educated at the local public school under John Davidson, a scholar of some note.

His first wife Augusta died on 11 October 1853 in Montreal, Canada.

He married Isabella Kerr (1825-1854) around 1854 in Montreal, Canada, and they had the following children:

- Elizabeth Charlotte McKenzie Ross (1855-1935)
- Robina Augusta Stephenson Ross (b. 1857-1952)
- Clemintina Louisa Ross (1858-1934)
- John Ross (b.1860)

Ross died in Chiswick and is buried in Brompton Cemetery, London.
