= Victoria Bridge (Montreal) =

Bridge in Quebec

Victoria Bridge Pont Victoria
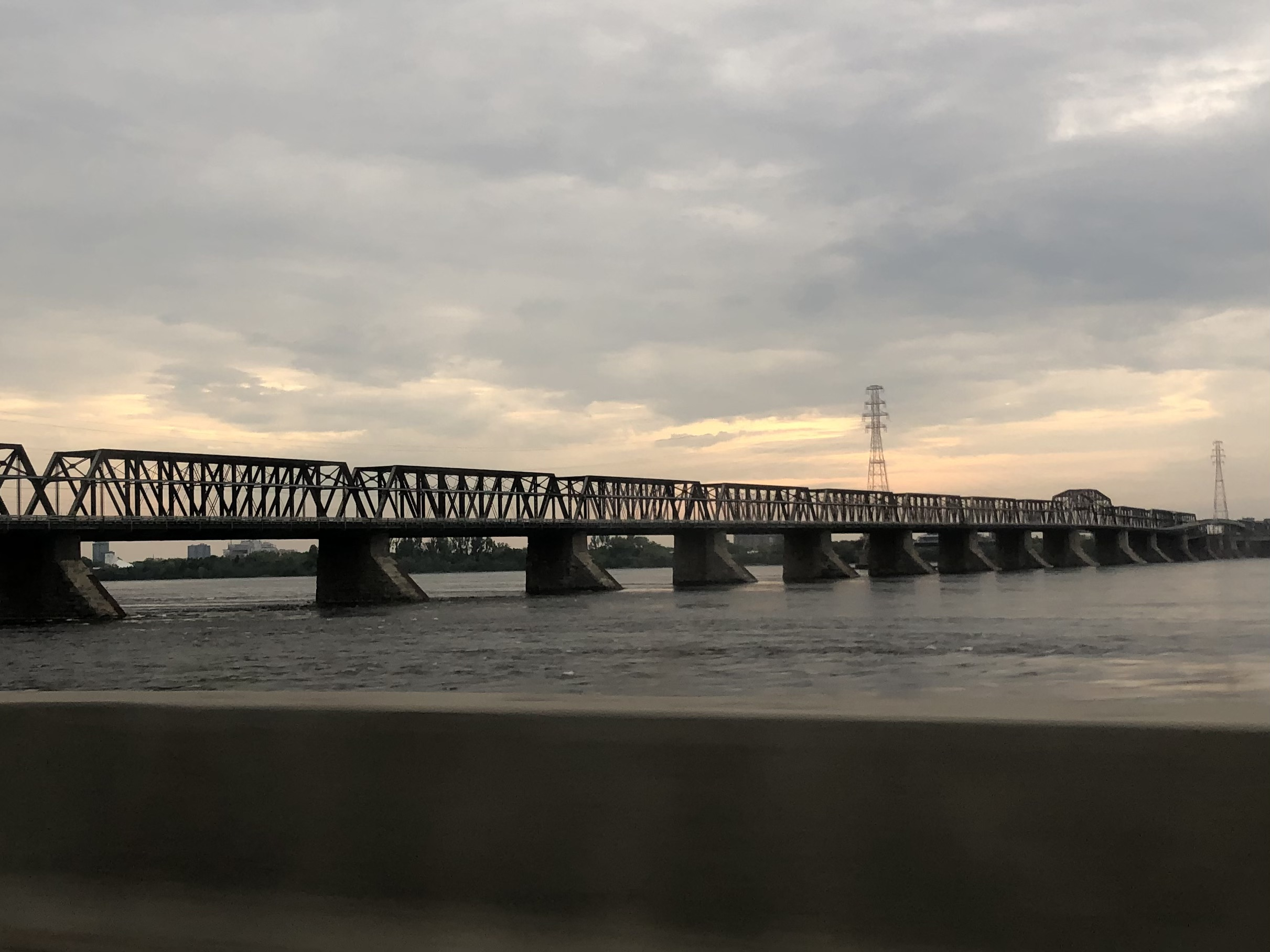
- Victoria Bridge as viewed from upstream, from Montreal Technoparc
- Coordinates: 45.49165°N 73.52912°W
- Carries: Route 112; Canadian National Railway, Exo Mont-Saint-Hilaire line, Via Rail, and Amtrak
- Crosses: St. Lawrence River and Saint Lawrence Seaway
- Locale: Saint-Lambert, Quebec and Montreal, Quebec (Neighbourhood of Victoriatown)

Characteristics
- Design: Tubular bridge, original; Truss bridge, replacement includes two lift bridges to accommodate the seaway
- Longest span: 110 m
- Piers in water: 24
- No. of lanes: 2, one each on either side of the rail bridge

Rail characteristics
- No. of tracks: 2
- Track gauge: 1,435 mm (4 ft 8 1/2 in) standard gauge
- Structure gauge: AAR
- Electrified: No

History
- Opened: August 25, 1860

Location
- Interactive map of Victoria Bridge

The Victoria Bridge (French: Pont Victoria), previously known as Victoria Jubilee Bridge, is a bridge over the St. Lawrence River, linking Montreal, Quebec, to the south shore city of Saint-Lambert.

Opened in 1859, originally as a tubular bridge designed by Robert Stephenson, the bridge was the first to span the St. Lawrence River, and as such is an important historic bridge in Canada. It remains in use to this day, carrying both road and rail traffic, with rails in the middle and roadways (part of Route 112) on both sides. It is actively used by the Canadian National Railway on its Halifax to Montreal main line. It is a major contributor to Montreal's role as a continental hub in the North American rail system. Its designation for the Canadian National Railway (CNR commonly known as CN) is mile 71.4 St-Hyacinthe subdivision.

Originally named the Great Victoria Bridge in honour of Queen Victoria, it was officially rededicated as the Victoria Jubilee Bridge following renovations in 1897. It was returned to the name Victoria Bridge (Pont Victoria) in 1978.

The bridge is approximately 2 kilometres (1.2 mi) long, and includes 24 ice-breaking piers.

== History ==
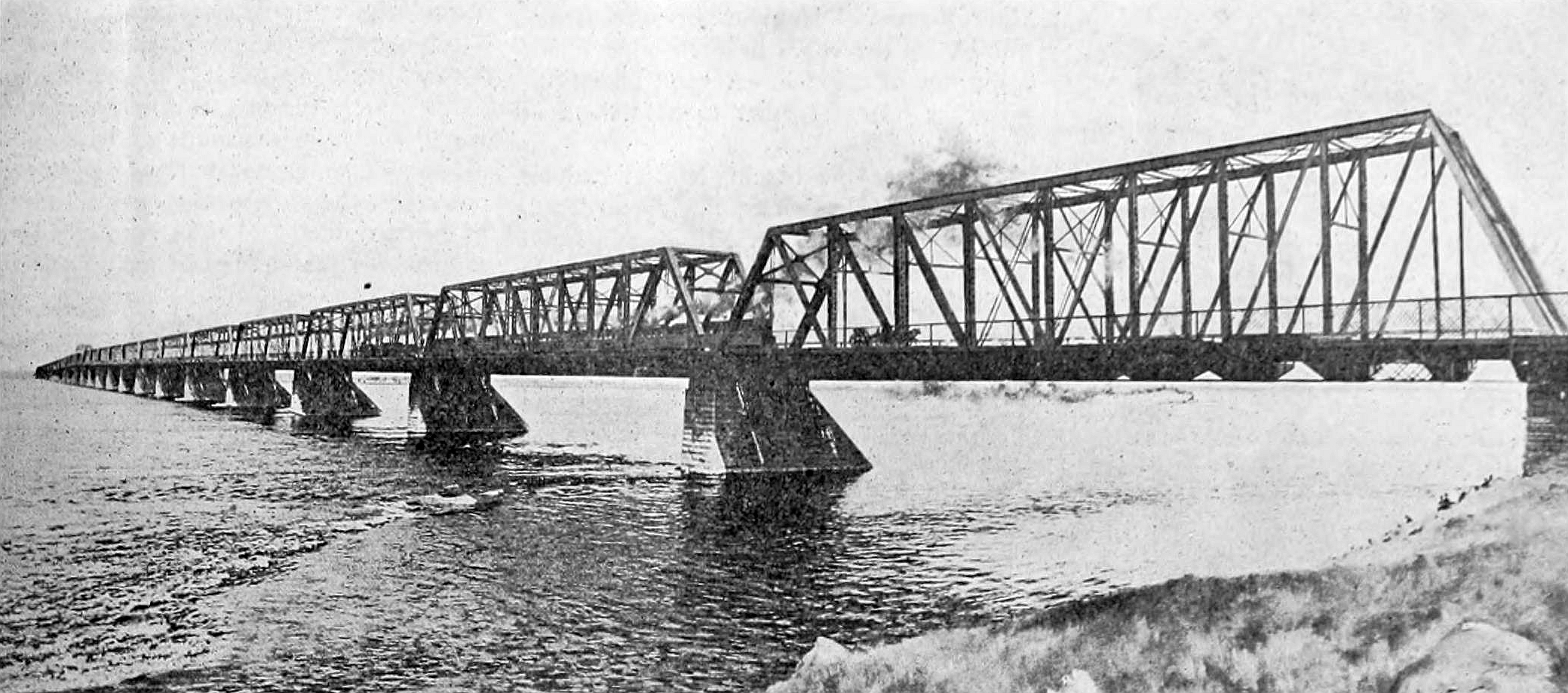
Victoria Bridge, 1901. Viewed from downstream.

The Victoria Bridge was erected between 1854 and 1859. Prior to the construction of the bridge, it was difficult and at times impossible to cross the St. Lawrence River during the long winter season, as freezing and thawing in the fall and spring made for treacherous conditions. Crossings took place by boat during the summer, and by walking or riding a sleigh or cart over the frozen river in winter, along routes cleared of snow to facilitate passage.

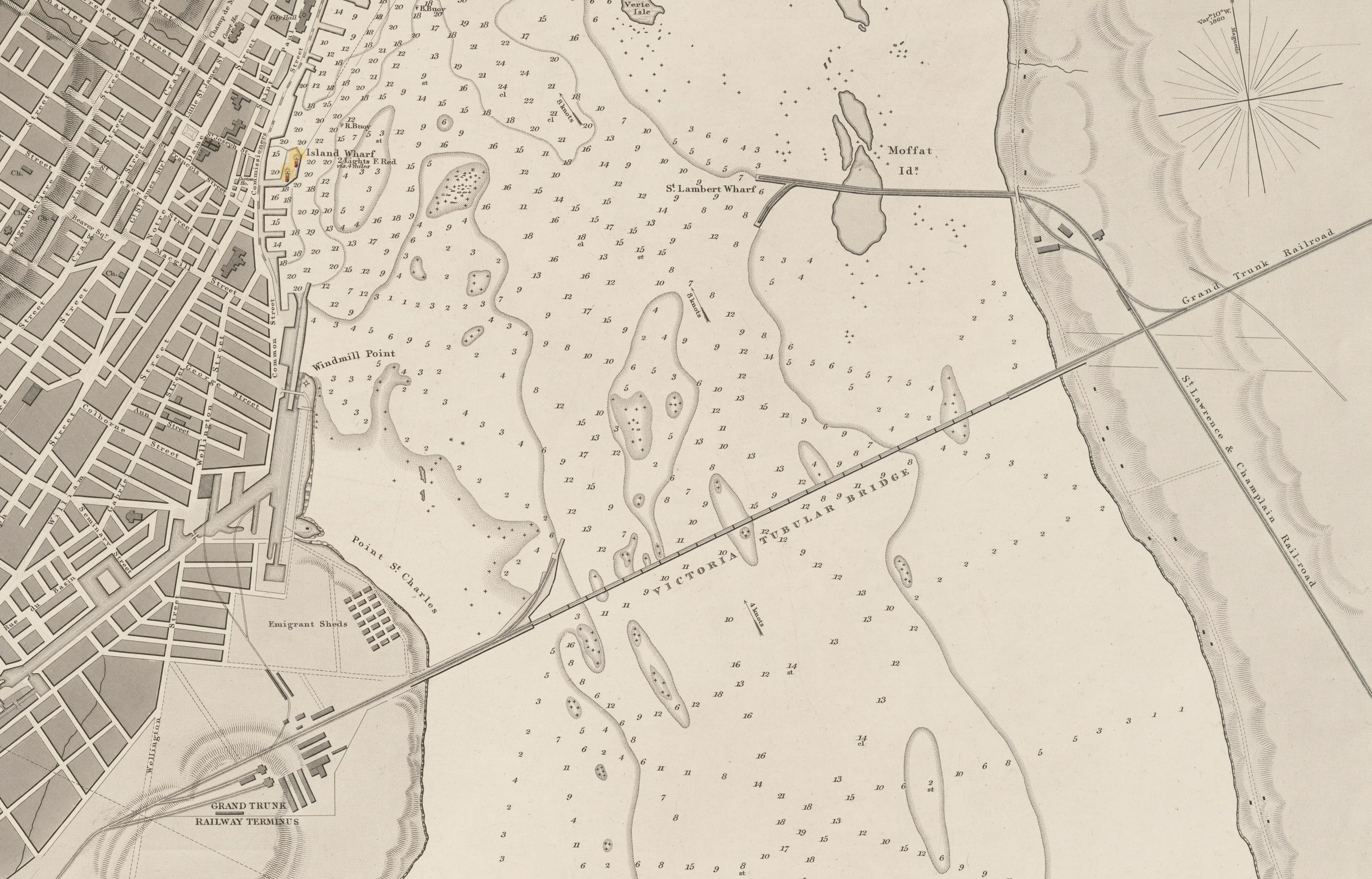
The Victoria Tubular Bridge shown on a chart published in 1860

A site for the bridge was selected by the Canadian engineer Thomas Keefer. The structure was designed by Robert Stephenson (son of George Stephenson and the builder of the famed Rocket locomotive), and Alexander McKenzie Ross.

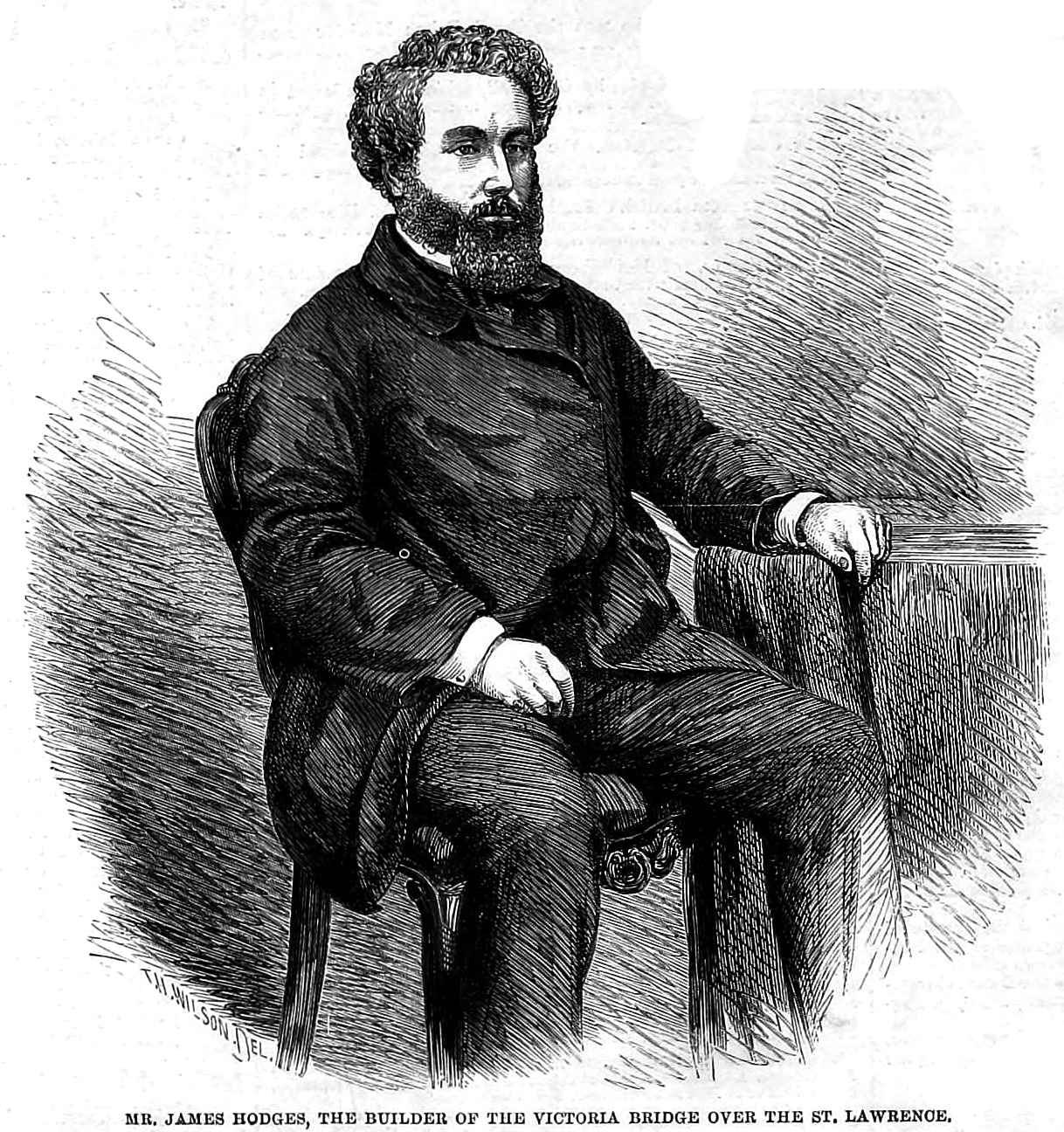
James Hodges

The chief engineer was James Hodges. The contractors were the English partnership of Peto, Brassey and Betts, who completed the bridge shortly after Stephenson's death in 1859.

The original deck was a long structural metal tube (a tubular bridge) made of prefabricated wrought iron sections made in England and shipped transatlantic. During its peak construction years a total of six steamboats, 72 barges, 3,040 men (of which there were several children between the ages of 8 and 12), 144 horses, and four locomotive engines were required to build it at a cost of $6,600,000. The construction of the bridge was tied directly with that of the Grand Trunk Railway, a system headquartered in Britain which had been formed in 1852 with the support of the colonial government of the United Province of Canada to connect the Great Lakes with an ice-free port on the Atlantic Ocean (at Portland, Maine). When completed, it was the longest bridge in the world.

The Victoria Bridge was officially inaugurated by Albert Edward, the Prince of Wales on August 25, 1860. The first freight train however had already passed over the bridge on December 12, 1859, and the first passenger train had crossed the bridge five days later on December 17. Queen Victoria had been invited to attend the opening of the bridge, but she declined the invitation and instead sent her eldest son, the Prince of Wales.

Due to the needs of increased traffic in 1897–1898, the single-track metal tube from 1860 was replaced by metal trusses, 66 feet 8 inches wide, carrying a double track, a roadway for an electric tram-line, space for vehicular traffic, and a pavement for pedestrians. The engineers designing the new structure came to the conclusion that the striking stability and condition of the masonry piers would carry the new bridge with but slight alteration. As a result of this conclusion it was decided to erect the new structure around the old bridge, cutting away the latter span by span, so that there was no interruption to the train service. The tube was then demolished. The stone piers from 1860, slightly altered in 1897, still testify to the excellent original engineering.

Between October 30, 1909 and October 13, 1956, the Montreal and Southern Counties Railway ran interurban streetcars on the Northern shoulder of the bridge. The line connected Granby and Montreal, with a later branch serving Longueuil.

The St. Lambert Diversion around the St. Lambert Locks was added in 1958 as part of the St. Lawrence Seaway project. This secondary bridge over the canal, south of the main bridge, also carries both road and rail, and is used when a ship is passing under the original alignment.

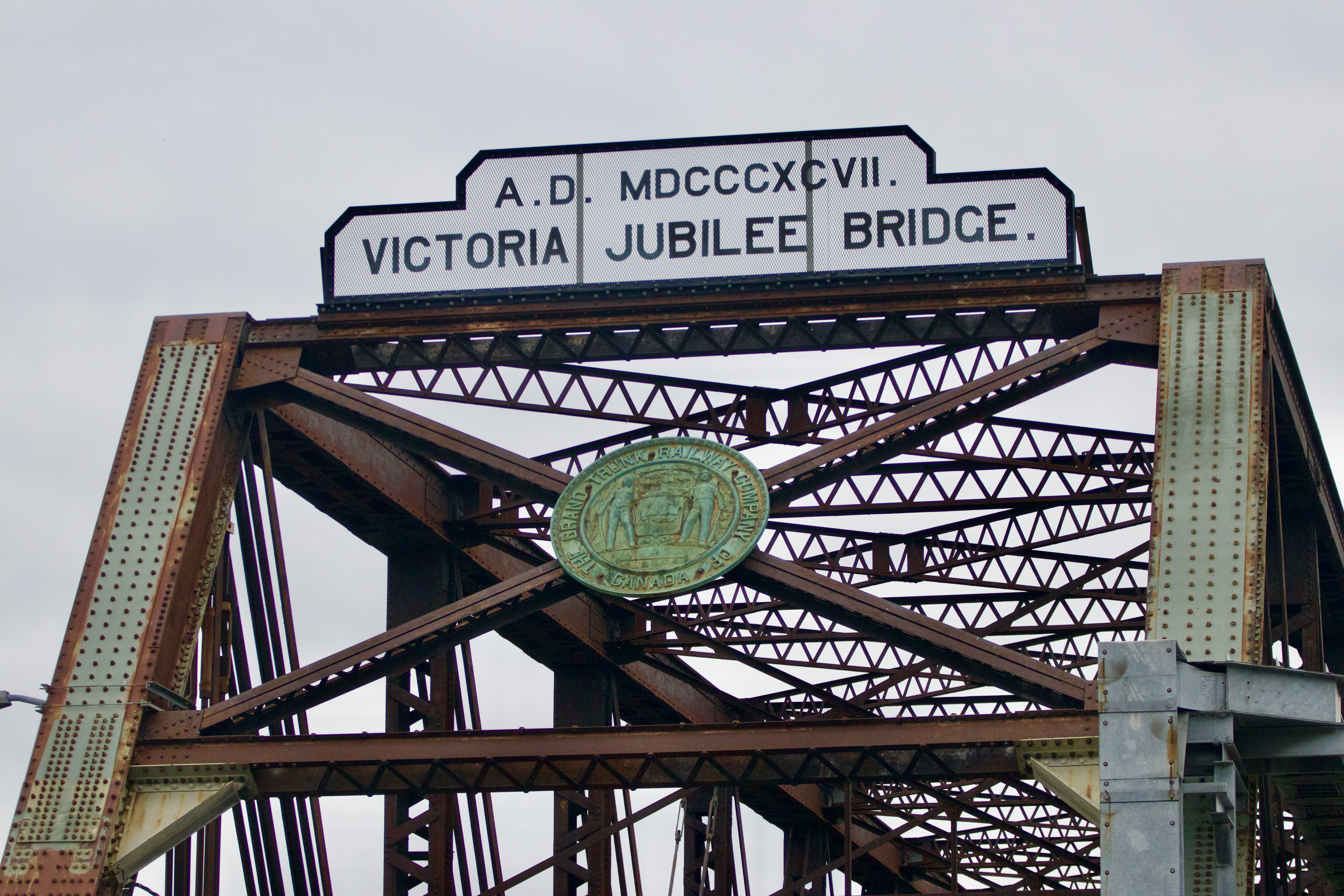
Entry structure of Victoria Bridge marked with the 1897 Jubilee dedication to Queen Victoria

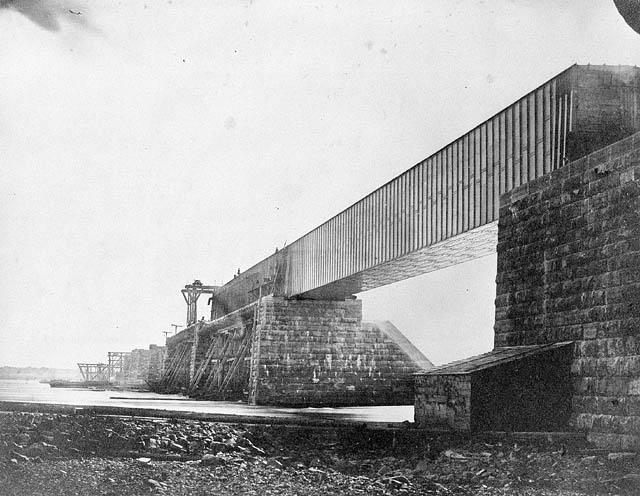
Victoria Bridge under construction

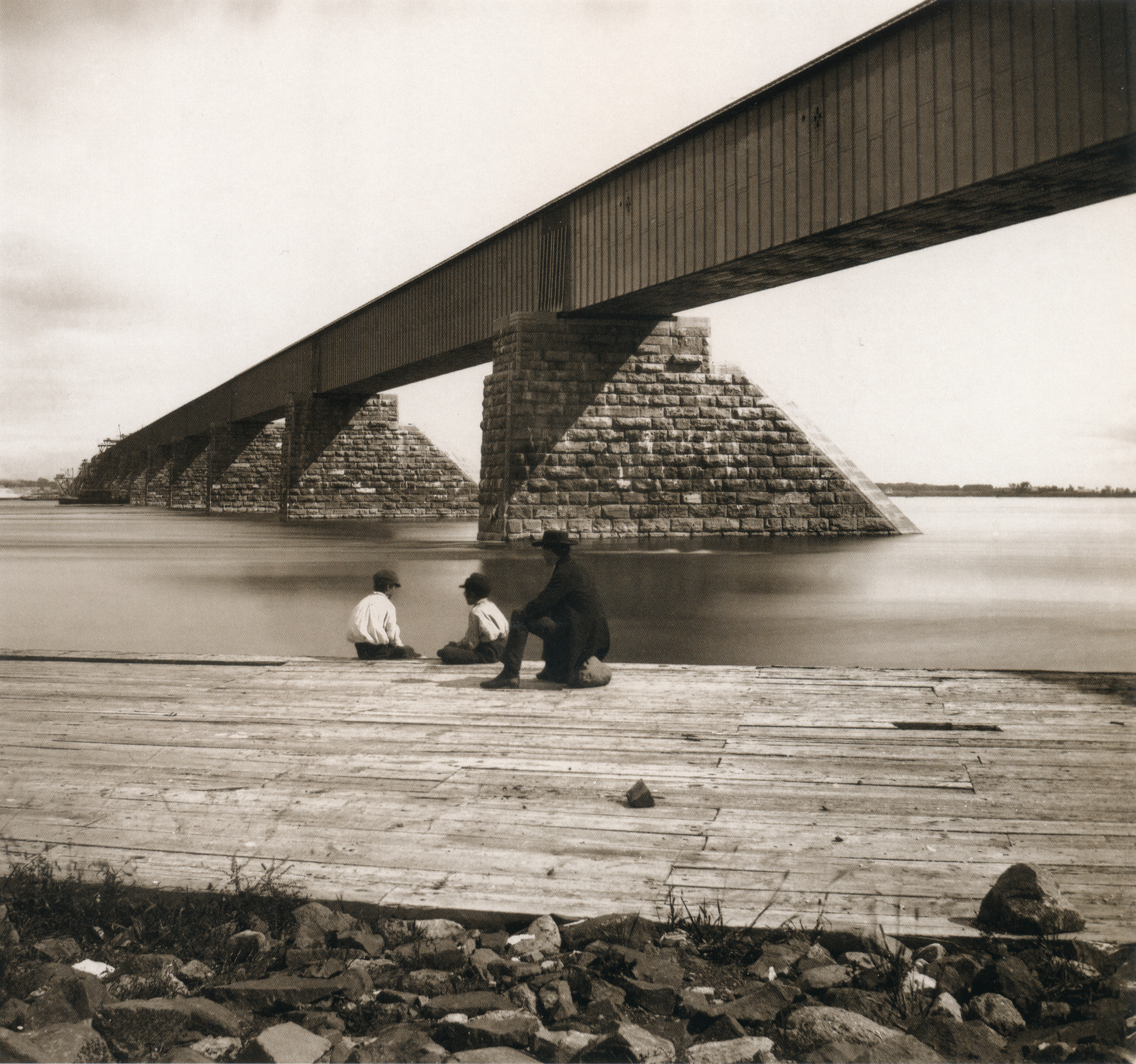
The newly-constructed bridge in 1859

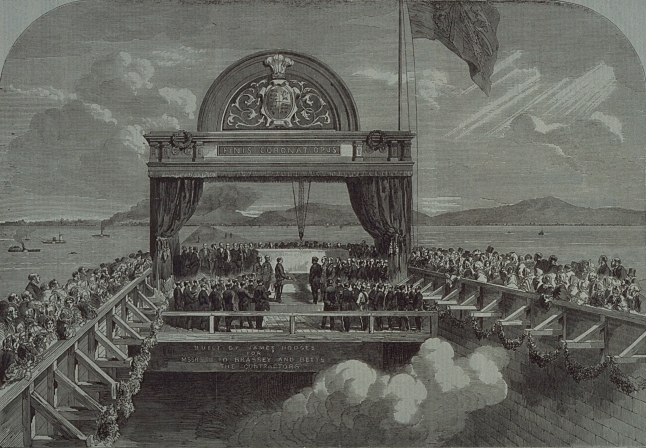
The laying of the last stone on the bridge by Albert Edward, Prince of Wales, 1860

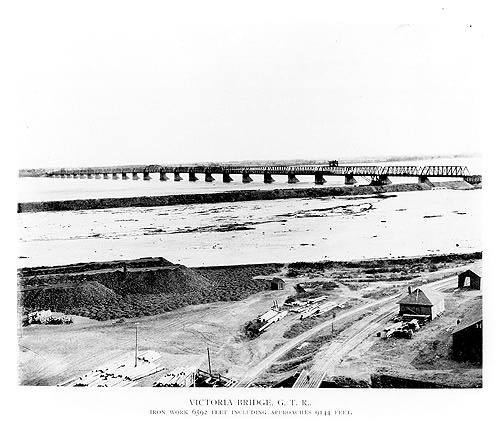
Victoria Bridge as it appeared in 1898

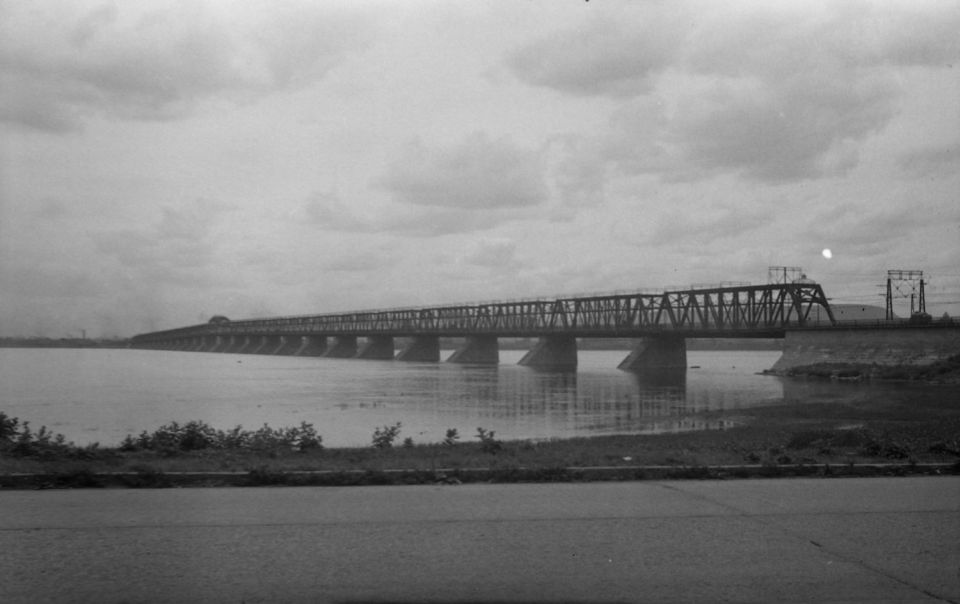
In 1948
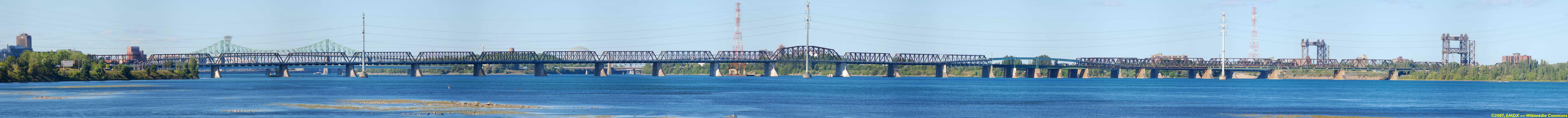
Victoria bridge seen from Île-des-Sœurs, with Jacques-Cartier bridge in the background.

== Use ==
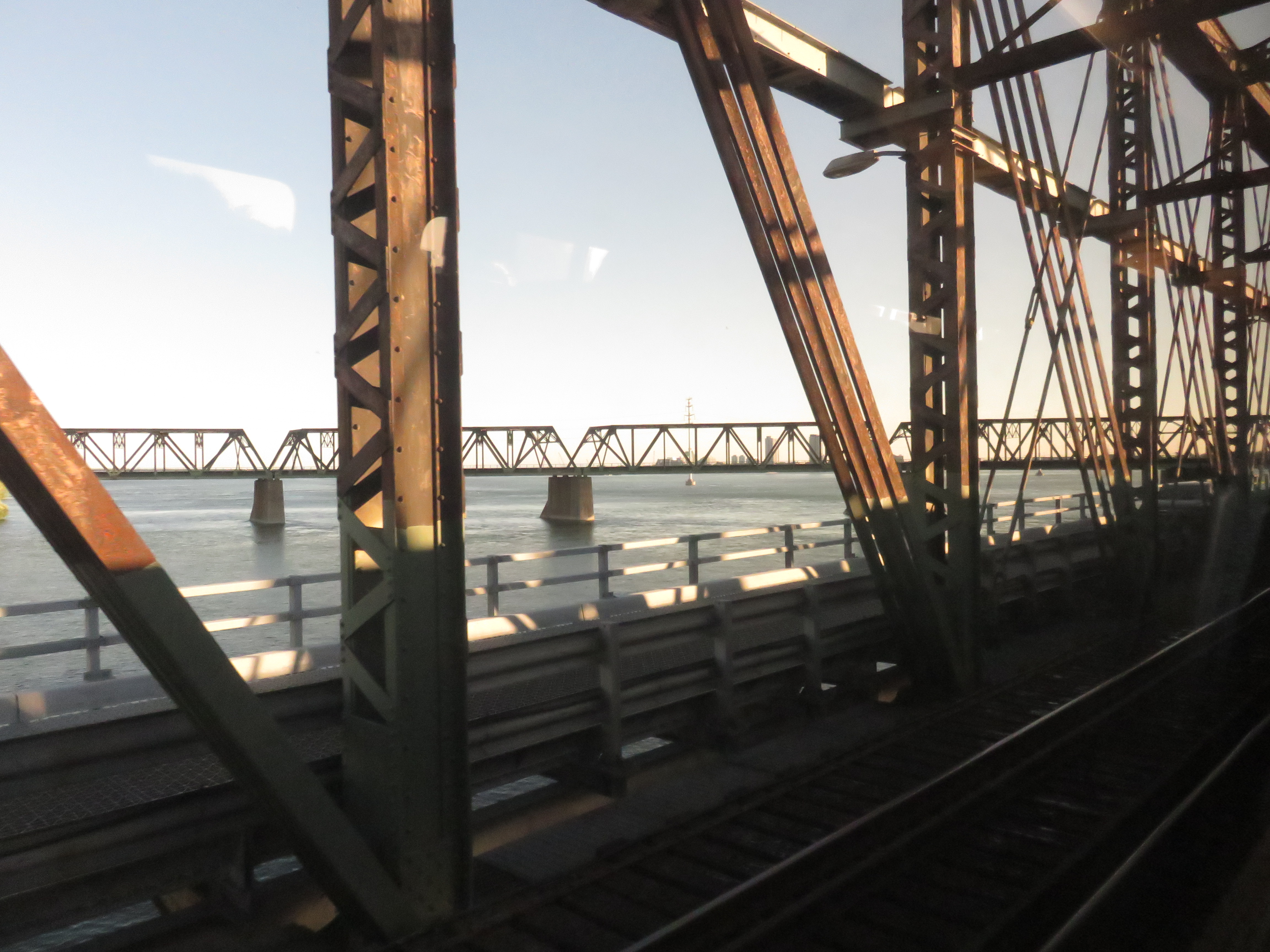
Deck of the bridge viewed from a train

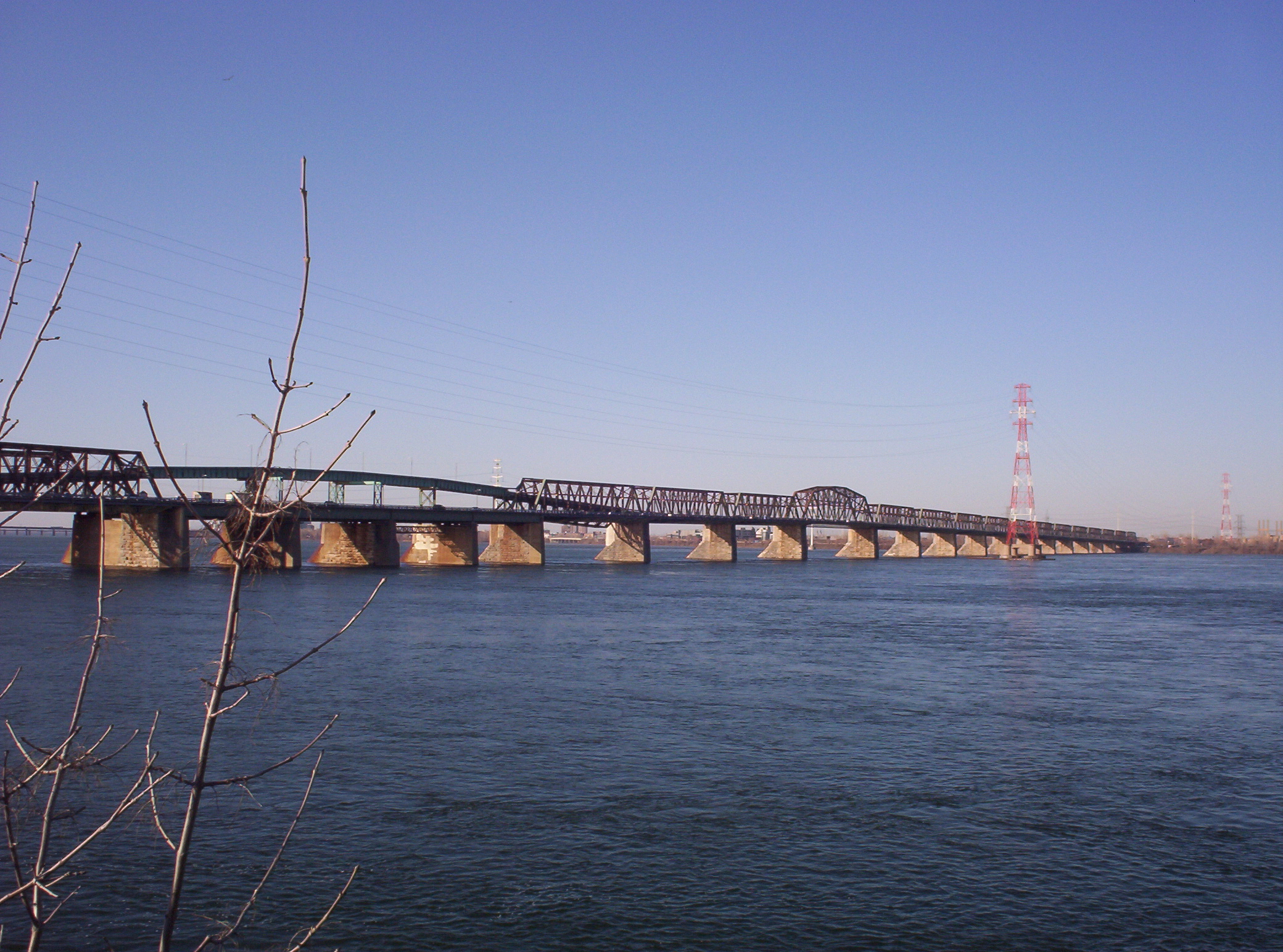
Victoria Bridge as viewed from Parc Jean-Drapeau

During the morning rush hour, from 5:00 am to 9:00 am, both lanes of the Victoria Bridge are used to travel north, (Note: Directions are according to traditional Montreal map where downtown (example, rue Sherbrooke) is east-west, with Mont-Royal to the north and the river to the south. "North" on the Victoria bridge is actually south-west.) from the residential suburb of Saint-Lambert to the business districts of Montreal. In the evening, from 3:00 pm to 7:15 pm, both lanes are used in the opposite direction. At all other times, there is one lane available in each direction.

The only bus route allowed on the bridge is a special bus from the Réseau de transport de Longueuil, bus number 55. The line is served by older Nova Bus LFS buses due to weight restrictions on the bridge (38 customers maximum aboard a low-floor type bus). All other heavy vehicles are forbidden from accessing the bridge and must detour either via the neighbouring Samuel-De Champlain or Jacques-Cartier bridges. The low clearance on both approaches and the narrow lanes on the bridge itself make the bridge virtually inaccessible even to light trucks.

== See also ==
- List of bridges in Canada
- Royal eponyms in Canada
