= Pest house =

Building used for persons afflicted with communicable diseases

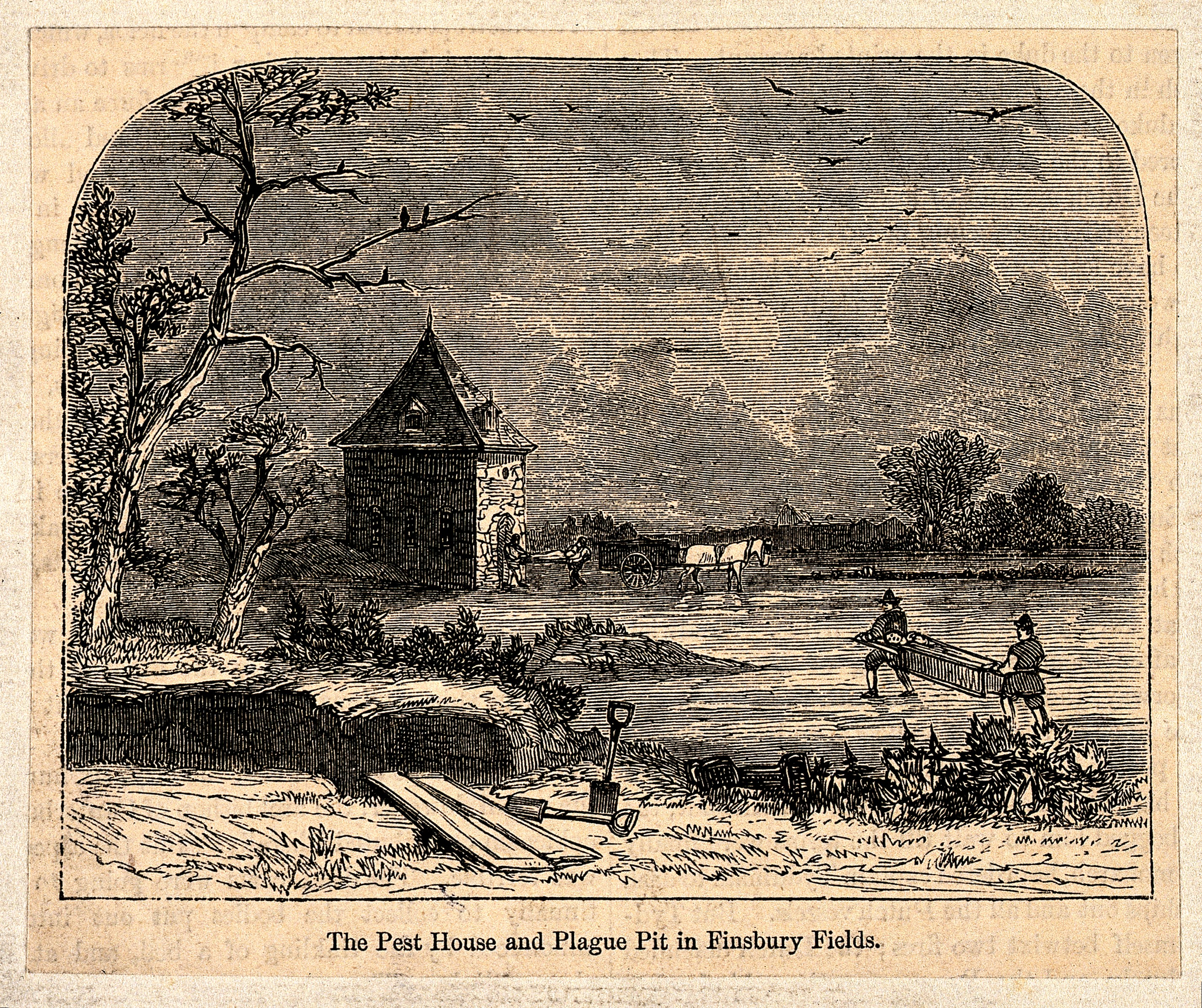
1865 depiction of the pest house and plague pit in Finsbury Fields

A pest house, plague house, pesthouse or fever shed was a type of building used for persons afflicted with communicable diseases such as tuberculosis, cholera, smallpox or typhus. Often used for forcible quarantine, many towns and cities had one or more pesthouses accompanied by a cemetery or a waste pond nearby for disposal of the dead.

== Fever sheds in Canada ==
Fever sheds were built in several communities across Eastern Canada in 1847, to quarantine sick and dying Irish immigrants, who contracted typhus during the voyage to the New World during the Great Famine.

=== Montreal ===
In Montreal, between 3,500 and 6,000 Irish immigrants died in fever sheds in a quarantine area known as Windmill Point. Three sheds were initially constructed, 150 feet (46 m) long by 40 to 50 feet (15 m) wide. As thousands more sick immigrants landed, more sheds had to be erected. The number of sheds would grow to 22, with troops cordoning off the area so the sick could not escape.

=== Toronto ===
In Toronto, during the summer of 1847, 863 Irish immigrants died of typhus at fever sheds built by the Toronto Board of Health at the northwest corner of King and John Street. There were at least 12 sheds, 22 metres long by 7.5 metres wide.

=== Saint John ===
Partridge Island, New Brunswick, just outside the main harbour of Saint John, was chosen as the location for a pest house and quarantine station as far back as 1785. In 1847, with a large influx of Irish migrants, the typhus epidemic quickly filled the fever shed with sick and dying. By the 1847 typhus season, 2115 people had died in New Brunswick, with 1196 dying at Partridge Island and in Saint John.

== Surviving pest houses ==
=== The Netherlands ===
There is an extant pest house in Leiden, the Pesthuis (nl), built in 1661 to accommodate many patients, although it has never served this purpose.

=== United Kingdom ===
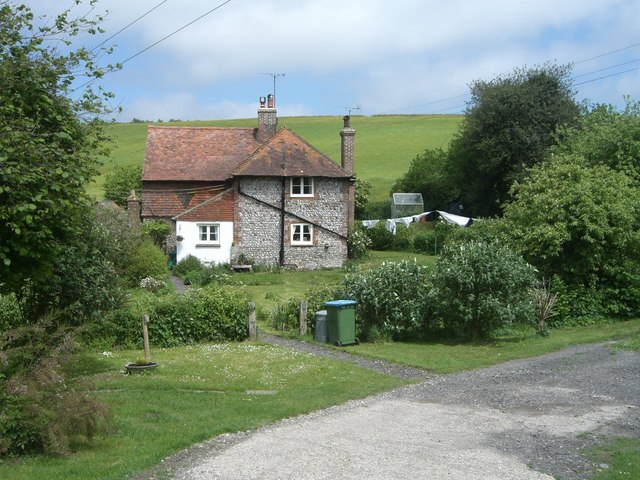
Pest house in Findon, England

There are nine surviving pest houses, including:

- Findon, West Sussex
- Odiham
- Grantham, Lincs.

Deddington, Oxfordshire has a Pest House Field.

Richmond, London has a Pesthouse common.

- Great Chart, Kent
- Cranbrook, Kent
- Collier Street, Kent

=== United States ===
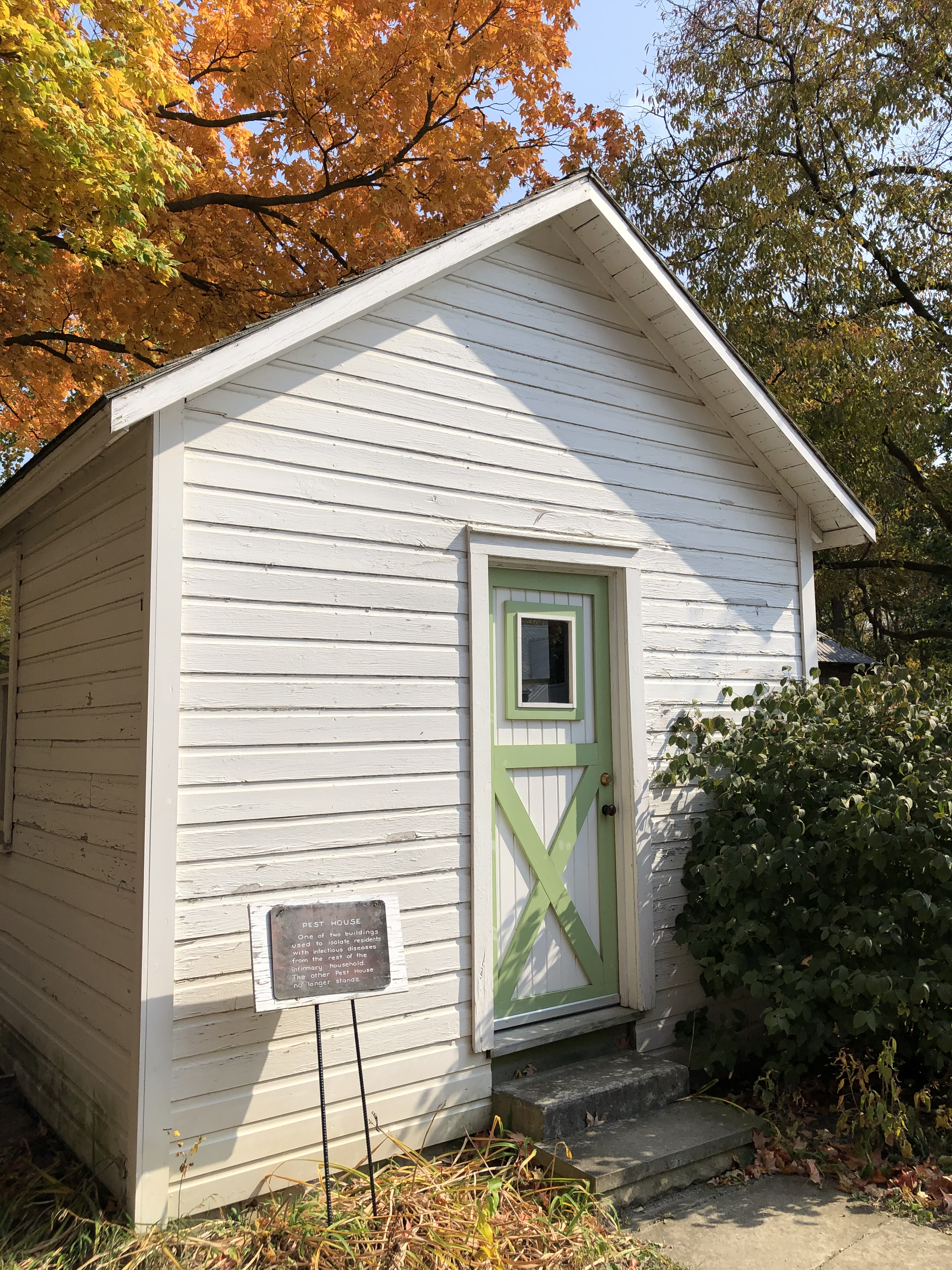
The Pest House in Wood County, Ohio, US.

- Pest House (Cockeysville, Maryland)
- Pest House (Concord, Massachusetts)
- Pest House (Stillwater, Minnesota)
- Pest House (Knappton, Washington)
- 7.3 Ma'am Pest House (Redwood City, California)
- Pest House (Old City Cemetery, Lynchburg, Virginia)
- Pest House at the Wood County Museum

== See also ==
- Lazaretto
- Death or Canada, a Canadian-Irish docudrama partly set in fever sheds in Canada
- Social distancing
