= List of martial arts =

There are many distinct styles and schools of martial arts. Sometimes, schools or styles are introduced by individual teachers or masters, or as a brand name by a specific gym. Martial arts can be grouped by type or focus, or alternatively by regional origin. This article focuses on the latter grouping of these unique styles of martial arts.

For Hybrid martial arts, as they originated from the late 19th century and especially after 1950, it may be impossible to identify unique or predominant regional origins. It is not trivial to distinguish "traditional" from "modern" martial arts. Chronology is not the decisive criterion, as, for example, "traditional" Taekwondo was developed in the 1950s, while the "modern" hybrid martial art of Bartitsu was developed c. 1900.

A large portion of traditional martial arts can be categorized as Folk wrestling (see the separate article), although in some cases a folk wrestling style and a modern combat sport may overlap or become indistinguishable from each other once the sport has been regulated.

== Afro-Eurasia ==
=== Africa ===
Angola

- Engolo

Egypt

- Tahtib

Madagascar

- Moraingy

Nigeria

- Dambe

Senegal

- Lutte Traditionnelle
- Senegalese wrestling

Somalia

- Istunka

South Africa

- Nguni stick-fighting

Sudan

- Nuba fighting

=== Europe ===
Austria

- Ranggeln

Finland

- Hokutoryu Ju-Jutsu

France

- Canne de combat
- French school of fencing
- Gouren
- Qwan Ki Do
- Savate
- Greco-Roman wrestling

Germany

- German Ju-Jutsu
- German school of fencing
- Ringen
- Unifight

Greece

- Ancient Greek boxing (Pygmachía)
- Greek wrestling (Pále)
- Pankration

Iceland

- Glima

Italy

- Italian martial arts
- Italian school of fencing

Ireland

- Irish martial arts
- Bataireacht
- Collar-and-elbow

The Netherlands

- Dutch Kickboxing

Poland

- Koluchstyle

Portugal

- Jogo do Pau

Russia

- Russian martial arts
- Sambo
- Systema
- ARB (martial art)
- Unifight

Serbia

- Real Aikido

Spain

- Leonese wrestling
- Lucha Canaria

Switzerland

- Schwingen

Ukraine

- Combat Hopak

United Kingdom

- Bare-knuckle boxing
- Bartitsu
- Boxing
- Catch wrestling
- Combat pistol shooting
- Cornish wrestling
- Cumberland and Westmorland wrestling
- Defendu
- Devon wrestling
- English Longsword School
- Historical fencing in Scotland
- Lancashire wrestling
- Suffrajitsu
- Singlestick
- Shin-kicking
- Scottish backhold

Others

- Historical European Martial Arts
- Archery
- Armored combat (sport)
- Duel
- Fencing
- Shooting
- MMA

=== Asia ===
Bangladesh

- Bangladeshi martial arts
- Butthan

Cambodia

- Bokator
- Pradal serey
- Kbach Kun Khmer Boran

China (PRC)/Taiwan (ROC)

- List of Chinese martial arts
  - Chinese/Taiwanese martial arts
  - Shaolin Kung Fu
  - Baguazhang
  - Tai chi
  - Bajiquan
  - Wing Chun
  - Shuai Jiao
  - Choy Gar
  - Fut Gar
  - Sanda
  - Hung Gar
  - Choy Li Fut

India

- Indian martial arts
- Mardani khel
- Malla-yuddha
- Kalaripayattu
- Vajra-mushti
- Adimurai
- Gatka
- Aki Kiti
- Huiyen Lallong
  - Thang-Ta
  - Sarit Sarak

Indonesia

- Indonesian martial arts
- Kuntao
- Pencak silat
- Tarung Derajat

Iran

- Varzesh-e Bastani

Israel

- Kapap
- Krav Maga

Japan

- List of Japanese martial arts
  - Japanese martial arts
  - Aikido
  - Bajutsu
  - Bojutsu
  - Okinawan kobudo
  - Iaido
  - Judo
  - Jujutsu
  - Jukendo
  - Karate
  - Kendo
  - Kenjutsu
  - Kūdō
  - Kusarigamajutsu
  - Kyudo
  - Kyujutsu
  - Kyusho jitsu
  - Ninjutsu
  - Naginatajutsu
  - Taidō
  - Tantojutsu
  - Tessenjutsu
  - Shurikenjutsu
  - Sojutsu
  - Sumo
  - Yoseikan budō

Korea

- Korean martial arts
- Gongkwon Yusul
- Choi Kwang Do
- Ssireum
- Kyukgido
- Kyeok Too Ki
- Kunguk-Do
- Hwa Rang Do
- Kuk Sool Won
- Kumdo
- Kyeok Sul
- Subak
- Taekkyon
- Taekwondo
- Tang Soo Do
- Hap ki do
- Yongmudo

Laos

- Muay Lao

Malaysia

- Kuntao
- Tomoi
- Silat

Mongolia

- Mongolian wrestling

Myanmar

- Lethwei
- Bando
- Banshay
- Naban
- Pongyi thaing

Philippines

- Filipino martial arts
- Arnis, Eskrima, and Kali
- Buno (wrestling)
- Dumog
- Kombatan
- Kuntao
- Latigo y Daga
- Sikaran
- Suntukan
- Yaw-Yan

Sri Lanka

- Angampora
- Cheena di

Thailand

- Krabi–krabong
- Lerdrit
- Muay boran
- Muay Thai
- Silat Pattani

Turkey

- Matrak
- Oil wrestling
- Sayokan

Vietnam

- Vietnamese martial arts
- Vovinam
- Nhất Nam
- Cuong Nhu

== Oceania ==
Australia

- Coreeda

New Zealand

- Mau rākau

Hawaii

- Kajukenbo
- Kapu Kuialua

Samoa

- Limalama

== America ==
=== North America ===
Barbados

- Bajan stick-licking

Canada

- Defendo
- Okichitaw
- SPEAR System
- Wen-Do

Haiti

- Tire machèt

Mexico

- Lucha libre
- Mexican Boxing

United States

- American Kenpo
- American Kickboxing
- Chulukua
- Collegiate wrestling
- Combatives
- Danzan-ryū Jujitsu
- Emerson Combat Systems
- Gouging (fighting style)
- Jeet Kune Do
- Jailhouse rock (fighting style)
- LINE (combat system)
- Marine Corps Martial Arts Program
- Model Mugging
- Shootfighting
- Small Circle JuJitsu
- Special Combat Aggressive Reactionary System
- 10th Planet Jiu-Jitsu

=== South America ===
Brazil

- Brazilian jiu-jitsu
- Capoeira
- Huka-huka
- Creole Knife Fight - (in port. "Esgrima Crioula")
- Luta Livre
- Vale Tudo

Colombia

- Colombian grima

Cuba

- Juego de maní

Peru

- Bakom

== See also ==
- List of martial arts weapons
- List of practice weapons
- Outline of martial arts
- List of sports
