= Barróg =

Irish folk wrestling style

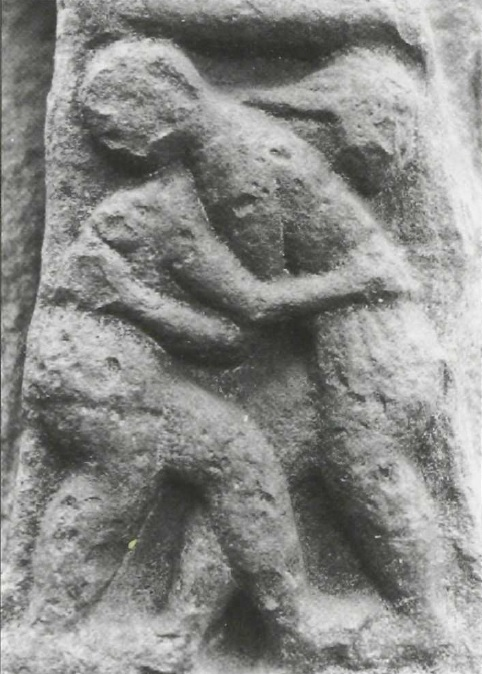
- Barróg depicted on the Market High Cross of Kells (9th century AD)
- Also known as: Barrogue
- Focus: Grappling
- Country of origin: Ireland
- Olympic sport: No

Barróg was a style of folk wrestling practiced in Ireland until the early 20th century. It was a type of backhold wrestling, similar to Scottish Backhold and Cumberland and Westmorland wrestling.

== Name ==
In the Irish language, the word “barróg” simply means “hug” or “embrace”. From there, it came to be used as the Irish name for backhold wrestling, in reference to the fact that both competitors were required to engage with each other in a chest-to-chest, hug-like clinch.

Occasionally the style was referred to by the anglicised version of its name - Barrogue. On at least one occasion, it was misspelled in an American source as “Borrogbe wrestling”.

== History ==
There are several folk wrestling styles of Western Europe and Northern Europe that involve competitors taking each other in a backhold clinch, such as the aforementioned Scottish Backhold and Cumberland and Westmorland styles, as well as a now-extinct variant of Icelandic Glima known as hryggspenna (“back-spanning”) or Sardinian Strumpa. It is unknown exactly when Barróg arose – or arrived – in Ireland, but there are carved depictions of figures in recognisable backhold clinches dating as far back as the 9th century AD.

The characteristic backhold grip is mentioned in two separate 15th-century accounts of battlefield wrestling - one in the Cath Finntrágha and another in the Táin Bó Flidhais. The Mac Suibhne (Sweeney) clan of County Donegal incorporated backhold wrestling imagery on a 16th-century memorial slab for one of their more prominent members, Niall Mór Mac Suibhne. The same clan once used a wrestling match to decide a dispute over leadership. Such matches were a common form of entertainment in more recreational settings as well, as evidenced by Irish genealogist Edward MacLysaght's description of competitors at a 17th-century country fair wrestling in what he called a “hug” position.

By the 18th and 19th century, Irish wrestling both at home and abroad had become dominated largely by the Collar and Elbow style, but there are records of Barróg matches persisting in the west of Ireland until the early decades of the 20th century.

== Rules ==
There is no record of any written ruleset for Barróg, so it is unclear exactly how bouts were conducted. Given the extent to which the other backhold styles of Europe resemble each other, it is probable that Barróg contests utilised a similar framework. That is, an entirely standing style of wrestling in which one competitor wins when they make the other touch the ground with anything other than the soles of their feet. This is supported by an account of backhold wrestling from County Sligo that appears in the Irish Folklore Commission's Schools' Collection.

"Wrestling is another game we play. The way to play it is - two boys take each other by the back and try to throw each other. Whoever falls first loses the game."

In addition, it was noted that Barróg in the west of Ireland had certain features in common with the backhold wrestling practised in the Hebrides, such as the phrase uttered by referees at the beginning of a bout: "Lámh in íochdar, lámh in uachdar" ("One hand down, one hand up").

== Gallery ==
Depictions of Barróg
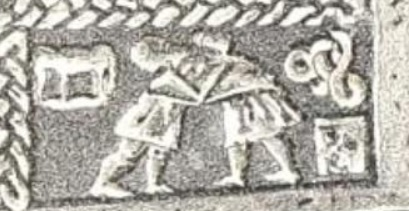
The 16th-century Clan Sweeney tomb slab in Killybegs

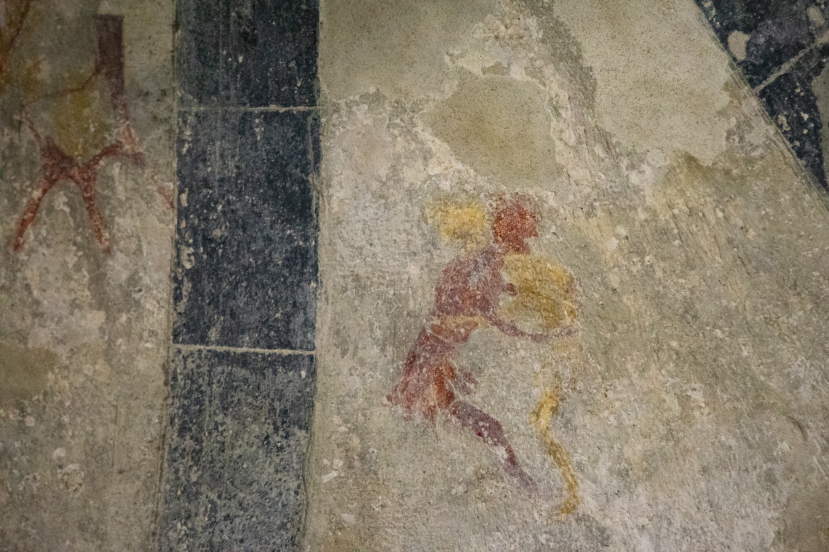
Mural in Clare Island Abbey

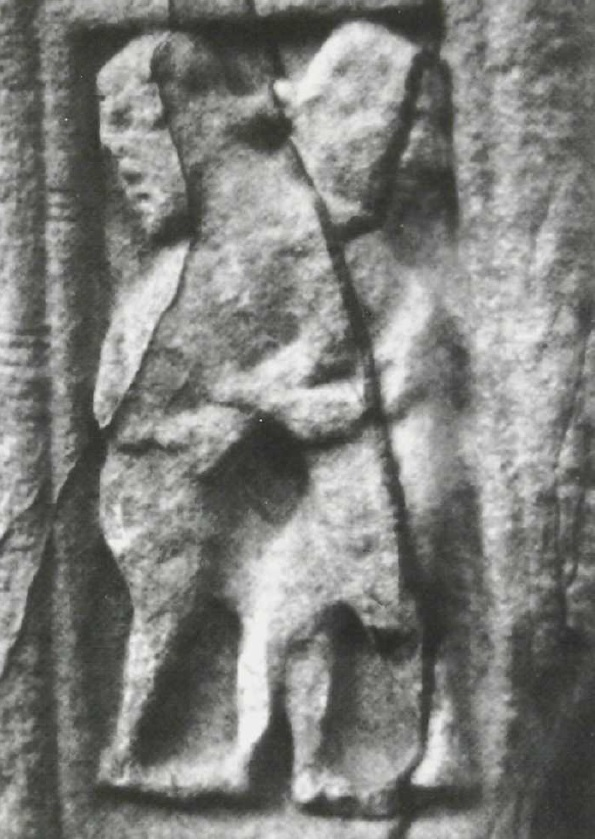
The High Cross of Durrow

== See also ==
- Collar-and-elbow
- Scottish Backhold
- Cornish wrestling
- Cumberland and Westmorland wrestling
