= Festival Interceltique de Lorient =

Celtic arts festival in Brittany

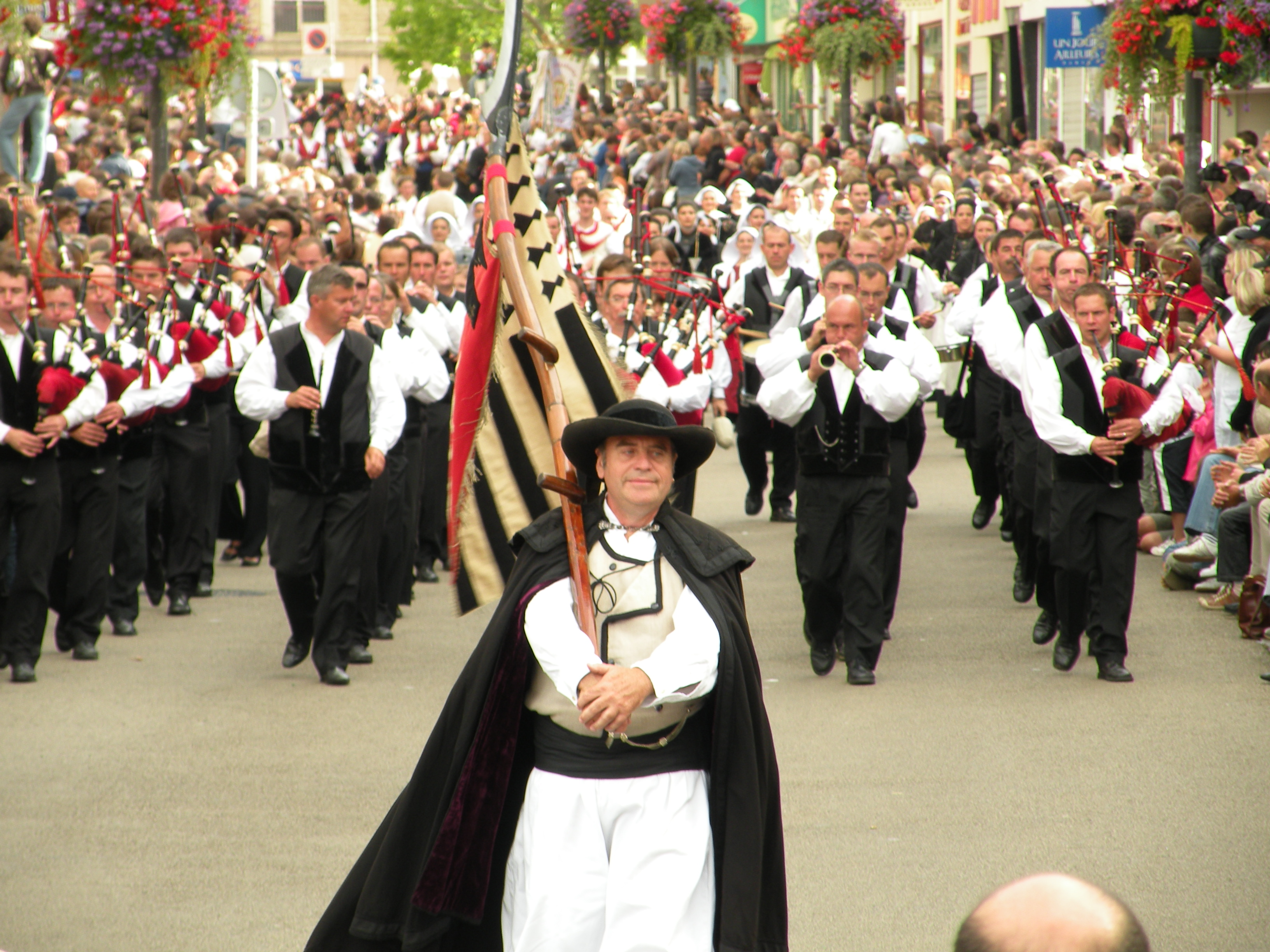
- Kevrenn Alre, a Breton musical group
- Genre: Celtic
- Dates: First week of August
- Locations: Lorient, France
- Years active: 1970–present
- Website: www.festival-interceltique.bzh

The Festival interceltique de Lorient (French), Emvod Ar Gelted An Oriant (Breton) or Inter-Celtic Festival of Lorient in English, is an annual Celtic festival, located in the city of Lorient, Brittany, France. It was founded in 1971 by Polig Monjarret.

This annual festival takes place in the heart of the city every August and is dedicated to the cultural traditions of the Celtic nations (pays celtes in French), highlighting Celtic music and dance and also including other arts such as painting, photography, theatre, sculpture, traditional artisanry as well as sport and gastronomy.

Participants come from Brittany, Ireland, Wales, Scotland, Cornwall, Cumbria, the Isle of Man, Cape Breton Island, Galicia, Asturias, Acadia, and the entire Celtic diaspora.

== Programme of events ==
The main festival sites are located throughout the city, with more formal events taking place at the Palais des Congrès, Grand Théâtre or Église Saint Louis. The larger events take place at the Parc du Moustoir (the home of FC Lorient which can hold up to 10,000 spectators), the Port de Pêche or in grand marquees.

The festival begins with the Cotriade (fr) or Kaoteriad (br), a traditional Breton seafood supper, which takes place in the Port de Pêche (fr) or Porzh Pesketa (br) harbour district accompanied by sea shanties and traditional Breton marine music.

On Sunday morning the Grand Parade of Celtic Nations takes place with over 3,500 musicians, singers, pipebands and dancers from all over the Celtic world parading through the city streets in national costume.

The finals of the National Bagadoù Championship takes place at the Parc de Moustoir during the first weekend of the festival. In addition individual competitions take place for pipers.

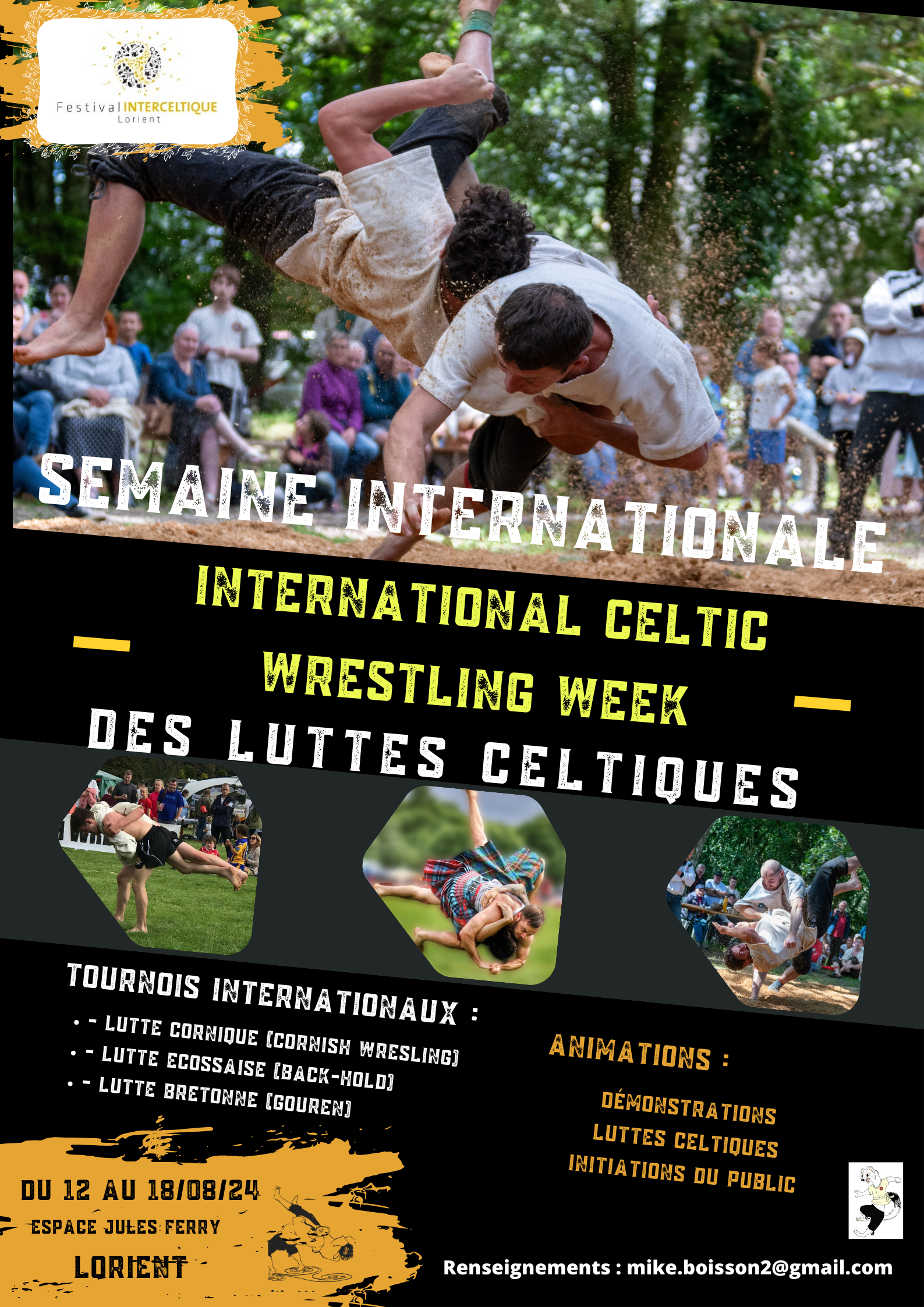
Celtic wrestling tournaments

There are demonstrations and tournaments in celtic wrestling (Gouren, Cornish wrestling and Scottish backhold) with representatives from the Celtic nations taking part.

Master classes take place each morning. Afternoon events include folk and traditional music concerts and dance displays. Evening events include orchestral concerts, rock concerts and nuits magiques, displays of pipe bands, dancers, choirs and fireworks.

Throughout the festival the Village Celtique (fr) or Marc'had Etrekeltiek (br) is open in the centre of the city offering food, music and literature, clothing and crafts.

On the final Saturday of the festival folk and rock musicians perform at the fishing harbour for the Nuit du Port de Pêche.

There is also much activity on the festival fringe, with musicians giving free performances in many of the city’s bars and pubs every evening until late.

The festival also hosts Grande Parade des Nations Celtes, a parade that marches through the streets of the Lorient while the participants play instruments and wear their cultural attire.

The festival organisers have more recently embarked on similar ventures such as the St Patrick's Day concert in Paris, France, which attracts a crowd of 70,000 spectators and the Celtica concert in Nantes, Brittany.

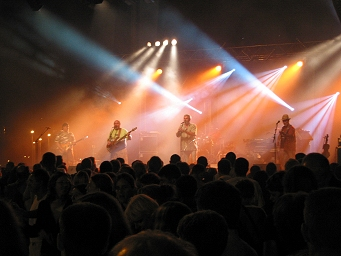
Lorient Interceltic Festival in Brittany

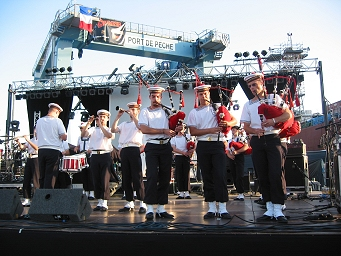
Bagad of Lann-Bihoué at Lorient Interceltic Festival in Brittany

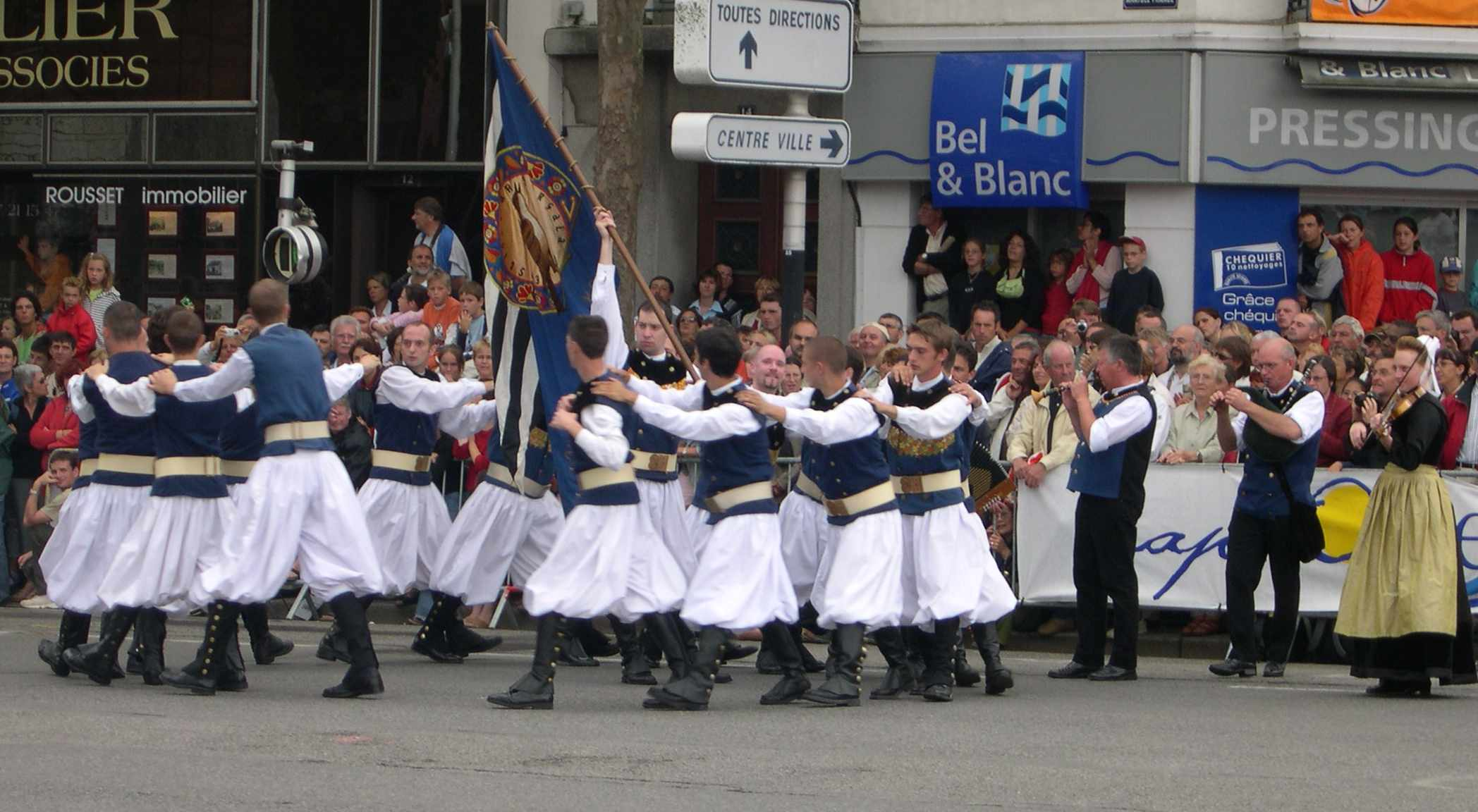
Dances

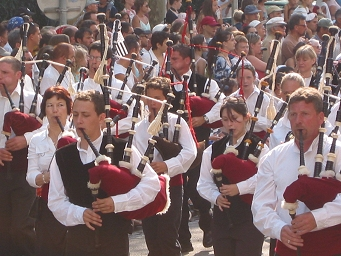
Lorient Interceltic Festival

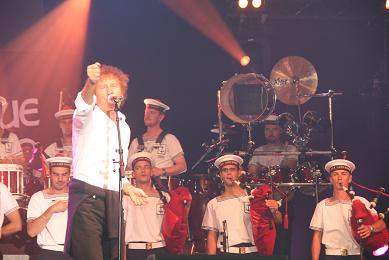
Alain Souchon and the Lann-Bihoué's bagad, in 2007

== See also ==
- List of Celtic festivals
- Kernewek Lowender – the world's largest Cornish festival
- History of Lorient
- Gabriel Hotel
