= Brazilian martial arts =

Brazilian martial arts may refer to:

- Brazilian jiu-jitsu, a martial art, combat sport, and a self-defense system that focuses on grappling and especially ground fighting
- Capoeira, an Angolan and Brazilian martial art that combines elements of dance, acrobatics and music
- Vale tudo (English: anything goes) are full-contact unarmed combat events, with a limited number of rules, that became popular in Brazil during the 20th century, later begin an influence to the development of MMA
- Luta Livre, a self-defense martial-art mixture of Catch Wrestling and Judo, divided between Esportivo (Sports) and Vale Tudo (Anything goes) styles
- Huka-huka, a form of indigenous folk wrestling practiced by the Yawalapiti people
- Tarracá, a form of folk wrestling from the Brazilian northeast
