= Narodno rvanje =

Serbian style of traditional wrestling

- Also known as: Serbian Wrestling
- Focus: Wrestling
- Country of origin: Serbia
- Olympic sport: No

Narodno rvanje (lit. folk wrestling) is a style of traditional wrestling in Serbia.

In Narodno rvanje it is usual to begin a match with opponents stepping into the ring and taking one of the following holds :

- Back hold : the wrestlers lock the arms behind opponents back in full fingers grip.
- Belt hold : the wrestlers grab each other's belts or pants.
- Chest hold : this hold has two variations:
  - The wrestlers start by putting their arms on the side of their opponent's chest, or
  - Right arm on the side of their opponent's chest and hold opponent's right elbow with their left arm.

But the opponents may disengage from the holds and start as it is usual in other styles such as Greco-Roman wrestling depending on the rules of the tournament. The objective is to throw and pin your opponent to the ground. All types of throws are legal, and even double leg take-down can be seen. And on some festivals the wrestlers may even wear traditional clothing from their respective area as effort to preserve culture.

== See also ==
- Sport in Serbia
