= Folk wrestling =

Traditional wrestling styles

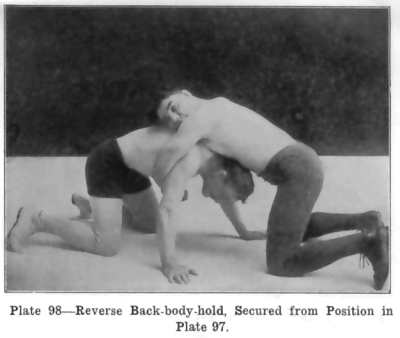
Two wrestlers demonstrating a wrestling technique, 1913

A folk wrestling style is any traditional style of wrestling. Most cultures have developed regional forms of grappling.

== Europe ==
=== Britain ===
Traditionally wrestling has two main centres in Great Britain: the West Country, where the Devon and Cornwall styles were developed, and in the Northern counties; the home of the Cumberland and Westmorland styles and Catch wrestling.

==== North Country styles ====
- Lancashire wrestling is a historic wrestling style from Lancashire in England known for its "Catch-as-catch-can", or no wrestling holds barred, style.
  - Catch wrestling, or Catch-as-catch-can, originated from Lancashire wrestling but was further developed during the travelling circus phenomenon of the 19th and early 20th century.
- Backhold Wrestling, whose origin is unknown, was practised in North England and Scotland in the 7th and 8th century but competitions are held in present-day at the Highland and Border Games as well as in France and Italy. Styles of Backhold are distinct from Lancashire Wrestling because they enforce rules designed to minimize injury to the participants by disallowing ground fighting.
  - Cumberland and Westmorland wrestling, or Cumbrian Wrestling, is practised in the northern counties of England. It is a form of Backhold Wrestling where the wrestlers put the left arm over the opponents right arm and grip behind the opponent's back. Throws and trips are important since the first wrestler to touch the ground or break hold loses. Competitors often wear stockings (long johns), singlet and trunks.
  - Scottish Backhold is a form of Backhold practised in Scotland. Almost identical in style to Cumberland & Westmorland style apart from variations in rules. Competitors often wear kilts.

==== West Country styles ====
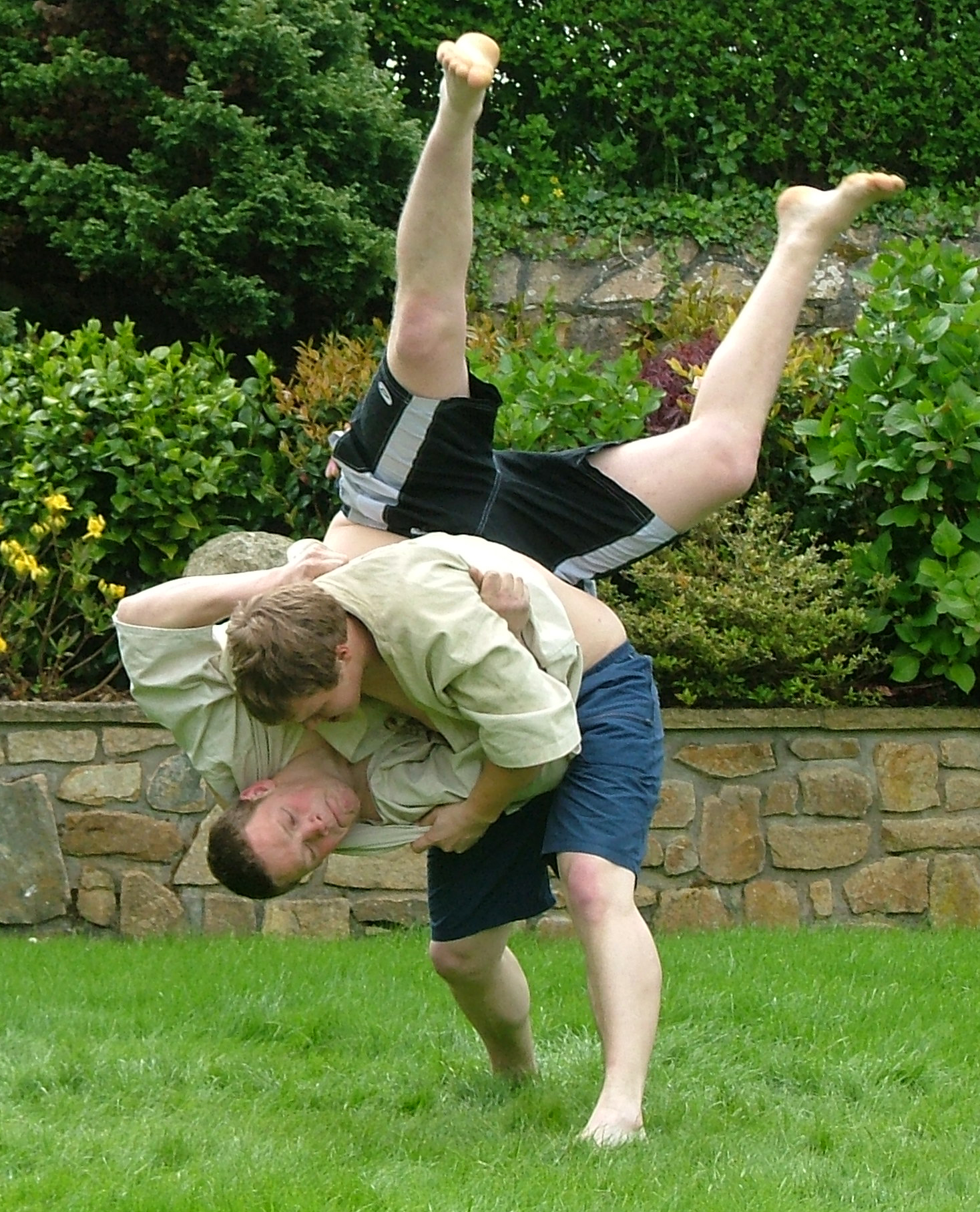
Cornish wrestling in Cornwall, 2006.

- Cornish wrestling, originating from Cornwall, is a form of jacket wrestling. It does not use groundwork. It is related to Breton Gouren wrestling. From the late Middle Ages it became very popular throughout Britain and then spread through the world in the 18th and 19th centuries, with regular tournaments and matches throughout the US, Australia, South Africa, France and New Zealand and with less frequent tournaments in Ireland, India, Brazil, Canada, Mexico and Japan.
- Devon wrestling, or Devonshire wrestling, was a style similar to the Cornish style in that jackets were worn. Devonshire wrestlers, however, also wore heavy clogs and were able to kick the opponents. In matches between Cornish and Devon, Devonshire wrestlers might have worn one shoe only. Unlike Cornish wrestling, the style is generally considered to be extinct. In Cornwall, wrestling with shoes was referred to as "purring".

==== Other styles ====
- Norfolk wrestling, originating from Norfolk, is another form of jacket wrestling with no groundwork.

=== Ireland ===
- Barróg was a form of backhold wrestling practiced primarily in the west and north of Ireland. The earliest visual depictions date from the 9th century AD, and matches in the style are recorded to have taken place up until the early decades of the 20th century.
- Collar-and-elbow is a jacket wrestling style native to Ireland that can be traced back to the 17th century. It was introduced to the United States by Irish immigrants, and was one of the most popular wrestling styles practiced nationwide there for much of the 19th century.

=== Nordic countries ===
- Glíma, the national sport of Iceland and traces its history to the Vikings and the Norse. It is a standing style with rules similar to Shuai jiao and Bukh, and consists of three forms: 1) Hryggtök, the Backhold Grip; 2) Brokartök or the Pant-and-belt Grip that utilizes a leather harness around the waist and thighs, which the wrestlers hold (making it a form of belt-wrestling similar to Swiss Schwingen), and 3) Lausatök or Free-Grip is the most aggressive form of glima and contestants can use the holds they wish. It is practiced both outdoors and indoors.
- Kragkast, type of folk wrestling originating from Sweden, the wrestlers hold each other by the collar, similar to Freestyle wrestling
- Byxkast, common type of folk wrestling in Sweden, the wrestler grab each other by the belt and/or pants, related to glima
- Bröstkast, type of folk wrestling in Sweden, the wrestlers grab each other with one arm above and the other one below the opponents arms, still practiced on Gotland

=== Continental Europe ===
==== Western Europe ====
- Gouren - traditional Breton jacket wrestling. Similar to Cornish wrestling.
- Ranggeln - meaning "to wrangle" in German, Ranggeln is a prominent form of wrestling in Austria. The winner is the man who pins his opponents to the ground
- Schwingen - Swiss style of wrestling considered to be one of the oldest forms of wrestling. Wrestlers wear special canvas trousers.
- Calegon - another form of Swiss folk wrestling, whose techniques were further developed among others into freestyle wrestling

==== Southern Europe ====
- Lucha leonesa, native to the Spanish region of León, touching ground (non-foot) loses.
- Galhofa, native to Portugal, being pinned with back to the ground loses.
- Lotta Campidanesa from Italy - Sardinian collar, jacket and belt wrestling practiced by countrymen and shepherds in southern Sardinia
- Sa Strumpa: Sardinian wrestling, in Italy also known as S'Istrumpa or simply Istrumpa
- Mundja Gollobordes - a centuries-old wrestling competition in the Dibra region of Albania, where combatants fight for the top prize, a big horned ram.

==== Eastern Europe ====
- Trântă: Upright wrestling from Romania and Moldova; it can also be practiced from the knees.
- Narodno rvanje, is a wrestling style from Serbia, In Narodno Rvanje there are three disciplines, depending on the hold, they can be chest hold, belt hold or back hold.
- Pelivan is a wrestling style practiced in Albania, Serbia and Bulgaria
- Koluchstyle is a martial art wrestling style practiced in Poland

==== Northern Europe ====
- Pakištynės more practiced in North and West Lithuania.
- Ristynės more practiced in East and South Lithuania.

== Asia ==
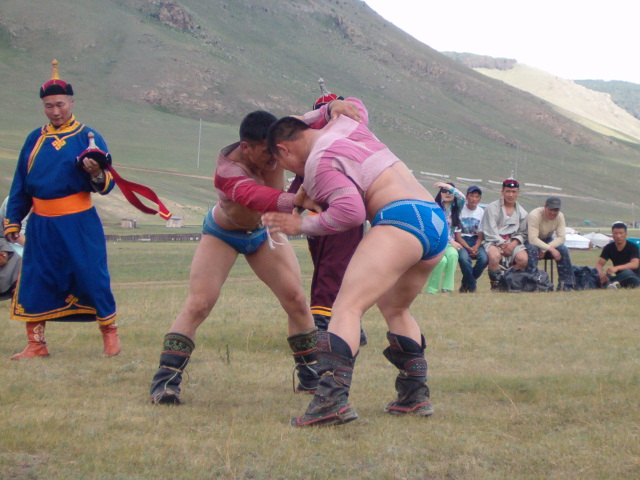
Wrestlers on the traditional Naadam festival in Mongolia, near Ulaanbaatar

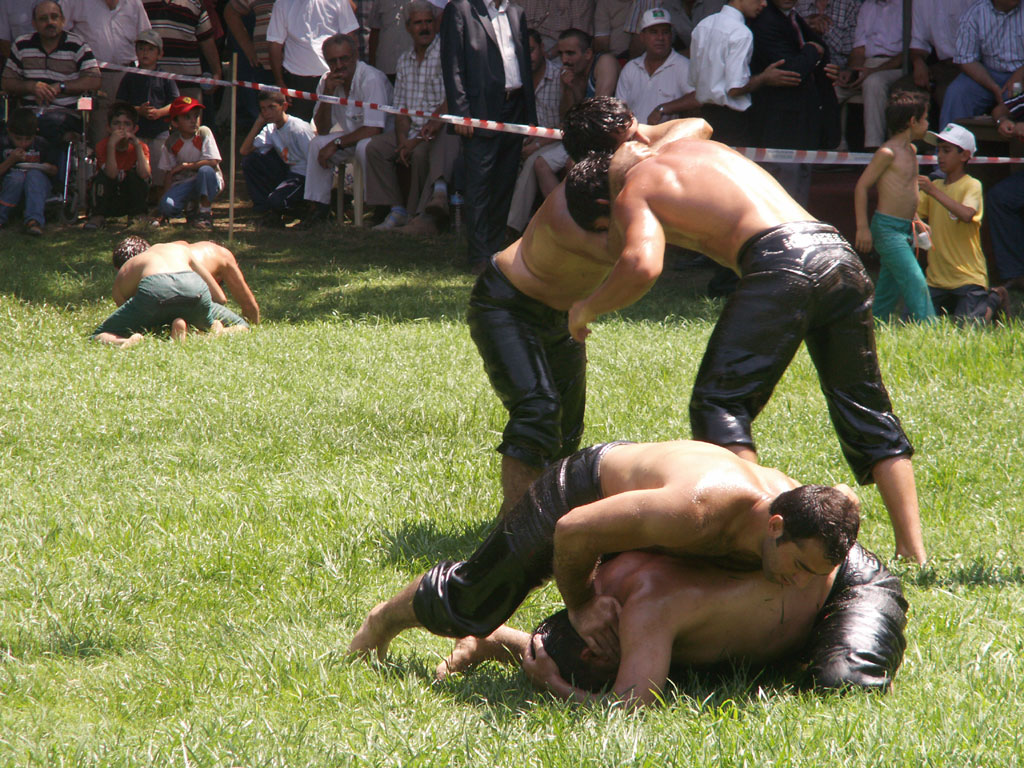
Yağlı güreş (Turkish oil wrestling) tournament in Istanbul

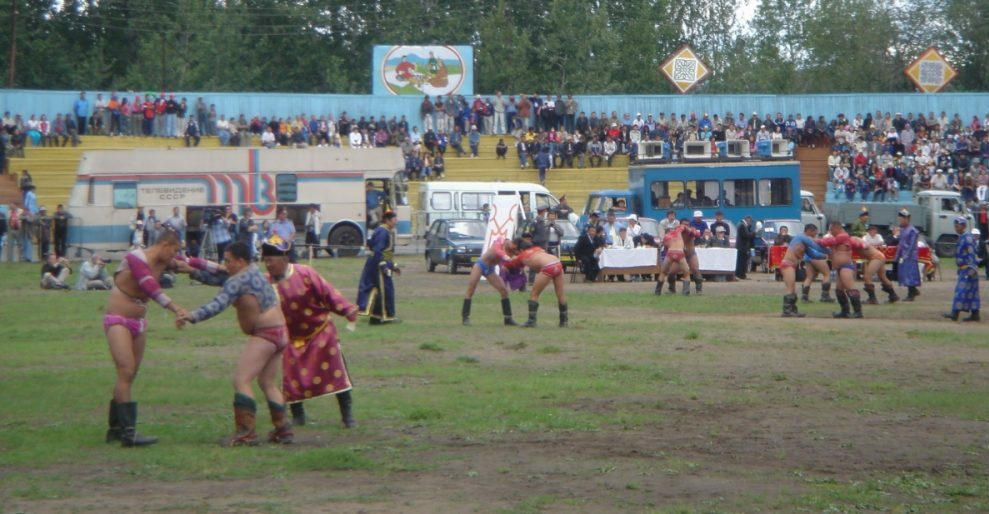
Khuresh (Tuvan wrestling)

=== Central Asia ===
==== Mongolian wrestling ====
- Bökh - (Khalkha bökh, Khalkha wrestling) traditional Khalkha Mongolian jacket wrestling where touching the ground with anything other than a foot loses the match. Bökh means "wrestling" or "wrestler" in Mongolian.
- Buryat wrestling (Buriad bökh)
- Bukh noololdoon - Oirat wrestling or Western Mongolian wrestling
- Southern Mongolian wrestling - (Üzemchin wrestling) jacket wrestling that wear jacket made of cow leather, long pants with chaps over and boots. Rules and techniques are more similar to Shuai Jiao than to Bokh practised in Mongolia, where wrestlers wear only short, tight, collarless, heavy-duty short-sleeved jacket and small, tight-fitting briefs made of red or blue colored cotton cloth.

==== Turkic wrestling ====
- Alysh, a Kyrgyz belt wrestling
- Köräş, a Tatar wrestling style
- Kurash, an Uzbek wrestling style
- Göreş, a Turkmen wrestling style
- Khuresh - traditional Tuvan jacket wrestling, in southern Siberia. Strongly influenced by Mongolian wrestling. Khalkha Mongolian and Tuvan wrestlers wear almost same jacket.
- Küres - traditional Kazakh jacket wrestling. Leg grabs are not allowed, but a wrestler may trip the legs.
- Gushtigiri - traditional Tajik jacket wrestling.

=== East Asia ===
==== China ====
- Shuai Jiao 摔跤: Chinese jacket wrestling originating from Beijing, Tianjin and Baoding in Northern Hebei which means "Throw and Trip (at the ankle)". Also known as Guan Jiao 摜跤 and Liao Jiao 撩跤, meaning "Continuing Trip (at the ankle)" and "Hold-up and Trip (at the ankle)". In Qing dynasty time it was also known as "Buku (布庫)", Manchu word for wrestling which has same roots as the Mongol word Boke. This style of wrestling was the style of martial arts practiced by imperial guards in the Liao, Jin, Yuan, Ming and Qing dynasties. The present techniques were codified by the Kangxi Emperor in the 1670s. Traditionally wrestlers wear jacket called "Da Lian (搭褳)" and chaps over their pants, which allow grabbing the chaps for lifting. In addition, Qin Na techniques such as arm-locks were allowed in Beijing, and striking and blocking using upper arms were allowed in Tianjin. Rules have since incorporated Shanxi Naoyang Jiao and modern Olympic Wrestling.
- Naoyang Jiao 挠羊跤: Chinese wrestling from Xinzhou (忻州), Northern Shanxi (山西) Province. ''Naoyang(挠羊)'' means to ''carry like sheep or cattle'', and ''Jiao(跤)'' means to throw and wrestle using the legs. This was the traditional folk-wrestling style originally based on Chinese Jiao di(角抵), meaning ''horn-clashing'' where soldiers would wear horned headgear to butt and wrestle their opponents on the battlefield. Competitors wear only pants, without a jacket or boots. Its primary techniques are the "48 Leg Takedowns", first codified in the Song dynasty circa 1180. This form of wrestling was popular throughout Northern China until the spread of Shuai Jiao, which is considered more advanced in its grappling and tripping techniques. It was colloquially known as "Mo Ni Qiu (摸泥鳅)", literally grabbing the mud Qiu, Qiu being a kind of catfish in Northern China.
- Xiang Pu 相撲：Traditional Chinese belt-wrestling style from Henan and Shaanxi provinces, also based on Chinese Jiao di(角抵), but contestants also wear a belt for both attackers to utilize belt grips for attacking the legs. Today, it is practiced between the cities Luoyang(洛阳) and Xi'an(西安). This style of wrestling was practiced by the imperial guards during the Sui and Tang dynasties, its rules and techniques were codified during the Tang Dynasty. Similar to Shanxi Naoyang Jiao, it allows holding the legs as well as pushing, butting and throwing techniques to bring the opponent off the ring or platform(lei tai), similar to a concept used in Sumo and Ssireum today.
- Qielixi 切里西: Chinese belt wrestling practiced by Uyghur Nationality.
- Gi Ge 几格: Chinese belt wrestling practiced by Yi Nationality (彝族) in Sichuan (四川) and Yunnan (雲南). "Gi Ge" literally means "Holding Waist". The three main rules are: no tripping using the legs; no grabbing the jacket or pants; no pushing or striking. Rules have now been changed to allow holding the legs.
- Ndrual Dluad: Chinese wrestling practiced by Miao/Hmong Nationality throughout Southwestern China. A belt wrestling style, competitors can wear traditional dress or modern dress but they must hold on to the belt at all times.
- Beiga 北嘎: Chinese belt wrestling practiced by the Tibetan people. Also known as "Jiazhe (加哲)" and "Youri (有日)" in Tibet, "Xiezhe (寫澤)" in Western Sichuan, and "Jiareze (卡惹則)" in Qinghai. It is a form of belt wrestling. Wrestlers compete barefoot and must hold the belt at all times. No tripping is allowed. Leg trips were introduced circa the 13th century, making 2 distinct forms.

==== Other countries ====
- Sumo: Japanese wrestling based on forcing the opponent out of the ring or to touch the ground with anything other than the soles of the feet. Sumo is notable for allowing slaps and strikes with the open palm. The rules were codified during the Tokugawa Shogunate and were based on Xiang-Pu 相撲, the Chinese wrestling style during the Tang dynasty.
- Jujutsu: Ancient style of Japanese wrestling that focuses on throws, pins, chokes and joint locks. Further refined by samurai during the violent Sengoku Period.
- Ssireum: Korean belt wrestling contested in a sand pit
- Tegumi is the folk wrestling practiced in Okinawa.
- Mariwariwosu, the indigenous style of the Formosan Aboriginal people of Taiwan such as the Paiwan and Bunun tribes. Performed on a circular sandpit with competitors grabbing hold of their opponents large waist belts before the start of the match it involves many skillful throws and is an important part of the National Aboriginal Games.

=== Western Asia ===
- Gulesh - a traditional Azerbaijani wrestling style
- Iranian Wrestling or Koshti. Includes the Iran-wide Pahlavani, and numerous other provincial styles.
- Karakucak Güreşi. Traditional Turkish wrestling style. Rules are similar to Olympic freestyle wrestling.
- Yağlı Güreşi. "Oil Wrestling". Wrestlers wear special leather trousers 'kispet' and are oiled.
- Khridoli and Chidaoba - traditional Georgian combined martial arts and wrestling
- Kokh - a traditional Armenian style of wrestling

=== South Asia ===
- Boli Khela is a traditional form of wrestling from Bangladesh.
- Gatta gusthi, a traditional form of wrestling common in Kerala, India.
- Kabaddi, Kaudi, Hadudu, or Hututu is a form of South Asian folk wrestling that stems from ancient traditions.
- Kene is the traditional wrestling style in the state of Nagaland.
- Inbuan is the traditional wrestling style of the Mizoram state of India.
- Malakhra or Malakhro is the South Asian form of sport wrestling found mostly in Pakistan and India.
- Malla-yuddha, traditional styles extant in South India.
- Mukna is a form of folk wrestling from the north-east Indian state of Manipur.
- Pehlwani or Kushti is the mughal style of wrestling from India.
- Vajra-mushti, a form of Indian wrestling in which the weapon is employed.

=== Southeast Asia ===
- Naban: Burmese wrestling.
- Bok Cham Bab is a folk wrestling style from Cambodia.
- Benjang Gulat is a Sundanese form of wrestling popular in rural Indonesia.
- Đấu vật or Vật cổ truyền: Vietnamese wrestling. Origins from Hà Tây province of North Vietnam
- Bultong, the indigenous style of the Igorot People in Northern Luzon of the Philippine archipelago.
- Buno, the indigenous style of the Aeta people and the Mangyan peoples in Central & Southern Luzon of the Philippine archipelago.
- Dumog, the indigenous style of the Visayan Islands of the Philippine archipelago.

== Americas ==
- Marajoara Wrestling, Brazilian style. Grappling, practiced in northern Brazil. https://pt.wikipedia.org/wiki/Luta_marajoara
- Collegiate Wrestling, also known as "folkstyle" wrestling, is a style from the United States that incorporates many different wrestling techniques from different styles into one.
- Lucha Libre, Mexican style of pro wrestling.
- Huka-huka, style of wrestling practiced by the indigenous Yawalapiti people of the Amazon basin.
- Professional wrestling combines athletics with theatrical performance. The matches have predetermined outcomes to heighten entertainment value.
- Tinku, Bolivian fight style.

== Africa ==
- Lucha canaria - A style of wrestling originating from the guanches culture in the Canary Islands that was taken and further developed by Spanish colonists
- Lutte Traditionnelle (fr. for Traditional Wrestling) - Related styles of West African wrestling, known as Laamb in Senegal, Boreh in The Gambia, Evala in Togo, and Lutte Traditionnelle in Niger and Burkina Faso. International competitions for the sport take place during the Jeux de la Francophonie and the newly organised Championnat d'Afrique de lutte traditionnelle.
- Tigel - Traditional wrestling of Ethiopia.
- Grech - Traditional wrestling practiced in Tunisia
- Gidigbo - A form of traditional wrestling, augmented by the use of martial mysticism, which is practiced by the Yoruba people of Nigeria.

== Oceania ==
- Coreeda, a modern reconstruction that combines traditional Aboriginal dance, mainly in the form of kangaroo mimicry, with a style of wrestling performed around a yellow 4.5m diameter circle with black and red borders similar to the Aboriginal flag. Competitors wear knee length pants, a wide sash belt and a jersey that can be grabbed to assist in throws. It is based on similar games that were played in pre-colonial Australia and is usually performed during NAIDOC in the Western Suburbs of Sydney. Extinct indigenous Australian styles include turdererin from Southern Victoria, partambelin from Southern NSW, goombooboodoo from Western NSW, ami from Southern QLD and donaman/arungga from Northern QLD.
- Epoo korio, a friendly style of wrestling done on Kiwai Island in the Fly River Delta of Western Province of Papua New Guinea, involved one wrestler who had to defend a small mound of sand which his opponent was trying to destroy.
- Boumwane, the national style of Kiribati with a simple toppling victory performed during National Day celebrations, a similar sport is also played in Nauru.
- Fagatua, the indigenous style of Tokelau used mainly to settle regional disputes between villages.
- Hokoko, the indigenous style of the Kanaka Maoli of the Hawaii Islands, first recorded by crew members during HMS Resolution's 1779 visit to the main island as part of the pa'ani'kahiko or 'ancient games', performed during the Makahiki New Year Festival. Along with mokomoko boxing it is a core skill of the bone breaking martial art of lua.
- Rongomamau, the indigenous style of the Maori of New Zealand, this unarmed art was used for warrior training, conflict resolution and was used against armed Warriors during battle. Based on the movements of the Maori Gods of nature, this art is still practised by those trained by Te Whare Ahuru Rongomamau. Umutakarangi Timoti Pahi is the last living teacher of this art.
- Moana, the indigenous style of the Ma'ohi of Tahiti and French Polynesia; along with teka (spear throwing), motora'a (boxing) and amoraa ofae (heavy stone lifting) will be included as part of the Heiva i Tahiti or traditional sports festival held in Papeete every July. A similar sport is also played in the Cook Islands during the Te Maeva Nui national day celebrations.
- Pi'i tauva, the indigenous style of the Kingdom of Tonga was first seen by Europeans in 1777 in which the artist John Webber recorded in lithograph. It combined boxing and wrestling, being performed as entertainment for visitors by both men and women.
- Popoko, the indigenous style of the Maori of the Cook Islands, is an ancient traditional form of wrestling on the island of Pukapuka. The young men don thick belts called maro that are woven from coconut fibre and in a ritualistic procession, annually they march from their villages to a communal meeting ground. When a man wins a match, the entire village sings a tila or a wrestling chant from their village.
- Taupiga, the indigenous style of the Samoan Islands saw the wrestlers greased up with coconut oil before competitions (similar to Turkish yagli gures) and was an important part of the inter-village gatherings.
- Uma, also known as Kulakula'i, is a hand-wrestling game practiced by the indigenous residents of Hawaii. The contestants kneel and grasp each other's elbows on the same side. The object is to force one's opponent's arm to the ground. The game was frequently played by the Hawaiian ruling class (the Ali'i).
- Veibo, the indigenous style of Fiji was mainly used as a method of warrior training but also occasionally as a form of entertainment. In the early 20th century, indentured labourers were brought from India to work the cane fields and their style of wrestling, kushti, was fused with veibo to create a hybrid style similar to freestyle wrestling.

== Footnotes ==
Luta marajoara e memória: práticas "esquecidas" na educação física escolar em Soure-Marajó https://e-revista.unioeste.br/index.php/cadernoedfisica/article/view/19262

== Sources ==
- The Wrestler's Body: Identity and Ideology in North India by Joseph S. Alter (1992). ISBN 0-520-07697-4
