= Gouren =

Style of folk wrestling of Brittany, France

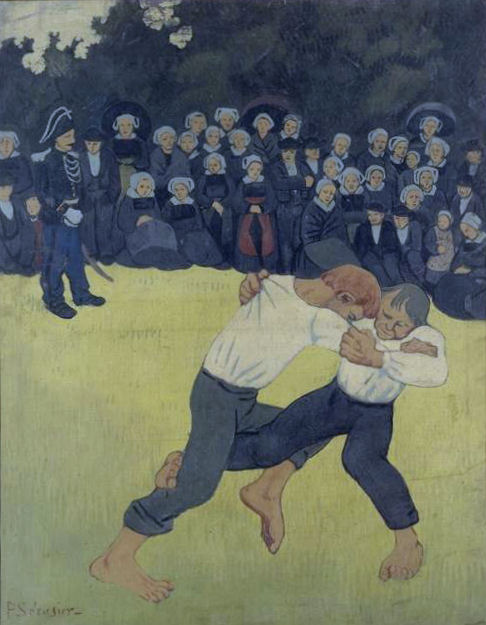
- Breton Wrestling
- Also known as: Gouren or Lutte Bretonne
- Focus: Grappling
- Country of origin: Brittany, France
- Creator: Various
- Olympic sport: No

Gouren is a style of folk wrestling which has been established in Brittany for several centuries. It is practiced mainly in Brittany, but also in some neighboring regions, in particular through international meetings organized by the FILC (Fédération Internationale des Luttes Celtiques), for example in Cornwall, in Scotland and a Gouren skol has opened in New Orleans, in the United States.

In today's France, Gouren is overseen by the Fédération de Gouren which has an agreement with the Fédération Française de Lutte (French Wrestling Federation).

Gouren is a standing wrestling art with a shirt on mat ("pallen"). As soon as one of the wrestlers touches the ground with a part of the body other than his feet, the fight is stopped, the protagonists get up, then resume the fight after shaking hands.

== History ==
=== Origins ===
Wrestling (gouren in Breton) was used by most European armies before the use of firearms. Thus, when Briton immigrants settled massively in Armorica in the 4th century, it is probable that they brought with them martial techniques which, added to local ones, gradually led to the gouren that arose in the late Middle Ages. If it was undoubtedly originally mainly practiced by the nobles and the people of arms, the gouren was then borrowed, mainly after the Renaissance and the arrival of firearms, by the common people, as a popular fun practice. The archives tell us that many "minor nobles" excelled in this art, sometimes fighting with peasants or millers. Its organization was generally subject to seigniorial authorizations and it preserved from its noble origins the aiguillettes, gloves and doublets, trophies which were offered to victors until the French Revolution.

The term gouren is mentioned as early as 1464 in the Catholicon, the very first trilingual dictionary.

Writings by Ambroise Paré describe the Breton wrestling in 1543 as it was then practiced in western Brittany.

=== 19th century ===
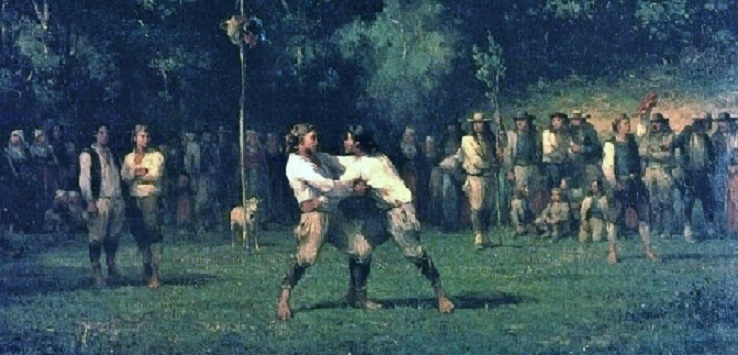
Adolphe Pierre Leleux, Jour de fête en Cornouaille ou Lutteurs de Basse-Bretagne, 1864

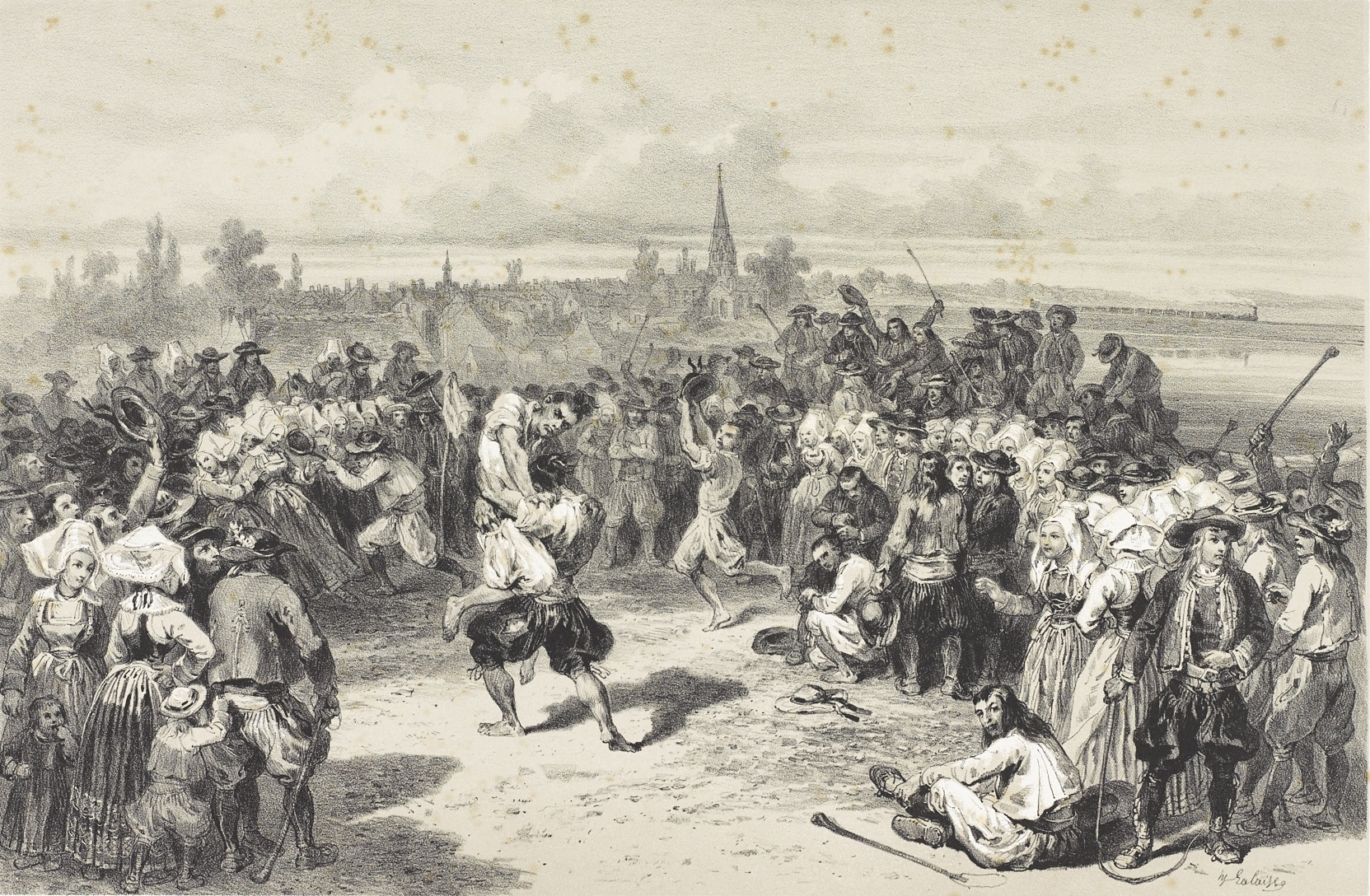
Hippolyte Lalaisse : Breton wrestling scene taking place around 1860 near the Rosporden pond. Two wrestlers grapple while others rest nearby. Some spectators brandish their hats and others their penn bazh to encourage the wrestlers.

The 19th century saw municipal authorities organize numerous "tournaments", often at the time of the National Day, to show that a new authority was now in place, but also within the framework of official parish festivals under the control of the municipalities. However, the population of rural parishes also continued to organize "local struggles", in an almost ritualistic manner, at the time of chapel pardons. Gouren was then the only "sport" in the countryside and seen as an element of social and identity recognition for their parishes of origin.

"On the departmental road to Rosporden, raising a flood of dust, a fairly large number of peasants go to the party. (...) In the village, an even denser crowd blocks the road which forms the main street. (...) However, the dancing has already started in the middle of the street, disturbed at every moment by the stampede of arrivals. Two innkeepers have, in front of their stalls where the cider flows freely, each installed on a minstrels' platform. There are two on each platform, one playing the Binioù, the other the bombard. (...). At four o'clock, everyone goes to the large meadow where the bouts are to take place. (...) The jury, made up of veterans of the country, experts in the art of wrestling, and a few main characters, headed by the district deputy, a large local landowner, comes to place themselves alongside the prize that he must distribute. All around the meadow, sitting on wooden benches or standing, the crowd gathered in order. (...) The fights begin, they are flat-handed bouts, with permission to practice tripping, and the competitors do not hold back. Most of them are very young people, from eighteen to twenty years old, even children of fifteen years old. They strip off their jackets, their vests, their bridge pants. Dressed in boxers and their shirts, barefoot on the grass, they grope each other, grab each other by the armpits and try to knock each other over by skill or by surprise. The adversaries are often of equal strength, the fight lasts a long time, the shirts are subjected to a severe test, despite the solidity of the large peasant canvas from which they are made. At the moment of the fall, the vanquished, very agile, turns like an eel on its side; the shoulders not having touched the ground, you must then start again. (...).»

=== 20th century ===
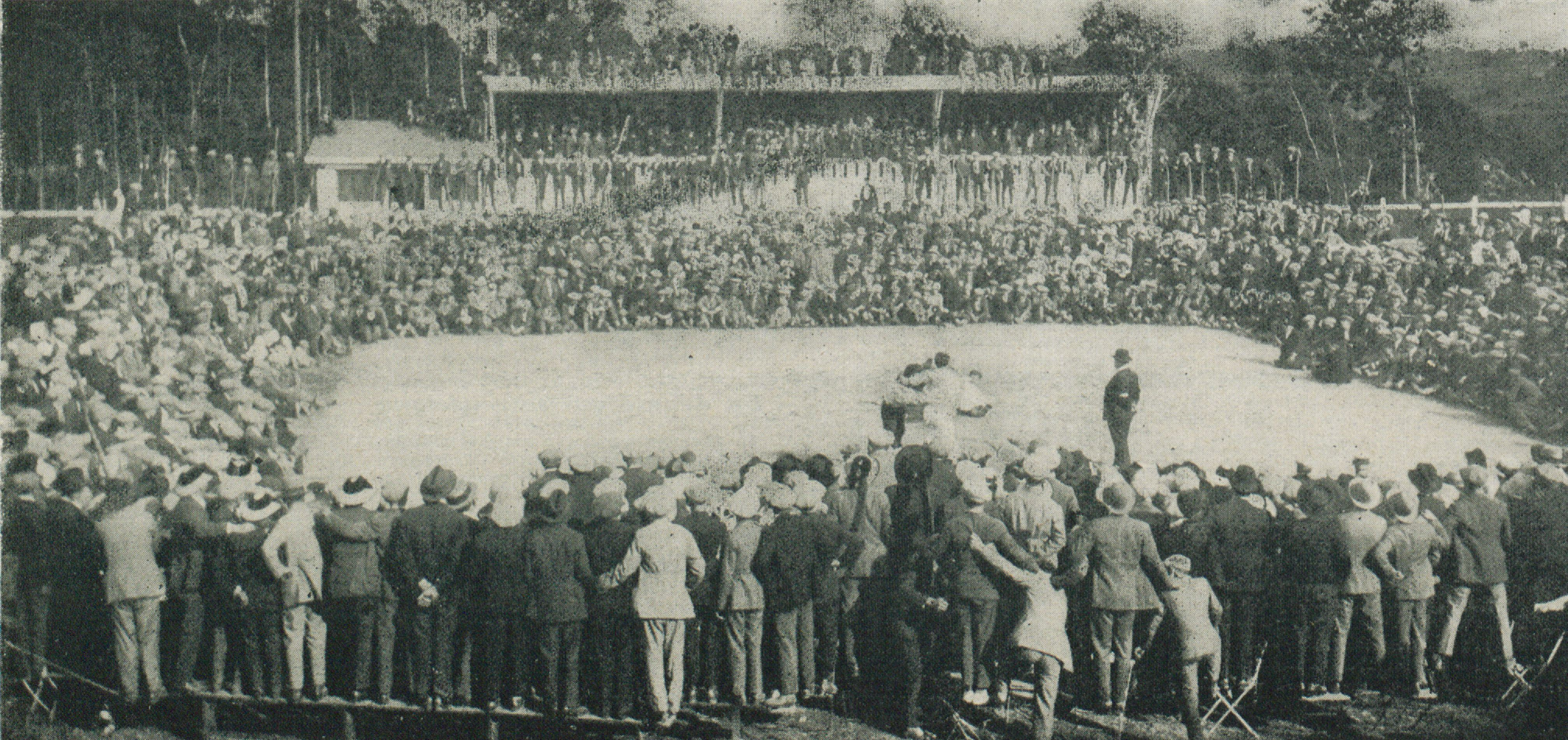
Competition in Quimperlé in 1928, reuniting 6000 spectators.

Gouren was especially popular in Brittany towards the beginning of the 20th century, before the beginning of World War I (1914), with competitions every Sunday during the summer season in numerous small villages.

In 1930, to revitalize the practice of gouren, Charles Cottonec of Quimperlé (Finistère) and his team breathed new life into the sport by codifying it : renovating rules, adding age and weight categories as well as limiting time for bouts. This was done after the creation of the first federation of the sport, the FALSAB (Fédération des Amis des Luttes et Sports Athlétiques Bretons – Federation of Friends of Breton Wrestling and Athletic Sports), of which the current Gouren Federation is largely an extension. He also preceded each tournament with an oath, also called "serment de loyauté" (oath of loyalty). This oath is part of the ritual practices linked to the gouren, such as the hug and the dornad (handshake), which form the accord de loyauté (agreement of loyalty).

Today gouren is well-organised. It has its own federation while maintaining a practice linked to regional culture, clubs (skoliou), and its own European Championships which take place every two years.

Many clubs (the skoliou gouren) welcome almost two thousand practitioners, for example in Berrien or in the Pays fouesnantais. An international federation of Celtic wrestling (FILC) was created in 1985, initially bringing together federations from so-called "Celtic" countries (Scotland, Wales, Cornwall, Cumbria), then gradually other federations managing the styles traditional wrestlings of Western Europe. European championships have been organized every year since 1991. A sign of its renewal, the gouren has been part of the optional baccalaureate exams in Brittany since 1998.

Gouren has also kept its cultural ties, and thus, in summer especially, displays of the martial art can be seen during numerous open-air competitions, on sawdust, sometimes with the use of the old challenge system, in parties and festivals, alongside Breton music and dance.

The gouren is also listed in the Inventory of intangible cultural heritage in France.

== The Mod-Kozh tournament ==
The challenge and the start of the bout

The mod-kozh tournament ("in the old fashion") takes place in two weight categories by challenge: a wrestler seizes the trophy and challenges the other competitors by circling around the combat area, anyone being free to take up the challenge by tapping him or her on the shoulder or calling on him with the words chomed o sav! ("stay up !").

To win the tournament trophy one must win 3 fights in a row. With the skoliou system (wrestling schools) the tournament takes a strategic turn because two wrestlers from the same club cannot meet (challenge each other) and so it's necessary to challenge the right wrestler at the right time, without exhausting oneself too much in order to be able to win 3 fights in a row.

The winner wins the maout (ram) and triumphs during a lap of honor carrying the animal on his shoulders. The gourener Mathieu Le Dour (Skol Ar Faoued) marked his era by winning numerous tournaments by challenge, known as "mod kozh" (old fashion).

== Outfit ==
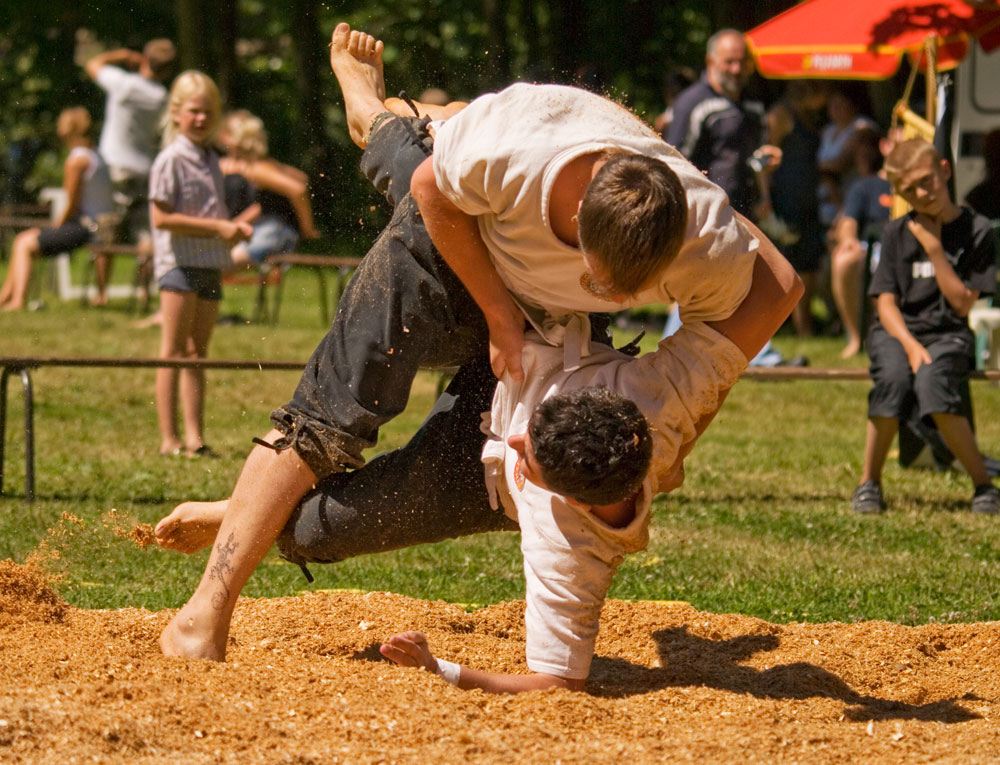
Two wrestlers during an outdoor competition in Guingamp.

The wrestler is required to fight barefoot. His outfit consists of:

- mid-length black pants (bragoù or bragù) whose legs stop just below the knee to allow the lower leg move called kliked;
- a special white combat shirt (roched) with short sleeves;
- a belt keeps the roched close to the body.

No advertising inscription is tolerated on the outfit, apart from the federal badge with different colors depending on the Rannig (technical level).

== Competitions ==
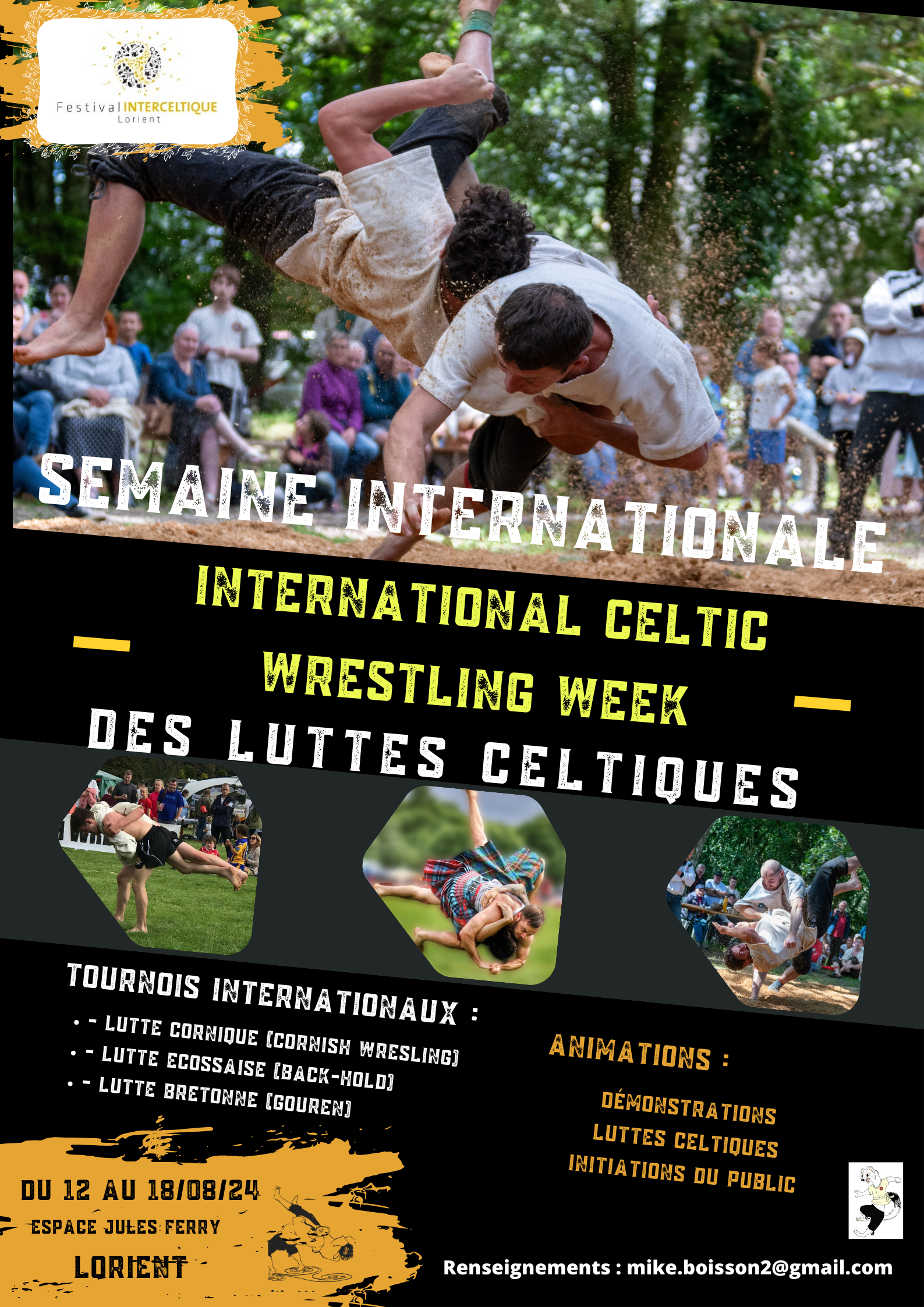
Advert for the Celtic wrestling competitions at the Lorient festival 2024

=== Rules ===
The two adversaries face each other.

The wrestlers try to throw each other to the ground by grappling the other's roched.

The Gouren bouts are arbitrated by 3 referees with equal rights. Decisions are made by majority.

The possible results following a fall are (in decreasing order):

- The Lamm (fall in breton language) : The perfect result is the lamm. It ends the bout and afford victory immediately. The goal is to throw the opponent to obtain a backfall with both shoulders blades touching the ground at the same time, before any other part of the body and before any part of the opponent's.
- The Kostin : the next best result, very close to the lamm. It can be a fall on one shoulder, for example. It is counted at the end of a bout. It is worth 4 points.
- The Kein (back) : an advantage, it's taken into account at the end of an astenn (extra time: half the time of a bout). It is a fall of the inferior part of the back, or the whole back and posterior.
- The Netra (nothing) : a fall that doesn't product any result.

Faults count as well for the final result. A fault can be an unjustified aggressive behavior (verbal or physical), an attitude dangerous to the opponent or a refusal to fight by remaining in a defensive position for an exaggerated duration. During a throw, the wrestler who first throws his arm to the ground to avoid the result is considered to have refused to fight.

- Diwall (attention) : it is a warning given for a fault, before sanctioning the wrestler with a fazi. It has no impact on the outcome of the fight;
- Fazi (fault) : it is the result of a fault committed by the wrestler. 3 fazis lead to a Fazi Vraz;
- Poent (point) : it is obtained when the opponent has accumulated 2 fazis. He is equivalent to a Kostin, except in the case of perfect equality between the two wrestlers where he is superior;
- Fazi Vraz (big fault) : it is a disqualification for the fight, given for the accumulation of 3 fazis;
- Divrud (discredit) : it is a disqualification from the competition, given for a serious fault (insult, disrespectful behavior).

=== Categories ===
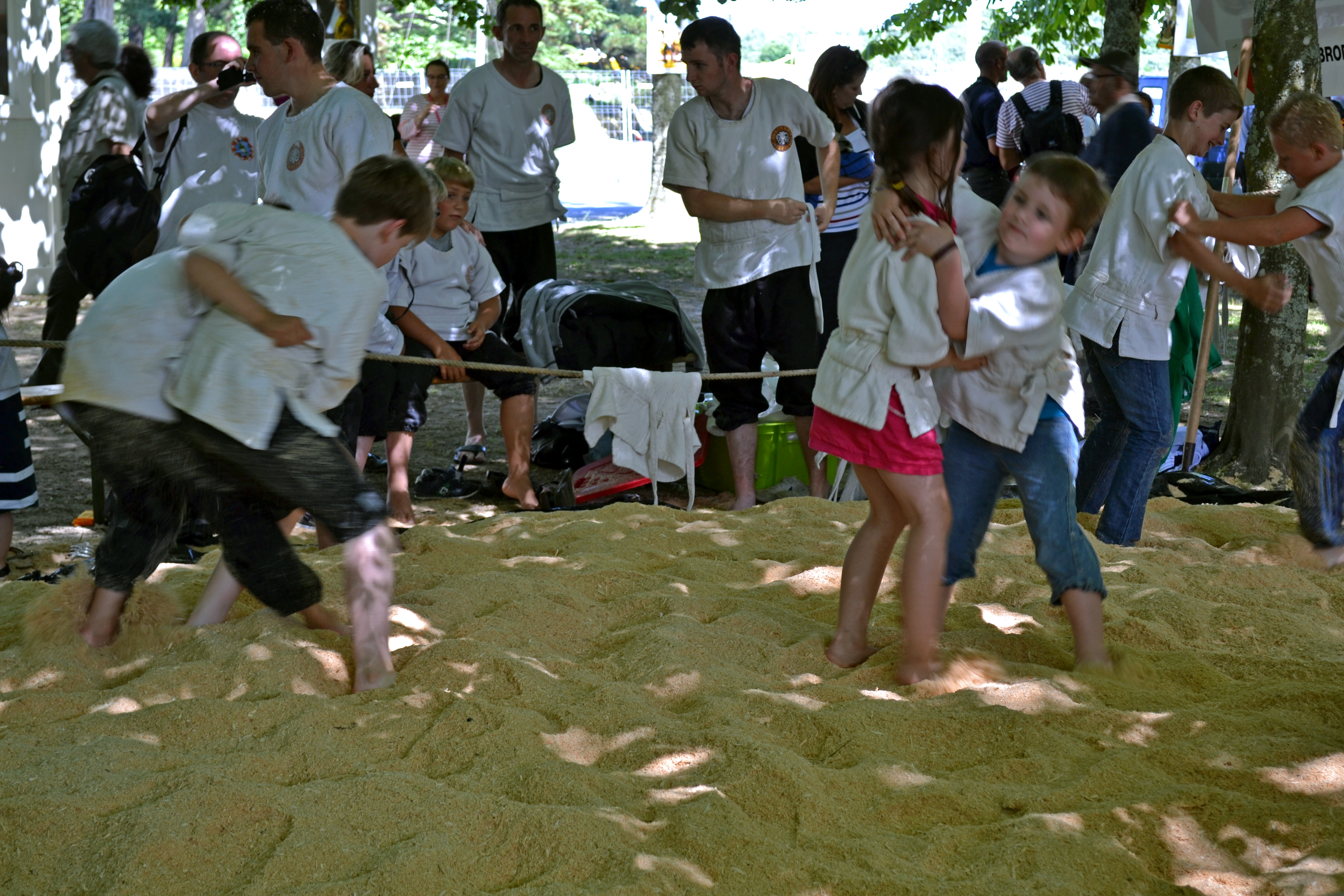
Young children, poucets and poussins, practicing gouren at the Fête des Brodeuses 2014.

Men
	Featherweight	Lightweight	Middleweight	Light Heavyweight	Heavyweight	Super Heavyweight	
Senior (21 years-old and +)	−62 kg	−68 kg	−74 kg	−81 kg	−90 kg	+90 kg	
Junior (18, 19, 20 years-old)	−57 kg	−62 kg	−68 kg	−74 kg	−81 kg	+81 kg	
Cadet (16,17 years-old)	−48 kg	−54 kg	−60 kg	−66 kg	−74 kg	+74 kg	
Minime (14,15 years-old)	−40 kg	−45 kg	−50 kg	−56 kg	−62 kg	−68 kg	+68 kg
Benjamin (12,13 years-old)	−33 kg	−37 kg	−41 kg	−46 kg	−52 kg	+52 kg	
Poussin (9,10,11 years-old)	−25 kg	−28 kg	−32 kg	−36 kg	−41 kg	+41 kg	
Poucet (7,8 years-old)

Women
	Featherweight	Lightweight	Middleweight	Light Heavyweight	Heavyweight	Super Heavyweight	
Senior (21 years-old and +)	-52 kg	-57 kg	-63 kg	-70 kg	+70 kg		
Junior (18,19,20 years-old)	-52 kg	-57 kg	-63 kg	-70 kg	+70 kg		
Cadet (16,17 years-old)	-52 kg	-57 kg	-63 kg	-70 kg	+70 kg		
Minime (14,15 years-old)	-35 kg	-40 kg	-45 kg	-50 kg	-56 kg	-62 kg	+62
Benjamin (12,13 years-old)	-35 kg	-40 kg	-45 kg	-50 kg	-56 kg	-62 kg	+62
Poussin (9,10,11 years-old)	−25 kg	−28 kg	−32 kg	−36 kg	−41 kg	+41 kg	
Poucet (7,8 years-old)

=== Duration ===
The duration of a bout depends on the age category and the type of competition.

- The youngest children or benjamins : 3 minutes;
- The minimes : 4 minutes;
- Cadets, juniors and seniors (challenges) : 5 minutes;
- Juniors in the championship : 6 minutes;
- Seniors in the championship : 7 minutes;
- The female benjamins and minimes wrestle for 3 minutes, the female cadets, juniors and seniors 4 minutes.

Overtime is possible if no result allowing the fight to be won is obtained at the end of regulation time; the overtime is equal to half the normal combat time.

== European Celtic Wrestling Championship ==
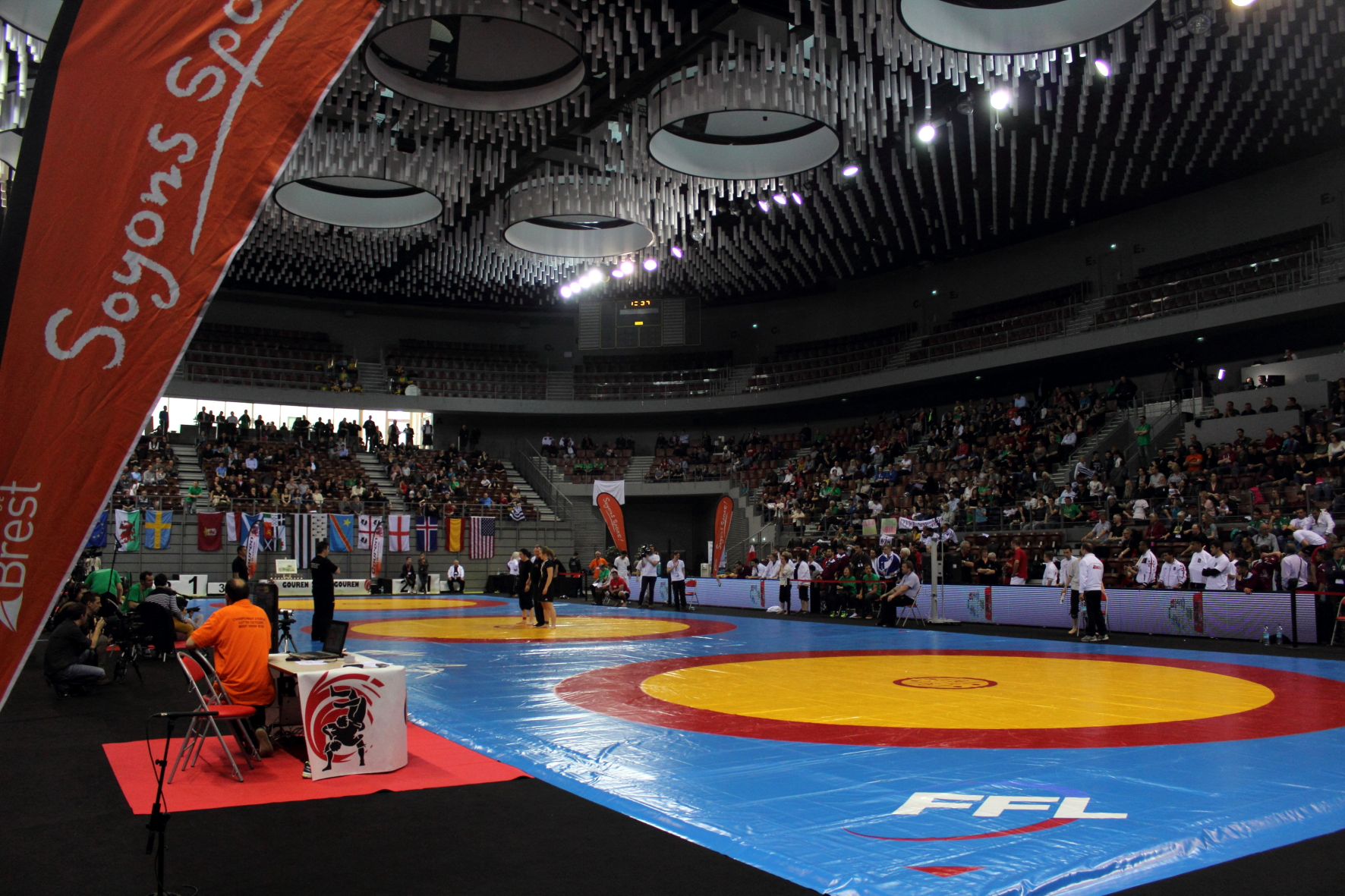
The 2016 championships take place in the hall Brest Arena, France.

Gouren is not confined to the regional level: it is also practiced at the international level. The Gouren Federation is part of the FILC (International Federation of Celtic Wrestling), a federation created in 1985 in Cardiff, Wales, symbolically in the premises of the association for the promotion of the Welsh language "Urdd Gobaith Cymru". In addition to Brittany, 11 other countries or regions are part of the FILC: Austria (Salzburg), Scotland, Cumbria (England), Ireland, Iceland, Spanish León, Spanish Cantabria, the Canary Islands, Sweden, the Netherlands and Sardinia. All these nations have a traditional wrestling. The main aim of the FILC is not to organize international championships, but to help its member federations develop their styles, and to encourage sporting and friendly exchanges between European wrestlers.

The European Celtic Wrestling Championships are organized every year or every two years. The team victory is the most valued. Those traditional sports are practiced at a high level: some delegations even include professional wrestlers. They are grouped together within the International Celtic Wrestling Federation. The city of Brest (Brittany) organized the FILC 30th anniversary championship in 2016 (wrestling: gouren and back-hold).

In 2017, the senior European championships took place in Austria while in 2019, Iceland took care of the organization of the international competition.

In 2018, the European Championships were hosted in Penrith, England, and took place in Guipavas in April 2020.

== See also ==
- Collar-and-elbow
- Cornish wrestling
- Cumberland and Westmorland wrestling
- Greco-Roman wrestling
- Scottish backhold
- Glíma
