= Glíma =

Nordic folk wrestling

Glima
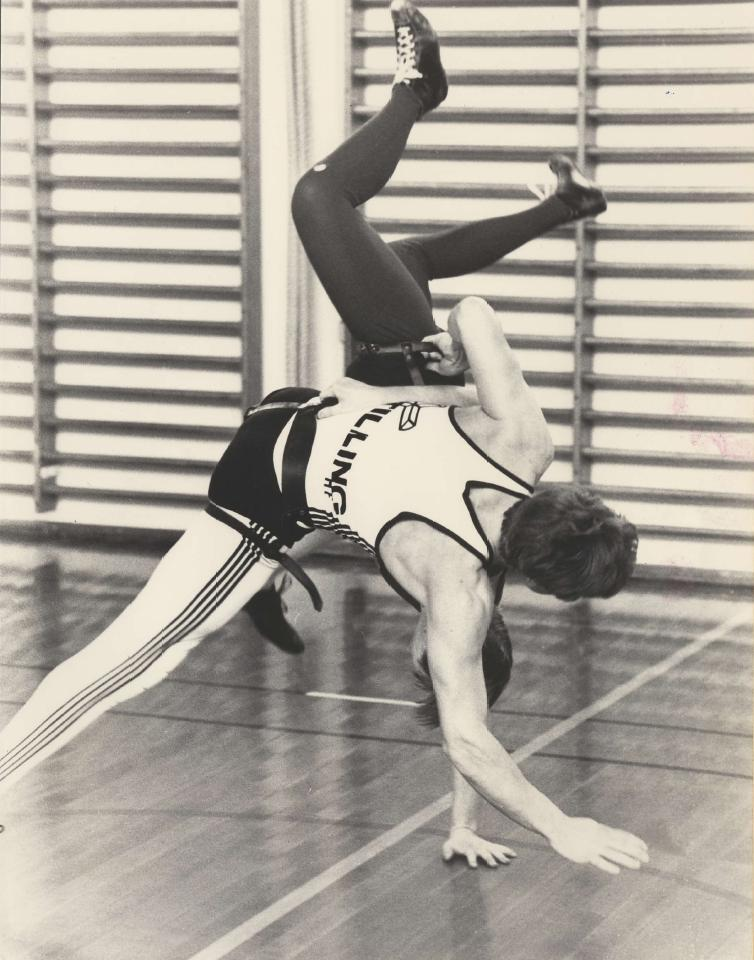
- Glima wrestling
- Focus: Grappling
- Hardness: Full-contact
- Country of origin: Iceland

Glíma (anglicised as Glima / Icelandic Wrestling) is an Icelandic sport for combat and is categorised as Nordic folk wrestling. In the most common form of glima, players grip their opponent by the waist and attempt to throw them to the ground using technique rather than force. Other variants allow for more aggression.

== History ==
The original settlers in Iceland took wrestling with them, and these combat systems have been used by the populace according to the Jónsbók law book from 1325. A modern trouser-grip glima competition was first held in Iceland in 1888 and has been held almost every year since. In 1905 the belt was introduced so that the wrestlers could have a better grip on each other. Before that they held on to each other's trousers. In 1906 the first competition for the Belt of Grettir was held where the winners are named The Glima King. In the 1912 Summer Olympics there was a demonstration of modern trouser-grip glima.

== Variants ==
=== Trouser-grip wrestling ===
The trouser-grip (brókartök) version is by far the most widespread in Iceland and is Iceland's national sport. It favours technique over strength. The wrestlers wear a special belt around the waist and additional belts on the lower thighs of each leg, which connect to the main belt. A fixed grip is then taken with one hand in the belt and the other in the trousers at thigh height. From this position the glima-wrestler attempts to trip and throw his opponent. In this style of glima, a thrown wrestler may attempt to land on his feet and hands and if he succeeds in doing so he has not lost the fall. The winning condition in this type of glima is to make the opponent touch the ground with an area of the body between the elbow and the knee.

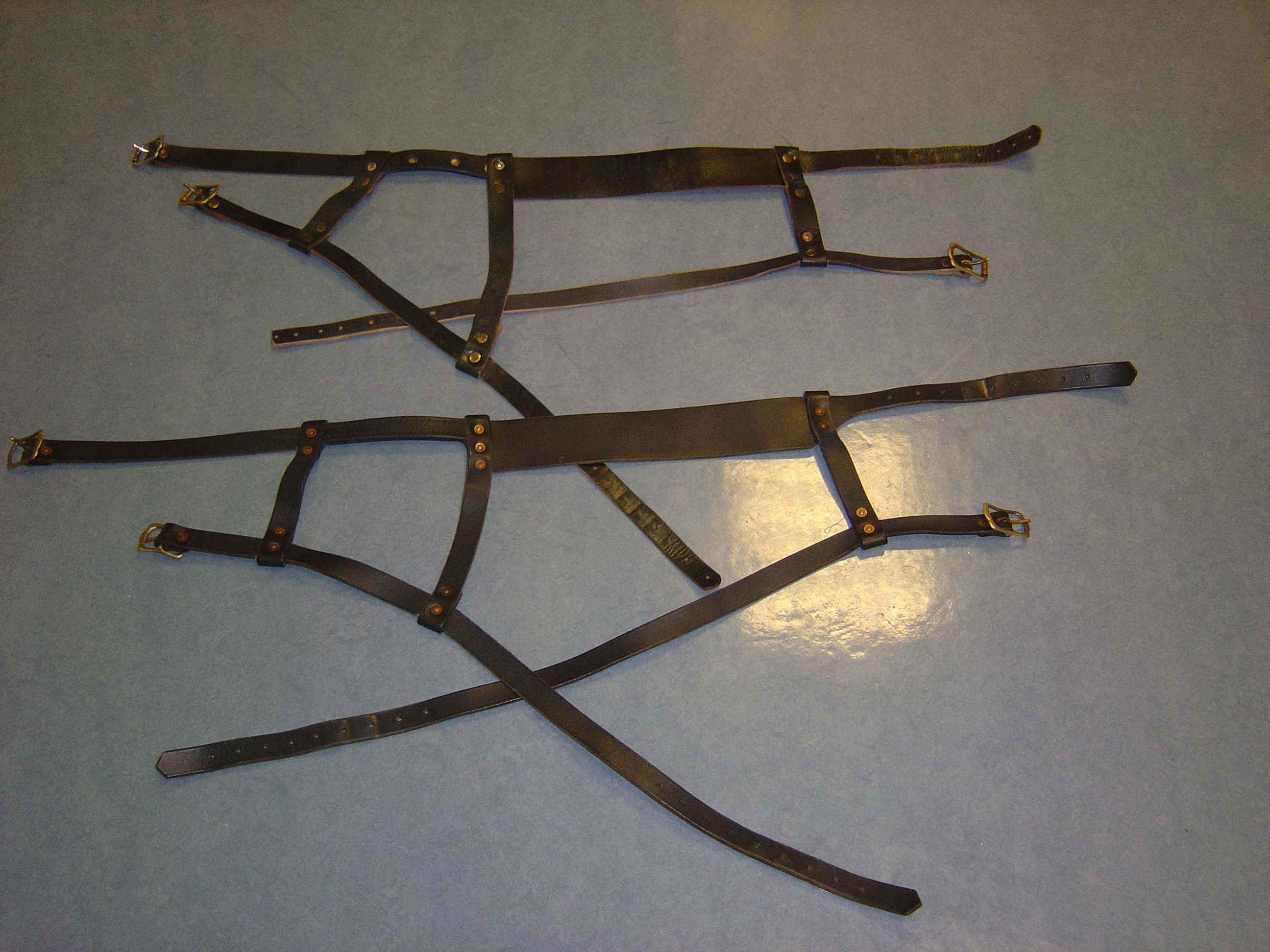
Two glima belts

There are four points that differentiate it from other forms of wrestling:

- The opponents must always stand erect.
- The opponents step clockwise around each other (looks similar to a waltz). This is to create opportunities for offence and defence, and to prevent a stalemate.
- It is not permitted to fall down on your opponent or to push him down in a forceful manner, as it is not considered sportsman-like.
- The opponents are supposed to look across each other's shoulders as much as possible because it is considered proper to wrestle by touch and feel rather than sight.

The core of the system are eight main techniques, which form the basic training for approximately 50 ways to execute a throw or takedown.

Surrounding glima is a code of honour called drengskapur that calls for fairness, respect for and caring about the security of one's training partners.

The word glíma is the Icelandic term for "wrestling" in general. The same word has also a wider meaning of "struggle".

Glima differs from other ethnic wrestling styles in three ways:

- Upright position – The contestants must remain upright. The body position in many other ethnic wrestling styles is often bent over at the waist, but in glima this is called ousting and is banned.
- Stepping – Glima involves the contestants constantly stepping back and forth in a clockwise direction. This stepping—"stígandi"—is one of the characteristics of glima and is designed to avoid a standstill and create opportunities for offence and attack.
- A ban on knocking over – It is forbidden to push your opponent down with force. This is considered to be unsportsmanlike and in opposition to the nature of glima as a sport for honorable sportsmen and women. Opponents should be conquered by using a well implemented grip that makes the opponent fall gracefully to the ground without any further action.

=== Backhold wrestling ===
Backhold wrestling (hryggspenna) is more similar to other styles of wrestling and is considered to be more a test of strength than of technique. In backhold wrestling the opponents take hold of each other's upper body; whoever touches the ground with any part of the body except the feet has lost.

=== Loose-grip wrestling ===
In loose-grip wrestling (lausatök) the contestants may use any holds they wish.

It is much more aggressive and differs in many ways from other styles of glima. Loose-grip wrestling comes in two forms: A version for self-defence and a version for friendly competition. In both, all kinds of wrestling techniques are allowed, but in the friendly version they are still taught to be executed in a way so they won't cause the opponent injury. In such a friendly match, the winner is considered the one who is still standing while the other is lying on the ground. This means that if both the opponents fall to the ground together, the match will continue on the ground by the use of techniques to keep the other down while getting up yourself.

Even more divergent from other forms of glima is loose-grip glima when trained purely for self-defence. In such training the harmful and hurtful techniques or ways of executing the techniques, that are not accepted in other forms of glima, are explored in as free and creative a way as possible while not injuring one's training partners.

This form of glima is practised at the Norwegian Glima Championship and Lausatök Combat Glima Finland.

== See also ==
- Belt wrestling
- Collar-and-elbow
- Cornish wrestling
- Cumberland and Westmorland wrestling
- Folk wrestling
- Gouren
- Khuresh
- Mongolian wrestling
- Schwingen
- Shuai jiao
