= Collar-and-elbow =

Style of folk wrestling native to Ireland

Brollaidheacht (Collar-and-elbow)
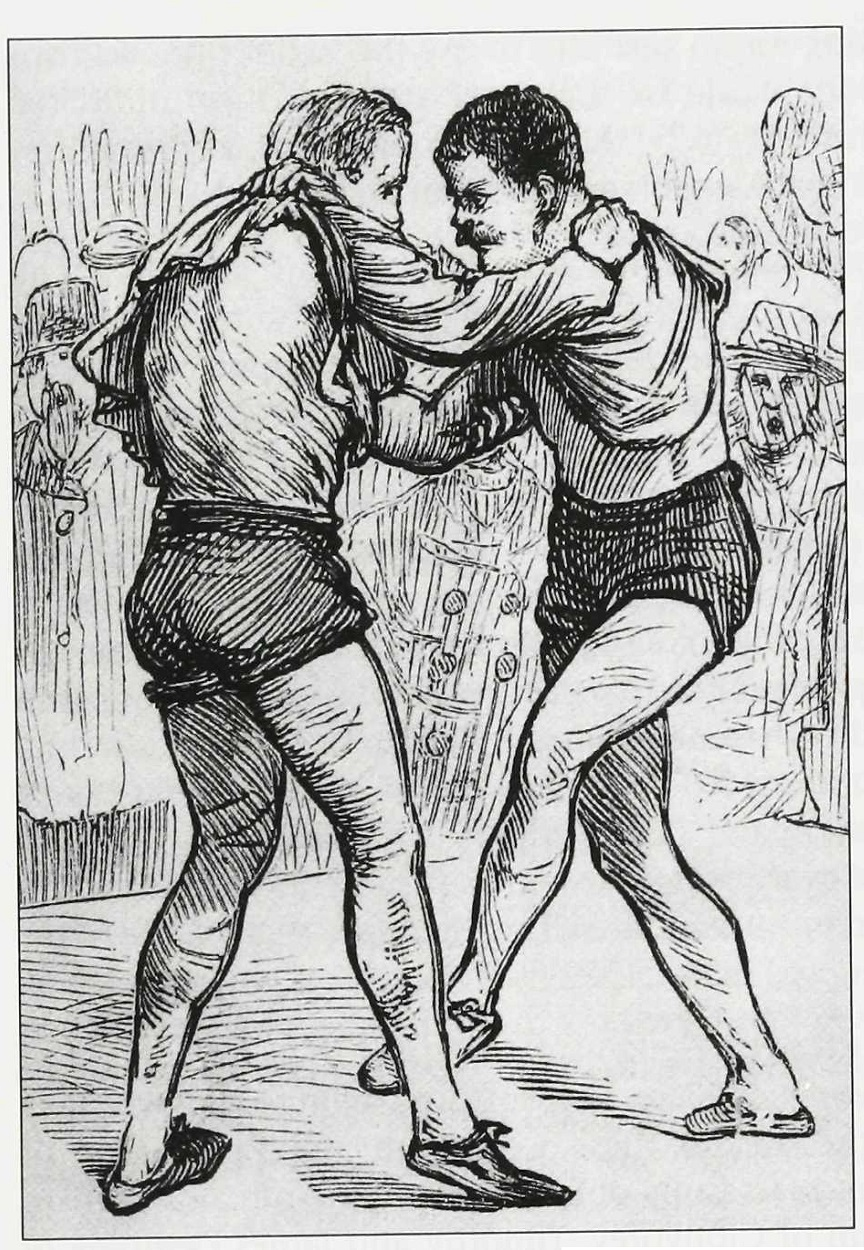
- Also known as: Coiléar agus Uille, Scuffling, Irish-Style Scuffling, Tripping, Square-Hold Wrestling
- Focus: Grappling
- Country of origin: Ireland
- Creator: Various
- Famous practitioners: John McMahon, Henry Moses Dufur, James H. McLaughlin, Homer Lane,
- Related arts: Cornish wrestling, Gouren
- Olympic sport: No

Irish Collar-and-elbow wrestling (Irish: Coiléar agus Uille or Brollaidheacht) is a martial art and form of jacket wrestling native to Ireland. Historically it has also been practised in regions of the world with large Irish diaspora populations, such as the United States and Australia.

The term ‘Elbow-Collar’ or ‘Elbow-and-Collar’ Wrestling was not exclusively used as a name for Irish Wrestling. The term was also known in Britain, where it was practiced in at least two other places: ‘Devonshire Wrestling’, and ‘Norfolk Wrestling’. Collectively, they are known as the British Outplay styles of Wrestling, which were defined by standing outside of range and used kicking and tripping.

== History ==
=== Origins in Ireland ===
Wrestling as a competitive sport has been recorded in Ireland as far back as the second millennium BC, when it featured as one of the many athletic contests held during the annual Tailteann Games. The mythical hero Cúchulainn boasted of his prowess in both hurling and wrestling, and was on one occasion enraged by an undead spectre mockingly suggesting that his skill in the latter area had been highly exaggerated. Carved depictions of two figures in a recognisable wrestling clinch appear on the Market High Cross of Kells and the ruins of a church at Kilteel (both 9th century AD), and wrestling matches were common features of country fairs until at least the 18th century.

These wrestling contests were occasionally violent affairs. Participants could be and were frequently injured, sometimes fatally so, as in the case of a contest between one Thomas Costello (known locally as "Tumaus Loidher" – Thomas the Strong) and an unnamed champion in which Costello ostensibly squeezed on his opponent's harness so powerfully that it broke the man's spine. There appear to have been little or no attempts to moderate these violent aspects of wrestling from a legal point of view; as historian Edward MacLysaght noted in his account of the match, as the participant in a sporting contest Costello had little to fear in terms of official retribution.

These accounts of early Irish wrestling matches all describe participants taking a diverse range of grips on their opponents – from clutching at any available limb in the time of Cúchulainn, to a backhold-style clinch on the carvings at Kells and Kilteel, to both hands holding a belt in the match between Thomas Costello and his ill-fated opponent. However, by the 18th century a new form of grip had established itself as the favoured hold: right hand grabbing the opponent's collar, left hand grabbing the sleeve of their jacket at the elbow. This position, and all its associated techniques and strategies, was to quickly emerge as the dominant framework under which Irish wrestling matches were contested.

=== Brollaidheacht in Ireland ===
In the 19th century, Brollaidheacht was one of the most widely practised sporting activities in the country – "the chief physical sport of the male population from childhood to mature manhood". Bouts took place between local champions and challengers on a parish level, and those between the most well-known and skilled wrestlers could draw thousands of spectators from across neighbouring counties. Although it was primarily referred to by its English name, Collar and Elbow is known to have had at least two names in Irish: "Coiléar agus Uille" (a literal translation of Collar and Elbow) and "brollaidheacht". The latter derives from the term for the front of a shirt ("brollach léine") and thus "brollaidheacht" could be translated as "collaring" – a reference to the grip that wrestlers were required to take on each other's jackets.

Victory was determined by a "fall", the definition of which differed from county to county. In Kildare a wrestler was deemed to have won if he made his opponent touch the ground with any single part of his body above the knees, whereas in Dublin he was required to make three points of his opponent's body touch the ground (usually both shoulders and a hip, or both hips and a shoulder). A significant difference between Collar and Elbow as it was practised in Ireland and the United States is that, in its Irish incarnation, shin-kicking was routinely permitted. This, coupled with the fact that many participants wore heavy work boots, resulted in a level of injury among Irish wrestlers not usually seen among their US counterparts. Shins were frequently "gored and/or bruised" after a match, and on rare occasions outright broken.

Admirers of the style nonetheless lauded its "eminently scientific and picturesque" virtues. In particular, they claimed that, since the opening stance prevented the "bull-like charges, flying tackles, or other onrushes" common in other wrestling styles, Brollaidheacht encouraged participants to develop "deftness, balance, and leverage allied with strength, [which permitted] a man to win by means of skill instead of sheer might and weight".

=== Brollaidheacht in the United States ===
As levels of Irish emigration to the United States steadily increased throughout the 17th–19th centuries, so too did the presence of the Irish cultural traditions they brought with them – including their wrestling style. New England in general, and Vermont in particular, emerged as an early stronghold of Collar and Elbow after it had been introduced by immigrants largely from County Kildare. During the US Civil War, Vermont regiments introduced the style to other units in the Army of the Potomac, and in that way it acquired immense popularity among men from other regions of the United States who might otherwise never have encountered it. By the time the Civil War ended, Collar and Elbow had emerged as one of the most common rulesets under which wrestling bouts were contested nationwide.

Bouts drew large and enthusiastic crowds across the country, and purses of several hundred dollars were routinely offered for championship contests. Vermont continued to remain a significant force in the Collar and Elbow world throughout, with two of the style's most notable 19th-century practitioners, Henry Moses Dufur and John McMahon, hailing from Franklin County. Practitioners of Collar and Elbow in general were colloquially referred to as "scufflers" (occasionally "trippers" in reference to the leg-centric strategies they employed), and a Collar and Elbow bout itself as "scuffling" or a "scuffling bee".

== Rules ==
Initially, Collar and Elbow bouts in both Ireland and the United States were governed by unwritten, often improvised codes of conduct rather than any kind of codified rules. Irish historian Edward MacLysaght recorded as early as the 1600s that rules for Collar and Elbow in Ireland varied widely by region and often were finalized shortly before two Scufflers would wrestle. An early attempt to standardise the competitive rules of the style was made in advance of a tournament that was scheduled to be held in St. Albans, Vermont in 1856. The tournament was ultimately cancelled due to "an epidemic of disease" in the region, however, and no record of the proposed ruleset exists. It was almost two decades later before the first widely accepted set of rules was published in America. These were compiled by American Collar and Elbow champion Henry Moses Dufur, and as such came to be colloquially known as the Dufur Rules. Among other things, they stated that wrestlers had to compete while wearing a suitably sturdy jacket, and banned the wearing of heavy footwear.

A book by Charles Wilson, The Magnificent Scufflers, cited Collar and Elbower Ed Decker (who learned and trained with Irish-American and world collar and elbow champion John McMahon), as stating that the grip was broken to execute technique, as well as incorporating from Side-Hold Wrestling techniques. It furthers elaborated that it was at times called "Square Hold", "Box Wrestling", "Old Folk Style" (in some regions of America) or "New Gouren". The book further cited Art Griffith, assistant coach to Ed C. Gallagher, in stating that Collar and Elbow was influential to Gallagher developing his own method style of wrestling more focused on unbalancing rather than explosive power or speed.

The Dufur rules were closely followed by the Ed James rules in America, published as part of a general manual of sporting rules and regulations in 1873. These were largely the same as the Dufur rules, and specified the clear conditions for victory – a wrestler had to throw his opponent flat on his back, similar to the concept of ippon in judo. The Ed James rules were to act as the agreed-upon standard for the majority of Collar and Elbow bouts held in the United States during its 19th-century heyday:

- The men shall wear knit shirt and short coat or jacket, not extending below the hips, with strong collar and elbow for grasp of the opponent, and thin rubber sandals on the feet.
- Each man shall take hold of the collar of his opponent with his right hand, while with his left he must take hold of the elbow.
- Both men shall stand up breast to breast, with limber arms, and show fair play.

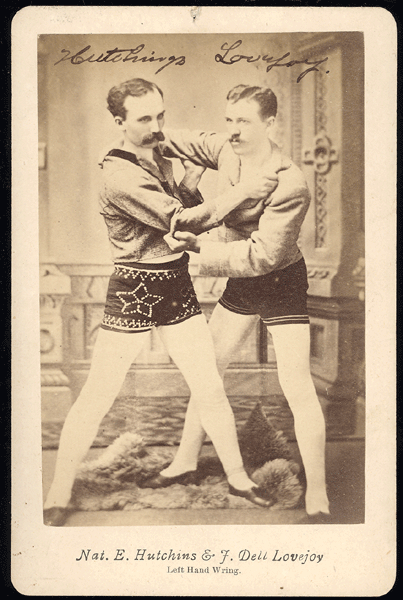
Two wrestlers in the 1880s demonstrating the Collar and Elbow grips

Even in so-called "mixed wrestling" bouts where men would compete against each other in consecutive rounds under different rulesets (e.g. Catch-as-Catch-Can, Greco-Roman, and Collar and Elbow), they would specifically be required to don jackets for the Collar and Elbow rounds.

=== Jackets and Harness ===
Although there are accounts of bouts being held in which the combatants were shirtless – particularly in rural areas during the summer months – in its standardised competitive form Brollaidheacht required both participants to wear jackets or heavy shirts that could be gripped and used to set up throwing techniques. A similar requirement exists in other Celtic styles like Cornish wrestling and Breton Gouren. At wrestling events in Dublin, a common method of issuing a challenge was to place a jacket in the centre of the ring and wait for a contender to step in and put it on.

In Ireland – and in the early days in the United States – there were no standardised requirements for the durability or the length of the jacket. This occasionally led to disputes between prospective opponents when one party believed that the other's attire provided him with an unfair advantage, such as the one that occurred between Patrick Cullen and Paddy Dunne in which Dunne alleged that Cullen's long cavalry officer's coat would prevent him from seeing and defending against his leg techniques. Contests were occasionally even called off mid-bout when a jacket ripped or was otherwise unable to bear the rigours of a prolonged wrestling match. The Dufur rules of the 19th century were the first to specifically state that any jacket used for a Collar and Elbow bout had to be "tight-fitting, with strongly sewn seams". This prescription was mirrored in the Ed James rules, which also elaborated that the jacket should not reach below the wrestler's hips so that their leg attacks would be freely visible.

Subsequently, a dedicated leather harness was developed to act as a potential substitute for the jacket. The invention of the harness is attributed to Homer Lane, a three-time national Collar and Elbow champion of the United States. It saw somewhat frequent use in both the US and Canada, but in general the majority of Brollaidheacht bouts continued to be held using the requisite durable jackets.

== Techniques ==
Since both combatants' hands were fixed in place on each other's jackets in the United States, American Collar and Elbow came to be distinguished by its volume and variety of leg techniques. Scufflers would circle each other throwing rapid-fire combinations of trips, taps, kicks, and sweeps in an attempt to off-balance their opponent and send him crashing to the ground – an extended exchange of attack and defense that one historian described as "footsparring". Observers of Collar and Elbow bouts in parts of America that used the Dufur or Ed James rules frequently remarked upon this aspect of the style, with one journalist in Minnesota proposing that a Collar and Elbow match between two skilled participants was really "a fist fight with the feet".(This was stated only in a single reference in Minnesota; No such description was ever used for Irish Collar and Elbow in Ireland)

Although wrestlers' grips were fixed in place in the American rulesets, they were nonetheless free to push, pull, and twist their opponent using their arms, and ultimately any form of takedown was permitted as long as the person executing it maintained his collar-and-elbow grips while doing so. One of the more dramatic takedowns was the flying mare – described as an explosive, high-impact throw that would send the victim's feet flying up over his head. In catch wrestling and Greco-Roman wrestling this is usually depicted as something akin to ippon seoi nage.

In the Magnificent Scufflers, a list of techniques borrowed from catch-wrestling and native to Collar and Elbow was given, as well as the author observing that at a recent wrestling meet with Ed Gallagher's team that aside from the namesake grip, the techniques used by Gallagher's team was Collar and Elbow throughout. In 1925, Ed C. Gallagher published a book, Amateur Wrestling, which includes techniques for both amateur catch as catch can and AAU wrestling bouts that described and showed pictures of neck grips and arm shoves for unbalancing techniques and pins that demonstrated both legs (or hips) and one shoulder or both shoulders and one leg to pin opponents. This matches the descriptions in Charles Wilson of unbalancing techniques from collar and elbow and "3 or 4 point pins" for victory in some rulesets.

The following techniques were listed in a 1900 dictionary of sporting terms published by the Irish Department of Education (An Roinn Oideachais).

- Caitheamh thar gualainn, flying mare
- Cor ailt, cor mughdhoirn (múrnáin), ankle throw (similar to Sasae tsurikomi ashi)
- Cor coise, tripping throw
- Cor cromáin, hip throw
- Cor glúine, knee throw
- Cor ioscaide, back-knee trip (similar to Osoto otoshi or Osoto gari)
- Cor sála, back-heel (similar to Kosoto gake)
- Cros-chor ailt (múrnáin), cross-ankle trip (similar to Tai otoshi)
- Cros-más, cross-buttock throw (similar to Harai goshi)
- Glac-coise, leg-lock
- Glas coise, hank (similar to Ōuchi gari)
- Lúbaim, hook
- Más, buttock throw (similar to Tsurikomi goshi)
- Snaidim, click (similar to Kosoto gari)
- Tuisleadh, trip

== Decline ==
By the early 20th century, Brollaidheacht had all but disappeared from Ireland. Writing in the Leinster Leader newspaper in 1907, local historian John Ennis directly attributed this to two significant factors – the Great Famine that resulted in the deaths of over 1 million people and the "unnatural exodus" of 1 million more seeking a better way of life, and the colonial-era Coercion Acts that limited any kind of gatherings in public spaces. The demographic and cultural devastation of the former coupled with the oppressive restrictions of the latter resulted in an environment in which Ireland's native wrestling style simply could not be practised, ultimately leading to it fading from everyday life entirely.

An additional significant factor was the lack of any independent, centralised sporting organisation to promote the style. A book published in 1908 by An Chomhairle Náisiúnta (The National Council), referring to both wrestling and handball, noted that "although both these pastimes have been on the Gaelic programme since its first appearance, neither has ever received any official encouragement. Yet both are games in which Gaels have excelled[…] That such a wide area and so popular and meritorious a branch of athletics should have received only nominal recognition is only another instance of how partial and halting has been the management of Gaelic athletic affairs." Individual efforts were made to promote Collar and Elbow bouts in Dublin in 1906, but these were "spontaneous and isolated", and the sport was entirely omitted from the largest government-organised athletics event of the period – the short-lived modern revival of the Tailteann Games held after the Irish Civil War. No records exist of any Brollaidheacht bouts being held in Ireland after the early 20th century.

In the United States, the growing popularity of other grappling styles like catch wrestling and Greco-Roman resulted in Collar and Elbow being practised less and less. The final contest for the Collar and Elbow championship of America – held between James H. McLoughlin and John McMahon – took place in 1878, with McMahon winning with two falls out of three. By 1890, Collar and Elbow was already being referred to as an "old time" sport, and by the early 20th century newspaper accounts of wrestling matches were referring to "the ancient days when collar-and-elbow was the rule".

=== Purported Legacy in Collegiate Wrestling ===
In his 1959 book Magnificent Scufflers, author Charles Morrow Wilson proposed that, even after Collar and Elbow had vanished as a standalone martial art, it continued to exert an influence on the strategies and techniques used in American collegiate wrestling. He specifically highlighted the "foot and leg plays, beginning with foot trips, the heel blocks, and the forward leg trips and working upwards to hip rolls" as "obvious but not deliberate borrowings from Collar and Elbow", and attributed them to the technical innovations introduced by Oklahoma coach Edward C. Gallagher. It should however be noted that neither of Gallagher's self-penned technique manuals, Amateur Wrestling (1925) and Wrestling (1939), mention Collar and Elbow in any way (apart from a lone reference where the term "collar and elbow" is used to describe a single collar tie).

== Modern revival ==
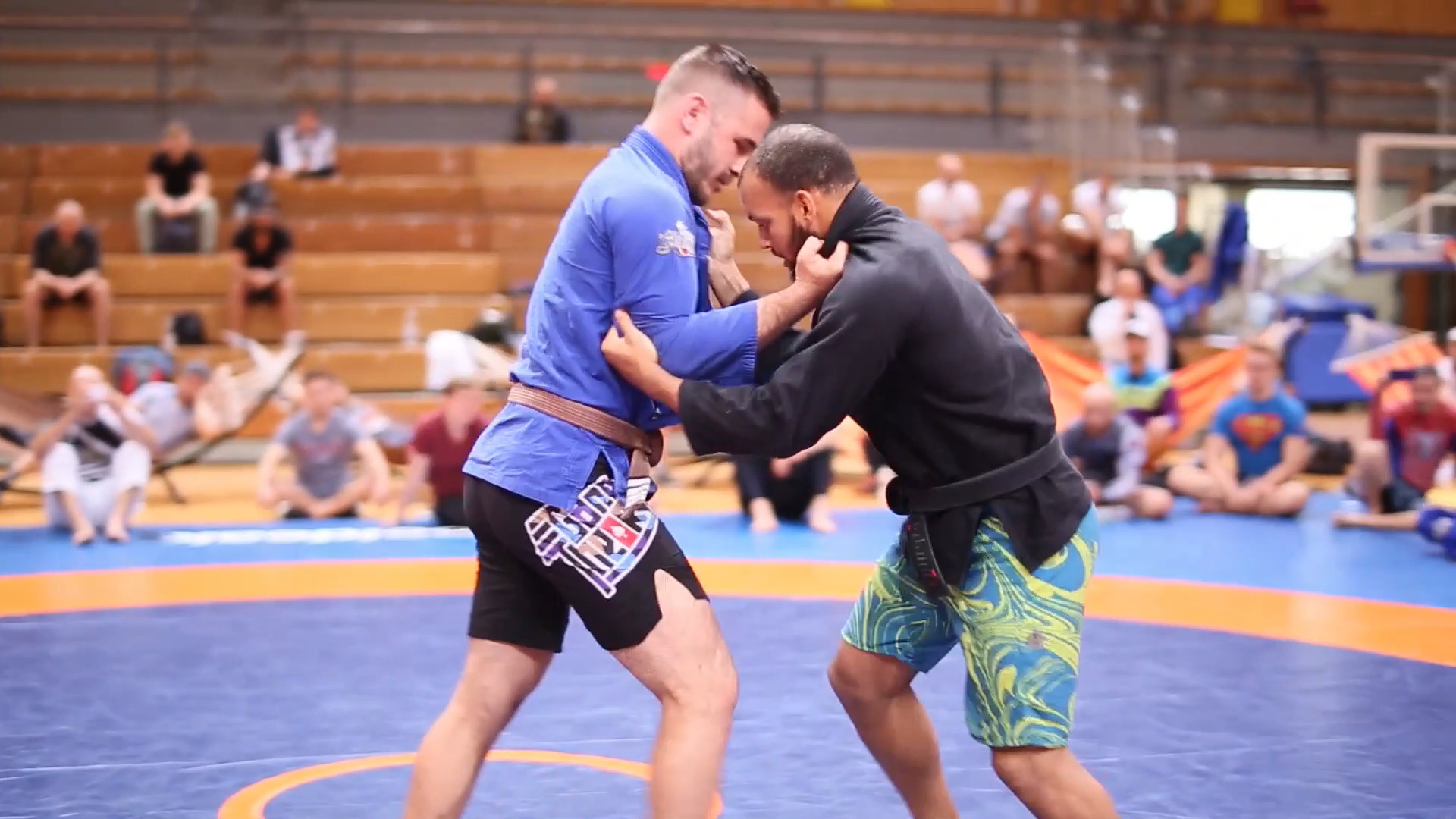
A Brollaidheacht bout between two participants in 2019

In August 2019, a series of Brollaidheacht bouts were held in Heidelberg, Germany. The ruleset for these bouts included several modifications to ensure compatibility with a modern tournament format. Most notably, individual bouts were limited to a maximum of 5 minutes' duration, in contrast to historical Brollaidheacht bouts which were entirely open-ended and routinely lasted several hours.

Subsequently, matches based on the same modern ruleset have been held in the United States, including two competitions in a jacketless variant held by the Boston HEMA League in 2023 and 2024.

Collar and Elbow Wrestling has been established in Chicago, Illinois through the competitive grappling league Wrestling Wars. This promotion features various wrestling styles including catch wrestling and collar & elbow. The leagues founder, Thomas “The Headhunter” Higgins has brought awareness to the sport by sharing videos on social media, holding seminars, teaching classes, and hosting demonstrations at gyms and Irish cultural centers alike since 2022, making Chicago one of the hotspots of the sports modern revival.

== See also ==
- Catch wrestling
- Cumberland and Westmorland wrestling
- Cornish wrestling
- Folk wrestling
- Gouren
- Judo
- Scottish Backhold
- Shin-kicking
