= Koluchstyle =

Swiss folk wrestling

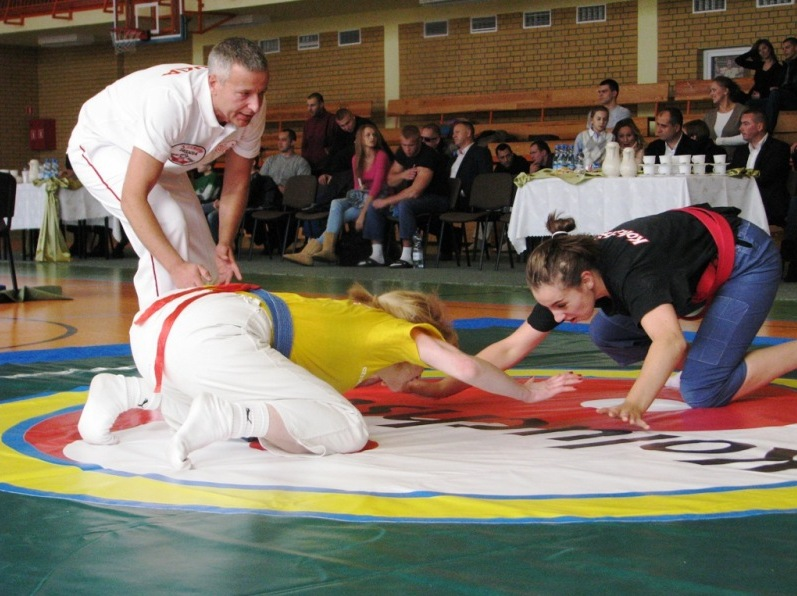
- Focus: Martial Arts
- Country of origin: Poland
- Creator: Wiesław Koluch
- Olympic sport: No

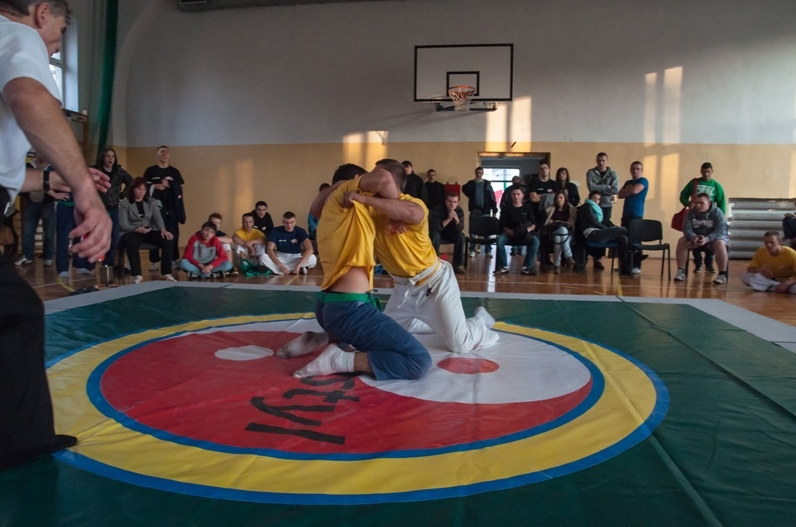
Competition

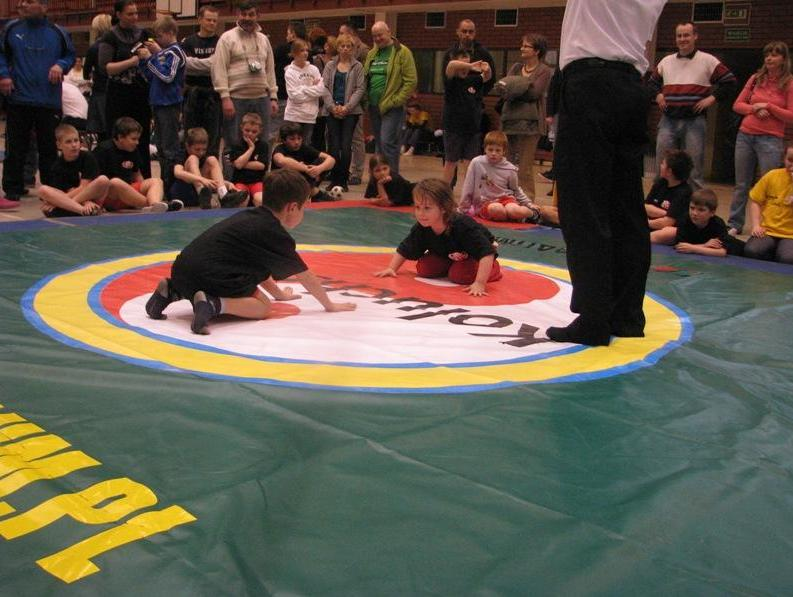
Children's exhibition tournament

Koluchstyl or Koluchstyle is a martial art based on sumo and ju-jitsu, created in the early 21st century in Poland. The discipline was created by martial arts expert Wiesław Koluch. The name of the martial art comes from the founder's surname.

The discipline has spread to various countries and is practiced by both children and adults in, among others, Indonesia, Russia, Europe, and some countries in Africa.

== History ==
According to the author of the discipline's rules, the concept of creating a new martial art originated as early as 2005. However, it gained popularity after the first Polish Championships, which took place in May 2009.

In 2014, the World Koluchstyl Organization was established, with Wiesław Koluch serving as its president and Aleksandr Medved as its honorary president, a three-time Olympic champion and seven-time world wrestling champion.

The second World Championships in 2015 featured participants from 37 countries, including Poland, Latvia, Lithuania, Russia, Ukraine, Kyrgyzstan, and Georgia. In the same year, Koluchstyl was introduced to Indonesia. In 2016, the first Asian Championships were held in Indonesia's capital, Jakarta.

The third World Championships were held with the support of the United World Wrestling Federation and in parallel with the World Games 2017 in Wrocław, although Koluchstyl itself was not included as an official World Games discipline. In 2017, the Polish Championships were also held, featuring competitors from 23 clubs.

In 2018, the 10th Jubilee Polish Championships took place. Members of the national team later participated in the 2nd Open Asian Koluchstyl Championships, which were held during the Asian Games in Jakarta.

Since 2022, championships for uniformed services in Koluchstyl have been held.

In 2023, before the 4th International Heart of the Earth Medal Gala, the International Koluchstyl Congress was held.

In 2024, the 4th World Koluchstyl Championships will be held in Ulaanbaatar.

== Scope of the discipline ==
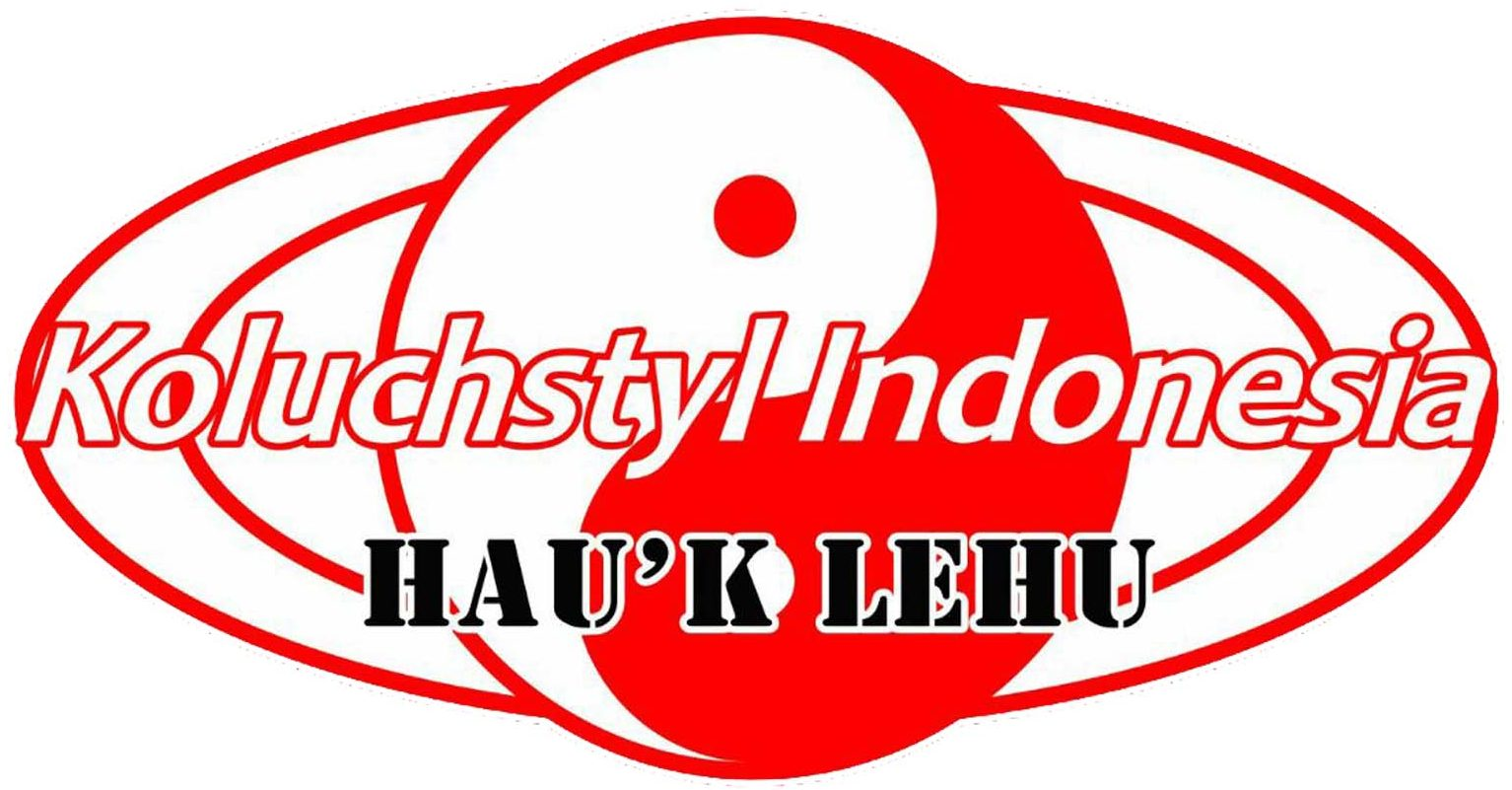
Koluchstyl Indonesia logo

The largest Koluchstyl tournament in terms of the number of participants is held regularly in Kleosin, Poland, where for two days children from local schools compete on three mats. In 2017, around 1,000 children competed in Koluchstyl as part of the Young Warriors of Podlasie event.

The discipline has spread beyond the borders of Poland, including to Africa. In Indonesia, various organizations bringing together people who practice Koluchstyl are active.

The Polish discipline appeared at various international events: TAFISA 2012 (Lithuania), World Combat Games 2013 (Russia), TAFISA 2016 (Indonesia), and World Games Plaza 2017 (Poland).

  1. Fighting style

Koluchstyl is a martial art practiced in two forms: sport (ground fighting) and combat (self-defense using weapons such as a baton, stick, or knife).

Competitors also come from disciplines such as judo, wrestling, jujitsu, sumo, sambo, MMA, grappling, BJJ, karate, and taekwondo.

  1. Sport fighting
    1. Competition area – mat

Sport fighting in Koluchstyl takes place on a circular mat with a diameter of 230 cm for children and youth up to 16 years of age, and 280 cm for female and male competitors over the age of 16.

    1. Competitor's attire

The attire consists of a short-sleeved T-shirt in yellow, white, navy blue, or black; judo or karate trousers in blue or white; and a martial arts belt. For hygiene reasons, white socks are mandatory.

=== Belts and Ranks ===
The official regulations specify three types of ranks: student **KYU**, master **DAN**, and honorary **DAN**. Six belt colors are associated with these ranks:

- Yellow – 5 KYU for children and youth up to 15 years of age;
- Orange – 4 KYU;
- Green – 3 KYU;
- Blue – 2 KYU;
- Brown – 1 KYU;
- Black – I DAN to V DAN.

=== Competition Rules ===
In the sport version, competitors fight only on the ground, with at least one knee touching the mat at all times. A match consists of three one-minute rounds, with victory awarded to the competitor who wins two rounds. Breaks between rounds last 15 seconds.

Koluchstyl competitors use approximately 100 techniques, including chokes, joint locks on all arm and leg joints (including finger locks, requiring a grip on at least three fingers), rolling an opponent out of the circle, lifting, and pins (pins last 10 seconds, and a competitor may be immobilized on their back, stomach, or side).

Each round may end in various ways, including by submission (tapping out), pushing the opponent out of the circle, a pin, or, if the full round time expires, by the judges' decision.

Children and youth up to 16 years of age may use only pushing, pinning, rolling, and lifting techniques during matches. Joint locks and chokes are prohibited.

Matches take place in a circle with a diameter of 280 cm, or 230 cm for children and youth competitions.

=== Weight Classes (Europe) ===
- Women: 56 kg, 64 kg, 73 kg, +73 kg.
- Men: 67 kg, 73 kg, 82 kg, 91 kg, 109 kg, +109 kg.

== Bibliography ==
- Wiesław Koluch (2010), Competition Regulations (in Polish), koluchstyl.pl
- Piotr Feczko (2011-05-18), Curiosity: Koluchstyl (in Polish), www.sporty-walki.org, archived from the original on 2015-09-24
