= Huka-huka =

Brazilian folk wrestling style

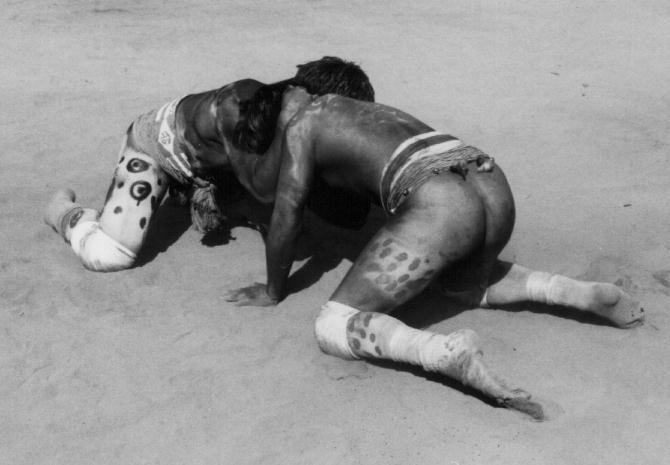
- Huka-huka fight during a Kuarup ceremony
- Focus: grappling
- Hardness: contact sport
- Country of origin: Brazil

Huka-huka is a Brazilian folk wrestling style of the indigenous people of Xingu, in the state of Mato Grosso. It is performed as a ritual fight during the ceremony of Kuarup.

== Rules ==
Huka-huka starts with the participants on their knees. It begins when the owner of the fight, a male chief, walks to the center of the arena and calls his opponents by name. The fighters kneel rotating clockwise in a circle facing the opponent, until they look at each other and cling, trying to lift the opponent and knock him to the ground The fight is performed by either men and women.

== Huka huka as a martial art ==
Huka huka is being introduced, experimentally, in the formation of São Paulo State Military Police. The fight is also being studied by mixed martial arts practitioners.
