= Cumberland and Westmorland wrestling =

Traditional wrestling style in England

Cumberland and Westmorland Wrestling
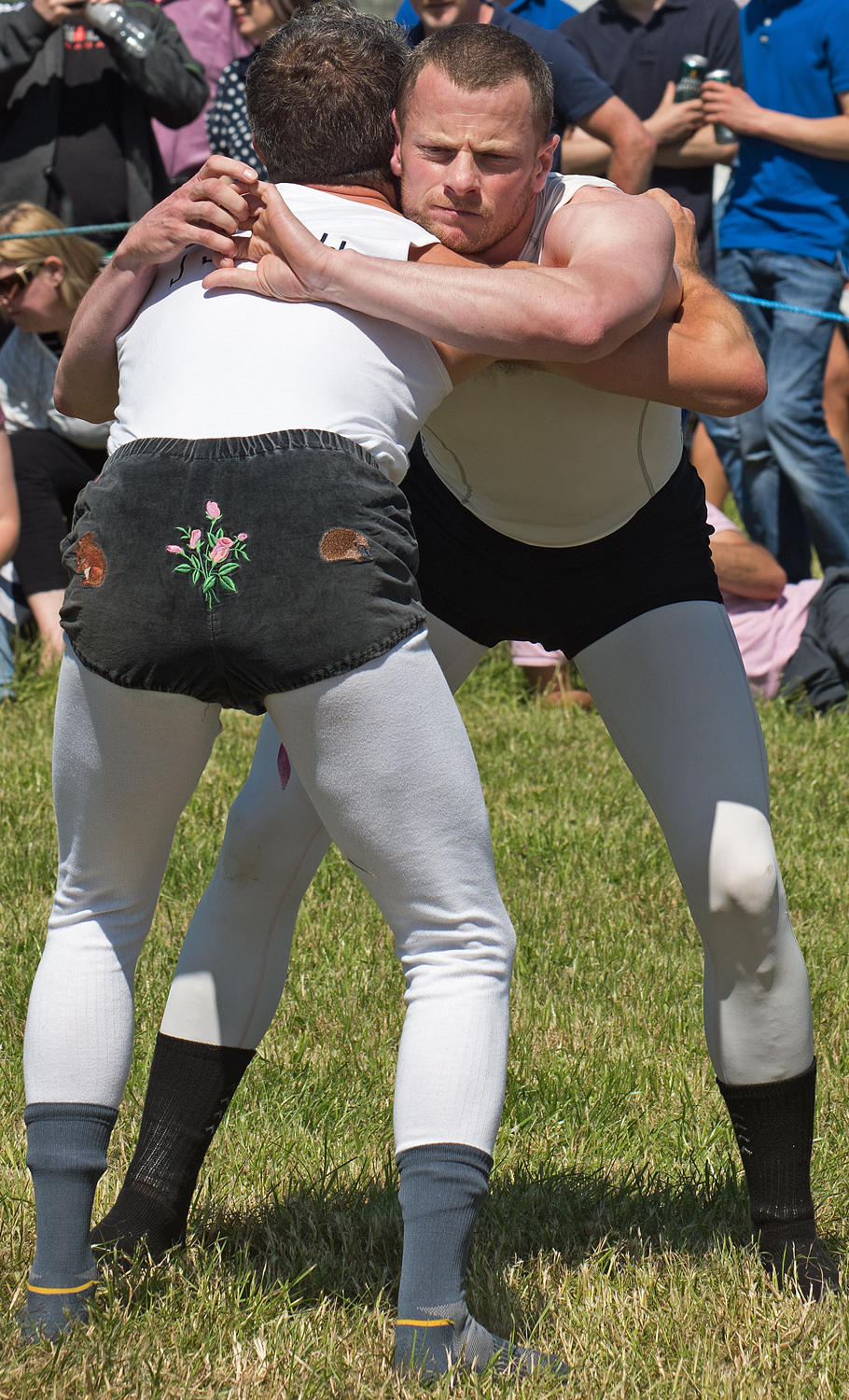
- Focus: Wrestling/Grappling
- Country of origin: England
- Olympic sport: No

Cumberland and Westmorland wrestling, commonly known as Cumberland wrestling or Cumbrian wrestling, is an ancient and well-practised tradition in the traditional English counties of Cumberland and Westmorland. It bears enough of a resemblance to Scottish Backhold, which is practised just north of the border, for them to be classed under the joint heading North Country style.

== Origins ==
The origin of the North Country style of wrestling is a matter of debate, however most historians associate it with a long standing Celtic tradition, especially due to similarities with the Cornish and Gouren styles and the Fédération International des Luttes Celtique classes Cumberland wrestling as Celtic.

== Rules ==
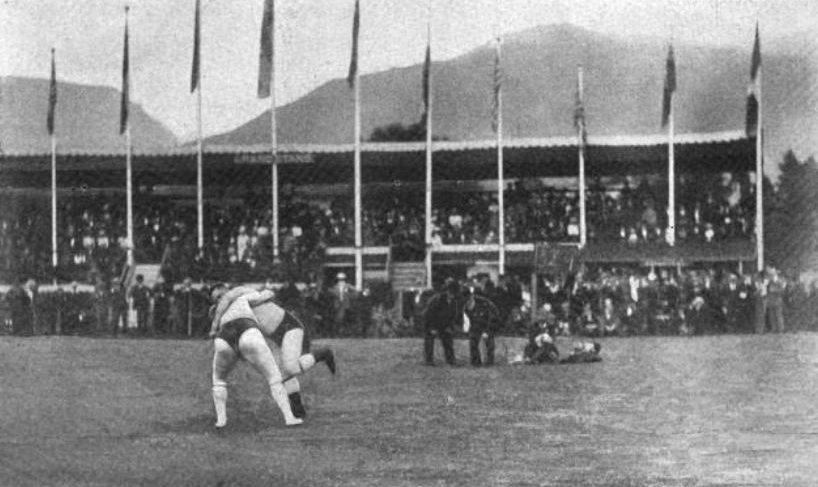
Championship at Grasmere in 1900

The starting backhold position involves the wrestlers standing chest to chest, grasping each other around the body with their chins on their opponent's right shoulder. The right arm of each contestant is positioned under his opponent's left arm. Once the grip is taken the umpire gives the signal to start the contest by calling "en guard", then "wrestle". The wrestlers attempt to unbalance their opponent, or make them lose their hold, using methods such as lifting throws known as "hipes", twisting throws such as "buttocks" and trips like the inside click, cross click, back heel or outside stroke. This is known as a "fall". If any part of a wrestler's body touches the ground aside from his feet then he loses. If both fall down at once the last to hit the ground is deemed the winner. If it is unclear which wrestler hit the ground first the fall is disqualified and must be started again. This is known as a "dog fall". A win can also be achieved if either party loses his grip on the other while his opponent still retains his hold.

The traditional costume consists of long johns and an embroidered vest with a velvet centre piece over the top. Matches are usually decided by the best of three falls.

Competitions were traditionally held during New Years celebrations and on Midsummers day, with the chief bouts known as the Melmerby and Langwathby Rounds. Famous wrestlers when the style became widely known, in the 18th century, included Adam Dodd of Langwathby Mill and Abraham Brown of Bampton school who was Britain's first middle-class wrestling hero. In the 21st century, Cumberland and Westmorland wrestling, along with other aspects of Lakeland Sports culture are practised at The Annual Grasmere Sports and Show, a meeting held since 1852 on the August Bank Holiday, and which has never been cancelled except during the years of World Wars I and II and the Covid 19 pandemic (2020 & 2021), and at several other Cumbrian and Northumbrian country gatherings such as the Cumberland Show, Westmorland County Show, Wasdale Fair, Dalston Show and Alwinton Border Shepherds Show.

== See also ==
- Cornish wrestling
- Lancashire wrestling
- Devon wrestling
- Scottish Backhold
- Glima
- Gouren
