= Scottish backhold =

Wrestling discipline

Scottish Backhold Wrestling
- Focus: Grappling
- Country of origin: Scotland
- Creator: Willie Baxter, Various
- Olympic sport: No

Scottish Backhold is a style of folk wrestling originating in Scotland. The wrestlers grip each other around the chest and shoulders at the back, with the right hand under the opponent's left arm and left arm over, the chin resting on the opposite right shoulder, and the hands in an S-grip hold. The bout is controlled by a central referee and two judges all of equal standing. Falls are decided by a majority of three rule, with no conferring. When the referee is sure that both wrestlers have taken a firm grip, he shouts "HOLD" and the bout starts. Should either wrestler break his hold or touch the ground with any part of his body except the soles of their feet, he/she loses. If both wrestlers hit the ground or mat at the same time, a "Dog Fall" is declared and the fall is wrestled again immediately. There is no ground work and the bouts are usually best of five falls.

Since 1985, there has been a Celtic organisation—La Fédération Internationale des Luttes Celtiques FILC—which combines the Scottish Backhold and Breton Gouren forms of wrestling. The Scottish Wrestling Bond publishes the rules of backhold wrestling.

There are many clubs around Scotland that coach and practise the sport of backhold wrestling; there are popular clubs in Edinburgh, Carnoustie, Glasgow and Hamilton. There are many Highland games through the summer months which attract athletes from all over the world. Apart from the FILC member countries, other countries such as Austria, Congo, Leon and the Canary Islands in Spain, Brittany in France, Iceland, Ireland, Sardinia in Italy, Sweden, Singapore, Friesland in the Netherlands, Hungary, United States, England, and many more are represented.

== See also ==
- Cumberland and Westmorland wrestling
- Dirk dance
- Historical fencing in Scotland
- Irish wrestling
