= Gowd-e Zurkhaneh =

Central section of a Zurkhaneh

Zurkhaneh Pit
- گود زورخانه
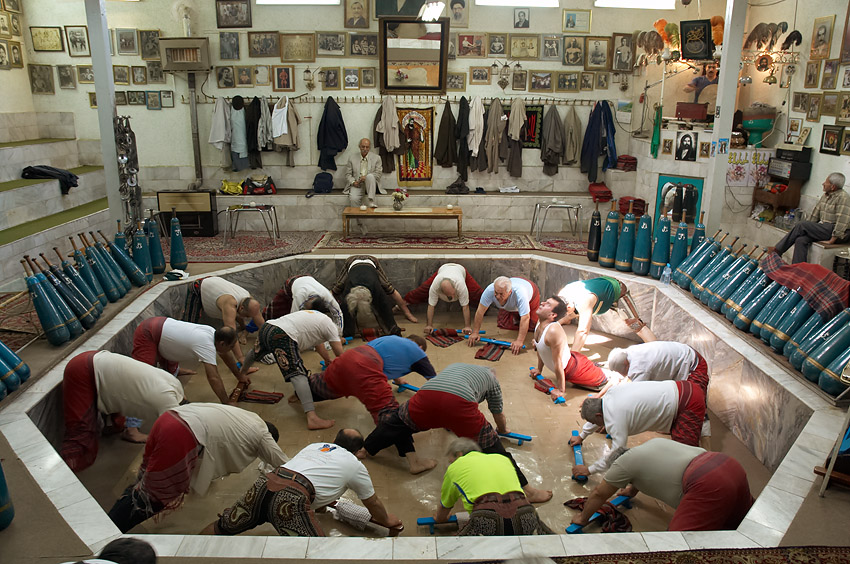
- Pahlevani athletes performing Shena inside the Zurkhaneh pit

General information
- Architectural style: Traditional
- Location: Inside the Zurkhaneh, Iran
- Year built: Pre-Islamic era

The Zurkhaneh pit (Persian: گود زورخانه, romanized: Gowd-e Zurkhaneh) is the central section of a Zurkhaneh, where athletes (pahlevans and wrestlers) in Iran practice and perform traditional martial and athletic exercises. The pit is usually built in a circular, polygonal, or shallow rectangular shape, and it is set lower than the surrounding floor so that the athletes remain in the direct sight of the morshed (master) during performance.

== History ==
The origins of Zurkhaneh sports date back to the pre-Islamic era and the Iranian chivalric (pahlevani) culture. The pit played a key role in training warriors and wrestlers. In the past, the morshed (master) or elder sat beside the pit, accompanying the exercises with rhythmic tonbak beats and reciting epic poetry to guide and encourage the athletes. The poems he recites are part of the art of Zurkhaneh literature and transmit ethical and social teachings. Any social class or religious background can participate in the Pahlevani ritual, and each group has close ties to the community and works to help those in need.

== Structure ==
A Zurkhaneh pit generally has the following characteristics:

- Circular or rectangular shape with a solid wooden or earthen floor
- Built lower than the surrounding level for direct sightline with the morshed
- A designated place for the morshed (sardam) located beside or above the pit
- Surrounding area reserved for storing traditional equipment and training tools

== Role in sport ==
The Zurkhaneh pit is the main space for the performance of traditional Iranian martial and athletic practices such as:

- Traditional Iranian wrestling
- Meel swinging
- Kabadeh keshi
- Spinning (charkh)
- Stone lifting exercises
- Strength and combat drills
- Zurkhaneh-style push-ups (shena)

The morshed maintains rhythm and order through drumming and epic poetry, synchronizing the athletes’ movements and enhancing their motivation.

== Cultural significance ==
Beyond its athletic function, the Zurkhaneh pit is a space for the transmission of moral values and Iranian chivalric (pahlevani) ethics. The rituals and practices performed in the pit symbolise respect for the master, discipline, teamwork, and the passing of traditions to future generations.

== See also ==
- Morshed (Zurkhaneh)
- Zurkhaneh
- Varzesh-e Pahlavani
- Shahnameh
