= Zarb-e Zurkhaneh =

Traditional Persian percussion instrument

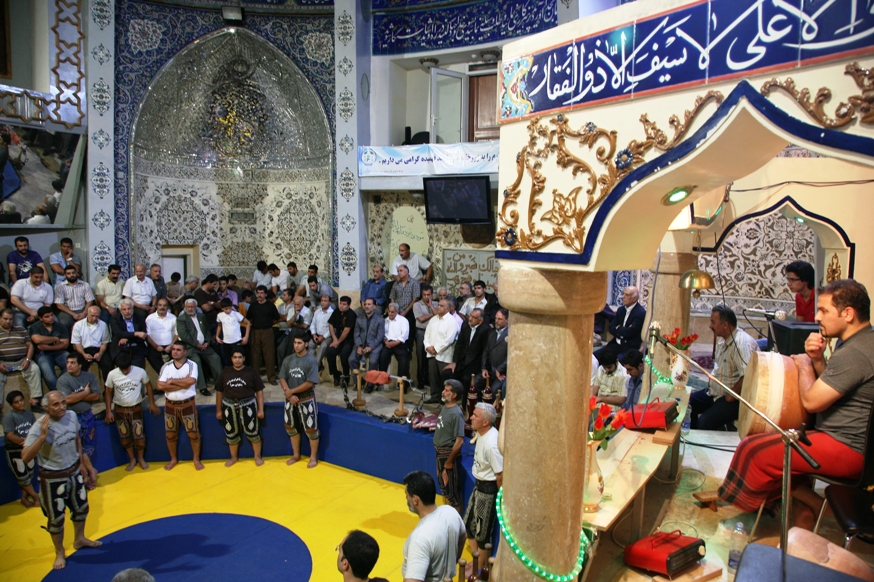
A zurkhaneh in Tehran. The morshed and the zarb (drum) are on the right.

The Zarb-e Zurkhaneh (Persian: ضرب زورخانه) is a traditional percussion instrument used in Zurkhaneh (Iran's traditional gymnasiums). It is played by the Morshed (master) of the zurkhaneh to provide rhythm for athletes performing traditional physical exercises. The morshed accompanies the beats with heroic poetry or spiritual chants, while athletes synchronize their movements accordingly.

== Construction ==
The zarb-e zurkhaneh is traditionally made from a large clay bowl shaped like a vase or pitcher. A goatskin drumhead is stretched over the opening to create the striking surface. The drum typically weighs between 10 and 20 kilograms.

It is crucial that the drum remains perfectly round, as any cracks or warping can ruin the tone. To prepare the skin, it is first tanned and then soaked in water until softened. The wet skin is then stretched tightly across the rim and glued with a traditional adhesive called Sirish (a kind of natural glue). Finally, it is secured and tightened using cloth strips or a lang (a type of bandage-like cloth).

== Rhythmic Styles ==
Two primary rhythmic styles are recognized in zurkhaneh drumming:

1. Traditional rhythms
2. Modern (contemporary) rhythms

Today, most morsheds use modern rhythms, and fewer perform the older, traditional patterns. Rhythms typically alternate between "zir" (high tones produced near the rim of the drum) and "bam" (bass tones from the center).

A skilled morshed must also have knowledge of Persian classical music modal systems (dastgahs) and be familiar with various rhythmic patterns and musical notes.

== See also ==
- Zurkhaneh
- Kabadeh
- Pahlevani and zoorkhaneh rituals
