= Morshed (Zurkhaneh) =

Persian poetry reciter at Zurkhanehs

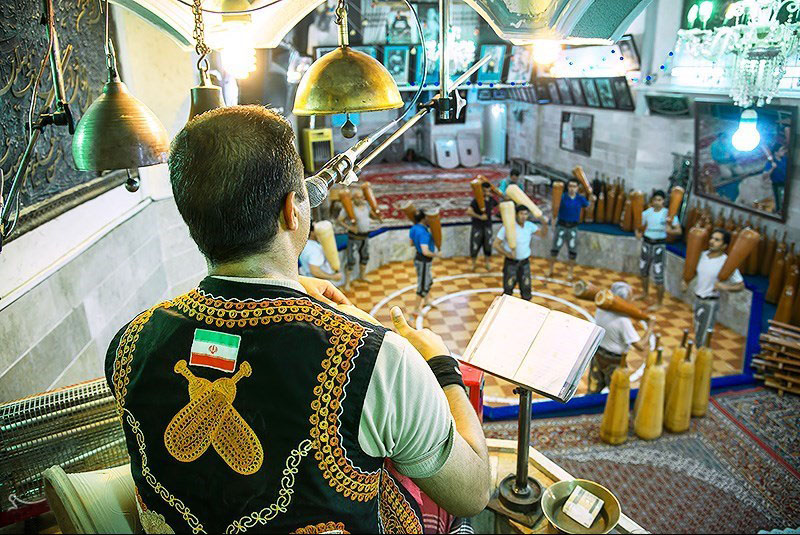
- A morshed performing in a traditional Zurkhaneh

Sport
- Country: Iran
- Sport: Varzesh-e Pahlavani
- Position: Zarb-gir (drum player) - Leader, drummer, reciter

A Morshed (Persian: مرشد) in the context of the Zurkhaneh (traditional Iranian gymnasium) is the person who plays a large goblet drum (zarb) and recites epic poetry while athletes perform.

The morshed usually sits above the training pit (sardam) and accompanies the exercises with rhythmic drum beats and heroic verses, often selected from the Shahnameh by Ferdowsi. His voice and rhythms guide the athletes and motivate them in their exercises.

Historically, the morshed or kohneh-savar (literally “old rider”) was also responsible for the training and instruction of wrestlers and strongmen. During the session, the kohneh-savar carried a cloth over the shoulder and held a wooden staff called ta‘līmi, sitting by the training pit to supervise and instruct. These elders were among the most experienced and skillful athletes. It is said that the contemporary morshed was formerly called a zarb-gir (“drum keeper”).

== See also ==
- Zurkhaneh
- Pahlevani and zoorkhaneh rituals
- Shahnameh
- Gowd-e Zurkhaneh
