= Wrestling in Dagestan =

Wrestling is one of the most popular sports in the Russian republic of Dagestan. Despite its relatively small population of approximately 3.1 million, the Republic of Dagestan has historically produced a disproportionate number of Olympic and world champions in freestyle wrestling. The first wrestler from Dagestan to win a world title was five-time freestyle wrestling world champion, Ali Aliyev. The republic has also produced a number of world champions in sambo, the third international style of wrestling to be recognized by UWW.

In recent years, mixed martial arts (MMA) has become popular in Dagestan due to wrestling being an important component of it. The first UFC champion from Dagestan was Khabib Nurmagomedov, who greatly utilized wrestling to become UFC Lightweight Champion and retired undefeated. Current UFC Welterweight Champion Islam Makhachev also trained with Khabib under his father Abdulmanap Nurmagomedov. MMA fighter Karimula Barkalaev, so-far the only Russian to have won gold at the ADCC Submission Fighting World Championships, was also raised in Dagestan.

== Background ==
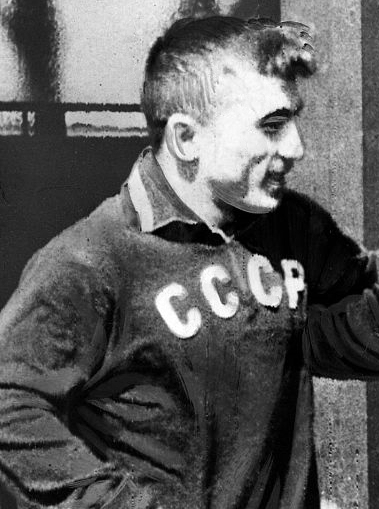
Ali Aliyev

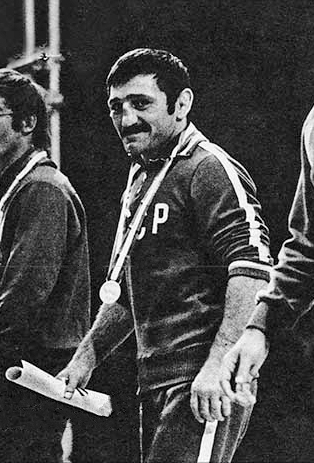
Zagalav Abdulbekov

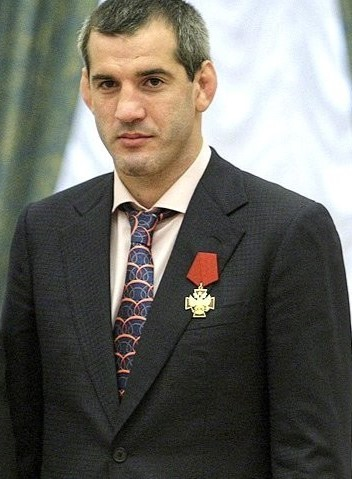
Buvaisar Saitiev

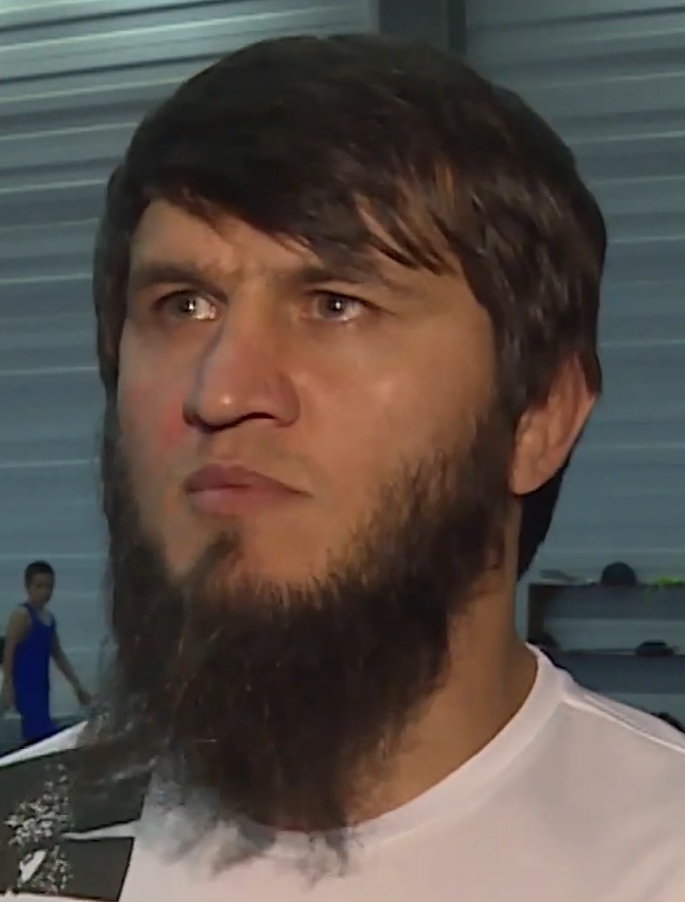
Mavlet Batirov

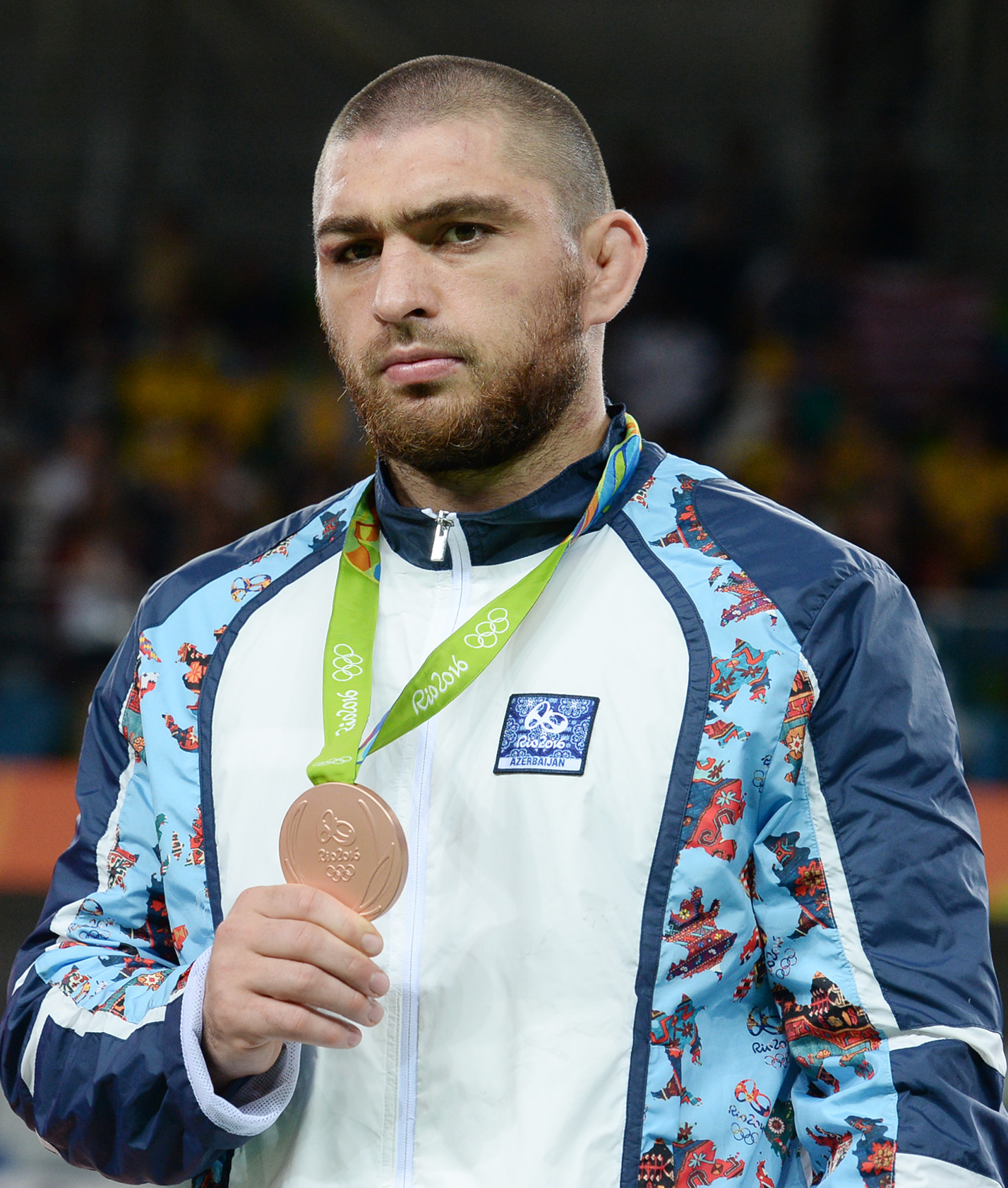
Sharif Sharifov

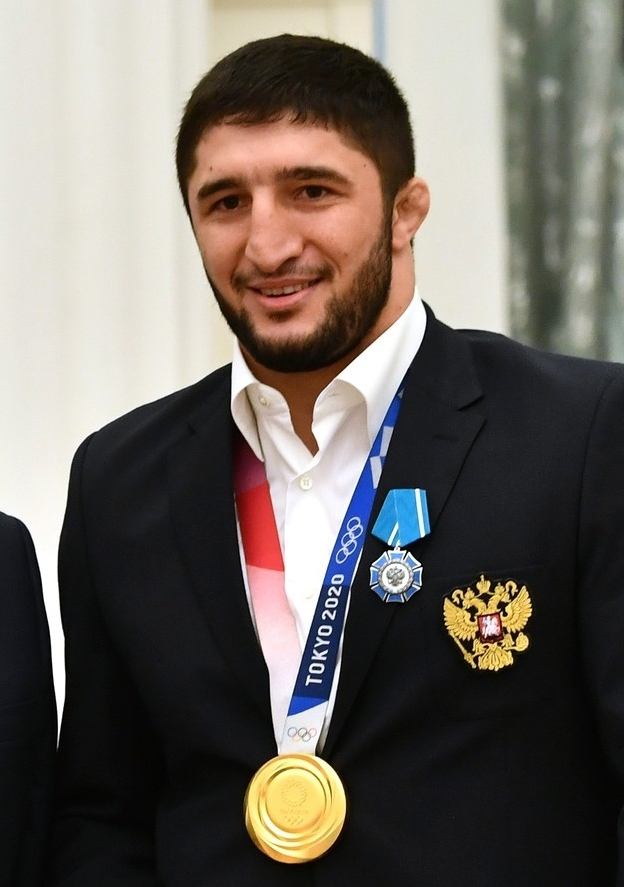
Abdulrashid Sadulaev

Wrestling plays a significant role in the lives of people in Dagestan. Men from the area have stated they have always wrestled in traditional bouts between mountain villages. The location of Dagestan in the Caucasus region has put it in a position that is constantly at the threat of war historically and therefore an attitude towards fighting was needed. Neighbouring nations such Georgia, Azerbaijan and Armenia as well as neighboring regions such as Ossetia, Chechnya, Ingushetia and Abkhazia also have significant participation in wrestling. However, Dagestan stands out even among its neighbours.

In the late period of the Russian Empire, notable wrestlers included Al-Klych Hasayev, Osman Abdurakhmanov, and Sali Suleiman (Махтулаев Мама), who is the namesake of the Dagestan Ministry of Sports' highest award. During the Soviet Union era, wrestling was not given much attention; few villages had gyms, and the sport withered.

After the dissolution of the Soviet Union, wrestling had a resurgence in Dagestan as it was used as a method to prevent youths from getting involved with Islamic terrorism. It is considered as an alternative, positive vision of fighting and Islam. Those that succeed in wrestling at high levels could see their lives entirely changed. New gyms were built, with even smaller villages having their own ones. When the International Olympic Committee considered removing wrestling from the Olympics, many in Dagestan were concerned that without wrestling, many youths would end up on the streets or worse, like participating in terrorism.

Wrestling attracts many different ethnic groups in the region to train together. Every morning, dozens of boys and young men turn out to run on the beach near the Caspian Sea as part of their cardio exercise. On weekends, they would train on mountain trails. Wrestling in Dagestan uses a finely-tuned methodology developed over centuries and has a lot of cultural wrestling influences. Conditioning is plyometric based and focuses on movements and exercises optimized for wrestling. There is an emphasis on technique such as clinch work, hand fighting and counterattacking.

Many wrestlers after retiring choose to become coaches and mentors. Wrestling coaches are held in high esteem and are considered father figures and moral guides for youths. Coaches and athletes pray together at gyms and some wrestlers see wrestling as having religious significance. An example is Khadzhimurad Magomedov, who won a gold medal at the 1996 Summer Olympics and afterwards became a coach with the Russian team while raising a family in Moscow. In Makhachkala, there are over 50,000 competitive wrestlers.

Athletes from across the world have moved to Dagestan to train such as Frank Chamizo and Saifedine Alekma. There can be multiple champion-level wrestlers to train with in a single gym.

Due to popular demand and overcapacity, wrestling gyms have been forced to turn newcomers away. Due to limited spaces on the national team, wrestlers from Dagestan have competed for other countries such as Sharif Sharifov, Albert Saritov, Magomedmurad Gadzhiev, and Magomed Ibragimov. During the wrestling event of the 2024 Summer Olympics, despite Russia being banned from participating due to the Russian invasion of Ukraine, three gold medals out of the six men’s freestyle wrestling weight categories went to wrestlers from Dagestan who represented other countries. They were Akhmed Tazhudinov representing Bahrain, Razambek Zhamalov representing Uzbekistan and Magomed Ramazanov representing Bulgaria.

== Notable figures ==
=== Freestyle wrestling ===
One of the most prominent Dagestani wrestlers is five-time freestyle wrestling world champion Ali Aliyev. He was the first wrestler from Dagestan to win a world title, which he won at the 1959 World Wrestling Championships. The Ali Aliyev Sport Complex is named after him and hosts an international freestyle wrestling tournament in memory of him each year.

Zagalav Abdulbekov was the first wrestler from Dagestan to win an Olympic gold medal in wrestling, which was done at the 1972 Summer Olympics.

Buvaisar Saitiev is considered the greatest freestyle wrestler in history as a three-time Olympic champion and six-time world champion.

Abdulrashid Sadulaev is the second most accomplished wrestler from Dagestan as a two-time Olympic champion and six-time world champion. He is currently still competing professionally.

==== Olympic and world champions from Dagestan ====
#	Athlete	Olympics			World Championships		
#	Athlete	Gold	Silver	Bronze	Gold	Silver	Bronze
1	Buvaisar Saitiev	3 — 1996, 2004, 2008			6 — 1995, 1997, 1998, 2001, 2003, 2005		
2	Abdulrashid Sadulaev	2 — 2016, 2020			6 — 2014, 2015, 2018, 2019, 2021, 2024	1 — 2017	
3	Khadzhimurat Gatsalov	1 — 2004			5 — 2005, 2006, 2007, 2009, 2013	1 — 2010	1 — 2014
4	Vladimir Yumin	1 — 1976			4 — 1974, 1977, 1978, 1979	1 — 1975	1 — 1973
5	Mavlet Batirov	2 — 2004, 2008			1 — 2007		1 — 2006
6	Sharif Sharifov	1 — 2012		1 — 2016	1 — 2011	1 — 2019	1 — 2009
7	Zagalav Abdulbekov	1 — 1972			2 — 1971, 1973		1 — 1969
8	Adam Saitiev	1 — 2000			2 — 1999, 2002		
9	Zaur Uguev	1 — 2020			2 — 2018, 2019		
10	Khadzhimurad Magomedov	1 — 1996			1 — 2001	1 — 1999	
11	Saypulla Absaidov	1 — 1980			1 — 1981		
12	Sagid Murtazaliev	1 — 2000			1 — 1999		
13	Ramazan Şahin	1 — 2008			1 — 2007		
14	Akhmed Tazhudinov	1 — 2024			1 — 2023		
15	Dzhamal Otarsultanov	1 — 2012					
16	Magomedgasan Abushev	1 — 1980					
17	Bakhtiyar Akhmedov	1 — 2008					
18	Shirvani Muradov	1 — 2008					
19	Magomed Ramazanov	1 — 2024					
20	Murad Umakhanov	1 — 2000					
21	Razambek Zhamalov	1 — 2024					

=== Sambo ===
Alongside freestyle wrestling, the Dagestan republic has produced a number of champions in sport sambo and combat sambo as well as many Masters of Sport and Honored Coaches. Notable sambists include: Khabib Nurmagomedov, Shamil Zavurov, Ikram Aliskerov, Rasul Mirzaev, Ali Bagautinov, and coach Abdulmanap Nurmagomedov.

== Mixed martial arts ==
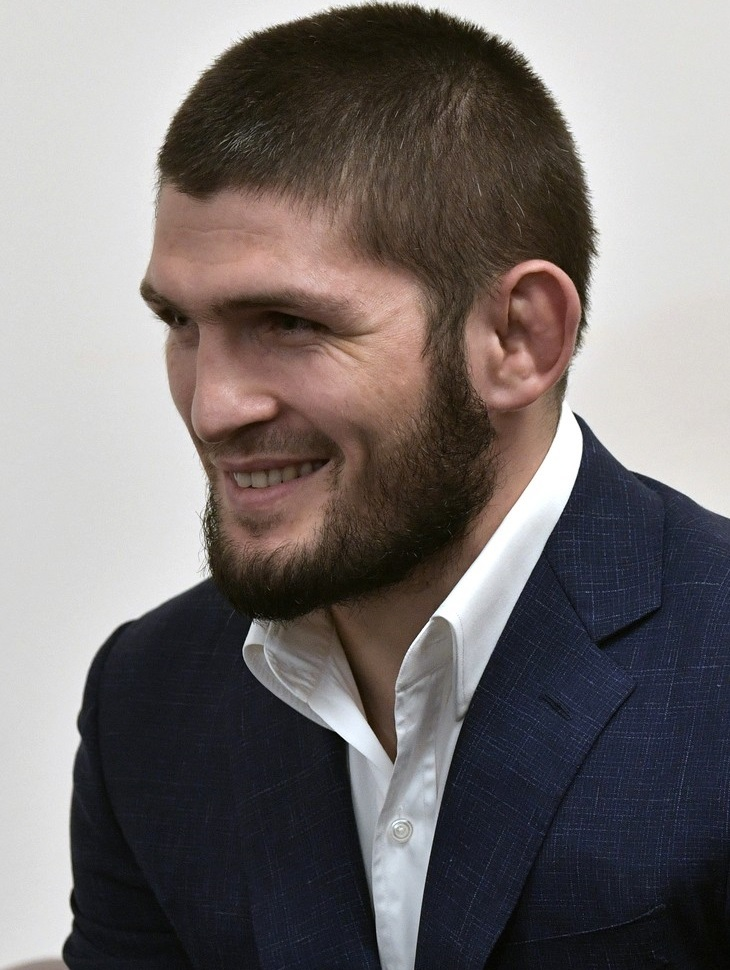
Khabib Nurmagomedov

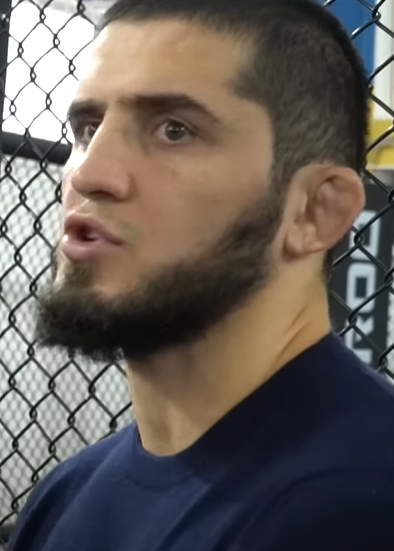
Islam Makhachev

Wrestling is considered an important component of MMA due to its effectiveness in the sport. Athletes from Dagestan who had previously trained in wrestling are able to transfer and apply their skillset to the sport of MMA to achieve success.

The most famous figure in this field is Khabib Nurmagomedov, who has credited much of his success to freestyle wrestling, along with his skills in sambo and judo. He was the first Russian national as well as the first Muslim to win a UFC championship title. (Note: Nurmagomedov was the second Russian UFC champion overall. Oleg Taktarov was the first Russian to become UFC champion after winning the UFC 6 tournament.) His fight against Conor McGregor at UFC 229 was the most anticipated in the sport's history, propelling Khabib to worldwide fame.

Volk Han demonstrated mastery of sambo in professional wrestling and during the early stages of MMA. He was the coach of many prominent MMA figures such as Fedor and Alexander Emelianenko, Sergei Kharitonov and Karimula Barkalaev. Growing up, he trained under Aliyev.

Nurmagomedov's long-time friend and training partner, Islam Makhachev also won the UFC Lightweight Championship. According to Makhachev, the United States has American football and Dagestan has wrestling.
