= Wrestling mythology =

Examples of wrestling in mythology

Wrestling bouts are described in some of the world's mythologies.

- The Epic of Gilgamesh in Sumerian literature features its hero Gilgamesh establishing his credibility as a leader after wrestling Enkidu. Other sculptures and literature from ancient Mesopotamia show that wrestling was a popular activity.
- The Iliad describes Aias and Odysseus wrestling against each other on the occasion of the funeral games of Patroclus. The match ends in a draw.
- In Greek Mythology, Theseus is said to have invented the art of wrestling. He would use his wrestling techniques to beat the likes of Cercyon the Arcadian and Polypemon.
- Cornish wrestling has a long history, with Geoffrey of Monmouth in Historia Regum Britanniae (c. 1139) describing Corineus, the legendary founder of Cornwall, as a man "of great courage and boldness, who, in an encounter with any person, even of gigantic stature, would immediately overthrow him, as if he were a child", and later tells the story of how Corineus wrestled a Cornish giant, Gogmagog or Goemagot upon the cliff top known as Lamm Goemagot.
- Another early description of wrestling appears in the Hebrew Book of Genesis (32:22-32). The passage depicts the patriarch Jacob wrestling with the Angel, for which Jacob was subsequently renamed Israel. (Israel translates to "wrestles (or strives) with God".)
- The Sanskrit epic Mahabharata describes the encounter between the accomplished wrestlers Bhima and Jarasandha; "grasping each other in various ways by means of their arms, and kicking each other with such violence as to affect the innermost nerves, they struck at each other's breasts with clenched fists. With bare arms as their only weapons roaring like clouds they grasped and struck each other like two mad elephants encountering each other with their trunks". In the same epic, Bhima would wrestle with and kill Kichaka, in revenge for harassing Draupadi.
- In Hinduism, Hanuman is held as the patron god of wrestling and martial arts. Many Akharas (wrestling schools) in India are dedicated to him. Hanuman wrestled with and killed many demons in Lanka during the war against Ravana, such as Lankini
- In the Hamzanama, also known as Dastan-e-Amir Hamza, various characters including the main protagonist Amir Hamza engage in wrestling or Pehlwani bouts as an ultimate display of strength. Amir Hamza himself wrestled with and subdued opponents like Landhaur bin Sa'dan, who would become his ally. He would also wrestle and defeat various Djinns and Devs during his journey in Mount Qaf.
- In the Prose Edda, the god Thor wrestles with, and is defeated by, Elli, the Norse personification of old age.
