= Kabadeh =

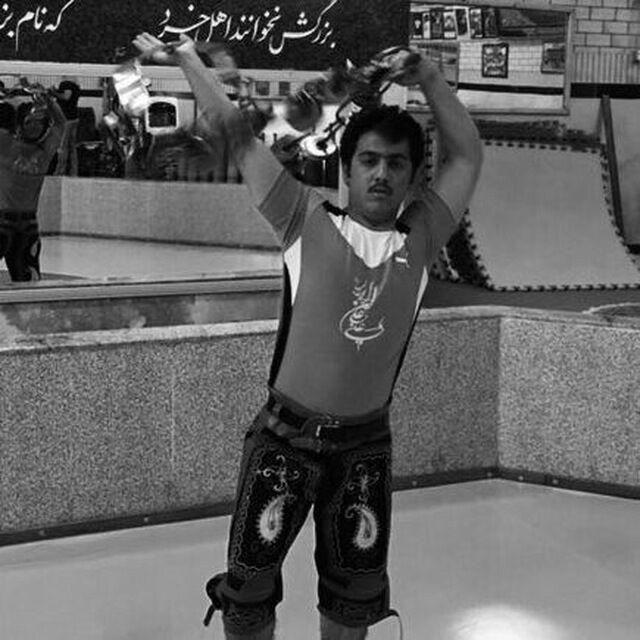
An Iranian Zurkhaneh athlete practicing with a kabadeh

Kabadeh (In Persian language: کباده) is one of the traditional training implements used in the Iranian martial art and athletic tradition known as Zurkhaneh or varzesh-e bastani. According to the Dehkhoda Dictionary, it was originally a type of practice bow used to strengthen the shoulders of archers.

The kabadeh consists of two main parts: a metallic frame resembling the body of a bow, and a chain section acting as its string. Its weight is intentionally designed to simulate the draw and hold strength required to repeatedly nock and shoot arrows during battle. The practitioner, referred to as a pahlavan (hero or warrior), uses the kabadeh to build endurance and upper body strength.

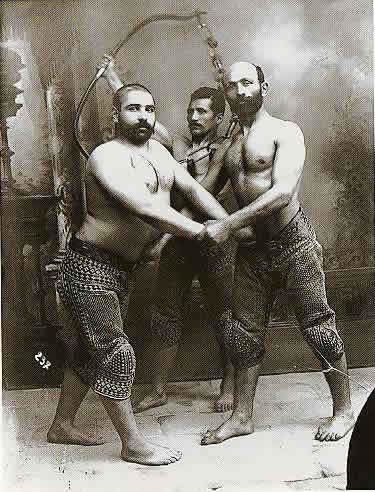
A kabadeh held by a warrior in the background

== Etymology ==
The word kabadeh in Persian refers to a "soft or flexible bow," specifically used for practice in drawing the bowstring.

== History ==
Kabadeh was developed by ancient Iranians to train for archery in times of peace. The design of early kabadehs was likely different from today's modern variants. During peacetime, warriors would gather at the Zurkhaneh a sacred gymnasium-like place to perform combat drills and strength-building routines. The kabadeh was used specifically to simulate the physical strain of repeatedly drawing a bowstring in battle. Pulling a bowstring itself is demanding; under combat conditions, Iranian warriors were expected to shoot up to a hundred arrows in a single engagement.

== Structure ==
The kabadeh is essentially a symbolic war bow. While early versions were likely simpler, modern kabadehs feature an iron arc (representing the bow's body), sometimes decorated with engravings. The string is a heavy metal chain, and additional metal rings are added for weight adjustment. In some designs, a central handle is included to help the athlete grip the chain more easily during practice.

== Types ==
Kabadehs vary primarily in the shape and decoration of the bow section. In one common type, the iron bow is a single, slightly curved rod resembling a simple wooden bow. Another, more ornate variant features a central handle with symmetrical bow-like extensions on each side, often adorned with engravings. This design is inspired by bows used during the Sasanian Empire and is more ceremonial in nature.

== Weight ==
There is no strict standard for kabadeh weight, but a typical kabadeh weighs around 14 kilograms, with a bow length of 150 centimeters and a chain length of 200 centimeters. Heavier kabadehs are made for veteran athletes. The current record for kabadeh lifting stands at 110 kilograms.

== Competitions ==
Since ancient times, competitions in varzesh-e bastani have included wrestling, meel swinging, and stone lifting. Kabadeh lifting contests are based on both the number of repetitions and the weight of the kabadeh used.

== Spiritual Significance ==
Sufi mystics and spiritual practitioners have regarded the kabadeh as a symbolic "bow of readiness" or "training bow" used to prepare both body and soul for the battle against inner and outer evil forces. The act of lifting the kabadeh is seen as a physical expression of readiness in the path of chivalry and spiritual struggle, central to the ethos of Iranian pahlevani (heroic code) and javānmardi (nobility of spirit).

== See also ==
- Kabadeh keshi
- Pahlevani and zoorkhaneh rituals
- Zourkhaneh
- Pahlevanpour Zurkhaneh
