= Wrestling =

Combat sports

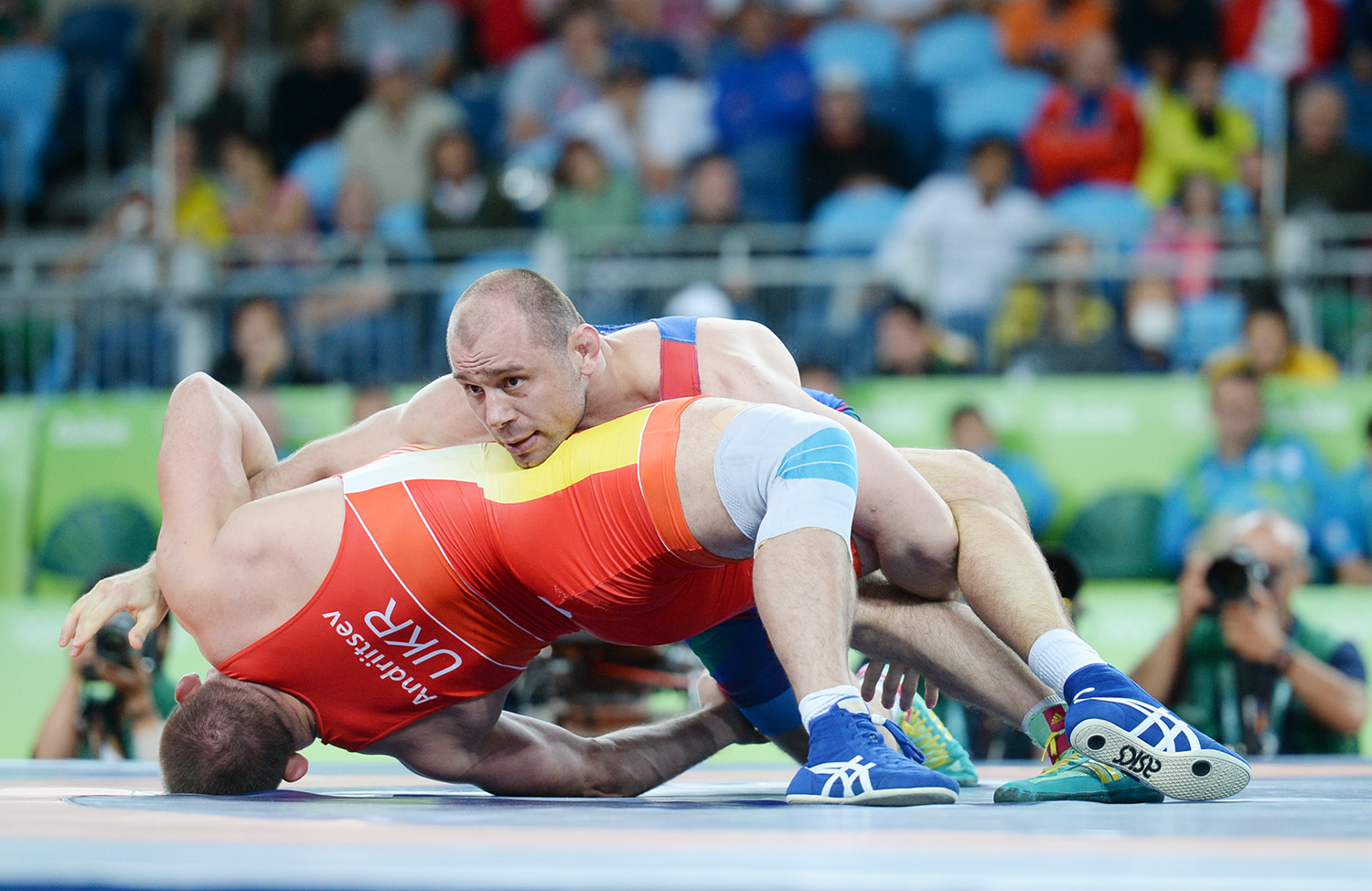
- Wrestling at the 2016 Summer Olympics
- Focus: Grappling
- Olympic sport: Freestyle, Greco-Roman, Judo and Sambo

Wrestling is a martial art, combat sport, and form of entertainment that involves grappling with an opponent and striving to obtain a position of advantage through different throws or techniques, within a given ruleset. Wrestling involves different grappling-type techniques, such as clinch fighting, throws and takedowns, joint locks, pins, and other grappling holds. Many different wrestling techniques have been incorporated into martial arts, combat sports, and military systems.

Wrestling comes in different forms, the most popular being professional wrestling, which is a form of athletic theatre. Other legitimate (Note: The term "wrestling" is most often widely used to specifically refer to predetermined professional wrestling, which is very different from the legitimate (or real-life) wrestling combat predominantly detailed in this article.) competitive forms include Olympic wrestling styles (Greco-Roman and Freestyle), Folk wrestling styles, and Submission wrestling styles. Wrestling first appeared in the ancient Olympic Games as an event during the 18th Olympiad in 708 BC. There are a wide range of styles with varying rules, with both traditional historic and modern styles. The term "wrestling" in Modern English originated from the late Old English term wræstlunge.

== History ==
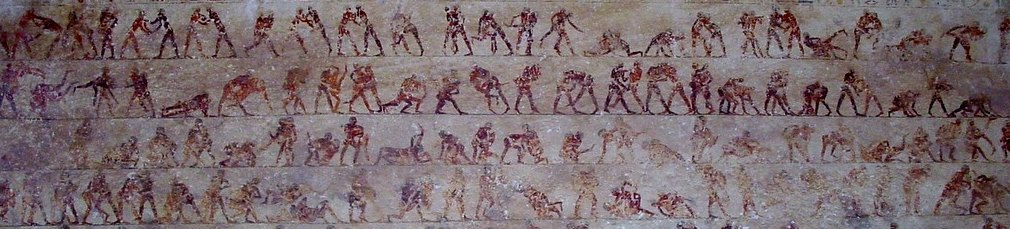
Detail of Ancient Egyptian wrestling scenes in tomb 15 (Baqet III) at Beni Hasan, c. 20th century BC

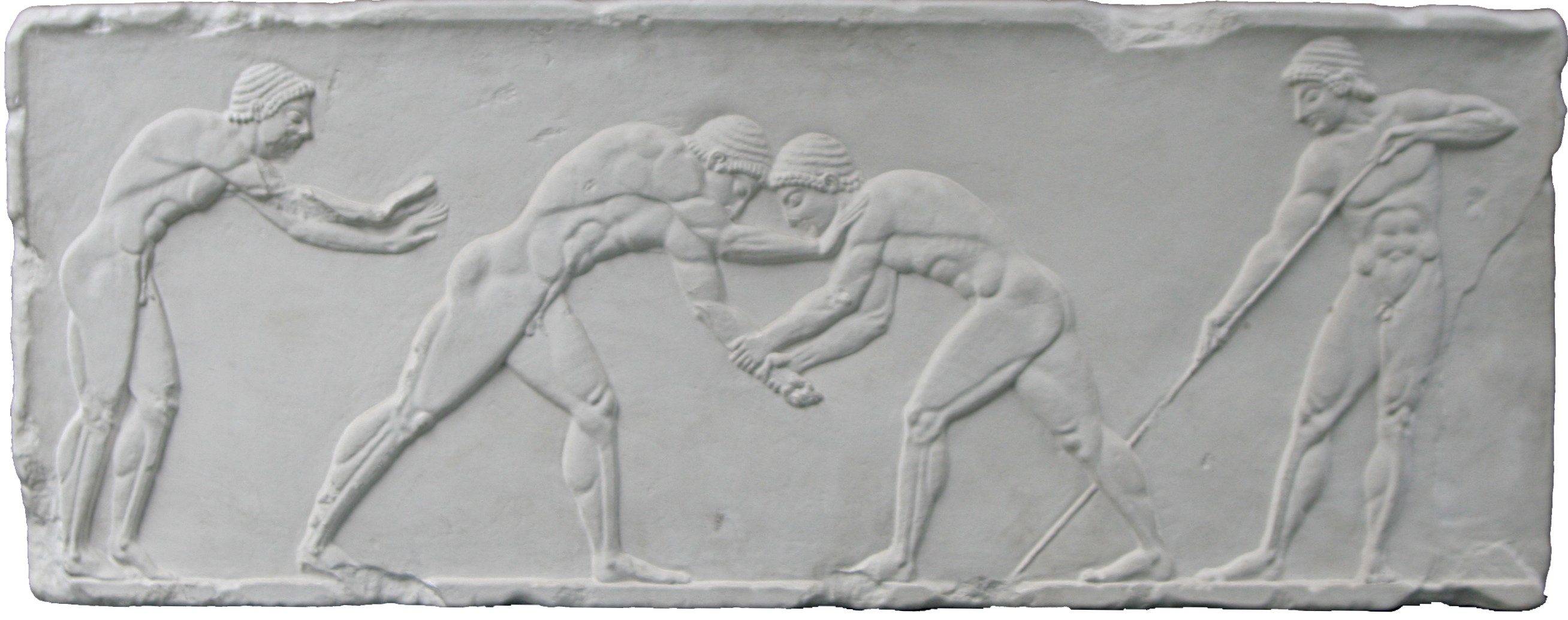
Wrestlers shown in the center on an Ancient Greek relief of the pentathlon, c. 500 BC

Wrestling represents one of the oldest forms of combat sport. The origins of wrestling go back around 15,000 to 17,000 years ago through cave drawings in France. While its foundational origins lie in global prehistory, different styles emerged independently throughout the world at different eras of human history. Babylonian and Egyptian reliefs show wrestlers using various holds known in the present-day sport. Literary references to wrestling occur as early as the Old Testament and the ancient Indian Vedas. In the Book of Genesis, the Patriarch Jacob is said to have wrestled with God or an angel. The Iliad, in which Homer recounts the Trojan War of the 13th or 12th century BC, also contains mentions of wrestling. Indian epics Ramayana and Mahabharata contain references to martial arts including wrestling. The Yellow Emperor fought the rebel Chi You using Shuai Jiao at the Battle of Zhoulu. This early style of combat was first called jiao di (butting with horns).

In Ancient Greece wrestling occupied a prominent place in legend, literature, and philosophy. Wrestling competition, brutal in many aspects, served as the focal sport of the ancient Olympic Games. Ancient Romans borrowed heavily from Greek wrestling, but eliminated much of its brutality through implementing different rules. Wrestling is referenced throughout both Ancient Greek and Roman literature. Many philosophers and leaders practiced wrestling and/or referenced the sport frequently in their works, most notably Plato, Socrates, Aristotle, Xenophon, Epictetus, Seneca, Plutarch, and Marcus Aurelius. Dicaearchus wrote that Plato wrestled at the Isthmian games. Many of Plato's dialogues are set in wrestling schools. Ancient Greek lyric poet Pindar wrote victory odes, grouped into four books named after the Olympian, Pythian, Isthmian, and Nemean Games – Panhellenic festivals held respectively at Olympia, Delphi, Corinth, and Nemea. These odes were composed to honor the men and youths who had enjoyed victories in wrestling, boxing, pankration and other athletic contests.

During the Middle Ages from the fifth to fifteenth century, wrestling remained popular and enjoyed the patronage of many royal families, including those of England, France, and Japan.

Early British settlers in America brought a strong wrestling tradition with them. The settlers also found wrestling to be popular among Native Americans. Amateur wrestling flourished throughout the early years of the North American colonies and would later serve as a popular activity at country fairs, holiday celebrations, and in military exercises. The first organized national wrestling tournament in the United States took place in New York City in 1888.

Wrestling has also been an event at every modern Olympic Games since the 1904 games in St. Louis, Missouri; Greco-Roman wrestling was contested at the first modern Olympics in 1896, but not at the 1900 games. The international governing body for the sport, United World Wrestling (UWW), was established in 1912 in Antwerp, Belgium as the International Federation of Associated Wrestling Styles (FILA). The first annual NCAA Wrestling Championships were held in 1928 in Ames, Iowa. USA Wrestling, located in Colorado Springs, Colorado, was established as the national governing body of U.S. amateur wrestling in 1983.

=== By country ===
- In Ancient Egypt, wrestling has been evidenced by documentation on tombs (c. 2300 BC) and Egyptian artwork (c. 2000–1085 BC).
- In Ancient Greece, Greek wrestling was a popular form of martial art (c. 1100 to 146 BC).
- Oil wrestling is the national sport of Turkey and can be traced back to Central Asia.
- After the Roman conquest of the Greeks, Greek wrestling was absorbed by the Roman culture and became Roman wrestling.
- Shuai jiao, a wrestling style originating in China, which according to legend, has a reported history of over 4,000 years.
- Arabic literature depicted Muhammad as a skilled wrestler, defeating a skeptic in a match at one point.
- The Byzantine emperor Basil I, according to court historians, won in wrestling against a boastful wrestler from Bulgaria in the eighth century.
- In 1520 at the Field of the Cloth of Gold pageant, Francis I of France threw fellow king Henry VIII of England in a wrestling match.
- The Lancashire style of folk wrestling may have formed the basis for Catch wrestling, also known as "catch as catch can." The Scots later formed a variant of this style, and the Irish developed the "collar-and-elbow" style which later found its way into the United States. This various styles would form what would become folkstyle wrestling, which is the most popular form of wrestling in the United States.
- A Frenchman (Note: Exbroyat of Lyon. He died in 1868. Another claim is that the founder of Greco-Roman wrestling was Frenchman Jean Broyasse (death 1872), according to the encyclopedia Gyldendals store konversasjonsleksikon, 1981, p. 2564.) "is generally credited with reorganizing European loose wrestling into a professional sport", Greco-Roman wrestling. This style which was finalized by the 19th century and by then, wrestling was featured in many fairs and festivals in Europe. Greco-Roman wrestling and contemporary freestyle wrestling were soon regulated in formal competitions, in part resulting from the rise of gymnasiums and athletic clubs.
- Starting in continental Europe, prize money was offered in large sums to the winners of Greco-Roman tournaments, with the style of freestyle wrestling spreading rapidly in the United Kingdom and in the United States during the late 1800s. Wrestling professionals soon increased the popularity of Greco-Roman and freestyle wrestling, worldwide. Greco-Roman wrestling was contested at the first modern Olympics in 1896. Freestyle wrestling became an Olympic event in 1904 and women's freestyle wrestling was added to the Olympics in 2004.
- Celtic wrestling has an extensive history, with wrestling being mentioned in the Tailteann Games dating back from somewhere between 1839 BC to 632 BC (academics disagree) to the 12th century AD when the Normans invaded. Various styles such as Cornish wrestling, Gouren, Collar-and-elbow wrestling, etc. are likely to have evolved from some common style.
- Since 1921, United World Wrestling (UWW) has regulated amateur wrestling as an athletic discipline, while professional wrestling, originally a legitimate sport, gradually became infused with theatrics but still requires athletic ability. Today, various countries around the world send national wrestling teams to the Olympics.
- In Switzerland the local derivate of the German ringen, called schwingen, is a popular folk sport with local Schwingfest where regional competitions are played throughout the country.

=== Mythology ===
Some of the earliest references to wrestling can be found in wrestling mythology.

- The Epic of Gilgamesh: Gilgamesh established his credibility as a leader, after wrestling Enkidu.
- Greek mythology celebrates the rise of Zeus as ruler of the earth after a wrestling match with his father, Cronus. Both Heracles and Theseus were famous for their wrestling against man and beast.
- The Mahabharata describes a malla-dwandwa (wrestling match) between the accomplished wrestlers Bhima and Jarasandha.
- Rustam of the Shahnameh (Book Of Kings) is regarded by Iranian pahlevans as the greatest wrestler.

=== Gallery ===
Historical wrestling in art and photography

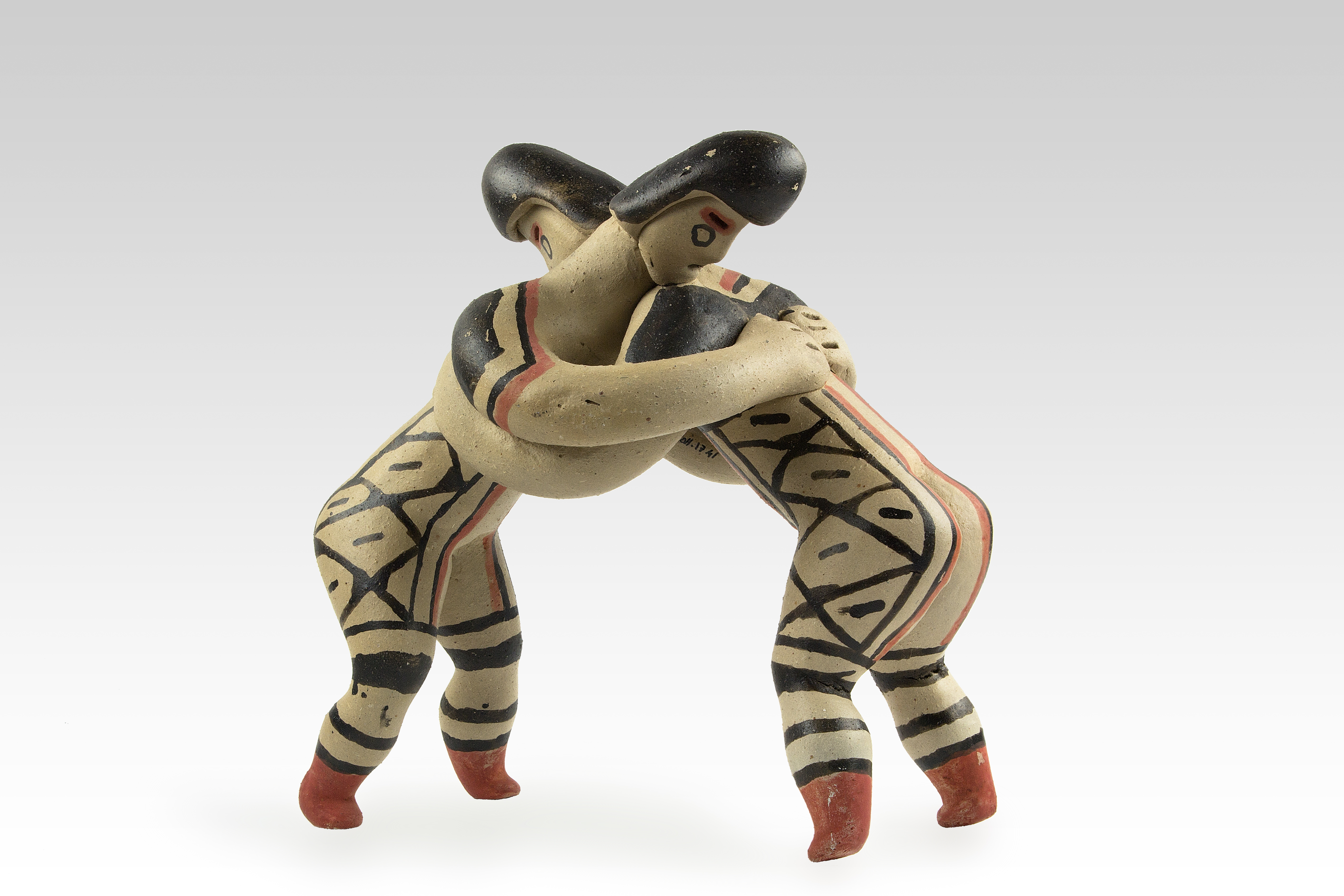
Karajá ceramic statuette, wrestlers

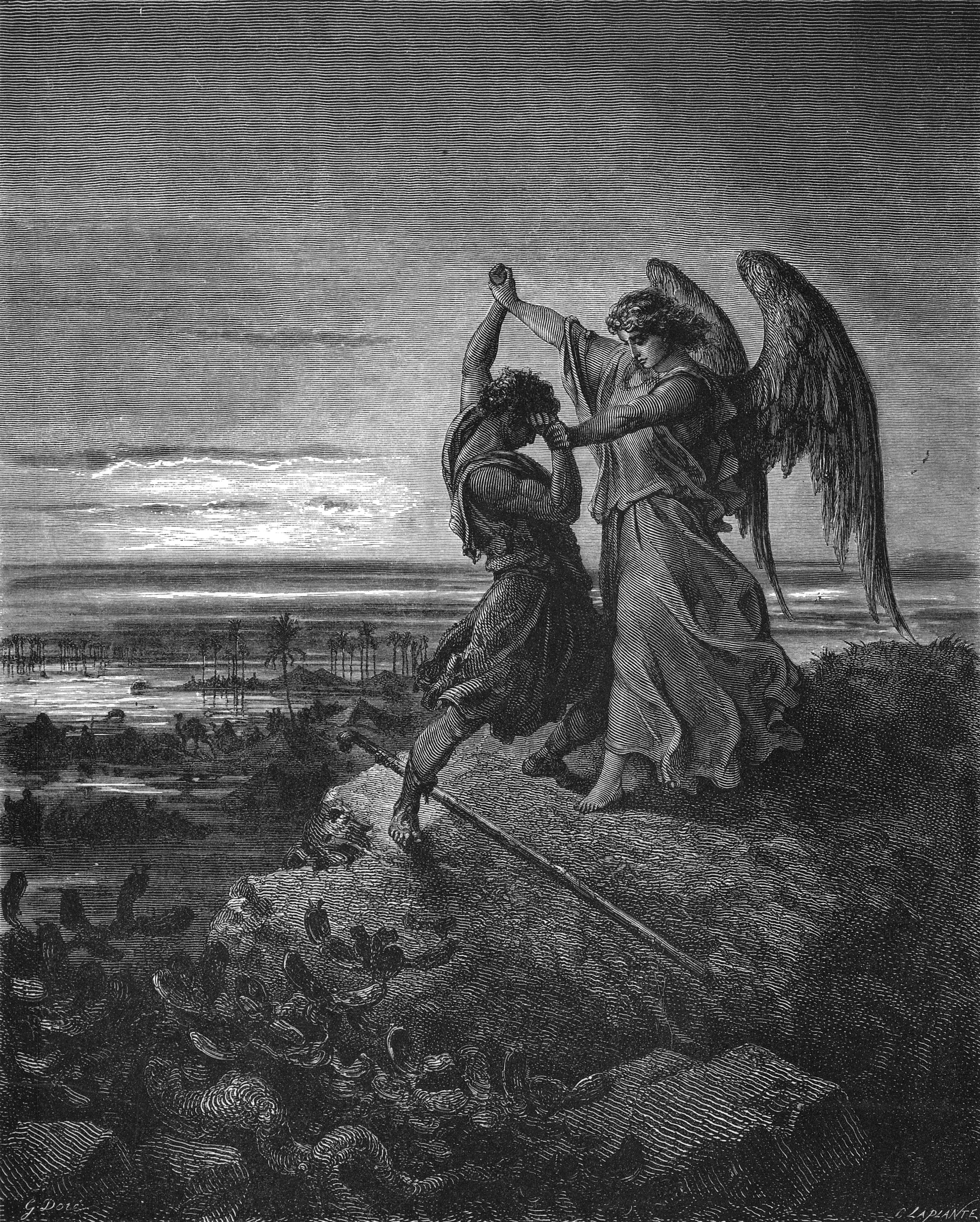
Jacob Wrestling with the Angel illustration by Gustave Doré, 1855

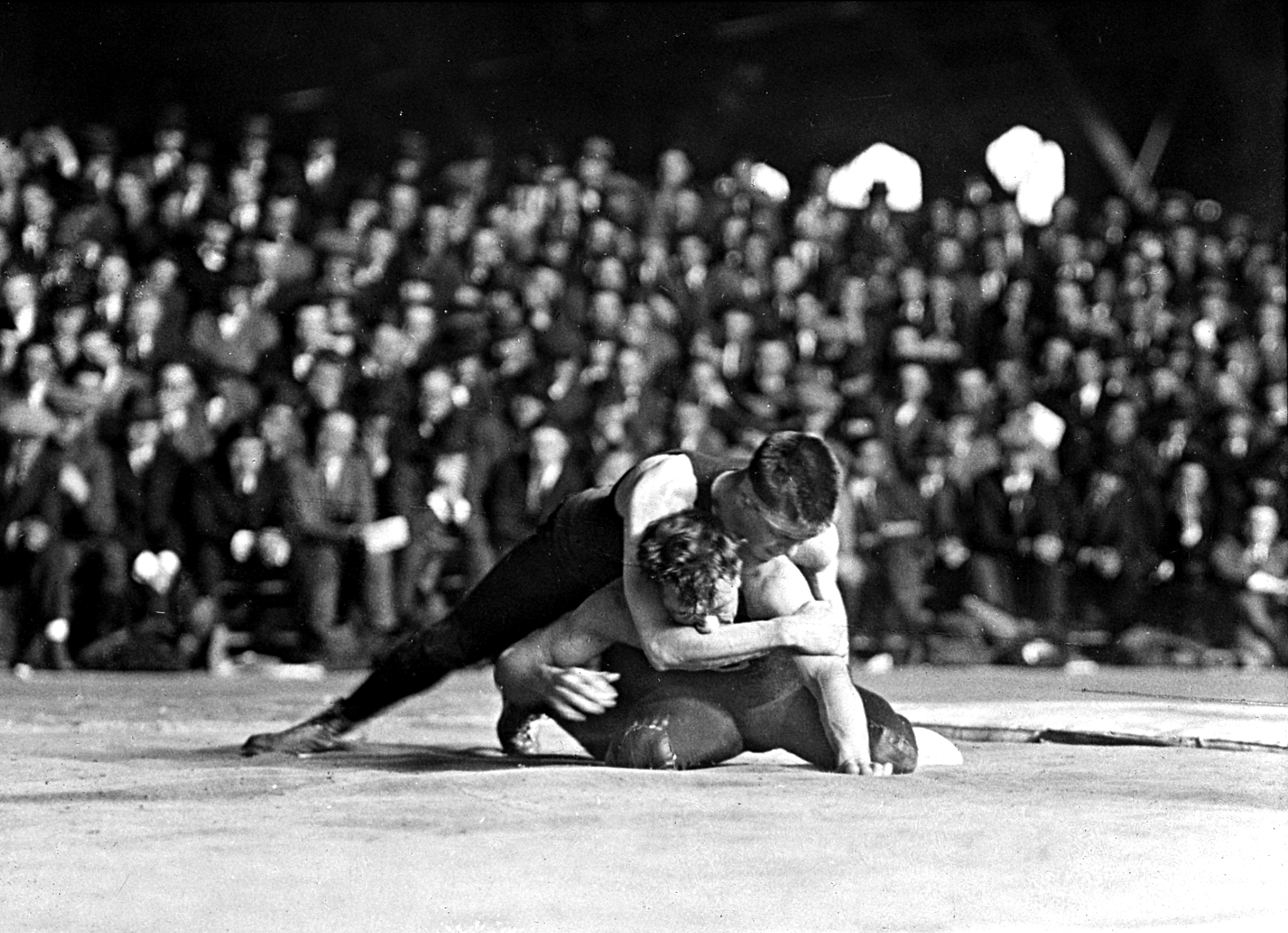
Cornell wrestling meet in New York State Drill Hall, 1923

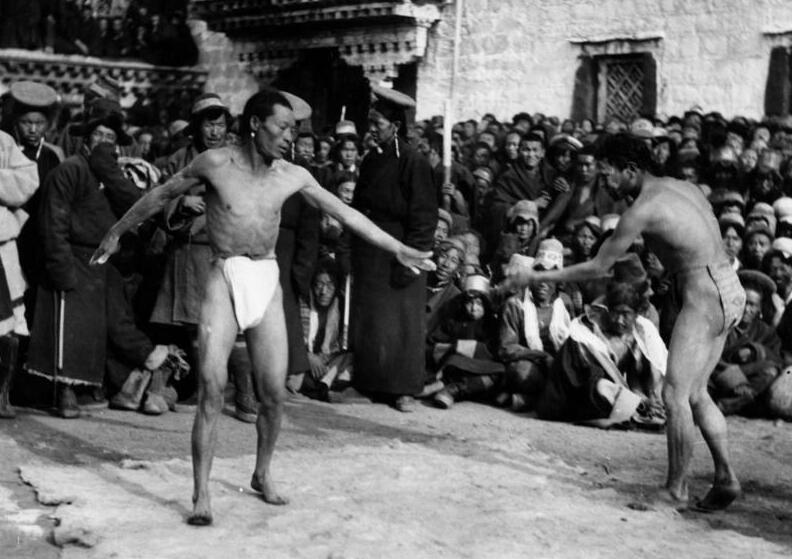
Tibetan wrestlers, 1938

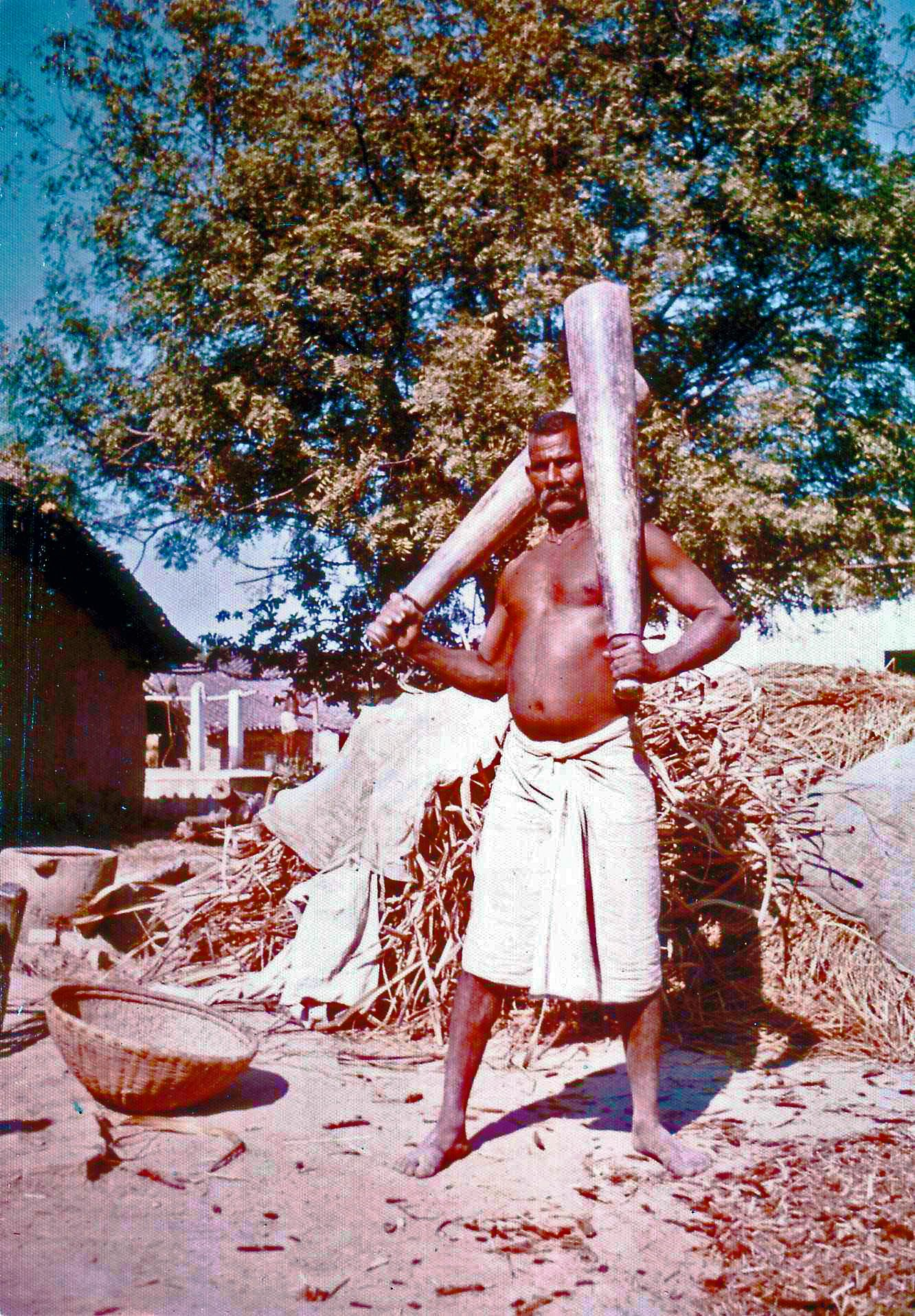
Indian wrestler exercising near Varanasi, 1973

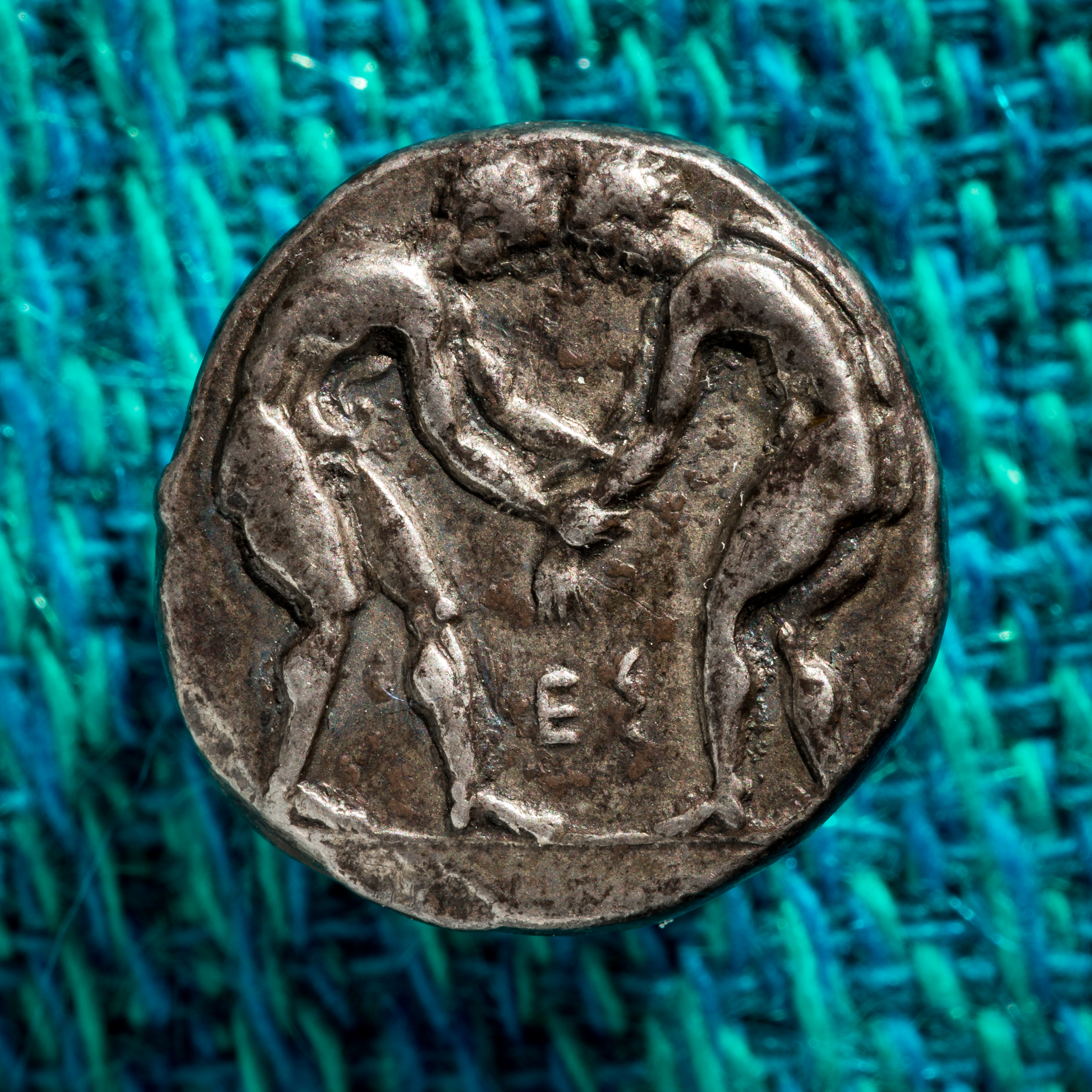
Wrestlers on Greek coin, 400–300 BC

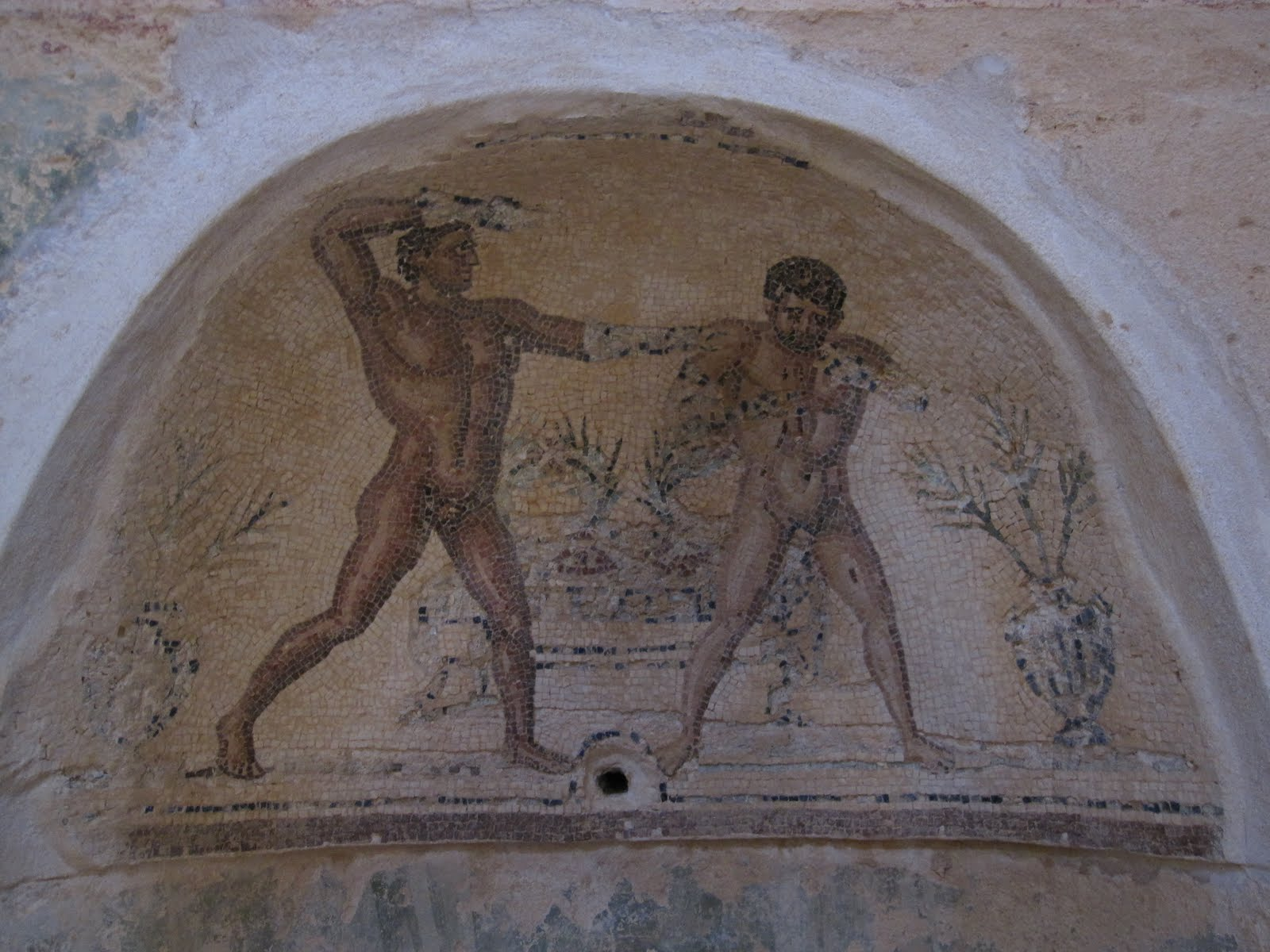
Ancient Libyan mosaic of wrestling

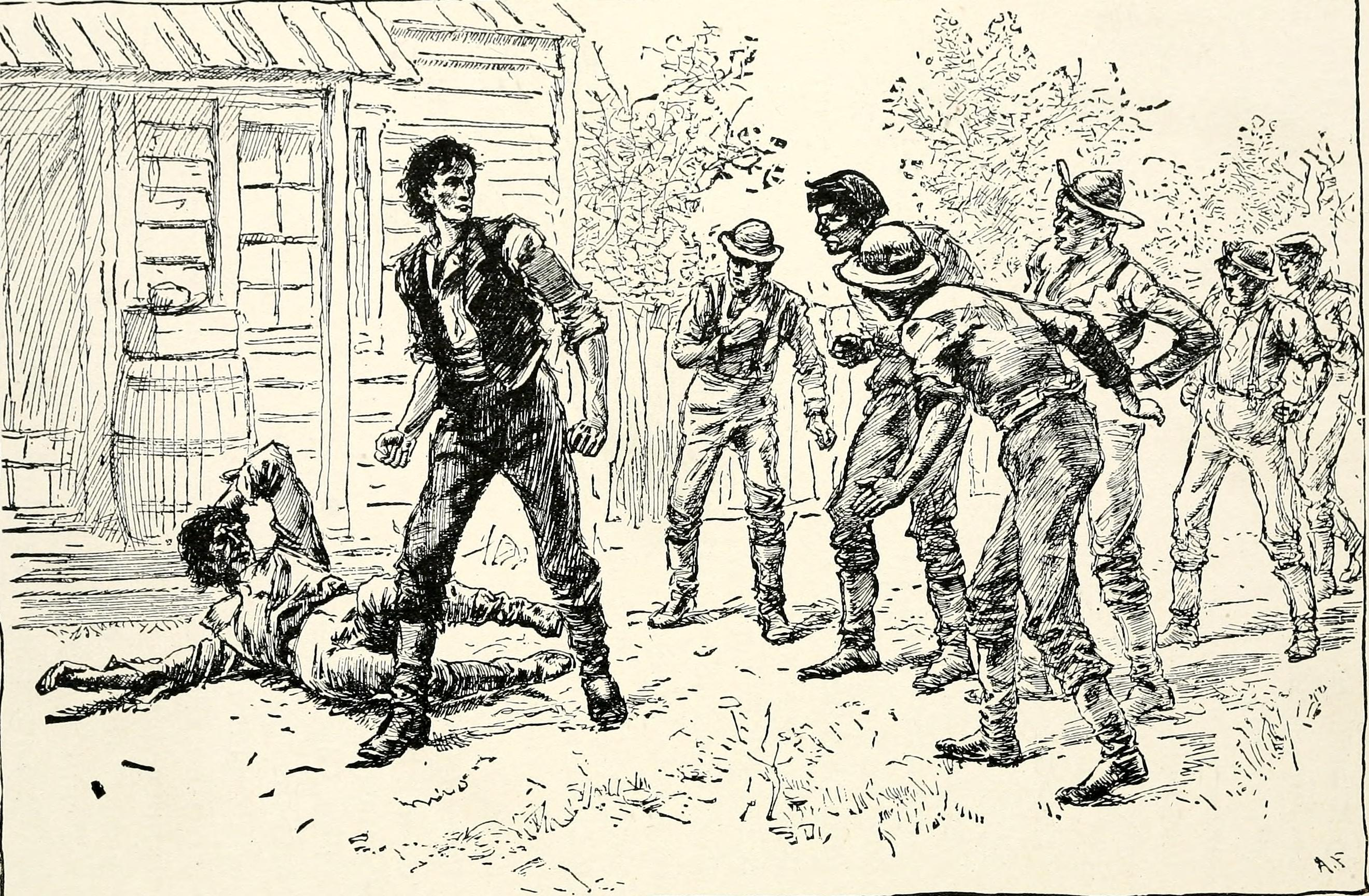
A 1904 illustration of Abraham Lincoln wrestling

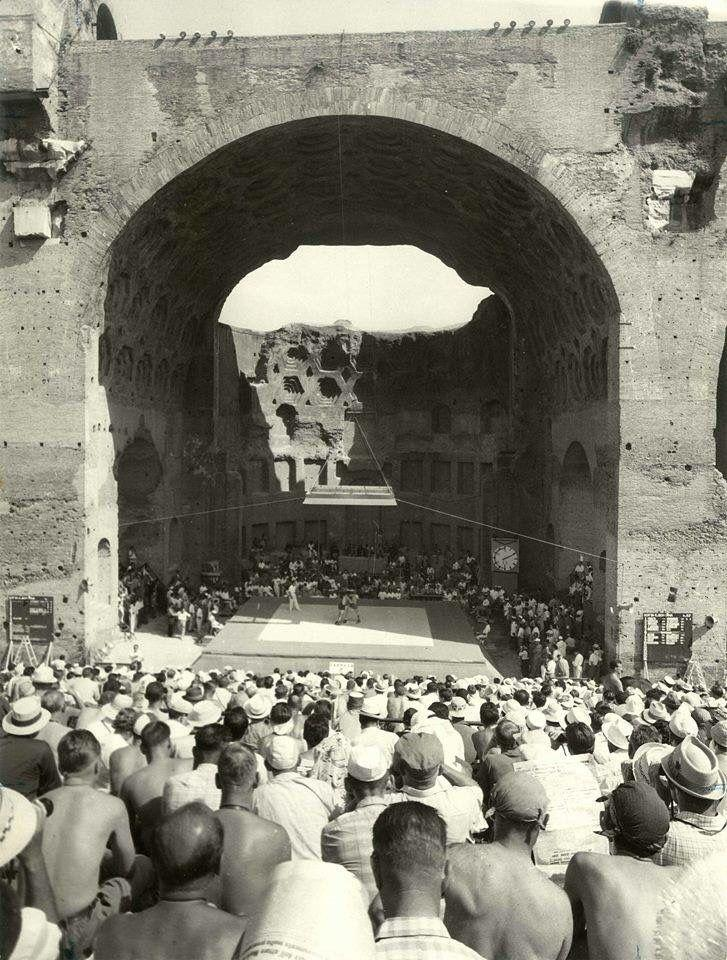
Wrestling match during 1960 Summer Olympics

== Modern international disciplines ==
Wrestling disciplines, as defined by UWW, are broken down into two categories: international wrestling disciplines and folk wrestling disciplines. Three are Olympic disciplines: Greco-Roman wrestling, men's freestyle wrestling and women's freestyle wrestling. UWW also sanctions associated styles: grappling, amateur pankration, belt wrestling alysh, pahlavani wrestling, beach wrestling, and African wrestling. Sambo was given status as an international style in 1966 by FILA, UWW's predecessor.

=== Greco-Roman wrestling ===
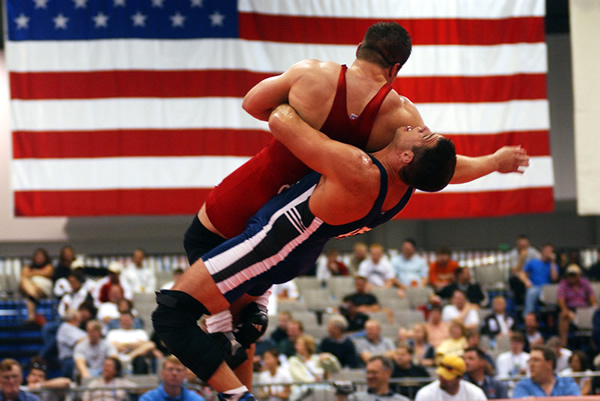
Greco-Roman wrestling match

Greco-Roman (GR) is an international discipline and one of two wrestling disciplines featured in the Olympic Games. This form of wrestling prioritizes upper body attacks, with an emphasis on explosive "high amplitude" throws. Under the Greco-Roman ruleset, it is forbidden to attack the opponent below the belt in the execution of any action (restricting holds, trips, and active but not passive usage of the legs). Points are allotted on the basis of throw amplitude, exposure of an opponent's back to the mat and opponent passivity. A Greco-Roman wrestler may instantly win a match by holding both of an opponent's scapula to the mat (known as a "fall"). A well known Greco-Roman wrestler is Alexander Karelin from Russia.

=== Freestyle wrestling ===
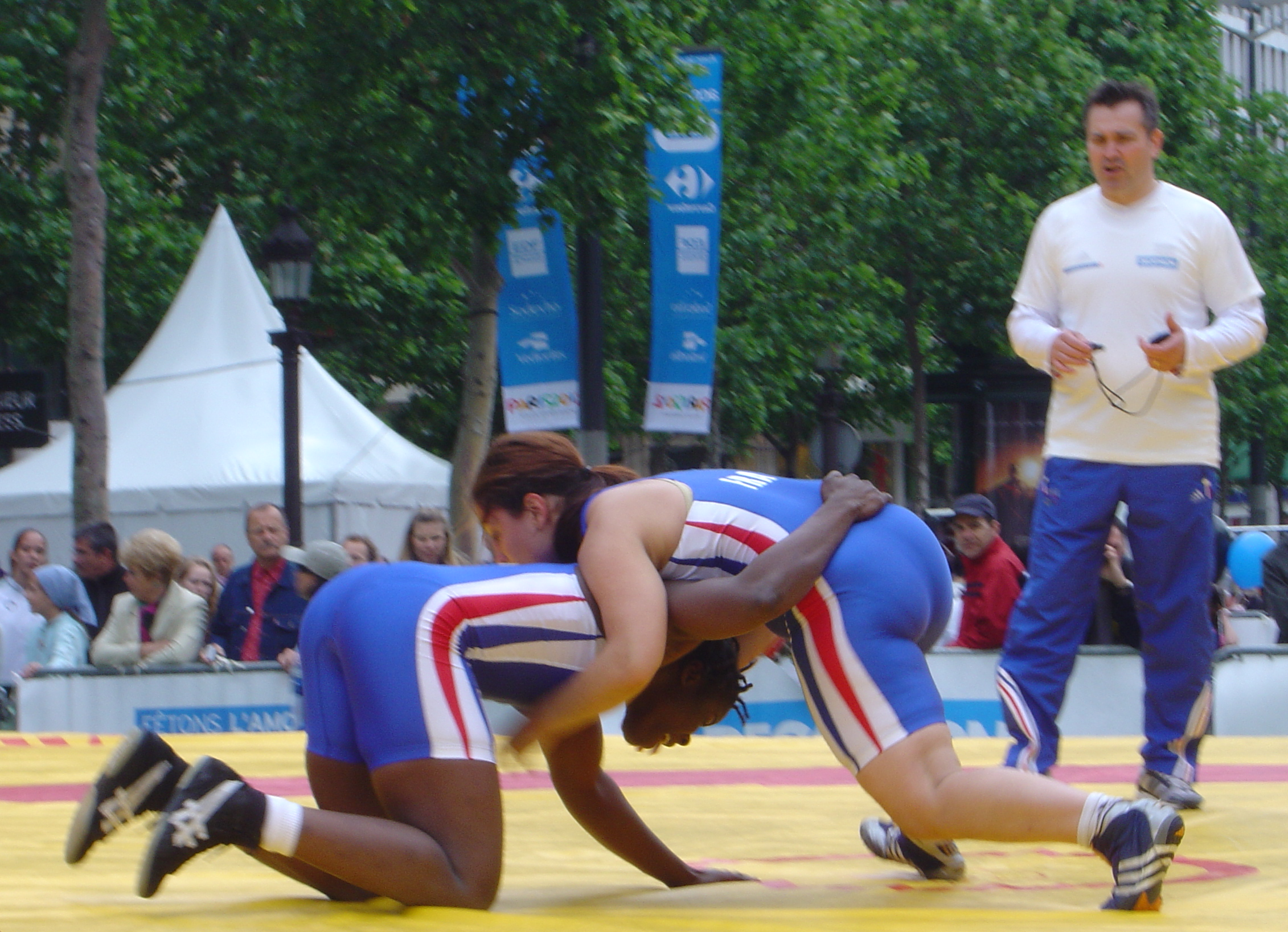
Women's freestyle wrestling

Freestyle wrestling (FS, WW) is an international discipline and one of two wrestling disciplines featured in the Olympic Games, for both men and women. This style allows the use of the wrestler's or his opponent's legs in offense and defense. Freestyle wrestling has its origins in catch-as-catch-can wrestling and awards points on the basis of throw amplitude, exposure of an opponent's back to the mat and opponent passivity. A freestyle wrestler may instantly win a match by holding both of an opponent's scapula to the mat (known as a "fall"). This form of wrestling is similar to American scholastic and collegiate wrestling with freestyle wrestling having a greater emphasis on throw amplitude. Collegiate women's wrestling uses two rulesets, freestyle in the NCAA and standard collegiate in the NCWA.

=== Submission wrestling ===
Submission Wrestling incorporates techniques and holds from a variety of wrestling disciplines. Grappling is divided into two styles: no-gi and gi. In no-gi (GNG), athletes wear shorts and a compression shirt called a rashguard. In gi grappling (GWG), athletes wear a kimono or gi. The goal of the sport is to take down and control the opponent on the ground and potentially win a submission using chokes and joint locks.

=== Amateur pankration ===
Pankration (PK), from the Greek words pan and kratos and meaning "all of power", is a world heritage martial art which was introduced to the Ancient Olympic Games in 648 BC. Modern amateur pankration is a form of mixed martial arts (MMA) that incorporates techniques from multiple systems. Matches are fought with both grappling and striking techniques.

=== Alysh belt wrestling ===
Alysh is a Turkic term for a Central Asian folk wrestling style which involves the wearing of jackets, trousers and thick belts. Throughout the contest the wrestlers must retain their hold on each other's belt. For this reason it is also referred to as 'belt wrestling alysh' or 'alysh belt wrestling' (BWUWW).

=== Pahlavani wrestling ===
The origin of pahlavani wrestling goes back to ancient Persia and is said to have been practiced by mythological Iranian heroes. It combines martial arts, calisthenics, strength training, and music, and was originally used to train warriors.. It is recognized by UNESCO as among the world's longest-running forms of sport. The best wrestlers earn the title of pahlevan (hero). It is similar to freestyle wrestling, however wrestlers wear pants which extend from the waist to below the knees and a belt. They are allowed to use or grab pants or belt as a grip, use legs, waist, clinch, leg trips and lift or throw, with the goal being to touch their opponent's shoulders to the mat.

=== Beach wrestling ===
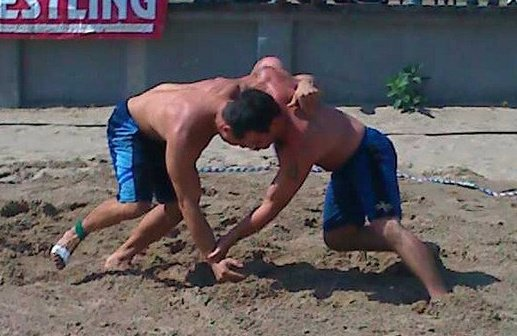
2010 USA Wrestling Beach Wrestling World Team Trials

UWW, then known as FILA, codified the form of beach wrestling in 2004. Beach wrestling (BW) is standing wrestling done by wrestlers, male or female, inside a sand-filled circle measuring 7 meters (23 ft) in diameter. The style originally mirrored the rules used before the use of wrestling mats, and beach wrestling has been regarded as the oldest version of international competitive wrestling. The wrestlers wear swimsuits rather than special wrestling uniforms. Wrestlers may also wear spandex or athletic shorts.

The international rules have been modified in 2015 by UWW, with the current rules allowing wrestlers to score points via takedowns, pushing their opponent out of bounds, or bringing the opponent down to their back. In addition to the annual World Beach Wrestling Championships, beach wrestling has been contested at Youth Olympic Games, Asian Games, Down Under Games, Mediterranean Games and at the 2019 World Beach Games.

== Folk styles ==
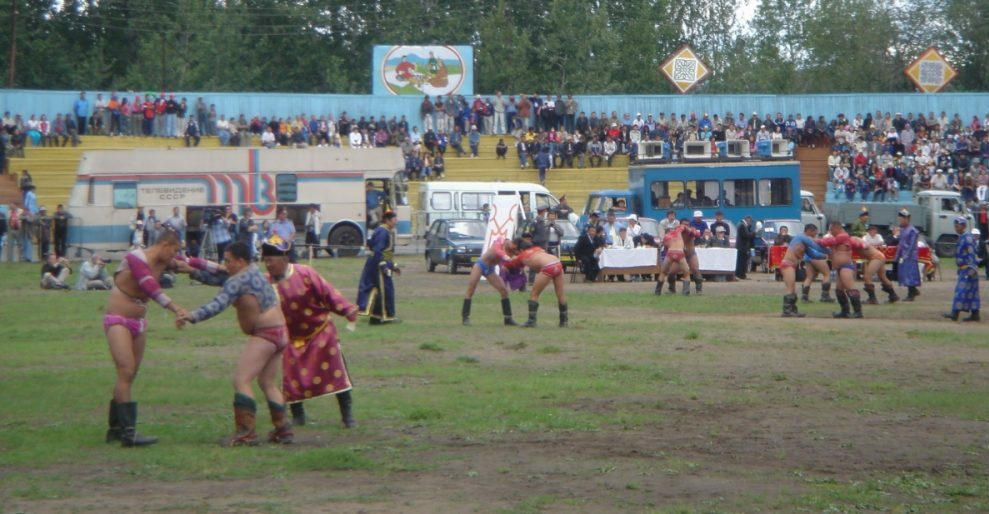
Khuresh (Tuvan wrestling)

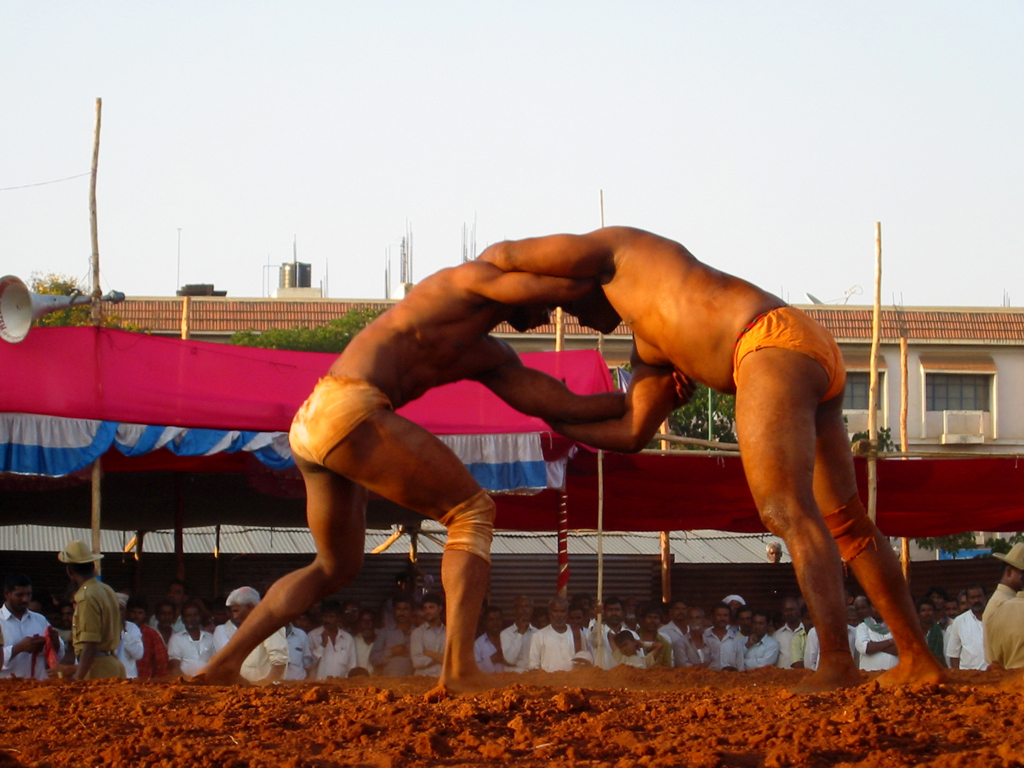
Indian wrestlers from Davangere in 2005

Folk wrestling describes a traditional form of wrestling unique to a culture or geographic region of the world that UWW does not administer rules for. Examples of the many styles of folk wrestling, include Cornish wrestling, backhold wrestling (from Europe), Cumberland Wrestling and Catch-as-catch-can (from England), kurash from Uzbekistan, gushteengiri from Tajikistan, khuresh from Siberia, Lotta Campidanese from Italy, naban from Myanmar, pehlwani from India, penjang gulat from Indonesia, schwingen from Switzerland, kokh from Armenia, tigel from Ethiopia, kene of the Nagas from India, shuai jiao from China, and ssireum from Korea.

Folk wrestling styles are not recognized as international styles of wrestling by UWW.

Celtic wrestling styles (e.g., Cornish wrestling, Scottish Backhold, Cumberland Wrestling, Gouren and Collar-and-elbow) are a subset of folk wrestling and have their own regulatory bodies and some are affiliated to other organisations. For example, the Cornish Wrestling Association is affiliated to the British Wrestling Association which is linked to the UWW. The International Federation of Celtic Wrestling (FILC) organises international competitions between wrestlers from these styles.

Folk styles have been international in nature. For example, there have been regular Cornish wrestling tournaments and matches in the US, Australia, South Africa, New Zealand, England and Cornwall, with irregular tournaments and matches in Japan, Canada and Mexico. There have also been Inter-Celtic tournaments between Cornwall and Brittany dating back to the Field of the Cloth of Gold in 1520 through to the modern era with regular events since 1928.

=== Oil wrestling ===
Oil wrestling (Turkish: yağlı güreş), also called grease wrestling, is the Turkish national sport. It is so called because the wrestlers douse themselves with olive oil. It is related to Uzbek kurash, Tuvan khuresh and Tatar and Bashkir көрәш (köräş). The wrestlers, known as pehlivanlar meaning "champion" wear a type of hand-stitched lederhosen called a kispetler, which are traditionally made of water buffalo hide, and most recently have been made of calfskin.

Unlike Olympic wrestling, oil wrestling matches may be won by achieving an effective hold of the kisbet. Thus, the pehlivan aims to control his opponent by putting his arm through the latter's kisbet. To win by this move is called paça kazık. Originally, matches had no set duration and could go on for one or two days, until one man was able to establish superiority, but in 1975 the duration was capped at 40 minutes for the başpehlivan and 30 minutes for the pehlivan category. If no winner is determined, another 15 minutes—10 minutes for the pehlivan category—of wrestling ensues, wherein scores are kept to determine the victor.

The annual Kırkpınar tournament, held in Edirne in Turkish Thrace since 1362, is the oldest continuously running, sanctioned sporting competition in the world. In recent years this style of wrestling has also become popular in other countries.

=== American collegiate wrestling ===
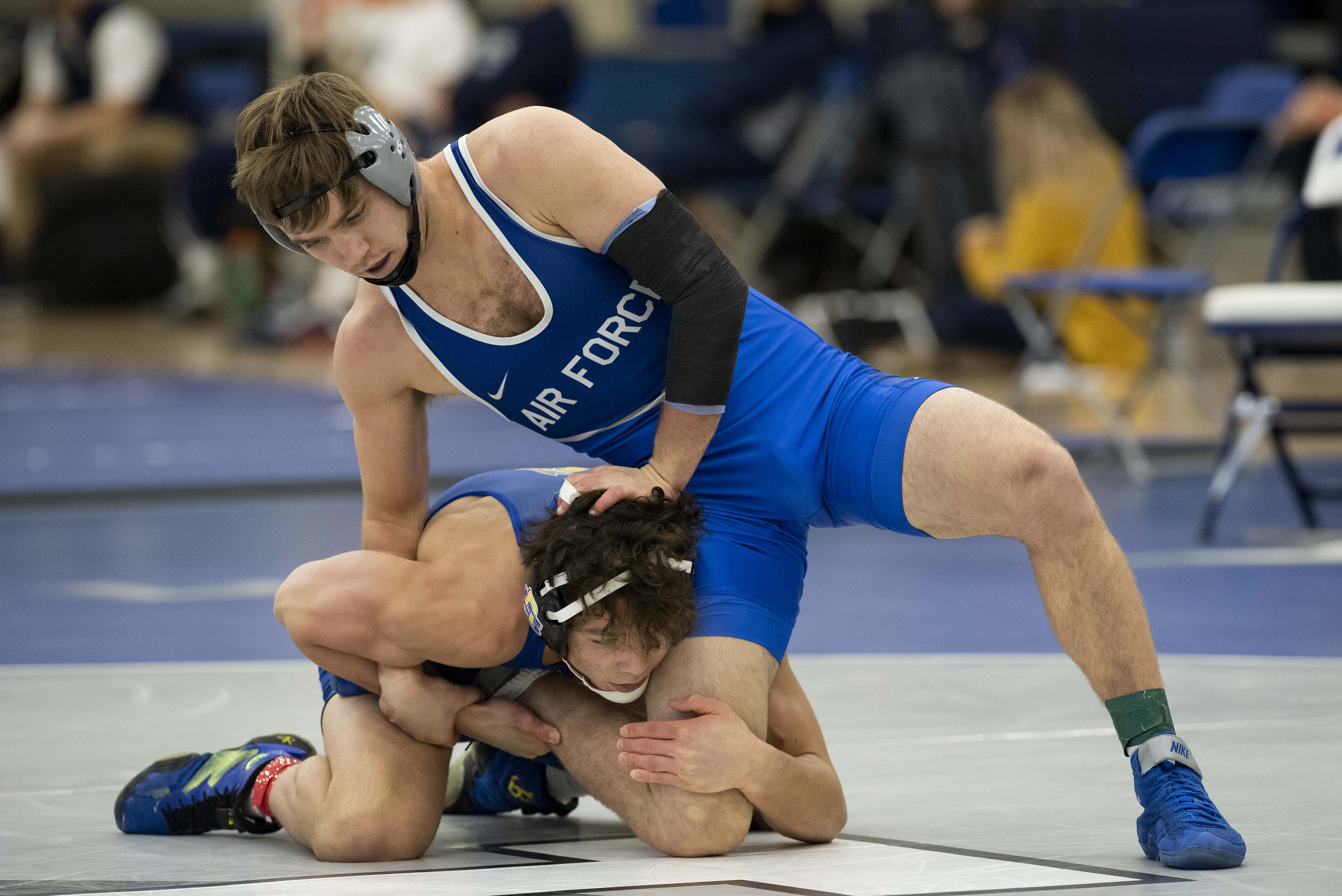
Two collegiate wrestlers competing in a dual meet

Collegiate wrestling (also known as folkstyle wrestling) is the commonly used name of wrestling practiced at the college and university level in the United States. This style, with modifications, is also practiced at the high school and middle school levels, and also for younger participants. The term is used to distinguish the style from other wrestling styles used in other parts of the world, and from the styles contested at the Olympic Games: Greco-Roman wrestling and freestyle wrestling.

Some high schools in the U.S. have developed junior varsity and freshman teams alongside varsity teams. Junior varsity and freshman wrestling teams restrict competitors not only by weight, but also by age and the amount of wrestling a competitor can partake in. For example, some junior varsity and freshman competitors are not allowed in tournament competition due to the amount of mat time a wrestler would accrue in a short time period.

Women's college wrestling in the U.S. uses freestyle wrestling rules in the NCAA and standard collegiate rules in the NCWA.

There are several organizations which oversee collegiate wrestling competition: NCAA Divisions I, II, and III, the NAIA, the NJCAA, the CCCAA, and the NCWA. NCAA Division I wrestling is considered the most prestigious and highest level of collegiate competition. A school chooses which athletic organization to join, although it may compete against teams from other levels and organizations during regular-season competition. The collegiate season starts in October or November and culminates with the National Championship tournament held in March.

NCAA Divisions I and II, the NAIA, and the NJCAA, offer wrestling scholarships for student athletes.

== Professional wrestling styles ==
Professional wrestling is often concluded in a raised ring; akin to boxing. Although advertised as contests, bouts are actually exhibitions with winners generally pre-determined to increase entertainment value. Legitimate wrestling skill remained a valuable bargaining chip in the wrestling industry until the late 20th century however, with occasional shoot matches (often to settle some backstage personal or business dispute) taking place in the early days of the business and still occurring well into the 1930s and 1940s and the threat to use legitimate skill to have one's way in the ring still potent decades later.

The roots of professional wrestling lay in the catch-as-catch-can contests of the late 19th century. Whereas the Europeans favored the more controlled and classical Greco-Roman style, the Americans from the 1880s preferred the more wide-open style of wrestling that later became known as freestyle. When the best American catch wrestlers discovered they could earn money with their skills, the professional counterpart was born. Initially, the contests were similar to amateur matches, except there were no time limits, and submission and choke holds were allowed. Amateur wrestling coexisted with its professional counterpart until around the 1940s before the sport grew more theatrical. Wrestlers from the period were known as hookers or shooters due to their legitimate skills – a dwindling number have remained in the business until modern times. Popular wrestlers from this era include Martin "Farmer" Burns, Frank Gotch, Tom Jenkins, Charles Cutler, Joe Stecher, Earl Caddock, Stanislaus Zbyszko, Ed "Strangler" Lewis, Ad Santel, John Pesek, Jim Londos, Ray Steele, Dick Shikat, and transitional figure Lou Thesz.

=== Sports entertainment ===
Sports entertainment, sometimes referred as "American-style" professional wrestling, includes companies such as WWE, AEW, TNA Wrestling and ROH who run touring professional wrestling events in the United States and throughout the world. Sports entertainment matches are highly theatrical, with dramatic stories such as feuds between the athletes developed and performed as part of build-up and promotion for matches. Before its increase in popularity in the mid-1980s, professional wrestling in the United States was organised as a cartel of regional monopolies, known as "territories." Wrestling in some of these areas (particularly the Southern and Midwestern United States) was performed in a relatively less theatrical more serious style, which could vary from realistically sporting to darkly violent, depending on local preference.

=== British/European wrestling ===
A different style of professional wrestling evolved in the United Kingdom and spread across Western Europe (where it was known as "Catch" in the non-English speaking countries of mainland Europe). Traditionally in this style, there was less use of storylines and angles to promote the matches which, for the most part, had the atmosphere of real wrestling competition. In many countries this form of professional wrestling achieved mainstream popularity – particularly in the United Kingdom and France where in both countries from the 1950s to the late 1980s, national television coverage made household names of its stars (it was also regularly screened on Welsh language television in Wales in the 1980s/1990s and early satellite sports channels during the same period as well as extensive home video releases in 1980s Germany/Austria) – but later declined and was supplanted both on television and in wider culture by imported American wrestling. Some promoters in the UK (and to a lesser extent France and Germany) still produce live shows in this style but face stiff competition from more American-styled rivals.

=== Puroresu ===
Japanese professional wrestling, also known as puroresu, is also treated more as a sport than the entertainment style of wrestling common in North America. As with British/European wrestling, there are fewer and less contrived storylines and angles and there is a similar atmosphere of realistic sporting competition. Much of this direction can be attributed to the influence of two European catch wrestlers/coaches Karl Gotch and Billy Robinson whose matches in Japan early in the 1970s inspired considerable interest in the more purist grappling element of professional wrestling. Popular Japanese wrestlers include Rikidozan, Giant Baba, Antonio Inoki, Mitsuharu Misawa, Kenta Kobashi, Shinya Hashimoto and Keiji Mutoh. Shoot style wrestling evolved from traditional puroresu in an attempt to create a combat-based style. Shoot style featured a mix of amateur and catch wrestling, kickboxing and submission grappling. Shoot style wrestling is retrospectively considered a precursor to mixed martial arts.

=== Lucha libre ===
Mexican professional wrestling, also known as lucha libre, is a style of wrestling using special holds (llaves) and aerial techniques. Most performers, known as luchadores (singular luchador), begin their careers wearing masks, but most will lose their masks during their careers. Traditionally a match involves the best of three rounds, with no time limit. Each luchador uses his own special wrestling style or estilo de lucha consisting of aerial attack moves, strikes and complex submission holds. Popular luchadores in Mexico have included El Santo, Blue Demon, Mil Máscaras, Perro Aguayo, Konnan, L. A. Park and Místico. Several wrestlers who performed in Mexico also had success in the United States, including Eddie Guerrero, Rey Mysterio and Alberto Del Rio.

=== Circus wrestling ===
In France in the 19th century, early professional wrestling shows in the Greco-Roman style were often performed at the circus by the resident strongmen. This style later spread to circuses in Eastern Europe, particularly in Russia where it was a staple part of circuses in the Soviet era, where it was often advertised as "French wrestling." Ivan Poddubny achieved major stardom in his homeland and beyond during the interwar period.

== Other styles ==
=== Judo ===
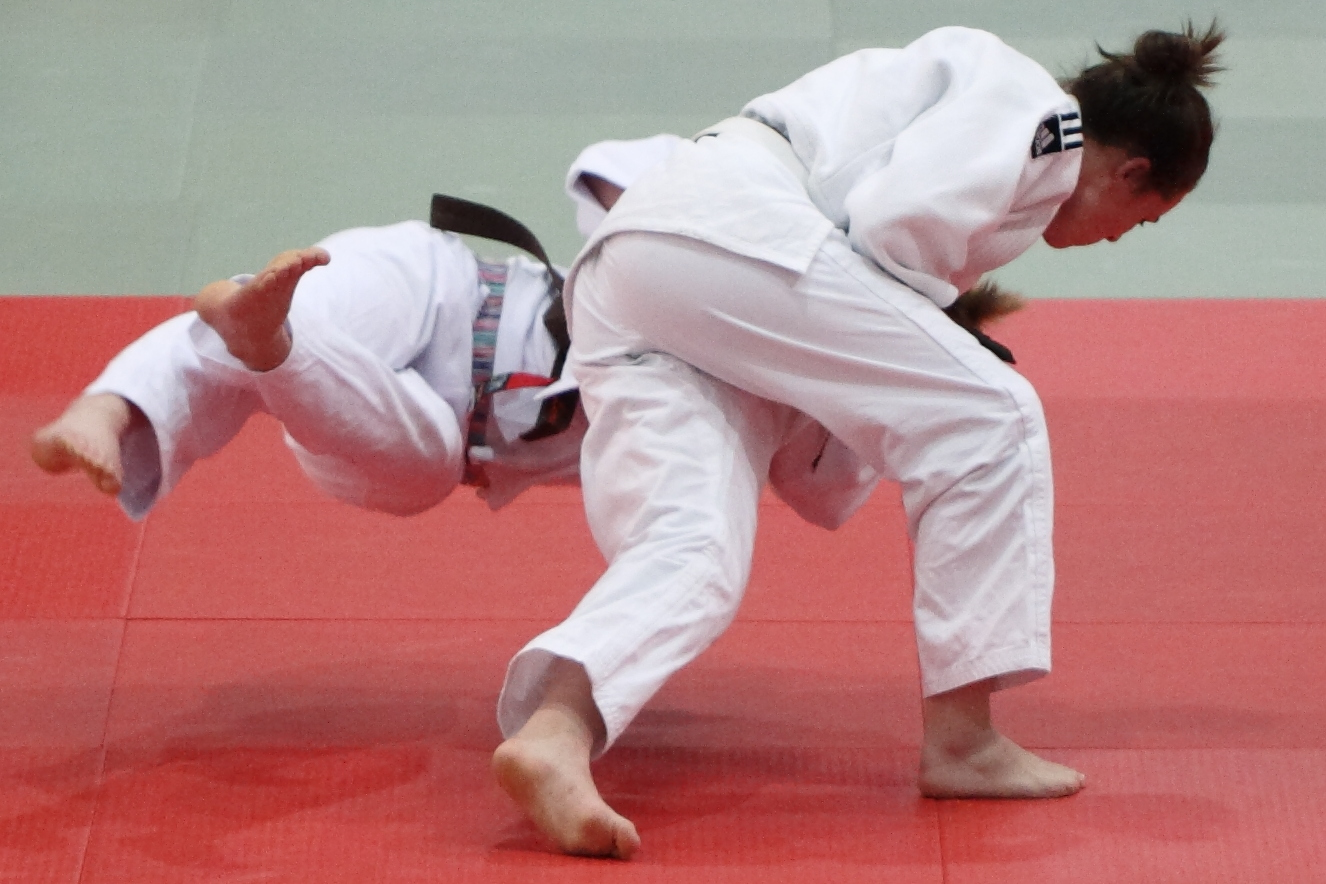
A Judo throw

Judo is a style of wrestling which is derived from jujitsu, a Japanese martial art. As a wrestling style, judo is distinctive in that practitioners, called judoka, wear a heavy jacket and trousers, called a gi, along with a belt. The gi is used to grip the opponent in order to throw or choke them. Judo also allows some chokes and joint locks, although they are typically banned for children. Judo is a popular sport in Japan as well as in France, Russia, and eastern Europe.

=== Sambo ===
Sambo is a martial art that originated in the Soviet Union (specifically Russia) in the 20th century. It is an acronym for "self-defence without weapons" in Russian and had its origins in the Soviet armed forces. Its influences are varied, with techniques borrowed from sports ranging from the two international wrestling styles of Greco-Roman and freestyle to judo, jujitsu, European styles of folk wrestling, and even fencing. The rules for sport sambo are similar to those in competitive judo, with a variety of leg locks and defense holds from the various national wrestling styles in the Soviet Union, while not allowing chokeholds.

== Wrestling in mixed martial arts ==
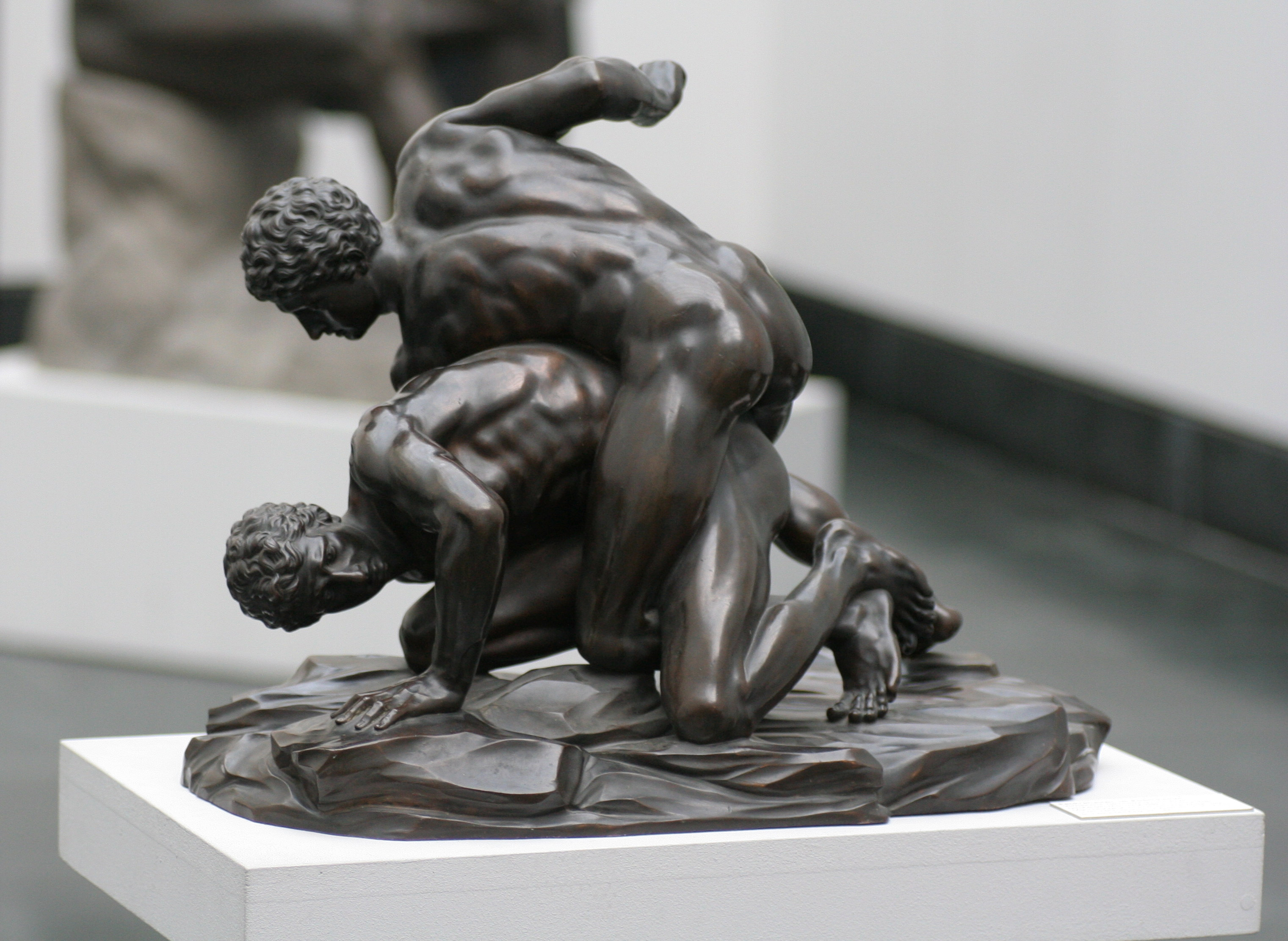
Pankration, an ancient Greek martial art resembling MMA, and wrestling were two of the most popular sports at the ancient Olympics

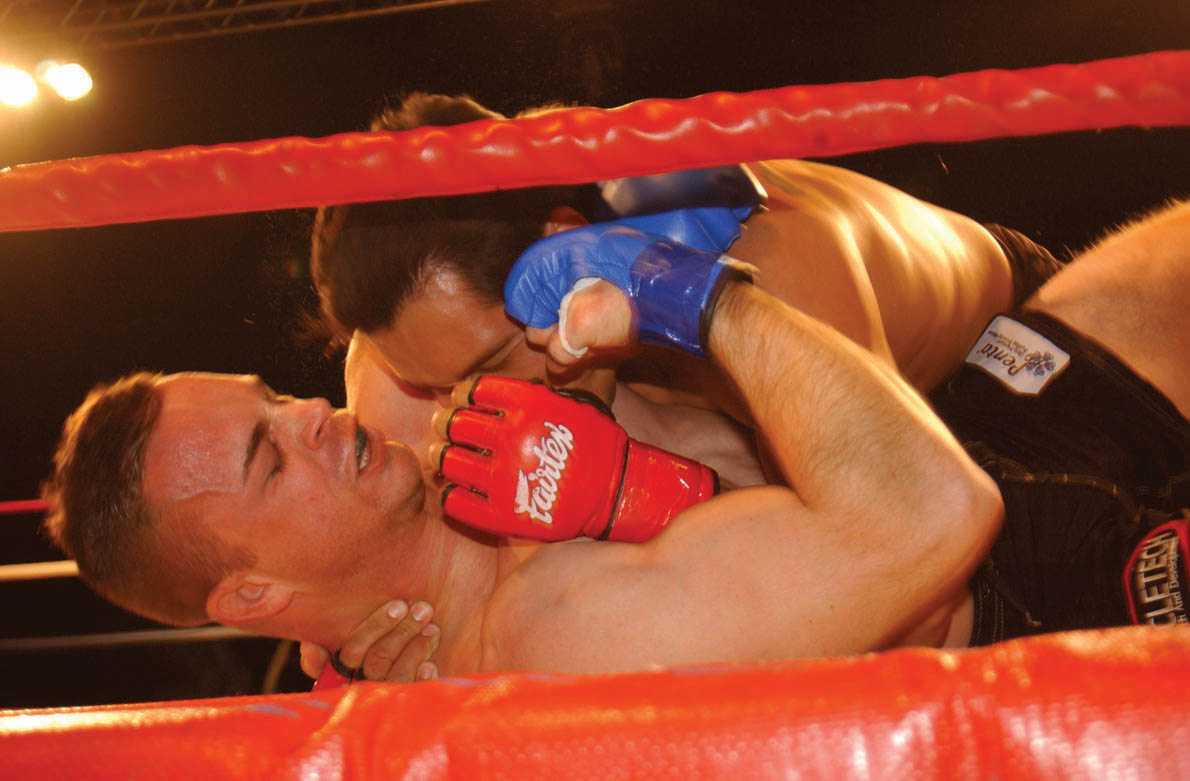
Two MMA fighters grappling in a mixed martial arts event

I personally think that the very best skill for MMA is wrestling, I think that's the number one base to come from because those guys just flat out dictate where the fight takes place [standing or on the ground]." "There is no better base for entering into mixed martial arts than the highly successful competitor as a wrestler. The competitive wrestlers, the highly successful amateur wrestlers have such tremendous mental toughness. If you can just get through the room, the wrestling room practices at like really high level universities, NCAA division one teams; those guys are savages. The stuff they go through, just the overtraining, just the mental toughness that you have to develop.

— Joe Rogan

The rapid rise in the popularity of mixed martial arts (MMA) has increased interest in wrestling due to its effectiveness against other martial arts since the infancy of MMA, and several wrestling techniques have been specifically adapted for MMA, leading to many martial arts gyms holding MMA wrestling classes. It is considered one of the primary disciplines in MMA along with Brazilian jiu-jitsu, boxing, kickboxing/muay Thai, and judo.

Shoot wrestling, a relative of catch and freestyle wrestling, is the foundation of Shooto, a combat sport and pioneer MMA organization founded in 1985. Pancrase, another influential MMA organization based on shoot wrestling, also predates the Ultimate Fighting Championship (UFC).

Wrestling has produced significantly more UFC champions than any other martial art. Wrestlers such as Dan Severn, Don Frye, Mark Coleman, Randy Couture, Mark Kerr, Kazushi Sakuraba, Pat Miletich, and Dan Henderson won many of the early UFC tournaments along with other accolades. Ken Shamrock won the first UFC Superfight Championship and the first King of Pancrase Openweight Championship in Japan. Other notable MMA fighters with foundations in various forms of wrestling include:

Matt Hughes	UFC Welterweight Champion –– two-time NCAA Division I Wrestling and NJCAA All-American
Jon Jones	UFC Light Heavyweight and Heavyweight Champion –– NJCAA Wrestling Champion
Minoru Suzuki	Pancrase co-founder, Pancrase Openweight Champion –– catch wrestling background
Masakatsu Funaki	Pancrase co-founder, Pancrase Openweight Champion –– catch wrestling background
Frank Shamrock	First UFC Light Heavyweight and Strikeforce Middleweight Champion, WEC Light Heavyweight Champion –– catch wrestling background
Kevin Randleman	UFC Heavyweight Champion –– two-time NCAA Division I Wrestling Champion
Tito Ortiz	UFC Light Heavyweight Champion –– two-time CCCAA Wrestling All-American
Jens Pulver	First UFC Lightweight Champion –– NJCAA Wrestling All-American
Takanori Gomi	Shooto and PRIDE Lightweight Champion –– All-Japan Combat Wrestling Champion
Josh Barnett	UFC Heavyweight Champion and Pancrase Openweight Champion –– Catch Wrestling World Champion
Jake Shields	Shooto and EliteXC Welterweight Champion, Strikeforce Middleweight Champion –– two-time CCCAA Wrestling All-American
Norifumi "KID" Yamamoto	All-Japan Emperor's Cup runner-up, Hero's Middleweight Grand Prix Champion –– AIA Wrestling Champion
Georges St-Pierre	UFC Welterweight and Middleweight Champion –– trained at Reinitz Wrestling Center's Montreal Wrestling Club
Brock Lesnar	UFC Heavyweight Champion –– NCAA Division I Wrestling Champion
Chuck Liddell	UFC Light Heavyweight Champion –– NCAA Division I Wrestler
Rashad Evans	UFC Light Heavyweight Champion and The Ultimate Fighter 2 Heavyweight Champion –– NCAA Division I Wrestling National Qualifier
Dave Menne	UFC Middleweight Champion –– NCAA Division I Wrestler
Renato Sobral	Strikeforce Light Heavyweight Champion and Luta Livre black belt –– Brazilian National Wrestling Champion
Eddie Alvarez	Bellator and UFC Lightweight Champion –– Scholastic wrestler
Benson Henderson	WEC and UFC Lightweight Champion –– two-time NAIA Wrestling All-American
Cain Velasquez	UFC Heavyweight Champion –– two-time NCAA Division I Wrestling All-American and NJCAA Champion
Miesha Tate	Strikeforce and UFC Women's Bantamweight Champion –– FILA Grappling world silver medalist
Demetrious Johnson	UFC and ONE Flyweight Champion –– Scholastic wrestler
Carla Esparza	First Invicta and UFC Women's Strawweight Champion, won The Ultimate Fighter 20 –– two-time WCWA Wrestling All-American
Chris Weidman	UFC Middleweight Champion –– two-time NCAA Division I Wrestling All-American
Johny Hendricks	UFC Welterweight Champion –– two-time NCAA Division I Wrestling Champion
Daniel Cormier	UFC Light Heavyweight and Heavyweight Champion –– NCAA Division I Wrestling All-American, US National Freestyle Wrestling Champion and US Freestyle Olympian
Tyron Woodley	UFC Welterweight Champion –– two-time NCAA Division I Wrestling All-American
Ryan Bader	Bellator Light Heavyweight and Heavyweight Champion, won The Ultimate Fighter 8 –– two-time NCAA Division I Wrestling All-American
Tony Ferguson	Interim UFC Lightweight Champion and winner of The Ultimate Fighter 13 –– NCWA Wrestling Champion
Khabib Nurmagomedov	UFC Lightweight Champion, 29–0 in MMA career –– Master of Sport
Henry Cejudo	UFC Flyweight and Bantamweight Champion –– Olympic Freestyle Wrestling Gold Medalist
Kamaru Usman	UFC Welterweight Champion –– NCAA Division II Wrestling Champion
Arjan Bhullar	ONE Heavyweight Champion –– two-time NAIA Wrestling Champion, CIS Wrestling Champion and Commonwealth Games Freestyle Champion
Anatoly Malykhin	ONE Light Heavyweight and interim Heavyweight Champion –– Russian Nationals Wrestling Bronze Medalist
Aljamain Sterling	UFC Bantamweight Champion –– two-time NCAA Division III Wrestling All-American
Justin Gaethje	Interim UFC Lightweight Champion –– NCAA Division I Wrestling All-American
Alexander Volkanovski	UFC Featherweight Champion and former AFC Featherweight Champion –– Greco-Roman wrestling background
Colby Covington	Interim UFC Welterweight Champion –– NCAA Division I Wrestling All-American
Frankie Edgar	UFC Lightweight Champion –– NCAA Division I Wrestling National Qualifier

== See also ==
- Amateur wrestling
  - List of amateur wrestlers
  - List of World and Olympic Champions in men's freestyle wrestling
  - List of World and Olympic Champions in women's freestyle wrestling
  - List of World and Olympic Champions in Greco-Roman wrestling
- Aquathlon (underwater wrestling)
- Arm wrestling
- Catch wrestling
- Indian wrestling
- Grappling
- Malla-yuddha
- Mixed martial arts
- Pankration
- Professional wrestling
  - List of professional wrestlers
  - WrestleMania
- Skin infections and wrestling
- Sumo
- United World Wrestling (UWW)
- Wrestling at the Summer Olympics
- Wrestling in Canada
- Wrestling in Dagestan
