= Kabadeh keshi =

Kabadeh-keshi (In Persian language: کباده کشی), also known as kabadeh pulling, is one of the exercises practiced in Zurkhaneh, the traditional gymnasium of Iran. It involves lifting and maneuvering the kabadeh, a heavy iron training bow, in rhythm with drum beats and chants led by the Morshed (master or guide).

== Execution ==
In kabadeh-keshi, the athlete grips the iron arc of the kabadeh with the right hand and the chain with the left (or vice versa for left-handed individuals). The arms are slightly bent and held above the head. In sync with the rhythmic chanting and beats of the morshed, the athlete alternates movements:

- First, the right arm is extended laterally while the left arm bends over the head. - Then, the left arm is extended and the right arm bends over the head.

This alternating pattern continues as the athlete softly shifts their weight, standing on the balls of their feet and moving gently forward and backward, maintaining flow and balance throughout the performance.

== Rules ==
Not all athletes in the zurkhaneh perform kabadeh-keshi. Those who wish to participate must first seek rokhsat (permission) from the morshed or a senior athlete (Pishkesvat) after completing their spinning routine. Kabadehs are then picked up—usually in pairs or individually—and the exercise begins in unison with the performance space.

== See also ==
- Kabadeh
- Pahlevani and zoorkhaneh rituals
- Meel swinging
- Sang lifting

== Sources ==
- Farhangsara – Zurkhaneh History (Archived)
