= Pahlavani, Iran =

Pahlavani پهلواني
- Village
- Location within Iran
- Coordinates: 30°36′22″N 52°25′11″E
- Country: Iran
- Province: Fars
- County: Eqlid
- Bakhsh: Sedeh
- Rural District: Aspas

Population (2006)
  - Total: 456
- Time zone: UTC+3:30 (IRST)
  - Summer (DST): UTC+4:30 (IRDT)

Pahlavani (Persian: پهلواني, also Romanized as Pahlavānī and Pahlevānī) is a village in Aspas Rural District, Sedeh District, Eqlid County, Fars province, Iran.
