= Pahlevani and zoorkhaneh rituals =

Persian traditional system of athletics

Koshti Pahlewani
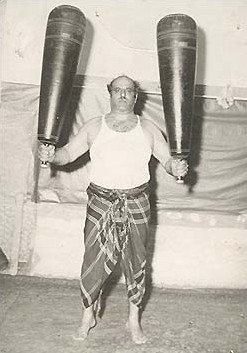
- The pahlevan Mustafa Tousi holding a pair of meels
- Also known as: Koŝtiye Pahlewāni
- Focus: Wrestling
- Country of origin: Iran/Persia
- Famous practitioners: Alireza Soleimani; Abbas Zandi
- Descendant arts: Pehlwani
- Official website: http://www.izsf.net/en/
- Meaning: Heroic wrestling

Pahlewani and Zurkhanei rituals
- UNESCO Intangible Cultural Heritage
- Country: Iran
- Reference: 00378
- Region: Asia and the Pacific

Inscription history
- Inscription: 2010 (4th session)
- List: Representative

Pehlevanliq culture: traditional zorkhana games, sports and wrestling
- UNESCO Intangible Cultural Heritage
- Country: Azerbaijan
- Reference: 01703
- Region: Europe and North America

Inscription history
- Inscription: 2022 (17th session)
- List: Representative

Pahlevani and Zoorkhaneh rituals (Pahlavani Sport / Zoorkhaneh Sport) is the name inscribed by UNESCO for Varzesh-e Pahlavāni (Persian: آیین پهلوانی و زورخانه‌ای 'heroic sport') or Varzesh-e Bāstāni (ورزش باستانی 'ancient sport'), a traditional system of athletics and a form of martial arts originally used to train warriors in Iran (Persia). Outside Iran, zoorkhanehs can now also be found in Azerbaijan, and Afghanistan, and were introduced into Iraq in the mid-19th century by the Iranian immigrants, where they seem to have existed until the 1980s before disappearing. It combines martial arts, calisthenics, strength training and music. It contains elements of pre-Islamic and post-Islamic culture of Iran (particularly Zoroastrianism and Gnosticism) with the spirituality of Persian Shia Islam and Sufism. Practiced in a domed structure called the zurkhāneh, training sessions consist mainly of ritual gymnastic movements and climax with the core of combat practice, a style of folk wrestling called koshti pahlavāni.

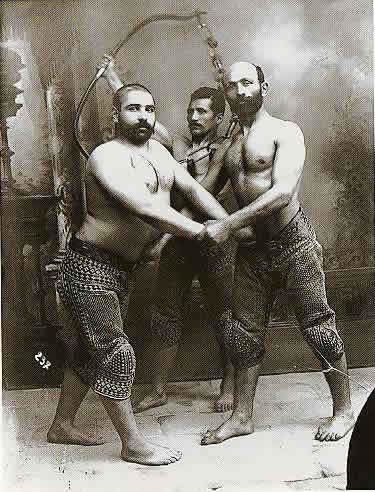
Studio Portrait of Three Persian Wrestlers by Antoin Sevruguin, c. 1890

== History ==
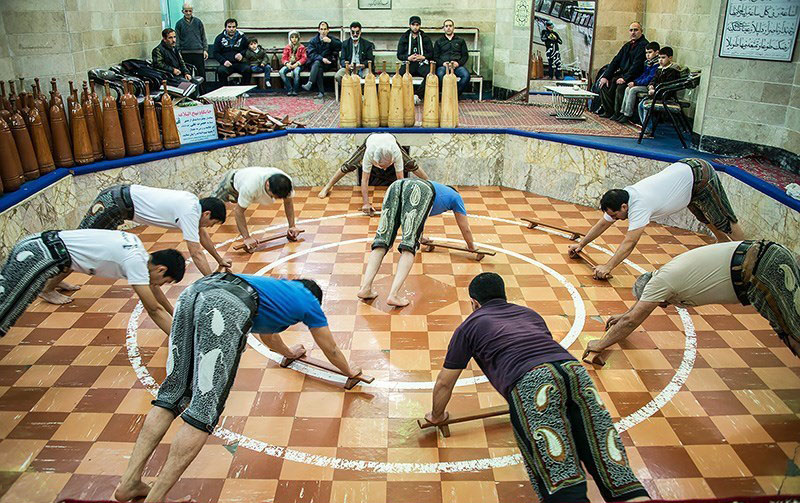
Training push-ups

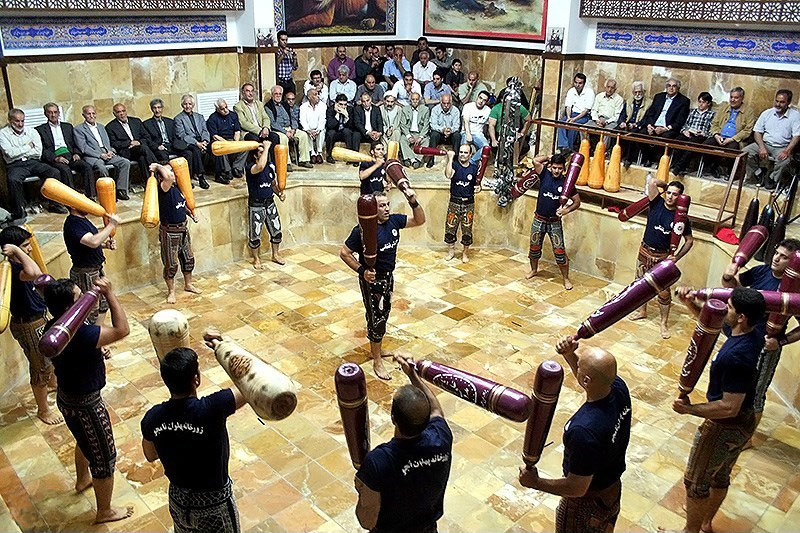
Pahlevan Namjoo Zurkhaneh in Azadi Street

Traditional Iranian wrestling (koshti) dates back to ancient Persia and was said to have been practiced by Rustam, Iranian hero of the Shahnameh epic. Grappling for combat was considered the particular specialty of the zourkhāneh. The original purpose of these institutions was to train men as warriors and instill them with a sense of national pride in anticipation for the coming battles. The zourkhaneh system of training is what is now known as varzesh-e bastani, and its particular form of wrestling was called koshti pahlevani, after the Parthian word pahlevan meaning hero.

Following the spread of Shia Islam, and particularly after the development of Sufism in the eighth century, varzesh-e pahlavani absorbed philosophical and spiritual components from it.

Varzesh-e bastani was particularly popular in the 19th century, during the reign of the Qajar king Nāser al-Din Shāh Qājār (1848–1896). Every 21 March on Nowruz (the Iranian new year), competitions would be held in the shah's court, and the shah himself would present the champion with an armlet (bazoo-band). The sport declined following the rise of the Pahlavi dynasty in the 1920s and the subsequent modernisation campaigns of Reza Shah, who saw the sport as a relic of Qajarite ritual. Reza Shah's son Mohammad Reza Pahlavi took a different approach, emphasizing Iran's ancient Persian roots as an alternative to the heavily Islam-based identity of less developed nations in the Middle East. He attempted to revive the tradition and practiced it himself, and during his reign, the last national competitions were held.

Following the Iranian Revolution of 1979 the tradition lost some of its popularity as the new regime discouraged anything tied to pre-Islamic paganism, which included the Gnostic chants and rituals of the zourkhāneh. This did not last, however, as the Islamic Republic eventually promoted varzesh-e bastani as a symbol of Iranian pride and culture.

The matter of attracting younger members has been a major discourse for some time. Suggestions have included making practice more upbeat and distributing duties among the younger members instead of adhering strictly to seniority. The IZSF was established in response to this and it is currently the world governing body for all zourkhāneh. In recent years, the sport appears to be gaining popularity in the countries adjacent to Iran, including Iraq and Afghanistan.

One of the Baku's Inner City's entertainment areas was the Zorkhana. Baku's Zorkhana located just a few steps from the Bukhari and Multani caravanserais, towards the Maiden's Tower dates back to at least the 15th century. There were contests accompanied by a trio of musicians who performed traditional Eastern instruments like the kamancha, zurna and naghara. Most of these melodies have long since been forgotten. However, one by the name of "Jangi" (War) is still performed prior to the opening of Azerbaijani national wrestling competitions (Gulash).

== The zurkhāneh ==
A Ramadan performance in Jamaran Zoorkhaneh of Tehran, 2013

The traditional gymnasium in which varzesh-e bastani is practiced is known as the zurkhaneh (Persian: زورخانه, also spelled zoorkhāneh and zourkhāneh), literally the "house of strength". These gyms have a very specific and unique architecture and are covered structures with a single opening in the ceiling, with a sunken 1m-deep octagonal or circular pit in the center (gaud). Around the gaud is a section for the audience, one for the musicians, and one for the athletes.

== Rituals and practice ==
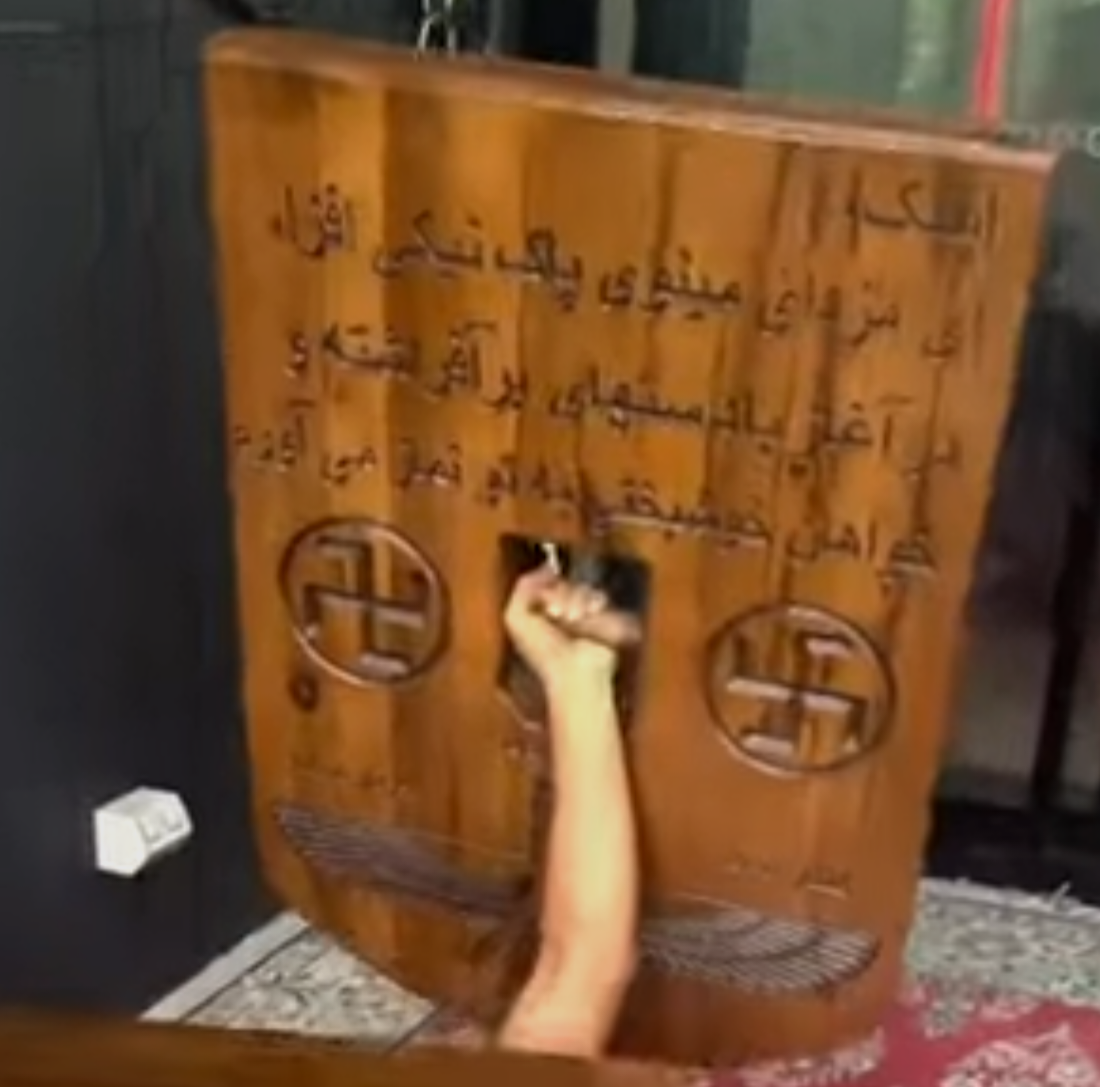
A shield of zoorkhaneh

Bastani rituals mimic the practices and traditions of Sufi orders, as evidenced by terminology like murshed or morshed ("master"), pishkesvat ("leader"), tāj ("crown") and faqr ("pride"). The ethics involved are also similar to Sufi ideals, emphasizing purity of heart. Every session begins with pious praise to the Prophet Muhammed and his family. The morshed dictates the pace by beating a goblet drum (zarb) while reciting Gnostic poems and stories from Persian mythology.

The main portion of a varzesh-e bāstāni session is dedicated to weight training and calisthenics, notably using a pair of wooden clubs (mil), metal shields (sang), and bow-shaped iron weights (kabbādeh or kamān).

Ancient Zoroastrians believed that the development of physical and mental strength could be used to enhance spirituality. Thus, aside from once preparing warriors for battle, this training is supposed to promote kindness and humility through the cultivation of outer strength. Under the supervision of a pishkesvat, students are instructed in traditional ethics and chivalry. Participants are expected to be pure, truthful, good-tempered and only then strong in body. Acquiring the rank of pahlevan (hero) requires mastery of the physical skills, observance of religious principles, and passing the moral stages of Gnosticism. The principles of unpretentiousness are exemplified by a verse recited at many meetings: "Learn modesty, if you desire knowledge. A highland would never be irrigated by a river." (Kanz ol-Haghayegh)

== International Zurkhāneh Sport Federation ==
The International Zurkhāneh Sport Federation (IZSF) was established on October 10, 2004, to promote varzesh-e pahlavāni on a global level. The IZSF aims to regulate and standardize rules for koshti pahlevani and organize international festivals and competitions. In 2010 it started to regulate and organize para-zourkhāneh festivals for disabled athletes. Seventy-two countries are currently members of the IZSF.

== See also ==
- History of physical training and fitness
- Indian club
- Köräş
- Rostam
- Pankration
- Pehlwani
- Sambo
- Ssireum
- Wrestling in Iran
- Yağlı güreş
- Kabadeh
- Kabadeh keshi

== Further information ==
- Abassi, Mehdi (1984). Tarikh-e Koshtigari dar Iran (The History of Wrestling in Iran). Tehran
- Beizai, Hossein Parto (1967). Tarikh-e Varzesh-e Bastani (Zoorkhaneh). Tehran
- Mohammadi, Mohammad; Azizi, Bisotoon; Deimary, Nima (2023). "The Role of Ancient Sports and Zurkhaneh in Ethical Promoting and Religious Virtues". Sport, Ethics and Philosophy. 17 (2): 162–171. doi:10.1080/17511321.2022.2130419.
- Documentary Video of Zurkhaneh Training
- Google Video on "Zurkhaneh"
- Luijendijk, D.H., 2006, Zoor Khane, Ancient Martial Art of Iran, Boulder, US
- PDF reports on Zurkhaneh.com
