= Kurtdereli Mehmet =

Turkish wrestler

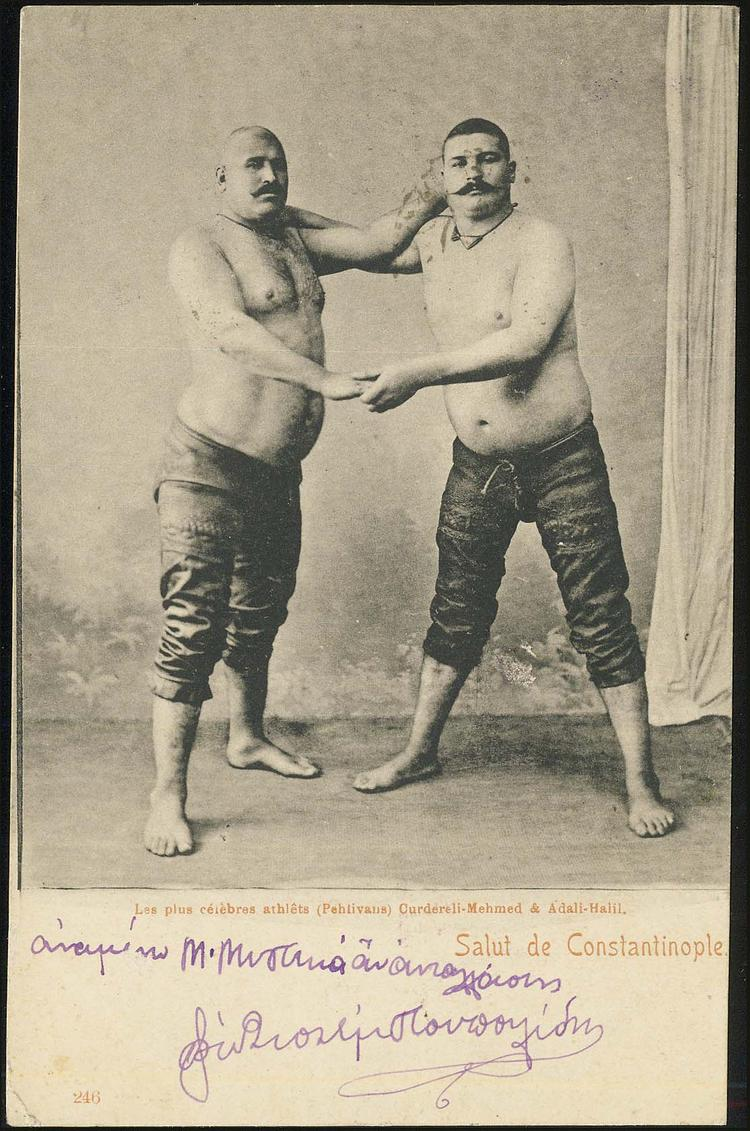
Mehmet Kurtdereli and Halil Adali, Ottoman postcard

Kurtdereli Mehmet Pehlivan (1864 in Bukurovo village near Tırnova – April 11, 1939 in Kurtdere village near Balıkesir) was a Turkish wrestler. He lived most of his life in the village of Kurtdere, 40 km from Balıkesir. He stood 6'5 (196 cm) tall and weighed 326 lb (148 kg).

He fought with all of the famous wrestlers of his time and gained notoriety throughout Asia Minor and Europe. He became wrestling champion (Turkish: başpehlivan) in Kırkpınar, a traditional oil wrestling tournament near Edirne, Turkey. He earned his title by defeating Kara Osman.

He traveled to France, promoted by French wrestler and promoter Joseph Doublier during the "Turkish Invasion," when Doublier recruited and first promoted Turkish wrestlers in France with great commercial success. Among the Turkish wrestlers brought to France by Doublier were Kurtdereli Mehmet Pehlivan, Kartanci Mehmhet Pehlivan, Yusuf Ismail, Kara Osman, and Nurullah Hasan. He later competed in Great Britain, The Netherlands and the USA but was never defeated.

The surname he took after the adoption the 1934 Law in Turkey on Family Names was Baykurt.
