= Oil wrestling =

Traditional Turkish sport

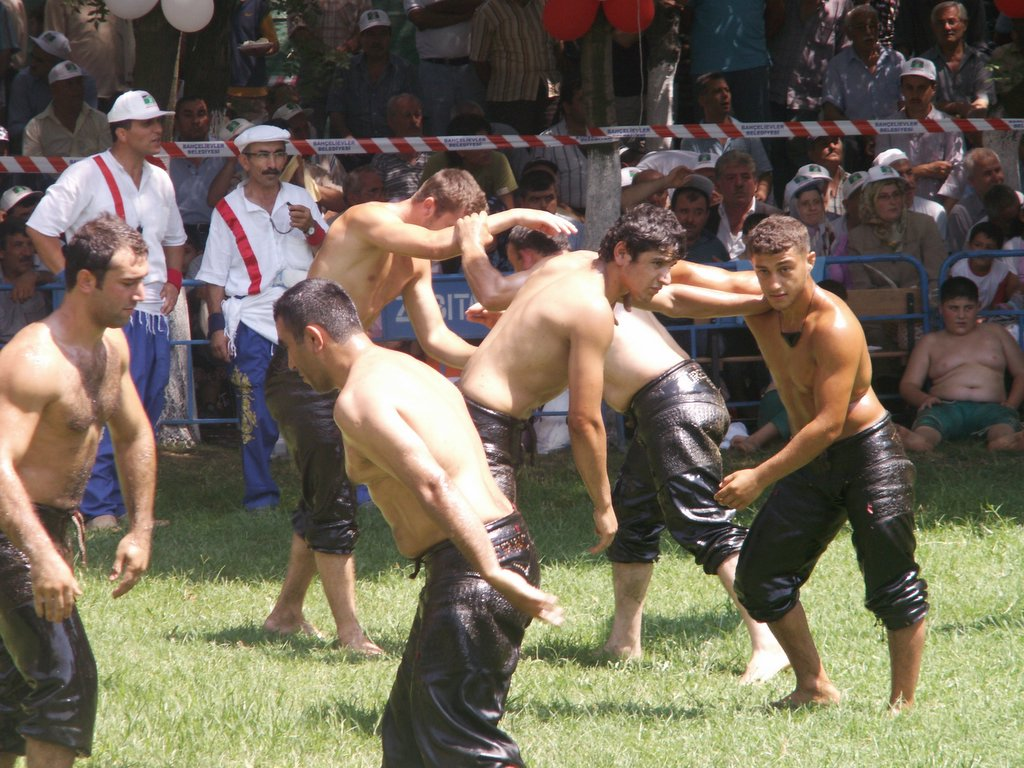
- Tournament at the Kırkpınar oil wrestling festival in Edirne, 2006
- Focus: Wrestling
- Country of origin: Turkey
- Olympic sport: Yes (as freestyle wrestling since 1904)

Oil wrestling (Turkish: Yağlı güreş), also called Turkish oil wrestling, is the national sport of Turkey. Oil wrestling includes oil and traditional dress, and its rules are comparable to karakucak.

In Assyria, ancient Egypt, and Babylonia, oil wrestling was performed. It spread to Iran and Anatolia during the First Achaemenid conquest of Egypt. Oil wrestling was performed by ancient communities 4,500 years ago in Thrace and the Balkans. As the Ottoman Empire extended into Europe, oil wrestling competitions have been held ceremoniously until modern times.

Unlike Olympic wrestling, oil wrestling matches may be won by achieving an effective hold of the kisbet, the loose-fitting leather pants worn during oil wrestling. Thus, the wrestler aims to control his opponent by putting his arm through the latter's kisbet. To win by using this move is called paça kazık. Originally, matches had no set duration and could go on for one or two days until one man was able to establish his superiority, but in 1975 the duration was capped at 40 minutes for the başpehlivan and 30 minutes for the pehlivan category. If there is no winner, play continues for another 15 minutes in the başpehlivan or 10 minutes in the pehlivan category, wherein scores are kept to determine the victor.

The annual Kırkpınar tournament, held in Edirne in Turkish Thrace since 1346, is the oldest continuously running, sanctioned sporting competition in the world. Oil wrestling festivals also take place in the Turkish-inhabited regions of Bulgaria (Ludogorie and Rhodopes), as well as northern Greece in Eastern Macedonia (Serres region) and West Thrace (Rhodope Mountains).

== History ==
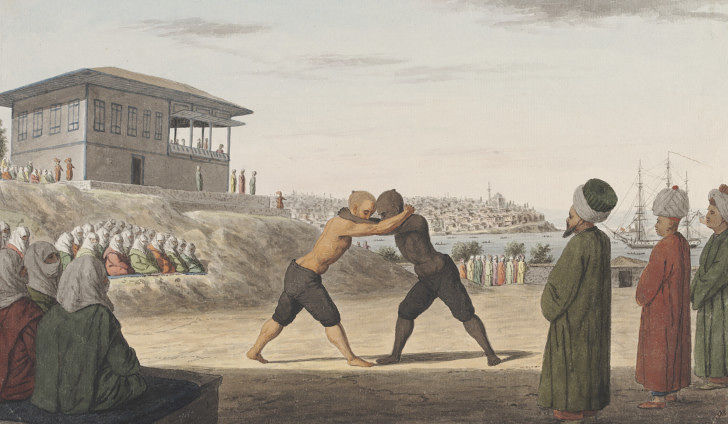
A game of oil wrestling in the gardens of the Topkapi Palace

Practices similar to oil wrestling can be traced back to ancient Sumer and Babylon. It was also a popular sport amongst the Ancient Greeks and the Romans. Cognate forms of folk wrestling are practiced widely by Turkic-speakers found throughout the Western Eurasia under the names Köraş, Khuresh, Kurash and more.

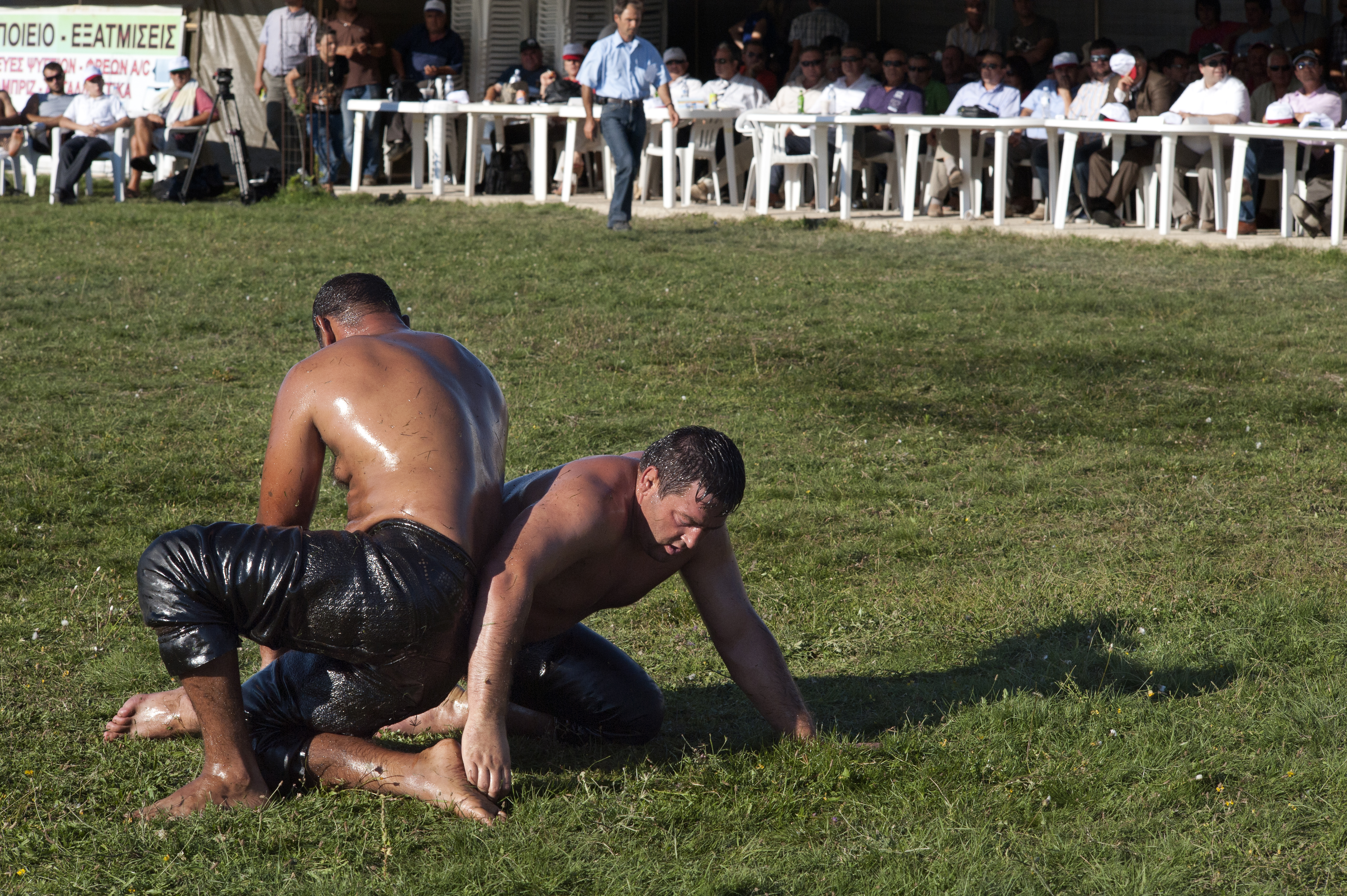
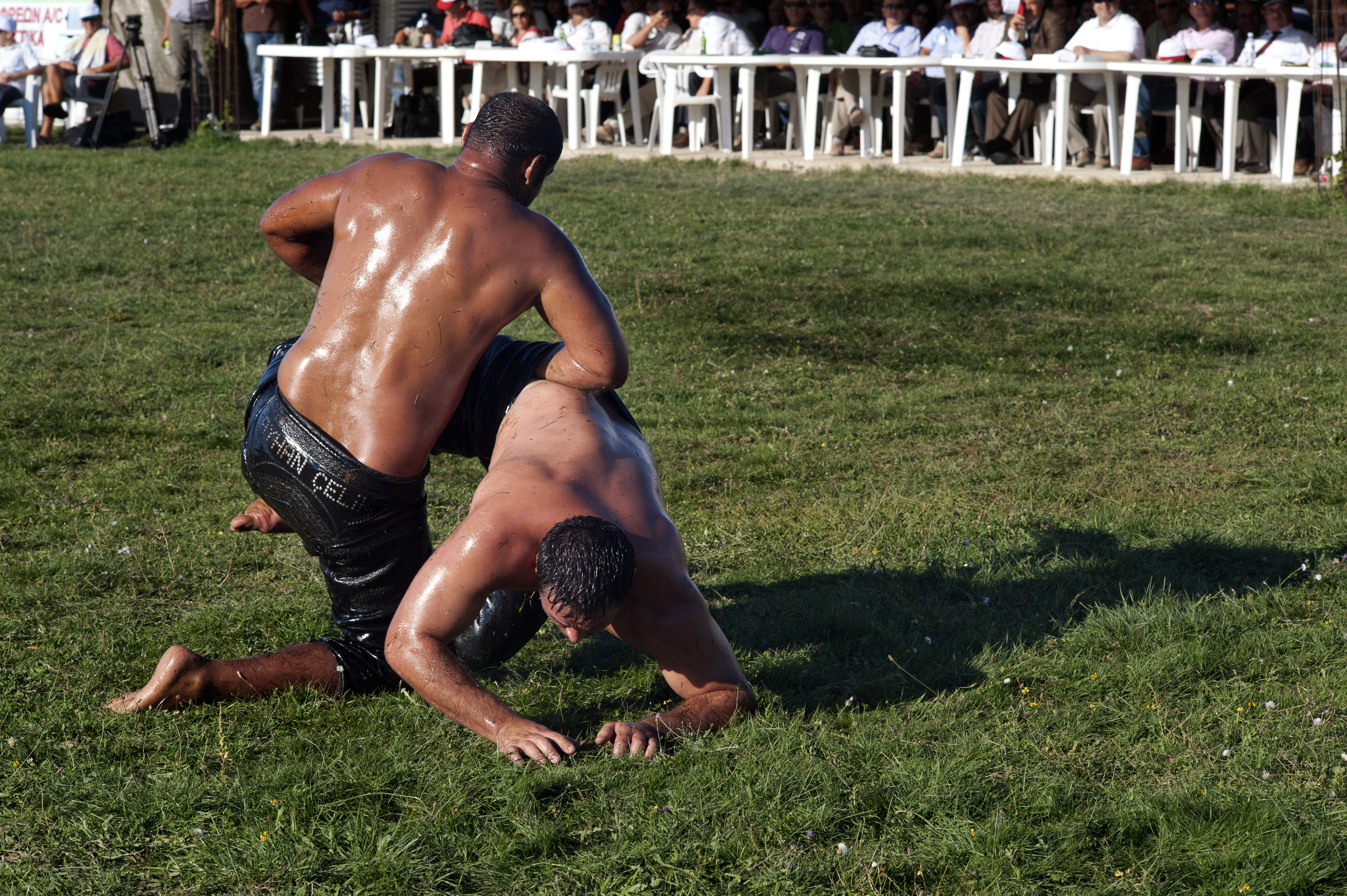
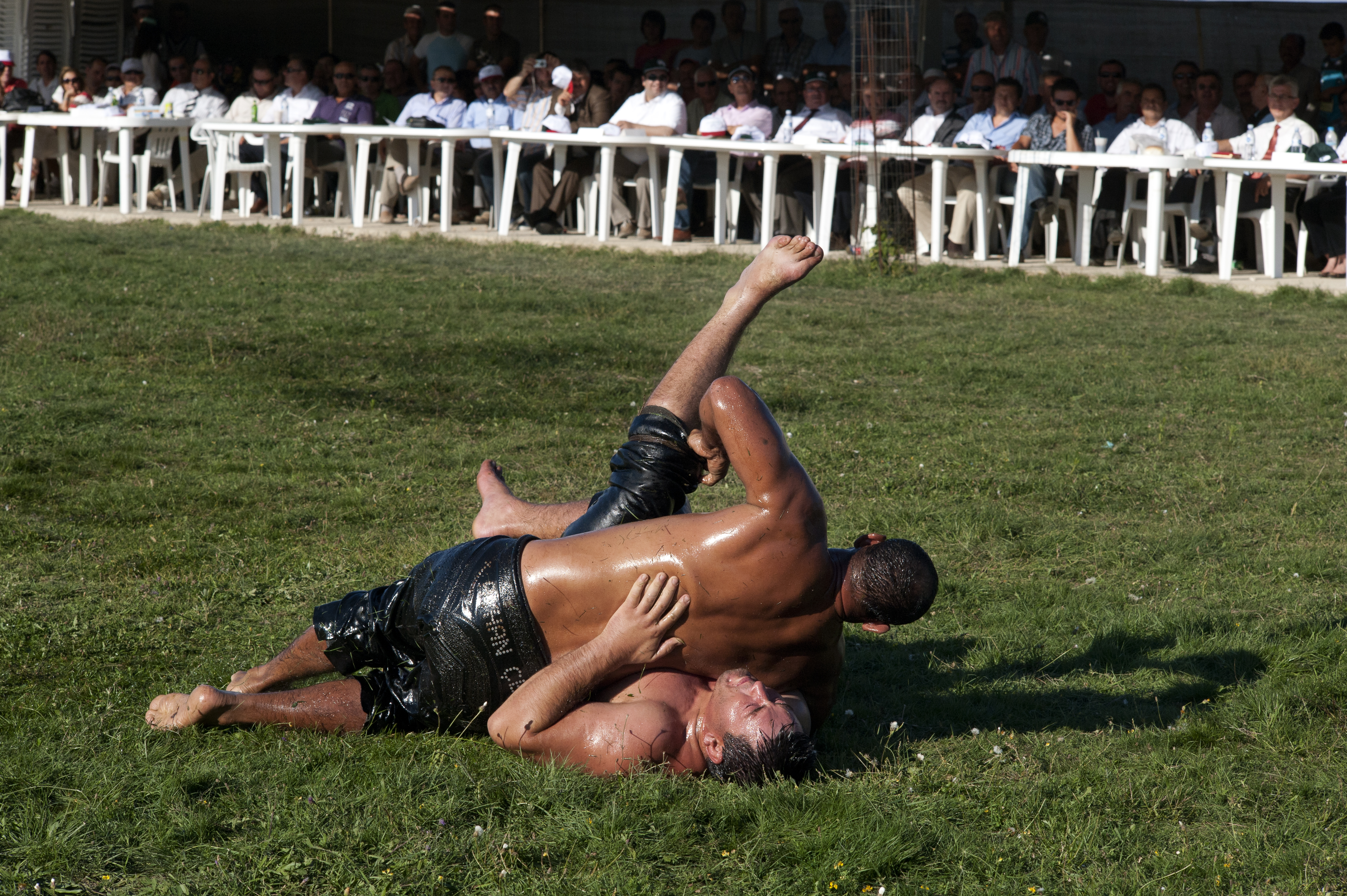
Oil wrestling in Alantepe

The Seljuk Turks brought a form of traditional freestyle wrestling called Karakucak Güreşi (literally "Ground hug") to the region after their conquest of Anatolia, where special leather clothing was worn and wrestlers commenced the competition by pouring olive oil on their bodies. This form evolved into what is currently known as Yağlı Güreş, or Turkish oil wrestling. In the Ottoman Empire, wrestlers trained in special schools called tekke (تکیه), which were both athletic and spiritual centers. Wrestlers oil one another prior to matches as a demonstration of balance and mutual respect. If a man defeats an older opponent, he kisses the latter's hand (a sign of respect for elders in Turkey).

Matches are held all over Turkey throughout the year, but in early summer, around 1000 competitors gather in Kırkpınar for an annual three-day wrestling tournament to determine who will be the winner, or başpehlivan ("chief wrestler"), of Turkey. Evidence from Ottoman chronicles and documents indicate that the Kırkpınar Games have been held every year since 1362. The Guinness Book of World Records accepts this as the world's oldest continually sanctioned sporting competition. The games have only been cancelled about 70 times. In 1924, they were moved to the present location after the Balkan War, some 35 kilometres (22 mi) from the original site.

There are some organized oil wrestling competitions outside Turkey, particularly the ones regulated by the Royal Dutch Power Sport Federation (Koninklijke Nederlandse Krachtsport en Fitnessfederatie (KNKF)) in the Netherlands.

== Rules ==
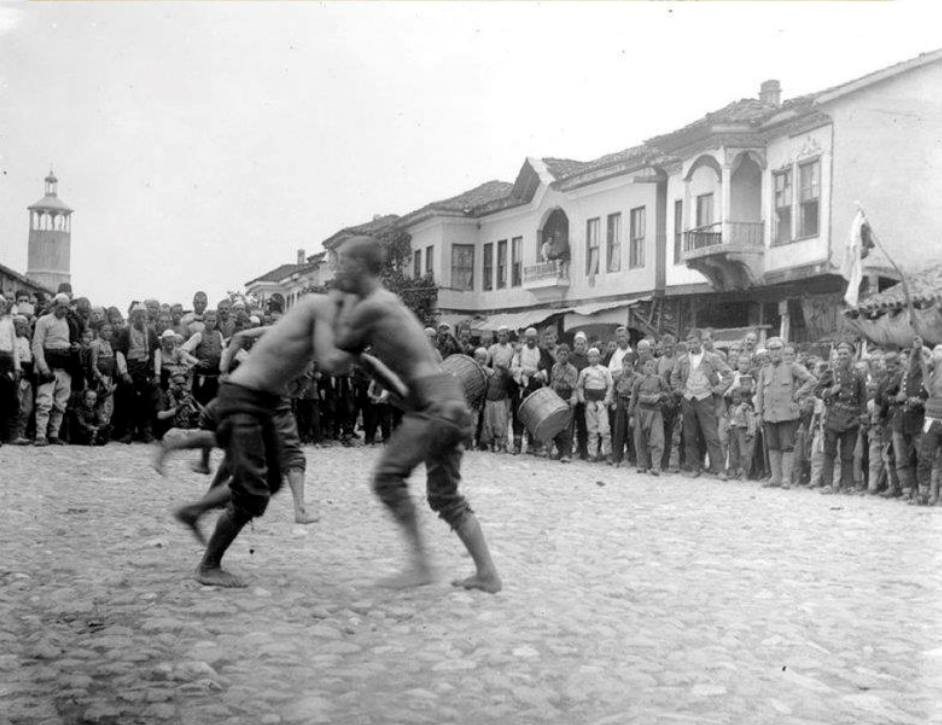
In Gostivar, Macedonia

According to the rules of oil wrestling, the loser is the wrestler whose back touches the ground as a result of the opponent's actions ("showing belly to the stars"); sitting supported by two hands behind them; touching the ground with both elbows or elbow and hand. The winner is the wrestler who raises his opponent and either carries him three steps or spins him around. If a wrestler's kıspet gets pulled down (revealing his genitals), he loses as well, though losing under such circumstances is unlikely.

Before 1975, the duration of each wrestling match was unlimited, which was highly inconvenient from the competition's organizational point of view as matches could drag on for hours. Currently, wrestling is limited to 30 minutes in young categories, and 40 minutes for masters. The winner of a final tournament receives the title of başpehlivan and a monetary award. A pehlivan who won three years successively is awarded a Golden belt. Second and third-place winners are also awarded, and all participating pehlivans receive "trip money."

=== Peşrev ===
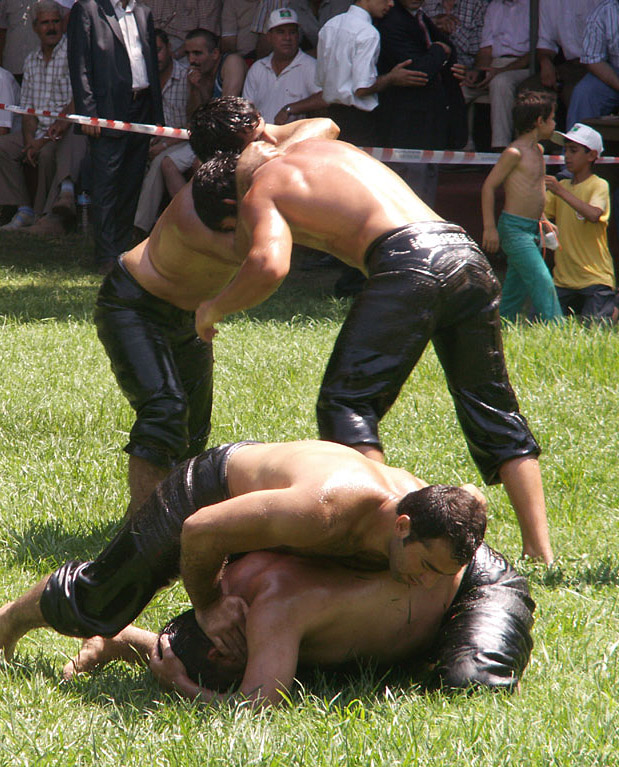
Oil wrestling scene from Turkey

The most important of rituals is peşrev, a theatrical introduction to wrestling, prayer, and warm-up at the same time. Rituals like peşrev also exist in the other kinds of Turkish traditional wrestling (karakucak, aba güreş), but they are much simpler and do not have a developed symbolism. At the beginning of peşrev, wrestlers line up in rows with the başpehlivan (the winner of the previous competitions) on the right. Wrestlers then look toward the Kıbla's side; they take the right hand of the competitor in their own right hand, take the competitor's left hand in their left hand, and listen to cazgır prayer. Holding each other's hands means: "You are more than a brother for me; you are my comrade in a holy war, in struggle on the way of martyrdom (şehadet). We are like heroes Ali and Selim, who became founders of Kırkpınar, we are their representatives now".

== Traditional wear ==
A wrestler's garment comprises only leather pants below the knee called kıspet. Kıspet is derived from the Arabic word Kiswa and adheres to the minimum modesty standard of Muslim men where the garment starts at the belt and goes down to just below the knee, covering their awrah. The word itself came to the Ottoman language through Persian. Until the 1960s, kıspets were made of buffalo skin and weighed between 12 kilograms (26 lb) and 13 kilograms (29 lb). Nowadays, they're typically made of calfskin and weigh about 1.8 kilograms (4.0 lb) or 2.5 kilograms (5.5 lb) when oiled.

== Notable pehlivans ==
- Kel Aliço
- Koca Yusuf
- Katrancı Mehmet Pehlivan
- Adalı Halil
- Hergeleci İbrahim
- Kızılcıklı Mahmut
- Kurtdereli Mehmet
- Bandırmalı Kara Ali
- Tekirdağlı Hüseyin
- İbrahim Karabacak
- Ahmet Taşçı
- Recep Kara
- Ali Gürbüz
- İsmail Balaban
- Orhan Okulu
- Fatih Atlı
- Mehmet Yeşilyeşil
- Osman Aynur
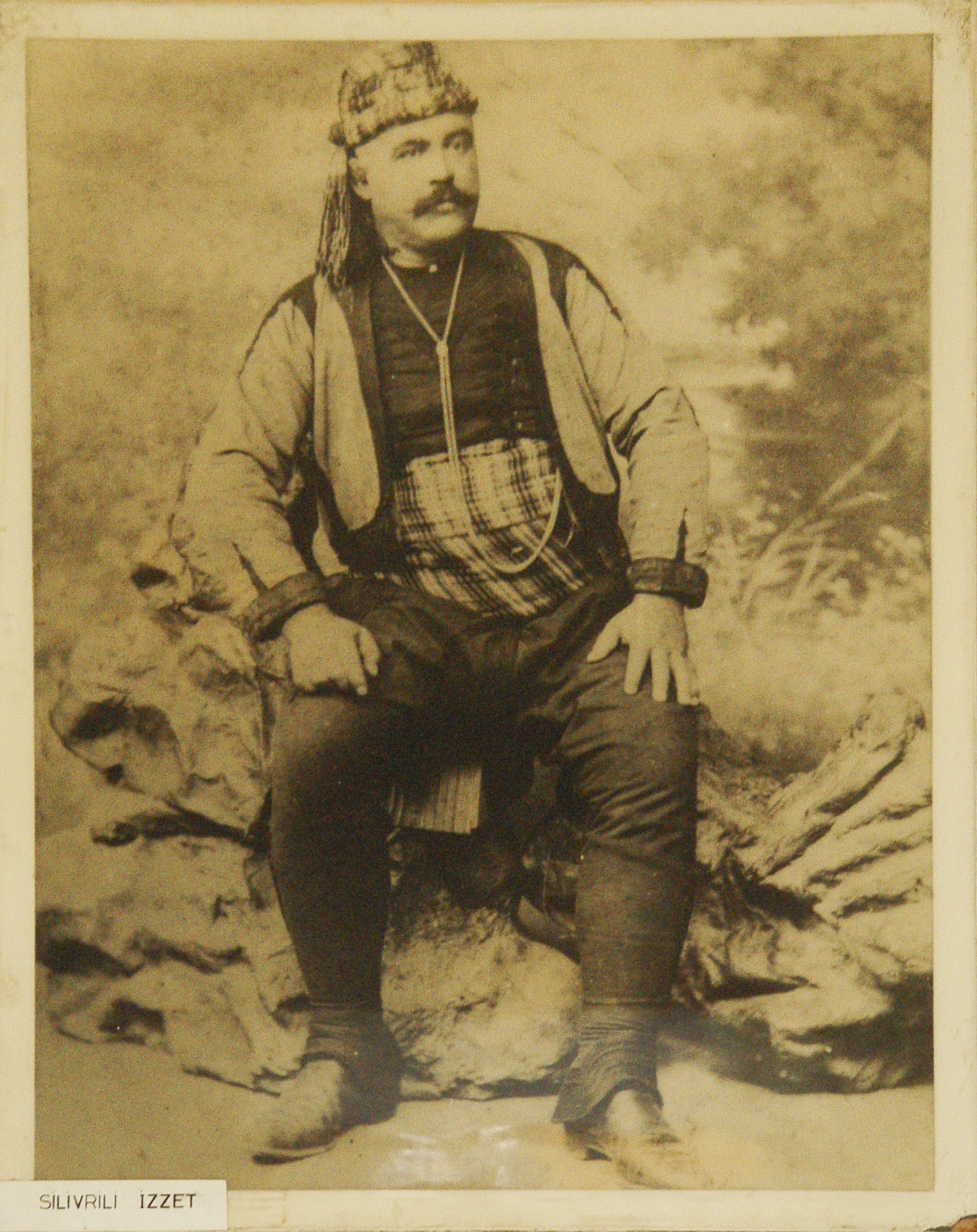
İzzet of Silivri

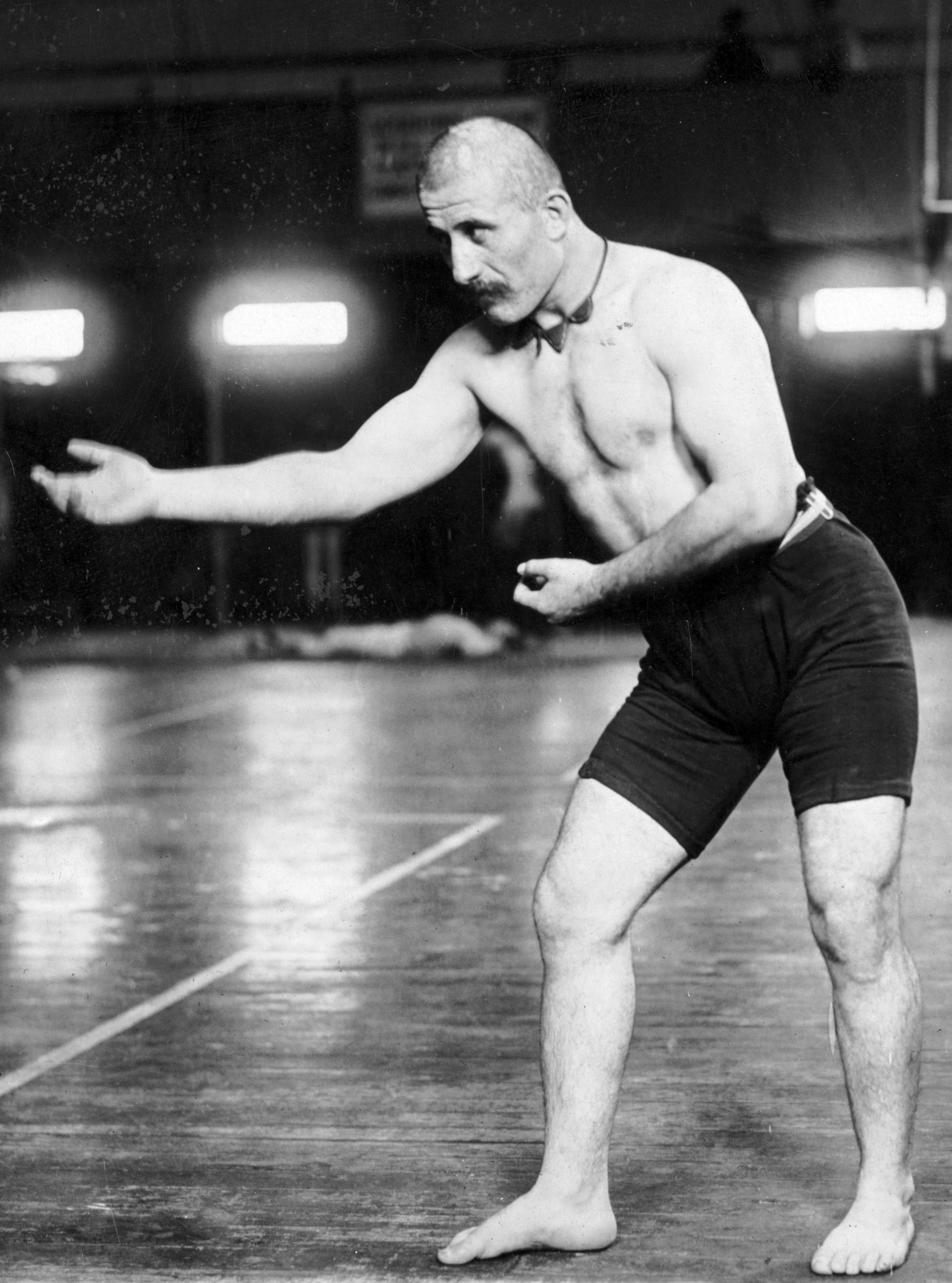
Kızılcıklı Mahmut of Silistra

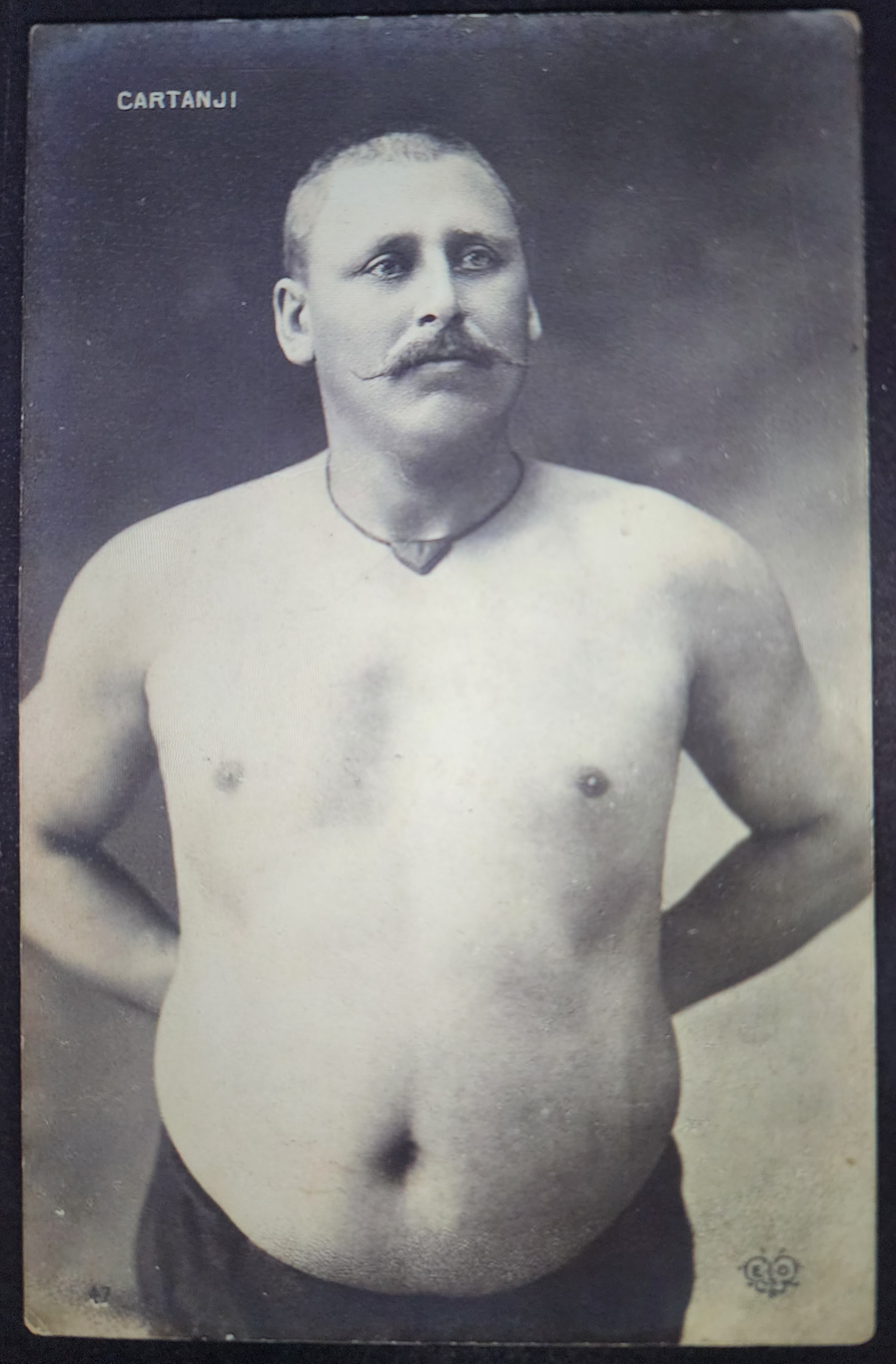
Katrancı Mehmet of Shumen

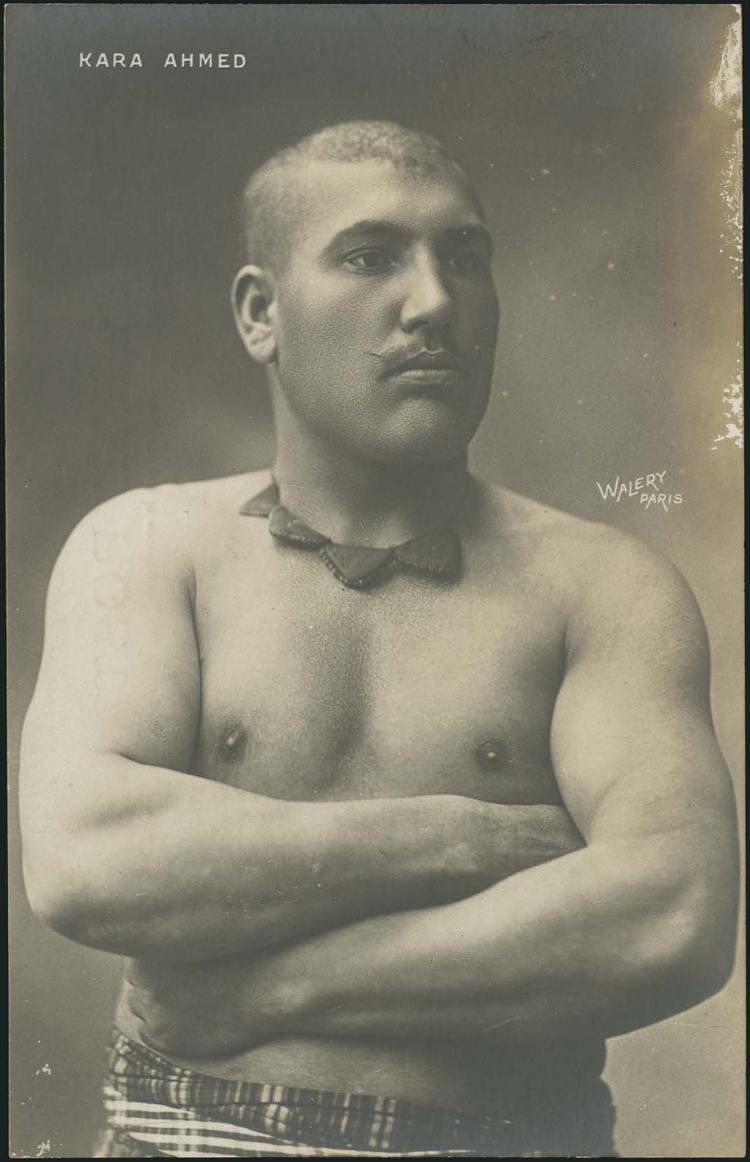
Kara Ahmet of Razgrad

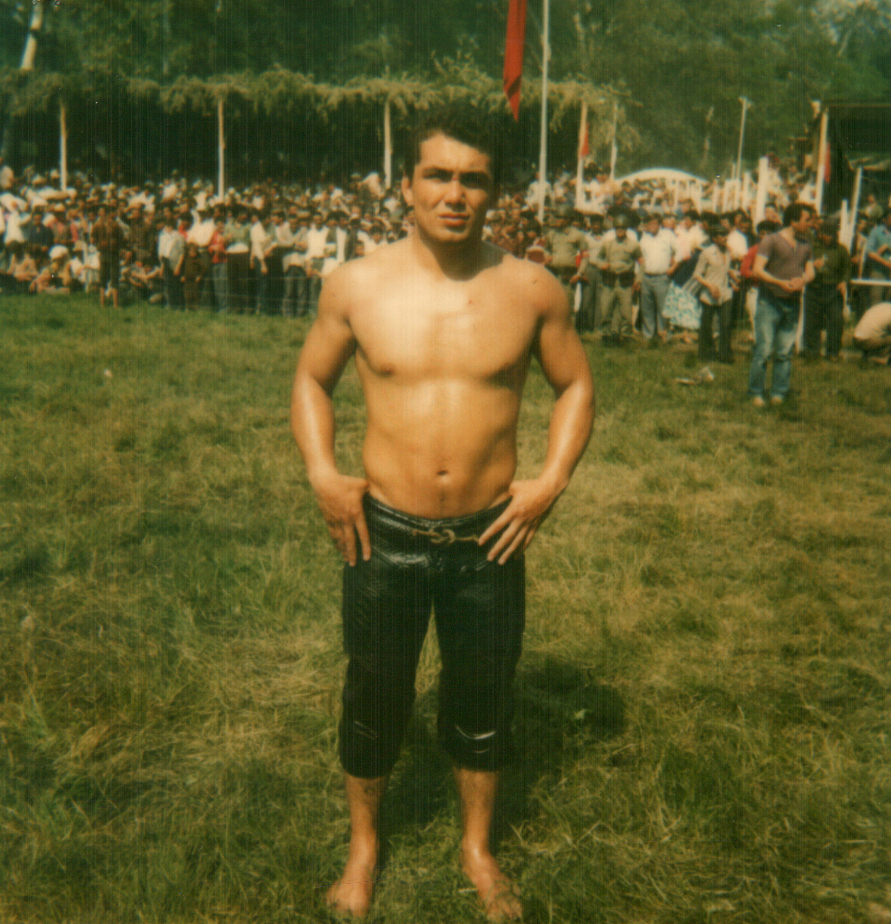
Başol Yağcı of Sındırgı

== Notable aghas ==
- Süleyman Şahin (1967–68)
- Gazanfer Bilge (1969–70)
- Alper Yazoğlu (1991–93) •
- Hüseyin Şahin (1995–98) •
- Seyfettin Selim (2009–13) •

• These aghas were awarded a golden belt.

== See also ==
- Kırkpınar
- Karakucak
- Wrestling in Turkey
- Kurash
- Khuresh
