= Kurash Sports Federation of the Philippines =

National sports federation of Kurash in the Philippines

- IOC nation: Philippines
- Sport: Kurash
- Official website: www.kurashph.com

History
- Year of formation: 2018

Affiliations
- International federation: International Kurash Association (IKA)
- National Olympic Committee: Philippine Olympic Committee

Governing Body
- President: Rolan Llamas
- Address: Parañaque
- Country: Philippines

Kurash Sports Federation of the Philippines is the governing body for the sport of kurash in the Philippines. It is a member of the International Kurash Association and the Philippine Olympic Committee.

== History ==
The Kurash Sports Federation of the Philippines began official competition in 2016. The Philippines competed in kurash at the 2016 Asian Beach Games in Da Nang, Vietnam.

The federation later sent athletes to the 2018 Asian Games held in Jakarta and Palembang, Indonesia after the sport was introduced in the continental games. In 2019, the Philippine Olympic Committee recognized the Philippine Kurash Sports Federation.
