= Karakucak =

Turkish folk wrestling style

Karakucak or Karakucak Güreşi is one of the two Turkish folk wrestling styles practised nationwide and sanctioned by the Turkish Wrestling Federation. Like all other Turkish folk wrestling styles, karakucak competitions are held on grass fields. Competitors wear baggy trousers (şalvar) or special trousers named pırpıt made of canvas or other similarly sturdy fabric. Oiling the bodies and/or garments is strictly prohibited. Apart from this, Karakucak rules resemble Turkish oil wrestling rules. Among several local styles, Köprülü karakucak practised mainly in Çukurova has rules almost identical with Olympic freestyle wrestling.

== See also ==
- Wrestling in Turkey
- Kurash
- Oil Wrestling
- Khuresh
- Folk wrestling
