= Cehennemağzı Caves =

Cave system in Turkey

- Cehennemağzı Mağaraları
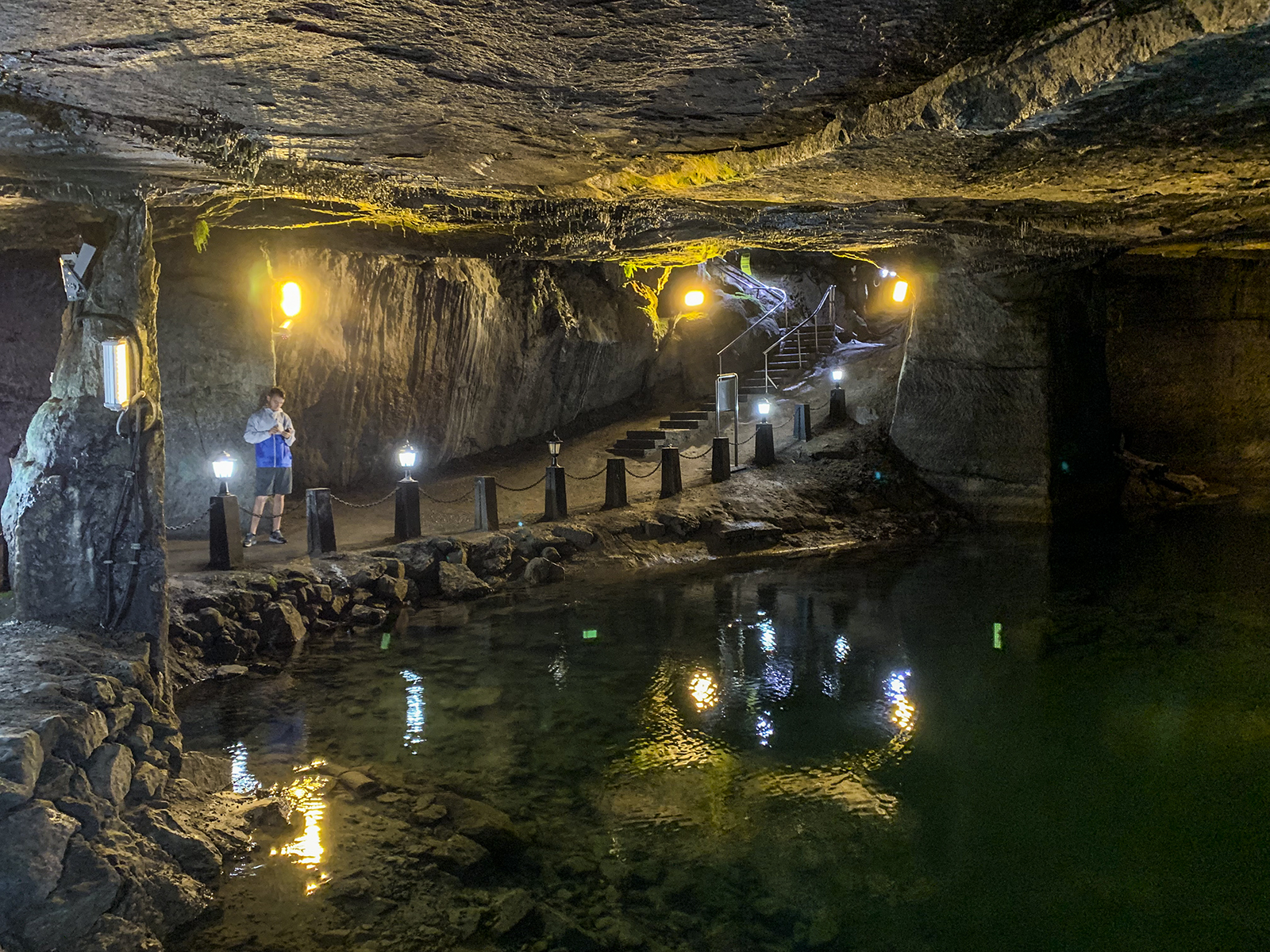

- Location within Turkey
- Location: Karadeniz Ereğli, Zonguldak Turkey
- Coordinates: 41°19′01″N 31°26′57″E
- Show cave opened: 2001; 25 years ago
- Visitors: 26,853 (2016)
- Features: Early Christian church

The Cehennemağzı Caves (Turkish: Cehennemağzı Mağaraları) are a series of three quarries lined side by side, in the Karadeniz Ereğli district of Zonguldak Province, northern Turkey. One of the quarries was used as a church in early Christianity, in other words mining was abandoned before. The "cave" is a proper name, not an actual geological classification. Also its easy to mix it up, as those quarries have speleothems, which were growing since the mining ended about 2,000 years ago, so they have decent size.

== Overview ==
The quarries are located in the Uzunmehmet neighborhood of Karadeniz Ereğli, the region known in the Antiquity as the Acheron Valley. The quarries are an archaeological site affiliated with the Ereğli Museum. There are three quarries lined up side by side.

== The quarries ==
The first quarry is arranged in two sections. In the first section, the floor is paved with a mosaic of original plants and geometric motifs. There are columns, capitals and oil lamp niches. A small apse was opened on the eastern wall of the second section, and there are steps in front of it. This quarry, which is a very old Christian church, was used as a secret place of worship in the first years of Christianity.

The second quarry is located on the about 10–12 m (33–39 ft) high slope by the roadside. It is called the Koca Yusuf Cave by the local people. The quarry, which is reached by a 3-step vertical staircase through a narrow entrance on the slope, continues into the mountain for 1.5 km (0.93 mi). Since a rock falling from the ceiling closed the road in the 1960s, it can only be reached to a depth of 350 m (1,150 ft). In this quarry it is possible to see that it wasdug out by humans as traces of stonemasonry work cover an area of about 400 m^{2} (4,300 sq ft), and it is supported by two massive rectangular pillars, an old mining technique called room and pillar mining.

The third quarry is the largest in terms of area. Its floor is covered with groundwater. Thequarry served as a water source or cistern for the first and second caves.

== Mythology ==
According to the Greek mythology, the Cehennemağzı Mağaraları (for "Hell's Mouth Caves") is the place, where the divine hero Herakles landed in the Land of the Dead to kidnap Cerberus, the hound of Hades, the god of the dead and the king of the underworld. These caves are known to be one of the two most important prophecy centers of antiquity. The other is in the Greek city of Delphi.

== Tourist site ==
The quarries were opened to the public in 2001. Also a religious tourism destination, the quarry is open for visiting between 9 and 19 hours local time. It is closed on Mondays and weekends. It was reported that a total of 26,853 tourists visited the caves in 2016. In the first six months of 2018, the caves attracted about 13,000 domestic and foreign visitors. The number of visitors in the last five years totaled around 140,000.
