= Khuresh =

Traditional Tuvan wrestling in Siberia

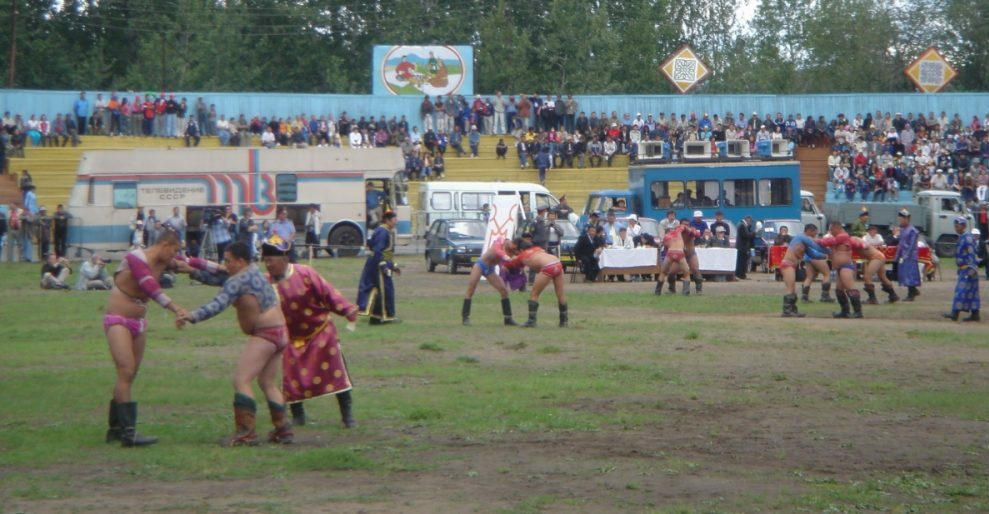
Khuresh competition in Tos-Bulak at the Naadym festival of 2005.

Khuresh (Tuvan: Хүреш, romanized: Hüreš) is a traditional Tuvan wrestling, in SiberiaIt is semilar to Malakhra a traditional Sindhi kind of wrestling. The word has cognates with Tuvan's sister Turkic languages, for example Turkish güreş and Tatar köräş (all ultimately derived from Old Turkic küresh).

== See also ==
- Kurash
- Wrestling in Turkey
- Yağlı güreş
- Mongolian wrestling
- Sambo
