= Kızılcıklı Mahmut =

Turkish wrestler (1878 – 1931)

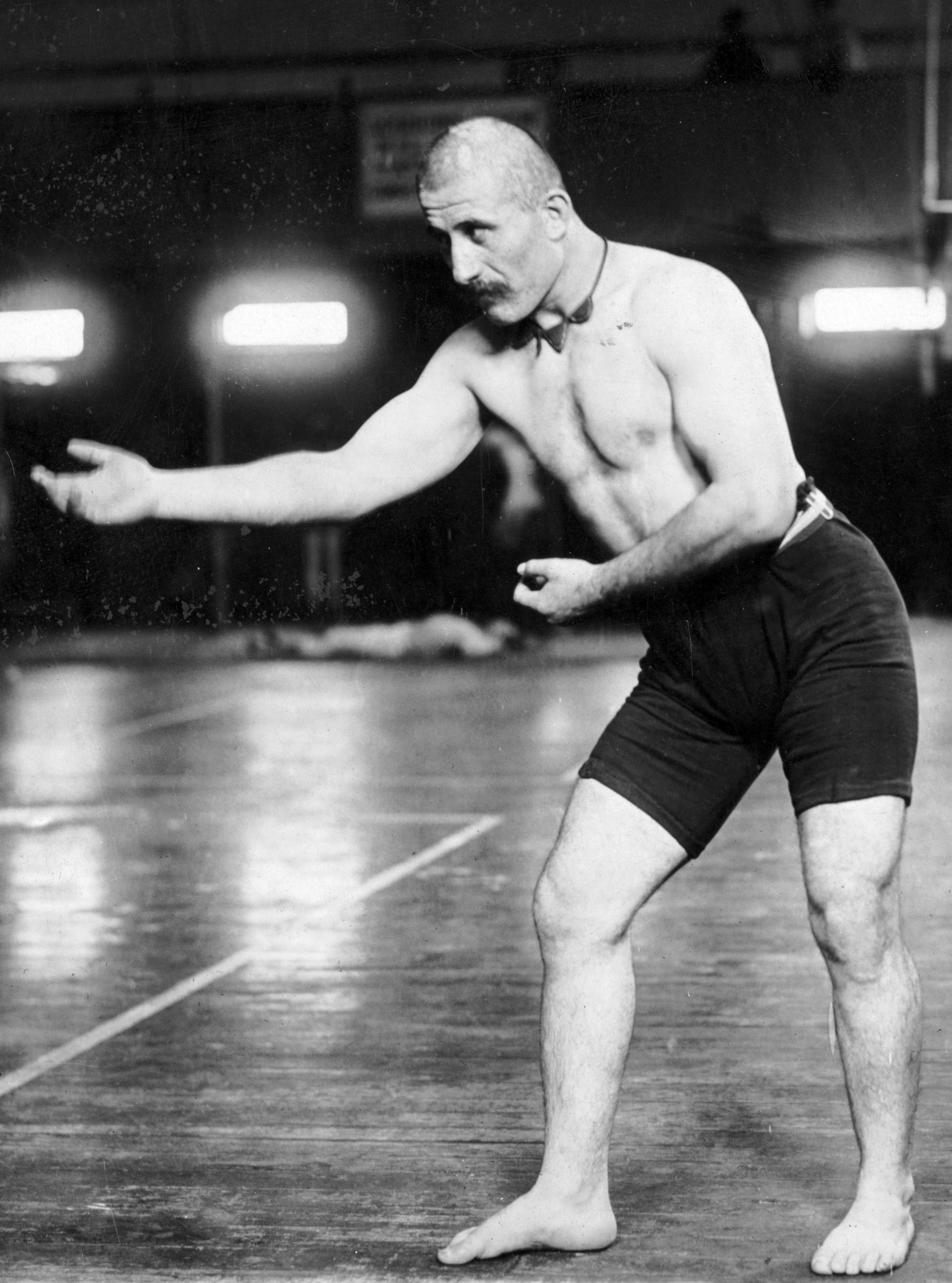
Mahmut

Kızılcıklı Mahmut Pehlivan (b. 1878 or 1880 in Kızılcık village near Silistra, Principality of Bulgaria (a vassal state under the suzerainty of the Ottoman Empire) – d. February 3, 1931 in Eskişehir, Turkey) was a Turkish wrestler foremost known for his victory over Tom Jenkins in 1908 and loss to Frank Gotch in 1909 during a North American tour.

Given Yusuf İsmail's fame, American professional wrestling promoters chose to launch Mahmut with the ring name Youssouf Mahmout as the son of Yusuf İsmail and further, "the Terrible Turk", a moniker originally carried by Yusuf İsmail.

A main street in Eskişehir, the Anatolian city he later settled is named after him.
