= Nurullah Hasan =

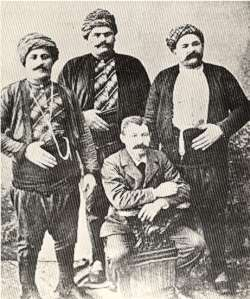
The members of the "Turkish invasion" in 1894 (from left to right): Kara Osman of Plovdiv, Nurullah, Yusuf of Shumen, and Joseph Doublier.

Ali Nurullah Hasan was a Turkish wrestler. He was known with his nickname as Filiz Nurullah Pehlivan to the Turkish public whereas he used the alias Hassan Nurullah for his professional wrestling career in Western Europe. He stood 6'6" (200½ cm) tall and weighed 350 pounds (160 kg).

== Early life ==
Nurullah was born in 1867 or 1870 in Bıyıklı village near Şumnu, Danube Vilayet in the territory of the Ottoman Empire. At eleven years of age, Nurullah was trained in oil wrestling by Yusuf İsmail.

== Career ==
In 1894, Yusuf İsmail accompanied him and Kara Osman of Plovdiv on their journey to Paris, organised by French former wrestler and promoter Joseph Doublier. Nurullah's impressive physique (standing 2.00 m (6 ft 7 in) tall and weighing 159 kg (350 lbs), although exaggerated figures have also existed) was then noted as a tackle for finding eager opponents. Nevertheless, Nurullah trained in Greco-Roman wrestling and started competing at Folies Bergère by 1895.

Nurullah is renowned for his long rivalries with two formidable exponents of French/Greco-Roman wrestling: Paul Pons and Kara Ahmet.

Nurullah quit wrestling in 1911 and died a year later in Istanbul.
