= Fylakio =

Fylakio Φυλάκιο
- Community
- Location within Greece
- Coordinates: 41°35′N 26°19′E
- Country: Greece
- Administrative region: East Macedonia and Thrace
- Regional unit: Evros
- Municipality: Orestiada
- Municipal unit: Kyprinos

Population (2021)
  - Community: 867
- Time zone: UTC+2 (EET)
  - Summer (DST): UTC+3 (EEST)
- Vehicle registration: EB

Fylakio (Greek: Φυλάκιο) is a village in the Evros regional unit of northeast Greece. Fylakio is in the municipal unit of Kyprinos. In 2021 the population was 867 for the community, including the villages Ammovouno and Keramos. It is located on the right bank of the river Ardas, about halfway between Ivaylovgrad (Bulgaria) and Edirne (Turkey).

== Population ==
Year	Village population	Community population
1981	-	1,015
1991	555	-
2001	473	947
2011	595	971
2021	635	867

== History ==
Towards the end of Ottoman rule, Fylakio's inhabitants were 3/4 Bulgarian and 1/4 Turkish. After a brief period of Bulgarian rule between 1913 and 1919, it became part of Greece. Greek refugees from Asia Minor arrived in the village following the end of the war.

== Fylakio detention center ==
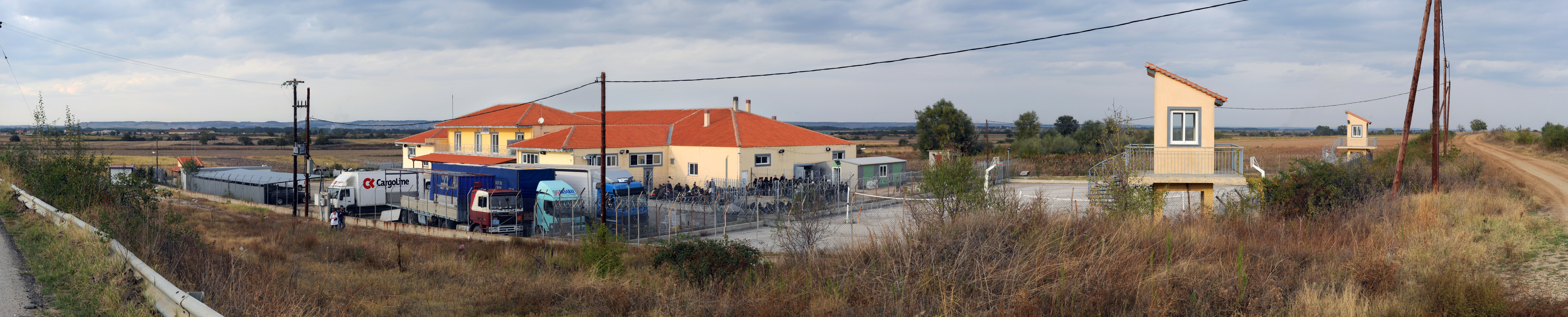
Fylakio detention center for immigrants, refugees that has been arrested in the Greek-Turkish borders.

South east of the village there is an immigration detention center housing people arrested for illegally crossing the nearby border with Turkey.

== See also ==
- List of settlements in the Evros regional unit
