= Tos-Bulak =

Rural locality in Tuva Republic, Russia

Tos-Bulak Тос-Булак
- Interactive map of Tos-Bulak
- Location of Tos-Bulak
- Coordinates: 51°38′02″N 94°26′02″E
- Country: Russia

Tos-Bulak is the name of an area of open fields and a mineral spring situated at 51.634°N 94.434°E, some 9 km south of Kyzyl, Tyva. It is the location of the Naadym festival (15 August), the Tyvan Republic Day, where various competitions such as horseriding and khuresh (wrestling) are held.
