= Yusuf İsmail =

Turkish professional wrestler

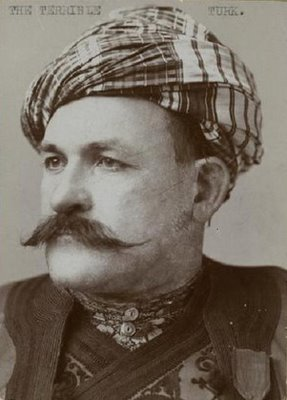

Personal information
- Born: 1857 Village of Karalar (Cherna), near Shumen (Current Bulgaria), Özü Eyalet, Ottoman Empire
- Died: July 4, 1898 (aged 40–41) off Nova Scotia, Canada

Professional wrestling career
- Ring name(s): Yusuf Ismail, the Big Yusuf
- Billed height: 6 ft 2 in (1.88 m)
- Billed weight: 305 lb (138 kg)
- Billed from: Shumen, Ottoman Empire
- Debut: 1894

Yusuf İsmail (1857 – July 4, 1898), also known as Youssouf Ishmaelo, was a Turkish professional wrestler who competed in Europe and the United States as Yusuf Ismail the Terrible Turk during the 1890s. During his lifetime, native Turks knew him as Şumnulu Yusuf Pehlivan. However, writer Rıza Tevfik posthumously awarded him the honorific Koca ("Great"), and thus he was later remembered as Koca Yusuf.

Known for his massive size and brute strength, he was recognized as one of the top three strongmen in the world by Alan Calvert, a pioneer of American weight training, and photographer Edmond Desbonnet during the turn of the century. Prior to his arrival in the United States, he remained undefeated in his near four-year career and successfully challenged Evan "Strangler" Lewis for the American Heavyweight Championship in 1898. Yusuf Ismail was the original wrestler to be known as "the Terrible Turk", but several others, including Kızılcıklı Mahmut (promoted as his son) and Armenian-American Robert Manoogian, also used the name throughout the first half of the 20th century.

After earning a small fortune wrestling in the United States, Yusuf was heading back home to Europe on the Compagnie Générale Transatlantique's 12 year old ship, the SS La Bourgogne. He distrusted banks and carried all of his winnings, estimated to be between $8,000 and $10,000 in gold coins, in a heavy canvas money belt strapped around his waist. The sheer volume of gold coins weighed around 40 to 50 pounds. When the La Bourgogne collided with the Cromartyshire and sank on 4 July 1898, İsmail was lost in the sinking.

== Biography ==
=== Early career and the "Turkish Invasion" ===
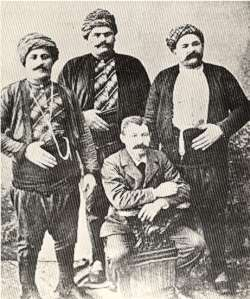
The members of the "Turkish invasion" (from left to right): Kara Osman, Nurullah Hasan, French promoter Joseph Doublier, and Yusuf Ismail

Little is known of his early life prior to his first wrestling appearance in 1894, however, according to Scottish wrestling historian William Baxter, Yusuf Ismail was born Youssuf Ishmaelo in Bulgaria (then part of the Ottoman Empire) in 1857 to a Muslim Turkish family. Ismail first came to prominence when he won the Kırkpınar Tournament in 1887. Edmond Desbonnet claimed in his book Les Rois de la Lutte (1910) that the Turkish invasion began in 1894 after a wrestler named Joseph Doublier was defeated by a rival, Sabès. In search of someone who could defeat Sabès, Doublier visited Turkey and brought back three wrestlers: Kara Osman, Nurullah Hasan, and the 6'2", 250-pound Yusuf Ismail. Doublier had also brought Katrancı Mehmet Pehlivan and Kurtdereli Mehmet Pehlivan to Paris a while before. In his Paris debut, Ismail defeated Sabès in four seconds. Sabès had attempted to use a front belt hold, but Ismail withstood the hold and pinned him using a chokehold.

Ismail spent the next three years in France, where he dominated opponents. A colorful figure, he was also known for his fierce pride. When rivals Antonio Pierri and Tom Cannon threatened to bring in a wrestler to defeat him, Ismail reportedly said he would cut his own throat if he was ever beaten. His match against another fellow Turk, Ibrahim Mahmut, was said to be one of the "most brutal bouts ever seen on the mat" at the Cirque d'Hiver in Paris. Ismail became so enraged during the match that he tore at Mahmut's nostrils, broke his ribs, and twisted his arms. Although referee Tom Cannon had attempted to stop the match, only the intervention of a police inspector and six officers along with several spectators were able to separate the two. Kara Osman had been originally scheduled to face Ismail but had fallen ill, and Mahmut had taken his place. According to a rumor heard by French promoter Joseph Doublier, Osman had actually withdrawn from the match because he feared for his life because of an unspecified grudge between Ismail and himself.

=== Tour of the United States ===
He continued to be managed by Doublier until 1898, when Antonio Pierri took him to New York. Taken on by promoter William A. Brady, the two appeared at the London Theatre in New York, offering $100 to anyone who could stay in the ring with him for 15 minutes. George Bothner, a well known lightweight wrestler, was the only one to accept the challenge. Although outweighed by Ismail by at least 100 pounds, Bothner claimed that "there wasn't a man alive who could pin him on his back in 15 minutes" and accused Ismail of being an impostor "like so many other so-called terrors". Despite his bravado, Bothner was defeated by Ismail several days later and suffered a neck injury during the match. He described their encounter years later to Nat Fleischer in his book From Milo to Londos (1937):

He was a modern Hercules and he knew how to apply his punishing strength, as he was as quick as a jungle cat and master of all holds. Youssuf came at me like a bull. He rushed me right off the mat into a bunch of chorus girls in the wing. The first thing I knew I found myself helpless. The Turk picked me up as if I was a kitten. Never before have I felt such terrible strength. Before I could give a wiggle or squirm he dashed me down on the boards with terrific force, knocking all the strength and wits out of me... They told me that after I had landed, Youssuf rolled me over with his foot, looked out over the audience, gave a contemptuous snort and walked off the stage. When I came to, I was a sadder, but wiser young man. Somehow or other I got into my clothes, hobbled out into the street and started to walk up Third Avenue towards my home. Youssuf had given my neck such a wrench that he almost tore it from my shoulders. It was several days before I could look in the direction I was headed.

— George Bothner, From Milo to Londos (1906) by Nat Fleischer

He was undefeated prior to his arrival in New York until his disqualification in a match against World Greco-Roman Heavyweight Champion Ernest Roeber at Madison Square Garden on March 26, 1898. Ismail, who may have intentionally fouled himself, caused the crowd to riot when he pushed Roeber out of the ring, a raised platform, and caused him to fall headfirst onto the ground five feet below. Roeber was unconscious for several minutes, and many in the crowd believed he had been killed, causing spectators to charge into the ring. Only a small police guard under Chief of Police John H. McCullagh were able to block the crowd from entering.

Roeber was revived after a few minutes and examined by physicians for injuries. Having landed on his shoulder, it was announced that he had suffered a back injury and it was decided that he would not be able to continue. Referee Hugh Leonard awarded the match to Roeber and, with calls to "Kill the Turk" and threats of lynching from those in attendance, Ismail was escorted by police to his dressing room. Ismail's manager, William Brady, offered to stage an exhibition bout between Ismail and Tom Cannon, but McCullagh refused to allow the event to continue due to concerns of rioting. The match was described in the 1907 novel The Substitute: A Football Story by sports writer Walter Camp.

A rematch between Ismail and Roeber was held at the Metropolitan Opera House on April 30. During the bout, the two began a shoving match, which caused their managers, William Brady and Martin Julian, to enter the ring. Brady and Julian, who also managed rival heavyweight boxing champions Jim Corbett and Bob Fitzsimmons, began arguing over the management of their respective men. When Fitzsimmons attempted to intervene, several fans stormed the ring and referee Herman Wolff declared the match a no-contest before the event could once again end in a near-riot. Opera House management closed the venue to wrestling events soon after.

In Chicago on June 20, 1898, İsmail faced American champion Evan "Strangler" Lewis in front of a reported audience of 10,000, for a purse of $3,500 and the “championship of the world”, and the stranglehold Lewis was known for was barred. Within three minutes, İsmail as able to get Lewis into a stranglehold so the fall was awarded to Lewis. After being cautioned a second time for the stranglehold, İsmail won the second and third rounds in six and seven minutes respectively, though the method was reported to be a stranglehold again, which was barred. Afterwards Lewis was quoted as saying, “I was licked. The Turk is the better man.” This was İsmail's last match.

=== Death ===
Shortly after his victory over Lewis, Ismail took the first ship back to Europe, where he reportedly planned to open a coffee or bazaar in his native village near Shumen. He was one of 562 people who drowned when the ocean liner La Bourgogne sank on the morning of July 4, 1898. According to colorful accounts from the New York press, Ismail fell overboard while passengers were being evacuated to the lifeboats. Dragged underwater by the weight of his money belt, supposedly containing between $8,000 and $10,000 in gold coins, he drowned before the crew could get to him. Other journalists and surviving passengers claim to have seen "the Terrible Turk" throw women and children overboard trying to reach the lifeboats; however no mention of this was included in the official report and is generally assumed to have originated by Ismail's manager and promoter William Brady, who went on to become a successful Broadway producer.

== Cultural depictions ==
In 1966, the film "Koca Yusuf" starring Özdemir Aydın as Koca Yusuf.

== See also ==
- List of people who disappeared at sea

== Championships and accomplishments ==
- Professional wrestling
  - American Heavyweight Championship (1 time)
- International Professional Wrestling Hall of Fame
  - Class of 2021
