= Hergeleci İbrahim =

Turkish professional wrestler

İbrahim Mahmut (1862 in Ezerçe, near Razgrad, Özü Eyalet – 1917 in Sarımeşe, near İzmit, İstanbul Vilayet), nicknamed Hergeleci (Turkish for "trainer of unbroken horses"), was a pehlivan (oil wrestler) from the Ottoman Empire, who also performed as a professional wrestler. He was the Kırkpınar champion in 1914.

== Championships and accomplishments ==
- One-time Kırkpınar Champion, 1914
