= Kyprinos =

Kyprinos Κυπρίνος
- Municipal unit
- Location within the regional unit

- Location within Greece
- Coordinates: 41°34′N 26°14′E
- Country: Greece
- Administrative region: East Macedonia and Thrace
- Regional unit: Evros
- Municipality: Orestiada

Area
  - Municipal unit: 136.0 km^{2} (52.5 sq mi)
- Elevation: 63 m (207 ft)

Population (2021)
  - Municipal unit: 1,732
  - Municipal unit density: 12.74/km^{2} (32.98/sq mi)
  - Community: 571
- Time zone: UTC+2 (EET)
  - Summer (DST): UTC+3 (EEST)
- Vehicle registration: EB

Kyprinos (Greek: Κυπρίνος) is a town and a former municipality in the Evros regional unit, East Macedonia and Thrace, Greece. Since the 2011 local government reform it is part of the municipality Orestiada, of which it is a municipal unit. The municipal unit has an area of 135.976 km^{2}. In 2021 its population was 571 for the community and 1,732 for the municipal unit. Kyprinos is located southwest of Edirne, Turkey, west-northwest of Orestiada, north of Alexandroupoli and about 5 to 6 km east of Kurdzhali and the Bulgarian frontier, where there is a border crossing. Athens is approximately 1,050 km to the southwest. Komara is on the other side of the river Ardas.

== Name origin ==
The Turkish name of Kyprinos was at first "Simavna", after "Sarihadir". Kyprinos was once called "Sarihadir" what means "yellow Hadir". Hadir is Hidir who was an Islamic religious figure. His holiday was celebrated at the same day the Greek Christian Saint St. George's holiday was celebrated (April, 23rd). St. George was and still is the guardian Saint of the village Kyprinos and also its church' name-giver. So the Turkish just interpreted Kyprinos as the village with the yellow church -which indeed was made out of yellow stones- meaning St. George, whom they considered to be something like the religious person whom they knew as Hadir. The church is still there down in the valley and can be visited at any time. When the great flood of the 1920s destroyed every house of the village which at that time was also located in the valley not a single building resisted its power except for that church. The Greek name "Kyprinos" means "carp". It is not clear whether that name was given to the village because of the carps found in the nearby Ardas river or for some other reasons.

The name is rendered in Bulgarian as Саръхадър, Saryhadyr.

== Subdivisions ==
The municipal unit Kyprinos is subdivided into the following communities (constituent villages in brackets):

- Kyprinos (Kyprinos, Galini)
- Fylakio (Fylakio, Keramos, Ammovouno)
- Zoni (Zoni, Chelidona, Mikra Doxipara)

== Population ==
Year	Town population	Municipal unit population
1981	1,926	-
1991	1,320	3,478
2001	1,157	2,915
2011	806	2,226
2021	571	1,732

== Logo and seal ==
Its logo contains a blue sky with its setting sun with a forested mountain and hills and foothills. In the middle is the river Arda written in the Greek alphabet, also a swan and two fishes are in the water which is mainly its reservoir. Its rim is coloured yellow and reflects the colour gold. Its Greek form of the municipality is at the bottom along with the Delta-Kappa letter and the founding year. The Greek word for welcome (Kalos Irthate) is at the bottom as well.

== History ==
The villages of and around Kyprinos are assumed to have been there for many centuries and what can certainly be said is that in the documents of the late 18th century found in different archives, both Greek and Turkish, Kyprinos itself and most of the nearby villages are already mentioned. Even though it is not clear when the first ones were founded since historical sources are rare and barely explicit.

However, there is evidence that in the Ancient world there already were settlements in that area. Excavations near the village of Mikri Doxipara - Zoni have brought interesting pieces of ancient Thracian culture (Thrace) into the light. The Tombs found in that place (8 km from Kyprinos, between Zoni and Mikri Doxipara) are estimated to be from the 1st or 2nd century AD.

Sheikh Bedreddin (1359–1420), also known as Sheikh Bedreddin, was born in Kyprinos, son of a local g(h)azi (warrior), whose name was Israel. He was a famous Sufi teacher and a rebel against the Ottoman central rule.

The modern municipality was founded in 1998.

== The river of Ardas ==
The river of Ardas, after a distance of 216 km from its original source in the mountains of Rhodope enters the Kyprinos territory on the border to Bulgaria close to the village of Galini and reaches from there to the river Evros (Maritsa), flowing along Kyprinos and Filakio. The Ardas river composes an important ecosystem for that area and its forest which is growing corresponding to its river bed. It is a biotope of crucial importance on a regional as well as on a national level.

There is a reservoir dam, the Kyprinos Dam, built in 1969 approximately 8 km from Kyprinos of 350 meters width providing resident farmers with water.

== City-Partnership ==
Kyprinos is the Partner-City of Bulgarian Ivaylovgrad
