= Pehlivanoğlu =

Pehlivanoğlu is a Turkish patronymic surname, meaning "wrestler's son". As of 2014, there are 4,845 people with the surname Pehlivanoğlu in Turkey, making it the 1,996th most common surname in the country.

People with named Pehlivanoğlu include:

- Cavit Şadi Pehlivanoğlu, Turkish politician and member of the Grand National Assembly
- Mustafa Pehlivanoğlu, Turkish mass shooter
- Özdemir Pehlivanoğlu, Turkish former politician

== See also ==
- Pehlivan, another Turkish surname with a similar etymology
- Ali Pehlivanoğlu, Turkish grocery store chain
