= Ammovouno =

Village in Greece

Ammovouno Αμμόβουνο
- Settlement
- Location within Greece
- Coordinates: 41°34′N 26°17′E
- Country: Greece
- Administrative region: East Macedonia and Thrace
- Regional unit: Evros
- Municipality: Orestiada
- Municipal unit: Kyprinos
- Community: Fylakio

Population (2021)
  - Total: 79
- Time zone: UTC+2 (EET)
  - Summer (DST): UTC+3 (EEST)
- Vehicle registration: EB

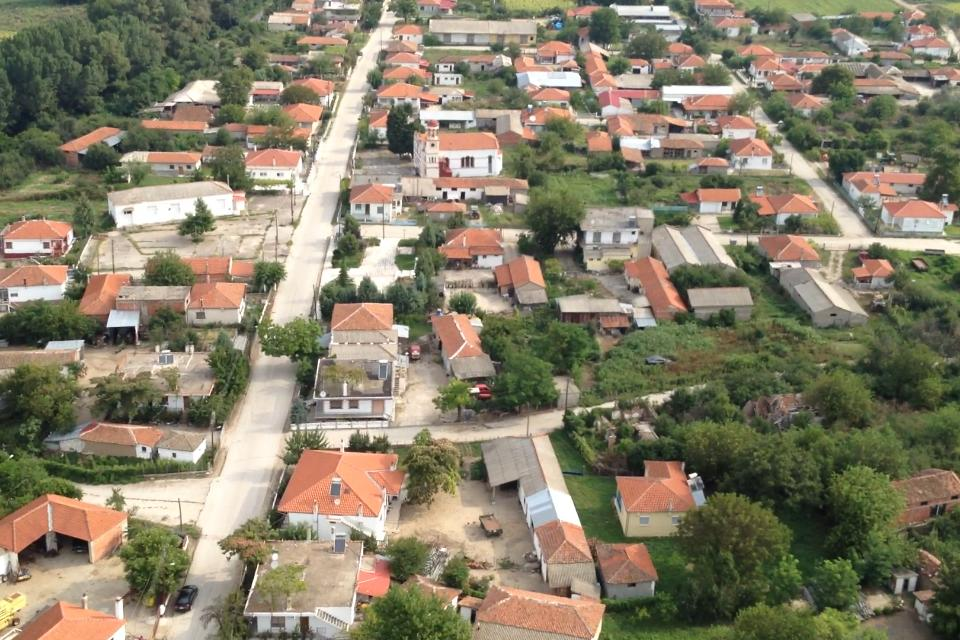

Ammovouno (Greek: Αμμόβουνο) is a village in the Evros regional unit of northeastern Greece. Ammovouno is part of the community of Fylakio within the municipality of Orestiada and is located on the right bank of the river Ardas. In 2021 the village had a population of 79.

== History ==
Prior to 1920 the village was called Samona.
