= Kırkpınar =

Turkish oil wrestling tournament

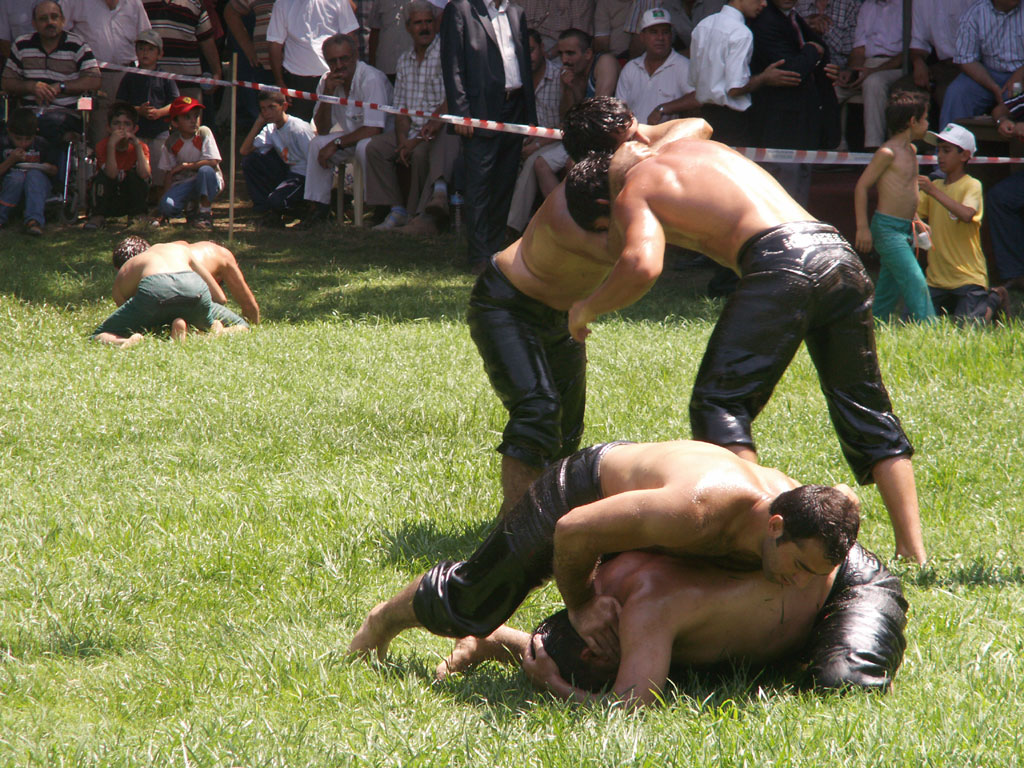
- Oil wrestling tournament in Istanbul
- Genre: Tournament
- Date: Late June
- Frequency: Annual
- Locations: Edirne, Turkey
- Inaugurated: 1360

Kırkpınar oil wrestling festival
- UNESCO Intangible Cultural Heritage
- Country: Turkey
- Reference: 00386
- Region: Europe and North America

Inscription history
- Inscription: 2010 (5th session)
- List: Representative

Kırkpınar (Turkish for "forty springs") is a Turkish oil wrestling (yağlı güreş) tournament where pehlivans (wrestlers) compete for three days. It is held annually, usually in late June, near Edirne, Turkey since 1360. In the finals held on the last day, the first, second and third winners of each category are determined. During the tournament, also the Kırkpınar Festival is organized.

Oil wrestling is a sport at the forefront of traditional Turkish sports. Wrestling was held in all of the fairs organized all over the Ottoman Empire, but the wrestler who won the "chief" title only in Kırkpınar was known as the "chief wrestler" until the next year's Kırkpınar wrestling. This idea continues to this day.

== Description ==
The contestants wear only leather knee-length shorts called kıspets. Before each bout, the wrestlers pour olive oil over their entire bodies.

Kırkpınar holds the Guinness World Record for the longest-running athletic competition.

== History ==
=== Oldest known evidence ===
The history of oil wrestling links back to 2650 BC with evidence from Ancient Egypt, Assyria, and other regions in the Middle East. The Babylonian body of evidence, a tiny bronze, was excavated near the Chafadji-temple. The bronze clearly concerns oil wrestlers as both athletes are depicted with olive vessels on their heads.

The oldest-known proof of the existence of oil-wrestling in Ancient Egypt is found in limestone from the tomb of Ptahhoteb near Saqqara from the Fifth dynasty (about 2650 BC) from the same period as the Chafadji-bronze.

Another appealing proof is about 4000 years old and painted like a cartoon in a tomb near Beni Hasan in Egypt. The deceased, who occupied this tomb, is assumed to have been a famous oil-wrestler in his time. In the first picture, the greasing of the wrestler and the oil stored in a reed stem is seen. In the second picture the wrestling starts. The last picture down shows the three step triumph of oiled wrestling, which is unchanged to this day. From this, the basic rules of the sport can be traced.

Centuries later, the Persian Empire conquered Egypt, and the Persian shah occupied the Pharaoh's throne. It was during this period that oil wrestling began in Iran.

=== Oil-wrestling in Iran ===
The history of the oil-wrestling tournaments as they are known today dates to the Persian Mythical Era, which, according to Ferdowsi's Shahnameh, started in 1065 BC. The legendary pehlivan of this era is called Rostam, a hero depicted to constantly save his country from evil forces.

The ceremonial start of oil-wrestling, called by its Persian name "Peshrev" has clear links with old Iranian institutes as the Zurkhane, literally "house of strength". The building consists of a court, around which the men who will perform, arrange themselves, and a gallery for the ostad ("master") or morshed (spiritual leader) and the musicians. Nowadays, the musical accompaniment consists of a drum and recitation of portions of Ferdowsi's Shahname. Various rhythms are employed, and a variety of movements associated with them, including displays of strength in manipulating heavy objects (such as weights and chains) and acrobatics.

Here the origin of the peshrev is found, considered by some to be preparation and a ceremony to greet the audience, to others a participatory form of dance. It is different from the usual step-right, step-left, step-right, kick-left, step-left, kick-right dance encountered in the rest of the region.

=== Greco-Roman Oil-wrestling ===
The word "Pehlivan" for a wrestler was first used in this period, when the Parthians (238 BC - 224 AD) expelled the Greeks from Iran.

=== Huns ===
The Huns arrived on the fringes of the Roman Empire in the late 4th century, moved on horseback out of the steppes of Central Asia into Germany and France. As they approached the Black Sea and conquered the Ostrogoths, they also drove the Visigoths across the Danube into the Roman Empire, causing the crisis that led to the astounding defeat of the Roman army under the Emperor Valens near Adrianople (Edirne) in 378 AD.

The Huns were fanatic wrestlers as well as horsemen. After securing a strong position on the Roman side of the Danube, the Huns were checked by the Roman army of general Aspar in Thrace (442).

In 447, Pehlivan Attila came again into Thrace and stopped only when Emperor Thodosius II begged for terms. During the negotiations, a Roman-Hun wrestling competition was held in Thermopylae. The dispute was settled by a wrestling match and winner Attila accepted payment of all tribute in arrears and a new annual tribute of 2,100 pounds of gold and territory south of the Danube.

Three years later Emperor Theodosius died falling from his horse. His successor, Marcian (450-457), refused to pay Attila. The Huns did not retaliate, because the sister of the Roman Emperor Valentinian III, Honoria, sent to him her ring and a message to the King of the Huns and asked Attila to become her champion. Attila agreed to this marriage proposal. When the sister of the Roman Emperor was imprisoned, Attila decided to take care of her dowry. As Honoria was not available, next year Attila took a new, young bride named Ildico. The wedding day was spent with one of the greatest wrestling matches of this time.

=== Oil-wrestling for Sultan and Shah ===
During the period when Islam was brought into Asia Minor, spirituality and philosophy became part of the physical garment of the pehlivan. Oil-wrestling was established as a sport on its own. In Iran and the Ottoman Empire alike, wrestling became the national sport. In Iran, wrestling grew to the customary institution of the Zurkhane strong house, where people went to socialise and engage in athletic exercise. The wrestler is the strong-man in popular culture (in Persian the term is "big neck"), but he is also the pahlavan, the knightly hero, who is a free-living spirit and is generous and loyal.

The year 1360 is adopted by the organizers of the Edirne Kırkpınar as the date when Ottoman soldiers started to organize annual oil-wrestling tournaments in Kırkpınar, a wrestling field "within the samona village". According to the Guinness Book of World Records, this legend made Kırkpınar the world's oldest continuously sanctioned sporting competition.

Once, the last bout between the two finalists was said to last through the night as neither was able to defeat the other. They were found dead the next morning, their bodies still intertwined. They were buried underneath a nearby fig tree, whereupon their comrades headed to conquer Edirne.

After the conquest, the soldiers came upon another fig tree, surrounded by a crystal-clear spring, so they renamed the surrounding meadow (which until then had been known as Ahirköy) Kırkpınar, which translates from Turkish as "forty springs" or "forty sources". To commemorate the heroism of the conquering warriors, a wrestling tournament is re-enacted annually at this site.

In all tales, myths, and stories, there has always been a common respect for the oil-wrestlers. The pehlivan is described as being stronger than anybody, having a well built body, and clothed in heavy leather pants. From the past until now, the wrestlers have poured olive oil onto their bodies. In addition, it is still possible to see younger wrestlers kissing the hands of older athletes despite having defeated them, which is a gesture of respect.

According to historian Burhan Katia, the word pehlivan was also used for an officer, governor or huge and honest person. From the 16th century on, the term was exclusively used in the Ottoman Empire for the wrestler.

In 1590, a peace treaty was signed between Murat III and the Persian Shah. The model of the wrestling pants go back to this period. The design is still same for the Iranian "pahlivan" and the Turkish "pehlivan", except the Turkish wrestling pants are made of leather and are called "kispet", while the Iranian pahlivan wears a "pirpet", made of silk.

Famous wrestlers from Iran came to Istanbul to compete with the Ottoman champions, and the Turkish champions were invited to Persia to show their strength.

=== Collecting strong men ===
Before 1582, all wrestlers were obtained from prisoners of war, the Devşirme, or other slave sources. With the Devşirme system, the healthiest and strongest young men were recruited from the various provinces of the Ottoman Empire, and pehlivans trained from Devşirme boys were always known to be free enough to be honest, and throughout history trusted for their word and behaviour.

Wrestling championships were held everywhere in the Ottoman Empire. Every city and village had its annual wrestling event, like the one organized in Edirne today. Wrestling occurred in a variety of contexts, including social and ceremonial events. There were wrestling events on religious festival days, during special evenings of the Muslim fasting-month of Ramadan, on agricultural events, circumcisions and weddings. On special occasions, charity wrestling competitions were organized outside the palaces. Only the best wrestlers were accepted in training to become members of the elite Janissary Corps.

=== Oil-wrestling for French Impératrice Eugenie ===
When the Ottoman sultan visited France in 1867, oil-wrestlers were part of his entourage and Impératrice Eugenie visited the wrestling-tournament. Wrestling was a tough sport, but oil-wrestling was even harder. It was considered the most difficult sport in the world.

=== Virantekke ===
After the Balkan War of 1912, the event's original Kırkpınar location was lost, so the tournament was relocated to Virantekke, now the Kapitan Andreevo checkpoint on the Bulgarian border.

=== Edirne ===
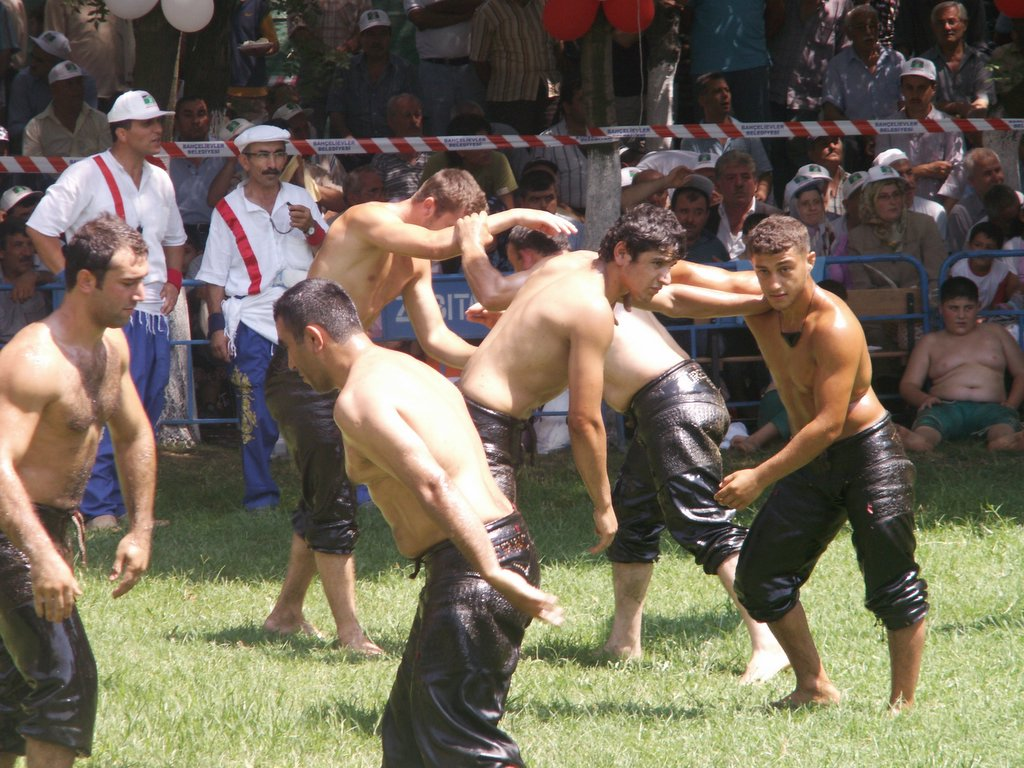
Oil wrestling scene from Turkey

After 12 years, the annual oil-wrestling competition of Kırkpınar moved to yet another location. Since 1924, bouts are held on the Sarayiçi island near Edirne.

The last Ottoman sultan was exiled to Malta. In what remained of the Empire, almost everything traditional was replaced or westernized. The language was "purified" by replacing words of Persian or Arabic origin with words derived from Turkic roots. Even a sport prevailing any western sport was at stake. Atatürk thought of putting the wrestling organizations directly under his own sponsorship. He ordered Selim Sırrı Tarcan (1874–1956) to restyle oil-wrestling according to his guidelines for sport in the new Turkish Republic.

As a result, the winner of the Edirne competition was no longer "Başpehlivan of the Kırkpınar" but "Champion of Turkey". Instead of traditional prizes such as the "Altın Kemer" (Golden Belt) and horses, donkeys, or camels; medals similar to those in the Western world began to be awarded.

It was feared that with such a change of reward "because they did so in Europe" effect a lack of participation by the pehlivans. The officer responsible for sports in the new republic had to come to a compromise, allowing the winning wrestler in the highest category to be awarded the title of "Başpehlivan of the Year", and rewards of whichever animals the organizers could obtain. Selim Sırrı Tarcan also restricted the Golden Belt: It could only be awarded for the Edirne Kırkpınar, and only to a "Turkish Champion" who had won the event for three consecutive years. The weight of the Belt was limited to 1450g of 14-carat gold.

The Kırkpınar wrestling competitions of Edirne were still held under the protectorate of the "Agha". The Agha welcomed his guests and accommodated them in the hotel, held dinners, and organized festivities. Also, he awarded the prizes to the winners in their categories. Just before the final of the Kırkpınar, the organizing Agha held an auction. The bids were placed on a ram or sheep. The highest bidder became the "agha" of the next year's Kırkpınar and the main sponsor of the event.

When in 1928 an economic depression hit Turkey and no agha could be found, Selim Sırrı Tarcan made the Turkish Red Crescent (Kızılay) and the Institute of Child Care (Çocuk Esirgeme Kurumu) responsible for the organization and hosting of the guests.

In the olden days of the event, an agha was able to stop a match, disqualify wrestlers if necessary, and even cancel the wrestling events altogether. Today, the organizing committee makes such decisions. The Red Crescent and the Institute of Child Care would organize the Edirne Kırkpınar for 36 years, after which the task of organizing the event was assigned to the municipality of Edirne.

=== Edirne Kırkpınar municipality service ===
In 1964, the mayor of Edirne, Tahsin Sipka, signed an act making the Edirne Municipality responsible for the organization of the Edirne Kırkpınar. That same year, Mayor Sipka made the Edirne Kırkpınar a municipal service.

During a year, about 300 different oil-wrestling games are held in Turkey. They host an average of ten million spectators.

=== Introduction of time ===
Until 1975, there was no time-limit for wrestling in Kırkpınar. The pehlivans would sometimes wrestle one or two days, until they could establish superiority over their foes. Wrestling games would last from 9am until dusk and matches without a winner would continue the next day. After 1975, wrestling was limited to 40 minutes in the başpehlivan category. If there is no winner within these limits, the pehlivans wrestle for 15 more minutes with scores recorded. Those who score the most points in this last period are accepted as the winners. In other categories, the wrestling time is limited to 30 minutes. If there is no winner, ten minutes of scored wrestling follows.

=== Federation ===
On 20 June 1996, the Turkish Federation of Traditional Sport Branches (Geleneksel Spor Dallari Federasyonu) was founded by the Turkish Ministry. Riding, oil-wrestling, aba-wrestling and other traditional sports were assembled in the same federation under Alper Yazoğlu.

=== Oil-wrestling inroads in Amsterdam ===
During the 636th annual Kırkpınar of Edirne, Agha (mc) Hüseyin Sahin agreed with Veyis Güngör, the chairman of Türkevi Amsterdam, and Mohamed el-Fers (MokumTV Amsterdam) that they would unite their forces to promote traditional oil-wrestling in Europe and the world. For three days El-Fers filmed almost every match.

On 4 September 1996, MokumTV started a weekly program on the A1 Amsterdam channel, presenting this sport.

The late Hüseyin Sahin said during his speech, attended by Turkish president Süleyman Demirel, Edirne-mayor Hamdi Sedefçi, Veyis Güngör and Mohamed el-Fers that the Kırkpınar will exceed the borders of Turkey and unite the world.

The champion wrestlers, who attended that 636th Edirne Kırkpınar applauded the news of an Amsterdam Kırkpınar. In his speech at the award ceremony, President Süleyman Demirel said that Turkey would continue to raise world-famous wrestlers. Veyis Güngör told the press that the enthusiastic reactions in Europe proved that this traditional Turkish sport is not only everlasting, but thanks to television and video, is gaining popularity among non-Turkish people as well. In the days after the news was released, organisers received about 950 letters from oil-wrestlers throughout Turkey, who would enter competition for the title of Euro-champion of the Amsterdam Kırkpınar.

In 1997, the "Mother of All Sports" débuted in Western Europe, when the European Champions League was held in Amsterdam. No less than 22 television teams covered the event, and scenes from the Amsterdam Kırkpınar were shown on CNN and the BBC alike.

The 2nd European Oil-Wrestling Championship held in Amsterdam already had a final with 42 wrestlers from Turkey, the Netherlands and other European countries. The winner was Cengiz Elbeye, Edirne Kırkpınar oil-wrestling champion. During the opening ceremony, Erkut Onart, the Turkish Consul General in the Netherlands, said that he believed the friendship between Turkish society and the European countries is intensified when these kinds of cultural values are brought to Europe.

In the world of oil-wrestling, Amsterdam became the most important annual event, after Edirne.

=== Special branch ===
Oil-wrestling was accepted as special branch by the Turkish Olympic Wrestling Federation. Sport and politics, as in 1996 the Turkish Federation of Traditional Sport Branches (Geleneksel Spor Dallari Federasyonu) was officially accepted as the federation representing oil-wrestling and other traditional Turkish sports.

=== Anti-doping control ===
In 1999, anti-doping checks were introduced by the Turkish Olympic Wrestling Federation during the Edirne Kırkpınar.

=== Foreign oil-wrestler rejected in Edirne ===
Oil-wrestling is a growing sport, not limited to Turkey. However, it is difficult for foreign wrestlers to enter this National Turkish Championship. In 2000, Dutch oil-wrestler Melvin Witteveen's entry in Edirne was rejected.

The event attracted little attention outside of Turkey until the 1990s, when the style of wrestling began to spread to Western Europe. It has become particularly popular in the Netherlands, which now hosts its own annual version of the tournament, attracting participants from throughout Europe. Yağlı güreş wrestling matches are also held in Japan.

== Most wins ==
Hüseyin Pehlivan won the event 7 consecutive years, starting 1935. Ahmet Taşçı won the event 9 times in 11 years. The 2021 event was won by Ali Gürbüz, his 4th victory.

== See also ==
- Wrestling in Turkey
