= Kurash =

Folk wrestling styles practiced in Central Asia

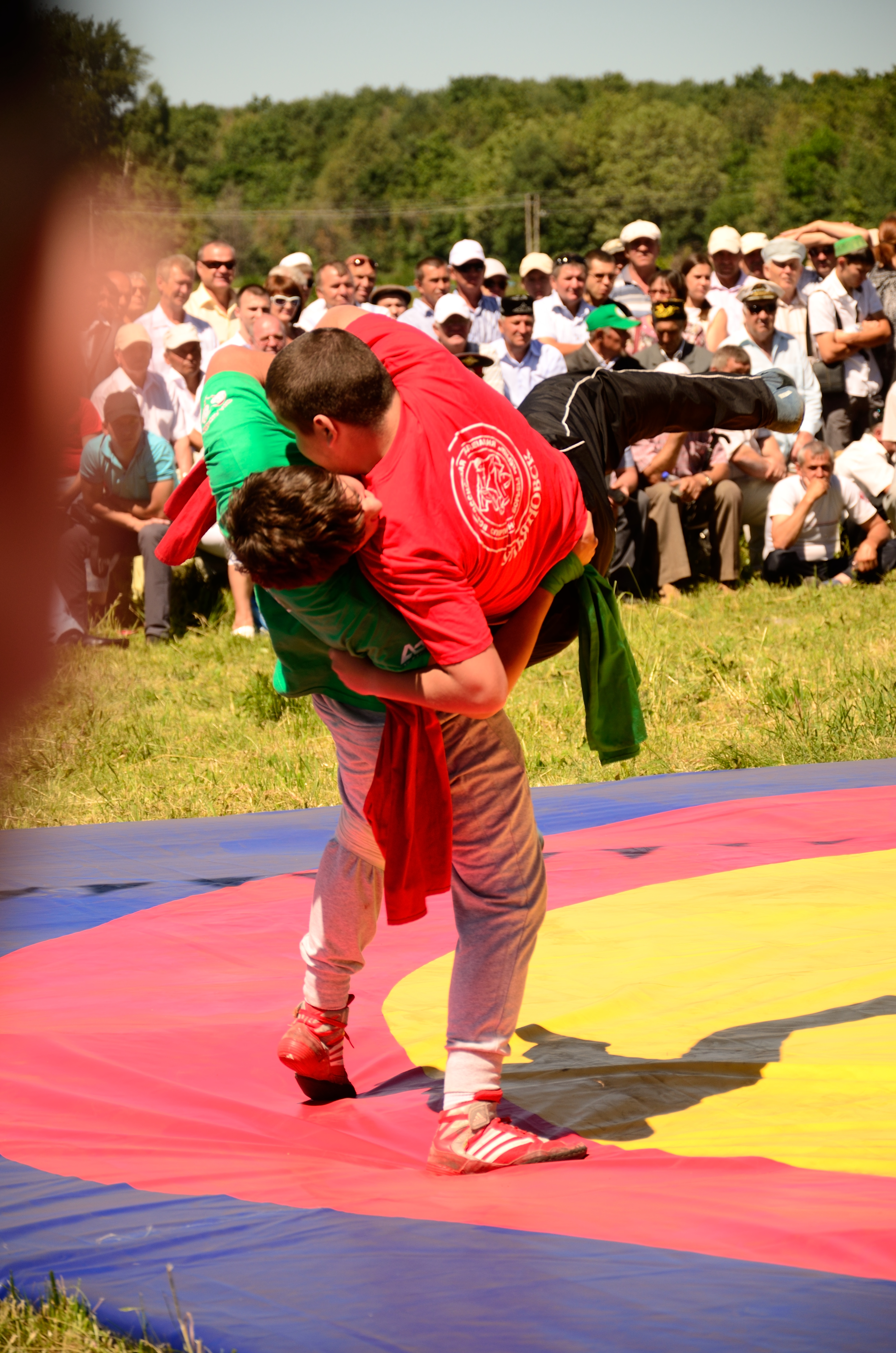
Kurash on a Sabantuy

Köräş (also kuresh, koresh, küreş, güreş, göreş and similar variants) refers to a number of folk wrestling styles practiced in Central Asia.

Köräş wrestlers (Turkish: Güreş, Tatar: köräşçelär; Altay: кӱрешчилер, küreščiler) use towels to hold their opponents, and their goal is to throw their opponents off the feet. The wrestling is the main competition at the folk festival Sabantuy.

The sport is called گولش / ҝүләш / güləş in Azerbaijani, көрәш in Bashkir, кӗрешӳ in Chuvash, күрес / küres in Kazakh, күрөш / küröş in Kyrgyz, кӱреш / küreş in Shor, küreş / күреш / көрәш / kөrəş in Tatar, güreş in Turkish, göreş in Turkmen, and kurash in Uzbek, all derived from Old Turkic küreş.

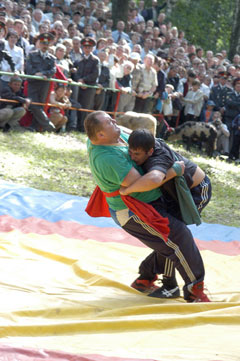
Tatar-style wrestling, "Köräş"

== History ==
The first official All-USSR koresh championship took place in Kazan in 1928 and was followed by the first TASSR (Tatar Autonomous Soviet Socialist Republic) national championship in 1949. Since 1956, regular Tatar Köräş competitions have been organized in honor of the national hero and poet Musa Cälil.

At the turn of 1950 and 1960, the Soviet Federation of freestyle wrestling, Greco-Roman wrestling, and sambo started to develop Tatar Köräş. Sportsmen from the neighbour regions, such as Bashkortostan, Mordovia, and Ulyanovsk City came to compete in Kazan for the first time in 1959. In 1960, the capital of Tatarstan was appointed host of the first RSFSR (Russian Soviet Federative Socialist Republic) national koresh championship, an event that has been repeated every year since that date. It was organized in Kazan about 15 times, but also in other cities, such as Salavat, Orenburg, Oktyabrsky, Tuymazy, Chelyabinsk, Cheboksary, Almetievsk, Samara, Ulyanovsk, Naberezhnye Chelny. Sportsmen from 36 Russian regions have participated in the Russian championships over the past years.

== Events ==
The International Kurash Association (IKA), founded in 1998, holds championships since 1999. World Senior championships were held in Tashkent (Uzbekistan) in 1999, in Antalya (Turkey) in 2000, in Budapest (Hungary) in 2001, in Yerevan (Armenia) in 2002, in Tashkent (Uzbekistan) in 2005, in Ulaanbaatar (Mongolia) in 2007, in Alushta (Ukraine) in 2009, in Termez (Uzbekistan) in 2011, in Istanbul (Turkey) in 2013, and in Khorramabad (Iran) in 2015. The XI World Senior Championships will be held in Istanbul (Turkey) in 2017.

The International Tatar Belt Wrestling Köräş Association was founded on 9 September 2009 with the aim of popularizing Tatar traditions abroad and offer Continental and World opportunities to all sportsmen wishing to compete in Tatar Köräş. It became a member of FILA's World Traditional Wrestling Committee in 2009 and held its second World Championship during the FILA World Wrestling Games that took place in Šiauliai (LTU) in September 2009. The third World Championship was held in Kazan in May 2010 and attracted a participation of about 100 wrestlers from 17 countries.

Kurash made its debut at the 2018 Asian Games which was held in Jakarta and Palembang, Indonesia. It also made its debut at the 30th Southeast Asian Games hosted by the Philippines in 2019.

=== World Kurash Championships ===
Edition	Year	Host city	Country	Events	Ref
1	1999	Tashkent	Uzbekistan	3	
2	2000	Antalya	Turkey	4	
3	2001	Budapest	Hungary	2	
4	2002	Yerevan	Armenia	7	
5	2005	Tashkent	Uzbekistan	13	
6	2007	Ulaanbaatar	Mongolia	11	
7	2009	Alushta	Ukraine	14	
8	2011	Termez	Uzbekistan	14	
9	2013	Istanbul	Turkey	15	
10	2015	Khorramabad	Iran	8	
11	2017	Istanbul	Turkey	15	
12	2019	Chungju	South Korea	15	
14	2023	Ashgabat	Turkmenistan	15	

=== World Junior Kurash Championships (U20) ===
Edition	Year	Host city	Country	Events	Ref
1	2000	Tver	Russia		
3	2004	Shahrisabz	Uzbekistan	9	
4	2006	Santo Domingo	Dominican Republic	9	
6	2010	New Delhi	India	14	
7	2012	Bournemouth	United Kingdom	7	
8	2016	Kochi	India	13	

== Kurash rules ==
Contestants attempt to score (and finish the match) with high amplitude throws. The trousers or legs may not be grabbed.

There are three scoring points viz. Halal, Yonbosh and Chala. The player who scores a Halal wins the fight. To score a Halal you need to throw your opponent on his back with full control, force and speed. The throw that is close to Halal is given Yonbosh. Two Yonbosh throws make a Halal. The throw that is close to Yonbosh is called Chala. No number of Chala can equal a Yonbosh. There are three penalties in Kurash. The first penalty is called Tanbekh, second penalty is Dakki and the third penalty is Gʻirrom which means disqualification. The fight starts with salutation which is called Ta'zim. And to pause the bout Tokhta is used and to cancel a point Bekar is used.

== See also ==
- Alysh
- Mongolian wrestling
- Wrestling in Turkey
- Yağlı güreş
- Karakucak
- Ssireum
- Sumo
- Sambo
- Zoorkhaneh
