= Wrestling in Turkey =

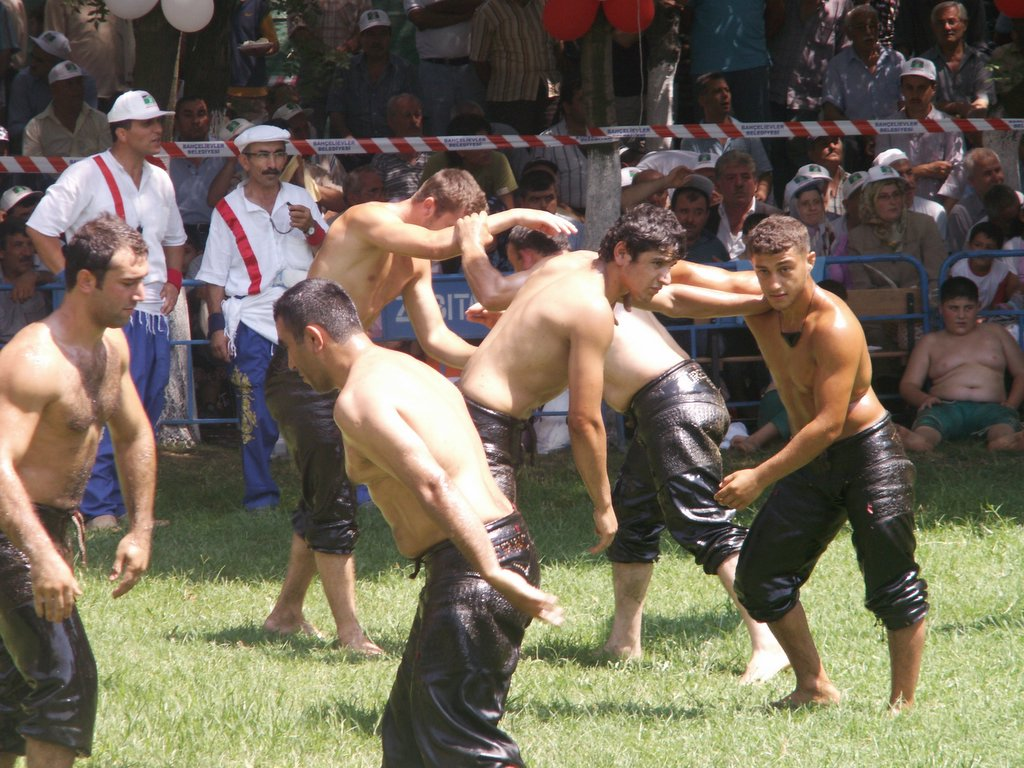
Traditional Oil Wrestling in Turkey is a UNESCCO listed Intangible Cultural Heritage

Wrestling (Turkish: güreş) is considered as an "ancestral sport" in Turkey, represented foremost by the annual Kırkpınar tournament in oil wrestling.

Along with various highly esteemed styles of folk wrestling (known colloquially as çayır güreşi, or "meadow wrestling", because bouts are held on grass fields), olympic wrestling (known colloquially as minder güreşi, or "mat wrestling") is widely practiced, while Greco-Roman wrestling is less popular due to freestyle wrestling's technical affinity with folk wrestling.

Turkey currently has only one professional wrestling promotion, Turkish Power Wrestling founded in 2010.

== Turkish folk wrestling styles ==
- Styles practised nationwide (sanctioned by the Turkish Wrestling Federation):
1. Karakucak Güreşi
2. Oil wrestling (Turkish: Yağlı Güreş)
- Styles practised locally (sanctioned by the Turkey Traditional Sport Branches Federation):
1. Aba Güreşi (jacket wrestling) (in Hatay)
2. Aşırtmalı Aba Güreşi (belt wrestling) (in Gaziantep, Adana, Osmaniye)
3. Kısa Şalvar Güreşi (in Kahramanmaraş)
4. Kuşak Güreşi or Tatar Güreşi
5. Kar üstü Karakucak Güreşi
6. Şalvar Güreşi
7. Torun Abası
8. Siyah Aba
9. Boz Aba
10. Kırmızı Aba
11. Maraş Abası
12. Urfa Abası
13. Çuha Abası
14. Hamis Abası

== Sport wrestling ==
FILA Wrestling World Championships were held in Turkey in 1957, 1974, 1994, 1999 and 2011. The Turkish team won the Men's freestyle championship in 1951, 1954, 1957, 1966 and 1994; and the Men's Greco-Roman championship in 2006 and 2009.

== Events ==
- 27th U17 Victory Cup & U20 Champions Cup Tournament May 2025 - Since 1999 (or 1997) 2020 and 2021 Not Held ?
- Yasar Dogu Tournament - Since 1973
- Vehbi Emre & Hamit Kaplan Tournament - Since 1983
