= Pehlivan =

Pehlivan or Pahlevan derives from Iranian language word meaning noble, wrestler, hero or champion and it is a loan word in many Asiatic languages as well as middle eastern languages including Turkish surname originally given to wrestlers. The name of Feyli (Pehli) Kurds is also deriving from the same root word. The word consist of two Iranic (Aryen) word "pehli" or "pahli" and "van, wan". While peh, pah is root word for hero "van" or "wan" is a suffix similar as in "er, or" in soldier, warrior, wrestler, shopper.

As of 2014, there are 47,462 people with the surname Pehlivan in Turkey, making it the 243rd most common surname in the country.

Notable people with this surname include:

- Barış Pehlivan (born 1983), Turkish journalist
- Ferhat Pehlivan (born 1988), Turkish boxer
- Halil Pehlivan (born 1994), Turkish footballer
- Kurtdereli Mehmet Pehlivan (1864–1939), Turkish wrestler
- Yasin Pehlivan (born 1989), Austrian–Turkish footballer

== See also ==
- Pehlivan (disambiguation)
- Pehlivanoğlu, another surname with a similar etymology
