= List of Bulgarian Turks =

This is a list of notable Turkish Bulgarians who were born in Bulgaria (during the Ottoman or post-Ottoman periods) as well as people of full or partial Turkish Bulgarian origin. In addition to notable Bulgarian citizens of Turkish origin, there are many notable Turkish Bulgarian individuals who either emigrated to, or were born in, Turkey and thus have Turkish citizenship.

== Academia and medicine ==
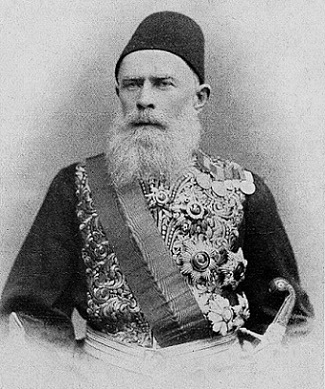
Ahmed Cevdet Pasha

- Ahmet Cevdet, Ottoman scholar, intellectual, bureaucrat, administrator, and historian
- İsmail Fenni Ertuğrul, Turkish philosopher (born in Ottoman Veliko Tarnovo)
- Tahsin Özgüç, Turkish archaeologist
- Nesrin Özören, Turkish biologist (born in Silistra)
- İsmail Hakkı Tonguç, Turkish General Director of Primary Education

== Activism ==
- Nuri Turgut Adalı, activist and writer also a prisoner of the Belene labour camp

== Arts and literature ==
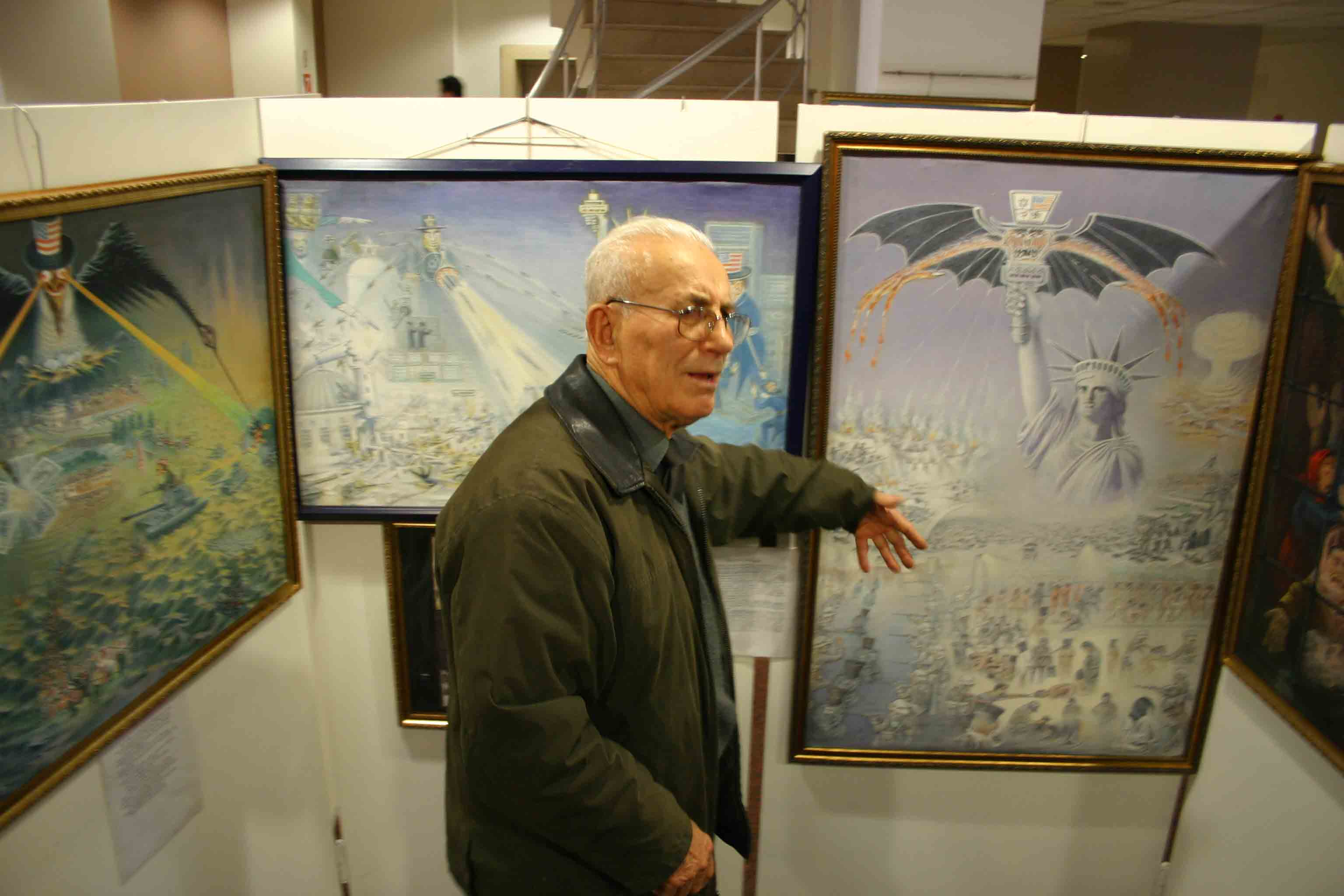
Embiya Çavuş

- Sabahattin Ali, Ottoman and Turkish writer, poet, journalist
- Ahmet Emin Atasoy, Turkish poet, author and interpreter (born in Targovishte)
- Kemal Kurt, Turkish-born German author, translator and photographer (Turkish Bulgarian origin)
- Recep Küpçü, poet
- Ertuğrul Özkök, Turkish journalist and a daily columnist (Turkish Bulgarian parents from Kardzhali)
- Sevda Shishmanova, producer, director and journalist

== Aviation ==
- Nezihe Viranyalı, one of the first Turkish female aviators (born in Vidin)

== Cinema and television ==
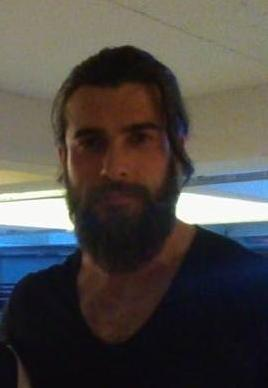
Cengiz Coşkun

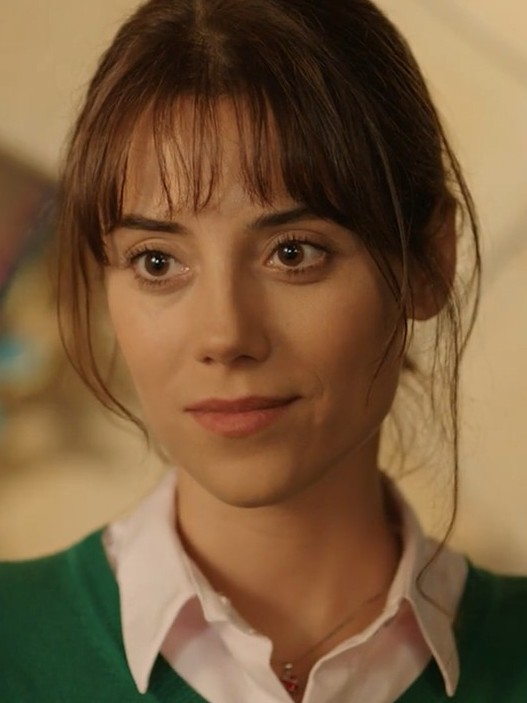
Cansu Dere

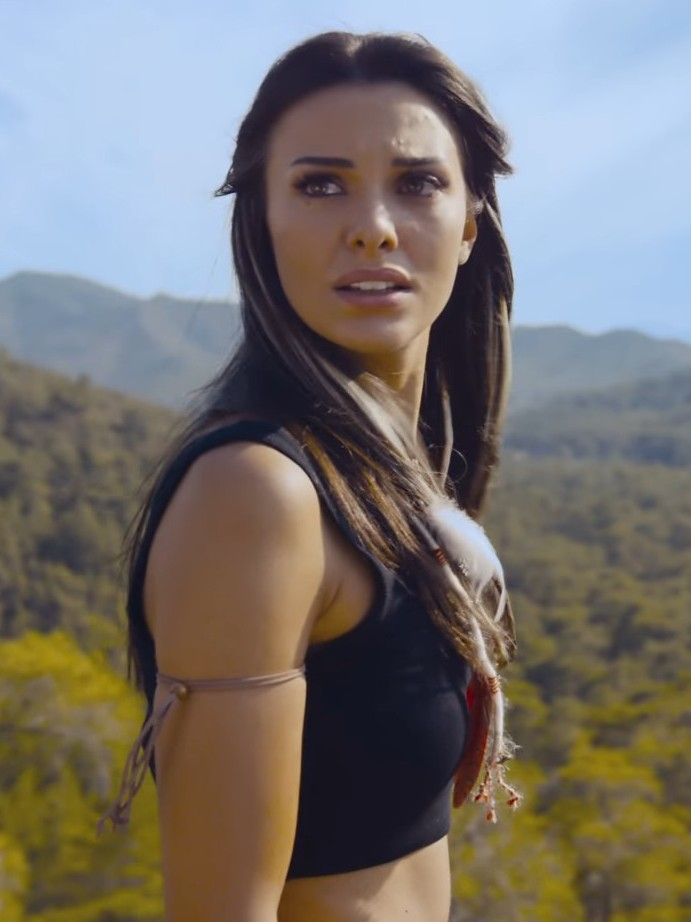
Tuvana Türkay

- Gülsim Ali, Turkish actress and model (born in Ruse)
- Zahari Baharov, actor
- Alina Boz, Russian-born actress (Turkish Bulgarian father)
- İbrahim Büyükak, Turkish actor (Turkish Bulgarian parents)
- Cengiz Coşkun, Turkish actor (Turkish Bulgarian parents)
- Cansu Dere, Turkish actress (Turkish Bulgarian parents)
- İlhan Şen, actor (born in Shumen)
- Tardu Flordun, Turkish actor (Turkish Bulgarian father)
- Ozan Güven, German-born actor (Turkish Bulgarian origin)
- İsmail Hacıoğlu, Turkish actor
- Bade İşçil, Turkish actress (partial Turkish Bulgarian origin)
- Hulusi Kentmen, Turkish actor (born in Veliko Tarnovo)
- Hülya Koçyiğit, Turkish actress (Turkish Bulgarian parents)
- Fikret Kuşkan, Turkish actor (Turkish Bulgarian mother)
- Şaziye Moral, Turkish female stage and film actress (born in Kardzhali)
- Demet Özdemir, Turkish actress, (Turkish Bulgarian origin)
- Yavuz Selekman, Turkish actor and Olympic wrestler (Turkish Bulgarian origin)
- Gülhan Şen, Turkish television presenter (born in Shumen)
- Tuğba Melis Türk, Turkish actress and model; winner of Best Model of Turkey (2011) (born in Sofia)
- Tuvana Türkay, Turkish actress (Turkish Bulgarian father)
- Çağatay Ulusoy, Turkish actor (Turkish Bulgarian father)
- Şoray Uzun, Turkish comedian, writer and television host (born in Razgrad)
- Alican Yücesoy, Turkish actor (Turkish Bulgarian mother)
- Deniz Celiloğlu, Turkish actor (born in Bulgaria, Turkish Bulgarian parents)

== Design ==
- Günay Erdem, Turkish architect (born in Shumen)
- Sunay Erdem, Turkish architect (born in Shumen)

== Food ==
- Silvena Rowe, British celebrity chef and food writer (Turkish Bulgarian father)

== Military ==
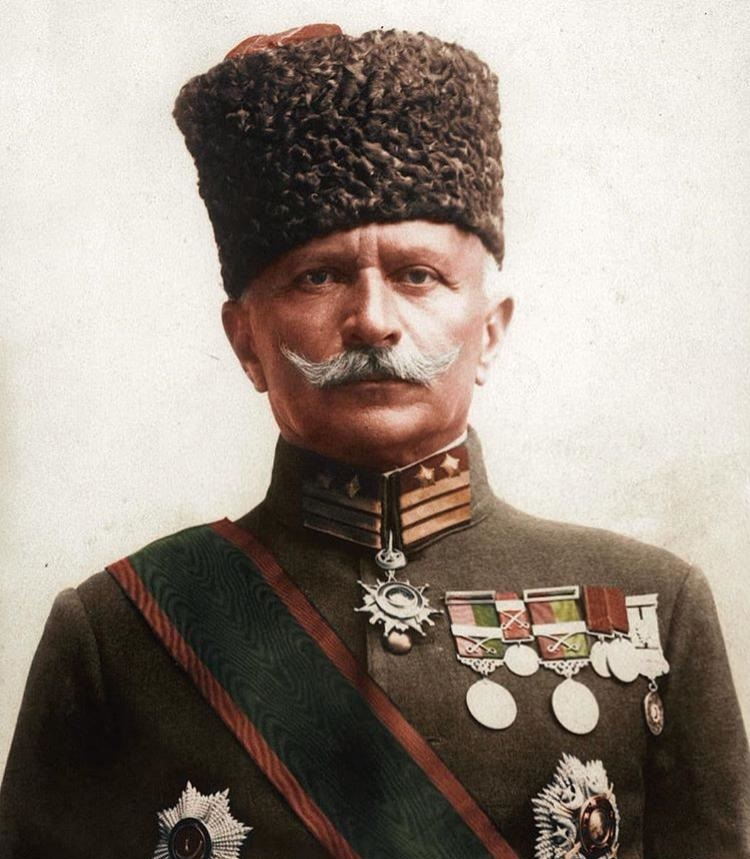
Fakhri Pasha

- Nihat Anılmış, officer of the Ottoman Army and a general of the Turkish Army (born in Plovdiv)
- Ahmet Nuri Diriker, Turkish Brigadier General who fought in the Gallipoli Campaign (born in Ruse)
- Abdülkerim Nadir Pasha, Ottoman military commander (born in Chirpan)
- Mehmet Hayri Tarhan, officer of the Ottoman Army and a general of the Turkish Army (born in Malko Tarnovo)
- Ömer Fahreddin Türkkan, Turkish career officer who was the commander of the Ottoman Army and governor of Medina from 1916 to 1919 (born in Ruse)

== Music ==
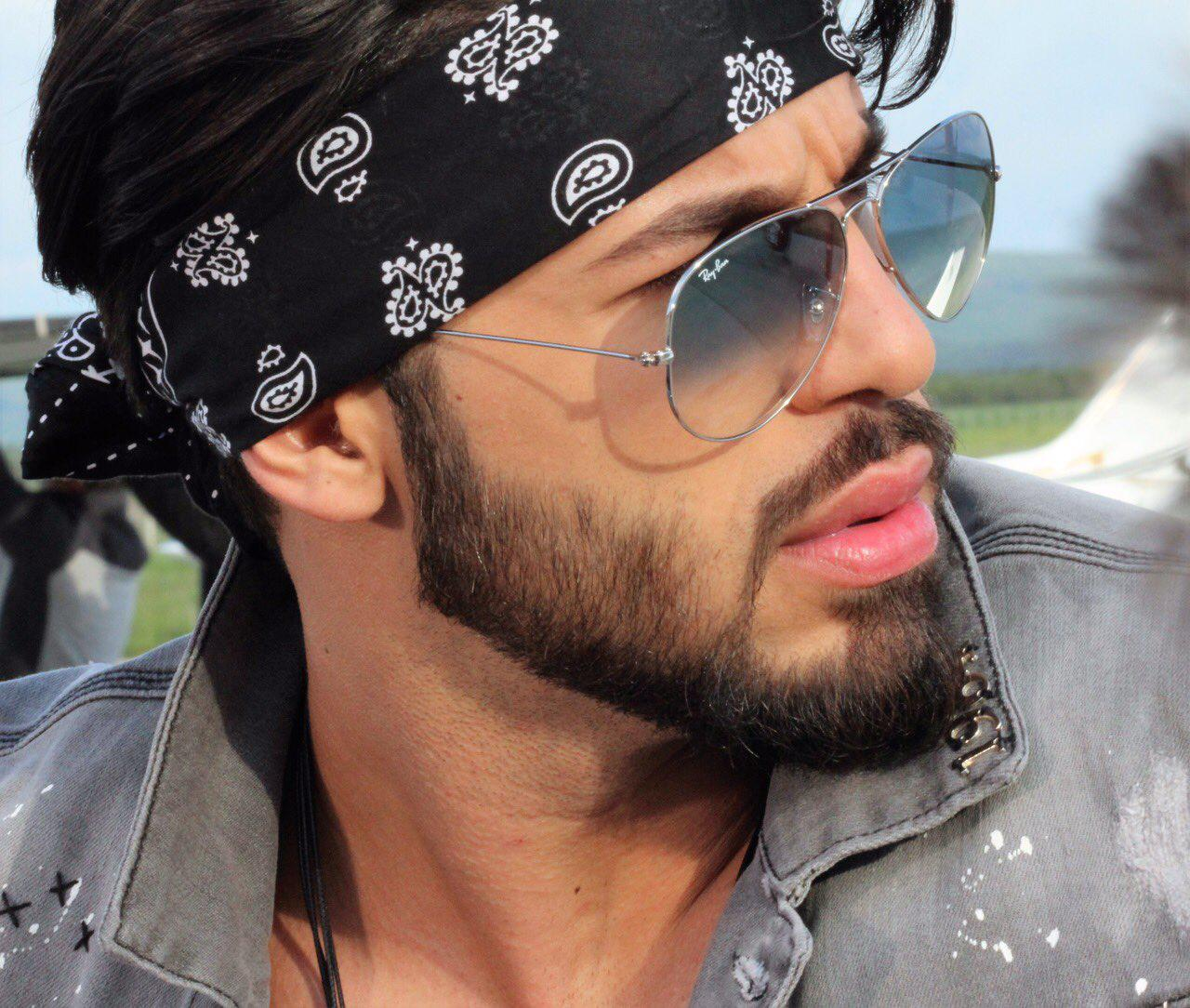
Fiki

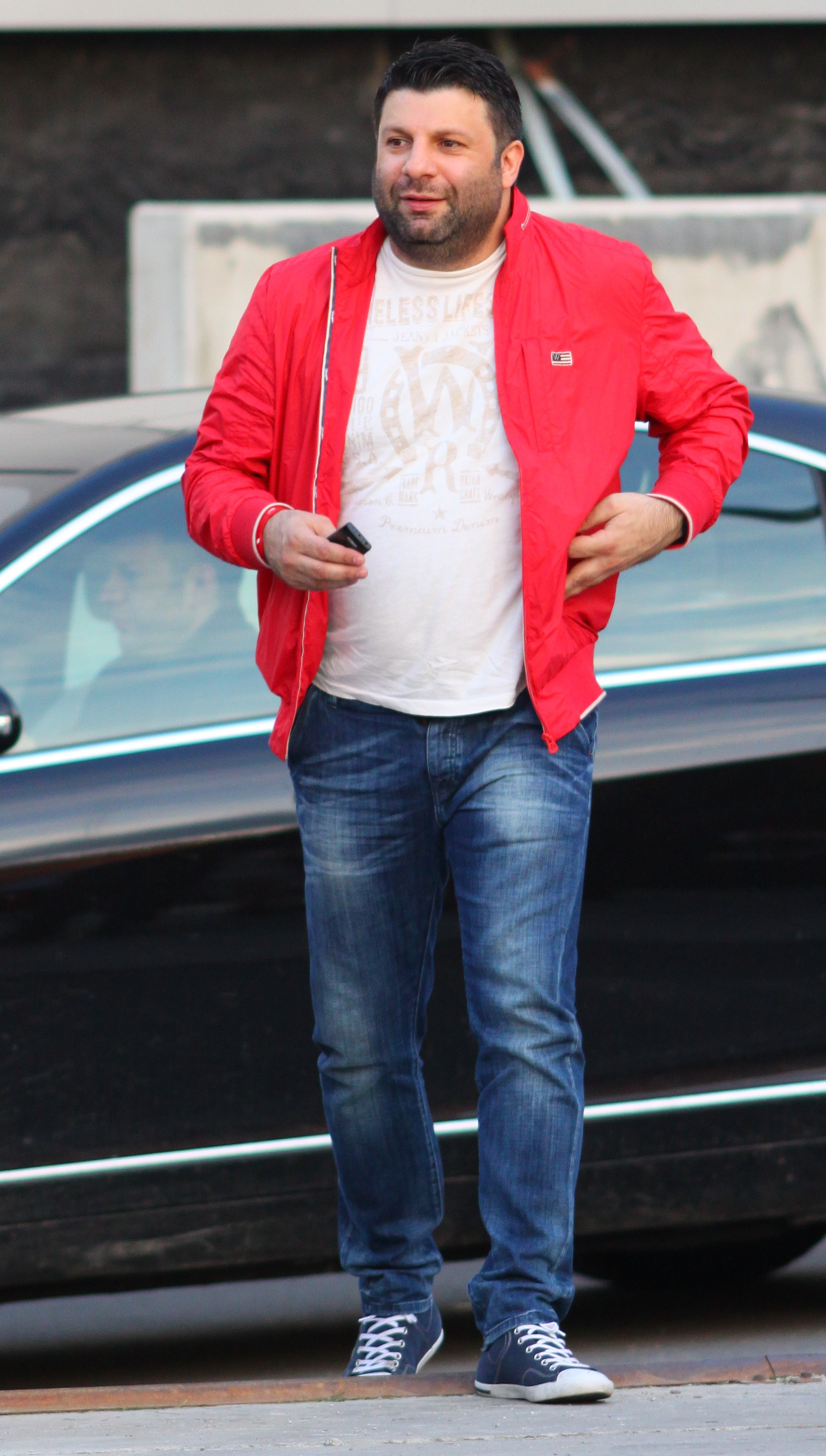
Toni Storaro

- Reyhan Angelova, singer
- Ciguli, Turkish musician (born in Haskovo)
- Fiki, pop-folk singer
- Yıldız İbrahimova, jazz musician and folk singer
- Hasan Ignatov, pianist (Turkish Bulgarian mother)
- Ibrahim Ignatov, pianist (Turkish Bulgarian mother)
- Orhan Murad, singer
- Toni Storaro, leading performer on the Bulgarian music label Diapason Records
- Suzanitta, chalga singer
- Derya Uluğ, Turkish actress (partial Turkish Bulgarian origin)
- Ebru Gündeş, Turkish singer (Turkish Bulgarian mother)
- Nazan Öncel, Turkish singer and songwriter (Turkish Bulgarian mother)

== Politics ==
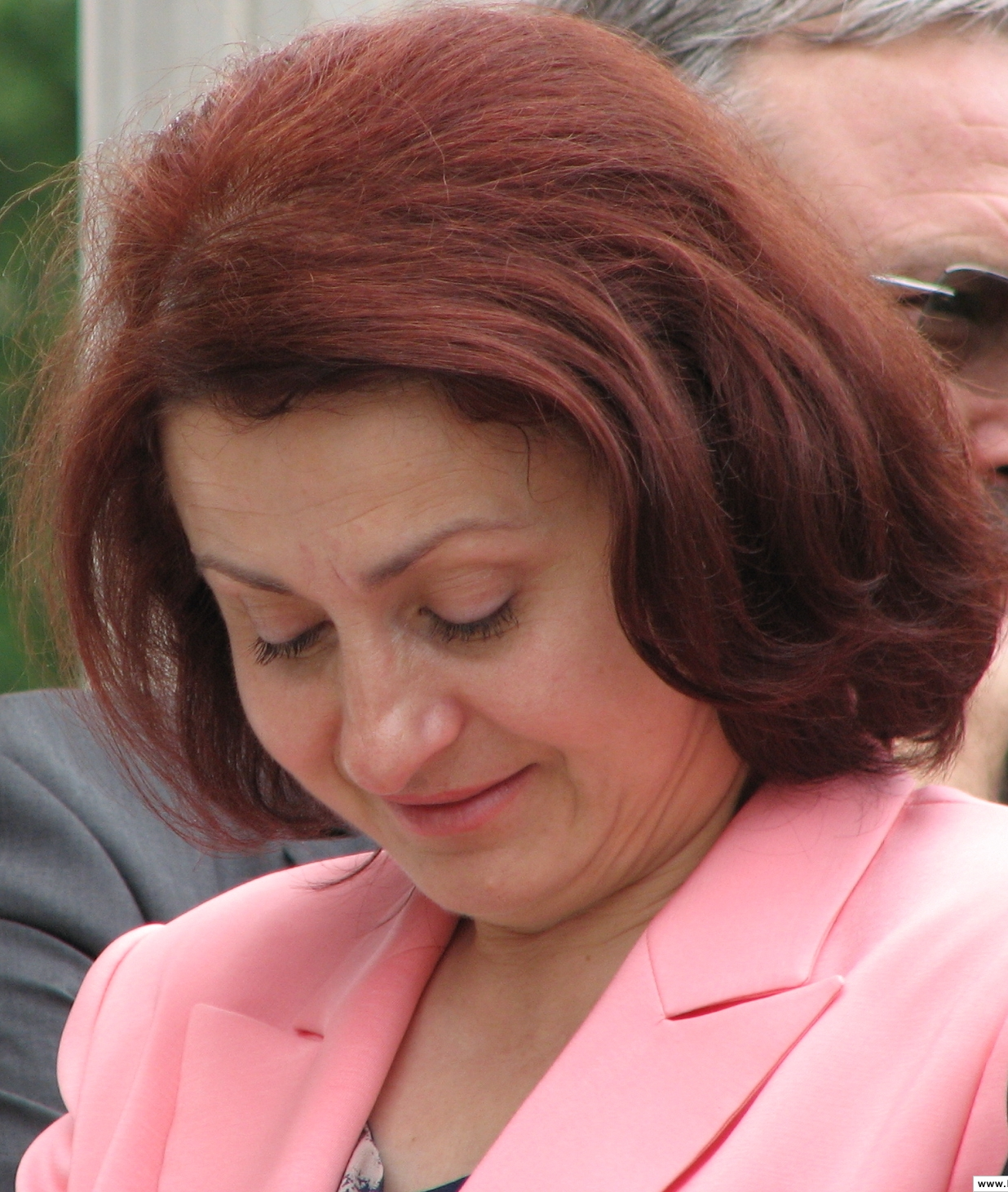
Emel Etem Toshkova

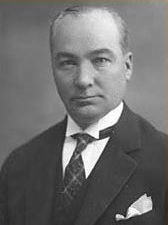
Ahmet Fikri Tüzer

- Hassan Ademov, member of the DPS party
- Nedzhmi Ali, member of the DPS party and an elected Member of the European Parliament
- Atidzhe Alieva-Veli, member of the DPS party and an elected Member of the European Parliament (2019–present)
- Celâl Bayar, 3rd Prime Minister of Turkey (1937–39) and 3rd President of Turkey (1950–60) (Turkish Bulgarian father from Lom Ottoman Bulgaria)
- Rıza Tevfik Bölükbaşı, Ottoman and Turkish philosopher, poet and politician
- Dzhevdet Chakarov, member of the DPS
- Ali Dinçer, Turkish politician; former Mayor of Ankara (1977–80) and Minister of State (1995–96) (born in Razgrad)
- Ahmed Dogan, chairman of the Movement for Rights and Freedoms party (1990–2013)
- Tunalı Hilmi, Ottoman and Turkish politician (born in Ottoman Targovishte)
- Filiz Husmenova, member of the DPS party and an elected Member of the European Parliament (2007–2019)
- İsmet İnönü, 1st Prime Minister of Turkey (1923–24; 1925–37; 1961–65) and 2nd President of Turkey (1938–1950) (Turkish Bulgarian mother from Razgrad)
- Mustafa Karadaya, chairman of the Movement for Rights and Freedoms
- Metin Kazak, member of the DPS party and an elected Member of the European Parliament (2007–14)
- Tchetin Kazak, member of the DPS party and an elected Member of the European Parliament (2007–present)
- Ilhan Kyuchyuk, President of the Youth Movement for Rights and Freedoms since 2005; elected Member of the European Parliament (2014-present)
- Emel Etem Toshkova, member of the DPS party; former deputy Prime Minister of Bulgaria (2005–09)
- Ahmet Fikri Tüzer, Turkish politician; Prime Minister of Turkey (1942) (born in Shumen)
- Vezhdi Rashidov, was a Minister of Culture of Bulgaria

== Religion ==
- Süleyman Hilmi Tunahan, Islamic theologist

== Sports ==
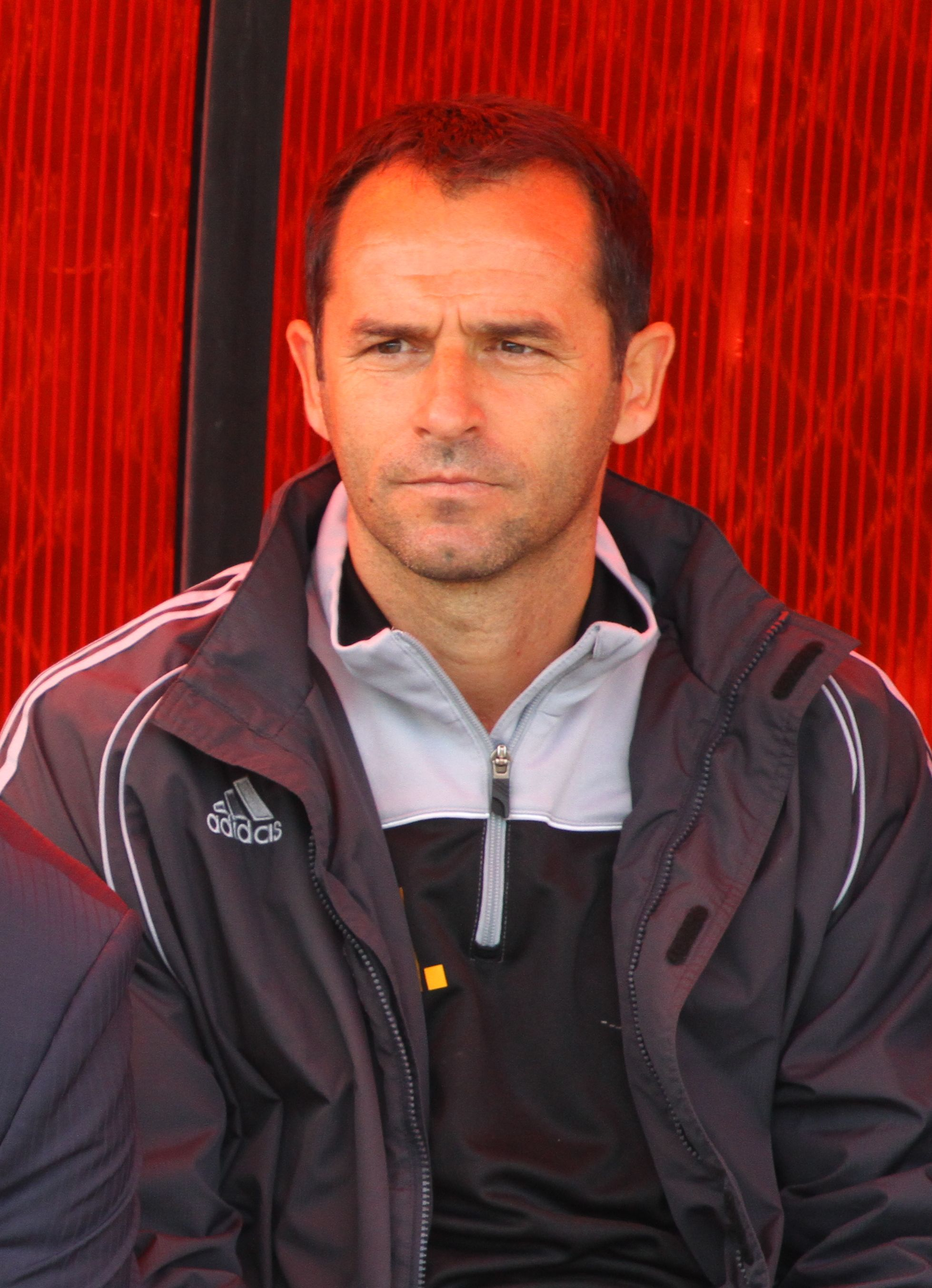
Said Ibraimov

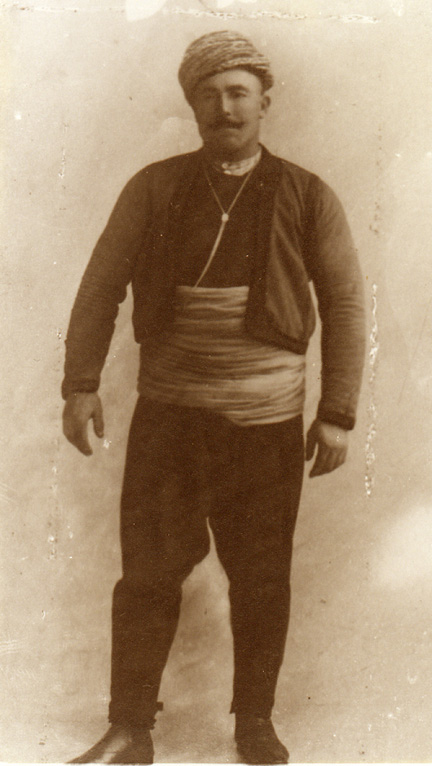
Yusuf İsmail

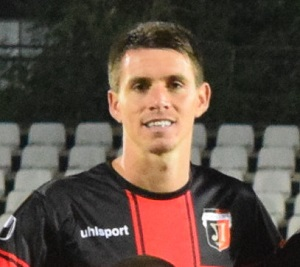
Birsent Karagaren

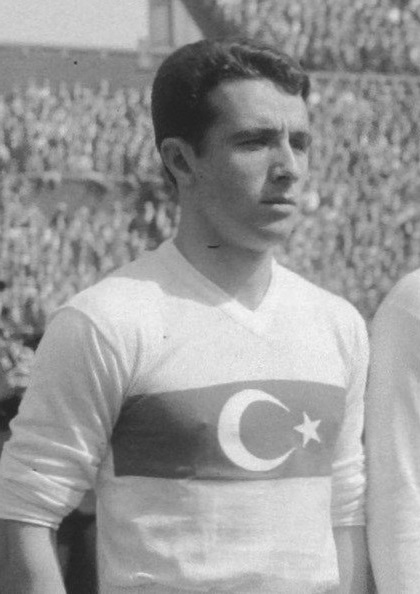
Hilmi Kiremitçi

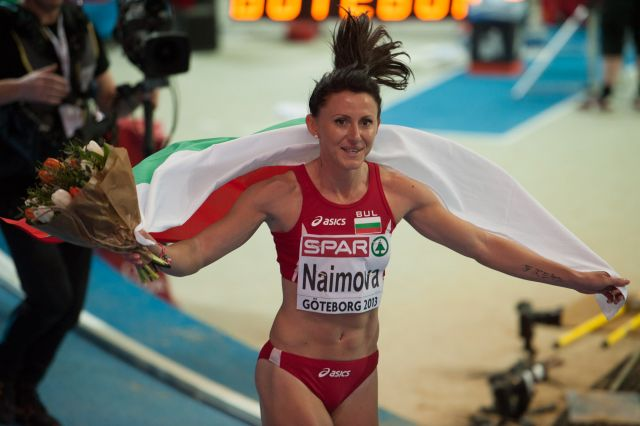
Tezdzhan Naimova

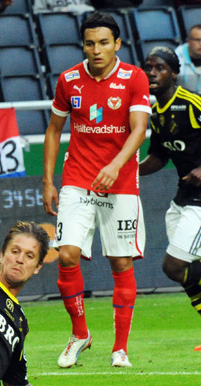
Emin Nouri

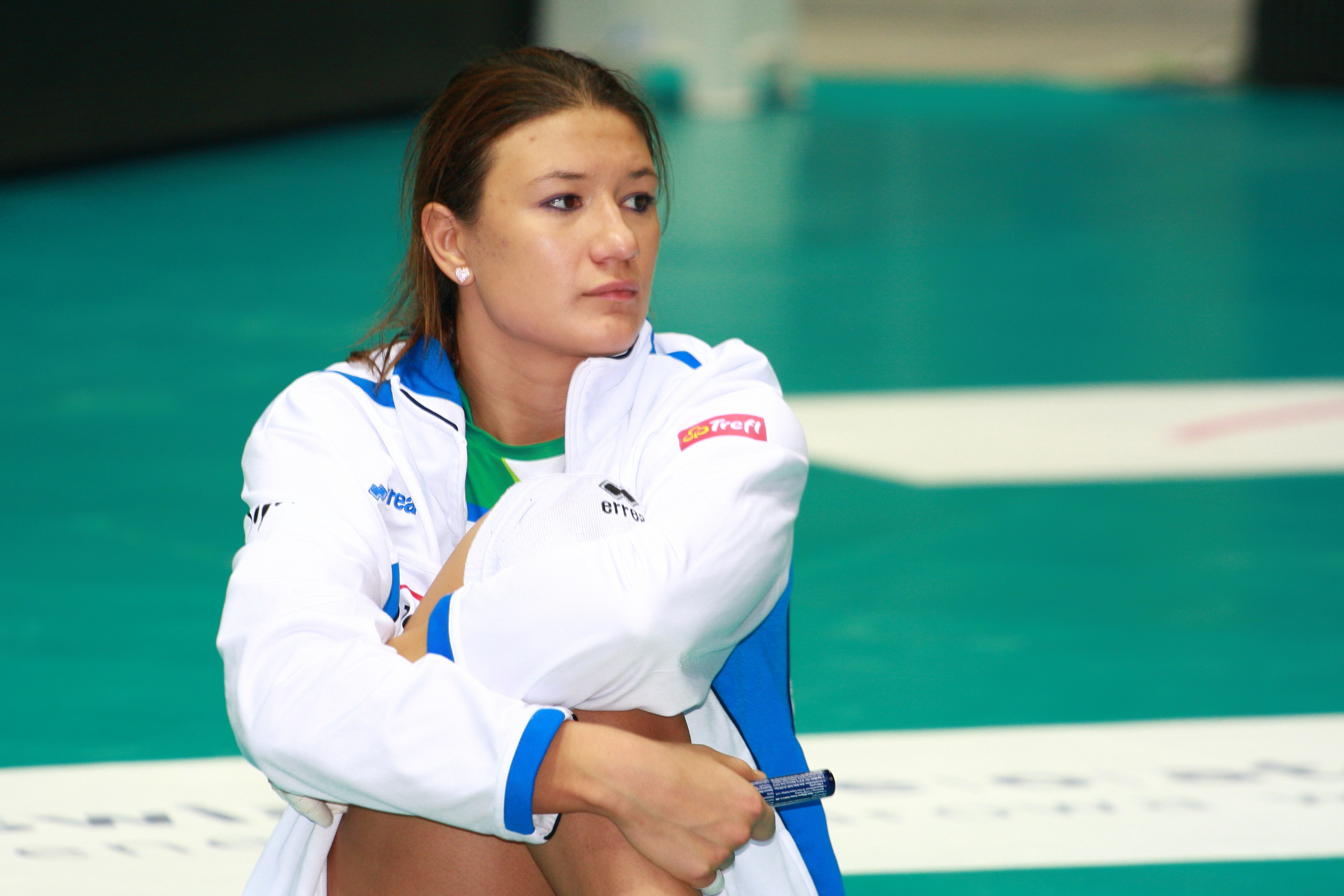
Neriman Özsoy

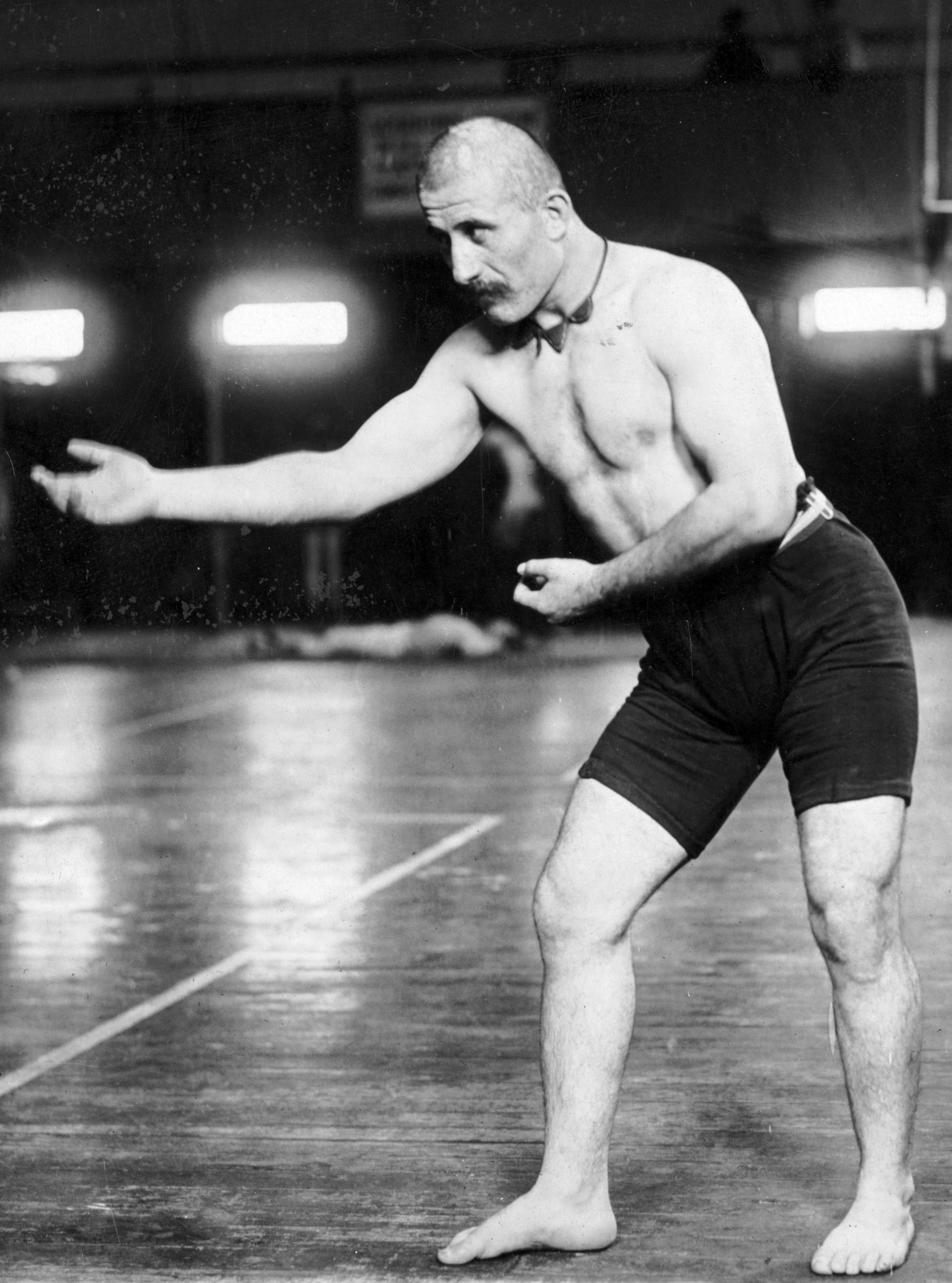
Kızılcıklı Mahmut Pehlivan

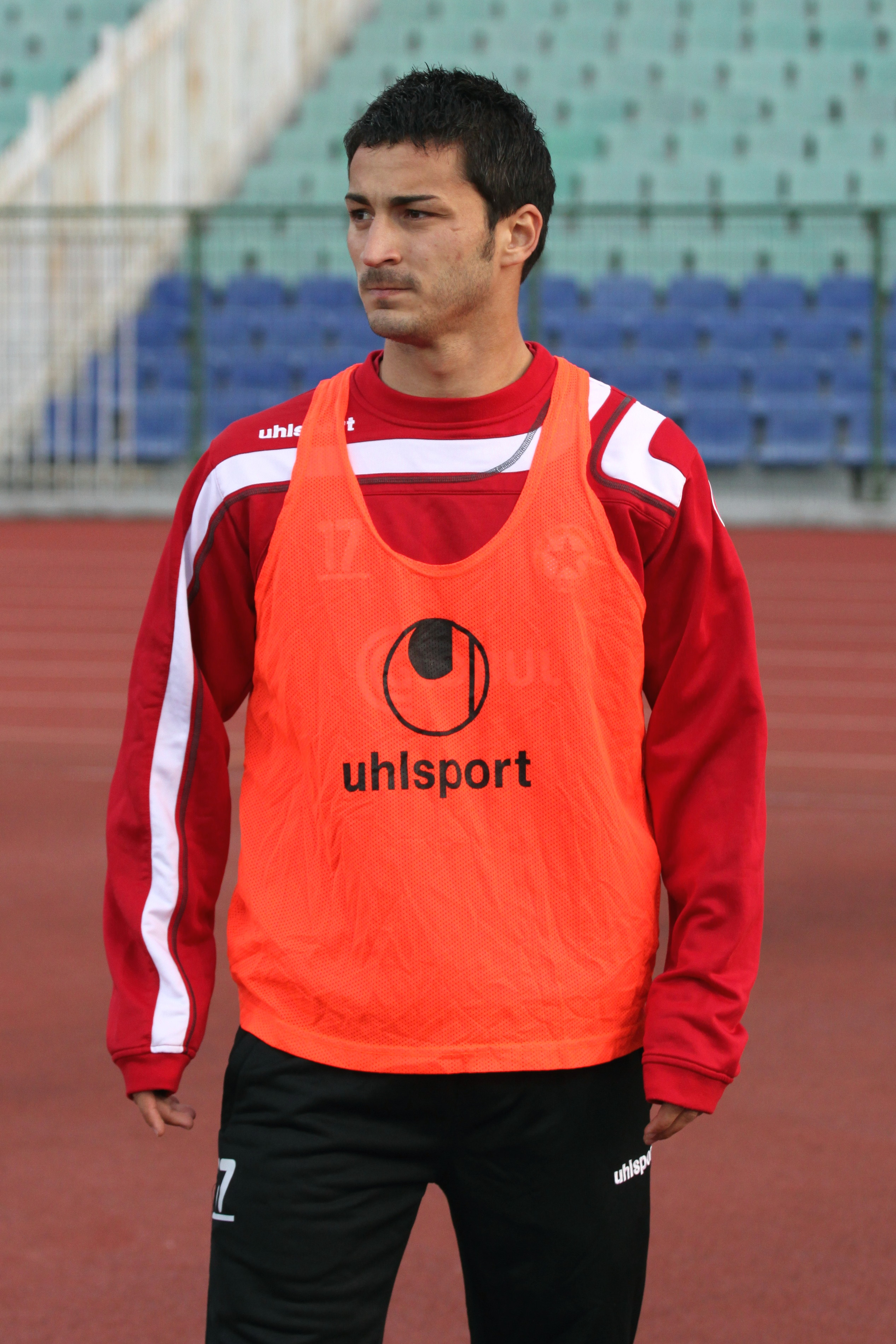
Chetin Sadula

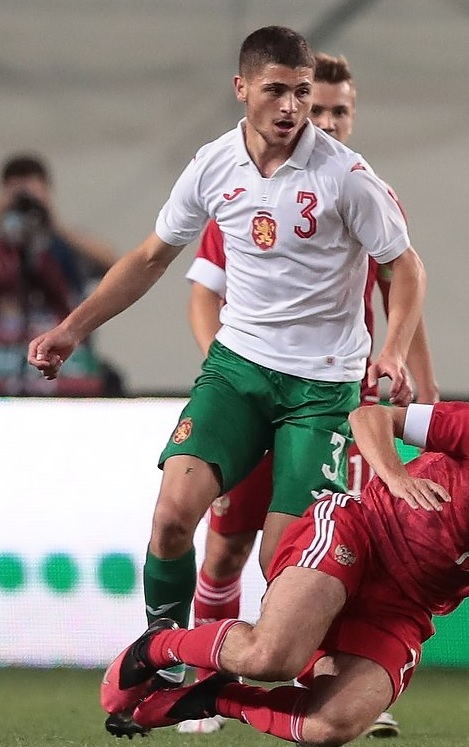
Ertan Tombak

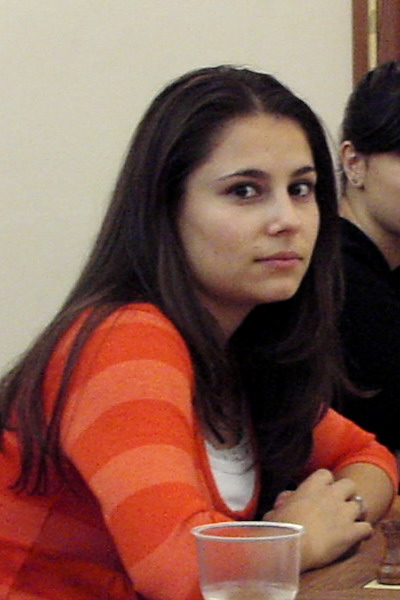
Zehra Topel

- Ismail Abilov, Olympic wrestler
- Emin Ahmed, football player
- Lyutvi Ahmedov, Olympic wrestler
- Reyhan Arabacıoğlu, Turkish Olympic weightlifter
- Samet Ashimov, football player
- Şenol Can, Turkish football player and manager of Fatih Karagümrük S.K. (born in Kardzhali)
- Ekrem Celil, Turkish European champion weightlifter (born in Kardzhali)
- Beyhan Çalışkan, Turkish football player (born in Ruse)
- Ali Ahmet Çapraz, wrestler
- Mecnur Çolak, Turkish football player (born in Razgrad)
- Demir Demirev, weightlifter
- Basri Dirimlili, Turkish football player (born in Silistra)
- Aksel Gürcan Demirtaş, Turkish sprinter (born in Varna)
- Osman Duraliev, Olymipic wrestler
- Mehmed Fikretov, weightlifter
- Ekrem Genç, football player
- Zekeriya Güçlü, wrestler
- Fedail Güler, Turkish World Champion weightlifter (born in Bulgaria)
- Sibel Güler, Turkish taekwondo practitioner (born in Bulgaria)
- Gürhan Gürsoy, football player
- Mehmet Hacıoğlu, Turkish football player and coach (born in Plovdiv)
- Nurullah Hasan, Ottoman wrestler (born in Shumen)
- Ahmed Hikmet, football player
- Soner Hyusein, football player
- Hergeleci Ibrahim, Turkish oil wrestler (born in Ezerche)
- Murad Ibrahim, football player
- Said Ibraimov, football player and coach of FC Tobol
- Ismail Isa, football player
- Hasan Isaev, Olympic wrestler
- Yusuf İsmail, Ottoman wrestler (born in Shumen)
- Arhan Isuf, football player
- Birsent Karagaren, football player who plays for the Bulgaria national football team
- Alper Kasapoğlu, Turkish Olympic athlete (born in Razgrad)
- Myumyun Kashmer, football player
- Dzhihat Kyamil, football player
- Kızılcıklı Mahmut, Turkish wrestler (born in Silistra)
- Teynur Marem, football player
- Husein Mehmedov, Olympic wrestler
- Bahar Mert, Turkish volleyball player (born in Kardzhali)
- Mesut Mert, Canadian football coach
- Said Mustafov, Olympic wrestler
- Halil Mutlu, Turkish Olympic weightlifter (born in (Momchilgrad)
- Tezdzhan Naimova, sprinter
- Emin Nouri, Swedish and Azerbaijani football player (born in Kardzhali)
- Filiz Osmanodja, German-born chess player (Turkish Bulgarian parents)
- Gülümser Öney, Turkish chess player (born in Pleven)
- Nesim Özgür, football player
- Semavi Özgür, Turkish football player (born in Bulgaria)
- Yılmaz Özlem, Turkish football player (born in Bulgaria)
- Neriman Özsoy, Turkish volleyball player (born in Razgrad)
- Erdoğan Partener, Turkish Olympic basketball player (born in Plovdiv)
- Cahit Paşa, Turkish football player (born in Kardzhali)
- Kurtdereli Mehmet Pehlivan, Ottoman and Turkish wrestler (born in Bukurovo)
- Ismet Ramadan, football player
- Bekir Rasim, football player
- Shener Remzi, football player
- Ruzhdi Ruzhdi, Paralympian track and field athlete
- Erol Sabanov, German-born football player (Turkish Bulgarian parents)
- Ayan Sadakov, former football player
- Çetin Sadula, football player
- Nezir Sağır Turkish Olympic weightlifter (born in Isperih)
- Taner Sağır, Turkish World and Olympic weightlifting champion (born in Kardzhali)
- Dormushali Safet Saidhodzha, football player
- Salim Salimov, Olympic boxer
- Nermedin Selimov, Olympic wrestler
- Yakup Sertkaya, Turkish football player (born in Kardzhali)
- Shaban Shefket, football player
- İlyas Şükrüoğlu, Turkish Olympic wrestler (born in Kardzhali)
- Naim Süleymanoğlu, Turkish World and Olympic weightlifter (born in Ptichar)
- Aysel Taş, Turkish javelin thrower (born in Bulgaria)
- Serafim Todorov, Turkish boxer (born in Peshtera)
- Ertan Tombak, football player
- Zehra Topel, Turkish chess player (born in Shumen)
- Gursel Veli, football player
- Aykut Yanukov, football player
- Dzuneit Yashar, football player
- Nevriye Yılmaz, Turkish basketball player (born in Plovdiv)
- Yuksel Yumerov, football player
- Oktay Yusein, football player
- Serkan Yusein, football player
- Taybe Yusein, wrestler
- Nejdet Zalev, Olympic wrestler

== Others ==
- Türkan Feyzullah, 18-month-old baby shot by Bulgarian troops during an anti-Bulgarisation protest

== See also ==
- Turks in Bulgaria
- List of Bulgarians
