= Campaigns of the Arab Revolt =

Arabia and Southern Arabia Campaigns
- Part of Middle Eastern theatre of World War I
- Flag of the Arab Revolt
Date	June, 1916-January, 1919
Location	Saudi Arabia, Jordan, Syria, Lebanon
Result	Armistice of Mudros; Treaty of Sèvres

Belligerents
(Arab Revolt) Hejazi Arabs; United Kingdom	Ottoman Empire; German Empire

Commanders and leaders
(Arab Revolt) Faisal (United Kingdom) T. E. Lawrence	(Ottoman Empire) Ahmed Djemal (Ottoman Empire) Fakhri Pasha (German Empire) Liman von Sanders

The Arab Revolt started by Sherif Hussein ibn Ali had a series of campaigns, starting from Mecca in June 1916. Here is a list of these campaigns:

- The Battle of Makkah started on the morning of June 10, 1916, and was the beginning of the Arab Revolt. It ended with the capture of the city by the forces of Sherif Hussein ibn Ali.
- Jeddah was attacked on June 9 by 4000 Sharifian forces.
- Siege of Medina was started in the middle of 1916 and continued till January 9, 1919. Fakhri Pasha's heroic and stubborn resistance was cause of this long siege.
- Taif was surrendered to Hashemite forces on September 23, 1916.
- Al Lith was occupied by Sharifian forces on June 23.
- Yanbu was captured on July 27. Ummlajj was captured after Yanbu.
- Qunfudah was captured on October 10.
- Wejh, the port city was captured in the mid of January 1917 with little difficulty. Only 200 Ottoman soldiers were there.
- Aqaba fell to Sharifian forces on July 6, 1917.
- The Battle of Wadi Musa was fought on October 23, 1917, when Ottoman army was sent to deal with Sharifian army camped at Wadi Musa. Before the Ottoman unit reached Wadi Musa, they were intercepted by 700 Arab troops under the command of Maulood Mukhlis. Four hundred Ottomans were killed and 300 were captured.
- The Battle of Al-Samna was a defeat to Sharifian army. Al-Samna is situated near Ma'an. The battle took place on April 25–26, 1918.
- Damascus was captured by British and Sharifian forces on October 1, 1918.
