= Gabriel Núñez =

Gabriel Núñez may refer to:

- Gabriel Núñez (footballer, born 1942), defender who played for Zacatepec and the Mexico national football team
- Gabriel Núñez (footballer, born 1994), Salvadoran-born Dominican midfielder who plays for Independiente FC and the Dominican Republic national football team
- Gabriel Núñez (scientist), Spanish molecular biologist and immunologist
