= Atasoy =

Atasoy is a surname. Notable people with the surname include:

- Ahmet Emin Atasoy (born 1944), Bulgarian-born Turkish poet, author and interpreter
- Demir Atasoy (born 1987), Ukrainian-born Turkish swimmer
- Fadik Sevin Atasoy (born 1975), Turkish actress, scriptwriter, film director, and writer
- Nurhan Atasoy (born 1934), Turkish art historian
- Sevil Atasoy (born 1949), Turkish forensic scientist
- Veysel Atasoy (1947–2004), Turkish politician
