= Hejaz Expeditionary Force =

Hejaz Expeditionary Force Hicaz Kuvve-i Seferiyesi
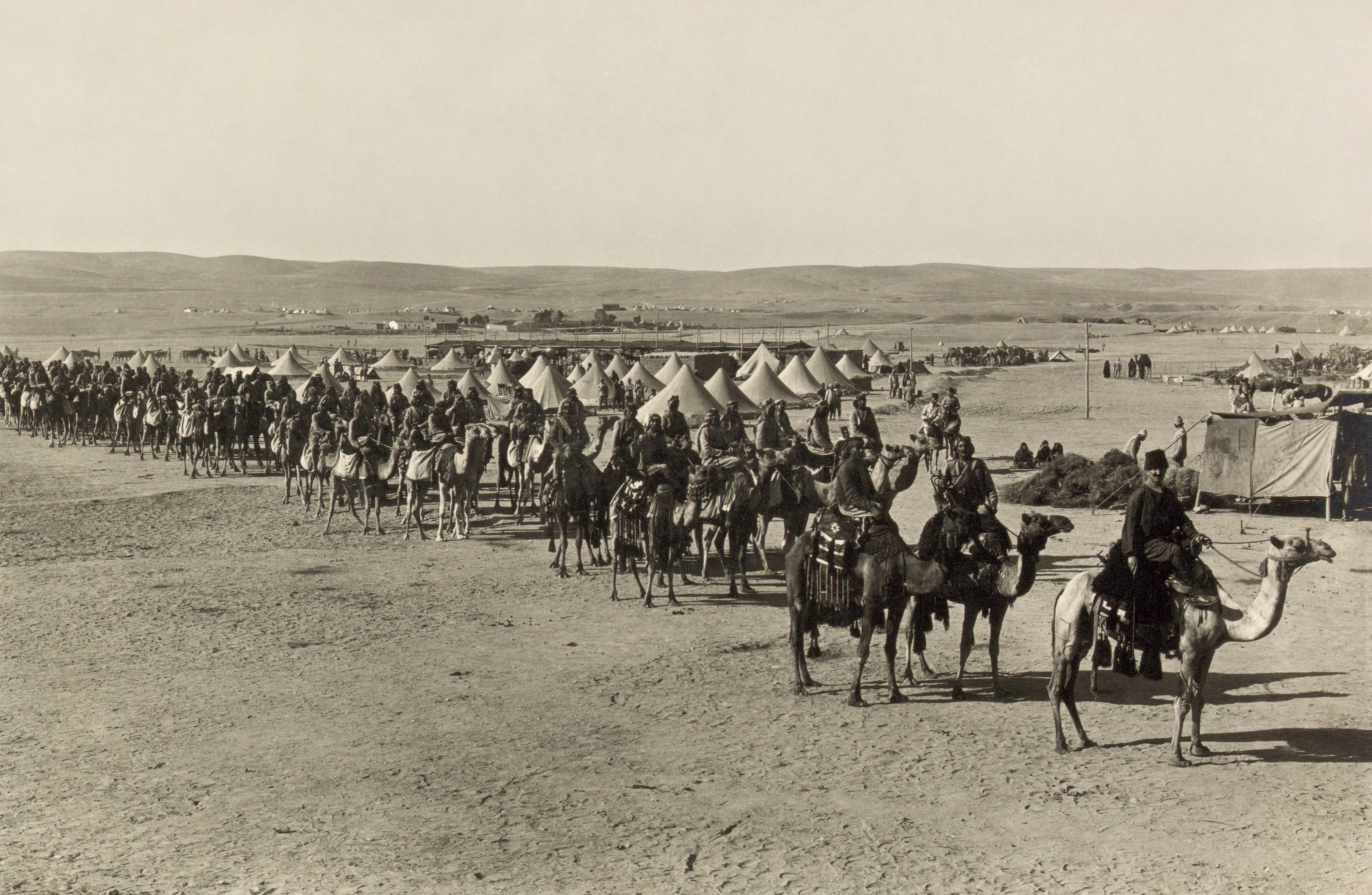
- Ottoman camel riders of the 1st Hecinsüvar Regiment, which took part in First Suez Offensive before the establishing of the Hejaz Expeditionary Force
- Active: 1916 – 9 January 1919
- Country: Ottoman Empire
- Branch: Ottoman Army
- Type: Expeditionary Force
- Garrison/HQ: Medina
- Patron: Sultan of the Ottoman Empire
- Engagements: Arab Revolt (World War I); Siege of Medina

Commanders
- Notable commanders: Ferik Fakhri Pasha

The Hejaz Expeditionary Force (Turkish: Hicaz Kuvve-i Seferiyesi) of the Ottoman Empire was one of the expeditionary forces of the military of the Ottoman Empire. Its commander had the authority of an army commander. It was formed during World War I for the defense of Medina (located in the region known as the Hejaz).

Fahreddin Pasha was appointed to the commander of the Hejaz Expeditionary Force on 17 July 1916. The principal unit of this force, the Medina garrison itself. And the Hejaz Expeditionary Force consisted of 14,000 men by the fall of 1916.

== Order of battle ==
In 1916, the Hejaz Expeditionary Force was structured as follows:

- Hejaz Expeditionary Force HQ (Medina, Commander: Ferik Fahreddin Pasha)
  - 1st Camel Regiment (1 nci Hecinsüvar Alayı)
  - 1st Volunteer Cavalry Regiment (1 nci Akıncı Alayı)
  - Field artillery batteries x 3
  - Signal companies x 2
  - Medical and logistical support elements
