= Gürsel =

Gürsel is both a masculine Turkish given name and a Turkish surname. Notable people with the name include:

== Given name ==
- Gürsel Tekin, Turkish politician
- Gursel Veli (born 1982), Bulgarian footballer

== Surname ==
- Cemal Gürsel, Turkish army officer, and the fourth President of Turkey
- Nedim Gürsel, Turkish writer
