= Nesrin Özören =

Bulgarian-Turkish molecular biologist

- Born: July 25, 1972 (age 54); Paisievo, Silistra Province, Bulgaria
- Education: Boğaziçi University (BS); University of Pennsylvania College of Arts & Sciences (PhD)
- Scientific career
- Fields: Molecular biology
- Workplaces: Boğaziçi University
- Thesis: Involvement of TRAIL-Death Receptors in Human Tumorigenesis and Mechanisms of TRAIL-Induced Apoptosis Signaling (2002)
- Doctoral advisor: Wafik El-Deiry

Nesrin Özören (born July 25, 1972), is a Turkish molecular biologist researching vaccines, apoptosis, innate immune signaling, Behçet's disease, and melanomas. She is a professor at Boğaziçi University.

== Early life and education ==
Nesrin Özören was born in a family of Bulgarian Turks on July 25, 1972, in the Paisievo in Silistra Province, Bulgaria. In 1995, she completed a B.S. in the department of molecular biology and genetics at Boğaziçi University where she graduated second in her class.

In 2002, Özören earned a Ph.D. in the department of biology at the University of Pennsylvania College of Arts & Sciences. Her thesis was titled, Involvement of TRAIL-Death Receptors in Human Tumorigenesis and Mechanisms of TRAIL-Induced Apoptosis Signaling. Her doctoral advisor was Wafik El-Deiry.

From July 2002 to June 2005, Özören was a postdoctoral researcher in the department of pathology at the University of Michigan. Her advisor was Gabriel Núñez.

== Career and research ==
In August 2005, Özören joined the faculty at the Boğaziçi University's department of molecular biology and genetics as an assistant professor. She was promoted to associate professor in 2008 and professor in 2015.

Özören is a founding member of the Cell Death Research Society of Turkey.

Özören researches vaccines, apoptosis, innate immune signaling, Behçet's disease, and melanomas. In 2018, her invention, "Microsphere Technology for Durable Vaccine Carrying Proteins" became the first triadic patent in the field of biotechnology in Turkey. In 2020, Özören is leading a team to develop a COVID-19 vaccine based on her patented technology.

== Controversy ==
In October 2019, Nesrin Özören posted a number of tweets with homophobic and transphobic content, where she described LGBTIQ+ individuals as "exhibitionists who define their existence with their bedrooms" and as "people who do not like their chromosome sets and wage a war against biology." She also claimed that "people who are biologically gay are very few, but their impact is ten times more than their number" and "there are people who are gay or lesbian because it is fashionable." Özören also stated that she would not mind even if the entire United States or China is gay, but she would never want it to be fashionable in Turkey. Students who interpreted Özören's comments to be in conflict with Boğaziçi University's ethics principles concerning gender and sexuality, and potentially harmful to the university's reputation as a scientific institution reported the incident to the administration. The University Rector Mehmed Özkan, however, did not allow the Boğaziçi University Committee on Ethical Conduct in Extramural Academic Relations to evaluate the incident.
