= Ahmet Nuri Diriker =

Turkish military officer

Ahmet Nuri Diriker 1312(1893)-P.23
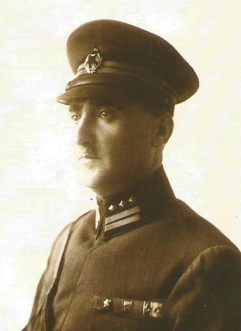
- Major Ahmet Nuri Bey (1915)
- Born: 1876; Rusçuk, Danube Vilayet, Ottoman Empire (now Russe, Bulgaria)
- Died: 1950 (aged 73–74); Istanbul, Turkey
- Military career
- Allegiance: Ottoman Empire (1896–1921); Turkey (1921–1931)
- Branch: Turkish Land Forces
- Rank: Brigadier General
- Conflicts: Greco-Turkish War (1897); Arab Revolt; World War I: Gallipoli Campaign; Siege of Medina; Turkish War of Independence: Greco-Turkish War (1919–1922)

Ahmet Nuri Diriker was a Turkish Brigadier General who fought in the Gallipoli Campaign, Siege of Medina and Turkish War of Independence.

He was born in Rusçuk in 1876. After finishing his studies in Kuleli Military High School, he enrolled in the Ottoman Military Academy. He graduated in 1896 as second lieutenant. He was sent to the Greek border to serve in the Greco-Turkish War of 1897. He later fought against the rebels in the Balkans. He was involved in the clashes with the Boatmen of Thessaloniki in 1903. He later went to Yemen as battalion commander to fight against Arab rebels. In 1915, he was appointed the commander of the 42nd Infantry Regiment in the Gallipoli Campaign. He fought against French troops in Seddülbahir and Kerevizdere regions. In 1916, he and his regiment were sent to the Arabian Peninsula to break the Siege of Medina. After the Treaty of Sèvres, he joined Kuva-yi Milliye (Turkish resistance) and was involved in weapon and ammunition smuggling operations to Ankara. In 1921, he joined the Ankara Government under the command of Mustafa Kemal Atatürk and fought in the Greco-Turkish War (1919–1922). After the war, he presided over various military offices. He retired in 1931 as Brigadier General. He died in 1950. His son is Ali Fuat Diriker (born on 11 November, 1918, the day of the end of World War I), who is, as of October 2026, the oldest known man in Turkey, at nearly 108 years old.

== See also ==
- Kâzım Karabekir
- Battle of Krithia Vineyard
