= Battle of Mecca (1916) =

Part of World War I

- Part of Arab Revolt of the Middle Eastern theatre of World War I
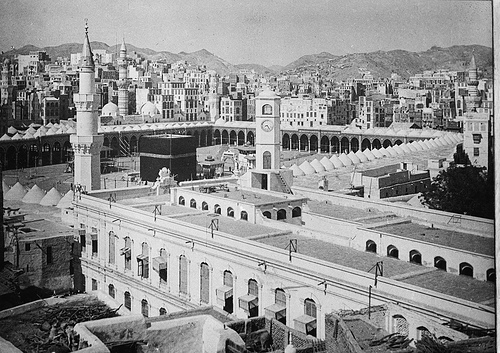
- Mecca in 1910
Date	June 10 – July 4, 1916
Location	Mecca, Hejaz Vilayet, Ottoman Empire
Result	Arab victory
Territorial changes	Mecca was annexed by the Kingdom of Hejaz

Belligerents
(Arab Revolt) Arab rebels British Empire: Egypt	Ottoman Empire

Commanders and leaders
(Arab Revolt) Hussein bin Ali (Arab Revolt) Faisal bin Hussein (Arab Revolt) Ali bin Hussein	(Ottoman Empire) Fakhri Pasha

Strength
5,000	1,000

The Battle of Mecca occurred in the Muslim holy city of Mecca in June and July 1916. On June 10, the Sharif of Mecca, Hussein bin Ali, the leader of the Banu Hashim clan, started a revolt against the Ottoman Caliphate from this city. The Battle of Mecca was part of the Arab Revolt of World War I.

== Background ==
The Sharif of Mecca was planning to make an Arab state from Aden to Aleppo. For this purpose he sought the help of the British. He prepared his four sons too for this ambitious adventure.

== Events ==
In early June 1916, most of the Ottoman garrison had gone to Taif, a hill station near Mecca accompanying Ghalib Pasha, the governor of Hijaz. Only 1,000 men were left to defend Mecca. Many of them were asleep in barracks in the valley on June 10 when Hussein bin Ali, Sharif of Mecca, fired a shot into the air from the window of the Hashemite palace signaling the beginning of the Arab Revolt. Hearing this his 5,000 supporters started firing on Turkish troops in three fortresses overlooking the holy city, and at the Jirwall barracks on Jeddah road. The attack upon the Turkish forces was sudden and their acting commanding officer was unaware that a revolt had started. As Sharif's and the Ottoman banners were of same colour, the Turkish commander could not see the difference, and telephoned Sharif Hussein about the situation and was told the reason and was told to surrender. He refused. The Ottoman troops responded by bombarding Mecca from the heights; during the bombardment, they hit the Kaaba and set fire to the veil that covered it. This incident was later exploited by the propaganda of the Great Arab Revolt to attempt to demonstrate the impiety of the Ottomans and the legitimacy of the revolt as a holy war.

The battle started and continued. On the next day, Banu Hashim's forces advanced and captured Bash-Karakol at Safa corner adjacent to the Masjid al-Haram. On the third day, Hamidia, the Ottoman Government Office, was captured, as well as the Deputy Governor. Now the captive Deputy Governor ordered his remaining Turkish troops to surrender. They refused.

A stalemate resulted. Sir Reginald Wingate sent two artillery pieces from Sudan via Jeddah, with trained Egyptian gunners. They breached the walls of the Turkish fort. The Sharifian army attacked and the fate of the defenders was sealed. On July 4, 1916, the last Turkish resistance in Mecca, Jirwal barracks, capitulated, after three weeks of stubborn resistance.

== Results ==
This battle marked the beginning of the end of the Ottoman Empire, and it also sparked the beginning of the Hashemite Kingdom of Hejaz whose capital was Mecca. Gradually, this kingdom expanded northward. This battle left deep scars in the Middle East. Arab states came under strong European influence. The Ottoman caliphate ended and Palestine came under British rule, leading to the eventual creation of the state of Israel. The Sharif of Mecca was himself deposed by the rival Ibn Saud and his dream of an Arabian state stretching from Yemen to Syria remained unrealized.

== See also ==
- Siege of Medina
- Arab Revolt
