= Suzanitta =

Bulgarian singer

Suzanitta Сузанитта
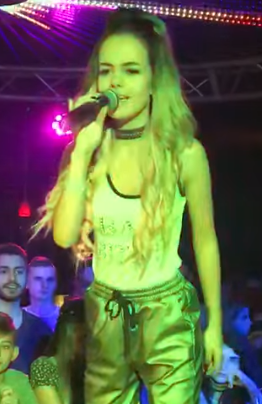
- Suzanitta in 2018

Background information
- Born: Suzan Murad; January 9, 2003 (age 23); Bulgaria
- Origin: Bulgaria
- Genres: Chalga
- Years active: 2012–present

Suzan Murad (born January 9, 2003), known professionally as Suzanitta, is a Bulgarian chalga singer.

== Early life ==
Suzanitta's father is Orhan Murad, a Bulgarian Turk pop-folk singer. She has been making music videos since 2012. Her 2017 music video with Andrea had more than 6.8 million views on YouTube.

In 2017 she made the song "Луцифер и Буда" (Lucifer and Buddha) and became one of the most commented-on Bulgarian singers. Later in 2017 she created a song with Andrea.

== Discography ==
Suzanitta discography
- Singles: 10
- Music videos: 9

=== Singles ===
==== As lead artist ====
List of singles as lead artist, showing year released
Title	Year
"Lucifer and Buddha" (featuring Kaskata)	2017
"Bez Komentar"	2017
"Bye, Bitch"	2018
"Mejdu Gardite"	2019
"Nyakakva Luda"	2020

==== As featured artist ====
List of singles as featured artist, showing year released
Title	Year
"Koronata E Moya" (Adnan Beats featuring Suzanitta)	2016
"Strogo Zabraneno" (Andrea featuring Suzanitta)	2017
"Barabana" (Krum and Suzanitta)	2017
"K'vo Stava Brat" (Angel and Suzanitta)	2018
"Otkrihme Sezona" (Orhan Murad and Suzanitta)	2018
"Malkata Sladka" (Krum and Suzanitta)	2018
