= Gabriel Núñez (footballer, born 1994) =

Salvadoran-born Dominican footballer

Personal information
- Full name: Gabriel Ernesto Núñez D´Alessandro
- Date of birth: 24 January 1994 (age 32)
- Place of birth: Santa Tecla, El Salvador
- Height: 1.74 m (5 ft 9 in)
- Position: Midfielder

Team information
- Current team: Cibao

Youth career
- 2014: Querétaro

Senior career*
| Years | Team | Apps | (Gls) |
| 2016–2017 | Oliveira do Bairro | 1 | (0) |
| 2017 | Naval 1º de Maio | 13 | (0) |
| 2017–2018 | Alba | 17 | (0) |
| 2018–2019 | Gafanha B | 28 | (4) |
| 2019–2020 | Independiente San Vicente | 3 | (0) |
| 2020–2021 | Luis Ángel Firpo | 0 | (0) |
| 2021– | Cibao | 0 | (0) |

International career^{‡}
| 2019– | Dominican Republic | 1 | (0) |
- * Club domestic league appearances and goals as of 28 September 2019 ‡ National team caps and goals as of 12 October 2019

Gabriel Ernesto Núñez D´Alessandro (born 24 January 1994) is a Salvadoran-born Dominican footballer, who plays as a midfielder for Cibao FC and the Dominican Republic national team.

== International career ==
Born and raised in El Salvador, Núñez qualified to play for the Dominican Republic through his mother. He made his senior debut for the Dominican Republic national football team in a 3–0 win against Saint Lucia on 12 October 2019.
