= Ali Ahmet Çapraz =

Turkish professional wrestler

Ali Ahmet Çapraz (1911–?) is a retired Turkish wrestler with a claim to being undefeated in professional wrestling. He is known widely with the nickname Alamet Pehlivan to Turkish public and used the alias Ali Ahmet Bey for his international professional wrestling career.

== Early life and career ==
Çapraz was born in 1911 in the village of Nozharovo, Bulgaria. He trained in oil wrestling from a young age and immigrated to Turkey clandestinely in 1932. He was settled in Lüleburgaz and later moved to Istanbul. Çapraz had participated in prestigious Turkish tournaments such as Kırkpınar. Although a member of the Turkish national team that would later participate in the 1950 World Wrestling Championships, he was expelled due to an alleged breach of discipline. Çapraz then moved to Britain and decided to start a career in professional wrestling.

Çapraz defeated Lebanese wrestler Ali Musa at a World Heavyweight title match held in Beirut on January 31, 1948. He later travelled to many countries and was known for his feuds with Greek, French, and American wrestlers such as Karpozilos, Iliyazi, Bagras, and Kosta Natail.

== Personal life ==
As of 2001, Çapraz and his second wife (married in 1979) were living in Bandırma where he settled after retirement. He died sometime between 2001 and 2006.
