= Soner Hyusein =

Bulgarian footballer

Personal information
- Full name: Soner Shenol Hyusein
- Date of birth: 29 April 1998 (age 28)
- Place of birth: Silistra, Bulgaria
- Height: 1.90 m (6 ft 3 in)
- Position: Forward

Youth career
- 2008–2014: FC Dulovo
- 2014–2017: Dunav Ruse

Senior career*
| Years | Team | Apps | (Gls) |
| 2017–2018 | Dunav Ruse | 2 | (0) |
| 2017 | → Lokomotiv Ruse (loan) | 15 | (8) |
| 2018–2021 | Akademik Svishtov | 26 | (23) |
| 2019–2020 | → Septemvri Tervel (loan) | | |
| 2021–2022 | Volov Shumen | 7 | (2) |
| 2022 | Dorostol Silistra | | |
| 2022–2023 | FC Dulovo | | |
| 2023–2024 | Chernolomets Popovo | | |
| 2024 | Benkovski Isperih | | |
| 2024– | Dorostol Silistra | 10 | (1) |
- * Club domestic league appearances and goals as of 20 April 2018

Soner Hyusein (Bulgarian: Сонер Хюсеин; born 29 April 1998) is a Bulgarian footballer who currently plays as a forward.
