= Krum (singer) =

Bulgarian singer (born 1986)

Krum Крум
- Born: 15 August 1986 (age 40); Sofia, Bulgaria
- Genres: Pop (early); chalga
- Occupation: Singer
- Instruments: Voice, flute
- Years active: 2005–present
- Labels: MM Records; Ara Music; Payner; Hit Mix Music

Krum Lyubomirov Sirakov (Bulgarian: Крум Любомиров Сираков; born 15 August 1986), better known mononymously as Krum (Bulgarian: Крум) is a Bulgarian pop and pop-folk singer.

== Career ==
Krum was born on August 15, 1986, in Sofia, to parents Boryana and Lubomir. His introduction to music is largely attributed to his grandmother, who enrolled him in the neighbourhood music school, where he specialised in the flute. His appearances on television in the year 2006 launched his career, leading to the release of his debut single "Тази нощ" (Tonight) in collaboration with Deep Zone Project.

In 2009, he started singing professionally, focusing on pop music and pop-folk music. His songs were popular in Bulgaria. In the same year, he also took part in the Bulgarian TV dance competition VIP Dance. His debut album Не си играй с мен, arranged by Miro Gechev (Миро Гечев), was released by ARA MUSIC.

Krum's awards include:

- "Best New Artist" in 2006
- "Best Progressive Performer" in 2007
- "Best music video" in 2008
- "Best Duet of Year" in 2009, for his collaboration with singer Emanuela.

Krum participates annually in the national campaign to prevent human trafficking. In 2010, he performed in the concert "Balkan music", where countries from all over the Balkans compete.

In 2012, Krum launched his own fashion line called "By Krum".

He appeared in the reality television series Survivor: Cambodia in the fifth season of the show in Bulgaria.

In 2016, he left Payner (Пайнер) to join Otsko's (Оцко) newly established company Hit Mix Music.

== Discography ==
=== Albums ===
- Не си играй с мен (English: Don't play me)
- Не друг, а аз (English: No one else but me)

=== Videoclips ===
- 2006: Докога (English: Till when)
- 2006: Мислите ми плени /remix/ (English: You captured my dreams)
- 2007: Любовен дует (English: Love duet)
- 2008: Винаги помни (English: Always remember)
- 2008: Модел на греха (English: Model of the sin)
- 2009: В едно огледало (с Миро) (English: In one mirror, feat. Miro)
- 2009: С близалка в ръка (English: With lollipop in hand)
- 2009: Нищо не знаеш (с Емануела)(English: You don't know anything feat. Emanuela)
- 2009: Заповядвам ти (English: I command you)
- 2010: Не друг, а аз (English: No one else but me)
- 2010: Да свършим ТВ Версия (English: Let's finish) (Tv version)
- 2010: Стоп (със Sanja Gjosevska) (English: Stop)
- 2010: Прецака ме (English: You Screwed Me feat. Sanja Gjosevska)
- 2010: Буба лази (trio with Debora and Kristiana)
- 2010: Трудна (English: Difficult Woman)
- 2011: Танци-манци (English: Dances)
- 2011: Do It, Baby
- 2011: Руска рулетка (Russian Roulette)
- 2011: Касичка прасе (Box Pig)
- 2012: Вреден (Harmful)
- 2013: Отровна (Poisonous)
- 2013: Остани (Stay)
- 2013: Целувай и хапи (Kiss and bite) (with Ani Hoang)
- 2013: Най-добрата (The best)
- 2013: Боклук (Trash)
- 2014: И да пишат, че съм гей (Let them write that I'm gay)
- 2014: Бий ме, обичам те (Fight me, I love you)
- 2014: Безчувствен (Senseless)
- 2015: Забрави (feat. Anelia) (Forget it)
- 2015: Скорпион (Scorpion) (feat. Emanuela)
- 2016: Както желаете, мис (As you wish, Miss)
- 2016: Ала-бала
- 2016: Твойта кожа (with Andrea) (Your skin)
- 2017: Рицар (Knight)
- 2018: ЧИКИ-РИКИ (CHIKI-RIKI) (With SOFI MARINOVA)
