= Shaban Shefket =

Bulgarian footballer

Personal information
- Date of birth: 16 November 1969 (age 56)
- Place of birth: Shumen, Bulgaria
- Position: Defender

Senior career*
Years	Team	Apps	(Gls)
1990–1998	PFC Shumen 2010		
- * Club domestic league appearances and goals

Shaban Shefket (Bulgarian: Шабан Шефкет; born 16 November 1969) is a Bulgarian former footballer who played as a defender for PFC Shumen 2010 in the 1990s when the club achieved promotion to the A PFG. He has also represented amateur side "Трите мечки" ("The three bears") that won the 2007 edition of the Kamenitsa Fan Cup and unusually for a footballer has supplemented his income by working as a fortune-teller.
