= Yuksel Yumerov =

Bulgarian footballer

Yuksel Yumerov (first name spelt in Turkish as Yüksel) (Bulgarian: Юксел Юмеров) (born 16 October 1968) is a former Bulgarian footballer of Bulgarian-Turkish descent. Among his club teams are PFC Shumen 2010, Han Asparouh (Isperih) and Belasitsa. He has played football at the non-professional level, but also appeared in A PFG matches for FC Volov Shumen.
