= Siege of Medina =

Siege during WWI

- Part of Arab Revolt of the Middle Eastern theatre of World War I
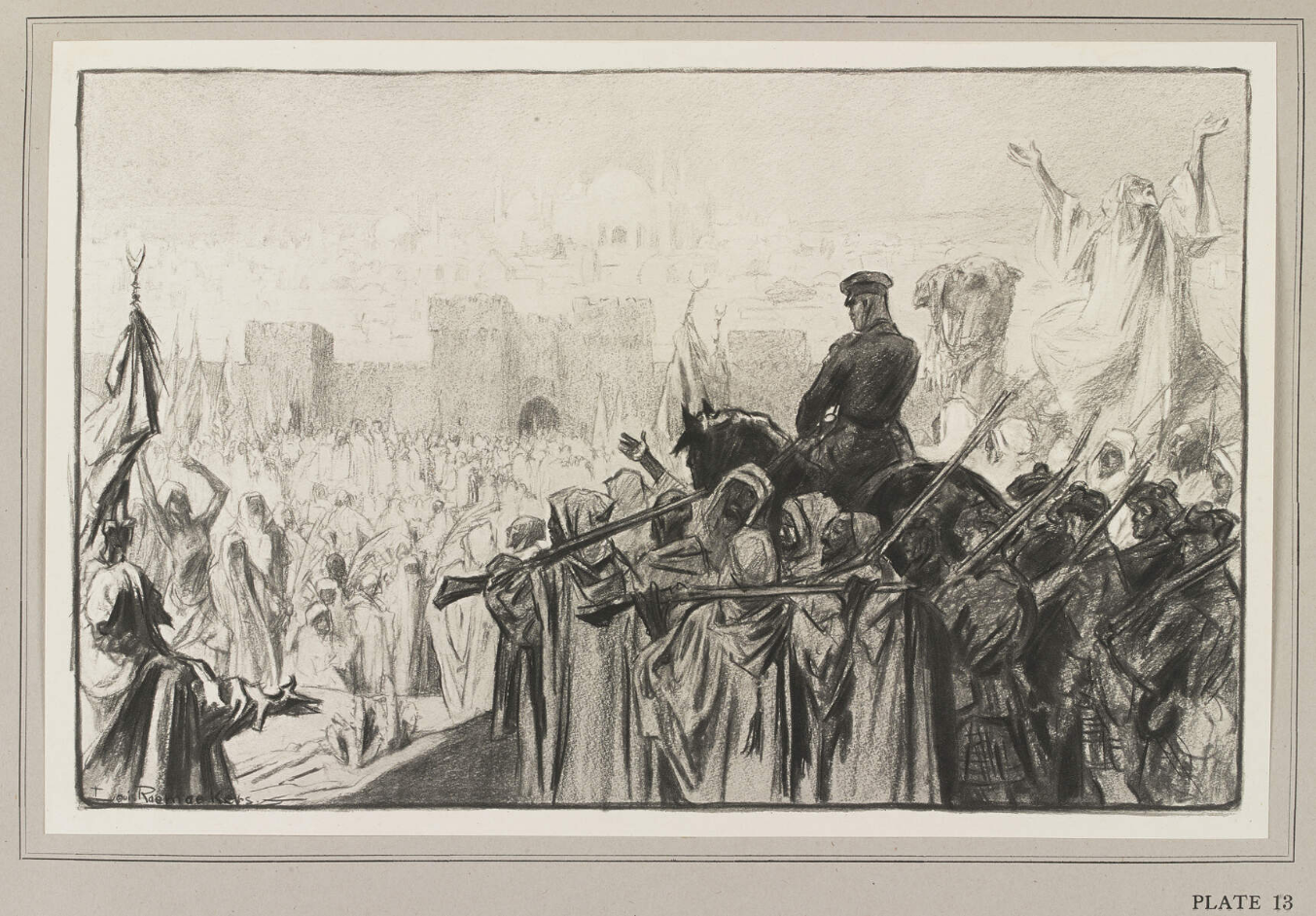
- Allegorical illustration by Louis Raemaekers on the Arabs' celebration of the surrender of Medina
Date	10 June 1916 – 10 January 1919 (2 years and 7 months)
Location	Medina, Hejaz Vilayet, Ottoman Empire
Result	Hejazi victory

Belligerents
Hejaz	Ottoman Empire

Commanders and leaders
Faisal bin Hussein; Abdullah bin Hussein; Ali bin Hussein	Fahreddin Pasha (POW)

Strength
30,000 (1916); 50,000 (1918)	3,000 (1916)

Casualties and losses
Heavy	8,000 evacuated to Egypt

The siege of Medina lasted from 10 June 1916 to 10 January 1919, when Hejazi Arab rebels surrounded the Islamic holy city, which was then under the control of the Ottoman Empire.

The Ottoman Empire joined the war on the side of the Central Powers under the leadership of the Ottoman Sultan, Mehmed V. In an attempt to weaken the Ottomans, the Allies provoked an Arab Revolt within the empire led by Sharif Hussein bin Ali of Mecca.

Sharif Hussein, supported by British and French agents, occupied Mecca and later besieged Medina. The second holiest city in Islam was then guarded by an Ottoman battalion led by Fahreddin Pasha, who resisted for two years and seven months, a persistent defense that lasted even after the war had ended.

== Background ==
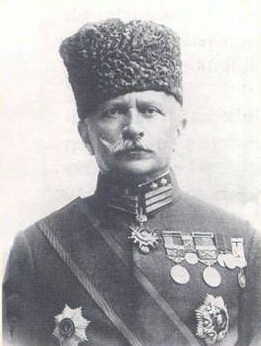
Fahreddin Pasha

In November 1914, British diplomats made contact with Sharif Hussain of Mecca, which would then be a two-year dialogue also known as the McMahon–Hussein Correspondence. The British offered materiel support in exchange for Sharif Hussain to switch allegiance to the Allies and stage a revolt with a promise of a future Hashemite Caliphate from Aden to Aleppo under British protectorate. With increasing fears that Ottomans were clamping down on subversive Arab nationalists, Sharif Hussain staged a region-wide revolt in June 1916.

The prime objectives of the initial revolt was to deprive the Ottomans of any legitimacy to the title of Caliphate by capturing the two holy cities of Mecca and Medina. The Arabs began to capture Mecca against the surprised but well-equipped Ottoman defenders and culminated in the Battle of Mecca. Once Mecca was captured, the Arabs turned their attention to Medina, which was defended by a larger Ottoman force complemented by the strategic Hejaz Railway.

== Siege ==
The siege began in October 1916 when the Arabs led by Hussein's son Faisal were repulsed with heavy losses by the Ottomans, who were fortified and armed with artillery in contrast to the mobile irregular Arab force. This would prove detrimental as the Ottomans reinforced the city of thousands of soldiers with necessary supplies. The Ottomans tried to recapture coastal ports that were used to supply the Arabs, but were foiled by the Royal Navy.

At this point, Arab and Allied planners decided to lay siege to Medina instead of forcefully breaching it. The Ottomans were pinned down in the city whilst desperately protecting the Hejaz Railway, the only means of supply. By pinning the 12,000 Ottomans in Medina, it would leave other fronts much easier to win, such as in Palestine, Sinai, Mesopotamia, and Aqaba.

For this purpose, Nuri as-Said set about creating military training camps in Mecca under the direction of General 'Aziz 'Ali al-Misri. Using a mix of Bedouin volunteers, Arab officers and Arab Ottoman deserters who defected to the Arab Revolt, 'Aziz 'Ali created three infantry brigades, a mounted brigade, an engineering unit, and three different artillery groups made up of a patchwork of varying cannon and heavy caliber machine guns. Of his total force of 30,000, 'Aziz 'Ali proposed that it be divided into three armies:

- The Eastern Army under the command of Prince Abdullah bin Hussein would be in charge of surrounding Medina from the east.
- The Southern Army, commanded by Prince Ali bin Hussein, would ensure a cordon was formed around Medina from the south.
- The Northern Army, commanded by Prince Faisal, would form a cordon around Medina from the north.

These armies had elements of British and French officers attached to them who provided technical military advice. One of these officers was the famous T. E. Lawrence. Over the course of 1917–1918, the Arabs numerously attempted to sabotage the Hejaz Railway. Ottoman garrisons of the isolated small train stations withstood the continuous night attacks and secured the tracks against increasing number of strikes (around 130 major attacks in 1917 and hundreds in 1918 including exploding more than 300 bombs on 30 April 1918). The Arabs aided the British wherever they can, their efforts paved the way for the British annexation of the Levant.

With the resignation of the Ottoman Empire from the war with the Armistice of Mudros between the Ottoman Empire and the Entente on 30 October 1918, it was expected that Fahreddin Pasha would also surrender. He refused and did not surrender even after the end of the war despite pleas from the Ottoman sultan. He held the city until 72 days after the end of the war.

== Conclusion ==
The British eventually understood that they could not defeat Fahreddin Pasha with their military power. Instead, they bribed some of the soldiers in his army, who then arrested him on 10 January 1919. Abdullah I of Jordan and his troops entered Medina on 13 January 1919. After the surrender, the Arab troops looted the city for 12 days. Overall, 4,850 houses which were locked and put under seal by Fahreddin Pasha were opened forcefully and looted.

About 8,000 men (519 officers and 7,545 soldiers) of the Turkish garrison were evacuated to Egypt after their surrender. Besides the evacuated, some died of disease and others dispersed on their own to various areas. The weapons and ammunition of the garrison were left to the besiegers.

== See also ==
- Abdullah I of Jordan
- Damascus Protocol
- Battle of Mecca 1916
- Campaigns of the Arabian Revolt
- Middle Eastern theatre of World War I
