= Gursel Veli =

Bulgarian footballer

Personal information
- Full name: Gursel Ismail Veli
- Date of birth: 8 August 1982 (age 44)
- Place of birth: Plovdiv, Bulgaria
- Height: 1.76 m (5 ft 9 in)
- Position: Midfielder

Team information
- Current team: Vereya

Senior career*
Years	Team	Apps	(Gls)
2000–2002	Maritsa	?	(?)
2002–2003	Spartak Varna	1	(0)
2004–2005	Svetkavitsa	28	(4)
2005–2006	Spartak Plovdiv	23	(7)
2007–2009	Loko Plovdiv	23	(0)
2009–2010	Nesebar	26	(0)
2012	Oborishte Panagyurishte	?	(?)
2012	Septemvri Simitli	?	(?)
2013–	Vereya	0	(0)
- * Club domestic league appearances and goals as of 18 December 2012

Gursel Veli (Bulgarian: Гюрсел Вели Turkish: Veli Gürsel) (born 8 August 1982) is a Bulgarian football player of Turkish origin, currently playing for Vereya as a midfielder. Veli is an offensive midfielder. His first club was Maritsa Plovdiv. Between 2004 and 2006 he played for PFC Svetkavitsa and Spartak Plovdiv. Veli signed a 3-year deal with Lokomotiv Plovdiv after being released from Spartak Plovdiv in 2007. He was given the No.10 shirt. Veli made his official debut for Lokomotiv in a match against Marek Dupnitsa that was held on 22 April 2007. He played for 23 minutes. The result of the match was a 1:3 loss for Loko.

- Height - 1.76 m.
- Weight - 77 kg.
