= Ahmet Emin Atasoy =

Turkish writer

- Born: 16 May 1944; Targovishte, Tsardom of Bulgaria
- Occupations: Poet, author, interpreter

Ahmet Emin Atasoy (born 16 May 1944), is a Bulgarian-born Turkish poet, author and interpreter.

== Biography ==
He graduated from the Department of Turkish Philology at Sofia University. He worked as a literature teacher, art reporter and director of reading halls.

He took refuge in Turkey in 1989.

His poetry, articles and translations were published in magazines such as Cumhuriyet Kitap, Çağdaş Türk Dili, Düşlem, Kavram-Karmaşa, Sincan İstasyonu, Sözcükler, and Yaba Edebiyat. His poems were translated into Azerbaijan Turkish, Bulgarian, English, Macedonian and Romanian. He translated poems by several Bulgarian and Russian poets into Turkish. In 2008, he was awarded "The Great Poetry Award" in the Argeş 11th International Poetry Festival (Romania) and "2008 Special Jury Award" of the European Culture Academy (Bulgaria) for Orpheus’un Liri (Orpheus' Lyre).

== Books ==
=== Poems ===
- Sensizliğinle Beraber (Together with your absence) (1968, Bulgaria)
- Yüreğimde Şirin Tuna Aktıkça (As long as sweet Danube flows in my heart) (1994),
- Duygu Burgacı (Whirlpool of Emotions) (1994),
- Rüzgârların Küstürdüğü Yapraklar (Leaves Stirred by the Winds) (1998)
- Perdeledim Penceremi Geceye (I shut the curtains of my window to the night) (1998)
- Aşkın Yaşı Yok (Love is ageless) (1999)
- Damla Damla (Drop by drop) (1999)
- Sevgi Denizi-Çocuklar İçin Şiirler (Sea of Love-Poems for Children) (2001)
- Küllerde Kor Ararken (Looking for a glowing piece of coal in ashes) (2004)
- Dünya Vurdu Başıma (The world hit me on the head) (2004)
- Çocuk Şiirleri (Children's Poems) (2005)
- Kalabalık Yerinde Yalnızlığın (In the crowded part of loneliness) (2008)
- Gurbet Günbatımları (Immigrant sunsets) (2010)

=== Books in foreign languages ===
- Moleben za dıjd (Rain Prayer, Bulgarian, 2004)
- Eho na ehoto (The Echo's Echo, Macedonian, 2008)
- Jar şi spuzâ (The Ember and the Ash, Romanian, 2010)
- Predi da trıgneş (Before Embarking, Bulgarian, 2010)

=== Poem and prose collation ===
- 1967’nin Bıraktığı Şiirler ((Poems Left by 1967) with Naci Ferhadov, 1969, Bulgaria)
- XV. Yüzyıldan Bugüne Rumeli Motifli Türk Şiiri Antolojisi (The Anthology of Turkish Poetry with Rumelian Motifs since the 15th Century) (2001)
- Polıh ot Bursa (Bursa’dan Esintiler, (Breezes from Bursa) Bulgarian, 2008)

=== Essay / Examination ===
- Birikmiş Yansımalar Vitrini (The Showcase of Collected Reflections) (2004)
