= Gabriel Núñez (scientist) =

Gabriel Núñez, is a Spanish molecular biologist and immunologist who is known for leading one of the first groups that identified NOD1 and NOD2, two important intracellular pattern recognition receptors. He is currently the Paul de Kruif Endowed Professor at the department of pathology at Michigan Medicine. In 2019, he was elected to the National Academy of Medicine for his many contributions to the basic sciences in the field of medicine.
