= Fakhri Pasha =

Turkish general and diplomat

Fakhri Pasha Fahreddin Pasha 1304 (1888)-SV. 1
- Fakhri Pasha / Fahreddin Pasha in 1935 or 1936
- Born: Ömer Fahreddin; 1868 (November or December); Rusçuk, Danube Vilayet, Ottoman Empire
- Died: 22 November 1948 (aged 79–80); Eskişehir, Turkey
- Burial place: Aşiyan Cemetery
- Military career
- Allegiance: Ottoman Empire (1888–1919); Ankara Government (1921–1923); Turkey (1923–1936)
- Branch: Ottoman Army; Army of the GNA; Turkish Land Forces
- Service years: 1888–1919, 1921–1936
- Rank: Lieutenant general
- Nicknames: The Defender of Medina; The Lion of the Desert; The Tiger of the Desert
- Commands: 31st Division, XII Corps, Fourth Army (deputy), Hejaz Expeditionary Force
- Conflicts: Italo-Turkish War; Balkan Wars; World War I Turkish War of Independence
- Other work: Turkish ambassador to Kabul

Ömer Fahrettin Türkkan (1868–1948), commonly known as Fakhri Pasha or Fahreddin Pasha and nicknamed the Defender of Medina, was a Turkish career military officer who commanded Ottoman forces and served as governor of Medina from 1916 to 1919. His British opponents nicknamed him "The Lion of the Desert" and "The Tiger of the Desert" due to his determined defence of Medina from 10 June 1916 to 10 January 1919 during World War I.

== Early life ==
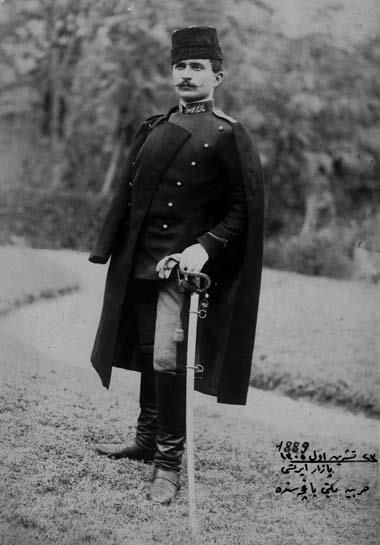
Fahreddin in his early days

He was born in Rusçuk (present day Ruse) to mother Fatma Adile Hanım and father Mehmed Nahid Bey. He had a younger sister Sabiha Hanım, who was married to Alī Ḥaydar Pāshā. Due to the Russo-Turkish War his family moved to Istanbul in 1878. He joined the War Academy, graduating in 1888. His first posting was on the eastern border with Armenia in the Fourth Army. In 1908 he came to Istanbul and joined the First Regular Army. In 1911–12 he was sent to Libya during the Italo-Turkish War and when the First Balkan War broke out, he was the commander of the 31st Division stationed at Gallipoli. His unit recaptured Adrianople (present day Edirne) from Bulgaria and he entered the city along with Enver Pasha.

== Family ==
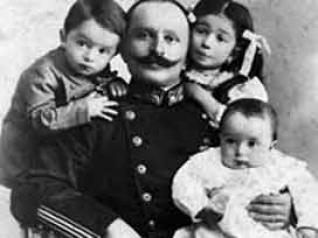
Fakhri Pasha with his children

He married Ayşe Sıdıka Hanımefendi (1884–1959) in 1900, who was the daughter of Ferik Ahmet Paşa. They had five children:

- Suphiye Türkkan 1904–1978 (daughter)
- Mehmed Selim Türkkan 1908–1991 (son)
- Mehmed Orhan Türkkan 1910–1994 (son)
- Ayşe Nermin Türkkan 1919–1997 (daughter)
- Ayhan Türkkan 1927~1928–1959 (son)

== World War I ==
In 1914, before the Ottoman Army was mobilized, Staff Colonel Fahreddin Bey was appointed the commander of the XII Corps stationed in Mosul. He was promoted to the rank of Mirliva on 12 November 1914 and appointed to the Deputy Commander of the Fourth Army stationed in Aleppo.

=== Defender of Medina ===
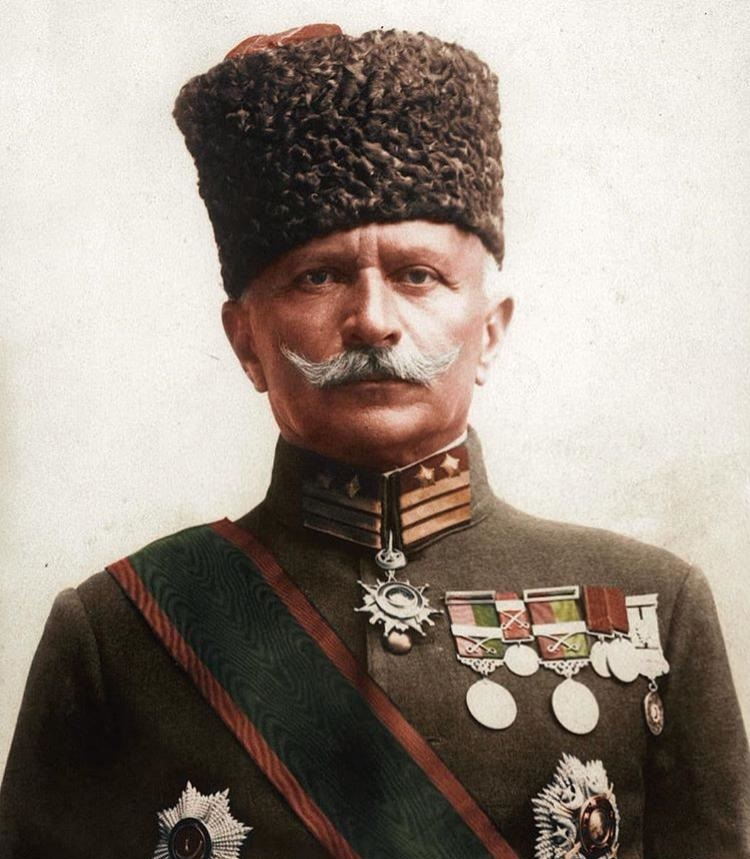
Fahreddin Pasha

During World War I, after Hussein bin Ali, Sharif of Mecca, started preparing for a revolt against the Ottoman Empire, Fahreddin, upon the orders of Djemal Pasha on 23 May 1916 moved toward Medina in Hejaz to defend it; he was appointed the commander of the Hejaz Expeditionary Force on 17 July 1916.

Medina was besieged by the Arab forces who revolted against the Ottoman Sultan and sided with the British against Fahreddin Pasha, but he stood his ground and defended the city. He also protected the single-track narrow gauge Hejaz Railway from sabotage by the Hejazi army. Turkish garrisons of the isolated small train stations withstood the continuous night attacks and secured the tracks against increasing number of attacks (around 130 major attacks in 1917 and hundreds in 1918, including more than 300 bombs on 30 April 1918).

With the withdrawal of the Ottoman Empire from the war with the Armistice of Mudros between the Ottoman Empire and the Allies of World War I on 30 October 1918, it was expected that Fahreddin would also surrender. But he refused to do so and rejected the armistice.

During the siege of Medina, Fahreddin sent the Islamic sacred artefacts and manuscripts of Medina to Istanbul in order to protect them from seizure. Most of the manuscripts were returned to Medina by the Ottoman Empire and are now in libraries in the city, while the rest remain in the Topkapı Palace in Istanbul.

According to eyewitness memoirs of Turkish author Feridun Kandemir, who was a Red Crescent volunteer in Medina at the time, one Friday in the spring of 1918, after prayers in the Masjid al-Nabawi (also known as the Prophet's Mosque), Fahreddin addressed the troops:

"Soldiers! I appeal to you in the name of the Prophet, my witness. I command you to defend him and his city to the last cartridge and the last breath, irrespective of the strength of the enemy. May Allah help us, and may the prayers of Muhammad be with us. "Officers of the heroic Turkish army! O little Muhammads, come forward and promise me, before our Lord and the Prophet, to honor your faith with the supreme sacrifice of your lives."

Fahreddin Pasha had said that he had a vision in a dream that Prophet Muhammad had ordered him not to submit. In August 1918, he received a call to surrender from Sharif Husain of Mecca. Fahreddin Pasha replied him in these words:

"Fakhr-ud-Din, General, Defender of the Most Sacred City of Medina. Servant of the Prophet.

In the name of Allah, the Omnipotent. To him who broke the power of Islam, caused bloodshed among Muslims, jeopardized the caliphate of the Commander of the Faithful, and exposed it to the domination of the British.

On Thursday night the fourteenth of Dhu'l-Hijja, I was walking, tired and worn out, thinking of the protection and defense of Medina, when I found myself among unknown men working in a small square. Then I saw standing before me a man with a sublime countenance. He was the Prophet, may Allah's blessing be upon him! His left arm rested on his hip under his robe, and he said to me in a protective manner, 'Follow me.' I followed him two or three paces and woke up. I immediately proceeded to his sacred mosque and prostrated myself in prayer and thanks [near his tomb].

I am now under the protection of the Prophet, my Supreme Commander. I am busying myself with strengthening the defenses, building roads and squares in Medina. Trouble me not with useless offers."

He refused to surrender and hand over his sword even upon the receipt of a direct order from the Ottoman minister of war. The Ottoman government was upset at his behavior and the Sultan Mehmed VI dismissed him from his post. He refused to submit still and kept the flag of the Ottoman Sultan flying in Medina until 72 days after the end of the war. After the Armistice of Mudros the closest Ottoman unit was 1,300 kilometres (810 mi) from Medina.

He replied to an ultimatum from British General Reginald Wingate on 15 December 1918 with the words: "I am a Muhammadan. I am an Ottoman. I am the son of Bayer Bay. I am a soldier."

Fahreddin was arrested by his own men and brought to Abdullah on 9 January 1919 at Bir Darwish due to lack of food, supplies and exhaustion. Abdullah entered Medina shortly after the surrender, followed by Ali who entered the city on 2 February 1919.

== Life after war ==
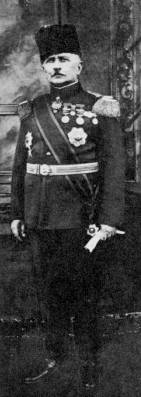
Fahreddin Pasha in Afghanistan

After Fahreddin Pasha's arrest, he was brought to the military barracks at Cairo, Egypt. Later he was transferred to Malta, where he lived as a prisoner of war until 1921. After his release, he joined the Turkish forces under the command of Mustafa Kemal Atatürk and fought against the Greek and French armies occupying Anatolia. After the Turkish War of Independence, he was Turkey's ambassador to Kabul, Afghanistan from 1922 to 1926. In 1936, he was promoted to the rank of Ferik (lieutenant general) and retired from the Turkish Army. Fahreddin Pasha died on 22 November 1948, after suffering a heart attack during a train trip in the vicinity of Eskişehir. According to his wishes, he was buried in the Aşiyan Cemetery in Istanbul.

== Legacy ==
In December 2017, Abdullah bin Zayed Al Nahyan, Foreign Minister of the United Arab Emirates, sparked a diplomatic rift with Turkey by sharing a post on his personal social media account that said Fahreddin and his forces stole manuscripts from Medina, and committed other crimes against the local population during the siege. In response, Turkish President Recep Tayyip Erdoğan called the Foreign Minister ignorant and said, "Some impertinent man sinks low and goes as far as accusing our ancestors of theft... What spoiled this man? He was spoiled by oil, by the money he has. When my ancestors were defending Medina, you impudent (man), where were yours? First, you have to give account for this." A few days later, the Turkish government changed the name of the Ankara street where the UAE Embassy is located to Fahreddin Pasha.

== Gallery ==
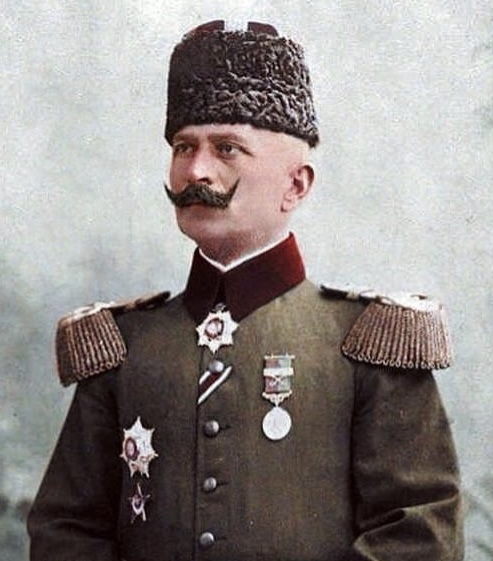
Fahreddin Pasha

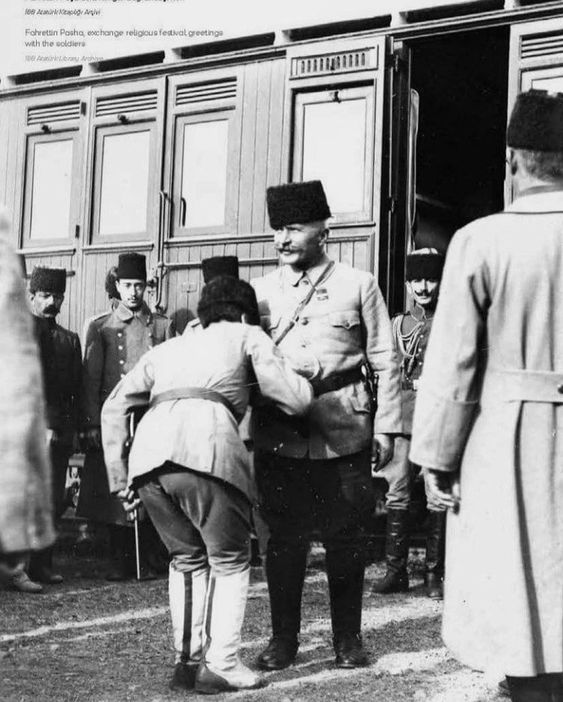
Fahreddin Pasha celebrates Eid with his soldiers in Medina, 1918.

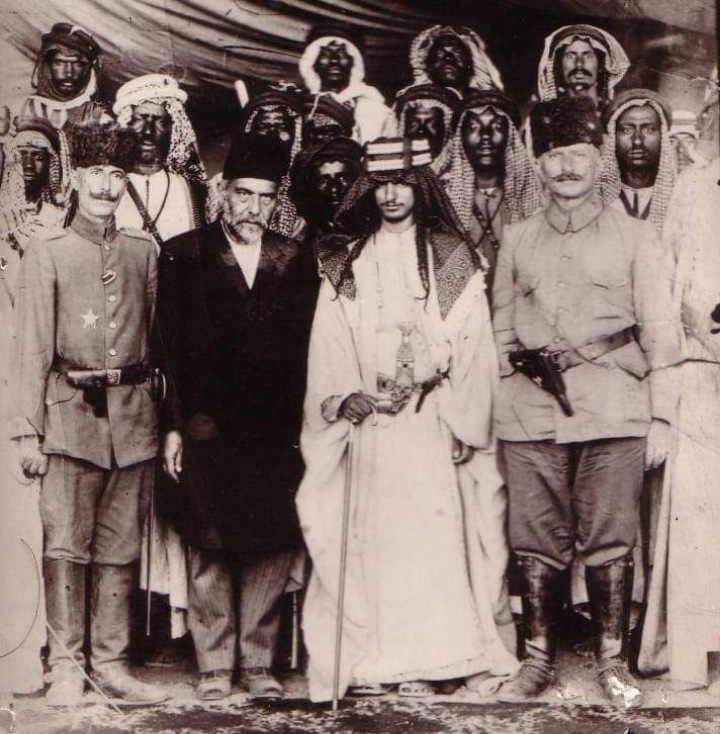
Fahreddin Pasha with Saud bin Abdulaziz Al Rashid of the Emirate of Jabal Shammar

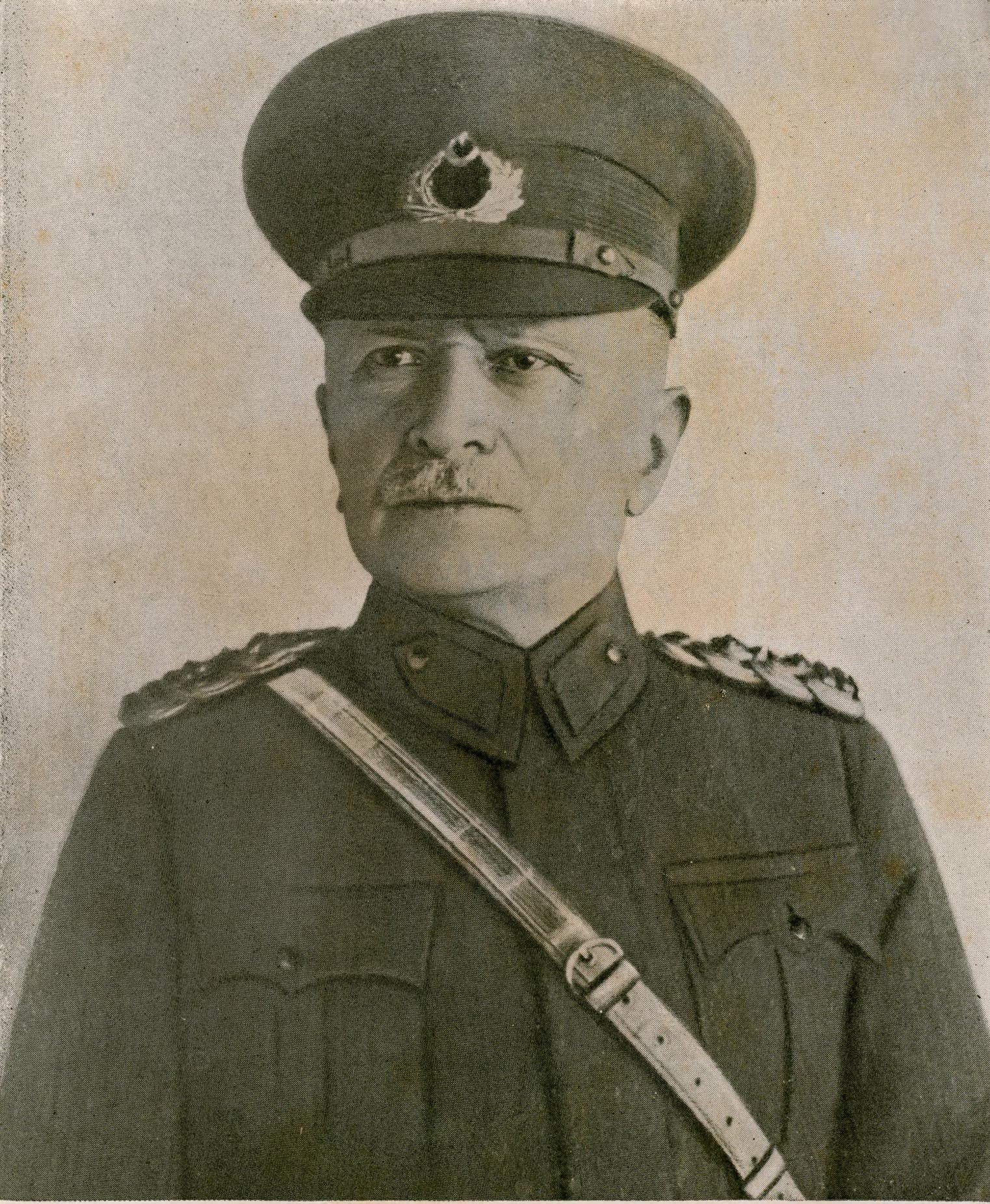
Ömer Fahreddin Türkkan

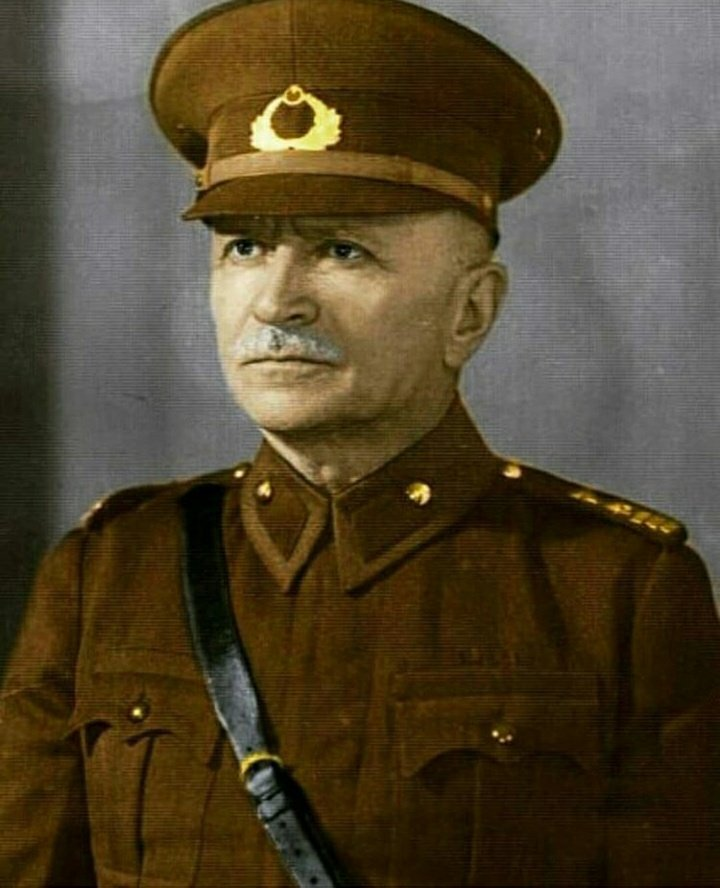
Lieutenant General Türkkan (c. 1933–1935)

== Sources ==
- Public Record Office, London. F. O./371
- Emel Esin, Mecca The Blessed, Medinah The Radiant (London, 1963), p. 190
