= Louise Vautour =

Canadian musician

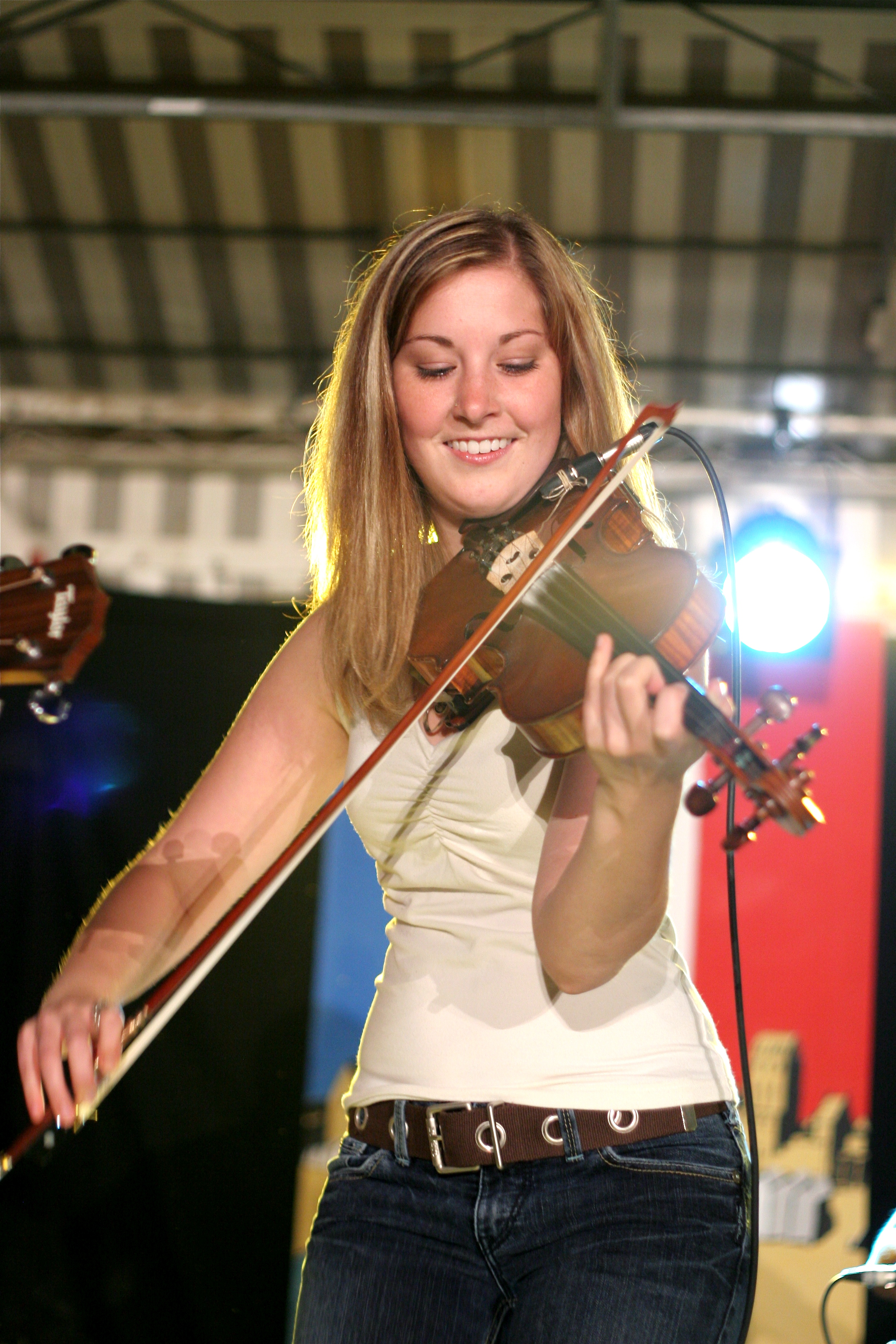
- Vautour in 2008

Background information
- Origin: Bathurst, New Brunswick, Canada
- Genres: Celtic; Irish
- Occupations: Fiddler, fiddle teacher
- Instruments: Fiddle, piano, voice
- Website: http://myspace.com/louisevautour

Louise Vautour (born in Bathurst, New Brunswick) is a Canadian musician.

== Career ==
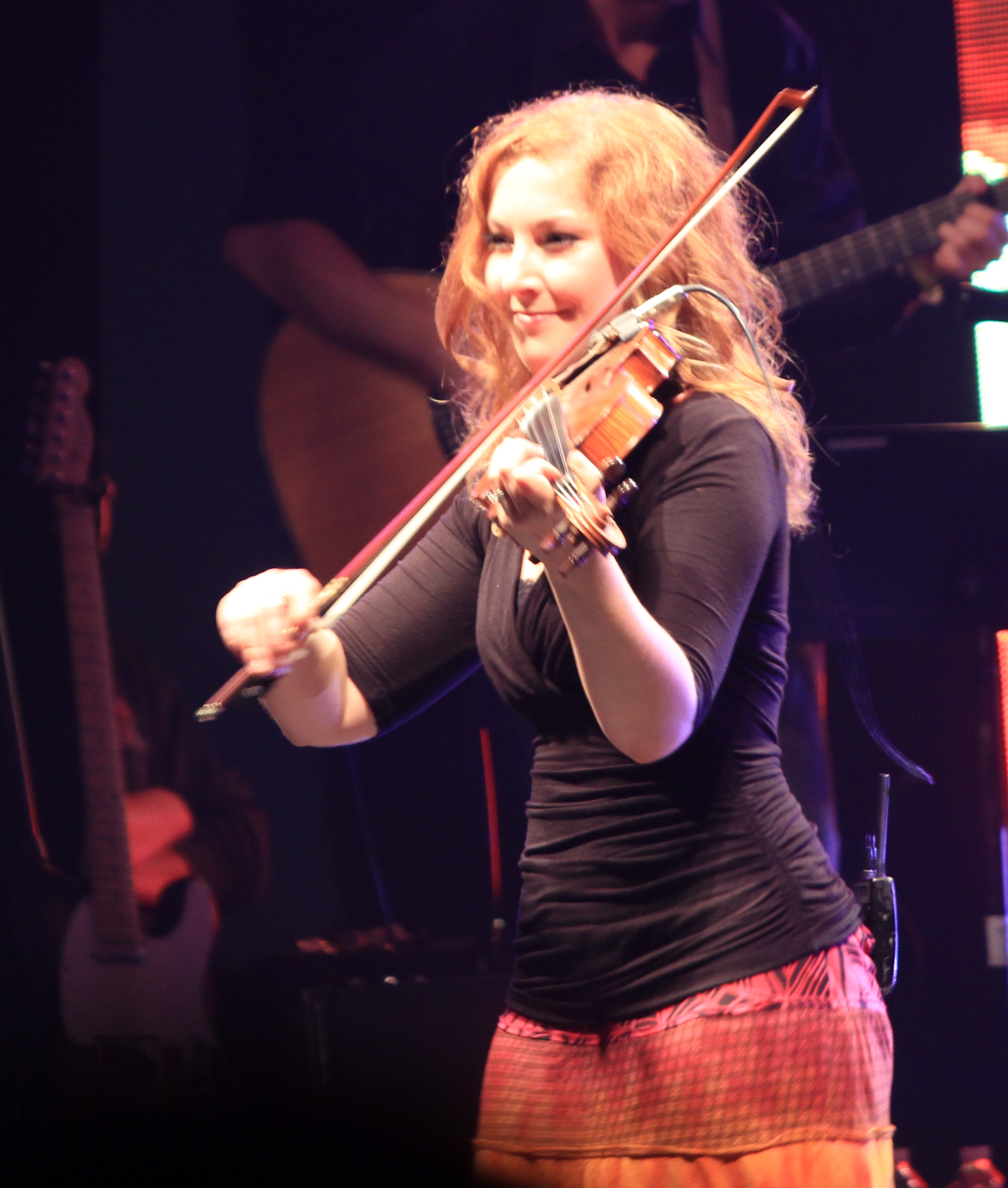
Louise Vautour at the Festival Interceltique de Lorient in 2012

Vautour took music and dance lessons from an early age but only began learning the fiddle at age 13. In 2001, she moved to Dublin, Ireland to study music. She moved back to Bathurst a year later and started a fiddle school. In 2004, she joined the band Ode à l'Acadie. In 2012, she participated in the Festival Interceltique de Lorient as the first artist to inaugurate the Pavilion of Acadia. She was part of the festival twice before in 2008 and 2011. As of January 2016 she was living in Ottawa, Ontario.

== Discography ==
- Traces (2009)

== See also ==
- Festival interceltique de Lorient
- Acadia
- Fiddle
- Bathurst, New Brunswick
