= Ruddington railway station =

Former railway station in Nottinghamshire, England

Ruddington
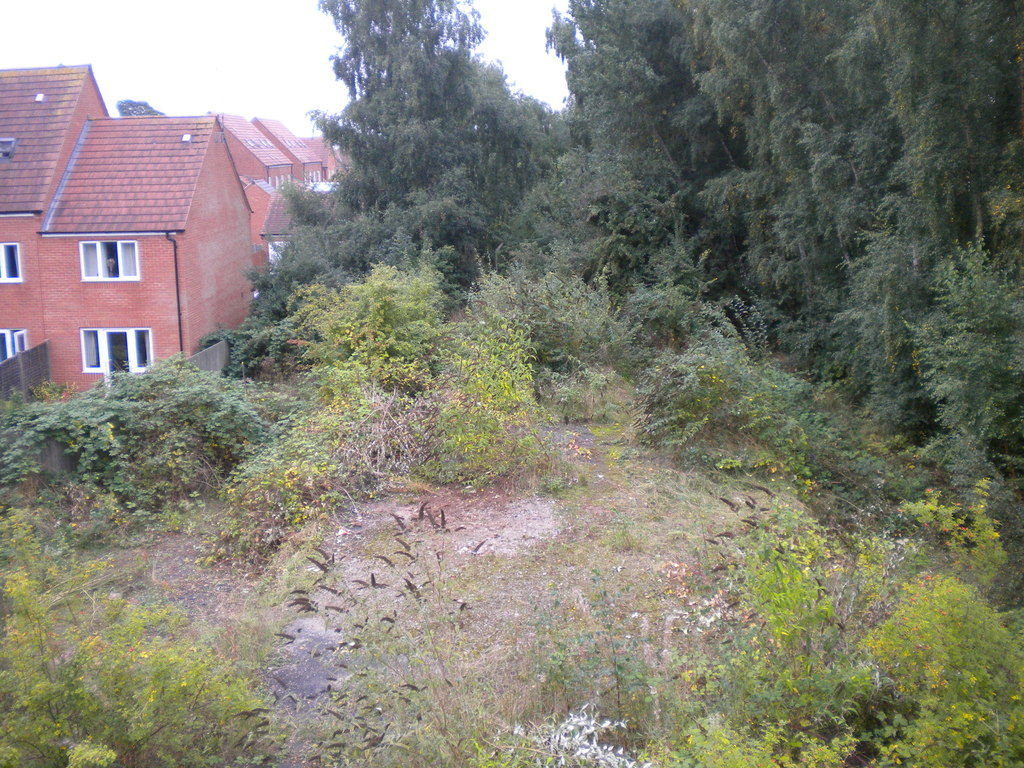

General information
- Location: Ruddington, Rushcliffe; England
- Coordinates: 52.89528°N 1.15861°W
- Platforms: 2

Other information
- Status: Disused

History
- Original company: Great Central Railway
- Pre-grouping: Great Central Railway
- Post-grouping: London and North Eastern Railway; British Railways

Key dates
- 15 March 1899: opened
- 4 March 1963: closed
Location

Ruddington is a disused railway station on the Great Central Main Line south of Nottingham. The line had branches that ran to the now decommissioned Ruddington Depot.

It was originally a standard GCR country island type station, like those surviving at Quorn and Woodhouse and Rothley, accessed from a road overbridge. The station buildings have been demolished though the island platform still survives. Just south of the station is where the northern end of the Great Central Railway (Nottingham) starts. The station opened 15 March 1899 and closed to passengers on 4 March 1963, though passenger trains continued to pass through until closure of the line on 3 May 1969. Goods trains continued until the 1980s.

During WW2 a new railway station, Ruddington Factory Halt railway station, was constructed at Ruddington Depot

The Great Central Railway (Nottingham) have opened a station at Ruddington Fields on the site of the Ministry of Defence Depot, close to Rushcliffe Country Park.

In March 2021, a bid was submitted to restore the Great Central Railway from Leicester to Ruddington as part of the third round of the Department for Transport Restoring Your Railway fund.

Preceding station	Disused railways	Following station
Rushcliffe Halt; Line and station closed	Great Central Railway; London Extension	Nottingham Arkwright Street; Line and station closed
