= John Sharpe (cricketer) =

English cricketer and footballer

Cricket information
- Batting: Right-handed
- Bowling: Right-arm fast-medium

International information
- National side: England
- Test debut: 11 August 1890 v Australia
- Last Test: 3 February 1892 v Australia

Career statistics
Competition	Test	First-class
Matches	3	82
Runs scored	44	657
Batting average	22.00	8.53
100s/50s	0/0	0/0
Top score	26	26
Balls bowled	975	14,855
Wickets	11	338
Bowling average	27.72	16.06
5 wickets in innings	1	22
10 wickets in match	0	7
Best bowling	6/84	9/47
Catches/stumpings	2/–	48/–
- Source: CricInfo, 11 May 2023

Jack Sharpe
Personal information
- Full name: John William Sharpe
- Date of birth: 9 December 1866
- Place of birth: Ruddington, England
- Date of death: 1936 (aged 69–70)
- Position: Forward

Senior career*
Years	Team	Apps	(Gls)
1889–1890	Notts County	3	(0)
- * Club domestic league appearances and goals

John William Sharpe (9 December 1866 – 19 June 1936) was a bowler who was George Lohmann's partner in the formidable Surrey sides that dominated the first years of the official cricket County Championship. However, because softer and more primitive wickets meant backup bowlers were often unnecessary, Sharpe could never get into form once William Lockwood began developing as a bowler late in 1891, and his county career was, for his time, quite short despite some notable successes in Australia.

Though born at Ruddington in Nottinghamshire to the cricketer Samuel Sharpe, Sharpe was overlooked by his native county in the 1880s when bowlers such as Shaw and Attewell could do everything needed to win matches, and he qualified for Surrey in the late 1880s. He emerged in 1889 with 5 for 5 against Oxford University, but was always overshadowed by Lohmann in purely county cricket.

However, in 1890 Sharpe developed so much that he took 102 wickets in county matches for just 12.08 each – beating Lohmann in the averages. Because of his superb work in the "short spells of fine weather" (Wisden 1891) it was thought Sharpe was the best hard-wicket bowler in England. In 1891, Sharpe fully maintained his reputation for three months, with 9 for 47 on a bumpy wicket against Middlesex being outstanding, but he fell off in August as Lockwood showed some deadly form. However, his reputation on hard wickets meant he was already an automatic choice for the 1891/1892 Ashes tour and he worked remarkably hard – often with considerable success, as when he took 6 for 84 off 51 overs in the First Test at the MCG.

In 1892, though, Sharpe could never get into form and he was dropped from the Surrey side long before the season ended. Though he was recalled in 1893 when Richardson was injured, he did nothing and Surrey released him at the end of the year. He played for Nottinghamshire a couple of times in 1894, but any hopes he would strengthen their weakening bowling were destroyed very quickly: he took only ten wickets at 28.40 under conditions tremendously favourable to bowlers, and retired at the then-remarkably young age of 28.

Sharpe bowled fast-medium and could make the ball break back to an unusual degree on hard pitches. His extra-fast yorker was often deadly. Having lost an eye, he had no pretensions as a batsman, but he was quite active in the field for a player in that time.

As footballer he played in the Football League for Notts County. He died at Ruddington in 1936.
