= Philo L. Mills =

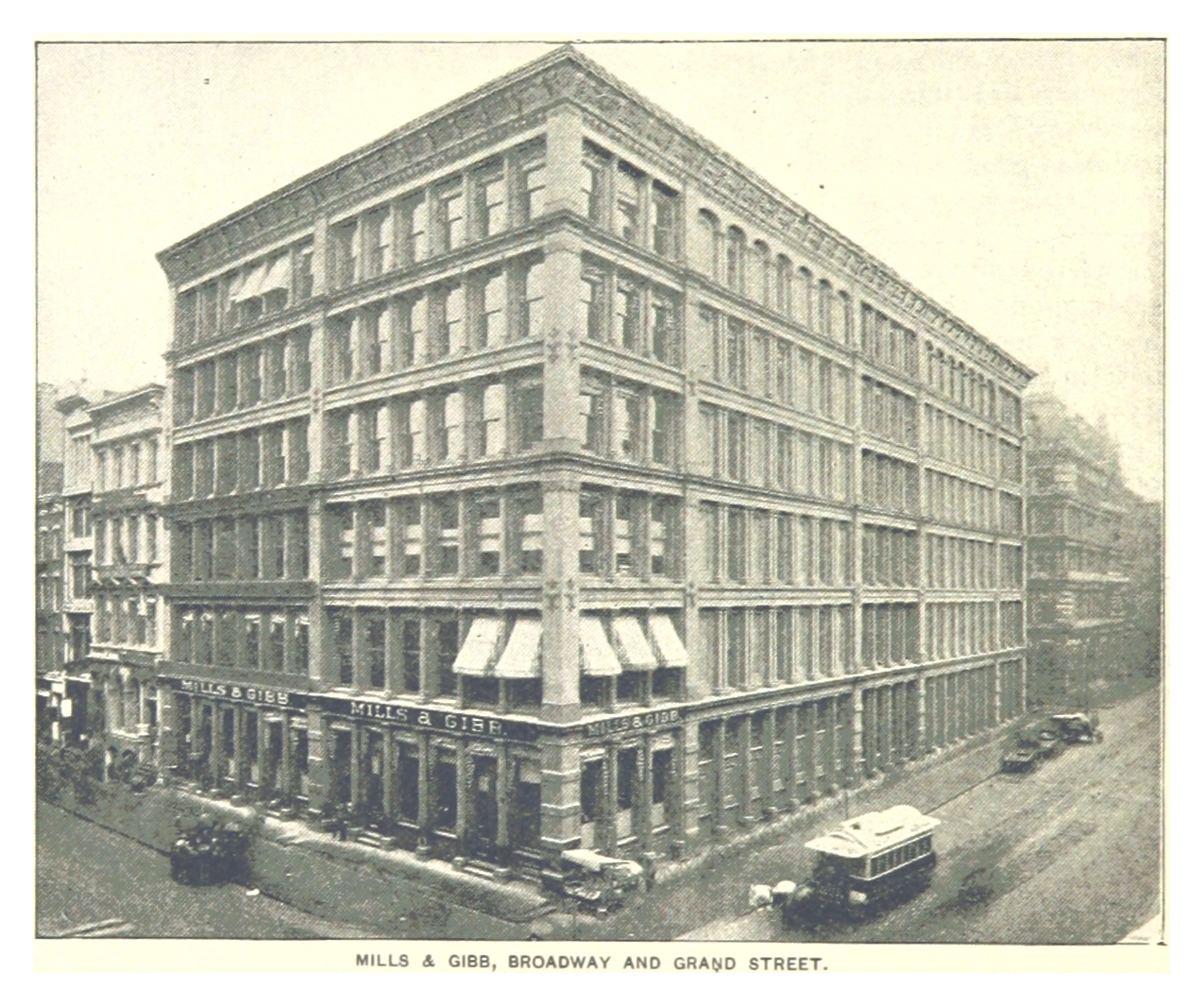
Mills & Gibb building at 462 Broadway, Lower Manhattan (1893)

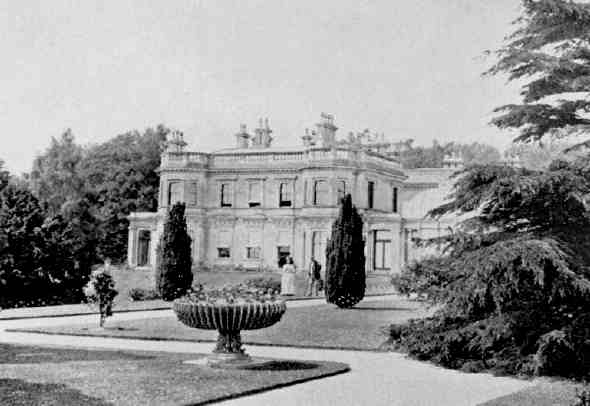
Ruddington Hall (1900)

Philo Laos Mills (1832, New York City - August 21, 1905) was the cofounder of the dry good house, Mills & Gibb. He had been partners with John Gibb for over 40 years. As a young man, he entered the employ of E. S. Jafiray & Company, and after several promotions, became buyer for the lace department. In 1865, with Gibb, he formed the firm of Mills & Gibb, incorporating in 1903. Mills then moved to England, became a British subject and took charge of all the foreign business of the concern. He resided in Ruddington and served as High Sheriff of Nottinghamshire in 1897. His home at Ruddington Hall included a noted stock farm. A generous local benefactor, he bred prize-winning pedigree cattle, pigs and shire horses. An article appeared in Country Life, 1903 in praise of 'Livestock at Ruddington Hall'. Game birds, large white Yorkshire pigs and rams were all kept at Home Farm in Landmere. Their fame led to buyers from Britain, Russia, Poland, Austria, Canada, Australia. He was President of the Nottingham Young Men's Christian Association. Although 73 years of age at the time of his death, he had been in excellent health. Mills, who was childless, was survived by his wife (d. 1906), who had greatly helped in his philanthropic work.
