= Richard Henson =

Richard Henson may refer to:

- Richard Henson (cricketer), English cricketer
- Richard A. Henson, American test pilot
- Richard Henson (neurobiologist), professor of cognitive neuroscience
