= Ruth Edwards =

British politician (born 1984)

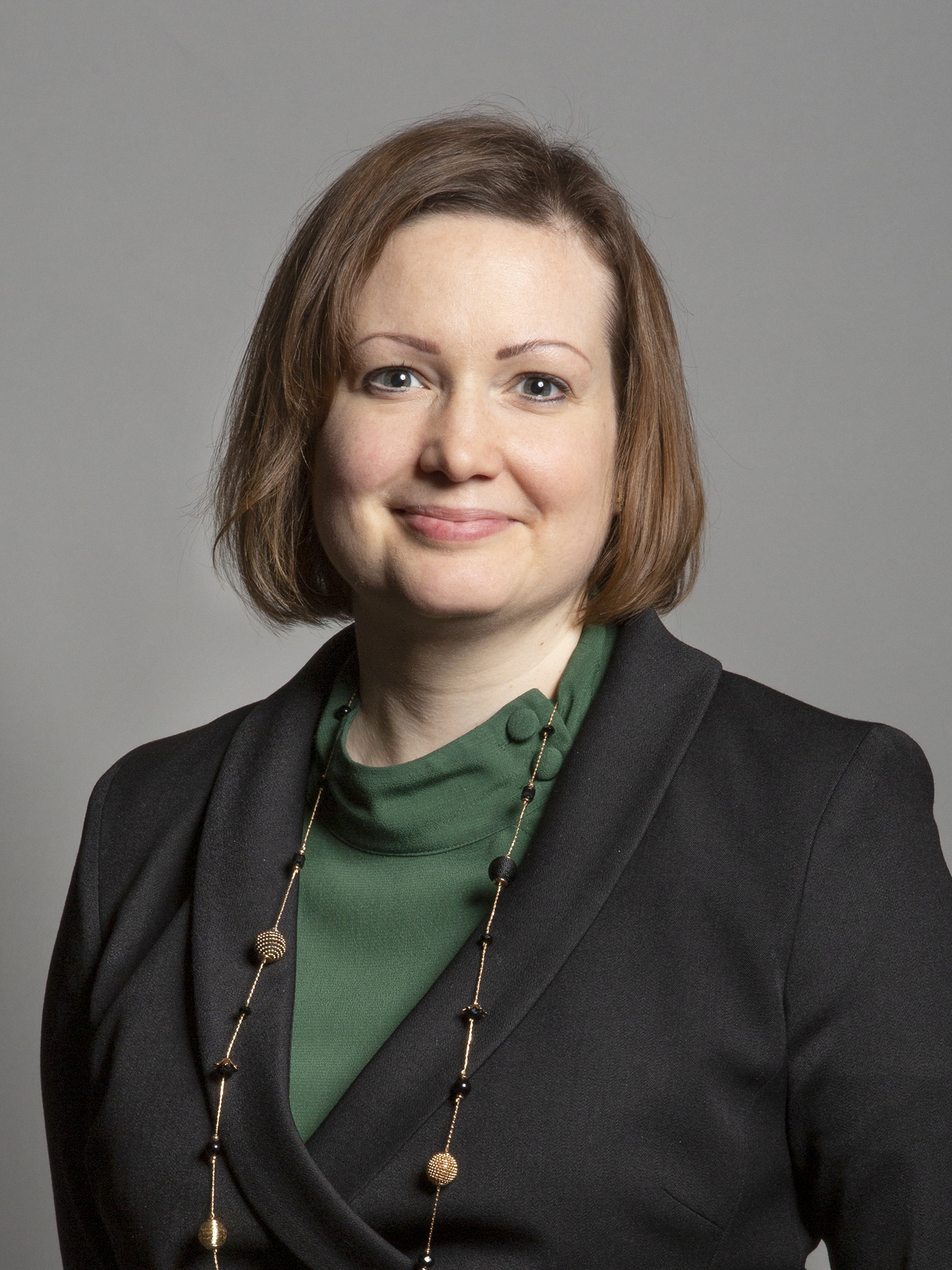
- Official portrait, 2019

Assistant Government Whip
- In office 16 February 2023 – 25 April 2024
- Prime Minister: Rishi Sunak
- Preceded by: Stuart Anderson
- Succeeded by: Paul Holmes

Lord Commissioner of the Treasury
- In office 7 February 2023 – 16 February 2023
- Prime Minister: Rishi Sunak

Member of Parliament for Rushcliffe
- In office 12 December 2019 – 30 May 2024
- Preceded by: Kenneth Clarke
- Succeeded by: James Naish

Personal details
- Born: Ruth Rosamond Davis; 11 May 1984 (age 42) Bristol, England
- Party: Conservative
- Spouse: Owen Edwards (m. 2019)
- Education: London School of Theology (BA); University of Bristol (MSc)

Ruth Rosamond Edwards (née Davis; born 11 May 1984) is a British politician who served as the Member of Parliament (MP) for Rushcliffe from the 2019 general election until the 2024 election. A member of the Conservative Party, she worked in cybersecurity policy prior to her political career.

== Early life and career ==
Edwards was born in Bristol as the daughter of Christopher Charles Davis and Nelly Davis. She was privately educated at Clifton High School, Bristol, before studying theology at the London School of Theology, where she gained a First Class BA in Theology. She went on to complete a master's MSc degree in International Development and Security at the University of Bristol, achieving a Distinction. After graduation, she worked as a parliamentary researcher for then Shadow Minister for Home Affairs and Counter Terrorism Crispin Blunt. She then worked as a strategy consultant for Deloitte from 2010 to 2012.

Edwards subsequently worked as a specialist for the Home Affairs Select Committee from 2012 to 2013. She then completed a crime and justice research fellowship at the think tank Policy Exchange in 2013. She left Policy Exchange to become Head of Cyber, Justice and Emergency Services at the trade association TechUK, where she worked from 2013 to 2015. After this, Edwards worked as the head of commercial strategy and public policy for the telecommunications company BT from 2015 to 2019.

== Parliamentary career ==
Edwards stood as the Conservative candidate for the Liberal Democrat-held Ceredigion seat at the 2017 general election, where she came fourth.

In 2019 Edwards was selected as the candidate for the seat of Rushcliffe on 16 October 2019. The seat had previously been represented by Father of the House, and former Chancellor of the Exchequer Kenneth Clarke since 1970, who announced his retirement on 27 June. Edwards was elected with a majority of 7,643 in the 2019 general election. She was a member of the Home Affairs Select Committee from March 2020 to November 2021.

Edwards was the Parliamentary Private Secretary to the Secretary of State for Scotland Alister Jack between February 2020 and July 2022. She resigned from the role in July 2022 in protest against Prime Minister Boris Johnson's handling of the Chris Pincher scandal. She accused him of leading a government which "turned a blind eye to allegations of sexual assault within its own ranks."

In 2020 Edwards voted not to call on the Government to develop and implement a plan to eliminate the substantial majority of transport emissions by 2030. Ruth Edwards has generally voted against measures to prevent climate change.

In 2023, Edwards served as a junior Government Whip in the Department for Work and Pensions, before moving to serve as the junior whip in Department for the Environment, Food and Rural Affairs, and the Department for Health and Social Care.

Outside of her parliamentary role, she was also an adviser to the HR payroll software company MHR, for which Mongoose Bridges, a company that she co-owns with her husband, received £5,000 a month between May 2021 and December 2021.

Edwards endorsed Rishi Sunak during the July–September 2022 Conservative Party leadership election. She lost her bid for re-election in the 2024 election.

== Post-parliamentary career ==
Since her defeat at the 2024 general election, Edwards has worked as a Partner for communications agency 10 Years Ahead.

== Personal life ==
She married Owen Edwards in July 2019. They met during her 2017 general election campaign, when he was the chairman of Ceredigion's Conservative Association.

Parliament of the United Kingdom
Preceded by Kenneth Clarke	Member of Parliament for Rushcliffe; 2019–2024	Succeeded by James Naish
