= Samuel Sharpe (cricketer) =

English cricketer

Personal information
- Full name: Samuel Sharpe
- Born: 13 January 1839; Ruddington, Nottinghamshire, England
- Died: 5 November 1924 (aged 85); Ruddington, Nottinghamshire, England
- Batting: Right-handed
- Bowling: Right-arm medium
- Relatives: John Sharpe (son)

Domestic team information
- Years: Team
- 1868: Nottinghamshire

Career statistics
Competition	First-class
Matches	2
Runs scored	29
Batting average	9.66
100s/50s	0/0
Top score	13
Catches/stumpings	3/–
- Source: Cricinfo, 20 May 2012

Samuel Sharpe (13 January 1839 – 5 November 1924) was an English cricketer. Sharpe was a right-handed batsman who bowled right-arm medium pace. He was born at Ruddington, Nottinghamshire.

Sharpe made two first-class appearances for Nottinghamshire in 1868, against Lancashire and Yorkshire, with both matches played at Trent Bridge. In his first match, Lancashire won the toss and elected to bat first, making 74 all out. In response, Nottinghamshire made 296 all out in their first-innings, with Sharpe scoring 13 runs before he was dismissed by William Hickton. Lancashire were then dismissed for 148 in their second-innings, handing Nottinghamshire victory by an innings and 74 runs. In his second match, Yorkshire won the toss and elected to bat, making 213 all out. Responding in their first-innings, Nottinghamshire were dismissed for just 60, with Sharpe himself opening the batting and being dismissed for 5 runs by Roger Iddison. Forced to follow-on in their second-innings, Nottinghamshire made 158 all out, with Sharpe being dismissed for 11 runs by Tom Emmett. Yorkshire went on to win the match by 9 wickets.

He died at the village of his birth on 5 November 1924. His son, John, played Test cricket for England.
