= MHR =

MHR may refer to:

- Meadow Mari language of Russia (ISO 639 code: mhr)
- Member of the Australian House of Representatives
- Member of the New Zealand House of Representatives
- Montpellier Hérault Rugby, a prominent French rugby union club
- Sacramento Mather Airport, California
- Mediterranean Historical Review, academic journal
- MHR (formerly MidlandHR), a UK software and outsourcing company
- Mike Harmon Racing, American stock car racing team
- Monster Hunter Rise, a video game

== Rail transport ==
- Market Harborough railway station, Leicestershire, England
- Matheran Hill Railway, Maharashtra, India, a heritage railway
- Mid Hants Railway, England, a heritage railway
- Muswell Hill Railway, London
