= Ruddington Factory Halt railway station =

Former railway station in Nottinghamshire, England

Ruddington Factory Halt

General information
- Location: Ruddington, Rushcliffe; England
- Platforms: 1

Other information
- Status: Disused

History
- Original company: ministry of defence
- Post-grouping: ministry of defense

Key dates
- 1 September 1941: Opened
- c.1948: Closed
Location

Ruddington Factory Halt was a railway station opened in 1941 but closed circa 1948. The station was opened to serve a new factory within the Ruddington Ordnance Depot. The site is now occupied by Rushcliffe Country Park in Ruddington just near the Great Central railway Nottingham

Preceding station	Disused railways	Following station
Ruddington; Line and station closed	London & North Eastern Railway; Great Central Main Line	Terminus

== See also ==
Bombs to Butterflies
