= Ruddington Hall =

Country house in Nottinghamshire, England

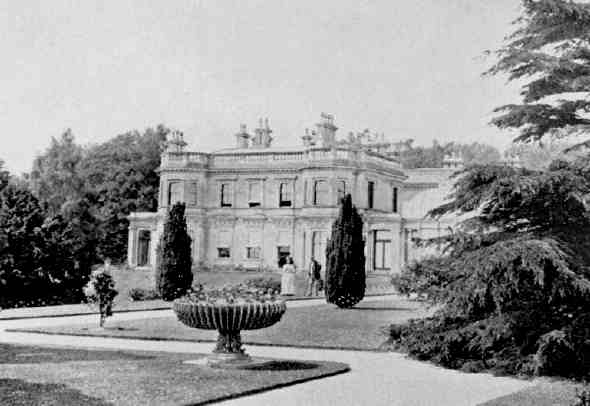
- Ruddington Hall in 1900

- Location within Nottinghamshire

General information
- Status: Completed
- Location: Ruddington Hall, Loughborough Rd, Nottingham NG11 6LL, Nottingham, England
- Coordinates: 52.9014°N 1.1383°W
- Completed: 1860
- Client: Thomas Cross
- Owner: MHR

Ruddington Hall is a country house standing in the grounds of a garden in Ruddington, Nottinghamshire, England. Ruddington Hall has been included in the art work of Nikolaus Pevsner alongside the Elizabethan Wollaton Hall and Newstead Abbey, ancestral home of Lord Byron. Pevsner described it as having a classical ethic of "calm grandeur, and monumental simplicity".

== History ==
Ruddington Hall was built in 1860, on the lower slopes of a wooded hill. It was designed as a country retreat for Thomas Cross, a wealthy industrialist and banker from Bolton. Together with his wife and some nine servants, he lived there for 19 years.

Ruddington was a centre for the production of the world-famous Nottingham lace, and in 1880 the hall was purchased by a successful American merchant, Philo Laos Mills. Mills was appointed High Sheriff of Nottinghamshire in 1897. He died in 1905, aged seventy-three.

The tradition of ownership by self-made men was continued in 1907 by a Major John Ashworth. As well as developing a flourishing timber importing business, Ashworth, Kirk & Co. Ltd, he was renowned as one of the finest riflemen in the country. Under Ashworth's ownership, the hall's boiler and fireplaces burnt each quarter thirty tons of coal.

In 1931, Ruddington Hall was purchased by Dorothea Kate Forman-Hardy, a member of Nottingham's newspaper and printing dynasty. In 1938, she added a major new extension to the rear, and in September 1940 offered the hall to the Red Cross for use as a wartime convalescent hospital. It accommodated seventy-five patients.

The hall continued as a hospital after the war, and in 1980 was purchased and converted into office premises. It was owned by British Gypsum until 1991. In 1992, Ruddington Hall was acquired by MHR, a HR and payroll software and services company.

Since 1992, further restoration work has been carried out, including ceilings, stone floors, and leaded windows. Outside the hall, iron gates and rail have been replaced, drainage improved, many new trees and shrubs planted, and old topiary and paths restored.
