= Listed buildings in Ruddington =

Ruddington is a civil parish in the Rushcliffe district of Nottinghamshire, England. The parish contains 23 listed buildings that are recorded in the National Heritage List for England. All the listed buildings are designated at Grade II, the lowest of the three grades, which is applied to "buildings of national importance and special interest". The parish contains the village of Ruddington and the surrounding area. During the 19th century it was an important centre for framework knitting, and a number of workshops and workers' cottages have survived and are listed, some forming part of a museum. Most of the other listed buildings are houses, cottages and associated structures, and the others include a church, church buildings, former schools, a greenhouse, a war memorial and a telephone kiosk.

== Buildings ==
Name and location	Photograph	Date	Notes
Church Side; 52.89285°N 1.15111°W	—	Mid 16th century	A pair of cottages combined into one house, it is timber-framed with red brick nogging, encased in red brick, rendered at the base, with a partial stone plinth, and a slate roof. There are two storeys and seven bays, and a recessed lean-to on the left. The house contains two doorways, one under a segmental arch, and casement windows, one tripartite.
The Hermitage; 52.89313°N 1.15004°W	—	16th century	A house, later used for other purposes, it was remodelled in 1708, and later extended. The house is in brick and stone, on a deep stone plinth, with two large external stone chimney stacks, a floor band, an eaves band, and a tile roof with a coped gable and kneelers on the left. There are two storeys, attics and cellars, two bays, and a later rear wing. The windows are casements, some tripartite, and there is an initialled and dated stone plaque.
42 Easthorpe Street; 52.89334°N 1.14582°W		Mid 17th century	Originally timber framed, the house is in red brick with a pantile roof. There are two storeys and six bays. It contains two doorways, one with a fanlight, and casement windows, one tripartite, and one with a segmental head.
Manor Farmhouse; 52.89221°N 1.15022°W		Early 18th century	A house, later divided into two, in slurried red brick, with floor bands, dentilled, raised and dogtooth eaves, and a tile roof with brick coped gables and kneelers on the left and at the rear. There are two storeys, four bays, and two rear wings. On the front are two doorways with fanlights, and casement windows.
South Manor and wall 52.89325°N 1.15292°W	—	18th century	A house that was altered and extended in 1852 by T. C. Hine and later used for other purposes, it is in stuccoed red brick on a painted plinth, with a hipped slate roof and eaves on decorative brackets. There are two storeys and five bays, the outer bays projecting, the ground floor with banded rustication, and with rusticated quoin strips to the upper floor. The ground floor of the inner three bays projects under a balustrade. It contains three round arches, each with a keystone and two Doric columns. To the right and recessed is a three-storey turret, and to the rear right is the original wing, with three storeys and three bays, containing a Doric portico, with an entablature and a dentilled cornice. Along the front is a vermiculated stone wall with a balustrade, extending for about 24 metres (79 ft).
Ruddington House; 52.89230°N 1.14739°W	—	c, 1770	The house, which was later extended, is in colourwashed stucco on a stone plinth, with a modillion eaves cornice and a hipped slate roof. The original block has three storeys and three bays. In the outer bays are two-storey bow windows, each with a modillion cornice. In the centre is a doorway flanked by pilasters with fluted imposts extending to form a frieze, and with a decorative fanlight. Over the pilasters are fluted brackets with a patera carrying a modillion pediment. The windows are sashes. To the right is a later two-storey two-bay wing, and to the left is another two-storey two-bay wing.
Ice House, Copper Top; 52.89367°N 1.15153°W	—	Late 18th century	The ice house, later a store, is in red brick. It has a round-arched entrance with a brick hood mould, buttresses on the sides, and a passage leading to a domed circular chamber.
Easthorpe House; 52.89402°N 1.14136°W		Early 19th century	A house later used for other purposes, in colourwashed stucco, on a painted plinth, with a hipped slate roof and overhanging eaves on paired brackets. There are two storeys and a front of five bays. The centre is bowed with a conical roof, and it has a central arch with a moulded surround and a keystone, containing a doorway with a fanlight. To the left and recessed is a two-storey single-bay wing with external iron steps leading to a doorway. The windows are sashes. The garden front has twelve bays, the middle bay broad and pedimented.
Stable block, Easthorpe House; 52.89452°N 1.14075°W	—	Early 19th century	The stable block, later used for other purposes, is in rendered red brick with hipped slate roofs. There are two storeys and an L-shaped plan, with a range of five bays, and a projecting wing of four bays. The main range has a central doorway over which is a gable, to the right is a doorway with a fanlight, the windows are casements, and all the openings have wedge lintels. The wing contains an arched doorway with a hood mould, two large doorways with semicircular fanlights and hood moulds, a casement window and a sash window.
Former Framework Knitters' Workshop Behind 11 High Street; 52.89228°N 1.14898°W	—	Early 19th century	The workshop, later a store, is in red brick with a slate roof. There are two storeys and four bays. The windows are casements with up to eight lights, and the doorway on the far right is under a segmental arch.
Former Framework Knitters' Workshop Behind Fern Villas; 52.89109°N 1.14980°W	—	Early 19th century	The workshop, later an office, is in whitewashed red brick with a slate roof. There are two storeys and five bays. The windows are casements with up to seven lights. In the right gable end is an upper floor doorway with a fanlight.
Former Framework Knitters' Workshop, Parkyns Street; 52.89114°N 1.15017°W	—	Early 19th century	The workshop, later an office, is in red brick with a slate roof. There are two storeys and four bays. The windows are casements with up to eight lights. To the left is a single-storey two-bay lean-to with a hipped roof, containing a doorway with a fanlight and a sash window.
Framework Knitters' cottages 52.89111°N 1.15172°W		c. 1829	The former workers' cottages, later part of a museum, are in brick with red stretchers and pink headers, and have dentilled eaves and a pantile roof. There are two storeys and attics, and originally seven bays. The windows are tripartite casements, and the ground floor windows and doorway are under segmental arches.
East Block, Framework Knitters' Museum; 52.89096°N 1.15166°W		c. 1840	The workshop is in red brick with a slate roof, and now part of a museum. There are two storeys and three bays. In the centre of the ground floor is a doorway under a segmental arch, it is flanked by nine-light casement windows, and in the upper floor are casement windows with eleven and 13 lights. Attached to the left and recessed is a two-bay lean-to.
West Block, Framework Knitters' Museum; 52.89098°N 1.15181°W		c. 1840	The buildings are in red brick, and now part of a museum. The workshop has two storeys and two bays, and a slate roof. In the ground floor is a doorway under a segmental arch, to the right is a nine-light casement window, and in the upper floor is a similar window with 15 lights. To the rear left is a single storey two-bay outbuilding with a pantile roof, and a projecting four-bay range.
Animal Pen, Easthorpe House; 52.89447°N 1.14046°W	—	Mid 19th century	The animal pen is in red brick with stone dressings and a conical slate roof, on which is a wooden glover with a lead roof and a ball finial. There is a circular plan, and the pen contains seven rectangular openings, between which are piers with rounded corners, the sills have moulded stone coping, and on the west side is a doorway.
St Peter's Rooms; 52.89213°N 1.15072°W		1852	A school, later parish rooms, in red brick on a chamfered stone plinth, with stone dressings, buttresses, a raised eaves band, and a decorative tile roof. There is a single storey, a north front of ten bays, and a west front of five bays. The outer and central bays of the north front are gabled. The central gable is coped and partly crow-stepped, it is surmounted by a gabled bellcote, and contains two doorways with pointed arches, over which is a large cartouche. The windows are casements with quoined surrounds. Over the central bay of the west front is a decorative iron bellcote with a lead roof.
Former Ruddington Free School; 52.89007°N 1.15075°W		1875	The school, later used for other purposes, it is in red brick on a plinth, with stone dressings, a chamfered band, stepped buttresses, dogtooth eaves, a tile roof with stone coped gables, and a gabled bellcote. There is a single storey and fronts of three and four bays. The windows have stone surrounds, some with flat heads, and others stepped with pointed heads. Under the bellcote is an inscribed and dated plaque.
Wall, railings and gateways, Former Ruddington Free School; 52.89217°N 1.15097°W		1875	The grounds are enclosed by a low red brick wall, partly rendered, with stone coping. Flanking the entrance, and at the east end, are square brick piers with stone coping.
St Peter's Church; 52.89289°N 1.15064°W		1887–88	The church was rebuilt, retaining part of the tower, and is in stone with tile roofs. It consists of a nave, a west porch, north and south aisles, a two-storey south porch with a stair turret, a chancel, a south vestry with a porch and a stair turret, a north organ chamber, and a northwest tower. The tower has two stages, a chamfered plinth, a moulded band, clock faces on the east and south sides, a corbel table, an embattled parapet, and a recessed spire with lucarnes.
Greenhouse, Ruddington Golf Club; 52.90505°N 1.15085°W	—	c. 1900	The greenhouse has a rectangular plan and a single storey, on a rendered base, and at the rear is a brick wall. The other sides have panels, above which are plate glass windows with small-paned opening windows above; there are eleven windows on the front and six on the sides. The sides have gables with finials, and the roof is surmounted by a clerestory with finials. Inside, there are ornate cast iron columns.
War memorial 52.89262°N 1.15014°W		c. 1918	The war memorial is in a memorial garden and is in Portland stone. It stands on three oval steps with moulded edging, and has a moulded plinth and a rectangular base, on which is a column with a decorative capital. On the front of the column is a sword, and on its top is a cross, both in copper gilt.
Telephone kiosk 52.89250°N 1.15000°W		1935	The K6 type telephone kiosk in Church Street was designed by Giles Gilbert Scott. Constructed in cast iron with a square plan and a dome, it has three unperforated crowns in the top panels.
