= St Peter's Church, Ruddington =

Church in Nottinghamshire, England

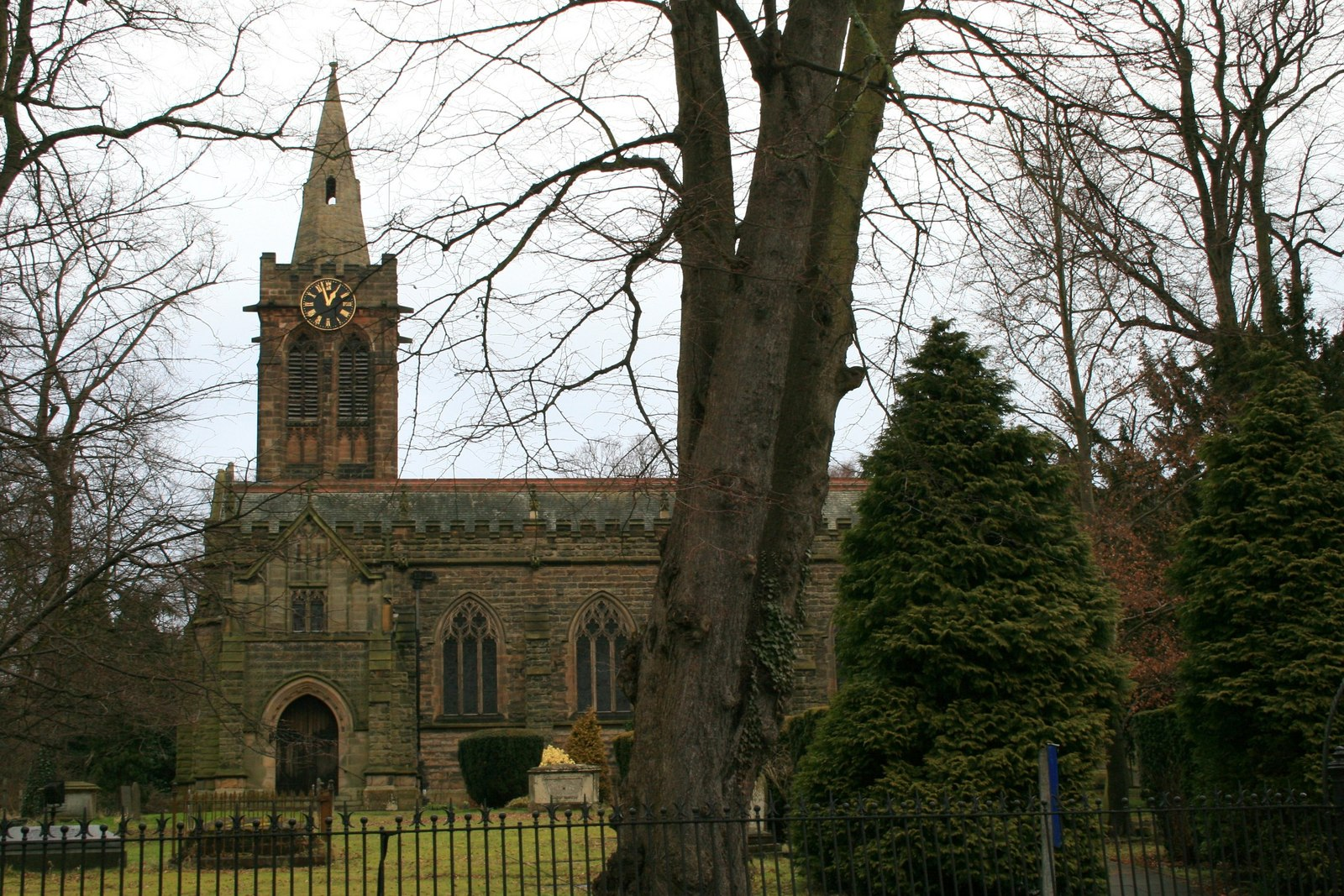
- St Peter's Church, Ruddington
- 52°53′34″N 1°9′03″W
- OS grid reference: SK 57238 33158
- Location: Church Street, Ruddington, Nottinghamshire NG11 6HA
- Country: England
- Denomination: Church of England
- Churchmanship: Broad Church

History
- Dedication: St. Peter

Architecture
- Heritage designation: Grade II listed building
- Architect(s): Bell and Roper
- Completed: 1888

Administration
- Province: York
- Diocese: Diocese of Southwell
- Parish: Ruddington

Clergy
- Vicar: Revd Andrew Buchanan

St. Peter's Church is a Church of England church in Ruddington, Nottinghamshire.

== History ==
The chapel of St. Mary dating from 1459 became the parish church when St. Peter's Church, Flawford nearby was demolished in 1773.

The church was repaired in 1718, and was rebuilt in 1824 at a cost of £1,100 (equivalent to £104,413 in 2025), except the chancel and steeple, which are the only remaining parts of the ancient fabric. In 1773 its burial ground was consecrated, and enclosed with part of the materials of Flawford church.

Except for the tower, the rest of the church was rebuilt by Bell and Roper of Manchester. Work started on 1 June 1887 and the new church costing £12,000 (equivalent to £1,350,000 in 2025) was consecrated by Rt. Revd. George Ridding, Bishop of Southwell, on 1 November 1888.

It is thought that the font comes from the medieval church at Flawford.

== Organ ==
The 3 manual pipe organ dates from 1908 and is by Brindley & Foster of Sheffield.

=== Organists ===
- Alfred Cook 1900 - 1933 (joint organist and choirmaster)
- Albert Cook 1900 - 1933 (organist, son of Alfred)
- Eric A. Peach 1933 - 1949 (afterwards organist at St Mary's Church, Wymeswold)
- Hugh Wayman 1949 - 1950 (dismissed by the vicar)
- B.L. Buxton ca. 1950
- Douglas H. Madden 1951 - 1953 (formerly assistant organist at St Mary's Church, Nottingham, afterwards organist at St Peter's Church, Nottingham)
- Peter. S. Shepherd c. 1972 – c. 1974
- Arthur Smedley 1978 - 1988 (formerly organist at St Nicholas Church, Nottingham)
- Alan Mitchell 1988 - ???? (formerly organist at St Margaret’s Church, Aspley)

== Clock ==
A new turret clock by G. & F. Cope of Nottingham was installed in the tower in 1888.

== See also ==
- Listed buildings in Ruddington
