= St Peter's Church, Flawford =

Defunct church in Flawford, Nottinghamshire

St. Peter's Church, Flawford
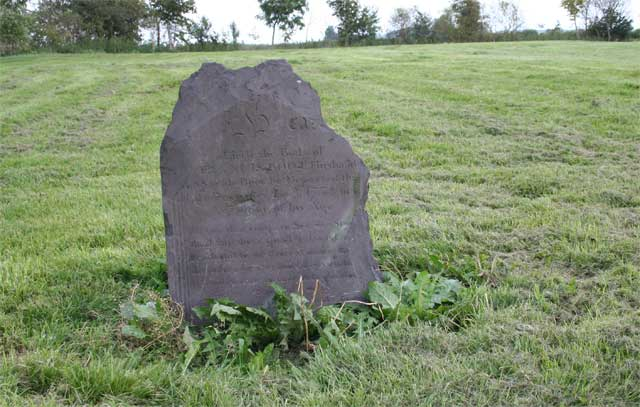
- St. Peter's Church, Flawford
- 52°53′35″N 1°7′10″W
- Country: England
- Denomination: Church of England
- Website: flawford.org.uk/index.htm

History
- Dedication: St. Peter

Architecture
- Closed: 1718
- Demolished: 1779

Administration
- Province: York
- Diocese: Diocese of Southwell
- Parish: Flawford

St Peter's Church was a Church of England church in Flawford, Nottinghamshire.

== History ==
The church is famous for the discovery of three Nottingham alabaster figures, representing Our Lady, St. Peter, and a bishop which were discovered during the demolition of the church in 1779. They now form part of the collection in Nottingham Castle Museum. It is thought that they would have been hidden around 1539 during the Dissolution of the Monasteries.

The chapel of St. Mary in Ruddington replaced it as the parish church when St. Peter's Church, Flawford was demolished in 1779, and took the dedication becoming St. Peter's Church, Ruddington.

In 1967 Nottinghamshire County Council authorised the Ruddington Local History Society to excavate the site of the church. Excavations took place from 1967 to 1984.
