= John Gibb (businessman) =

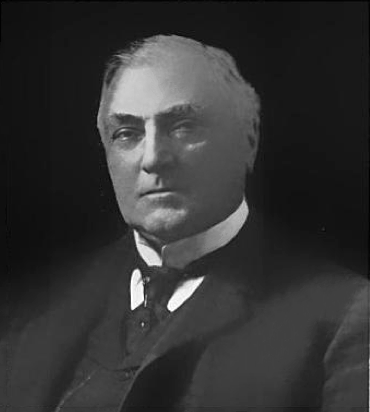
John Gibb (1829-1905)

John Gibb (March 14, 1829 – August 27, 1905) was a cofounder of the dry goods house of Mills & Gibb.

== Biography ==
Gibb was born on March 14, 1829, in Forfarshire, Scotland. He left his father's farm at the age of 14 to apprentice for four years in a draper's shop at Montrose, Angus. Later, he went to London and was in the largest wholesale house in that city. In 1850, he became acquainted with a member of the firm of E. S. Jaffray & Company, who induced him to come to New York, where became a buyer of embroideries and white goods.

In 1865, he formed the firm of Mills & Gibb with Philo L. Mills, with whom he remained partners for over forty years. When the company incorporated in 1903, Gibb became president, while Mills, vice-president, moved to England to take charge of the company's foreign business. Gibb was a director of the Brooklyn Trust Company, a member of the advisory council of the Thrift Savings, Loan & Building Fund, the Brooklyn Club, Long Island Historical Society, Penatquit-Corinthian Yacht, Merchants‘ Central, Hamilton and Olympic Clubs, the Metropolitan Museum of Art, and the American Museum of Natural History. He was for a term president of the Brooklyn Park Commission and was a trustee for YMCA.

== Personal life ==
In 1852, he married Mrs. Harriet Balston (died in 1878). Seven years later, he married Sarah D. Mackay. He died in 1905 at his country residence, "Afterglow" in Islip, Long Island. Five sons survived him, J. Richmond, Arthur, Walter, Elmer and Louis and four daughters, all married.
