= 300 Park Avenue South =

Building in Manhattan, New York

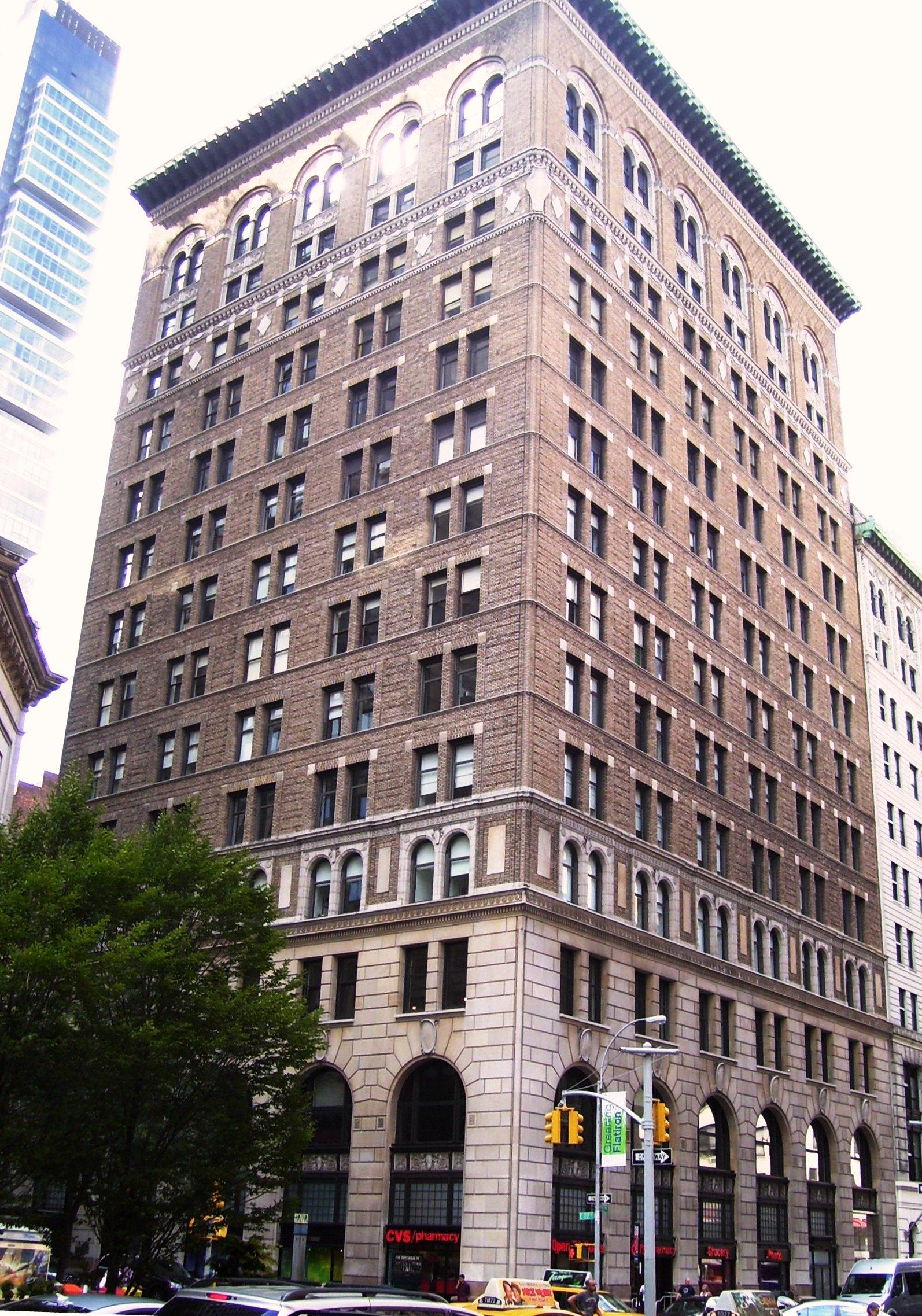
- 300 Park Avenue South
- Interactive map of the 300 Park Avenue South area
- Former names: Mills & Gibb building

General information
- Type: Commercial
- Architectural style: Beaux-Arts
- Location: 300 Park Avenue South, Manhattan, New York, 10010
- Coordinates: 40°44′23.5″N 73°59′13″W
- Completed: 1911

Height
- Roof: 192 feet (59 m)

Technical details
- Floor count: 16

Design and construction
- Architect: Starrett & van Vleck
- Developer: Mills & Gibb

300 Park Avenue South (previously the Mills & Gibb Building and currently also known as The Creative Arts Center) is a building on the northwest corner of East 22nd Street in the Flatiron District/Gramercy Park neighborhoods of Manhattan, New York City.

== History ==
The 16-story Beaux-Arts style building was to a design by Starrett & van Vleck. Built in 1911 for Mills & Gibb on the site of the old Fourth Avenue Presbyterian Church, it boasted a frontage of 114 feet (35 m) on Fourth Avenue and 100 feet (30 m) on Twenty-second Street. The Beaux-Arts style building was completed in 1911. Its automatic sprinklers were supplied with water by two steel pressure tanks of 9,000 US gallons (34,000 L; 7,500 imp gal) capacity each, located in a fireproof house on the roof. They were connected together, with gate and check valves at each, and discharge through a dead riser running down through the building to the basement. The ornamental iron partitions glazed with wire mesh glass that separated each floor from the main stairway were furnished by the Winslow Brothers' Company. "Richardson" seamless kalamein fire doors protected the openings on the passenger elevator shaft. furnished by the J. F. Blanchard Company, these doors were finished with Verdi antique enamel. The entire steel frame was fireproofed with terra cotta hollow tile furnished by Henry Maurer & Son, New York City.

It is currently occupied by the Smithsonian Institution's New York Research Center, the New York State Council on the Arts, Wilhelmina Models, FanDuel, and the Whitney Museum of American Art. Rockrose Development Corporation is the landlord.
