= William T. Evans =

American art collector

- Born: c. 1843; Ireland
- Died: November 25, 1918; Glen Ridge, New Jersey, United States
- Occupations: Art collector; dry-goods merchant
- Employer(s): Mills & Gibb
- Known for: Major donations to the Smithsonian American Art Museum and Montclair Art Museum; collection of works by Childe Hassam, J. Alden Weir, George Inness

William T. Evans (c. 1843 - November 25, 1918) was an American art collector.

== Life ==
He was born in Ireland, and grew up in Scotch Plains, New Jersey. He studied architecture at the New York Free School. He was President of the Mills & Gibb, and Mills Gibb Corporation.

He collected art by Childe Hassam, J. Alden Weir, Lillian Genth, George Inness, and Frederick Ballard Williams. He gave 160 paintings to the U.S. National Gallery (now the Smithsonian American Art Museum) in 1915, also donating a number to the Montclair Art Museum.

His letters are held at the Smithsonian's Archives of American Art.

He died at his home in Glen Ridge, New Jersey, on November 25, 1918.
