= Mills & Gibb =

New York City importing and merchandising firm

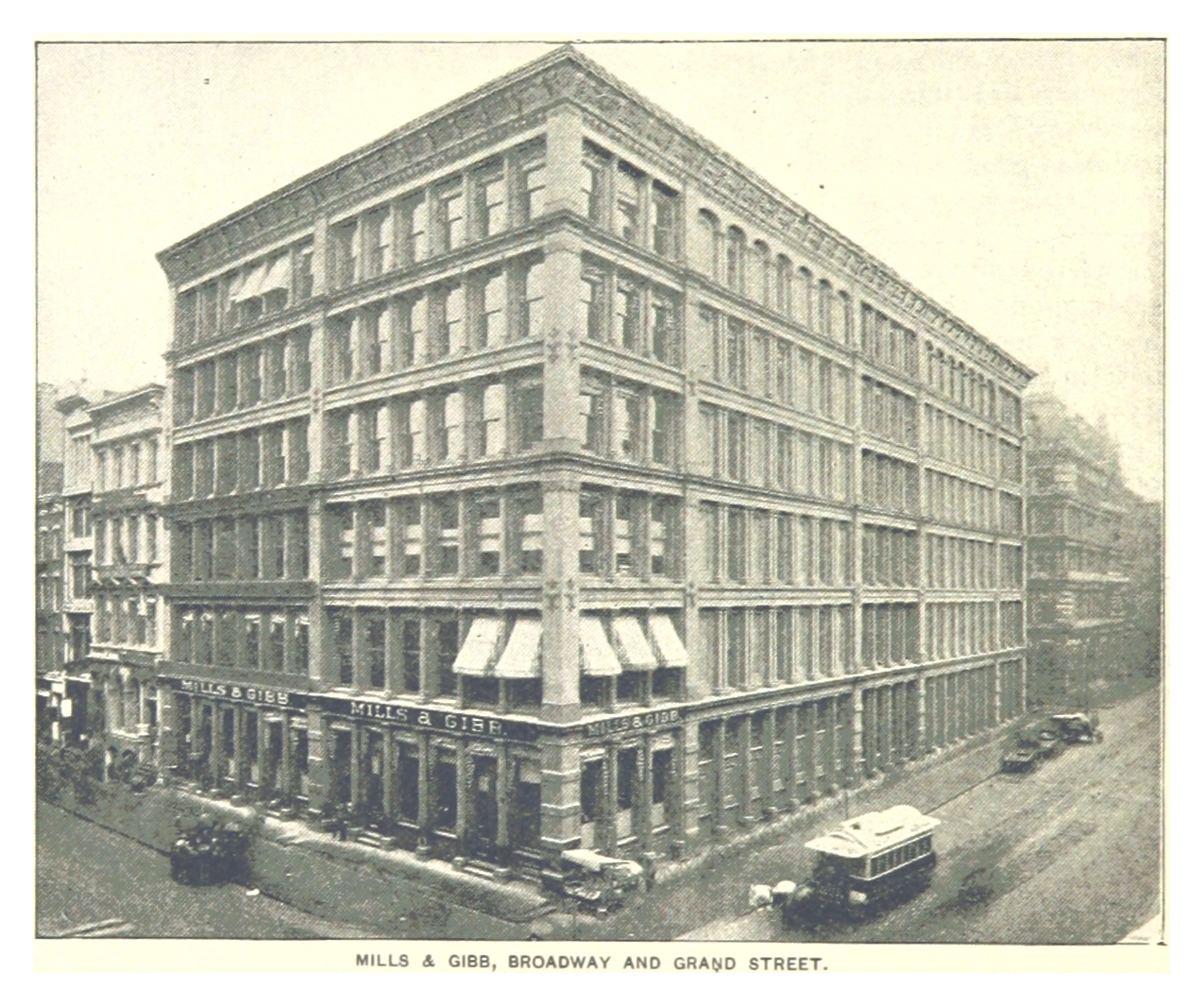
Mills & Gibb building, 462 Broadway (1893)

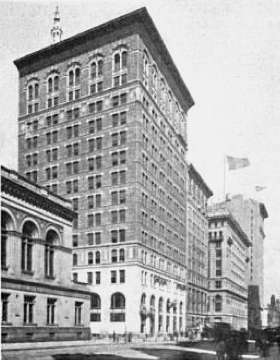
Mills & Gibb building, 4th Avenue & 22nd Street (now 300 Park Avenue South) (1910)

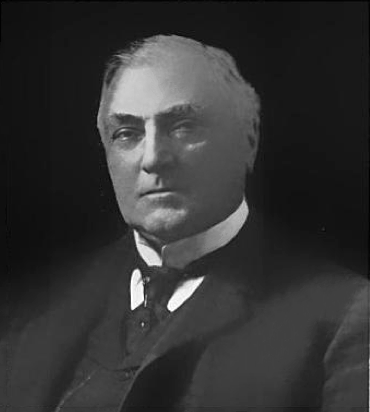
John Gibb (1829-1905)

Mills & Gibb was a U.S. importing and jobbing firm in New York City, New York. It specialized in lace and linen, as well as dry goods. It was originally located at 44 White Street. In 1880, the business moved to the 462 Broadway building, on the northeast corner of Grand and Broadway. It then purchased a site at Fourth Avenue and 22nd Street where it erected in 1910 a 16-story building, now known as 300 Park Avenue South. It was established by Philo L. Mills and John Gibb in 1865. A few years later, William T. Evans was admitted, and in 1903 the firm was incorporated, with Gibb as president; Mills, vice-president; and Evans, as secretary and treasurer.
