= Ruddington Depot =

Ordinance & supply depot in Nottinghamshire, England

- near Ruddington

Site information
- Type: Storage and Distribution Centre
- Open to the public: No

Location
- Ruddington Depot within Nottinghamshire
- Coordinates: 52.89°N 1.14°W

Site history
- Built: 1942
- In use: 1942–1983

Ruddington Ordnance & Supply Depot was a Royal Ordnance Factory filling and storage facility, commissioned in 1940 and built during World War II by the United Kingdom Ministry of Defence (MoD). It was located to the south of Ruddington, Nottinghamshire, and took 18 months to build. In operation it consisted of over 200 buildings employing 4,000 workers at peak. It was decommissioned in 1945, became a storage area for ex-military vehicles which were then auctioned-off onsite, and was closed in 1985. Today the site is located in the Rushcliffe Country Park.

== Construction ==
As World War II erupted, the MoD surveyed and purchased land for the construction of a national Royal Ordnance Factory. Sites were chosen that were (for safety reasons) remote from dense populations, but easily accessible via mainline railways from a number of towns and cities to allow the large number of workers access. This latter provision also sought a location close to key railway junctions, allowing easy access inwards for raw materials as well as quick distribution of the final product to the key seaports.

Prior to 1940 the site was used as agricultural land, located on the Great Central Railway between the major East Midlands cities of Nottingham and Leicester. The proposed ROF at Ruddington was to be used as a filling factory for ammunition, employing up to 6,000 people. After purchase of the land in summer 1940, in December 1940 ground works contractors levelled off the land. At peak, the site employed 100,000 labourers during the construction phase. As well as over 200 buildings, for railway goods traffic access a branch line was built to Ruddington railway station, for workers a new railway station, Ruddington Factory Halt railway station, was also constructed.

== Operations ==
The site was built to produce twice as much ammunition as it eventually produced, with the initial site laid out to allow it to do so. However, eventually the unused second part of the site was developed as an armaments storage facility.

The first part of the site was laid out as a filling factory, known as ROF Ruddington; Filling Factory No 14. Both gunpowder and shells were brought in via the branch line rail connection, into two different sets of sidings. The components were only brought together in the filling halls, some 20 wooden buildings in the centre of the complex, each with their own blast wall. Completed shells were then moved out to a small storage facility, before either being distributed directly via the railway, or taken to the separately fenced and laid out storage area.

The storage area, operated as a completely separate facility by the MoD to the ROF filling factory, stored completed shells and munitions from both the filling factory, and some other ROF facilities. These were then distributed via the railway for onwards shipment, or via road top local British Army and Home Guard units.

The complete facility was almost completely self-sufficient, equipped with:

- Two underground reservoirs
- A heating plant
- A sewage plant
- Several generators
- A telephone exchange
- Two canteens
- A surgery
- A laundry
- A bakery
- A mortuary

As a strategic war asset, the whole site was under tight security, with both on-site security staff and the MoD Police providing round the clock protection.

== 1945-1985: auctions ==
After being decommissioned in 1945, the site was used by the MoD for auctioning-off redundant ex-military vehicles and equipment. Held every eight weeks, the auctions were publicly advertised in both local and national press. The site was finally closed in 1983 when operations moved to Bicester.

== Present: Rushcliffe Country Park ==
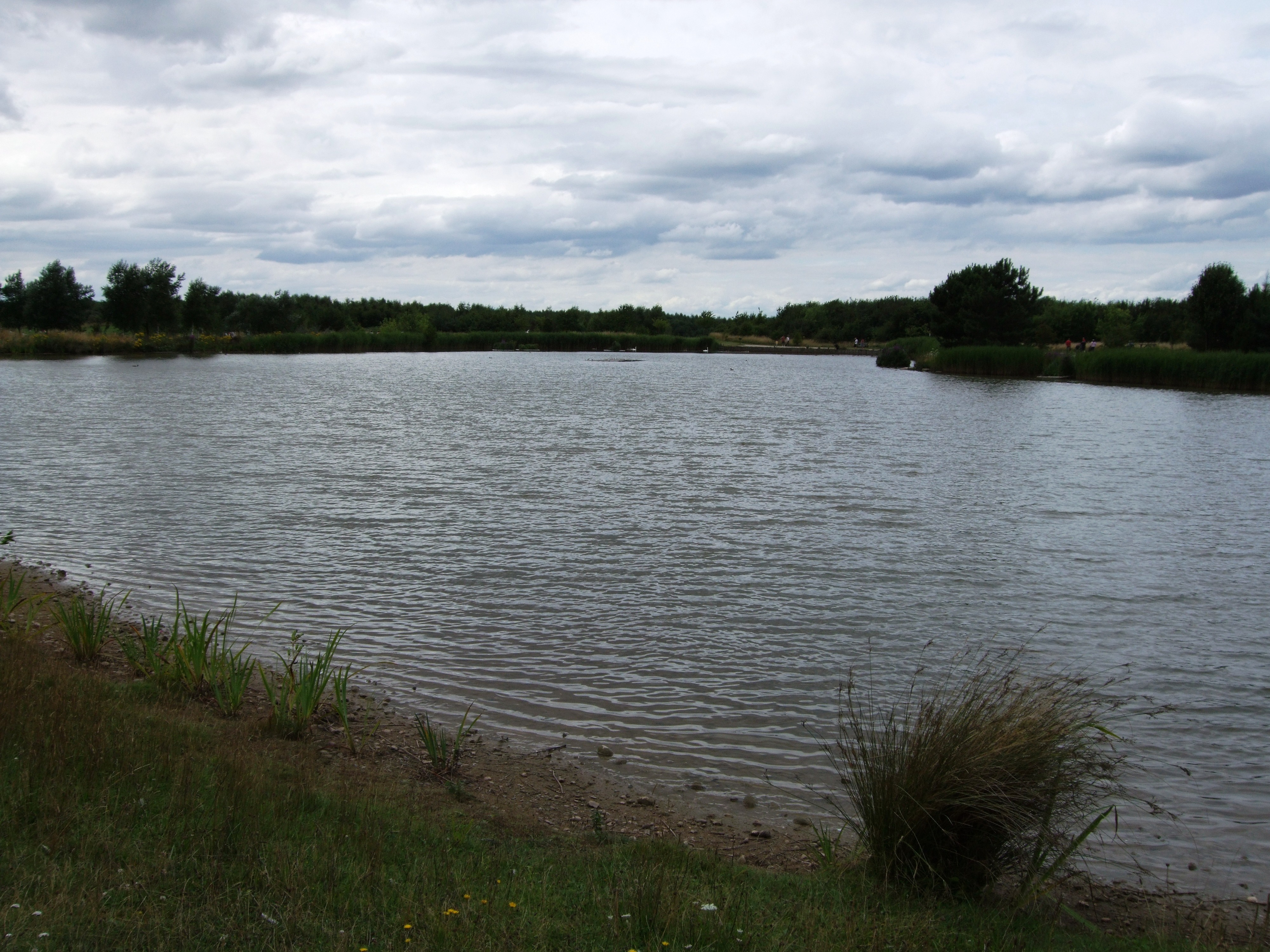
The lake at Rushcliffe Country Park

From 1985, the site was proposed for redevelopment. It had been scheduled for housing, after objections from the county council, the site was redeveloped into three sections:

- North: the residual railway infrastructure and sidings were redeveloped at the Nottingham Transport Heritage Centre
- East: redeveloped as a business park, the Ruddington Fields Business Park
- South: the majority of the site was redeveloped at a cost of £3.5 million as a recreational area, known as Rushcliffe Country Park, which covers 210 acres (0.85 km^{2}).
