= Richard Henson (cricketer) =

English cricketer

Personal information
- Full name: Richard Henson
- Born: 10 October 1864; Ruddington, Nottinghamshire, England
- Died: 29 November 1930 (aged 66); Ruddington, Nottinghamshire, England
- Batting: Unknown
- Bowling: Left-arm slow-medium

Career statistics
Competition	First-class
Matches	1
Runs scored	19
Batting average	9.50
100s/50s	–/–
Top score	17
Balls bowled	12
Wickets	2
Bowling average	2.50
5 wickets in innings	–
10 wickets in match	–
Best bowling	2/5
Catches/stumpings	–/–
- Source: Cricinfo, 28 July 2013

Richard Henson (10 October 1864 – 29 November 1930) was an English cricketer. Henson's batting style is unknown, though it is known he was a left-arm slow-medium bowler. He was born at Ruddington, Nottinghamshire and died there too.

Henson made a single first-class appearance for Liverpool and District against Cambridge University in 1894 at Aigburth Cricket Ground, Liverpool. In a match which Cambridge University won by nine wickets, Henson batted twice, making 2 runs in Liverpool and District's first-innings before he was dismissed by Charles Pope, while in their second-innings he was dismissed for 17 runs by John Robinson. He also took two wickets for five runs in Cambridge University's first-innings, taking the wickets of Pope and Horace Gray, who were the last two wickets to fall in the innings. Below first-class level he appeared in a single match for Shropshire County Cricket Club in 1905.
