= Rushcliffe Country Park =

Park space in Nottinghamshire, England

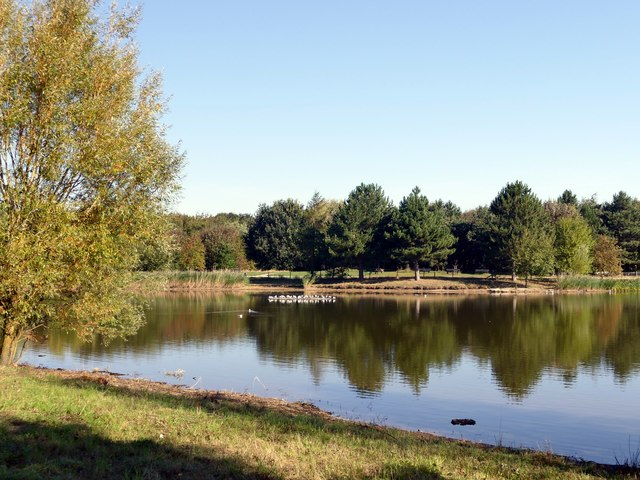
- Interactive map of Rushcliffe Country Park
- Type: Country Park
- Location: Ruddington, England
- Coordinates: 52.8925°N 1.1497°W
- Area: 210 acres (0.85 km^{2})
- Created: 1993
- Operator: Rushcliffe Borough Council
- Visitors: 250,000
- Status: Open All Year

Location of Rushcliffe Country Park

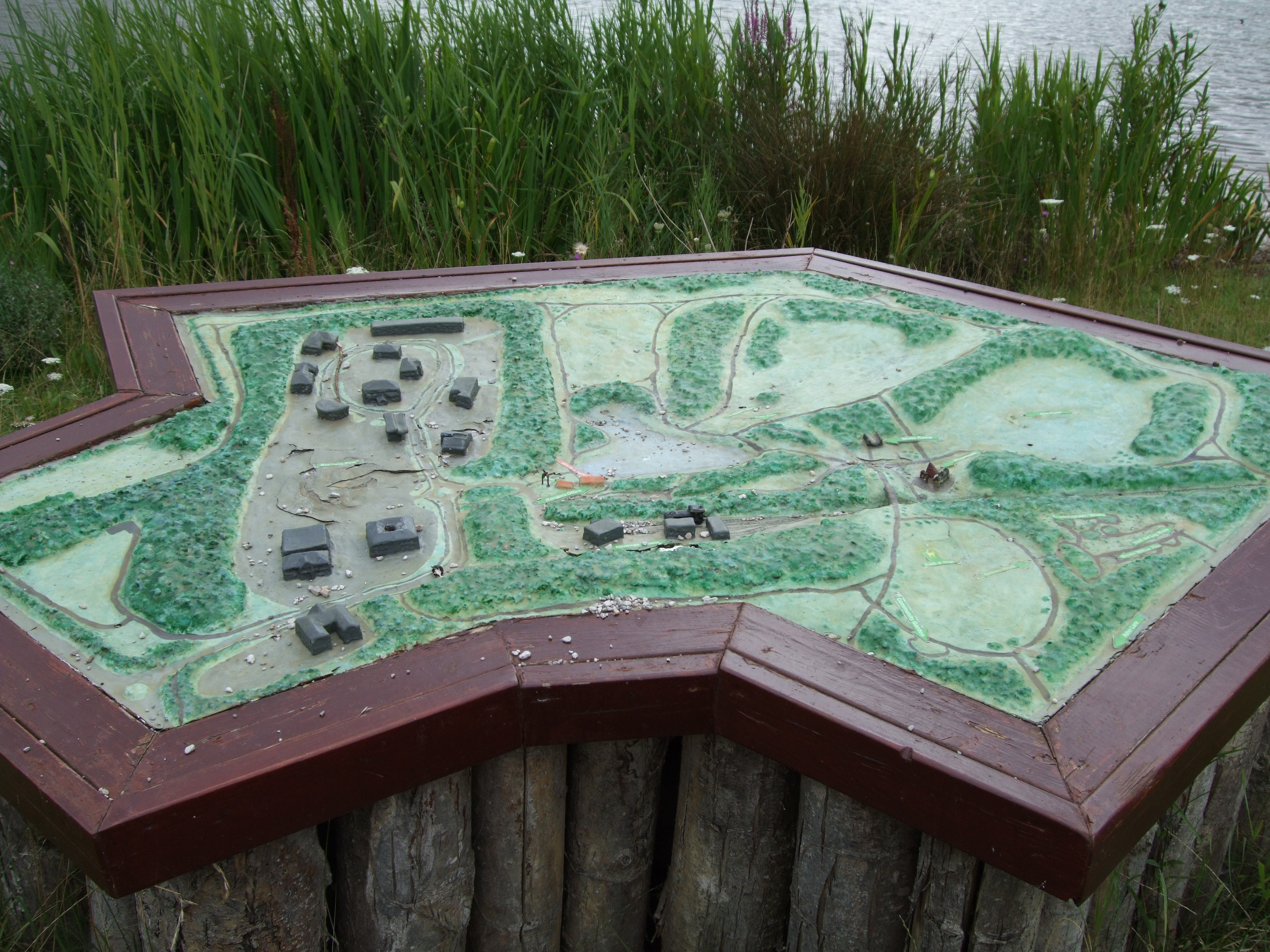
Model of Rushcliffe Country Park

Rushcliffe Country Park (Grid Reference SK577320) is an open park space covering approximately 210 acres (0.85 km^{2}), located on Mere Way just south of Ruddington in the borough of Rushcliffe, Nottinghamshire, England. The park has maintained the Green Flag award for twelve years; the National Standard for parks and green spaces in England and Wales.

== History ==
Originally the area was a boggy waterland. In the 18th century it was drained into a stream named Gibsons Dyke and transformed into productive farmland by Arthur Gibson after the Ruddington Inclosure Act 1767 (7 Geo. 3. c. 34 Pr.).

In 1940 Ruddington Depot was built with a bomb factory and ammunition bunker. The site consisted of over 200 buildings and took 18 months to build. A total of 4,000 workers were involved in the building work of a site that would remain for 41 years. A railway station Ruddington Factory Halt railway station was also constructed.

After being decommissioned in 1945 the site was used for auctioning redundant ex-military vehicles and equipment, with the depot finally closing in 1983. The auctions were known nationally and were held every eight weeks; each auction lasted for about a week and their popularity caused them to be advertised in the national press, which attracted dealers from all over the country.

The park is now situated on the site of the disused Ministry of Defence depot. The buildings were reduced to rubble when the park was reclaimed and designed by Nottinghamshire County Council. The rubble was used to landscape the site, almost 140,000 trees were planted and a 70,000 m^{3} lake created. Some areas, including Fowemer Hill were raised by 7 metres.

Work began in 1989 and the park was finally completed in 1993 at a cost of £3.5 million.

Originally, the site was meant to be used for housing, but the district council opposed the idea. It was then suggested that the site be used as a business park with landscaped surroundings. The Transport Heritage Centre was added as another idea to add greater interest to the site.

In 1999 a part of the play area was destroyed by an arson attack. The damage cost £14,000 to repair but is the only serious piece of willful damage to date.

It is now managed by Rushcliffe Borough Council with a team of full-time rangers and volunteers.

== Facilities ==
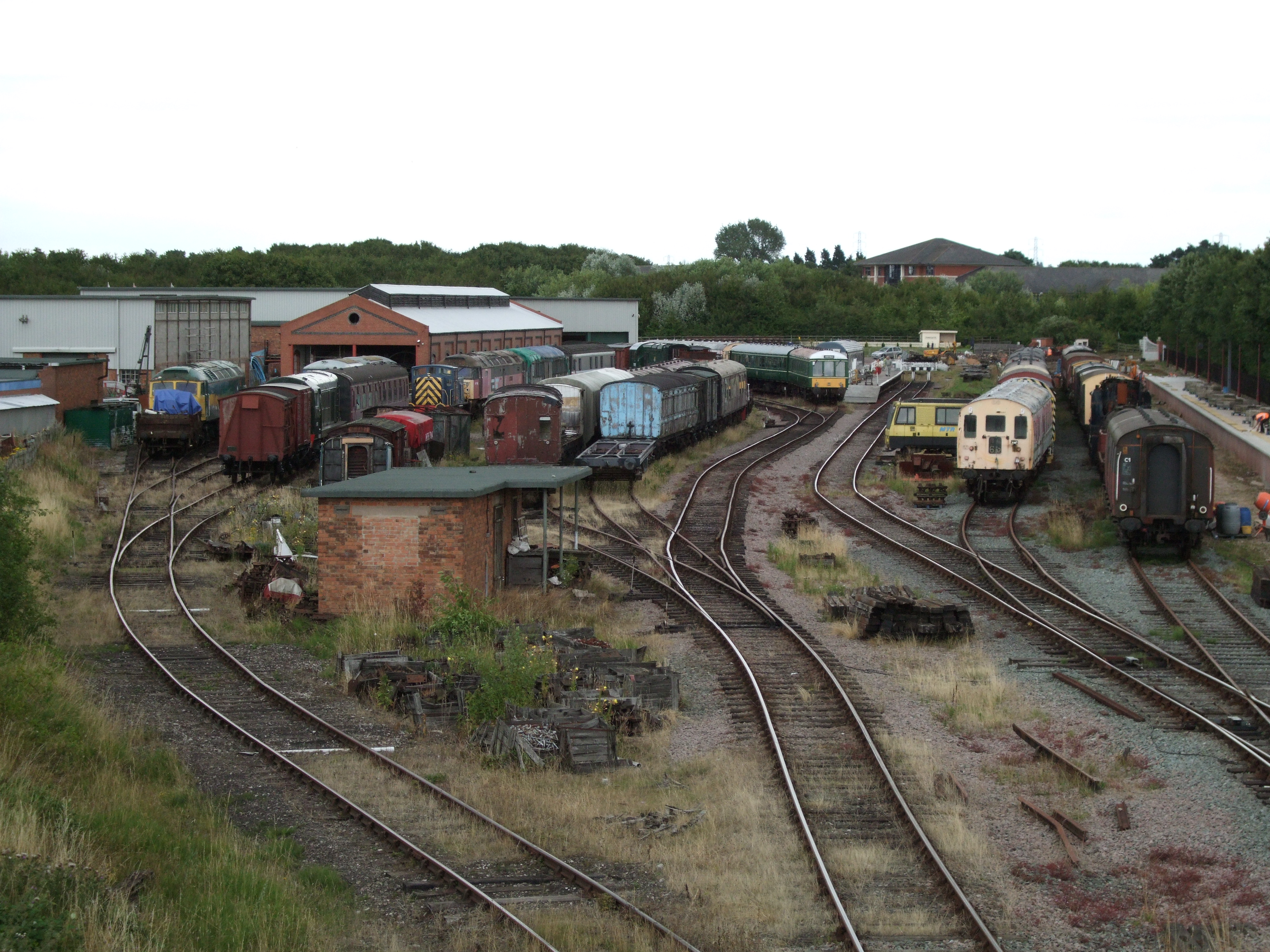
Nottingham Transport Heritage Centre

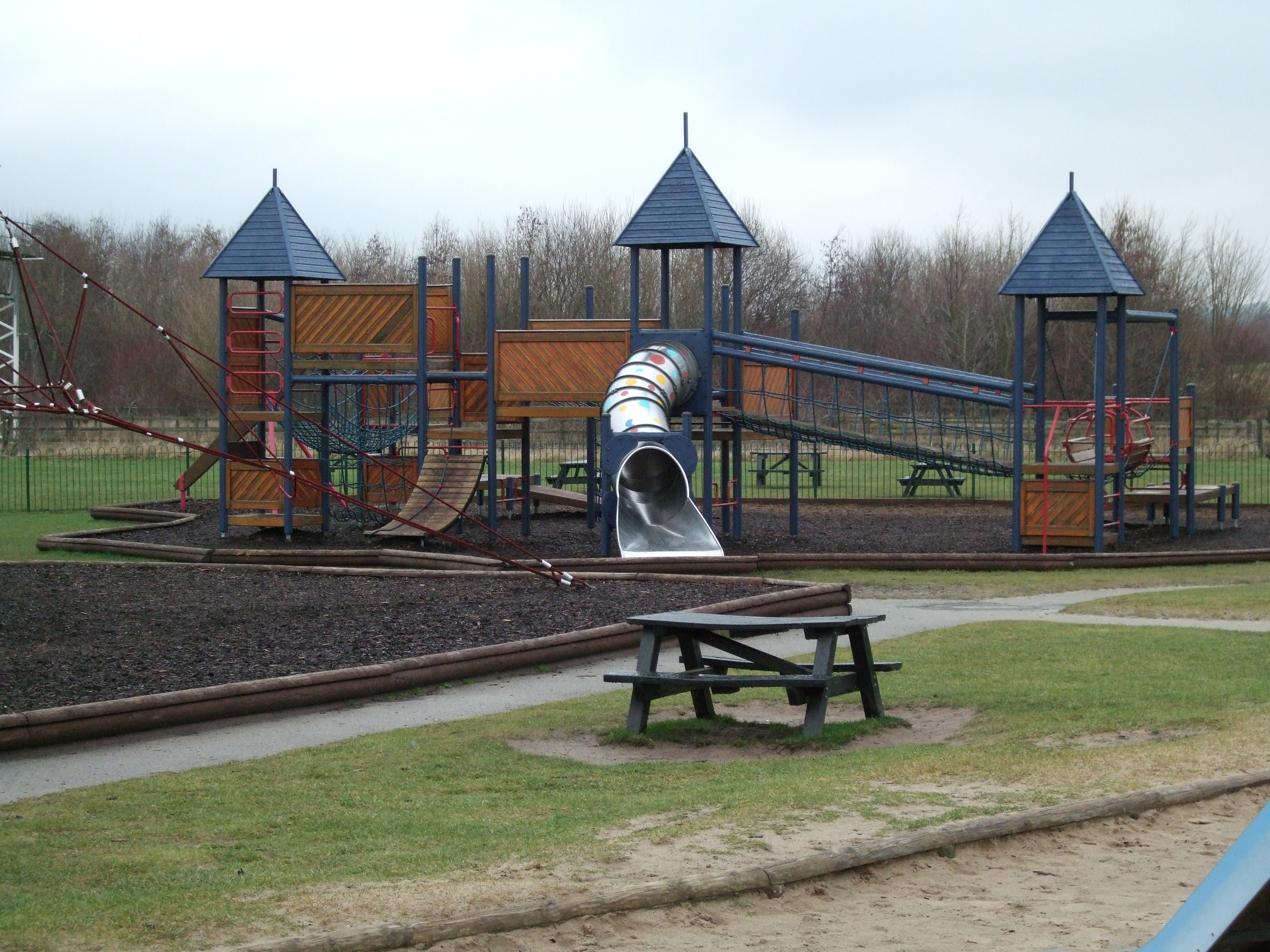
Play area

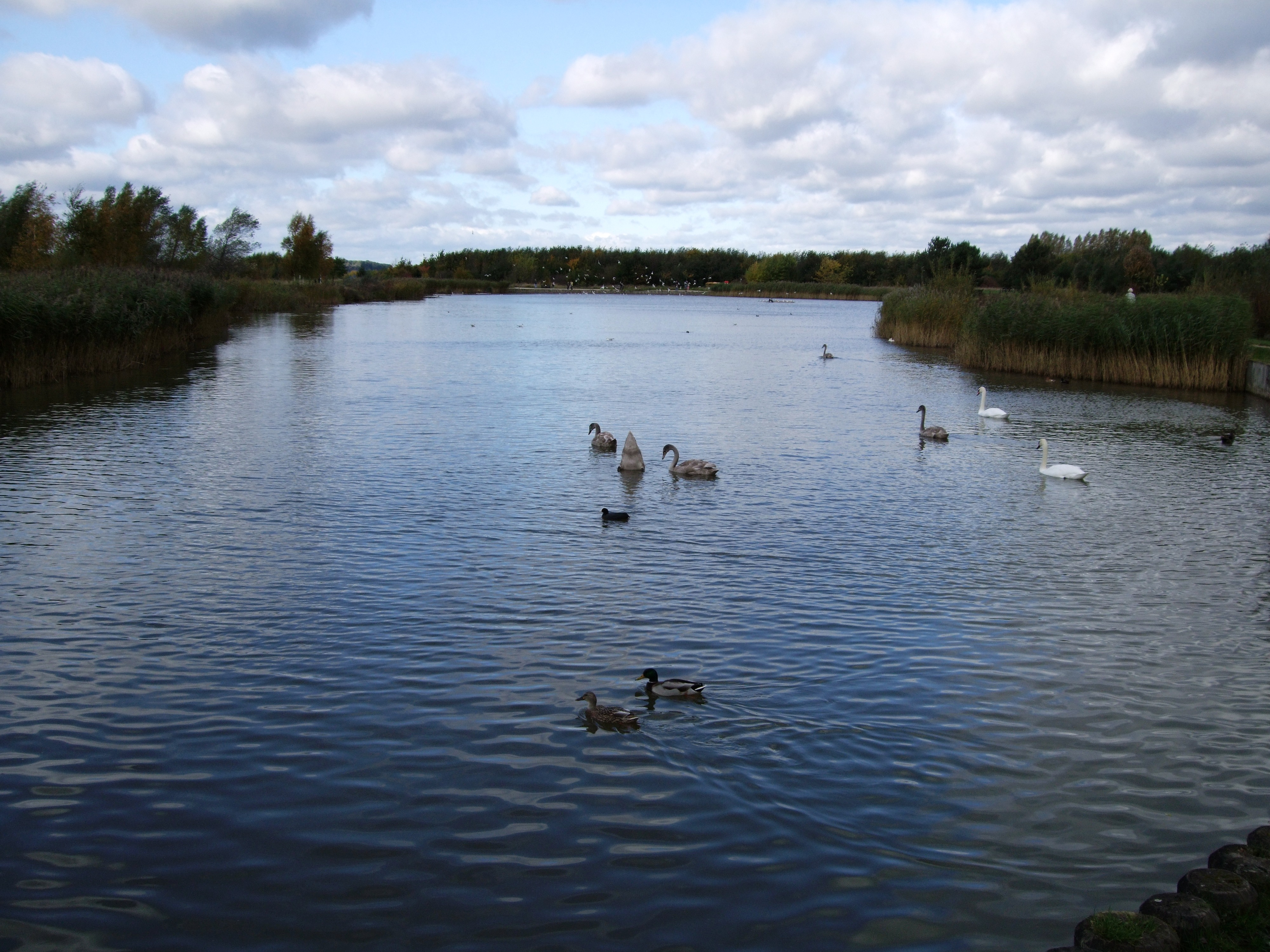
View of the lake

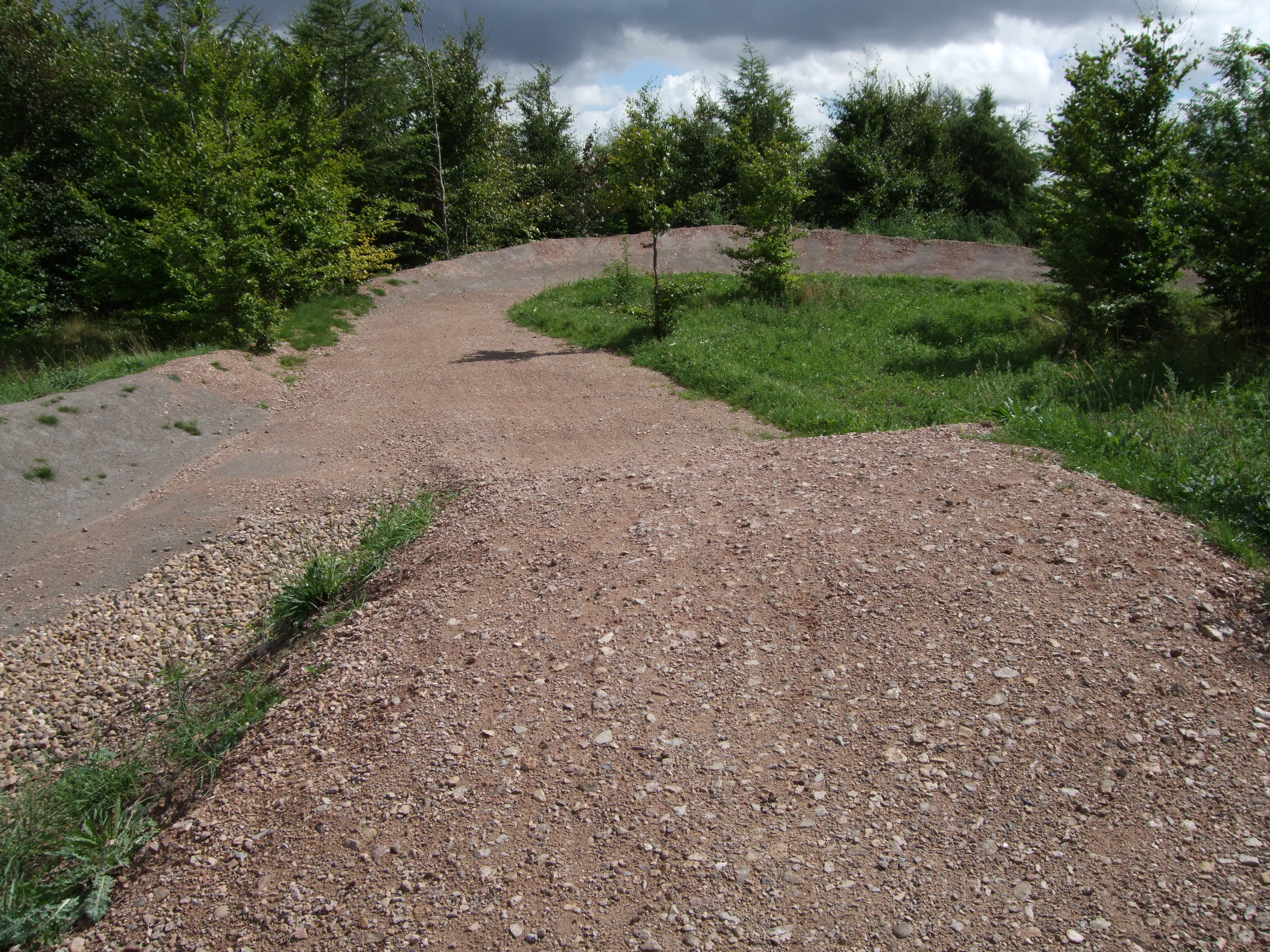
The bike track

The park is a natural habitat for wildlife, including a family of swans who first took up residence in May 1996 and is also used as an open space for recreational activities. It is open 365 days of the year although the car park has opening times dependent on the time of year. The car park was improved in early 2009 to improve safety and again in 2018 to create an additional 20 spaces.

There are over 5 miles (8 km) of pathways situated between landscaped areas, grassland, wildflower meadows, community gardens and woodlands which are used by walkers, joggers and cyclists.

The park is also located next to Ruddington Fields Business Park and the Nottingham Transport Heritage Centre which is open every Sunday and Bank Holiday from Easter Sunday to late October, with its collection of steam trains and classic buses.

=== Recreation ===
There are numerous recreational activities within the park including three Natural Heritage Trails of varying length which are followed by markers:

- Yellow Trail – 2.5 miles (4.0 km)
- Red Trail – 1.3 miles (2.1 km)
- Blue Trail – 1.2 miles (1.9 km)

A play area for children was built in 1996 at a cost of £180,000 and now has over twenty pieces of play equipment including two items of play equipment designed for disabled visitors, specifically a swing and roundabout which have been designed in conjunction with carers and professionals and include full body support and removable harnesses.

The whole play area underwent a £60,000 refurbishment in spring 2008 which added extra equipment for children whatever their needs.

A skateboard ramp was built in 2000 due to the enthusiasm of local teenagers who raised funds for its construction. There is a small refreshment stand close by, along with public toilets.

There is a man-made lake fed from a culvert (Gibsons Dyke) with reed beds covering two hectares, which serve as an important habitat for many species of birds and insect life. The park is an ideal place to spot wildlife in a natural habitat.

The park hosts several annual events, including a kite festival (which also boasts vintage fairground rides, farmers market and craft fair) and an annual 10k charity race including a 2k fun run. In March 2009, the nominated 10k charity race was in aid of Cerebral Palsy Sport.

In spring 2008 work began on a 4-cross cycle track which opened in May The track has been designed by Council engineers and members of the Free Riders 4-cross club and was partly funded by a £20,000 grant. A series of obstacles have been developed on a hillside including table tops, ski jumps, drop offs and double / triple jumps which will be to competition standards. It is intended that the track will be used for competitions, race meetings, daytime and evening school sessions as well as for public use. It will be one of only eight tracks based in the United Kingdom.

== Environment ==
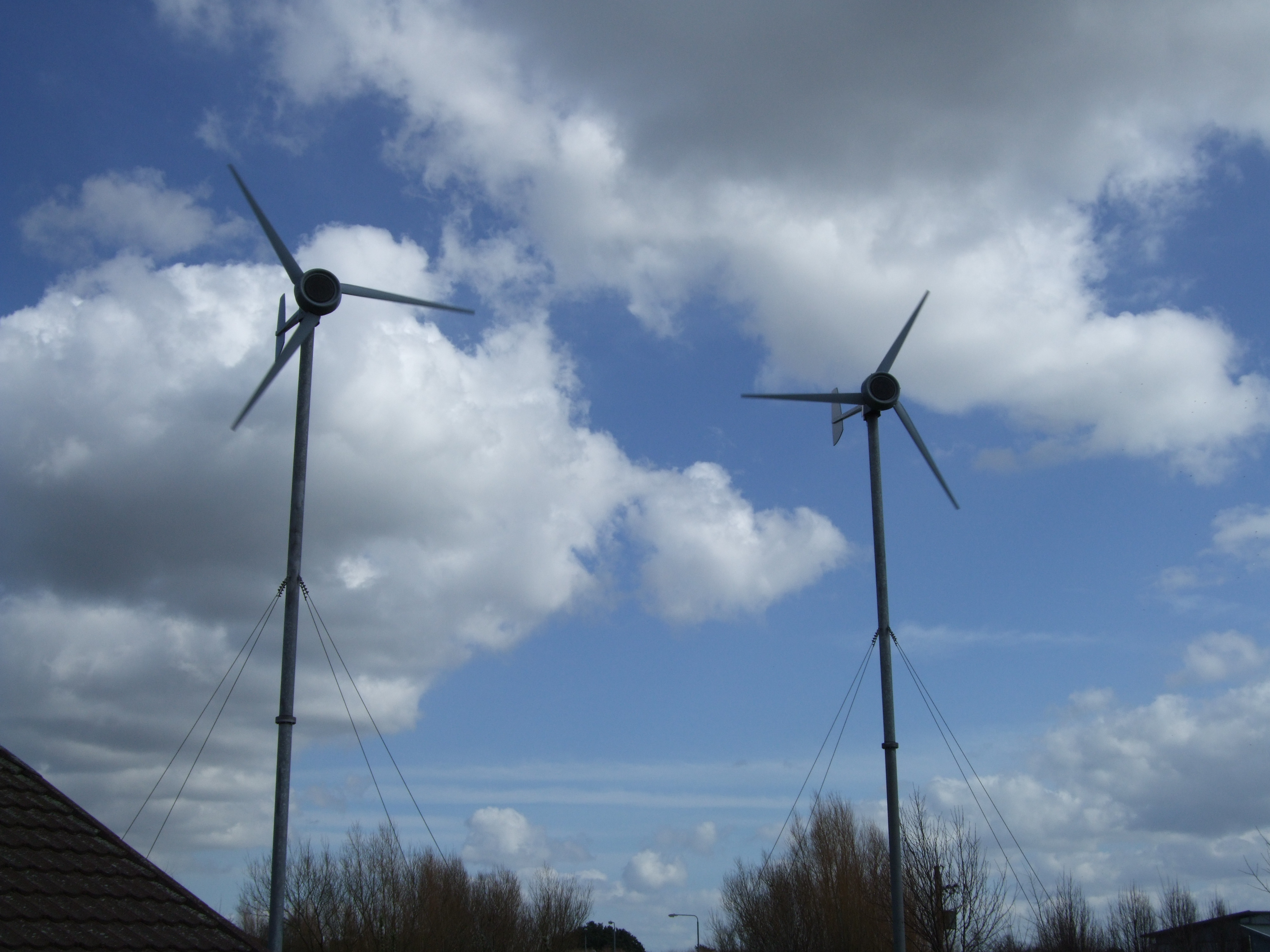
Wind turbines at the Environmental Education Centre

=== Energy ===
An Environmental Education Centre was officially opened in 2005 and is designed to be energy neutral. The project was financed by Nottinghamshire County Council

Two Iskra AT5-1 wind turbines were installed in February 2005 which generate power with the excess sold to the National Grid whilst Solar Power is used for water heating along with a Biomass Boiler. Composting toilets have also been installed.

Rushcliffe Country Park has received awards for its effective energy management.

=== Conservation ===
Gibbies Wood is an area of the park covering 4.5 hectares named after Arthur Gibson, which is part of the Natural Heritage Project and also a BTCV award-winning project. The area appeared to be returning to a marshland and therefore simple, modern drains were laid to discharge water from the site. This in turn created a shallow pond and helped re-establish a part of the marsh.

The park is home to a number of types of trees including: English oak, Red oak, Whitebeam, Rowan, Scots pine, Cherry, Yew, Field maple, Lime, Ash, Copper beech, Maple, Silver birch, Alder, Larch

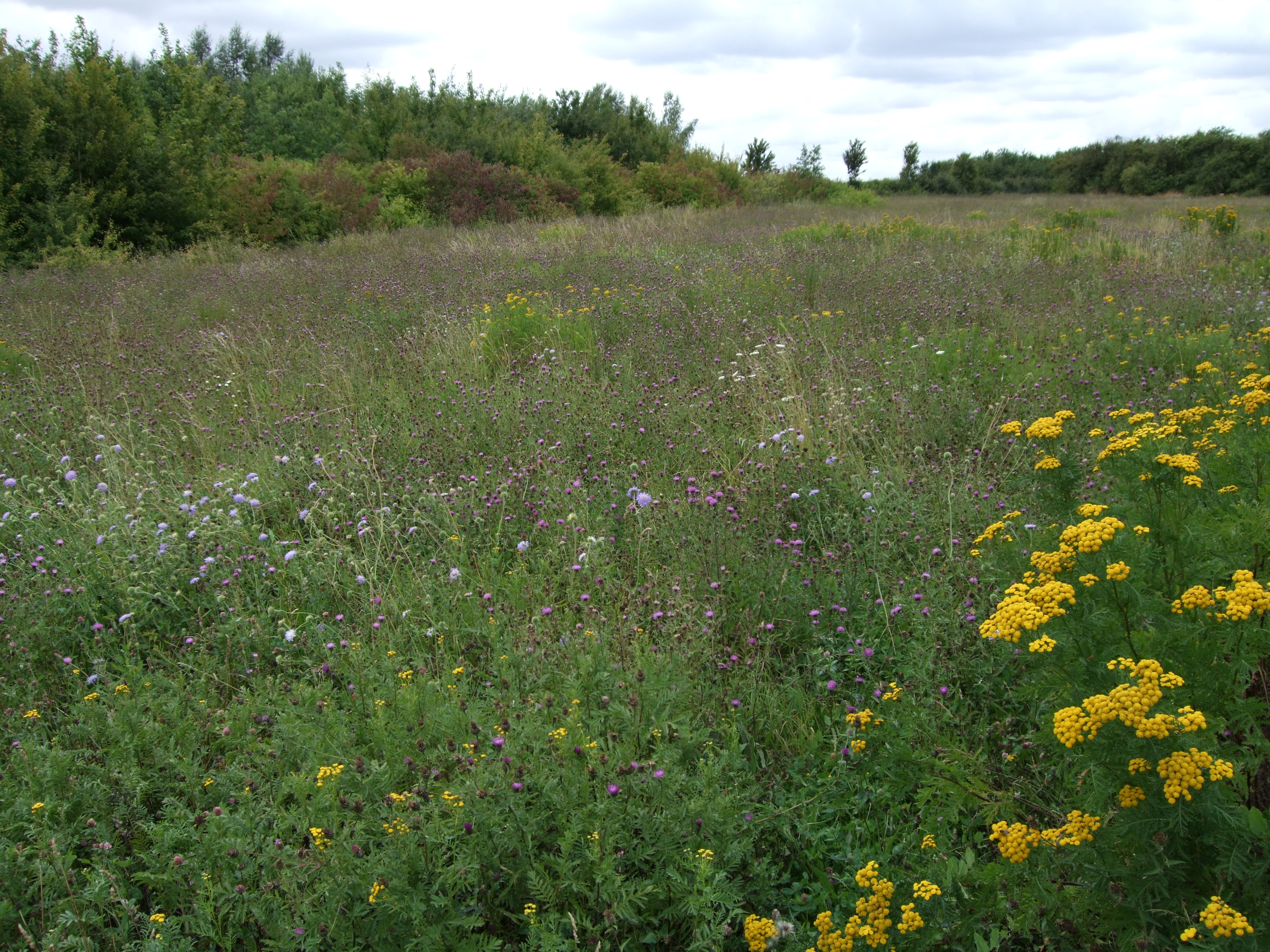
Wildflower Meadows

The Wildflower Meadows host over 100 species of flowers and 20 types of grass. From May through to September a succession of flowers attract bees, butterflies and many other insects. Small mammals also live within the meadows which creates a hunting ground for the birds of prey.

To date, 262 species of moth, 23 species of butterfly and 130 species of birds have been recorded.

There are a number of barn owl boxes throughout the park that attract little owls and kestrels.

The 1082 plus species of flora and fauna give the park SINC Status (Site of Importance for Nature Conservation) and Natural England have confirmed the park has Nature Reserve Status.

=== Friends of Rushcliffe Country Park ===
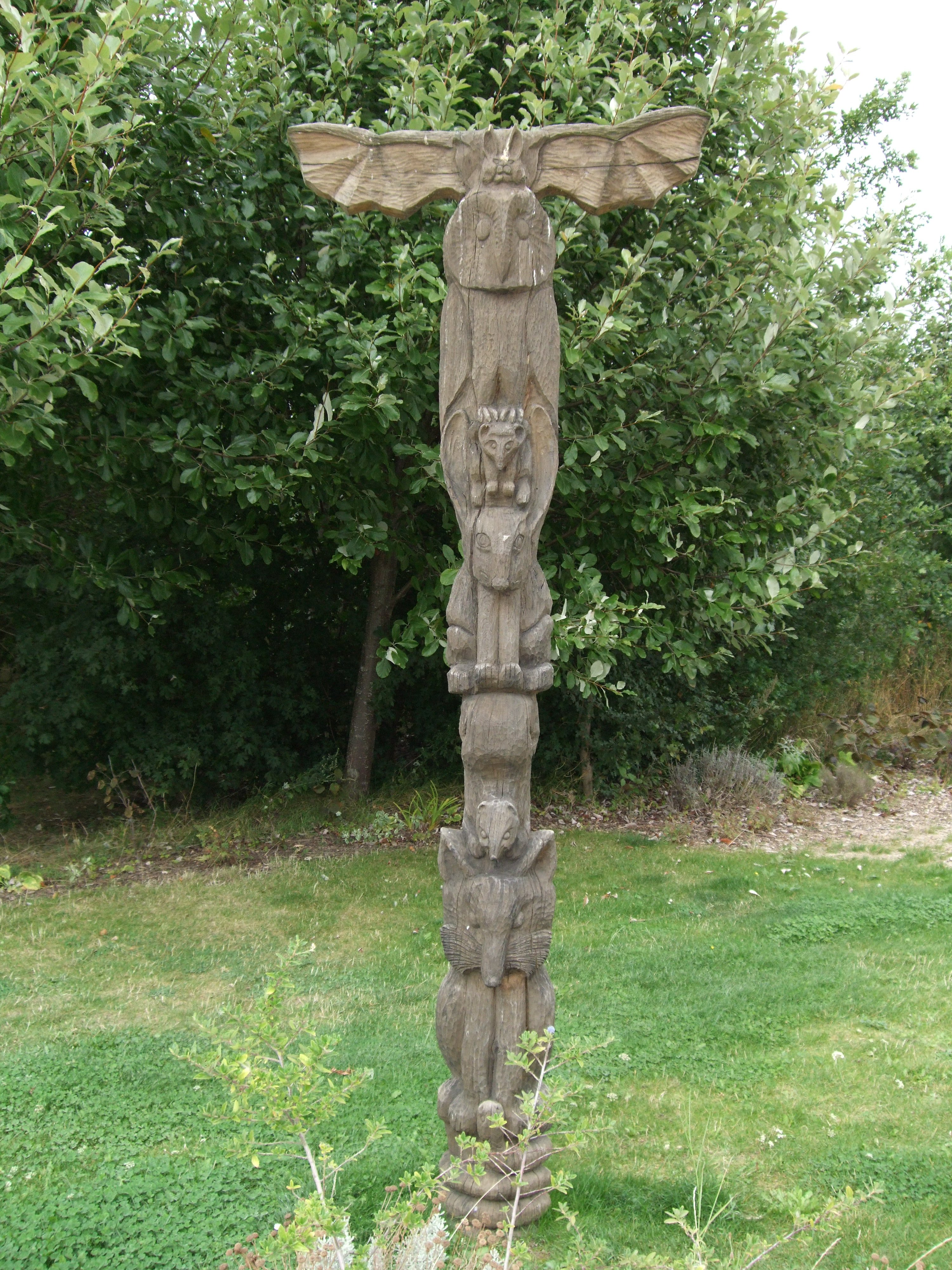
Totem pole

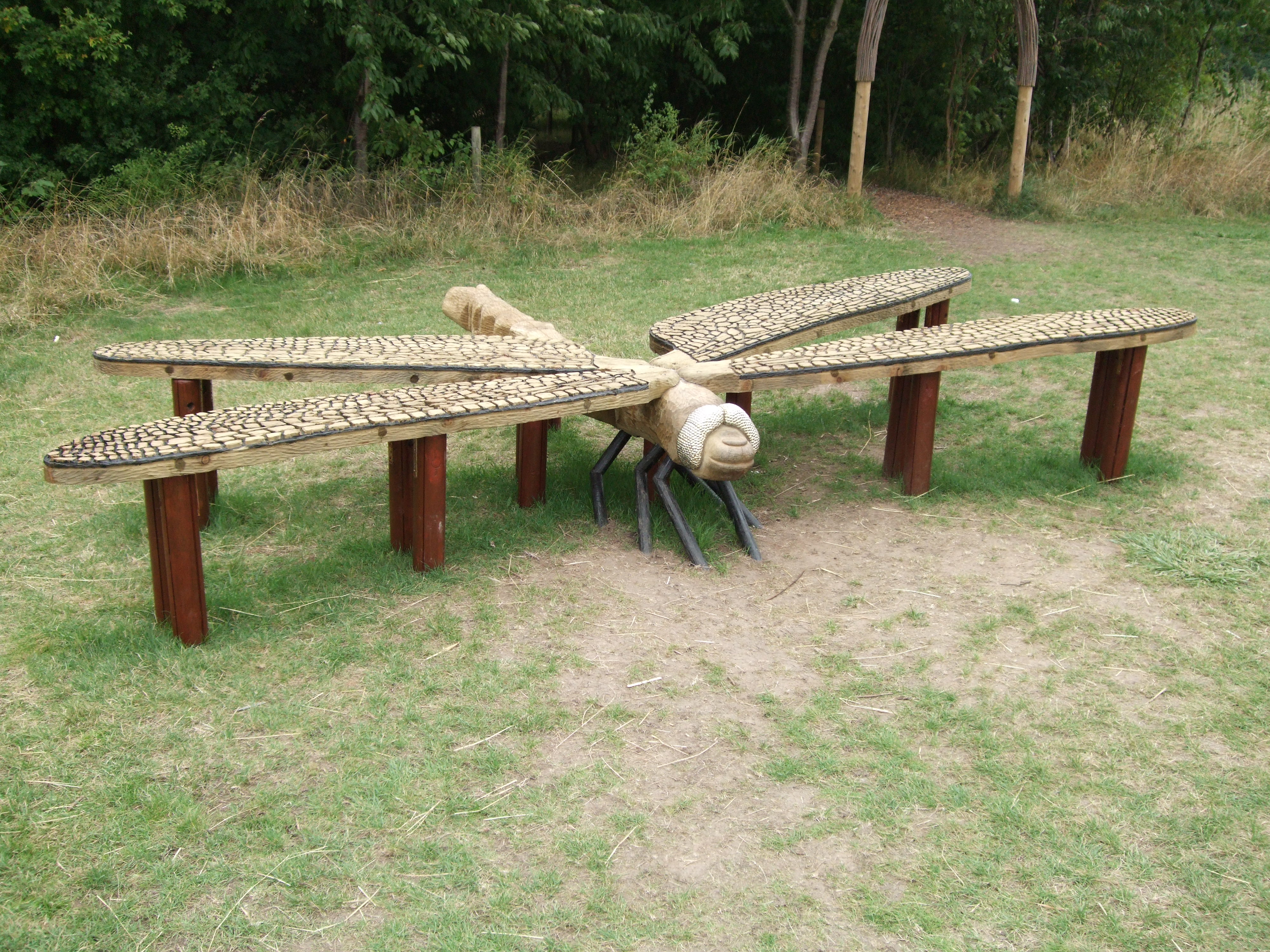
Dragonfly sculpture

The Friends of Rushcliffe Country Park is a voluntary group formed in October 1997 and a registered charity which meets regularly and carries out improvement projects and conservation work.

Recent projects have included the creation of a Garden of Friendship, willow sculptures, a tree identification trail, a sensory walk, and the carving of seats and other features, as well as conservation work such as hedge laying. The Friends of Rushcliffe Park also submitted a bid for lottery funding to provide fitness equipment for adults. This bid was ultimately unsuccessful but the project went ahead anyway. The adult fitness trail is located near the children's park area.

== Education ==
Rangers provide educational talks to local groups on environmental topics and there are also exhibitions explaining how to live a greener lifestyle.

For children there is a tree identification trail, pond dipping, sensory trail, orienteering, adventure orienteering trail and a habitat walk (the ranger-led activities are dependent on the weather and staff availability).

== Controversy ==
=== Naming and byelaws ===
In August 1993 the park was officially handed over to Rushcliffe Borough Council by Nottinghamshire County Council. In fierce controversy the park was named 'Rushcliffe Country Park' whilst it had been known locally as 'Ruddington Country Park'. Many local residents still do not recognise the park by its official name, preferring to use its previous title.

=== Tree felling ===
In March 2008 a petition was started to prevent the felling of several poplar and sycamore trees along the edge of the A60. It was concluded that twelve poplar trees could pose a danger to traffic as they were stressed and the sycamore trees had taken over the available space restricting the growth of other trees and had killed a hedgerow due to their close proximity blocking light. The petition gained approximately 350 signatures and was handed to Rushcliffe Borough Council.

The local council consulted with the Forestry Commission and maintained that once the trees were removed a new hedgerow would be planted which will add to the diversity of wildlife within the park and work begun felling the poplar trees in June 2008. In October 2008 the sycamore trees were felled and at the same time the hedgerow was re-planted with blackthorn, hawthorn and other native plants. The final trees were felled in early 2009 and 500 new trees were planted. The council intends to thin out the newly planted trees accordingly to create a new woodland area.

== Events ==
A Parkrun takes place every Saturday morning at 9 am.
