= 462 Broadway =

Commercial building in Manhattan, New York

Coordinates: 40°43′15″N 74°0′3″W

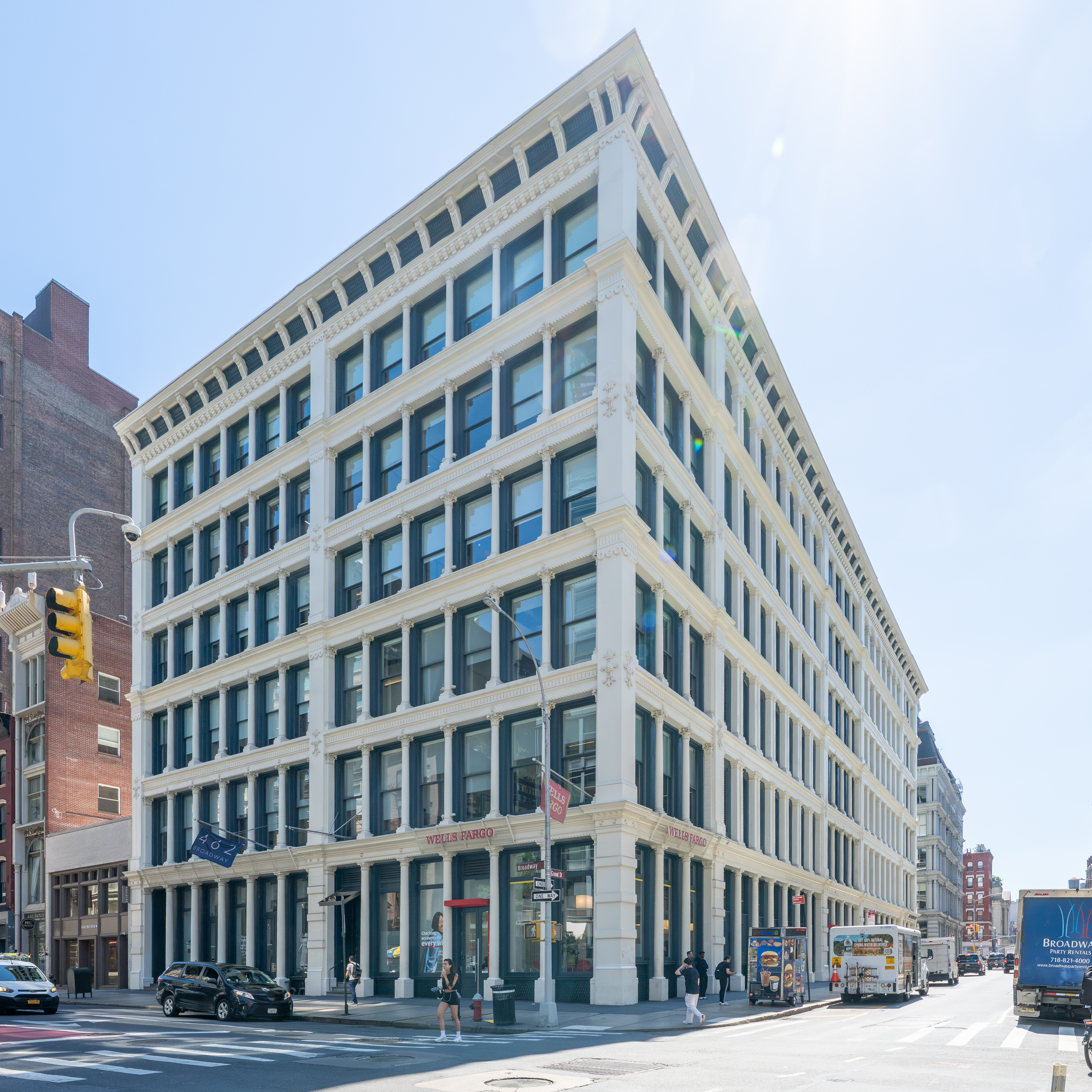
462 Broadway

462 Broadway (also known as the Mills & Gibb Building, 120-132 Grand Street and 30 Crosby Street) is a commercial building on Broadway between Crosby and Grand Streets in the SoHo neighborhood of Lower Manhattan, New York City Featuring polished red granite on the ground floor, it was built of cast iron in the French Renaissance style in 1879–1880 to a design by John Correja.

== History ==
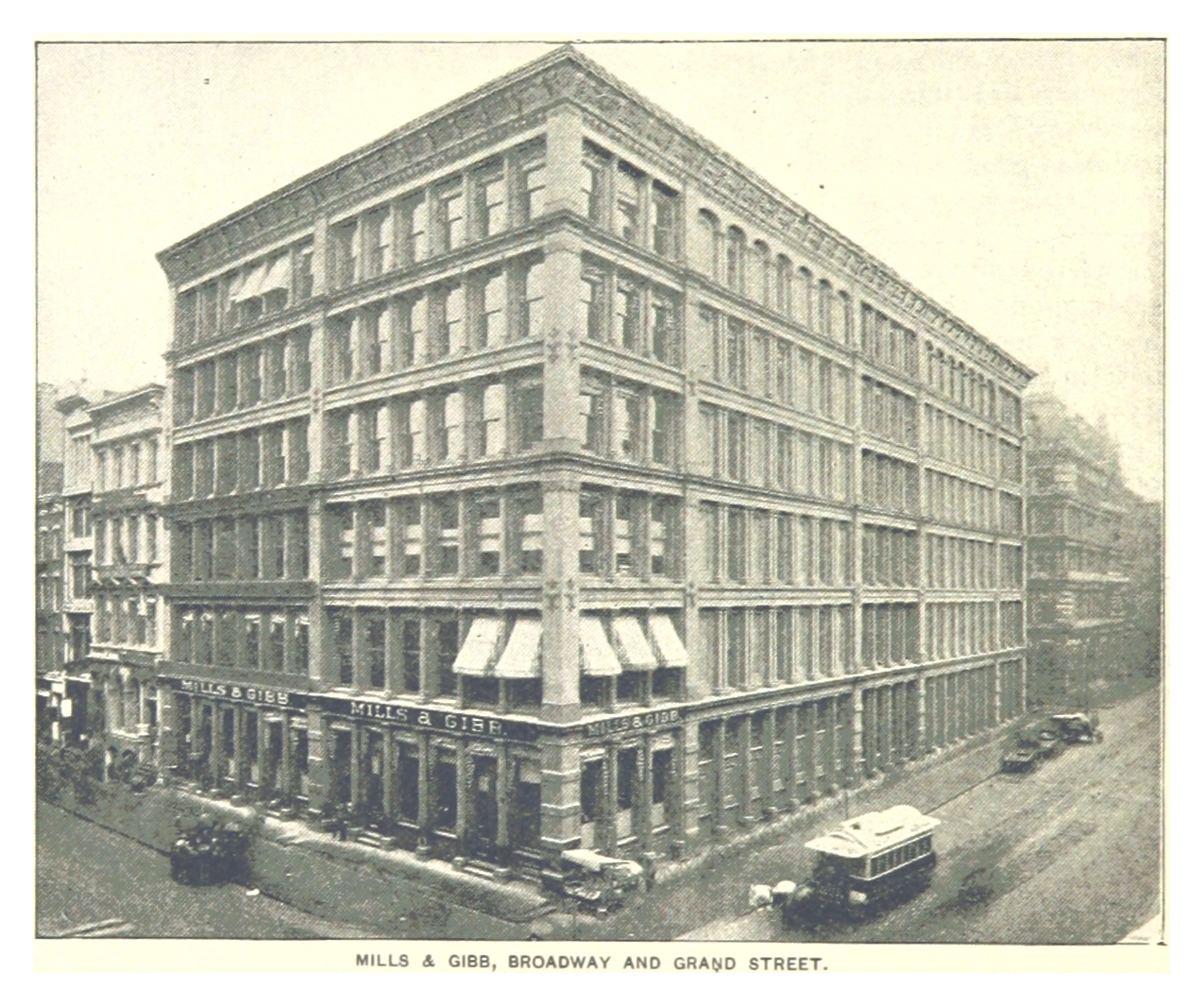
462 Broadway (1893)

An elegant residence was erected in 1828, which was afterward called the Broadway House, and known for many years as the Whig Headquarters. The site was later occupied by the Brooks Brothers' cast-iron building. After that building was demolished, the 462 Broadway building, also known as the Mills & Gibb building, was erected in 1879–1880 to a design by Correja.
