= MHR (company) =

HR and payroll software supplier

- Company type: Private
- Industry: HR, Payroll, Workforce Management, Finance
- Founded: 1984
- Founder: John Mills, Group Chairman and Founder.
- Headquarters: Ruddington, Nottinghamshire, UK
- Key people: Anton Roe, Chief Executive Officer.
- Products: iTrent, People First
- Services: Outsourcing and Consultancy
- Number of employees: 849
- Website: https://mhrglobal.com/uk/en

MHR is a provider of software and outsourcing services for HR, workforce management, payroll and finance. The company operates from its headquarters in Ruddington, Nottinghamshire, UK, and at one time reported that it supported the management, development and payment of just over 10% of the UK workforce.

== History ==
Established by President and Founder John Mills in 1984, the company was set up as Midland Software Limited - before changing its trading name to MidlandHR, and then to MHR in 2016 - to supply human resource and payroll software to clients on ICL VME and IBM 370 mainframes.

In 1992 the company moved to new headquarters, Ruddington Hall in Ruddington near Nottingham, and later acquired a second set of offices in the same area. The MHR Campus became the primary headquarters in 2024. As of July 2022, MHR employed more than 849 staff.

MHR then started and continued to develop software in-house. HR and payroll processing software, iTrent, was released in 2007, followed by People First in 2017.

In 2011, MHR acquired PBS UK; a company that offers HR and payroll services for small to medium-sized businesses.

In August 2021, MHR was ranked as one of the top 10 payroll services providers by Payroll Index. In September 2021, MHR were granted Royal Warrant for supply of HR and payroll systems.
