= Ruddington =

Village in Nottinghamshire, England

Coordinates: 52°53′32″N 1°09′00″W

- Village and Civil parish
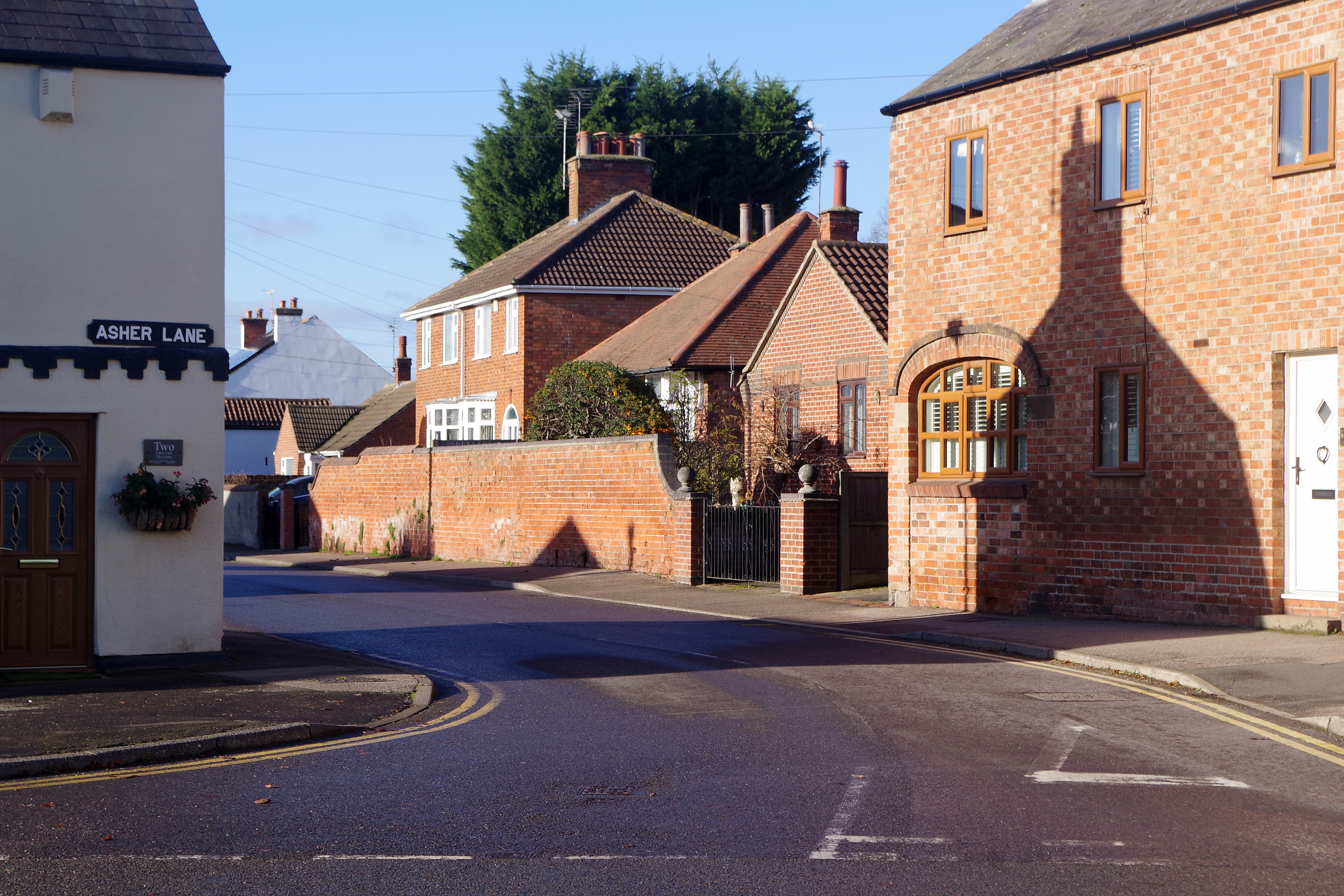
- Distillery Street

- Location within Nottinghamshire
- Interactive map of Ruddington
- Area: 4.45 sq mi (11.5 km^{2})
- Population: 7,674 (2021)
  - Density: 1,724/sq mi (666/km^{2})
- OS grid reference: SK 573330
- District: Rushcliffe
- Shire county: Nottinghamshire
- Region: East Midlands
- Country: England
- Sovereign state: United Kingdom
- Settlements: Ruddington: Ruddington Grange
- Post town: NOTTINGHAM
- Postcode district: NG11
- Dialling code: 0115
- Police: Nottinghamshire
- Fire: Nottinghamshire
- Ambulance: East Midlands
- UK Parliament: Rushcliffe
- Website: ruddingtonparishcouncil.gov.uk

Ruddington (/ˈrʌdɪŋtən/) is a large village in the borough of Rushcliffe in Nottinghamshire, England. The village is 5 miles (8 km) south of Nottingham and 11 miles (18 km) northwest of Loughborough. It had a population of 6,441 at the 2001 census, increasing to 7,216 at the 2011 census and 7,674 in 2021. Ruddington is twinned with Grenay, France.

The village residents have previously conducted high-profile campaigns in an attempt to retain the rural identity as a village and prevent it being subsumed into the adjoining suburban village of Clifton and town of West Bridgford. It maintains this through a variety of local amenities such as several shops, schools, public houses, community centre, village hall and churches within the village centre.

== Settlements ==
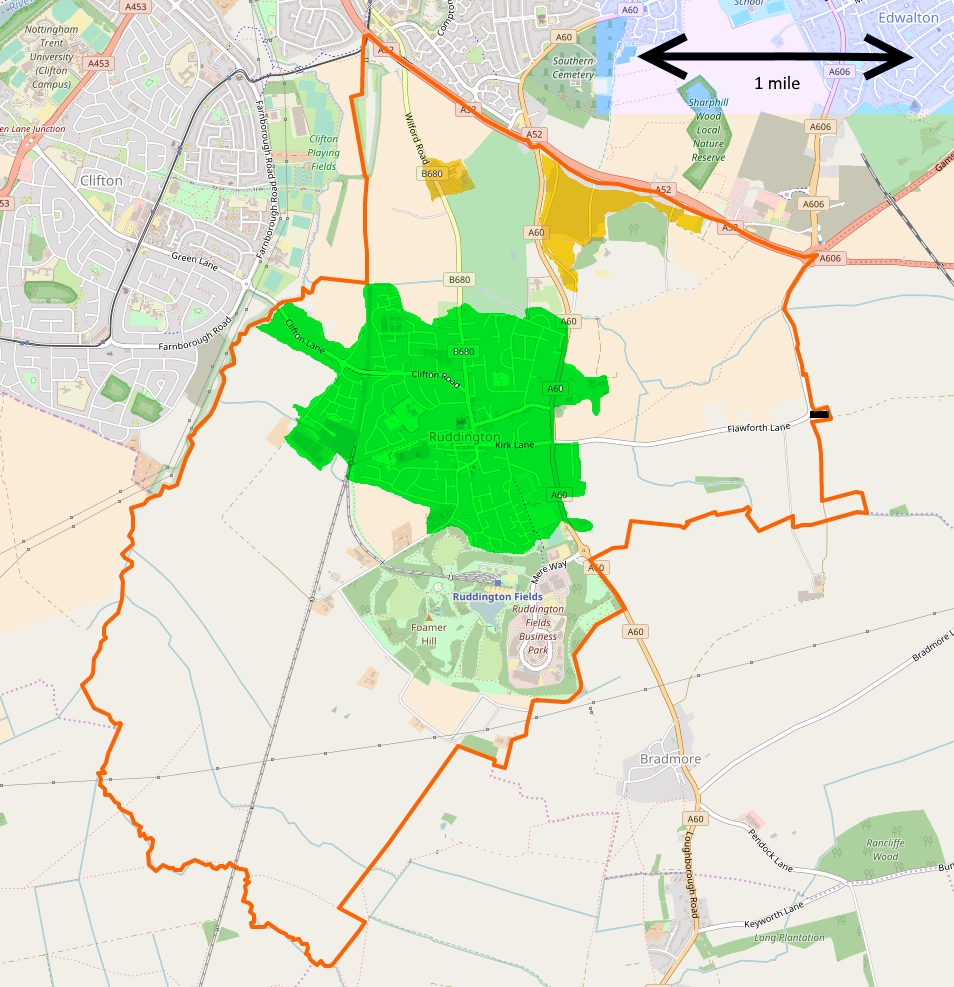
Map of Ruddington parish, showing boundary, the village area (green), Grange (two orange and light green areas) and Flawford (black rectangle to right shows church location). The business and country parks are to the south of the village

There are two urban areas, and a former village within the parish borders. These areas are considered to be within the regional Greater Nottingham conurbation due to their close proximity to the city.

=== Ruddington Village ===
The core built up area is about a mile in diameter. The B680 road from Wilford is the main thoroughfare in the village, and turns off to meet with the A60 on the outskirts. The key shops and facilities are located along the High Street, Church Street and Dutton's Hill roads. The Green is a small village green park area to the south of these. Other parks include the Elms Park football and cricket ground, St Mary's, Vicarage Lane Playing Field, and Sellors' Playing Field which hosts the annual village fair. There is a war memorial and garden within the St. Peter's Church grounds, and various museums (see Museums section below) hosting insights into the history and heritage of the village. Residential areas include the Elms Park estate, Manor Park, the newer Wheatley Fields estate, and Brook Hill which is a thin line of ribbon development almost contiguous with Clifton. The village conservation area of 20.5 hectares was first designated in 1970, and stretches from Manor Park, and through the historic centre to more recent buildings on the A60 Loughborough Road. There are also several Grade II listed buildings of note - St Peter's Church, period knitters workshops and cottages, as well as a phone kiosk feature amongst them.

=== Ruddington Grange ===
This is a mainly residential hamlet of around 200 residents which lies half-mile to the north of the village. It is split into two parts by the A60 road and the Grange manor house surrounding grounds, this having been redeveloped in 1988 into the present-day event venue and golf course. The wider Grange area is also home to Ruddington Hall, in use for many years as offices of an IT organisation, and nearby Mickleborough Hill.

=== Flawford ===
Also known as Flawforth, this has been reported as a 'lost village', once located where present-day Flawforth Lane changes direction at a right angle although ruins of a Roman villa, with its attendant outbuildings may have been mistakenly identified as a later settlement. The most notable feature was St. Peter's Church which eventually fell into disrepair and was pulled down in the late 18th century, the foundations currently marked out in the ground at the site. Along with the lane and a no through road (Flawforth Ave), the placename variations live on in the names of present-day nearby farms.

== Parish ==
The civil parish covers a wider area than the settlements, and is geographically characterised by much low-lying terrain used for farmland. The land is generally 30–40 m (98–131 ft) above sea level, extending from the flat Ruddington Moor area in the south, to the elevated Grange area which contains Mickleborough Hill, the highest point at 70 m (230 ft).

Administratively, Ruddington Parish Council manage the area as the first tier of local government, Rushcliffe Borough Council and Nottinghamshire County Council providing successively higher level services.

Rushcliffe Country Park, an area developed on the now decommissioned Ruddington Depot, along with the Ruddington Fields Business Park which hosts several national businesses, both lay to the south of the main village. Other industrial sectors include units in the north of the Manor Park area and the Artex head office on the southern edge of the Wheatley Fields housing development.

Fairham Brook forms the south and west boundaries of the parish, meeting the Nottingham city border before flowing under the Fairham Bridge which links Ruddington and Clifton. Its subsidiary stream Packman Dyke becomes the border for a short distance, before meeting the former Great Central Railway track alignment which becomes the boundary in the north western corner of the parish, Wilwell Farm Cutting Nature Reserve creates a brief deviation with a line of trees before the GCR route meets the existing NET tram route by the A52 trunk road. The north parish border runs alongside the A52 easterly before diverting at Lings Bar roundabout, mirroring Flawforth Lane to the historical St. Peter's church site before branching off south of Crockhill Wood, meeting and tracing the A60 road briefly, then following a private farm road to the south of the business park and along farm plots and reaching Fairham Brook at Ruddington Moor.

Bradmore, Bunny and East Leake lie to the south of the parish; Gotham to the south west; Barton-in-Fabis to the west; Clifton to the north west; Wilford, Wilford Hill and West Bridgford to the north; Edwalton to the north east; Tollerton and Plumtree to the east; and Keyworth to the south east.

== History ==
There is evidence of occupation in the area during the Bronze Age (c. 1500 BC). The toponym "Ruddington" comes from Old English and means "the estate of the people of Rudda".

In the Domesday Book in AD 1086, Ruddington's population entry recorded around 250 people. Most were involved in agriculture and this way of life changed little for many hundreds of years, the population marginally increasing by the 17th century to only approximately 320. Open field lands were reallocated amongst the inhabitants in 1767.

There are 1st century Roman remains of a large villa at Flawford. The first known St. Peter's church dates from the 9th century and was built over the foundations of the villa, this was a shared church also catering to the nearby villages of Edwalton, Plumtree and Keyworth. Alabaster church effigy pieces were found here in 1779 and are presently kept at the Nottingham Castle Museum.

St Mary's was first established in Ruddington village as a manor chapel in around 1292–94 attached to the adjacent manor house (now the Hermitage), the lord of the manor at the time overseeing the building. It was eventually renamed as St Peter's Church after the Flawford church, due to disrepair, was pulled down in 1773–79.

Ruddington's association with the knitting industry had begun by the start of the 19th century after the invention of the knitting frame in Nottinghamshire. The industry attracted new inhabitants and the population grew to 2,500 during this time as an associated extension to lace manufacture. New houses and frameshops, including the site occupied by the present-day Ruddington Framework Knitters Museum (see the Museums section below) were built to provide homes and workspace for the knitters and families. The 1851 census showed that half of the heads of households in the village were involved in the occupation. Framework knitting in the village declined towards the end of the 19th century as steam-powered machines developed and factories provided large-scale competition to the manual methods still being employed by the villagers.

Charles Paget, local Nottingham MP, in 1828 built the Ruddington Grange manor house, which established the hamlet of the same name.

White's Directory in 1853 records George Augustus Parkyns, as the principal owner, and lord of the manor of Ruddington.

Ruddington Hall was built in 1860, by Thomas Cross from Bolton who was a banker and justice of the peace, he owned it until his death in 1879. In 1880 an American merchant, Philo Laos Mills, purchased and resided at the hall. He was appointed High Sheriff of Nottinghamshire in 1897. It was a hospital during the Second World War until 1980, when it was bought and converted into offices, and is in use today as the head office for a local business.

The Village Hall was constructed between 1912 and 1913 to the designs of the architect William Herbert Higginbottom. The Misses Paget gave £800 of the £1,100 (equivalent to £108,600 in 2025) construction cost.

Sellors' Playing Field was gifted to the village via the parish council in 1947 by Frederick Sellors, the annual Wakes Funfair being held on the site since 1968.

Ruddington expanded further between the wars and after as new housing estates were built at the edge of the village. The Ordnance Supply and Disposal Depot opened at the start of World War II and occupied a large area on the southern outskirts of the village. The depot closed in the 1980s and the site was redeveloped in 1993 into Rushcliffe Country Park and Ruddington Fields Business Park.

=== Former secondary school ===
Ruddington County Secondary School was on Ashworth Avenue. It was to be built in West Bridgford, but protestors in Ruddington collected 3,000 signatures. Lutterell Secondary Modern School would open in September 1956, later becoming South Nottingham College.

The new school would also take people from Bradmore and Bunny, and would open in the summer term of 1958. It was built in eight months, with eight classrooms and a science laboratory. The headmaster was Thomas Henry Burdett DFC, with 310 children. He stayed until the end of the school. Mr Burdett originated from Worksop, and married in West Bridgford in December 1940. He was awarded the DFC in February 1944, and flew with 540 Squadron, flying reconnaissance aircraft. The school was officially opened on Saturday 8 November 1958, by Sir Edward Herbert.

It became a county junior school in 1972, St Peter's C of E Junior School, on the main Loughborough road.

== Railway station ==
Ruddington railway station was on the former Great Central Railway (later part of the London & North Eastern Railway), the last main line to be built from the north of England to London, opened on 15 March 1899. The station closed on 4 March 1963 but the line remained operational for passenger traffic until 5 May 1969 and for freight until 1974. The line was subsequently dismantled north of Ruddington, but the section south to Loughborough remains in existence as a heritage railway (see Nottingham Heritage Railway Museums entry below).

== Bus services ==
Bus services in Ruddington, Nottinghamshire
Bus operator	Line	Destination(s)	Notes
Nottingham City Transport	9	Nottingham → Railway Station → West Bridgeford → Compton Acres→ Ruddington → Clifton (Farnborough Road, Southchurch Drive, Crusader Island)	
Nottingham City Transport	10	Nottingham → Railway Station → Trent Bridge → Loughborough Road → Wilford Hill → Ruddington	
Nottingham City Transport	10C	Nottingham → Railway Station → Trent Bridge → Loughborough Road → Wilford Hill → Ruddington → Rushcliffe Country Park	
Nottingham City Transport	10X	Nottingham → Railway Station → Trent Bridge → Loughborough Road → Wilford Hill → Ruddington (Ruddington Business Park)	
Kinchbus	9	Nottingham → West Bridgford → Ruddington (Ruddington Business Park) → Bunny → Costock → Rempstone → Loughborough	

== Museums ==
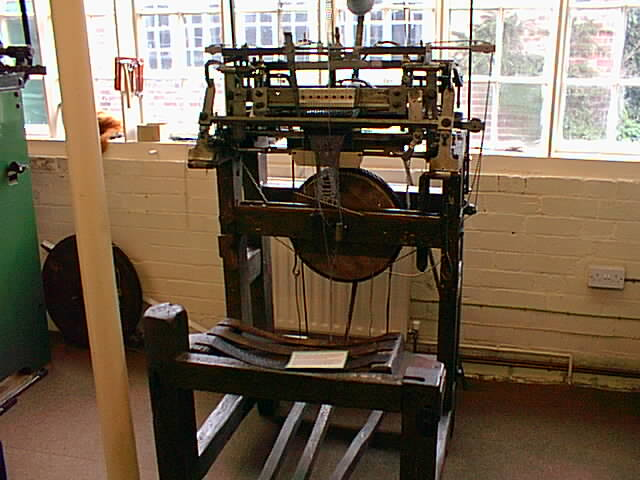
Stocking Frame at Ruddington Framework Knitters' Museum

Ruddington is notable for being the home of three museums.

The Ruddington Village Museum
features authentic Chemists, Ironmongers and Fish and Chip shops from the Edwardian era, all rebuilt part by part inside the building, which was previously the Ruddington Infant and Girls' School.

The Ruddington Framework Knitters' Museum
is a unique complex of listed frameshops, cottages, and outbuildings arranged around a garden courtyard, together with a former chapel. The site has been restored to show the working and living conditions of the framework knitters who occupied it throughout the nineteenth century, and is one of the few places in Britain where you can see a working Framework Knitting machine.

Nottingham Heritage Railway
is next to Rushcliffe Country Park. There is a preserved stretch of the former Great Central Railway line which currently runs to just outside Loughborough. The station has an historic road transport collection, a miniature railway and other attractions. The railway operates every Sunday and bank holiday Monday from Easter to late October. There are plans to join it to the preserved portion of the railway which currently operates from Loughborough Central to Leicester North, known as the Loughborough Gap

== Notable people ==
- Richard Henson (1864–1930), cricketer

== See also ==
- Listed buildings in Ruddington
- St Peter's Church, Flawford
- Ruddington Hall
