= Kent (disambiguation) =

Kent is a county in South East England.

Kent may also refer to:

== Places ==
- Kent County (disambiguation)
- Fort Kent (disambiguation)
- Kent Island (disambiguation)
- Kent Street (disambiguation)
- Kent Township (disambiguation)

=== Australia ===
- Kent, the former name of Kent Land District, Tasmania
- Kent Group of islands, in Bass Strait
- Kent Town
- Shire of Kent, Western Australia

=== Canada ===
- Kent (New Brunswick federal electoral district) (1867–1966)
- Kent (New Brunswick provincial electoral district, 1827–1974)
- Kent (New Brunswick provincial electoral district, 1994–2013)
- Kent (Ontario federal electoral district) (1867–1903; 1914–1966; 1976–1996)
- Kent (Ontario provincial electoral district) (1867–1875, 1967–1987)
- Kent, British Columbia
- Kent Parish, New Brunswick, civil parish in Carleton County, New Brunswick
- Kent Peninsula, in Nunavut

=== Kazakhstan ===
- Kent Range, Kazakhstan

=== Sierra Leone ===
- Kent, Sierra Leone, a village

=== United Kingdom ===
- Kent (constituency), former constituency
- Kingdom of Kent, originally The Kingdom of the Kentish, an early medieval kingdom
- River Kent, in Cumbria, northern England

=== United States ===
- Kent, California, former name of Kentfield, California
- Kent, Connecticut
- Kent, Florida
- Kent, Iowa
- Kent, Illinois
- Kent, Jefferson County, Indiana
- Kent Narrows, a waterway in Maryland
- Kent, Minnesota
- Kent, New York
- Kent, Ohio
- Kent, Oregon
- Kent, Texas
- Kent, Washington
- Kent (Washington, D.C.), a neighborhood
- Kent, West Virginia

== People ==
- Kent (given name)
- Kent (surname)
- Duke of Kent
- Earl of Kent

== Brands and enterprises ==
- Kent (brand), an electric guitar brand
- Kent (cigarette), a cigarette brand
- Kent Building Supplies, Canadian retail hardware chain
- Kent International, an American bicycle manufacturer
- KENT (AM), a radio station (1540 kHz) in Enterprise, Nevada, United States owned by ESNE Radio
- KAZZ (AM), a radio station (1400 kHz) in Parowan, Utah, United States, which held the call sign KENT from 2004 to 2014
- Kentz or Kent PLC, engineering company

== Education ==
=== United Kingdom ===
- University of Kent, Kent, England

=== United States ===
- Kent Hall at Columbia University in New York City
- Kent School, a private high school in Kent, Connecticut
- Kent State University, public research university in Kent, Ohio

== Music ==
- Kent (band), a Swedish rock band
  - Kent (album), their first album
- Kent (guitar), an electric guitar series
- Kent Records, a record label

== Sports ==
- Kent County Cricket Club, a first-class county club of England and Wales
- Kent Football United F.C., was a semi-professional football club dissolved 2022
- Kent Rugby Football Union, the governing body for rugby in the county of Kent

== Transportation ==
- Cork Kent railway station, in Ireland
- Ford Kent engine, used in for instance Ford Anglia
- HMS Kent, a ship
- Kent (East Indiaman), a number of East Indiamen carried the name Kent
- Kent Station (OC Transpo), a bus stop in Ottawa's downtown transit corridor

== Other uses ==
- Kent (mango), a cultivar from Florida, USA
- Kent Institution, a maximum-security prison in Agassiz, British Columbia, Canada
- AS-15 Kent, the NATO codename for the Russian Kh-55 cruise missile
- Kent, an alternate name for the card game Kemps

== See also ==
- Cent (disambiguation)
