= List of Cornish wrestlers =

This article is a list of practitioners of Cornish wrestling, as well as the related martial art Devon wrestling.

Historically, there were simultaneous claimants to world, national and regional titles in Cornish wrestling. This was driven, at least in part, by there not being agreement concerning the definitive governing bodies in the sport until the 1920s.

Some of these wrestlers also competed in other wrestling styles, or in matches where multiple styles were used.

== British Isles ==
=== Cornwall ===
- Stanton became the Cornish wrestling champion of Cornwall at a tournament in Penzance, in the fifteenth century. It is said that the wrestler was named this after chants at the tournament of "Stand-to-un, boy!"
- John Goit was a friend of Richard Carew who states that during the reign of Elizabeth I, he had a claim to be the best wrestler in Cornwall.
- The Vicar of Lanteglos-by-Fowey was described in 1586 as "the best wrastler in Cornwall."
- Lyttelton Weynorth wrestled several times before Charles II, being introduced by the Earl of Radnor. He was the champion wrestler of all England.
- Thomas Hosken of Cubert defeated Lyttelton Weynorth and was described as "the strongest man in the county."
- James Harris, of St Agnes, was commonly called "Skinner" and "beat all and sundry" and was the court wrestler of Charles II. He "shortened his days by the sport".
- William Nott from St Gorran was a farmer who had much competition success at the end of the 1600s and was known as the "philosopher".
- Charles Dawe from St Gorran was referred to by Thomas Tonkin (1678–1742) as being without equal in the early 1700s.
- William Pascoe (1722–1808), the parish clark of Sithney for 60 years, was the champion of Cornwall for many years.
- Thomas Pearce, wrestled throughout Britain in the mid-1700s.
- Abel Werry (?-1824), from Liskeard was for many years the champion wrestler of Cornwall.
- Absalom Bennetts from Probus is described as having won well over 42 gold laced hats during the 18th century. He won the Probus tournament seven years running.
- John Truscott (1766–1848), from Roche, was a champion Cornish wrestler, competing with an 'East Cornwall' style. He won a famous match with the Giant Jordan in 1813. His brothers, George (known as the 'Big Truscott') and Diggory (known as 'Young Truscott'), were also well known wrestlers.
- John Lander was a noted wrestler during the late 1700s and early 1800s. He was landlord of the Fighting Cocks Inn in Truro and was the father of the famous explorers John Lander and Richard Lander.
- Richard Jolly (1782–1848) from Penscawen, St Enoder, was a successful wrestler between 1808 and 1816.

Richard Parkyn

- Richard Parkyn (1772–1855), weighing 16 and a half stone, was a champion wrestler from St Columb Major and was known as The Great Parkyn. He was champion of Cornwall in 1806 and it was said that he was undefeated 20 years thereafter. He was dominant from 1795 through to 1811.
- Jacob Halls (1782–1876), born on the Biscovallick estate, St Austell was a very powerful farmer who won many gold laced hats in his youth.
- John Collings (1783–1869) from St Minver was a celebrated wrestler in his early life. He also had a famous wrestling brother called Thomas.

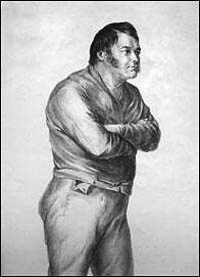
James Polkinghorne

- James Polkinghorne (1788–1851) born at St Keverne was a champion wrestler who had a number of famous contests against Devon fighters, including Flower, Jackman (1816) and Abraham Cann (1826), which drew very large crowds of spectators (c17,000).
- Simon Searle Lanyon was a member of the Cornish Yeomanry Cavalry and was famed for his athleticism. It was said that Polkinghorne could not stand up to him.
- Abraham Bastard (1789–1868), born in St Teath, beat Polkinghorne in a famous match at St Kew in the 1820s. He later became a preacher.
- Francis Olver had much success in the early 1800s, including at least once beating Abraham Cann, James Cann and Finney. HIs brother also wrestled.
- James Warren (1786-1842) from St Just was a famed Cornish wrestler, who became champion of Cornwall. He was known as 'Little Jem Warren' or 'Little Hercules' due to being 5 feet 7.5 inches high or 'Great Jem' from having prodigious strength. He distinguished himself in the rescue of survivors when the East Indiaman ship, "Kent" caught fire.
- Henry Cuttance (1807-?), from St Keverne, was a champion Cornish wrestler who the initiator in rallying the local people to assist in the rescue of the crew of the Norwegian schooner, the Elizabeth of Bergen, when it ran aground in 1846.
- Proctor Grose from St Kew was considered the strongest man in Cornwall and won many wrestling prize in Devon and Cornwall in the early 1800s.
- Thomas Nicholas (1816-?) was 3 feet eight inches high and weighed about fifteen stone and was considered champion of the West of Cornwall and perhaps of all of Cornwall between 1835 and 1838. He trained Gundry and was known as "Tom Pike".
- Tom Magor from Breage was for some time All England Champion in the early 1800s. He trained Gundry and was a miner at Wheal Vor.
- Captain Thomas Gundry (1816-1888), of Wendron, was 5 feet 9 inches high, weighed 178 lbs and was a very famous champion wrestler in the 1830s and 1840s. His father was "Boxer" Gundry and his mother was from the Giddles wrestling family. He was trained by Tom Magor and Tom Nicholas. His wrestling record comprised at least 25 tournament wins and 5 second placements from tournaments in Cornwall, Devon and London. He was 7 times Cornish champion. He was the champion wrestler of all England. He was called champion wrestler of the world in 1847. He was married four times. In 1870, along with a wrestler called White, Tom rescued six or seven lives from a raging sea.
- James Dyer was champion of Devon and Cornwall in 1843.
- John Roberts (1820–1892) known as "Johnnah" or "John-a" and born at Newtown, Ludgvan, was a famous champion heavyweight wrestler in the 1840s and 1850s, that more than once beat Gundry. After one such occasion, at the Penzance tournament, he was marched from one end of the town to the other accompanied by the mayor, several dignitaries and a band. He was subsequently the "quiet and unobtrusive" landlord of the "Old Inn" at Gulval for 30 years.
- Charles Bowden was lightweight champion of Cornwall in 1851.
- William Delbridge (1823–1886) was originally from St Agnes and was lightweight champion of Cornwall in 1857. He then emigrated to Australia, where he was a respected stickler at many tournaments. He became the owner of a well known vineyard.
- Captain Joseph Hodge (1824–1909) was champion of Cornwall in 1839 and London champion in 1848.
- William Couch Jeffery (1826–1899), from Long Rock was champion middleweight of Cornwall for a quarter of a century including the 1840s and 1850s. He won many prizes in Cornwall as well as London. He was initially a miner and then a market gardener and fisherman. He spent some time in Australia and it was said that he had beaten the Australian champion wrestler, who was an Irishman after walking 160 miles to the match.
- James Bullocke (1834-?), from St Austell, was 6 feet tall and weighed 220 lbs and a champion wrestler who was champion of Cornwall in 1860 having defeated Treglown.
- William Treglown (1827–1864) from Ludgvan, weighed between 200 lbs and 220 lbs, was about 5 ft 6in high and was the champion of Cornwall in 1853, 1854, 1856, 1858, 1861 and 1862. He won the London title in 1854 and 1859. He won the West of England title in 1853. He was the American champion in 1856. He died of consumption in St Mewan. He also wrestled in Europe.
- John Murton was lightweight champion in the mid-1800s.
- Polmear was a champion Cornish wrestler in the 1860s.

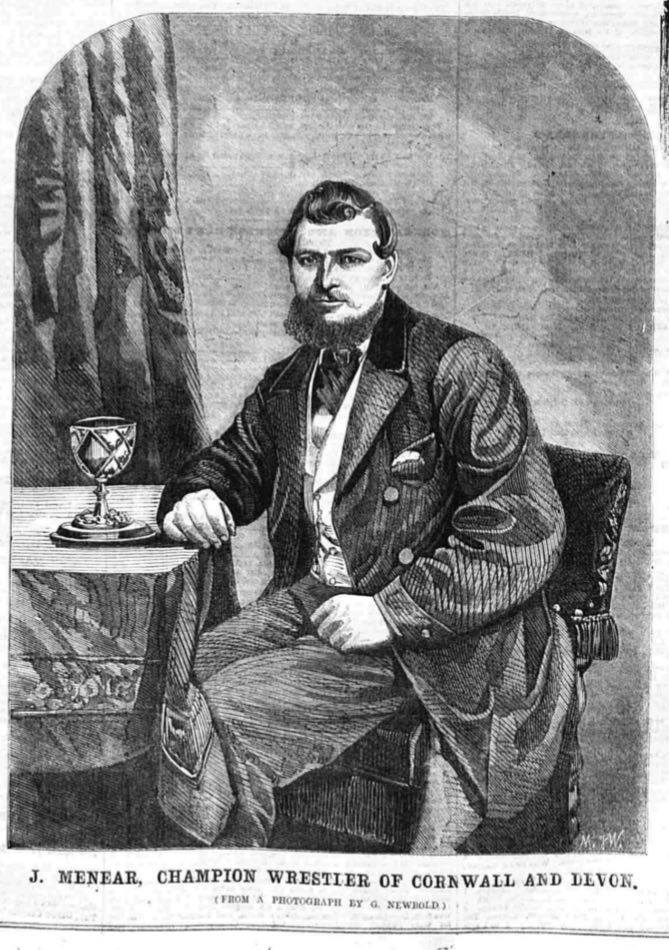
Joseph Menear 1864

- Joseph Menear (1837 -1923) was born in Tregonissey, St Austell and won the London Cornish wrestling title for over 10 years in a row and won over 100 prizes, cups, belts and medals. He had a brother John who had some wrestling success.
- William Pollard from Linkinhorne won many tournaments from the mid to late 1800s. He became champion of England. He was 6 feet 2 inches high and weighed 220 pounds. He was champion of Cornwall for seven years to 1869.
- Samuel Rundle (1847-?), of St Austell, weighing 7 st 10 lbs and known as "Sammy Short", was all England Cornish wrestling champion in 1874, retaining the title for 20 years. He was champion of England in 1876 and in 1883 and in 1898 had been champion of England for "many years". In 1884 he had been champion of Devon and Cornwall for 12 years. Sam also wrestled successfully in the United States.
- Philip Hancock (1846–1927) of St Austell was the World Cornish Wrestling champion in 1884, winning the "open to the world" belt in Penzance. He was known as "Phep", "Phip" or the "fat'un". He was 5 ft 9in and won the champion belt of Devon and Cornwall, wrestling in front of the Prince of Wales. He claimed that he was never thrown or beaten in 28 years in competitions across the UK. He helped build the Eddystone Lighthouse and the Wolf Rock Lighthouse.
- Captain Samuel Coombe (1849-?), from Bugle, known as "Sammy", was a very strong wrestler who had some famous bouts with Hancock, who said he was as good a wrestler as he ever faced. He was heavyweight Cornish wrestling champion of Cornwall. When Sammy ceased wrestling he became a renowned Methodist preacher after teaching himself to read and write from reading the bible.
- William Lucking was lightweight champion of Cornwall in 1887.
- Richard Williams (1851–1892), born in Chacewater, 5 feet 6 inches high and weighing 144 lbs, was known as 'Schiller Williams' after surviving the wreck of the Schiller and helping save some of the other few survivors. He was a well known, champion wrestler in Cornwall, the US, England, Northern Ireland, Bolivia and Mexico. He was Western states champion in the US and was lightweight champion of Cornwall. He died in Mexico. He became lightweight champion of Cornwall in 1887 after beating William Lucking in Wales.

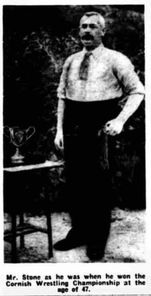
Thomas Stone 1899

- Thomas Stone (1852–1937) of St Austell, was a well known wrestler, who won over 20 tournaments in the mid to late 1800s. He was wrestling champion of Cornwall in 1896 and 1899. He wrestled in front of King Edward VII, who gave him a sovereign that he kept as a keepsake. His brother Henry was also an accomplished wrestler and was champion of Cornwall in 1891 after Tom had been disqualified. He was a worker in the china clay industry.
- Thomas Bragg (1852–1924) was born in Foxhole and was champion of America in 1866, 1876, 1879, 1880, 1882, and 1883. He was champion of Cornwall in 1882. He was champion of England in 1887. He also fought under the name, "Dan Lewis, the Strangler", in other wrestling styles, both in the UK and in Europe.
- John Pearce (1859-1896), from Wendron and known as "Jack", was the champion of Cornwall in 1887 and held the title for 6 years. He won over 24 tournaments in England and the United States. John also claimed to be world Cornish wrestling champion in 1884, 1886, 1887, 1888, 1889, 1893 and in 1894. He had brothers Nicholas and Walter who had some wrestling success.
- John Capell (1859–1932), from Talskiddy, St Columb, was heavyweight champion of Cornwall in 1890 and 1898 and Champion of the West of England in 1890.
- Alfred Ernest Trenoweth (1868–1942) from Falmouth was well known as light weight champion wrestler of Cornwall. He was a carpenter and joiner and was also lightweight boxing champion of Kent.
- James Matthews, from Chapel Street, St Day, was a champion wrestler, who is especially notable, since he only had one arm!
- Pellew, from Falmouth was a champion wrestler, who is especially notable, since he also only had one arm!
- Jeffries from St Mewan was Cornish wrestling champion of America.
- Earnest Small, from Penzance, was West of England champion in 1906. He was Cornish champion in 1906 defeating Sidney and Reuben Chapman. He defeated Ahmed Madrali.
- Reuben Chaman (1881-1930), known as "Reub", from the famous Chapman family of St Wenn that has won many titles throughout the last century, was champion of Cornwall from 1903 to 1910 and in 1914. He was a rabbit trapper as a young man. He also fought and won matches in the US.
- Sidney Chapman (1889-?), from the famous Chapman family of St Wenn that has won many titles throughout the last century, won the championship of Cornwall in 1903, 1907, 1912, 1913, 1919 and 1920. He beat Tim Harrington in 1909 and was the middleweight champion of the US in 1910. He was awarded a medal by the Transvaal wrestling association in 1911 for his wrestling in South Africa and was the champion of South Africa in 1911 and 1912. He also fought in Australia.
- Francis Gregory (1904-?), from Roche, was a champion Cornish wrestler in the 1920s and 1930s who won the heavyweight title 9 times in a row and the interceltic title 7 times in a row. He was champion of Britain in 1934. He was a famous sportsman, being a professional wrestler and boxer, who played league and union rugby (including for England). He participated in the first televised wrestling match and wrestled Billy Holland in a scene for the film Breakers Ahead.

=== England ===
==== Devon ====
- John Ridd, from Devon, held the championship belt for Devon and Cornwall in about 1685.
- John Coppe, known as "Little Cock", came from near Great Torrington, was about 5 feet 5 inches high and bow-legged and in the middle of the 18th century was champion throughout Devon, Somerset and Cornwall, for about 20 years.
- William Wreyford (1755–1838) from Cheriton Bishop was one of the best wrestlers in the Western counties if not in all England at the end of the eighteenth century.
- William Ford (1784–1874), from Zeal Monachorum, was a wrestler of great reputation in North Devon.
- John Jordan (1787-1818), from Grantham near Hatherleigh and known as "Giant Jordan" or the "Devonshire Giant", was a famously massive champion wrestler from Devon who was 6 feet 4 inches tall. He fought in the early 1800s and had a series of famous matches with Cann. He was champion of Devon in 1811 and 1812. He also had famous matches with the Great Parkyn (1811) and John Truscott (1813), both of which he lost.
- William Wreford (1793-1835), who lived at Cheriton Cross between Okehampton and Exeter, was 5 feet 10 inches tall and was a sightless champion in the early 1800s. He was known as 'Blind Bill'. He was always allowed a grip on his opponent's collar at the start of a hitch.
- John Bolt (1793–1875), from Cheriton Bishop, was a farmer and a champion wrestler throughout Britain and was Cann's second in his fight with Polkinghorne.
- Charles Cleeve of Kenton was champion of England in 1827.
- William Wreford (1793-1866) was born at Morchard Bishop was a champion Devonian wrestler of whom Abraham Cann said he was the "best best man he ever took by the collar". He came to fame after throwing Giant Jordan at the Crediton competition in 1812.

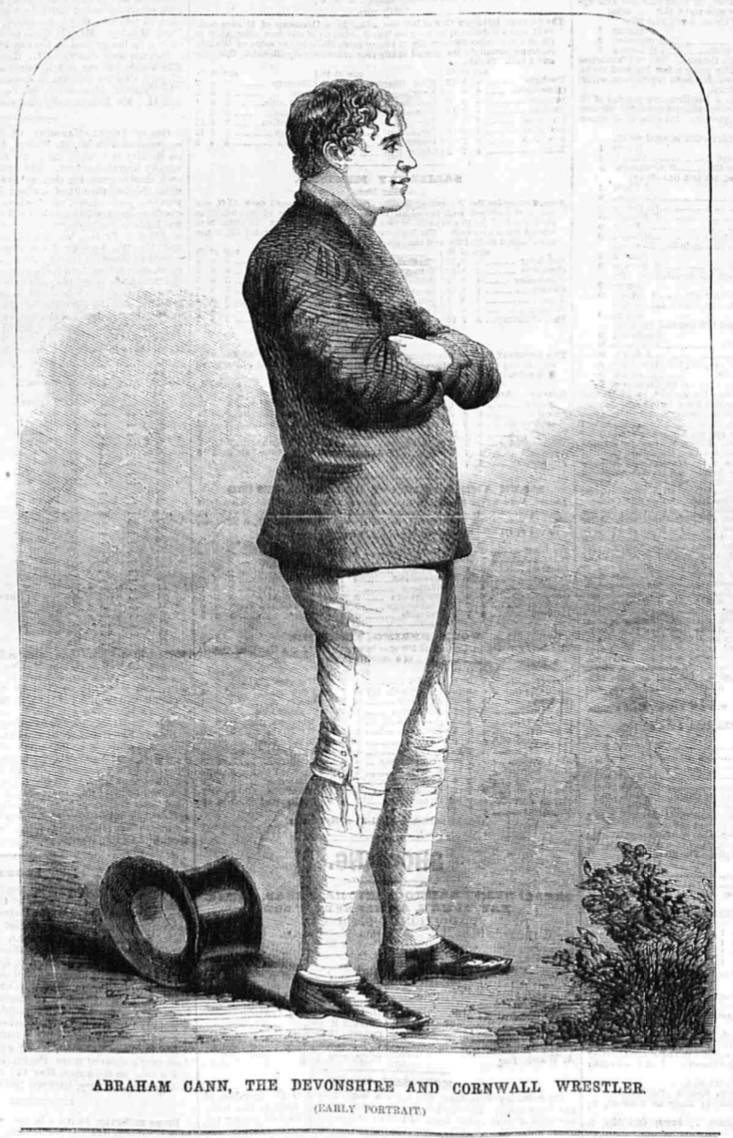
Abraham Cann 1864

- Abraham Cann (1794-1864) was born in Crediton and was a famous wrestler who had an infamous wrestling match with James Polkinghorne in Devonport in 1826, watched by a crowd of over 10,000. After discussions between the triers, the match was declared a draw. A song was written about the match. He was the champion wrestler of England. It was claimed that he became champion of the world. His father, Robert, and brothers: James (?-1849), Robert, George and William (1793-1872) were also successful wrestlers. Cann had defeated John Jordan, Flower, Wreyford, Simon Webber, and the other good wrestlers in Devon, and carried off the prizes at many of the places where he became a competitor.
- James Truscott (1804–1891), born on West Street, Tavistock and often called 'Jemmy', weighing 10st (63 kg), claimed to be the English lightweight champion in 1845. He later managed many wrestling matches and tournaments in London and tended to open the events with a shout of "A hat! A hat!". He was also a boxer and was one of the founders of the Patriotic Club at Clerkenwell Green.
- William Chapple from Bishop's Nympton, was champion of Devon in 1841, 1844, 1845 and 1847. He was champion of England in 1842 and 1847.
- William Davy May (1817–1842) was champion of England in 1841. During his career, he threw the best men of Devon and Cornwall, including the Gundrys, Ellicombe, Matthews, Chapple and Upton.

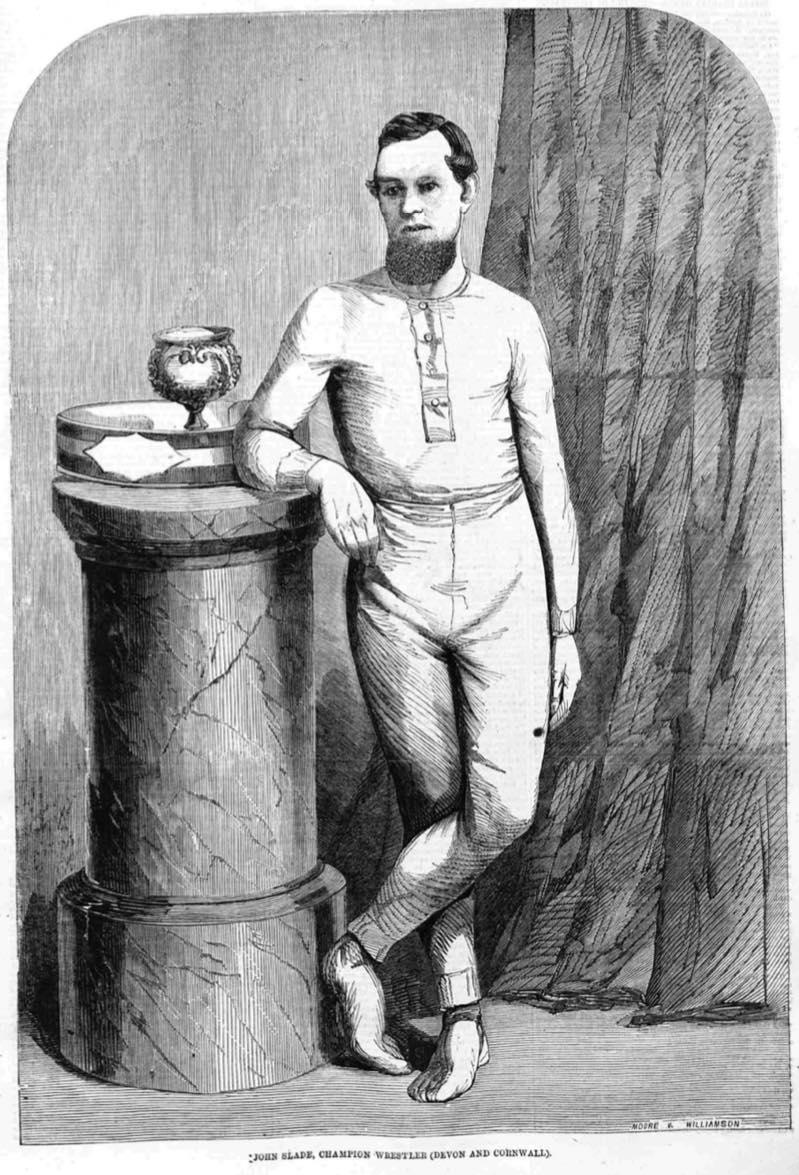
John Slade 1866

- John Slade, known as 'Jack Slade', held the Devon title for many years in the mid 19th century. He won the Prince of Wales Cup and the Duke of Cornwall Cup and a large number of tournaments and matches. He was all weights champion of England in 1860.
- Thomas Cooper (1823–1875), born at Sampford Courtenay, won many tournaments and was the four Western counties champion in the 1860s through to 1870. He was champion of West of England in 1859, 1869 and 1870. and reported to be champion of England in 1869. He was champion of Devon in 1852, 1858, 1870, 1871, 1873 and 1874. He had a brother John, 3 years his senior, who had some tournament success and who lived on the farm where Abraham Cann was born.
- Frank Hutchings from Moreton was Cornish wrestling champion of England in 1877, beating Phil Hancock.
- Robert Baker (1847-?) of Bow was champion of England in 1879, throwing Pike in the 10th round of the second day. He was also Devon champion in 1879. He had a brother Thomas who also had some success.
- Richard Pike (1850-1909) of Bow was a champion wrestler in the 1880s and 1890s and was referred to as the "great Pike", sometimes fighting under the name of "Shepherd". He was about 6 feet 2 inches high and weighed 244 lbs. He was champion of Devon in between 1878 and 1881. He was champion of England in 1882. He was world champion in 1894. He was West of England champion for 17 years.
- Samuel Battershill (1855–1902) of Bow was champion of Devon from 1885 through to 1887.
- John Stentiford (1862-?) from Drewsteignton was in the Royal Marine Light Infantry, weighed 14 stone 4 lbs and was 5 feet 9 inches high. He won many first prizes in tournaments towards the end of the 1800s in Devon and Cornwall, including beating John Capell. He lost a title match for the world championship in 1888 against Jack Pearce after wrestling over two days.

==== Rest of England ====
- Rev Richard Stevens (c1670-1727), fellow of King's College, Cambridge and proctor of the university (1691), was a well known Cornish wrestler in the 17th century. He was born in Truro.

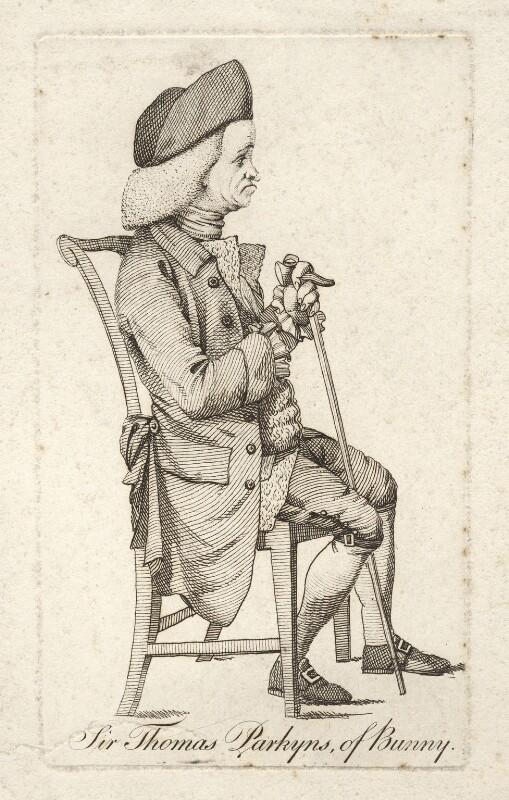
Sir Thomas Parkyns 1713

- Sir Thomas Parkyns (1664–1741), the "Wrestling Baronet", was a student of Isaac Newton before he learnt his Cornish wrestling in Gray's Inn in London. He wrote one of the first books giving detailed instructions on hand-to-hand combat using Cornish wrestling techniques called The Inn-play or Cornish Hugg Wrestler, published in 1713. In 1712 he set up an annual Cornish wrestling tournament at his estate in Bunny which continued until 1810.
- Richard Rowe, originally from Cornwall, took up his residence at Cambridge University in 1740. Both he and his son were famous wrestlers and botanists.
- Isaac Newton, from Rempstone, was one of England's best wrestlers in the mid-1700s. He won the Bunny tournament 5 times and it was said that he only lost one wrestling match.
- Richard Thurlby, from Nailstone, was one of England's best wrestlers in the mid-1700s. He won the Bunny tournament in 1762 after beating Isaac Newton.
- George Nailor, from Beeston, won the Bunny tournament 5 times in the early 1800s.
- Charles Layton was the Norfolk champion from 1817 to 1827.
- Clargo (also spelt Claggo in the newspapers) claimed to be the Berkshire Cornish wrestling champion in 1828.
- William Matthews was champion of Dorset in 1841 and in 1842.
- John Goodman of the Blues was the London champion in 1845.
- Joe Milton was the champion Somerset wrestler in 1869.

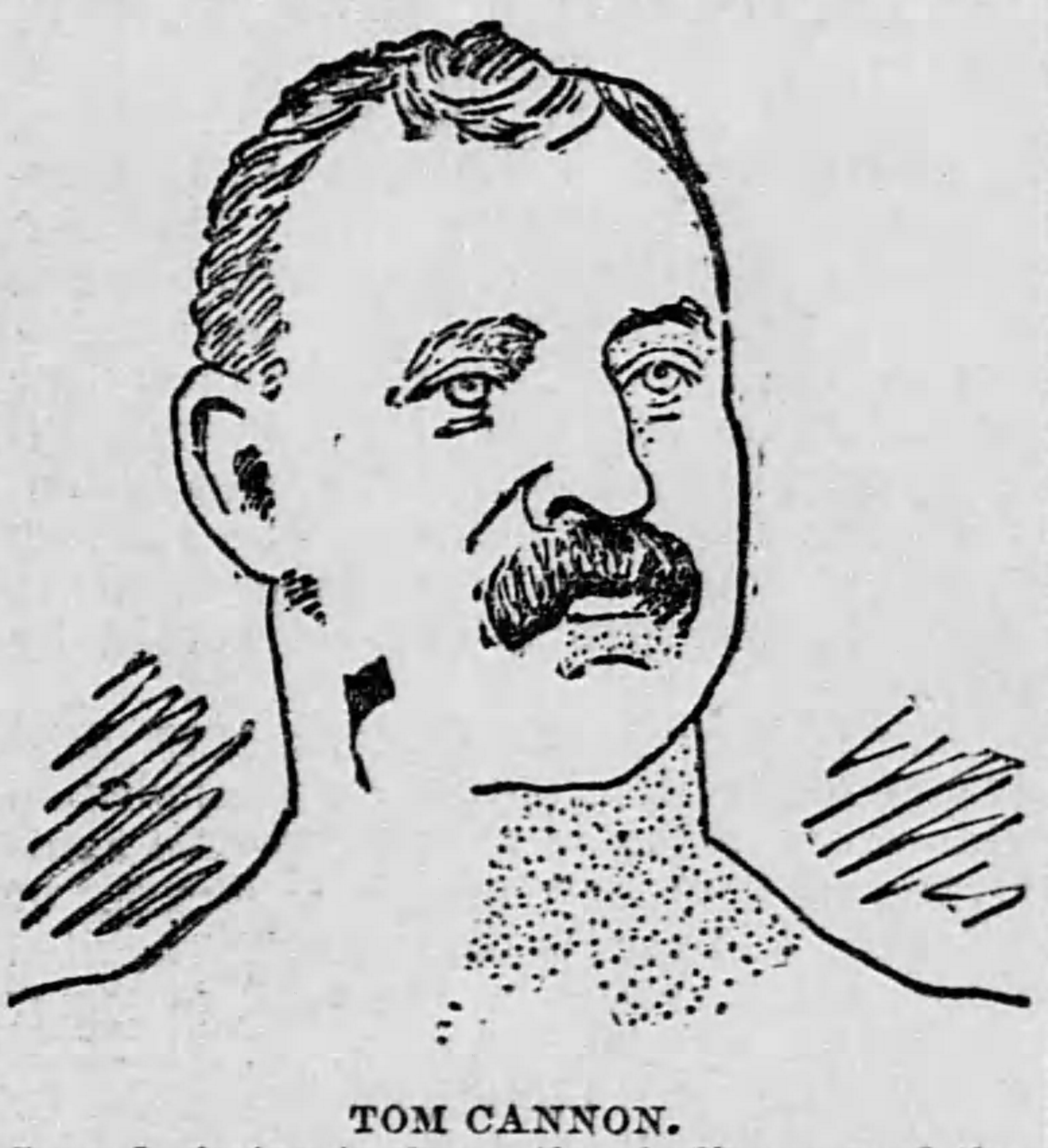
Tom Cannon 1885

- Tom Cannon (1852-?) wrestled in Cornish wrestling matches in the late 19th and early 20th centuries, including winning a tournament, beating 22 other competitors. He wrestled in the UK, the US, France and Australia in many wrestling styles, including becoming world Greco-Roman wrestling champion in 1886 and 1894.
- Tom Waters claimed to be the Cornish wrestling champion of the North of England in 1884.
- Jack Wannop (1854–1923) was champion of London in 1892. He wrestled in other styles in the UK and United States. He was also a boxer.
- Joe Faulkner was 12 stone champion of the world in 1895.
- Charles Cawkell was a member of Britain's first international judo team who, along with Tani, competed in Cornish wrestling tournaments in the late 1920s, but with limited success.

=== Ireland ===
- Saffney was champion of Ireland in 1826 and fought with Cann in 1826.
- Philip Gaffney, the "Irish giant", was an Irish champion in the early 1800s. He was champion of Ireland in 1827. He was London champion in 1828.
- Finney was a tall Irish champion in the early 1800s who at least once defeated Abraham Cann.
- Larkins was the Irish champion in 1827.
- Moorish of the 4th Royal Irish Dragoon Guards was 5 ft 5in high and competed at the highest level in the early 1800s.
- Simon Finn (1812 won the all-weights championship belt at the first annual meeting of the Devon and Cornish wrestling Society at Lambeth in 1849. He was the Irish champion in 1847 and in 1849.
- Flyn was a highly regarded Irishman that wrestled in Cornish wrestling tournaments in London in the mid-1800s.
- McMahon was the Irish champion who fought in America in the 1870s.

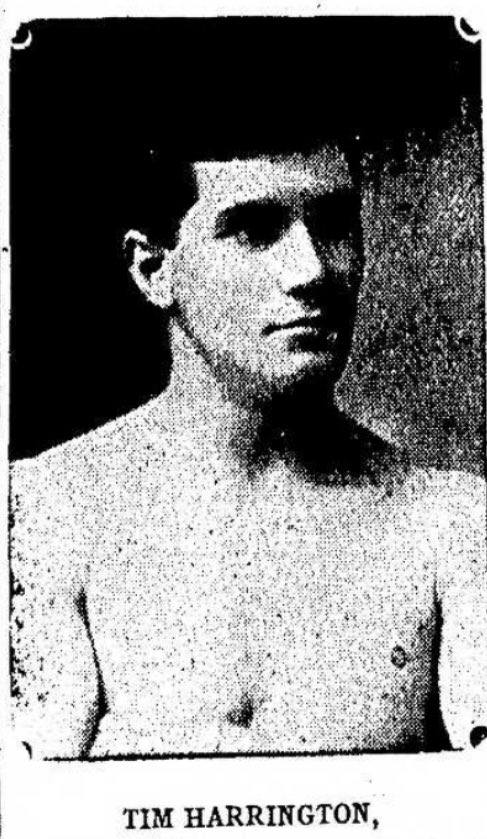
Tim Harrington 1907

- Timothy Corby Harrington (1873–1925), was born in the Beara Peninsula in Ireland and emigrated to the US in about 1875. He claimed the world Cornish wrestling middleweight title in 1903 and retained it until his death. In 1902, Tim was arrested on the charge of insanity. It took 5 policemen to subdue him. He had a brother Peter, who also has some wrestling success. Tim beat Frank Gotch in a Cornish wrestling match.
- Molly Russell, was Lady Cornish wrestling champion of the world in 1904. She was a crack shot, fencer and fought in other wrestling styles.
- Pat Connolly was an Irish champion that fought successfully in Cornish wrestling tournaments in Michigan in the early 1900s.

=== Scotland ===
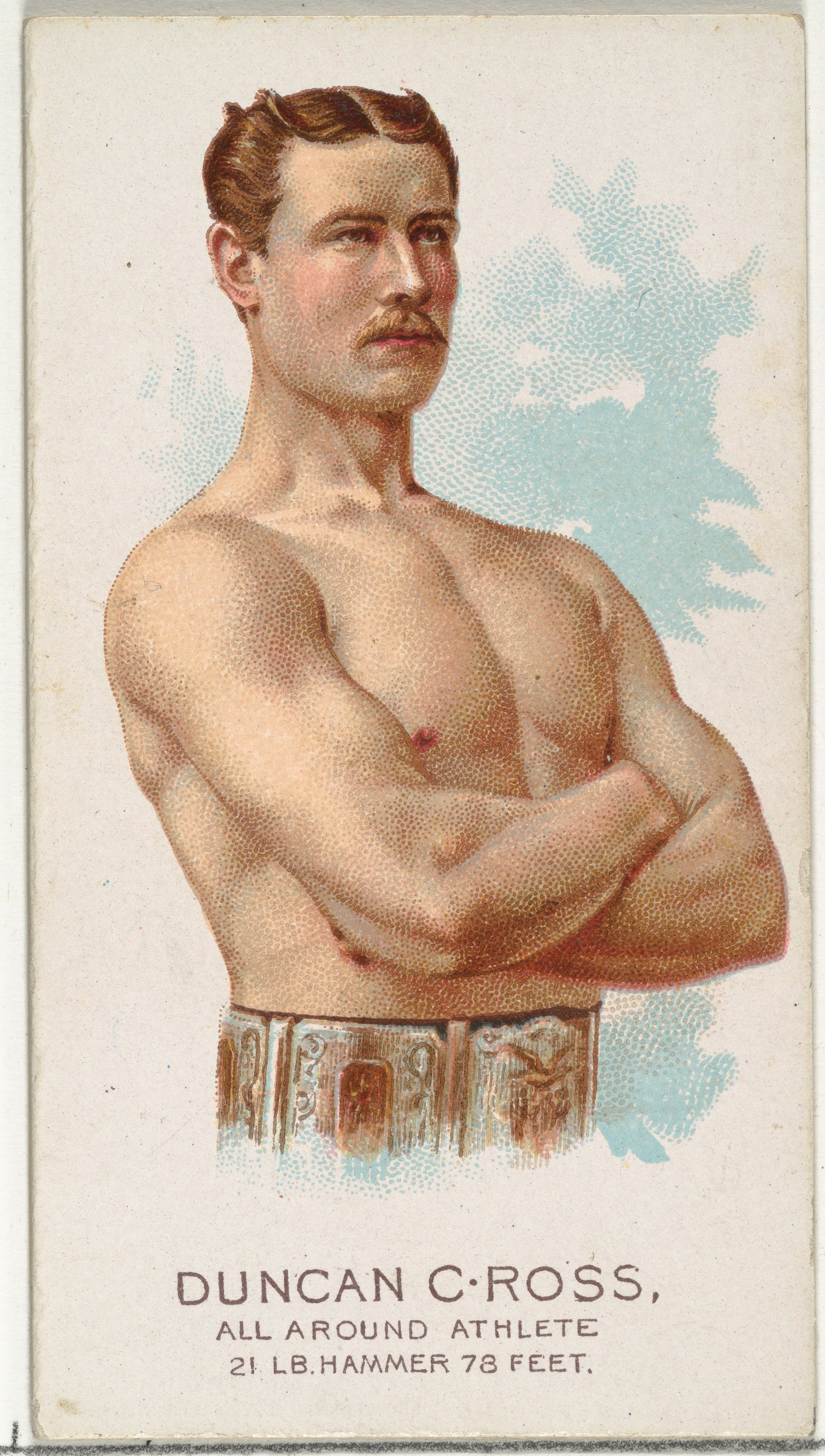
Duncan Cameron Ross 1888

- Donald Dinnie (1837–1916) was a famous Scotch athlete who competed in challenge mixed wrestling matches, which included Cornish wrestling, in the 1880s and 1890s in New Zealand and Australia.
- Duncan Cameron Ross (1856–1919) was another famous Scotch athlete who was the Cornish wrestling champion of New Zealand in 1891. He also fought in mixed style challenge matches including Cornish wrestling in the US in the 1890s. He also claimed the all round championship at wrestling and weight throwing.

=== Wales ===
- John Rowe was a Welsh champion Cornish wrestler during the 1870s.
- Evan Lewis (1860–1919), known as the "strangler" and from Welsh descent, was a champion wrestler in the US, in various styles. In the early 1880s he competed in Cornish wrestling tournaments and challenge matches with various opponents including Jack Carkeek, with whom he lost a series of matches. In the 1890s he competed in mixed style challenge matches, which included Cornish wrestling, including beating Jack King a couple of times. Note that his brother Rees Lewis also fought in Cornish wrestling challenge matches in the 1880s.
- Richard Pike from Barry was West of England champion in 1895.
- Jack Lamnea, known as "Swansea Jack" and "Lemm" became all England Cornish style wrestling champion in 1903.
- Nancy Jones, was Lady Cornish wrestling champion of Wales in 1904.

== Algeria ==
- Mourzouk had a famous Cornish wrestling match with Jack Carkeek in Australia in 1904. He was a champion in Greco-Roman wrestling.

== Australia ==
- Jesse Liddicoat was a very strong immigrant Cornish wrestler.
- Nicholas was Cornish wrestling champion of South Australia in 1842.
- James Chipman was Cornish wrestling champion of South Australia in 1851.
- William Hodge (1815-?), originally from Sithney, and won many tournaments in the UK before emigrating, including beating Gundry in Penzance in 1843. He was an Australian Cornish wrestling champion in the late 1840s and early 1850s, winning over 80 prizes. He was 5 feet 10 inches high and weighed 174 lbs. He was champion of Australia in 1851, beating James Chipman for the title. He was champion of Australasia in 1851. He was owner of the Brecknock Arms in Adelaide which was the venue for many tournaments and challenge matches.
- William Kneebone (1829–1906), was recognised Australian Cornish wrestling champion in the 1850s. He once came home and caught a burglar. He explained the battered state of the burglar to the bench by saying he had given him a Flying Mare.
- John Charles Corse (1825–1872), originally from St Neot, Cornwall, was about 6 feet and 15 stone and was a champion Cornish wrestler. In newspaper articles his surname was also spelt 'Caurse', 'Cors', 'Coss', 'Cause', 'Cawse', 'Cawrce' and 'Cawrse'. He was a blacksmith and claimed to have thrown Gundry before emigrating. He was champion of Victoria and was Cornish wrestling champion of Australia in 1857. In 1852 he was champion of New South Wales and was known as the "Sydney Champion" and beat Hodge in a high-profile challenge match taking the Australian title. He successfully defended the title in 1856 against Burns. He was murdered by being shot in the back of the head.
- Captain James Williams White (1826–1903), born on St Mary's, Isles of Scilly and lived in Burra, South Australia since 1856, was a champion wrestler in the Cornish style.
- Dick Bray, known as "Curley" and weighing about 11 stone, was a champion Australian Cornish wrestler of the 1860s.
- John H Bray, known as Dancing Bray", was a champion wrestler, winning an important competition in 1868.
- Joe Williams, originally from Crowan emigrated to mine in Australia in the mid-1800s. He won the Cornish wrestling championship of Australia, gaining the championship belt and a large gold cup.
- G Philips (1846–1922), was a noted Cornish wrestler in his youth.
- John Thomas (1844-?), known as "Jack" and from Eaglehawk, was heavyweight champion of Australia for many years. His wrestling career spanned from 1871 to 1899. He won over 100 first prizes in England, Victoria, New South Wales, South Australia, Queensland and New Zealand in many wrestling styles. He was champion of Victoria in 1879.
- Stephens was the lightweight Cornish wrestling champion of Australia in 1879.
- Jack Tamblyn (1849-?), was a champion Cornish wrestler.
- John Walker (1857–1913), known as " Wrastling Jack", was Cornish wrestling champion of the Barrier towards the end of the 1800s. In later life he suffered from lead poisoning.
- Thomas was champion Cornish wrestler of Australia in 1884. He was previously Cumberland and Westmorland wrestling champion.
- Connors claimed to be world Cornish wrestling champion in 1886.
- Jacob Burrows was an Australian Cornish wrestling champion in 1887. He was "an effective preacher to the Cornish miners".
- W Williams was Australian Cornish wrestling champion in 1889.
- Charles Colwell was Australian Cornish wrestling champion in the late 1800s who was especially notable for having only one arm.
- Henry Randall Neilson (1867–1925), known as "Delhi Neilson" and the "Bendigo Boy", was Australian Cornish wrestling champion between 1889 and 1907, weighing 10 st 7 lbs, who was said to have defeated over 400 opponents. He was an Australian rules footballer. In 1908, 1909 and 1910 he was middleweight Cornish wrestling champion of South Africa. He was the Cornish wrestling champion of the Barrier in 1890 and 1891.
- Mons Victor was an Australian champion Cornish wrestler in 1898.
- Harry Pearce, was Australian champion Cornish wrestler from 1897 to 1904.
- Dick Porter became middleweight wrestling champion of Australia, beating Delhi Neilson in 1906.
- Rundle was the 1907 champion of Australia, who also fought in South Africa.
- George Dinnie was the 1907 Cornish wrestling champion of Western Australia.
- Colin Roberts was Australian national Cornish wrestling champion in 2000.
- Gavin Dickson from Sydney won the Australian Cornish wrestling championship in 2001 in front of 30,000 people at the Cornish festival in Moonta.

== Austria ==
- Fred Oberlander (1911–1996), was born in Vienna and fought successfully in various wrestling styles in Austria, Britain and Canada. He fought in Cornish wrestling tournaments in the 1940s.

== Bolivia ==
- Roeder had a famous wrestling match with Schiller Williams in the 1890s, which he lost.

== Brazil ==
- R Hodge was Morro Velho mines Cornish wrestling champion in 1860.

== Canada ==
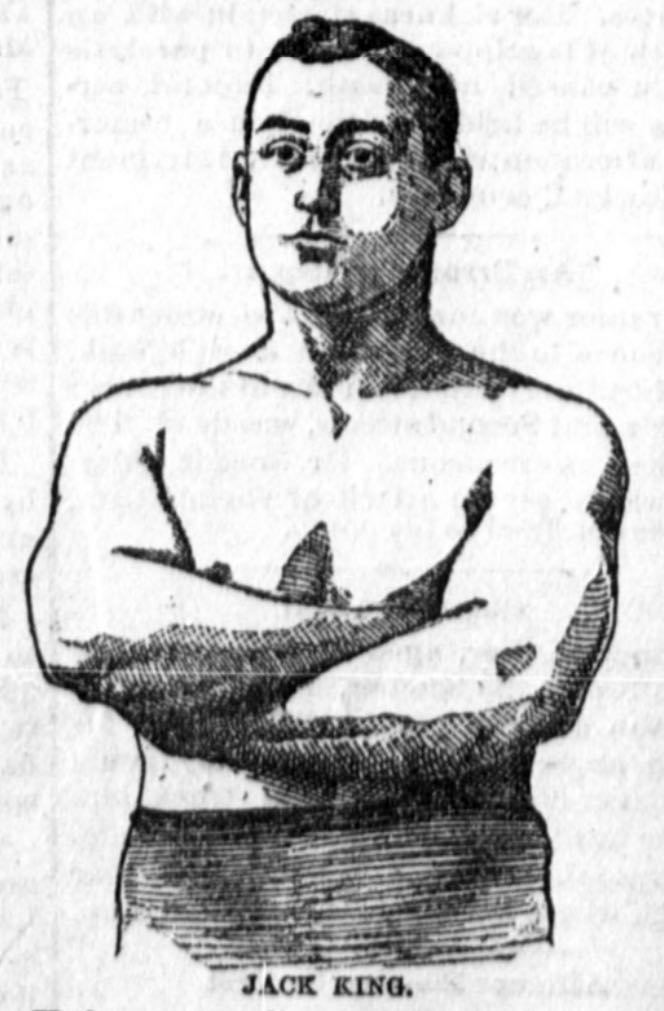
Jack King 1891

- Captain Jack King (1867-?) was born in Bruce Mines, Canada, moved to the US and eventually lived in Houghton County. He held the world championship from 1895 to 1898 and was known as the Iron Mountain Butcher. He was arrested for robbing a train in 1893 and served 5 years. He was champion of America before going to jail.
- Frank Quinn was Cornish wrestling champion of the Pacific coast in 1892 and champion of Canada in 1903.
- Ole Marsh had a well known match in 1899 with John Sugget for a purse of $2k.
- John Sugget had a well known match in 1899 with Ole Marsh for a purse of $2k.
- Joseph Martin, originally from Castle Gate, Cornwall, was Cornish wrestling champion of Toronto in 1906.
- W Sampson, originally from Penzance, was Cornish wrestling champion of Toronto in 1907.

== Egypt ==
- Mustapha Hambdi was an Egyptian wrestler who competed in Cornish wrestling competitions in Britain in the 1920s. He was middleweight champion of the world in catch as catch can wrestling.

== Estonia ==
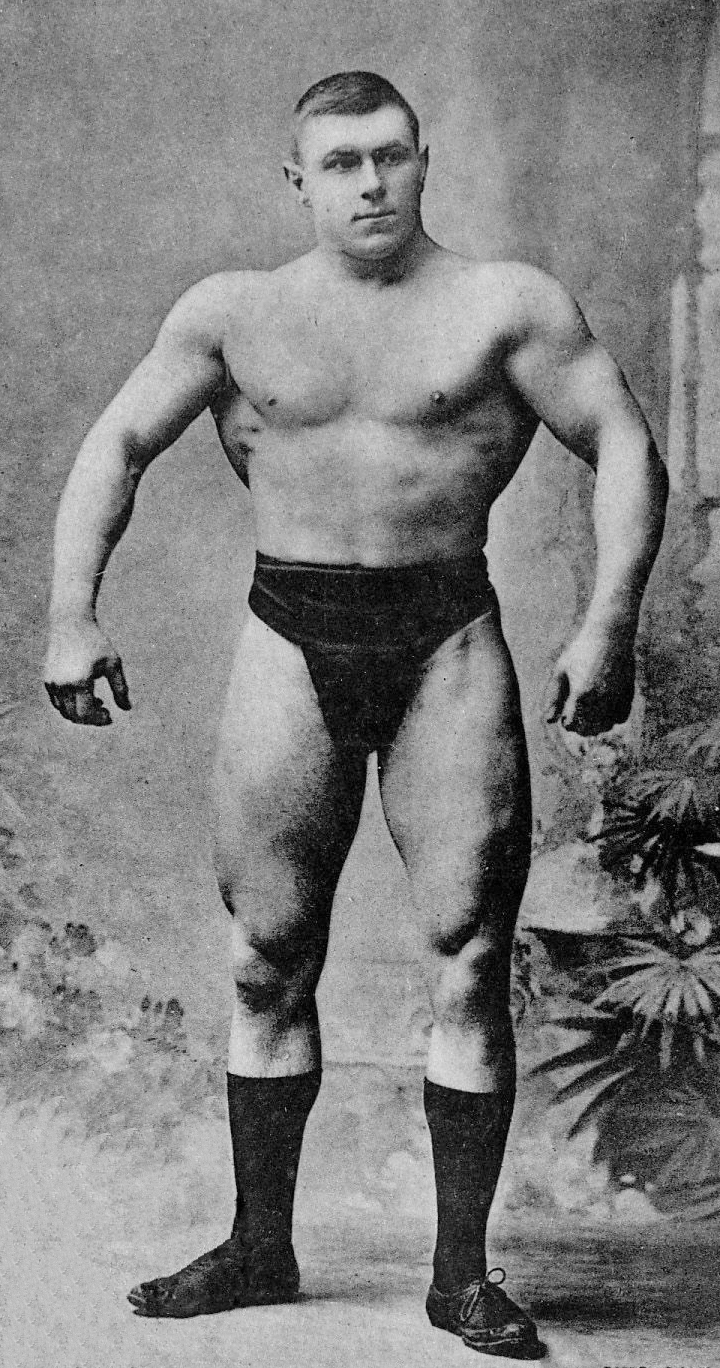
Georg Karl Julius Hackenschmidt 1905

- Georg Karl Julius Hackenschmidt (the "Russian lion" weighing over 25 st, or about 160 kg) defeated the Australian Cornish wrestling champion, Delhi Nelson (three times) and the South African Cornish wrestling champion Grotz, in 1905. Hackenschmidt was a champion of many wrestling styles.

== Finland ==
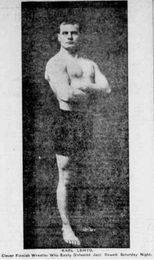
Karl Lehto 1910

- Karl Lehto, from Finland, competed in Cornish wrestling matches and tournaments in America in the early 1900s.
- Wirtanen, the "Mysterious Finn" claimed the championship of the world in Cornish wrestling in 1913.

== France ==
- Fleure was a champion French wrestler who competed in Cornish wrestling competitions in Britain at the highest level in the early to mid 1800s.
- Henri was a noted French wrestler in the mid-1800s.
- Piere Maison fought in Cornish wrestling matches in London in the mid-1800s.
- M Bazar lost to Sam Rundle, in Paris, in a Cornish wrestling match in 1876. He was wrestling champion of France at the time and weighed 300 lbs.
- Delmas Pierre was a Frenchman that fought in Cornish wrestling tournaments in America in the 1890s.
- Dubois was a French wrestler who weighed nearly 22 stone, who was beaten by Sam Rundle.

== Germany ==
- Herman was a German who competed in Cornish wrestling matches in Australia in the 1870s with some success.
- Carl Moth from Germany competed in mixed style wrestling matches in the US involving Cornish wrestling in the 1880s.
- Carl Schmidt, known as the "Germany Hercules", competed in mixed style wrestling matches in the US involving Cornish wrestling in the 1890s.
- Fisher was a German who competed in challenge matches in America involving Cornish wrestling. For example, he beat M J Dwyer in 1898, but lost the return match in the same year.
- Hillebrand, the "German Samson", was a strongman who toured America at the start of the 1900s and participated in some high-profile Cornish wrestling matches with the likes of Sid Varney.

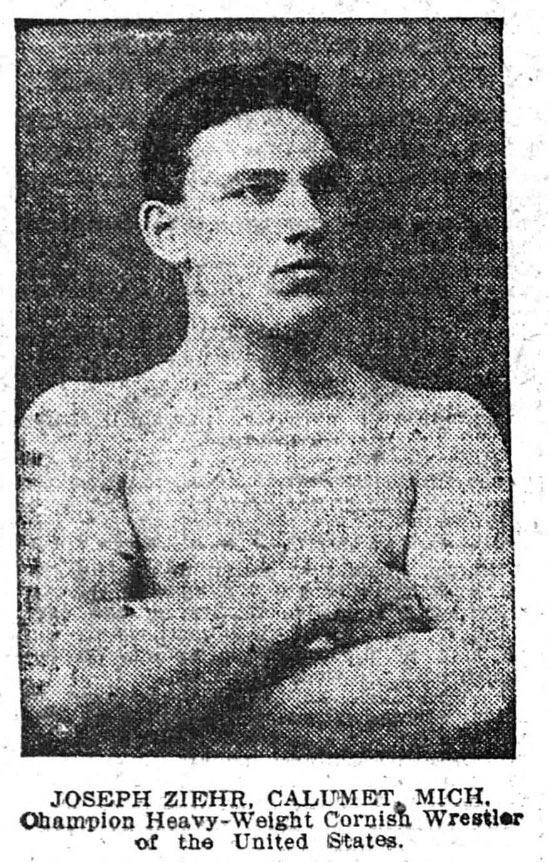
Joseph Ziehr 1902

- Frank Gehle, also known as the "German Hercules", fought in mixed style wrestling matches including Cornish wrestling, in the United States in the early 1900s.
- Joe Ziehr, from Germany, fought mostly in the United States and held the world Cornish wrestling heavyweight title between 1906 and 1919. In 1902 he was the heavyweight champion of the United States. Prior to this he had been a professional ice hockey player and played for the Calumet Miners.

== Greece ==
- Dr John Theodore Hatzopulos, known as "Greek George", was a champion wrestler of many styles including Cornish wrestling. He was 6 ft 2 inches high and weighed 188 lbs when in condition. He wrestled throughout the world.
- Bill Demetral was Greek, who fought in Cornish wrestling tournaments in Michigan in the early 1900s.

== Holland ==
- Dutcher was a wrestler of "some importance" from Holland that wrestled in Cornwall in the 1890s.

== Italy ==
- Charles Salotti was an Italian Cornish wrestler that fought in America in the early 1900s and won various tournaments.

== Japan ==
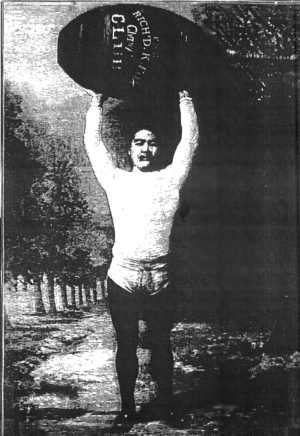
Matsuda Sorakichi

- Matsuda Sorakichi (1859–1891) competed in mixed style wrestling matches in the US, including Cornish wrestling, in the 1880s.
- Yukio Tani (1881–1950) was a famous Japanese ju-jitsu and judo wrestler who competed in Cornish wrestling competitions in Britain in the late 1920s.

== Mexico ==
- Don Pardo, originally from France and known as the "great Pardo", was a noted Mexican Cornish wrestler in the late 1800s. He was a world famed bicyclist
- Professor Willie, originally from San Francisco - 6 feet high and weighing 176 pounds, was a noted Mexican Cornish wrestler in the late 1800s.

== New Caledonia ==
- Philip Trenberth was the Cornish wrestling champion of New Caledonia in 1878.

== New Zealand ==
- Richard Cox was the Westland Cornish wrestling champion in 1868.
- Francis Griffiths (1844–1910) was the Cornish wrestling champion of the West coast of New Zealand for several years.
- Edward Blackburn (1844-?), born in Cumberland, 5 feet 7 inches high and weighing 182 lbs, had much success in New Zealand Cornish wrestling tournaments. He also competed successfully in Australia. He was originally a catch as catch can wrestling champion in England before emigrating. He drew a Cornish wrestling match with Sam Rundle in 1874.
- Thornton was the Cornish wrestling champion of New Zealand in 1882.
- Ben Orr was champion Cornish wrestler of New Zealand in 1887.
- Coghlan was champion wrestler of New Zealand in 1887.
- Robert James Scott, Cornish wrestling champion of New Zealand defeated Australian champion Delhi Nelson in 1905 to become the Cornish wrestling champion of Australasia. Note that he was arrested after this match for deserting his wife. He was 6 ft 3 inches and weighed over 14 stone.
- Harry Pearce was Cornish wrestling champion of Australasia in 1908.

== Poland ==
- J Rogers of Polish extraction fought in Cornish wrestling competitions in Australia in the 1890s.

== South Africa ==
- Bill Irwin (1855-?) was heavyweight champion of South Africa from 1897 before losing the title to Phil Mitchell in 1905. He also fought in Britain, for example losing a match to Jack Pearce.
- Phil Mitchell, born at East End, Redruth and weighing 197 lbs, was a famous heavyweight Cornish wrestling champion of South Africa. He was the heavyweight Cornish Wrestling champion of South Africa in 1904 and 1905.
- William Prynne (?-1931), Originally from St Stephen-in-Brannel and known as "Bill", was the Cornish wrestling champion of South Africa. He won 4 silver cups, a silver rose bowl and 2 cases of cutlery amongst other smaller prizes in South African tournaments.
- "Nick" Hocking, weighing 147 lbs, was the lightweight Cornish wrestling champion of South Africa in 1905.
- Grotz was Cornish wrestling champion of South Africa in 1905.
- Tit Wills, originally from Lanner and weighing 140 lbs, was the middleweight Cornish wrestling champion of South Africa in 1906.
- James Henry Triggs (1873-1949), weighing 220 lbs, born at Four Lanes and known as "Jim", was the heavyweight Cornish wrestling champion of South Africa in 1905 and 1906. He was champion of Australia in 1905 and won many matches in the US. He held the heavyweight title for Cornwall in 1904 and was instrumental in setting up the CWA. He was also a regular manager and stickler for the Cornish contingent in Brittany. He also wrestled in Norway.
- Almond Giles (1870–1912), weighing 125 lbs, was trained by Jack King and was the lightweight Cornish wrestling champion of South Africa, England and America in 1907. He was 1905 lightweight champion of South Africa. He was born in St Dennis, Cornwall. He won many tournaments in England and America. He was champion lightweight wrestler of Montana.
- Jack Rudd, weighing 152 lbs, was the middleweight Cornish wrestling champion of South Africa in 1905 and 1907. He was one of the best Cumberland wrestlers.
- Sam Ham (1880–1946), weighing 165 lbs, who was born in Condurrow near Camborne, was the 1910 middleweight Cornish wrestling champion of South Africa.
- W Littlejohn, originally from Gunnislake and weighing 220 lbs, known as 'tiny', was heavyweight champion of the Transvaal in 1910.
- William Charles Pearce (1978-?) won the Cornish wrestling championship of South Africa in Randfontein in 1912. He was nicknamed Bergie.
- Prynne Stevens, was the 1916 Cornish wrestling champion of South Africa.
- B Gregor was the heavyweight champion of South Africa in 1926.
- Cecil Coombes, originally from Redruth and weighing 197 lbs, regained the heavyweight title of South Africa in 1927, winning it for the fourth time.
- J Ocliffe was the lightweight champion of South Africa in 1927.
- T H Gregor (1894–1964) originally from Highway, Redruth arrived in South Africa in 1913 and won many Cornish wrestling trophies in South Africa. In 1953 he was still the undefeated heavyweight Cornish wrestling champion of South Africa.

== Sri Lanka ==
- The Imajah was middleweight champion of Ceylon in 1894 and also competed in Cornwall.

== Sweden ==
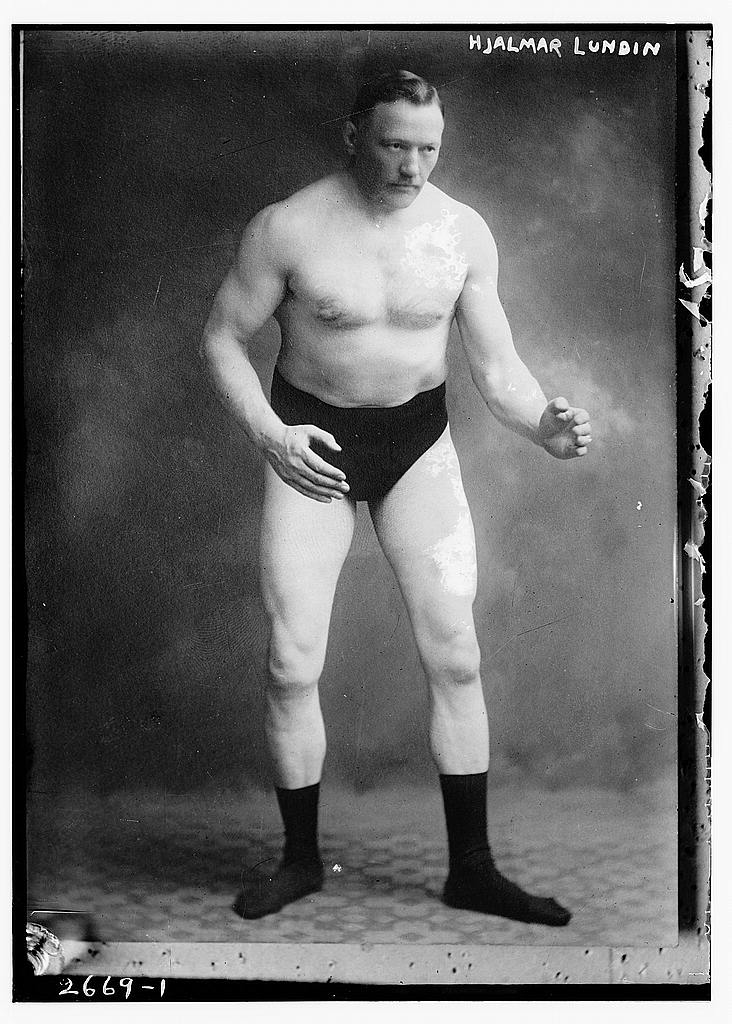
Hjalmar Lundin

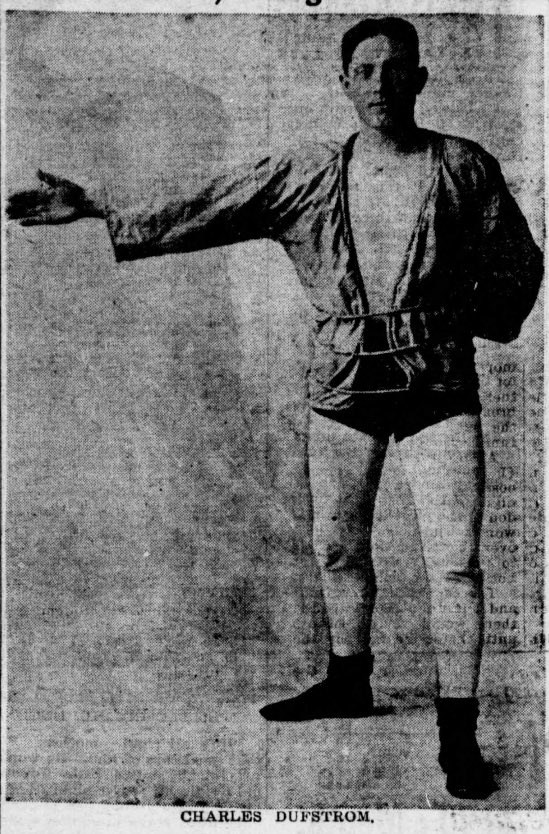
Charles Dufstrom 1912

- Hjalmar Emanuel Lundin (1870–1941) fought in mixed style challenge matches in the United States, in the late 1890s, including Cornish wrestling.
- Emil Anderson, known as the "terrible Swede", Sweden fought in the United States at the turn of the 20th century. He had a famous match, for the world title, with Rowett in 1899.
- Karl Johnson (1883–1952), born in Grästorp and also known as the "Terrible Swede", fought in the United States, based in Chicago, in challenge matches, including Cornish wrestling.
- Ole Olson from Sweden, was one of the best Cornish wrestlers in the US. He beat John Tippett in a well known match in 1904.
- Chris Person, known as the "Big Swede", competed in Cornish wrestling tournaments in the US, in the early 1900s.
- Charles Dufstrom, also known as the "terrible Swede", fought in the United States and claimed the world Cornish wrestling title in 1912.

== Turkey ==
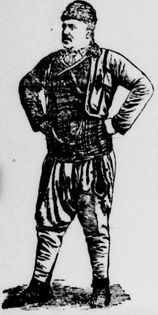
Hali Adali 1899

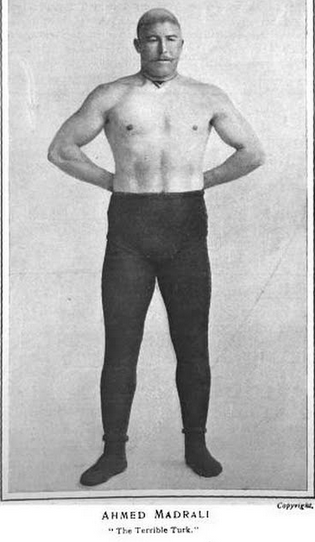
Ahmed Madrali 1904

- Hali Adali, the great Turkish wrestler weighing 263 lbs and with a 56-inch chest, had some success in Cornish wrestling at the turn of the 20th century including defeating Tom Harrington, Joe Ziehr and Jack O 'Neill in 1899. However, he was defeated in a Cornish wrestling match by Jack O'Neill during a visit to the United States in 1903.
- Mourad Alat, known as the "Terrible Turk No II", fought in challenge matches in multiple styles, including Cornish wrestling, in Canada in the early 1900s.
- Ahmed Madrali, the famous Greco-Roman wrestler known as the "Terrible Turk", tried his hand at Cornish wrestling and was defeated by Earnest Small.

== United States ==
- Joseph Taylor Williams (1830-?) was born in St Erth and fought in tournaments in Cornwall, Devon and California during the 1850s and 1860s. "He had not an equal in his day at anywhere near his weight." He was champion of the Pacific coast. He was known as "little" Joe Williams or "Shiers" Williams. He was also lightweight champion of Cornwall in 1873. He repeatedly beat Sam Rundle in the 1870s.
- Thomas Eudy (born in St Austell) was the California State Cornish wrestling champion in 1861.
- Joseph Lawrence came second in the Grass valley tournament in 1866. He was convicted of second degree murder in 1868.
- Bill Pellew (1838–1908), from Virginia City, Nevada, was a miner and known as the "Pride of Comstock". He was Cornish wrestling champion of America in the 1870s.
- George Harvey (1843-?) was the Michigan Cornish wrestling champion in the 1870s. He was 5 feet 11 inches high and weighed 195 lbs.
- Colonel J H McLaughlin (1844–1905), participated in mixed style wrestling matches, including Cornish wrestling, at the end of the 1800s.
- James H Williams (1845–1906) from Walkerville, Michigan, and better known as "Belmont", was famous as a Cornish wrestler.
- William Alfred Williams (1850–1903) from Centreville, Michigan, held the middleweight Cornish wrestling champion of the Pacific coast for years.
- Fred Beecham was champion of Michigan in 1870.
- James Delbridge (1851-?) was the Michigan lightweight Cornish wrestling champion in the 1870s. He was 5 feet 7 inches high and weighed 145 lbs.
- Tom Carkeek, born in Plain-an-Gwarry, Redruth was said to weigh 17 stone, was a champion of Cornish wrestling in the 1860s and was the world Cornish wrestling champion in 1875. It was said that he won 528 consecutive wrestling matches without defeat and won 88 prizes. He was champion of the Lakes in 1878. He worked as a miner in Montana.
- John Blydh (1854-?) born in Linkinhorne and weighing 186 lbs, beat Tom Carkeek in a celebrated match in 1878.
- James Gerry (1858-?) born in Linkinhorne, weighing 180 lbs and being 5 feet 11 inches high, beat the best men of America including Tom Carkeek. He also had some success in Cornwall, drawing a match with Sam Rundle.
- Ben Knight, from Darlington, held the Cornish wrestling championship belts for Wisconsin, Northern Michigan and Colorado during the 1880s.
- Johnny Smith, from Virginia City, claimed to be the Pacific coast Cornish Wrestling champion in 1884.
- James Pascoe (1852-?) claimed to be the Pacific coast Cornish Wrestling champion in 1884 and 1890. In 1990 he claimed the title of champion of America in the Cornish style. He was 5 styles wrestling champion of the world.
- Peter Carlyon (1846–1926), from Breage, was the world lightweight Cornish wrestling champion in 1876, having defeated Tom Carkeek. In 1886 and 1887 he was the lightweight champion of America. He also came to compete in the UK.
- Durham Ivey (1854–1894) was the Colorado Cornish wrestling champion in 1886. He died in a mine accident and was also a catch-as-catch-can wrestler.
- Richard Varcoe (1855–1910) was a Cornish wrestler with some success, that wat was murdered by James Scopacesa in Ishpeming, Michigan. His son John was also a "clever wrestler".
- Andrew Bearle was the Cornish wrestling champion of America in 1887.
- Captain James M Wilcox from Ontonagon, Michigan, was the middle weight Cornish wrestling champion and was one of the world's authorities on Cornish wrestling. He was a wealthy mine owner who became the elected representative for the district of Gogebic County, Michigan. He stated that he would introduce a bill to make the teaching of Cornish wrestling compulsory in Michigan schools.
- Gus Stuhl was champion of Montana and won a $5k prize to become champion of the West in 1890.
- Frank Joslin was the Pacific coast Cornish Wrestling champion in 1894.
- Joseph Jefford was the Pacific coast Cornish Wrestling champion in 1895.
- J W Jefford of Sonoma was the Pacific coast Cornish Wrestling champion in 1898.
- Louis Morgan was the champion Cornish wrestler of the North West in 1898. In 1899 he was champion lightweight Cornish wrestler of the world.
- "Jim" Jeffords of Grass valley was the Cornish wrestling champion of America in 1899. He was considered one of the best Cornish wrestlers in America before he became a boxer.

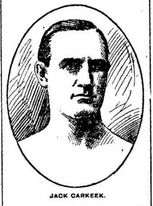
Jack Carkeek 1900

- John Carkeek (1861–1924), known as "Jack", was the World Cornish Wrestling champion in 1886 (after beating Jack Pearce in a bout lasting over 5 hours), in 1887 (he separately fought Pearce where the outcome was contested and Pearce claimed that Carkeek bit off a portion of his ear, Bragg but drew with Hancock in a title match) and again in 1889 (beating Hancock and Pearce) through to 1901, 1904 (beating Tom Bragg) and 1905. He regularly wrestled in Britain and the USA. He also wrestled in Australia. He was born in Rockland, Michigan, died in Havana and was buried in New York. He also won the Pacific coast championship. He officially retired from wrestling in 1891, however was involved in competitions after this date. He was the son of Tom Carkeek and his mother was first cousin to the actor Sir Henry Irving. He was the champion of America in 1887, 1888 and 1900. In the US, he was originally trained by Thomas White from St Just. In 1888 he was arrested in Chicago for two counts of swindling by means of a fake contests. In 1910, while using the name of Jack Fletcher, he was arrested in San Francisco as part of the Maybray gang involved with match fixing. In 1913 he pleaded guilty to attempted swindling and was sentenced to 6 months. He also fought under the name Jack O'Brien.
- Robert Gilbert, from Anaconda, Montana, was a heavyweight champion Cornish wrestler. In 1891 he was heavyweight Cornish wrestling champion of both Colorado and Montana.

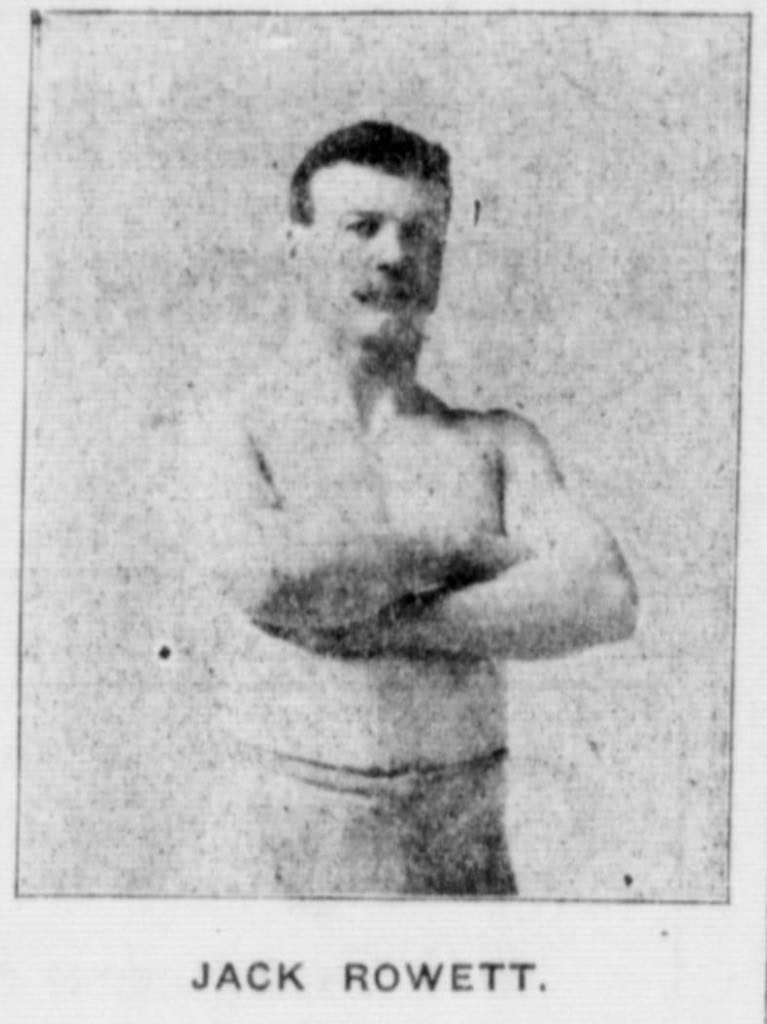
Jack Rowett 1909

- John Ryan (1868–1937), born in Wabasha, Minnesota, held the World's middleweight championship in Cornish wrestling. He was deputy sheriff of Gogebic county and then managed a bar before joining the Oliver Iron police force.
- John H Rowett (1873-1958), born in St Austell, was known as Jack and the "Bessemer Giant" and gained the lightweight championship of the United States at the age of 16. He won the world championship in 1896 from Jack King and defended the title until his retirement in 1911. Rowett regained his title in 1914 and 1915. He was champion of America in 1897, 1898, 1899 and 1909. He was a game warden and then was elected one of Gogebic county's early sheriffs.
- William Jones, from Butte, Montana, beat Jack Rowett twice in large stand alone matches in 1899, thereby claiming the championship of the world. Note that he had lost to Rowett in 1897.

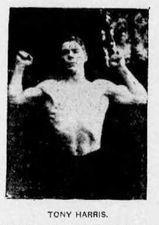
Tony Harris 1902

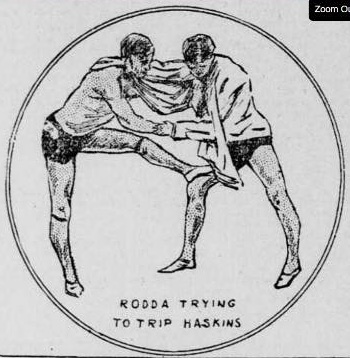
James Rodda wrestling Haskins in San Francisco 1898

- James Rodda was champion of California in the Cornish style from 1889 through to 1902. He was arrested on a charge of attempted murder after a gunfight with Robert Chase in 1902.
- Tony Harris was a USA Cornish wrestling Champion in the 1900s (coming from Butte, Montana), of which it was claimed that he was "the best man to ever wear a [wrestling] jacket". He was champion of the North West in 1896, 1902 and 1903.
- Prof Mike J Dwyer, from Hancock, Michigan and known as "Sonny" Dwyer, claimed the world Cornish wrestling title in 1898 and 1902. He had the distinction of teaching Cornish wrestling to the US president, Theodore Roosevelt. He was champion of Canada in 1900.

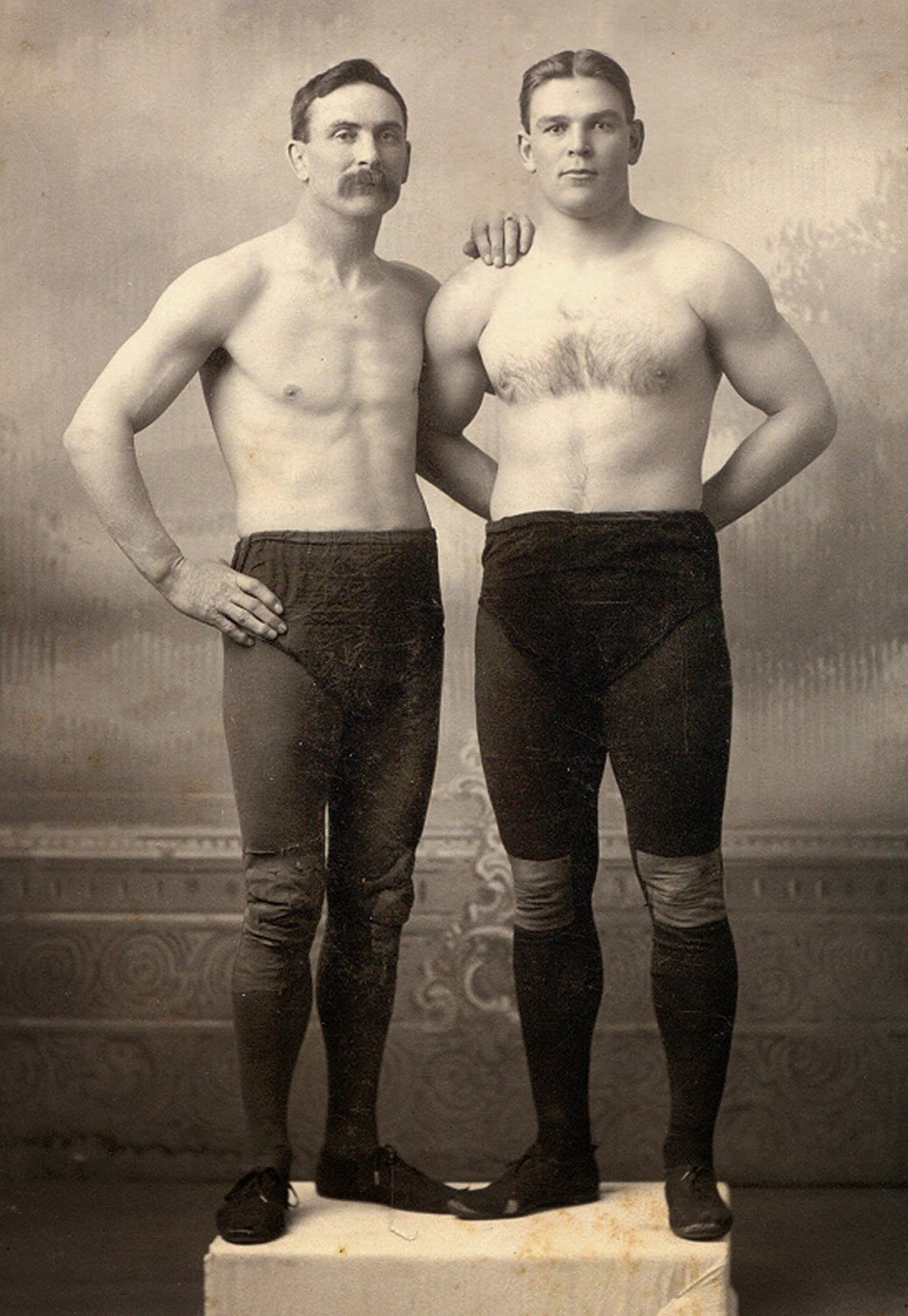
Martin Burns (left) and Frank Gotch (right)

- Martin Burns (1861–1937), born in Cedar County and known as "Farmer" Burns, beat Rowett in 1899 and lost to M J Dwyer in 1905 in Cornish wrestling matches. He was a famous catch wrestler.
- Frank Gotch (1877–1917) beat Jack Carkeek in a Cornish wrestling match, while Jack claimed to have the world Cornish wrestling title. Gotch was a champion of many wrestling styles.
- Jack O'Neill, beat Jack Carkeek and Hali Adali in the very early 1900s.
- Husson, was the Cornish wrestling champion of Arizona in 1904.
- Coon, was the Cornish wrestling champion of Arizona in 1904, after beating Husson in their return match.
- Fred Roeber was champion of America in 1907.
- John Tippett (1876–1910), known as Jack, lived in Butte, Montana, but was originally from St Austell and weighed 186 lbs. He was champion of Canada and Michigan. He claimed to be Cornish wrestling champion of America in 1908. He also had some wrestling success in Cornwall. He died in a cabin fire in Park City.

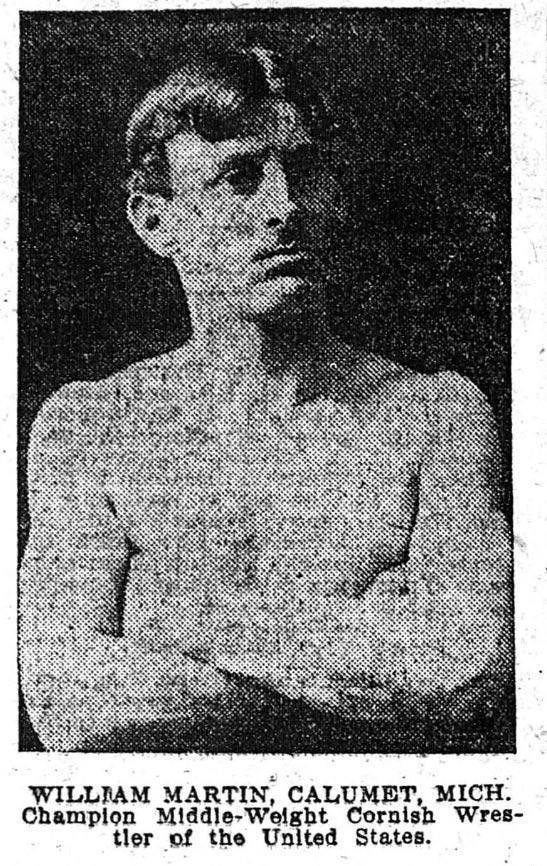
William Martin 1902

- William Martin (1875-1910), 'Billy' weighing 140 lbs, from Calumet, Michigan, was the lightweight world Cornish wrestling champion from 1898 until he died of pneumonia in 1910. In 1902 he was the middleweight champion of the United States. He also wrestled in Norway. In 1905 he was champion lightweight Cornish wrestler of Michigan.
- Mike Dooley claimed the title of champion lightweight Cornish wrestler of the world in 1909. He was the welter weight Cornish style wrestling champion of the Northwest in 1910.
- K A Wirtenan won the world's championship in Cornish wrestling in 1910.
- John Rowe was Sheriff of Gogebic County, City Marshal of Bessemer and in 1910 was the undefeated world champion of Cornish-style wrestling.
- Thomas Young was the 1911 Cornish wrestling champion of Arizona.
- Chief War Eagle was of Native American extraction and competed in mixed wrestling challenge matches, involving Cornish wrestling, in the US in the early 1900s. In such a match he beat Tim Harrington in 1911.
- Sid R Varney, born in Cleveland, claimed the world Cornish wrestling title in 1921. He fought Ahmed Madrali in 1898 and 1899. He was a blacksmith and a champion in other wrestling styles.
- Richard Johns, known as "Dick", from Gwinn was the lightweight Cornish wrestling champion of the world in 1921. He was lightweight champion of the US in 1921 and in 1923.
- Tom Richards, originally from Old Pound, Nanpean, was the 1926 middleweight champion of America.

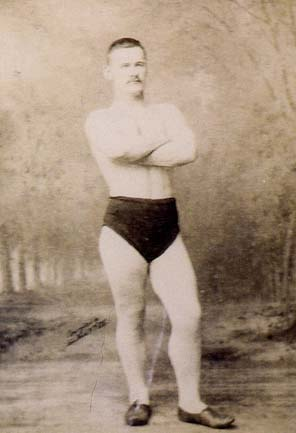
Evan Lewis 1919
