= Kent Island (disambiguation) =

Kent Island is an island in Chesapeake Bay, in the U.S. state of Maryland.

Kent Island may also refer to:

== Islands ==
- Kent Island (California) in Marin County
- Kent Island, New Brunswick, in Canada
- Kent Island (Queensland), in Australia
- Kent Island (Chile), in Aysén Region

== Other uses ==
- Kent Island Research Facility, a U.S. National Security Agency facility in Maryland
- Ships named USS Kent Island, including:
  - USS Kent Island (AG-78), a Liberty ship
  - USS Kent Island (AKS-26), a Liberty ship

== See also ==
- Kent (disambiguation)
