= Kentish =

Kentish may be used as a name:

- Kentish Council is a local government area in Tasmania, Australia
- Kentish Town is an area of north west London, England
- English ship Kentish

Kentish as a surname:

- John Kentish (minister), 1768–1853
- John Kentish (tenor), 1910–2006, English opera singer

Kentish may also be an adjective for things relating to the English county of Kent or the former Kingdom of Kent:

- Kentish dialect, a 19th-century dialect of Modern English
- Kentish dialect (Old English), a dialect of Old English
- Kentish Man or Maid
- Old Kentish Carol, a traditional Christmas carol from Kent

== See also ==
- Kent (disambiguation)
- Kentish plover
