= Kemps =

Kemps may refer to:

- Kemps (card game), a card game with many different names where the player must silently signal a partner to score points
- Kemps (company), a food company based in St. Paul, Minnesota
