= Cent =

Cent may refer to:

== Currency ==
- Cent (currency), a one-hundredth subdivision of several units of currency
- Penny (Canadian coin), a Canadian coin removed from circulation in 2013
- 1 cent (Dutch coin), a Dutch coin minted between 1941 and 1944
- 1 cent euro coin, a European coin
- Penny (United States coin), a United States coin

== Locations ==
- Cents, Luxembourg, a quarter of Luxembourg City, Luxembourg
- Cent, the Old English term for modern-day Kent, England

== Measurement ==
- Cent (music), a logarithmic measure of relative pitch or intervals
- "Cent" is an informal name for 1/100 of a unit of measurement, as in "12 cents of an inch". Specifically, it can refer to:

- an alternative name for the point, a unit of mass for gemstones equal to 1/100 of a carat
- Cent (area), a unit of land area equal to 1/100 of an acre (used in the Indian states of Kerala and Tamil Nadu); also known as the decimal (unit) in West Bengal and Bangladesh
- a unit of nuclear reactivity, which is 1/100 of a Dollar (reactivity)

== See also ==
- 50 Cent
- Century, 100 consecutive years
- Percent, 1 in 100
- Cent sign
- Kent (disambiguation)
- Penny (disambiguation)
