= English ship Kentish =

One ship of the Royal Navy has borne the name Kentish, while the name Kentish was also borne by a warship of the Commonwealth of England's navy; the name was a variation on the English county of Kent:

- English ship Kentish (1646) was an armed merchantman purchased in 1646 and listed until 1647.
- Kentish was a 46-gun frigate launched in 1652. She was renamed HMS Kent in 1660, and was wrecked in 1672.

== See also ==
- Kentish (disambiguation)
- HMS Kent
