= Richard Parkyn =

Personal information
- Nickname: The Great Parkyn
- Born: 1774; Parkyn's Shop
- Died: May 28, 1855 (aged 80–81); Cornwall, England
- Height: 6 ft 0 in (183 cm)
- Weight: 235 lb (107 kg)

Richard Parkyn (c. 1772 – May 28, 1855) was a champion Cornish wrestler. He was born at Parkyn's Shop which lies at three parish boundaries, St Columb Major, St Columb Minor and St Mawgan. There was a saying at the time that Parkyn was "So great that all three parishes claimed him". He was also known as The Great Parkyn. Little is recorded about his life other than newspaper reports of his fights. "Parkyn, a friend of the Cornish hero James Polkinghorne died at Parkyn Shop where he and his ancestors resided during 170 years on 28 May 1855, aged 81 years."

== Physique ==
According to the Sporting Magazine... "His head, a little bald on the crown, but otherwise well covered with fine bushy black hair, curling a little on his broad brawny shoulders, and his erect honest bold front and firm step, were worth travelling a hundred miles to behold. He stands six feet high, and weighs two hundred and thirty-two pounds, although as lean as a post-horse."

Thomas King Chambers wrote of comparing him to a bronze statue of Hercules. The nearest approach to it which I have heard of, as attained by muscular development without awkward and inconvenient obesity, is in the instance of Parkins {sic], the famous Cornish wrestler, whose ordinary weight in his clothes was sixteen stone, eleven pounds, his height being six feet.

His physique was astounding if compared to a modern equivalent such as Arnold Schwarzenegger who was 6 feet 2 inches and weighed two hundred and thirty-five pounds.

== Famous bout with Jordan of Devon ==
WRESTLING. Saltash diversions, Cornwall, ended on Saturday, the 27th where the amateurs of wrestling were highly gratified by seeing the two great Devonshire players, Jordan and Wadling, play against two Cornish men, Parkin and Jolly, who came from St. Columb, purposely to play with them, in consequence of its being erroneously inserted in some of the newspapers that Jordan alone threw at Torpoint fair, fifteen of the best players in Cornwall. We understand these two great champions of Devonshire were both put on their backs in less than two minutes, by Parkyn and Jolly, who were declared, without the least dispute, to be the victors, and had the first and second prizes given them, and Cowling, another Cornish player, won the third prize. The Cornish gentlemen offered on the ground (in answer to a bet offered at Crediton,) to get ten Cornish men who should play against the same number of Devonshire men for any sum, from one hundred to a thousand pounds.
