= Fort Kent =

Fort Kent may refer to:

- Fort Kent, Alberta, Canada, a hamlet
- Fort Kent, Maine, US, a town
  - Fort Kent (CDP), Maine, the main village in the town
  - Fort Kent (fort), a historic site in the town
