= HMS Kent =

Eleven ships of the British Royal Navy have been named HMS Kent, after the county of Kent and the Duke of Kent.

- HMS Kent (1660) was a 46-gun fourth rate launched in 1652 as the Kentish, renamed Kent in 1660, and wrecked in 1672.
- HMS Kent (1679) was a 70-gun third rate launched in 1679, rebuilt in 1699 and 1724, and broken up in 1744.
- HMS Kent (1746) was a 70-gun third rate launched in 1746 and hulked in 1760.
- HMS Kent (1762) was a 74-gun third rate launched in 1762 and sold in 1784.
- HMS Kent (1798) was a 74-gun third rate launched in 1798, converted to a sheer hulk in 1856, and broken up in 1881.
- HMS Kent (1798) was a 16-gun gunvessel purchased in 1798 and sold in 1801.
- HMS Kent was to have been a 91-gun second rate. She was laid down in 1860 but was cancelled in 1863.
- HMS Kent was originally the 98-gun second rate Impregnable. She was renamed HMS Kent in 1888 and then HMS Caledonia in 1891, before being broken up in 1906.
- HMS Kent (1901) was a Monmouth-class armoured cruiser launched in 1901 and sold in 1920.
- HMS Kent (54) was a County-class heavy cruiser launched in 1926 and sold in 1948.
- HMS Kent (D12) was a County-class guided missile destroyer launched in 1961 and sold in 1997 for breaking up.
- HMS Kent (F78) is a Type 23 frigate launched in 1998 and currently in service.

== Battle honours ==
- 1653 Portland^{1}
- 1654 Gabbard^{1}
- 1655 Porto Farina
- 1665 Lowestoft
- 1666 Orfordness
- 1692 Barfleur
- 1702 Vigo
- 1703 Velez Malaga
- 1718 Cape Passero
- 1747 Ushant
- 1801 Egypt
- 1914 Falkland Islands
- 1940 Atlantic
- 1940 Mediterranean
- 1942 - 43 Arctic
- 1944 Norway

1: As the Kentish Frigate

== See also ==
- HMS Kentish
- HMS Kentville
- HMS Duke of Kent
- Hired armed cutter Kent
- Kent (East Indiaman)
