= Abraham Cann =

Wrestler from Devon

Portrait of Abraham Cann attributed to Henry Caunter, c. 1850, Royal Albert Memorial Museum, Exeter

Abraham Cann (1794 – 7 April 1864) was an English wrestler of the 19th century.

== Life ==
Cann was the son of Robert Cann, a farmer and a wrestler in Devon, and his wife, Mary. He was born at Eastcombe Head farm and was baptised at Colebrooke, near Crediton, on 2 December 1794. Inheriting from his father a love of play, he defeated John Jordan, Flower, Wreyford, Simon Webber, and the other good wrestlers in Devon, and carried off the prizes at all the places where he became a competitor. In these matches, he wrestled in the Devonshire fashion, namely, wearing shoes and endeavouring to disable his adversary by violently kicking him on the legs.

=== Cann's match with Warren ===
On 21 September 1826, at the Eagle Tavern in City Road, London, he contended without shoes for the first prize with James Warren of Redruth (who was conspicuous for his bravery at the time of the loss of the Kent, Indiaman, in 1825), and although the latter made a gallant struggle, Cann was declared the victor.

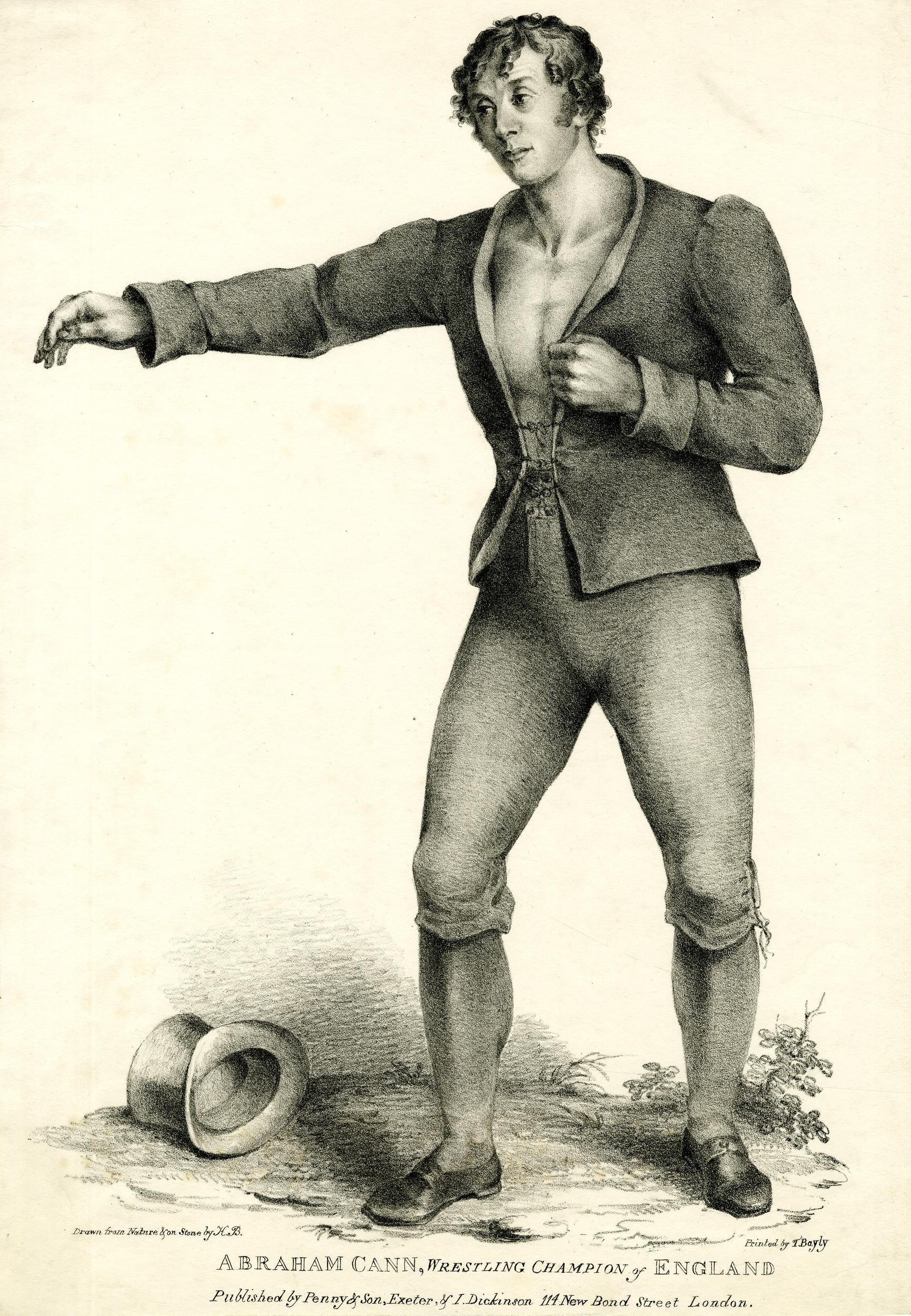
Print of Abraham Cann, Wrestling Champion of England

=== Cann's match with Polkinghorne ===
Cann had long been known as the champion of Devon when he challenged James Polkinghorne, the champion of Cornwall. Polkinghorne was 6 feet, 2 inches tall, weighed 320 lbs, and had not wrestled for some years, being the landlord of the Red Lion inn at St Columb Major, Cornwall. Cann was but 5 feet, 8½ inches in height, and weighed 175 lbs. This match, the purse for which was £200 a side for the best of three back falls, took place at Tamar Green, Morice Town, near Devonport, on 23 October 1826, in the presence of upwards of 12,000 spectators. After a long struggle, the Cornishman won a fair back fall. Cann then threw Polkinghorne, but a dispute arose, and a toss gave it in favour of the latter. After several other falls, Polkinghorne threw Cann, but the triers were divided in opinion as to the fall. Polkinghorne left the ring, and after much wrangling, the match was declared to be drawn. The Devon man, using the toes and heels of his shoes, kicked his adversary in the most frightful manner, while the Cornishman neither wore shoes nor kicked.Cann was a fighter of the Devon style, a "kicker"; he wore boots with toes that had been soaked in bullock's blood and then baked as "hard as flint". Polkinghorne fought in the Cornish style and was a "hugger" who fought without footwear. The fight is remembered by a plaque on the Red Lion pub in St Columb Major. Cann would fight any man in England for £500.

=== Retirement and death ===
In 1861, Lord Palmerston headed a subscription among the West Country gentlemen, by which the sum of £200 was presented to the former champion of Devonshire. Cann was for many years the proprietor of an inn. He died in his native place, Colebrooke, on 7 April 1864, and is buried in Colebrooke churchyard. He had four older brothers, George, Robert, James and William, all of whom were wrestlers. Messrs. Sparkes & Pope, solicitors, of Crediton, were said, at the end of the nineteenth century, to have possessed a manuscripted biography of Cann.
