= Hjalmar Lundin =

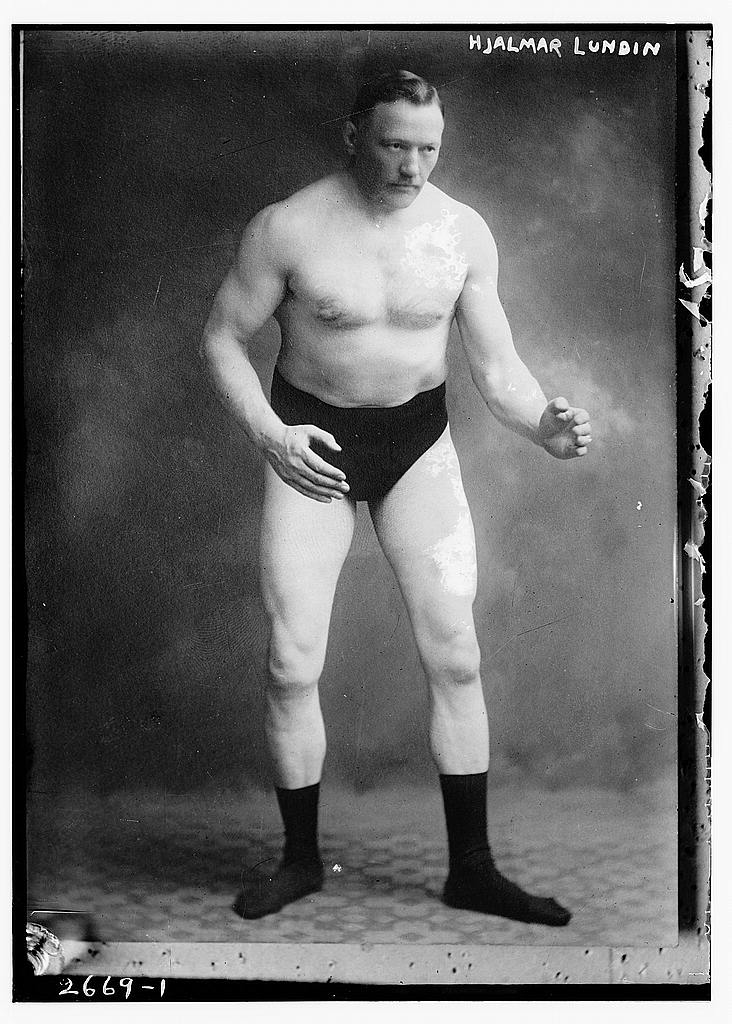
Hjalmar Lundin circa 1913

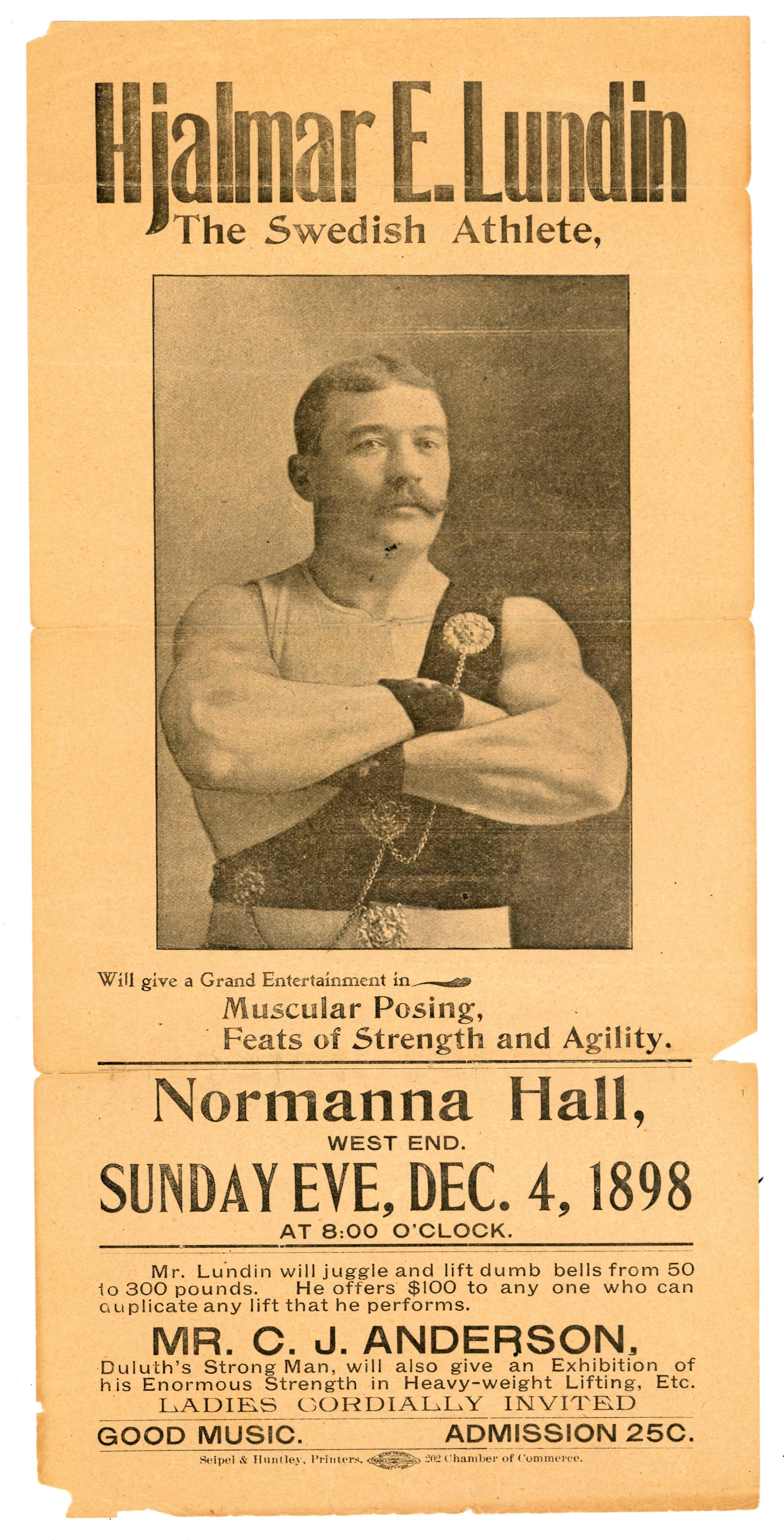
Broadside of Hjalmar Lundin dated December 4, 1898 promoting his athletic prowess, strengths and agility. Hjalmar Lundin offers anyone $100.00 if they can duplicate any lifting performed that night. Mr. C.J. Anderson of Duluth will perform following Mr. Lundin. Scan of the original as printed by Seipel & Huntley Printing of Duluth, Minnesota.

Hjalmar Emanuel Lundin (1870–1941) was a Swedish wrestler and strongman who was for many years the undefeated champion of New York City.

== Biography ==
Lundin was born on 22 September 1870 in Husby-Sjuhundra in the Roslagen area of Sweden. He was one of his country's wrestling pioneers. He later moved to the United States where he started out as a professional "giant" in Ringling Brothers circus. Despite his size, Lundin was regarded as a clean and speedy wrestler. On January 21, 1908, Lundin was defeated by World Champion Frank Gotch in Lowell, Massachusetts. In January 1910 Mitsuyo Maeda and Hjalmar Lundin took part in a wrestling tournament in Mexico City.

Lundin fought in mixed style challenge matches in the United States, including Cornish wrestling in the late 1890s including a match against John Rowett in 1899, who was the world Cornish wrestling champion.

== Publication ==
- On the Mat-and Off: Memoirs of a Wrestler (1937)
