= USS Kent Island =

Cargo ship of the United States Navy

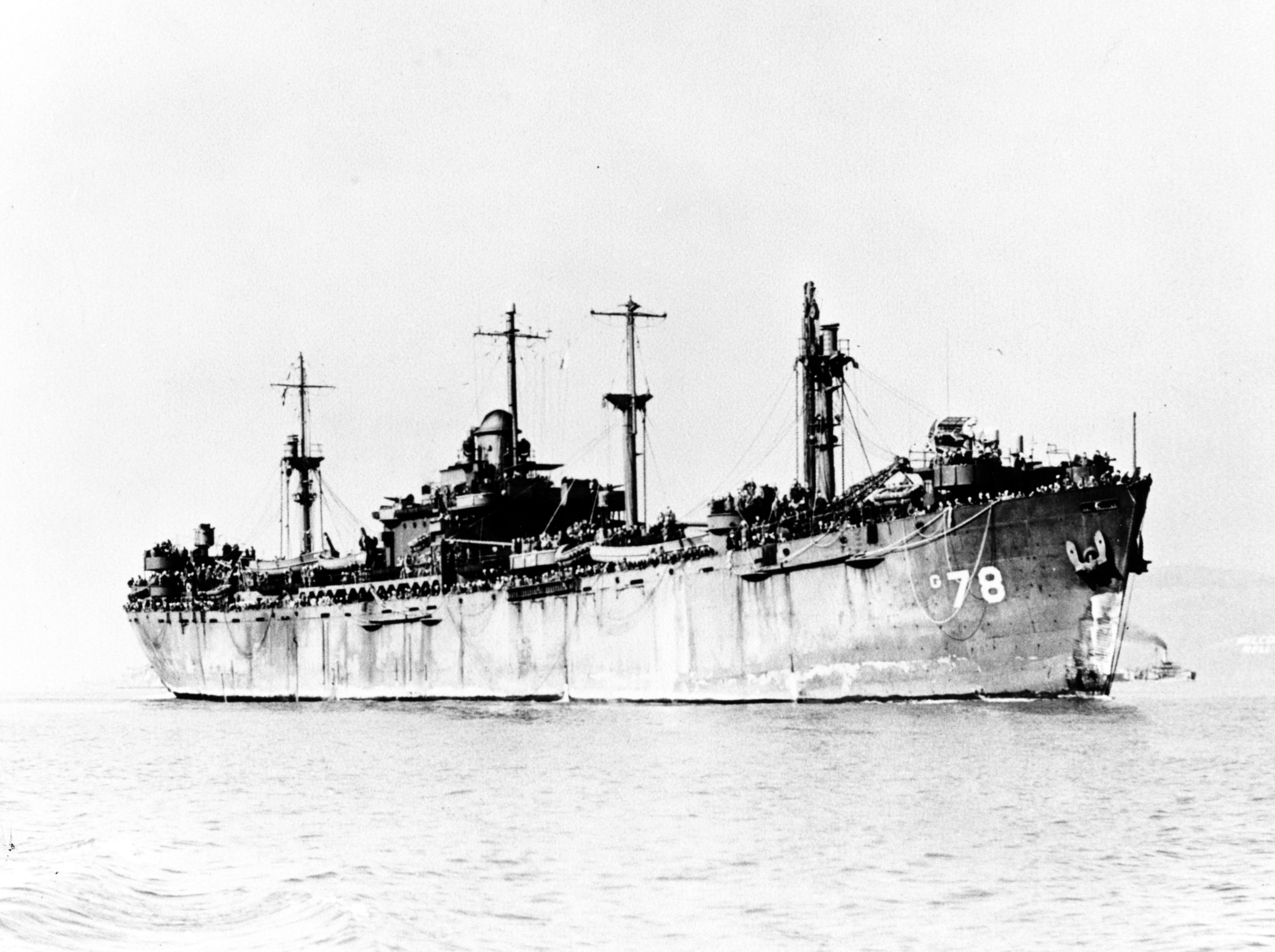
- Kent Island, circa in December 1945

History

United States
- Name: Kent Island
- Namesake: Kent Island
- Builder: New England Shipbuilding Corporation, South Portland, Maine
- Laid down: 19 November 1944 as type (EC2-S-C1) hull, (MCE hull 3092)
- Launched: 9 January 1945
- Sponsored by: Mrs. Nan Hatch
- Acquired: by the Navy 19 January 1945
- Commissioned: 1 August 1945 as USS Kent Island (AG-78)
- Decommissioned: 22 June 1946, at Orange, Texas
- In service: 19 January 1945 as USS Kent Island
- Out of service: 23 January 1945
- Reclassified: AKS-26, 18 August 1951
- Refit: Todd Shipbuilding Company, Hoboken, New Jersey
- Stricken: 1 April 1960
- Fate: scrapped, 2 November 1960

General characteristics
- Type: Basilan-class miscellaneous auxiliary
- Displacement: 5,766 tons light; 14,200 tons full load
- Length: 441 ft 6 in (134.57 m)
- Beam: 56 ft 11 in (17.35 m)
- Draft: 23 ft (7.0 m)
- Propulsion: reciprocating steam engine, single shaft, 1,950hp
- Speed: 12.5 knots
- Complement: 883 officers and enlisted
- Armament: one single 5 in (130 mm)/38 dual purpose gun mount, twelve 20 mm single AA gun mounts

USS Kent Island (AG-78/AKS-26) was a Basilan-class miscellaneous auxiliary acquired by the U.S. Navy shortly before the end of World War II. She was used to transport personnel and cargo and was inactivated and disposed of shortly after the war.

== Constructed at Portland, Maine ==
Kent Island (AG-78) was launched 9 January 1945 by New England Shipbuilding Corporation, South Portland, Maine, under a U.S. Maritime Commission contract; sponsored by Mrs. Nan Hatch; transferred to the Navy 19 January 1945; commissioned the same day, ferried to Todd Shipbuilding Company, Hoboken, New Jersey; decommissioned 23 January 1945 for conversion to a barracks and issue ship; and recommissioned 1 August 1945.

== World War II-related service ==
After shakedown in the Chesapeake Bay, Kent Island cleared Norfolk, Virginia, 31 August for duty with the Service Force Pacific Fleet. She arrived Pearl Harbor 9 October via San Diego, California, to commence operations in Hawaiian waters.

She sailed for Okinawa 17 October to receive Navy veterans for transportation to the United States, and returned San Francisco, California, 30 November. Kent Island cleared San Francisco 3 January 1946, transited the Panama Canal, and arrived Hampton Roads 26 January.

== Inactivation ==
Following upkeep, she put into Orange, Texas, 15 March where she was placed out of commission in reserve 22 June 1946. She was redesignated AKS-26 on 18 August 1951 and struck from the Navy List 1 April 1960. Kent Island was sold to Southern Scrap Material Co. 2 November 1960 to be scrapped.
