= Kent Township =

Kent Township may refer to the following townships in the United States:

- Kent Township, Warren County, Indiana
- Kent Township, Stephenson County, Illinois
