= Kent Street =

Kent Street may refer to:

- Kent Street (Ottawa), Canada
- Kent Street, Perth, Australia
  - Kent Street Senior High School, a school in Perth, Australia
- Kent Street, Sydney
- Kent Street, East Sussex, England
- Kent Street (Simcoe, Ontario), Canada
- Kent Street station, Brookline, Massachusetts
- Former name for the Old Kent Road, London, England
