= Kent Island Research Facility =

U.S. National Security Agency facility in Maryland

Coordinates: 38.964°N 76.286°W

The Kent Island Research Facility is a U.S. National Security Agency facility located on Kent Island, Maryland, near the town of Chester.

== History ==
The facility was established in 1961 to conduct research on very high frequency and microwave antenna systems—specifically, on problems associated with anomalous propagation in communications interception. According to James Bamford in 1983, the location consists of the NSA Propagation Research Laboratory, a single-story, white, windowless building that houses automatically operating, unattended equipment, as well as a small, white cinder-block "control" building surrounded in a barbed-wire fence. Near the control building are a number of unusual antennas.

In 2016, the United States government shuttered various Russian diplomat vacation facilities, including one that, according to Australian security expert Des Ball, was well positioned to spy on the NSA’s "Propagation and Research Laboratory" on Kent Island.
