= Kemps (card game) =

Card game

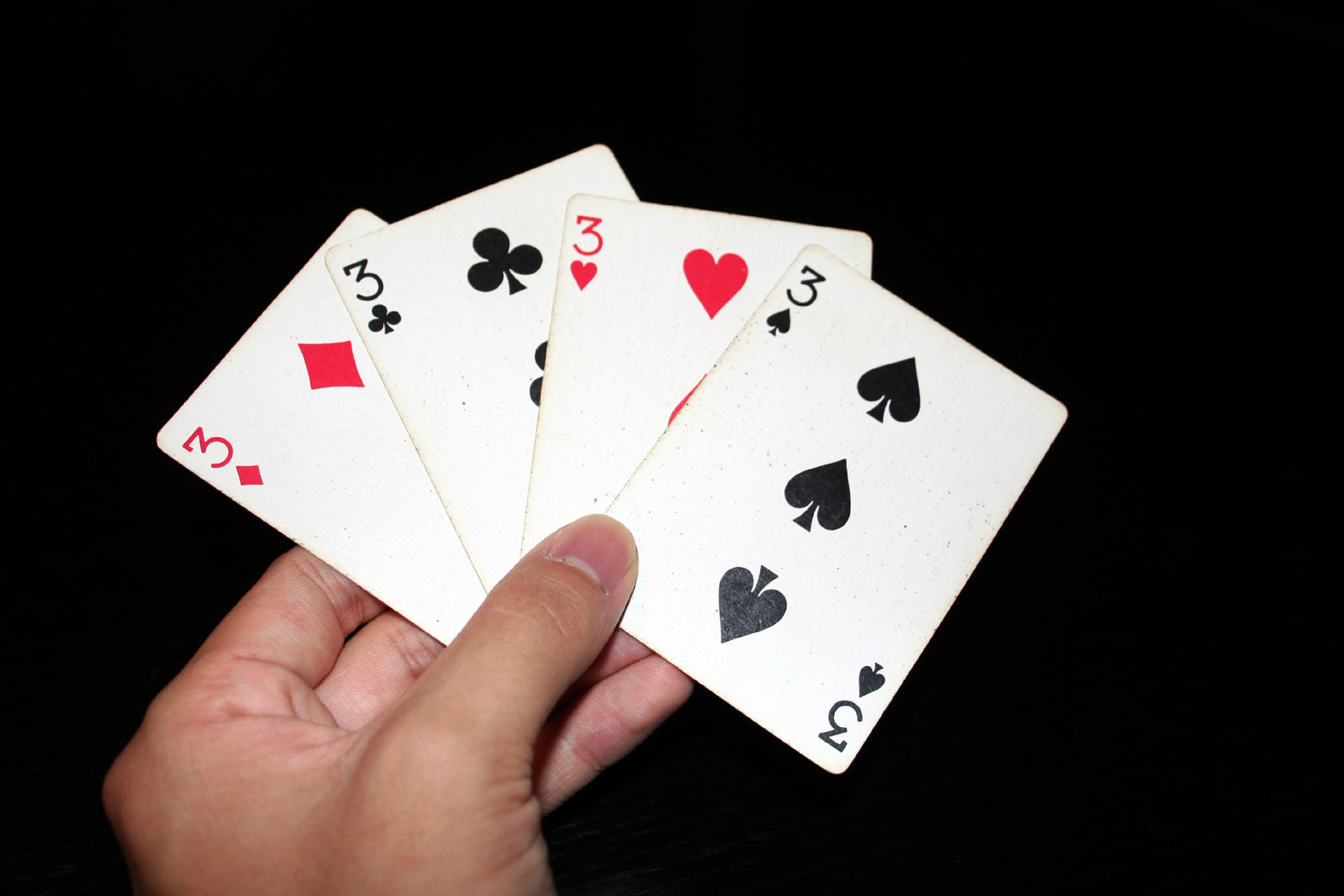
- The objective in Kemps is to achieve a hand of four cards of the same rank
- Type: Matching
- Players: 4-12
- Cards: 52
- Deck: French
- Rank (high→low): n/a
- Play: Simultaneous
- Playing time: 30 min.

Related games
- Commerce, Authors

Kemps is a matching card game for two to six teams of two players each, where each player must secretly communicate to their partner when they have four matching cards in their hand. The game is a "cross between Commerce and Authors" with the unusual feature of partnership play. This "party classic" is also known as Canes, Cash and Kent. It appears to be a 21st century game played in America, France and Switzerland.

== History ==
According to Kastner & Folkvord, Kemps originated in the French game, Carré-Coupé, which emerged in the early 1990s based on the "technically more inventive" game of Ochseln. In English-speaking countries it spread rapidly amongst the young under the name Kemps, thanks to its rapid pace and element of bluff, elements that reflect the zeitgeist of its time. Another source claims the rules were written by Cédric Louard in 1982.

== Objective ==
The game is played with a standard 52-card deck. The objective of Kemps is for a player to get four-of-a-kind (i.e., four cards of the same rank), and then to signal this to their partner. The partner must call the name of the game to score. On the scoresheet, a letter of the word KEMPS is written against teams as a penalty. The first team to spell K-E-M-P-S loses the game.

== Signalling ==
Prior to the game, partners confer to pick a single, secret visual signal that will indicate "I have four-of-a-kind" to their partner. Examples of signals would be tapping, gesturing, or holding cards a certain way, or the player winking or grimacing at their partner. Signals may not be verbal, and players are not permitted to agree any other signals beyond "I have four-of-a-kind". It is permissible to perform meaningless signals during the game in an attempt to confuse opponents, although some rules do not permit this.

After each round of play, a team may agree on a new signal, whether or not they suspect their opponents have guessed it.

Partners sit opposite each other, with the playing surface in the middle, so that opponents have a chance to see the signals.

== Deal ==
A dealer is chosen at random or by volunteering. The dealer deals 4 cards each, face down; players then examine their cards, after which four cards are dealt in a row and face up on the playing surface.

== Play ==
Players may now pick up one or more of the upcards and discard the same number from their hands. They do not take turns; it is a free-for-all. If two players go for the same card, the first to touch it has it. This continues until all players agree to clear all of the upcards. When this happens, the dealer discards all four upcards and deals four new ones. The process is repeated until the stock is used up or any player calls out "Kemps!" or "Stop Kemps!" to end the current deal.

A player may call "Kemps!" if they believe that their partner has four-of-a-kind. The round ends and the partner must then reveal their cards. If they have a four of a kind, the opponents gain a letter of the word KEMPS, starting with "K"; if not, the calling side receive a letter. The same dealer deals the next hand.

If a player believes that an opponent has four-of-a-kind and "Kemps!" has not yet been called, that player may stop the round by calling "Stop Kemps!" This ends the round, after which all opponents must show their cards. If one of the opponents does have a four-of-a-kind, then their team gain a letter, otherwise the calling side receive a letter.

== Variants ==
There are several variants in which the main change is the name and/or the word(s) used to stop the game.

=== Carré-Coupé ===
In the variant Carré-Coupé, a shortened pack may be used to speed up the game and a pot is used in which 11 chips are deposited. The calls are more elaborate. "Carré" is the equivalent of "Kemps" and "Coupé" of "Stop Kemps", each scoring 1 point and earning 1 chip from the pot; however there are also other calls with the following meanings:

- "Carré-Coupé": the partner and an opponent have a quartet, 2 points
- "Double Carré": both caller and partner have a quartet, 2 points
- "Double Coupé" both opponents have a quartet, 2 points
- "Quatre": all four players have a quartet, caller's team wins immediately

These can be emulated in Kemps with calls of "Kemps-Stop Kemps", "Double Kemps", etc.

=== Cash ===
In the variant called Cash, players call "Cash!" or "Counter Cash!" to stop the game. The dealer also deals the 4 table cards face down and then counts down "Three, two, one, go!" to start play. Penalty points are scored by spelling out the word C-A-S-H. If the stock runs out, the game is a draw.

=== Gemsch ===
In Switzerland, the game of Gemsch or Gämsch has more elaborate rules like Carré-Coupé.

=== Peanut Butter ===
In the variant Peanut Butter, players call "Peanut Butter!" when they believe their partner has a quartet, and "Jelly!" when they suspect their opponents have. In this variant, players may use verbal signals, and agree to play a specific (odd) number of rounds at the start of the game.

== Literature ==
- _ (2014). The Card Games Bible. London: Hamlyn; New York: Hachette; Toronto/Ontario: Canadian Manda Group. ISBN 978-0-600-62994-8
- Kastner, Hugo and Gerald Kador Folkvord (2005). "Mönch" in Die große Humboldt-Enzyklopädie der Kartenspiele (= Humboldt-Taschenbuch. Freizeit & Hobby. Vol. 4058). Schlütersche Verlagsgesellschaft, Baden-Baden. ISBN 3-89994-058-X.
- Parlett, David (2004). Dictionary of Card Games. Oxford: OUP. ISBN 1-84529-293-6
- Parlett, David (7 August 2008). The Penguin Book of Card Games. Penguin UK. ISBN 978-0-14-191610-1.
