= Kent (ship) =

At least seven ships with the name Kent served the Honourable East India Company as an East Indiaman between 1680 and 1825:

- Kent (c.1680), 130 tons burthen (bm), 27-28 crew and 12-20 guns, made two voyages to India between 1681 and 1687.
- Kent, 140 tons burthen, launched on the Thames in 1684 for Sir William Chardin.
- Kent (1703), launched on the Thames in 1703 for Sir Stephen Evance, a ship of 350 tons (bm), 26-30 guns and 70 crew, made four voyages to China or India between 1704 and 1716. Sold out of the EIC's service in 1717.
- Kent (c.1740), a ship of 498 (or 557) tons (bm), 30 guns and 99 crew, made four trips to India or China for the company between 1740 and 1756. Sold in 1756 for breaking up.
- Kent (1764), 842 (or 676) tons (bm), made four trips to India or China between 1764 and 1774. Sold for breaking up in 1774.
- Kent (1781 ship) was launched in Deptford. She made six voyages to India, China, and South East Asia for the British East India Company (EIC). She was sold for breaking up in 1797.
- Kent (1799 ship), 875 tons (bm), twenty-six 9 and 18-pounder guns, was on her first voyage, to Bengal, when the French privateer Robert Surcouf captured her on 7 October 1800.
- Kent (1820 ship), of 1332 tons (bm), made two voyages to Bombay and China and was lost at sea to a fire in 1825 at the beginning of her third voyage.

== See also ==
- HMS Kent
