= Parkyns =

Parkyns is a surname. Notable people with the surname include:

- Sir William Parkyns or Perkins (c. 1649 – 1696), English lawyer and Jacobite conspirator, executed for high treason
- Colonel Isham Parkyns, a royalist officer during the English Civil War known for his defence of Ashby-de-la-Zouch against Cromwell's forces, and father of the first of the Parkyns baronets of Bunny Hall in Nottinghamshire, including:
  - Sir Thomas Parkyns, 2nd Baronet (1664–1741), writer on wrestling
  - two barons in the peerage of Ireland, both of whom were Members of Parliament:
    - Thomas Parkyns, 1st Baron Rancliffe (1755–1800)
    - George Parkyns, 2nd Baron Rancliffe (1785–1850)
- Mansfield Parkyns (1823–1894), grandson of the 3rd baronet, English traveller, known for his travel book Life in Abyssinia

== See also ==
- Parkyn
