= George Parkyns, 2nd Baron Rancliffe =

English landowner and politician

George Parkyns 2nd Baron Rancliffe

Member of Parliament for Minehead
- In office 1806–1807
- Preceded by: John Patteson; John Fownes Luttrell
- Succeeded by: John Denison; John Fownes Luttrell

Member of Parliament for Nottingham
- In office 1812–1820
- Preceded by: Daniel Parker Coke; John Smith
- Succeeded by: Thomas Denman; Joseph Birch

Member of Parliament for Nottingham
- In office 1826–1830
- Preceded by: Thomas Denman; Joseph Birch
- Succeeded by: Thomas Denman; Sir Ronald Craufurd Ferguson

George Augustus Henry Anne Parkyns, 2nd Baron Rancliffe (10 June 1785 – 1 November 1850) of Bunny Hall was an English landowner and politician from Nottinghamshire. A baron in the peerage of Ireland, he sat in the House of Commons of the United Kingdom for thirteen of the years between 1806 and 1830.

Lord Rancliffe's politics were those of an advanced whig, with links to radicalism, and by the 1830s he supported many of the demands of the Chartists. His championing of progressive causes was later tempered by his private support for protectionism, and had always jarred with his public image as a playboy enjoying his inherited wealth. The History of Parliament describes him as an "aristocratic buffoon".

== Early life and family ==
Parkyns was born on 10 June 1785, the oldest child and only son of Thomas Boothby Parkyns, 1st Baron Rancliffe (1755–1800). His father was a grandson of Sir Thomas Parkyns, 2nd Baronet (1664–1741), a writer on wrestling whose own father had been awarded the baronetcy in 1681 in recognition of the royalist service of his father Colonel Isham Parkyns during the English Civil War. George was named after his godfather Prince George Augustus, then Prince of Wales and later King George IV, who was a friend of George's father.

His father's peerage had been secured in 1795 as a reward for his political support of the 3rd Duke of Portland. As an Irish title, it did not prevent its holder from sitting in the British House of Commons.

His mother Elizabeth Anne was the daughter and sole heir of Sir William James, 1st Baronet of Eltham, in Kent. Sir William was a nabob, a self-made man whose fortune was acquired in naval prize money and private commerce from his service with the British East India Company, of which he later became a director. He died of a stroke on the day of his daughter's wedding.

== Career ==
=== Education, army and inheritance ===
Parkyns was educated at Harrow, under Rev Dr Drury. His father died of dropsy in November 1800, when George was only 15. He succeeded his father as the second Baron Rancliffe and was placed under guardianship of the Earl Moira (later Marquess of Hastings).

In 1801 Moira purchased a commission in the British Army for the young Lord Rancliffe, as a cornet in the 10th Light Dragoons, which was then seen as a first-rate regiment. In 1803 he purchased a promotion to the rank of lieutenant in the 15th Light Dragoons. The transfer placed of regiment placed him on half-pay, retaining his rank until the half-pay was stopped in 1834. He also became an equerry to his godfather the Prince of Wales, retaining a close friendship until the prince parted company with the Whigs.

On 17 March 1806 he succeeded to the baronetcy of his grandfather Sir Thomas Parkyns, 3rd Baronet. Later the same month he joined Brooks's club, and on his twenty-first birthday in June, he came into an annual income of £21,000 a year (equivalent to £2.15 million in 2023). His inheritance included Bunny Hall and the manor of Bunny in Nottinghamshire, which had been in the Parkyns family since 1574 when it was bought by the barrister Richard Parkyns.

=== Minehead and marriage ===
Earl Moira then helped to negotiate for Rancliffe a seat in Parliament. At the general election in November 1806, the 21-year-old Rancliffe was returned as a member of parliament (MP) for Minehead in Somerset. Minehead was a rotten borough, under the patronage of John Fownes Luttrell, whose family had controlled the borough's elections for large periods since its enfranchisement in the 16th century. Fownes Luttrell charged Rancliffe £5,000 for the seat (equivalent to £512,000 in 2023). Rancliffe later cited his experience in Minehead as evidence in favour of parliamentary reform, saying that he had paid a lot of money for the seat but had never in his life set foot in the town.

In October 1807 Rancliffe married Earl Moira's niece, Lady Elizabeth Mary Theresa Forbes, daughter of George Forbes, 6th Earl of Granard. The wedding took place by special licence in Castle Forbes, County Longford, Ireland, where the "beautiful and accomplished" bride was given away by her uncle. The honeymoon was in another seat of the Earl of Granard, Clanhugh Lodge near Mullingar in County Westmeath.

The couple had no legitimate children.

== Death ==
Lord Rancliffe died at Bunny Hall on 1 November 1850, aged 65. He had been ill for a long time, and seriously ill for two years. After a funeral service in St Mary's parish church in Bunny on 11 November, he was buried in the Parkyns family vault in the church's chancel.

The peerage became extinct on his death, and the baronetcy descended to his first cousin Thomas George Augustus Parkyns, a grandson of the 3rd baronet and the older brother of the travel writer Mansfield Parkyns. His entailed property fell to his nephew Sir Richard Levinge, 7th Baronet of Knockdrin Castle in Ireland, the son of his oldest sister Elizabeth Anne, who had married Sir Richard Levinge, 6th Baronet in 1810.

Under the terms of their separation agreement, his estranged wife's income was doubled to £2,000 per annum (equivalent to £270,000 in 2023).

Parliament of the United Kingdom
Preceded by John Patteson; John Fownes Luttrell	Member of Parliament for Minehead; 1806 – 1807; With: Sir John Lethbridge, Bt 1806 – January 1807; John Fownes Luttrell from January 1807	Succeeded by John Denison; John Fownes Luttrell
Preceded by Daniel Parker Coke; John Smith	Member of Parliament for Nottingham; 1812 – 1820; With: John Smith to 1818; Joseph Birch from 1818	Succeeded by Thomas Denman; Joseph Birch
Preceded by Thomas Denman; Joseph Birch	Member of Parliament for Nottingham; 1826 – 1830; With: Joseph Birch	Succeeded by Thomas Denman; Sir Ronald Craufurd Ferguson
Peerage of Ireland
Preceded by Thomas Boothby Parkyns	Baron Rancliffe; 1800–1850	Extinct
Baronetage of England
Preceded by Thomas Parkyns	Baronet (of Bunney Park); 1806–1850	Succeeded by Thomas George Augustus Parkyns
