= Rookley Manor, Hampshire =

Historic country house in Up Somborne, Hampshire, England

Rookley Manor
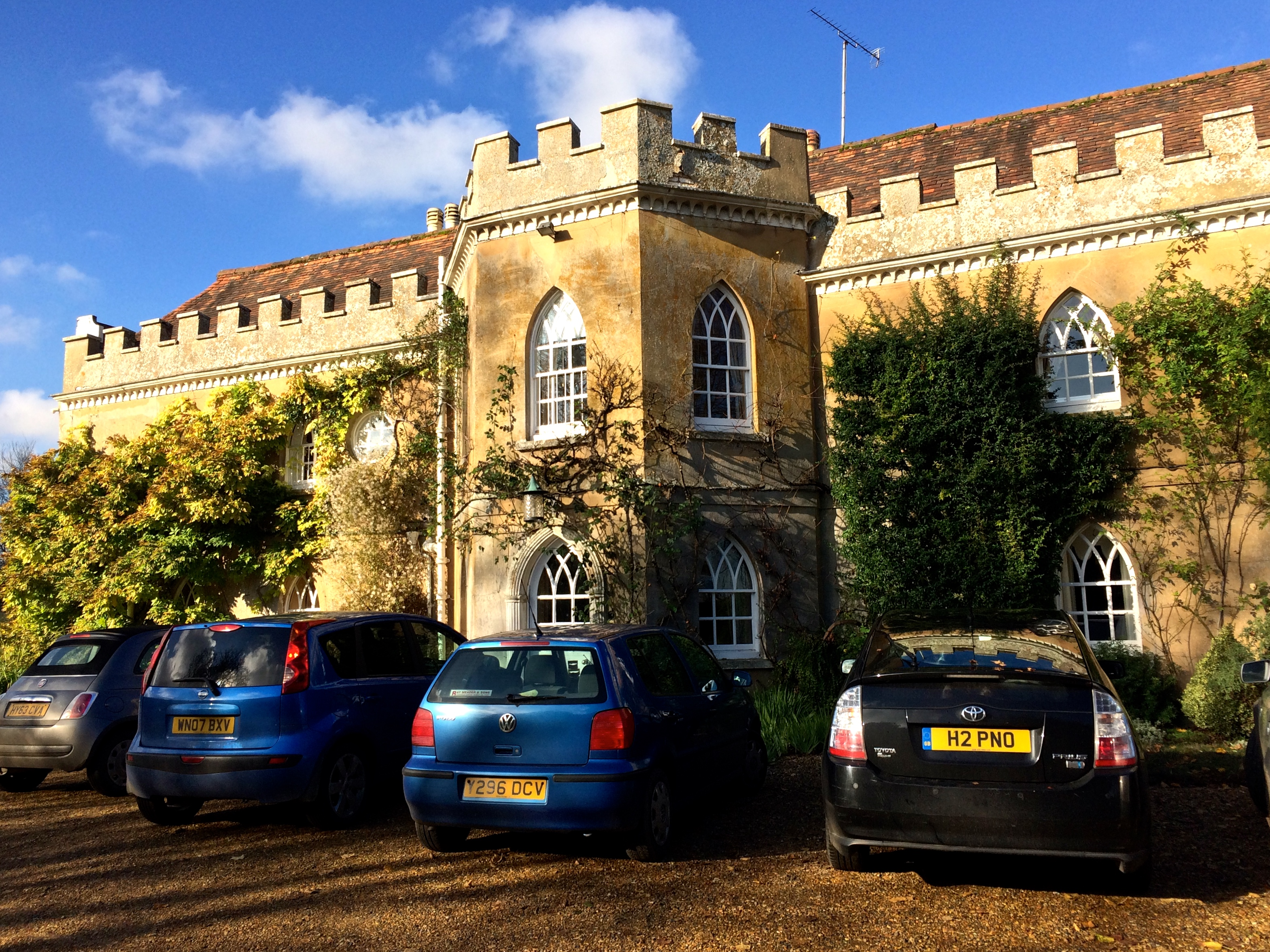
- Interactive map of the Rookley Manor area
- Alternative names: Rookley House

General information
- Status: For sale
- Architectural style: Medieval/Gothic architecture
- Location: Up Somborne, Hampshire, Strawberry Lane, Kings Somborne, SO20 6QX, England
- Coordinates: 51.0927°N 1.4367°W
- Construction started: Late-15th century
- Renovated: 18th century

Height
- Roof: Hipped roof

Technical details
- Structural system: Late-Medieval timber frame
- Material: Wood frame, extensive 18th century recladding in brick and render
- Floor count: 2 plus attic
- Floor area: 9,399 square feet (873.2 m^{2})
- Grounds: 10.65 acres (4.31 ha)

Design and construction
- Awards: Grade II* listed

Rookley Manor is a Grade II* listed country house, located in Up Somborne in Hampshire, England.

== Background ==
Located within the fertile Test Valley as part of the parish of Godshill, Hampshire, it was first established as la Spaund Manor prior to 1203, under the control of the de Aula family. By the middle of the 13th century, it was owned by William Russell, the Lord of Yaverland, leased to his nobleman John Rivers. By 1280 it was owned by William's son Richard Russell, who by 1316 had passed it to Barton Priory possibly for use as an Oratory; the hamlet still to this day has never had a church. By 1431 it was leased by John Roucle, who changed his name to the more anglophile John Rookley. Most of the present day farms surrounding the current hamlet of Rookley were first noted in the Middle Ages, but all were associated with the original manor house. At some point, the estate fell into the ownership of the Worsley baronets of Appuldurcombe House.

== Structure ==
Although the current two-storey property is dated by some from the early 18th century, the core of the house is constructed around a late-Medieval timber frame farmhouse structure, dating it to the late 15th century and possibly as late as 1670, which has latterly been extensively reclad.

The rendered southwest facade dates from 1707, whilst the front which faces southeast was reconstructed in the late 1700s in a rough-rendered gothic architecture form. The north side is painted red brick, in English bond pattern which exposes the original timber frame, and is linked to a single-storey service wing. The whole house is topped by a hipped roof, into which windows on some sides extended, mainly using Yorkshire-style sash windows.

Internally entranced through a centrally located open porch on an extending angular bay, the four-panelled door leads to a marble-floored entrance hall and 17th century oak staircase. Many of the rooms retain 18th century fireplaces, whilst the main bedroom retains both its fireplace and complete oak panelling.

Externally, a 20th-century two-storey addition on the north links to an 18th-century two-storey cottage, which further extends to a similarly dated single-storey stable block. All are constructed in matching Flemish bond red brick, with casement windows. There are farming buildings, two walled gardens, two apple orchards and a Lime tree-lined avenue in the immediate surrounding 10.65 acres (4.31 ha) of grounds. From 1795 enclosure of the surrounding farm lands had started to occur, and by 1837 the manor grounds including the associated farm were listed as having a total size of 698 acres (282 ha).

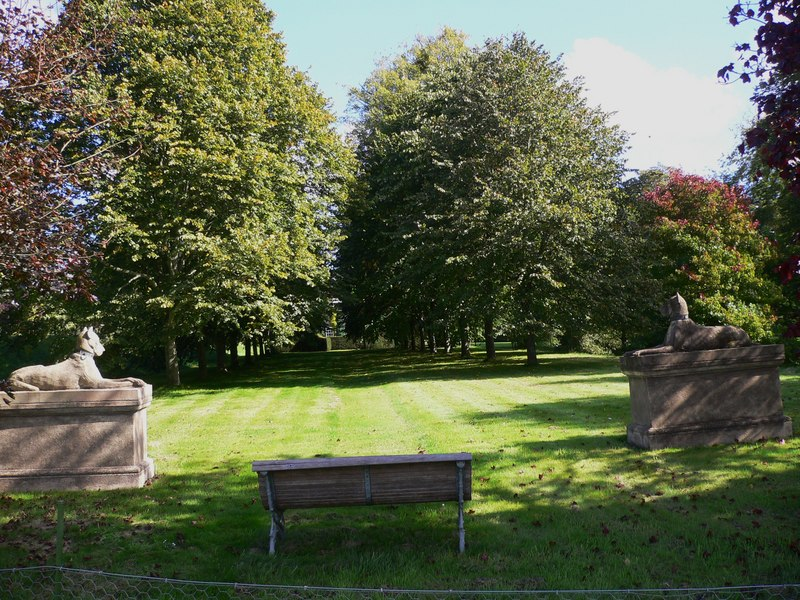
Avenue at Rookley Manor (2010) by Shazz

First listed in 1955, the farmhouse became Grade II* listed in August 1984.

== Residents ==
Leased out from the estate of Worsley baronets of Appuldurcombe House, in the late 17th century the house was occupied by Thomas Hobbs (1647–1698), a physician to James II of England whose other clients included noted poet John Dryden.

From 1776 to 1783 it was leased as a hunting lodge to HRH Prince Henry, Duke of Cumberland and Strathearn (7 November 1745 – 18 September 1790), third son of Frederick, Prince of Wales, and grandson of King George II. His equerry from 1783 to 1790 was Thomas Boothby Parkyns MP (24 July 1755 – 17 November 1800), first son of Sir Thomas Parkyns, 3rd Parkyns Baronet, of Bunny Park, Notts. After Prince Henry's death in 1790, Parkyns took over the lease until his own death from oedema on 17 November 1800.

In 1854 Charles Anderson-Pelham, 2nd Earl of Yarborough sold the property to Mr. W.J. Lyle, who later sold it onwards to Mr. Reginald Freke Williams. In June 2014 it was put up for sale via agents Strutt & Parker.

=== George IV and Maria Fitzherbert ===
After the twice widowed Maria Fitzherbert entered London society, in spring 1784 she was introduced to George, Prince of Wales, six years her junior. Pursuing an affair, in part believed undertaken at Rookley Manor, on 15 December 1785 they illegally married under the Royal Marriages Act 1772 in the drawing room of her house in Park Street, Mayfair, London. Although George latter married his first cousin, Duchess Caroline of Brunswick who bore him a daughter Princess Charlotte of Wales, on 10 January 1796, George wrote his last will and testament, bequeathing all his "worldly property . . . to my Maria Fitzherbert, my wife, the wife of my heart and soul". During the summer of 1798, by which time he had separated from Caroline and was bored with his mistress, Frances Villiers, Countess of Jersey, the couple reconciled again after the Pope deemed their marriage legitimate, meeting again at previous tryst locations including Rookley. During the Regency era (1811–1820), George had so enjoyed the tennis court at Rookley, that he had it dug up and moved to nearby Crawley Court which he was leasing at the time. Before he died, Maria wrote to George wishing him well, whilst the King asked to be buried with Fitzherbert's eye miniature around his neck, which was done.

=== Vanity Fair ===
William Makepeace Thackeray was a successful 19th century writer and novelist by the time that he came to write Vanity Fair, but was also a virtual-widower as his wife had been held in a mental institute since 1842 due to severe depression. This made Thackeray, even with three young children in boarding school, a noted traveller/person of no fixed abode. Thackeray had strong ties to Hampshire, having in 1815 after his father died in India been sent to his grandmother's residence in Fareham for his education, and latterly resided there with his aunt. Having been friended by the elder Charles Anderson-Pelham, 1st Earl of Yarborough, it is hence strongly rumoured that as his father had allowed Thackeray to stay in other property that he owned in Hampshire and the Isle of Wight, that after his father's death that Charles Anderson-Pelham, 2nd Earl of Yarborough allowed Thackeray to write Vanity Fair whilst temporarily resident at Rookley Manor. The later novel was first published as a series of extracts in Punch magazine between January 1847 and July 1848.
