= Thomas Parkyns =

Thomas Parkyns may refer to:

- Sir Thomas Parkyns, 2nd Baronet (1664–1741), English writer, landowner, architect and engineer
- Thomas Parkyns, 1st Baron Rancliffe (1755–1800), English soldier, member of parliament and Irish peer
