= Bradmore, Nottinghamshire =

Village and civil parish in Nottinghamshire, England

Coordinates: 52.87514°N 1.13078°W

Bradmore
- Village and civil parish
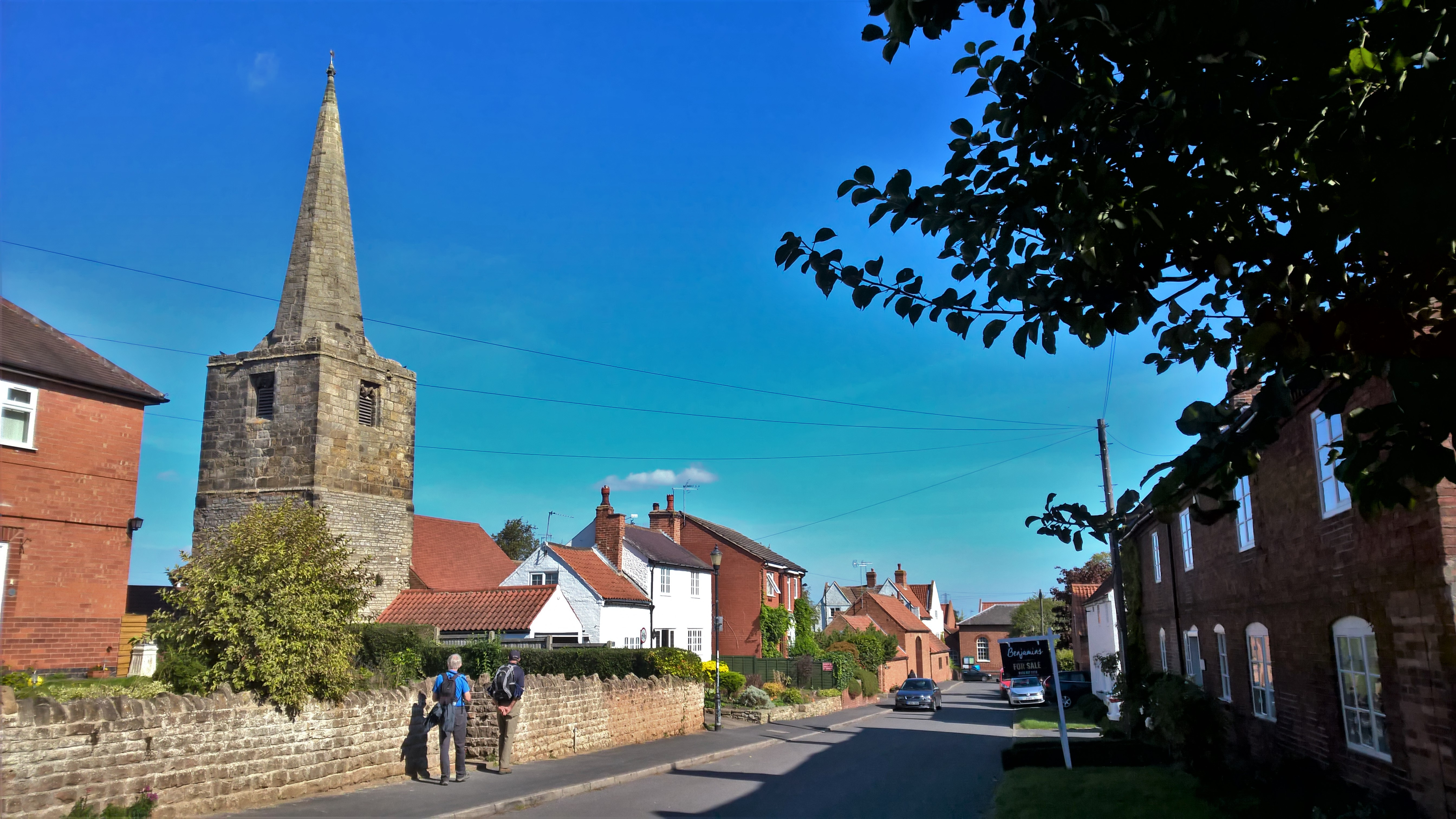
- Bradmore former church tower, spire and street scene

- Location within Nottinghamshire
- Interactive map of Bradmore
- Area: 1.97 sq mi (5.1 km^{2})
- Population: 298 (2021)
  - Density: 151/sq mi (58/km^{2})
- OS grid reference: SK 5849531241
  - London: 105 mi (169 km) SSE
- District: Rushcliffe
- Shire county: Nottinghamshire
- Region: East Midlands
- Country: England
- Sovereign state: United Kingdom
- Post town: NOTTINGHAM
- Postcode district: NG11
- Dialling code: 0115
- Police: Nottinghamshire
- Fire: Nottinghamshire
- Ambulance: East Midlands
- UK Parliament: Rushcliffe
- Website: www.bradmorevillage.org.uk

Bradmore is a village and civil parish in the Rushcliffe district of Nottinghamshire with a population in 2001 of 320, rising slightly to 328 at the 2011 census and falling to 298 at the 2021 census. It is just to the south of Ruddington, on the A60. Nearby places are Keyworth, Bunny, Ruddington and Gotham.

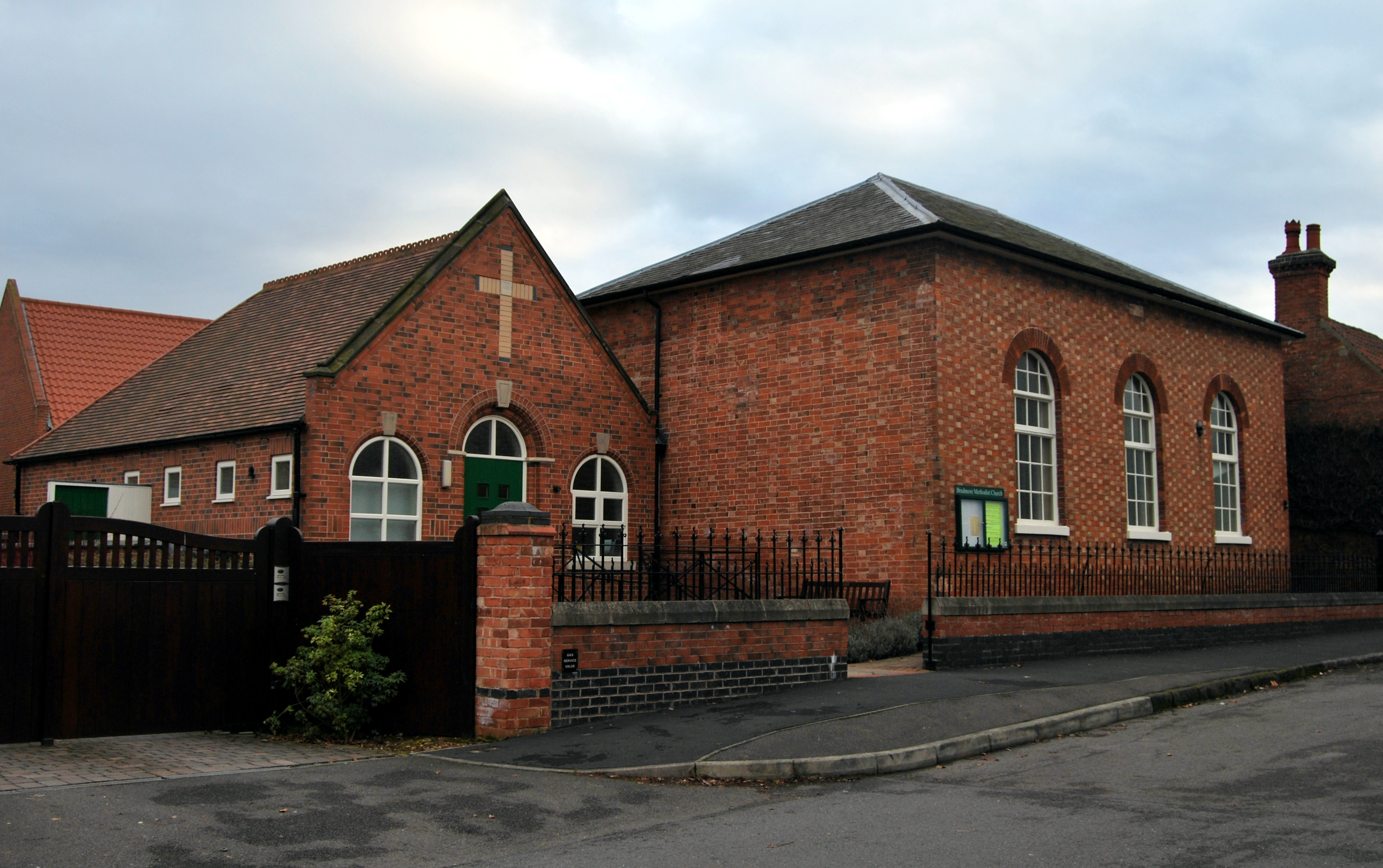
Bradmore Methodist Chapel

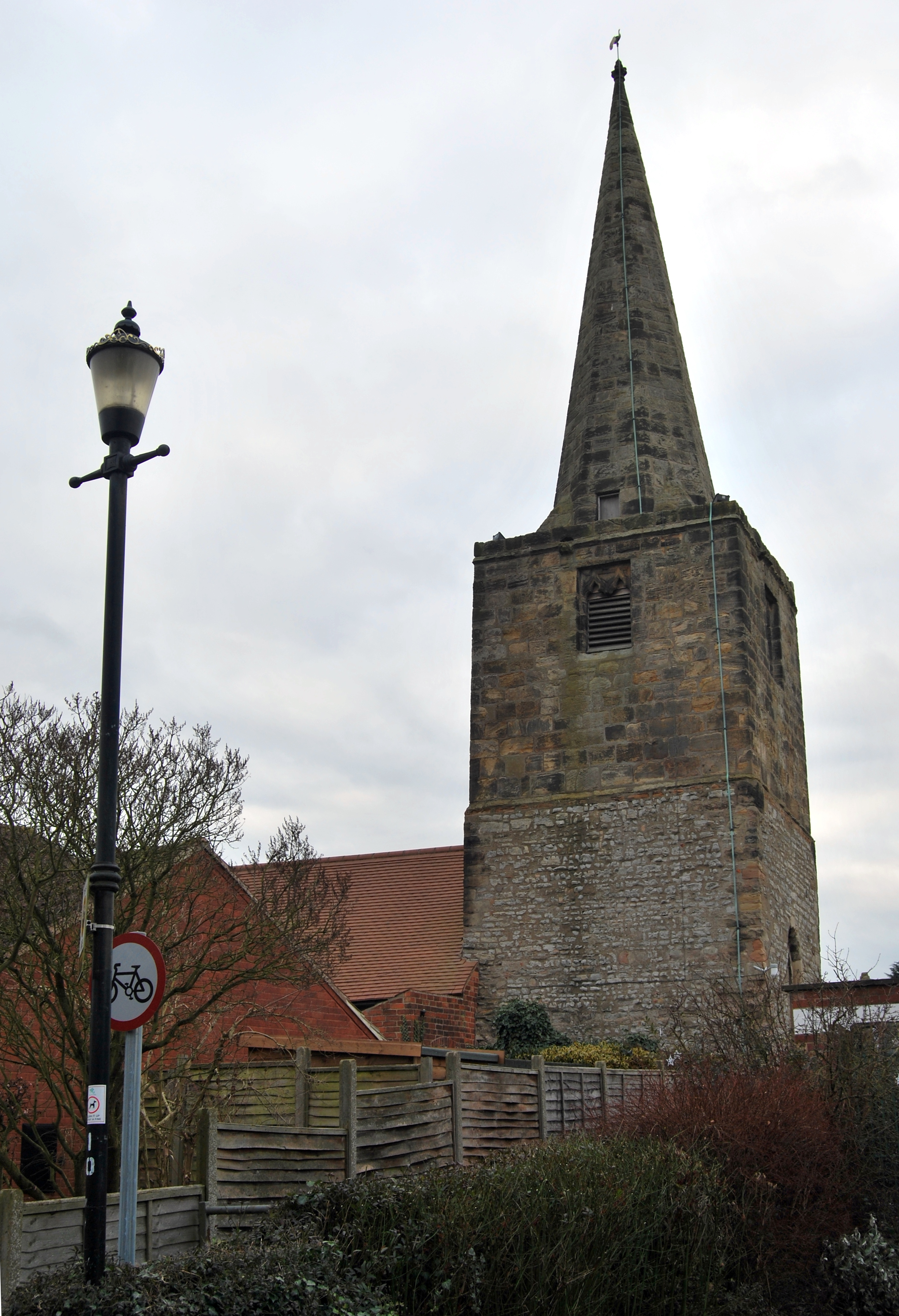
Bradmore Church North Aspect

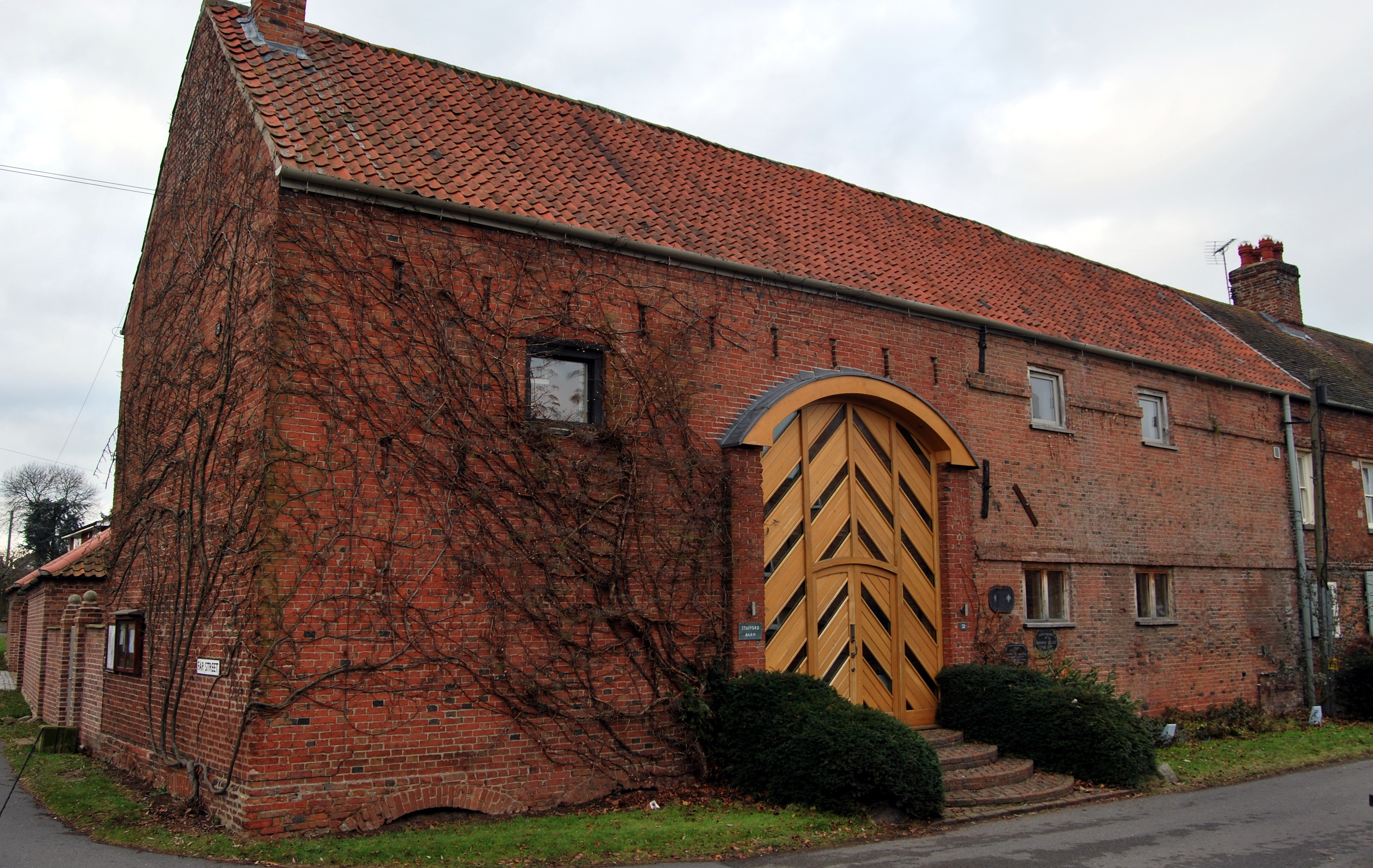
Converted barn in Bradmore

Bunny School is a small school of around 100 children from Bunny and Bradmore. Secondary school children go to South Wolds School, in nearby Keyworth. The great fire of Bradmore happened on 2 July 1705 when many of the village cottages along Far Street and Main Street were destroyed. The 300th anniversary of the great fire was celebrated on Saturday 2 July 2005.

Bradmore Methodist Church and Community Hall was extensively modernised in 2003 and is a popular centre for village activities, being also available for private functions. The Methodist Church has services every Sunday at 10:15 as well as a Sunday School (for 5-11s). There are many activities at the Community Hall including monthly Bradmore lunches, 3Cs Saturday coffee morning, Women's Institute, Yoga classes and Craft group.

== History ==
Bradmore was, until quite recently, a farming community, but now the conversion of farm buildings to private residences has altered the nature of the village, and it has become a place to live for people who work in Nottingham and the surrounding areas. Part of the village has been declared a conservation area to retain the visual character. Some of the old farmhouses were built by Sir Thomas Parkyn, the wrestling Baronet of Bunny Hall.

The church, first built with a square tower in the thirteenth century and with an octagonal spire in the fourteenth century suffered badly in the fire of 1705 and only the tower and spire remained. The church was never rebuilt but a mission hall was built adjoining the tower in 1881, first used for occasional services but later as a men's institute and recreation hall. The spire was damaged during an earth tremor in 1957 and when this was repaired the opportunity was taken to refurbish the tower room and use it again for Communion services once a month. At the time that the spire was repaired the weather vane was re-gilded. Between 1705 and 1830, when the Wesleyan Methodist Church was built, there was no regular place of worship in the village. The Methodist Church and the Sunday School Room are in a central position on Farmer Street. Services are held each Sunday, usually at 10.15, and a joint Anglican and Methodist Sunday School has been created for children from Bunny and Bradmore.

Because of the village's position on high ground there were at one time two windmills serving the village. The last one was a post mill at the top of Far Street (grid reference SK581311), built before 1832, derelict in the 1870s and burnt down on 5 November 1880. It had an open trestle and a tailpole.

Although at one time there were two alehouses within the village, the village does not now have a public house.

Two of the village street names have unclear interpretations. Ramper (or Rampart) is of uncertain origin because there is no evidence of any incline or earthworks nearby. Although this name is not recorded on any Ordnance Survey map, it was frequently used in old written records. Another is Donkey Lane, believed to be a lane where travellers kept their animals when they were in the village. The others are fairly straightforward, Farmer Street, Main Street, Far Street and one recently acquired one, Littlemoor Lane, which was given only in 1996 to a previously unnamed and unadopted road. Newly built housing schemes have been called by the name of the farm that existed before they were built, hence Manor Farm Close.

It is apparent that the village was at one time an entirely self-sufficient community. Apart from the farmers, there were 2 butchers, a tailor, a baker, a miller, two saddlers, a wheelwright, a carrier, a blacksmith, a maltster and a joiner, and, of course, the alehouse keepers. There were also stockingers plying their trade in the village for many years. As part of the village millennium celebrations it was decided to research all the families recorded as having lived in the village, the houses they lived in and the names of the fields they cultivated. This document, which is now many hundreds of pages long, will be deposited in the Nottingham Record Office for the benefit of future historians and those investigating their ancestors.

Some fascinating stories have been discovered. The most poignant is the case of William Barnes or Burn who, on 7 October 1765, was sentenced to be transported for 7 years to His Majesty’s colonies or plantations in America for obtaining the sum of 6d from John Savage of Bradmore by falsely pretending that he, William Barnes, was lame of his right arm. The only other misdemeanour by a Bradmore resident that we can find is this extract from Volume 2 of the records of the Borough of Nottingham 1399–1485. “The Jurors from the east side say, upon their oath, that Ellen Scott of Bradmore, in the County of Nottingham, housewife, on the twelfth day of May, in the twenty-second year of the reign of Edward the Fourth, and upon other days and occasions, commonly and usually, at Nottingham aforesaid, did regrate eggs, butter and cheese brought to the market of the town aforesaid, and did sell them again in the same market, to the dearness and detriment of our said Lord the King’s folk and against his peace”. In other words, she bought the food cheap and sold it dear. There is no record of her punishment.

In partnership with Nottinghamshire County Council and the Countryside Commission, the Parish Council participates in the Parish Paths Partnership scheme. The network of footpaths within the parish have been surveyed and new stiles, signposts and waymark signs have been installed. A leaflet showing these paths is available from various County establishments.

== See also ==
- Listed buildings in Bradmore, Nottinghamshire
