= St Mary's Church, Bunny =

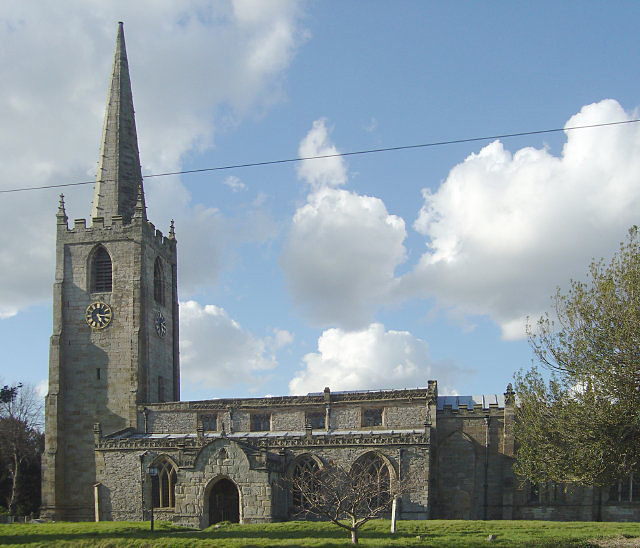
- St Mary's Church, Bunny
- St Mary's Church, Bunny
- 52°51′38.3″N 1°8′9.51″W
- OS grid reference: SK 58288 29598
- Location: Bunny, Nottinghamshire
- Country: England
- Denomination: Church of England
- Website: https://www.keyworthstantonbunnychurch.com/welcome.htm

History
- Dedication: St Mary

Architecture
- Heritage designation: Grade I listed

Administration
- Diocese: Diocese of Southwell and Nottingham
- Archdeaconry: Newark
- Deanery: East Bingham
- Parish: Bunny with Bradmore

St Mary's Church, Bunny is a Grade I listed parish church in the Church of England in Bunny, Nottinghamshire.

== History ==
The present church dates from the 14th century. It was restored in 1718 for Sir Thomas Parkyns, 2nd Baronet of Bunny Hall. There were also later restorations in 1890–1891 and 1911. The initial 14th-century build was temporarily halted by the spread of the plague into the village in 1350. The present building has developed over several centuries. The nave and aisles were built of loosely-coursed rubble, quite different from the hewn, squared stone of the later 14th-century chancel and tower. Inside there is an oak screen, also dated as 14th century, and the vestry has a medieval aumbry – a cupboard where the sacred vessels were kept. The south porch, with its stone seats, was added in the 15th century.

The church is in a joint parish with

- Bradmore Mission Room
- St Mary Magdalene's Church, Keyworth
- All Saints' Church, Stanton on the Wolds

== Memorials ==
- George Augustus Henry Anne Parkyns, 1830, wall tablet in the east chancel
- Thomas Boothby Parkyns, 1800, wall tablet in the east chancel
- George Alexander Forteath, 1862, wall tablet in the south chancel
- Sir Thomas Parkyns, d.1806, by John Bacon
- Dame Anne Parkyns, 1725, by Edward Poynton
- Richard Parkyns, 1603
- Isabella Beetham, 1814, south aisle
- Isabella Ann Beetham, 1801, south aisle
- Henry Cropper, 1812 by T. & E. Gaffin of Regent Street
- Henry Cropper, 1726
- Elizabeth Cropper, 1800, by J. Peck
- Henry Cropper, 1794
- Humphrey Barley, 1571, inscription obliterated
- Sir Thomas Parkyns, 1741. North aisle. Designed by himself

== Organ ==
The organ is by J. W. Walker & Sons Ltd dating from 1909. It was reconstructed in 1916 by Charles Lloyd. A specification of the organ can be found on the National Pipe Organ Register.

=== Organists ===
- Arthur Smedley 1948 - 1965 (afterwards organist at St Nicholas Church, Nottingham)

== See also ==
- Grade I listed buildings in Nottinghamshire
- Listed buildings in Bunny, Nottinghamshire
