= Listed buildings in Bradmore, Nottinghamshire =

Bradmore is a civil parish in the Rushcliffe district of Nottinghamshire, England. The parish contains 19 listed buildings that are recorded in the National Heritage List for England. All the listed buildings are designated at Grade II, the lowest of the three grades, which is applied to "buildings of national importance and special interest". The parish contains the village of Bradmore and the surrounding area, and all the listed buildings are in the village. The village buildings were largely destroyed by a fire in 1705, including the body of the church, but its tower and spire survived and are listed. Following the fire, Sir Thomas Parkyns of Bunny Hall, designed new buildings for the village, many of which are listed, and these include houses, farmhouses and farm buildings. The other listed buildings include a chapel and a telephone kiosk.

== Buildings ==
Name and location	Photograph	Date	Notes
Tower and spire of former church 52.87487°N 1.13380°W		13th century	The body of the church was destroyed in a fire in 1705. The tower is in stone on a plinth and has two stages, the upper stage dating from the 14h century. The lower stage has quoins and a window with a pointed arch. The upper stage contains bell openings with trefoil-arched lights. At the top is a parapet and the remains of a gargoyle, and it is surmounted by a broach spire.
Innisfree; 52.87433°N 1.13436°W	—	17th century	A timber framed cottage with brick infill, rendered at the rear, with a pantile roof. There is a single storey and an attic, and two bays. On the front is a porch and a 20th-century window, and at the rear are two dormers. Inside there is exposed timber framing.
Blackcliffe Farmhouse; 52.87565°N 1.13290°W		c. 1700	The farmhouse is in red brick with stone dressings, floor bands, and a tile roof with brick coped gables and kneelers. There are two storeys and four bays, and to the left is a lean-to with a pantile roof. The doorway has a segmental head, and the windows are two-light casements with mullions.
Rufford Lodge, outbuildings and barn 52.87519°N 1.13276°W		c. 1700	The house is in rendered red brick, with floor bands, and a pantile roof with lead coped gables and kneelers. There are two storeys and attics, and three bays, and two rear wings. In the centre is a doorway, and the windows are two-light casements with mullions. Attached at the rear is a single-storey outbuilding converted for residential use, and beyond that is a two-storey barn with a large doorway, and a single-storey range.
15 Farmer Street; 52.87581°N 1.13302°W		Early 18th century	A house in red brick with a floor band, dentilled eaves, and a pantile roof with brick coped gables and kneelers. There are two storeys, three bays, a two-storey rear wing, and a single-storey single-bay wing on the left. In the centre is a doorway, the windows are tripartite casements, and the ground floor openings have segmental heads.
Barn behind Blackcliffe Farmhouse; 52.87591°N 1.13224°W		Early 18th century	The barn, later converted for residential use, is in red brick, and has a roof of tile and pantile with brick coped gables and kneelers. There is a single storey and attics, and two bays. The barn contains a large doorway, a smaller doorway with a segmental head, and blocked slit vents.
Debdale and barn 52.87461°N 1.13124°W		Early 18th century	A farmhouse, later a house and cottage, and an attached barn, in red brick with two storeys. The house has a plinth, raised eaves bands, and a tile roof with brick coped gables and kneelers. There are two storeys and four bays, a doorway and casement windows, all with segmental heads. To the right is a lower cottage with a pantile roof and two bays, and further to the right is a single-storey single-bay outbuilding. To the left of the house is a barn with a pantile roof and five bays. In the ground floor are various blocked openings, including slit vents, and the upper floor contains fixed lights.
Barn east of Rancliffe Farmhouse; 52.87419°N 1.13166°W	—	Early 18th century	The barn, later converted for residential use, is in red brick, and has a roof of pantile with brick coped gables and kneelers. There are two storeys and two bays. The barn contains a two-storey doorway, a casement windows, and eight slit vents.
Stafford House and barn 52.87551°N 1.13304°W		Early 18th century	The house and adjoining barn are in red brick. The house has floor bands, and a tile roof with a coped gable and a kneeler on the right. There are two storeys and five bays. Steps lead up to the central doorway, and the windows are a mix of sashes and casements. The barn attached to the left is of the same height, with a pantile roof and three storeys. The openings include a large segmental archway flanked by pilaster buttresses, and slit vents, and there are two blind segmental arches.
The Old Barn; 52.87394°N 1.13176°W	—	Early 18th century	A threshing barn converted into a house in about 1980. It is in red brick on a splayed plinth, and has a pantile roof with brick coped gables and kneelers. There are two storeys and five bays. It contains a two-storey doorway flanked by pilaster buttresses, and to the right are two segmental arches. To the left is a fixed light in a former doorway with a segmental hood mould, a fixed light and blocked slit vents.
Tofts Farmhouse; 52.87416°N 1.13081°W		Early 18th century	The farmhouse is in red brick on a stepped plinth, with raised eaves bands and a tile roof. There are two storeys and a cellar, and three bays, and to the right is a lower wing with two storeys and an attic, and two bays. The windows in the main part are casements with raised brick arches, and in the wing they have flat heads.
Southwell House; 52.87457°N 1.13371°W		1730	A red brick house on a plinth, with stone dressings, a floor band, dentilled eaves, and a pantile roof with brick coped gables and kneelers. There are two storeys and six bays. On the front is a doorway and casement windows, the openings on the ground floor with segmental heads. In the left gable is a dated plaque.
Rancliffe Farmhouse; 52.87424°N 1.13196°W		1736	The farmhouse is in red brick with some black brick and stone, on a plinth, with a raised eaves band, and a tile roof with brick coped gables and corbelled out kneelers. There are three storeys and a cellar, and a double depth plan, with two gabled bays, and a recessed single-storey wing on the right. The cellar has four blocked segmental arches, and the windows are casements with segmental arches and brick hood moulds. In the gable apices are initials and the date in black brick headers.
28 Farmer Street; 52.87560°N 1.13340°W		Mid 18th century	Two houses later combined into one, they are in red brick. The older house to the left dates mainly from the early 19th century, and has the remains of a floor band, dogtooth eaves and a slate roof. There are two storeys and three bays, a central doorway and sash windows, all the openings with segmental heads. The right house dates from the 20th-century and is lower, with a tile roof, two storeys and three bays, and various openings.
130 Loughborough Road and outbuildings 52.87397°N 1.13072°W	—	Mid 18th century	The main range of the house dates from the early 19th century. It is in red brick with dentilled eaves and a pantile roof, two storeys and three bays. In the centre is a doorway, the windows are sashes, and all the openings have segmental heads. At the rear is an earlier wing with a single storey and attics and two bays with a tile roof. To the left of the house is a range of outbuildings.
1 Main Street; 52.87470°N 1.13342°W		Mid 18th century	A house in whitewashed brick with a raised eaves band and a pantile roof. There are two storeys and four bays. On the front are a doorway, a single horizontally-sliding sash window in the upper floor, and the other windows are casements. All the openings in the ground floor have segmental arches.
27 Farmer Street; 52.87508°N 1.13236°W		Early 19th century	A house in red brick with dogtooth eaves and a pantile roof. There are two storeys and four bays, the right bay added later. On the front is a recessed doorway and tripartite casement windows, the window in the right bay with a segmental arch.
Wesleyan Methodist Chapel; 52.87522°N 1.13243°W		1830	The chapel is built with red brick stretchers and pink headers, and has a hipped slate roof. There is a single storey and three bays, and it contains three round-arched casement windows.
Telephone kiosk 52.87486°N 1.13312°W		1935	The K6 type telephone kiosk in Main Street near Rufford Lodge was designed by Giles Gilbert Scott. Constructed in cast iron with a square plan and a dome, it has three unperforated crowns in the top panels.
