= Listed buildings in Bunny, Nottinghamshire =

Bunny is a civil parish in the Rushcliffe district of Nottinghamshire, England. The parish contains 25 listed buildings that are recorded in the National Heritage List for England. Of these, two are listed at Grade I, the highest of the three grades, two are at Grade II*, the middle grade, and the others are at Grade II, the lowest grade. The parish contains the village of Bunny and the surrounding area. Many of the listed buildings were designed by Sir Thomas Parkyns, including his home, the country house Bunny Hall and associated structures. In the village he designed houses and associated structures, a coaching inn, a school and almshouses, a water house, and the vicarage. The other listed buildings include a church, and another school, later the parish rooms.

== Key ==
Grade	Criteria
I	Buildings of exceptional interest, sometimes considered to be internationally important
II*	Particularly important buildings of more than special interest
II	Buildings of national importance and special interest

== Buildings ==
Name and location	Photograph	Date	Notes	Grade
St Mary's Church and wall 52.86080°N 1.13566°W		14th century	The church has been altered and extended through the centuries, with restorations in 1718 and later. It is built in stone with roofs in lead and stainless steel, and consists of a nave with a clerestory, north and south aisles, a south porch, a chancel, a north vestry, and a west steeple. The steeple has a tower with angle buttresses connected by a band at the top, a west doorway over which is a three-light window, clock faces, bell openings with moulded surrounds, an embattled parapet with crocketed corner pinnacles, and a recessed crocketed spire. Projecting from the north of the church is a coped brick wall with iron railings, enclosing a rectangular paved area with a headstone.	I
The Rancliffe Arms; 52.86038°N 1.13484°W		Early 17th century	A coaching inn designed by Sir Thomas Parkyns, it was later extended and converted into a public house. It probably has a timber framed core, the external walls are in whitewashed brick with some stone, and it has a tile roof with a coped gable and kneelers, The original part has two storeys and attics, and four bays, the outer bays gabled with a parapet between them, and there is a two-storey extension at each end, with a single bay on the right and five bays on the left. The doorway has a tripartite fanlight, to its left is a canted bay window, in each extension is a carriage entrance, now glazed, and most of the other windows are sashes, some with segmental heads. Below the parapet in the original part are three circular blind panels.	II
15 Main Street; 52.86022°N 1.13653°W		17th century	Two cottages combined into a house, it has a timber framed core, it is encased in red brick, and has a pantile roof. There are two storeys and six bays. On the front are two doorways with segmental heads, and the windows are horizontally-sliding sashes, most with segmental heads.	II
White House and barn 52.86107°N 1.13592°W		1686	The house is in whitewashed brick on a plinth, with a moulded floor band and a pantile roof. There are two storeys and six bays, and a lean-to at the rear. On the front is a doorway, and casement windows with one or two lights. Above the doorway is an oval inscribed plaque, and in the right gable apex is the date. Attached at right angles on the left is a barn with its gable end facing the road.	II
Outbuilding north of Bunny Hall; 52.86138°N 1.13385°W	—	c. 1700	The outbuilding was designed by Sir Thomas Parkyns, and is in red brick with some blue brick chequering on a plinth with a chamfered band, stone dressings, chamfered quoins, a floor band and a slate roof. There are two storeys and four bays. It contains a doorway and casement windows.	II
Ivy Cottage and walls 52.86025°N 1.13683°W		c. 1700	The house, designed by Sir Thomas Parkyns, is in red brick with some stone, on a plinth, with a floor band, a raised eaves band, and a tile roof with brick coped gables, stone coped kneelers, and orb finials on the kneelers and ridge. There are two storeys and attics, and four bays, and a right lean-to. The doorway has a panelled surround, and the windows are two-light casements with mullions. Attached to the side of the house is a coped brick wall that encloses the front garden. It contains a doorway in the rear part, and along the front it has railings, it contains a gateway with piers surmounted by orb finials, and at the ends are small piers with shaped coping.	II*
School, schoolhouse and almshouses 52.86086°N 1.13502°W		1700	The building, later used for other purposes, was designed by Sir Thomas Parkyns. It is in red brick on a chamfered stone plinth, with blue brick chequering, stone dressings, rusticated quoins, a floor band, and a slate roof with stone coped gables, kneelers and orb finials. There are two storeys and attics, and five bays. On the front is a central doorway with a quoined surround and a fanlight, casement windows, and above the doorway is an oeil-de-boeuf. There are similar doorways and windows in the gable ends. The right gable end contains an inscribed plaque, and in the left gable end is an inscribed band, over which is an architrave and an inscribed plaque, and above this is a cornice and a carved coat of arms. In the gable apex is an initialled and dated plaque.	II*
Barns and archway, Bunny Hall; 52.86148°N 1.13346°W	—	1718	The range of threshing barns and the carriage archway were designed by Sir Thomas Parkyns. They are in red brick with some blue brick chequering, partly on a plinth, and with a tile roof that has a coped gable with a kneeler. One barn contains a carriage archway, another has the date "1718" in blue brick, and the openings include doorways and windows, some with segmental heads, and slit vents.	II
Bunny Hall; 52.86054°N 1.13351°W		c. 1720	A country house that was rebuilt to a design by Sir Thomas Parkyns, with only the north wing surviving. It is built in red brick with some blue brick, partly rendered, with stone dressings and a slate roof. There are three storeys, above which is a semicircular pediment on Ionic pilasters. Rising above it is a two-stage embattled tower with wrought iron railings. This has quoins, stepped buttresses containing alcoves, corner Ionic pilasters, and windows with semicircular or segmental heads and keystones.	I
15 Church Street and cottage 52.86121°N 1.13480°W		Early 18th century	A house, later two cottages, designed by Sir Thomas Parkyns. It is in red brick on a plinth, with stone dressings, and a pantile roof with brick coped gables and kneelers. There are two storeys and attics, and four bays, and a rear lean-to. On the front is a doorway, and the windows are two-light casements with mullions.	II
5 Main Street; 52.86031°N 1.13596°W		Early 18th century	A farmhouse, later a private house at one time incorporating a post office, it was designed by Sir Thomas Parkyns. It is in painted brick, on a plinth, with floor bands, and a pantile roof with brick coped gables and kneelers. There are two storeys and five bays. On the front is a doorway with a segmental head and casement windows. The former post office doorway and window are blocked.	II
Stable behind 15 Main Street; 52.86007°N 1.13642°W	—	Early 18th century	A house, later a stable, in red brick with a pantile roof, coped gables and kneelers. There are two storeys and three bays. On the front are two doorways and casement windows.	II
Coach house, fuel store and wash house, 17 Main Street; 52.86015°N 1.13707°W	—	Early 18th century	The building, designed by Sir Thomas Parkyns, is in red brick on a plinth, and has a pantile roof with brick coped gables and kneelers. There is a single storey, and the building contains two doorways, a fixed light and slit vents.	II
Stable block, Bunny Hall; 52.86103°N 1.13350°W	—	Early 18th century	The stable block, which has been converted for other uses, was designed by Sir Thomas Parkyns. It is in red brick with some blue brick, and has a tile roof with brick coped gables and kneelers. There is a single storey and attics, and a front of 19 bays. Three of the bays have gables with timber framing. The openings include casement windows, a horizontally-sliding sash window, fixed semicircular windows with keystones, doorways, and a semicircular opening in a blocked larger archway. On the front is a flight of steps, and there is a flat-topped dormer.	II
Gate piers and walls, Bunny Park; 52.86549°N 1.11574°W		Early 18th century	The walls and gate piers were designed by Sir Thomas Parkyns. The walls are in brick with stone coped, they enclose Bunny Park, and contain gateways. On the east side is a pair of gate piers in red brick, with two stages, the lower stage projecting and with a dividing stone band. Each pier contains a round-arched niche in each stage, over the upper niche is a panel, and the top is stepped and has coping and a pineapple finial.	II
Cottage south of The Rancliffe Arms; 52.86010°N 1.13466°W		Early 18th century	The barn incorporating a pigeoncote, later a cottage, was designed by Sir Thomas Parkyns. It is in red brick with a splayed base, a raised eaves band, and a tile roof with brick coped gables and kneelers. There are two storeys and four bays. The building contains a doorway with a segmental head and casement windows. The upper floor of the left gable end is corbelled out, and contains 17 rows of entrances for birds and flight perches.	II
Old Water House; 52.85627°N 1.15628°W	—	Early 18th century	The water house was designed by Sir Thomas Parkyns. It is in red brick with some blue brick, on a stone plinth, and has a pyramidal brick roof surmounted by a millstone. There is a single storey, a square plan and a single bay. It contains a doorway and other openings with segmental heads, and slit vents.	II
The Old Vicarage; 52.86149°N 1.13669°W		Early 18th century	The vicarage, later a private house, was designed by Sir Thomas Parkyns. It is in red brick with some stone, on a plinth, with a floor band, dentilled eaves and a slate roof. There are two storeys and attics, and four bays. The doorway is partly blocked, with an inserted window, a blind fanlight with a keystone, and marginal lights. The other windows are cross casements with wedge lintels and keystones. In the right gable end is a two-light mullioned window.	II
Barn, Bunny Hall; 52.86155°N 1.13370°W	—	1734	The threshing barn was designed by Sir Thomas Parkyns, and is in red brick with blue brick chequering and a tile roof. It contains a large doorway flanked by pilaster buttresses, and other openings, including three rows of slit vents. The date and initials are inscribed in blue brick in the right gable wall.	II
Rose Cottage; 52.86045°N 1.13896°W		Mid 18th century	The cottage is in whitewashed brick with a pantile roof. There are two storeys and four bays, and a recessed single-storey three-bay wing on the right. The doorway has a pantile roof, and the windows are horizontally-sliding sashes.	II
The Grange; 52.86105°N 1.13687°W	—	Mid 18th century	The house is in whitewashed render with some stone, on a brick plinth, with chamfered quoins, a modillion cornice, and a slate roof with a stone coped right gable. There are two storeys and an attic, four bays, and a later two-storey single-bay extension on the left. The doorway has a segmental fanlight and six lights in an elliptical archway. The windows are sashes, and in the attic are four hipped dormers.	II
Sundial, Bunny Hall; 52.86017°N 1.13304°W	—	Late 18th century	The sundial in the grounds to the south of the hall is in stone. It has an octagonal platform on which is a moulded octagonal base, and an octagonal shaft with a moulded cap and a copper sundial.	II
Walls and outbuildings, former kitchen garden, Bunny Hall; 52.86324°N 1.13270°W	—	Late 18th century	The walls are in red brick with stone copings, they enclose a rectangular area, formerly the kitchen garden, and are between 2 metres (6 ft 7 in) and 3 metres (9.8 ft) high, the north wall being higher, and originally heated. Against the north wall is a brick lean-to with a pantile roof, a single storey and 13 bays, containing various doorways and windows, and to its left is a carriageway with a flat arch. In each of the other walls is a doorway with a segmental-arched head.	II
Tomb chest, Bunny Hall; 52.86006°N 1.13341°W	—	c. 1840	The tomb chest is to two dogs, it is in stone, and consists of a small square chest on a shallow plinth. It has a moulded top and pediments at the front and rear. On two sides are recessed panels containing inscribed slate tablets.	II
Parish Rooms; 52.86097°N 1.13520°W		c. 1875	A school, later the parish rooms, in red brick, with dressings in blue brick and stone, and a tile roof with stone coped gables. There is a single storey and three bays, a lean-to on the right, and a single-storey two-bay range at the rear. On the sides are casement windows with quoined surrounds, and in the lean-to is a doorway with a pointed arch and a chamfered surround. The gable end facing the road contains a central buttress flanked by cross windows with quoined surrounds in panels with pointed arches. Above is a quatrefoil window in a circled surround, and on the apex is a gabled bellcote with a pointed arch.	II
