= Mansfield Parkyns =

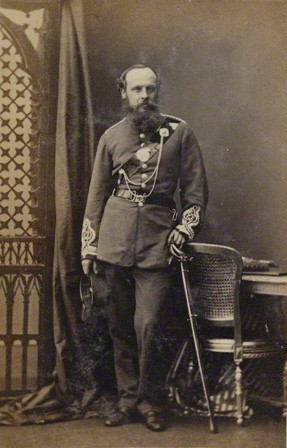
- Mansfield Parkyns photographed by Camille Silvy in 1861
- Born: 16 February 1823; Ruddington, Nottinghamshire, England
- Died: 12 January 1894 (aged 70)
- Occupations: Explorer, travel writer
- Writing career
- Language: English
- Genre: Travel writing
- Notable work: Life in Abyssinia

Mansfield Harry Isham Parkyns (16 February 1823 – 12 January 1894) was an English traveller, known for his travel book Life in Abyssinia: being notes collected during three years' residence and travels in that country (1853). In this book he described his experiences and observations during three years (1843–1846) of travelling in Abyssinia, the modern territories of Eritrea and Ethiopia.

== Youth ==
Parkyns was born in Caen, Normandy, France (while his parents were visiting the continent in 1823), to Sir Thomas Boultbee Parkyns (a younger son of Sir Thomas Parkyns, 3rd Baronet, of Bunny Hall- In 1850, Mansfield's older brother Thomas inherited the Parkyns baronetcy from their first cousin, the childless 2nd Baron Rancliffe.) and Charlotte Mary, daughter of George Smith, of Foelalt, Cardiganshire, Wales, and Edwalton, Nottinghamshire who was from the rising commercial class. As a young boy Parkyns loved wildlife. His formal education helped the development of his drawing and painting skills. In 1833, his father died whilst in Italy. Six months later he left Ruddington to attend Uppingham School (at the time a grammar school) in Rutland; after a short time, his mother remarried, and Parkyns was sent to be educated at Woolwich, then admitted a pensioner (a student without a scholarship, who pays for his tuition and meals) at Trinity College, Cambridge. At college Parkyns was very interested in mathematics and he also enjoyed learning Latin. In 1838, Parkyns's mother died. He did not take a degree, and in 1842, aged nineteen, he decided to leave England and start travelling, going firstly to Constantinople. Parkyns did not tell anyone about his plans, hence for a long time people did not have any information about his whereabouts or status, and he was given up for lost.

== First travels ==
Parkyns spent nine years travelling. From England, he visited Switzerland and Italy; in Greece, he decided to go to the Levant. On Syra, the main island of the Cyclades, he met Richard Monckton Milnes, and they went on together to Istanbul, then to Egypt where they arrived in December 1842.

On 5 March 1843 Parkyns left Cairo alone, bound for Abyssinia. He stayed for over three years, adopting local dress and customs. He abandoned plans to follow the White Nile, and instead travelled in parts of Nubia, Kordofa, and Egypt. He kept a journal which later became the basis of his book.

== Life in Abyssinia (1843–1846) ==
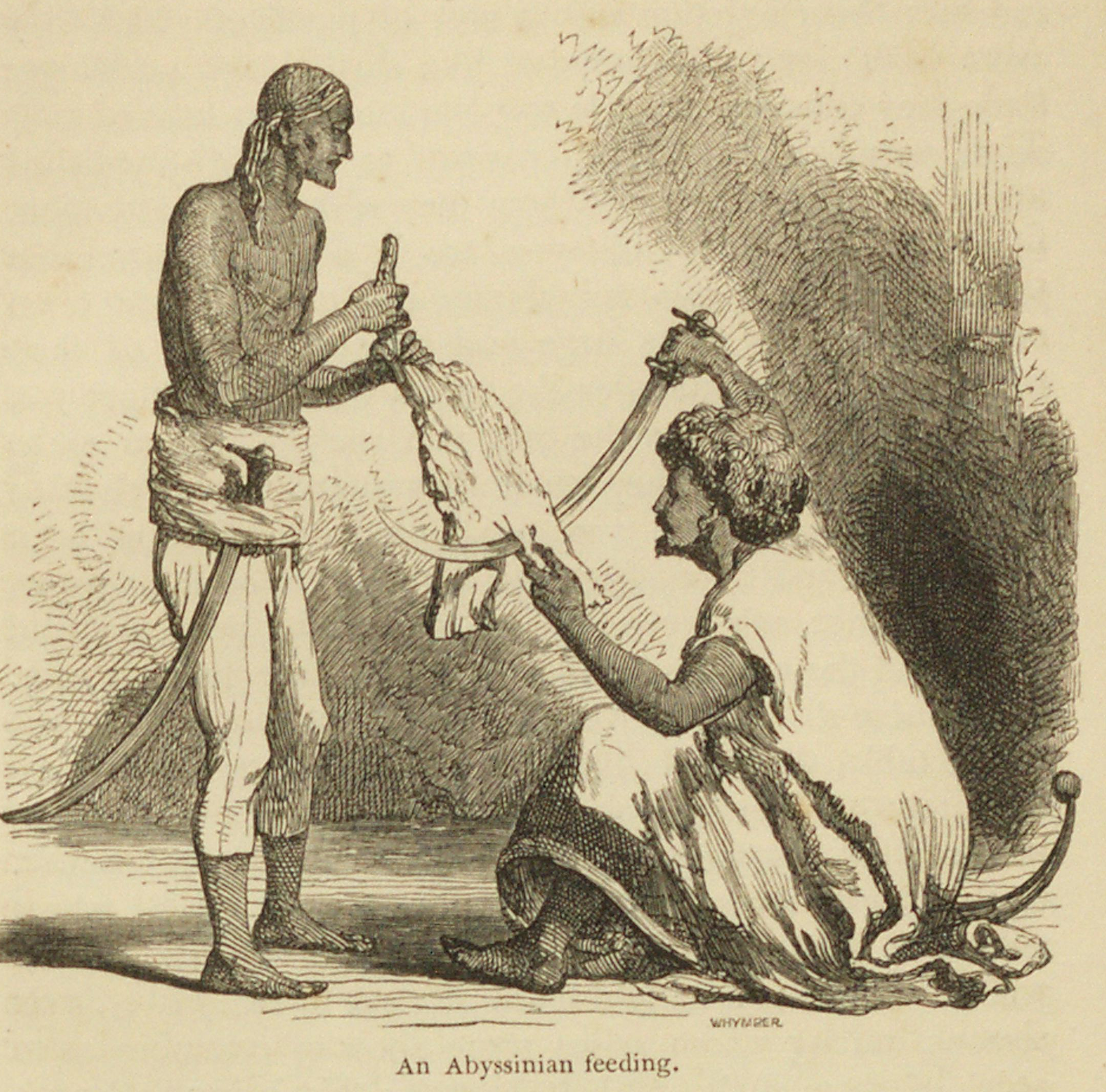
'An Abyssinian feeding', illustration from Life in Abyssinia

Parkyns spent over three years in Abyssinia, which he described in his travel book Life in Abysssinia : being notes collected during three years' residence and travels in that country. The first edition of the book was published in two volumes by the English publisher John Murray in 1853. It was dedicated to Lord Palmerston, and made many references and comments on the quite famous Scottish traveller James Bruce, who travelled to Abyssinia between the years 1768 and 1773. The second edition of Parkyns' book was published in 1868. The author wrote a completely new introduction which had to do with Abyssinian history and methods of government at the time of the Abyssinian expedition commanded by Robert Napier, 1st Baron Napier of Magdala. In short, Parkyns described the political changes which had occurred after he left the country. He was hoping to offer the Victorian reader "a tolerably accurate idea of Abyssinia and Abyssinians"

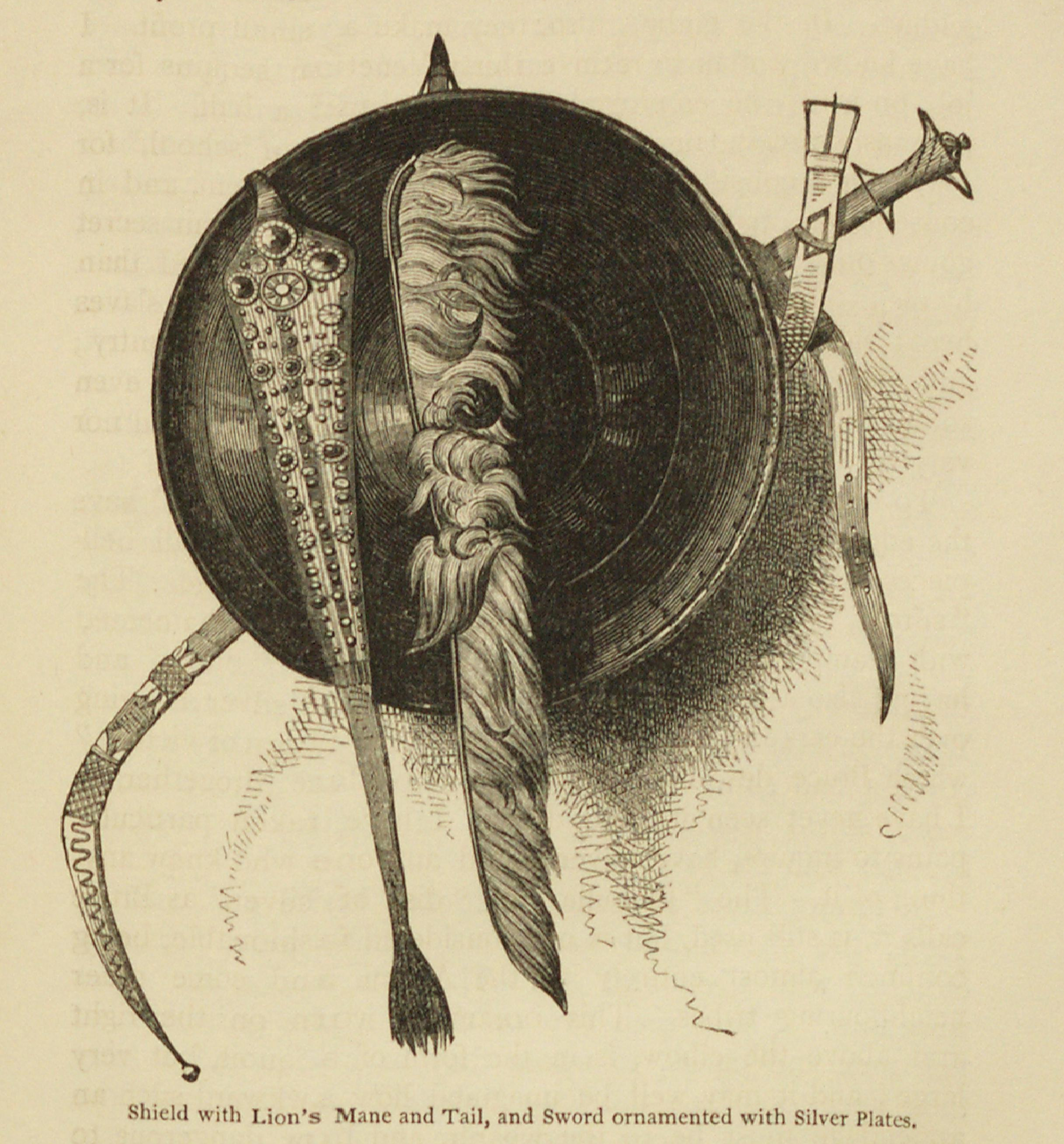
Shield and sword, illustration from Life in Abyssinia

The book consists of 33 chapters which are divided in two volumes. Each of them covers different subjects, including travel, manners and customs. The first volume describes the journey from the coast to the capital and Parkyns's visit to the northern provinces, encounters with others, learning local languages and gaining new experiences. The second volume describes Abyssinian manners and customs, natural history and Parkyns' route from Adoua to Abou Kharraz on the Blue Nile. In total there are 33 illustrations which Parkyns drew himself by using watercolors. A map at the end of his book shows a part of Abyssinia and a part of Nubia to illustrate the journey of Parkyns.

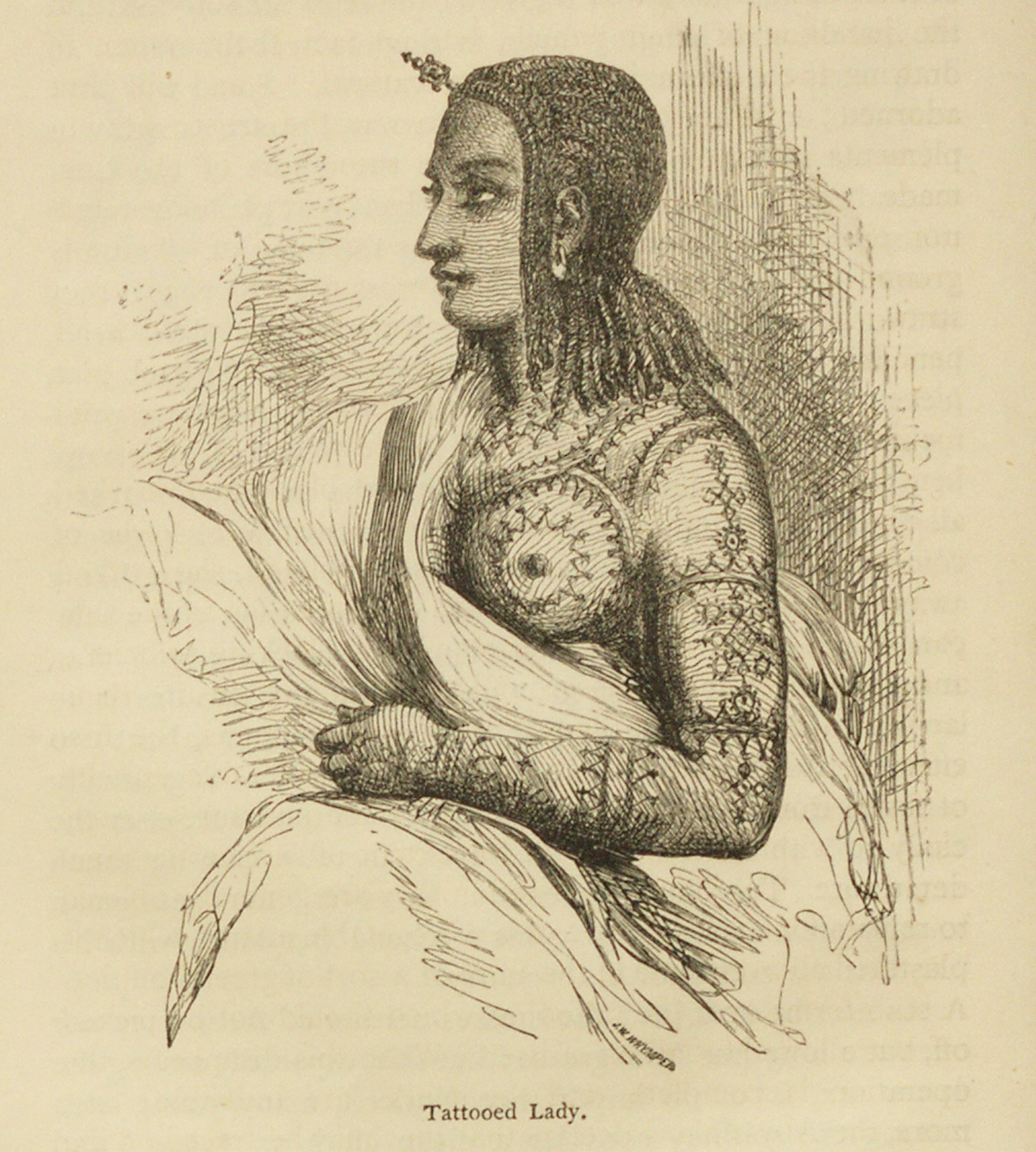
'Tattooed Lady', illustration from Life in Abyssinia

In the introduction of his book Parkyns stated that it is neither a scientific work nor an entertaining one. He wrote that in this book he has described what he witnessed and experienced during his stay in Abyssinia. Parkyns was particularly interested in learning more about the Abyssinian customs but he also enjoyed exploring more about natural history. He especially liked to observe various birds that he had never seen before in Europe. He believed that by identifying himself with the natives, he could attain the best results, thus, as he left Massawa, he decided that he would not try to preserve any European comforts. Throughout his time in Abyssinia, Parkyns wore only Abyssinian clothes, walked barefoot, had an Abyssinian hairstyle, and ate whatever was offered to him. In the book he also described his experiences of working as a silversmith for a year in Abyssinia, and offered detailed descriptions of, amongst other things, Abyssinian manners and customs, habits, personal appearance, dress, births and marriages, deaths and funerals, religion, superstitions.

== Return and later life (1846–1894) ==
Parkyns returned to Europe in 1846. Between 1850 and 1852 he was appointed an attaché to the embassy at Constantinople. He came back to England in 1852 and settled down in Nottinghamshire, where he purchased an estate, Woodborough Hall. In 1854 he married Emma Louisa, the daughter of barrister Sir Richard Bethell QC, who became Lord Chancellor and was elevated to the peerage as Lord Westbury; they had eight daughters. Parkyns served in the Sherwood Foresters militia, and subsequently became lieutenant-colonel of the Nottinghamshire Rifle Volunteers. In 1858 he started to work as official assignee in the Court of Bankruptcy at Exeter and later in London. He presented Woodborough Church with "handsome oak stalls, carved by himself".

Parkyns' wife Emma died in 1877. In 1884 Parkyns retired to Woodborough, where he farmed and established a garden. Parkyns was actively involved in the Royal Geographical Society. He was considered to be "an excellent linguist", as owing to his travels he spoke "most of the lesser known dialects of the Nile basin and of Western Asia."

Mansfield Parkyns died on 12 January 1894, and was buried in Woodborough church with his wife.

== Publications by Mansfield Parkyns ==
- Parkyns, M. (1853). Life in Abyssinia: Being Notes collected during three years’ Residence and Travels in that country 1st edition. London: John Murray.
- Parkyns, M. (1868). Life in Abyssinia: Being Notes collected during three years’ Residence and Travels in that country 2nd edition. London: John Murray.
