= Parkyn =

Parkyn may refer to:

- Benjamin Parkyn Richardson (1857–1910), member of the first North-West Legislative Assembly in Northwest Territories, Canada
- Bill Parkyn (1950–2012), American scientist
- Brian Parkyn (1923–2006), British Labour Party politician
- Richard Parkyn (1772–1853), champion Cornish wrestler
- Robert Parkyn (1862–1939), popular municipal and provincial level politician and tradesman in Calgary, Alberta, Canada

== See also ==
- Parkyns
