= Up Somborne =

Hamlet in Hampshire, England

Coordinates: 51.089339°N 1.433757°W

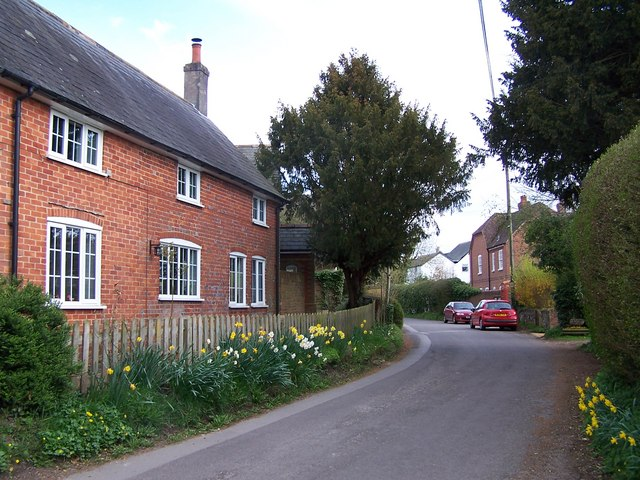
- Strawberry Lane, Up Somborne, Hampshire

- Location within Hampshire
- OS grid reference: SU3975432377
- District: Test Valley
- Shire county: Hampshire
- Region: South East
- Country: England
- Sovereign state: United Kingdom
- Post town: STOCKBRIDGE
- Postcode district: SO20
- Dialling code: 01264
- Police: Hampshire and Isle of Wight
- Fire: Hampshire and Isle of Wight
- Ambulance: South Central
- UK Parliament: North West Hampshire

Up Somborne is a village in the civil parish of King's Somborne in the Test Valley district of Hampshire, England. Its nearest town is Stockbridge, which lies approximately 3 miles (4.8 km) north-west from the hamlet.

The Grade II* listed 16th century Rookley Manor lies within the parish.
