= Bunny, Nottinghamshire =

Village in Nottinghamshire, England

Coordinates: 52.8608°N 1.1358°W

Bunny
- Village and civil parish
- Location within Nottinghamshire
- Interactive map of Bunny
- Area: 3.38 sq mi (8.8 km^{2})
- Population: 715 (2021)
  - Density: 212/sq mi (82/km^{2})
- OS grid reference: SK581288
  - London: 100 mi (160 km) SSE
- District: Rushcliffe
- Shire county: Nottinghamshire
- Region: East Midlands
- Country: England
- Sovereign state: United Kingdom
- Post town: NOTTINGHAM
- Postcode district: NG11
- Dialling code: 0115
- Police: Nottinghamshire
- Fire: Nottinghamshire
- Ambulance: East Midlands
- UK Parliament: Rushcliffe
- Website: https://bunnyparishcouncil.gov.uk/

Bunny is a village and civil parish located in the Rushcliffe borough of Nottinghamshire, England. The parish had a population measured at 689 in the 2011 census, increasing to 715 residents at the 2021 census. It is on the A60, 7 miles (11 km) south of Nottingham, south of Bradmore and north of Costock.

== History ==
The place-name 'Bunny' is first attested in the Domesday Book of 1086, where it appears as Bonei. It appears in Episcopal Registers as Buneya in 1227. The name means either 'reed island' or 'island on the river Bune'.

There has been a settlement on the site since pre-Norman times, perhaps as far back as the days of the Roman Empire. The parish Church of St Mary is 14th century. The most significant building in the village is Bunny Hall, probably built in the 1570s and occupied by the Parkyns family for three hundred years. Sir Thomas Parkyns, 2nd Baronet (1662–1741), known as the Wrestling Baronet, built what is now the north wing to his own design circa 1723–25. He also built the school and almshouses. Thomas Parkyns was a devotee of wrestling and organised an annual wrestling match in Bunny Park (prize a gold-laced hat). These matches continued until 1810. His book on the subject The Inn-Play: or, the Cornish Hugg-Wrestler was published in 1713 and reprinted many times.

The following is an excerpt from a description of Bunny as published in 1813:

Bunny, a straggling village on the high road, containing about sixty houses, and which seems to have been indebted principally for its origin to the ancient seat of Bunny Park Hall, once the property of the family of Parkyns, and now of their descendant Lord Rancliffe. This family have indeed been great benefactors factors to the village, as it contains a good school house and hospital, the former being close to the church yard gate and erected in 1700 for the poor children of Bunny and Bradmore; and the latter having four rooms for four poor widows, and endowed by Dame Anne Parkyns.

== 20th and 21st century ==
The Hall was sold circa 1990, but remained unoccupied and had become semi-derelict by 2005. It was occupied and under restoration in 2006. A small section of the grounds now houses a new group of luxury homes.

== See also ==
- Listed buildings in Bunny, Nottinghamshire

== Gallery ==
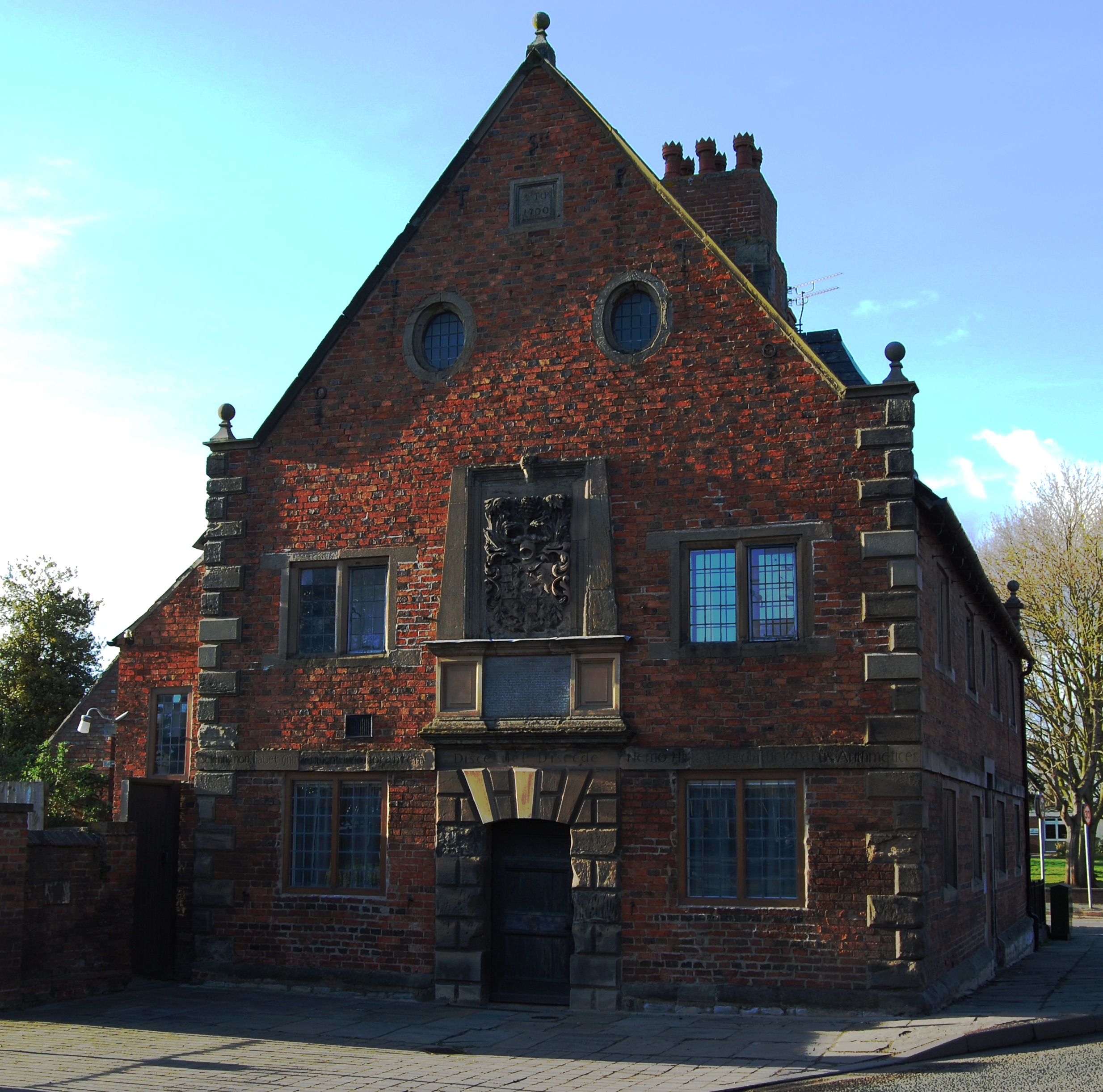
Almshouse

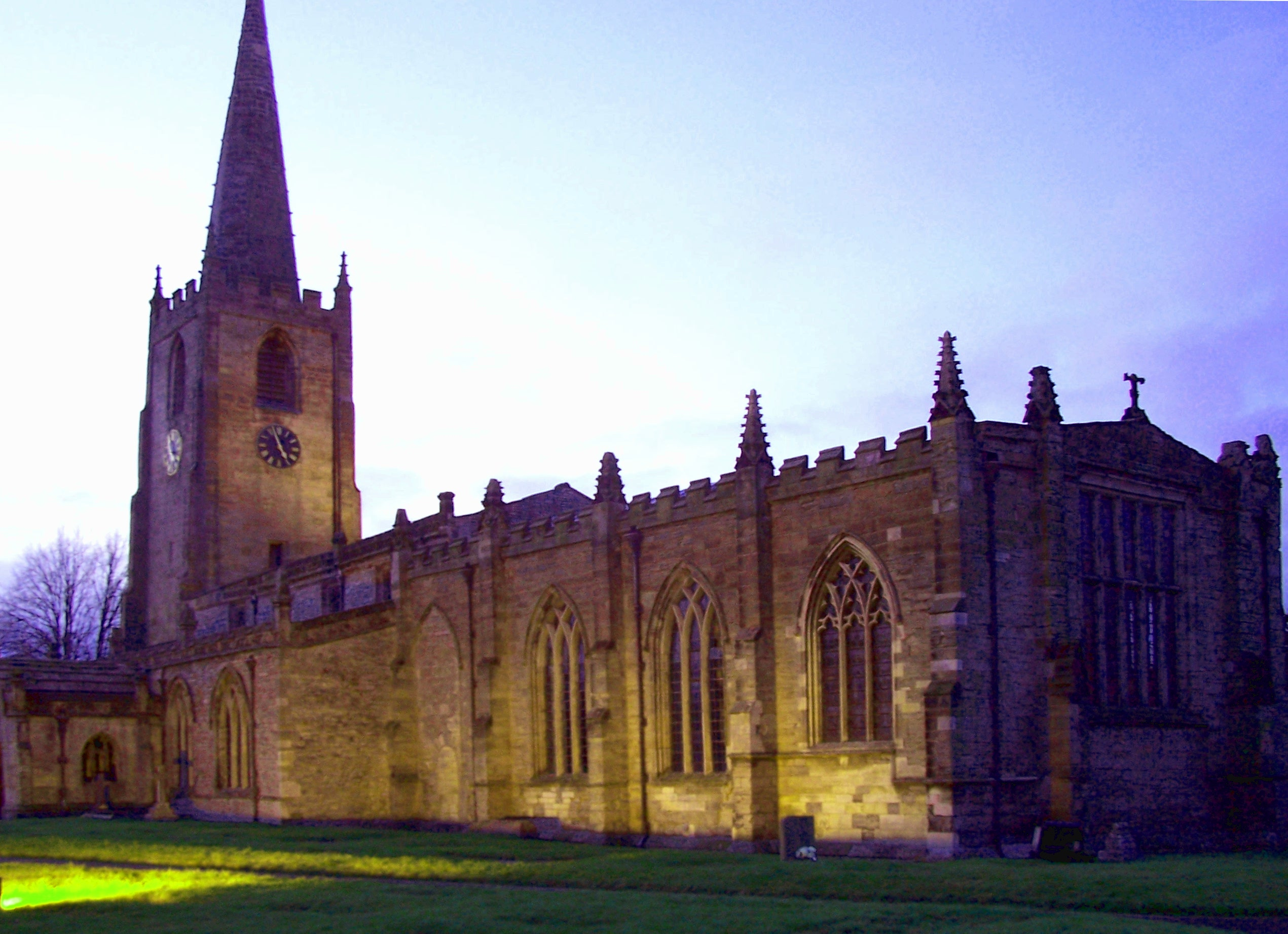
St Mary's Church, Bunny

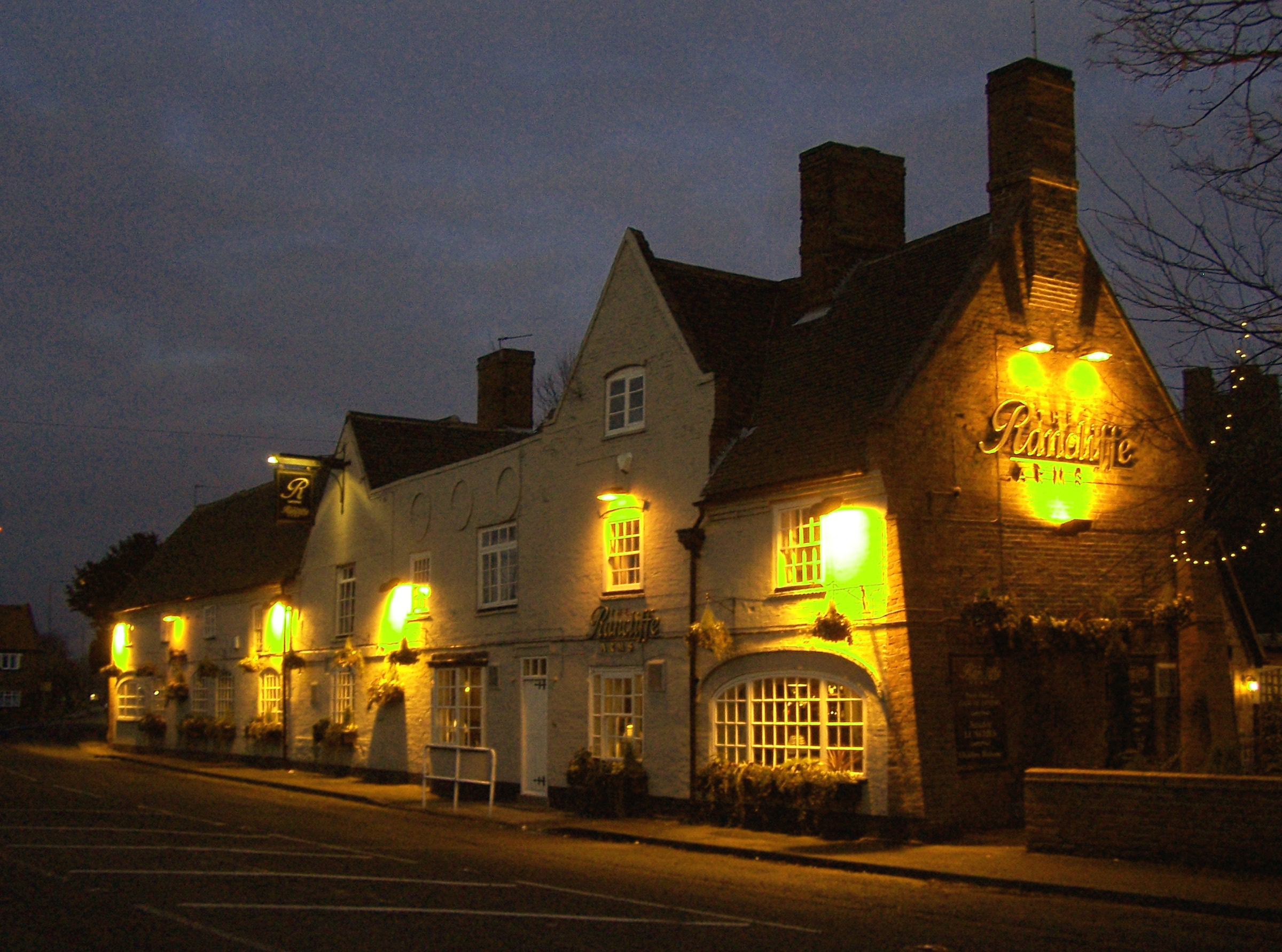
Rancliffe Arms

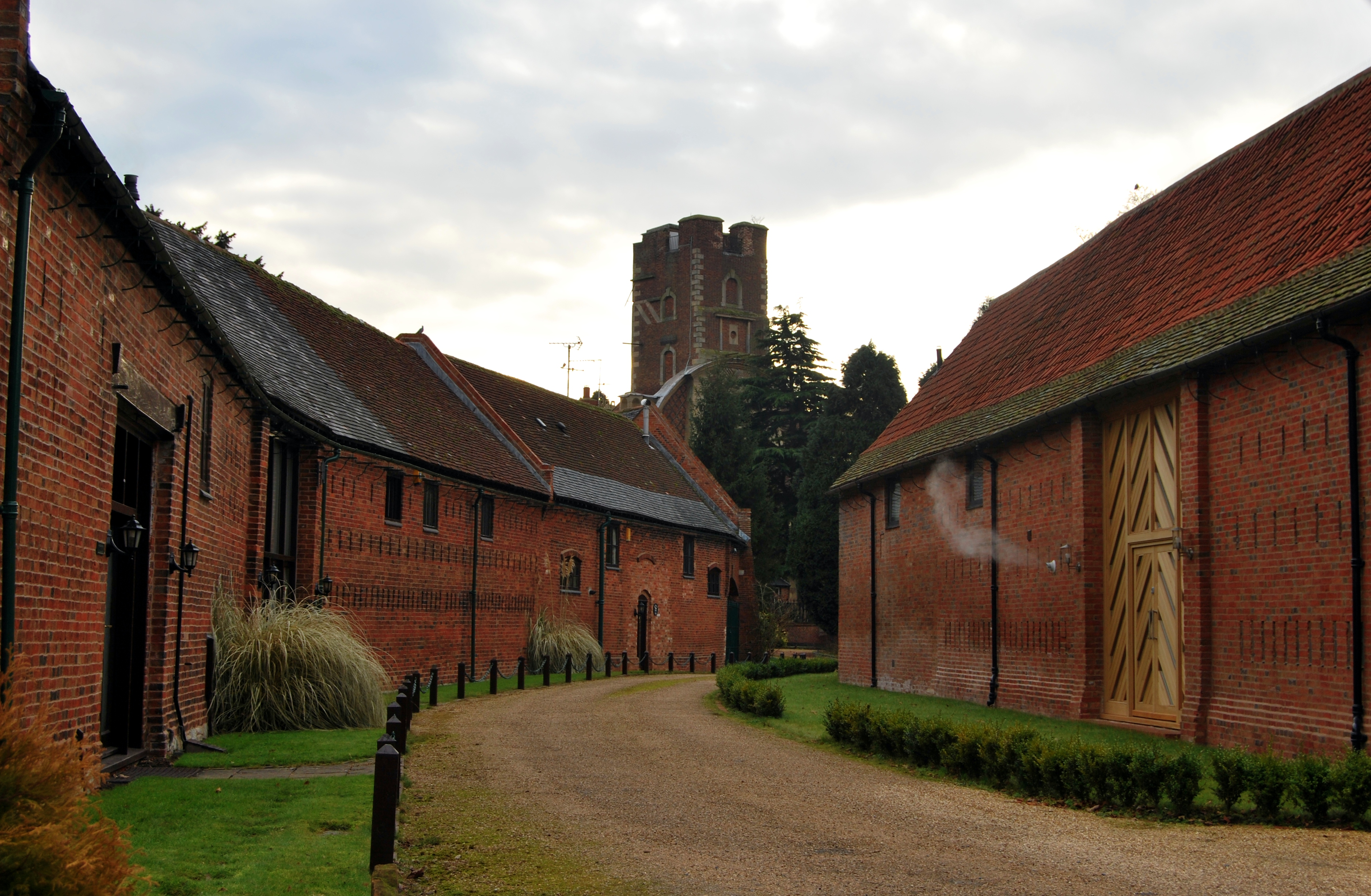
The approach to Bunny Hall
