= Thomas Parkyns, 1st Baron Rancliffe =

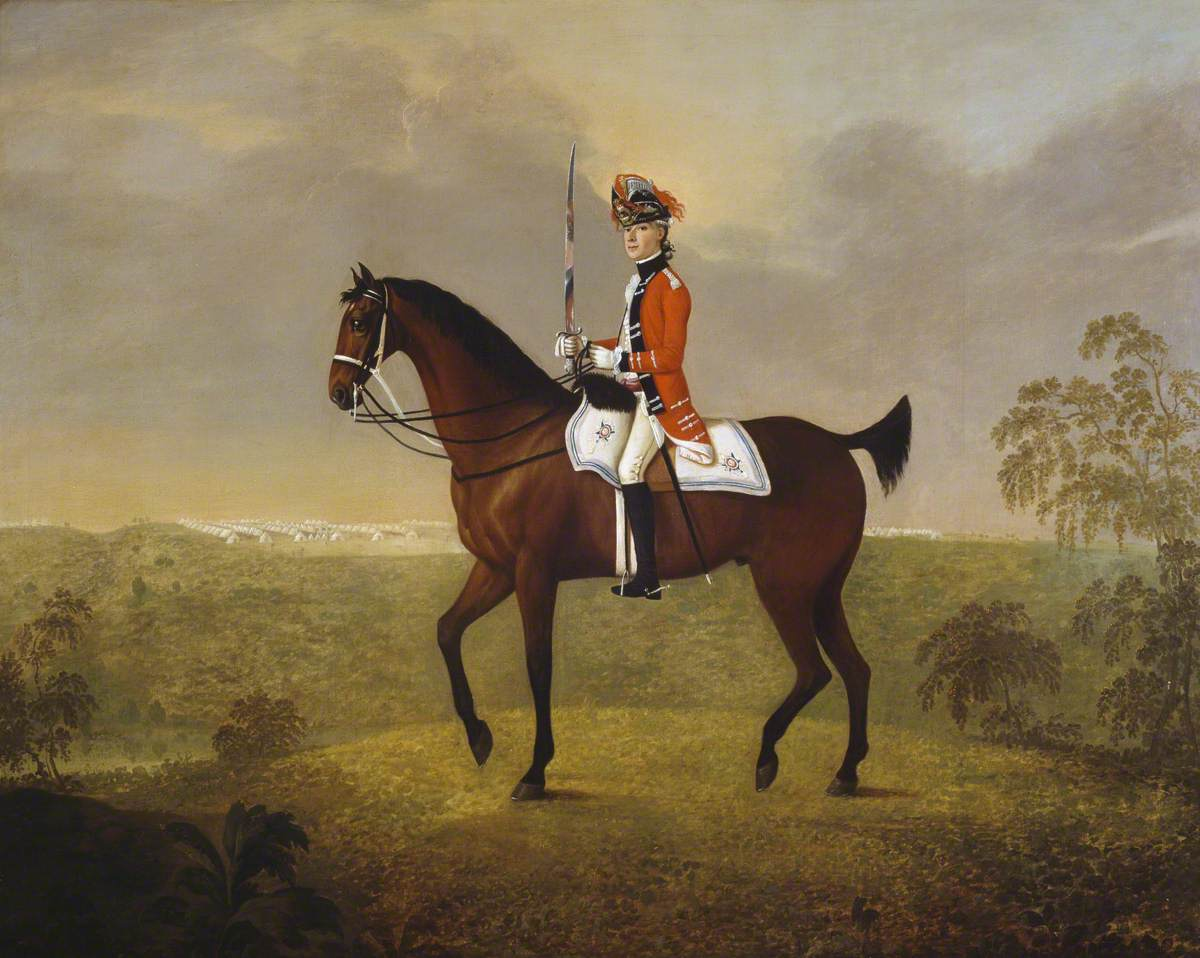
1780 portrait of Parkyns by John Boultbee

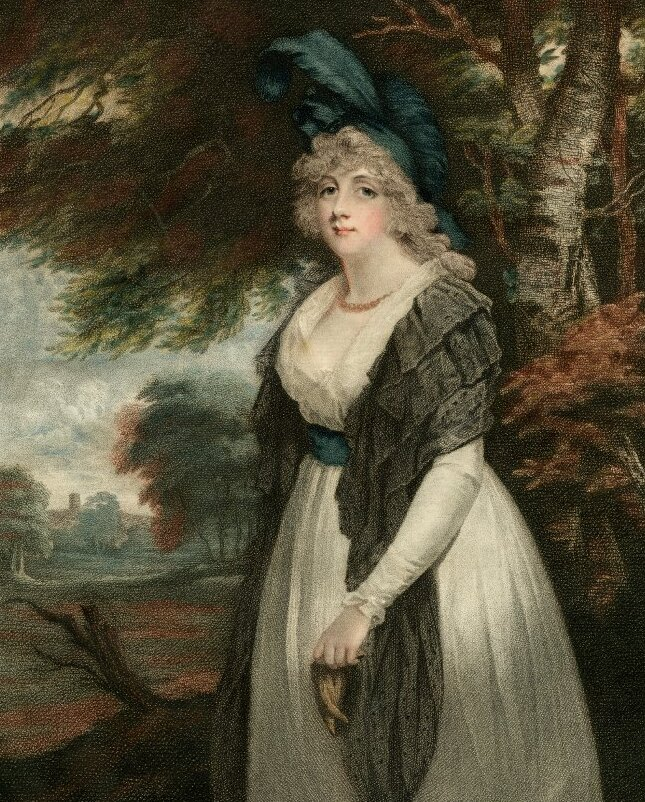
1795 engraving of Parkyns' wife Elizabeth

Colonel Thomas Boothby Parkyns, 1st Baron Rancliffe (24 July 1755 – 17 November 1800) was a British military officer and politician who represented Stockbridge and Leicester in the House of Commons of Great Britain from 1784 to 1800.

== Life ==
Thomas Parkyns was the eldest son of Sir Thomas Parkyns, 3rd Baronet (1728–1806) of Bunny Hall, Nottinghamshire and was educated at Queens' College, Cambridge. He was an officer of the British Army from 1783 to 1790, serving in the 15th Regiment of Dragoons and as an equerry to Prince Henry, Duke of Cumberland and Strathearn, the third son of the Frederick, Prince of Wales. A close friend of the Prince of Wales, he was made colonel of the Prince of Wales Fencibles in 1794. After Prince Henry's death in 1790, Parkyns took over the lease of Rookley Manor, Hampshire until his own death from oedema in 1800, whereby he predeceased his father.

He was elected MP for Stockbridge in 1784, sitting until 1790 and then as MP for Leicester in 1790, sitting until 1800. In 1787 he was elected a Fellow of the Royal Society as "a Gentleman well versed in various branches of Science" In 1795 he was made an Irish peer as Baron Rancliffe. Parkyns was a Freemason. He was a Provincial Grand Master of Derbyshire and of Nottinghamshire, the Grand Master of the Masonic Knights Templar in England, and the Grand Commander of the Society of Ancient Masons of the Diluvian Order of Royal Ark Mariners until 1799.

== Family ==
Parkyns married Elizabeth Anne, the daughter of Sir William James (who died at the wedding) and had nine children. He was succeeded by his son George. His daughter Elizabeth Anne Parkyns married Sir Richard Levinge and they were parents to Reginald Thomas John Levinge. His daughter Mary Charlotte (1792-1864) became Marchioness of Choiseul for her first marriage with César Louis de Choiseul (1781-1823) and then Princess and Duchess of Polignac for her second marriage with Prince Jules de Polignac, French Premier and 3rd Duke of Polignac.

Parliament of Great Britain
Preceded by Hon. James Luttrell; Hon. John Luttrell	Member of Parliament for Stockbridge; 1784 – 1790; With: Hon. John Luttrell to 1785; James Gordon 1785–90	Succeeded by John Cator; John Scott
Preceded by John Macnamara; Charles Loraine Smith	Member of Parliament for Leicester; 1790 – December 1800; With: Samuel Smith	Succeeded by Thomas Babington; Samuel Smith
Peerage of Ireland
New creation	Baron Rancliffe; 1795 – 1800	Succeeded by George Parkyns
