= Sir Thomas Parkyns, 2nd Baronet =

English writer, landowner, architect and engineer

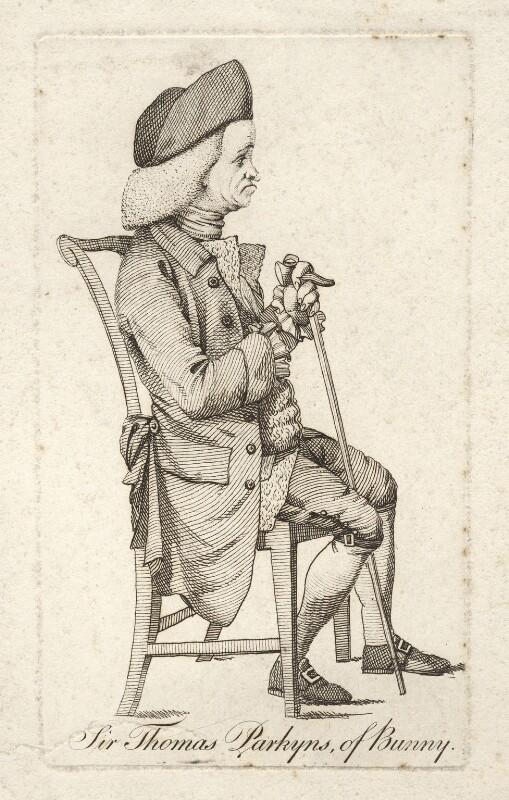
A 1713 engraving of Parkyns

Sir Thomas Parkyns, 2nd Baronet (1664 – 29 March 1741) was an English writer, landowner, architect and engineer who was a prominent figure in British wrestling during the Georgian era.

== Life ==
Born in 1664 at Bunny, Nottinghamshire, he was the second son of Sir Thomas Isham Parkyns, 1st Baronet (1639–1684), and Anne, only daughter and heiress of Thomas Cressey and his wife Elizabeth, daughter of Sir Thomas Glemham. He was educated at Westminster School under Richard Busby and Thomas Knipe.

In 1680 Parkyns entered Trinity College, Cambridge, as a fellow-commoner. At the end of the reign of Charles II, his father became involved in the local politics of Nottingham, opposing as a Whig the surrender of the town's charter. He entered Gray's Inn as a student on 18 May 1682, and in 1684 he succeeded his father in the baronetcy. He was an active Justice of the Peace. He sat on the magistrates' commissions for Leicestershire and Nottinghamshire from 1684 until his death. In 1689 he was High Sheriff of Nottinghamshire.

Parkyns' son Thomas, the third baronet, petitioned in 1797 for enclosure of the manor of Bunny. He had, in 1781, successfully opposed the enclosure of nearby East Leake, where he was a landowner; it was enclosed at the end of the 1790s.

== Architecture ==
A competent mathematician, with a knowledge of architecture and hydraulics, Parkyns was his own architect and engineer. He erected a free school and almshouses in Bunny, and he also restored the large chancel of St Mary's Church, Bunny, gave it bells, and built a vicarage. He rebuilt all the farmhouses, planted the hills with woods, founded an aqueduct and a decoy, and erected a tower at Bunny Hall. Howard Colvin called Bunny Hall "a highly eccentric building dominated by a castellated tower which interpenetrates with a hugh segmental pediment."

Parkyns constructed manor-houses at Bunny, East Leake, and Highfield Grange, Costock: the one at East Leake has not survived. He built also a park wall three miles in length, the first of the kind in England supported wholly on arches.

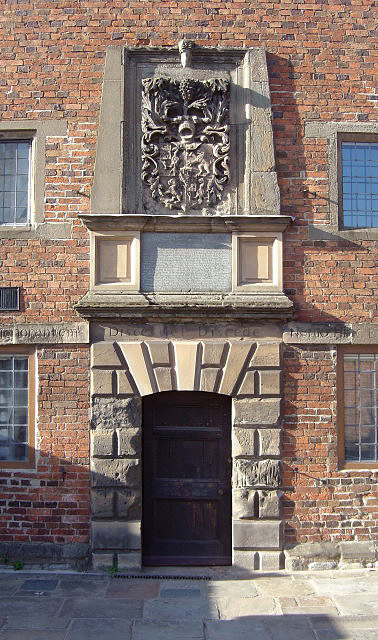
The Old School, Bunny, with armorial inscription

== Wrestling ==
Parkyns established an annual wrestling match in Bunny Park, in 1712. His favourite servants were wrestlers who had given him a fall. The competition that he founded continued in Bunny Park until 1810.

== Death and monument ==
Dying at Bunny on 29 March 1741, Parkyns was buried in the chancel of Bunny Church, where there was set up a figure of him in the act of wrestling. The monument was made by his chaplain in a neighbouring barn; the inscription was by Dr. Robert Freind. It now stands by the north wall of the church, where it was placed in a restoration of 1912.

== Works ==
Parkyns wrote up his notions on Cornish wrestling in Progymnasmata (1713). He recommends to his readers throwing contentious persons over their heads, with practical instructions. In the course of the work he acknowledged obligations to Isaac Newton, for attendance at his lectures at Trinity; and to Mr. Cornish, his wrestling master at Gray's Inn. The work also covered fencing.

In 1716 Parkyns issued A Practical and Grammatical Introduction to the Latin Tongue. It was designed for the use of his grandson and at Bunny school (Nottingham, two editions). In connection with his duties as Justice of the Peace, he published pamphlets and A Method proposed for the Hiring and Recording of Servants in Husbandry, Arts, Misteries, &c. Also a Limitation and Appointment of the several Rates of Wages (Nottingham, 1721).

== Family ==
Parkyns married, firstly, Elizabeth, only daughter of John Sampson of Breaston, Derbyshire, and granddaughter of John Sampson of Hewby, Yorkshire, alderman of London; they had two sons—Sampson (d. 1713), and Thomas, who died an infant—and two daughters. He married, secondly, in 1727, Jane, daughter of George Barrat of York, by whom he left issue his successor, Sir Thomas Parkyns, 3rd Baronet; George, who became an officer in General Elliot's light horse; and one daughter, Anne. Lady Parkyns died in August 1740.

Baronetage of England
Preceded by Thomas Isham Parkyns	Baronet (of Bunny Park); 1684–1741	Succeeded by Thomas Parkyns
