= Parkyns baronets =

Title in the Baronetage of England

- Blazon of Parkyns baronets of Bunney Park
- Creation date: 1681
- Status: dormant
- Motto: Officio egere nolo, I do not wish to fail in my duty

The Parkyns Baronetcy, of Bunny Park in Nottinghamshire, is a title in the Baronetage of England. It was created on 18 May 1681 for Thomas Parkyns in acknowledgement of the royalist service of his father Colonel Isham Parkyns during the English Civil War.

The second baronet was a writer on wrestling, best known as the author of The Inn-Play, or, Cornish-Hugg Wrestler, which was first published in 1713.

On 3 October 1795 Thomas Parkyns Member of Parliament for Stockbridge and Leicester and son and heir of the third Baronet, was raised to the Peerage of Ireland as Baron Rancliffe, of Rancliffe. He predeceased his father and was succeeded in the barony by his son, the second Baron, who in 1806 also succeeded his grandfather as fourth Baronet. The second Baron represented Minehead and Nottingham in the House of Commons. On his death in 1850 the barony became extinct while he was succeeded in the baronetcy by Thomas George Augustus Parkyns, the fifth Baronet. On the death of the sixth Baronet in 1926 the baronetcy became dormant.

== Parkyns baronets, of Bunny Park (1681) ==
- Sir Thomas Isham Parkyns, 1st Baronet (1639–1684)

Parkyns quartered Cressey, escutcheon used by the second baronet

- Sir Thomas Parkyns, 2nd Baronet (1662–1741)
- Sir Thomas Parkyns, 3rd Baronet (1728–1806)
- Sir George Augustus Henry Anne Parkyns, 4th Baronet (1785–1850) (had already succeeded as Baron Rancliffe in 1800)

== Barons Rancliffe (1795) ==
- Thomas Boothby Parkyns, 1st Baron Rancliffe (1755–1800)
- George Augustus Henry Anne Parkyns, 2nd Baron Rancliffe (1785–1850)

== Parkyns baronets, of Bunney Park (1681; reverted) ==
- Sir Thomas George Augustus Parkyns, 5th Baronet (1820–1895)
- Sir Thomas Mansfield Forbes Parkyns, 6th Baronet (1853–1926)

Dormant on his death.

=== Dormancy ===
There are believed to be heirs to the title resident in Australia, descendants of the 2nd Baronet, but so far the succession has not been established. The papers of the Parkyns family and their estate are held at the department of Manuscripts and Special Collections, The University of Nottingham.

Possible claimants in Australia descending from the 2nd Baronet. The possible succession is:

- Edwin Garling Territt Parkyns, possible 7th Baronet (1890–1975)
- Garling Alfred Parkyns, possible 8th Baronet (1913–1984)
- Garling Alfred Parkyns, possible 9th Baronet (born 1936)
