= Bunny Hall =

Grade I listed building in Nottinghamshire, England

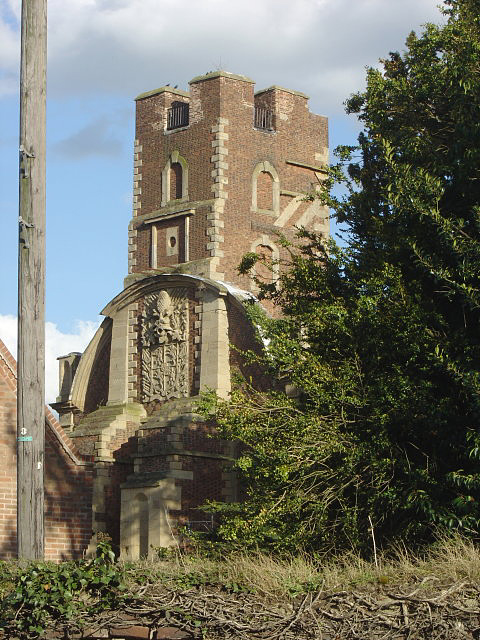
- The Tower at Bunny Hall

- Location within Nottinghamshire

General information
- Status: Grade I
- Type: country house
- Architectural style: Elizabethan
- Location: Bunny, Nottinghamshire, England
- Coordinates: 52.8607°N 1.1337°W
- Owner: Anita Dougal

Design and construction
- Architect: Thomas Parkyns

Bunny Hall is a 21,438 square feet (1,991.7 m^{2}) grade I listed country house in Bunny, Nottinghamshire.

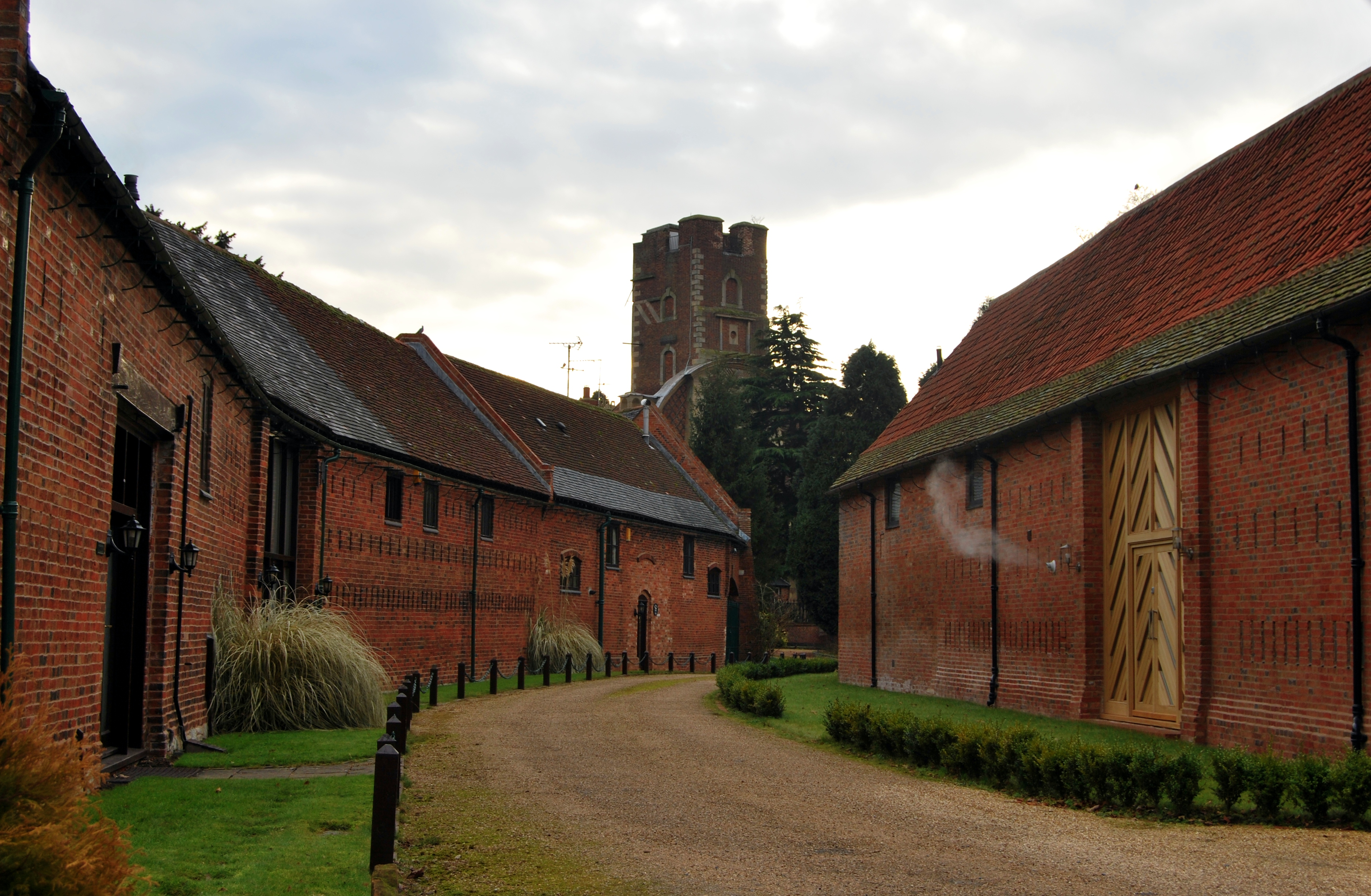
Approach road to Bunny Hall

The house was originally an Elizabethan red brick house with an 80 foot high tower. The house was rebuilt in 1720 by Sir Thomas Parkyns, 2nd Baronet and now stands in 14.5 acres (5.9 ha) of formal gardens and parkland. It has been equipped with a cinema room and a leisure area equipped with gymnasium, steam and sauna rooms, a large indoor heated pool and separate Jacuzzi and spa area. There is also a large orangery, drawing room, library and a circular glazed frosted dome allowing light to illuminate the hallway and staircase.

The hall is listed Grade I on the National Heritage List for England. Several buildings and structures associated with the hall are listed Grade II; these include the stable block, an out building to the north, a barn dating from 1734, the carriage archway and barns, and the garden walls and garden outbuildings, and the gate piers and walls around the park.

A chest tomb near the hall and the sundial are also Grade II listed.

== History ==
The manor of Bunny was acquired as a dowry by Richard Parkyns when he married Elizabeth Barlowe in the 1570s, and it is believed he built the original hall. Successive generations of the Parkyns family were to live there until 1850. After the English Civil War the owner at the time, Thomas Parkyns, was elevated to the baronetage in recognition of the family's support for the throne. In 1720 the buildings were greatly renovated by Thomas Parkyn, 2nd Baronet. Further extensive re-modelling of the Hall was carried out between 1826 and 1835. In 1850 the Parkyns lineage failed and the estate was bequeathed to Mrs Burt, the housekeeper who in turn left it to the Levinge family. They sold the whole estate to Sir Albert Ball, the Mayor of Nottingham who quickly passed it on to the Cordeux family. During World War II the estate and hall were bought by Bertie Edwards, whose son moved out and renovated the building.

It was bought in 2000 by the family of Chek Whyte, and in 2009 was for sale at a price in excess of £3 million.

After his very public fall from grace, with a £32m debt, Chek Whyte sold Bunny Hall to Anita Dougal in 2021.

== See also ==
- Grade I listed buildings in Nottinghamshire
- Listed buildings in Bunny, Nottinghamshire
