= Styles of wrestling =

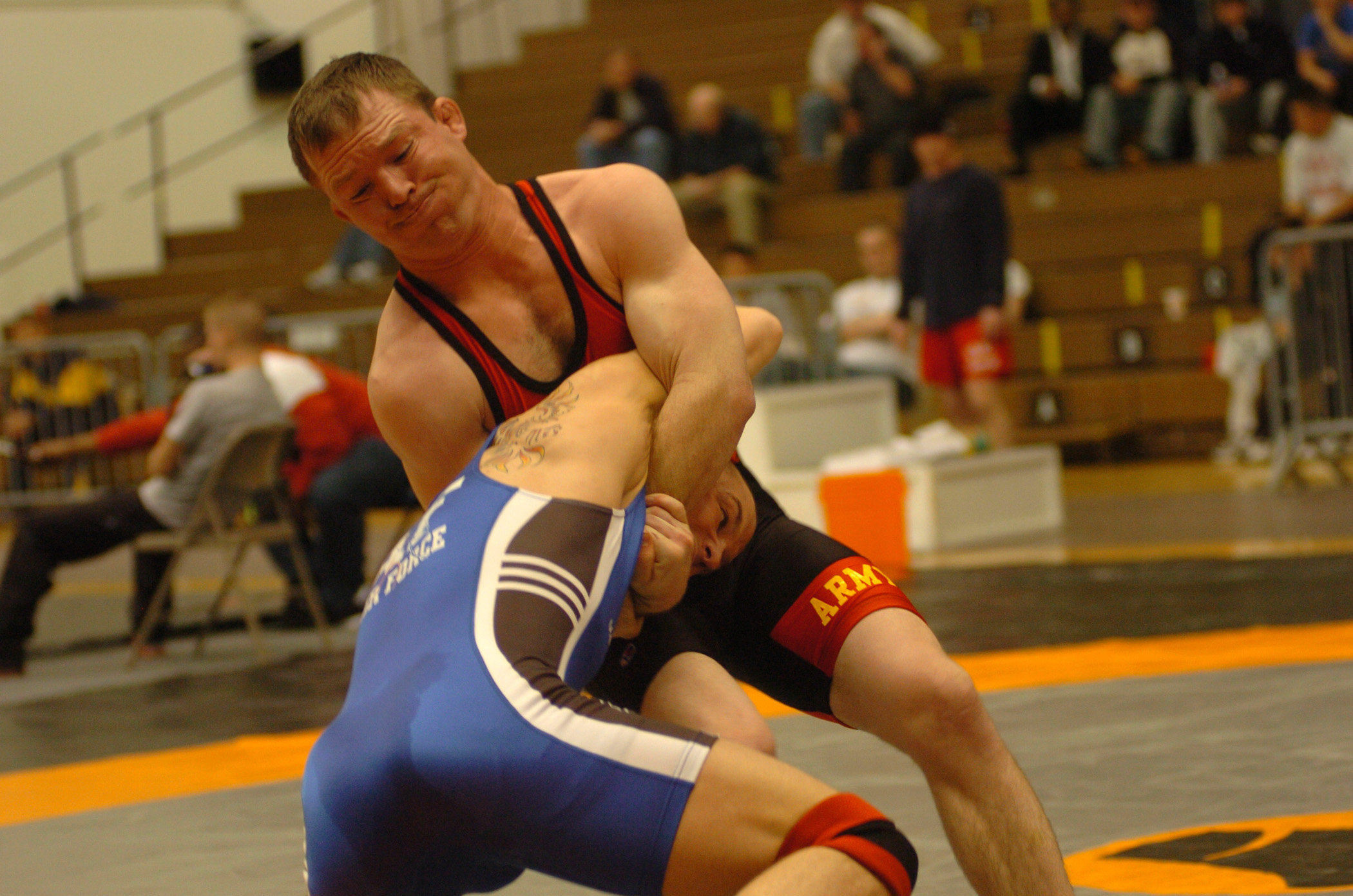
Loose style wrestling: wrestling without a belt

Styles of wrestling may be classified in various ways, such as:

- Loose style wrestling
- Belt wrestling
- Jacket wrestling

== By technique ==
- Category:Grappling hold
- Cornish wrestling throws

== Historical styles ==
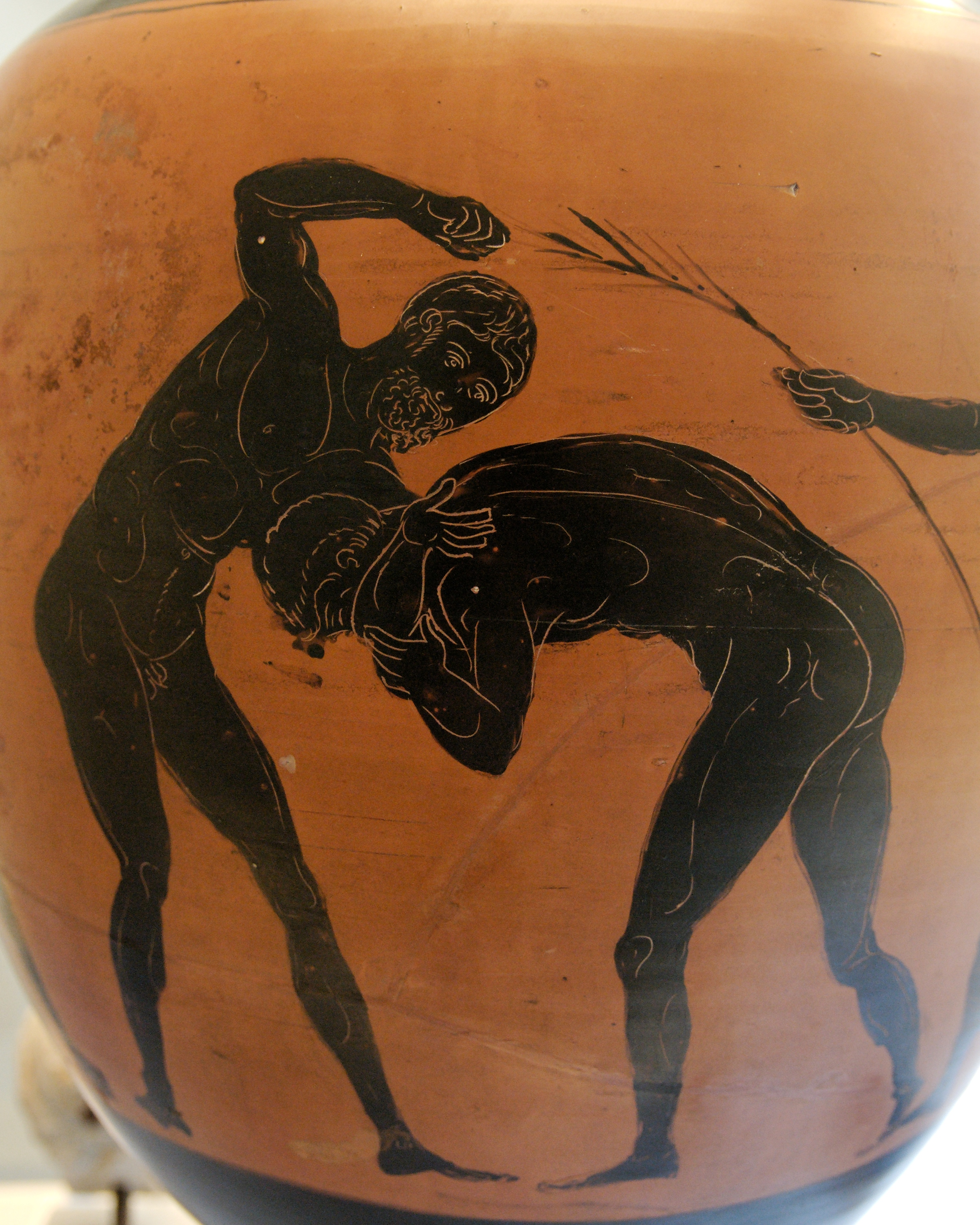
Ancient Pankration

Important historical styles include:

- Pankration – mixing boxing and wrestling, and a sport in the original Olympic Games
- Greek wrestling
- Lancashire wrestling
- Devon wrestling

== Modern wrestling by operation styles ==
In the modern era, styles of operating a wrestling match could be classified thus, although it is not a style of wrestling itself:

- Amateur sports
- Professional sports and Sports entertainment

Some styles exist or have existed in more than one of these three broad categories. Where this is the case and an article exists, it may appear in and be linked to from two or more of the lists below.

But this is not a classification by styles of wrestling. This is classification of its operation as a business.

Note particularly that the phrase professional wrestling normally refers to sports entertainment, but can also refer to the professional level of wrestling as a competitive sport.

=== Amateur competitive wrestling ===
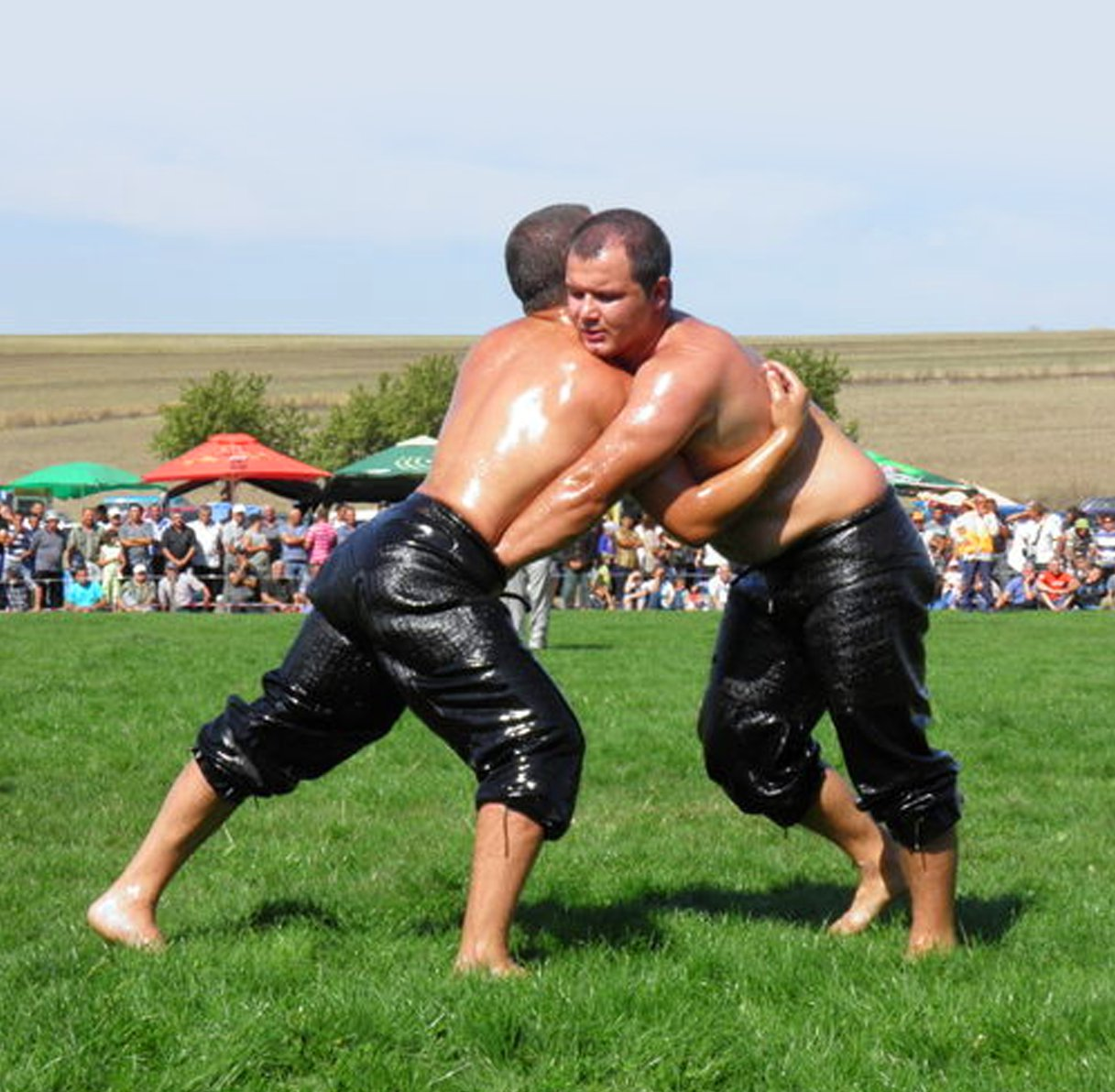
Bulgarian oil wrestling

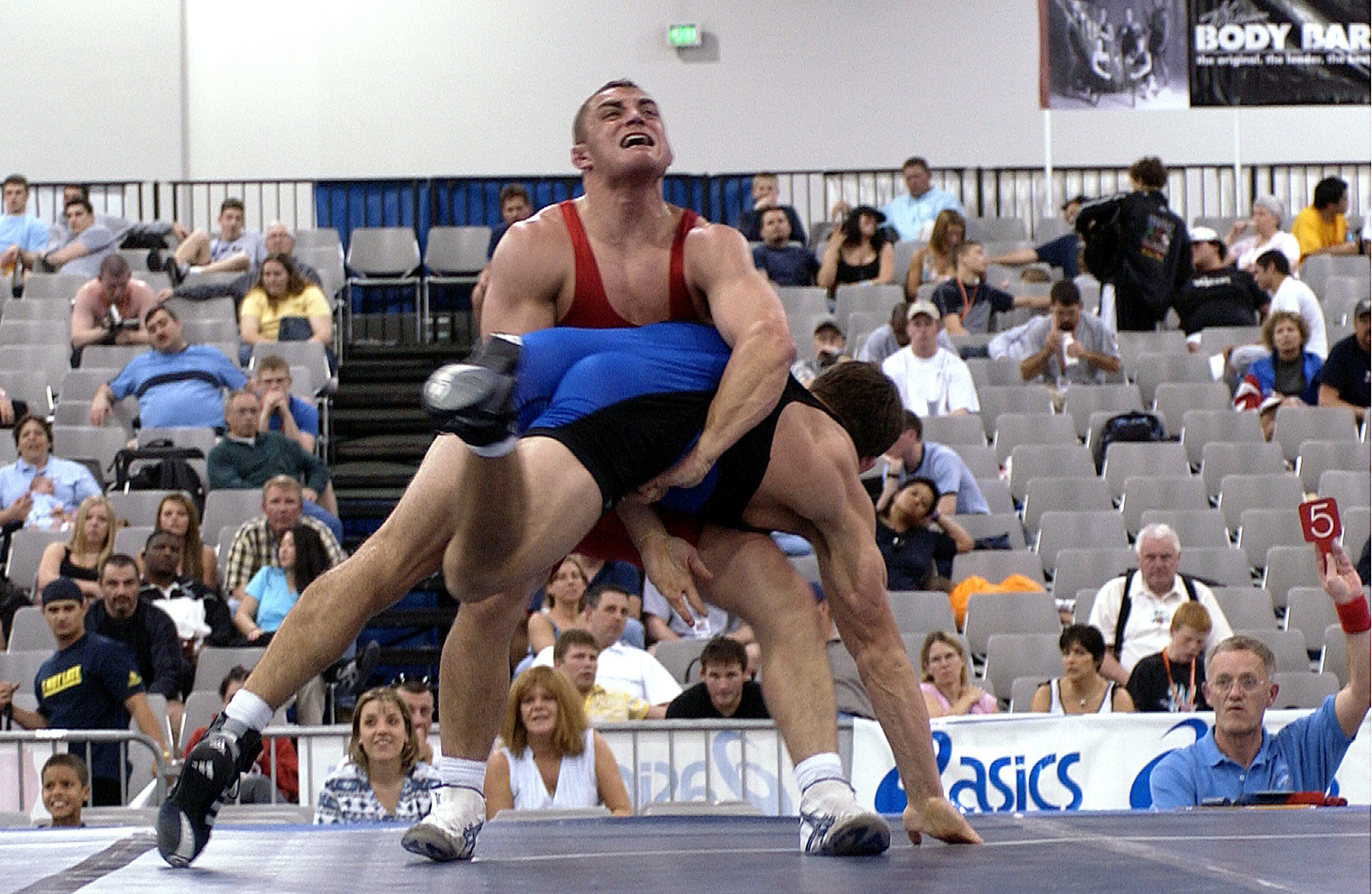
A competitor at national level Greco-Roman wrestling tournament attempting five point throw for lifting his opponent off the mat in reverse body lock clinch

- Two styles of wrestling have been included in the modern Summer Olympics:
  - Greco-Roman wrestling
  - Freestyle wrestling
- Shuai jiao – covering several jacket wrestling styles of China
- Folk wrestling (see also Category:Folk wrestling styles)
  - Kurash
  - Kokh – Armenian type of wrestling
  - Khuresh
  - Mongolian wrestling
  - Oil wrestling – the national sport of Turkey
  - Schwingen – in Switzerland
  - Ssireum – the national sport of Korea
  - Collar-and-elbow
  - Cornish wrestling
  - Cumberland and Westmorland wrestling
  - Scottish Backhold
- Collegiate wrestling – in the United States
- Sambo (martial art) – in Russia
- Luta Livre – in Brazil, similar to Brazilian Jiu Jitsu, but without the gi
- Submission wrestling - often similar to no-gi Brazilian jiu-jitsu, this type of grappling exists in many distinct styles, and the use of a gi depends on the specific style.
- Amateur pankration – a modern recreation of the ancient Olympic sport

=== Professional competitive wrestling ===
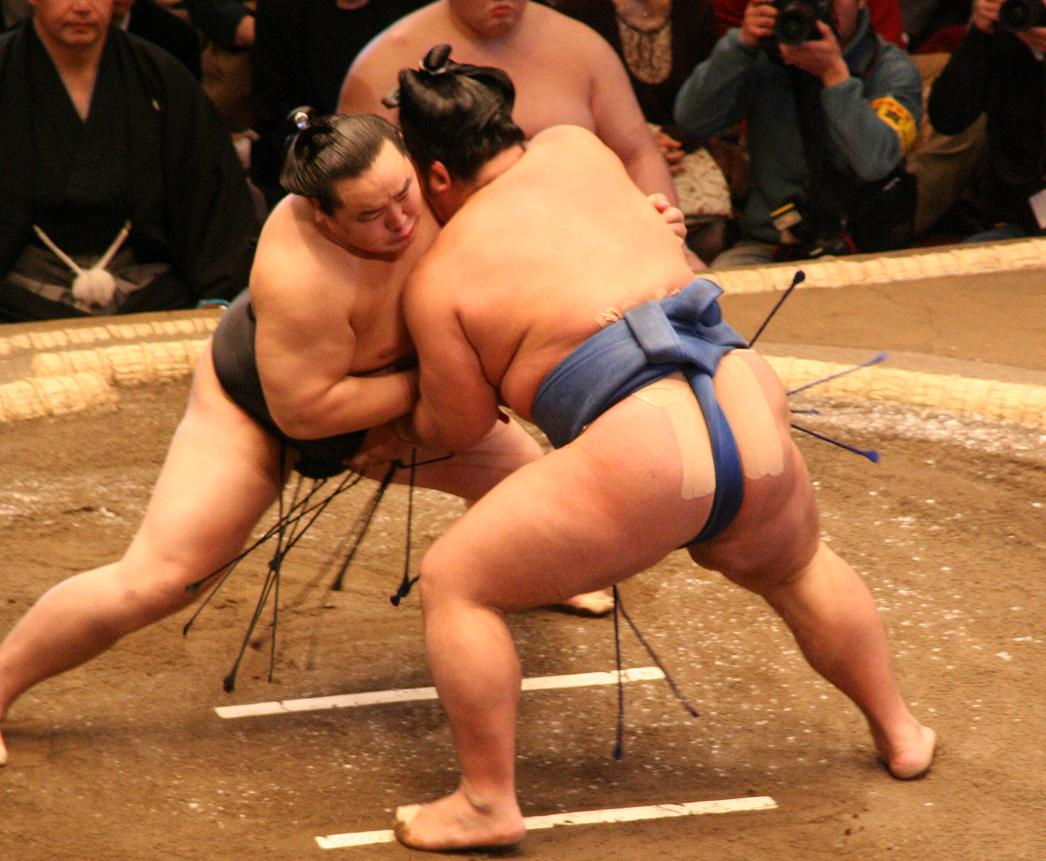
Sumo, a kind of belt wrestling

- Sumo – in Japan is the most popular form of competitive wrestling at a professional level
- Lucha libre – was once a competitive sport, but is now sports entertainment
- Catch-as-Catch-Can

=== Modern sports entertainment ===
The term sports entertainment was coined to describe the sport's spectacles promoted by World Wrestling Entertainment (WWE). These matches are not competitive, but are a scripted and rehearsed entertainment.

The rules are not always clear and are generally ignored in any case. The term is now used to describe all staged wrestling matches and similar versions of other sports.

In the context of sports entertainment, the term professional wrestling is used both to mean all staged forms of wrestling, and also more specifically for those of the particular style developed by WWE.

- Professional wrestling – mainly in the USA but also in Japan
- King's Road style – in Japan
- Strong style – in Japan
- Lucha Libre – particularly in Mexico, but also in other Spanish-speaking countries
- Hardcore wrestling - popularized by FMW and ECW
- Erotic wrestling - in promotions such as NWWL
- Backyard wrestling – fan imitation

See also:

- Kayfabe – the open secret that these matches are predetermined
- Professional wrestling promotion
- List of professional wrestling promotions
- Independent circuit
Wrestling as sports entertainment

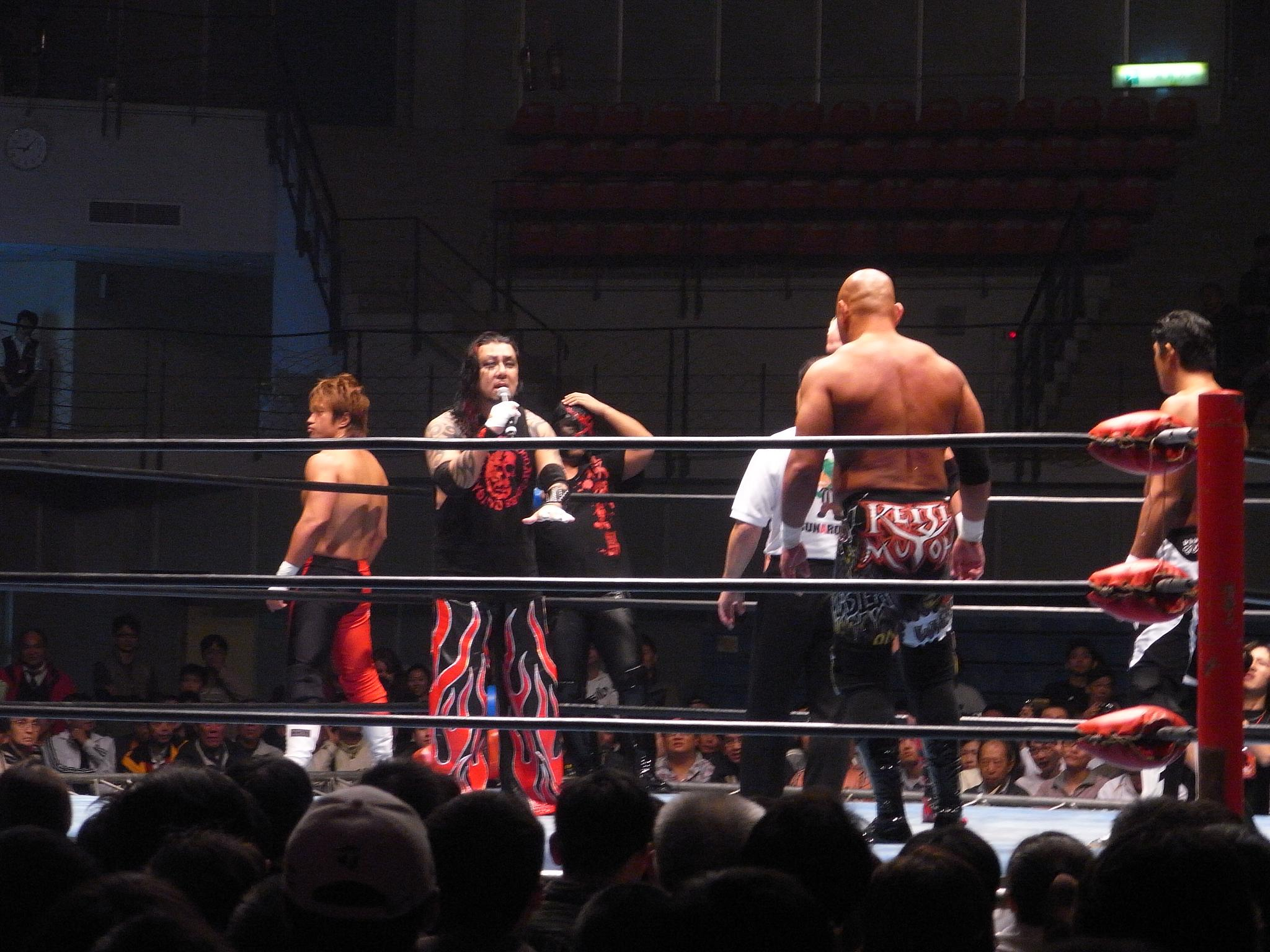

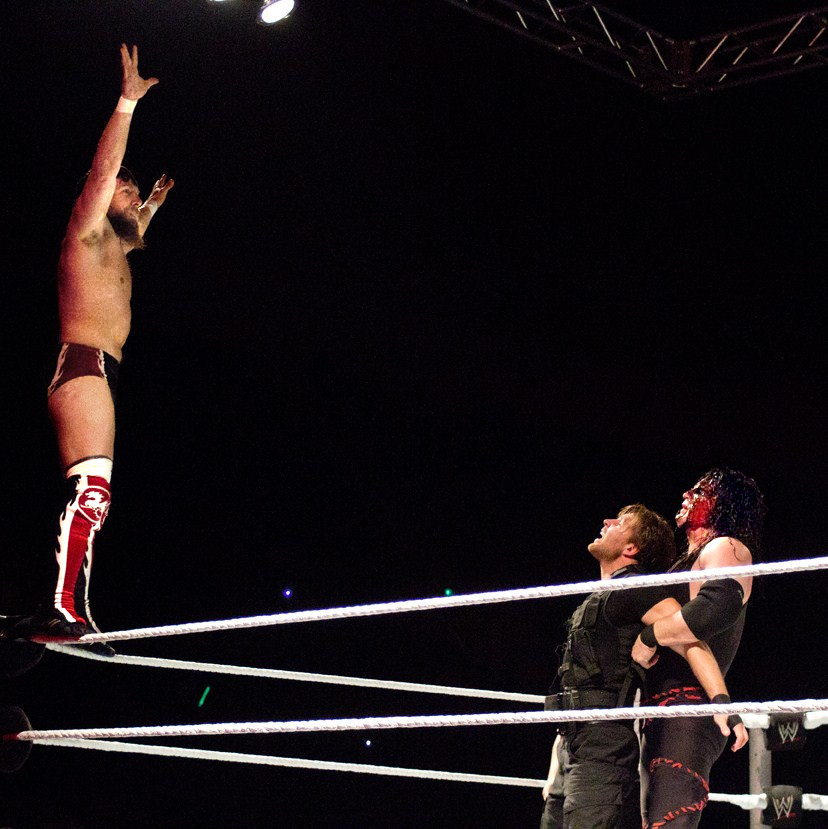

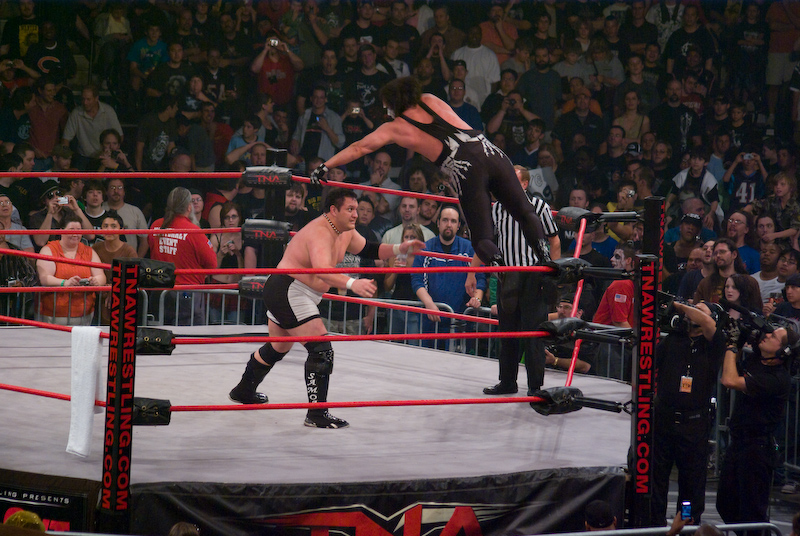

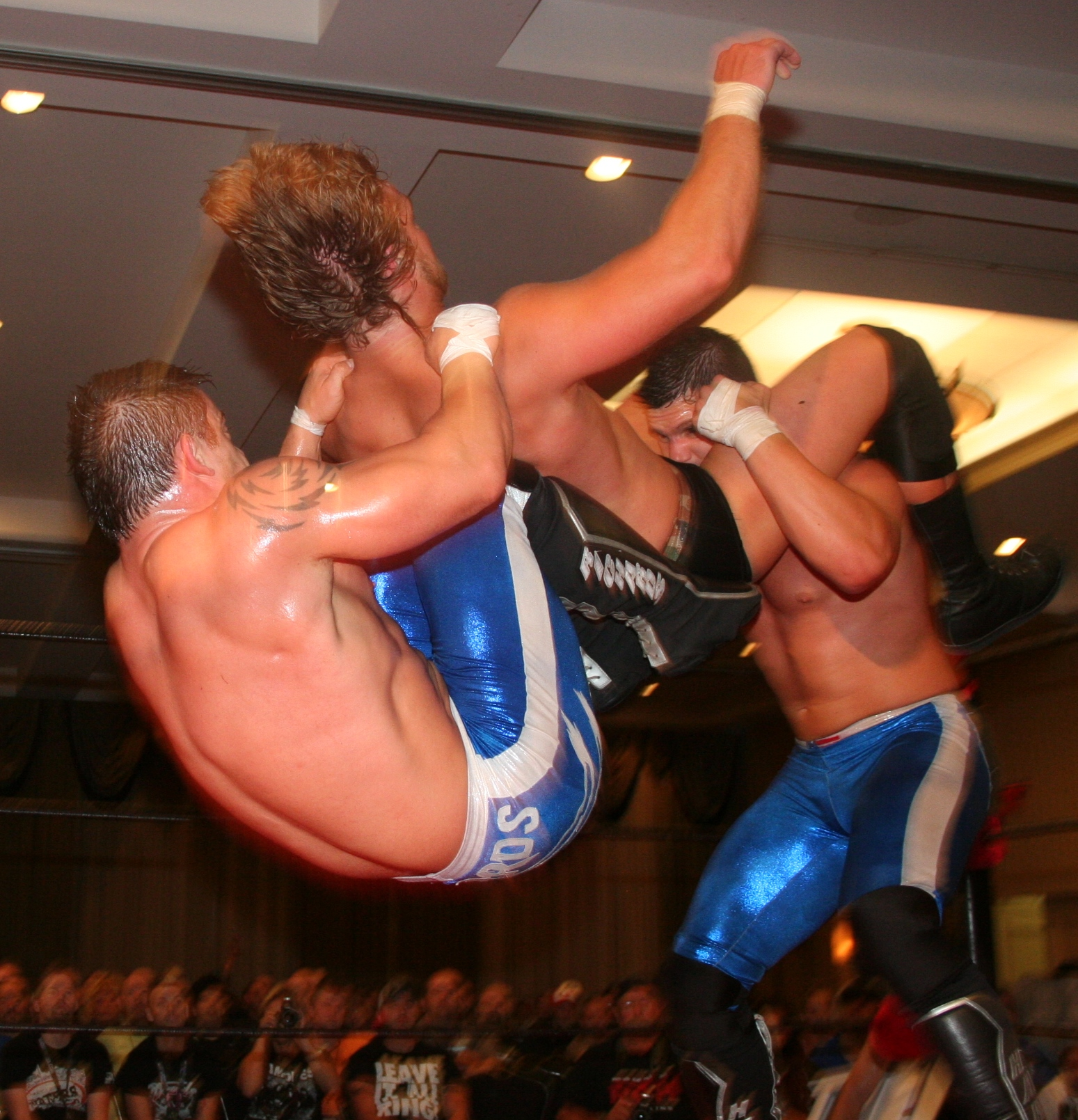

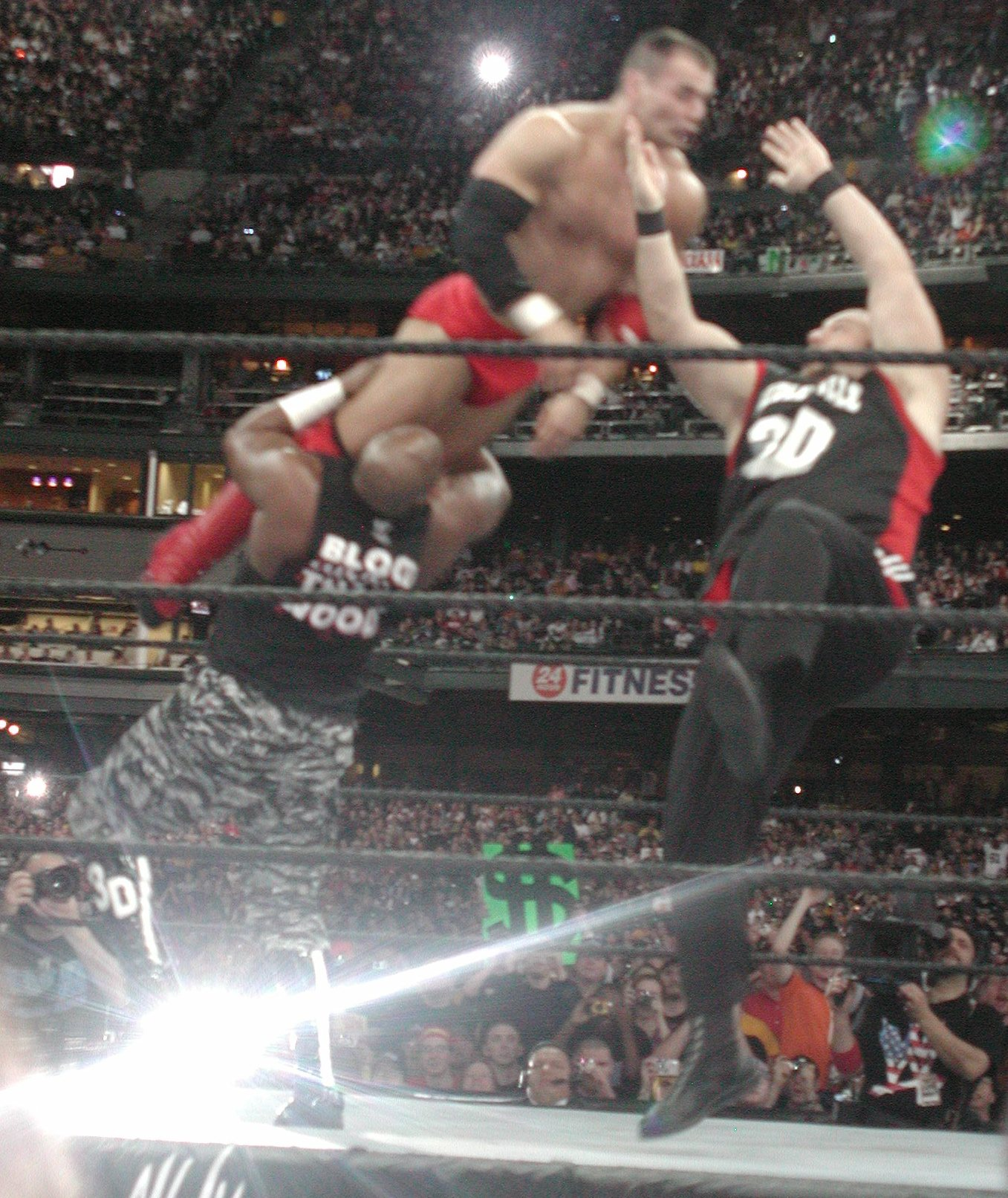
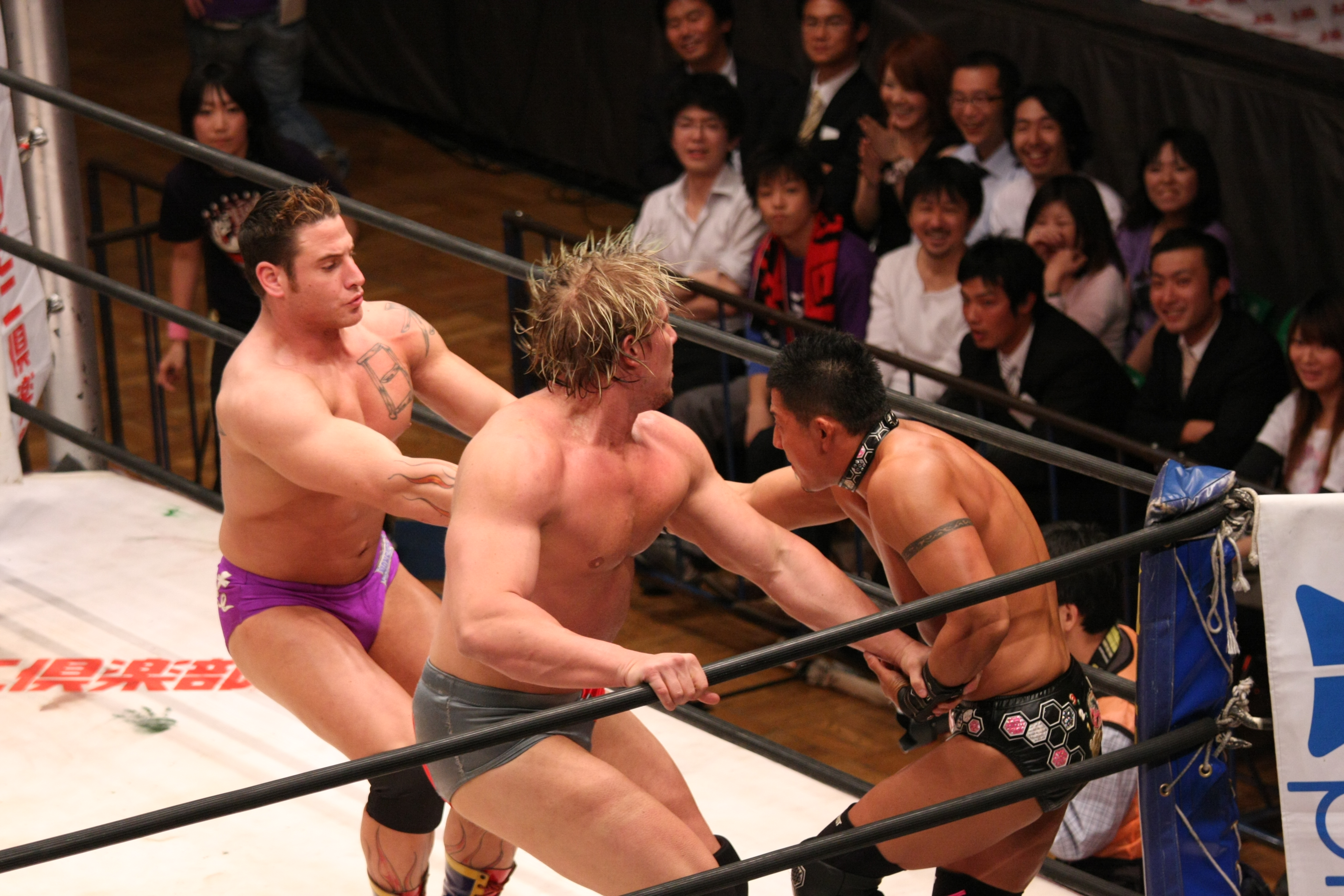

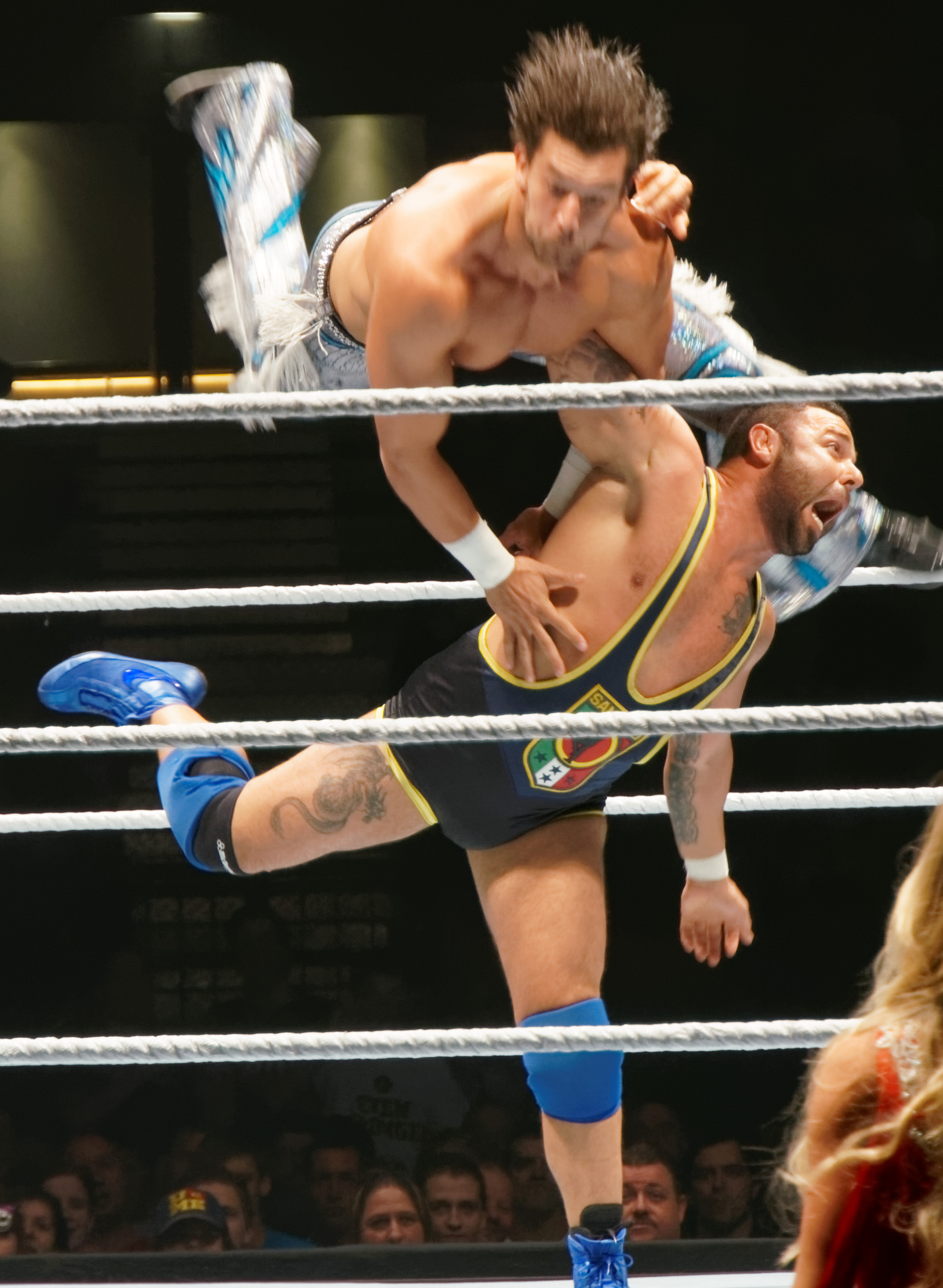

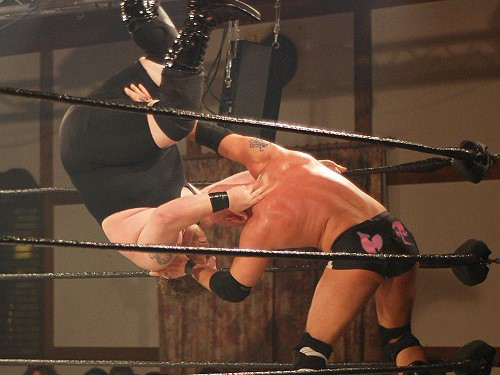

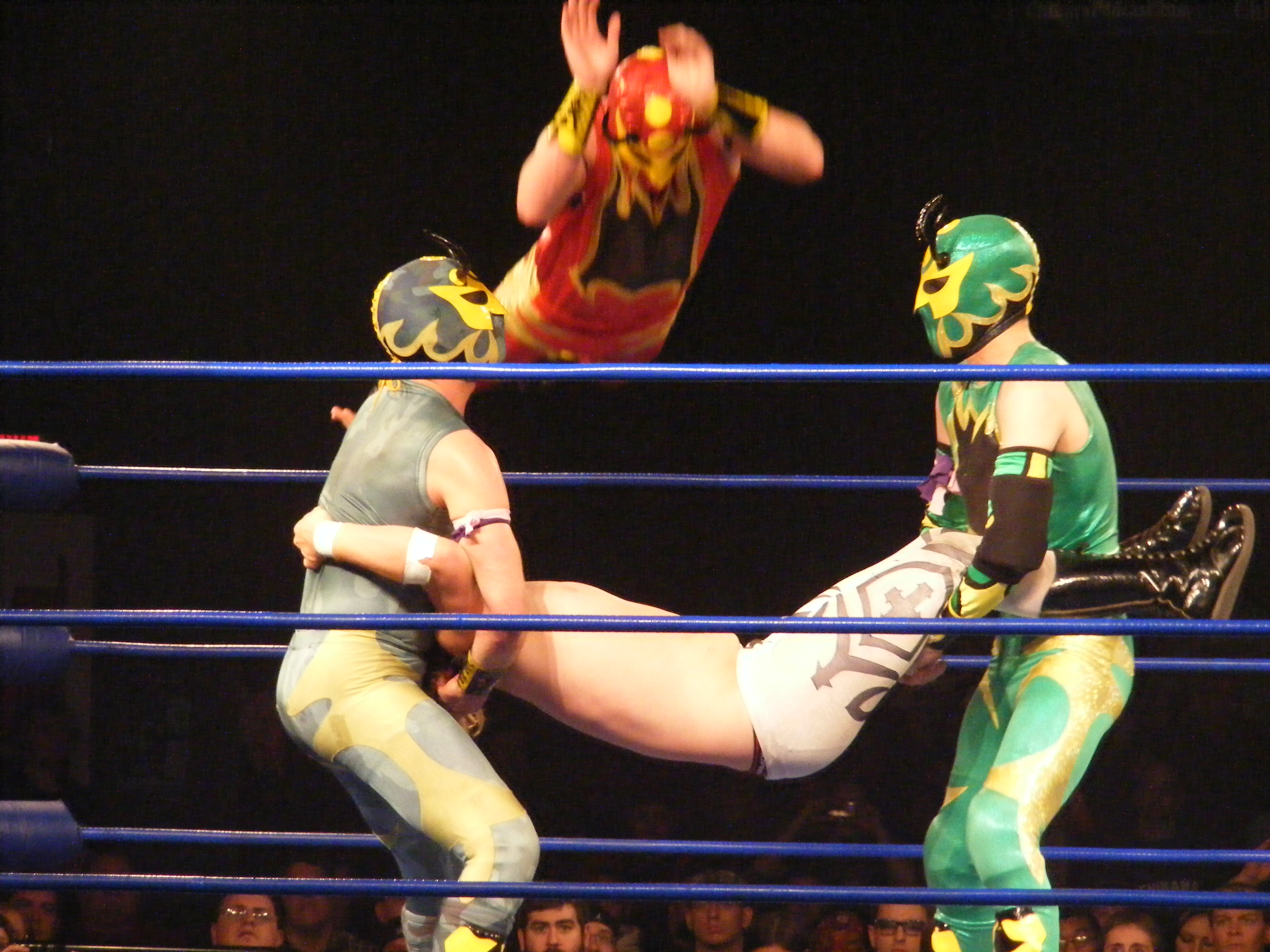

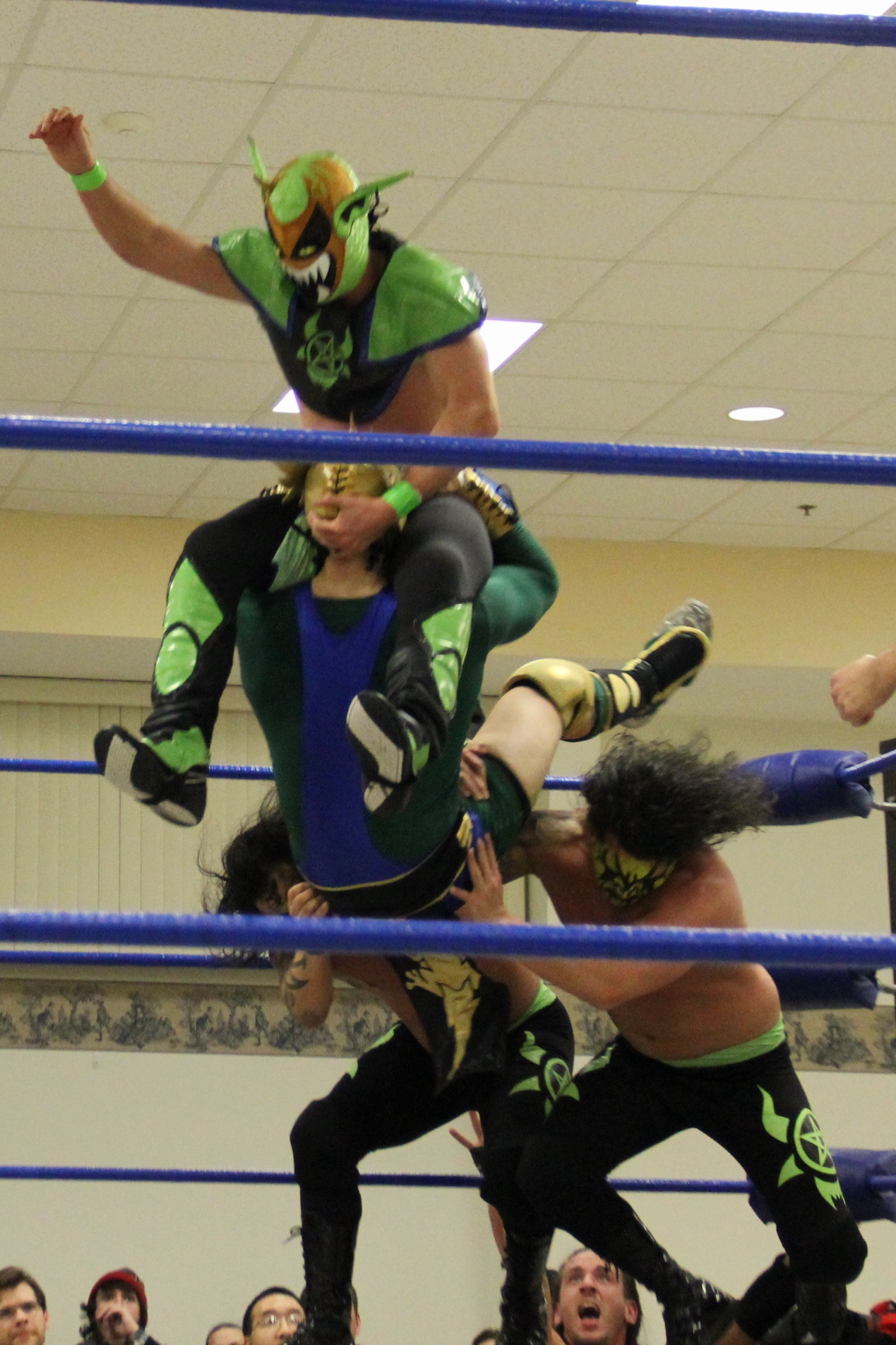

== Organisations ==
- United World Wrestling – the governing body for Olympic wrestling
- WWE
- New Japan Pro-Wrestling – is by attendance and revenue the second largest sports entertainment organization in the world, behind WWE
- Consejo Mundial de Lucha Libre – is the world's oldest wrestling organization, specializing in the Lucha Libre style. Founded in Mexico City in 1933.
- Category:Professional wrestling promotions

=== Sports entertainment ===
- Jess McMahon and Toots Mondt, co-founders of WWE
- Category:Professional wrestlers

== See also ==
- Boxing styles and technique
- Comparison of karate styles
- Comparison of kobudō styles
- Hybrid martial arts
- Styles of Chinese martial arts
