= Devon wrestling =

Form of wrestling from Devon, England

Devon Wrestling
- Also known as: Devonshire Wrestling
- Focus: Grappling, Kicking
- Country of origin: Devon, England
- Famous practitioners: Abraham Cann
- Olympic sport: No

Devon wrestling or Devonshire wrestling is a type of wrestling that originated in Devon, England, which was popular in the nineteenth century. The Devonshire style of wrestling allows footwear to be worn and kicking intended to trip and disable the opponent.

It has similarities to Cornish wrestling but it focuses more on foot moves and less on throwing. Traditionally, Cornish wrestling used 'Hugs and heaves', whereas the Devonshire style used 'Kicks and trips'.

Despite some differences in emphasis and naming conventions, the two styles are considered to be the same, and may be referred to collectively as 'Westcountry Play', or 'Westcountry Wrestling'.

== Practice ==
There are a number of throws that are taught in training classes, but each has many variants depending on context. A wrestler is taught how to exploit their own physical and tactical advantages, and how to use the right technique for the situation.

=== Positions ===
There are 2 initial stances, known as the Wide position and the Narrow position. The wide position is to stand facing forward, with both feet pointing forward and shoulder width apart. The narrow position is to stand with one side of the body leading and the other one trailing, so that the profile of the body is presented to one’s adversary. The position was known in Boxing as ‘the square’ because the heels and feet create a right-angle.

=== Taking hold ===
To grasp the opposing wrestler's jacket is called a 'hitch'. There are 4 main hitches, taken in 2 different ways.

1. The collar hold (‘yoke’ or ‘normal’ hold)
2. The sleeve-and-collar hold
3. The single sleeve hold
4. The sleeve-and-waist hold

=== Throws ===
In Play	Heaves	Back Heave
In Play	Heaves	Cornish Hug
In Play	Heaves	Fore Heave
In Play	Heaves	Flying Mare
In Play	Heaves	Half Heave
In Play	Heaves	Scat un Back
In Play	Heaves	Teddy Bag Heave
In Play	Heaves	Under Heave
In Play	Crooks	Back Crook
In Play	Crooks	Fore Crook
In Play	Crooks	Slip Crook
In Play	Sprags	Back Sprag
In Play	Sprags	Double Sprag
In Play	Sprags	Single Sprag
In Play	Hip Throws	Fore Hip
In Play	Hip Throws	Pull Over Hip
Out Play	Trips	Back Step
Out Play	Trips	Heel
Out Play	Trips	Lock Arm
Out Play	Trips	Pull Under
Out Play	Trips	Toe
Foul Throws	Foul Moves	Cross Collar
Foul Throws	Foul Moves	Crowbar Hitch

== Differences between Devon and Cornish Wrestling ==
There are few differences in practice between the teaching of wrestling in Devon and Cornwall, which is why the art was referred to together. The best descriptions are found in 19th century sources such as newspapers:

The play of Cornwall and Devonshire is the same, with a difference. They both have the jacket, and they play for a hitch in the same fashion. Sticklers are appointed, who keep the ring, and the public are present in crowds.

In Cornwall, however, the man steps into the ring in his stockings or socks. In Devonshire he wears his shoes, made for the express purpose. He is bound by rule not to have any iron or other metal whatever, in his shoe, but he has the soles so hardened by baking that they are very formidable weapons....The difference in the play has been called the in-and-out play, the off-and-on play, the toe-and-heel play. Cornish play—the hugging and heaving; the Devonshire play—the kicking and tripping. It might be thus defined: in Cornwall the shoulders and arms are chiefly relied on, in Devonshire the legs.

In Cornwall the Cornish game is always played, in Devonshire the Devonshire game is played; but on the borders of the counties, in Plymouth especially, where a great deal of play used to be seen, Cornwall and Devonshire met one another, and sometimes each would play his own game. The Devonshire play is a lively play: the kick and the leg-play in general must be very quick, and it is undoubtedly fine play when properly played. If the Cornish player were not thrown in the Devonshire out-play, he would get his man too close to him for a kick, and try his own Cornish play on him. The Devonshire player would still play his leg-play, and a couple of hours might pass before one or the other got his back fall.

The primary differences are in application:

Devon wrestling differs from most other modes. It would, however, be easy to demonstrate its superiority over that practised by other wrestlers, who are unable, with any amount of success, to meet any stranger who does not conform to their own style, whereas knowledge of Devon wrestling enables man to successfully meet whomsoever cares to confront him.

== Rules ==
Original rules, as published in 1888.

The following will be found the rules which are observed in all matches or contests :—

1. Each contestant chooses umpire, and if a referee cannot be agreed upon mutually, the two umpires toss for one. Sometimes power is given the stakeholder to name one; when this done the preliminaries are more easily got over at the ring side.
2. The men after to the drawers put on a strong canvas jacket, though ordinary ones would do equally well, if very strong man may get his holds upon any part of his opponent’s jacket, but he must not take both collars in one hand, neither is he allowed to catch hold of the legs, drawers, or belt.
3. To obtain a “back” one must be pitched flatly upon his back.
  1. The articles should state whether “three pin” or “four pin” match agreed upon; if the former, two shoulders and one hip, or two hip and one shoulder must touch the ground ere back is won; if the latter, the two shoulders and two hips must simultaneously pitch upon the ground.
4. No back allowed if a man’s leg, side, or shoulder first reach the ground; neither is there, if in throwing a man, the thrower allows any part of his own body to be undermost; even the hand or arm, if between a man’s back and the ground, is sufficient to disqualify back, no matter how “flat” the back is otherwise given.
5. Backs are often disallowed only on account of this slight infringement.
6. The rules should be read to the men by the referee before play begins.
7. All arrangements being made, the order is given to commence play; each man then walks to the centre of the ring, and shakes his antagonist’s right hand.
8. The hands must then be separated, after which each tries his best to get good holds.
9. This accomplished the struggle for the falls take place.

== Extinction ==
The cause of the extinction of the sport in Devon has been attributed to a range of factors. It may be likely that no single factor was responsible, but rather a combination of factors led to the sport's extinction.

=== Under-investment ===
The sport lacked investment, and that it wasn't supported as well as Cornish Wrestling was in Cornwall. There was no single governing body in Devon that supported the interests of the sport.

=== Changing tastes ===
The most common reason is that the sport was brutal and was perceived as a blood sport. In the eighteenth and nineteenth century many Devon wrestlers used to wear "baked" boots when wrestling, which could cause serious injury to opponents (on rare occasions leading to death). Another example in the Western Times (1933) where the writer had spoken to old ‘Farmer Ridd, who farmed on Glebe Farm’, Exeter:

“I remember him telling me that he had wrestled in all parts of Devon, and on one occasion he was badly bruised about the legs that the last three miles to his home he crawled on his hands and knees.”

The result was that few spectators chose to watch wrestling, whilst fewer wrestlers opted to compete, thus driving down participation.

=== Match fixing ===
It became more common towards the end of the 19th century that competitors would agree before a match to who was going to win, and thereby fix the result. The intention was that they could bet on the outcome themselves, or otherwise guarantee their own safety without overexertion. Gambling was interwoven into the sport, which meant that match-fixing became an easier way to have a financial gain from a wrestling event. This practice was known at the time as 'faggotting'.

=== Unruly spectators ===
Fights would often break out between spectators, which also added to bringing the sport into disrepute.

== Revival ==
Since the sport became extinct in the late 19th century, there have been a number of attempts to bring back the sport.

First attempt (1925-1926): The St. Budeaux Devon Wrestling Committee (Affiliated to the Cornwall County Wrestling Association) reinstated tournaments within the St. Budeaux Horse Show field. On 3 November 1925, it was reported in the Western Morning News:

EFFORT TO INTRODUCE GAME INTO DEVON. Mr. W. Phillips, of Devonport, is one of many who has been attracted to the revival of Cornish wrestling, and he has tesirous steps taken to introduce the sport into Devon. He has the support loose interested the game Cornwall, although nothing officially has been done yet, certain a commits of those interested in Devon being established, but active advice and support would be assured from the Westernmost county. The introduction of Cornish wrestling into Devon— the old-time Devon style, was too brutal for it to stand a chance of revival— may not easy of accomplishment, but once the initial steps have been taken success will be assured if the present intention of introducing it as sport chiefly, and not altogether a lasttime for spectators.

The event gained limited interest, such that "...junior members were received with great enthusiasm, and they have on several occasions since had practice bouts. Unfortunately, the senior members were not been as keen." Mr Phillips of Davenport was unperturbed and continued to explore collaboration with the Cant. E. H. Whitford Hawkey, of St. Wenn, to work on re-establishing Devon wrestling with the help of the Head of Cornish wrestling. The Cornwall Association secretary, Mr. W. Tickell, Bodmin, replied, and stated how he was "very pleased that a revival of wrestling Devon was possible, as for many years there were matches between the two counties." The plans for the St Budeaux Devon Wrestling Committee was to begin a committee and to see tournaments in Plymouth and London. A few months later, an article appeared in the Western Times exploring the new 'proposed revivial of the game':

I hear that a movement is afoot to revive wrestling in Devon. This news will be welcomed by followers this form of sport, and especially those participants in it in the days when wrestling was the feature of rural entertainments. Half a century ago— and more recent years—no village revel or fair was worthy of the name if it did not include in its programme a wrestling contest. Nothing took the fancy of the countryside or got so much grip on the rural manhood as the bouts that were invariably fought out in the arena between the giants of this game. ... Why should not a revival be made in Devonshire? It would, I feel sure, materially add to the attractions of rural sports gatherings. Therefore one welcomes the proposal of well-known sporting gentleman in the Tiverton district who, I understand, want to see wrestling restored in the county. He purposes organising a meeting in September and hopes to arrange at least couple contests, one for 9-stone men; and under and another for men of any weight. There are still some of the old hands left who would glad to assist and coach the youth of the countryside in this manly game, and doubt some the best of the Cornish players would be willing to give an exhibition match.

No further information about this revival has been found.

2nd attempt (2014 – present): A local project called 'The Devonshire Wrestling Society' (DWS) started in 2014 to bring back the practice of the sport. It was the first time in 100 years that Devonshire Wrestling was formally practiced in Devon. The project was named after the Devonshire and Cornwall Wrestling Society that promoted the sport in the 19th century.

Their mission is:

We share traditional Westcountry Martial Arts with the world. We will build a stronger global connection to our local heritage, and preserve folk martial arts for future generations.

The group have catalogued and presented the sport for people outside of Devon to take up the sport, seeking to make the content more accessible. The modern practice consists of 12 techniques, 2 positions, 4 orientations and 4 hitches (jacket grips), which have been reclaimed from historical records, as well as drawn from modern Cornish Wrestling.

The curriculum is divided into 5 ranks, based upon the traditional structure for training.

Besides practical instruction, the group also maintains an archive of records collected from local museums and archives. Local history groups have welcomed the effort, and provided their own coverage of the project.

There are active clubs in both Plymouth and Exeter. In addition to the Devonshire-style wrestling course, the curriculum covers stickfighting ('Cudgelling') from Somerset, as well as Cornish Wrestling.

== See also ==
- List of Devon wrestlers
- Styles of wrestling
