= Cornish wrestling =

Form of wrestling originating in Cornwall, England

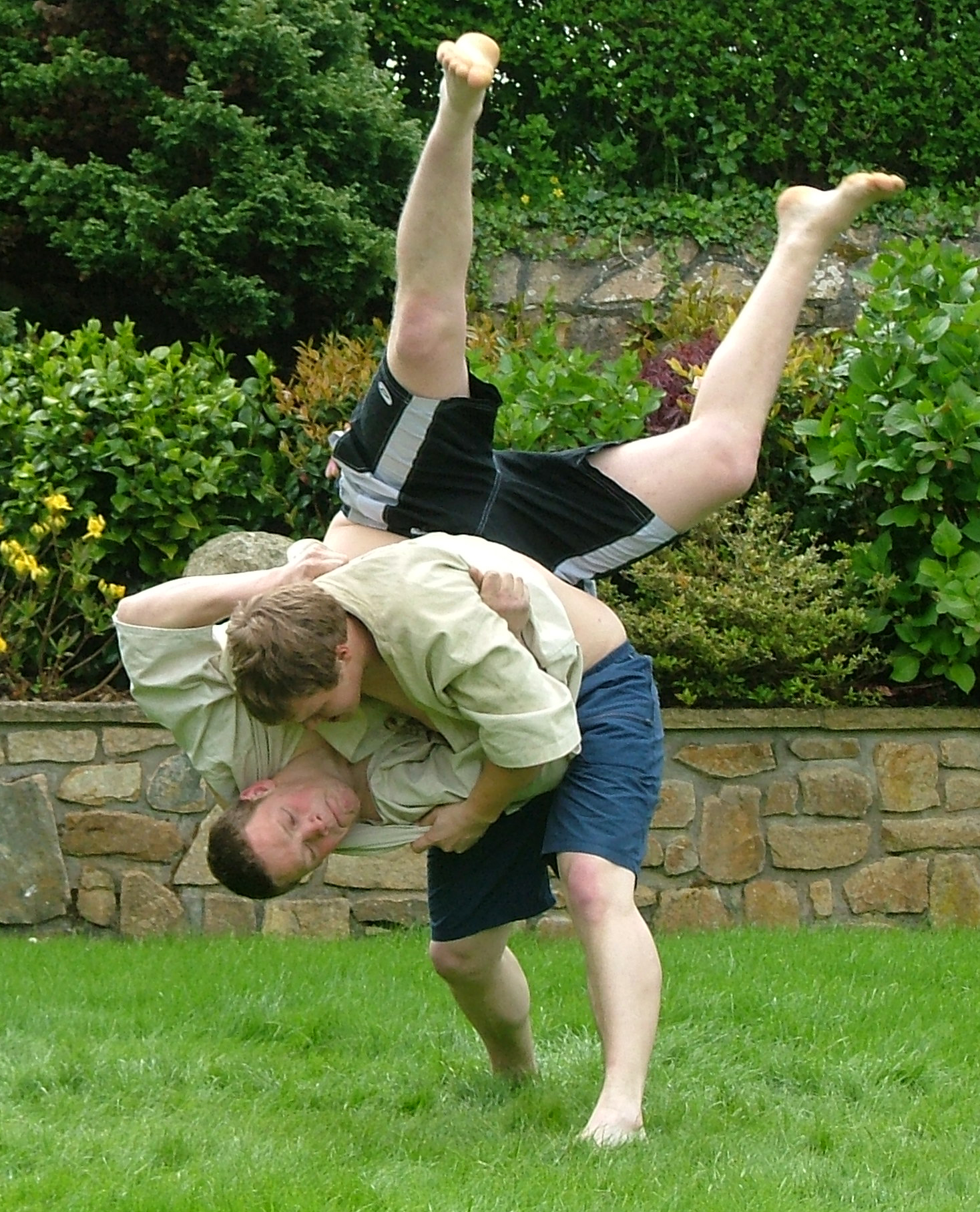
- John Cawley throwing Chris French at Demonstration at Robby Richards Museum Opening - CWA Event 13–14 May 2006.
- Focus: Grappling
- Country of origin: Cornwall
- Creator: Cornish people
- Olympic sport: No

Cornish wrestling (Cornish: Omdowl Kernewek) is a form of wrestling that has been established in Cornwall for many centuries and possibly longer. It is similar to the Breton Gouren wrestling style. It is colloquially known as "wrasslin’" in the Cornish dialect of English; historically, this usage is attested by Chaucer, Shakespeare and Drayton.

The referee is known as a 'stickler', and it is claimed that the popular meaning of the word as a 'pedant' originates from this usage.

Cornish wrestling is a national sport of Cornwall, which spread throughout the British Isles and then, along with the Cornish diaspora, to such places as the United States, Australia, Mexico, New Zealand and South Africa.

It has similarities to Devon wrestling but it was reputed to focus less on foot moves and more on throwing.

== Rules ==
The objective of Cornish wrestling is to throw one's opponent and cause them to land as flat as possible on their back. Each of the wrestlers wears a ‘jacket’ of tough make and material, enabling them to better grip their opponent. Grabbing of the opponent's or your own arms, wrists or fingers is forbidden as well as holding below the waist. All holds are to be taken upon the jacket, although the flat of the hand is allowed to be used to push or deflect an opponent. No fending is permitted. No force on the throat is permitted. Three sticklers watch and control each bout, keeping score of points.

Four pins are located on the back of a wrestler, two at the shoulders and two just above the buttocks. A wrestler scores points by throwing their opponent onto their back, the number of pins hitting the floor being the number of points scored. If a wrestler manages to score with three or four pins this is called a ‘Back’ and the bout is then finished, with the throwing wrestler as the winner. The sticklers each raise their sticks when they perceive a Back has been achieved. A Back may be awarded by majority, i.e. by two out of the three sticklers. If a Back is not awarded, the winner is the wrestler with the most accumulated points within the time limit.

== History ==
Cornish wrestling has a long history, with Geoffrey of Monmouth in Historia Regum Britanniae (c. 1139) describing Corineus, the legendary founder of Cornwall, as a man "of great courage and boldness, who, in an encounter with any person, even of gigantic stature, would immediately overthrow him, as if he were a child", and later tells the story of how Corineus wrestled a Cornish giant, Gogmagog or Goemagot upon the cliff top known as Lamm Goemagot.

Thomas Hoby writes that, in 1551 at Chastenbriant, the French king showed my Lord Marquess of Northampton "great pleasure and disport...sometime with his great boisterlie Bretons wrastling with my lordes yemen of Cornwall, who had much to do to gete the upper hande of them."

Some of the earliest written evidence for wrestling in the West Country comes from a 1612 poem entitled "Poly-Olbion" by Michael Drayton, which gives the names of some Cornish Wrestling throws. Drayton also published a poem in 1627 called The Battle of Agincourt, which concerns the 1415 battle. The poem states that the Cornish men who accompanied Henry V into battle held a banner of two Cornish wrestlers.

Cornish, Devon and Breton wrestlers have long taken part in inter-Celtic matches since at least 1402 and these still occasionally continue. In early times Cornish and Devonian wrestlers often had matches against each other though the rules they followed were not the same. One of these was the notable match between Richard Parkyn and the Devonian John Jordan.

In 1654, Oliver Cromwell and many of his privy council were reported as watching 100 Cornishmen wrestling in Hyde Park, presenting "...great agility of body and most neat and exquisite wrestling at every meeting of one with the other, which was ordered with such dexterity, that it was to show more the strength, vigour and nimbleness of their bodies, than to endanger their persons."

Wrastling is as full of manliness, more delightful and less dangerous (than hurling).... for you shall hardly find an assembly of boyes in Devon and Cornwall, where the most untowardly amongst them will not as readily give you a muster of this exercise as you are prone to require it.

— 17th century historian Richard Carew,

Charles II, along with "a world of lords" and many other spectators, watched a series of wrestling matches in St James' Park in 1669, with a purse of £1000, which saw the "Western men" win.

His Highness York’s great Duke beheld the same
With other persons of renowned fame
Brave Cornishmen, you are to be commended
And will be so until the world is ended.

Sir Thomas Parkyns (1664–1741), known as the Wrestling Baronet, was a devotee of wrestling and organised an annual wrestling match in Bunny Park (prize a gold-laced hat). These matches continued until 1810. His book on the subject The Inn-Play: or, the Cornish Hugg-Wrestler was published in 1713 and reprinted many times.

A contest at Bodmin in 1811 attracted 4,000 spectators, but thereafter interest in the sport waned. James Gerry (of Linkinhorne) and Samuel Rundle (Plymouth) fought for a £20 purse and the championship of Cornwall in 1883 at Liskeard. Lasting just over an hour, the match ended in a draw in the 19th round following Rundle tearing leg muscles. Gerry was reported in The Cornishman newspaper to have vanquished all the best men in America as well as many men in Cornwall, Rundle had beaten nearly all the wrestling men in Devon and Cornwall.

In 1927 William Tregoning Hooper (Bras y Golon) agreed with the Breton Dr. Cottonec of Quimperle that there should be annual wrestling tournaments in which both Cornish and Breton wrestlers would compete. In 1932, the Duke of Cornwall helped fund the competing Cornish wrestlers.

In the 1970s Truro Cathedral School was teaching Cornish wrestling as part of its physical education programme and was the only school in Cornwall to do so.

== Traditions ==
A very old custom was, on the Sunday following a wrestling match or tournament, to wear to church any prizes won. Alternatively they were hung on an inside pillar near the main church door. This custom was especially observed when the victory was with another parish.

Wrestling matches were often located in graveyards, as evidenced by the Bishop of Exeter banning wrestling in graveyards in Cornwall and Devon in 1287.

Some Cornish wrestling matches allowed shin-kicking. This was often referred to as "Cornish purring".

There is an ancient custom whereby sticklers of a tournament would appear at church the following Sunday wearing "Christys" (silk top hats) with streamers (silk ribbons).

There are multiple stories of women being capable wrestlers, even more than 200 years ago. For example, Caroline Andrewartha who was taught wrestling by her father and in turn taught her son Joel Andrewartha, who went on to become one of the best wrestlers in Cornwall, including beating Polkinghorne. Another example is Lizzie Taylor (1831–1887), known as "Happy Ned" or "Lizzie-poor-Dick", who threw John Lillywhite in a wrestling-bout at Clowance. She was a miner who dressed in men's clothes.

During a match, wrestlers shake hands before every hitch.

Prior to the mid-1800s, competitors had to renounce the use of magic before the start of a tournament.

Traditionally wrestlers would challenge each other to wrestling matches by throwing their hat into the ring. The idiom may come from this practice.

In Cornwall, youngsters used to play the game of "shuffle hats and wrastle", where they would throw their hats into a ring, with their owners wrestling off in accordance with the pairing of the hats.

There had been a custom of "begging the ring" whereby old or injured wrestlers would walk around the ring begging for alms. This was replaced by a wrestlers' benevolent fund in 1926 and then by the welfare state.

Wrestling matches were once played in churchyards, but in 1297 the Bishop of Exeter banned it from such places in Devon and Cornwall.

At some tournaments there were prizes for those wrestlers appearing in the neatest costume.

In late Victorian times women were briefly banned from matches, as men often wrestled in their long johns, which was not considered respectable.

Gold laced hats were often used as first place prizes for Cornish wrestling tournaments. It was said that wearers of such hats were immune from the attentions of the press gang.

Wrestlers who were knocked senseless in bouts would often be treated by being "bled" on site if there was a doctor at hand.

In the mid-1800s through to the early 1900s, extra trains were laid on going to and from towns where Cornish wrestling tournaments were being held. In the early 1900s this was extended to extra bus services.

Until 1927 there was no time limit for Cornish wrestling matches and there are records of matches taking many hours and even having to be reconvened the next day. Note that in 1927 the rule became best 2 falls in 20 minutes, but there was much resistance to this change as it was perceived that often the worse player won these matches. This was changed to the current rules of two, ten minute, rounds with points being used to determine the winner if no back is scored. However, this time limit lapsed in the 1940s, was proposed to be reinstated in 1956, but was only reinstated in 1967.

In the early 1800s there were two distinct styles of wrestling. Wrestlers who fought in the Western style included Parkyn and wrestlers who fought with the Eastern style included the Truscotts. This distinction had disappeared by the end of the 1800s.

=== The wrestler's motto ===
Gwari hweg yw gwari teg

English Translation: Fair play is sweet play.

=== The wrestler's oath ===
| Cornish | Translation |
|---|---|
| War ow enor ha war enor ow bro, | On my honour and the honour of my country, |
| My a de omdewlel heb traytouri na garowder, | I swear to wrestle without treachery or brutality |
| Hag avel oll ow lelder my a ystyn ow leuv dhe’m kontrari. | And in token of my sincerity I offer my hand to my opponent. |
| Gans geryow ow hendasow: | In the words of my forefathers: |
| “Gwari hweg yw gwari teg”. | "Fair play is sweet play". |

== Governing bodies ==
There has been significant disagreement, over time, as to which were the ruling governing bodies in the sport and also differences in the precise nature of the rules. This has resulted in simultaneous claimants for world, national and regional titles.

=== Governing bodies outside Cornwall ===
The Devon and Cornish Wrestling Society was formed in 1849.

The Western Counties Wrestling Association was formed in 1877

Worldwide, various regional bodies have governed local Cornish wrestling tournaments or matches. Examples include:

- The Royal Marine Light Infantry for a tournament in Japan (1872);
- The Ivey Athletic Club for tournaments in Michigan, United States;
- The Brotton wrestling committee for Cornish wrestling in Yorkshire;
- The Bendigo Amateur Wrestling Association in Bendigo, Australia;
- The Cornish Association of South Africa;
- Taunton Athletic club in Somerset;
- St Budeaux and District Wrestling Committee for local tournaments in Devon;
- The Duke of Cornwall's Light Infantry in India;
- The Cornish Porcupine wrestling club in Canada;
- Pachuca Athletic Club in Mexico.
- Morro Velho mines in Brazil.

==== Cornwall and Devon wrestling Society ====
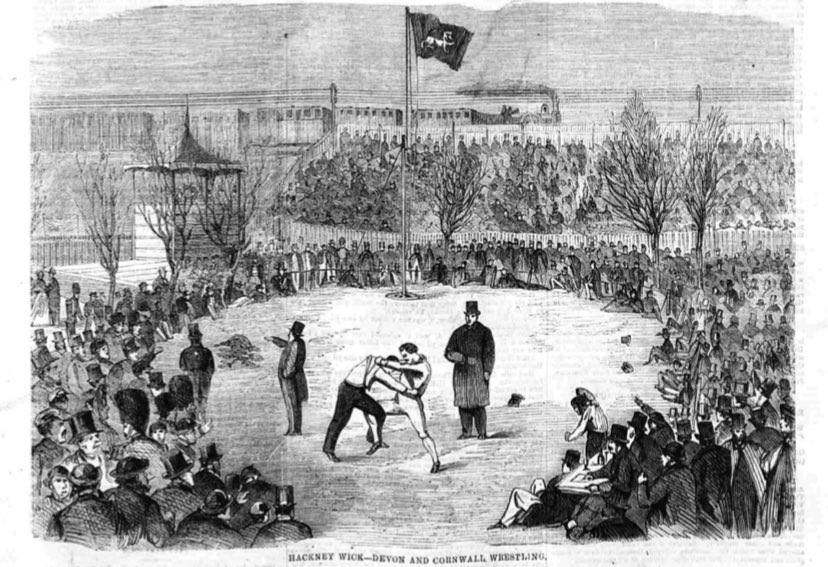
Cornish wrestling in London 1866

The Cornwall and Devon Wrestling Society (also known as the Devon and Cornwall Wrestling Society) was formed in 1752, running tournaments and matches in London, often at Hackney Wick. Open competitions were held, awarding significant belts and prizes funded by the patrons. However, only natives of Cornwall were permitted to compete for the Great Duke of Cornwall cup.

==== Patrons of the Cornwall and Devon Wrestling Society ====
- The Prince of Wales for many years.
- Sir Arthur William Buller from 1868.

=== Governing bodies inside Cornwall ===
==== County committee ====
In 1886 and 1887 a series of wrestling tournaments (in Truro, Penzance and Redruth amongst others) was organised by what was described as the "County Committee" with secretary Mr J F Mark.

==== Cornish Wrestling Association ====
The different regional associations within Cornwall merged into the Cornwall County Wrestling Association ("CCWA") in September 1923, under the presidency of Lord St Levan, to help standardize the rules, facilitate the competing of Duchy championships, mitigate the risk of clashing tournaments and promote Cornish Wrestling throughout Cornwall and indeed Worldwide. When the CCWA was formed there were only 9 affiliated local associations, but by 1925 there were over 50. Note that the Newquay and Port Isaac associations initially indicated that they wanted nothing to do with the CCWA.

In 1927 the CCWA adopted a rule that if there was no back obtained within 20 minutes wrestling, then the match would be decided by the best of 2 falls. Note that previously there had been no time limit on bouts. In 1928 this was changed to two 10 minute rounds where, if there was no back, accumulated points decided the winner. Note there was still no time limit for championship finals.

In 1928, William Tregonning Hooper initiated inter-Celtic tournaments between the CCWA and its counterpart in Brittany, as the similarities of Breton and Cornish wrestling are sufficient for successful competitions to be held between the two.

In 1930, the CCWA had financial difficulties resulting in suspension of activities and the belts and cups being seized by the bank. As a result, belts and cups were not awarded.

In 1932, the CCWA was refinanced, with help from the London Cornish Association, Federation of Old Cornwall Societies, Viscount Clifden, the Western Morning News and the Duke of Cornwall, and the belts and cups were retrieved from the bank. In 1933 the CCWA changed its name to the Cornish Wrestling Association ("CWA") and adopted a rule to limit rounds to 15 minutes.

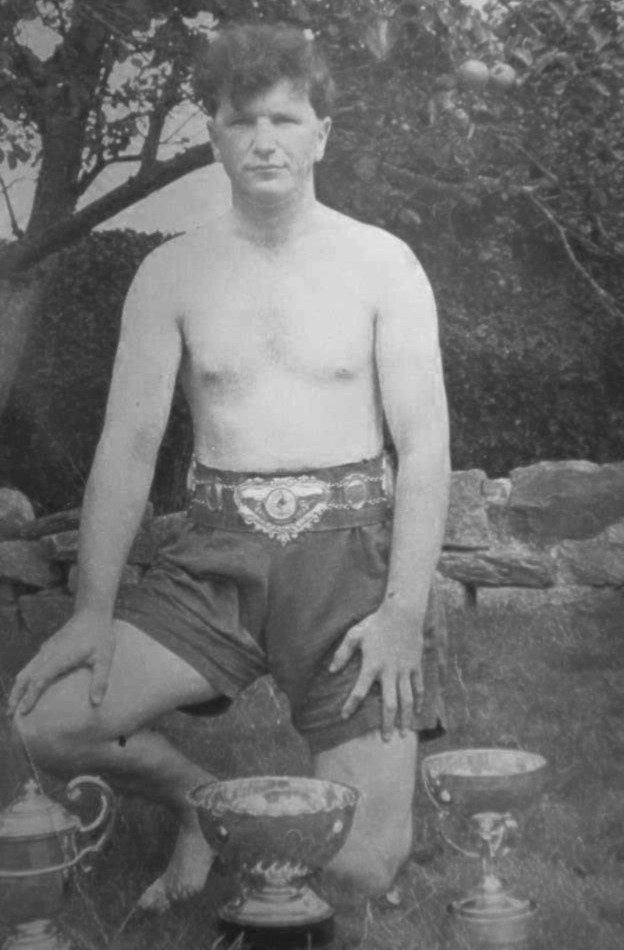
Portrait of Keith John Menadue wearing the Cornish Wrestling Association Heavyweight Championship Belt 1956

In 1933 various local wrestling associations had competitions unaffiliated to the CWA, culminating with St Mawgan holding a championship of Cornwall, "under the old Cornish wrestling rules".

The East Cornwall Wrestling Federation ("ECWF") was formed in 1934, at least in part to hold competitions under more traditional rules (the time limit being a key issue). The ECWF also complained that the CWA had preferred placing championship tournaments in West Cornwall and had preferred selecting wrestlers from West Cornwall to represent Cornwall in the inter-Celtic competition. The ECWF held rival championship titles of heavyweight, middleweight and lightweight champion in the "Old Cornish Style". In 1934, the CWA initially suspended wrestlers involved with ECWF competitions. This rule was suspended in 1936, but re-instigated in 1938.

In 1936 the CWA removed the time limit to matches.

In 1946, the ECWF was absorbed by the CWA, who have overseen almost all tournaments since. A modern example of an exception to this was the annual St Mawgan tournament, which rejoined in 2025.

In 1965 the CWA adopted a 10 minute limit to the duration of matches with points choosing the winner where a back was not achieved. However, the finals of championship matches went back to being two, 10 minute rounds.

In 1994 the CWA opened competitions to women.

In 2004 the CWA became affiliated with the British Wrestling Association.

==== Patrons of the CCWA/CWA ====
- Lord St Levan between 1923 and 1934.
- Commander Sir Edward Nicholl from 1923 for many years.
- The Prince of Wales between 1932 and 1935.
- Sir John Langdon Bonython between 1932 and 1935.
- Viscount Clifden between 1932 and 1934.

== Notable people who were also Cornish wrestlers ==
- King Henry VIII was a confident wrestler, but he lost a hitch with the French king, Francis I, at the Field of the Cloth of Gold (possibly with a Flying Mare), after his Cornish wrestlers had soundly defeated Francis' Breton wrestlers.
- John Wesley had been a Cornish wrestler in his youth.
- According to his brother, Sir Humphry Davy was a Cornish wrestler in his youth. Davy was a Cornish chemist, inventor, a baronet, President of the Royal Society (PRS), Member of the Royal Irish Academy (MRIA), Fellow of the Geological Society (FGS), member of the Royal Geological Society of Cornwall, and a member of the American Philosophical Society (elected 1810).
- Cornish inventor Richard Trevithick, was a champion Cornish Wrestler.

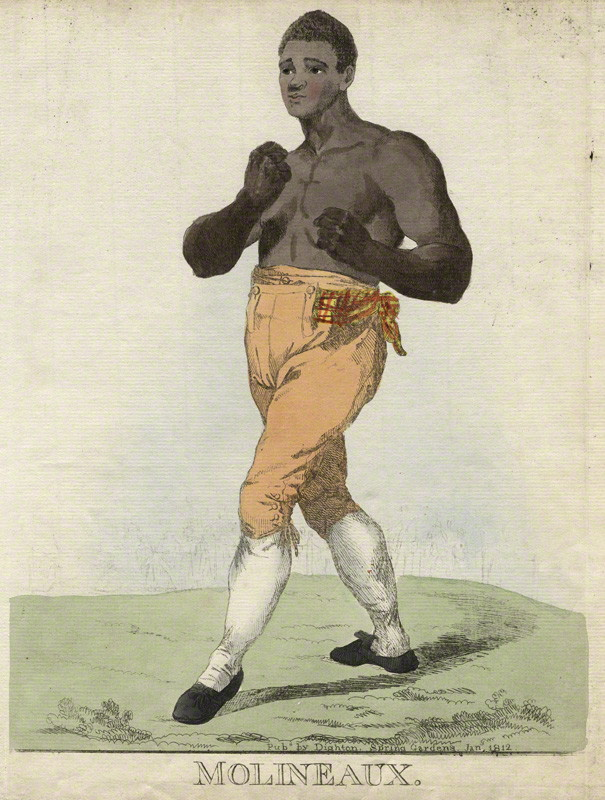
Tom Molineaux

- Tom Molineaux, the famous bare knuckle boxer, entered Cornish wrestling tournaments in England when touring in the early 1800s.
- Billy Bray, the famous unconventional Cornish preacher, was a Cornish wrestler.
- Abraham Lincoln, the president of the United States, was a Cornish wrestler and would practice Cornish wrestling during his work-outs in the White House.
- The US president, statesman and soldier Theodore Roosevelt, started training in Cornish wrestling when he was New York governor, where he was taught three times a week by Professor Mike J Dwyer.
- John Lillywhite, the famous cricketer who was in the first England team, competed in Cornish wrestling tournaments in the mid-1800s.
- US senator, Thomas Kearns, when he moved from Kansas to Utah, went around Cornish mining camps challenging the strongest miners to Cornish wrestling matches for side bets.
- Bob Fitzsimmons was a Cornish professional boxer who was the sport's first three-division world champion between 1894 and 1903. He knew Cornish wrestling from when he was a boy and used Cornish wrestling tricks in his early fist fights. He usually had a wrestler in his camp while training for a fight.
- Roy Jennings was a rugby player that played for Redruth and the British Lions (touring Australia and New Zealand in 1930), who regularly competed in Cornish wrestling tournaments in the 1930s. He also represented Cornwall in the 1933 inter-Celtic wrestling tournament.
- The actors, Paul Dupuis and Ralph Michael, studied Cornish wrestling under middleweight champion Tom Cundry, for their roles in the film - Johnny Frenchman. Later, Dupuis and Michael were invited to enter the Cornish wrestling festival at Helston.

== Cornish wrestling throws ==
There are a number of throws that are taught in training classes, but each has many variants.

| In Play | Heaves | Back Heave |
| In Play | Heaves | Cornish Hug |
| In Play | Heaves | Fore Heave |
| In Play | Heaves | Flying Mare |
| In Play | Heaves | Half Heave |
| In Play | Heaves | Scat un Back |
| In Play | Heaves | Teddy Bag Heave |
| In Play | Heaves | Under Heave |
| In Play | Crooks | Back Crook |
| In Play | Crooks | Fore Crook |
| In Play | Crooks | Slip Crook |
| In Play | Sprags | Back Sprag |
| In Play | Sprags | Double Sprag |
| In Play | Sprags | Single Sprag |
| In Play | Hip Throws | Fore Hip |
| In Play | Hip Throws | Pull Over Hip |
| Out Play | Trips | Back Step |
| Out Play | Trips | Heel |
| Out Play | Trips | Lock Arm |
| Out Play | Trips | Pull Under |
| Out Play | Trips | Toe |
| Foul Throws | Foul Moves | Cross Collar |
| Foul Throws | Foul Moves | Crowbar Hitch |

== Championships ==
The following Senior Championships are fought annually in competitions across the Duchy, overseen by the CWA:

| Championship | Current Weight limit (lbs) | 1963 Weight limit (lbs) | 1938 Weight limit (lbs) | 1936 Weight limit (lbs) | 1924 Weight Limit (lbs) |
|---|---|---|---|---|---|
| Heavyweight | Open | Open | Open | Open | Open |
| Light Heavyweight | 210 | 180 | N/A | N/A | N/A |
| Middleweight | 182 | 160 | 160 | 160 | 160 |
| Lightweight | 168 | 145 | 145 | 145 | 145 |
| Featherweight | 154 | 130 | 130 | 140 | 130 |
| Ladies | Open | N/A | N/A | N/A | N/A |

Note that women have held some of the weight based championships.

The following Junior Championships are fought annually in competitions across the Duchy:

- Under 18s Belt
- Under 16s Trophy
- Under 14s Trophy
- Under 12s Trophy
- Under 10s Trophy

== Outside Cornwall ==
Cornish wrestling is Cornwall's oldest sport and as Cornwall's native tradition it has travelled the world to places like Victoria, Australia and Grass Valley, California, following the miners and gold rushes.

== See also ==
- Cornish wrestling throws
- List of topics related to Cornwall
- Collar-and-elbow
- Cumberland and Westmorland wrestling
- Devon wrestling
- Gouren
- Francis Gregory
- James Polkinghorne
- Richard Parkyn
- Scottish Backhold
