= Cornish wrestling throws =

List of martial art moves

Cornish wrestling is an ancient martial art which later became the sport that is still practiced today.

The following sections give a brief introduction to the rules and points system of Cornish wrestling and brief descriptions of some of the throws. Note that the Cornish language names for the throws are in brackets after the main English language name.

Most of the throws described have multiple variants. Some of these have alternative names. Below, some of the main variants are included. It is also noted, that the names of the throws have evolved over time and different regions have sometimes used alternative names. The history of Cornish wrestling, is not of classes with an agreed syllabus of moves being taught to everyone. Rather it is of techniques being taught mainly in families (father to son), with each family potentially having their own terminology. There is bound to have been some copying of moves that work, but it would have been easy for misunderstandings to occur re names. This resulted in names of techniques not being consistently used, even contemporarily.

Note that some of the names quoted have origins in other styles of wrestling, but were used when practitioners of other styles published descriptions of Cornish wrestling throws.

== Rules and scoring ==
=== Rules ===
Both wrestlers must wear a Cornish Wrestling jacket and must not be wearing shoes. All holds are taken upon the other wrestler's jacket, grabbing of the wrists or fingers is forbidden as well as any holding below the waist. Although all holds are to be taken upon the jacket, the flat of the hand is allowed to be used to push or deflect an opponent.

When any part of the body, other than the feet, touches the ground the hitch is deemed "broken" and the wrestlers must cease fighting, shake hands and restart the contest.

The handshake is a formality which is traditional and must take place before a contest begins, before each hitch and after the bout is over.

=== Scoring ===
As with other styles of wrestling, the aim is to defeat the opponent, but in the Cornish manner. To do this either score a "Back" or more cumulated points must be scored.

"Faults" are given against a wrestler who breaks the rules and one point will be deducted from their score for each offence. It is a foul, for instance, if a wrestler puts a hand to ground to stop the wrestler from being thrown, or slips out of the jacket for the same purpose; sticklers (referees) will first warn the wrestler of their offence before faulting them.

A "Back" is scored when a wrestler has been picked up and dropped flat on their back so that at least three of their four "Pins" hit the ground simultaneously. "Pins" are the shoulders and hips. A "Back" will win a contest for a contestant whenever it takes place and the bout is then over; but if there is no "Back" during a contest the bout will be decided on points.

Points are scored when a pin hits the ground; one point for one pin down and two points for two pins down. All throws must be made from the standing position and there must be no grappling on the ground whatsoever.

If no points are scored during a contest a point will be awarded to the wrestler showing most "Play", i.e., one who has made most honest attempts to throw their opponent.

== Heaves ==
=== Back Heave ===
Commonly known as Back Heave (Halyans war-dhelergh).

Also known as Backward Heave and Back Waist-lock.

- As the throwee attacks, coming into the thrower hip to hip, the thrower takes grip across their lower back pulling them into the thrower's body.
- The thrower leans away from the throwee, while keeping a strong grip on them, taking the weight off their legs.
- While lifting the throwee, the thrower rotates the throwee over their leg towards the rear so that the throwee land on their back behind the thrower, who makes sure that they rotate, so as not to land on their back.

=== Cornish Hug ===
Commonly known as Cornish Hug.

To give a Cornish hug is a phrase derived from the Cornish wrestling throw, which means to squeeze very tightly, or to plan the downfall of someone who is openly embraced. Historically Cornish wrestlers were famous for this throw.

Also known as Cornish Heave and Cornish Hugg. In Australia this was sometimes called a Cornish "hockle".

- The thrower puts both arms around the throwee and pulls them close.
- The thrower then leans backwards lifting the throwee into the air.
- The throwee is then cast across the thrower's thigh onto their back.
- Sometimes, as part of this throw, the thrower places their leg between the throwee's legs.

=== Fore Heave ===
Most commonly known as Fore Heave (Halyans war-rag).

Also known as Forward Heave, Heave, Forehitch, Outside Stroke and Fore Waist Lock.

1	2	3	4

- As the throwee attacks, coming into the thrower hip to hip, the thrower takes grip across their lower back pulling them into the thrower's body.
- The thrower leans away from the throwee, while keeping a strong grip on them, taking the weight off their legs.
- While lifting the throwee, the thrower rotates the throwee over their leg so that the throwee lands on their back in front of the thrower.

=== Flying Mare ===
Commonly known as Flying Mare (Kasek neyja).

Also known as Mare, Slew (said to be invented by "Phep" Hancock), Slue, Shoulder and Flying Mair.

1	2	3

- The thrower takes grip on the ropes of throwee's jacket.
- The thrower rotates, so that both wrestlers are facing the same direction, while pulling the throwee towards them and moving quickly in the same direction, building momentum.
- When moving at speed, the thrower stops abruptly and bends forward, pulling the throwee up and over their back and head.
- Keeping grip of the rope, the thrower rotates the throwee's back toward the ground.

=== Half Heave ===
Commonly known as Half Heave (Hanter Halyans).

- This throw is useful if the throwee is too heavy to bodily raise off the ground with an Under Heave.
- The thrower releases their dominant hand and pulls the throwee down while stepping forward and ducking their head underneath the throwee's arm.
- The dominant arm is then passed under the front of the throwee's belly at waist height.
- The thrower then grips the far side of the throwee's jacket, lifts the throwee upwards and then steps through with their dominant leg and performs a Heel, rolling the throwee down the thrower's thigh.

==== Alternative Under Heave ====
There is a variant of the Half Heave known as the Alternative Under Heave.

- This is the same as the Half Heave, except that the thrower's subordinate hand drops the shoulder grip and the flat of the hand presses down on the back of the throwee's head.

=== Scat un Back ===
Commonly known as Scat un Back (Knouk war-dhelergh).

Also known as Knock Back, Knock over the Knee, Sweep, Side Sweeping, Hank, Back Lock and Inside Clamp.

1	2	3	4

- As the throwee attacks, coming into the thrower, hip to hip or stepping across the front of the thrower's body, the thrower takes grip across the throwee's lower back pulling them into the thrower's body.
- The thrower steps behind the throwee so that the thrower's leg strikes both of the throwee's legs while pulling them to the rear.
- The thrower rotates the throwee over their thigh, backwards, so that they land flat on their back, rotating so as to make sure that the thrower does not land also on their back.

=== Teddy Bag Heave ===
Commonly known as Teddy Bag Heave (Halyans Sagh Tetis).

The name comes from how people throw a bag of potatoes over their shoulder.

Also known as Shoulder, "Sand Sack" Heave and Tattie Bag Heave.

Historically, this throw has sometimes been called the Flying Mare.

- The thrower holds the throwee's sleeve with their subordinate hand and transfers their dominant hand, palm up to grab the other side of the jacket.
- The thrower moves their dominant foot in front of the throwee's dominant foot while pulling up the throwee's arm and tucking their dominant elbow into the throwee's armpit (keeping hold of the grips on the jacket).
- With both hips now facing the same direction, the thrower lifts the throwee with their legs and flips the throwee head over heels over their shoulder.
- There is a variant of this throw where the throwee passes their dominant hand under the throwee's raised arm and grabs the outside of their shoulder (rather than keeping hold of their grip and tucking their elbow into the throwee's armpit).

=== Under Heave ===
Commonly known as Under Heave (Halyans a-dhann).

Also known as Flying Horse, Arm Heave (Halyans Bregh), Belly Heave, Belly faunce and Cross Heave.

This throw appears to be unique to Cornish wrestling.

- The thrower releases their dominant hand and pulls the throwee down while stepping forward and ducking their head underneath the throwee's arm.
- The dominant arm is then passed under the front of the throwee's belly at waist height.
- The thrower then grips the far side of the throwee's jacket and lifts the throwee bodily upwards, turning them head over heels and dropping them on their back.

== Crooks ==
=== Back Crook ===
Commonly known as Back Crook (Bagh War-dhelergh).

Also known as Backward Faulx, Backward Falx, Backward Crook, Inside-Lock Backwards, Back Click, Click on the Side and Hank.

Note that Falx is Latin for sickle.

This throw has various variations all jointly known as Back Crooks.

==== Variant 1 ====
- The thrower simultaneously (i) moves their dominant arm over the top over the throwee's shoulder tightly grasping the jacket at the top of the throwee's outside shoulder. and (ii) steps with their inside leg between the throwee's legs and hooks their foot around the throwee's ankle (as with the Fore Crook).
- With both hips now at right angles, the thrower lifts their crooking leg forwards as high as possible while leaning backwards with the upper body and pulling backwards on the shoulder.
- The thrower pushes against the throwee's neck with their shoulder and upper arm overbalancing the throwee backwards.

==== Variant 2 ====
- The thrower attempts the Fore Crook, but fails to overbalance the throwee.
- The thrower then swings the crooked leg forwards and swings it as high as possible to the front.
- At the same time, the thrower moves their arm from behind the throwee to across the front of their chest and pushes backwards.

==== Back Crook Twisted ====
This variant is sometimes called the Back Crook Twisted (Treylvagh a-denewen).

- The thrower simultaneously (i) moves their dominant arm over the top over the throwee's far shoulder and reaches down with the flat of their hand holding the throwee close and (ii) steps with their inside leg between the throwee's legs and hooks their foot around the throwee's ankle (as with the Fore Crook).
- With both hips now at right angles, the thrower lifts their crooking leg forwards as high as possible while leaning backwards with the upper body.
- The thrower pushes against the throwee's neck with their shoulder and upper arm overbalancing the throwee backwards.

=== Fore Crook ===
Most commonly known as Fore Crook (Bagh war-rag).

Also known as Inturn, Forward Faulx, Forward Falx, Inside Crook, Forward Crook, Inner Crook, Inlock, Grapevine, Crook, Fore Click, Foretrip, Lock, Fore-lock, Cornish Forward Lock, Inside Click, High Crook, Fore Crook Twisted (Treylvagh war-rag), Inside Lock and Inside-lock Forward.

Note that Falx is Latin for sickle.

1	2	3

- The thrower moves their dominant arm over the top over the throwee's shoulder placing the flat of their hand on the top of the throwee's outside shoulder.
- With both hips now facing the same direction, the thrower steps with their inside leg between the throwee's legs pushing back and hooking their foot around the throwee's ankle lifting their leg to the rear.
- Leaning forward with the upper body, the thrower pulls with the outside arm to rotate the throwee's back towards the ground.

=== Slip Crook ===
Most commonly known as Slip Crook (Bagh skapys).

Also known as Hitch Over, Slipped Crook, Unshipped Lock and Slip Lock.

1	2	3	4

- This is a combination throw, which starts as a Fore Crook, but then changes into another throw.
- The thrower moves their dominant arm over the top over the throwee's shoulder placing the flat of their hand on the top of the throwee's outside shoulder.
- With both hips now facing the same direction, the thrower steps between the throwee's legs with their inside leg, pushing back and hooking their foot around the throwee's ankle lifting their leg to the rear.
- Leaning forward with the upper body the thrower pulls with the outside arm to rotate the throwee's back towards the ground, at the same time releasing the inside leg and stepping across the throwee's outside leg and sweeping it to the rear.

== Sprags ==
=== Back Sprag ===
Commonly known as Back Sprag.

Also known as the Double Lock.

- This defensive technique is used as a counter to the Back Crook.
- As the throwee attempts to raise the thrower's crooked leg forwards, the thrower passes their other leg between the throwee's legs and hooks the heel (as with the Back Strap) while pushing the throwee's shoulders backwards.

1

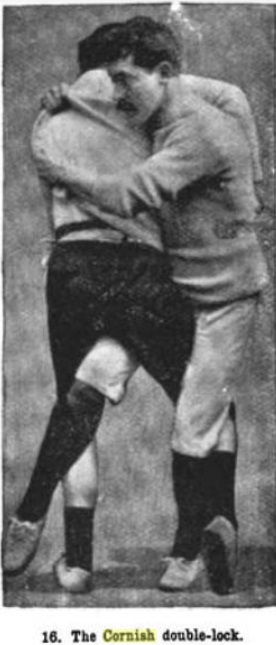
Back Sprag

=== Double Sprag ===
Commonly known as Double Sprag (Lestans dewblek).

Also known as Sprag and

1

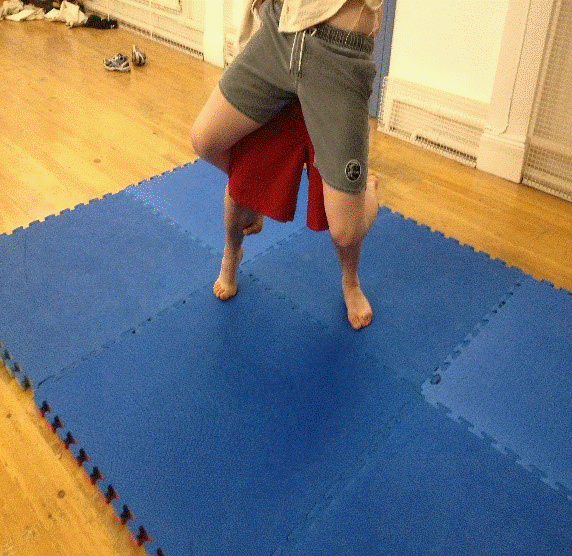

- This defensive technique is used when being lifted while both wrestlers are facing the same direction.
- The defender locks each leg around each of the aggressor's legs either both inside or both outside so that they cannot lift the defender any further.

=== Single Sprag ===
Commonly known as Single Sprag (Lestans unnik).

1

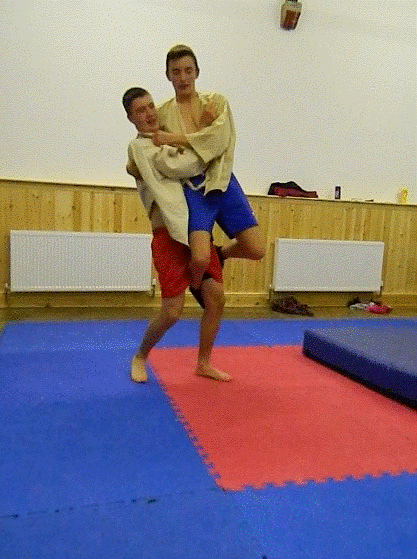

- This defensive technique is used when being lifted while both wrestlers are facing the same direction.
- The defender wraps both legs around one of the aggressor's legs so that they cannot lift the defender any further.

== Hip Throws ==
=== Fore Hip ===
Most commonly known as Fore Hip (Klun war-rag).

Also known as Fore Heep, Hipt, Fore Heap, Hip, Hippe, Heap, Intern Heap, Vore Heap, Cross buttock, Vor Eap, Hip-lock, Heave, Heave and Hip, Forward Hip and Buttock.

1	2	3	4

- The thrower moves their dominant arm underneath the shoulder and around the throwee's back placing the flat of the hand on the hip.
- With both hips now facing the same direction, the thrower steps with their inside leg in front of both of the throwee's legs making sure to bring the thrower's hips into the throwee's lap.
- Leaning forward to lift the throwee's legs off the ground, the thrower rotates the throwee over their hip so that the throwee lands on their back in front of the thrower.

=== Pull Over Hip ===
Commonly known as Pull Over Hip.

Also known as Cross Buttock.

- This throw is similar to the Fore Hip, except that rather than passing the dominant arm around the throwee's waist, the dominant elbow is hooked into the throwee's armpit so as to get the required leverage to pull them over the throwers hip.
- This setup can lead to a faster throw than the Fore Hip, but is more difficult to control.

== Trips ==
=== Back Step ===
Commonly known as Back Step (Kamm war-dhelergh).

Also known as Back Strap, Back Heel, Cross-lock, Click on the Side and In-clamp.

==== Variant 1 ====
1	2	3	4

- The thrower takes grip on the ropes of the throwee's jacket and pulls the throwee towards the thrower.
- When the throwee pulls away, the thrower steps between their legs and hooks the back of one of their legs, pushing them to the ground so that they land flat on their back.
- The thrower's hooking foot can be placed either between their legs (as per the photo above) or outside and around one of their legs.

==== Inturn ====
This variant is commonly known as the Inturn.

Also known as Turne, Intourne, Inturne and In-turn.

- This variant is the same as the Back Step, except that the grip does not need to be taken on the ropes.
- For example, the grip can be taken with one hand on the throwee's elbow and the other arm over the shoulder pulling the throwee close.

=== Heel ===
Commonly known as Heel (Seudhel).

Also known as Cross Buttock, Fore, Running Heel, Long Heel and Trip.

This throw has many variations, all of which are jointly described as Heel throws.

==== Variant 1 ====
- The thrower performs a Fore Crook, but rather than crooking the throwee's leg, the thrower uses their ankle to lift the throwee's ankle.

==== Variant 2 ====
- When the throwee is off balance and going backwards, the thrower steps forwards with their subordinate foot to the outside of the throwee's foot and then sweeps the back of the throwee's legs (with the thrower's dominant foot) while pushing the throwee's shoulders backwards.

==== Variant 3 ====
- The thrower steps across the throwee and places their heel outside the ankle, calf or behind the knee of the throwee.
- The thrower pulls the throwee over this leg while pushing the leg backwards, rolling the throwee onto their back.
- When the thrower goes heel to ankle, the thrower should only place their heel on the ground to facilitate the rotation of their body while pulling the throwee over their leg.

==== Outside Lock ====
This variant is sometimes called the Outside Lock.

- This is really a variation of Variant 3, where the toe or ankle of the leading leg is hooked around the outside of the throwee's leg, to attempt to hinder the throwee from stepping out of the throw.

=== Lock Arm ===
Commonly known as Lock Arm (Bregh strothys).

Also known as Cramp Arm and Cram Arm and Heel.

- This move immobilises one of the throwees arms enabling various throws to be performed with the throwee at a disadvantage.
- The thrower passes his arm around the outside of the throwee's arm, passes under the arm and is then pushed in between the wrestlers to grab the throwee's collar.
- The thrower then pushes their elbow upwards, forcing the throwee upwards, facilitating easier throwing using the Toe, Fore Hip, Heel or Crook.

=== Pull Under ===
Commonly known as Pull Under.

- This refers to a throw with both hands gripping the same side of the jacket (see variants below) and a throw which is used to counter the Fore Crook.
- The throwee attempts to perform a Fore Crook on the thrower, with the entwined legs lifted behind them.
- The thrower transfers their near hand to grip the throwee's far collar with the palm outwards (so both hands are gripping the same side).
- The thrower twists the jacket behind the far shoulder and pulls the throwee underneath them as they both fall.

==== Pull Under and Heel ====
The Pull Under has a variant commonly known as Pull Under and Heel (Seudhel a-denewen).

Also known as Pull Over Heel

- This refers to a Heel throw with both hands gripping the same side of the jacket.

==== Pull Under and Toe ====
The Pull Under also has a variant commonly known as Pull under and Toe.

- This refers to a Toe throw with both hands gripping the same side of the jacket.

=== Toe ===
Commonly known as Toe (Bys Troes).

Also known as Heaving Toe and Hanging Trippet.

- This throw uses the inside of the thrower's foot to strike the outside of the throwee's heel, calf or outside of the knee, while simultaneously pulling the throwee's body over the striking foot.

== Foul Moves ==
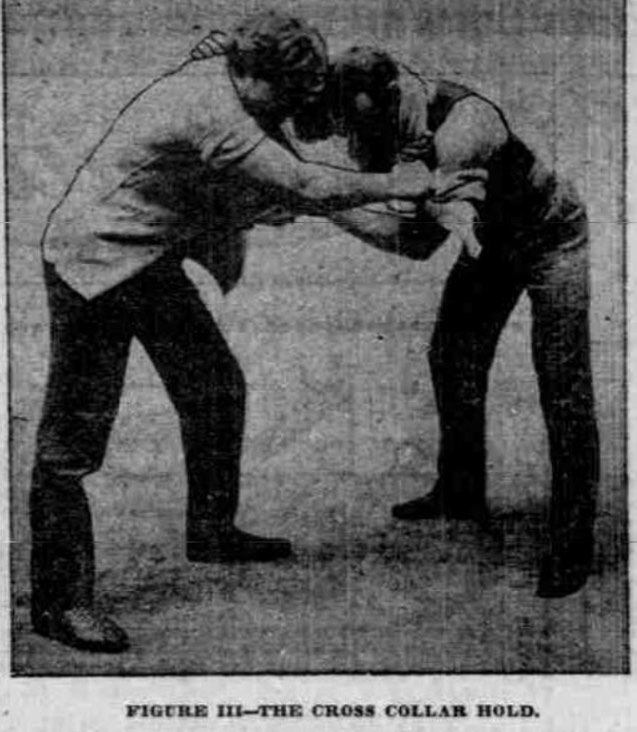
Cross Collar

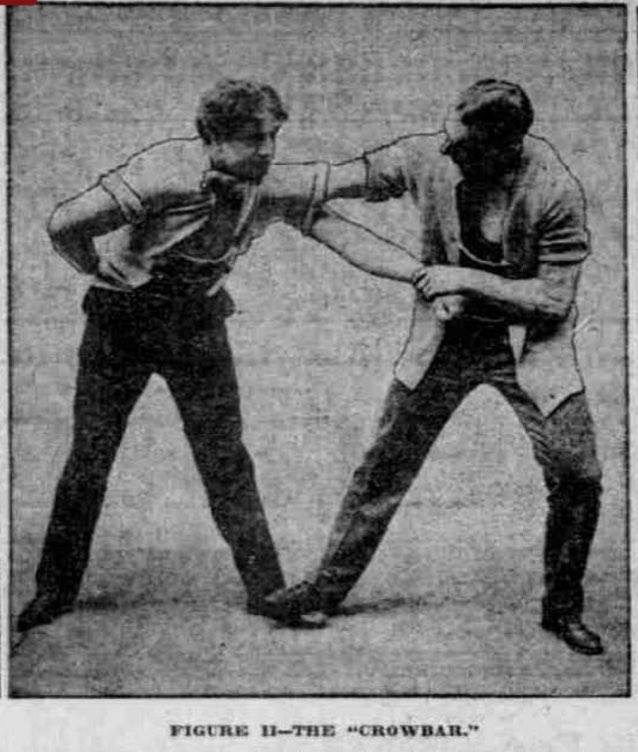
Crowbar

Below are a list of moves which are fouls.

=== Cross Collar ===
Commonly known as Cross Collar.

- Move that causes choking by crossing the arms in front of the throwee and pulling the jacket tight.

=== Crowbar Hitch ===
Commonly known as Crowbar Hitch.

- Move where the arm is passed inside the jacket, up the sleeve and used as a lever.
