= Li Jianwu =

- 李健吾
- Born: August 17, 1906; Yuncheng County, Shanxi, China
- Died: November 24, 1982 (aged 76); Beijing, China
- Education: Tsinghua University; University of Paris
- Occupations: Author, dramatist, translator
- Writing career
- Pen name: Liu Xiwei (刘西渭)
- Language: Chinese, French
- Period: 1933–1982
- Genres: Novel, drama
- Notable work: Madame Bovary

Li Jianwu (Chinese: 李健吾; pinyin: Lǐ Jiànwú; 17 August 1906 - 24 November 1982) was a Chinese author, dramatist and translator who was the president of French Literature Research Council. Li was an officer of the Chinese State Council and a member of National Committee of the Chinese People's Political Consultative Conference. He translated the works of the French novelists Gustave Flaubert and Stendhal into Chinese.

== Biography ==
Li was born in 1906 in Yuncheng County, Shanxi, his father, Li Mingfeng (Chinese: 李鸣凤), was a warlord of Qing Empire. After the downfall of Yuan Shikai Administration, Li's family moved to Beijing, where he studied at Beijing Normal University's Elementary School. At the age of 13, his father was killed by Anhui clique General Chen Shufan. Li went on to attend the High School Affiliated to Beijing Normal University in 1921, at the same time, he started to publish works, and made the acquaintance of Wang Tongzhao (Chinese: 王统照).

In 1925, Li was put under house arrest for his opposition to Minister of Education Ma Junwu. That same year, he entered Tsinghua University with a major in Western languages. In 1931, Li went to France to study at the University of Paris. After graduating in 1933, he taught at Jinan University.

During the Second Sino-Japanese War, Li moved to the French Concession to escape the violence. There he met Chinese writers Zheng Zhenduo, A Ying and Xia Yan.

After the founding of the People's Republic of China, Li worked as a researcher at Peking University and the Chinese Academy of Sciences.

== Works ==
- Memoirs of a Madman (Gustave Flaubert)
- Sentimental Education (Gustave Flaubert)
- Dictionary of Received Ideas (Gustave Flaubert)
- Madame Bovary (Gustave Flaubert) (Chinese: 包法利夫人)
- Italian Chroniques (Stendhal) (Chinese: 意大利遗事)
- Armance (Stendhal)
- The Red and the Black (Stendhal)
- Lucien Leuwen (Stendhal)
- The Charterhouse of Parma (Stendhal)
