= Ma Xianda =

Chinese martial artist

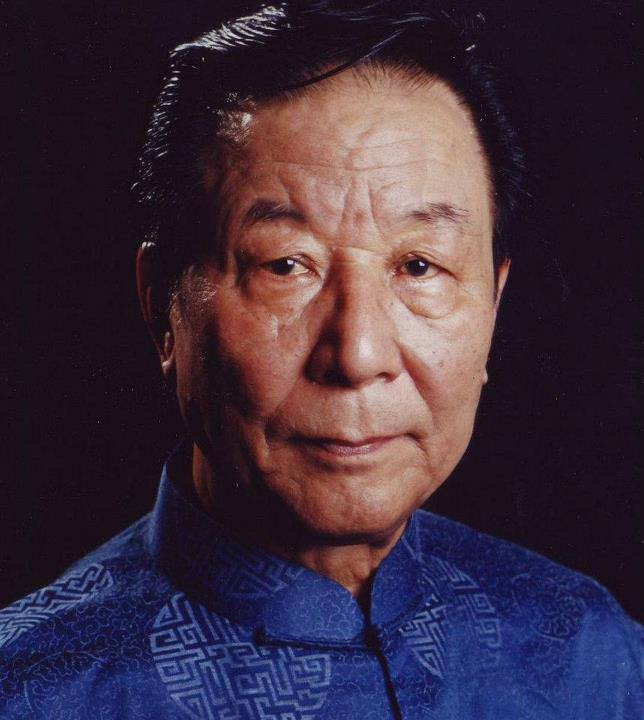
Grandmaster Ma Xianda

Ma Xianda (traditional Chinese: 馬賢達; simplified Chinese: 马贤达; pinyin: Mǎ Xiándá; 1932 – 17 June 2013, Xiao'erjing: ﻣَﺎ ﺷِﯿًﺎ دَاْ), wushu Ninth Duan, was a prominent Chinese martial arts master known for championing the combat and fighting aspects of traditional Chinese martial arts and sanda, as opposed to the performance aspects of modern wushu. Ma was a leading practitioner of his family's martial arts system, Ma Style Tongbeiquan (not to be confused with the distinct style Tongbeiquan, in which "bei" is a different Chinese character), which is composed of four traditional styles of wushu: Fanziquan, Piguaquan, Bajiquan, and Chuojiao. As of May 2002, when Kung Fu Magazine interviewed him around his 70th birthday, Ma was one of only four living masters (and the youngest) to have achieved the highest level of wushu, Ninth Duan.

Compared to most Chinese martial arts masters, Ma was unique in that he was one of the first Chinese to study the western martial sports of boxing, wrestling, and fencing. He often drew parallels between traditional Chinese and western principles of combat.

Ma was recognized as one of China's "Top Ten Professors of Chinese Martial Arts" in 1995.

As a leading practitioner, dedicated teacher, and influential scholar, Ma Xianda made a profound impact on the theory and practice of Chinese martial arts that continues to pervade the wushu community today.

== Early life ==
In 1932, Ma Xianda was born in Hebei to a Muslim Hui family with a longstanding background in Chinese martial arts. As the Ma family had studied and practiced martial arts for six generations, Ma Xianda learned from his father, Ma Fengtu, and uncle, Ma Yingtu. Both were also noted masters.

In 1952, the first Chinese martial arts championship was held after the founding of the People's Republic of China in 1949. At the young age of 19, Ma won three titles in the following fighting and performance events:

1. Lei Tai Champion (by defeating Tongbei master Deng Hongzhao and Chuojiao master Li Xuewen)
2. Short Weapon Fighting Champion
3. Wushu Performance Grand Champion

In 1953, Ma won the Huabei Short Weapon Tournament by winning every bout against competitors from Beijing, Tianjin, Hebei, Shaanxi, and Inner Mongolia.

== Career ==
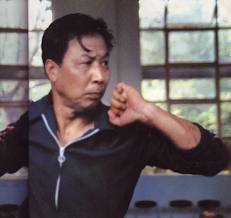
Grandmaster Ma Xianda in a Bajiquan stance.

Ma Xianda's early wushu training and strong competition record prepared him for a lifelong career in Chinese martial arts. After graduating from Hebei Normal University, Ma took a position at Xi'an Physical Education University, where he became a full professor and taught wushu, boxing, and fencing.

As a wushu professor, Ma wrote many books and papers on wushu. He edited the Zhongguo Wushu Da Cidian (Chinese Wushu Encyclopedia). For such tireless contributions, in 1995, Ma was recognized as one of China's "Top Ten Professors of Chinese Martial Arts." And in 1998, Ma was recognized as the youngest ever wushu Ninth Duan.

== Students ==
During his career, Ma estimates that he has taught nearly 10,000 students, both Chinese and non-Chinese. While the sheer number of Ma's students is incredible, it is more important to note that many of his students attained a high skill level in martial arts, with over twenty of his close students earning the coveted title of Wu Ying, or "martial hero" (a term used to identify athletes who have repeatedly placed in the top three positions at Chinese national martial arts competitions).

Below are some of Ma Xianda's most notable students:

- Ma Yue (son), wushu master and former taolu champion
- Ma Lun (son), sanda coach and former sanda champion
- Bai Hongshun, wushu Eighth Duan and former head of Xi'an Physical Education University's wushu department
- Bai Wenxiang, coach of Shaanxi Wushu Team and wushu champion Zhao Changjun
- Gao Xi'an, supporting actor in Crouching Tiger, Hidden Dragon
- Zhao Changjun, wushu champion (Note: Zhao's main coach was Ma Xianda's student Bai Wenxiang.)
- Jet Li, wushu champion (Note: Ma Xianda taught Li what would become one of Li's favorite forms, Fanziquan. Li's main coach was Wu Bin.)
