= Ma Yue =

Martial artist

Ma Yue (Xiao'erjing: ﻣَﺎ ﻳُﻮٔ) was born in 1959 in Hebei, to a Muslim Hui family whose association with martial arts goes back six generations.

As a five-year-old, his father Ma Xianda took him to train with his grandfather, Ma Fengtu where he learned his family styles tongbeiquan, piguaquan, fanziquan, bajiquan, and cuojiao. At the age of 11, Ma Yue won the Xi'an city and Shaanxi province all-around championships and beat renowned International Wushu champion Zhao Changjun.

In 1983, he won a four gold awards, placing firsts in fanzi, pigua, short weapon and straight sword. Ma Yue has since had a long career in the martial arts. He is a Chinese National Wushu Champion, two-time gold medallist and a graduate of Wushu University of China.
