= Armance =

Armance may refer to:

- Armance (novel), an 1827 romance novel by Stendhal
- Armance (river), a tributary of the Armançon in France
