= Li Shuwen =

Chinese martial artist

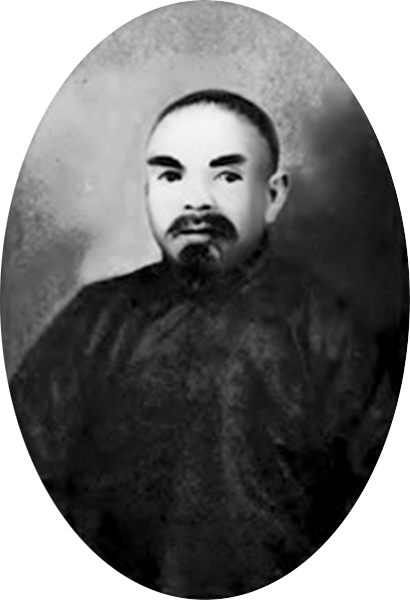
- Born: 1864; Qing Dynasty, Wangnanliang Village/Shazhangzhuang Village in Cangzhou
- Died: January 24, 1934 (aged 69–70); Republic of China, Weixian County, Shandong Province or Tianjin Xiaozhan Town
- Other names: "God Spear Li"
- Style: Bajiquan
- Teacher(s): Huang Sihai, Zhang Jingxing

Other information
- Notable students: Huo Diange, Zhang Xiangwu, Liu Yunqiao, Li Etang, others

Li Shuwen (Chinese: 李書文) (1864–1934) was a master practitioner of the Chinese martial art of Bajiquan. He was known as "God Spear Li" (神槍李). His prowess was said to be such that he boasted that he did not have to strike the same opponent twice. He was a martial arts adviser of Fu Zhensong, notably once fighting him to a draw. Li's students eventually became personal bodyguards for Mao Zedong, Chiang Kai-shek, and Puyi.

While not due to malicious intent, Li Shuwen killed many people during his life in either martial arts matches or self defense, causing victims' relatives to hold a grudge. He died after consuming poisonous tea served by one of them. Regardless, his reputation as one of the world's greatest martial artists persists to this day.

== In fiction ==
Li Shuwen is depicted as a Servant, a type of familiar, in the Fate franchise, beginning with Fate/Extra. He also shows up in other Fate works, such as Fate/Type Redline, Fate/Samurai Remnant, and Fate/Grand Order. The franchise features several versions; he is depicted as a young or older man depending on the story, and due to Servants being subject to character classes, he is either a Lancer or Assassin.

The Japanese manga Kenji depicted Li Shuwen according to numerous accounts from various sources, notably from Li Shuwen's last student Liu Yunqiao.
