= Su Yu-chang =

Taiwanese martial artist and physician

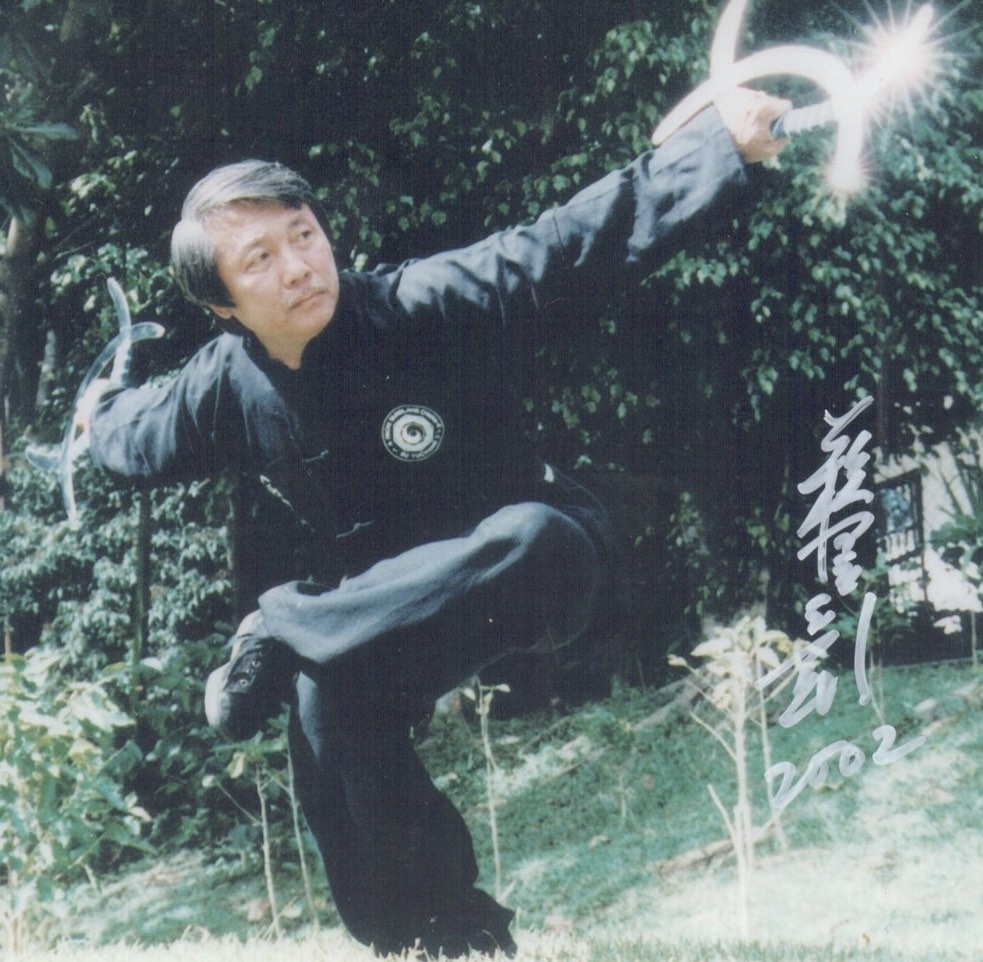
- An autographed picture of Su in 1997, performing baguazhang
- Born: 24 June 1940; Dongshan, Tainan, Taiwan
- Died: 29 April 2019 (aged 78); La Palma, Canary Islands, Spain
- Citizenship: Taiwan
- Occupations: Martial artist; physician
- Martial arts career
- Style: Kung fu
- Teachers: Liu Yunqiao (baguazhang, bajiquan, piguaquan, tai chi); Li Kunshan (李崑山) (Qishing Tanglang, Meihua Tanglang); Zhang Dekui (Pimen Tanglang); Sang Danqi (xingyiquan); Wei Xiaotang 衛笑堂 (Babu Tanglang, Wu-style tai chi)

Other information
- Notable school: Pachi Tanglang International

Chinese name
- Traditional Chinese: 蘇昱彰
- Simplified Chinese: 苏昱彰
Transcriptions
Standard Mandarin
- Hanyu Pinyin: Sū Yùzhāng
- Website: Pachi Tanglang International

Su Yu-chang (Chinese: 蘇昱彰; pinyin: Sū Yùzhāng; 24 June 1940 – 29 April 2019), was a Taiwanese martial artist, scholar and practitioner of traditional Chinese medicine who devoted his life to teaching kung fu, traditional Chinese philosophy and medicine all over the world.

== Life and career ==
Su's father, Su Cheng-sheng (蘇正生), was one of the members of the legendary Taiwanese Kano baseball team. Su started his studies of kung fu at the age of eight under Praying Mantis Master Chang Tekuei, who came to work as a foreigner from mainland China and taught him mizongyi and Pimen Northern Praying Mantis. After studying with other famous masters, he became from 1963 a notable disciple of Liu Yunqiao, founder of the Wutan Center for the Promotion of Chinese Wushu (武壇國術推廣中心), an institution to which he gave international continuity in the form of the Pachi Tanglang Martial Arts Institute (八極螳螂武藝總舘), with branches worldwide.

In 1976, Su travelled to Venezuela, where he settled in Caracas. He started a practice of Chinese traditional medicine and started teaching several styles of kung fu. Initially he taught jointly with fellow expatriate Dai Shizhe (戴士哲) at La danza del dragón school, and some time after he founded the Instituto Pachimen (八極門). During this period, he served as vice-president of the South American Martial Arts Federation. In 1989 he travelled to Mallorca, where he founded the first European branch of his institute, now rebranded Pachi Tanglang Martial Arts Institute. Shortly thereafter a Barcelona branch opened, and in 1992 Master Su was hired to train special security teams for the Olympic Games in Barcelona. In the following years, new branches of the school were opened in Tokyo, New York, the Netherlands, Norway and the UK. Master Su would spend time doing the rounds of his institute's branches around the world, securing the transmission for posterity of the wealth of knowledge he had accumulated.

In later years, Su returned to his native Taiwan, where he strengthened the Taipei and Kaohsiung branches of the school, and from where he would continue to travel extensively. He died in La Palma, Canary Islands, in April 2019.

== Works ==
Master Su published a number of well received books on martial arts, mostly compiled from his lessons in Spanish, Japanese and English, as well as several video recordings on teachings of Bagua Quan, Baji Quan and several Praying Mantis substyles.

=== Bibliography ===
- Pachi Tanglang Chuan: Eight Ultimate Praying Mantis, Pachi Tanglang International, 2014. ISBN 978-8-230326-50-3
- I Ching: el oráculo, Madrid, Visión Libros, 2012. ISBN 978-8-490113-77-6
- Taichi Chuan to Awaken the Power of the Qi (気の力を覚醒させる太極拳), Tokyo, Budo-RA Books, 2009. ISBN 978-4-8094-0816-8
- Secret Method of Praying Mantis Style (螳螂拳秘法), Tokyo, Budo-RA Books, 2007. ISBN 978-4-8094-0640-9
- Pachi Tanglang Chuan, Madrid, Visión Libros, 2006. ISBN 978-8-498214-35-2
- Yang Taichi Chuan, Madrid, Visión Net, 2005. ISBN 978-8-497709-59-0
- The Invisible Web: A Taichi Chuan Manual, Palma de Mallorca, Asociación Europea Pachi Tanglang Chuan y Tao, 1998. ISBN 978-8-486876-90-6
- El tejido invisible: Manual de Taichi Chuan, Palma de Mallorca, Prensa Universitaria, 1995. ISBN 978-8-486876-78-4
- Pachi Tang Lang Chuen, Barcelona, Alas, 1990. ISBN 978-8-420302-48-5
