= November (novella) =

Novella by Gustave Flaubert

- Author: Gustave Flaubert
- Original title: Novembre
- Language: French
- Published: 1842
- Publication place: France

November (French: Novembre) was Gustave Flaubert's first completed work, a novella first completed in 1842.

== Synopsis ==
In the first part of the novella, the narrator is a schoolboy, and the narrative consists of his meditations on life, as well as his longing for sexual awakening and the beginning of his adult life. He perceives himself as a voyeur, witnessing couples, sumptuous dining rooms, professionals at work and scenes of family life.

In the second part, the young author loses his virginity with Marie, a worldly-wise courtesan who recounts her personal story of erotic experience. Initially, she was a virginal sixteen-year-old until she was unwillingly married to an elderly suitor who wanted a younger mistress. In return for her acquiescence, though, she has acquired sexual freedom and experience. However, as the reader later learns, she subsequently becomes a tabula rasa, providing her body for the enjoyment of men, but not her individuality or personality.

In the concluding section of the novella, the adolescent narrator tries to revisit Marie, but the courtesan and her brothel of residence have vanished. The narrator takes up study toward a legal career, but has already eschewed marriage or professional life. Eventually, he dies.

== Translations ==
1. Frank Jellinek (1932), published by Roman Press, edited by Francis Steegmuller for Michael Joseph (1966), reissued by Hesperus Press with a foreword by Nadine Gordimer (2005).
2. Andrew Brown (2002), published by Alma Classics (formerly Oneworld Classics)

== Literary antecedents ==
In his biography of Flaubert, Frederick Brown compares the narrator to other literary adolescents, such as Chateaubriand's René (1802), Abbé Prévost's Chevalier des Grieux (1731), Goethe's Werther (1734), Musset's Octave and others, who also fail to become adults due to their inability to reach psychological maturity, although parents are not mentioned in November, unlike similar contemporary works. Brown concludes that it is a work of authorial adolescence.

Marie, in Frederick Brown's interpretation, is understood to be a fictionalised rendition of Eulalie Foucauld, the thirty-five-year-old Toulon innkeeper who provided Flaubert with his own sexual initiation in 1840.
