= Adam Hsu =

Chinese martial artist

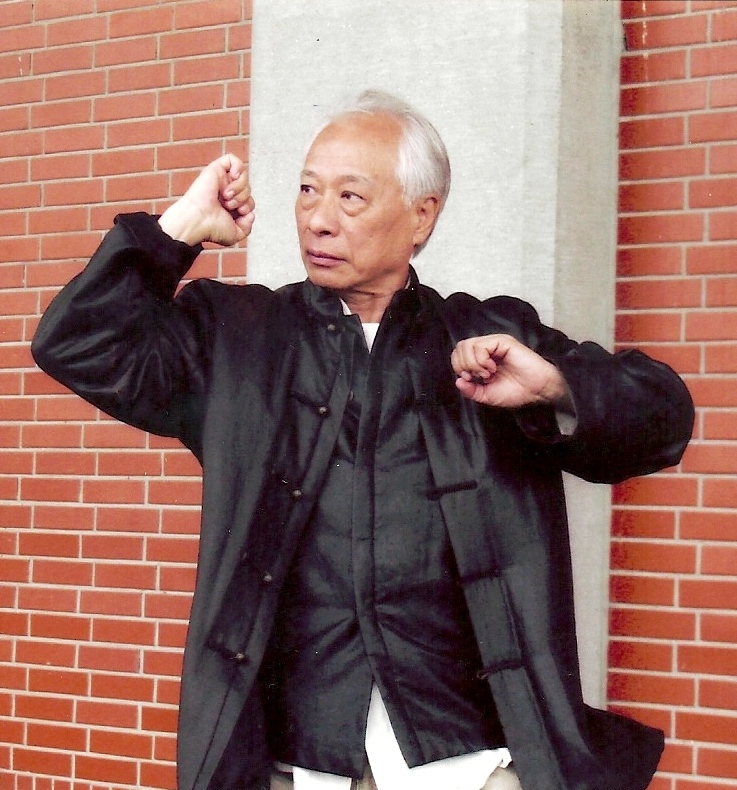
- Adam Hsu demonstrating Bajiquan postures in August 2015.

Personal information
- Native name: Hsu, Chi
- Born: 1941 (age 84–85) Republic of China Nantong, Jiangsu Province
- Education: Department of Chinese Literature, Soochow University; Graduated from the Chinese Institute of National Taiwan Normal University; Soochow University; National Taiwan Normal University
- Occupations: Martial Arts instructor, writer, essayist
- Website: and
- Updated on May 13th 2021

Hau, Chi (Adam Hsu)
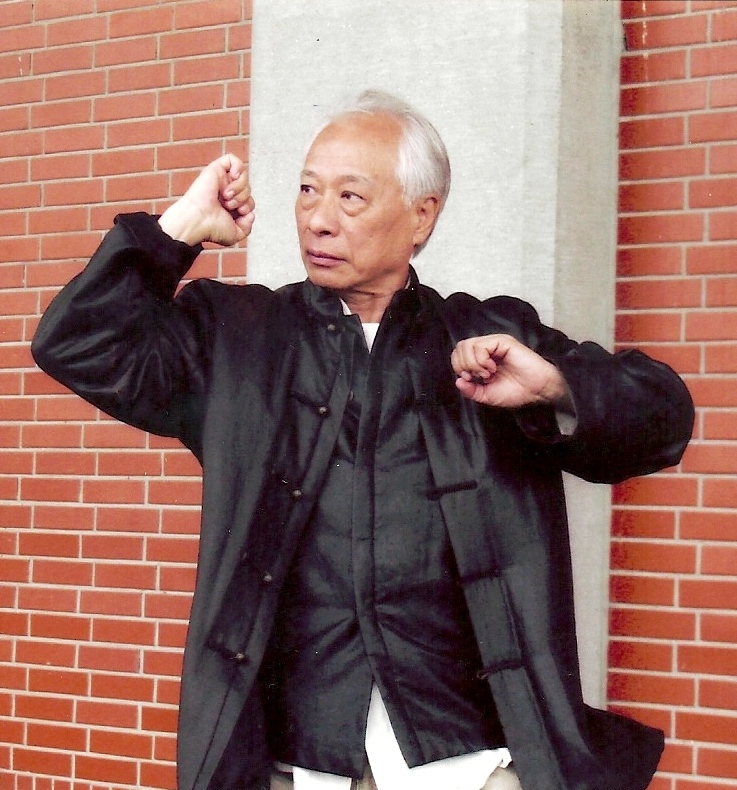
- Style: Bajiquan; Changquan (Jiaomen, Meihua and Taizu styles), Northern Praying Mantis (Eight-step, Plum Blossom and Six Harmony styles), Xingyiquan; Piguazhang; Baguazhang (Shandong Palace Style Bagua Palm); Chen-style taijiquan (old frame and Sudden Thunder frame); Weapons: dāo, jiàn, gùn, qiāng, Yang Ling Dao
- Teachers: Liu Yun Qiao (Note: Bajiquan, Piguazhang, Baguazhang, Mizongquan); Han Qingtang (Note: Jiàomén Chǎngquán, Méihuā Chǎngquán, dāo, jiàn, gùn, qiāng); Cao Lianfang (Note: Xingyiquan); Wei Xiaotang (Note: Eight-step praying mantis boxing); Zhang Xiangsan: (Note: Liuhe Tanglangquan/Six Harmony Prating Mantis); Li Kunshan (Note: Plum Blossom Mantis Boxing); Du Yuze (Note: Chen style Taijiquan old frame, sudden thunder frame.); Cháng Dōngshēng: (Note: Bǎodìng kuài jiāo)

Hsu, Chi (simplified Chinese: 徐纪; traditional Chinese: 徐紀 born December 14, 1941), commonly known as Adam Hsu is a martial artist and essayist known for his expertise in various forms of Chinese martial arts. Hsu was born in mainland China in 1941 and later moved to Taiwan, where he has operated for most of his life.

== Background ==
Hsu was born in 1941 in People's Republic of China, either in Shanghai or Nantong, Jiangsu Province. He has practiced martial arts since childhood. He moved to Taiwan in 1949. There, he studied under many masters of Chinese martial arts, including Liu Yun Qiao.

He first began teaching martial arts at "Taiwan Wutan National Martial Arts Promotion Center" (台湾武壇国術推広中心) in Taipei, Taiwan. From 1978, he moved his activity base to the United States and opened a Wushu school at Sidney. Later, he started teaching martial arts in United States, at San Francisco Chuangwu School.

== Lineage ==
Hsu's martial lineage is as follows:

Bagua Zhang Dong Hai Chuan > Yin Fu > Kung Po Tien > Lieu Yun Chiao > Adam Hsu

Baji Quan Chen Ming Chi > Chin Tien Sheng > Li ShuWen > Liu YunChiao > Adam Hsu

Chang Quan, Jiao Men & Tan Tui Shen Mo Lim > Han Ching Tang > Adam Hsu

Mizong Quan Chang Yao Ting > Liu Yun Chiao > Adam Hsu

Pigua Zhang Chang Ke Ming > Huang Szu Hai > Li ShuWen > Liu YunChiao > Adam Hsu

Tang Lang Quan (Seven Star and Plum Blossom) Wong Tzu Ching > Change Te Kwei > Adam Hsu

Tang Lang Quan (Eight Step) Kiang Hua Lon > Fang Huan Yi > Wei Xiao Tang > Adam Hsu

Taiji Quan (Chen) Chen Chang Xin > Chen Keng Yun > Chen Yen Xi > Du Yu Zi> Adam Hsu

== Teaching experience ==
- Lecturer in the National Martial Arts course of the Sports Department of National Taiwan Normal University, Taipei Normal College, and Political Warfare School.
- Instructor of National Taiwan Normal University and Taipei Teachers College.
- Research committee member of the Chinese Academy of Chinese Academy of Sciences Research Institute.
- Lectures from the National Martial Arts Group, Department of Physical Education, Chinese Culture University
- Lecturer of the teaching materials of Chinese martial arts for the elementary school teacher seminar (Panqiao).
- Lecturer of Chinese Traditional Teaching Materials for Middle School Teachers' Seminar (Changhua).
- Lecturer in the National Skills of the Young Lion Camp of the National Salvation Corps of the Taiwan Provincial Government Training Corps.
- Touring lecturer of elementary school physical education teaching materials of Taiwan Provincial Department of Education.
- Lecturer of the National Primary School Physical Education Teaching Material Seminar of the Taipei City Education Bureau.
- The melee combat training instructors and supervisors of the units directly under the First Corps.
- Head coach of Wutan National Martial Arts Promotion Center.
- Guidance of the Chinese martial arts class for overseas Chinese in Normal University.
- Martial arts teacher in the Republic of Liberia.
- Founder and head coach of San Francisco Zhige Wushu School.
- Founder and head coach of San Francisco New Era Martial Arts Center.
- Teacher of the martial arts group of San Francisco Qingliu Club Summer Youth Activity.
- Founder of Jianli Gongfa School.
- Amber China Wushu choreographer.
- Boxing teacher of Cloud Gate Dance Theatre.
- Director of Junior Martial Arts in Cloud Gate Dance Classroom.

== Martial Arts Career ==
Training After being relocated to Taiwan in 1949, Hsu spent the following 25 years learning under several different masters. Although his principal teacher was Liu Yun Chiao, he had also studied under Han Ching Tan (Jiao Men or Muslim Style, Tan Tui and others), Du Yi Zi (Chen Tai Chi), Cao Lian Fang (Xing Yi), Li Kun Shan (7 Star Mantis), Wei Xiao Tang (8 Step Mantis) and Chang Xiang San (6 Harmony Mantis). His relationship with Liu is noted as being particularly close, and some have said him to be one of the best representatives of Liu's teachings.[1]

America Adam Hsu began teaching in America in 1978

He would later return to China with students (including Liu Chang Chiang) in 1990 and 1991, to visit the birth places and of baji, chang quan, tang lang quan, Chen taiji quan, and other martial arts systems. During this time, in 1990, he founded the Traditional Wushu Association, a non-profit, international organization.

== Writing ==
=== Books ===
Also an established author, Hsu has written a number of books about martial arts in English and Chinese, and over a hundred articles in English, Chinese, Japanese, Spanish, Italian, Russian, and German.

- One Sword Points to Frosted Sky: Kungfu Practicing Notes Part 7 (Chinese) 2021 Morning Sun Publishing
- Bā jí xīn fǎ (Baji Method) (Simplified Chinese) 2020
- What is the fear of a strong man: Kungfu and Practicing Notes No. 6 (Chinese) 2020 Morning Sun Publishing
- Life Is Too Short For Bad Kungfu (English) 2019 ISBN 978-1939278142
- Yun Qiao My Master: Fifteen Years of Letters from America (Chinese) 2019 Morning Sun Publishing
- "Whistling the Long Sword: Kungfu Practicing Notes Part 5"(Chinese) 2018 Morning Sun Publishing
- "Swordsmanship: Kungfu Practicing Notes Part 4" (Chinese) 2017 Morning Sun Publishing
- "Autumn Water Heng at the Waist: Kungfu and Practicing Notes 3" 2015 Morning Sun Publishing
- <Sancai Sword> (Chinese) 2014
- 〈Ten Forms of Tan-Tuai〉(Chinese) 2013
- Linking Legs Vol. 3 (Chinese Story Book) 2013
- "Looking at Wu Gou-Essays on Chinese Martial Arts Vol. 4" (Chinese) 2013 Morning Sun Publishing
- "One Hundred Thousand Miles-Essays on Chinese Martial Arts Vol. 3" (Chinese) 2013 Morning Sun Publishing
- "A Small Stab at Sword Studies: Kungfu and Practicing Notes No. 2" (Chinese) 2013 Morning Sun Publishing
- "Stars Reflecting from My Sword: Kungfu and Practicing Notes No. 1" (Chinese) 2011
- Linking Fist Storybook Vol. 2 (Chinese Story Book) 2011
- The Linking Fist Vol. 1 (Chinese Story Book) 2011
- Essays on Chinese Martial Arts Vol. 2 (Chinese) 2004 Morning Sun Publishing
- Essays on Chinese Martial Arts Vol. 1 (Chinese) 2002 Morning Sun Publishing
- 1000 Miles without Rest (Chinese) 1998 Morning Sun Publishing
- Lone Sword Against The Cold Cold Sky, 2006/2007 (English) ISBN 978-0979015915
- Sword Polisher's Record, (English) 1997 ISBN 978-0804831383

=== Columns and essays ===
- Editor of "Wulin Celebrities in Mainland China".
- Specially written and written by "Wulin" magazine in Mainland China.
- Special correspondent and columnist of "Shaolin and Tai Chi" magazine in the United States of Mainland China.
- Columnist and special author of Japanese "Bujutsu" magazine.
- Columnist for the American Black Belt magazine.
- American "Inside Kung Fu" magazine, special selection.
- Columnist of American <Wu Shu Kung Fu> (Martial Arts Kung Fu) Magazine.
- Columnist for American "Martial Art Training" (Martial Art Training) magazine.
- Member of the compiling committee of the national sports textbook and national martial arts curriculum of the National Institute of * Compilation and Translation.
- Editor-in-chief of the Department of Physical Education, Ministry of Education, "Collection of Historical Materials on Martial Arts".
- Editor-in-chief and president of "Wu Tan" magazine.
- "Changchun" monthly columnist.
- United Daily News Family Edition columnist.
- Columnist for "Future Youth Monthly", Vision World Culture Publishing Co., Ltd. Since 2017

== See also ==
- Ryuchi Matsuda
- Chinese martial arts
