= Bouvard and Pécuchet =

Unfinished 1881 novel by Gustave Flaubert

Bouvard et Pécuchet
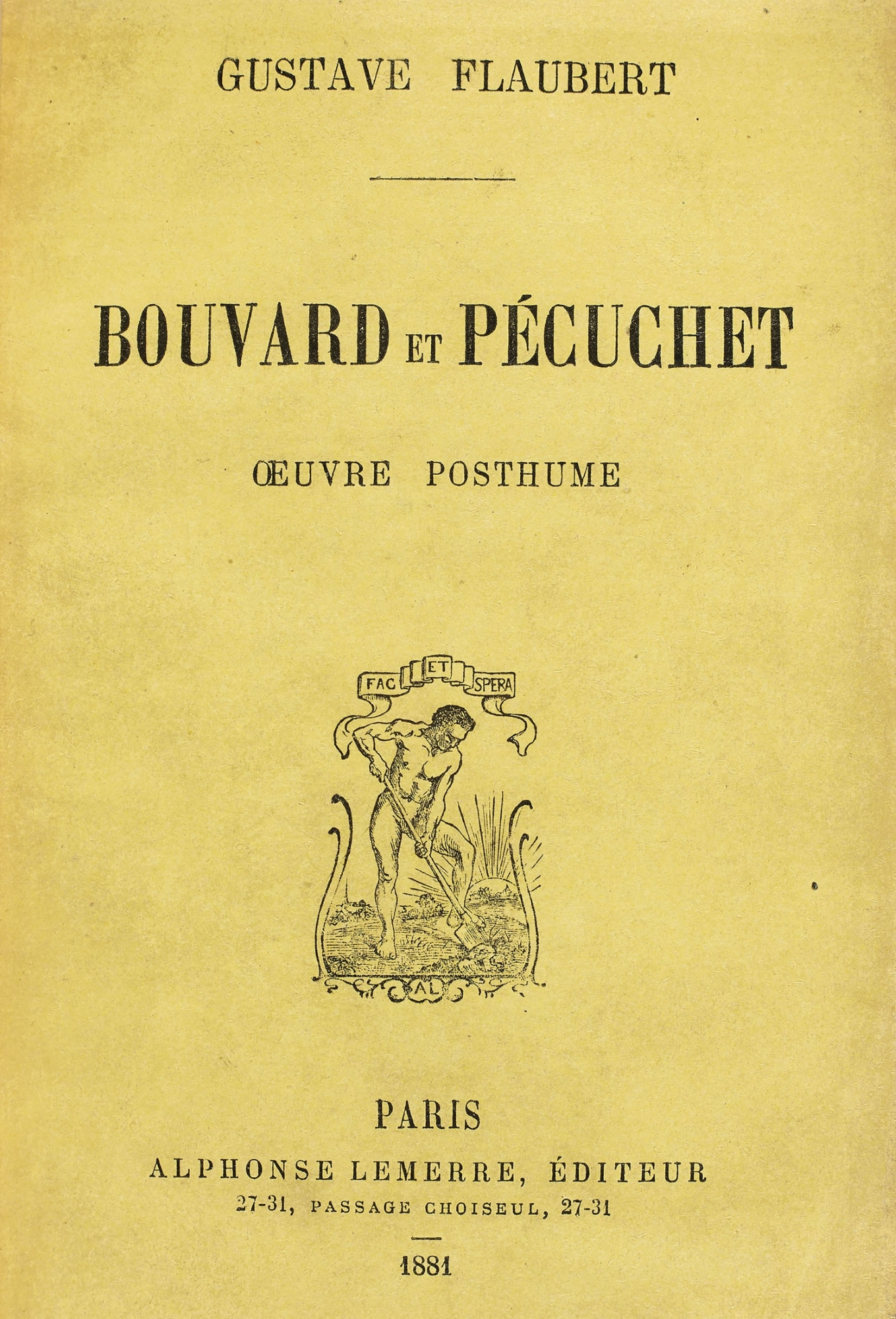
- First edition (1881)
- Author: Gustave Flaubert
- Language: French
- Genre: Satirical novel, encyclopedic novel
- Publisher: Alphonse Lemerre
- Publication date: 1881
- Publication place: France
- English publication date: 1896
- Media type: Print (Hardback & Paperback)

Bouvard et Pécuchet (French pronunciation: [buvaʁ e pekyʃɛ]) is an unfinished satirical novel by Gustave Flaubert, published in 1881 after his death in 1880.

== Background ==
The book was conceived in 1863 as Les Deux Cloportes ("The Two Woodlice"), partially inspired by a short story by Barthélemy Maurice, Les Deux Greffiers ("The Two Court Clerks"), which appeared in La Revue des Tribunaux in 1841 but may not have been read by Flaubert until 1858. He began a concerted effort on the project around 1872, when financial ruin threatened.

Flaubert wanted the book to be his masterpiece, surpassing all his other works, and became so obsessed with it that he read, he claimed, more than 1,500 books in preparation. He set aside its composition only once, taking a break in 1875–77 to write Three Tales. When Flaubert died in 1880, Bouvard et Pécuchet was still unfinished. It was published the following year. Reviews were tepid; neither the book's message nor its structural devices impressed critics.

== Plot summary ==
Bouvard et Pécuchet details the adventures of two Parisian copy-clerks, François Denys Bartholomée Bouvard and Juste Romain Cyrille Pécuchet, of the same age and nearly identical temperament. They meet one hot summer day in 1838 by the canal Saint-Martin and form an instant, symbiotic friendship. When Bouvard inherits a sizable fortune, the two decide to move to the countryside. They find a 94-acre (380,000 m^{2}) property near the town of Chavignolles in Normandy, between Caen and Falaise, and 100 miles (160 km) west of Rouen. Their search for intellectual stimulation leads them, over the course of years, to flounder through almost every branch of knowledge.

Flaubert uses their quest to expose the hidden weaknesses of the sciences and arts, as nearly every project Bouvard and Pécuchet set their minds on comes to grief. Their endeavours are interleaved with the story of their deteriorating relations with the local villagers; and the Revolution of 1848 is the occasion for much despondent discussion. The manuscript breaks off near the end of the novel. According to one set of Flaubert's notes, the townsfolk, enraged by Bouvard and Pécuchet's antics, try to force them out of the area, or have them committed. Disgusted with the world in general, Bouvard and Pécuchet ultimately decide to "return to copying as before" (copier comme autrefois), giving up their intellectual blundering. The work ends with their eager preparations to construct a two-seated desk on which to write.

This was originally intended to be followed by a large sample of what they copy out: possibly a sottisier (anthology of stupid quotations), the Dictionary of Received Ideas (encyclopedia of commonplace notions), or a combination of both.

== Structure ==
The work resembles the earlier Sentimental Education in that the plot structure is episodic, giving it a picaresque quality. Since Bouvard and Pécuchet rarely persevere with any subject beyond their first disappointments, they are perpetually rank beginners: the lack of real achievement and the constant forward movement through time (as shown during the rapid political changes from 1848 to 1851) create a strong sense of tension in the work.

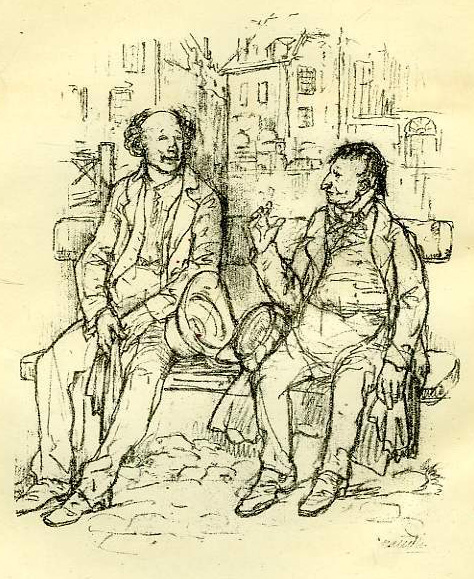
Illustration by Bernard Naudin, 1923

- Chapter 1. Meeting; friendship; Bouvard's inheritance (1838–41)
- Chapter 2. Agriculture; landscape gardening; food preservation (March 1841 – autumn 1842)
- Chapter 3. Chemistry; anatomy; medicine; biology; geology
- Chapter 4. Archeology; architecture; history (a study of the Duc d'Angoulême); mnemonics
- Chapter 5. Literature; drama; grammar; aesthetics
- Chapter 6. Politics (25 February 1848)
- Chapter 7. Love
- Chapter 8. Gymnastics, spiritualism, hypnotism, Swedenborgianism, magic; theology; philosophy; they consider suicide; Christmas
- Chapter 9. Religion
- Chapter 10. Education (Victor and Victorine); music; urban planning; arguments with everyone nearby
- Likely ending. Speeches at the Golden Cross Inn; futurism; they narrowly escape prison; the desk for two

== Major themes ==
Nowhere does Flaubert's exploration of the relation of signs to the objects they signify receive a more thorough treatment than in this work. Bouvard and Pécuchet systematically confuse signs and symbols with reality, an assumption that causes them much suffering, as it does for Emma Bovary and Frédéric Moreau. Yet here, due to the explicit focus on books and knowledge, Flaubert's ideas reach a climax.

The relentless failure of Bouvard and Pécuchet to learn anything from their adventures raises the question of what is knowable. Whenever they achieve some small measure of success (a rare occurrence), it is the result of unknown external forces beyond their comprehension. In this sense, they strongly resemble Anthony in The Temptation of Saint Anthony, a work which addresses similar epistemological themes as they relate to classical literature. Lionel Trilling wrote that the novel expresses a belief in the alienation of human thought from human experience. The worldview that emerges from the work, one of human beings proceeding relentlessly forward without comprehending the results of their actions or the processes of the world around them, does not seem an optimistic one. However, given that Bouvard and Pécuchet do gain some comprehension of humanity's ignorant state (as demonstrated by their composition of the Dictionary of Received Ideas), it can be argued Flaubert allows for the chance of relative enlightenment.

In Bouvard et Pécuchet, Gustave Flaubert made fun of 18th- and 19th-century attempts to catalogue, classify, list, and record all of scientific and historical knowledge. In October 1872, he wrote, the novel is "a kind of encyclopedia made into a farce... I am planning a thing in which I give vent to my anger... I shall vomit over my contemporaries the disgust they inspire in me... It will be big and violent." It is possible that the stress contributed to his death as he was drawing near to the conclusion of the novel. In 1874, he confessed to George Sand "[it] is leading me very quietly, or rather relentlessly, to the abode of the shades. It will be the death of me!"

== Literary significance and criticism ==
Ezra Pound wrote "Flaubert having recorded provincial customs in Madame Bovary and city habits in the Sentimental Education, set out to complete his record of nineteenth century life by presenting all sorts of things that the average man of the period would have had in his head." Pound compared Bouvard et Pécuchet to Joyce's Ulysses.

Julian Barnes said that it "requires a stubborn reader, one willing to suspend normal expectations and able to confront both repetitious effects and a vomitorium of pre-digested book learning."

In his essay "Vindication of Bouvard and Pécuchet", Jorge Luis Borges writes that Flaubert, the author who "forged the realist novel, was also the first to shatter it." He compares the novel with the satirical parables of Jonathan Swift and Voltaire and thinks that it anticipates Franz Kafka's absurdism.

== English translations ==
=== Public Domain ===
1. D. F. Hannigan (H. S. Nichols, 1896)
2. T. W. Earp and G. W. Stonier (Jonathan Cape, 1936)

=== In Copyright ===
1. Alban J. Krailsheimer (Penguin, 1976)
2. Mark Polizzotti (Dalkey Archive, 2005)

== Screen adaptations ==
- Bouvard et Pécuchet (1971), directed by Robert Valey.
- Byli jednou dva písaři (1972), Czechoslovak TV series directed by Ján Roháč with Jiří Sovák and Miroslav Horníček as Bouvard and Pécuchet respectively
- Bouvard et Pécuchet (1990), directed by Jean-Daniel Verhaeghe.
