= Fate/Extra =

2010 video game

- Cover for the North American version release, featuring Rin Tohsaka (left), Nero Claudius (center) and Nameless/Archer (right)
- Created by: Kinoko Nasu; Type-Moon; Marvelous
- Video game
- Developer: Type-Moon; Imageepoch
- Publisher: JP: Marvelous Entertainment; NA: Aksys Games; EU: Ghostlight
- Music by: Shinji Hosoe
- Genre: Role-playing game
- Platform: PlayStation Portable
- Released: JP: July 22, 2010; NA: November 21, 2011; PAL: May 4, 2012
- Manga
- Written by: Robi〜na
- Published by: Kadokawa Shoten
- Magazine: Comptiq
- Original run: May 2011 – December 2014
- Volumes: 6
- Anime television series

Last Encore
- Directed by: Yukihiro Miyamoto; Akiyuki Shinbo
- Produced by: Shizuka Kurosaki (Aniplex); Yoshiaki Matsumoto (Marvelous)
- Written by: Kinoko Nasu; Hikaru Sakurai
- Music by: Satoru Kōsaki
- Studio: Shaft
- Licensed by: NA: Aniplex of America (Licensing)
- Original network: Tokyo MX, GTV, GYT, BS11, MBS
- Original run: January 28, 2018 – July 29, 2018
- Episodes: 13

Fate/Extra (Note: Stylized as Fate/EXTRA) is a dungeon crawler role-playing game developed by Type-Moon and Imageepoch and published by Marvelous Entertainment. It was first released for the PlayStation Portable in Japan on July 22, 2010. The game takes place in a parallel universe to the visual novel Fate/stay night. Aksys Games localized the game for North America and released it on November 21, 2011. Three editions of the game were released in North America: a Limited Edition, a retail standard edition, and a PlayStation Network downloadable version. On May 4, 2012, Ghostlight released the game in PAL territories.

The story follows Hakuno Kishinami awakens with amnesia in a strange virtual world. Alongside their "Servant", they are forced to battle to the death to earn the opportunity to have a wish granted. They both search for a mysterious object known as the "Holy Grail".

Fate/Extra was followed by a companion game, Fate/Extra CCC. Instead of being a direct sequel, CCC is described as an alternate route of the Extra storyline's development.

The game was followed by Fate/Extella: The Umbral Star in 2016. An anime adaptation of the first game was produced by Shaft and aired on Tokyo MX and affiliate stations from January 28 to July 29, 2018. A remake of the first game, Fate/Extra Record, is under development by Type-Moon Studio BB.

== Gameplay ==
An example of Fate/Extra's turn-based battle system. Empty boxes correspond to the appropriate commands the player needs to input to overcome the opponent's commands. The characters featured are female Hakuno Kishinami (left) and Saber Nero (right).

Fate/Extra is a single-player three-dimensional Japanese role-playing game in the dungeon subgenre. The game features two main modes: "Arena", in which the player fights against AI opponents, and "Academy", which is storyline-driven.

During battles, the player's character, called the Master, directs their Servant to reduce their opponent's health points to zero. Battles take place as isolated in-game events with a single opponent (either a dweller or another Servant). A fight consists of separate sections, and before each of them begins, the Master is asked to select a sequence of six actions for the Servant to execute on the playing field while the enemy retaliates.

There are three main types of interaction: "Attack", "Protection", and "Breakthrough". After the series of actions is chosen by each side of the battle, they are compared against each other before the defeated side is damaged. In the case of three consecutive successful actions, the character is provided with an additional attack that does not take into account the resistance of the enemy. In addition to the main interactions, servant characters have special types of attacks called "noble phantasms", which require the expenditure of magic energy points.

With the help of permanent effect items and code spells—magic that enhances certain characteristics of the Servants, which allows Masters to maintain their Servants.

The arena is a dungeon filled with AI enemies. When all enemies are defeated, the player is rewarded with experience points and in-game currency. During one game week, the player is offered two mandatory quests, consisting of finding items in the territory of Arena levels. If these missions are completed within the prescribed period, the player is allowed to battle with an enemy servant controlled by artificial intelligence at the beginning of the next game week. When a certain number of battles are held with a certain type of opponent, the player gets the opportunity to see part of the opponent's action combination before choosing their own series of moves. Throughout the game week, the player can gain info on enemy servants through their interactions with their master in the academy. The player may also purchase items in the academy.

The dialogue system in the game is built similarly to the visual novel genre, where there is an extensive system for selecting replicas that further develop the relationship with the Servant. The main narration is also conducted through text information offered to the player, located between the stages of the active game process. If a quest is failed or a Servant is defeated in the arena, the player receives a "bad ending".

== Plot ==
The Fate/Extra storyline is set in one of the multiverses (alternate histories) of the Fate universe, and as such, it is not the same world as that of Fate/Stay Night.

In the year 2032, an object surpassing all of humanity's wisdom was discovered on the moon. Known as the Moon Cell Automaton and equivalent to the Holy Grail, it is an all-powerful wish-granting device. As the world outside suffers from magical drain and faills into ruin, organizations and forces from around the world access the spiritual virtual world created by the Automaton, called SE.RA.PH, and participate in the Holy Grail War, which the Automaton conducts to select a suitable wielder for its power.

The protagonist, Hakuno Kishinami(Name and gender customizable by the player), a student at Tsukiumihara Academy, notices something strange about the world. The reality of school life is that it is a preliminary round of the Holy Grail War run by SE.RA.PH, with a rule that if you don't regain your original memories within the time limit, you will be eliminated. The 128 participants, called Masters, significantly rely on entities called Servants, the materialized spirits of mythological or legendary figures. Aside from the mages, all other characters turn out to be NPCs with behavior programmed by a supercomputer, with strictly defined functions for interacting with living people.

The protagonist collapses and nearly dies in the final stage of the preliminaries, but is saved by a certain Servant (which a player can select from a list of three) who sees their unwavering determination, and a contract is formed, allowing them to advance to the main Holy Grail War. In the main tournament, which is conducted in a knockout format, the protagonist first faces Shinji Matou, a boy who was given the role of his best friend in the preliminaries. Their next opponent is Dan Blackmore, one of the favorites to win and a skilled soldier, and in the third round, Alice, an innocent girl who is not even aware that she is participating in the Holy Grail War. Meanwhile, Hakuno does not regain their original memories, which should have been returned to them, and they don't even know why they are fighting. Nevertheless, they set their sights on survival and defeats the opposing Masters.

Amidst all this, the protagonist happens to witness a battle between two Masters who have always looked after them, Rin Tohsaka and Rani VIII. They are saved by the protagonist, although they lose their Master status. In the fifth round, the protagonist struggles against their sworn enemy Julius Belkisk Harway, but with the help of Rin and Rani, they manages to defeat him. However, in the sixth round, they find themselves fighting against the girl who was his ally.

In the final battle, the protagonist faces off against Leonardo Vistario Harway, and his Servant, Gawain. The protagonist forms a deep bond with their Servant and finally defeats them, becoming the victor of the Holy Grail War. However, waiting for the protagonist in the heart of the Moon Cell is Twice H. Peaceman, a man who, like the protagonist, had previously survived the Holy Grail War. It is also revealed that both the protagonist and Peaceman are actually NPC AIs that became self-aware. Twice argues that it is essential to use the power of the Holy Grail to wage war for the advancement of humanity and asks the protagonist to help him use his wish for this purpose, but the protagonist refuses. After defeating Twice, the protagonist obtains the Holy Grail.

== Characters ==
In addition to characters from Fate/stay night, characters from other Type-Moon works and new ones were added to the game. While familiar characters from Fate/stay night and other Type-Moon works appear, they have many differences from their original iterations.

=== Masters ===
Hakuno Kishinami (岸波 白野, Kishinami Hakuno)
Voiced by: Atsushi Abe (Male), Yui Ishikawa (Female) (Japanese); Billy Kametz (Male), Ryan Bartley (Female) (English) (Note: Japanese voice acting is available on Fate/Extra Last Encore, Fate/Extella Link and Fate/Extra Record. English voice acting is only available on Fate/Extra Last Encore.)
Hakuno is the protagonist of Fate/Extra. He or she is the Master of Saber, Caster, or Archer, depending on who is chosen in the game. The gender of Hakuno is also unspecified, and chosen by the player at the start.
Rin Tohsaka (遠坂 凛, Tōhsaka Rin)
Voiced by: Kana Ueda (Japanese); Mela Lee (English)
A member of the Resistance who joined the Grail War to stop the Harwey family. Master of Lancer, Cú Chulainn.
Rani VIII (ラニ=VIII, Rani Eito)
Voiced by: Asami Sanada (Japanese); Christine Marie Cabanos (English)
Homunculus created by the world's last alchemist. Master of Berserker, Lu Bu. She is encountered on the second floor and assists Hakuno and Nero.
Leonardo Bistario Harwey (レオナルド・ビスタリオ・ハーウェイ, Reonarudo Bisutario Hāwei)
Voiced by: Romi Park (Japanese); Laura Stahl (English)
Leader of the plutocracy that owns 60% of the world's wealth and called the strongest Master. Master of Saber, Gawain.
Shinji Matou (間桐 シンジ, Matō Shinji)
Voiced by: Hiroshi Kamiya (Japanese); Kyle McCarley (English)
Gaming champion of Asia of 2030 and best friend of the protagonist. Master of Rider, Francis Drake.
Dan Blackmore (ダン・ブラックモア, Dan Burakkumoa)
Voiced by: Mugihito (Japanese); John Snyder (English)
Knight of England who was sent to the Grail War to win the Moon Cell. Master of Archer, Robin Hood. Antagonist of the second floor.
Alice (ありす, Arisu)
Voiced by: Ai Nonaka (Japanese); Xanthe Huynh (English)
Cyber ghost of a little girl who is already dead, but her soul is connected to the Moon Cell. Master of Caster, Nursery Rhyme.
Julius Belkisk Harwey (ユリウス・ベルキスク・ハーウェイ, Yuriusu Berukisuku Hāwei)
Voiced by: Wataru Hatano (Japanese); Jordan Reynolds (English)
Illegitimate older brother of Leo, an assassin sent to ensure that Leo will win. Master of Assassin, Li Shuwen.
Monji Gatou (臥藤 門司, Gatou Monji)
Voiced by: Kentarō Itō
A zealot who mixes various religions and views his Servant as his god. Master of Berserker, Arcueid Brunestud.
Lil' Ronnie (ランルーくん, Ran Rū-kun)
Voiced by: Yū Kobayashi
A twisted woman who only wants to eat things she loves, like her pet, parents, and even her own child. Master of Lancer, Vlad III.
Twice H. Pieceman (トワイス・H・ピースマン, Towaisu Eichi Pīsuman)
Voiced by: Hiroki Tochi (Japanese); Greg Chun (English)
A man who wishes for the perpetuation of war for the continued advancement of mankind. Master of Saver, Buddha.
Misao Amari (尼里 ミサオ, Amari Misao)
Voiced by: Ayaka Imamura (Japanese); Cherami Leigh (English)
Appears only in the anime. Her servant, Vánagandr, appears only int the drama CD.

=== Playable Servants ===
Saber (セイバー, Seibā) – Nero Claudius (ネロ・クラウディウス, Nero Kuraudiusu)
Voiced by: Sakura Tange (Japanese); Cassandra Lee Morris (English)

Nero is the lead heroine in Fate/Extra.
Archer (アーチャー, Āchā) – Nameless (無銘, Mumei)
Voiced by: Junichi Suwabe (Japanese); Kaiji Tang (English) (Japanese)
Caster (キャスター, Kyasutā) – Tamamo no Mae (玉藻の前, Tamamo no Mae)
Voiced by: Chiwa Saito (Japanese); Erica Lindbeck (Fate/Grand Carnival) (English) (Japanese)

=== Other Servants ===
Rider (ライダー, Raidā) – Francis Drake (フランシス・ドレイク, Furanshisu Doreiku)
Voiced by: Urara Takano (Japanese); Jessica Gee George (English)
Archer (アーチャー, Āchā) – Robin Hood (ロビンフッド, Robin Huddo)
Voiced by: Kousuke Toriumi (Japanese); Vic Mignogna (English)
Caster (キャスター, Kyasutā) – Nursery Rhyme (ナーサリーライム, Nāsarī Raimu)
Voiced by: Ai Nonaka (Japanese); Xanthe Huynh (anime), Sarah Anne Williams (Fate/Grand Carnival) (English)
Berserker (バーサーカー, Bāsākā) – Lü Bu Fèngxiān (呂布 奉先, Hōsen Ryofu)
Voiced by: Kunihiko Yasui
Saber (セイバー, Seibā) – Gawain (ガウェイン, Gawein)
Voiced by: Takahiro Mizushima (Japanese); Chris Patton (anime), J. P. Karliak (Fate/Grand Order movies) (English)
Saver (セイヴァー, Seivā) – Buddha (覚者(ブッダ), Budda)
Voiced by: Hideyuki Tanaka (Drama CD)
Berserker (バーサーカー, Bāsākā) – Li Shuwen (李書文, Ri Shobun)
Voiced by: Kunihiko Yasui (Japanese); Chris Hackney (English)
Lancer (ランサー, Ransā) – Cú Chulainn (クー・フーリン, Kū Hūrin)
Voiced by: Nobutoshi Canna (Japanese); Tony Oliver (Fate/Grand Carnival) (English)
Lancer (ランサー, Ransā) – Vlad III (ヴラド三世, Vurado Sansei)
Voiced by: Hisao Egawa
Berserker (バーサーカー, Bāsākā) – Arcueid Brunestud (アルクェイド・ブリュンスタッド, Arukueido Buryunsutaddo)
Voiced by: Ryoka Yuzuki (original), Ikumi Hasegawa (remake)

=== Others ===
Sakura Matou (間桐 桜, Matō Sakura)
Voiced by: Noriko Shitaya (Japanese); Cristina Vee (English)

A Nurse who works in the nurse's office, she plays a much larger role in the CCC sequel.
Kirei Kotomine (言峰 綺礼, Kotomine Kirei)
Voiced by: Joji Nakata (Japanese); Armen Taylor (English)

A supervisor of the Holy Grail War, who also acts as a game guide and helper to the player.
Taiga Fujimura (藤村 大河, Fujimura Taiga)
Voiced by: Miki Ito
Issei Ryudo (柳洞 一成, Ryūdō Issei)
Voiced by: Mitsuaki Madono
Shiki Ryogi (両儀 式, Ryōgi Shiki)
Voiced by: Maaya Sakamoto
Aoko Aozaki (蒼崎 青子, Aozaki Aoko)

Touko Aozaki (蒼崎 橙子, Aozaki Tōko)

== Development ==
Type-Moon producer Kazuya Niinō joined Imageepoch through CEO Ryo Mikagi to collaborate on a project. Niinō later contacted Kinoko Nasu and Takashi Takeuchi for a proposed collaboration on the development of a new game in the Fate series, which, according to the producer, was to implement various genres. At the time, Type-Moon was involved in the finalization of Fate/hollow ataraxia, and had short-term plans to develop other projects–for which Nasu was forced to refuse the role as producer.

Despite the failure, Niinō did not abandon the idea of creating a new game, and in 2007, prepared a more detailed proposal: a Japanese role-playing game, with a plot for a fundamentally new Holy Grail War not related to the events of Fate/stay night. The basis of the work and themes is set in the near future with the setting on the Moon, which was previously briefly mentioned by Nasu as an element of the Tsukihime series. In addition, a supercomputer controlling the work of the Holy Grail within the virtual reality world, in which protagonists would be placed. Due to the peculiarities of the setting, Kazuya decided to make a role-playing game with a lot of textual information, akin to the visual novel series. The producers chose 3D graphics and seamless transition plans from a third party. To differentiate the product from the rest of the Fate franchise, Kazuya invited a third-party artist working under the pseudonym Arco Wada to design the characters, despite the fact that Takeuchi did all character illustrations for previous Type-Moon games. Wada was commissioned to create an outwardly similar character to provoke the audience which kept about "30% of the original design". Niinō indicated to Wada that the Roman emperor Nero should become the historical prototype of the main heroic Servant. The original sketch, made to imitate Takeuchi's style, was rejected, and Niinō insisted on depicting the character in Wada's own style without unnecessary detail. When Type-Moon leaders received a new offer from Niinō, they planned to stop the expansion of the Fate franchise and move to work on new projects. However, they considered the possibility of developing a role-playing game based on the visual novel since the creation of Fate/stay night, as they were fans of the genre and considered the elements of the setting of the Fate universe suitable for such a project. As such, Nasu and Takeuchi's new project was approved due to its spin-off status from the original game.

After the concept was approved, Niinō divided game development between two developers: Type-Moon, whose script and character design were supervised by Nasu and Takeuchi respectively; and Imageepoch, who assigned Shuetsu Kadowaki to be the head of program and create game mechanics, assigned to the head of programming. The producer himself reserved the connection between the creators and the control over individual plotlines.

Within Imageepoch, there were various ideas on the implementation of game mechanics, such as building gameplay fighting scenes by analogy with fighting, as well as a complicated non-transitive balance system that consists of six different character actions. Unlike other representatives of the Fate franchise, both offensive and defensive skills were developed for each character, as the developers considered it necessary to "not only to reduce health points of the opponent but also to save their own" in order to keep the player's attention in the game. Niinō and Kadowaki originally decided to use mechanics similar to rock paper scissors before realizing that it would not really interest the audience. In the end, they decided to develop a system of collecting information about the enemy to significantly improve the chances of winning fights and presented as in-game events, by analogy with the servants' status screen that is gradually filling with data in Fate/stay night . More attention was given to the development of individual characters and the overall development of the story instead of focusing on game aspects. Unique joint actions in battle mode were intended to be used for various combinations of Masters and Servants, which were not implemented in the final project.

Niinō thought it was necessary to offer three playable Servants (Saber, Archer, and Caster), all of whom differ in different skills, character, and difficulty. Despite the declared independence of the story, the concept of secondary characters in the story was based on similarities with the characters of Fate/stay night, some of whom were given the same names as in the visual novel, though developers claimed that their personalities and the histories were not identical to their prototypes. To emphasize this, some of them were asked to change the kanji in names, which was ultimately not implemented. For the first time since Sasaki Kojiro was used as a servant in Fate/stay night, the ban on introducing Far Eastern characters as Servants was lifted and has made it possible for add characters like Lü Bu and Li Shuwen.

Initially, Nasu doubted the possibility of realizing Nero's personality as the basis for Saber's heroine, and the creators considered other versions of the character's prototype. Although the initial decision was left unchanged, the character's personality drastically changed to care about his environment and his love interest. The second available character to choose was Archer, whose personality and appearance were kept by Niinō and Wada. They believed that this hero "should always look cool" and visually increased his masculinity. The third character, Caster, caused the greatest difficulties as Niinō suggested designing her as an adult woman with animal ears. The original design of the heroine was conceived by Takeuchi as a mixture of Japanese costume and Chinese traditional clothing Hanfu; the facial features and hairstyle were created under the impression of Yoko's character in Gurren Lagann. In an interview, Wada said the reason she drew anthropomorphic characters, especially Caster, was because she liked animal ears and found them to be very cute.

According to Takeuchi, Niinō personally developed the central storyline of the game while Nasu translated his ideas into text. Compared to previous franchise products, a new servant class was added – Saver, whose true identity is based on Shakyamuni Buddha as the final boss and Grail Defender. After the game's release, Niinō noted that he was not able to concentrate enough on dramatic aspects of the plot; in response, Nasu focused on daily school life. The scriptor's campaign setting turned out to be a capitalist and stagnant utopia, and the Holy Grail war was used to select masters that would use the artifact's properties for the common good, not personal fulfillment.

Seiyuu casting was done by Nasu, Takeuchi, and Niinō. The same cast involved in Type-Moon's previous work was approved. Saber's role was given to Sakura Tange, who had voiced the protagonist in Cardcaptor Sakura.

In 2020, a remake, Fate/Extra Record, was announced to be in development by Type-Moon Studio BB. Initially set to release in 2025 for PlayStation 4, PlayStation 5, Nintendo Switch, and PC, it was later pushed back to spring 2026. On March 16, 2026, a mutual agreement was signed between Bandai Namco and Notes for the former to withdraw from publishing the game after it was reported to be indefinitely delayed.

== Release ==
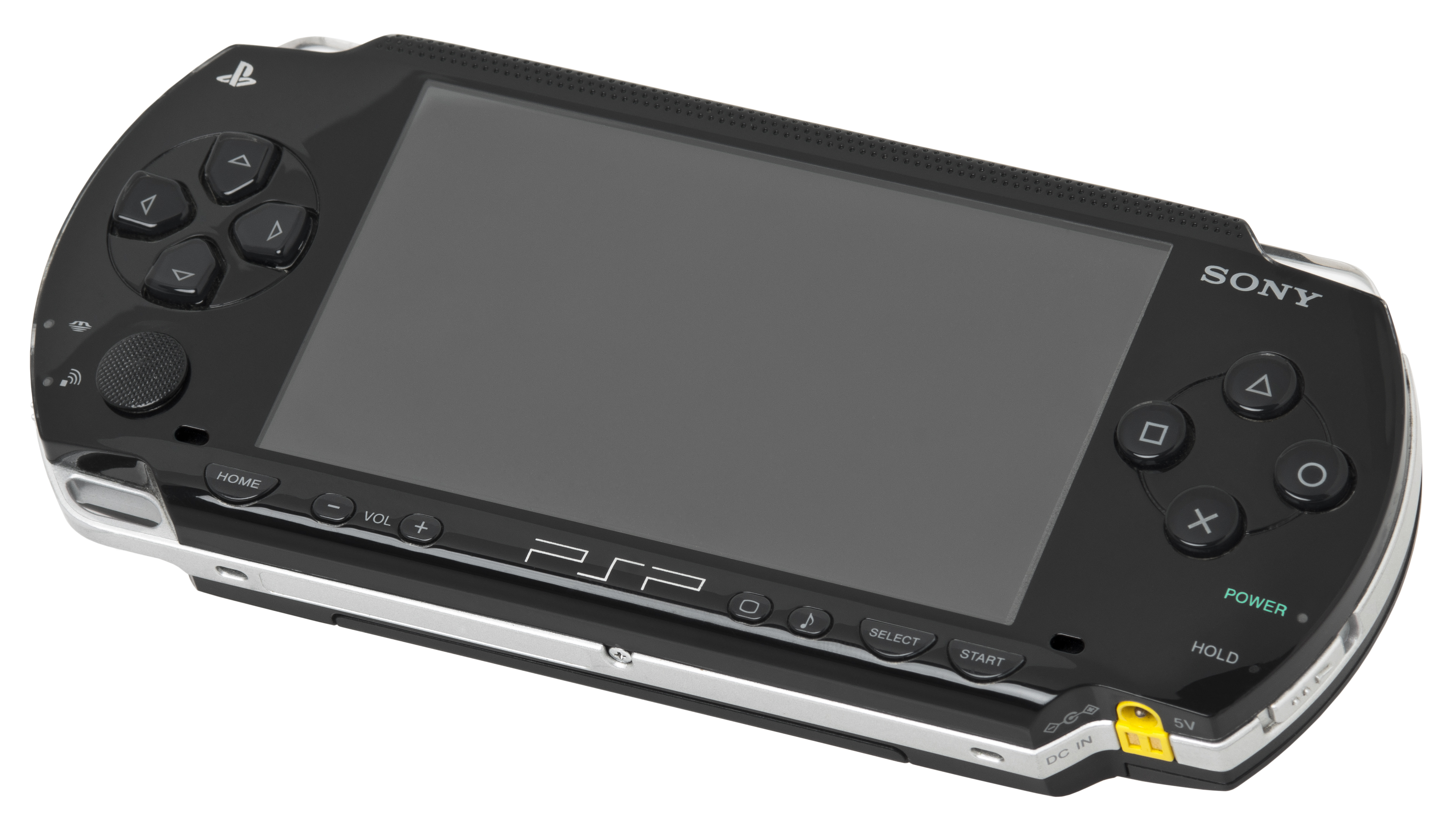
Fate/Extra was originally released for the PlayStation Portable (pictured) in Japan on July 22, 2010.

The game was first announced in the September 2009 issue of Famitsu, and was released for the PlayStation Portable in both the regular and "Type-Moon Box" editions; the latter included a Saber Figma figure from the game, a visual book and a limited edition soundtrack. While the original release was planned for March 2010, the release date was pushed back to July 22, 2010, for further development. The official theme song of the game is "Ranse Eroica" (亂世エロイカ, Chaotic Heroic), performed by Ali Project and the game's music was composed by Shinji Hosoe.

In July 2011, Aksys Games confirmed it would be publishing the game in North America. The North American Limited Edition included the special 15-page Fate Visual Works Art book and the 11 song Limited Soundtrack from the "Type-Moon Box" edition. In January 2012, Ghostlight announced its plans to release the game in PAL territories. The four-volume drama CD series Sound Drama Fate/EXTRA was also released starting from winter 2012.

A companion game Fate/Extra CCC was released on March 28, 2013, in Japan. The official theme song of the second game, "Sakura Meikyū" (サクラメイキュウ, Blossom Maze), is performed by Kanon Wakeshima.

== Reception ==
Reception

Aggregate scores
| Aggregator | Score |
|---|---|
| GameRankings | 63% |
| Metacritic | 58/100 |

Review scores
| Publication | Score |
|---|---|
| Destructoid | 7/10 |
| GamePro | 6/10 |
| GameSpot | 6/10 |
| GameZone | 7/10 |
| Pocket Gamer | 3/5 |
| RPGamer | 2.5/5 |
| Dark Zero | 6/10 |
| Game Critics | 8.5/10 |
| Gaming Union | 6/10 |
| The Digital Fix | 7/10 |

According to review aggregator Metacritic, Fate/Extra received "mixed or average" reviews from critics. Some critics viewed it as a work that used Japanese role-playing game and visual novel elements.

Much of the focus within reviews had centered on the plot, which was considered to be what kept players engaged. They also praised the quality of the text, which, according to Dark Zero's Dominic Shird, was reminiscent of the game Lost Odyssey. While Heidi Kemps of GamePro remarked that as in the case of other Nasu's works, the exposition was prolonged and the manner of transmitting the characters' thoughts corresponded more to "traditional" visual novels. Other critics also made analogies to the genre and highlighted the decision trees, relationships points between characters, and nonstandard endings. Digital Fix reviewer Lewis Brown felt that these visual novel elements were well-implemented, but noted that the story would benefit if it had more dramatic components without an everyday school life.

The availability of three different Servants was positively received, and according to some reviewers, it encouraged the player to replay the game. However, the need for a New Game Plus mode, according to GameSpot's Shiva Stella, was controversial because of the main story's immutability. Lewis Brown emphasized the use of furigana in the game, including the localized English version, which added semantic nuances to the dialogue. The critics gave high marks from the in-game system for collecting information about enemy servants, which directly influenced the course of the battles by its results, defining battle tactics, which, according to Zack Welhouse from RPGamer, reminded with its atmosphere the novels The Hunger Games and Battle of the King. Welhouse also noted the lack of understanding of the events taking place on the part of the main characters, whose motivations were reduced to taking obligations. In the reviewers' opinions, the prologue of the game was unnecessarily stretched due to the time needed to unlock gameplay elements.

The audio-visual component of the game was well received. GameZone critic Stephanie Carmichael pointed out that the sprites' characters appearing in the dialog box performed well and contributed to the post-battle atmosphere. Reviewers noted the overall character design was reminiscent of anime, seamless transitions from a third-person camera when watching characters and the design of the "Arena" mode by the standards of Japanese role-playing games in the PlayStation Portable version. However, Dominic Shird suggested that developers should have created more diverse graphic schemes for dungeons instead of constantly using shades of blue; Zack Welhouse also highlighted the same type of monster design.

Fate/Extra, as a role-playing game, was subjected to various criticisms by reviewers who compared it to Persona 3, and Welhouse noted the game (especially the" Arena" mode) took the worst aspects of its predecessor. Reviewers noted the simplicity of Fate/Extra implemented in non-transitive game balance, which, in their opinion, was a direct comparison to rock paper scissors. Critics' opinions are divided in the assessment of battle mechanics to the player's skills: some observers believed it showed a high value of the game experience gained and gathering information about the enemy (which increased the threshold for entering the game), however, others considered this factor meaningless due to the presence of high-level opponents and the inherent randomness in the system. Stephanie Carmichael said the main problem of the gameplay was the intuitively difficult system of countering opponents in battle, which could lead to increased demands on each of the player's actions. The battle phases were considered "quite interesting, but quickly boring" due to the low pace and frequent repetition of opponents. Other shortcomings pointed out were the weakness of some opponents, the inability to skip previously read text and save during the study dungeons, and small rewards for clearing them. The dungeon was criticized for being "boring" and using the same design in all its maps. The size of the world in Fate/Extra was regarded to be small for market console role-playing games.

Various reviewers believed Fate/Extra unsuccessfully tried to "sit on two chairs" when balancing both role-playing game visual novel elements together, and would only have been well-received if either genre was focused on. Kemps said this could have been achieved by recategorizing the game's genre to adventure.

== Media ==
=== Manga ===
Three manga adaptations based on the game were released. The first adaptation was written and illustrated by Robi〜na and serialized in Kadokawa Shoten's Comptiq magazine from May 2011 to December 2014, compiling up to 6 tankōbon volumes. The second manga, which adapts the CCC storyline, was also written and illustrated by Robi〜na and was also serialized in Kadokawa's Comptiq magazine from July 2015 to March 2024, compiling up to 8 tankōbon volumes. A spinoff manga titled Fate/Extra CCC FoxTail (フェイト/エクストラ CCC FoxTail, Feito/Ekusutora CCC FoxTail) was written by Takenokoseijin and serialized in Kadokawa Shoten's Monthly Comp Ace magazine in December 2013.

=== Anime ===
An anime adaptation and sequel titled Fate/Extra Last Encore (フェイト/エクストラ ラストアンコール, Feito/Ekusutora Rasuto Ankōru) was first announced on March 22, 2016, at the AnimeJapan Fate Project panel to be released in 2017. Shaft was revealed to be handling the animation with Kinoko Nasu returning as the writer. Akiyuki Shinbo and Yukihiro Miyamoto directed the series at Shaft, featuring character designs by Masaaki Takiyama and music composed by Satoru Kōsaki. On July 30, Atsushi Abe and Sakura Tange were confirmed to voice Hakuno Kishinami and Saber respectively. The series premiered January 28, 2018, on Tokyo MX. The opening theme is "Bright Burning Shout" by Takanori Nishikawa and the ending theme is "Tsuki to Hanataba" (月と花束, Moon and Bouquet) by Sayuri. Netflix licensed the series for worldwide online streaming before giving the rights to Aniplex of America.
