= Liu Yunqiao =

Chinese martial artist (1909–1992)

Liu Yunqiao 劉雲樵
- Born: 1909; Qing dynasty, Jibeitou Village, Cangzhou, Hebei Province
- Died: January 24th, 1992 (age 82-83); Taiwan, Taipei City
- Other names: "Xiǎo bàwáng" (小霸王, Eng. "little overlord")
- Nationality: Taiwanese
- Style: Bajiquan, piguazhang, liuhe tanglangquan, (Note: Six Harmony Praying Mantis Boxing) baguazhang, taizu changquan, mizongquan
- Teachers: Li Shuwen, Ding Zicheng, Gong Baotian, Zhang Yaoting

Other information
- Occupation: Martial artist, Martial arts promoter, Soldier

Liu Yunqiao (劉雲樵, 1909 - January 24, 1992) was a Chinese Army Colonel and a martial artist from the Republic of China. He was born in Jibeitou Village, Cangzhou, Hebei Province and is most famous for his martial arts prowess. He was a closed-door disciple of martial artist Li Shuwen and was proficient in various martial arts, mainly Bajiquan.

He established the Wutan Martial Arts Promotion Center (武壇國術推廣中心, also referred to simply as "Wutan"), the "Bajiquan Association" (八極拳協會), "Jianyi Association" (劍藝協會) (Note: Sword art), and a few other martial arts institutions. The associated groups have spread all over the world and contributed a lot to the promotion of Chinese martial arts.

== Biography ==
=== Early life ===
Born into a family of scholars, there were more than 20 scholars in the Liu family during the Qing Dynasty, and they were famous in the local area. His grandfather, Liu Zijing, once served as the prefect of Hanzhong, Shaanxi. His father Liu Zhiyi and uncle Liu Zhijie were both generals of the Beiyang Army. Because of this, everyone in his hometown called their home "General Liu's Mansion".

Liu Yunqiao was born in Jibeitou Village, Cangzhou County, Hebei Province. He was in poor health since he was a child. In 1914, when he was five years old, his servant Zhang Yaoting taught him mizongquan in order to strengthen his body.

The famed bajiquan master Li Shuwen served as a teacher in Yunqiao's father's army. In 1916, when Liu Yunqiao was 8 years old, his father invited Li Shuwen to teach at his house and Yunqiao became Li Shuwen's closed-door disciple.

At the age of 19, his father wanted him to study in the Law Department of Chaoyang University. Instead, Liu Yunqiao chose to follow master Li Shuwen in his travels. In 1931, by the invitation of Li Jinglin, Li Shuwen went to Shandong Guoshu Museum as the chief instructor, accompanied by Liu Yunqiao. At that time, Zhang Xiangwu, another disciple of Li Shuwen, was in charge of maintaining law and order, eliminating bandits and tobacco and drug distributors in Huangxian County, Shandong Province. Li Shuwen took Liu Yunqiao to visit him. At this time, Liu Yunqiao began to show his prowess, defeating several warriors who came to challenge him and earned the title/nickname of "Xiǎo bàwáng" (小霸王, Eng. "little overlord").

When Li Shuwen lived in Huangxian County, martial artist Zhang Xiangwu asked him to help him correct his Kunwu swordsmanship. Liu Yunqiao followed Zhang Xiangwu and learned Yang-style tai chi, Wudang Sword, Qingping sword and Kunwu sword. At the end of 1931, when Li Jinglin died, Li Shuwen asked Liu Yunqiao to follow Zhang Xiangwu and continue wandering by himself. Liu Yunqiao spent more than two years with Zhang Xiangwu, during which time he learned Liuhe Tanglang from the famous local martial artist Ding Zicheng. In 1933, when Gong Baotian visited Zhang Xiangwu as a guest, and from Gong, Liu also learned baguazhang.

In 1933, Li Shuwen went to Jinan to participate in the province's national martial arts examination presided over by the chairman of Shandong Province Han Fuju and served as a referee. According to Liu Yunqiao, on the way back to Tianjin, Li Shuwen was poisoned and died in Weixian, Shandong. Zhang Xiangwu informed Liu Yunqiao that he could not arrest the murderer in Weixian. After escorting Li Shuwen's coffin to his hometown, Liu Yunqiao returned to Tianjin. According to Li Zikun and Li Zifang, Li Shuwen returned to Tianjin Xiaozhan's adopted son Li Dongtang's home in 1933. He once instructed his grandchildren Li Zikun and Li Zifang to practice martial arts. He died in Li Dongtang's home due to a cerebral hemorrhage in 1934.

In 1936, Liu defeated the Kwantung Army Kendo teacher Fan Ota Tokusaburo in Tianjin and appeared in the newspapers. As a result, he got the attention of the Kuomintang Central Bureau and recruited him as an intelligence officer responsible for assassination.

While in Tianjin, Liu Yunqiao wanted to learn bafanquan (八番拳) (Note: Not Bafaquan (八法拳).) from a Wang Yunzhang, but Wang disagreed. Liu Yunqiao entered Wang's kwoon, Liu was suddenly scalded Wang Yunzhang with boiling water, and beat him. When his disciples came to protect him, Wang declared that Liu was a KMT Central Union spy and an "hanjian" (collaborator/race traitor). Regardless, Wang ended up agreeing to teach Liu bafanquan and after that, Wang closed his kwoon and went to Shanghai to make a living.

=== Military service period ===
In 1936, the Kuomintang Central Bureau of Statistics sent Liu Yunqiao to Shaanxi. In 1937, Liu applied for the fifteenth period of the Seventh Branch of the Huangpu Military Academy in Fengxiang, Shaanxi. After graduating in 1939, while waiting for distribution, he was arrested and imprisoned for accidentally wounding the principal of the military school because of an accident that occurred during a hunting trip. After being interrogated by General Hu Zongnan, the governor of the Northwest, Liu was pardoned. He was awarded the rank of second lieutenant and went to the Taihang Mountains to fight against the Japanese army. He was injured many times.

In 1940, Liu Yunqiao was injured and taken prisoner, and was locked up in a prisoner of war camp in Yuncheng, Shanxi. Liu Yunqiao managed to escape, swam across the Yellow River and fled back to the back, where he was recuperating in Xi'an. After that, he joined the intelligence unit and went deep behind enemy lines for assassinations. In 1941, he served as the captain of the Northwest Detective Team. In 1943, he was transferred to the Chief of Staff of the Sichuan-Shaanxi Line District Command.

In 1949, he retreated to Taiwan with the Nationalist Government, and was at the rank of high school. He served as the captain of the training brigade in Hukou, Hsinchu County, and later as the head of the personnel section of the staff of the Paratrooper Command. In 1955, he served as the director of the Northern District Center of the Joint Logistics Service. After the expiration of his service, Liu Yunqiao retired from the military and spent two or three years at Jingmei's home in Taipei.

=== Veteran life ===
In 1967, the guard room of the Presidential Palace was reorganized, and his classmate Chiang Kai-shek was in charge. In 1968, Liu Yunqiao visited Malaysia. After returning to China, he was recommended by Kong Lingsheng and summoned by Chiang Kai-shek. He served as a security consultant and taught Bajiquan in the guard room of the Presidential Palace.

In 1970, he visited Manila, Philippines, and opened classes in tai chi, baguazhang, and Kunwu Sword in Manila. In 1971, he founded "Wu Tan" magazine and the "Wu Tan Guoshu Promotion Center". The magazine ceased publication in 1973.

In 1978, Liu served as a coach in the "Lianzhibu Boxing Teacher Training Class" (聯指部拳術師資訓練班) organized by Chiang Ching-kuo and trained four trainees, including the "Seven Seas Guards" that formed the Presidential guard for Chiang Ching-kuo.

In 1982, he opened a martial arts coaching class and taught in person. In the same year, he visited the American branch. In 1983, he visited the Japanese branch. In 1987, the "Bajiquan Committee" was established. In 1991, the "Swordsmanship Committee" was established.

Liu Yunqiao died at the Cathay General Hospital in Taipei City on January 24, 1992, at the age of 84.

== Family ==
Liu Yunqiao had a partner in his hometown, and they had a son and two daughters after marriage. During the Anti-Japanese War in 1941, he married Zhu Jianxia in Baoji County. Ms. Liu Zhu Jianxia finally settled in Taiwan with Liu Yunqiao.

== Bibliography ==
- Bajiquan (八極拳), 1985
- Kunwujianpu (昆吾劍譜), 1990

In 1989, Liu was invited by the Chinese National Art Association to compile textbooks on Chinese martial arts.

== Disciples ==
Liu Yunqiao's disciples are divided into two major systems. One is Wutan disciples. They are ranked according to their generations.

- Wu Zibei (武字輩):
  - Liang Jici, Adam Hsu, Su Yu-chang, Dai Shizhe, Zhou gaoshan, Cheng Zhishun, Huang Yinan, Wu Songfa, Xi Jiajun, Huang Ximing, Chen Guoqin, Huang Weizhe, Lin Deyu, Tsai Hong-tu, Chen Zhanglin, Ji Zhaohua
- Tan Zibei (壇字輩):
  - Guo Xiaobo, Sun Qingyu, Ceng Qizhuang, Zou Jiaxiang, Weng Zhongliang, Ye Qili, Lu Zhanggui, Wang Jinzhong, Ceng Qixiang, Liu Mingzong, Lin Zhongxi, Xu Qiude, Zhang Guanghong, Lin Songxian, Guan Feng-zhong, Zheng Shaokang, Xu Yonghong, Wang Xingguo.
- Guang Zibei (光字輩):
  - Shi Guoyingzhe, Chen Baicheng, Ceng Fengshu, Zhao Zhi, Chen Qiwen.

In addition, it is the military and police system, such as Jiang Zhitai, deputy leader of the first group of Seven Seas Guards

Department of Military Information System: Jin Liyan, Guo Gantai, Liu Daxin.

== In popular culture ==
In manga series Kenji, the protagonist's Bajiquan teacher Liu Yuexia (劉月俠) is based on Liu Yunqiao.
