= Bajiquan =

Chinese martial art

Bajiquan 八極拳
- Also known as: Eight Extremities boxing, Bodyguard style
- Focus: Striking, Grappling
- Country of origin: Greater China
- Creator: Unknown
- Famous practitioners: Li Shuwen, Liu Yunqiao, Adam Hsu, Su Yu-chang, Ryuchi Matsuda, Li Jianwu, Wu Lianzhi, Wu Yue
- Olympic sport: No

Bajiquan (Chinese: 八極拳; pinyin: Bājíquán) is a traditional Chinese martial art that features explosive, short-range power in close combat and is well-known for its rapid elbow and shoulder strikes. Its full name is kaimen bajiquan (Chinese: 開門八極拳; pinyin: Kāimén bājíquán; lit. 'open-gate eight-extremities boxing').

The eight extremities in Bajiquan are the eight distalmost parts of the body used to strike the opponent. This includes the fist, forearm, elbow, shoulder, hip, thigh, knee, and foot to deliver a powerful blow in close range. Bajiquan is also known as the "bodyguard style", as this was the pugilism style taught and used by personal bodyguards for Mao Zedong, Chiang Kai-shek, and Puyi (the last Qing dynasty emperor).

Bajiquan is now popular in northern China and Taiwan. Later, it was introduced to Japan, South Korea, and other countries such as the United States, Canada, Britain, France and Italy, among others.

== Etymology ==
Bajiquan

Chinese name
- Traditional Chinese: 八極拳
- Simplified Chinese: 八极拳
- Hanyu Pinyin: Bājíquán
- Literal meaning: "Eight Extremities Fist"
Transcriptions
Standard Mandarin
- Hanyu Pinyin: Bājíquán
- Wade–Giles: Pa Chi Ch'uan

Japanese name
- Kanji: 八極拳
- Kana: はっきょくけん
Transcriptions
- Romanization: Hakkyoku ken

According to most common etymology, bajiquan was originally called baziquan (耙子拳; 'rake fists/boxing') because the fists, held loosely and slightly open, are used to strike downwards in a rake-like fashion. The name was considered to be rather crude, so it was changed to bajiquan. The term baji comes from the I Ching and signifies an "extension of all directions". In this case, it means "including everything" or "the universe".

Most people believe that Bajiquan was originally known as Bazi Quan, in which bazi' means "rake." The style acquired this name because of the shape of most of the fists used. The term bazi was later changed to baji, which means "to reach far away in all directions." This was considered a more apt and noteworthy description of the style, because it suggests the ability to achieve great things.

— Lu Shengli

However, this etymology is not universally accepted.

== History ==
Little is known about the origin of the style. Information before the Republican era of China is extremely rare, with clearest documentation beginning circa 1920s-1930s.

The first practitioner clearly identified in written history was a man named Wu Zhong (吴钟; Wú Zhōng; 1712–1802), a member of the Hui minority and from the Wu family clan of the Mengcun region of Cangzhou, Hebei.

According to the genealogical records of the Wu family, Wu Zhong's great-grandfather left the family stronghold to settle about 50 km away in the isolated hamlet of Houzhuangke (后庄科) in the neighboring province of Shandong. Wu Zhong is said to have been born in Houzhuangke before returning to settle with the main branch of his family in the village of Mengcun, Hebei province. Little is known of Wu Zhong, except that he quickly reached an unparalleled level in the practice of martial arts. His prowess earned him the nickname "god of the spear", as well as being recruited to serve as an instructor at the imperial court under Prince Xun. When he was about 60 years old, Wu Zhong returned to Mengcun where he devoted the last thirty years of his life to transmitting his fighting art, and the village became the source of the development of bajiquan.

The origin of the mastery acquired by Wu Zhong remains unknown to this day, it is currently the subject of many controversies between the different branches of bajiquan. Historical documents contain two versions of the origins of bajiquan:

- The Cang County annals, the baji manual of the Wu family, and the Pobei manuscript indicate that an itinerant Taoist monk by the name of Lai (癞; lài; 'the leper') and his disciple Pi (癖; pǐ; 'the enthusiast') would have stayed in Mengcun to teach bajiquan as well as the handling of the great spear to Wu Zhong. By the admission of the Wu family of Mengcun, this reference is probably to be considered as a legend.;
- The other is Zhang Yueshan, a monk from Yueshan Temple in Henan Province (either Zhengzhou or Jiaozuo), who was returning to secular life and traveling around. It is said that he taught the great spear method.
- Besides those two theories, there is also speculation that the martial art originates from Shaolin Temple in Henan, unrelated to Zhang Yueshan.

In any case, all sources agree on the fact that Wu Zhong traveled a lot, and that it was only at the end of his life that he devoted himself to teaching bajiquan. It is presumed that the legend of Lai and Pi simply symbolizes the martial knowledge that Wu Zhong was able to acquire throughout his life, probably from the study of the other styles of the region, and that he crystallized it in the form of bajiquan.

The first historical reference to bajiquan appears in military treaty called Jixiao Xinshu written by general Qi Jiguang (1528–1588). It is inferred that bajiquan may have been a well-established martial art during the 16th Century.

Wu Zhong had only one child, his daughter Wu Rong (吴荣; Wú Róng), who at the age of 30 married an expert in Changquan and stopped practicing bajiquan after a few years. To avoid remaining childless and ensure the continuity of his art, Wu Zhong adopted Wu Ying (吴溁; Wú Yíng), a distant nephew of the Wu family of Mengcun. Wu Zhong transmitted all his knowledge to Wu Ying, as well as to Wu Zhongyu (Chinese: 吴钟毓), another distant nephew of the Wu family of Mengcun. In 1790, at the request of his master, Wu Ying officially introduced the name "bajiquan" and he wrote the first martial manual of the Wu family to ensure the transmission of the family art among generations to come. Thus, bajiquan was transmitted within the Wu family who also ensured the dissemination of the style to other families in Mengcun and the surrounding villages.

At first, bajiquan was transmitted mainly to the Hui people of Meng Village, but it was also transmitted to Luohan, an area where many Han people live. Eventually, it came to be divided into the Hui lineage of Mencun and the Han lineage of Luo.

=== Contemporary history of bajiquan ===
Li Shuwen (1860–1934) was considered one of the most important movers of the martial art during Qing dynasty. He was from Cangzhou (滄州), Hebei, and acquired the nickname "God of Spear Li". A Beijing opera Wu Shen (martial male character) by training, he was also an expert fighter. His most famous quote is, "I do not know what it's like to hit a man twice." Li Shuwen's students included Huo Dian Ge (霍殿閣) (bodyguard to Puyi, the last Emperor of China), Li Chenwu (bodyguard to Mao Zedong), and Liu Yunqiao (劉雲樵) (secret agent for the nationalist Kuomintang and instructor of the Chiang Kai-shek's bodyguards). Bajiquan has since acquired a reputation as the "bodyguard style". Ma Fengtu (馬鳳圖) and Ma Yintu (馬英圖) introduced bajiquan into the Central Guoshu Institute (Nanjing Guoshu Guan 南京國術館) where it is required for all students.

The impetus that set the spread of bajiquan throughout China was that of the Central Guoshu Institute, as a regular course common to the two training courses "Shaolin Gate" and "Wudang Gate". It all started with the establishment of "bajiquan teaching materials for group training" (団体訓練用八極拳教材). As the branch of Central Guoshu Institute expanded, bajiquan became more popular and popularized.

=== Relation to piguaquan ===
In the tradition of Ma brothers, bajiquan is believed to share roots with another Hebei martial art, piguaquan. It is said that Wu Zhong, the oldest traceable master in the bajiquan lineage, taught both arts together as an integrated fighting system. The legend has it that they eventually split apart, only to be recombined by Li Shuwen in the late 18th to early 19th century. As a testament to the complementary nature of these two styles, a proverb states: "When pigua is added to baji, gods and demons will all be terrified. When baji is added to pigua, heroes will sigh knowing they are no match against it." (八極參劈掛，神鬼都害怕。劈掛參八極，英雄嘆莫及)

No historical proofs supporting this version, however, were found.

== Branches and lineages ==
Prominent branches and lineages of the art survived to modern times, including Han-style, Huo-style, Ji-style, Li-style, Ma-style, Qiang-style, Wu-style (from Wu Xiefeng), Wutan-style, and yin yang-style bajiquan. Each has a unique element while sharing core practices. Some lineages are more common or only exist in China, while others have spread to Western countries.

=== Mengcun bajiquan ===
Meng Village (Mengcun) is said to be the original birthplace of bajiquan, or at least the modern versions of the art. Baji is still widely practiced there.

=== Nanjing bajiquan ===
Bajiquan of Nanjing was introduced to the Guoshu Institute by students of Zhang Jingxing, Han Huiqing, and Ma Yingtu. Han had a great influence on the spread of baji in southern China, to the point that there was a saying bei li nan han meaning "Li [Shuwen] in the north and Han [Huachen] in the south".

=== Wu Xiufeng ===
Wu Xiufeng (1908–1976) is the "grandfather" of many modern baji lineages. The following lineages descend from him.

==== Tian-style ====
Tian-style is a branch which has mutual influences from Jingang Bashi—the second art practiced by Tian Jinzhong. Practitioners include Wu Xiufeng, Tian Jinzhong, and Shen Jiarui >> Zhou Jingxuan Tian-style is practiced in China and abroad.

==== Yin Yang–style ====
Yin Yang-style was created by Zhao Fujiang, who combined his knowledge of baji, xingyiquan and yiquan to create a new art form. Yin-Yang is primarily practiced in China.

=== Wutan-style baji ===
Wutan-style baji is the most common lineage in the West today. Originally from Taiwan, where its founder, Liu Yunqiao, lived. This lineage includes additional arts that are taught alongside baji, such as piguaquan and baguazhang.

Jian Diansheng >> Li Shuwen >> Liu Yunqiao >> Adam Hsu, Su Yuchang, and Tony Yang >> Many students in Taiwan and abroad (taught by one or more of them).

== Features ==
=== Tactics and strategy ===
Bajiquan opens the opponent's arms forcibly (qiang kai men; 強開門) and mount attacks at high, mid, and low levels of the body (san pan lian ji; 三盤連擊). It is most useful in close combat, as it focuses on elbow, knee, shoulder and hip strikes. When blocking an attack or nearing an opponent, bajiquan techniques emphasize striking major points of vulnerability, namely the thorax (trunk of the body), legs and neck.

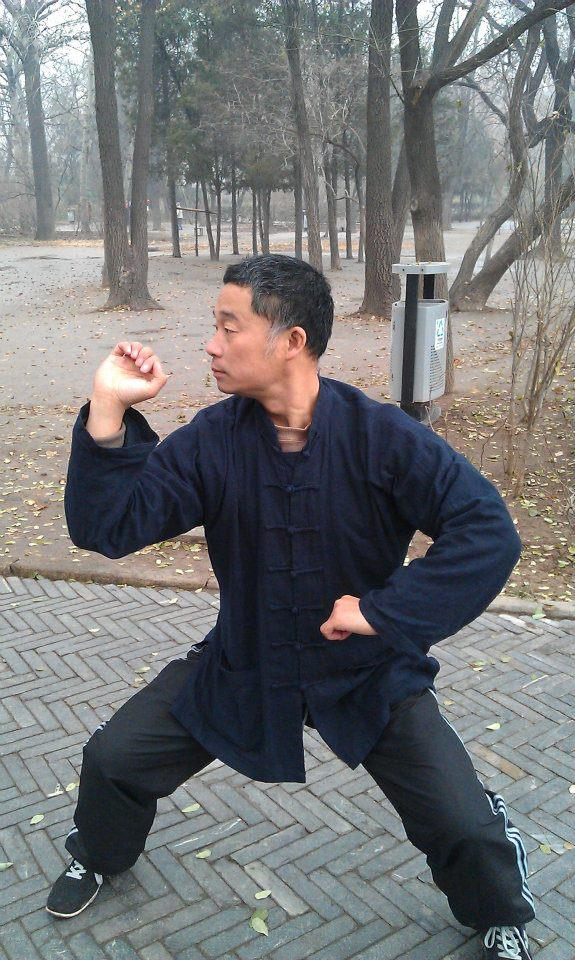
Zhou Jingxuan of Tianjin, holding a typical bajiquan posture. The sideways-protruding elbow is often used for striking in this art.

The "six big ways of opening" (liu da kai; 六大開) are:

- Ding (頂): using the fist, elbow or shoulder to push forward and upward.
- Bao (抱): putting arms together as if hugging someone. It is usually followed by pi 劈 (splitting).
- Ti (提): elevating the knee to hit the thigh of the opponent, or elevating the foot to hit the shin of the opponent, etc.
- Dan (單): using a single move.
- Kua (胯): using the hip.
- Chan (纏): entanglement with rotation around the wrist, elbow and shoulder.

=== Stepping and body methods ===
Footwork in bajiquan has three special features:

- Zhenjiao
- Nianbu
- Chuangbu

These striking techniques are related to traditional Chinese medicine, which states that all parts of the body are connected, either physically or spiritually.

=== Forms ===
The forms of baji are divided into armed and unarmed routines. There are twenty fist forms, which include twelve baji Small Structure Fists, baji Black Tiger Fist, baji danzhai, baji danda/duida, baji luohan gong, and baji si lang kuan. There are eight weapons forms, including liuheda qiang (spear), chun yang jian (sword), san yin dao (sabre), xing zhe bang (staff), pudao, and chun qiu dadao (a long two-handed heavy blade, used by Generals sitting on their horses).

Most schools focus on a much smaller curriculum. Standard across almost all groups are xiaobaji and dabaji; two weapons forms, the sabre and the spear; a two-man training routine called baji duijie or baji duida and a series of 8 short attacking methods called the "bashi" (Eight Postures), which are derived from the art of Shaolin jingang bashi.

=== Power generation and expression ===
The major features of baji include elbow strikes, arm/fist punches, hip checks and strikes with the shoulder. All techniques are executed with a short power, developed through training; among Chinese martial artists, baji is known for its fast movements. Baji focuses on infighting, entering from a longer range with a distinctive charging step (zhenjiao).

The essence of bajiquan lies in jin, or power-issuing methods, particularly fa jin (explosive power). The style contains six types of jin, eight different ways to hit and several principles of power usage. Most of bajiquan's moves utilize a one-hit push-strike method from very close range. The bulk of the damage is dealt through the momentary acceleration that travels up from the waist to the limb and further magnified by the charging step known as zhenjiao.

The mechanics of jin are developed through many years of practice and bajiquan is known for its strenuous lower-body training and its emphasis on the horse stance. Its horse stance is higher than that of typical changquan styles. Like other styles, there is also "the arrow-bow stance", "the one-leg stance", "the empty stance" (虛步; xūbù), "the drop stance" (仆步; pūbù), etc. There are eight different hand poses, in addition to different types of breathing and zhenjiao.

== Influences ==
Baji focuses on being more direct, culminating in powerful, fast strikes that will render an opponent unable to continue. Even so, there are some styles that are derived from baji's main principles or concepts on how to hit the opponent:

- Eight postures (Bashi)
- Eight movements method (Bashi gong)
- Eight movements method (Bashi chui)
- Double Eight Postures (Shuang bashi)
- Eight postures of the dragon style (Longxing bashi)

Many of these forms are also based or mixed with luohanquan, a Shaolin style. The term bashi may also refer to baji. The term is also used in xingyiquan.

== Notable people ==
- Li Shuwen
- Liu Yunqiao
- Adam Hsu - Taiwanese bajiquan master
- Su Yu-chang
- Li Jianwu
- Wu Lianzhi
- Wu Yue (actor)
- Ryuchi Matsuda - Japanese author behind A Historical Outline of Chinese Martial Arts and a manga called Kenji. Matsuda is known for introducing and publicising various Chinese martial arts in Japan, such as bajiquan.

== In popular culture ==
Bajiquan is a staple in martial arts media, appearing in various movies and video games.

- It is featured in the Chinese movie The Grandmaster (2013), performed by character Yixiantian (played by Chang Chen), and Hong Kong drama A Fist Within Four Walls (2016), performed by character Chou Au-kuen (played by Ruco Chan), character Fa Man (played by Grace Wong) and character Duen Ying-fung (played by Benjamin Yuen).
- The Taiwanese idol drama Baji Teenagers (一代新兵之八極少年, Yīdài xīnbīng zhī bā jí shàonián), which showcases actor Chiu Pin Cheng (alias Leo Chiu).
- It is featured in The Matrix film franchise. Smith, played by Hugo Weaving, exhibits basic bajiquan techniques in the film.
- Li Mei from Mortal Kombat: Deadly Alliance uses bajiquan as one of her fighting styles.
- It inspired lightning bending used by some firebenders including Zuko, Azula, Iroh, and Mako on the Nickelodeon animated show Avatar: The Last Airbender and its sequel series The Legend of Korra.
- It is featured in the Marvel Cinematic Universe. Bajiquan is first used in Shang Chi and the Legend of the Ten Rings as one of the fighting styles of Shang Chi. It is later used in Black Panther: Wakanda Forever by Namor.

=== Japan ===
Bajiquan has hugely impacted the Japanese pop culture. In Japanese, it is known as hakkyokuken, a Japanese reading of the Chinese characters used to write bajiquan. Bajiquan's impact would begin with Kenji, a manga series written by Ryuchi Matsuda and illustrated by Yoshihide Fujiwara. It follows a teenage practitioner of Bajiquan and is supposedly based on Ryuichi Matsuda's own journey in Chinese martial arts.

In 1993, Yu Suzuki—who got interested in martial arts because of the manga Kenji—would direct Virtua Fighter, a groundbreaking 3D fighting game. The game was hugely successful in Japan and amongst the roster was a bajiquan practitioner Akira Yuki, solidifying bajiquan's status in Japanese pop-culture. Bajiquan is also central to Yu Suzuki's Shenmue, a "sister" game to Virtua Fighter series.

Bajiquan is featured in many manga/anime series, including Air Master, Gantz, Kenichi: The Mightiest Disciple, Fist of the Blue Sky, Undead Unluck, Love Hina, Negima! Magister Negi Magi, Beelzebub and Garōden

In Japanese video games, it is featured in:

- Bloody Roar series by Hudson, used by Shenlong
- Dead or Alive series by Tecmo, used by Kokoro
- Fatal Fury by SNK, used by Tung Fu Rue
- Fighter's History by Data East, used by Lee Diendou
- Guilty Gear by Arc System Works, used by Jam Kuradoberi
- Judgment and Lost Judgment by Sega, used by Takayuki Yagami in some of the moves of his Tiger-fighting style.
- The King of Fighters also by SNK, used by Sie Kensou
- Melty Blood and the Fate franchise by Type-Moon, used by Miyako Arima in the former, and Kirei Kotomine, Rin Tohsaka, and Li Shuwen in the latter
- Rival Schools also by Capcom, used by Akira Kazama who also guest stars in Street Fighter V as a DLC character
- Street Fighter by Capcom, twins Yun and Yang as well as by Karin Kanzuki
- Tekken by Namco, mainly used by Leo Kliesen and secondarily by Michelle Chang and Julia Chang
- Tobal 2 by Square, used by Chaco Utani
- Virtua Fighter series by Sega, used by Akira Yuki

== See also ==
- Piguaquan
- Sanda (sport)
- Xingyiquan

== Bibliography ==
- Crudelli, Chris (2008). The Way of the Warrior. Dorling Kindersley Ltd. ISBN 978-14-0533-750-2.
- Liu Yunqi (1992). 八極拳 [Bajiquan] (in Japanese). Translated by Masaru Oyanagi (to Japanese). Shinsei Publishing. ISBN 4405080593.
- Lu Shengli (2006). Combat Techniques of Taiji, Xingyi, and Bagua: Principles and Practices of Internal Martial Arts. Translated by Zhang Yun. Blue Snake Books. ISBN 9781583941454.
- Matsuda, Ryuchi; Kotatsu Nogami (1986). 中国伝統開門八極拳 実戦武術の精粋 通備門の全容 [Chinese Tradition Opening the Gate of Bajiquan: The Essence of Practical Martial Arts, the Full Picture of Pathway] (in Japanese). Fukushodo. ISBN 4405080593.
