= Memoirs of a Madman =

Autobiographical book by Gustave Flaubert

Memoirs of a Madman (French: Mémoires d'un fou) is an autobiographical text written by Gustave Flaubert in 1838. The next year, Flaubert dedicated it to his friend, Alfred Le Poittevin. The manuscript changed hands twice before being finally published in La Revue Blanche from December 1900 to February 1901, some twenty years after Flaubert's death.

== Plot summary ==
Memoirs of a Madman alternates between the narrator's musings on the present and his memories of the past. In the sections that deal with the present, the narrator takes a bleak outlook on life, discussing writing, sanity, and death.

More attention has been given to the memories of his past. In one section, he recalls a summer near the ocean when he is fifteen. There he meets and falls in love with a married woman named Maria (thought to be based on Elisa Schlésinger, who would later influence his Sentimental Education). Later in the work, he will remember returning to the seashore many years later to look for her again unsuccessfully. A second episode concerns his meeting two young English girls, one of whom seems to fall in love with him. Still in love with Maria, he cannot return the girl's emotions, and she moves away.
