= Dictionary of Received Ideas =

Satirical book by Gustave Flaubert

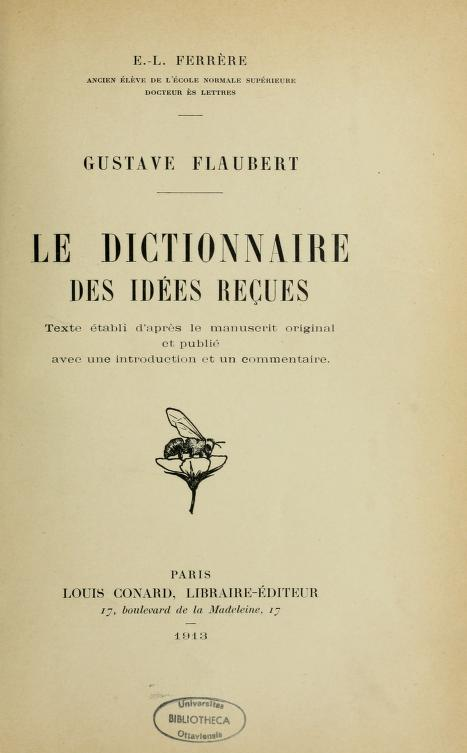
- Author: Gustave Flaubert
- Original title: Dictionnaire des idées reçues
- Language: French
- Genre: Satire
- Publication date: 1911-13

The Dictionary of Received Ideas (or Dictionary of Accepted Ideas; in French, Le Dictionnaire des idées reçues) is a short satirical work collected and published in 1911–13 from notes compiled by Gustave Flaubert during the 1870s, lampooning the clichés endemic to French society under the Second French Empire. It takes the form of a dictionary of automatic thoughts and platitudes, self-contradictory and insipid. It is often paired with the Sottisier (a collection of stupid quotations taken from the books of famous writers).

== Purpose ==
At the time of Flaubert's death, it was unclear whether he intended eventually to publish it separately, or as an appendix to his unfinished novel Bouvard et Pécuchet. In some of his notes, it seems that Flaubert intended the dictionary to be taken as the final creation of the two protagonists. In other notes, it seems the Sottisier is intended as their final work. Flaubert's two main themes are the "castigation of the cliché" and "an attack on misinformation, prejudice and incoherence as regards matters of fact".

== Background ==
The idea of a spoof encyclopedia had fascinated him all his life. As a child, he had amused himself by writing down the absurd utterances of a friend of his mother's, and over the course of his career he speculated as to the best format for a compilation of stupidities. In a letter to Louis Bouilhet from 1850, Flaubert wrote:

Such a book, with a good preface in which the motive would be stated to be the desire to bring the nation back to Tradition, Order and Sound Conventions—all this so phrased that the reader would not know whether or not his leg was being pulled—such a book would certainly be unusual, even likely to succeed, because it would be entirely up to the minute.

He wrote to Louise Colet in 1852:

No law could attack me, though I should attack everything. It would be the justification of Whatever is, is right. I should sacrifice the great men to all the nitwits, the martyrs to all the executioners, and do it in a style carried to the wildest pitch—fireworks... After reading the book, one would be afraid to talk, for fear of using one of the phrases in it.

== Examples ==
- ABSINTHE. Extra-violent poison: one glass and you're dead. Newspapermen drink it as they write their copy. Has killed more soldiers than the Bedouin.
- ARCHIMEDES. On hearing his name, shout "Eureka!" Or else: "Give me a fulcrum and I will move the world." There is also Archimedes' screw, but you are not expected to know what it is.
- ARTS. Are quite useless, since they are replaced by machines that manufacture even more quickly.
- FEUDALISM. No need to have one single precise notion about it: thunder against.
- OMEGA. Second letter of the Greek alphabet. [reference to alpha and omega]
- THIRTEEN. Avoid being thirteen at table; it brings bad luck. The sceptics should not fail to crack jokes: "What is the difference? I'll eat enough for two!" Or again, if there are ladies, ask if any is pregnant.
- WALTZ. Wax indignant about. A lascivious, impure dance that should only be danced by old ladies.

== Parallels ==
The dictionary is comparable in many respects to Ambrose Bierce's The Devil's Dictionary, but takes the opposite tack by affirming all the commonplace notions.

== Influence ==
The British impresario and humorist Willie Donaldson was long interested in the Dictionary; and, as "Henry Root", published something similar for the Britain of the 1980s: Henry Root's World of Knowledge. (Note: London: Weidenfeld & Nicolson, 1982; ISBN 0297780972 (hardback). London: Futura, 1983; ISBN 0708823181 (paperback).)

== See also ==
- Commonplace book
- Idée reçue
