= Piguaquan =

Chinese martial art

Pigua Zhang 劈掛拳
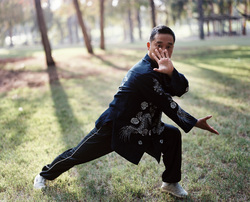
- Zhou Jing Xuan demonstrating Pigua Zhang's Dan Pi Zhang (single splitting palm)
- Also known as: Pigua Quan, Pi Kua, Axe-hitch boxing
- Focus: Striking with whipping motions and heavy hands. Use of the Dao (Chinese broadsword), Short stick, Medium staff (Feng Mo Gun) and Miao Dao (Chinese longsword)
- Hardness: Hard, but has soft elements
- Country of origin: China
- Creator: Nampi lineage: Guo Dafa; Yanshan lineage: Zhuo Baomei
- Famous practitioners: Nampi lineage: Guo Changsheng; Yanshan lineage: Ma Yingtu
- Parenthood: Northern Chinese martial arts, Tongbeiquan
- Olympic sport: No

Piguaquan (Chinese: 劈挂拳; lit. 'chop-hanging fist'), also known as Piguazhang (Chinese: 劈挂掌; lit. 'chop-hanging palm') due to its emphasis on palm techniques, is often practiced along with Bajiquan (Chinese: 八极拳; lit. 'eight extremes fist') and is a style of wushu (Chinese martial arts) that features explosive, long-range power. It originated in Cangzhou, a prefecture in Hebei Province of North China, but today is also well known in other locales, including Taiwan. Piguaquan's power is from the accelerational force of the arms which are often in rotation. The hip movement in Piguaquan is more subtle and gentle compared to Bajiquan, because you only need enough to guide the big chops whereas in Bajiquan, the hammers, punches, elbows and swings rely completely on the quick and powerful rotation of the hips, and sink to bring its power out.

== Contemporary History ==
Piguaquan has a long rich history. During middle Ming dynasty it has already spread amongst the martial arts practitioners amongst the common people. During the middle Qing dynasty there are two major branches of Piguaquan in Cangzhou. One branch led by Guo Dafa of Nanpi village, who had remarkable martial prowess that led to him later becoming an imperial bodyguard. The other branch was led by Zhuo Baomei of Yanshan village, who specialized in the Qinglong forms and Pigua slow forms.

In 1928, the Nationalist Republic established Central Guoshu Institute where Ma Yingtu (1898–1956) and Guo Changsheng, practitioner of the Yanshan and Nanpi lineages were martial arts coaches. The two soon became friends. After in-depth study and analysis, taking elements from the two lineages and combining them into one new style, while also adding skills from the 24 forms of Tongbeiquan. The two professors also incorporated weaponry into the style, including Feng Mo (Crazy Demon) Staff, Pigua Dao (Pigua broadsword), and Miao Dao forms, filling the void of lacking weaponry in the old lineages.

== Relationship with Bajiquan ==
Piguaquan and Bajiquan are often taught as complementary martial arts, especially in Taiwan. In fact, there is a Chinese martial arts proverb that goes: "When pigua is added to baji, gods and demons will all be terrified. When baji is added to pigua, heroes will sigh knowing they are no match against it." (八極參劈掛，神鬼都害怕。劈掛參八極，英雄嘆莫及)

In mainland China, Piguaquan is still often practiced as a stand-alone art as well. Among some lineages of the art in mainland China, there had developed practice forms (taolu) and methods which are called "Baji-Pigua", which combine elements from both arts.

Historically, many famous teachers, such as Liu Yunqiao and Ma Fengtu have practiced and taught both arts. In the present day, this tradition continuous among various teachers, such as Su Yu-chang, Tony Yang, Adam Hsu (United States) and Zhou Jingxuan (mainland China).

== In popular culture ==
Pigua Zhang is one of the styles used by the female character Ling Xiaoyu in the Tekken video game franchise, Helena Douglas in the Dead or Alive series, Scorpion in Mortal Kombat: Deadly Alliance, and Hotaru in Mortal Kombat: Deception and Mortal Kombat: Armageddon. Also is shown by Xiuying Hong from Shenmue, sometimes along with some moves from Bajiquan.

Pigua Zhang is one of the fighting styles of the character Hermit (Tanimoto Natsu) in the Japanese manga and anime series History's Strongest Disciple Kenichi along with Bajiquan.

The art has also been featured in the Japanese manga series Kenji.
