= Armance (novel) =

1827 novel by Stendhal

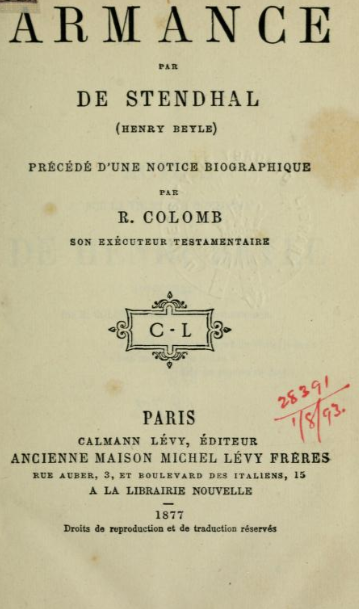
- Title page for Armance (1877)
- Author: Stendhal (Henri Marie Beyle)
- Original title: Armance
- Language: French
- Published: 1827
- Publication place: France

Armance is a romance novel set during the Bourbon Restoration by French writer Stendhal, published anonymously in 1827. It was Stendhal's first novel, though he had published essays and critical works on literature, art, and travel since 1815.

== Plot ==
Octave de Malivert, a taciturn but brilliant young man barely out of the École Polytechnique, is attracted to Armance Zohiloff, who shares his feelings. The novel describes how a series of misunderstandings have kept the lovers Armance and Octave divided. A series of clues suggest that Octave is impotent as a result of a severe accident. Octave is experiencing a deep inner turmoil; he himself illustrates the pain of the century's romantics. When the pair do eventually marry, the slanders of a rival convince Octave that Armance had married only out of selfishness. Octave leaves to fight in Greece, and dies there of sorrow.

== Theme ==
Armance is based on the theme of Olivier, a novel by the Duchess Claire de Duras. In Olivier, the protagonist cannot marry the Comtesse de Nangis because of a secret. Although the secret is never explicitly revealed in the novel, it is generally understood to be impotence, or more subtly, homosexuality. Impotence was sometimes used as a subterfuge for male homosexuality in early 19th-century French literature, since homosexuality was considered too salacious to be openly addressed at the time.

== Critical reception ==
André Gide regarded this novel as the best of Stendhal's novels, whom he was grateful to for having created a helpless lover, even if he reproached him for having eluded the fate of this love: "I can hardly convince myself that Armance, as painted for us by Stendhal, would have been suited by it."

In Umberto Eco's novel The Prague Cemetery, the protagonist Simone Simonini pleads with another character, Yuliana Glinka, that he suffers the same fate as Stendhal's Octave de Malivert—whose readers had long speculated about—and thus can't pursue the offer she had made him.

In Luca Guadagnino's Oscar-winning film Call Me by Your Name, one of two main characters plays with this book in his hands at the table, thinking about his first homosexual encounter with the other protagonist.
