= Huo Yuanjia (disambiguation) =

Huo Yuanjia or Huo Yuan Jia or Fok Yuen Gap may refer to

- Huo Yuanjia, a Chinese martial artist and founder of Chin Woo Athletic Association
- Films and television series bearing the Chinese title "霍元甲" (Huo Yuanjia)
  - Fearless (2006 film), a 2006 film starring Jet Li
  - Legend of a Fighter, a 1982 film starring Bryan Leung
  - The Legendary Fok, a 1981 television series starring Wong Yuen-sun and Bruce Leung
  - Huo Yuanjia (2001 TV series), a 2001 television series starring Vincent Zhao and Wu Yue
  - Huo Yuanjia (2008 TV series), also known as The Legendary Fok 2008, a 2008 television series starring Ekin Cheng and Jordan Chan
- Huo Yuanjia, a song by Jay Chou that is also the theme song for the 2006 film Fearless
