= Legend of the Fist =

Legend of the Fist may refer to:

- Legend of the Fist: Chen Zhen, a 2008 TV series starring Jordan Chan as Chen Zhen
- Legend of the Fist: The Return of Chen Zhen, a 2010 film starring Donnie Yen as Chen Zhen

== See also ==
- Fist of Legend, a 1994 film starring Jet Li as Chen Zhen
- Chen Zhen (character), a fictional Chinese kung fu hero
- Fists of Legend, a 2013 South Korean film
