= Lian Cheng Jue (disambiguation) =

Lian Cheng Jue may refer to:

- A Deadly Secret, known as Lian Cheng Jue (or Liancheng Jue) in Chinese, is a novel by Jin Yong. Alternate English translations of the title include Secret of the Linked Cities and Requiem of Ling Sing.
- Adaptations of the novel:
  - A Deadly Secret (film), a 1980 Hong Kong film
  - Deadly Secret, a 1989 Hong Kong television series
  - Lian Cheng Jue (TV series), a 2004 Chinese television series
