= Deadly Secret (disambiguation) =

Deadly Secret may refer to:

== Book ==
- A Deadly Secret, a 1963 wuxia novel
- Deadly Secrets: The CIA-Mafia War Against Castro & the Assassination of J.F.K., a 1981 non-fiction book by William W. Turner and Warren Hinckle
- A Deadly Secret: The Strange Disappearance of Kathie Durst, a 2003 book about Robert Durst

== Film and television ==
- A Deadly Secret (film), a 1980 Hong Kong film
- Deadly Secret, a 1989 Hong Kong television series
