= Fist of Legend =

1994 Hong Kong martial arts film

- Hong Kong film poster
- 精武英雄
- Directed by: Gordon Chan
- Written by: Gordon Chan; Lam Kee-to; Kim Yip
- Based on: Fist of Fury by Lo Wei
- Produced by: Jet Li
- Starring: Jet Li; Chin Siu-ho; Shinobu Nakayama; Billy Chow; Yasuaki Kurata; Paul Chun
- Cinematography: Derek Wan
- Edited by: Chan Ki-hop
- Music by: Joseph Koo
- Production company: Eastern Production
- Distributed by: Golden Harvest
- Release date: 22 December 1994
- Running time: 103 minutes
- Country: Hong Kong
- Languages: Cantonese; Japanese
- Box office: HK$14.8 million

Fist of Legend (精武英雄) is a 1994 Hong Kong martial arts film directed by Gordon Chan from a screenplay by Chan, Lam Kee-to, and Kim Yip. It features martial arts choreography by Yuen Woo-ping and was produced by Jet Li, who also starred in the lead role of Chen Zhen. It is a remake of the 1972 martial arts film Fist of Fury starring Bruce Lee.

Set in Shanghai in 1914 as World War I breaks out, Fist of Legend follows Chen as he investigates his master Huo Yuanjia's death at the hands of the Imperial Japanese troops stationed in Shanghai's Japanese settlement. The synopsis of the international version incorrectly states that the story takes place in 1937 whereas the Chinese version states that the story is set ″in the early years of the Republic of China″. The film co-starred Chin Siu-ho, Yasuaki Kurata, Shinobu Nakayama, Billy Chow, and Paul Chun. It was released by Golden Harvest on 22 December 1994. The film is considered one of Jet Li's best films, and one of the best martial arts films of all time.

== Synopsis ==
In 1914, Chinese martial artist Chen Zhen studies at Kyoto University, where he faces harassment from Japanese ultranationalists but earns the respect of karate master Fumio Funakoshi. Chen learns that his master, Huo Yuanjia, has died after losing a match to Japanese fighter Akutagawa, so he returns to Shanghai. Aboard the ship bringing him back home are Japanese troops sailing to lay siege to the German concession of Tsingtao as World War I breaks out. Upon arriving in Shanghai, Chen suspects foul play and challenges Akutagawa, whom he easily defeats. He then has his master's body exhumed for an autopsy, which reveals that Huo Yuanjia was poisoned before the match.

Chen's victory makes him a hero at the Jingwu School, but that leads to tensions between him and his master's son, Huo Ting'en. Meanwhile, Japanese general Fujita kills Akutagawa for questioning the match's integrity, and frames Chen for the murder. Chen is arrested but acquitted when Mitsuko, a Japanese woman with whom he is romantically involved, provides an alibi. Although he is cleared, Chen is criticized by his fellow Jingwu School members for his relationship with Mitsuko, so he leaves Jingwu School after defeating Huo Ting'en in a challenge.

As Japanese hostility escalates, Funakoshi fights and defeats Chen but spares him, advising him to adapt his technique. Huo Ting'en later reconciles with Chen and teaches him the Huo family's Mizong Fist. Mitsuko leaves for Japan, hoping Chen will follow.

Chen and Huo Ting'en confront Fujita, who is revealed to be responsible for Huo Yuanjia's death. After a brutal fight, Chen kills Fujita in self-defense. To prevent the incident from being used to justify war, Chen agrees to take responsibility, but the Japanese ambassador secretly fakes Chen's execution. Jingwu School survives and expands across China, while Chen leaves Shanghai, intending to reunite with Mitsuko.

== Cast ==
- Jet Li as Chen Zhen
- Chin Siu-ho as Huo Ting'en
- Yasuaki Kurata as Fumio Funakoshi
- Shinobu Nakayama as Mitsuko Yamada
- Billy Chow as Gō Fujita
- Jackson Lau as Akutagawa Ryūichi
- Paul Chun as Nong Jinsun
- Yuen Cheung-yan as the Inspector
- Ada Choi as Xiaohong
- Toshimichi Takahashi as the Japanese ambassador

== Reception ==
=== Box office ===
Though Fist of Legend is widely considered one of Li's best films, during the downturn period of the Hong Kong film industry, its HK$14,785,382 box office gross was considered a disappointment. By comparison, Li's Fong Sai-yuk grossed over HK$30 million, and Fong Sai-yuk II grossed HK$23 million, but its overall box office from other countries was good.

In South Korea, the film sold 181,760 tickets in Seoul City.

=== Critical response ===
The film holds a 100% rating on Rotten Tomatoes.

=== Television ===
In the United Kingdom, the film (released as Jet Li's Fist of Legend) was watched by 1.1 million viewers on television in 2004, making it the year's seventh most-watched foreign-language film on television (below six other Hong Kong action films).

== Alternate versions ==
=== Miramax ===
The English-dubbed U.S. release by Miramax and Buena Vista Distribution contains four specific mistranslations that drastically alter the meaning of the film as a whole.

1. Before Chen leaves Japan, Mitsuko asks him if he hates the Japanese. In the U.S. version he replies, "I don't hate". In the Hong Kong version he replies, "I don't know".
2. In the U.S. version of the scene where Chen fights Fumio, Fumio asks him what the most effective way to defeat an enemy is. Chen replies that the most effective way is to focus one's energy and strike, and Fumio agrees with him. In the Hong Kong version, they begin by discussing their match. Chen says that the purpose of martial arts is to defeat an enemy. Fumio says, "No, you're wrong. The best way to defeat your enemy is to use a gun. Martial arts is about personal development". The original line was a nod to Bruce Lee, who was quoted during the production of Enter the Dragon as "Nowadays you don't go around on the street kicking people, punching people — because if you do (makes gun shape with hand), well that's it — I don't care how good you are".
3. Prior to the final fight sequence in the U.S. version, Chen and Huo face Fujita who holds up a sign reading Dongya Bingfu (東亞病夫) and he tells them that the sign says, "Jingwu is closed". The Chinese characters are commonly translated to "Sick men of the East" and is used as a famous reference to Fist of Fury. The subtitles in the Hong Kong version translate the sign correctly.
4. At the end in the U.S. version, Chen's driver asks him if he will go to be with Mitsuko. Chen responds, "If I no longer have a country, at least I can still be with the woman I love". His response in the Hong Kong version is, "Where is war with Japan most likely to break out?" The driver says, "Manchuria" and he says, "We'll go to Manchuria then".

With regard to footage, this version deletes the final moments of students training and contains a brand new set of opening (animated) and closing credits in English, abandoning the previous ones completely. The international version also gives the wrong date for the story, stating that it takes place in 1937. The film is actually set in 1914, at the outbreak of World War I.

=== Taiwan ===
Compared to the Hong Kong version, the 106-minute Mandarin-dubbed Taiwanese version contains the following footage:

1. An extension to the scene where Fujita gives a harsh lecture to several men, prior to his order to spy on certain Japanese individuals.
2. An extension of the scene with Chen after bowing to his master's shrine where Liu Zhensheng then hands over a suitcase to Chen and the latter proceeds to leave. Prior to following him, Mitsuko also respectfully bows.
3. An entire scene where Hill Hung is looking for Huo Ting'en at a brothel, only to find him smoking opium with a prostitute.
4. An entire scene where Hill Hung brings tea to Huo Ting'en, the night prior to the final match.
5. An extension of Fumio talking with the ambassador, prior to the former winning the Renju game.
6. After the final fight ends, a very small extension sees the Japanese soldiers pause for a moment prior to entering the Dojo.

In the Mandarin soundtracks of the film, there is background music when Chen fights Huo, but in the Cantonese soundtrack, the music only plays after Chen performs a Capoeira-style kick later on in the fight.

=== Hong Kong ===
The Hong Kong version in return, has the following unique footage:

1. A reaction shot of the cook in the kitchen (followed by a shot from Huo Yuanjia's shrine) after Uncle Nong dispatches students to search for Huo Ting'en.
2. A few seconds of Chen Zhen feigning death to Fujita.
3. After the credits finish, we see the crew waving to the camera.

Both Hong Kong and Taiwanese version have slightly different end credits.

== Home media ==
=== DVD ===
==== Ritek ====
In 1997, the first DVD was released by Ritek in Taiwan, which fans later reported to be an "uncut" version. This has been a widely held misconception - whilst this version does carry some more footage (as a Taiwanese version), it is in turn missing a few moments that the Hong Kong version has.

==== Miramax ====
On 15 February 2000, Miramax issued a DVD of this film in the U.S. (later in the U.K. by Hollywood Pictures on VHS first, then DVD later on 29 March 2002). Whilst it featured better visual quality than any other release, it immediately caused an uproar with the Hong Kong Cinema fan community because it contained only a new English dub/score with alterations to the original dialogue and no original Cantonese option, a defect shared with many of their Hong Kong-acquired titles.

==== HKVideo ====
On 20 March 2002, the first official DVD of the Hong Kong version with a Cantonese soundtrack was issued by HKVideo in France, but it contained no English subtitles. One notable difference to other versions carrying a Chinese/Taiwanese version is that it doesn't contain the ending text describing the aftermath of Jingwu School, but is otherwise the same and, bar a few missing frames, uncut.

==== Maxam ====
A lesser-known DVD was issued on 25 March 2005 by Japanese distributor Maxam which contains the Hong Kong version (and its ending text) in complete form, but no English subtitles.

==== Dragon Dynasty ====
A R1 2-DVD "Ultimate Edition" was released on 9 September 2008 from The Weinstein Company's Dragon Dynasty label in America, which features many extras and the original Cantonese soundtrack with English subtitles, marking the first official DVD release to do so. This version was also released in Australia (Region 4), in single disk. However, this is still visually the previous US version with the Cantonese soundtrack edited to fit its visuals. The subtitles revert to dubtitles towards the end - relying on the previous incorrectly transcribed "Sick Men Of Asia" sign and story-changing ending from Miramax's English dub.

==== New Age 21/HMH ====
German-issued DVDs from distributor 'New Age 21' and 'HMH' were released in November 2008 in an uncut state and contain a Cantonese soundtrack with English subtitles.

==== Other releases ====
Other uncut English-subtitled releases of the Hong Kong Cantonese-language versions (now OOP) include the US Tai Seng VHS (released on 20 October 2000), the Australian Chinatown Video VHS, the U.K. Made in Hong Kong VHS (released on 1 October 1999), and the Mei Ah VCD, VHS and LD.

The Malaysian Speedy VCD also contains a similar version, but enforces cuts to some scenes for violence:

1. Fujita kneeing Ryōichi Akutagawa's back.
2. Huo Ting'en hitting his head on a window during the finale.
3. Chen Zhen hitting his head on a window during the finale.

The Spanish Manga Films DVD titled El Mejor Luchador (released on 24 October 2001) and a slightly edited Indian Diskovery VCD titled The Hitter: Fist of the Legend contain an English-dubbed version intended for export to English-speaking territories. This version has aired occasionally on US TV with a Miramax ident instead of their own produced version.

=== Blu-ray ===
Cine Asia released a Blu-ray version on 22 March 2010 in the UK and on 20 April in USA.

== Legacy ==
Fist of Legend inspired the Wachowskis to hire choreographer Yuen Woo-ping for the fight scenes in The Matrix (1999). The style of fighting in the two films bears some resemblance.

In 1996, an unofficial sequel titled Fists of Legends 2: Iron Bodyguards was released starring Jet Le (not Jet Li).

Later films have also been influenced by Fist of Legend. Hitman contains a scene involving the main character using a belt as a weapon as seen in Fist of Legend. The more realistic and less wire-driven fight choreography seen in Kiss of the Dragon was a result of fan criticism to Corey Yuen's choreography in Romeo Must Die and preference for the style seen in Fist of Legend.

In 2006, Jet Li played his character's teacher, Huo Yuanjia, in Fearless.

In 2010, Gordon Chan and Andrew Lau produced a continuation of this film titled Legend of the Fist: The Return of Chen Zhen with Donnie Yen as Chen Zhen in his thirties.

== See also ==
- Jet Li filmography
