= The Legendary Fok =

- DVD cover art
- 大俠霍元甲
- Genre: Martial arts, historical
- Screenplay by: Cheung Wah-piu
- Directed by: Tsui Siu-ming
- Starring: Wong Yuen-sun; Bruce Leung; Michelle Yim; Bonnie Ngai
- Opening theme: "The Great Wall Never Falls" (萬里長城永不倒) by Johnny Yip
- Composer: Michael Lai
- Country of origin: Hong Kong
- Original language: Cantonese
- No. of episodes: 20

Production
- Producer: Tsui Siu-ming
- Production location: Hong Kong
- Running time: 45 minutes per episode

Original release
- Network: RTV
- Release: 28 September 1981

The Legendary Fok (大俠霍元甲) is a Hong Kong television series loosely based on the life of the Chinese martial artist Huo Yuanjia (Fok Yuen-gap). It includes a subplot based on the story of Chen Zhen (Chan Zan), a fictional apprentice of Huo Yuanjia and the protagonist of the 1972 film Fist of Fury. The series was first broadcast in 1981 on RTV in Hong Kong.

== Cast ==
- Wong Yuen-sun as Huo Yuanjia
- Bruce Leung as Chen Zhen
- Michelle Yim as Zhao Qiannan
- Bonnie Ngai as Wang Xiuzhi (Sakurako)
- Newton Lai as Long Haisheng
- Bill Tung as Huo Endi
- Cheng Lui as Zhao Xingxian
- Tsui Siu-ming as Cheng Tianxiao
- Mak Tin-yan as Wang Xiwen (Tanaka)
- Lau Kong as Huo Yuanwu
- Tam Wing-kit as Liu Zhensheng
- Yeung Kar-on as Lu Da'an
- Gam San as Zhao Zhennan
- Yip Tin-hang as Zhao Zhenbei
- Ng Kwok-sing as Huo Yuanying
- Ng Wui as Zhang Bing (Qiuye)

== Remake ==
A remake of the series, Huo Yuanjia (The Legendary Fok 2008), was released in 2008. It was directed by Kuk Kwok-leung and starred Ekin Cheng, Jordan Chan, Zhou Muyin, Bryan Leung, Ding Li and Qu Yue.

The opening theme song "The Great Wall Never Falls", performed by Johnny Yip, was reused as the opening theme song of Huo Yuanjia (2008) and Huo Yuanjia (2001). However, in Huo Yuanjia (2001), the song was sung in Mandarin instead of Cantonese and was not sung by Yip.
