= Jingwu Yingxiong Chen Zhen =

- DVD cover art
- 精武英雄陈真
- Genre: Martial arts
- Directed by: Liu Fengsheng; Choi Jing-shing
- Starring: Wu Yue; Vincent Zhao; Qi Yan; Yu Rongguang
- Composer: Zhonghua Xiongying
- Country of origin: China
- Original language: Mandarin
- No. of episodes: 32

Production
- Producer: Jia Yun
- Production location: China
- Running time: 45 minutes per episode
- Production company: Pikawang Film Company

Related
- Huo Yuanjia (2001)

Jingwu Yingxiong Chen Zhen (精武英雄陈真), also known as Legend of Chen Zhen, is a Chinese television series about Chen Zhen, a fictional apprentice of the Chinese martial artist Huo Yuanjia. The series is a sequel to the 2001 television series The Legend of Huo Yuanjia, with Wu Yue reprising his role as Chen Zhen.

== Synopsis ==
The series is set in the Warlord Era of early 20th-century China. Chen Zhen, an apprentice of Huo Yuanjia, has been hiding in Foshan after avenging his master. One day, he receives a message and decides to return to Shanghai, where he sees a brothel standing on the former location of the Jingwu School founded by his master. He faces the insurmountable task of rebuilding the Jingwu School while shouldering the responsibility of raising his master's orphaned son, Huo Dongjue. At the same time, he runs into trouble with the mob and has to hide from the police too.

Chen Zhen's friend, Xi Feiyang, was originally a teacher who came to Shanghai with a passion to serve his country. However, his dreams were shattered when his wife and unborn child were killed by gangsters. Xi Feiyang realises that in such a chaotic era, the only way to survive is to resort to violence, so he gets involved in the criminal underworld and eventually becomes a powerful mob boss. On the other hand, although Chen Zhen ultimately revives his master's legacy and restores the Jingwu School to its former glory, he is betrayed by his fellows and ends up badly injured.

In the meantime, the Japanese are aggressively making plans for another invasion of China. The Japanese government sends Tenkō Jiro, the best fighter in Japan, to challenge Chen Zhen. After Tenkō Jiro loses to Chen Zhen in a fight, he comes to the conclusion that Japan can never conquer China. Just then, Chen Zhen discovers another sinister plot by the Japanese to invade China. Xi Feiyang sacrifices himself to save Chen Zhen.

== Cast ==
- Wu Yue as Chen Zhen
- Vincent Zhao as Huo Yuanjia
- Qi Yan as Tang Xiaoting
- Yu Rongguang as Xi Feiyang
- Yaqi as Su Jiumei
- He Sirong as Senhyaku Keiko (Qianbai Huizi)
- Zhou Yue as He Ziyi
- Zhao Yansong as Liu Zhensheng
- Wang Huichun as Du Meng
- Zhuo Fan as Tenkō Jiro (Tiangang Cilang)
- Xie Yunshan as Huo Dongjue
- Jin Song as Fishmonger Qiang
- Kou Zhanwen as Du Qimei
- Zhao Yi as Xu Aji
