= Chen Zhen (character) =

Fictional character

- Bruce Lee as Chen Zhen in Fist of Fury: The Chinese Connection
- First appearance: Fist of Fury: The Chinese Connection (1972)
- Last appearance: Legend of the Fist: The Return of Chen Zhen (2010)
- Created by: Ni Kuang
- Based on: Chen Zhen
- Portrayed by: Bruce Lee (1972); Bruce Leung (1981, 1982, 2001); Jet Li (1994); Dragon Shek Tianlong Shi (1998); Donnie Yen (1995, 2010); Wu Yue (2001); Tsui Siu-lung (2004); Jordan Chan (2008); Ashton Chen (2020)

In-universe information
- Gender: Male
- Occupation: Martial artist
- Nationality: Chinese
- Master: Huo Yuanjia
- Affiliations: Jingwu School
- Martial arts: Hong Fist; Karate (Note: Chen Zhen learns karate during his overseas studies in Japan in Huo Yuanjia (2001).); Mizong Fist (Note: Huo Yuanjia teaches Chen Zhen the Mizong Fist in most of the adaptations, especially television series. In Fist of Legend, Huo Yuanjia's son, Huo Ting'en, teaches Chen Zhen the skill.); Nunchaku-do (Note: Chen Zhen uses a nunchaku in Fist of Fury and many other remakes. In Fist of Legend, he uses an ordinary leather belt as if it were a nunchaku, rather than the weapon itself.)

Chen Zhen (陳真; 陈真; Chén Zhēn; Can^{4} Zan^{1}) is a fictional character created by Hong Kong writer Ni Kuang. First portrayed by Bruce Lee in the 1972 film Fist of Fury: The Chinese Connection, the character has been the subject of numerous film and television series, including remakes and adaptations of Fist of Fury. Many notable actors, including Jet Li and Donnie Yen, have portrayed Chen Zhen on screen after Bruce Lee. Although Chen Zhen's story varies in the different remakes and adaptations, most have an ending similar to the original Fist of Fury.

== Creation ==
Chen Zhen was often believed to be based on Liu Zhensheng (劉振聲), an apprentice of Huo Yuanjia, a Chinese martial artist who lived during the late Qing dynasty.

In 2007, Hong Kong writer Ni Kuang revealed in his RTHK talkshow Ni Kuang’s View of the World (倪匡看世界) that Chen Zhen was a fictional character, and that plaque with the Chinese phase 東亞病夫 (Sick man of East Asia) for the 1972 film Fist of Fury was also calligraphed by him.

Ni Kuang had previously clarified in the Asia Television's Celebrity Talk Show in 1989 that Chen Zhen was a real person and that the name came from the list of people for funeral arrangement from Huo Yuanjia's obituary in the newspaper.

According to Hong Kong director Gordon Chan of the 1994 film Fist of Legend, he stated that Chen Zhen was indeed a real person, but the story of Chen Zhen that the audience are watching was entirely fictional. Chan revealed that the creator Ni Kuang discovered the name Chen Zhen while looking through the obituary of Huo Yuanjia, where it appeared as the name of one of Huo's disciples. Intrigued by the name, Ni Kuang went on to craft the story based from it. Hong Kong senior media personality Lau Tin-chi also confirmed the name was based from a person on Huo Yuanjia’s funeral arrangement list, whom Ni Kuang then designated it as Huo Yuanjia’s disciple.

In conclusion, the name Chen Zhen only appeared in among the list of people in the obituary at Huo Yuanjia's funeral, and his heroic deeds are mostly based on folk tales, films and television works. Furthermore, Huo Zizai (霍自在), the great-grandson of Huo Yuanjia, stated that Chen Zhen was not one of Huo Yuanjia's disciples, while another great-grandson, Huo Zizheng (霍自正), went on in 2006 and stated that Huo had only had one disciple, Liu Zhensheng.

== Background ==
Chen Zhen is an apprentice of the Chinese martial artist Huo Yuanjia, who founded the Jingwu School in 1910. After Huo Yuanjia meets his demise under dubious circumstances, Chen Zhen discovers that his master was poisoned by their rivals from a Japanese dojo in Hongkou District, Shanghai. The furious apprentice seeks to bring the murderers to justice and embarks on a brutal quest to avenge Huo Yuanjia and revive his master's legacy, the "Jingwu Spirit".

== Character features ==
During the premiere of Legend of the Fist: The Return of Chen Zhen in September 2010, when reporters asked Donnie Yen on the differences between his Chen Zhen and the earlier versions, Yen replied: "Chen Zhen is Bruce Lee." He said that Lee's portrayal of Chen Zhen in Fist of Fury: The Chinese Connection (1972) served as the foundation for subsequent depictions of the character. He further explained that certain features of his character, such as the white Mao suit and the use of nunchaku, were based on Lee's Chen Zhen. However, there were differences in movements and overall character design between his Chen Zhen and Lee's. Since Legend of the Fist: The Return of Chen Zhen pays tribute to Lee, Yen decided to retain the white Mao suit and the use of nunchaku in the final dojo fight scene, in addition to repeating Chen Zhen's famous line: "The Chinese are not sick men of East Asia!".

== Appearances in media ==
Note: There are many remakes and sequels that are not possible to list here.

=== Film ===
- Fist of Fury: The Chinese Connection (精武門), a 1972 film starring Bruce Lee as Chen Zhen. This was the first appearance of Chen Zhen on screen.
- New Fist of Fury (新精武門), a 1976 sequel to Fist of Fury: The Chinese Connection. In this film, Chen Zhen's fiancée (portrayed by Nora Miao) meets a young Taiwanese boy, Lung (portrayed by Jackie Chan), who will become Chen Zhen's successor. Chan had previously appeared as a stuntman in the original film.
- Fist of Fury Part II: Fistful of the Dragon, a 1977 Bruceploitation which is the second sequel.
- Fist of Fury Part III: Jeet Kune the Claws and the Supreme Kung Fu, a 1978 Bruceploitation threequel to Fist of Fury Part II: Fistful of the Dragon.
- Fist of Legend (精武英雄), a 1994 loose remake of Fist of Fury: The Chinese Connection, starring Jet Li as Chen Zhen. In the film, Chen Zhen fights to salvage Jingwu School's reputation after Huo Yuanjia's death. He defeats a Japanese general responsible for his master's death and escapes from Shanghai.
- Fist of Fury 4: Return of Dragon, a 1998 Bruceploitation sequel to Fist of Fury: The Chinese Connection starring Dragon Shek Tianlong Shi as Chen Zhen, is a direct sequel to the original that ignores the Bruce Li and Jackie Chan films.
- Hero Youngster: Juvenile Chen Zhen (少年陳真), a 2004 film starring Tsui Siu-lung as a younger Chen Zhen. In this film, Chen Zhen rescues a Manchu princess, starting an adventure in which he helps the princess and a Chinese resistance fighter (portrayed by Yuen Biao) defend China from Japanese invaders.
- Fearless, a 2006 film in which Jet Li stars as Huo Yuanjia, the teacher of Chen Zen.
- Legend of the Fist: The Return of Chen Zhen (精武風雲 - 陳真), a 2010 film starring Donnie Yen as Chen Zhen. In this film, after killing Huo Yuanjia's murderers, Chen Zhen leaves China to help the Allies fight the Germans in France during World War I. He returns to China after the war and joins an underground resistance movement in Shanghai to stop the Japanese from invading China just before World War II. Chen Zhen disguises himself as a masked vigilante (based on the Green Hornet's sidekick Kato).

=== Television ===
- The Legendary Fok (大俠霍元甲), a 1981 Hong Kong television series loosely based on the life of Huo Yuanjia. Wong Yuen-sun and Bruce Leung portrayed Huo Yuanjia and Chen Zhen respectively.
- The Fist (陳真), a 1982 sequel to The Legendary Fok. Bruce Leung reprised his role as Chen Zhen with a new storyline. This ATV production co-starred Candice Yu, Lau Wai-man, Choi King-fai, and Bill Tung. In this series, Chen Zhen becomes a wanted criminal after avenging Huo Yuanjia. With assistance from the mayor of Shanghai, he escapes by faking his own death, moves to Beijing with Huo Yuanjia's son, and leads a reclusive life under a fake name. However, his true identity is revealed when he gets drawn into a conflict with Satō, a Japanese official. Although his involvement in the conflict places his life in danger, it also ignites his nationalist fervour. While Satō plans his revenge, Chen Zhen resolves to reopen Huo Yuanjia's Jingwu School to spread the Jingwu spirit.
- Fist of Fury (精武門), a 1995 television series based on the 1972 film of the same title, produced by ATV and starring Donnie Yen as Chen Zhen. Yen has become synonymous with his role in other regions outside of Hong Kong with significant Chinese populations.
- Chen Zhen (陳真後傳), a 2001 Chinese television series that tells the story of Chen Zhen after Huo Yuanjia's death. Bruce Leung portrayed Chen Zhen. The supporting cast includes He Qing, Ding Haifeng, Chen Baoguo, Shen Junyi, and Jin Qiaoqiao.
- Huo Yuanjia (霍元甲), a 2001 Chinese television series loosely based on Huo Yuanjia's life, with Chen Zhen's story as a subplot. Vincent Zhao and Wu Yue portrayed Huo Yuanjia and Chen Zhen respectively.
- Jingwu Yingxiong Chen Zhen (精武英雄陳真), a 2001 sequel to Huo Yuanjia (2001). Wu Yue reprised his role as Chen Zhen.
- Huo Yuanjia (霍元甲), a 2008 remake of The Legendary Fok. Ekin Cheng and Jordan Chan portrayed Huo Yuanjia and Chen Zhen respectively. The fight scene in the last episode and the ending are reminiscent of Fist of Fury and the earlier adaptations.
- Legend of the Fist: Chen Zhen (精武陳真), a 2008 sequel to Huo Yuanjia. Jordan Chan reprised his role as Chen Zhen.

== See also ==
- Cheng Chao-an, a character portrayed by Bruce Lee in The Big Boss (1971)
