= Legend of the Fist: Chen Zhen =

2008 Chinese television series

- DVD cover art
- 精武陈真
- Genre: Martial arts
- Screenplay by: Wang Gong
- Directed by: Choi Jing-shing
- Creative director: Stanley Kwan
- Presented by: Sheng Xiaodong; Wang Dafang; Xu Tianfu
- Starring: Jordan Chan; Dong Jie; Terence Yin; Chu Yinan; Norman Chui; Liu Zihao; Tang Yifei; Bryan Leung; Tony Liu; Wang Feihong; Liu Jiaoxin
- Opening theme: "Big Name of China" (大号是中华) by Tsui Siu-ming
- Ending theme: "Song of Departure" (离歌) by Shin
- Country of origin: China
- Original language: Mandarin
- No. of episodes: 30

Production
- Executive producers: Yu Pei; Wang Zhizhong
- Producers: Guo Jun; Jin Shuli; Deng Liwei
- Production location: China
- Running time: 45 minutes per episode

Original release
- Network: TVB

Related
- Huo Yuanjia (2008)

Legend of the Fist: Chen Zhen (精武陈真) is a Chinese television series about Chen Zhen, a fictional apprentice of the Chinese martial artist Huo Yuanjia. The series is a sequel to the 2008 television series Huo Yuanjia, with Jordan Chan reprising his role as Chen Zhen.

== Synopsis ==
The series is set in early 20th-century China. Chen Zhen, who was apparently killed after avenging Huo Yuanjia in Shanghai, has actually survived and moved to Beiping with Huo's orphaned son, Huo Dongjue. He has adopted a new identity and now works as a servant in a martial arts school run by the Fang family. Having dedicated himself to raising Huo Dongjue, he maintains a low profile to stay out of trouble and avoid being recognised. Meanwhile, he starts a romantic relationship with Fang Zhixin, one of the Fang siblings, and gets drawn into a rivalry between the Fang family and a Japanese dojo. Although he is reluctant to get involved in the conflict, he still helps the Fang family drive away the dojo's fighters on a few occasions while in disguise as a masked man dressed in black. His true identity is ultimately revealed and he is forced to go into hiding.

Initially, Chen Zhen only cares about raising Huo Dongjue and reviving the Jingwu School, Huo Yuanjia's legacy. However, over time, he begins to understand that he has a better purpose in life — to defend China from foreign intrusion, especially by the Japanese. He participates in missions to disrupt the Japanese's plans for invasion until the outbreak of the Second Sino-Japanese War. On the night before the Japanese invade Beiping, Chen Zhen rallies his allies to destroy the Japanese spy network's base in the dojo. He sacrifices himself in the battle and becomes a martyr.

== Cast ==
- Jordan Chan as Chen Zhen
- Dong Jie as Fang Zhixin
- Terence Yin as Yagyū Shizukumo (Liusheng Jingyun)
- Chu Yinan as Xu Yanru
- Liu Zihao as Fang Zhiwei
- Tang Yifei as Chiyo (Qiandai)
- Norman Chui as Satō Kashirakawa (Zuoteng Bachuan)
- Bryan Leung as Huangfu Yizhen
- Tony Liu as Xu Yannong
- Sun Yan as Fang Zhixiong
- Wang Feihong as Lu Da'an
- Liu Jiaoxin as Police Chief Jin
- Guo Shengran as Huo Dongjue
- Li Xiaoyan as Fang siblings' mother
- Alan Ng as Yamamoto Hiro (Shanben Hong)
- Jin Peng as Asami Sawa (Qianjian Ze)
- Fang Ye as Zhang He
