= Mizong =

Mizong may refer to:

- Tangmi (唐密), also known as Mìzōng (密宗), Chinese traditions of esoteric Buddhism
- Mízōngyì (迷蹤藝), a Chinese martial art
