= Iron Bodyguard =

1973 Hong Kong film by Chang Cheh and Pao Hsueh-li

- Film poster
- Directed by: Chang Cheh; Pao Hsueh-li
- Written by: Ni Kuang
- Produced by: Run Run Shaw
- Starring: Chen Kuan-tai
- Cinematography: Yuan Ting-bang
- Edited by: Kuo Ting-hung
- Music by: Chen Yung-yu
- Production company: Shaw Brothers
- Distributed by: Shaw Brothers
- Release date: 8 December 1973
- Running time: 94 minutes
- Country: Hong Kong
- Language: Mandarin

Iron Bodyguard (Chinese: 大刀王五) is a 1973 Mandarin-language Hong Kong historical martial arts film directed by Chang Cheh and Pao Hsueh-li. The main character, Chinese hero Wang Wu, has been the subject of multiple films and television series.

== Plot ==
The poet Tan Sitong, son of the governor of Hubei, is impressed when Wang Wu steps in to stop two battalion commanders from arresting the associates of a confessed pickpocket. He follows and befriends Wang Wu by helping him fight off a group of attackers. Tan Sitong and three others are appointed to the cabinet and decree a list of reforms, but Empress Dowager Cixi is against the reforms and charges Kang Youwei, head of the Ministry of Works, with subversion against the nation. Tan Sitong helps Kang Youwei escape while Wang Wu helps Liang Qichao escape. Cixi issues an imperial edict for the ministers of the Privy Council Zhang Yinhuan, Xu Jingcheng, Yang Shenxiu, Yang Rui, Tan Sitong, and Liu Guangdi to be removed from office and prosecuted.

Commanders Pei Feng and Wen Ping lead an army that captures several of the wanted men and sends them to the main prison. Wang Wu plans to rescue the prisoners as they are being led to the execution grounds, so he asks for Wen Ping's help. Wen Ping betrays him and tells the others of the plan, so when Wang Wu and his friends attack, they are defeated by Wen Ping's riflemen and Wang Wu flees injured. Tan Sitong and the other prisoners are beheaded and Wang Wu blames himself. Wang Wu defeats Wen Ping and Yen Feng using martial arts and allows them to leave, but Yen Feng is accidentally fired upon and killed by General Chong's riflemen who are awaiting Wang Wu's exit. Wang Wu is then shot and killed by the riflemen as he exits.

== Cast ==
- Chen Kuan-tai as Wang Wu
- Yueh Hua as Tan Sitong
- Lily Li as Tan Chiao
- Betty Pei Ti as "Camomile" Chin Chu-hua
- Danny Lee as Hu Chi
- Lu Ti as "Iron Fist" Yen Feng
- Tung Lin as General Chong
- Chiang Tao as Commander Pei Feng
- Chiang Nan as Commander Wen Ping
- Ku Weng-chung as Kang Youwei
- Dean Shek Tin as Liang Qichao

== Production ==
Filming took place in Hong Kong. The martial arts choreographers were Tong Kai and Lau Kar-leung. Directors Chang Cheh and Pao Hsueh-li and star Chen Kuan-tai had previously worked together on the successful films The Boxer from Shantung (1972) and Man of Iron (1972), both Shaw Brothers productions.

== Reception ==
Reviewer Andrew Saroch of fareastfilms.com called the film "A polished slice of entertainment from the Shaw Brothers’ vast back catalogue of quality."

Reviewer Will of silveremulsion.com gave the film a rating of 3 out of 4 stars, writing, "Iron Bodyguard has all the pieces in place for a stellar martial arts drama like The Blood Brothers or The Boxer from Shantung, but instead we get a somewhat disjointed, start/stop flow that hinders much of any momentum that the film should contain. [...] In spite of the problems, Iron Bodyguard is still an entertaining and interesting slice of Chinese history in martial arts drama form. There are definitely worse ways to learn history!"

Reviewer Venoms5 of coolasscinema.com wrote, "Prior to seeing this movie, I was never a big fan of Yueh Hua. I really came to appreciate him after seeing his arrogantly righteous portrayal of Tan. Chen Kuan Tai is as good as he ever was here as Wang Wu. There are some truly captivating fight scenes here."

A review by Matt L. Reifschneider on shawbrothersunivers.com reads, "Based on real events from Chinese history known as The Hundred Days' Reform, the film presents itself as a character study of Chen Kuan-Tai’s heroic character Wang Wu within a larger historically set epic and not as the action spectacle that one normally associates with the Shaw Brothers studio. The film often plays against expectation of the usual formula and, for better or worse, toys with the structure in presenting its story. Love it or hate it, Iron Bodyguard does not play things safe and instead goes for dramatic effect over the normally enthusiastic action entertainment. The intent is ambitious, certainly, and Iron Bodyguard has to take its time establishing its pieces before setting them in motion."

== Remake ==
Sammo Hung's 1993 film Blade of Fury is considered by many critics to essentially be a remake of Iron Bodyguard.
