= Legend of a Fighter =

1982 Hong Kong martial arts film

- Theatrical release poster
- 霍元甲
- Directed by: Yuen Woo-ping
- Written by: Ng See-yuen; Leung Lap-yan; Wong Jing
- Produced by: Ng See-yuen
- Starring: Bryan Leung; Yasuaki Kurata; Yuen Yat-choh; Philip Ko; Yuen Cheung-yan; Brandy Yuen; Steve Lee
- Cinematography: Ma Koon-wah
- Music by: Stanley Chow
- Production company: Seasonal Film Corporation
- Release date: 12 February 1982
- Running time: 89 minutes
- Country: Hong Kong
- Language: Cantonese
- Box office: HK$1,875,117

Legend of a Fighter (霍元甲) is a 1982 Hong Kong martial arts film directed by Yuen Woo-ping, and produced by Ng See-yuen, who also wrote the screenplay with Leung Lap-yan and Wong Jing. The film starred Bryan Leung, Yasuaki Kurata, Yuen Yat-choh, Philip Ko, Yuen Cheung-yan, Brandy Yuen, and Steve Lee. The film is loosely based on the life of the Chinese martial artist Huo Yuanjia.

== Synopsis ==
Huo Yuanjia was born susceptible to illness, suffering from asthma and jaundice as a child. His father, Huo Endi, discouraged him from following in their family's tradition of practising martial arts, and hired a Japanese tutor, Yamaguchi Ejūrō, to teach him scholarly arts and moral values. Unknown to his father, Huo Yuanjia secretly learns mizongyi, the Huo family's style of martial arts.

After growing up, Huo Yuanjia becomes an accomplished martial artist and defeats a Japanese fighter, Sanaka, in a match. Sanaka commits suicide following his defeat, prompting the Japanese to send another top fighter to China to challenge Huo Yuanjia. The top fighter turns out to be Yamaguchi, who had secretly learned mizongyi during his time with the Huo family. Huo Yuanjia confronts and defeats Yamaguchi.

== Cast ==
- Bryan Leung as older Huo Yuanjia
  - Yuen Yat-Choh as younger Huo Yuanjia
- Yasuaki Kurata as Chiang Ho Shan/Yamaguchi Ejūrō
- Philip Ko as Huo Endi
- Yuen Cheung-yan as a pipe smoker
- Brandy Yuen as Bucktooth
- Steve Lee as Sanaka
- Lau Hok-nin as Huo's assistant
- Charlie Chan as an Eagle Claw school representative
- Fong Yau as Sanaka's father
- Huang Ha as a master defeated by Sanaka
- Fung Fung as a boxing promoter
- Fung Hak-on as Bow Tie
- San Kuai as Shantung Yellow Tiger
- Lee Fat-yuen as a Japanese swordsman
