= Deadly Secret =

1989 Hong Kong TV series

- VCD cover art
- 連城訣
- Genre: Wuxia
- Based on: A Deadly Secret by Jin Yong
- Screenplay by: Yu Hon-wing; Yeung Wing-cheung; Chung Tak-wing; Yuen Siu-na; Sharon Au
- Directed by: Yau Ka-hung; Lai Kin-kwok; Cheng Siu-Keung; Kiu Lak-hang; Lau Kwok-ho
- Starring: Roger Kwok; Kitty Lai; Shallin Tse
- Opening theme: "Cherish This Moment" (珍惜這一刻) by David Lui and Sammi Cheng
- Ending theme: "Chrysanthemum Tears" (菊花淚) by David Lui and Sammi Cheng
- Composer: Michael Lai
- Country of origin: Hong Kong
- Original language: Cantonese
- No. of episodes: 20

Production
- Producer: Yau Ka-hung
- Production location: Hong Kong
- Running time: ≈45 minutes per episode
- Production company: TVB

Original release
- Network: TVB Jade
- Release: 12 June – 7 July 1989

Deadly Secret (連城訣) is a Hong Kong wuxia television series adapted from the novel A Deadly Secret by Jin Yong. The series was first broadcast on TVB in Hong Kong in 1989.

== Cast ==
- Roger Kwok as Di Yun
- Kitty Lai as Qi Fang
- Shallin Tse as Shui Sheng
- Francis Ng as Wen Gui
- Andy Tai as Wang Xiaofeng
- Kenneth Tsang as Ding Dian
- Maggie Chan as Ling Shuanghua
- Kwan Hoi-san as Ling Tuisi
- Kwan Ching as Qi Zhangfa
- Yip Tin-hang as Yan Daping
- Choi Wan as Wan Zhenshan
- Jim Ping-hei as Wu Kan
- Newton Lai as Shui Dai
- Kwok Fung as Hua Tiegan
- So Hon-sang as Liu Chengfeng
- Ma Hing-sang as Lu Tianshu
- Chu Tit-wo as Xuedao Laozu
- Lee Hoi-sang as Baoxiang
- Eddy Ko as Mei Niansheng
- Mak Tin-yan as Taoist Mu
- Cheng Yin-fung as Juyou
- Chan On-ying as Cuilian
- Sheung-koon Yuk as Ling Tuisi's wife
- Wilson Tsui as Zhong
- Chan Tik-hak as Yu Qianli
- Chan Yau-hau as Xuedao Laomo

== See also ==
- A Deadly Secret
- Lian Cheng Jue
