= Huo Yuanjia (2008 TV series) =

2008 Chinese television series

- DVD cover art
- Also known as: The Legendary Fok 2008
- 霍元甲
- Genre: Martial arts, historical
- Written by: Chan Kiu-ying
- Directed by: Kuk Kwok-leung
- Creative director: Stanley Kwan
- Presented by: Sheng Xiaodong; Ren Xiaojie; Wang Dafang
- Starring: Ekin Cheng; Jordan Chan; Bryan Leung; Zhou Muyin; Ding Li; Qu Yue
- Opening theme: "The Great Wall Never Falls" (万里长城永不倒) by Johnny Yip
- Ending theme: "Night Martyr" (夜殇) by Mao Ning and Chen Ming
- Composer: Chris Babida
- Country of origin: China
- Original language: Mandarin
- No. of episodes: 42

Production
- Executive producer: Wu Jieqiang
- Producers: Guo Jun; Li Cheng; Wang Zhizhong
- Production location: China
- Running time: 45 minutes per episode
- Production companies: Tianjin Jinyuan Film; Huaxia Shiting Huanqiu Media; Dongyang Huanyu Film Culture Media; Beijing Ji'an Yongjia Film Culture Media

Original release
- Network: ATV

Related
- Legend of the Fist: Chen Zhen (2008)

Huo Yuanjia (霍元甲) is a 2008 Chinese television series loosely based on the life of the Chinese martial artist Huo Yuanjia. It includes a subplot about Chen Zhen, a fictional apprentice of Huo Yuanjia and the protagonist of the 1972 film Fist of Fury. The series was directed by Kuk Kwok-leung and starred Ekin Cheng, Jordan Chan, Zhou Muyin, Bryan Leung, Ding Li, and Qu Yue in the lead roles. It was first released in 2008 and was later broadcast on various television channels in other countries in the following year. The sequel, Legend of the Fist: Chen Zhen, was released in late 2008.

== Synopsis ==
Huo Yuanjia was born in Jinghai in a family of martial artists. As he was asthmatic in his childhood, his father Huo Endi strongly discouraged him from practising martial arts. However, he secretly learnt martial arts from "Great Sword" Wang Wu, a swordsman who once saved him from drowning.

Huo Endi and his junior, Zhao Shengxian, were trained in mizongyi by the same master, but they became rivals after their master's death. Despite the animosity between their fathers, Huo Yuanjia develops a close friendship with Zhao Shengxian's daughter, Zhao Qiannan.

One day, Huo Endi and Zhao Shengxian's senior, Cheng Tianxiao, shows up and challenges them to a fight to decide who is the true heir to their master's mizongyi legacy. Huo Yuanjia surprises everyone by displaying his prowess in martial arts for the first time when he blocks Cheng Tianxiao from striking his father. After Huo Yuanji defeats Cheng Tianxiao in a match later, the latter dies in humiliation.

Cheng Tianxiao's apprentice, Chen Zhen, sees Huo Yuanjia as a sworn enemy and vows to avenge his master. However, Huo Yuanjia accepts Chen Zhen as his apprentice in the hope of resolving their feud. Chen Zhen initially holds a grudge against Huo Yuanjia and seeks to kill him, but ultimately dismisses the idea as he becomes more impressed with his new master's sense of righteousness.

One day, Zhao Qiannan's cousin, Long Haisheng, comes to Jinghai on a business trip. It turns out that he is selling opium on the black market in Jinghai. However, Huo Yuanjia foils his plan and destroys the opium in public. Long Haisheng later takes revenge against Huo Yuanjia by framing him for murder, forcing him to flee Jinghai.

Along with Chen Zhen and Liu Zhensheng, Huo Yuanjia travels to Tianjin, where he gets involved in the affairs of the local martial artists' community. He makes his name by defeating a Japanese fighter in a match and emerging victorious in subsequent matches against foreign challengers. Huo Yuanjia then moves to Shanghai, where he establishes the Jingwu School to train martial artists to defend China from foreign intrusion.

In the meantime, Huo Yuanjia becomes the target of a Japanese spy, Wang Xiwen, who joins forces with Long Haisheng to get rid of Huo Yuanjia. In the meantime, Chen Zhen starts a romantic relationship with Wang Xiwen's subordinate, Wang Xiuzhi, without knowing her true identity.

After entering an international martial arts tournament held in Shanghai, Huo Yuanjia defeats all his opponents until he meets Itō, a Japanese karateka. During the match, he suddenly feels weak because he has been secretly poisoned by Wang Xiwen's men. However, he manages to hold his ground and ultimately defeats Itō before he dies from poisoning.

Chen Zhen continues Huo Yuanjia's legacy by keeping the Jingwu spirit alive. Seeking to avenge his master, he confronts Long Haisheng and Wang Xiwen and eventually kills them. In the final scene, he charges with a flying kick towards a line of armed soldiers firing at him.

== Cast ==
- Ekin Cheng as Huo Yuanjia, the founder of Jingwu School.
- Jordan Chan as Chen Zhen, Huo Yuanjia's apprentice.
- Zhou Muyin as Zhao Qiannan, Zhao Shengxian's daughter and Huo Yuanjia's love interest.
- Bryan Leung as Huo Endi, Huo Yuanjia's father.
- Xiu Qing as Long Haisheng, Zhao Qiannan's cousin and the primary antagonist in the series.
- Ding Li as Wang Yun, Huo Yuanjia's wife.
- Qu Yue as Wang Xiuzhi / Hideko, Wang Xiwen's subordinate and Chen Zhen's love interest.
- Hou Yu as Liu Zhensheng, Huo Yuanjia's friend who later becomes his apprentice.
- Zhang Songwen as Nong Jinsun, a Tongmenghui member who co-founds Jingwu School with Huo Yuanjia.
- Lau Kar-wing as Zhao Shengxian, Huo Endi's junior who became his rival.
- Yuen Shun-yee as Cheng Tianxiao, Huo Endi and Zhao Shengxian's senior and Chen Zhen's first master.
- Ben Ng as "Great Sword" Wang Wu, a swordsman who first taught Huo Yuanjia martial arts.
- Ge Lei as Huo Yuanjia's mother
- Simon Chui as Huo Huaishan, Huo Yuanjia's uncle.
- Marco Li as Huo Yuanwu, Huo Yuanjia's brother.
- Chen Kai as Huo Yuanying, Huo Yuanjia's brother.
- Liu Weihua as Wang Xiwen / Mitsui, a Japanese spy.
- He Jinling as Itō, Miyamoto's junior and Huo Yuanjia's final opponent.
- Yan Hongzhi as Miyamoto, a Japanese martial artist defeated by Huo Yuanjia in Tianjin.
- Ye Yong as Zhao Zhennan, Zhao Shengxian's son.
- Zhang Dalei as Zhao Zhenbei, Zhao Shengxian's son.
- Li Zhenqi as Liu Yao, the boss of an armed escort agency and a close friend of Huo Endi and Zhao Shengxian.
- Li Qingxiang as Long Shaoji, Long Haisheng's father and a diplomat.
- Wang Feihong as Lu Da'an, Huo Yuanjia's apprentice.
- Wang Xi as Xiaomei, Zhao Qiannan's servant.
