= Blade of Fury =

1993 Chinese-Hong Kong film by Sammo Hung

- Film poster
- Directed by: Sammo Hung
- Written by: Cheung Tan; Szeto Cheuk-hon
- Produced by: Lo Wei
- Starring: Yang Fan; Cynthia Khan; Rosamund Kwan; Ti Lung; Zhao Changjun
- Cinematography: Raymond Lam
- Edited by: Yu Chun; Peter Cheung
- Music by: Lowell Lo
- Production companies: Changchun Film Studio; China Film Co-Production Corporation; Grand March Movie Production Company Ltd.
- Distributed by: Golden Harvest Company
- Release date: 15 July 1993
- Running time: 105 minutes
- Countries: China; Hong Kong
- Languages: Cantonese; Mandarin
- Box office: HK $1,978,172

Blade of Fury (Chinese: 一刀傾城; pinyin: Yīdāo qīngchéng; lit. 'One Blade to Conquer the City'), also known as China's First Swordsman (Chinese: 神州第一刀; pinyin: Shénzhōu dì yī dāo; lit. 'The First Blade in China'), is a 1993 historical martial arts drama film directed by Sammo Hung. A Chinese-Hong Kong co-production, the film was released theatrically on 15 July 1993. The main character, Chinese hero Wang Wu, has been the subject of multiple films and television series. Many critics consider Blade of Fury to essentially be a remake of Iron Bodyguard.

== Plot ==
In 1895, China ceded Taiwan to Japan but the patriotic Black Flag group in Taiwan nevertheless attempted to fight off the Japanese. After their defeat, their leader "Big Blade" Wang Wu goes into hiding. In 1899, reformers Master Tan Szu-tung and his sidekick Nine Catties are journeying through northeast China to Peking in an attempt to convince the Emperor to enact sweeping reforms when they are caught up in a battle between bandits and Imperial guardsmen led by an ambitious captain named Yuan Shi-kai. They are aided by a powerful blacksmith bearing a Black Flag tattoo, whom they follow and learn is Wang Wu. With their encouragement, Wang Wu opens a martial arts school in the town. Yuan Shi-kai gives Wang Wu a broadsword as a gift.

Wang Wu assists a noblewoman when she is having trouble with her boat and in return she gives him a red umbrella as a gift when they arrive at Lord Yee's palace. There, Wang Wu participates in a martial arts tournament held by Lord Yee, defeating Master Po Ting's son and then Master Po Ting himself. Po Ting's student Siu-Chuen later visits Wang Wu and asks him to train him, as do many other youths. Yuan Shi-kai tells Lord Yee that they should recruit Wang Wu themselves. Lord Yee gives a long sword to Yuan Shi-kai as a gift. Lord Yee invites the Japanese martial arts champion Kenja and Wang Wu to open a Sino-Japanese martial arts club for him. Wang Wu refuses to work with the Japanese champion and is replaced by Po Ting. Kenja challenges Wang Wu at his school, causing Wang Wu to be arrested by Lord Yee for disobeying his orders and fighting with the Japanese.

The noblewoman prevents two men from taking Wang Wu away, then Tan Szu-tung and Nine Catties rescue Wang Wu from the prison. Lord Yee's kung-fu instructor "Wonder Hand" Ngo Pai kills one of Wang Wu's students and steals their papers from their school. Wang Wu and Tan Szu-tung ask for Yuan Shi-kai to provide his men to help defeat the Empress Dowager and enable the Emperor to regain his power, but Yuan Shi-kai has Tan Szu-tung arrested as a traitor. Wang Wu battles and defeats the fierce prison guard Yu Man-san, but Tan Szu-tung refuses to be rescued, preferring to die a martyr. Wang Wu borrows a sword from Yu Man-san and, posing as one of Lord Yee's men, performs the beheading of Tan Szu-tung in a public ceremony.

Wang Wu confronts Yuan Shi-kai. Nine Catties, Siu-chuen and Wang Wu's apprentice from the smithy Chung Sang arrive to help Wang Wu, but Ngo Pai and Po Ting come to the aid of Yuan Shi-kai. Siu-chuen is killed in the fight and Wang Wu kills Ngo Pai. Wang Wu tells Chung Sang to escape so that the spirit of the reformers may live on. Nine Catties is killed by an explosion during the battle between Wang Wu and Yuan Shi-kai. Lord Yee's soldiers then arrive and kill Wang Wu. Chung Sang, still alive, witnesses this from the roof of a building. The film ends with the noblewoman leaving a red umbrella at Wang Wu's grave.

== Cast ==
- Yang Fan as Wang Wu
- Cynthia Khan as Nine Catties
- Rosamund Kwan as Noblewoman
- Ti Lung as Tan Szu-tung
- Zhao Changjun
- Chen Guowei
- Ngai Sing as Siu-chuen
- Sammo Hung as Yu Man-san
- Lau Shun as Ngo Pai
- James Tien as Bandit Leader
- Chiu Cheung-Gwan as Yuan Shi-kai
- Wang Zhentian
- Wong Kam-kong as Lord Yee
- Yip Wing-cho as Nobleman
- Yu Yankai as Po Ting

== Reception ==
Reviewer Kozo of lovehkfilm.com called Blade of Fury "an enjoyable, though somewhat messy martial arts film mixing political intrigue, questionable performances, and balls-to-the-wall martial arts choreography", concluding, "for martial arts junkies who enjoy the fast-and-dirty Hong Kong action of the nineties and not the over-choreographed ballet battles of the new millenium, Blade of Fury should easily satisfy."

Reviewer Rick of darksidereviews.com gave the film a rating of 8/10, writing, "Blade of Fury is without a doubt Sammo Hung's last great achievement. [...] Torn between a dark plot and strong characters, and sometimes surreal accelerated battles, Blade of Fury remains a great film."

Reviewer Ben Johnson of kungfumovieguide.com gave the film 3 out of 5 stars, calling it "blistering historical action" and concluding, "Slightly confused and silly in places, the film’s exuberance is nevertheless astonishing."

Reviewer Perkele of cityonfire.com gave the film a rating of 6/10, writing, "Too many sequences are spoiled with too many wire tricks, but they're still entertaining."

Reviewer Andrew Pragasam of The Spinning Image gave the film 7 out of 10 stars, concluding that the film "shows Sammo the director could handle gut-wrenching drama as well as he could stage an exciting action sequence."

Reviewer David J. Moore of The Action Elite gave the film 3 out of 5 stars, writing, "Blade of Fury is a gonzo cavalcade of Golden Harvest action. With its ultra violent prologue and snappy kung fu interludes that speckle the rest of the film, the movie entertains and engages, despite having a predictably melodramatic tragic ending."

Reviewer Janick Neveu of Kung Fu Cult Cinema gave the film a rating of 66/100, calling it "an epic swordplay movie" that "has some great moments that really makes it worth the viewing for any kung fu/swordplay fans."

Reviewer Carsten Henkelmann of senseofview.de gave the film a positive review, writing, "Blade of Fury is pure Hong Kong cinema. [...] Those who like films such as Chinese Ghost Story, Iron Monkey, or China Swordsman will love this film."

Reviewer bozpictures of Asian Film Strike gave the film a negative review of 1½ out of 5 stars, concluding, "Too overblown and simplistic to succeed as a political drama, too scattershot to even engage the viewer, and with incongruous fights that border on parody with their excessive trickery, Blade of Fury is a failure with only a good cast to redeem it."

Reviewer Antoine Rigaud of devildead.com wrote, "The story gets lost fairly quickly between many characters divided between the reform and conservative factions."

The website onderhond.com gave the film a rating of 3.5/5.0.
