= Wang Zhengyi =

Chinese martial artist

- Born: 1844; Cangzhou, Hebei
- Died: 1900; Beijing
- Style: Chinese martial arts Liuhe Quan
- Teacher(s): Li Fenggang (李鳳崗)

Other information
- Occupation: Martial artist, Security guard,
- Notable students: Tan Sitong

Wang Zhengyi (Chinese: 王正谊, courtesy name: Zibin / 子斌, Xiao'erjing: وْا ﺟْﻊ ىِ) (1844–1900) was a martial artist during the late Qing dynasty, hailing from Cangzhou, Hebei. He was of Hui Muslim ethnicity. Being the fifth by seniority of his master's students, Wang came to be called Wang Wu (Chinese: 王五; i.e. Wang the fifth). His use of the dadao (Chinese greatsword) would lead to him earning the sobriquet by which he is best known, Dadao Wang Wu (Chinese: 大刀王五; sometimes rendered in English as Broadsword Wang Wu or Great Sword Wang Wu). Liang Qichao also called him the Hero of Yānzhào from the traditional name for Hebei.

== Life ==
In the fifth year of the Guangxu Emperor's reign (1879), Wang opened the Shunyuan Protection Agency just outside Beijing's Zhengyangmen. The agency was a secure courier business which served a broad area, from Shanhai Pass in the north to Huai'an (Jiangsu) in the south. Wang Wu was chivalrous in nature and became friends with members of the reform movement, including a young Tan Sitong to whom he taught martial arts. In 1898 with the failure of the Hundred Days' Reform, Wang and Tan Sitong attempted to rescue the imprisoned Guangxu Emperor, but failed. Following Tan Sitong's execution, Wang recovered Tan's body for burial.

In some folklore accounts, which have become the basis of subsequent films and dramas, Wang storms the execution ground in an attempted rescue but Tan Sitong refuses to leave, saying that in the past reform in China has failed because no one was willing to make the necessary sacrifices, and that if a sacrifice of blood be needed then it should begin with his own.

== Death ==
Wang Wu died in 1900 from bullet wounds sustained whilst fighting the Eight-Nation Alliance during the Boxer Rebellion, his corpse was beheaded and the head hung up for display, his remains were stolen away by Huo Yuanjia for burial.

== Cultural references ==
Film

- 1950: The Bloody Fight Between Big Blade Wong Fifth and the Invincible Kid at the Hong Kong Movie DataBase
- 1951: Big Sword Wang Wu's Revenge at the Hong Kong Movie DataBase
- 1973: The Iron Body guard at the Hong Kong Movie DataBase
- 1985: Kung Fu Hero Wang Wu at the Hong Kong Movie DataBase
- 1993: Blade of Fury

Television

- 1971: Dadao Wang Wu (Taiwan Television drama)
- 1976: The Legend of the Heroic Knights-Dadao Wang Wu (TVB drama)
- 1976: Top Ten Assassins-Dadao Wang Wu (Rediffusion Television drama)
- 1999: Ten Tigers Of Guangdong (Asia Television drama series)
- 2002: Huo Yuanjia (2001 TV series)
- 2003: Find the Light (TVB drama series)
- 2008: Huo Yuanjia (2008 TV series)
- 2020: Heroes (martial arts TV series)

Fiction

- 1991 Beijing Fayuán Temple (北京法源寺)
