= Find the Light =

- Promo poster
- 英雄‧刀‧少年
- Genre: Ancient, Wuxia
- Starring: Ron Ng; Bosco Wong; Damian Lau; Maggie Shiu; Shirley Yeung; Tavia Yeung
- Opening theme: "肝膽相照" by Frances Yip
- Country of origin: Hong Kong
- Original language: Cantonese
- No. of episodes: 20

Production
- Producer: Wong Wai Sing (黃偉聲)
- Running time: 45 minutes (approx.)

Original release
- Network: TVB
- Release: September 8 – October 3, 2003

Find the Light ((Chinese: 英雄·刀·少年) literally Hero-Sword-Youth) is a 2003 TVB historical costume drama, set in the Qing dynasty. Consisting of 20 episodes, it was broadcast from September 8, 2003, to October 3, 2003, in the prime 8:00 to 9:00 pm weekday slot. The theme song was sung by Frances Yip.

The series uses dramatic irony in its telling, the two main protagonists being based on historical figures.

== Plot ==
Following its humiliation in the First and Second Opium Wars Qing China attempts to modernise its military, part of this modernisation being the belated creation of a modern military academy. Despite secretly being a revolutionary Chan Do Yeung (Damian Lau) is chosen to be principal of the academy and agrees, on the proviso that he be allowed to admit Han students.

Among the first intake of students are a scion of a noble family Tam Chi Tung (Bosco Wong) and a commoner Wong Ng (Ron Ng), despite their differences the two become bosom friends. Also amongst the students is Cheuk Lan (Shirley Yeung), a princess belonging to a cadet branch of the ruling family. Cheuk Lan's father is Sok Yi Suen (Lau Kong) with ultimate responsibility for the academy, believing that the Empire is a Manchu one, he orders his followers in the academy to make things as hard as possible for the Han students with the aim of failing them. Chan Do Yeung however takes an interest in Wong, who is the son of a deceased friend, and accepts him as a formal disciple, he stumbles though with Wong's training, for although possessing great strength Wong finds it impossible to use his strength in combat.

Initially at odds with one another Wong and Cheuk Lan fall in love, however he is unable to graduate from the academy, and instead becomes a caravan guard.

Chan Do Yeung's secret is discovered, although willing to serve the sinicized Manchu to defend China against a common enemy, the Manchu have him ambushed and killed. Finally having found a weapon to suit his great strength, the dadao, Wong Ng arrives to late too save his master but is able to avenge him.

== Cast ==
Cast	Role	Description
Ron Ng	Wong Ng 王五	Wong Yuen Sum Yi's son Tam Chi Tung's best friend Chan Do Yueng's apprentice
Bosco Wong	Tam Chi Tung 譚嗣同	Son of Tam Kai Suen; Wong Ng's best friend
Damian Lau	Chan Do Yeung 陳道揚	Wong Ng's master
Maggie Shiu	Wong Yuen Sum Yi 王阮心怡	Wong Ng's mother
Shirley Yeung	Princess Cheuk Lan 卓蘭格格	Daughter of Sok Yi Suen(Lau Kong)
Tavia Yeung	Li Kwai 李閏	Tam Chi Tung's wife
