= Huo Yuanjia (2001 TV series) =

2001 Chinese television series

- VCD cover art
- Also known as: The Legend of Huo Yuanjia
- 霍元甲
- Genre: Historical, martial arts
- Directed by: Jia Yun
- Starring: Vincent Zhao; Mei Ting; Wu Yue; Qi Yan; He Yin
- Opening theme: "The Great Wall Never Falls" (万里长城永不倒)
- Ending theme: "Forget All Feelings in One's Heart" (忘尽心中情)
- Country of origin: China
- Original language: Mandarin
- No. of episodes: 34

Production
- Executive producers: Tang Yong; Qi Xiaohong; Zhu Yonglei; Huang Xingzai
- Producer: Jia Yun
- Production location: China
- Running time: 45 minutes per episode
- Production company: Pikawang Film Company

Related
- Jingwu Yingxiong Chen Zhen (2001)

Huo Yuanjia (霍元甲) is a 2001 Chinese television series loosely based on the life of the Chinese martial artist Huo Yuanjia. It includes a subplot about Chen Zhen, a fictional apprentice of Huo Yuanjia and the protagonist of the 1972 film Fist of Fury. The series was directed by Jia Yun and starred Vincent Zhao, Wu Yue, Mei Ting, Qi Yan, and He Yin in the lead roles. A sequel, Jingwu Yingxiong Chen Zhen, was released later in the same year.

== Synopsis ==
During the late Qing dynasty, China suffers humiliating defeats in battles against foreign powers such as Britain and Japan and has been forced to sign unequal treaties and cede territories. In Tianjin, even though Chinese martial artist Huo Endi defeats his Japanese opponent in a lei tai match, his triumph is insignificant as China has just lost to Japan in the First Sino-Japanese War and the Chinese naval fleet had been completely destroyed.

Huo Yuanjia, Huo Endi's son, travels to Beijing to meet his father's friend, "Great Sword" Wang Wu, and unwittingly gets involved in the politics of the Hundred Days' Reform. Wang Wu attempts to rescue the "Six Gentlemen" who lead the reformists after they have been imprisoned on Empress Dowager Cixi's order. Huo Yuanjia joins Wang Wu in his quest but they fail and the six men are publicly executed, while Wang Wu dies a gruesome death later when he tries to avenge them. Through his experiences, Huo Yuanjia realises that China needs to change in order to survive in the future. Later, he meets members of the Tongmenghui, a secret society planning to overthrow the imperial government and establish a republic in China, and supports them in their covert activities.

Huo Yuanjia travels to Shanghai, where he establishes the Jingwu School to train Chinese martial artists to defend China from foreign intrusion and boost national morale. He makes his name after defeating a Russian wrestler in Tianjin and a British boxer in Shanghai. At the same time, he meets the hostile Chen Zhen, who seeks vengeance on him. Chen Zhen's father had died in a fight against Huo Endi years ago and since Huo Endi is already dead, Huo Yuanjia becomes Chen Zhen's target. In an attempt to make peace, Huo Yuanjia accepts Chen Zhen as an apprentice and trains him in martial arts.

Huo Yuanjia's love relationships are in a mess because he is in love with Qiyun and Nong Jingqiu, who stand on opposing sides: Qiyun is the daughter of Prince Rong, a Manchu noble tasked by the imperial government to destroy the Tongmenghui; Nong Jingqiu is the sister of Nong Jinsun, a Tongmenghui member and co-founder of the Jingwu School. Besides that, Huo Yuanjia faces love rivals: Watanabe Ichiro, a Japanese consul, is in love with Qiyun; Zheng Yefeng, Nong Jingqiu's godbrother, has a crush on his godsister.

== Cast ==
- Vincent Zhao as Huo Yuanjia
- Wu Yue as Chen Zhen
- Mei Ting as Nong Jingqiu
- Qi Yan as Princess Qiyun
- Ma Kui as Nong Jinsun
- Huang Huiyi as Zhao Qiannan
- He Yin as Wang Xiang'er
- Feng Jingao as Hu Zishi
- Yue Yueli as Prince Rong
- Su Ke as Zheng Yefeng
- Chen Kai as Liu Zhensheng
- Lu Xingyu as Watanabe Ichiro (Dubian Yilang)
- Feng Peng as Zhou Tiezhu
- Xie Yunshan as Tietou
- Shu Chang as Ju'er
- Qin Jiahua as Ōhashi (Daqiao)
- Li Zhenqi as Wang Wu
- Liu Haijun as Huang Tianba
- Yangzi as Chu Chu
