= Wu Yue (actor) =

Chinese actor

- 吴樾
- Born: 25 April 1976 (age 50); Zhangjiakou, Hebei, China
- Education: Central Academy of Drama
- Occupations: Actor; martial artist; lyricist; singer
- Years active: 1994–present
- Spouse: Liu Jing (m. 2015)
- Children: 1

Chinese name
- Simplified Chinese: 吴樾
- Traditional Chinese: 吳樾
Transcriptions
Standard Mandarin
- Hanyu Pinyin: Wú Yuè
Yue: Cantonese
- Jyutping: Ng4 Jyut6

Wu Yue (born 25 April 1976) is a Chinese film and television series actor. Some of his more notable roles include Chen Zhen in Huo Yuanjia and Jingwu Yingxiong Chen Zhen (2001); Di Yun in Lian Cheng Jue (2004); Sun Wukong in Journey to the West (2011); Ariq Böke in The Legend of Kublai Khan (2013); and Wan Zonghua in Ip Man 4 (2019).

== Biography ==
Wu enrolled in the Central Academy of Drama in 1997 and graduated in 2001. Apart from acting, he practises martial arts and holds a National Martial Arts Championship grade in wushu. He is currently a member of the National Theatre Company of China. He also wrote lyrics and performed songs for some of the films and television series he acted in.

== Family ==
Wu married Liu Jing (刘晶) in 2015, their daughter Wu Dini (吴狄妮) was born in 2016.

== Filmography ==
=== Film ===
Year	Title	Role	Notes
2001	Shushan Zhengzhuan 蜀山正传	Wen Qi	
2003	Cat and Mouse 老鼠爱上猫	Pang Yu	
2005	On the Mountain of Tai Hang 太行山上	Chen Xilian	
2005	Huanjing Linghu 幻境灵狐	Shi Dapu	
2005	Liaozhai Zhiyi Zhi Liansuo 聊斋志异之连琐	Wang Yanke	
2006	Xuejian Sanchakou 血溅三岔口	Liu Lihua	
2006	Nü Shenbu Zhi Miju 女神捕之迷局	Cao Yifeng	
2006	Nü Shenbu Zhi Juejing 女神捕之绝境	Cao Yifeng	
2008	Lei Heng Yu Zhu Tong 雷横与朱仝	Lei Heng	
2008	Panni Xilin 1944 盘尼西林1944	Xiaozheng	
2008	Wushu Ban 武术班	Wu Jie	
2009	Gudao Mimi Zhan 孤岛秘密战	Japanese biologist	
2009	Youxia Hong Mudan 游侠红牡丹	Hongmudan	
2009	Taishan Kung Fu 泰山功夫	Shi Xiaoyi	
2009	Little Big Soldier 大兵小将	Beggar	
2009	Looking for Jackie 寻找成龙	Coach Wu	
2009	Love at Seventh Sight 七天愛上你		
2010	Wushu Ban Zhi Zhongguo Gongfu 武术班之中国功夫	Gao Jian	
2010	Bruce Lee, My Brother 李小龙我的兄弟	Wong Leung	
2012	Qian Xue Sen 钱学森	Zhang Gongnong	
2012	Bottom Line		
2012	You and Me		
2013	A Chilling Cosplay		
2013	Police Story 2013		
2014	Lady in the Portrait		
2015	From Vegas to Macau 2		
2015	An Accidental Shot of Love		
2016	God of War		
2016	Mission Milano	Iron Hawk	
2016	Cold War 2	Wu Tin-man	
2017	Paradox	Chui Kit	
2017	The Brink	Tak	
2018	The Faces of My Gene	Kuafu	
2018	A Better Tomorrow 4		
2018	I Am Your Mom		
2018	Kung Fu Monster		
2019	Song of Youth		
2019	Love Song to the Days Forgone		
2019	Confidant		
2019	Ip Man 4: The Finale	Wan Zonghua	
2019	The Captain		
2023	Sakra	Murong Fu	
2026	Crossing	Long Yun	

=== Television ===
Year	Title	Role	Notes
1994	Jinsheng Shi Qinren 今生是亲人	Gao Zhenbao	
1995	He Lan Xue 贺兰雪	Crown prince	
2001	Qipin Qinchai 七品钦差	Feiying	
2001	Huanggong Baobei 皇宫宝贝	Chen Jinnan	
2001	Tiantian Tianlan 天天天蓝	Xie Yong	
2001	Legendary Fighter - Yang's Heroine 杨门女将	Yang Yande	
2001	Huo Yuanjia 霍元甲	Chen Zhen	
2001	Jingwu Yingxiong Chen Zhen 精武英雄陈真	Chen Zhen	
2002	The Young Wong Fei Hung 少年黄飞鸿	Liang Wei	
2002	Taiji Wang 太极王	Chen Wangting	
2002	Book and Sword, Gratitude and Revenge 书剑恩仇录	Zhao Banshan	
2003	The Price of Glory 刺虎	Lu Huchen	
2003	Benyue 奔月	Taiyang	
2003	The Story of Han Dynasty 楚汉风云	Han Xin	
2004	Lian Cheng Jue 连城诀	Di Yun	
2004	Langzi Yan Qing 浪子燕青	Yan Qing	
2004	Huantian Xidi Qi Xiannü 欢天喜地七仙女	Yu Ri	
2004	Ding Xiang Huakai 丁香花开	Wu Yongtai	
2005	Dixia Jiaotong Zhan 地下交通站	Cai Shuigen	
2005	Zhongji Diefei 终极谍匪	Ma Yuliang	
2005	How Much Sorrow Do You Have 问君能有几多愁	Zhao Guangyi	
2006	Zuixia Zhang San 醉侠张三	Zhang San	
2006	The Legendary Warrior 薛仁贵传奇	Luo Tong	
2006	Young Justice Bao III 少年包青天III之天芒传奇	Yelü Juncai	
2007	Da Hei Zhong'an Zu 打黑重案组	Yao Huang	
2007	Shun Niang 顺娘	Li Fucai	
2007	Jianghu Wangshi 江湖往事	Lei Jingsheng	
2007	Healing Souls 生命有明天	Liu Zhiyong	
2008	Diannao Wawa 电脑娃娃	Yingxiong	
2008	Maming Feng Xiaoxiao 马鸣风萧萧	Sikong Yuan	
2008	Fankang Zhi Zhenxin Yingxiong 反抗之真心英雄	Xia Shijie	
2010	Wudu Liehu 雾都猎狐	Lei Qiming	
2010	Wo Shi Chuanqi 我是传奇	Guan Da'an	
2011	Journey to the West 西游记	Sun Wukong	
2011	Huguo Junhun Chuanqi 护国军魂传奇	Ma Yuwen	
2012	Lian Hua 莲花	Tianhe	
2012	Da Wudang 大武当	Mu Tianliang / Tianyi	
2013	The Legend of Kublai Khan 忽必烈传奇	Ariq Böke	
2019	The King of Land Battle 陆战之王	Yang Junyu	

=== Variety show ===
Year	English title	Chinese title	Role	Notes/Ref.
12 February 2021	China in Classics	典籍里的中国	King Wu of Zhou	
7 August 2021	China in Classics	典籍里的中国	Wu Zixu	

== Theater ==
Title	Role	Notes
Yingxiong 英雄	Xiao Hanyang	

== Discography ==
Title	Composer	Lyrics	Notes
Wo Xiangnian Ni 我想念你	Hu Haiquan	Wu Yue	
Dong Xue 冬雪	Hu Haiquan	Wu Yue	
Dayu 大雨	Meng Zhenghao	Meng Zhenghao	
Yingxiong 英雄	Li Tianhua	Wu Yue	Insert song from Langzi Yan Qing; theme song from Wushu Ban
Gongfu Xiaozi 功夫小子	Li Bin	Li Bin	Theme song from Zuixia Zhang San
Wuke Tidai 无可替代	Li Xianle	Wu Yue, Yoka	
Wu Yue Canghai 武越沧海	Yuanhang	Lu Shiwei	
Bu Kao Pu 不靠谱	Yang Fan	Yang Fan, Wu Yue	
Duo Baozhong 多保重	Xu Jingqing	Che Xing	Insert song from Journey to the West

== Accolades ==
- National Martial Arts Championship, Seventh National Games (1993)
- Champion in bajiquan category, National Wushu Championship (1994)
- Silver Medal (representing Ningxia province), Fifth National Games for Ethnic Minorities (1995)
- First Place in bajiquan category, National Personal Elite Championship (1996)
- Fifth Place in nanquan category, Eighth National Games (1997)
- Five champion titles, Beijing College Wushu Competition (1998 / 1999)
- Audience's Favourite Actor in Action Genre in Ten Years of Film and Television, Ninth Digital Film Lily Awards (2009)
