= Lian Cheng Jue (TV series) =

2004 Chinese TV series

- DVD cover art
- Also known as: A Deadly Secret; Secret of the Linked Cities; Linked Cities; Requiem of Ling Sing
- 连城诀
- Genre: Wuxia
- Based on: A Deadly Secret by Jin Yong
- Directed by: Wang Xinmin; Chen Yongge
- Starring: Wu Yue; Shu Chang; He Meitian
- Opening theme: "We Stand in the Rain" (我们站在雨中) by Han Lei
- Ending theme: "The Horse Doesn't Stop Galloping" (马不停蹄) by Fu Disheng and Ren Jing
- Country of origin: China
- Original language: Mandarin
- No. of episodes: 36

Production
- Production location: China
- Running time: ≈45 minutes per episode

Original release
- Network: NMTV
- Release: 1 July 2004

Lian Cheng Jue (连城诀) is a Chinese wuxia television series adapted from the novel A Deadly Secret by Jin Yong. Starring Wu Yue, Shu Chang and He Meitian, the series was first broadcast on NMTV in China in 2004.

== Cast ==
- Wu Yue as Di Yun
- Shu Chang as Shui Sheng
- He Meitian as Qi Fang
- Wang Haidi as Ding Dian
- Yu Chenghui as Mei Niansheng
- Liu Xiao Ling Tong as Hua Tiegan
- Yu Dongjiang as Qi Changfa
- Du Zhiguo as Wan Zhenshan
- Qian Yongchen as Wan Gui
- Dong Yangyang as Wang Xiaofeng
- Wang Shihuai as Ling Tuisi
- Gao Beibei as Ling Shuanghua
- Ji Chunhua as Xuedao Laozu
- Zhang Li as Yan Daping
- Ba Tu as Xia Sandao
- Wang Limin as Gen Bao
- Yu Nannan as Gen Bao's wife
- Chen Hao as Wu Kan
- Guo Jun as Shui Dai
- Shu Lun as Lu Tianshu
- Meng He as Liu Chengfeng
- Cao Guoxin as Baoxiang
- Sheng Ning as Lu Kun
- Yu Peng as Shen Cheng
- Zhan Xiaodan as Sun Jun
- Anan as Feng Tan
- Feng Yun as Ju You
- Wang Jing as Xiang'er
- Kong Qingsan as Shoulaotou
- Zeng Aiyi as Kongxincai
- Wang Zhe as a jailer
- Zhang Peng as Zhao Yan
- Guo Yanhua as Baisui Laoren
- Wang Kai as Liu Daniang
- Zhao Na as Yuhuansao
- Ma Xiaoning as Dibao
- Wang Changling as Squire Wu
- Bai Haipeng as Young Master Wu
- Zhang Chunfang as Xiaotongzi
- Liu Wei as Lü Tong
- Zhang Chunsheng as Xiaobao
- Liu Chunsheng as Chen Dazhui
- Zhang Jianguo as Woodcutter Zhang
- Cheng Zhen as the black-robed Taoist
- E Zhicheng as Song Laoping
- Su Ke as the Western Shu escort leader
- Yan Ning as a monk

== See also ==
- A Deadly Secret
- Deadly Secret
