= Shu Chang (actress) =

- Born: 1 December 1987 (age 38); Baishan, Jilin, China
- Education: Beijing International Studies University
- Occupations: Actress; singer; television host
- Years active: 1993–present
- Agent(s): Shu Chang Studio (under H&R Century Pictures Co. Ltd)

Chinese name
- Traditional Chinese: 舒暢
- Simplified Chinese: 舒畅
Transcriptions
Standard Mandarin
- Hanyu Pinyin: Shū Chàng
- Musical career
- Website: shu-chang.org

Shu Chang (Chinese: 舒畅, born 1 December 1987) is a Chinese actress, singer, and television host. In the early 2000s, Shu gained considerable fame for her roles as Consort Donggo in Xiaozhuang Mishi (2003); Jin Meili in The Story of a Noble Family (2003); Tianshan Tonglao in Demi-Gods and Semi-Devils (2003); Princess Yun in Huang Taizi Mishi (2004); Shui Sheng in A Deadly Secret (2004); Jingwei in Jingwei Tianhai (2004) and Xiaoyu in Lotus Lantern (2005).

== Biography ==
Despite her busy schedule, Shu has never neglected her studies. She was awarded the "merit award for all-round development" for good students from 1995 to 1999, and also the "Red Scarf Model" and the "Top 10 Outstanding Youths" accolades from the Beijing government. When she was in secondary school, Shu maintained the top student position for three consecutive years.

Shu graduated from Beijing International Studies University.

== Career ==
=== Early beginnings ===
When Shu Chang was still a child, she was discovered by a director in a photo-taking center and invited to guest-star as the younger version of the female protagonist in My Story. Thereafter she has constantly appeared in television series. In 1995, she was awarded the 'Golden Child' award by the State Administration of Press, Publication, Radio, Film and Television. She also appeared in the music video of "Que Ga Fei", a popular children's song that won the Gold award at the Chinese Music Television Festival and won the award of honorary mentions. In 1996, Shu released her first single "On the Way Home".

Shu gained attention for her role in the television series in Single Household (1997). At the age of 10, Shu released her first album Have a love to Home which serves as the soundtrack for Single Household. The album sold 100,000 copies and caused a huge stir in the music industry at that time. Shu also became the host for the children's variety program Dragon Club (1998). From 1995 to 2001, Shu attended various events where she hosted, sang or performed in stage productions. She has also appeared in television series and films throughout this period.

=== Rising popularity ===
Shu rose to fame for her role as the gentle and elegant Consort Donggo in Xiaozhuang Epic (2002), and won the Outstanding Newcomer Award at the China Golden Eagle TV Art Festival.

In 2003, Shu appeared in two popular television series; period romance drama The Story of a Noble Family and wuxia drama Demi-Gods and Semi-Devils. In particular, her role as Tianshan Tonglao left a deep impression on the audience, and led to increased recognition for Shu. Also due to the success of The Story of a Noble Family (the writer was from Fenghuang County, Hunan), Shu, along with other major cast members, were designated as "Honorary Citizens" of Fenghuang County.

In 2004, Shu starred in The Deadly Secret, based on the novel of the same name by Jin Yong. During the filming of the series, Shu was faced with a life-threatening accident and even had to sign an indemnity agreement. She also starred in Huang Taizi Epic; the second installment of the historical series after Xiaozhuang Epic.

In 2005, Shu starred in the fantasy drama Lotus Lantern. The series was the highest rated drama of the year and won the Best Television Series award at the Asian Television Awards. Following its airing, Shu experienced a surge in popularity and was known by wider audiences. The same year, Shu was also cast in the mythological-fantasy drama Jing Wei Zhen Hai, based on the Classic of Mountains and Seas wherein she portrayed Jingwei.

=== Career slump ===
However, in 2006, Shu was involved in a contract dispute lawsuit against the production team of San Di Xue, reaching the nadir of her career. She was accused of being absent from the shooting location for an extended period, and was discovered to be at different locations filming other productions at the same time. Shu responded to the accusation, saying that the other party breached the terms of the contract first and divulged her personal details to the media.

=== Career resurgence and supporting roles ===
Shu bounced back in 2008 with her role in fantasy web series Magic Phone as a technologically challenged woman from the future. The series attained a peak rating of 5.76 for a single episode, and went on to receive the "Most Popular Television Series" award at the Baidu Fudian award ceremony. She also co-starred in Royal Tramp, where she received positive reviews for her portrayal of the sassy and forthright Princess Jianning. Shu received the Breakthrough Actor award at the Tencent Star Awards Ceremony.

She starred in the 2011 television adaptation of Journey to the West, playing Ruler of Women's Kingdom. In 2012, she starred in the second installment of the Yu Zheng's 'Gong' series, playing twin sisters; and received praises for her performance.

In 2013, Shu played the lead in the period political drama Beauties at the Crossfire, which achieved the highest ratings of the year for Anhui TV and won the Most Popular Television Series award at the Shanghai Television Festival.

Since then, Shu played notable supporting roles in the popular television series Legend of Fragrance (2015), Noble Aspirations (2016) and The Glory of Tang Dynasty (2017).

== Filmography ==
=== Film ===
Year	English title	Chinese title	Role	Notes/Ref.
1992		小巷情深		
1995	Dancing Girl	舞女	young Lin Xiaoqian	
2006	Love in Thirty Days	恋爱三十天	Du Lele	

=== Television series ===
Year	English title	Chinese title	Role	Notes/Ref.
1992	Our Story	我的故事	Li Yuanyuan's daughter	
1993	Unfamiliar Seashore	陌生的海岸	Shu Xiaofan	
1996	I Don't Have a Home	我没有家	Bao Yatou	
1996	Single Household	单亲之家	Xiaolajiao	
1997	We Are One Family	我们是一家	Mei Hua	
1997	Little Sun	小太阳		
1997	Live Your Days Happily	好好过日子	Zhou Zhao	
1998		小凤仙的故事	young Xiaofengxian	
1999	A Big House	好大一个家	Female lead's daughter	
2001	Huo Yuanjia	霍元甲	Ju'er	
2001	Travelling a Thousand Miles to See Him	众里寻他千百度	Liu Jie	
2001	Happy Fate	欢乐情缘	Shang Xiaoyun	
2001	Husband and Wife Exchange Blows	夫妻过招	Gao Han	
2002	Palace Darling	皇宫宝贝	Qiaoyue	
2002	New Female Prince Consort	新女驸马	Xing'er	
2002	Xiaozhuang Epic	孝庄秘史	Consort Donggo	
	The Story of a Noble Family	金粉世家	Jin Meili	
	Saving a Young Criminal	拯救少年犯	Kang Wenjing	
	Demi-Gods and Semi-Devils	天龙八部	Tianshan Tonglao	
	Cao Xueqin	曹雪芹	Baoyu	
2004		鸡祥如意	Xing'er / Yue'er	
2004	Li Wei the Magistrate II	李卫当官2	Shi Liu	
2004	A Chef becomes an Official	厨子当官	Bihuan / Yuhuan	
2004	Huang Taizi Mishi	皇太子秘史	Princess Yun	
2004	A Deadly Secret	连城诀	Shui Sheng	
2004	Young Imperial Envoy	少年大钦差	Chen Wenjing (Xu Lian)	
2005		精卫填海	Jingwei	
2005	Lotus Lantern	宝莲灯	Xiaoyu	
2006	Chinese Mother	中国母亲	Huang Lin	
2006	Vino Veritas	酒后吐真言	Sun Huimei	
2006		宫廷画师郎世宁	Youmin	
2006		传奇幻想殷商	Tong Yao	
2006	Love in Future	爱在来时	Zhou Jingyi / Suya	
2007		花开有声	Liu Yue	
2008	No More Rainy Days	雨季不再来	Meng Sijia	
2008	Magic Phone	魔幻手机	Silly girl	
2008	Royal Tramp	鹿鼎记	Princess Jianning	
2008		大明奇才	Cao Zhen	
2008	My Depraved Brother	义本同心	Shang Min	
2008	Variation of Shuangcheng	双城变奏	Tang Yin / Ting Na	
2009		红官窑	Xia Furong	
2010	Sister Jiang	江姐	Wenjuan	
2011	Journey to the West	西游记	Ruler of Women's Kingdom	
2011		血战太行山	Hao Xi'e / Hao Xilan	
2012	Palace II	宫锁珠帘	Concubine Yun / Mudan	
2012	Spring and Autumn Herind of Yancheng	春秋淹城	Luo Fu	
2012	Bounty Hunter	赏金猎人	Mysterious girl	
2013	Beauties at the Crossfire	烽火佳人	Tong Shuwan	
2014	Magic Phone 2	魔幻手机2傻妞归来	Silly Girl	
2015	Legend of Fragrance	活色生香	Xiaoya Huizi	
2016	Esoterica of Qing Dynasty	乾隆秘史	Lin Pinpin	
2016	Noble Aspirations	青云志	Xiao Bai	
2016	Will of Steel	心如铁	Little Apple	
2017	The Glory of Tang Dynasty	大唐荣耀	Murong Lingzhi	
2017	Legend of Dragon Pearl	龙珠传奇之无间道	Xue Qiancheng / Shu Wanxin	
TBA	Peace in Palace, Peace in Chang'an	天下长安	Empress Zhangsun	
TBA	Meet Miss Anxiety	我的早更女友	Qi Jia	
TBA	Past Events of Beijing	北京往事		
TBA	Jin Wu Wei	金吾卫之天魔鬼畜		

== Discography ==
=== Albums ===
Year	English title	Chinese title	Notes
1997	Have a Love to Home	少了妈妈只有半个家	

=== Singles ===
Year	English title	Chinese title	Notes
2004	"The Rain Season Won't Come Again"	雨季不再来	
2012	"Song of Love Sickness"	相思曲	
