= Legend of the Fist: The Return of Chen Zhen =

2010 Hong Kong film by Andrew Lau

- Theatrical poster

Chinese name
- Traditional Chinese: 精武風雲－陳真
- Simplified Chinese: 精武风云－陈真
Transcriptions
Standard Mandarin
- Hanyu Pinyin: Jīng Wǔ Fēng Yún－Chén Zhēn
Yue: Cantonese
- Jyutping: Zing1 Mou5 Fung1 Wan4－Can4 Zan1
- Directed by: Andrew Lau
- Screenplay by: Cheung Chi-shing; Gordon Chan; Philip Lui; Frankie Tam
- Produced by: Andrew Lau; Gordon Chan
- Starring: Donnie Yen; Shu Qi; Anthony Wong; Huang Bo; Kohata Ryuichi; Akira; Zhou Yang; Huo Siyan; Shawn Yue; Yasuaki Kurata
- Cinematography: Andrew Lau; Ng Man-ching
- Edited by: Azrael Chung
- Music by: Chan Kwong-wing
- Production companies: Media Asia Films; Enlight Pictures; Shanghai Film Media Asia; Basic Pictures
- Distributed by: Media Asia Distribution; Aeon Pix Studios (India)
- Release dates: 21 September 2010 (China); 23 September 2010 (Hong Kong)
- Running time: 106 minutes
- Countries: Hong Kong; China
- Languages: Cantonese; Mandarin; Japanese
- Budget: ¥120 million
- Box office: ¥136 million

Legend of the Fist: The Return of Chen Zhen is a 2010 Hong Kong martial arts superhero film directed by Andrew Lau, who produced with Gordon Chan, who also wrote the screenplay with Cheung Chi-shing, Philip Lui and Frankie Tam. The film stars Donnie Yen as Chen Zhen, a role made famous by Bruce Lee in the 1972 film Fist of Fury. The film is a sequel to the 1994 film Fist of Legend, which starred Jet Li as Chen Zhen. Principal photography for Legend of the Fist: The Return of Chen Zhen began in November 2009 and ended in early February 2010; shooting took place in Shanghai, China. The film was shown out of competition during the opening night of the 67th Venice International Film Festival, and 2010 Toronto International Film Festival. The film was released in Chinese theatres on 21 September 2010 and two days later in Hong Kong.

== Plot ==
The film is mainly set in China before the Second Sino-Japanese War. Chen Zhen joins a group of Chinese soldiers who fight alongside the Allies against the Germans in France during World War I. After the war, he returns to China and takes on the identity of his friend, Qi Tianyuan, who was killed in action.

Back in Shanghai, Chen joins an underground movement to counter an impending invasion of China by the Empire of Japan. He befriends Liu Yutian, the owner of a nightclub frequented by foreign dignitaries and becomes attracted to Kiki, a nightclub singer who is actually a Japanese spy. One night, Chen discovers that the Japanese are planning to assassinate General Zeng, the son of a northern warlord and push the blame to General Zhuo, a rival warlord. Zeng's death will spark a civil war between the two warlords and aid the subsequent Japanese invasion. Chen disguises himself as a masked superhero and saves Zeng by defeating the assassins. Following the failure of the operation, the Japanese government sends a list of names of anti-Japanese activists to Colonel Chikaraishi Takeshi, the leader of the Japanese spy agency in Shanghai, ordering him to kill the people on the list. Chikaraishi leaks the list to cause panic among the people, and pays a visit to the nightclub.

Aware of Chen's true identity, Chikaraishi challenges him to save the people on the list. Chen and Chikaraishi engage in a race against time to save and assassinate the activists, respectively. Some are killed while others manage to escape from Shanghai. Eventually, Chikaraishi's brother, Sasaki, leads a team of assassins to murder the editor of the Shanghai Times. Chen kills Sasaki, but fails to save the editor in time. In the meantime, Chen figures out that Kiki is a spy and warns her to leave. Chikaraishi starts distrusting Kiki and forces her to kill General Zeng's girlfriend, who is also one of her close friends. The blame is pushed to General Zhuo and the angered Zeng attacks Zhuo with support from Japanese forces. One night, the Japanese ambush Chen on the street, knock him unconscious and bring him to their headquarters to torture him.

Concurrently, Chen's friends stage a raid on the Japanese headquarters and cause serious damage with explosives before fleeing the scene. The Japanese track down Chen's comrades and kill them in revenge later. Chen is thrown out of a car in front of the nightclub and remains in a coma for days while he recovers from his injuries. With the Japanese invasion underway and General Zhuo killed in action with his forces in full retreat, there seems to be nothing that the movement can do to prevent the Japanese from occupying Shanghai. Chikaraishi challenges Chen to fight him and kills Kiki after she shows up. In anger, Chen defeats many Japanese combatants, after which he faces Chikaraishi in a one-on-one bout and wins. Chikaraishi is replaced with another officer while Chen dons his superhero costume and continues to help the movement oppose the invaders.

== Cast ==
- Donnie Yen as Chen Zhen, the protagonist of the film.
- Shu Qi as Kiki / Fang Qing / Captain Yamaguchi Yumi (Nihongo: 陸軍大尉 山口由美, Rikugun-Tai-i Yamaguchi Yumi), a Japanese spy, loosely based on Yoshiko Kawashima
- Anthony Wong as Liu Yutian, the owner of the nightclub Casablanca.
- Huang Bo as Inspector Huang Haolong, a police officer.
- Akira as Chikaraishi Sasaki (Nihongo: 力石佐々木, Rikiishi Sasaki), Colonel Chikaraishi's younger brother.
- Yasuaki Kurata as Chikaraishi Tsuyoshi (Nihongo: 力石剛, Rikiishi Tsuyoshi), Colonel Chikaraishi's father, the Hongkou dojo master who was defeated and killed by Chen Zhen years ago.
- Zhou Yang as Qi Zhishan, Qi Tianyuan's sister.
- Huo Siyan as Weiwei, General Zeng's girlfriend.
- Shawn Yue as General Zeng, a northern warlord whom Chen Zhen saves from assassins.
- Ma Yue as General Zhuo, General Zeng's rival.
- Ma Su as General Zhuo's wife
- Karl Dominik as Vincent, a police officer.
- Chen Jiajia as Huang Yun, a Japanese spy working at the Casablanca.
- Zhang Songwen as Wenzai, the editor of the Shanghai Times.
- Lü Xiaolin as Qiuting, a student protester.
- Kohata Ryu as Colonel Chikaraishi Takeshi (Nihongo: 陸軍大佐 力石武, Rikugun-Taisa Rikiishi Takeshi), the antagonist of the film.

== Development ==
This film is a continuation of the 1994 film Fist of Legend, with Donnie Yen taking over the role of Chen Zhen from Jet Li. Yen also previously played Chen Zhen in Fist of Fury, a 1995 television series adapted from the 1972 film of the same title which starred Bruce Lee as Chen Zhen.

In February 2007, Gordon Chan announced plans to make a follow-up feature film to the 1994 film Fist of Legend. It was announced that Yen would replace Li as Chen Zhen in the film, reprising his role from the 1995 television series.

== Production ==
The film was directed by Andrew Lau, who also co-produced the film and served as a cinematographer alongside his frequent partner Ng Man-ching. Gordon Chan co-wrote and co-produced the film, while John Chong served as an executive producer. The film was a co-production between Hong Kong film distributor Media Asia Films, Lau's production company Basic Pictures, and Chinese film producer Enlight Pictures.

Gordon Chan said that the film would not be another remake of Fist of Fury. He also said that in Fist of Legend, Chen Zhen is in his 20s, while in this film Chen is in his 30s.

=== Casting ===
Anthony Wong was cast in a supporting role prior to principal photography. Other supporting cast include Zhou Yang and Shu Qi playing two women who vie for Chen Zhen's affection. Huang Bo plays an underdog fighter, while Anthony Wong plays a local crime boss.

=== Filming ===
Principal photography for Legend of the Fist: The Return of Chen Zhen began on 15 November 2009, following a press conference attended by the cast and crew; filming took place in Shanghai and concluded in early February 2010.

=== Action choreography ===
The fight scenes were choreographed by Donnie Yen. For this film, Yen mentioned that he included nunchaku and the screaming elements as a tribute to Bruce Lee, who played Chen Zhen in the 1972 film Fist of Fury. Furthermore, he incorporated many mixed martial arts (MMA) elements in the film, coupled with the utilisation of Wing Chun. MMA is an interdisciplinary form of fighting utilising elements of Brazilian Jiu-Jitsu, judo, karate, boxing, kickboxing & wrestling, which are evident in the film.

Yen also stated that the concept behind Bruce Lee's Jeet Kune Do is similar to that of MMA, hence the incorporation of many forms of martial arts is a necessity in this film.

== Release ==
Legend of the Fist: The Return of Chen Zhen was released theatrically in Hong Kong on 23 September 2010. The film was released to theatres in the United States in its original, uncut international version by Variance Films on 22 April 2011. A total of 10 minutes of non-fighting scenes were included.

== Box office ==
The film grossed ¥65 million and ranked first in the box office during the first week of its theatrical run in China, but its total gross rose to only ¥136 million a month later. Donnie Yen was unhappy with the film distributors because many scenes were removed (about a total of 10 minutes of non-fighting scenes), and he commented on his Sina Weibo that the film's overall gross would not exceed ¥200 million. Producers Andrew Lau and Gordon Chan thought that the film will gross well in other countries.

== Reception ==
Legend of the Fist: The Return of Chen Zhen has been praised for its action scenes and Donnie Yen's performance, and received mostly mixed reviews.

As per negative reviews, Total Film gave the film two stars out of five, stating that the film "only comes alive when showcasing Yen's flamboyant fight choreography, glimpsed far too seldom – the longeurs in between the snappy scraps are sloppily written, and the clumsy Chinese nationalism is tedious". The Guardian gave the film two stars out of five finding the plot to be confusing. The Hollywood Reporter gave the film a mixed review referring to the film as "a popcorn movie of epic proportions" and that "one expects more from producer Gordon Chan and director Andrew Lau". On Rotten Tomatoes, the film received a 47% "rotten" rating based on 36 reviews.

Other reviews commented that the film is not about Chen Zhen, but a Hollywood-style superhero film; a combination of 007, Spider-Man, and Batman. Director Andrew Lau responded that a Hollywood-style superhero film is what people want to see, and he thinks that a 6:4 ratio of Hollywood style to traditional style is just right for the film.

== See also ==
- Donnie Yen filmography
- Hong Kong films of 2010
- Fist of Legend
- Fist of Fury
- Chen Zhen
