= Newton Lai =

Hong Kong actor (1951–2013)

Newton Lai (Chinese: 黎漢持; 28 April 1951 – 13 June 2013) was a Hong Kong film and television actor, whose career spanned 1978 to 2013.

== Life and career ==
In 1978, Lai began his career by appearing a series of martial arts films created by the Feng Huang Motion Picture Company. He moved to television in 1980 when he signed an acting contract with Rediffusion Television. His first television credit was in The Legendary Fok in 1983, which co-starred the actress Michelle Yim.

Lai joined TVB, Hong Kong's largest commercial television channel, in 1985. His credits with TVB included the dramas New Heavenly Sword and Dragon Sabre in 1986, The Legend of the Condor Heroes in 1994, Detective Investigation Files II in 1995, Twin of Brothers, and Strike At Heart. He continued to appear in television and film until his death from acute pneumonia on 13 June 2013, at the age of 62.
