= A Deadly Secret =

1963 wuxia novel by Jin Yong

- Cover of a 1985 edition of the novel
- Author: Jin Yong
- Original title: 連城訣
- Language: Chinese
- Genre: Wuxia
- Publisher: Ming Pao, Southeast Asia Weekly
- Publication date: 1963
- Publication place: Hong Kong
- Media type: Print
- ISBN: 9789628982646
- Preceded by: The Deer and the Cauldron
- Followed by: The Book and the Sword

A Deadly Secret
- Traditional Chinese: 連城訣
- Simplified Chinese: 连城诀
- Literal meaning: Mnemonic of the Linked Cities
Transcriptions
Standard Mandarin
- Hanyu Pinyin: Lián Chéng Jué
Yue: Cantonese
- Jyutping: Lin^{4} Sing^{4} Kyut^{3}

Su Xin Jian
- Traditional Chinese: 素心劍
- Simplified Chinese: 素心剑
Transcriptions
Standard Mandarin
- Hanyu Pinyin: Sù Xīn Jiàn
Yue: Cantonese
- Jyutping: Sou^{3} Sam^{1} Gim^{3}

A Deadly Secret (連城訣), also translated as Requiem of Ling Sing and Secret of the Linked Cities, is a wuxia novel by Jin Yong (Louis Cha). It was first serialised in the magazine Southeast Asia Weekly (東南亞周刊) and the Hong Kong newspaper Ming Pao in 1963. Its original Chinese title was Su Xin Jian before Jin Yong changed it to Lian Cheng Jue. The story follows the adventures of the protagonist Di Yun, a young peasant who is wrongfully imprisoned after being framed. In his quest for vengeance, he accidentally acquires the Liancheng Swordplay manual (連城劍谱), an ancient artefact prized for not only the skills detailed inside, but also a secret leading to a treasure.

== Plot ==
Di Yun, a young peasant from Xiangxi, accompanies his martial arts master Qi Zhangfa and the latter's daughter Qi Fang, who is also his childhood sweetheart, to attend the birthday party of Wan Zhenshan, Qi Zhangfa's senior. During the trip, Di Yun is framed for larceny and attempted rape, and gets arrested. Wan Zhenshan's son, Wan Gui, secretly bribes the magistrate to mete out a heavy sentence to Di Yun. At the same time, in order to win Qi Fang's affection, he pretends to speak up for Di Yun in court. Qi Fang, mistakenly believing that Di Yun is guilty, gives up on him.

In prison, Di Yun suffers and constantly gets harassed by his cellmate, Ding Dian. After they make peace, Ding Dian tells Di Yun how he had been entrusted with a highly coveted swordplay manual by a dying swordmaster Mei Niansheng, whose apprentices had betrayed him and attempted to murder him to seize the manual. Since then, Ding Dian had been the target of many martial artists who are after the manual. Ding Dian also teaches Di Yun a powerful neigong skill, which later proves to be a blessing to him.

Di Yun and Ding Dian break out of prison, but Ding Dian dies after being fatally poisoned by Ling Tuisi, the heartless father of his deceased lover. Di Yun then goes to find Qi Fang and learns that she has married Wan Gui, and they now have a daughter nicknamed "Kongxincai". Feeling emotionally hurt, Di Yun leaves and encounters a cannibalistic monk Baoxiang, whom he outwits and kills. After donning Baoxiang's robes, he is mistaken by the Blood Saber Sect's lascivious leader, Grandmaster Xuedao, for a grand-apprentice. Xuedao protects Di Yun from attacks by self-proclaimed righteous martial artists, captures a woman called Shui Sheng, and holds her hostage while they flee.

The trio encounter an avalanche, causing them to be trapped in a valley in the Daxue Mountains. Xuedao kills three of the pursuers, one of whom is Shui Sheng's father. After that, he attempts to kill Di Yun when he realises that Di Yun is not really his grand-apprentice. Unexpectedly, Xuedao's strike helps Di Yun complete his neigong cycle; Di Yun turns the tables on Xuedao and kills him. The last surviving pursuer, Hua Tiegan, reveals his true colours after Xuedao's death and feeds on the dead bodies of his three companions to survive. While Di Yun, Shui Sheng and Hua Tiegan remain in the valley to wait for the snow to melt, Shui Sheng sees Di Yun's kindness beneath his seeming misanthropy. When they finally exit the valley, Hua Tiegan accuses Di Yun and Shui Sheng of sexual immorality in front of Shui Sheng's fiancé. Di Yun separates himself from Shui Sheng and continues on his lonely quest for vengeance.

Di Yun tracks down the perpetrators responsible for his wrongful incarceration and learns that his respected master Qi Zhangfa is actually a scheming and ruthless villain – just like what Ding Dian had told him. Qi Fang is mercilessly killed by Wan Gui when he suspects her of infidelity. As the story progresses, all the antagonists eventually find the swordplay manual in a temple, where they start fighting over the treasure. They become insane after coming into contact with the deadly venom smeared on the jewels.

After witnessing these beastly acts, especially Qi Fang's death, Di Yun becomes totally disillusioned with humanity's dark nature. He takes Kongxincai with him to the valley and intends to lead a reclusive life there. To his surprise, he meets Shui Sheng, who has been waiting for his return.

== Principal characters ==
- Di Yun (狄雲) – the protagonist who is wrongfully imprisoned but escapes to take his revenge and uncover the truth.
- Ding Dian (丁典) – Di Yun's cellmate who teaches him a neigong skill and tells him about the swordplay manual that was entrusted to him by Mei Niansheng.
- Qi Fang (戚芳) – Qi Zhangfa's daughter and Di Yun's childhood sweetheart who marries Wan Gui.
- Shui Sheng (水笙) – Shui Dai's daughter who sees Di Yun for his kind nature and falls in love with him.
- Qi Zhangfa (戚長發) – Di Yun's martial arts master and Mei Niansheng's second apprentice.
- Wan Zhenshan (萬震山) – Mei Niansheng's first apprentice who conspired with his two juniors to murder their master and seize the swordplay manual.
- Yan Daping (言達平) – Mei Niansheng's third apprentice who pretends to teach Di Yun some swordsmanship techniques to frame him for larceny.
- Wan Gui (萬圭) – Wan Zhenshan's son who marries Qi Fang.
- Grandmaster Xuedao (血刀老祖) – the evil leader of the Blood Saber Sect (血刀門).
- Baoxiang (寶象) – a cannibalistic monk and one of Xuedao's apprentices.
- Mei Niansheng (梅念笙) – a swordmaster who trained Qi Zhangfa, Wan Zhenshan and Yan Daping. He was betrayed and murdered by his three apprentices.
- "Kongxincai" ('hollow-hearted vegetable' (空心菜)) – Wan Gui and Qi Fang's daughter.
- Ling Tuisi (凌退思) – a cruel magistrate who buried alive his daughter Ling Shuanghua (凌霜華) to stop her from having a relationship with Ding Dian.
- "Luohua Liushui" (落花流水) – a group of four self-proclaimed righteous martial artists who are hunting down Grandmaster Xuedao.

== Timeframe and literary precedent ==
Although the novel's historical setting is not explicitly mentioned, readers speculate that it is set in the 17th or 18th century during the Qing dynasty, judging from the illustrations in the published Chinese versions authorised by Jin Yong, which show male characters wearing queues. Wu Liuqi, a character in The Deer and the Cauldron, is mentioned in the third edition of A Deadly Secret, confirming that A Deadly Secret is set in the Qing dynasty.

The plot is inspired by the story of a servant who worked for Jin Yong's grandfather Zha Wenqing (查文清). Zha Wenqing, who was a local magistrate in Jiangsu, had taken in the man as a servant during the anti-missionary riots in 1891.

Some commentators feel that the plot resembles that of The Count of Monte Cristo by Alexandre Dumas, except that they are based in different countries and historical periods. Jin Yong has also stated that he had been influenced by Dumas, his favourite non-Chinese novelist.

== Adaptations ==
=== Films ===
| Year | Production | Main cast | Additional information |
|---|---|---|---|
| 1980 | Shaw Brothers Studio (Hong Kong) | Ng Yuen-chun, Liu Lai-ling, Jason Pai, Shih Szu, Elliot Ngok | See A Deadly Secret (film) |

=== Television ===
| Year | Production | Main cast | Additional information |
|---|---|---|---|
| 1989 | TVB (Hong Kong) | Roger Kwok, Kitty Lai, Shallin Tse | See Deadly Secret |
| 2004 | NMTV (Mainland China) | Wu Yue, He Meitian, Shu Chang | See Lian Cheng Jue (TV series) |

=== Radio ===
In 1981, Hong Kong's RTHK produced a 25 episodes radio drama based on the novel and the intro song performed by Adam Cheng.
