= Fearless (2006 film) =

2006 Hong Kong–Chinese martial arts film

- Theatrical release poster
- 霍元甲
- Directed by: Ronny Yu
- Written by: Chris Chow; Christine To; Wang Bin; Li Feng
- Produced by: William Kong; Jet Li; Ronny Yu; Yeung Bo-ting; Po-chu Chui; Han Sanping
- Starring: Jet Li; Nakamura Shidō II; Sun Li; Dong Yong; Nathan Jones; Collin Chou; Masato Harada
- Cinematography: Poon Hang-sang; Ray Wong
- Edited by: Virginia Katz; Richard Learoyd
- Music by: Shigeru Umebayashi
- Distributed by: Edko Films (Hong Kong); China Film Group (China)
- Release date: 26 January 2006
- Running time: 105 minutes
- Countries: Hong Kong; China
- Languages: Mandarin; Cantonese; Japanese; English
- Budget: RMB 90 million (US$18 million)+
- Box office: US$68.1 million

Fearless, also known as Huo Yuanjia (霍元甲) in Chinese, as Spirit in Japan and as Jet Li's Fearless in the United Kingdom and the United States, is a 2006 martial arts film directed by Ronny Yu, starring Jet Li. A Hong Kong-Chinese co-production, it is loosely based on the life of Huo Yuanjia, a Chinese martial artist who challenged foreign fighters in highly publicized events, restoring pride and nationalism to China at a time when Western, Russian and Japanese imperialism were eroding the country in the final years of the Qing dynasty before the birth of the Republic of China. Li stated that the film was his last wushu martial arts film, a point also made in the film's television promotions and other publicity, although he would do action films with martial arts in them and did not rule out historical epics with martial arts.

Fearless was released on 26 January 2006 in Hong Kong, on 23 June 2006 in the United Kingdom, and on 22 September 2006 in the United States. The film received generally positive reviews from critics. At the 13th Hong Kong Film Critics Society Awards, it won the Film of Merit.

== Synopsis ==
In 1910, Chinese martial artist Huo Yuanjia defeats three foreign challengers at an international tournament in Shanghai. As he awaits a fourth match, he reflects on his life.

As a child, Huo secretly learns martial arts despite his father's objections due to his asthma. After witnessing his father lose honorably and suffering humiliation himself, Huo vows to restore the Huo family's name. As an adult, following his father's death, he becomes a prominent lei tai fighter in Tianjin, earning fame but also growing arrogant and reckless. He squanders his wealth, alienates his friend Nong Jinsun, and kills a rival martial artist, Qin Lei, in a fight. Qin's godson retaliates by murdering Huo's mother and daughter. Devastated and guilt-ridden, Huo leaves Tianjin.

After wandering for months, Huo is taken in by Granny Sun and her blind granddaughter, Yueci. Living simply as a farmer, he recovers physically and spiritually, learning humility and compassion. In 1907, Huo returns to Tianjin, now heavily influenced by foreign powers. He burns his trophies, seeks forgiveness from those he had wronged, and reconciles with Nong.

When an Irish wrestler, Hercules O’Brien, humiliates Chinese fighters, Huo challenges and defeats him honorably, restoring national pride. He then helps found the Jingwu School in Shanghai, promoting martial arts as moral self-cultivation. Alarmed foreign businessmen arrange a final challenge against four fighters. One of them, a Japanese martial artist called Tanaka Anno, befriends and respects Huo.

The story returns to the tournament, where Tanaka is revealed as Huo's fourth opponent. After a first round with weapons that ends in a draw, Huo is secretly poisoned before their unarmed match. Despite failing health, Huo continues fighting and defeats Tanaka while deliberately sparing his life. Huo collapses and dies, and Tanaka declares him the rightful victor.

In the epilogue, Yueci envisions Huo's spirit practicing martial arts peacefully.

== Cast ==
- Jet Li as Huo Yuanjia, a Chinese martial artist who founded Jingwu School.
- Dong Yong as Nong Jinsun, a businessman and childhood friend of Huo Yuanjia.
- Collin Chou as Huo Endi, Huo Yuanjia's father.
- Betty Sun as Yueci (Moon), a village girl who took care of Huo Yuanjia when he was in a state of depression.
- Nathan Jones as Hercules O'Brien, the Irish wrestler.
- Paw Hee-ching as Huo Yuanjia's mother
- Mike Leeder as Randall, the match referee.
- Anthony De Longis as Anthony Garcia, the Spanish fencer.
- Brandon Rhea as Colonel Han Herzon, the Belgian lancer.
- Jean-Claude Leuyer as Peter Smith, the British boxer.
- Somluck Kamsing as Beicha, the Muay Thai kickboxer. He appears only in the director's cut.
- Masato Harada as Mr. Mita, a Japanese businessman who arranged Huo Yuanjia's poisoning.
- John T. Benn as an American businessman.
- Philippe Millieret as a French businessman.
- John Paisley as a British businessman.
- Michelle Yeoh as Ms. Yang, the narrator who appears only in the director's cut.
- Hu Xiaoling as Jade, Huo Yuanjia's daughter.
- Chen Zhihui as Qin Lei (Master Chin), a rival martial arts master who was killed by Huo Yuanjia.
- Qu Yun as Granny Sun, Yueci's grandmother.
- Ma Zhongxuan as Zhao Jian, Huo Yuanjia's childhood rival.
- Jacky Heung as Qin Lei's godson who kills Huo Yuanjia's family to avenge his godfather.
- Nakamura Shidō II as Anno Tanaka, an honorable Japanese fighter who respects Huo Yuanjia.

== Production ==
=== Alternate versions ===
The film was originally approximately 140 minutes long, but had to be cut to 105 minutes for its theatrical run. Scenes of Michelle Yeoh and a fight scene between Jet Li and Somluck Kamsing were removed. A special release of the film in Thailand in March 2006 reinserted the scenes with Somluck (but not Michelle Yeoh), making its new running time approximately 110 minutes. In January 2007, Ronny Yu's original 140-minute director's cut was given an official DVD release in Hong Kong, featuring the full Michelle Yeoh scene as well as the fight scene with Somluck Kamsing.

Within the Somluck Kamsing scene, there are two different endings. In the director's cut, the fight ends after Huo Yuanjia stops the Thai boxer from falling head first. In an alternate scene, the Thai boxer continues to fight after this and Huo appears to kill him with the exterminating blow, only to see that he had resisted, in which the boxer realises this and ends the fight.

==== Director's cut ====
Universal released the full 140-minute director's cut on DVD in North America in July 2008. The released DVD, however, contained two discs and has been reported to errantly contain both the existing American theatrical version and the existing unrated version and not the actual director's cut on either of the discs. However, many people were able to get replacement copies that had the director's cut after sending a complaint on their website.

In December 2008, Universal released the Blu-ray version of the film, which contains the three versions (Theatrical, Unrated, and Director's Cut) in a single disc.

== Reception ==
On the review aggregator website Rotten Tomatoes, 73% of 109 critics' reviews are positive, with an average rating of 6.7/10. The website's consensus reads: "Fearless is a brilliantly choreographed, beautifully filmed endcap to Li's quarter decade of epic martial arts glory." Metacritic, which uses a weighted average, assigned the film a score of 70 out of 100, based on 24 critics, indicating "generally favorable" reviews. Empire gave two stars out of five, with a verdict stating, "Despite impressive, CG-light action sequences and an absorbing story which certainly stands another re-telling, director Ronny Yu barely elevates this above the level of a direct-to-video fightfest. Hero or Crouching Tiger it ain't."

Fearless opened in Hong Kong on 26 January 2006 during the Lunar New Year. The film played to blockbuster business, eventually grossed an exceptional HK$30,201,600 by the end of its run on 8 March 2006, making it the highest-grossing domestic film of the territory of 2006.

On 22 September 2006, Fearless was released in 1,806 North American cinemas under the title Jet Li's Fearless. In its opening weekend, it came in second at the box office to the sequel to Jackass, grossing US$10,590,244 (US$5,863 per screen). It was Jet Li's seventh film in a row to open to over US$10 million. The film went on to gross US$24,633,730 by the end of its North American run—making it the sixth highest-grossing non-English language foreign film in the United States to date—and its total worldwide gross US$68,072,848.

== Controversy ==
In March 2006, Huo Yuanjia's real-life descendants filed a defamation lawsuit against Jet Li and the film's producers and distributors over historical inaccuracies in the film. 81-year-old Huo Shoujin, a grandson of Huo Yuanjia, stated he was unhappy that the movie showed his grandfather causing "trouble", which led to the deaths of his family members. Huo Shoujin also denounced the filmmakers for depicting his grandfather as a violent fighter. In December 2006, a court in Beijing dismissed the case, stating that although Fearless was an exaggerated and fictitious portrayal of Huo Yuanjia, it "contained no defamatory or libelous depictions".

== Soundtrack ==
The film's soundtrack was composed by Shigeru Umebayashi, while the ending theme song of the same name as the film was composed and sung by Jay Chou. In the song, Chou sings in a falsetto voice for a few segments. In the Japanese release of the film, the ending theme song was changed to "Crime" by High and Mighty Color, upsetting many Japanese fans of the original song.

== Awards and nominations ==
| Organization | Award | Nominee | Result | Ref |
|---|---|---|---|---|
| 26th Hong Kong Film Awards | Best Action Choreography | Yuen Woo-ping | Won | |
| 26th Hong Kong Film Awards | Best Film | Fearless | Nominated | |
| 26th Hong Kong Film Awards | Best Actor | Jet Li | Nominated | |
| 26th Hong Kong Film Awards | Best New Performer | Betty Sun | Nominated | |
| 26th Hong Kong Film Awards | Best Film Editing | Virginia Katz, Richard Learoyd | Nominated | |
| 26th Hong Kong Film Awards | Best Original Song | "Fearless" (composer: Jay Chou, lyricist: Vincent Fang, singer: Jay Chou) | Nominated | |
| 26th Hong Kong Film Awards | Best Sound Design | Richard Yawn | Nominated | |
| 13th Hong Kong Film Critics Society Awards | Best actor | Jet Li | Won | |
| 13th Hong Kong Film Critics Society Awards | Film of Merit | Fearless | Won | |
| 43rd Golden Horse Awards | Best Action Choreography | Yuen Woo-ping | Nominated | |

== See also ==
- Jet Li filmography
