= Huo Endi =

Chinese martial artist

Huo Endi (Chinese: 霍恩第) (1836–1917) was a Chinese martial artist and the father of famous Chinese martial artist Huo Yuanjia. Huo Endi, a 6th-generation successor of Mizongyi was a well-known martial artist who served as a bodyguard for caravans travelling to the Northeast. In the 2006 film Fearless he died shortly before his son rose to fame, but in reality he outlived his son by about seven years.

== In popular culture ==
- Huo Endi (played by Collin Chou) is portrayed in Jet Li's 2006 film Fearless.
- Bryan Leung played Huo Endi in the 2008 TV series The Legendary Fok.
- Eddy Ko played Huon Endi in the Heroes.
