= A Deadly Secret (film) =

1980 Hong Kong film by Mou Tun-fei

- DVD cover art
- 連城訣
- Directed by: Mou Tun-fei
- Screenplay by: Ni Kuang
- Based on: A Deadly Secret by Jin Yong
- Produced by: Run Run Shaw
- Starring: Ng Yuen-chun; Liu Lai-ling; Jason Pai; Shih Szu; Elliot Ngok
- Cinematography: Law Wan-sing
- Edited by: Chiang Hsing-lung; Cheung Siu-hei
- Music by: Eddie H. Wang
- Production company: Shaw Brothers Studio
- Distributed by: Shaw Brothers Studio
- Release date: 23 September 1980
- Running time: 90 minutes
- Country: Hong Kong
- Language: Mandarin
- Box office: HK$1,473,133

A Deadly Secret (連城訣) is a 1980 Hong Kong wuxia film directed by Mou Tun-fei, produced by the Shaw Brothers Studio, and starring Ng Yuen-chun, Liu Lai-ling, Jason Pai, Shih Szu, and Elliot Ngok. Adapted from Jin Yong's 1963 novel of the same title, the film follows Di Yun, a young martial artist who is falsely imprisoned and uncovers a conspiracy in the jianghu that forces him to confront those he once revered and respected.

== Synopsis ==
Di Yun, an apprentice of the renowned martial artist Qi Zhangfa, is imprisoned after being framed for larceny and rape. His senior Wan Gui and his master's daughter Qi Fang, whom he loves, seem to think that he is indeed guilty. His master also appears to have abandoned him. When he learns that Qi Fang has married Wan Gui, he is so devastated that he attempts suicide. However, his fellow cellmate Ding Dian saves him and warns him of impending danger.

Several martial artists are later put in jail as well for apparently committing various crimes, and end up in the same cell as Ding Dian. It turns out that they are after something called the Liancheng Manual, whose whereabouts are known only to Ding Dian. Ding Dian refuses to hand it over and kills all his opponents. Impressed by Ding Dian's prowess, Di Yun begs him to teach him martial arts and makes great progress.

Ding Dian's lover, Ling Shuanghua, is the magistrate Ling Tuisi's daughter. She is caught in her father's vicious scheme to force Ding Dian to hand over the manual. Eventually, she is locked in a coffin and slowly suffocates to death. When Ding Dian and Di Yun break out of prison to attend the funeral, Ding Dian touches the coffin and realises that the lid has been coated with poison. Ling Tuisi then tries to coerce Ding Dian into handing over the manual in exchange for the antidote, but Ding Dian refuses and they fight. Di Yun intervenes and rescues a weakened Ding Dian.

Before succumbing to his wounds, Ding Dian reveals that the manual belonged to Mei Niansheng, the martial arts master of Qi Zhangfa, Yan Daping and Wan Zhenshan. The three apprentices had betrayed their master in a bid to obtain the manual. A mortally injured Mei Niansheng had managed to tell Ding Dian where the manual is hidden before dying.

Eventually, the manual's location is revealed to be in a Buddha statue in a temple. Ling Tuisi, Qi Zhangfa, Wan Zhenshan, Wan Gui and Qi Fang show up, and the villains start fighting over the treasure hidden in the statue. After they come into contact with the treasure, they realise that it has been smeared with a deadly poison. During the ensuing chaos, Di Yun kills Ling Tuisi, Wan Gui and Yan Daping, but also inadvertently fatally wounds Qi Fang. He emerges the sole survivor and burns down the temple.

== Cast ==
- Ng Yuen-chun as Di Yun
- Liu Lai-ling as Qi Fang
- Jason Pai Piao as Ding Dian
- Shih Szu as Ling Shuanghua
- Elliot Ngok as Ling Tuisi
- Walter Tso as Wan Zhenshan
- Dick Wei as Wan Gui
- Tong Kam-tong as Qi Zhangfa
- Wai Wang as Yan Daping
- Kwan Fung as Mei Niansheng
- Chan Shen as Bozhang
