= Huo Yuanjia =

Chinese martial artist (1868–1910)

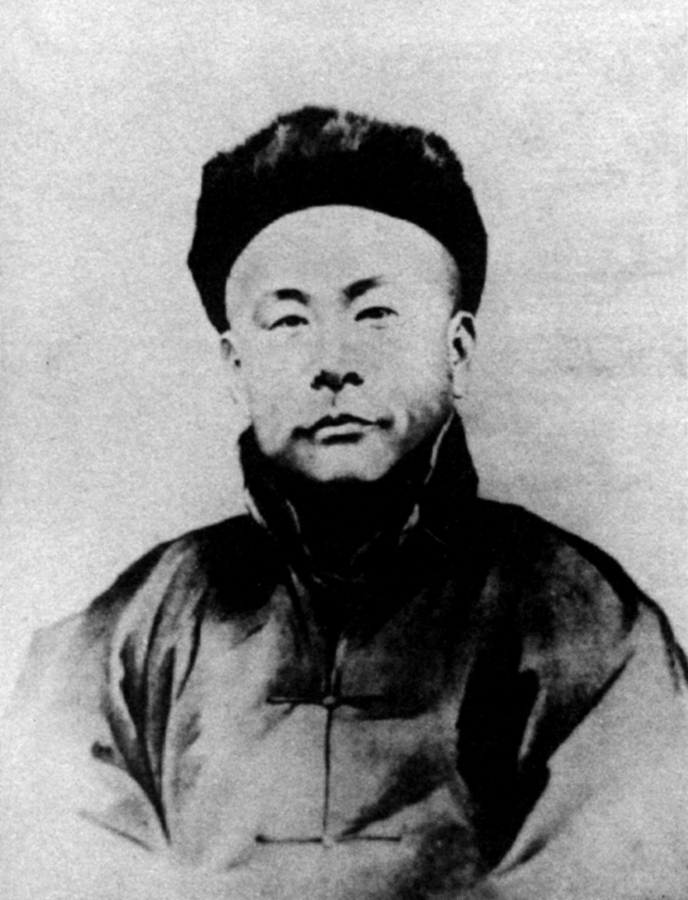
- Born: 18 January 1868; Jinghai County, Tianjin, Qing dynasty
- Died: 14 September 1910 (aged 42); Shanghai, Qing dynasty
- Native name: 霍元甲
- Style: Wushu; Mizongyi
- Teachers: Chen Seng-ho; Huo Endi

Other information
- Occupation: Martial artist
- Spouse: Ms. Wang (before 1910) (Note: Given name is unknown.)
- Children: 5
- Notable relatives: Huo Endi (father)
- Notable club: Chin Woo Athletic Association

Chinese name
- Chinese: 霍元甲
Transcriptions
Standard Mandarin
- Hanyu Pinyin: Huò Yuánjiǎ
- Wade–Giles: Huo Yüan-chia
Yue: Cantonese
- Jyutping: Fok3 Jyun4-gaap3

Junqing (courtesy name)
- Chinese: 俊卿
Transcriptions
Standard Mandarin
- Hanyu Pinyin: Jùnqīng
- Wade–Giles: Chün-ching

Huo Yuanjia (Note: Chinese: 霍元甲) (18 January 1868 – 14 September 1910), courtesy name Jùnqīng, (Note: Chinese: 俊卿) was a Chinese martial artist and co-founder of the Chin Woo Athletic Association, a martial arts school in Shanghai. A practitioner of the martial art Mizongyi, Huo is considered a hero in China for defeating foreign fighters in highly publicised matches at a time when Chinese sovereignty was being eroded by foreign imperialism, concessions and spheres of influence. Due to his heroic status, the legends and myths surrounding the events in his life are difficult to distinguish from facts.

== Early life ==
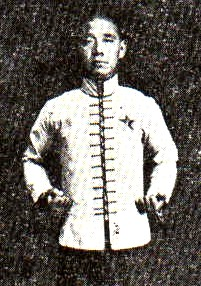
A young Huo Yuanjia

Huo was born in Xiaonanhe Village in Jinghai County, Tianjin, as the fourth of Huo Endi's ten children. The family's main source of income was agriculture, but Huo Endi also made a living by escorting merchant caravans to Manchuria and back. Although he was from a family of traditional Wushu practitioners, Huo was born weak and susceptible to illness. He had asthma and, at an early age, contracted jaundice, which would recur periodically for the rest of his life. It is theorised that he may have had a mild form of congenital jaundice known as Gilbert's syndrome. Due to his frail frame, his father discouraged him from learning Wushu.

Huo Endi hired Chen Seng-ho, a tutor from Japan, to teach his son academics and moral values. In return, Chen was taught the Huo family's style of martial arts, mizongyi. Huo still desired to learn Wushu, against his father's wishes, so he observed his father teaching his students martial arts in the day and secretly practised at night with Chen.

In 1890, a martial artist from Henan visited the Huo family and fought with Huo's elder brother, defeating him. To the surprise of his family, Huo fought with his brother's opponent and defeated the latter. As Huo proved that he was physically able to practise Wushu, his father accepted him as a student. As he became older, Huo went on to challenge martial artists from neighbouring areas and his fame grew as he defeated more opponents in bouts.

Huo joined his father at work as a caravan guard. One day, while escorting a group of monks, Huo was confronted by a group of bandits, who threatened to attack the monks. Huo fought the bandit chief and defeated him. News of his feat spread and added to his growing fame. In 1896, Huo went to Tianjin and made a living there by working as a porter in the Huaiqing pharmacy and by selling firewood.

== Rise to fame ==
In 1902, Huo responded to a challenge advertised by a Russian wrestler in Xiyuan Park, Tianjin. The wrestler openly called the Chinese "sick men of Asia" because no one accepted his challenge to a fight. The Russian forfeited when Huo accepted his challenge and apologised for his earlier remark in the newspaper.

Between 1909 and 1910, Huo travelled to Shanghai twice to accept an open challenge posed by an Irish boxer, Hercules O'Brien. The two of them had arguments over the rules governing such boxing matches and eventually agreed that whoever knocked down his opponent would be the victor. O'Brien supposedly fought Huo and lost. Huo's victory was a great inspiration to the Chinese people and had them questioning the basis of imperialistic dominance. However, there is a lot of controversy over whether the fight ever took place. A recent article states that O'Brien opted to leave town instead.

== Chin Woo Athletic Association ==
Between 1909 and 1910, Huo founded the Chin Woo Physical Training Centre (精武體操會) (later renamed Chin Woo Athletic Association) with his friend Nong Jinsun, who served as the president of the association. Huo was encouraged by his friends and was sponsored by Sun Yat-sen and Song Jiaoren, who were living in Tokyo. The centre was meant to be a school for learning self-defence and improving health and mind.

Huo suffered from jaundice and tuberculosis and started seeing a Japanese physician for medication and treatment. The physician, who was a member of the Japanese Judo Association in Shanghai, invited Huo to a competition upon hearing of his fame. One of Huo's students, Liu Zhensheng (劉振聲), competed with a judo practitioner. Although there were disputes over who won the match, both sides generally agreed that the disagreement culminated in a brawl and that members of the judo team, including the head instructor, were injured, some with broken fingers and hands.

== Death ==
Huo died in 1910 at the age of 42. He was survived by his wife Ms. Wang (王氏; died 1960), two sons Huo Dongzhang (霍東章) and Huo Dongge (霍東閣), and three daughters Huo Dongru (霍東茹), Huo Dongling (霍東玲) and Huo Dongqin (霍東琴).

The historian Chen Gongzhe, who was also one of Huo's students, believed that the cause of his master's death was hemoptysis. Chen wrote that Huo was introduced to a Japanese physician by the judo instructor as his health declined. The physician prescribed some medicine for his condition, but Huo's health continued to deteriorate. Huo was admitted to the Shanghai Red Cross Hospital, where he died two weeks later. Although Chen did not mention that the medicine prescribed by the Japanese physician contained arsenic or any other poison, some leaders of the Chin Woo Athletic Association speculated that Huo was poisoned around the time of his death. People believed that the Japanese were jealous of his fame and prowess in martial arts.

In 1989, Huo and his wife's graves were excavated and their remains were relocated elsewhere. Black spots were discovered in Huo's pelvic bones. The Tianjin Municipality Police Laboratory confirmed that they contained arsenic. However, it is difficult to ascertain whether Huo's death was caused by malicious poisoning or by the prescription of medicine. This was because arsenic trioxide has been used therapeutically for approximately 2,400 years as part of traditional Chinese medicine.

== Legacy ==
Huo died months after co-founding the Chin Woo Athletic Association. Before his death, he invited Zhao Lianhe of the Shaolin Mizong Style to teach in Chin Woo and Zhao agreed. Subsequently, a number of other martial arts masters agreed to teach at the school. They included Eagle Claw master Chen Zizheng, Seven Star Praying Mantis master Luo Guangyu, Xingyiquan master Geng Xiaguang, and Wu Jianquan, the founder of Wu-style taijiquan. In June 1910, the Eastern Times announced the establishment of the Chin Woo association in Huo's name. It was the first civil martial arts organisation in China that was not associated with a particular school or style.

== In popular culture ==
Huo's life has been adapted into films and television series. In these adaptations, Huo is typically depicted as a heroic martial artist who fights to uphold the dignity of the Chinese people in the face of foreign aggression. He is secretly poisoned to death by foreigners, usually the Japanese, who see him as a threat to their exploitation of China. A notable feature in some of these adaptations is the appearance of Chen Zhen, a fictional character first portrayed by Bruce Lee in the 1972 film Fist of Fury (released in the U.S. as The Chinese Connection). In the film, Chen Zhen is one of Huo's apprentices. He brings his teacher's murderers to justice and ensures that Huo's legacy, the Jingwu School and "Jingwu Spirit", continues to live on. Notable actors who have portrayed Huo on screen include Wong Yuen-sun in The Legendary Fok (1981), Bryan Leung in Legend of a Fighter (1982), Eddy Ko in Fist of Fury (1995), Vincent Zhao in Huo Yuanjia (2001), Jet Li in Fearless (2006), and Ekin Cheng in Huo Yuanjia (2008). Vincent Zhao portrayed him in the TV drama Heroes.
