= Mizongyi =

Chinese martial art

Mizongyi 迷蹤藝
- Also known as: Lost Track Skill, Lost Track Fist / Mizongquan (迷蹤拳), Lost Track Fist / My Jong Law Horn (迷蹤羅漢拳) / Mizong Luohan (迷踪羅漢)
- Focus: Striking
- Country of origin: Greater China
- Creator: Yue Fei (attributed)
- Famous practitioners: Huo Endi; Huo Yuanjia; Cheng Juxiao; Ye Yu Ting; Chi-Hung Marr; Johnny Kwong Ming Lee; Henry Su; John Su
- Parenthood: Northern Chinese martial arts, Northern Shaolin kung fu
- Descendant arts: Mizong Luohan
- Olympic sport: No

Mizongyi (Chinese: 迷蹤藝; pinyin: Mízōngyì; lit. 'Lost Track Skill') (Note: Also known as Mizongquan (迷蹤拳; Mízōngquán; 'Lost Track Fist'), Yanqingquan (Chinese: 燕青拳; pinyin: Yànqīngquán; lit. 'Blue Swallow Fist'), "Labyrinthine Boxing", or simply Mizong) is a style of Chinese martial art based on deception and mobility.

As an external northern Chinese style, Mizong belongs to the "Long Fist" family of martial arts although in some traditions Mizongyi is considered an internal art, created by Yue Fei, and taught as a precursor system to xingyiquan. Mizongyi was created by Cheng Juxiao. Cheng learned from his maternal grandfather and mother, both of whom were also practitioners of Mizongyi.

The art began to grow popular in 1901 due to the deeds of Huo Yuanjia, a Mizongyi master. Huo Yuanjia's father, Huo Endi is a 6th-generation successor of Mizongyi.

There are many sub-branches of Mizongyi. One such sub-branch is Mizong Luohan (Chinese: 迷蹤羅漢; pinyin: mízōng luóhàn; lit. 'Lost Track Arhat'), which combines Mizongyi with Luohanquan. Through Luohanquan, its lineage can be traced back to the Shaolin temple during the time of the Tang dynasty.

== Description ==
Mizong Luohan is an external style, with distinct internal influences. It draws on many aspects of the external Northern Shaolin long-fist style, and the internal styles tai chi and baguazhang, which are often taught alongside it in modern times. It is characterized by deceptive hand movements, intricate footwork, varied kicks, and high leaps. The style changes very quickly when executed. The emphasis on flexibility in Northern Shaolin kung fu styles is the guiding principle of Mizong, and this is evident in the versatility of its attacks and the extent to which it integrates core concepts of multiple internal styles.

Mizong Luohan's system was presided over by Grandmaster Ye Yu Ting in the twentieth century until his death in 1962, at the age of 70. A number of his students such as Masters Chi-Hung Marr, Raymond K. Wong, and Johnny Lee emigrated to North America in the 1960s and have continued to teach this system in various locations around the United States of America, from Los Angeles, Dallas, Texas, Coppell, Texas, to Hawaii and Canada.

Mizong has also been continued to be taught as a foundation art to xingyiquan within the Yue Jia Ba Shao/Geng Jishan tradition in London, England. Within this tradition, Mizong was primarily taught to children, as from a learning perspective the technical and internal aspects of the art are less sophisticated (i.e., more external) than in xingyiquan.

== In popular media ==
- In the Virtua Fighter fighting game franchise, this is the fighting style of the main characters Pai-chan and her father Lau-chan.

== See also ==
- Huo Yuanjia
