= Chin Woo Athletic Association =

Martial arts organisation

- 精武體育會
- Formation: July 7, 1910; 116 years ago
- Founder: Huo Yuanjia
- Location: China

Chin Woo Athletic Association (simplified Chinese: 精武体育会; traditional Chinese: 精武體育會; pinyin: Jīngwǔ Tǐyùhuì) (Note: Its name is also spelled in many other ways throughout the world - Jing Wu, Ching Mo, Chin Woo, Ching Mou, Ching Wu, Jing Mo, Jing Wo - based on different romanizations of the same two Chinese characters (Chinese: 精武; pinyin: Jīng Wǔ; Wade–Giles: Ching Wu; Jyutping: Zing^{1} Mou^{5}; lit. 'mastering martial art')) is an international martial arts organization founded in Shanghai, China, on July 7, 1910, but some sources cite dates in 1909. It has almost over 80 branches based in 30 or more countries worldwide, where it is usually known as an "athletic association" or "federation".

== History ==
Jing Wu was founded as the Jing Wu Athletic Association in Shanghai, China in the early 20th century. Many sources, including the official websites of its branches in various countries, claim that Jing Wu was founded by the martial artist Huo Yuanjia, who died shortly after its establishment. Jing Wu was actually founded by a committee of persons, including members of the Tongmenghui, such as Chen Qimei, Nong Zhu/Jinsun农劲荪, and Chen Tiesheng. Due to Huo's popularity and recent death, the committee had decided that he should be the "face" of Jing Wu, resulting in his strong association with it.

As one of the first public martial arts institutes in China, Jing Wu was intended to create a structured environment for teaching and learning martial arts as opposed to the secretive training that had been common in the past. The founders of Jing Wu felt that the association would keep alive traditions that secrecy and social change would otherwise doom. The basic curriculum drew from several styles of martial arts, giving practitioners a well-rounded martial background in addition to whatever they wished to specialize in. Jing Wu inspired the ecumenism seen in the Chinese martial arts community during the Republican era, giving rise to such efforts as the National Martial Arts Institutes. Sun Yat-sen, founder of the Republic of China, attended the third annual event held by Jing Wu in 1915, giving a speech of encouragement to the attendees. When Sun Yat-sen attended again at the 10th annual event in 1920, he also wrote for a special Jing Wu newsletter and made a plaque with the engraving "martial spirit".

During the period of the Japanese sphere of influence, the Twenty-One Demands sent to the government of the Republic of China resulted in two treaties with Japan on 25 May 1915. This prevented the ruling class from exercising full control over the commoners. With their new freedom, Huo's students purchased a new building to serve as the organization's headquarters and named it "Jing Wu Athletic Association". The association accepted new styles of martial arts other than those taught by Huo. In 1918, Jing Wu Athletic Association opened a branch at Nathan Road in Hong Kong.

In 1920, Jing Wu Athletic Association sent five representatives to Southeast Asia to expand their activities overseas after multiple requests were made by Southeast Asian Chinese associations for Jing Wu personnel to travel to Malaysia. These representatives were martial arts teacher Ye Shutian, editor-in-chief of Seventy-two Commercial Daily Luo Xiaoao, Shanghai businessman Li Huisheng, principal of Shanghai Guangzhao Public Girls School Chen Shichao, and Shanghai business celebrity Chen Gongzhe. After departing from Hong Kong, the five ambassadors first arrived in Saigon, Vietnam on August 24, 1920. Ten days later, they would arrive in Singapore. On September 2, 1920 the five ambassadors would take an overnight train to Kuala Lumpur where following their martial arts performance, local leaders would lobby to propose the establishing Jing Wu branches. In 1924, Jing Wu organizations would also be successfully established in the former French colonial areas of Vietnam, including Saigon and Haiphong.

== Training system ==
After the Boxer Rebellion, Chinese martial arts faced ridicule and uncertainty. Through creating a leadership network of political and commercial elites, replicating formal organizational structures, and establishing a system of membership, Chin Woo aimed to preserve and develop Chinese martial arts using a professionally organized model in order to ensure its survival as China transitioned into a modern country.

Chin Woo offered three foundational lessons as part of their course: Tan Tui, Gong Li Quan, and Jie Quan. These lessons also came with specially made instructional materials. Another major focus of Chin Woo was a distinctive style of boxing gymnastics that combined Chinese martial arts with Western style military drills that aimed to, "strengthen the body, the race, and the nation."

Along with Chinese martial arts, Chin Woo incorporated western sports into their programming. These included Western boxing as well as establishing a ball games department to facilitate tennis, soccer, volleyball, and table tennis. In addition to hosting friendly matches, Chin Woo also organized leagues for members of various sectors to participate in, for example in 1924 Chin Woo began the Shanghai Volleyball league which included representatives of Fudan University, Anglo-Chinese College, Pujian High School, Nanhua Academy, Lingnan Athletic Association, and Chin Woo.

== Bibliography ==
- Morris, Adam (2004). Marrow of the Nation: A History of Sport and Physical Culture in Republican China. The University of California Press. ISBN 0-520-24084-7.
- Kennedy, Brian; Elizabeth Guo (2005). Chinese Martial Arts Training Manuals: A Historical Survey. Berkeley, California: North AtlanticBooks. ISBN 1-55643-557-6.
- Kuo, Hsienwei, and Chinfang Kuo. 2023. “Bloodline Organization of Disseminating Chin Woo Athletic to Nanyang: From Cultural Matrix China to SEA.” The International Journal of the History of Sport. doi:10.1080/09523367.2023.2216653.
- Yandle, Robert (2010) 'Jingwu Athletic Association - 100 Years'. Beckett Media. Dallas, Texas (ISBN 978-189251535-3)
