= List of lei tai fighters =

Many martial artists have become famous lei tai fighters because of their successful matches upon the raised fighting stage. Others were already famous before facing lei tai challengers. This is a long, though not a definitive list, of many of them.

== Song dynasty ==
- Northern Praying Mantis founder Wang Lang (王朗) participated in a lei tai tournament, according to legend, where he was defeated by tongbeiquan (通揹) Master Han Tong (韩通) in the capital of Kaifeng. Master Lang shortly thereafter created his famous mantis fist.

== Qing dynasty ==
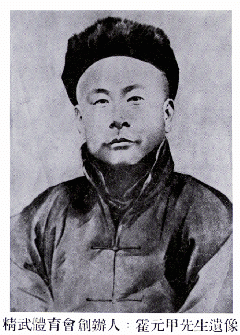
Huo Yuanjia

- Lama Pai Master Wong Yanlin set up his own lei tai platform in front of Hoi Tong Monastery in Guangdong after having worked as a famous bodyguard in Northern China. For 18 days, he fought 150 other martial artists and was never defeated. According to Hop Gar Grandmaster David Chin, "Either the challenger was maimed or killed. Wong never let one challenger leave his school without injury. He was a master of using the technique of cruelty." Shortly afterwards, he was elected as the leader of the Ten Tigers of Canton, who were the top ten kung fu men in Guangdong.
- Tiger-Crane Master Tee Ley was known for killing his opponents on the lei tai. But years after retiring from the martial world to become a cobbler, he accepted a challenge from a northern Chinese Master and killed him with a mix of Tiger-Crane and Iron palm techniques. He was a disciple of Chee See Tsek.
- Mizongyi Master Huo Yuanjia (c. 1867–1910) was the founder of the Chin Woo Athletic Association, a martial arts school in Shanghai. He is considered a hero in China for challenging foreign fighters in highly publicized matches at a time when Chinese sovereignty was being eroded by foreign concessions and spheres of influence.

== Republic of China ==
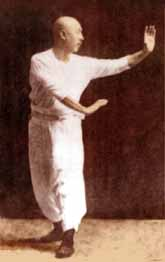
Chang Chan Kuei

- Internal martial arts Master Chang Chan-k'uei (1859–1940, Zhang Zhankui), also known as Chang Chao-tung (Zhang Zhaodong), made a name for himself on the lei tai by defeating several Japanese boxers and a German Strongman. He was also one of the eight famous students of Dong Haichuan, the founder of baguazhang.
- 17th generation Chen-style tai chi Master Chen Fake (1887–1957), became famous in his hometown of Chenjiagou for his victories upon the lei tai.
- Tai chi Praying Mantis Master Wang Yushan (王玉山) (1892–1976) ranked high in the 1933 Central Guoshu Institute lei tai competition and earned the martial nickname "Steel Hands and Iron Fists". He was one of the Laiyang Sanshan ("Three Mountains of Laiyang"), the three greatest Mantis boxers in Laiyang at the time.
- 18th generation Chen-style tai chi Master Chen Zhaopi (陈照丕) (1893–1972), Chen Fake's third nephew, was hired to guard the famous "Tong Ren Tang" (Le Brothers) pharmacy in Beijing in 1928. He kept a low profile by disguising himself as a street vender, wishing to avoid conflict with other martial artists. However, the scholar Li Qinlin (also from Henan province) wrote an unauthorized article in the Beijing Times newspaper describing the superiority of Chen-style tai chi to other styles in the area. In its conclusion, the article asked the masses who had not experienced Chen-style to "try it out" since a Chen master (Chen Zhaopi) was currently living in Beijing.

The local martial arts schools saw the article as a "challenge" and so Chen Zhaopi was urged to set up a lei tai by the Xuan Wu Men, one of the city's many gates. At first, challengers came one at a time, but eventually thronged to the lei tai in groups of threes and fives. Over the course of 17 days, he defeated over two hundred people and made many friends.

- Northern Shaolin Master Gu Ruzhang (1893–1952) placed in the "Top 15" (other sources say "Top 10") finishers in the 1928 Central Guoshu Institute lei tai competition. He was famously known as "Iron Palm Gu Ruzhang".
- Plum Blossom Praying Mantis Master Li Kun Shan (1894–1976) won the weapons portion of the 1933 Central Guoshu Institute lei tai competition using the long spear. He was one of the Laiyang Sanshan ("Three Mountains of Laiyang"), the three greatest Mantis boxers in Laiyang at the time.
- Flying Dragon Tiger Gate Master Leung Tian Chiu was 55 years old when he won 2nd place in the 1928 Central Guoshu Institute lei tai competition. He went on to create his own martial arts styles called Fut Gar Kuen ("Buddhist Fist Boxing") and Sae Ying Diu Sao ("Snake Form Mongoose Hands"), which was featured in an old Jackie Chan movie.
- Seven Star Praying Mantis Master Ma Chengxin (馬成鑫) won the grand championship of lei tai at the national Chinese boxing competition in 1929. Ma was a student of famed Mantis boxer Luo Guangyu (羅光玉), who later taught his style at the Chin Woo Athletic Association.
- Xinyi liuhe Master Shang Xueli won the lei tai competition in Kaifeng where he used a combination of "Back Power" (Bei Jin) and knee strike (Ti Xi) defeating Shaolin expert, Zhang Qilin (who died a few days later of internal injury). He was the disciple of Mai Zhuangtu (1829–1892) and Yuan Fengyi, master of Grandmaster Lu Songgao (卢嵩高) (died 1962).
- Zhaobao tai chi Master Zheng Boying (鄭伯英) (1904–1961) became famous after winning the 1931 lei tai competition held in Kaifeng.
- Xingyi Master Xin Jianhou won a lei tai contest in 1931. He was one of the earliest disciples of Shang Yunxiang (1864–1937), who was a disciple of Guo Yunshen.
- Shuai Jiao Master Chang Dongsheng (1908–1986) won the heavy weight division of the 1933 Central Guoshu Institute lei tai competition and earned the martial nickname "Flying Butterfly";

== People's Republic of China ==
- Hui-Muslim Grandmaster Ma Xianda (1932–2013) defeated tongbei master Deng Hongzhao and chuojiao master Li Xuewen to win the lei tai championship of 1952. Ma is the youngest of the four living top-ranking masters in China. He is considered a "National Treasure in Wushu".
- Internal martial arts Master Su Dongchen (1953–present) participated in lei tai bouts throughout the late 1960s and early 1970s as a teenager. He was known as the "Gifted child of Lei tai".
- Sanshou boxer Cung Le (1972–present), the current 2008 Strikeforce Middleweight MMA Champion, made a name for himself upon the lei tai before going professional. Le was awarded the "most famous Vietnamese Martial Artist in the world" title at the 2004 Asia Entertainment Awards in Los Angeles.

If the examples of Wong Yanlin and Chen Zhaopi are used, it took anywhere from 17 to 18 days and at least 150–200 consecutive wins in order for a fighter, who set up his own lei tai, to establish his style's dominance in that area.

== See also ==
- Media about lei tai
