= Louis Linn =

Martial artist teaching in Sweden

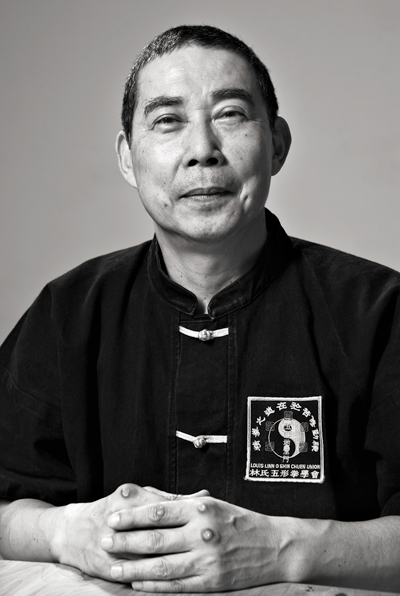
Portrait of Louis Linn

Louis Linn (林瑞耀, born in 1947) is a martial artist, teaching his family style of O Shin Chuen (Chinese: 五形拳; pinyin: wuxingquan), a traditional five-animal Fujian Shaolin style, in Sweden. He is credited with introducing Chinese martial arts, referred to as Wushu (popularly known as kung fu), to Sweden in 1975, after which he soon became a well known instructor within the martial arts society there.

He was commissioned to teach hand-to-hand combat to the officers at Kustjägarskolan (Coastal Rangers in English), the Swedish amphibious special forces, which he did 1979–1983 for which he was awarded the coastal ranger's statuette (the 12th person to receive this award since 1956). From 1982 to 1985, he taught Stockholmspolisens särskilda insatsstyrka, the Counter Terrorist Unit of the Stockholm Police Force. From 1978 to 1983, Linn taught Wushu at The Royal Opera, and later, the Stockholm International School (1997–1998).

In 1979, he established the Swedish Wushu Federation, and was one of the main people in founding the European Wushu Federation in 1985 and the International Wushu Federation in 1990. Later, in 2004, he took part in founding the European Shuai Jiao Union.

Today he is still active as the chief instructor of Louis Linn O Shin Chuen Union, an organization he founded in 1977 to promote O Shin Chuen.

== Before arriving to Sweden ==
Louis Linn was born in Tokyo and grew up in Taipei where he, as a child, came in contact with martial arts in school and through family members. After his military service in the Special Forces, Linn started his own martial arts school in Taipei, and got involved in the film industry in Taiwan and Hong Kong becoming a known movie actor. After a brief career in film, he decided to abandon film to devote himself to teaching and developing O Shin Chuen.

== Studies of martial arts and literature ==
Linn learned the family's O Shin Chuen style of martial arts at the age of 7 from Master Lim Tsua (林泉). In his teenage years, he began studying shuai jiao (Chinese wrestling) under the famous Grandmaster Chang Dongsheng. He also studied tai chi under Professor Wang Tsao Rong (王超人), along with Chinese literature and poetry with Professor Tien Lung (田龍).

== Establishing Wushu ==
In an interview in 2005, Fighter Magazine, the leading Scandinavian martial arts magazine, wrote: "The denomination a living legend has become somewhat of a cliché used at all times. When it comes to Sifu Louis Linn, born 1947, however, it is justified. Sifu Linn was the one who introduced wushu, Chinese martial arts, to Sweden 30 years ago.".

The first performance for Chinese martial arts in Sweden was performed by Linn at the Karate Gala in Eriksdalshallen in Stockholm on September 8, 1975. The same year, he created Stockholm Kung Fu Club which was later renamed Stockholms Wushu Akademi, the first Wushu/Kung Fu club in Sweden. Two years later, he founded the Louis Linn O Shin Chuen Union, an organization for the development of the style of O Shin Chuen. The organization grew rapidly, including members who are still within the organization today: Stockholm Wushu Akademi and in 1978 Skövde Wushu Förening. To further promote the development of Wushu, he founded the Swedish Wushu Federation in 1979.

At the Scandinavian weight-lifting championships in 1977, he pulled off a spectacular performance that got the attention of the Swedish television's sports program, Sportspegeln, when he ”broke bricks with his forehead [and] the five bricks just shattered!”. This was the first time that national television had broadcast any form of Asian martial arts.

Linn participated in the first preparatory meeting of the founding of an international Wushu federation in Hubei, 1984. The meeting was followed by a visiting group from the Chinese Wushu Association to Europe. This was the first time a group of ten Chinese Wushu experts visited Sweden, which included Cai Longyun (蔡龍雲), Su Zifang (蘇自芳) and Chen Chuanrui (陳傳瑞). The group performed in various places in Sweden, England and Italy as cooperation with the Chinese Wushu Association to promote Chinese Wushu in Europe.

The cooperation was the start of the founding of the European Wushu Federation in 1985, whereof Linn participated, representing the Swedish Wushu Federation. He served as vice president in the European Wushu Federation and as chairman in the technical committee from 1989 to 1991. He also played an active role in the founding of the International Wushu Federation in 1990.

To furthermore promote Wushu, Linn invited another group of Chinese Wushu experts to Sweden. Tai Chi Champion of the Asian Games Su Zifang and all-round Wushu champion Zhang Yuping (張玉萍; today Foreign Affairs Section Chief of Chinese Wushu Association), came to Sweden several times and stayed from three month up to a year to perform and teach standardized Wushu in Sweden between 1986 and 1990.

Linn's later contribution to the international arena has been to participate in the founding of the European Shuai Jiao Union in 2004, and currently is serving as vice president.

=== Guest instructor ===
Many various organizations have invited Linn to be a guest instructor, ranging from schools to the military.

He served as guest instructor at the Royal Opera (Kungliga Operan) in Stockholm between 1978 and 1983, teaching O Shin Chuen, and also at the Stockholm International School between 1997 and 1998.

In 1979–1983, he was commissioned to teach hand-to-hand combat to the officers at Kustjägarskolan (known as Coastal Rangers in English, the Swedish amphibious special forces). For his outstanding service, he was awarded the Coastal Ranger's green beret with the Neptune's trident and a wooden "ranger" statuette. He was the 12th person since 1956 to receive this award. What started as a trial for a couple of months, resulted in a contract for several years. His reputation as a qualified hand-to-hand combat instructor also lead him to be commissioned to teach close combat and anti-terrorist tactics at Stockholmspolisens särskilda insatsstyrka, the Counter Terrorist Unit of the Stockholm Police Force (1982–1985).

Other martial arts organizations outside of Sweden also invited Linn as guest instructor to their courses and camps. He taught at the Israeli Kyokushinkai Karate Federation in 1979. In 1989, he visited the Finland Karate Federation in Helsinki twice, first to teach a week-end course, and later, at their training camp.

Back in Sweden, Linn has been invited several times to teach at Soke Bo Munthe's Swedish Ninjutsu organization (1975–1993). Finally, the All Scandinavian Goju-Kai Karate-Do Federation invited Linn as guest instructor at their Fight Camp in Eskilstuna in 2009.

=== Referee ===
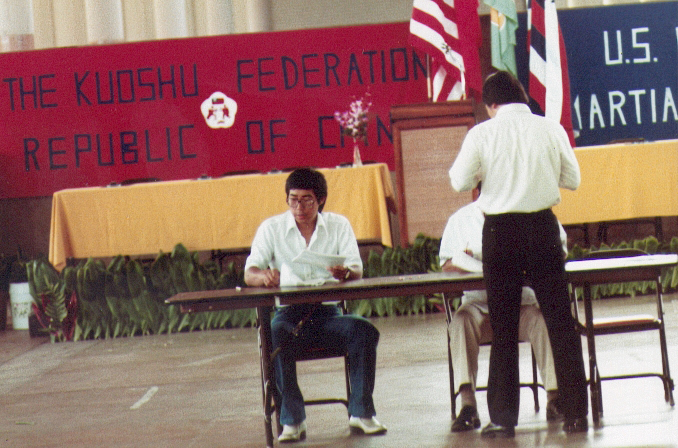
Louis Linn serves as the Chief Referee at the 3rd International Kuoshu Championships in Hawaii in 1980

Linn has served as chief referee at several international tournaments: the 3rd International Kuoshu Championships in Hawaii in 1980; the Italian Wushu Championships in Bologna 1984; the French Kung Fu Championships in Paris 1985; the 3rd European Wushu/Taolu Championships in Chieti 1989; the Shuai Jiao Championships at the 10th World Cup International Martial Arts Championship in Milan 2005; the 1st European Shuai Jiao Championship in Castellon 2005; the 2nd European Shuai Jiao Championship in Luton 2006; the 1st European Chinese Kuoshu Championship for Shuai Jiao and Lei Tai Sanda in Lugano 2008; and at the European Shuai Jiao Championship in Rome 2010.

The greatest referee position he has had was when he served as Deputy General Chief Referee at the 1st World Wushu Championships in Beijing 1991.

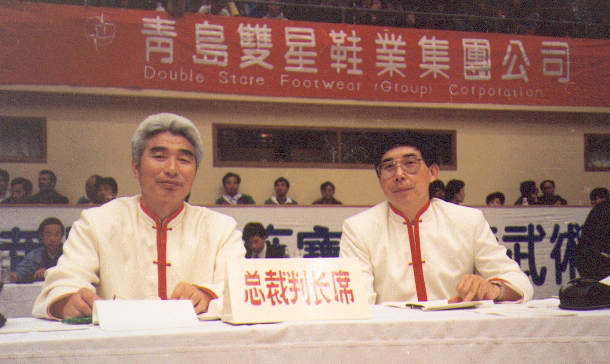
Louis Linn served as Deputy General Chief Referee at the 1st World Wushu Championships in Beijing 1991.

=== Hosting tournaments ===
The first international Wushu championship in Sweden was held in 1984, where an invited USA team (Daniel Kane Pai’s White Dragon Martial Arts Society) met with the Swedish national Wushu team. The year, after he hosted an international tournament in Sanda with teams from Sweden, Great Britain and France.

In 1989 he hosted the first European Wushu Championship in Sweden, the 3rd Wushu/Sanda Championship "[...] the largest ever gathering of its kind with the highest level in Europe.". The President of the European Wushu Federation, Ray Smith, was impressed by the arrangement and wrote in his appreciation letter to Linn that he had set a high standard for future European Wushu championships. Earlier that same year, Linn was both chief organizer and chief referee at the 3rd European Wushu/Taolu Championships in Chieti.

=== Training camps ===
Linn organized the first Swedish training camp in China in 1992 with participants from the Swedish Wushu Federation. He was interviewed by China Sport (the only sport magazine published in English by the Chinese sport association) and received the title “Father of Wushu in Sweden”.

He continued to organize training camps in 1993, 1995, 1997 and in 2002 with 65 participants. The Swedish training camps in China got the attention of the Chinese media with articles such as “Seeking Root – A Swedish Wushu Training Camp in Beijing.” and “Wushu vikings visit Beijing”.

== Awards ==
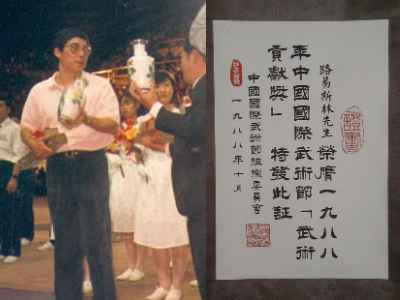
Louis Linn receives the Wushu contribution award (武術貢獻獎) at the International Free Sparring Invitational Tournament held in Shenzhen, China, from the Head Body of the Wushu Federation of the People's Republic of China in 1988.

Active in both tournaments and in establishing organizations, demonstrating his high competence as referee and organizer, Linn has received both great amounts of attention, and several awards during his years.

For his achievements in establishing Chinese Kung Fu in Europe, he received an award in 1978 from the president of the Judo Association of the Republic of China, M.C. Mao. As recognition of his competence, Linn was appointed advisor to the Tae Kwon Do committee by the Kuoshu committee at the 3rd congress of the Taipei Sport Association in 1976, and elected board member of and appointed advisor to the Kuoshu committee. In 1983, he was elected as vice president in the Kuoshu Worldwide Promotion Association.

One of the most prominent awards he received was the Wushu contribution award (武術貢獻獎) that he was awarded at the International Free Sparring Invitational Tournament held in Shenzhen, China, from the Head Body of the Wushu Federation of the People's Republic of China in 1988.

He has also received several letters of recommendations for his promotion and establishment of Wushu. From the Chinese Ambassador in Sweden, Mr. Tang Longbin, Linn received a letter of recommendation in 1993, and in 1995, he received an appreciation letter from Mr. Li Meng Hua, former president of All China Sports Federation, International Wushu Federation and the Chinese Olympic Committee.

== Film career ==
Louis Linn was contracted as the main actor in Gou Hua and Kai Fa Film Corporations and acted in seven films produced in Taiwan and Hong Kong between 1971 and 1973. One of his first films was “Winning Gate”, also known today as “Kings of Kung Fu”. Later films included “Dragon Brothers”.
