= Chang Tung-sheng =

Chang Tung-sheng may refer to:

- Zhang Dongsun, Chinese philosopher
- Chang Dongsheng, Chinese martial artist
