= 3rd Hong Kong Film Awards =

1984 Hong Kong Film Awards

- Date: 4 August 1984
- Hosted by: Chung King-fai

The 3rd Hong Kong Film Awards ceremony, honored the best films of 1983 and took place on 4 August 1984, at the Regent International Hotel, Hong Kong. The ceremony was hosted by Chung King-fai, during the ceremony awards are presented in 12 categories. The ceremony was sponsored by RTHK and City Entertainment Magazine.

== Awards ==
Winners are listed first, highlighted in boldface, and indicated with a double dagger (‡).

**Best Film**: **Peter Wang — Boon bin yen**‡; The Dead and the Deadly; Health Warning; Reign Behind a Curtain; Zu Warriors from the Magic Mountain	**Best Director**: **Allen Fong — Boon bin yen**‡; Li Han-Xiang — Reign Behind a Curtain; Wu Ma — The Dead and the Deadly; Teddy Robin — All the Wrong Spies; Kirk Wong — Health Warning
**Best Actor**: **Tony Leung — Reign Behind a Curtain**‡; Peter Wang — Boon bin yen; Alex Man — Hong Kong, Hong Kong; Sammo Hung — The Dead and the Deadly; Richard Ng — Winners and Sinners	**Best Actress**: **Cecilia Yip Tung — Let's Make Laugh**‡; Brigitte Lin — Zu Warriors from the Magic Mountain; Lau Hiu-Hing — Reign Behind a Curtain; Cherie Chung — Hong Kong, Hong Kong; Hui So-Ying — Boon bin yen
**Best New Performer**: **Carol Cheng — The Last Affair**‡; Hui So-Ying — Boon bin yen; Tony Leung — Reign Behind a Curtain; Max Mok Siu-Chung — Holy Flame of the Martial World; Yu Ka-Hei — I Do!	**Best Screenplay**: **Alfred Cheung — Let's Make Laugh**‡; Sammo Hung • Barry Wong — The Dead and the Deadly; Liu Wing-Leung — Health Warning; Si Yeung-Ping • Peter Wang — Boon bin yen; Li Han-Xiang • Yeung Chuen-Cham — Reign Behind a Curtain
**Best Cinematography**: **Bill Wong — The Last Affair**‡; Henry Chan • Kirk Wong • Rumjahn, Abdul Mohamed • Abdul Mohamed • Peter Ngor • Larry Shlu — Health Warning; Kwok Wah Koo — All the Wrong Spies; Lok-Yee Chan — Boon bin yen; Tong Bo-Sang • Yeung Lam — Reign Behind the Curtain	**Best Film Editing**: **Mok Leung Chau • Kam Wah Ng — Boon bin yen**‡; Peter Cheung — Duel to the Death; David Wu — Health Warning; Siu Fung Yu • Chung Yiu Ma • Cheuk Man Chiu — Am Kui; Yao Chung Chang — Zu Warriors from the Magic Mountain
**Best Art Direction**: **Hung Wing Sung — Reign Behind a Curtain**‡; Health Warning Art Group — Chung-Man Hai; Chung-Man Hai — All the Wrong Spies; William Chang — The Last Affair; William Chang — Zu Warriors from the Magic Mountain	**Best Action Direction**: **Yuen Biao • Lam Ching-Ying, Billy Chan — Winners and Sinners**‡; Corey Yuen — Zu Warriors from the Magic Mountain; Brandy Yuen • Yuen Sun-Yi — The Champions; Ching Siu-Tung — Duel to the Death; Sammo Hung • Yuen Biao • Lam Ching-Ying • Billy Chan — The Dead and the Deadly
**Best Original Film Score**: **Chi Yuen Chan • Lee Shou-chuan — Papa, Can You Hear Me Sing**‡; Jim Shum — Health Warning; Man Yee Lam — Boon bin yen; Chris Babida — All the Wrong Spies; Lam Man-Yi — Hong Kong, Hong Kong	**Best Original Film Song**: **Composer/Lyrics: Hau Tak-Kin • Singer: So Noi— Papa, Can You Hear Me Sing**‡; Composer: George Lam • Lyrics: Cheng Kwok-Kong Singer: George Lam — All the Wrong Spies; Composer: Kenny Bee • Lyrics: Lo Wing-Keung • Singer: Kenny Bee / Pang Kin-San — Let's Make Laugh; Composer: Sam Hui Koon-Kit • Singer: Sam Hui Koon-Kit — Aces Go Places 2; Composer: Chris Babida • Lyrics: Lam Chun-Keung • Singer: Chan Kit-Ling — Twinkle Twinkle Little Star

Nominee in 1984

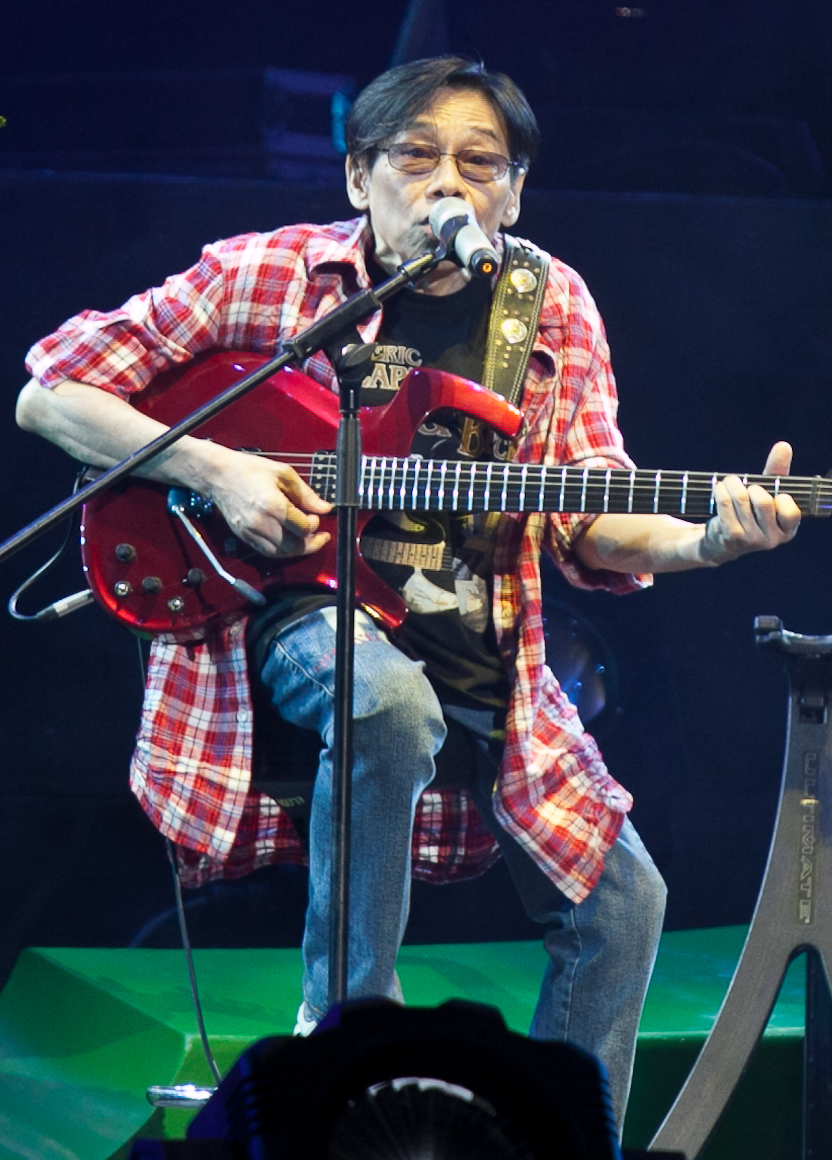
Teddy Robin, Best Director nominee

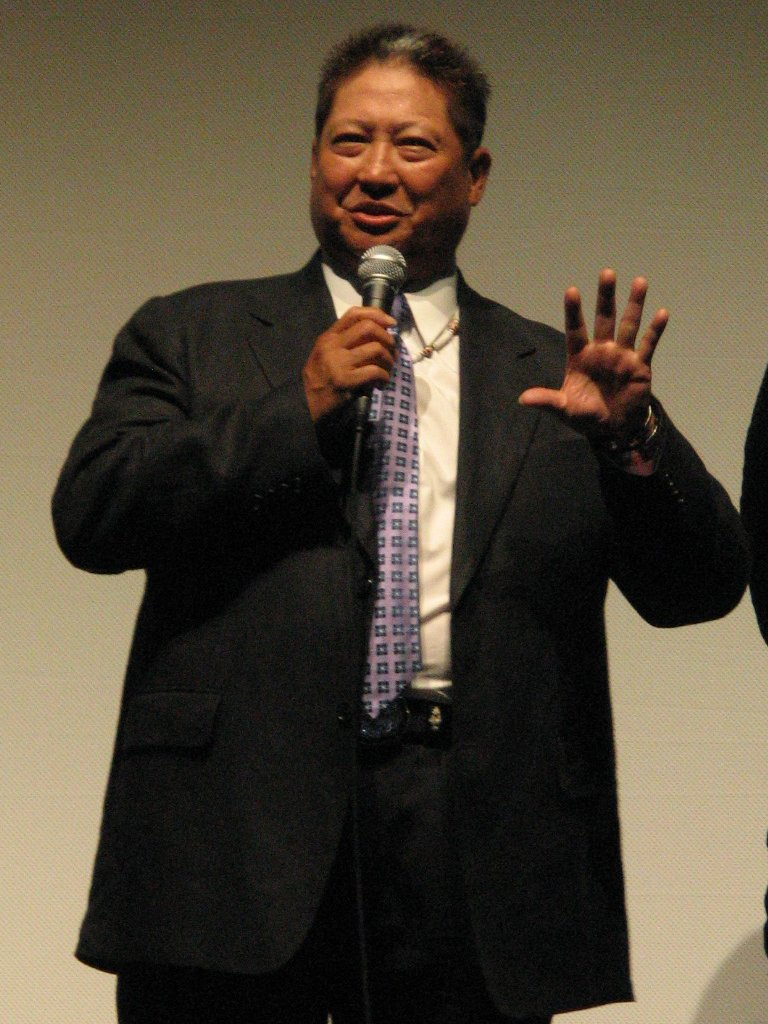
Sammo Hung, Best Actor nominee

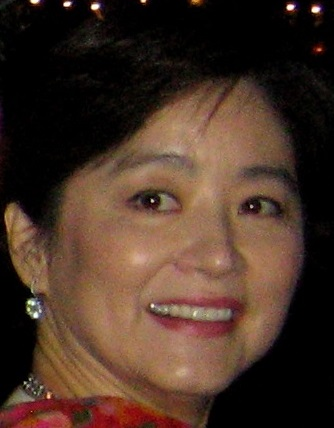
Brigitte Lin, Best Actress nominee

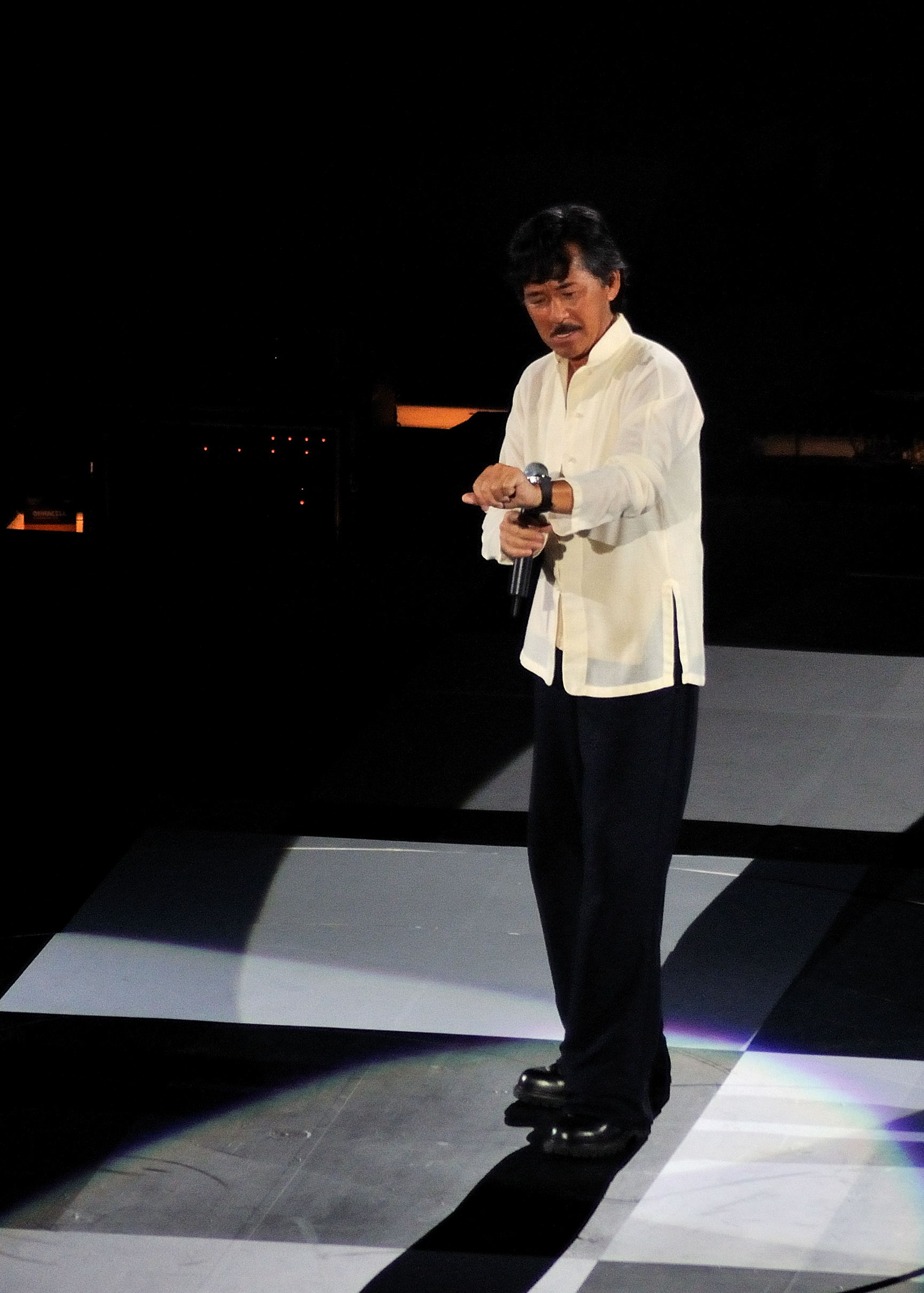
George Lam, Best Original Film Song nominee

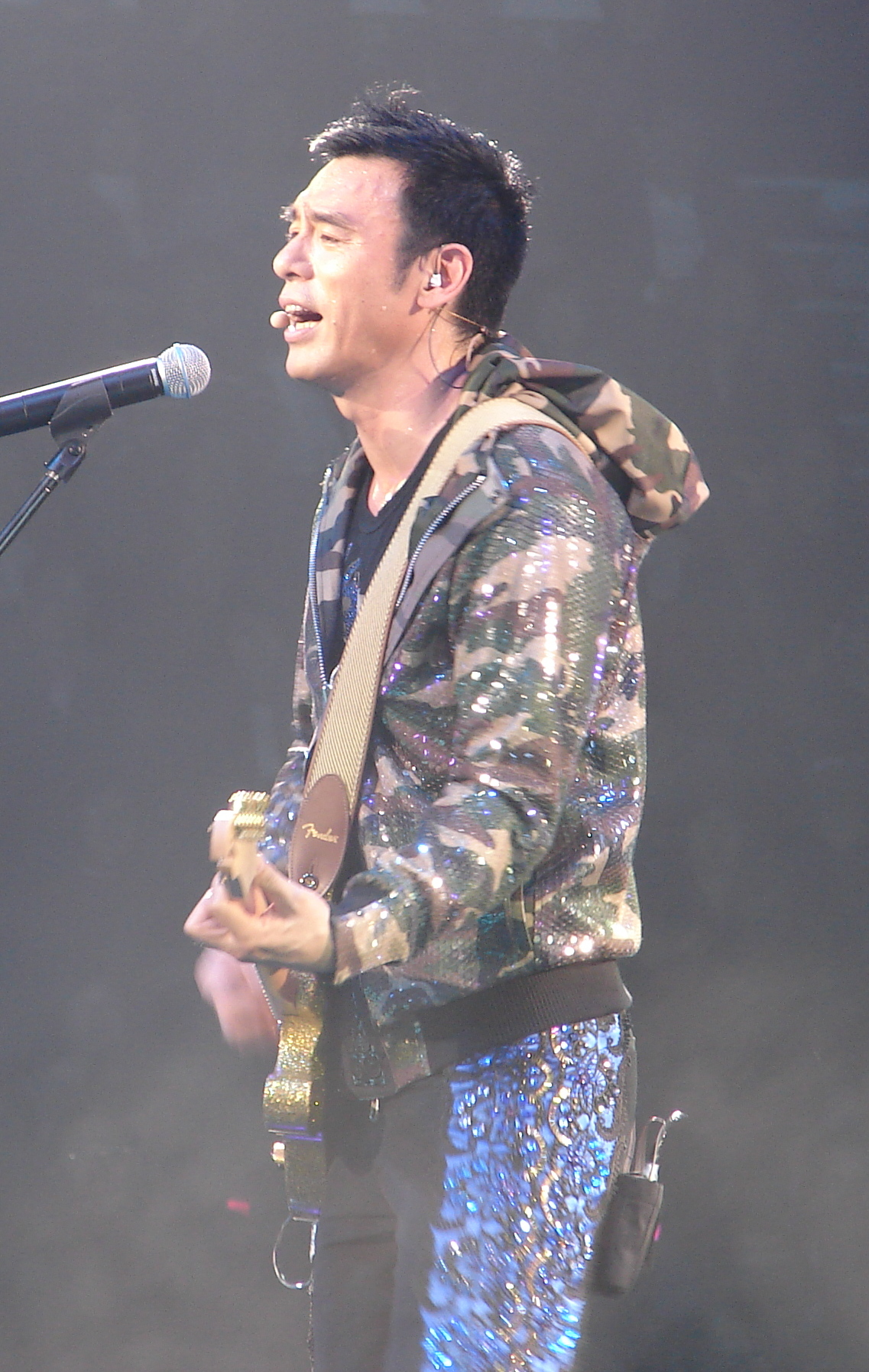
Kenny Bee, Best Original Film Song nominee
