= Media about lei tai =

The lei tai fighting stage has been the subject of various types of media; including Chinese film, video games, television, Literature, and music.

== Film ==
- Fearless (2006). This film was loosely based on the life of Huo Yuanjia, a legendary Chinese martial artist who challenged foreign fighters in highly publicised events. The first part of the film evolves around Huo Yuanjia's ego-driven challenges on the lei tai.

"Fong Sai-Yuk Challenges the Boxing-stage Champion" movie poster

- Extreme Kung Fu Qigong (1999). Kung Fu Magazine produced this 40 minute film from the Liqun Cup. (See Water lei tai) It shows various clips from the water bouts.
- Shy Spirit (羞羞鬼) (1988). This movie starred Lam Ching Ying as the “One Eyebrow Priest”. It has a long lei tai competition scene between rival kung fu schools.
- Bloodsport (1988). An American martial arts action film, starring Jean-Claude Van Damme, based on the claims martial artist Frank Dux. The Kumite tournament depicted in the film is held on a Lei Tai like platform. For the final round of the tournament, two ends of the platform are angled upwards creating a three-sectioned ring.
- Da Lei Tai (a.k.a. Da Lui Toi, Flash Future Kung Fu, Digital Master, or Health Warning) (1983). A dystopian sci-fi kung fu film set in the future. It was nominated for best picture in the 3rd Hong Kong Film Awards.
- Lei Tai (1972). This Hong Kong Cinema movie (also known under the English titles "Blood on the Sun" or "The Big Fight") involves a Lei Tai competition held by the occupying Japanese in World War II in order to cripple the local martial arts fighters to prevent them from joining the resistance.
- Huang Fei-hong lei tai zheng ba zhan (1960) (Huang Fei-hong's Combat in the Boxing Ring). This Hong Kong Cinema movie was a part of a long series starring Kwan Tak Hing as Hung Gar Master Wong Fei Hong.
- Huang Fei-hong lei tai dou san hu (1958) (Huang Fei-hong's Battle with the Bullies in the Boxing Ring). It starred Kwan Tak Hing.
- Huang Fei-hong lei tai bi wu (1956) (Huang Fei-hong at a Boxing Match). It starred Kwan Tak Hing.
- Ge Chang Fang Shi-Yu Da Lei Tai (歌唱方世玉打擂台 – Fong Sai-Yuk Challenges the Boxing-stage Champion) (1952). This was a black and white cantonese film about Shaolin Master Fong Sai-Yuk and his fight with a lei tai champion.
- Leitai Yingxiong (a.k.a. Hero of the Ring, Hu Huiqian Da Leitai, or Hu Huiqian Takes Up The Challenge) (1930). It was directed by Xu Zhong Xia and starred Gao Qian Pin and Ren Chao Jun.
- Fang Shiyu Da Leitai (Fang Shiyu Takes Up The Challenge) (1928). It was directed by Ren Peng Qian and starred Ding De Gui, Ren Chao Jun and Wang Yang Qiao. This is another film about Shaolin Master Fong Sai-Yuk.

"刀剑 Online" lei tai.

“吞食天地 ONLINE” lei tai

== Video games ==
- A role-playing video game known as "刀剑 Online" (Daojian Online) features a series of lei tai matches between characters. The game was developed by souhu.com. The large Chinese character 武 in the middle of the platform is Wu, which means "martial".
- Another game with a lei tai is “吞食天地 ONLINE” (Swallow Heaven and Earth Online). The original arcade version was better known as Dynasty Wars. The Chinese character on the large backdrop is also Wu (武).
- lei tais are featured in stages throughout the Soul series especially the water lei tais.
- In many Dragon Ball Video Games the world tournament ring which is a lei tai is featured.

== Television ==
Lei tai from "Earth Rumble VI"

- In “The Blind Bandit” episode of Avatar: The Last Airbender, Aang’s quest for an Earthbending teacher finds him watching “Earth Rumble VI”, a competition (and parody of Professional wrestling) between various earthbenders vying for the Championship belt. Instead of a ring, the competition is fought on a very large stone lei tai. Prior to the first round, the announcer, Xin Fu, explains the rules to the fighters, “The rules are simple. Just knock the other guy out of the ring and you win.” Aang wins the competition by knocking the “Blind Bandit” (Toph, a blind 12-year-old girl), the current champion, off of the lei tai with a huge gust of wind.
- Two characters from the 2006 television adaptation of the Wuxia novel The Return of the Condor Heroes share a supernatural-style bout on a lei tai surrounded by opposing military factions. They are able to disappear, run lightning quick and fly through the air almost as if being carried by the wind.
- In The Kung Fu Master (1994), Donnie Yen portrays legendary martial arts hero Hung Hei-Gun. When a rakish Manchu prince hires a supernaturally strong coolie to face a fellow suitor over the right to marry a certain girl, Hung steps in to fight in the suitor's stead. The battle takes place on a three-sided lei tai draped with a red cloth that reads "The Supreme Master in the world of martial arts". Despite the coolie's inhuman abilities, he lacks the Kung Fu training of which Hung is a master. Hung aims for a vital spot under the coolie's arm and then unleashes a series of kicks that sends his opponent flying from the stage.
- In the Dragon Ball series the World Martial Arts Tournament has a lei tai like platform however unlike the real lei tai there are rules such as anyone who comes into contact outside of the ring for more than ten seconds is knocked out thus declaring an automatic loss.

== Literature ==
- The description of the book Chinese Wushu Lei Tai Sanda Free Fighting (中国武术擂台散打) says “The popular form of free fighting often performed on a [lei tai] platform. This book has clear tracing style illustrations showing the major strikes and grapples, kicks and takedowns of the art. Also weight divisions, rules and other aspects of this sport are given."
- Toshio Nobe produced a 22 volume boxing manga series called Lei Tai Yi Pian Tian (擂台一片天 – “Challenge Days”).

== Music ==
According to the “Regional Attachments and Dialects in Chinese Music” chapter in the book Global Pop, Local Language, “[During] the Riyue Mountain Hua’er festival [in 1995]…Singers for outdoor staged concerts were selected by auditions, invitations, and/or a simple registration process. Most sang solo songs, but several concerts included a performance form called the 'Challenge arena' (leitai); this form resembles the dialogue singing of spontaneous events but with precomposed, rather than improvised, lyrics.”
