= Reign Behind a Curtain =

1983 Chinese-Hong Kong film by Li Han-hsiang

- Film poster
- 垂簾聽政
- Directed by: Li Han-hsiang
- Screenplay by: Yeung Cheun-ban; Li Han-hsiang
- Story by: Pak Wah
- Produced by: Chiu Wai; Li Han-hsiang
- Starring: Liu Xiaoqing; Tony Leung Ka-fai; Hong Kwan; Chan Wah; Wong Pui
- Narrated by: Fung Ming Yee
- Cinematography: Yeung Lam; Bob Thompson
- Edited by: Fong Sing; Chu Ka Ling
- Music by: Yip Shun Chi
- Distributed by: New Kwun Lun Film Production Co. Ltd.
- Release date: 20 October 1983 (Hong Kong)
- Running time: 102 minutes
- Countries: China; Hong Kong
- Languages: Mandarin Chinese; Cantonese

Reign Behind a Curtain (Chinese: 垂簾聽政) is a 1983 historical drama film directed by Li Han-hsiang. The sequel to The Burning of Imperial Palace, the film tells the story of Cixi's consolidation of power. It stars Liu Xiaoqing as Empress Dowager Cixi, Chan Wah as Empress Dowager Ci'an and Tony Leung Ka-fai as the Xianfeng Emperor. The film was nominated for eight awards at the 3rd Hong Kong Film Awards and won two. Tony Leung, who made his debut in The Burning of Imperial Palace, won the Best Actor Award.

== Plot ==
After the Anglo-French joint invasion and the destruction of the Yuanming Garden, the Xianfeng Emperor indulges in hunting at the Jehol Summer Resort and Prince Gong is becoming more influential in the Qing government through frequent negotiations and operations with foreign powers. Rumours have it that Prince Gong is planning a rebellion with foreign supports, but Noble Consort Yi often rebuts such claims before the Emperor.

The Emperor promotes a female court attendant as Consort Li, much to the dismay of members of the harem, especially Noble Consort Yi and the Empress. During the celebration of the Emperor's birthday, he suffers from hyperhidrosis and dizziness but refrains from interrupting the opera show. Nevertheless, the Empress summons the imperial doctors and halts the events, an act usually considered a taboo. Therefore, the senior ministers are alarmed about the Emperor's deteriorating health. When Sushun, the most trusted Imperial Consultant, visits the Emperor, he suggests that Noble Consort Yi should be executed before her son's succession to the throne, to prevent her from intervening with state affairs. His suggestion is rejected although the Emperor has been wary of Noble Consort Yi's ambition to overpower the Empress. Neither of them is unaware that Noble Consort Yi is overhearing their conversation.

The Emperor designates Noble Consort Yi's six year-old son Zaichun as his heir and appoints Sushun and seven other ministers as regents. When his health further deteriorates, he summons the Empress, Noble Consort Yi and the eight regents, telling them whoever disrespects the Empress after his death shall be executed. Afterward, the Emperor orders Noble Consort Yi to stay behind and gives her one of his jade seals as a symbol of authority to assist the Empress. On a thundery night, Consort Li is kidnapped when she is praying for the Emperor's longevity. The Xianfeng Emperor dies in the Summer Resort on the same night. Upon the accession of Zaichun to the throne, the Empress and Noble Consort Yi become empresses dowager with titles "Empress Dowager Ci'an" and "Empress Dowager Cixi".

The regency led by Sushun quickly adapts several policies, including the promulgation of the new era name Qixiang and issuance of new coinage. The empresses dowager insist that all imperial edicts must bear both empresses dowager's seals. Prince Gong, who comes from Peking to Jehol to pay tribute to the late Emperor, meets with the empresses dowager to discuss a coup to seize power. When a memorial to the throne argues for replacing the regency, the empresses dowager secretly hide it as they believe the time is not right. On the other hand, the regency rejects the empresses dowager's suggestion to appoint a teacher for the young emperor. Although Ci'an tries to avoid direct confrontations, Cixi maintains they must not give in. A fierce quarrel breaks out between the two parties until the Emperor is scared into tears.

Still holding the government, the regency secretly hires assassins against the empresses dowager on their way back to Peking, but their plan is foiled because of an undercover. When seven of the regents arrive in Peking, they are either imprisoned or expelled from the Grand Council by Prince Gong. Sushun, who is still escorting the late emperor's coffin, is arrested at night. As Sushan is beheaded at Caishikou, Duanhua is given a white silk cloth to hang himself and Zaiyuan is suffocated, the regency is dissolved.

Seeing her political enemies eliminated, Cixi goes to see Consort Li, who turns out to have been put in a large wine urn with her limbs chopped. Consort Li says she is now worry-free and mocks Cixi for being constantly paranoid and guilty. As the new emperor is enthroned, Ci'an and Cixi now reign behind a curtain and become the most powerful women in China. The narrator comments that Cixi's 48-year reign is a catastrophe to the state.

== Cast ==
- Liu Xiaoqing as Nobel Consort Yi, later Empress Dowager Cixi
- Tony Leung Ka-fai as the Xianfeng Emperor, Qing Emperor of China
- Chen Ye as the Empress, later Empress Dowager Ci'an
- Hong Kwan as Sushun, leader of the regency
- Zhang Tielin as Yixin, Prince Gong
- Wong Pui as Duanhua, member of the regency
- Chow Kit as Consort Li

== Awards and nominations ==
Award ceremony	Category	Recipients	Result
3rd Hong Kong Film Awards	Best Film	Reign Behind a Curtain	Nominated
3rd Hong Kong Film Awards	Best Director	Li Han-hsiang	Nominated
3rd Hong Kong Film Awards	Best Actor	Tony Leung Ka-fai	Won
3rd Hong Kong Film Awards	Best Actress	Lau Hiu-hing	Nominated
3rd Hong Kong Film Awards	Best New Performer	Tony Leung Ka-fai	Nominated
3rd Hong Kong Film Awards	Best Screenplay	Li Han-hsiang, Yeung Cheun-ban	Nominated
3rd Hong Kong Film Awards	Best Cinematography	Tong Bo-Sang.(Bob Thompson), Yeung Lam	Nominated
3rd Hong Kong Film Awards	Best Art Direction	Hung Wing Sung	Won
