= Lei tai =

Elevated fighting arena

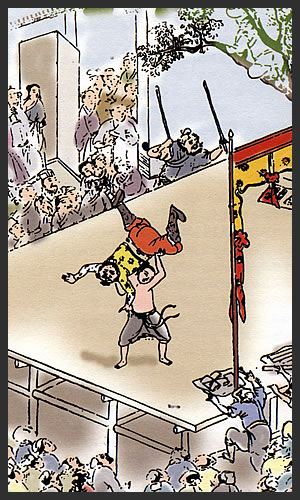
- A fighter preparing to throw his opponent from the lei tai
- Traditional Chinese: 擂臺
- Simplified Chinese: 擂台
- Literal meaning: striking platform
Transcriptions
Standard Mandarin
- Hanyu Pinyin: lèitái, léitái
Yue: Cantonese
- Jyutping: leoi4 toi4

The lei tai is an elevated fighting arena, without railings, where often fatal weapons and bare-knuckle martial arts tournaments were once held. "Sanctioned" matches were presided over by a referee on the platform and judges on the sides. Participants would lose if they surrendered, were incapacitated, or were thrown or otherwise forced from the stage. The winner would remain on the stage (as its "owner") unless ousted by a stronger opponent. If there were no more challengers, they would become the champion. Private duels on the stage had no rules and were sometimes fought to the death.

The lei tai first appeared in ancient China, and in its present form during the Song dynasty. However, ancient variations of it can be traced back to at least the Qin dynasty. Today it is used in Sanshou and Kuoshu competitions throughout the world.

== Etymology ==
According to Kung Fu Magazine, the Chinese character '擂' (in Mandarin lèi or léi) combines the word for "thunder" (léi 雷) with the radical for "hand" (shǒu 手). It can mean "to give an open challenge." But taken literally, it means to "beat (a drum)". Tái means "stage" or "platform." It is also commonly referred to as a Dǎ lèi tái (Traditional: 打擂臺 Simplified: 打擂台 – "Fight Beat (a drum) Platform"). The character for Dǎ combines the word for "robust or vigorous" (dīng 丁) with the radical for "hand" (shǒu 手). This can mean "to strike, hit, beat, or fight". In Cantonese, using the Wade-Giles superscript number system, Lei tai is pronounced Leui^{4} Toi^{4}. A common English rendering of this is "Lui Toi or Loey Toy". Da lei tai is pronounced Da^{1} leui^{4} toi^{4} or Da^{2} leui^{4} toi^{4}.

The Chinese military once used a Zhong Jun Lei Gu Tai (中军擂鼓台 – "Central Military Drum Beating Platform") to drum out commands on the battlefield and to tell time in the capital city. (see Gulou and Zhonglou) Three Kingdoms general Zhang Fei used a "drum beating platform" to teach his soldiers troop movements. It is possible that the lei tai received its name from this type of platform, since a superior fighter might "beat" his opponent like a drum.

== Dimensions ==
The fighting area is square, but its exact size varies from source to source.

- The Swiss Open Kusohu Tournament states the classical lei tai fights took place on a stage at least 2.5 meters high and had a four-sided area of 100 square meters.
- The Tien Shan Pai Association states it was either 24 x 24 feet (7.3 m) or 30 x 30 feet (9.1 m) and 2–4 feet (1.2 m) high.
- The International Wushu Federation and Chinese Wushu Association commissions a lei tai which is 24 x 24 feet (7.3 m) and 2 feet (0.61 m) high. The surrounding mats are 6 feet (1.8 m) long and 1-foot (0.30 m) thick. It is called the "Nine Suns Mountain Sanda Lei tai". It was used in the 8th World Wushu Championships held in Vietnam in December 2005.
- The International Chinese Kuoshu Federation uses a stage 24 x 24 feet (7.3 m) and 16 inches (410 mm) high.
- According to the book Chinese Fast Wrestling for Fighting: The Art of San Shou Kuai Jiao Throws, Takedowns, & Ground-Fighting, it was 24 x 24 feet (7.3 m) and 5 feet (1.5 m) high.
- The World Sports Encyclopedia says it is "an 8x8m platform...elevated approx. 6 m and surrounded by rubber walls."

== History (prior to 1928) ==
In ancient China, combat sport appeared in the form of Leitai, a no-holds-barred mixed combat sport that combined Chinese martial arts, boxing and wrestling. Lei tai in its present form appeared during the Song dynasty when it was used for boxing and Shuai Jiao exhibition matches and private duels. According to the Chinese Kuoshu Institute (UK), an ancestor of the lei tai was used during the Qin dynasty to hold Jiao Li wrestling competitions between imperial soldiers. The winner would be chosen to act as a bodyguard to the emperor or a martial arts instructor for the Imperial Military.

According to Cung Le, a famous mixed martial arts fighter, "In the old days, if you wanted to announce yourself as a boxer in a new village, you built a lei tai, stood on it, and invited all comers to try and knock you off." Some fighters issued their challenge in the form of a handwritten letter to the person they wished to face. This form of challenge was illustrated in the movie Fearless, when Jet Li's character challenges another warrior to a fight. The book Ultimate Sparring: Principles & Practices comments, "martial artists conducted 'Challenge matches' [on the lei tai] to test each other's skills, because of a personal dispute, or to prove one martial system's superiority over another system." Either fighter lost the match and his credibility if he fell, was forced off or was knocked to the floor of the stage. As a result, no one would want to learn boxing from him. The winner of the bout became the "owner of the platform" and remained on stage unless he was forced off himself. If there were no more challengers, he became the champion, establishing the dominance of his style in that area. Another way was to defeat an already established master on the lei tai and then take over his school.

In order to become a champion, a fighter had to defeat countless opponents. For instance, Lama Pai Grandmaster Wong Yan-Lam set up his own lei tai platform in front of Hai Tung Monastery in Guangdong after having worked as a famous bodyguard in Northern China. For 18 days, he fought over 150 other martial artists and was never defeated. According to Hop Gar Grandmaster David Chin, "Either the challenger was maimed or killed. Wong never let one challenger leave his school without injury. He was a master of using the technique of cruelty." Shortly afterwards, he was elected as the leader of the Ten Tigers of Canton, who were the top ten kung fu men in Guangdong. Eighteenth generation Chen-style tai chi Grandmaster Chen Zhaopi, third nephew of Chen Fake, set up a platform by Beijing's "Xuan Wu Men" city gate after an unauthorized article claiming the superiority of Chen-style tai chi appeared in the Beijing Times, causing many martial artists to challenge his skills. Over the course of 17 days, he defeated over 200 people and made many friends. If these examples are followed, it took a fighter anywhere from 17 to 18 days and 150–200 plus consecutive wins to establish their style's dominance in that area.

All weapons and boxing matches were conducted without protective gear like the Jissen Kumite (full-contact fighting) of Kyokushin Karate. On top of being forced from or thrown to the floor of the stage, the fights sometimes continued until either boxer conceded defeat, was severely injured and could no longer fight, or was even killed. One example of a death on stage was described by Hung Gar Grandmaster Chiu Kow (1895–1995), father of Grandmaster Chiu Chi Ling. The fight took place between Hung Gar Master Leng Cai Yuk and a triad boss named Ha Saan fu, who was also a master of internal martial arts. Because Ha dealt in prostitution, gambling, and drugs, Leng challenged Ha to a lei tai bout to halt the expansion of his criminal territory. Ha accepted the challenge and agreed to leave the area if he lost.

Ha had previously heard of Master Leng's ability to tear at the flesh of his opponents with his bare hands, so he wrapped his torso with a leather strap prior to the fight. Both men met on the lei tai some time later and signed a contract that stated the fight could end in death. The crowd watched as both initiated combat. After a few moments, Leng (apparently seeing the leather straps through his ripped clothing) bypassed Ha's armor by forcing his hand down from the top of the wrap and tore out the triad boss' bowels. When Ha fell dead to the stage, his men tried attacking Leng to exact revenge, but the local police quickly arrested Leng to protect him. He was eventually set free.

However, the railless architecture of the lei tai allowed a fighter to escape serious injury if they faced a more powerful opponent. All they had to do was leap down from the stage. This constituted a loss, but the boxer lived to fight another day. Despite this option, the Nationalist government banned the old traditions of private duels on the lei tai in 1928 because too many people were dying.

== Modern day (1928 to present) ==
=== National boxing competitions ===
In order to screen the best practitioners for teaching positions at the newly founded Central Guoshu Institute, and in the provincial schools, Generals Zhang Zhi Jiang (张之江) (1882–1966), Li Liejun (1882–1946) and Li Jinglin (1885–1931) held the first modern full contact, national competition in October 1928. Many traditional masters did not compete because they believed their skills could only be proven in serious duels and not "sporting" contests. However, the event attracted hundreds of the best Chinese martial artists who participated in boxing, weapons and wrestling in a lei tai ring format. But after the first several days, the fighting competitions had to be halted because two masters were killed and many more seriously injured. The final 12 contestants were not permitted to continue for fear of killing off some of the greatest masters of the time. The overall winner was voted on by a jury of his peers. Many of the "Top 15" finishers (some being Xingyi boxers) went on to teach at the institute.

In 1929, the governor of Guangdong Province invited some of the institute's masters (including some of those that had competed in the 1928 lei tai) to come south to establish a "Southern Kuoshu Institute". General Li Jinglin chose five masters to represent northern China. These men were known as the Wu hu xia jiangnan (五虎下江南 – "Five tigers heading south of Jiangnan"):

- Gu Ruzhang (1893–1952) of Northern Shaolin style. He was famously known as "Iron Palm Gu Ruzhang". He placed in the "Top 15" of the 1928 lei tai;
- Wan Laisheng (1903–1995) of Northern Shaolin and Internal styles (including Natural Boxing);
- Fu Zhensong (1881–1953) of Baguazhang style;
- Wang Shaozhou (王绍周) of Northern Shaolin and Cha styles and
- Li Xianwu of Northern Shaolin and Internal styles.

In 1933, the institute again hosted the national competition. The rules said, "...if death occurs as a result of boxing injuries and fights, the coffin with a body of the deceased will be sent home." Winners of this contest include:

- Chang Dongsheng (1908–1986) of Shuai Jiao style. He won the heavy weight division and earned the martial nickname "Flying Butterfly";
- Wang Yushan (王玉山) (1892–1976) of Taichi Praying Mantis style and
- Li Kunshan (1894–1976) of Plum Blossom Praying Mantis style.

=== Kuoshu (lei tai full-contact fighting) ===
Differing mainly in regulations, such as Kuoshu's allowing competitors to strike the same place twice, kuoshu and sanshou are examples of how popular the overall concept of full-contact kung fu has become. Though a few see a stringent dividing line between the sports, some such as Anthony Goh, president of the United States of America Wushu Kungfu Federation, see less contrast. "The rules will always be slightly different," says Goh, but "the various names all mean the same thing."

Others see the distinction as primarily historical. Huang Chien Liang, president of the United States Kuoshu Federation and The World Kuoshu Federation, notes that "Kuoshu has another meaning as 'national art.' In 1928, the Central Kuoshu Academy was formed, and they sponsored a full-contact tournament, but when the Chinese Communist Party took over China, the Nationalist government moved to Taiwan, where, in 1955, they held a full-contact tournament, calling it lei tai. At that time, they used the original rules; no protection, and no weight class – whatever number you picked up, you fought together.

In 1975, Taiwan sponsored the first World Kuoshu Championship Tournament, and started to have weight class division. The second tournament also took place in Taiwan and was won by Peter Ralston, the first non-Asian to do so. The current president of the United States Kuo Shou Federation Huang Chien-Liang brought six of his students as a team to the 3rd World Kuoshu Championship tournament in Hawaii in 1980. This world tournament, sponsored and organized by an international Kuoshu federation in Taiwan, featured top Chinese stylists from around the world. Although they were nervous about the competition, Huang's students performed surprisingly well. They captured top placing in several divisions, including forms and full contact fighting. In total, they took home six trophies. In 1986, Huang assembled another team to participate in the 5th World Kuoshu Championship. Huang served as Head Coach of the U.S. team. The 6th Championship took place in 1989 So by 1992, Taiwan had already sponsored seven Kuoshu lei tai fighting events.

Meanwhile, in China, "Kuoshu had been oppressed during the Cultural Revolution," notes president Huang, "and martial arts was then allowed only for performance until 1979, when wushu was allowed to include self-defense, so practitioners began writing the rules for the Sanshou Wushu tournaments, and the Communist government held a tournament called Sanshou."

Confirming the common direction of Kuoshu and Sanshou toward safety, however, president Huang approves of the rules changes in full-contact kung fu. "In 1986, at the fifth world tournament in Taiwan, they had a separate weight class, but still no protection. So many people suffered a broken nose and other injuries." As a result, the International Kuoshu Federation decided to change the rules. "So since 1988, the new rules apply."

=== Sanshou / Sanda ===
As previously stated, martial arts were only allowed for performance purposes until 1979. But in March of that year, the Zhejiang Provincial Sports Training Center, Beijing Physical Education University (former Beijing Physical Education Institute), and Wuhan Physical Education College were convened by the government-appointed China National Sport Committee (CNSC) to transform Sanshou into a competitive sport. By October, the first three Sanshou teams were created from fighters chosen from the aforementioned wushu colleges. Even more teams were gathered in May 1980.

The first official Sanshou rules were drafted in January 1982 when the CNSC convened the National Sanshou Competition Rules Conference in Beijing. Six teams consisting of the Shandong, Hebei and Guangdong provincial teams, the Beijing Physical Education University and City teams and the Wuhan Physical Education College team were summoned to the conference to help formulate the regulations and points system of the sport. Ten months later, the very first Sanshou competition was held in November 1982. The original fighting area was a nine-meter diameter open circle, but it was later changed to a traditional square lei tai.

According to Shuai Jiao Grandmaster Liang Shou Yu, "In the past, San Shou competition was held on the Lei Tai, a 24 x 24-foot (7.3 m) platform 5 feet (1.5 m) high. Victory was decided when an opponent was thrown off the Lei Tai or knocked to the floor. Therefore, Shuai Jiao is an important part of San Shou fighting. A martial artist without any Shuai Jiao skills would not easily survive a San Shou match."

Kung Fu Magazine states just throwing someone off the lei tai in a Sanshou match is 3 points, which is "the [points] equivalent of a spinning hook kick to the head, or a perfect foot sweep."

(For Kuoshu and Sanshou competition rules, see "Rule Books" in External links below.)

=== Water lei tai ===
The city of Taizhou, Zhejiang hosted the first "On Water Contest of the 'Liqun Cup' International Traditional Wushu and Unique Feats Tournament" from May 22–26, 1999. It was here that 24 countries and 28 Chinese national teams, over a thousand competitors in all, gathered to test their skills against each other.

The water lei tai was held on the afternoon of the second day of competition (May 23). There were five divisions and it was the most attended event of the tournament. The event was made more difficult when it rained just prior to the matches, making the fighting surface very slippery. Also fighters were restricted to minimal safety equipment, only gloves and shorts. The defeated, who fell or was forced off the stage, landed in water. To improve safety, the lei tai was a meter shorter than a standard one, which lessened the impact and allowed assistants to quickly jump in the pool to rescue any fighter who might have been unconscious. No serious injuries were recorded during this event.

There have been more water lei tai's held since this event. In March 2004, the 9th International Chinese Kuoshu Federation (ICKF) World Championship hosted the 3rd water lei tai. The tournament venue was Aquatic Training Centre, Tainan Canal, Tainan, Taiwan. This was the first International event hosted by the ICKF to be held entirely on water.

=== Strategy ===
Kung Fu Magazine states the lei tai's railless architecture does not allow a fighter to trap an opponent in the turnbuckle, so the fighting strategy shifts away from power boxing to more evasive "circling" maneuvers. Nor can a fighter just rush their adversary. A quick redirection will send a charging opponent off the stage. And falling off can hurt, so fighters must deal with an added psychological factor when they approach the edge. Like Japanese sumo, a fighter must stand their ground. Falling out-of-bounds constitutes a loss.

=== Sparring benefits ===
According to the Swiss Open Kusohu Tournament, lei tai permits the kung fu student to show their understanding of the techniques, moves, rooting, breathing and control of character (i.e. anger). Kung fu together with lei tai trains the instincts and timing. It cultivates concentration and relaxation at the same time. It teaches practical combat applications of the disconnected moves learned from sets or taolu ("Forms"). With lei tai a student receives personal feedback on their strengths and weaknesses.

== See also ==
- List of famous lei tai fighters
- Dojoyaburi
- History of physical training and fitness
- Media about lei tai
- Mixed martial arts
- Pankration
