= Jacket wrestling =

Sport

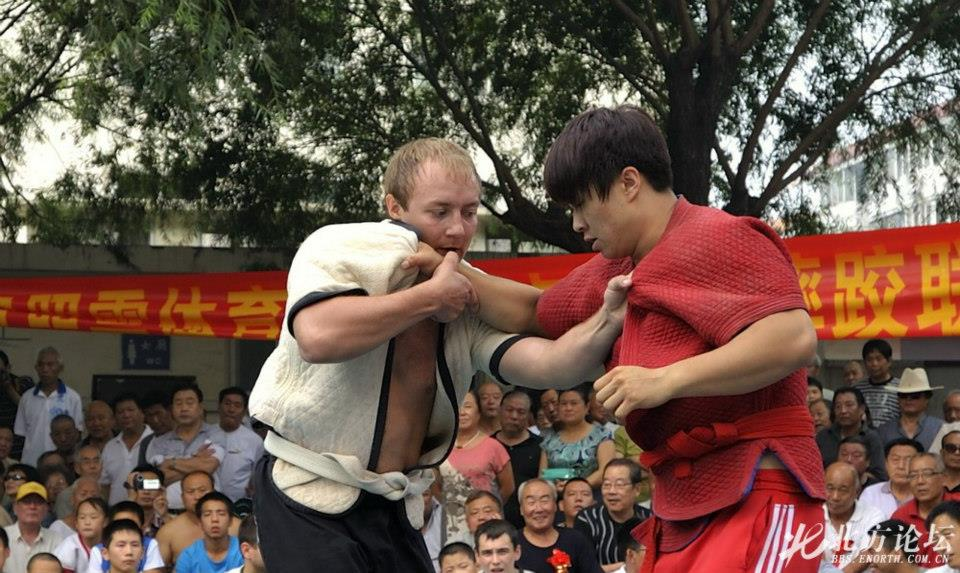
A Shuai jiao match in China

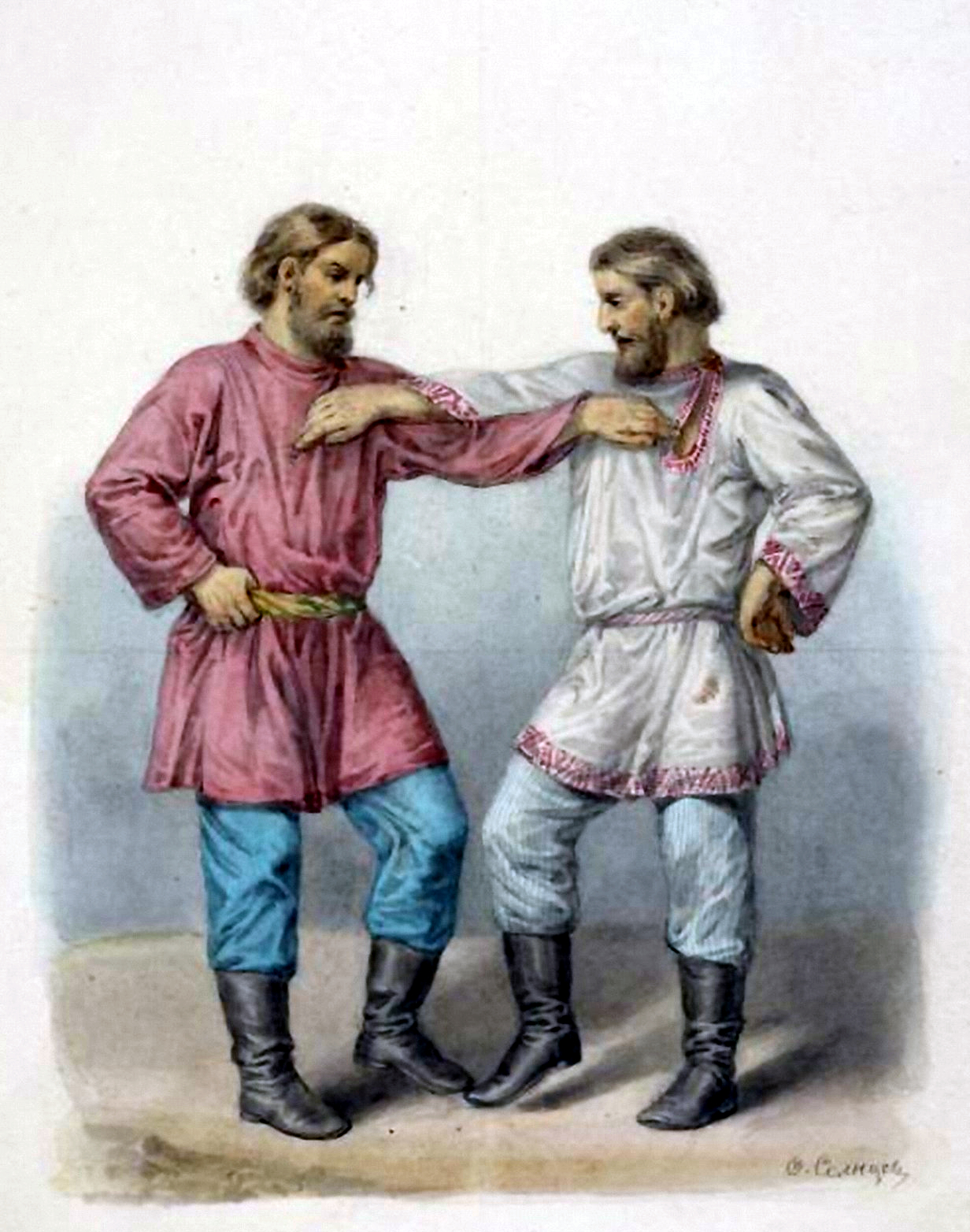
Za-vorotok folk wrestling, a single-handed variant of the sport, practised by the Slavic peoples

Jacket wrestling is a form of wrestling and one of the oldest form of sports that has been practiced in both Europe and Asia going back many centuries. It generally involves two contestants wearing jackets and belts attempting to take each other down in order to pin their opponent. The method of combat has also been referred to as "belt-and-jacket wrestling", for its common use of a belt or sash in addition to or instead of a jacket.

The two most popular contested styles of jacket wrestling today are Judo and Sambo.

== History ==
Encyclopædia Britannica has stated that, "The three basic types of wrestling contest are the belt-and-jacket, catch-hold, and loose styles, all of which appear to have originated in antiquity. Belt-and-jacket styles of wrestling are those in which the clothing of the wrestlers provides the principal means of taking a grip on the opponent."

Thomas A. Green and Joseph R. Svinth stated in 2010 that, it has been recorded as a method of combat as early as the Middle Ages. Scot Beekman stated in 2006 that, Jacket wrestling became especially popular in Britain, where different regions developed their own forms of jacket wrestling rules and combat.

Celtic jacket wrestling styles (Cornish wrestling, Brollaidheacht and Gouren) claim a common origin with references in the ancient book of Leinster, referring to the sport being included in the Tailteann Games which date back to c1829 BC. Wrestling was featured in 1139’s Historia Regum Britanniae, in which Geoffrey of Monmouth suggested that Corineus, the medieval legend, wrestled a Cornish giant named Gogmagog at Plymouth Hoe.

== See also ==
- Belt wrestling
- Cornish wrestling
