= Health Warning =

1983 Hong Kong film by Kirk Wong

Health Warning 打擂台
- Film poster
- Directed by: Kirk Wong
- Written by: Liu Wing-Leung
- Produced by: Ringo Lai Chuen Wong
- Starring: Eddy Ko; Kwok Wai-keung; Ray Lui
- Cinematography: Yuen Chi Siu
- Edited by: David Wu
- Music by: Jim Sam Sing-Tak
- Production companies: Bang Bang Film Productions; Verdull Film Dept.
- Release date: 21 October 1983 (Hong Kong)
- Running time: 78 minutes
- Country: Hong Kong
- Languages: Cantonese; Mandarin

Health Warning (Chinese: 打擂台; pinyin: Da Lei Tai) (alternative titles: Flash Future Kung Fu or Digital Master) is a 1983 Hong Kong film directed by Kirk Wong. It is a dystopian sci-fi kung fu film set in the future.

== Cast and roles ==
- Eddy Ko - The Master
- Kwok Wai-keung
- Ray Lui - Gei
- Mak Wai Cheung
- San Guai
- Elvis Tsui - Tall skinhead fighter
- Wang Lung Wei - Killer
- Yuen Tin Wan
- Lee Kwan-Young - Boss of Nazis / Killer's last opponent in finale fight scene (uncredited)

== Awards ==
At the 3rd Hong Kong Film Awards, Health Warning was nominated for Best Picture, and Kirk Wong was nominated for Best Director. The film was listed as one of the "Best 100 Chinese Motion Pictures" during the 24th Hong Kong Film Awards.

== See also ==
- Media about lei tai
