= Billy Chan =

Australian medical simulation expert (born 1960)

Sir Billy Chan KGOR, KSJ
- Born: December 25, 1960 (age 65); Hong Kong
- Occupation: Medical simulation expert

Billy Chan (born December 25, 1960) is a medical simulation specialist and educator who serves as an ambassador for the Global Fair Pay Charter. Chan is also the Director of the Centre for Medical Education in Simulation at the Faculty of Medicine of Macau University of Science and Technology.

== Early life and education ==
Billy Chan was born in Hong Kong on December 25, 1960. His father, Michael Chan, was from Macau. Chan completed his education in Hong Kong and later moved to Australia in 1986 to pursue further studies at the University of Western Australia. He was involved in developing medical simulation facilities in cities such as Chongqing, Beijing, and Guangzhou. Chan also received specialized training in disaster management at Massachusetts General Hospital.

Chan previously worked in Perth, Australia at the Clinical Training and Evaluation Centre at the University of Western Australia, home to the first multidisciplinary simulation skills centre in the Southern Hemisphere. He was later recruited to establish the Centre for Medical Education in Simulation at the Faculty of Medicine of Macau University of Science and Technology and played a role in establishing Macau's first medical school in 2019.

== Philanthropic work ==
Chan is the founder and chairman of the Sino-Phil Asia International Peace Awards Foundation, Inc. The foundation has been granted 'Special Consultative Status' as a non-governmental organization (NGO) by ECOSOC the United Nations Economic and Social Council in 2025 during the 15th Plenary Committee meeting. headquartered in Manila. The Foundation's stated mission is "to promote peace through action, enhance the quality of life, and provide an Asian perspective on peace."

He serves as Asia-Pacific Ambassador for the Global Fair Pay Charter, an initiative supported by both the Commonwealth and United Nations. According to Chan, the initiative aims to create opportunities for the Global South by promoting fair pay and improving living conditions.

== Personal life ==
He is the Chairman of the Australian Chamber of Commerce in Macau; and Senior Advisor (Macau) of the Royal Commonwealth Society Hong Kong Branch. He is also an Executive Councillor of the World Association of Chinese Doctors and Co-Founder of the Sino-Luso International Medical Forum, which promotes healthcare education and skill sharing between Macau and Portuguese-speaking countries. He has trained over 10,000 frontline healthcare providers from Macau and China. During the COVID-19 pandemic, Chan participated in efforts to provide personal protective equipment to Lusosphere countries and collaborated with medical professionals in Portugal to fight the pandemic.

== Awards and honours ==
- Knight Grand Cross of the Royal Equestrian and Military Order of Saint Michael of the Wing
- Knight Grand Officer of the Order of Rizal
- Freedom of the City of London
- Knight Grand Cross of the Order of the Eagle of Georgia and the Seamless Tunic of Our Lord Jesus Christ
- Knights Hospitaller The Order of St. John of Jerusalem, Priory of New South Wales, Australia
