= Shuai jiao =

Style of Kung-Fu jacket wrestling

Shuai jiao 摔跤
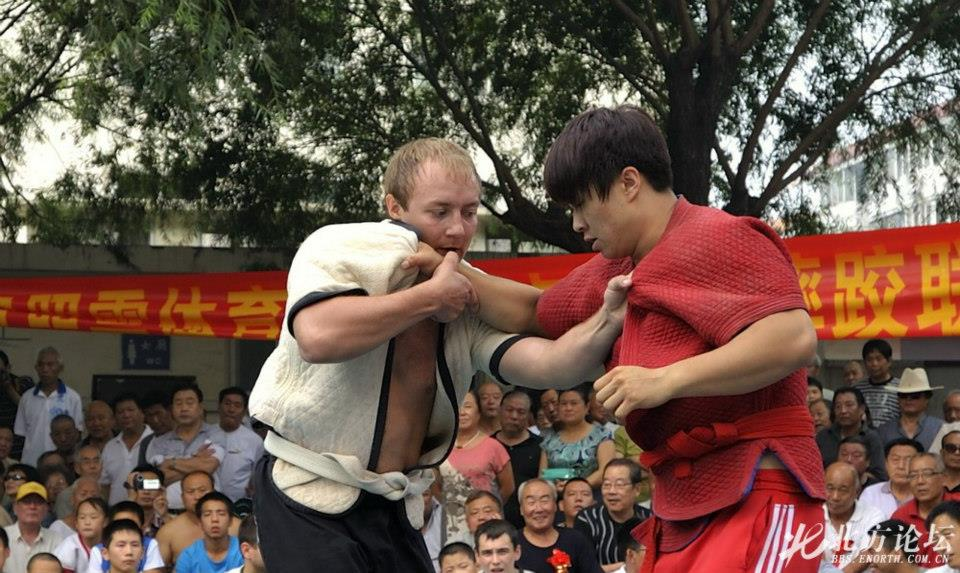
- Two shuai jiao wrestlers testing each other in Tianjin, China.
- Also known as: Kung Fu Wrestling, Chinese Wrestling
- Focus: Jacket wrestling, grappling, joint locks
- Country of origin: Ancient China
- Creator: Unknown (said to have existed for over 6,000 years)
- Olympic sport: No

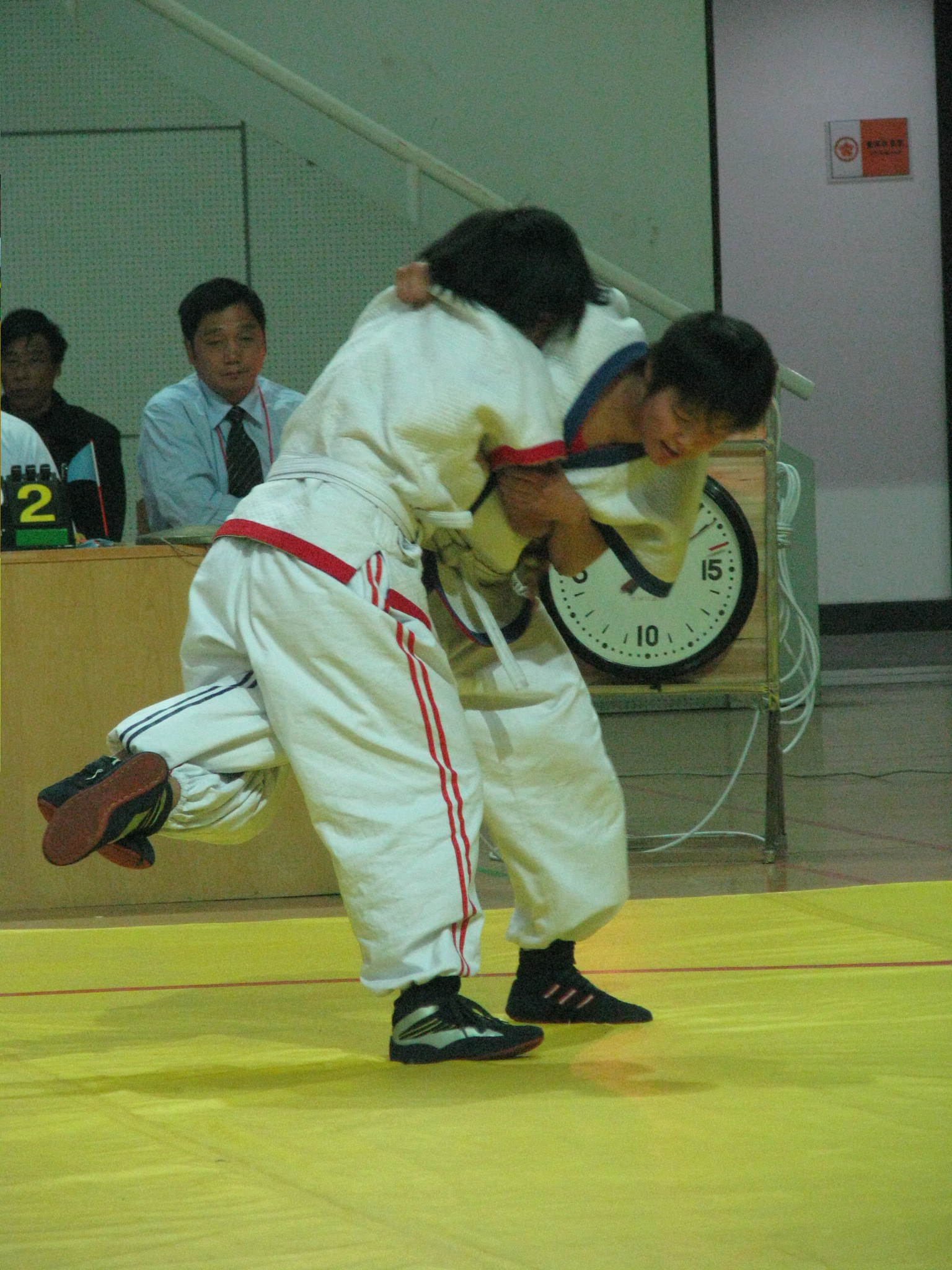
A modern shuai jiao match. One fighter is trying to "sweep" his rival with a leg hook.

Shuai jiao (Chinese: 摔跤 or 摔角; pinyin: Shuāijiāo; Wade–Giles: Shuai Chiao) is the term pertaining to the ancient jacket wrestling wushu style of Beijing, Tianjin and Baoding of Hebei Province in the North China Plain which was codified by Shan Pu Ying (善撲营 The Battalion of Excellency in Catching) of the Nei Wu Fu (内務府, Internal Administration Unit of Imperial Household Department). In modern usage it is also the general Mandarin Chinese term for any form of wrestling, both inside and outside China. As a generic name, it may be used to cover various styles of wrestling practiced in China in the form of a martial arts system or a sport. The art was introduced to Southern China in the Republican era (see Republic of China (1912–1949)) after 1911.

== History ==
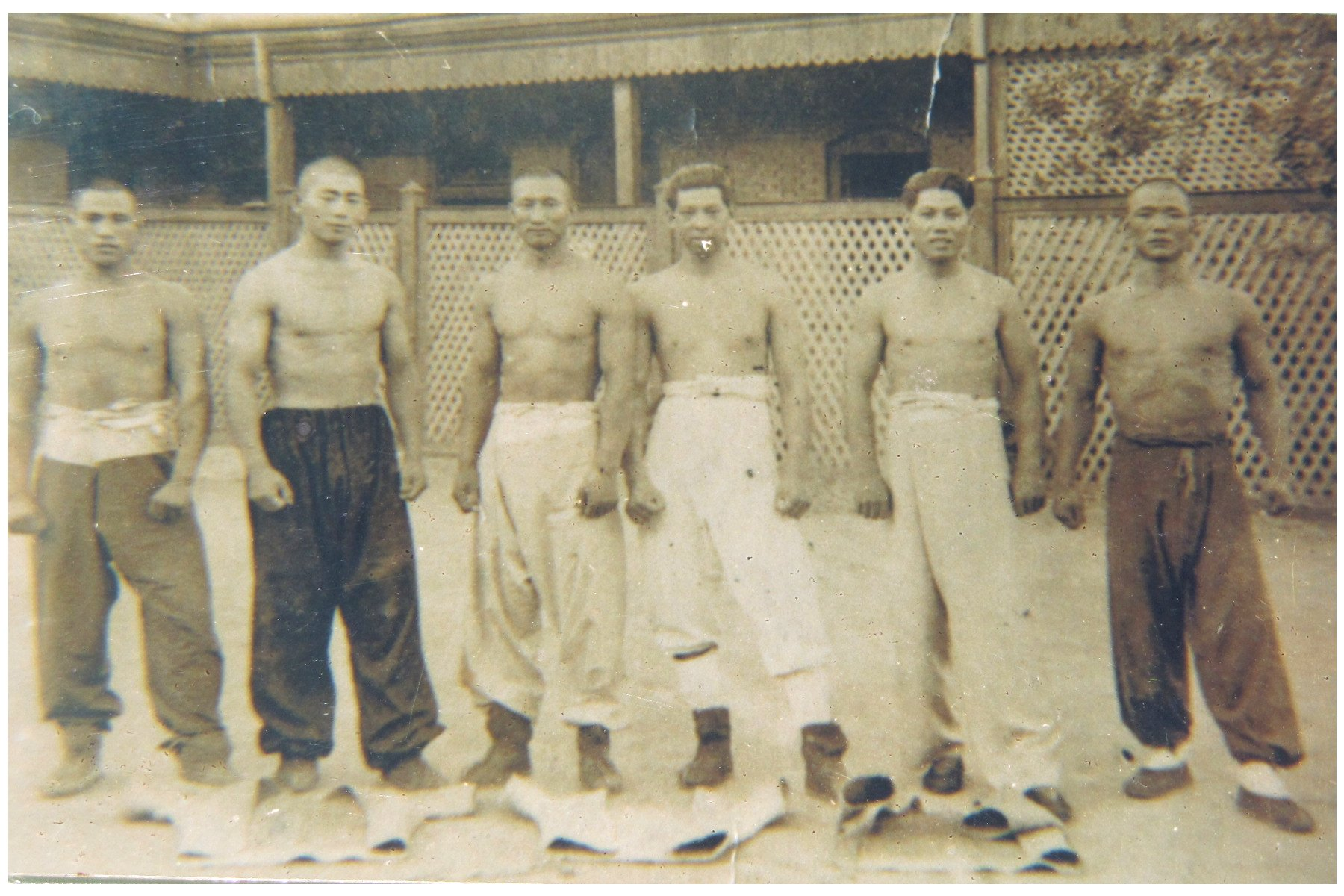
Six shuai jiao masters in Tianjin, 1930.

Over 6,000 years ago, the earliest Chinese term for wrestling, jiaodi (Chinese: 角抵; pinyin: jǐaodǐ; lit. 'horn butting'), refers to an ancient style of military kung fu in which soldiers wore horned headgear with which they attempted to butt, throw and defeat their enemies. Ancient Chinese legends talk about the legendary deity Yellow Emperor who commanded soldiers who used these techniques. In later times, young people would play a similar game, emulating the contests of domestic cattle, without the headgear. Jiaodi has been described as an originating source of wrestling and latter forms of martial arts in China.

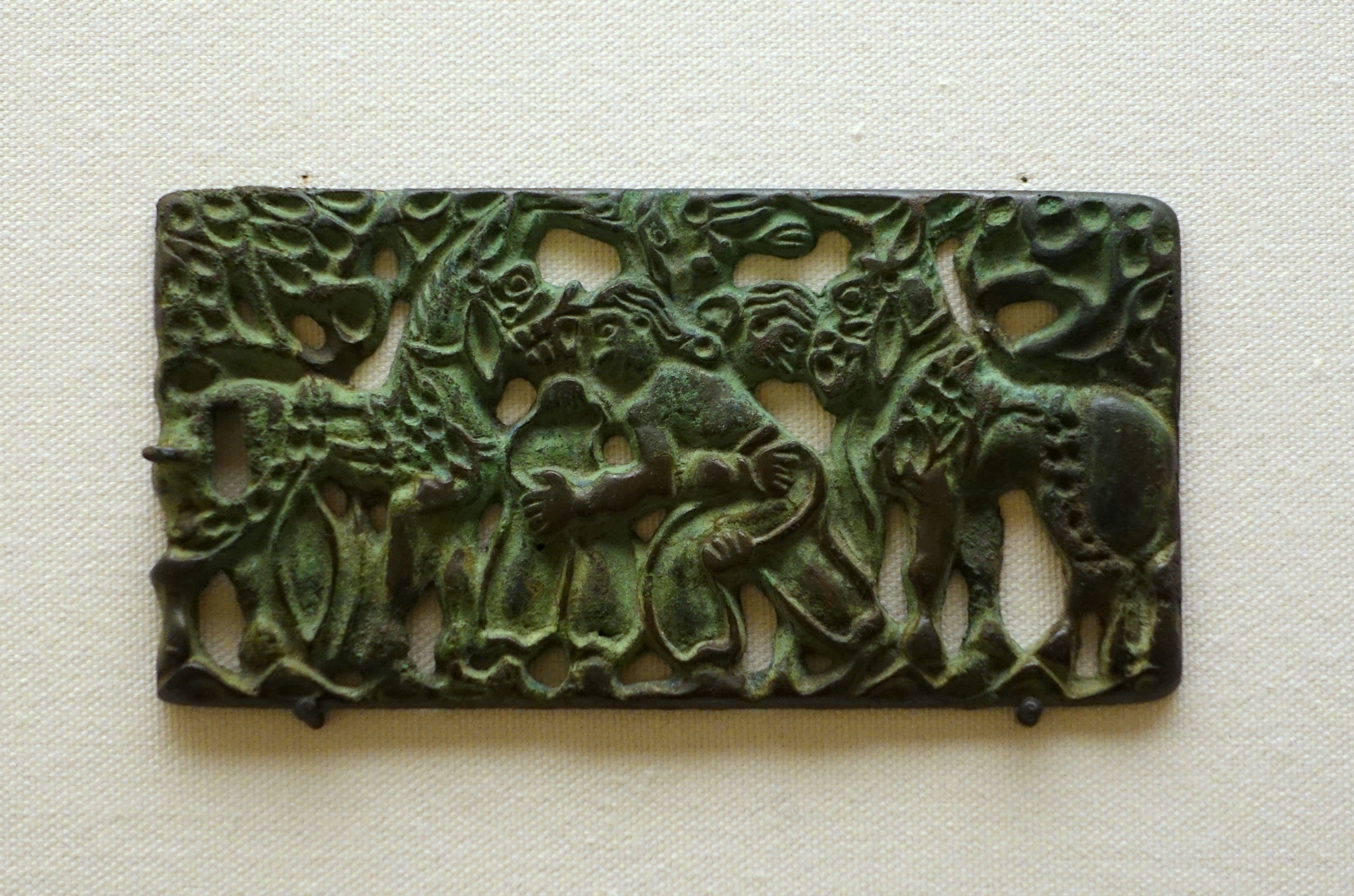
An ancient Ordos culture belt plaque, depicting two dismounted horsemen, engaged in a wrestling match, circa 2nd century BC

Jiao li was first referenced in the Classic of Rites during the Zhou dynasty. Jiao li supplemented throwing techniques with strikes, blocks, joint locks and attacks on pressure points. These exercises were practiced in the winter by soldiers who also practiced archery and studied military strategy.

Jiao li eventually became a public sport held for court amusement as well as for recruiting the best fighters. Competitors wrestled each other on a raised platform called a "lei tai" for the potential reward of being hired as a bodyguard to the emperor or a martial arts instructor for the Imperial Military. Jiao li was taught to soldiers in China over many centuries and its popularity among the military guaranteed its influence on later Chinese martial arts through the end of the Qing dynasty.

== Qing dynasty and Republican Era ==
The Manchu rulers of the Qing dynasty enjoyed wrestling. In the Qing dynasty, wrestling was referred to as liaojiao, guanjiao, buku and jueli/jiaoli. The Kangxi Emperor was reported to have established the Shanpuying (Manchu: buku kifu kvwaran). This was an institution dedicated to training wrestlers. The camp was located in Beijing and counted 300 members, of which 50 were archers, 50 were riders and the remaining 200 were wrestlers. The camp was split into two wings, left and right, based on which way the direction the camps are located from the perspective of the Imperial Palace. Each of the wings was headed by a different wing commander, both of whom answered to the same Zongtong Dachen (總統大臣; "President"). The likely purpose of this split of the camp, Yuhuan writes, was to stimulate rivalry between the two sides so that the wrestlers would always remain competitive. Its members, also called puhu (or buku in Manchu) were expected to perform a variety of duties such as guarding the emperor and wrestling with Central-Asian tribute bearers.

Aside from their normal work, the wrestlers could also earn money by receiving rewards from the emperor by doing extra duties such as performing at banquets and accompanying the emperor on his battue hunts. The Mulan Battue/Mulan Autumn Hunt (Mulan Weilie/Mulan Qiuxian 木蘭圍獵/木蘭秋獮) was a Manchu tradition named after the Manchu word muran for the battue held during the deer mating season. The emperors of the Qing would go to Chengde, beyond the Great Wall, to hold this event. In the event the Inner-Eurasian heritage of the Manchus would be celebrated and Inner-Eurasian subjects of the Manchus, mainly Mongolic, Turkic and Tibetan lords would be invited to join the Great Khan in the festivities. Zhao Yi records that the Mulan hunts were organised so frequently "to subjugate all Mongols, make them harbour fear [our] might and respect [our] virtue, [by] repressing the head and have them submit so that they do not dare to have [ill] intentions."

After the fall of the Qing dynasty, many of the former members of the Shanpuying were forced to make a living teaching wrestling or by busking on the streets. For example, the progenitor of Beijing wrestling was an instructor of the Shanpuying known as Wan Baye (宛八爷), or Wan Yongshun (宛永顺). Wan Yongshun was the founder of the Tianqiao Wrestling School, a prominent wrestling school in Beijing, which gained great popularity in Beijing. This kind of wrestling was unique as it was a blend between the comedic performance art xiangsheng (相声; crosstalk) and wrestling, creating a form of comedic performance wrestling art known as wuxiangsheng (武相声; martial crosstalk).

Wrestling made its way into the Central Guoshu Institute by way of Ma Liang, who wrote the first wrestling manual in China. Shuai jiao was henceforth formalised in 1917 through the manual Zhonghua Xin Wushu (中華新武術; New Chinese Martial Arts) written by Ma Liang, which was disseminated by the educational department of the Republican Government. This formalised style has been taught in schools since 1928.

The term "shuai jiao" was chosen by the Central Guoshu Institute in 1928 when competition rules were standardized . Subsequently, the first Chinese shuai jiao competition was held in 1935. The art continues to be taught in the police and military academies of China.

== Translation ==
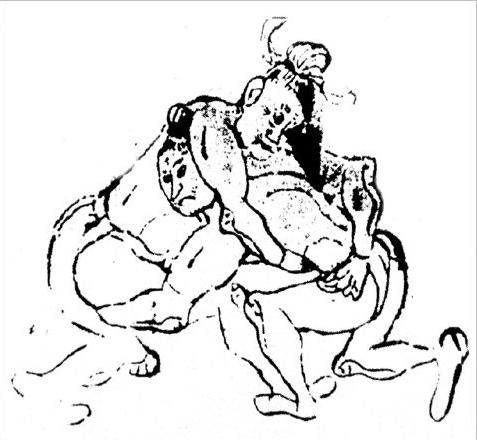
Dunhuang mural, depicting a belt-wrestling match during the Tang dynasty

The word "shuai" (摔), stands for "to throw onto the ground", while "jiao" may be one of two characters: the first and older, 角, stands for "horns" and the second and recent, 跤, stands for "wrestle or trip using the legs". In modern Chinese shuai jiao is always written using the more recent characters 跤, and should be translated as "to trip or throw using the legs". The use of the character 角 is because in the earliest form of shuai jiao, players wore helmet with horns and head-butting was allowed. This form of shuai jiao is called chiyouxi.

== Styles of Chinese wrestling ==
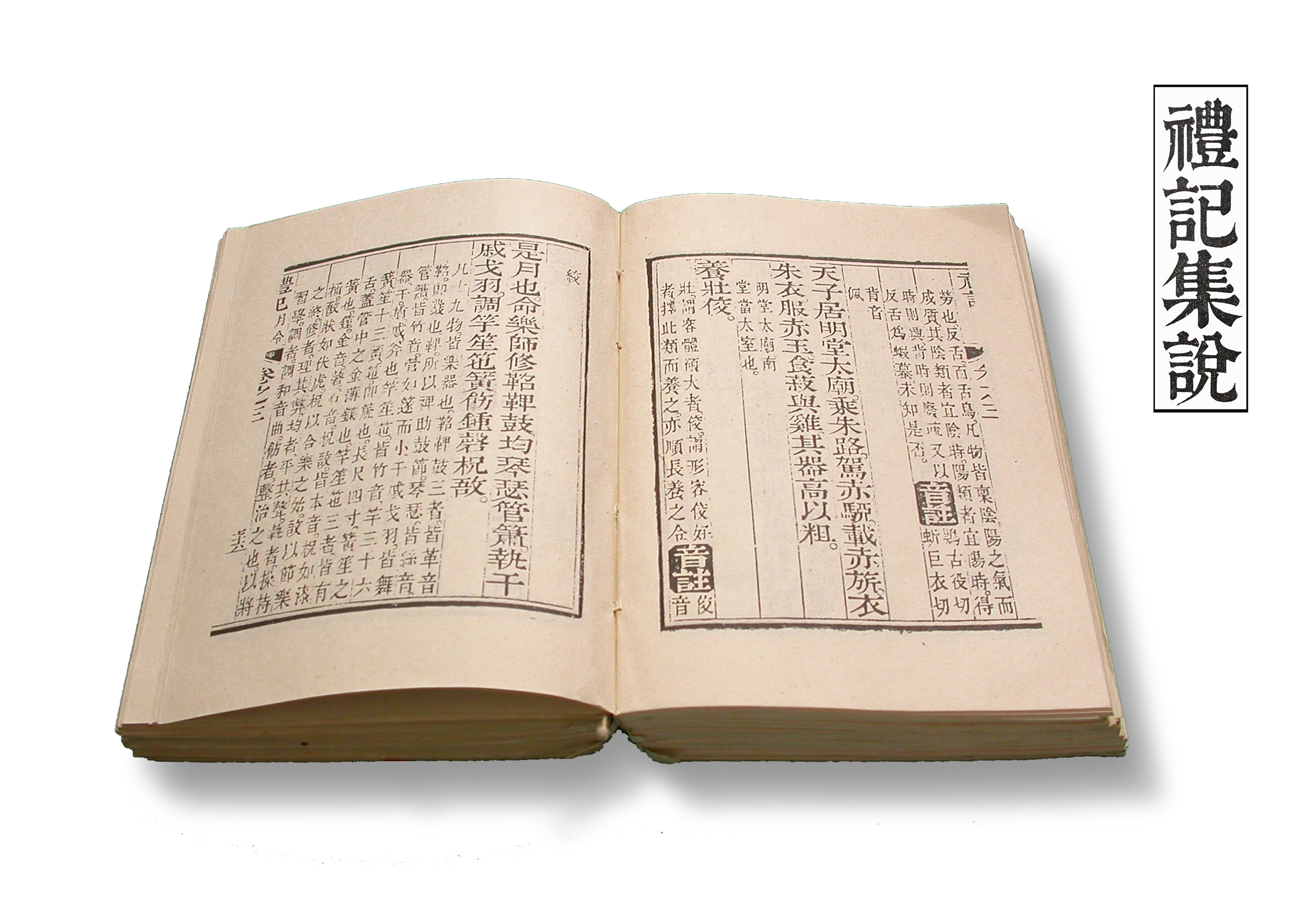
The practice of jiao li in the Zhou dynasty was recorded in the Classic of Rites

Chinese wrestling can be divided into the following styles:

- Zhili– or Hebei–style: This style traces the lineage to the Yellow Emperor who fought two decisive battles against Chiyou and the Yan Emperor in modern-day Zhangjiakou Region in Northern Hebei, to the NW of Beijing. The modern training methods and rules are codified by Shan Pu Ying (善撲营 The Battalion of Excellency in Catching) of the Nei Wu Fu (内務府, Internal Administration Unit of Imperial Household Department). It comprises Beijing, Tianjin and Baoding styles, listed below. Wrestlers wear a jacket called dalian (褡裢).
- Beijing-style: This is in essence the lineage from the Manchu buku style that was practiced by the Imperial Guards Brigade, Shan Pu Ying (善撲营, literally the Expert in Wrestling Unit). The main characteristic is the use of high-level back-carry throws, leg sweeps and pick-up techniques. Arm-locks were also used.
- Tianjin-style: This is the lineage of Ming dynasty wrestling mixed with Manchu buku. The main characteristic is the use of round, circular movements to use the legs to kick and off-balance, and the use of Qin-na (joint locks) as well as using elbows and forearms in blocking and striking.
- Baoding-style: This is the lineage that is called kuaijiao (快跤) or "Fast Wrestling". The main characteristic is the fast application of technique. Another characteristic is the adaptation of Shaolin kung fu from Ping Jingyi (1830-1908), a famous teacher of wrestling who learned Shaolin-style from the Meng family of Nanguan County even though he was a Muslim Hui. In the 21st year of Guangxu's reign, his disciples accidentally killed Guan Luoyin, the Manchu martial arts expert, in a feud between the Manchu and Hui groups.

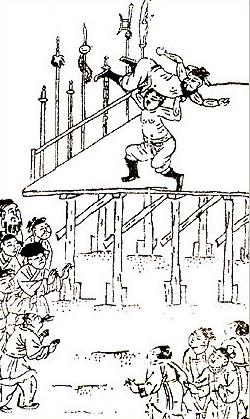
Qin dynasty match, a man has taken control of his rival and is about to throw him off the platform (lei tai).

- Shanxi-style: This is the lineage of traditional Song dynasty wrestling, where Emperor Taizu of Song compiled a wrestling manual of 48 traditional leg catching techniques. Also known as ''Sheep Wrestling'', it is mainly practiced in the counties between the mining city of Datong in northern Shanxi and the provincial capital Taiyuan in central Shanxi. The main characteristic are ankle picks and leg catching techniques to bring the opponent off the ring or platform(lei tai), similar to a concept used in Sumo today, as well as leg-catch takedowns that are seen in Sanda today. Wrestlers wear only knee-length pants, and the pants can be rolled up above the thigh level to create fold-cuffs that can be used for additional grips when grappling.
- Mongolian-style: This style traces its lineage to the wrestling styles of the Donghu Confederation, which included Xianbei, Khitan and Mongol people.

== See also ==
- Chang Dongsheng
- Judo
- Bokh
- Kurash
- Khuresh
- Alysh
- Chin Na
- Wu-style tai chi
- Jujutsu
- Sambo
- Ssireum
- Sumo
- Defendu

== Notes and references ==
General references

- Encyclopedic Dictionary of the Chinese Language, entry 35831.82
- Chinese Fast Wrestling for Fighting, Liang, Shou-Yu and Tai D. Ngo, ISBN 1-886969-49-3
- Journal of Asian Martial Arts Volume 15, No. 1, 2006. Via Media Publishing, Erie Pennsylvania USA. ISSN 1057-8358
- The Method of Chinese Wrestling. Tong Zhongyi, Translated by Tim Cartmell. North Atlantic Books. ISBN 1-55643-609-2
- "Shuai Jiao: An Introduction to the Chinese Throwing Art". Zhang Yun. Journal of Chinese Martial Arts. Volume 15 Number 1 (2006). Pp. 25-61. Via Media Publishing Company. ISSN 1057-8358.
