= Chang Dongsheng =

Chinese martial artist

Chang Dongsheng (Chinese: 常東昇; pinyin: Cháng Dōngshēng; Wade–Giles: Ch'ang Tung-sheng; Xiao'erjing: ﭼْﺎ دْﻮ ﺷْﻊ) (1908–1986) was a Hui martial artist. He was one of the best-known Chinese wrestling (also known as Shuai jiao) practitioners and teachers.

== Biography ==
Born in 1908 in Baoding, Hebei, Chang was remarkably strong among his peers from his early life. Chang's family roasted chickens, and their business provided sufficient income to allow him private lessons with Zhang Fenyen, a local businessman and Shuai Chiao master who practiced baoding shuai jiao under Ping Jingyi. Chang distinguished himself early among Zhang's pupils as a promising martial artist. This led to close personal attention and training in areas normally reserved for more senior students. Zhang taught Chang unorthodox training drills and methods to aid him in developing his shuai jiao skill, including using leg sweeps to drive grasshoppers into the air where the correctly positioned hand could easily catch them.

At 20, after marrying Master Fenyen's second daughter, Chang left Hebei and moved to Nanjing to train at the Guoshu, where many Chinese martial artists trained and shared their knowledge. After five years, Chang competed in 1933 in the 5th National Guoshu Tournament (also called the "All China Full Contact Tournament") and won the heavyweight division against several hundred practitioners, among them the renowned Liu Chiou-Sheng, who went to be his biggest rival. Chang, now nicknamed the "Flying Butterfly," would go on to win numerous challenge matches before entering China's armed forces - traveling across the Kuomintang controlled areas of China to seek out other shuai jiao practitioners in order to test his skills. It is rumored that he may also have first started learning xingyiquan in this period.

In one of his most famous matches, Chang challenged the Mongolian wrestling champion, Hukli, who was supposedly 7 feet tall and weighed near 400 pounds. The contest was judged under wrestling, without strikes or locks. Chang was victorious, throwing down Hukli repeatedly, despite the size difference.

Chang taught at the Central Guoshu Institute and was the youngest faculty member at the time. There, he exchanged knowledge with other martial arts experts. He created his own variation of tai chi and xingyiquan, Chang-style tai chi, based on Yang-style tai chi, xingyiquan and his shuai jiao knowledge. Chang traveled across all China and studied under around 70 masters, always introducing himself as a simple student in order to learn everything possible.

Throughout the Second Sino-Japanese War and World War II, Chang instructed large numbers of Chinese Nationalist troops in Shuai Chiao, including the elite Red Wall paratroopers, while continuing to overcome numerous challenges. When not otherwise occupied, Chang visited several POW camps to test his Shuai Chiao against captured Japanese practitioners of judo, jujutsu and karate. It was specially important his performance in the Guangxi prison, where he defeated judo practitioners Haido Takayama, Takuma Hisa and Masao Hichi. Chang represented the Army in 1948 when he was victorious in a nationwide competition for shuai jiao, Chin Na, grappling and throwing all together.

When Kuomintang troops under Chiang Kai-shek were driven from mainland China to Taiwan after the civil war, Chang left for Taiwan. On the establishment of the National Police University, in Taipei in the Republic of China, Chang was given a position of Senior Instructor in unarmed training by Presidential edict. He taught there for over 30 years.

There are several famous anecdotes about Chang's short temper. In one occasion, a man came to the Taipei National Police University and asked to train with him; instead of answering, Chang attacked the visitor and threw him down, forcing him to confess that he had actually come to challenge him after the training, something Chang had already figured out. Similarly, Robert W. Smith travelled to Taiwan to interview Chang and train with him. However, when Smith asked Chang to demonstrate his skills, Chang kicked him in the groin.

Remaining undefeated in martial arts his whole life, Chang died in 1986 of aggressive esophageal cancer.

== Personal life ==
Chang was a devout and practicing Muslim.
