= A6004 road (Great Britain) =

Road in Loughborough, England

A6004
- Loughborough Ring Road
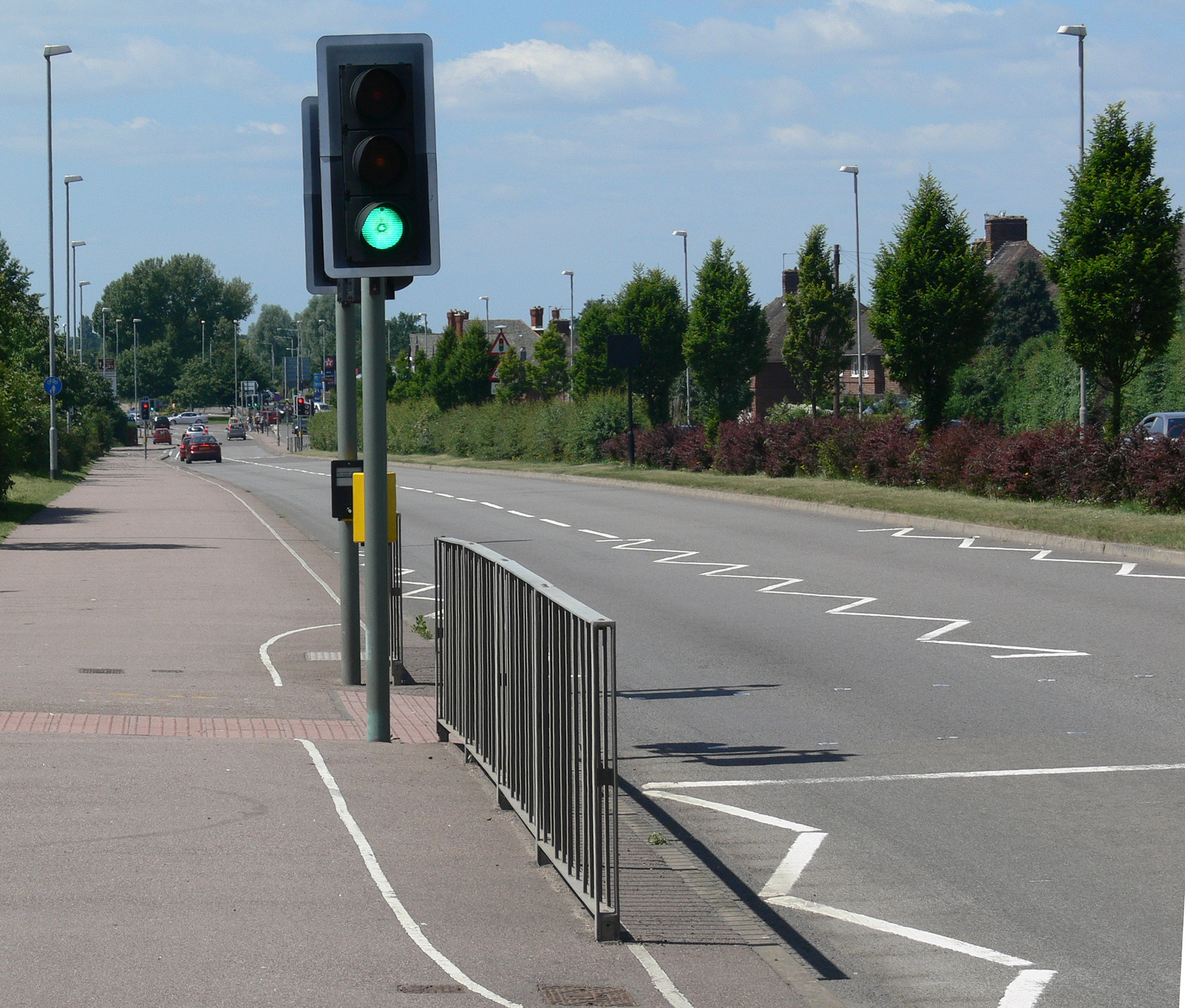
- A6004 in Shelthorpe

Route information
- Length: 4.4 mi (7.1 km)

Major junctions
- Orbital around Loughborough, Leicestershire
- From: A6, near Quorn
- A6 A512; A6; A60
- To: A60 Nottingham Road, near to Loughborough railway station

Location
- Country: United Kingdom
- Constituent country: England

Road network
- Roads in the United Kingdom; Motorways; A and B road zones
← A6003	→ A6005

The A6004 is a main road in the market town of Loughborough, in the Charnwood borough of Leicestershire, England. It acts as the town's ring road, and runs between the A6, near the village of Quorn, to the A60 Nottingham Road, near Loughborough railway station.

== Route ==
The A6004 starts at One Ash Roundabout, just south of Loughborough, where it intersects with the A6 and Loughborough Road. It then heads northwest, via Terry Yardley Way. It passes through Woodthorpe Roundabout, where it intersects with Main Street (which leads into the hamlet of Woodthorpe), Allendale Road, and Carnation Road (both of which lead into recently completed housing estates). A new Aldi supermarket and restaurants were built off Allendale Road.

From there it runs via Ling Road in Shelthorpe, formerly a residential road. When Ling Road was upgraded in 2004, it became a dual carriageway road; some of the junctions on the upgraded road were poorly designed. For instance, vehicles can only turn right out of Woodthorpe Road, and Kinchbus's service 11 has to turn left onto Ling Road and make a U-turn around at Park Road Roundabout to get from Beaumont Road and Woodthorpe Road. At Park Road Roundabout, the road changes name to Epinal Way. Park Road roundabout is where Shelthorpe's main group of shops are, including a McDonald's, a OneStop convenience store, and a Tesco hypermarket. Between Park Road and Beacon Road roundabouts Epinal Way runs alongside Lansdowne Drive.

After Beacon Road, it next runs alongside allotments to Forest Road. The next section of Epinal Way mainly runs in between the University and Loughborough College. The next major intersection is where it crosses Ashby Road (A512) at a roundabout. The section of Epinal Way between here and Garendon Road was formerly part of the old road between Ashby Road and Thorpe Acre, and was one of the first parts of the road to be built. Afterwards it runs between the fire station and Loughborough Hospital. At the next roundabout (Alan Moss Road) it takes a right turn into Alan Moss Road. This road has four residential roads connecting onto it on the north side.

It crosses the A6 at a crossroads. At this junction there have been several accidents involving articulated trucks turning left from Derby Road southbound to Belton Road. Also, in spring 2018, the layout of the junction has been altered, so that vehicles from Derby Road southbound cannot turn right into Alan Moss Road. From there the road changes name again, to Belton Road. The road passes through an industrial estate, which includes (on the south side) the Loughborough Motor Park, home to all of Loughborough's new car dealerships, and a few supermarkets and hardware stores. The road then briefly runs alongside the Grand Union Canal, through the site of an old factory which was demolished and redeveloped for housing, and then joins the original section of Belton Road until it reaches Meadow Lane crossroads. From there it turns left onto Meadow Lane, then at another crossroads turns right onto Station Boulevard, a new road built alongside the Midland Mainline, and ends at Loughborough Midland Station, at its junction with Nottingham Road (A60).

== History ==
The original route of the A6004 followed the route of what was later the B589, beginning at the A6 Derby Road, before running north-east up Bridge Street, Toothill Road and Clarence Street before ending at the A60 Nottingham Road.

Plans to build a bypass running past the west of Loughborough were being proposed as early as 1925, and land was set aside along the route of the proposed road. However, construction did not begin until the 1970s, and by this time, the town had grown significantly beyond the land reserved for the bypass. The road was built in sections, with the final section, which included a new bridge over the Great Central Railway, being completed in 2006. Because the road was built in sections over a period of over thirty years, the route of the A6004 has been subject to various route changes at different phases of construction.

Also, before Station Boulevard was built, the A6004 went straight at the Meadow Lane crossroads and through Ratcliffe Road. Ratcliffe Road was closed off at the Nottingham Road end when Station Boulevard was built; the area near Loughborough railway station was being regenerated.
