= A60 road =

Road in England

A60

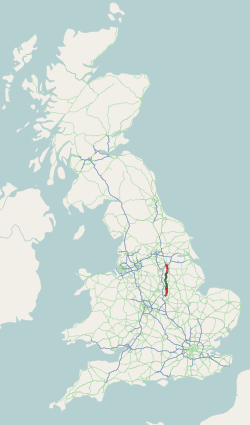

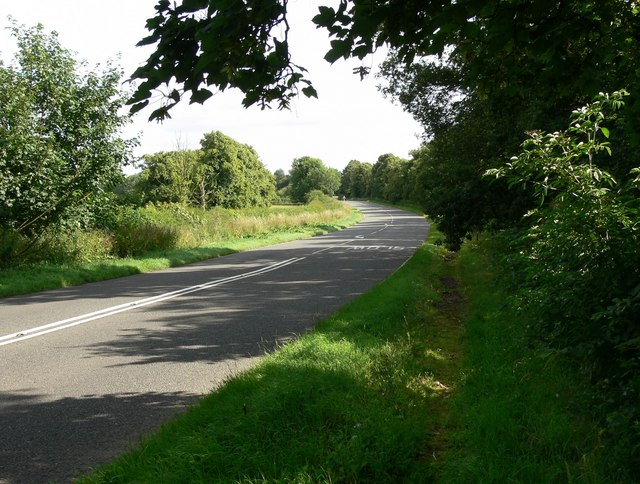
- The A60 near Rempstone

Route information
- Length: 59.0 mi (95.0 km)

Major junctions
- South end: A6 in Loughborough; 52.7680°N 1.2008°W
- A52 near Ruddington; A57 in Worksop
- North end: A630 in Doncaster; 53.5078°N 1.1487°W

Location
- Country: United Kingdom
- Counties: Nottinghamshire; South Yorkshire
- Primary destinations: Nottingham; Mansfield; Worksop

Road network
- Roads in the United Kingdom; Motorways; A and B road zones
← A59	→ A61

The A60 is a road linking Loughborough in Leicestershire, England, with Doncaster in South Yorkshire, via Nottingham.

== Route ==
It takes the following route:

- Loughborough
  - Cotes
  - Hoton
  - Rempstone
  - Costock
  - Bunny
  - Bradmore
  - Ruddington
- West Bridgford
- Nottingham
  - Sherwood
  - Arnold
  - Ravenshead
- Mansfield
- Market Warsop
- Worksop
  - Carlton in Lindrick
- Tickhill
- Wadworth
- Doncaster

== Junction list ==
County	Location	mi	km	Destinations	Notes
Leicestershire	Loughborough	0.0	0.0	A6 (Leicester Road) to M1 – Town centre, Derby	Southern terminus
Leicestershire	Loughborough	0.8	1.3	A6004 west (Station Boulevard) to M1 / A6 – Nottingham, Melton Mowbray, Derby	Nottingham and Melton Mowbray signed northbound only, To M1, A6 and Derby southbound only; eastern terminus of A6004
Leicestershire	Rempstone	4.6	7.4	A6006 (Ashby Road / Main Street) to A6 – Zouch, Melton Mowbray, Wymeswold, Ashby-de-la-Zouch, Hathern, Loughborough	To A6, Zouch and Loughborough signed northbound only, Ashby-de-la-Zouch and Hathern signed southbound only
Nottinghamshire	Ruddington– West Bridgford boundary	11.5	18.5	A52 (Clifton Boulevard) to M1 / A46 / A453 / A606 – Nottingham, Derby, Grantham, Melton, Newark, Leicester, Birmingham, Wilford, Clifton, Beeston, Tollerton, Plumtree	Nottingham, Wilford, Clifton, Beeston, Tollerton and Plumtree signed northbound only, To A46, A453, Newark, Leicester and Birmingham signed southbound only
Nottinghamshire	West Bridgford	13.5	21.7	A606 east (Melton Road) to A46 – Melton, Leicester	No access from A60 north to A606; western terminus of A606
Nottinghamshire	West Bridgford	13.9	22.4	Radcliffe Road(A6520) to A46 / A52 / A612 – Nottingham, Grantham, Southwell, Newark, West Bridgford	Nottingham signed northbound only, To A46 and Newark signed southbound only
Nottinghamshire	Nottingham	14.1– 14.4	22.7– 23.2	County Road (A6011 east) to A612 / A52 – Southwell, Grantham	Western terminus of A6011
Nottinghamshire	Nottingham	14.6	23.5	Queen's Road (A6008) to M1 / A453 – City centre (W)	To A453 and City centre signed northbound only; southern terminus of A6008 concurrency
Nottinghamshire	Nottingham	15.1	24.3	Southwell Road (A612 northeast) – Sneinton, Carlton	Information signed southbound only; southwestern terminus of A612
Nottinghamshire	Nottingham	15.3	24.6	Upper Parliament Street (A6008 – Hockley	Information signed northbound only; northern terminus of A6008 concurrency
Nottinghamshire	Nottingham	16.3	26.2	Gregory Boulevard (A6130 south) / M1 / B682 – Bulwell	Information signed northbound only; northern terminus of A6130
Nottinghamshire	Nottingham	16.5	26.6	A611 north (Hucknall Road) / Magdala Road – Hucknall	No access from A60 south to A611, from A611 to A60 north, or from A60 north to Magdala; southern terminus of A611
Nottinghamshire	Nottingham– Woodthorpe boundary	18.1	29.1	A6514 south (Ring Road / Valley Road) to M1 / A52	Northern terminus of A6514
Nottinghamshire	Nottingham– Woodthorpe boundary	18.2	29.3	Arno Vale Road (A6211 east)	Western terminus of A6211
Nottinghamshire	Redhill	20.3	32.7	A614 north (Ollerton Road) to A1 – Doncaster	Southern terminus of A614
Nottinghamshire	Mansfield	27.6	44.4	A617 to M1 north / A38 – Chesterfield, Derby, Newark, Sutton-in-Ashfield, Rainworth, Forest Town	
Nottinghamshire	Mansfield	27.9	44.9	A611 south (Derby Road) to M1 south / B6020 – Hucknall, Sutton-in-Ashfield	Northern terminus of A611
Nottinghamshire	Mansfield	29.2	47.0	A6009 (Portland Street) to M1 / A38 / A6191 / A617 – Derby, Chesterfield, Pleasley, Sutton-in-Ashfield	To A6191, A617, Chesterfield, and Pleasley signed northbound only, Sutton southbound only; southern terminus of A6009 concurrency
Nottinghamshire	Mansfield	29.7	47.8	A6191 southeast (Ratcliffe Gate) to A617 – Newark, Rainworth	Southern terminus of A6191 concurrency
Nottinghamshire	Mansfield	30.0	48.3	A6009 northwest / A6191 north (Chesterfield Road South) to M1 / A6191 / A617 – Chesterfield, Pleasley	A6009, A6191 and Pleasley signed southbound only; northern terminus of A6009 / A6191 concurrency
Nottinghamshire	Mansfield Woodhouse	30.8	49.6	Old Mill Lane (A6117 south) / Butt Lane to A6075 – Sutton-in-Ashfield, Forest Town, Clipstone	Northern terminus of A6117
Nottinghamshire	Mansfield Woodhouse	31.4	50.5	A6075 west (Warsop Road) to M1 / A617 – Chesterfield, Sutton-in-Ashfield	A6075 signed northbound only, To M1 and Sutton southbound only; southern terminus of A6075 concurrency
Nottinghamshire	Mansfield Woodhouse	31.6	50.9	A6075 east (Peafield Lane) – Edwinstowe, Ollerton	Northern terminus of A6075 concurrency
Nottinghamshire	Cuckney	36.5	58.7	A616 (Creswell Road) / A632 west (Langwith Road) to A6135 – Newark, Ollerton, Chesterfield, Langwith, Bolsover, Shirebrook, Creswell, Clowne, Sheffield	To A6135, Creswell and Clowne signed northbound only, Edwinstowe signed southbound only; eastern terminus of A632
Nottinghamshire	Worksop	41.5	66.8	A619 west to M1 – Chesterfield	Eastern terminus of A619
Nottinghamshire	Worksop	42.5	68.4	A57 east / Newcastle Avenue (B6024) to A1 / A614 / A620 / B6040 – Town centre, Lincoln, Newark, Nottingham, Retford, Ollerton, Elkesley	To A620, Retford and Elkesley signed southbound only; southern terminus of A57 concurrency
Nottinghamshire	Rhodesia	43.1	69.4	A57 west to M1 – The North, Sheffield, Rotherham, Gateford, Shireoaks, South Anston	Gateford signed northbound, S Anston southbound only; northern terminus of A57 concurrency
Nottinghamshire	Oldcotes	49.9	80.3	A634 (Maltby Road / Blyth Road) – Rotherham, Blyth	
South Yorkshire	Tickhill	52.6	84.7	A631 west (Rotherham Road) to M18 / M1 – Rotherham, Sheffield	Southern terminus of A631 concurrency
South Yorkshire	Tickhill	53.1	85.5	A631 east (Sunderland Street) – Bawtry	Northern terminus of A631 concurrency
South Yorkshire	Doncaster	59.0	95.0	A630 (High Road / Balby Road) to A1(M) – Rotherham, Sheffield, Doncaster	Northern terminus
1.000 mi = 1.609 km; 1.000 km = 0.621 mi: Concurrency terminus; Incomplete access
