= A512 road =

Road in England

A512

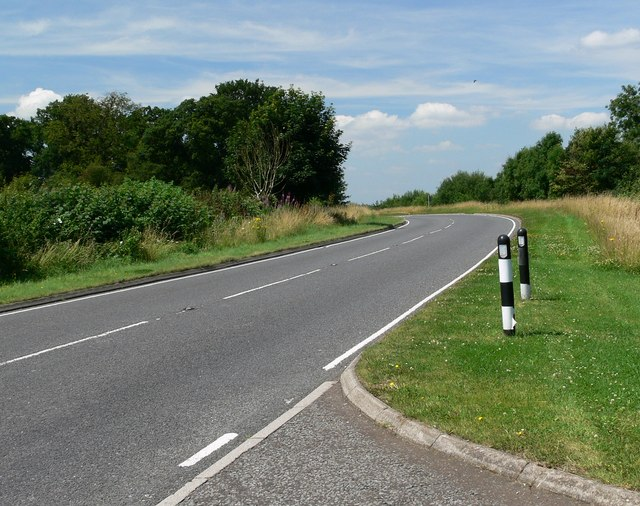

Route information
- Length: 19 mi (31 km)

Major junctions
- East end: Loughborough
- A6004 M1 Junction 23 A511; A42 Junction 13
- West end: A42 Junction 13

Location
- Country: United Kingdom
- Constituent country: England
- Primary destinations: Loughborough; Loughborough University; Shepshed; Ashby-de-la-Zouch

Road network
- Roads in the United Kingdom; Motorways; A and B road zones
← A511	→ A513

The A512 is an A road entirely in Leicestershire, UK. It links the primary destination of Loughborough with the M1, A42 road, and the town of Ashby de la Zouch.

The road begins just outside Loughborough Town Centre, near to The Rushes (52.7724°N 1.2078°W). It heads out of town, crossing the A6004 Epinal Way and passing Loughborough University. On leaving the town, there is a short dual carriageway section, leading to the junction with Snells Nook Lane to Nanpantan and Woodhouse.

After this junction, the road returned to single carriageway for about 1 mile (1.6 km), to Junction 23 of the M1, but was upgraded to dual carriageway with a new roundabout, in preparation for the Garendon Park housing development, with the works finishing in June 2021.

At this junction, much of the traffic from Loughborough turns off, and it is a much quieter A512 that enters Shepshed. After Shepshed, the road passes through Northern Charnwood Forest, near the villages of Peggs Green, Thringstone, Griffydam, Belton and Osgathorpe. Shortly before Ashby it passes Coleorton Hall on the right – a house which has played host to Scott, Wordsworth, Coleridge and others – now converted to apartments.

The road ends at the junction with the A42 and A511 (formerly the A50), on the edge of Ashby (52.7491°N 1.4456°W).

The A512 is 11 miles (18 km) long, with the M1 junction 8 miles (13 km) from the southern end.
