= Thorpe Acre =

Coordinates: 52°46′45″N 01°14′15″W

- Suburb
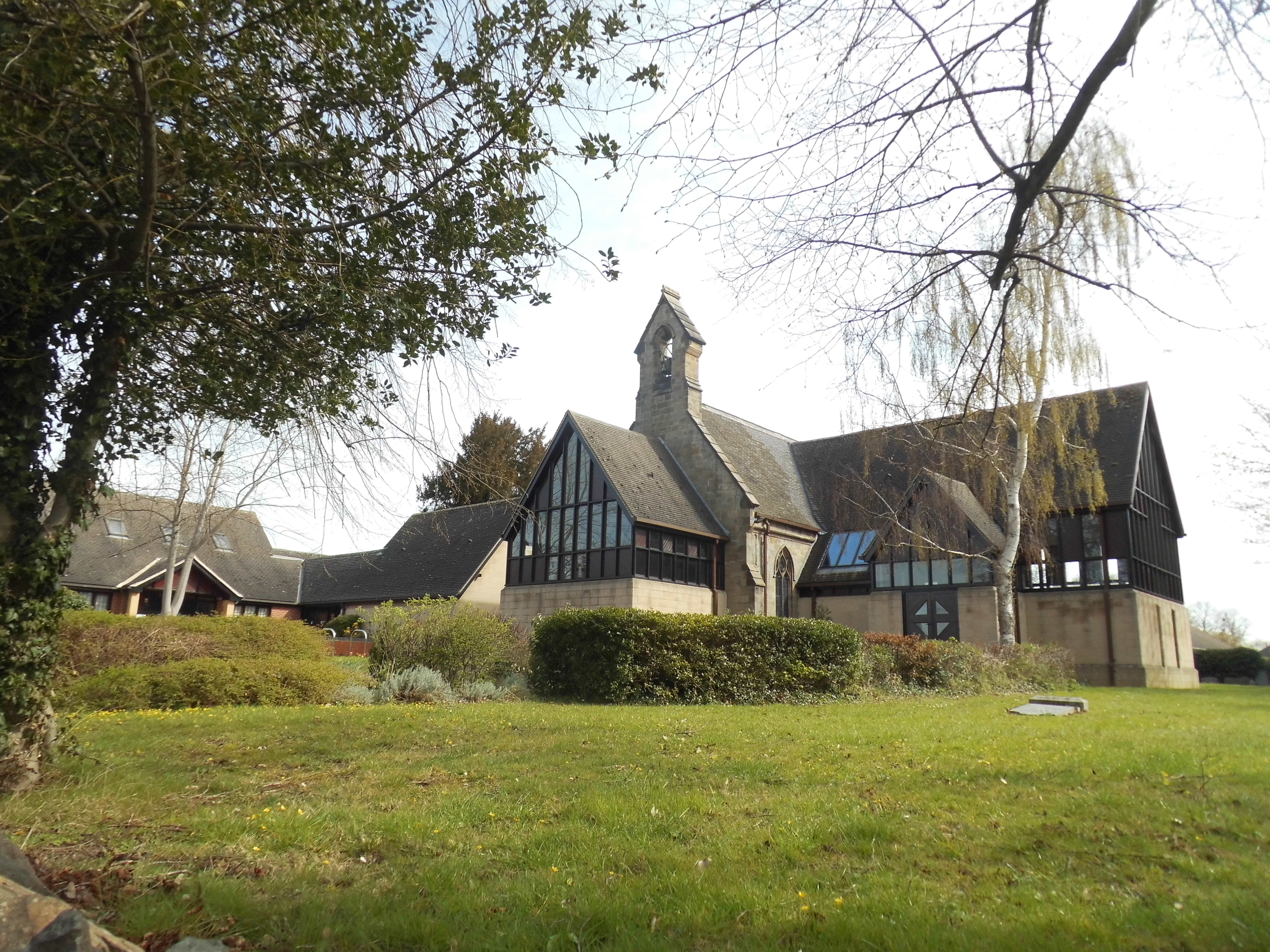
- All Saints Church Thorpe Acre with Dishley
- Region: East Midlands
- Country: England
- Sovereign state: United Kingdom

Thorpe Acre is a suburb of Loughborough, Leicestershire.

== History ==
Until the mid-twentieth century, it was a hamlet of about twenty houses or cottages, several of which survive. There is also a nineteenth-century church with contemporary extensions, All Saints Church Thorpe Acre with Dishley (not to be confused with All Saints Church in Loughborough town centre), as well as an old hostelry, The Plough Inn. The population is included in the Loughborough-Garendon and Loughborough Ashby Wards of Charnwood Borough Council.

Following the Second World War, Loughborough needed more housing and part of Thorpe Acre was developed, largely for employees of Brush Engineering Works, during the 1950s. A new shopping area with a selection of local shops, now known colloquially as The Ville, was built. It was at this time that the village green was created; the area where the green is was formerly built-up.

In the 1960s and early 1970s, Thorpe Acre was chosen for a large new housing estate; these developments have completely subsumed the old village. Two of Loughborough's secondary schools, Charnwood College and De Lisle College are located on the edge of the estate, as well as Maplewell Hall and Ashmount special schools.

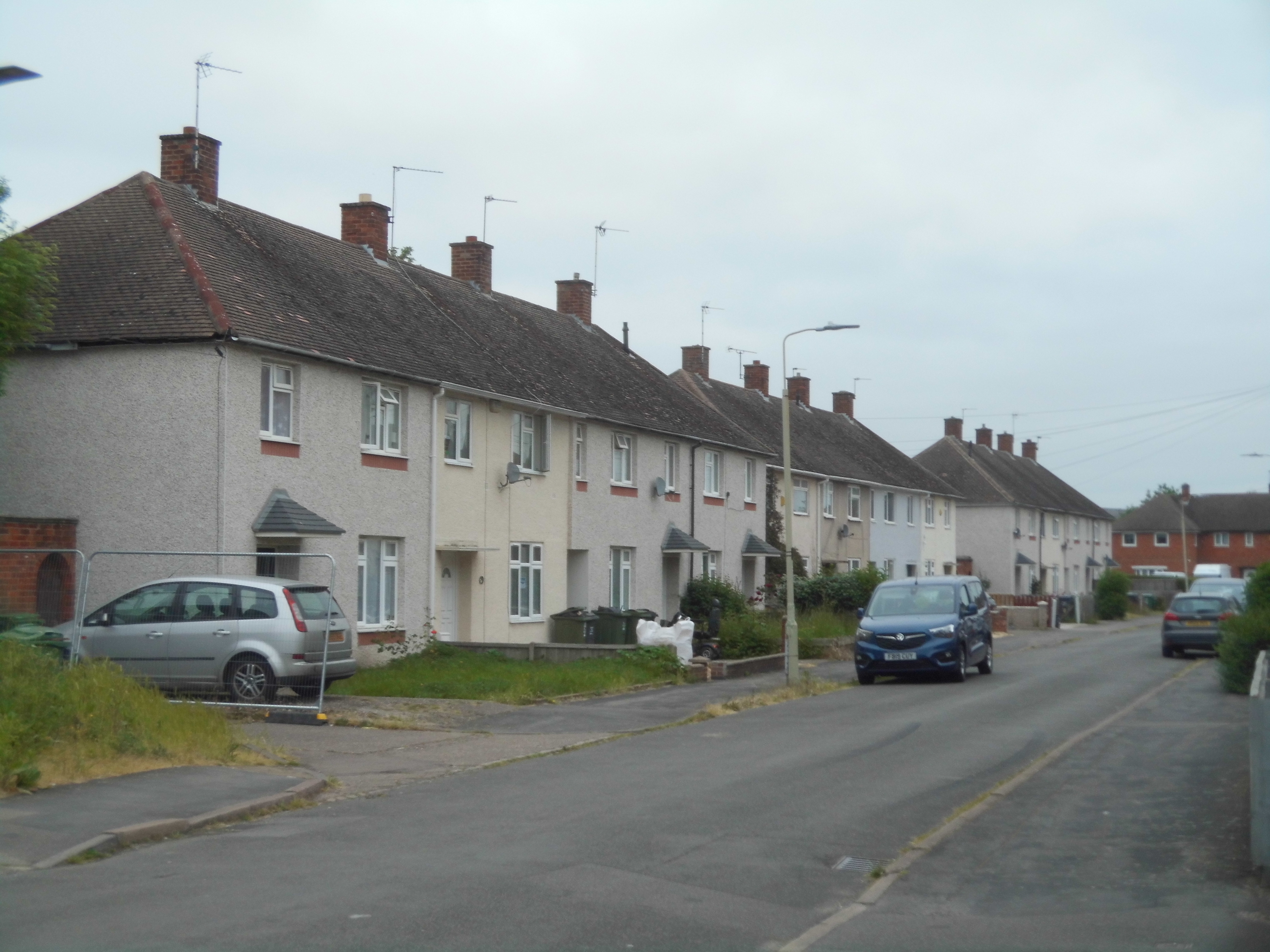
1950s-built Wimpey no-fines houses, Browning Road, Knightthorpe Estate, Thorpe Acre, Loughborough, UK

In recent years, the council estates have suffered from crime problems and antisocial behaviour not unlike such problems experienced on many council estates up and down the United Kingdom.

The area lies on the boundary of Garendon Park, one of the great Leicestershire deer parks of the eighteenth century.

All Saints Church, Thorpe Acre with Dishley, was built in 1845 and extended in 1985.www.astad.org. The Dishley Church is now a ruin on the Derby Road, Loughborough. Robert Bakewell (1726–1795), the agriculturalist, is buried there.

Thorpe Acre has a men's football team, established in 2017, which plays in the North Leicestershire Football League and is managed by Declan Bestwick.
