= All Saints Church, Loughborough =

Church in Leicestershire, England

Coordinates: 52°46′27.66″N 1°12′13.60″W

All Saints with Holy Trinity, Loughborough
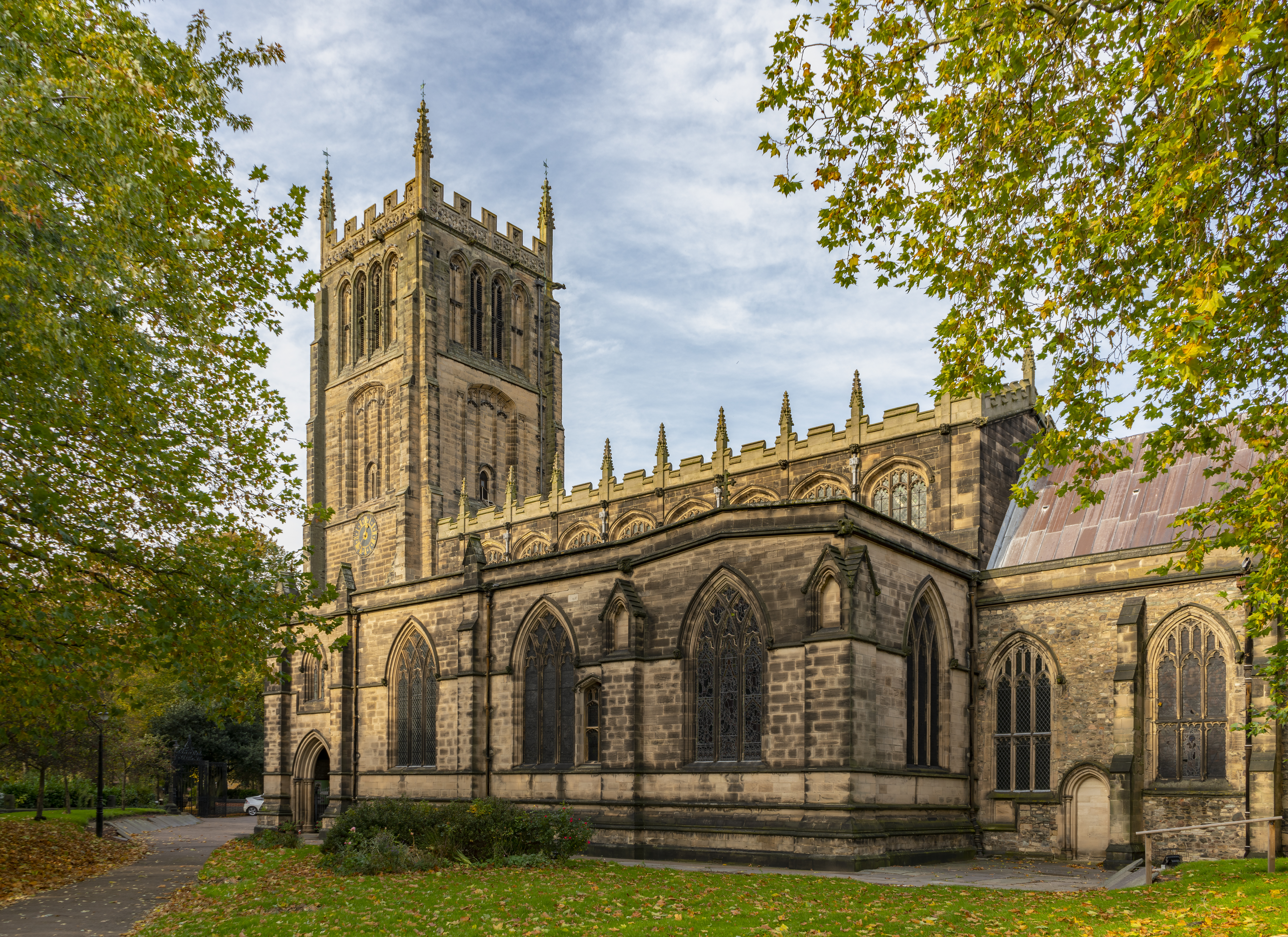
- All Saints with Holy Trinity, Loughborough
- All Saints with Holy Trinity, Loughborough
- Denomination: Church of England
- Churchmanship: Broad Church
- Website: www.allsaintsloughborough.org.uk

History
- Dedication: All Saints

Administration
- Province: Canterbury
- Diocese: Leicester
- Parish: Loughborough

Clergy
- Rector: Emily Sharman

All Saints Church, officially All Saints with Holy Trinity is the Church of England parish church of the town of Loughborough, Leicestershire within the Diocese of Leicester.

== History ==
The church dates from the 14th century; the tower from the 15th century. It is located on a slight rise within the old town and is probably the site of a pre-Christian place of worship. All Saints is one of the largest parish churches in England, which is an indication of the importance of Loughborough in the mediaeval wool trade. Loughborough Grammar School was likely founded by a priest at the church c. 1496, paid for in the will of local wool merchant Thomas Burton, and the school was housed within the church grounds until it moved away to its purpose-built campus in 1850. The hymn composer G. W. Briggs (himself an Old Loughburian) was rector of All Saints from 1918 to 1934.

Next door is the Old Rectory, originally a mediaeval manor house, the earliest record of which is 1228. It was mostly demolished before it was recognised that large parts of the mediaeval house remained. It now contains a museum which is open on summer Saturdays.

The postcode for the church is LE11 1UX, and its official address is on Rectory Road. However, the main entrance leads onto Steeple Row and Church Gate, the latter a mediaeval street that connects the old town and the church to the modern town centre (Market Place), though now devoid of mediaeval buildings is of mediaeval width and now partially pedestrianised.

In December 2022, the church garnered controversy after they used a revised set of lyrics to the hymn God Rest Ye Merry Gentlemen with references to “queer and questioning” individuals and “women, who by men have been erased.”

=== List of rectors ===
- Richard de Dalham, Dean of Lichfield 1193 – 1214
- Robert de Verdon 1215 – 1227
- Thomas de Turville 1227 – 1244
- Thomas de Torp 1244 – 1280 x 1286
- ? 1280 x 1286 – 1315
- Thomas de Stanton 1315 – 1321
- John de Denton 1321 – 1325
- John Whitstone 1325 – 1348
- John Leeke 1349 – 1353
- Robert de Hull de Segrave 1353 – 1358
- John Leeke 1358 – 1369 (again)
- Richard Bokelly 1369 – 1375
- John de Campeden 1375 – 1381
- Thomas Wroxton 1381 – 1408
- John Southam 1408 – 1416
- Thomas Henkeston 1416 – 1419
- Robert Fry 1419 – 1435
- Thomas Loughborough 1435 – 1450
- John Auncell 1450 – 1452
- John Trypp 1452 – 1454
- Henry Greene 1454 – 1473
- John Fisher 1473 – 1494
- Simon Tavenour 1494 – 1500
- Richard Lavender 1500 – 1508
- Robert Blackwall 1508 – 1509
- Geoffrey Wren 1509 – 1527
- Robert Fabyan alias Clerke 1527 – 1533
- Thomas Adeson 1533 – 1540
- Peter Ashton 1540 – 1548
- John Willock 1548 – 1554 (ejected)
- Arthur Lowe 1554 – 1559 (ejected)
- John Willock 1559 – 1585 (restored)
- John Browne, sr 1586 – 1616
- John Browne, jr 1616 – 1643
- Nicholas Hall 1643 – 1647 (ejected)
- Oliver Bromskill 1647 – 1662 (ejected) Bromskill was appointed by the Leicestershire Parliamentary committee during the imposition of a Presbyterian polity and removed during the Great Ejection.
- Nicholas Hall 1662 – 1669 (restored)
- George Bright 1669 – 1696
- John Alleyne 1696 – 1739
- Thomas Alleyne 1739 – 1761
- James Bickham 1761 – 1785
- Samuel Blackall 1786 – 1792
- Francis Wilcox 1792 – 1798
- Richard Hardy 1798 – 1826
- William Holme 1826 – 1848
- Henry Fearon 1848 – 1885 (also Archdeacon of Leicester 1863 – 1885)
- Thomas Pitts 1885 – 1917
- George Wallace Briggs 1918 – 1934
- William John Lyon 1934 – 1958
- Ronald Albert Jones 1959 – 1976
- Leonard George Edward Hancock 1976 – 1993
- Stephen Arthur Cherry 1994 – 2006 (now Dean of Kings College Cambridge)
- Rachel Anne Ross 2008 – 2014
- Wendy Dalrymple 2015 – 2023
- Emily Sharman 2025 – present

== Organisation ==
All Saints is the official seat of the Archdeacon of Loughborough, previously The Venerable Paul Hackwood, who nevertheless normally resides at St Peter's, Glenfield in Leicester. The Archdeacon oversees the 6 deaneries in Western Leicestershire which are named after ancient hundreds; Akeley East (Loughborough), Akeley South (Coalville), Akeley West (Ashby-de-la-Zouch), Guthlaxton, Sparkenhoe West (Hinckley and Market Bosworth) and Sparkenhoe East.

All Saints is the more traditional one of the two main Anglican churches in Loughborough, the other being Emmanuel Church (1835), which is Evangelical and frequented by many Loughborough University students. Emmanuel has St Mary's, Nanpantan as a sister-church. In Loughborough, there is also The Good Shepherd Church in Shelthorpe and All Saints Thorpe Acre with Dishley.

The Akeley East deanery is headed by a rural dean. The Reverend Wendy Dalrymple, rector of this parish until 2023, served in this role for three years during her tenure.

== Bells ==
The tower contains a ring of ten bells hung for change ringing with a tenor weighing 30 long cwt 2 qr (3,420 lb or 1,550 kg) in Db. The present peal were cast between 1897 and 1899 at the John Taylor Bellfoundry in Loughborough., whose foundry was less than a mile away. The largest four bells are lost wax castings and have intricate patterns cast on to the waist of the bells.

| Bell | Diameter | | Weight | |
| Bell | feet & inches | (metric equivalent) | hundredweights-quarters-pounds | (metric equivalent) |
|---|---|---|---|---|
| Treble | 2 ft 4 in | (711 mm) | 7-1-2 | (369 kg) |
| 2nd | 2 ft 5½ in | (749 mm) | 7-0-21 | (365 kg) |
| 3rd | 2 ft 7½ in | (800 mm) | 7-2-10 | (386 kg) |
| 4th | 2 ft 8½ in | (826 mm) | 7-1-7 | (371 kg) |
| 5th | 2 ft 10 in | (864 mm) | 8-1-13 | (425 kg) |
| 6th | 3 ft 1½ in | (953 mm) | 9-3-3 | (497 kg) |
| 7th | 3 ft 5½ in | (1054 mm) | 12-2-23 | (645 kg) |
| 8th | 3 ft 8 in | (1117 mm) | 15-1-25 | (786 kg) |
| 9th | 4 ft 1 in | (1245 mm) | 20-3-6 | (1057 kg) |
| Tenor | 4 ft 7 in | (1397 mm) | 30-2-0 | (1549 kg) |

== Music ==
=== Director of Mission through Music ===
- Emma Trounson, B.A. University of Bristol, M.A. Royal Welsh College of Music and Drama, Cardiff : 2019–2022

=== Director of Music ===
- Simon Headley: 2023-present

=== Musical ensembles ===
The church has a rich musical tradition with a range of music groups being active over time. Recent years have seen the below groups, as of 2026 only the Adult Choir is active.

- Adult choir
- Children's choir
- All-Age Music Group
- Contemporary Collective
- Taize Musicians

== Organ ==
The church contains a 2-manual pipe organ. It was installed in 1966 by Henry Willis. It uses much pipework from a redundant organ from Bridgway Hall in Nottingham. A specification of the organ can be found on the National Pipe Organ Register.

=== Organists ===
- John Baptist Cramer 1838–1877
- Dr. Charles Hage Briggs 1878 - 1902
- R. T. Bedford 1903–1917
- C. Milton-Bill 1917–1919 (afterwards organist of Holy Trinity Church, Swansea).
- Miss Rigg 1920– ????
- Albert Ernest Barton Hart 1924–1960s
- David Briers 1970s
- Dr. Peter J. Underwood, M.A. [Downing, Cambridge], M.Mus. [London], Ph.D. [Birmingham], FRCO (CHM), FTCL, LRAM, ARCM, ADCM: 1985–2017
- David Cowen, M.A. [St Peter's, Oxford], FRCO, LRSM, DipNSC: 2017–2018 (Acting)
- Simon Headley, B.A. [University of Central England], ARCO: (principal organist) 2019–Present

== Loughborough Parish Library ==
The surviving parish library is largely the creation of the Reverend James Bickham, who arrived at the rectory of Loughborough in 1761 bringing with him a large personal library. At his death in 1785, he bequeathed 641 titles to the parish (and two volumes of Milton’s prose to the Bishop of Worcester).

Of those 641 titles, 420 have survived.
