= Woodbrook Vale School =

Coordinates: 52°44′56″N 01°13′04″W

Location
- Grasmere Road; Loughborough, Leicestershire, LE11 2ST; England

Information
- Type: Academy
- Motto: Aspire Enjoy Succeed
- Department for Education URN: 137401 Tables
- Ofsted: Reports
- Headteacher: Rachael Fraser
- Gender: Coeducational
- Age: 11 to 16
- Colours: Blue and Green
- Website: http://www.wbvs.co.uk/

Woodbrook Vale School is a coeducational secondary school situated on Grasmere Road in Loughborough, Leicestershire, England. It is a state school with academy status and has around 800 pupils on roll.

The main partner primary schools are Beacon Academy, Mountfields Lodge, Outwoods Edge and Holywell.

Its headteacher is Ms. Rachael Fraser with Mr. Paul Hynes and Mr Peter Hayes as Deputy Heads. Mr. Dave Green is the School Business Manager.

The School is currently rated 'good' by Ofsted as of February 2019. From the evidence Ofsted gathered during this short inspection, “the school has demonstrated strong practice and marked improvement in specific areas. This may indicate that the school has improved significantly overall.” Ofsted recommended that the school be re-inspected within the next 24 months with a full inspection as it may have moved closer to the ‘Outstanding’ category.
