= A511 road =

Road in Leicestershire and Derbyshire

A511

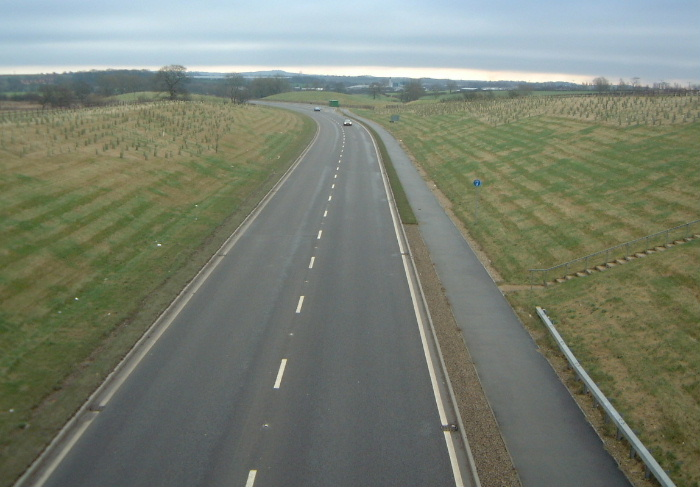

Route information
- Length: 21 mi (34 km)

Major junctions
- West end: M1 Junction 22 and A50 near Markfield
- East end: A50 near Foston

Location
- Country: United Kingdom
- Primary destinations: Bardon; Coalville; Ashby; Burton upon Trent

Road network
- Roads in the United Kingdom; Motorways; A and B road zones
← A510	→ A512

The A511 road is a 21-mile (34 km) stretch of mainly single-carriageway road which runs northwest from Markfield in Leicestershire, England to Foston in South Derbyshire.

It links the towns of Coalville, Ashby-de-la-Zouch and Burton upon Trent. It has a junction with the dual-carriageway A42 at Ashby, and with the non-trunk A514 road east of Swadlincote. The A511 passes under the dual-carriageway A38 at Burton, but has no direct junction with that major route.

The A511 was originally part of the A50 route, which it became from its M1 junction east to Leicester, but it was redesignated when the dual-carriageway Derby bypass section of the A50 was constructed from junction 24a of the M1 west to the current A50/A511 junction.

An earlier A511 was the route from Atherstone, Warwickshire, to Burton upon Trent, Staffordshire, via Twycross and Appleby Magna in Leicestershire and Netherseal in Derbyshire. The stretch from Atherstone to Twycross became part of the B4116 when the rest of the route was renumbered A444, along with the Nuneaton to Twycross route, which was originally the B584.
