= Loughborough Canal Festival =

Coordinates: 52.7764°N 1.2126°W

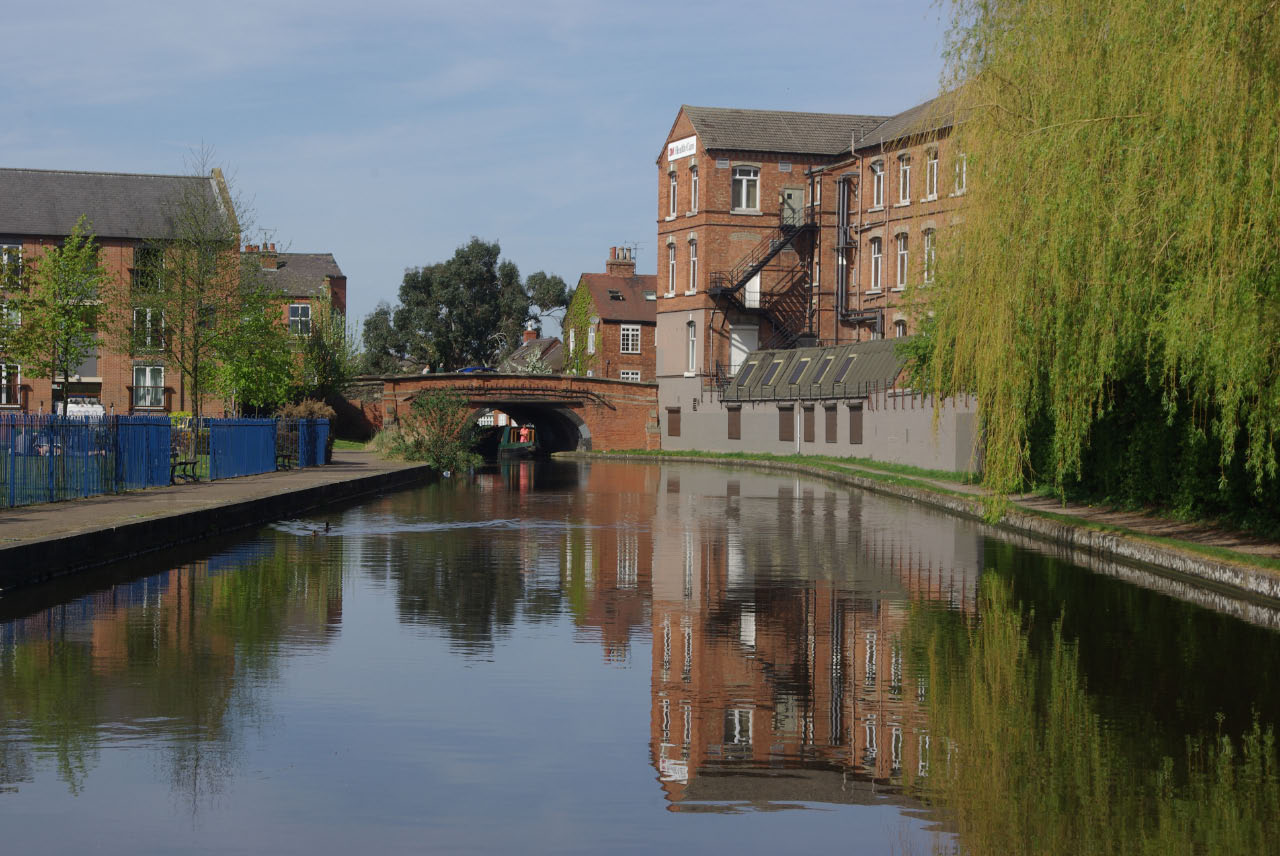
The Grand Union Canal passes through Loughborough

The Loughborough Canal and Boat Festival was an annual event that was held in Loughborough, England, every year from 1997 to 2014, every year since except for 2001 due to that year's foot and mouth crisis.

The Canal and Boat festival was started as part of a campaign by the Loughborough Echo in 1997 to draw attention to redevelopment plans which would have involved the infilling of part of the Canal System. The plans by Charnwood Borough Council were subsequently abandoned.

The festival was centred on a location known as Chain Bridge in Loughborough. This point is the intersection of the Loughborough Navigation, the Leicester Navigation and Loughborough Wharf of the Grand Union Canal.

The fair typically ran for the first weekend in May of each year and attracted boaters from around the country, many arriving a week earlier to secure moorings. During the weekend there were various stalls providing food, drink, music, entertainment and demonstrations. On the Saturday night the boats were illuminated.

The festival was the largest to be held in the Midlands with approximately 10,000 people attending.
