= John Leek (priest) =

- Died: 1369
- Occupations: Dean and Canons of Windsor from 1362 to 1369

John Leek (died 1369) was a Canon of Windsor from 1362 to 1369.

== Career ==
He was appointed:

- Dean in the King's Chapel
- Rector of Yardley Hastings (diocese of Lincoln) 1358
- Rector of All Saints Church, Loughborough 1349 – 1353 and 1358 - 1369
- Rector of Little Gelham (or Yeldham) (diocese of London)
- Prebendary of Somerley in Chichester until 1366

He was appointed to the third stall in St George's Chapel, Windsor Castle in 1362 and held the canonry until 1369.
