= Loughborough =

Town in Leicestershire, England

Coordinates: 52°46′21″N 01°12′28″W

- Town
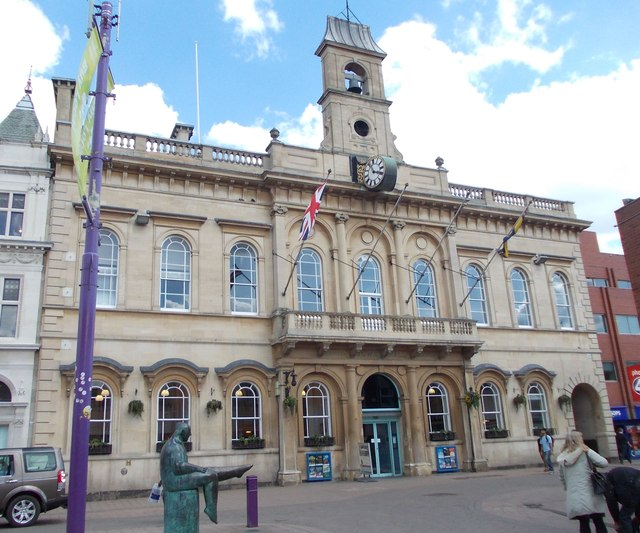
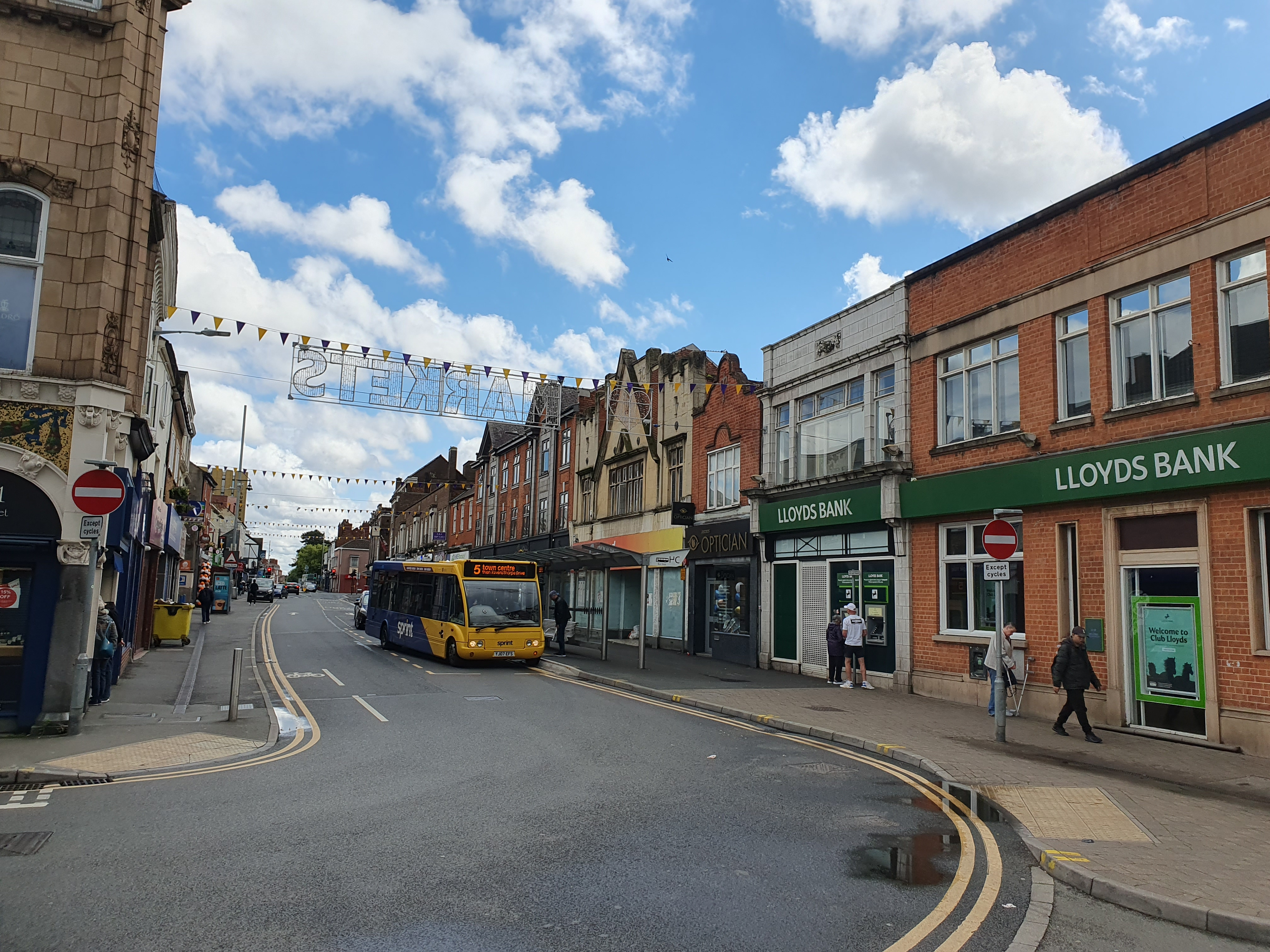
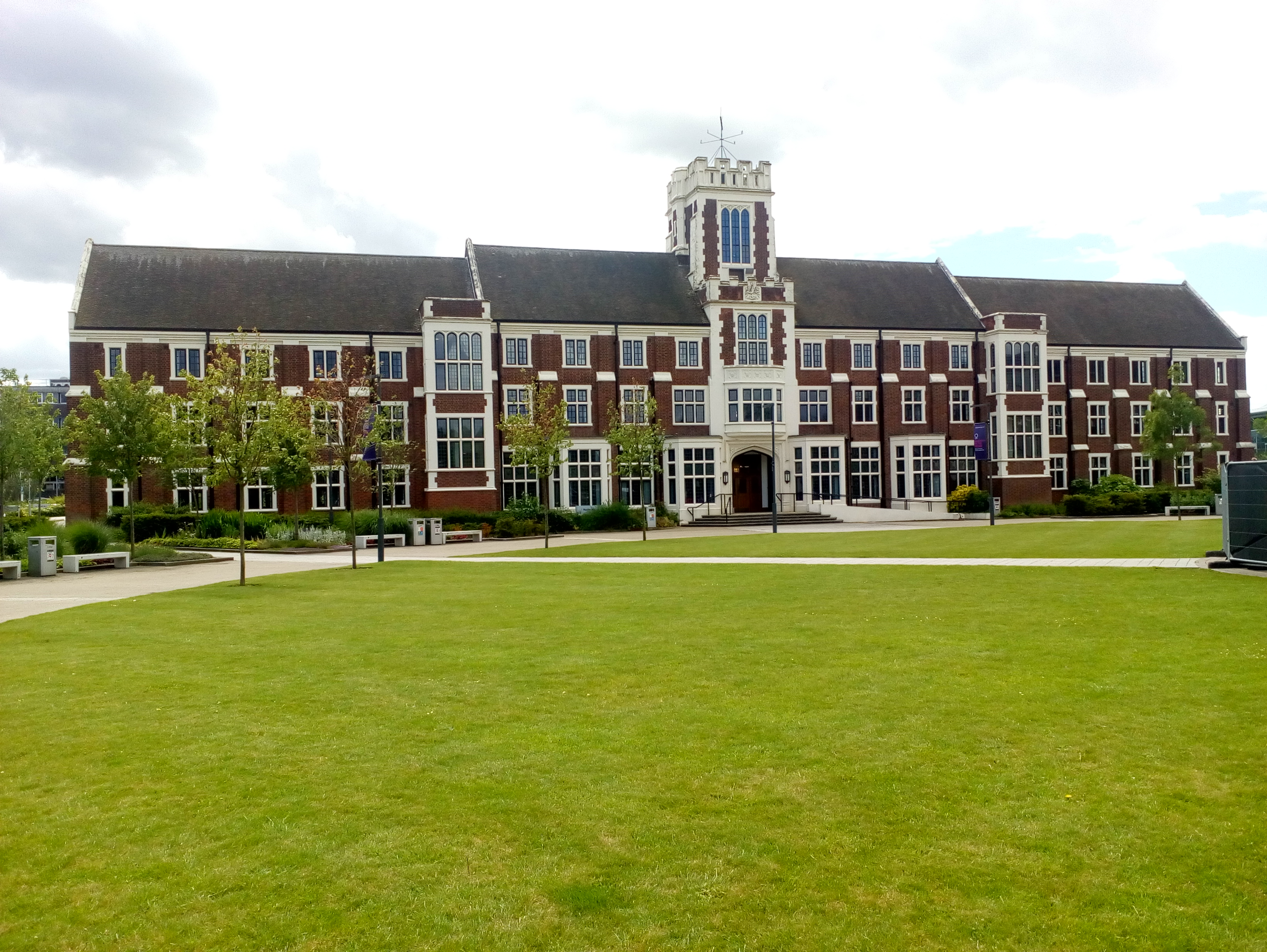
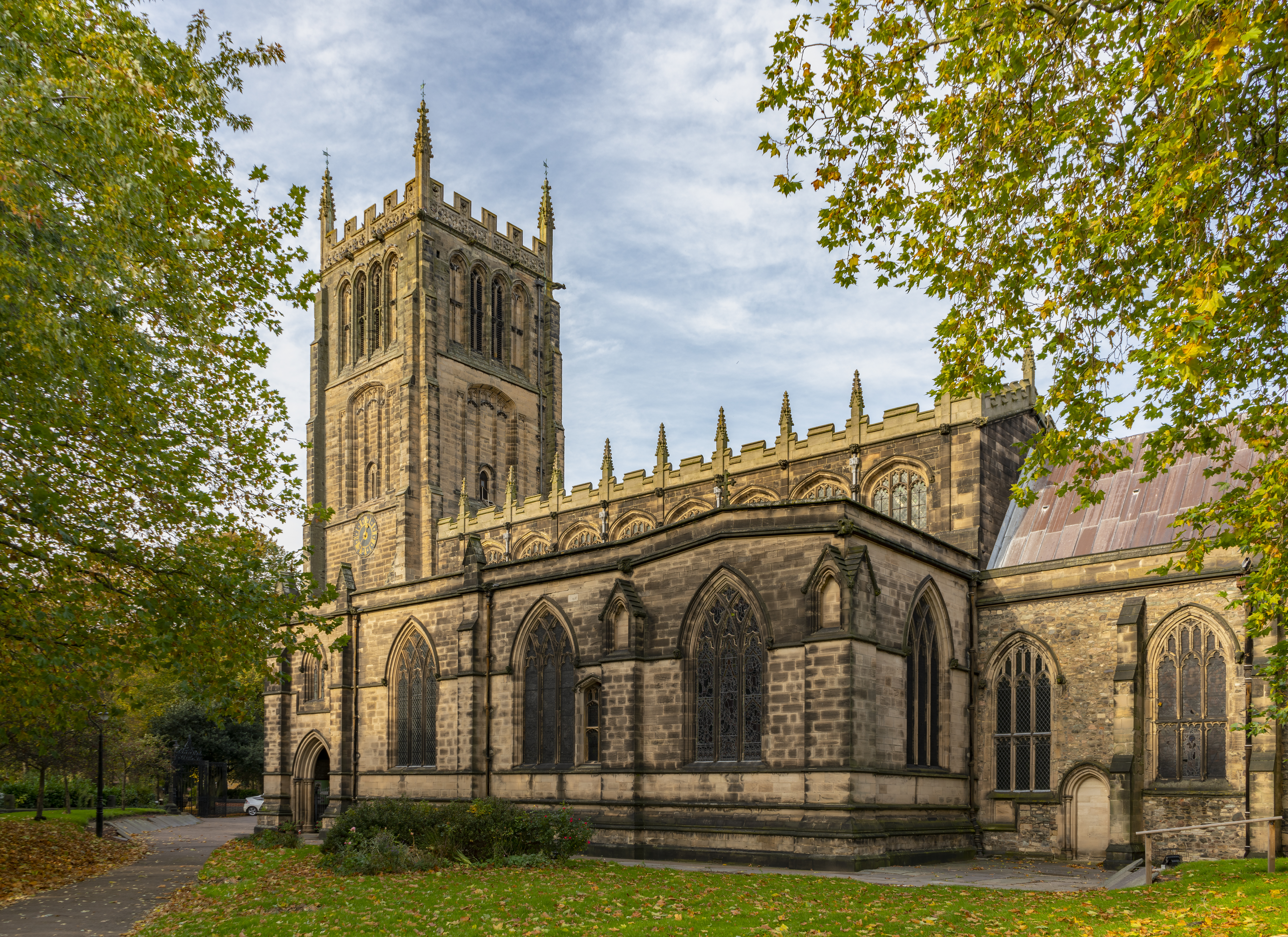
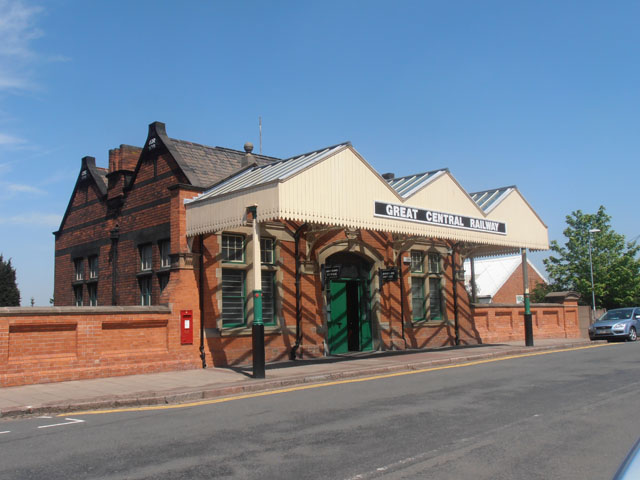
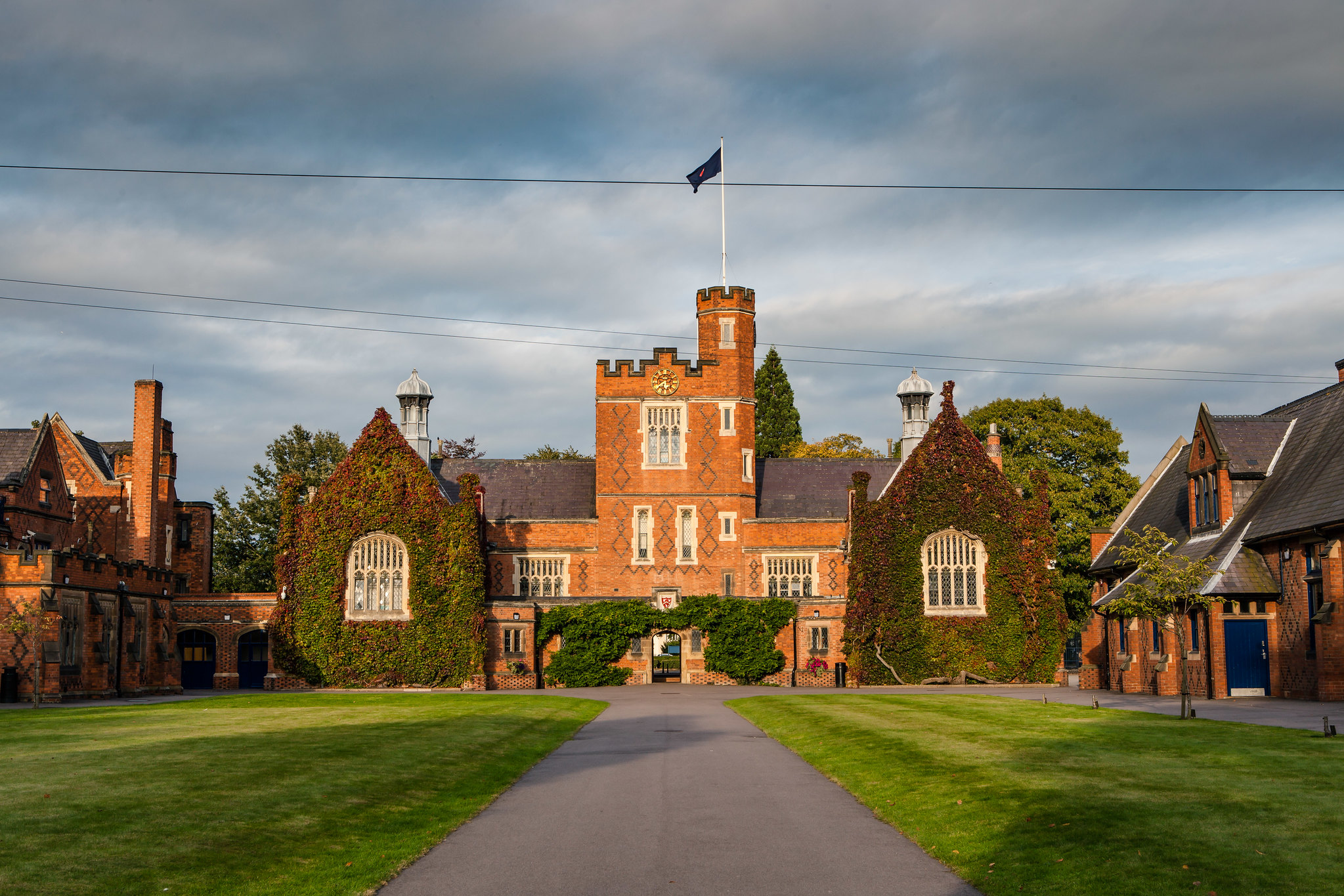
- Town Hall High Street University All Saints Church Great Central Railway Loughborough Grammar School

- Location within Leicestershire
- Population: 64,884 (2021 Census Ward Profile)
- OS grid reference: SK5319
- District: Charnwood
- Shire county: Leicestershire
- Region: East Midlands
- Country: England
- Sovereign state: United Kingdom
- Areas of the town: List: Ashby; Dishley Hathern and Thorpe Acre; Garendon; Hastings; Hathern; Lemyngton; Nanpantan; Outwoods; Shelthorpe; Southfields; Storer; Thorpe Acre; Woodthorpe
- Post town: LOUGHBOROUGH
- Postcode district: LE11
- Dialling code: 01509
- Police: Leicestershire
- Fire: Leicestershire
- Ambulance: East Midlands
- UK Parliament: Loughborough
- Website: https://www.charnwood.gov.uk/

Loughborough (/ˈlʌfbərə/ LUF-bər-ə) is a market town in the Charnwood borough of Leicestershire, England. It is the administrative centre of Charnwood Borough Council and, in the United Kingdom 2021 census, the town's built-up area had a population of 64,884.

It is the second largest settlement in the county after Leicester; it lies close to the Nottinghamshire border and is located near Leicester, Nottingham and Derby. It is notable for its university, marketplace and fair. Loughborough is home to the world's largest, and the UK's only, bell foundry, John Taylor Bellfounders.

== History ==
=== Medieval ===
The earliest reference to Loughborough occurs in the Domesday Book of 1086, which calls it Lucteburne. It appears as Lucteburga in a charter from the reign of Henry II, and as Luchteburc in the Pipe Rolls of 1186. The name is of Old English origin and means "Luhhede's burh or fortified place".

Loughborough Grammar School was established in the Parish Church in 1495, by money left in the will of Thomas Burton, a wealthy local wool merchant. It is one of the oldest independent schools in England.

=== Industrialisation ===
The first sign of industrialisation in the district came in the early 19th century, when John Heathcoat, an inventor from Derbyshire, patented in 1809 an improvement to the warp loom, known as the twisted lace machine, which allowed mitts with a lace-like appearance to be made.

Heathcoat, in partnership with the Nottingham manufacturer Charles Lacy, moved his business from there to the village of Hathern, outside Loughborough. The product of this "Loughborough machine" came to be known as English net or bobbinet. However, the factory was attacked in 1816 by Luddites thought to be in the pay of Nottingham competitors and 55 frames were destroyed. This prompted Heathcoat to move his business to a disused wool mill in Tiverton, Devon.

In 1888, a charter of incorporation was obtained, allowing a mayor and corporation to be elected. The population increased from 11,000 to 25,000 in the following decade.

Among the factories established were Robert Taylor's bell foundry John Taylor & Co and the Falcon works, which produced steam locomotives and then motor cars, before it was taken over by Brush Electrical Machines. In 1897, Herbert Morris set up a factory in the Empress Works in Moor Lane which become one of the foremost crane manufacturers by the mid-20th century.

There was strong municipal investment; a new sewage works in 1895, then a waterworks in Blackbrook and a power station in Bridge Street in 1899. The corporation took over the Loughborough Gas Company in 1900.

=== Tourism ===
In 1841, Loughborough was the destination for the first package tour, organised by Thomas Cook for a temperance group from Leicester.

=== Modern history ===
As Loughborough grew in the 20th century, it gained new suburbs. Thorpe Acre, in the north-west of the town, was a hamlet of about twenty dwellings until the mid-20th century. Several earlier survivors include the 19th-century All Saints Church; Thorpe Acre with Dishley, built in 1845 and extended in 1968; and a hostelry, The Plough Inn. The population is counted into the Loughborough–Garendon Ward of Charnwood Council. Many roads there are named after poets. After World War II, some of Thorpe Acre developed further, mainly in the 1950s for employees of Brush Engineering Works, with 100 dwellings built of no-fines concrete. In the 1960s and early 1970s, Thorpe Acre gained a new estate that subsumed the old village. Two of Loughborough's secondary schools, Charnwood College and De Lisle College, lie on its bounds, as does Garendon Park, a large deer park from the 18th century. The original Dishley, off Derby Road, was heavily developed along with Thorpe Acre in the 1970s. Dishley Church in Derby Road is now in ruins. The agriculturalist Robert Bakewell (1726–1795) is buried there.

Shelthorpe and surrounding area are new suburbs in the south of Loughborough. Work on the original Shelthorpe started in 1929, but was halted by World War II and resumed in 1946. The centre of Shelthorpe has a wide variety of shops, including a Tesco Extra.

The Hazel Road and Fairmeadows Way estates to the west of Shelthorpe and the south of the university date from the 1970s. They stretch from Holywell Drive to Hazel Road. Rainbows Hospice, a children's hospice, and the secondary Woodbrook Vale School are on the edge of the suburb. They were followed by the Haddon Way estates to the south of the estates, and then by Grange Park, just south of Shelthorpe and north-west of the hamlet of Woodthorpe, whose construction began in 2006 after completion of Terry Yardley Way to One Ash Roundabout, the last phase of Loughborough's A6004 ring road.

A planning application to build 30 new homes by William Davis Homes came under criticism in 2018 from residents saying that they had been promised public amenities like shops and a place of worship, but were living on "a construction site"; the site was originally intended to have shops, a church, community centre and health centre built on it. Despite the criticism, the borough council approved the plans.

After hosting two successful vegan markets in 2022, Charnwood Borough Council initiated three vegan markets to be held in Market Place in March, May and October 2023.

== Geography ==
=== Climate ===
Like most of the British Isles, Loughborough experiences a maritime climate with cool summers and mild winters. The nearest Met Office weather station is at Sutton Bonington, in Nottinghamshire, located 5 miles (8.0 km) due north of the town centre. The highest temperature recorded in that area was 36.0 °C (96.8 °F) on 25 July 2019.

=== Demography ===
At the 2021 census, Loughborough's urban area had a population of 64,884; the ethnicity and religious composition of the ward was:

Loughborough: Ethnicity: 2021 Census
Ethnic group	Population	%
White	49,400	76.2%
Asian or Asian British	10,191	15.7%
Mixed	2,140	3.3%
Black or Black British	1,878	2.9%
Other Ethnic Group	750	1.2%
Arab	489	0.8%
Total	64,884	100%

The religious composition of the ward at the 2021 Census was recorded as:

Loughborough: Religion: 2021 Census
Religious	Population	%
Irreligious	27,205	45.3%
Christian	23,737	39.5%
Muslim	4,179	7%
Hindu	3,684	6.1%
Sikh	461	0.8%
Other religion	381	0.6%
Buddhist	321	0.5%
Jewish	65	0.3%
Total	64,884	100%

== Economy ==
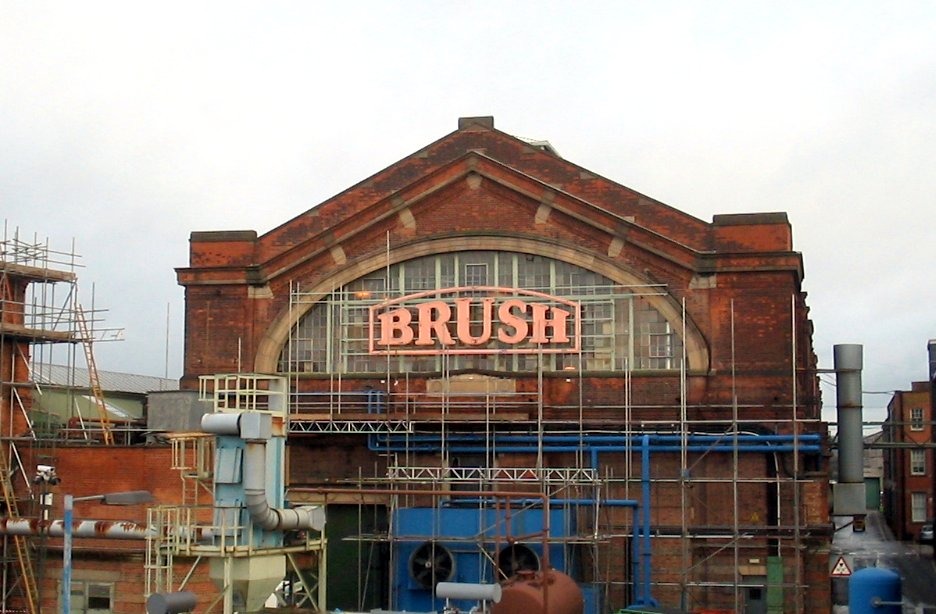
The Brush engineering works

Brush Traction, a manufacturer of railway locomotives, is located in the town, adjacent to the Midland railway station.

The centre of Loughborough's shopping area is the pedestrianised Market Place and Market Street, which maintain several original art deco buildings, such as the building that currently houses the town's Odeon cinema. A large outdoor market is held in the Market Place every Thursday and Saturday. There is a monthly farmers' market. The first mention of a market in Loughborough is in 1221.

The Rushes shopping centre has been built on the site of the former bus station and is occupied by national chains. The Rushes is linked to the town centre area by Churchgate and Churchgate Mews; the latter has independent shops.

A major new development, the Eastern Gateway, which developed the area around the railway station with a new road and new housing, was completed in 2013 for £20 million.

Pedestrianisation of the town centre was completed in November 2014; the scheme is intended to improve the economy within the town centre and reduce pollution from traffic congestion.

A new Cineworld cinema complex with several restaurants on Baxter Gate, on the site of the former General Hospital, was completed in 2016; but closed in 2024.

== Education ==
=== Schools ===
==== Loughborough Schools Foundation ====
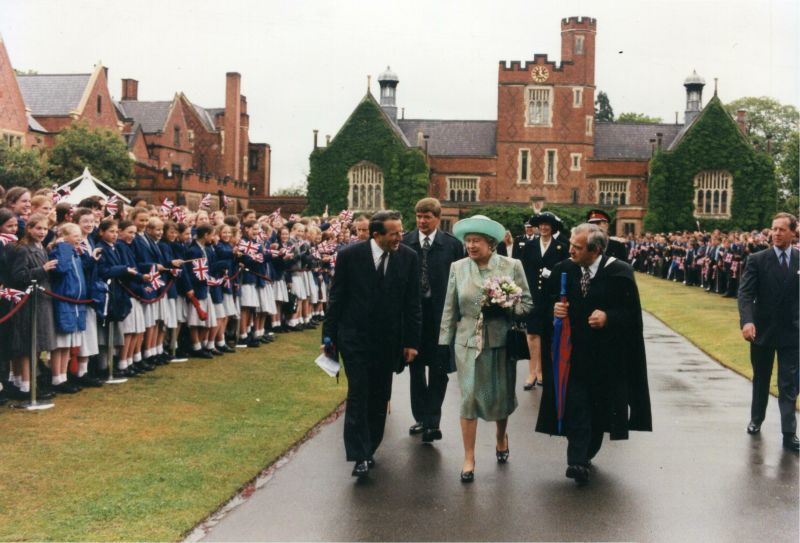
Queen Elizabeth II walking down the Loughborough Grammar School quad

The Loughborough Schools Foundation is a charitable collective of three independent schools: Loughborough Grammar School, Loughborough High School and Fairfield Preparatory School.

Loughborough Grammar School is an all-boys day and boarding school for students aged 10–18. Founded in 1495 with money left in the will of Thomas Burton, it is one of the oldest schools in the country and has been a member of the Headmasters' and Headmistresses' Conference since 1962.

Loughborough High School is an all-girls day school for students aged 11–18 founded in 1850, and Fairfield Preparatory School is a co-educational preparatory school for children aged 3–11. The schools share approximately 110 acres of land, including a main campus in central Loughborough and a 70-acre sports field in nearby Quorn.

Whilst they are separate schools in their own right, they share facilities, some sixth-form classes, and extracurricular activities such as the Combined Cadet Force. All three schools were judged as 'excellent' in all categories by the Independent Schools Inspectorate in 2021.

Loughborough Amherst School (formerly Our Lady's Convent School), a co-educational day and boarding school providing all-through education from ages 4–18, closed on 4 July 2025 due to financial difficulties. It was also part of the foundation.

==== State schools ====
There are also multiple state secondary schools and sixth forms within Loughborough. These include Woodbrook Vale School, Limehurst Academy, Charnwood College, and De Lisle College, with the latter two also providing a sixth form.

=== Tertiary education ===
==== Loughborough University ====
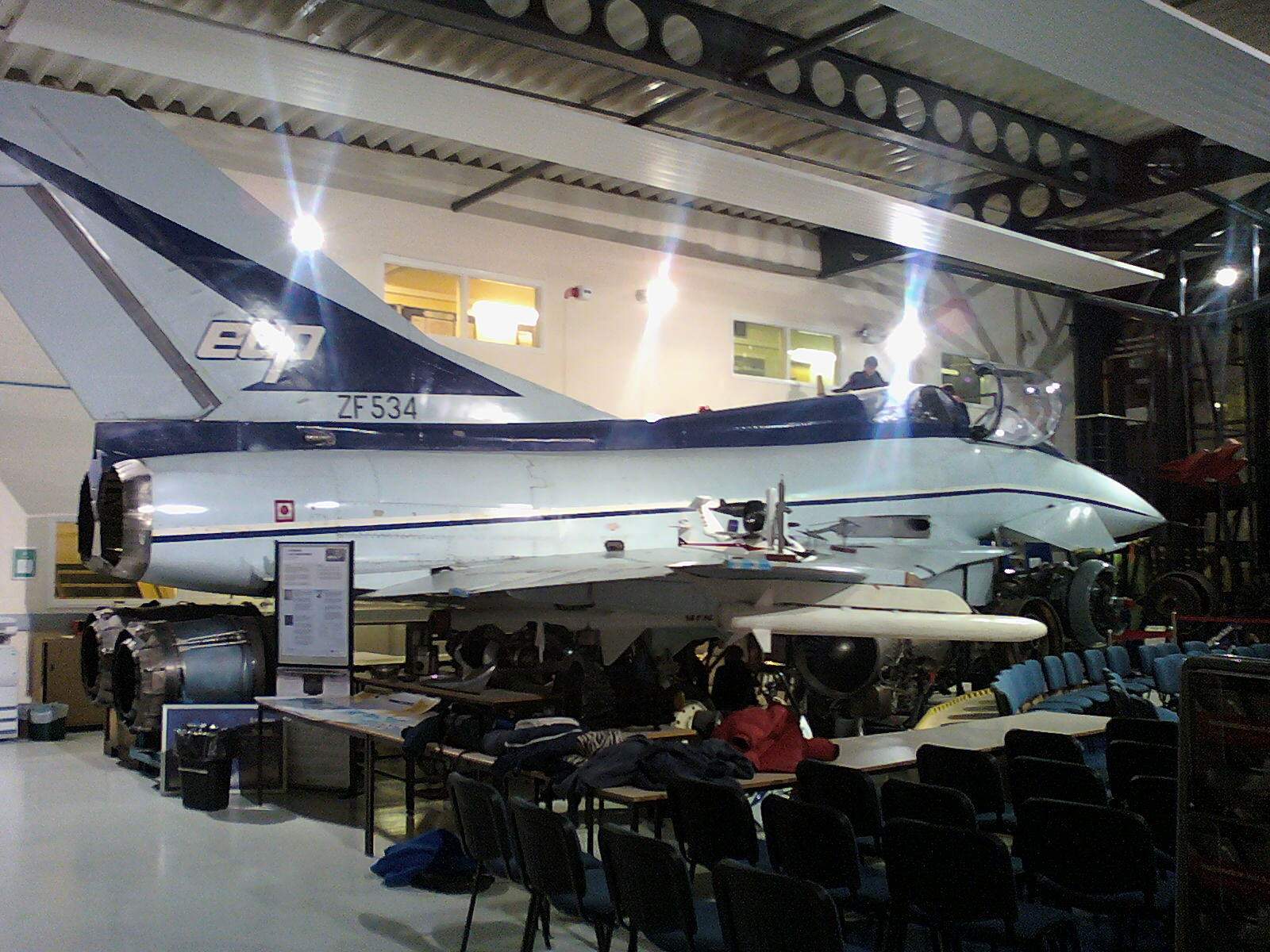
The British Aerospace EAP at Loughborough University

In 2026, the university was ranked 9th by The Guardian University Guide, with the university ranking in the top 10 for business and management, and criminology. Globally, the university was ranked 203rd by the QS World University Ranking in 2026, scoring particularly highly in global engagement and sustainability, representing the university's highest ever rankings.

It is especially renowned for sport, having been ranked the world's best university for sports-related subjects for ten consecutive years between 2017 and 2026. Over a hundred students from the university competed at the 2024 Summer Olympic and Paralympic Games, winning a total of 35 medals, including 11 gold medals.

==== Loughborough College ====
Loughborough College is the second biggest education establishment in the town, after the university, offering further education and vocational courses. It was established in 1909 and has over 12,000 full and part-time students.

==== RNIB College, Loughborough ====
RNIB College, Loughborough, caters for those over 16 with a wide range of disabilities, seeking access to education, employment and independent living.

=== Uniformed youth organisations ===
Loughborough has a variety of uniformed youth organisations, with several Scout and Girl Guide units, Girls' and Boys' Brigades, units from the cadet forces (Air Training Corps, Army Cadet Force, Sea Cadet Corps, and Combined Cadet Force at Loughborough Grammar School), a St John Ambulance Cadet unit and a cadet programme run by the local Fire and Rescue Service. Since November 2015, Loughborough has had a Volunteer Police Cadet unit based at Loughborough College.

== Transport ==
=== Railway ===
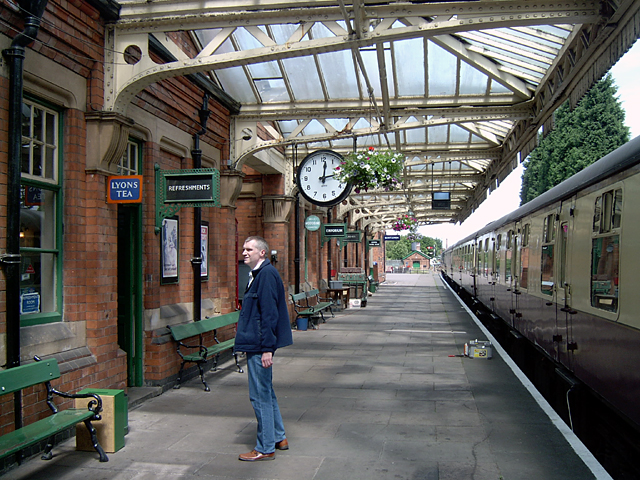
Loughborough Central railway station

Loughborough is the main line station that serves the town. East Midlands Railway operates all passenger services that serve the station, on two routes:

- The Midland Main Line between London St Pancras, Nottingham and Sheffield; intermediate locations include Derby, Leicester, Market Harborough and Kettering. The link to London is half-hourly and provides a link to Europe, via Eurostar. Leicester and Derby stations allow transfers to CrossCountry trains running between the north-east of Scotland and the south-west of England.
- Services between Leicester and Lincoln; alternate services continue to Grimsby or Cleethorpes.

At one time, there were three railway routes to the town: the still-operating Midland Main Line, the Great Central Railway that closed as a result of the Beeching cuts, and a branch line from Nuneaton that was part of the London & North Western Railway. Loughborough Central served the Great Central Railway. It was opened on 15 March 1899 and closed in 1969.

==== Heritage ====
Central station was reopened in March 1974, as part of the Great Central heritage railway. It is operated largely by volunteers. Trains run every weekend of the year and on bank holidays, as well as daily during the summer.

The railway is split into two sections north and south of Loughborough. Central station is the northern terminus of the southern section of the railway and services run daily. As of 2017, there were plans to fill the Loughborough Gap and link the two halves of the railway again. Thus, a new bridge was installed over the Midland Main Line, the A60 and the Grand Union Canal. Work is now progressing on restoring another bridge over the car park of an industrial estate.

Station	Part of line	Serving area
Ruddington Transport Centre	Nottingham main line	Ruddington
Rushcliffe Halt	Nottingham main line	East Leake (British Gypsum)
Loughborough Central	Leicester main line	Loughborough
Quorn & Woodhouse	Leicester main line	Quorn, Woodhouse
Rothley	Leicester main line	Rothley
Nunckley Hill	Mountsorrel branch line	Mountsorrel
Mountsorrel Halt	Mountsorrel branch line	Mountsorrel
Belgrave & Birstall (Leicester North)	Leicester main line	Birstall

=== Roads ===
Loughborough lies at the crossroads of three main roads, two of which begin in the town:

- The A6 main road begins at Luton before running north through Bedford, Leicester, Derby, Manchester and ending at Carlisle.
- The A60 begins in Loughborough and goes north to Nottingham, Mansfield and Worksop.
- The A512 begins in Loughborough and runs west towards the M1, Shepshed and Ashby-de-la-Zouch, while the A6004, which was originally proposed as a bypass for Loughborough, runs from just south of the town around the western and northern suburbs of Loughborough, ending near the railway station at the A60.

Other signed routes are the B589, running between the A6 and the A60, and the B5350, running between the A6 and the A6004.

The M1's junction 23 lies just to the west of Loughborough. The north of the town can be accessed from junction 24, travelling through Kegworth and Hathern on the A6 road and the south-west of the town from Junction 22, via Copt Oak and the small hamlet of Nanpantan.

=== Buses ===
Bus services in and around Loughborough are operated by Arriva East Midlands, Centrebus, Kinchbus and Nottingham City Transport.

Buses around Loughborough town centre depart from on-street stops on various streets around the town centre. Until around 2001, some routes were operated from a bus station near Fennel Street; however, that has since been demolished as part of a town centre regeneration to make way for the shopping centre, The Rushes.

=== Waterways ===
The river Soar passes by to the east of the town. Navigation north towards the Trent was achieved in 1778 by the Loughborough Navigation, which terminates at Loughborough Wharf between Derby Road and Bridge Street. Subsequently, the Leicester Navigation was constructed, connecting to the Loughborough Navigation at Chain Bridge and to the River Soar south of the town. Both form part of the Grand Union Canal.

The now-derelict Charnwood Forest Canal once linked Nanpantan (on the west side of Loughborough) with Thringstone, with goods being carried into the town by a horse-drawn wagonway.

== Culture ==
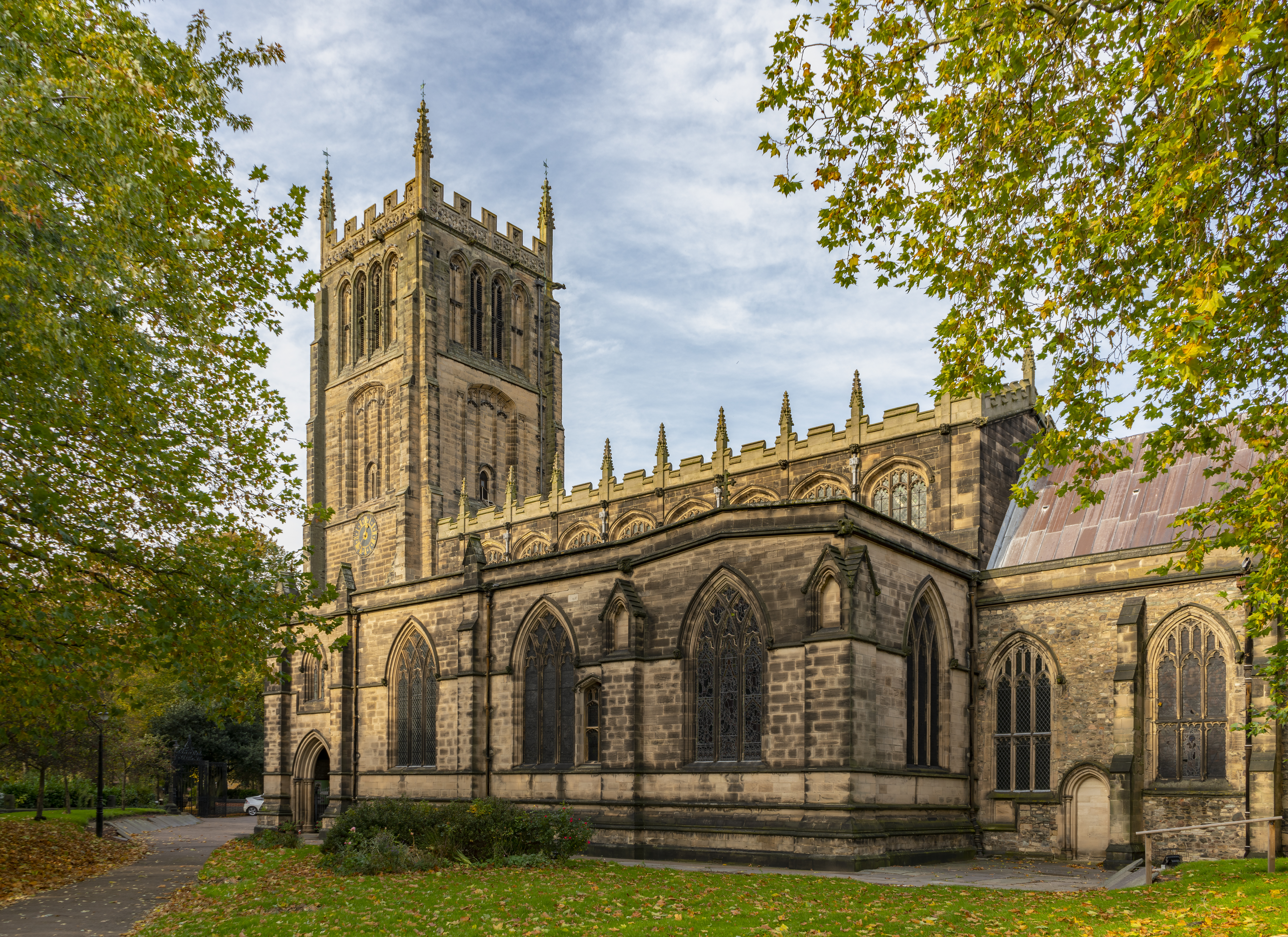
Loughborough Parish Church

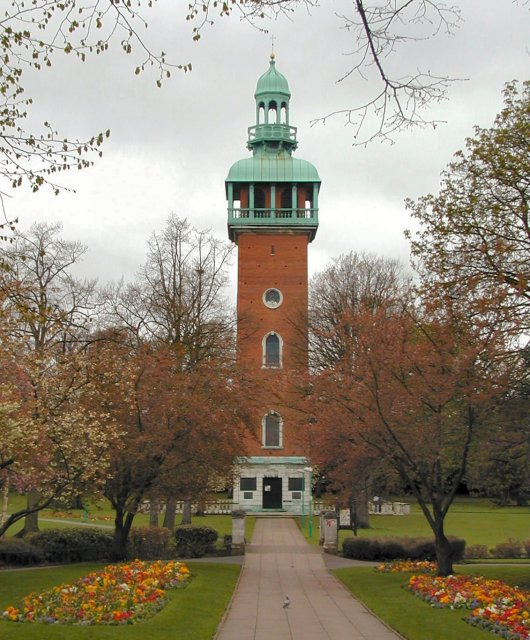
Loughborough Carillon

Loughborough has five museums, the largest being the centrally located Charnwood Museum, which houses a range of exhibits reflecting the natural history, geology, industry and history of the area. Nearby in Queens Park is the Carillon and War Memorial, home to a small museum of military memorabilia from the First and Second World Wars. Loughborough Library is on Granby Street.

Also to be found in the town centre, near the fine medieval All Saints parish church, is the Old Rectory. Dating back to 1288 the remaining portion of the Great Hall has been restored and houses a small museum run by the Loughborough Archaeological and Historical Society.

Loughborough has, for more than a century, been the home of John Taylor & Co, bell founders. The firm's Bellfoundry Museum on two floors tells the story of bell-making over the centuries. The recording of the tolling bell at the beginning of "Hells Bells", the first track on AC/DC's 1980 album Back in Black was made on a quarter-weight near replica of the Denison bell in the Carillon war memorial. The bell founders has produced bells such as Great Paul, the largest bell in the country at St Paul's Cathedral; Big Peter, the third largest bell in the country, at York Minster; bells for New York's Saint Thomas Church; Sydney's St Andrew's Cathedral; Cape Town's City Hall; and Ann Arbor's Burton Memorial Tower.

There is a museum at the former Great Central Railway station, illustrating the history of the railway from its earliest days up to its present state as a double-tracked preserved heritage railway.

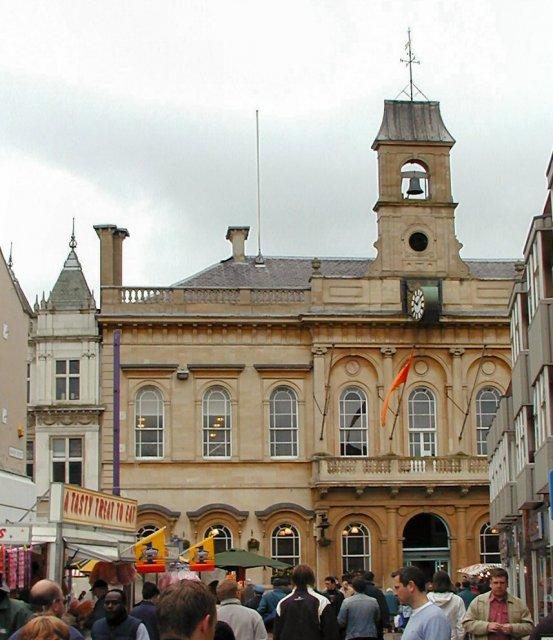
The town hall

Although Loughborough has no dedicated art gallery, fine sculpture can be found in the town's environs, including those installed from a local artist in commemoration of the First World War Centenary outside Charnwood Museum, and The Sockman, a bronze statue marking Loughborough's association with the hosiery industry. This can be found in the Market Place near Loughborough Town Hall, which itself contains a number of art works. It is also the venue for concerts, exhibitions, musicals, comedy shows and a Christmas pantomime. Groups make use of the town hall for their shows.

Events are organised by Charnwood Arts, a voluntarily managed and professionally staffed body offering a year-round programme of professional performances across the borough. They include the Picnic In the Park, inaugurated in 1980, which is held in Queens Park in May. Streets Alive, jointly organised by Charnwood Arts and the borough council, takes place at a similar time of year.

The Loughborough Canal Festival, which ran from 1997 to 2014, was an annual event in May centred on Chain Bridge.

Every November, a street fair takes over the centre of the town, closing some roads. The fair runs from Wednesday afternoon until Saturday night and offers rides, amusement arcades, food stands and games. Fairs have been held in Loughborough for centuries, the first official Charter being granted to the Lord of the Manor, Hugh le Despencer, in 1221 by King Henry III. The Fair was then held on St. Peter's Day.

The town has an Odeon cinema designed by Archibald Hurley Robinson in an Art Deco style. There are six screens. The cinema was built in 1914 as the Empire and was remodelled in 1936 by Hurley Robinson as the New Empire Cinema. Over the years it has been named the Palm Court and Ballroom, Empire, Essoldo, Classic, Curzon and Reel. The site of the former Loughborough General Hospital, demolished in 2012, was taken by a Cineworld cinema with eight screens, which opened in 2016 and closed in 2024.

== Media ==
Loughborough's local weekly newspaper is the Loughborough Echo. The town is also served by Leicestershire's daily newspaper, the Leicester Mercury.

The town's local TV coverage is provided by BBC East Midlands and ITV Central, television signals are received from the Waltham TV transmitter.

Local radio stations are BBC Radio Leicester, Capital Midlands, Smooth East Midlands, Hits Radio East Midlands, Fosse107 and community-based station Carillon Radio.

== Sport ==
The town was once home to a professional football club, Loughborough FC, which played at the Athletic Ground and was a member of the Football League in the late 19th century. Loughborough Dynamo of the Northern Premier League Division One South East (Level 8 of the men's football pyramid), Loughborough University of the United Counties League Premier Division (Level 9 of the men's football pyramid) and women's team Loughborough Foxes of the FA Women's National League North (Level 3 of the women's football pyramid) are the most prominent football teams in the town currently.

Cricket is prominent, with the Old Contemptibles, Loughborough Town CC, Loughborough Outwoods CC, Loughborough Carillon CC, Loughborough Carillon Old Boys' CC, Loughborough University Staff CC, Loughborough Greenfields CC and Loughborough Lightning of the semi-professional Women's Cricket Super League representing various standards of cricket in the area. Loughborough Town has since 2000 been the most successful club in the Leicestershire and Rutland Cricket League. The university is home to the ECB National Cricket Academy, used by the England team as their primary training centre.

The town rugby union club, Loughborough RFC, play at Derby Road playing fields. The club was formed in 1891. The university's first XV rugby team, the Loughborough Students RUFC, was promoted to the National One division in 2012, which is the third tier of English rugby.

Other sports teams include the Loughborough Aces (collegiate American football), Loughborough Lightning of the Netball Superleague and Loughborough Hawks, an amateur netball team.

Loughborough Town Swimming Club is based in the town and trains at local venues. London Roar head coach and former swimmer Melanie Marshall resides in the town and is the lead coach at the Loughborough National Swimming Centre.

The tennis tournament Aegon Pro-Series Loughborough is held in Loughborough.

== Notable people ==
Loughborough was the birthplace of the poet and Royalist John Cleveland (1613–1658).

John Paget (1808–1892), an English agriculturist and writer on Hungary, was born here.

The bellfounder John William Taylor (1827-1906) of John Taylor & Co lived and died here. The chemist Arthur Donald Walsh (8 August 1916 – 23 April 1977) was born in Loughborough and attended Loughborough Grammar School. The engineer, physicist and author Charles Denis Mee was born here in 1927.

Other Loughborough natives include Albert Francis Cross, the journalist, author, poet and playwright who was born on Moor Lane on 9 May 1863, the two time Laurence Olivier Award nominated stage actress Nicola Hughes and Coronation Street's Roy Cropper actor David Neilson, and the notorious rock star of the mid-1960s, Viv Prince of the Pretty Things. Bobsleigher and Paratrooper Dean Ward, who won a bronze medal at the 1998 Winter Olympics was born in the town.

Felix Buxton of Basement Jaxx was a pupil at Loughborough Grammar School and son of the one-time vicar of nearby Woodhouse Eaves and Ibstock. The Dundee-born comedian, TV presenter and entertainer Danny Wallace attended Holywell County Primary School. Second World War fighter ace Johnnie Johnson attended Loughborough Grammar School. The high jumper Ben Challenger, son of Showaddywaddy drummer Romeo Challenger, is from Loughborough. The Muslim and Bangladeshi presenter Rizwan Hussain was brought up there. The cultural thinker Mark Fisher, writer of Capitalist Realism: Is There No Alternative (2009), grew up in the town.

Notable sporting graduates of Loughborough University include Sir Clive Woodward, Sebastian Coe, Paula Radcliffe, David Moorcroft, Tanni Grey-Thompson, Monty Panesar, Steve Backley, Jack Kirwan and Lawrie Sanchez.

Professional footballers, Liam Moore and Hamza Choudhury, were both born in the town and have gone on to play in the Premier League with nearby Leicester City. Fred Ainsworth was also born here. England rugby union captain Phil de Glanville was born in the town.

Sue Campbell, Baroness Campbell of Loughborough, current Head of FA Women's football, and Nicky Morgan, Baroness Morgan of Cotes hail from the town.

== Twin towns ==
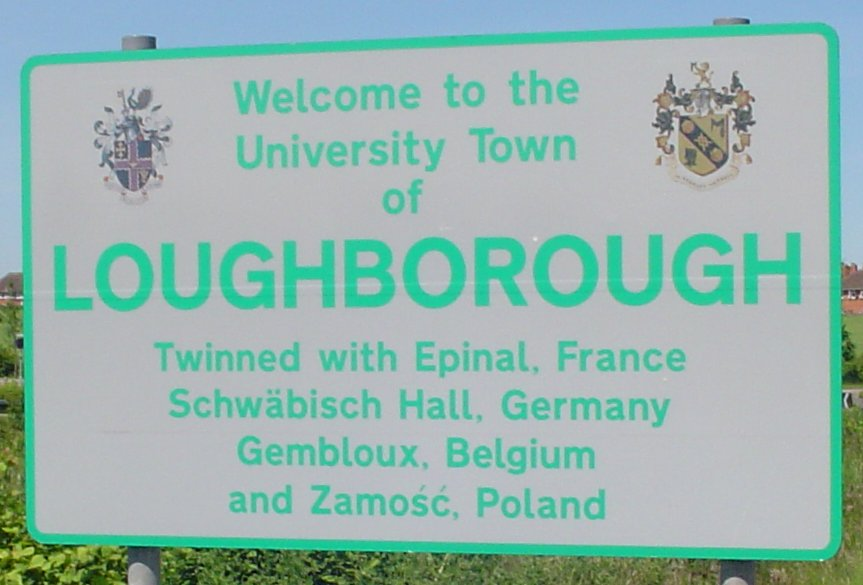
Signpost for Loughborough, naming its twin towns

The town is twinned with:

- Épinal, Vosges, France
- Gembloux, Namur, Belgium
- Schwäbisch Hall, Baden-Württemberg, Germany
- Zamość, Lublin Voivodeship, Poland

Loughborough has a friendship link with Bhavnagar, in Gujarat, India.
