= List of electoral wards in Leicestershire =

This is a list of electoral divisions and wards in the ceremonial county of Leicestershire in the East Midlands. All changes since the re-organisation of local government following the passing of the Local Government Act 1972 are shown. The number of councillors elected for each electoral division or ward is shown in brackets.

== County council ==
=== Leicestershire ===
Electoral Divisions from 1 April 1974 (first election 12 April 1973) to 2 May 1985:

1. Ashby de la Zouch (1)
2. Ashby de la Zouch Rural No. 1 (1)
3. Ashby de la Zouch Rural No. 2 (1)
4. Barrow upon Soar No. 1 (1)
5. Barrow upon Soar No. 2 (1)
6. Barrow upon Soar No. 3 (1)
7. Barrow upon Soar No. 4 (1)
8. Barrow upon Soar No. 5 (1)
9. Barrow upon Soar No. 6 (1)
10. Barrow upon Soar No. 7 (1)
11. Barrow upon Soar No. 8 (1)
12. Billesdon (1)
13. Blaby (1)
14. Braunstone (1)
15. Castle Donington No. 1 (1)
16. Castle Donington No. 2 (1)
17. Coalville No. 1 (1)
18. Coalville No. 2 (1)
19. Coalville No. 3 (1)
20. Coalville No. 4 (North East) (1)
21. Enderby (1)
22. Glen Parva (1)
23. Glenfields (1)
24. Hinckley No. 1 (De Montford & Trini (1)
25. Hinckley No. 2 (Barwell) (1)
26. Hinckley No. 3 (Burbage) (1)
27. Hinckley No. 4 (Castle) (1)
28. Hinckley No. 5 (Clarendon) (1)
29. Hinckley No. 6 (Earl Shilton) (1)
30. Kirby Muxloe (1)
31. Leicester (Abbey) (2)
32. Leicester (Aylestone) (2)
33. Leicester (Belgrave) (2)
34. Leicester (Castle) (2)
35. Leicester (Charnwood) (2)
36. Leicester (De Montford) (2)
37. Leicester (Evington) (2)
38. Leicester (Humberstone) (2)
39. Leicester (Knighton) (2)
40. Leicester (Latimer) (2)
41. Leicester (Newton) (2)
42. Leicester (North Braunstone) (2)
43. Leicester (Spinney Hill) (2)
44. Leicester (St Margarets) (2)
45. Leicester (Westcotes) (2)
46. Leicester (Wycliffe) (2)
47. Loughborough No. 1 (1)
48. Loughborough No. 2 (1)
49. Loughborough No. 3 (Beaumont) (1)
50. Loughborough No. 4 (Burleigh) (1)
51. Loughborough No. 5 (Burton) (1)
52. Lutterworth No. 1 (1)
53. Lutterworth No. 2 (1)
54. Market Bosworth No. 1 (1)
55. Market Bosworth No. 2 (1)
56. Market Bosworth No. 3 (1)
57. Market Bosworth No. 4 (1)
58. Market Harborough No. 1 (1)
59. Market Harborough No. 2 (1)
60. Market Harborough Rural No. 1 (1)
61. Market Harborough Rural No. 2 (1)
62. Melton & Belvoir No. 1 (1)
63. Melton & Belvoir No. 2 (1)
64. Melton & Belvoir No. 3 (1)
65. Melton Mowbray (North) (1)
66. Melton Mowbray (South) (1)
67. Narborough (1)
68. Oadby (North East) (1)
69. Oadby (South West) (1)
70. Oakham (1)
71. Oakham Rural (1)
72. Shepshed (1)
73. Stoney Stanton (1)
74. Uppingham & Ketton (1)
75. Wigston (Central) (1)
76. Wigston (East) (1)
77. Wigston (West) (1)

Electoral Divisions from 2 May 1985 to 5 May 2005:

1. Abbey (1); electoral division abolished in 1997
2. Asfordby (1)
3. Ashby de la Zouch (1)
4. Ashby Woulds (1)
5. Aylestone (1); electoral division abolished in 1997
6. Barrow upon Soar (1)
7. Barwell (1)
8. Beaumont Leys (1); electoral division abolished in 1997
9. Belgrave (1); electoral division abolished in 1997
10. Belvoir (1)
11. Billesdon (1)
12. Birstall (1)
13. Blaby (1)
14. Brabazon (1)
15. Bradgate (1)
16. Braunstone (1)
17. Breedon (1)
18. Broughton Astley (1)
19. Burbage (1)
20. Bushloe (1)
21. Castle (1); electoral division abolished in 1997
22. Castle Donington (1)
23. Charnwood (1); electoral division abolished in 1997
24. Coalville (1)
25. Coleman (1); electoral division abolished in 1997
26. Countesthorpe (1)
27. Crown Hills (1); electoral division abolished in 1997
28. De Montfort (1)
29. Earl Shilton (1)
30. East Gartree (1)
31. East Knighton (1); electoral division abolished in 1997
32. Enderby (1)
33. Evington (1); electoral division abolished in 1997
34. Eyres Monsell (1); electoral division abolished in 1997
35. Fosse (1)
36. Glenfields (1)
37. Groby & Ratby (1)
38. Hollycroft (1)
39. Humberstone (1); electoral division abolished in 1997
40. Ibstock (1)
41. Kirby Muxloe (1)
42. Latimer (1); electoral division abolished in 1997
43. Loughborough Blackbrook (1)
44. Loughborough Central (1)
45. Loughborough College (1)
46. Loughborough Forest (1)
47. Loughborough Shelthorpe (1)
48. Lutterworth (1)
49. Manor (1)
50. Market Bosworth (1)
51. Market Harborough (1)
52. Markfield (1)
53. Meadow Fields (1)
54. Melton Mowbray North (1)
55. Melton Mowbray South (1)
56. Mowmacre (1); electoral division abolished in 1997
57. Narborough (1)
58. New Parks (1); electoral division abolished in 1997
59. North Braunstone (1); electoral division abolished in 1997
60. Oakham (1); electoral division abolished in 1997
61. Rothley (1)
62. Rowley Fields (1); electoral division abolished in 1997
63. Rushey Mead (1); electoral division abolished in 1997
64. Rutland North (1); electoral division abolished in 1997
65. Rutland South (1); electoral division abolished in 1997
66. Saffron (1); electoral division abolished in 1997
67. Shepshed (1)
68. Sileby (1)
69. South Wigston (1)
70. Spinney Hill (1); electoral division abolished in 1997
71. St Augustines (1); electoral division abolished in 1997
72. St Marys (1)
73. Stoney Stanton (1)
74. Stoneygate (1); electoral division abolished in 1997
75. Syston (1)
76. Thurmaston (1)
77. Thurncourt (1); electoral division abolished in 1997
78. Warren Hills (1)
79. West Gartree (1)
80. West Humberstone (1); electoral division abolished in 1997
81. West Knighton (1); electoral division abolished in 1997
82. Westcotes (1); electoral division abolished in 1997
83. Western Park (1); electoral division abolished in 1997
84. Whitwick (1)
85. Wycliffe (1); electoral division abolished in 1997

Electoral Divisions from 5 May 2005 to 4 May 2017:

1. Asfordby (1)
2. Ashby de la Zouch (1)
3. Belvoir (1)
4. Birstall (1)
5. Blaby & Glen Parva (1)
6. Bradgate (1)
7. Braunstone Town (1)
8. Broughton Astley (1)
9. Bruntingthorpe (1)
10. Burbage Castle (2)
11. Castle Donington (1)
12. Coalville (1)
13. Cosby & Countesthorpe (1)
14. Earl Shilton (1)
15. Enderby Meridian (1) †
16. Forest & Measham (1)
17. Gartree (1)
18. Glenfields (1)
19. Groby & Ratby (1)
20. Hinckley (2)
21. Ibstock & Appleby (1)
22. Kirby Muxloe & Leicester Forest East (1) †
23. Launde (1)
24. Loughborough East (1)
25. Loughborough North (1)
26. Loughborough North West (1)
27. Loughborough South (1)
28. Loughborough South West (1)
29. Lutterworth (1)
30. Mallory (1)
31. Market Bosworth (1)
32. Market Harborough East (1)
33. Market Harborough West & Foxton (1)
34. Markfield, Desford & Thornton (1)
35. Melton North (1)
36. Melton South (1)
37. Narborough & Whetstone (1)
38. Oadby (2)
39. Quorn & Barrow (1)
40. Rothley & Mountsorrel (1)
41. Shepshed (1)
42. Sileby & The Wolds (1)
43. Stanton, Croft & Normanton (1)
44. Syston Fosse (1)
45. Syston Ridgeway (1)
46. Thurmaston (1)
47. Valley (1)
48. Warren Hills (1)
49. Whitwick (1)
50. Wigston Bushloe (1)
51. Wigston Poplars (1)
52. Wigston South (1)

† minor boundary changes in 2013

Electoral divisions from 4 May 2017:

1. Ashby de la Zouch (1)
2. Belvoir (1)
3. Birstall (1)
4. Blaby & Glen Parva (1)
5. Bradgate (1)
6. Braunstone (1)
7. Broughton Astley (1)
8. Bruntingthorpe (1)
9. Burbage (1)
10. Castle Donington & Kegworth (1)
11. Coalville North (1)
12. Coalville South (1)
13. Cosby & Countesthorpe (1)
14. De Montfort (1)
15. Earl Shilton (1)
16. East Wigston (1)
17. Enderby & Lubbesthorpe (1)
18. Forest & Measham (1)
19. Gartree (1)
20. Glenfields, Kirby Muxloe & Leicester Forests (2)
21. Groby & Ratby (1)
22. Hollycroft (1)
23. Ibstock & Appleby (1)
24. Launde (1)
25. Loughborough East (1)
26. Loughborough North (1)
27. Loughborough North West (1)
28. Loughborough South (1)
29. Loughborough South West (1)
30. Lutterworth (1)
31. Mallory (1)
32. Market Bosworth (1)
33. Market Harborough East (1)
34. Market Harborough West & Foxton (1)
35. Markfield, Desford & Thornton (1)
36. Melton East (1)
37. Melton West (1)
38. Melton Wolds (1)
39. Narborough & Whetstone (1)
40. North Wigston (1)
41. Oadby (2)
42. Quorn & Barrow (1)
43. Rothley & Mountsorrel (1)
44. Shepshed (1)
45. Sileby & The Wolds (1)
46. South & West Wigston (1)
47. St Marys (1)
48. Stoney Stanton & Croft (1)
49. Syston Fosse (1)
50. Syston Ridgeway (1)
51. Thurmaston Ridgemere (1)
52. Valley (1)
53. Whitwick (1)

== Unitary authority council ==
=== Leicester ===
Wards from 1 April 1974 (first election 7 June 1973) to 5 May 1983:

Wards from 5 May 1983 to 1 May 2003:

Wards from 1 May 2003 to 7 May 2015:

1. Abbey (3)
2. Aylestone (2)
3. Beaumont Leys (3)
4. Belgrave (2)
5. Braunstone Park & Rowley Fields (3)
6. Castle (3)
7. Charnwood (2)
8. Coleman (2)
9. Evington (2)
10. Eyres Monsell (2)
11. Fosse (2)
12. Freemen (2)
13. Humberstone & Hamilton (3)
14. Knighton (3)
15. Latimer (2)
16. New Parks (3)
17. Rushey Mead (3)
18. Spinney Hills (3)
19. Stoneygate (3)
20. Thurncourt (2)
21. Westcotes (2)
22. Western Park (2)

Wards from 7 May 2015 to present:

1. Abbey (3)
2. Aylestone (2)
3. Beaumont Leys (3)
4. Belgrave (3)
5. Braunstone Park & Rowley Fields (3)
6. Castle (3)
7. Evington (3)
8. Eyres Monsell (2)
9. Fosse (2)
10. Humberstone & Hamilton (3)
11. Knighton (3)
12. North Evington (3)
13. Rushey Mead (3)
14. Saffron (2)
15. Spinney Hills (2)
16. Stoneygate (3)
17. Thurncourt (2)
18. Troon (2)
19. Westcotes (2)
20. Western (3)
21. Wycliffe (2)

== District councils ==
=== Blaby ===
Wards from 1 April 1974 (first election 7 June 1973) to 5 May 1983:

Wards from 5 May 1983 to 1 May 2003:

Wards from 1 May 2003 to 4 May 2023:

1. Blaby South (2)
2. Cosby with South Whetstone (2)
3. Countesthorpe (3)
4. Croft Hill (1)
5. Ellis (2)
6. Enderby & St John's (2)
7. Fairestone (2)
8. Forest (3) †
9. Millfield (1)
10. Muxloe (2)
11. Narborough & Littlethorpe (2)
12. Normanton (1)
13. North Whetstone (2)
14. Pastures (2)
15. Ravenhurst & Fosse (3)
16. Saxondale (3)
17. Stanton & Flamville (3)
18. Winstanley (3) †

† minor boundary changes in 2015

Wards from 4 May 2023 to present:

1. Blaby (2)
2. Braunstone Millfield (2)
3. Braunstone Ravenhurst (2)
4. Cosby and South Whetstone (2)
5. Countesthorpe (3)
6. Enderby (2)
7. Fosse Highcross (2)
8. Fosse Normanton (1)
9. Fosse Stoney Cove (2)
10. Glen Parva (2)
11. Glenfield Ellis (2)
12. Glenfield Faire (2)
13. Kirby Muxloe (2)
14. Leicester Forest & Lubbesthorpe (3)
15. Narborough and Littlethorpe (3)
16. North Whetstone (2)
17. Thorpe Astley and St Mary's (2)

=== Charnwood ===
Wards from 1 April 1974 (first election 7 June 1973) to 5 May 1983:

Wards from 5 May 1983 to 1 May 2003:

Wards from 1 May 2003 to present:

1. Anstey (2)
2. Barrow & Sileby West (2)
3. Birstall Wanlip (2)
4. Birstall Watermead (2)
5. East Goscote (1)
6. Forest Bradgate (1)
7. Loughborough Ashby (2)
8. Loughborough Dishley & Hathern (2)
9. Loughborough Garendon (2)
10. Loughborough Hastings (2)
11. Loughborough Lemyngton (2)
12. Loughborough Nanpantan (2)
13. Loughborough Outwoods (2)
14. Loughborough Shelthorpe (2)
15. Loughborough Southfields (2)
16. Loughborough Storer (2)
17. Mountsorrel (2)
18. Queniborough (1)
19. Quorn & Mountsorrel Castle (2)
20. Rothley & Thurcaston (2)
21. Shepshed East (2)
22. Shepshed West (2)
23. Sileby (2)
24. Syston East (2)
25. Syston West (2)
26. The Wolds (1)
27. Thurmaston (3)
28. Wreake Villages (1)

Wards from 4 May 2023 to present:

1. Anstey (2)
2. Barrow upon Soar (2)
3. Birstall East & Wanlip (2)
4. Birstall West (2)
5. Dishley, Hathern & Thorpe Acre (2)
6. Forest Bradgate (1)
7. Loughborough Ashby (3)
8. Loughborough East (3)
9. Loughborough Nanpantan (1)
10. Loughborough Outwoods & Shelthorpe (3)
11. Loughborough Southfields (2)
12. Loughborough Storer (2)
13. Loughborough Woodthorpe (1)
14. Mountsorrel (2)
15. Quorn & Mountsorrel Castle (2)
16. Rothley Brook (3)
17. Shepshed East (2)
18. Shepshed West (2)
19. Sileby & Seagrave (3)
20. South Charnwood (1)
21. Syston (3)
22. The Wolds (1)
23. Thurmaston (3)
24. Wreake Valley (3)

=== Harborough ===
Wards from 1 April 1974 (first election 7 June 1973) to 5 May 1983:

Wards from 5 May 1983 to 1 May 2003:

Wards from 1 May 2003 to 2 May 2019:

1. Billesdon (1)
2. Bosworth (1)
3. Broughton Astley—Astley (1)
4. Broughton Astley—Broughton (1)
5. Broughton Astley—Primethorpe (1)
6. Broughton Astley—Sutton (1)
7. Dunton (1)
8. Fleckney (2)
9. Glen (2)
10. Kibworth (3)
11. Lubenham (1)
12. Lutterworth Brookfield (1)
13. Lutterworth Orchard (1)
14. Lutterworth Springs (1)
15. Lutterworth Swift (1)
16. Market Harborough—Great Bowden & Arden (3)
17. Market Harborough—Little Bowden (2)
18. Market Harborough—Logan (2)
19. Market Harborough—Welland (3)
20. Misterton (1)
21. Nevill (1)
22. Peatling (1)
23. Thurnby & Houghton (3)
24. Tilton (1)
25. Ullesthorpe (1)

Wards from 2 May 2019 to present:

1. Billesdon & Tilton (1)
2. Bosworth (1)
3. Broughton Astley – Primethorpe & Sutton (2)
4. Broughton Astley South & Leire (2)
5. Dunton (1)
6. Fleckney (2)
7. Glen (2)
8. Kibworths (3)
9. Lubenham (1)
10. Lutterworth East (2)
11. Lutterworth West (2)
12. Market Harborough – Great Bowden & Arden (2)
13. Market Harborough – Little Bowden (2)
14. Market Harborough – Logan (2)
15. Market Harborough – Welland (3)
16. Misterton (1)
17. Nevill (1)
18. Thurnby & Houghton (3)
19. Ullesthorp (1)

=== Hinckley and Bosworth ===
Wards from 1 April 1974 (first election 7 June 1973) to 5 May 1983:

Wards from 5 May 1983 to 1 May 2003:

Wards from 1 May 2003 to present:

1. Ambien (1)
2. Barlestone, Nailstone & Osbaston (1)
3. Barwell (3)
4. Burbage St Catherines & Lash Hill (2)
5. Burbage Sketchley & Stretton (3)
6. Cadeby, Carlton & Market Bosworth with Shackerstone (1)
7. Earl Shilton (3)
8. Groby (2)
9. Hinckley Castle (2)
10. Hinckley Clarendon (3)
11. Hinckley De Montfort (3)
12. Hinckley Trinity (2)
13. Markfield, Stanton & Fieldhead (2)
14. Newbold Verdon with Desford & Peckleton (3)
15. Ratby, Bagworth & Thornton (2)
16. Twycross & Witherley with Sheepy (1)

=== Melton ===
Wards from 1 April 1974 (first election 7 June 1973) to 3 May 1979:

Wards from 3 May 1979 to 1 May 2003:

Wards from 1 May 2003 to present:

1. Asfordby (2)
2. Bottesford (2)
3. Croxton Kerrial (1)
4. Frisby-on-the-Wreake (1)
5. Gaddesby (1)
6. Long Clawson & Stathern (2)
7. Melton Craven (2)
8. Melton Dorian (3)
9. Melton Egerton (2)
10. Melton Newport (3)
11. Melton Sysonby (3)
12. Melton Warwick (2)
13. Old Dalby (1)
14. Somerby (1)
15. Waltham-on-the-Wolds (1)
16. Wymondham (1)

=== North West Leicestershire ===
Wards from 1 April 1974 (first election 7 June 1973) to 5 May 1983:

Wards from 5 May 1983 to 1 May 2003:

Wards from 1 May 2003 to 7 May 2015:

1. Appleby (1)
2. Ashby Castle (1)
3. Ashby Holywell (2)
4. Ashby Ivanhoe (2)
5. Bardon (1)
6. Breedon (1)
7. Castle Donington (3)
8. Coalville (2)
9. Greenhill (3)
10. Hugglescote (2)
11. Ibstock & Heather (3)
12. Kegworth & Whatton (2)
13. Measham (2)
14. Moira (2)
15. Oakthorpe & Donisthorpe (1)
16. Ravenstone & Packington (1)
17. Snibston (2)
18. Thringstone (2)
19. Valley (2)
20. Whitwick (3)

Wards from 7 May 2015 to present:

1. Appleby (1)
2. Ashby Castle (1)
3. Ashby Holywell (1)
4. Ashby Ivanhoe (1)
5. Ashby Money Hill (1)
6. Ashby Willesley (1)
7. Ashby Woulds (1)
8. Bardon (1)
9. Blackfordby (1)
10. Broom Leys (1)
11. Castle Donington Castle (1)
12. Castle Donington Central (1)
13. Castle Donington Park (1)
14. Castle Rock (1)
15. Coalville East (1)
16. Coalville West (1)
17. Daleacre Hill (1)
18. Ellistown & Battleflat (1)
19. Greenhill (1)
20. Hermitage (1)
21. Holly Hayes (1)
22. Hugglescote St John’s (1)
23. Hugglescote St Mary’s (1)
24. Ibstock East (1)
25. Ibstock West (1)
26. Kegworth (1)
27. Long Whatton & Diseworth (1)
28. Measham North (1)
29. Measham South (1)
30. Oakthorpe & Donisthorpe (1)
31. Ravenstone & Packington (1)
32. Sence Valley (1)
33. Snibston North (1)
34. Snibston South (1)
35. Thornborough (1)
36. Thringstone (1)
37. Valley (1)
38. Worthington & Breedon (1)

=== Oadby and Wigston ===
Wards from 1 April 1974 (first election 7 June 1973) to 3 May 1979:

Wards from 3 May 1979 to 1 May 2003:

Wards from 1 May 2003 to present:

1. Oadby Brocks Hill (2)
2. Oadby Grange (3)
3. Oadby St Peter's (2)
4. Oadby Uplands (2)
5. Oadby Woodlands (2)
6. South Wigston (3)
7. Wigston All Saints (3)
8. Wigston Meadowcourt (3)
9. Wigston St Wolstan's (3)
10. Wigston Fields (3)

== Electoral wards by constituency ==
Wards as they existed on 1 December 2020.

=== Harborough, Oadby and Wigston ===
Harborough: Glen; Kibworths; Lubenham; Market Harborough – Great Bowden & Arden; Market Harborough – Little Bowden; Market Harborough – Logan; Market Harborough – Welland.

Oadby and Wigston: Oadby Brocks Hill; Oadby Grange; Oadby St Peter's; Oadby Uplands; Oadby Woodlands; South Wigston; Wigston All Saints; Wigston Meadowcourt; Wigston St Wolstan's; Wigston Fields.

=== Hinckley and Bosworth ===
Hinckley and Bosworth: Ambien; Barlestone, Nailstone & Osbaston; Barwell; Burbage St. Catherines & Lash Hill; Burbage Sketchley & Stretton; Cadeby, Carlton & Market Bosworth with Shackerstone; Earl Shilton; Hinckley Castle; Hinckley Clarendon; Hinckley De Montfort; Hinckley Trinity; Newbold Verdon with Desford & Peckleton; Twycross & Witherley with Sheepy.

North West Leicestershire: Appleby; Oakthorpe & Donisthorpe.

=== Leicester East ===
Leicester: Belgrave; Evington (polling districts EVA, EVB, EVC, EVD & EVE); Humberstone & Hamilton; North Evington; Rushey Mead; Thurncourt; Troon.

=== Leicester South ===
Leicester: Castle; Evington (polling district EVF); Eyres Monsell; Knighton; Saffron; Spinney Hills; Stoneygate; Wycliffe.

=== Leicester West ===
Leicester: Abbey; Aylestone; Beaumont Leys; Braunstone Park & Rowley Fields; Fosse; Westcotes; Western.

=== Loughborough ===
Charnwood: Barrow & Sileby West; Loughborough Ashby; Loughborough Dishley & Hathern; Loughborough Garendon; Loughborough Hastings; Loughborough Lemyngton; Loughborough Nanpantan; Loughborough Outwoods; Loughborough Shelthorpe; Loughborough Southfields; Loughborough Storer; Quorn & Mountsorrel Castle; Shepshed East; Shepshed West; The Wolds.

=== Melton and Syston ===
Charnwood: East Goscote; Queniborough; Sileby; Syston East; Syston West; Thurmaston; Wreake Villages.

Melton: Asfordby; Bottesford; Croxton Kerrial; Frisby-on-the-Wreake; Gaddesby; Long Clawson & Stathern; Melton Craven; Melton Dorian; Melton Egerton; Melton Newport; Melton Sysonby; Melton Warwick; Old Dalby; Somerby; Waltham-on-the-Wolds; Wymondham.

=== Mid Leicestershire ===
Blaby: Ellis; Fairestone; Forest; Millfield; Muxloe; Ravenhurst & Fosse; Winstanley.

Charnwood: Anstey; Birstall Wanlip; Birstall Watermead; Forest Bradgate; Mountsorrel; Rothley and Thurcaston.

Hinckley and Bosworth: Groby; Markfield, Stanton & Fieldhead; Ratby, Bagworth & Thornton.

=== North West Leicestershire ===
North West Leicestershire: Ashby Castle; Ashby Holywell; Ashby Ivanhoe; Ashby Money Hill; Ashby Willesley; Ashby Woulds; Bardon; Blackfordby; Broom Leys; Castle Donington Castle; Castle Donington Central; Castle Donington Park; Castle Rock; Coalville East; Coalville West; Daleacre Hill; Ellistown & Battleflat; Greenhill; Hermitage; Holly Hayes; Hugglescote St. John’s; Hugglescote St. Mary’s; Ibstock East; Ibstock West; Kegworth; Long Whatton & Diseworth; Measham North; Measham South; Ravenstone & Packington; Sence Valley; Snibston North; Snibston South; Thornborough; Thringstone; Valley; Worthington & Breedon.

=== Rutland and Stamford (part) ===
Harborough: Billesdon & Tilton; Nevill; Thurnby & Houghton

=== South Leicestershire ===
Blaby: Blaby South; Cosby with South Whetstone; Countesthorpe; Croft Hill; Enderby & St. John’s; Narborough & Littlethorpe; Normanton; North Whetstone; Pastures; Saxondale; Stanton & Flamville.

Harborough: Bosworth; Broughton Astley-Primethorpe & Sutton; Broughton Astley South & Leire; Dunton; Fleckney; Lutterworth East; Lutterworth West; Misterton; Ullesthorpe.

== See also ==
- List of parliamentary constituencies in Leicestershire and Rutland
