= Shelthorpe =

Suburb and ward of Loughborough in Leicestershire, England

Coordinates: 52.751347°N 1.205417°W

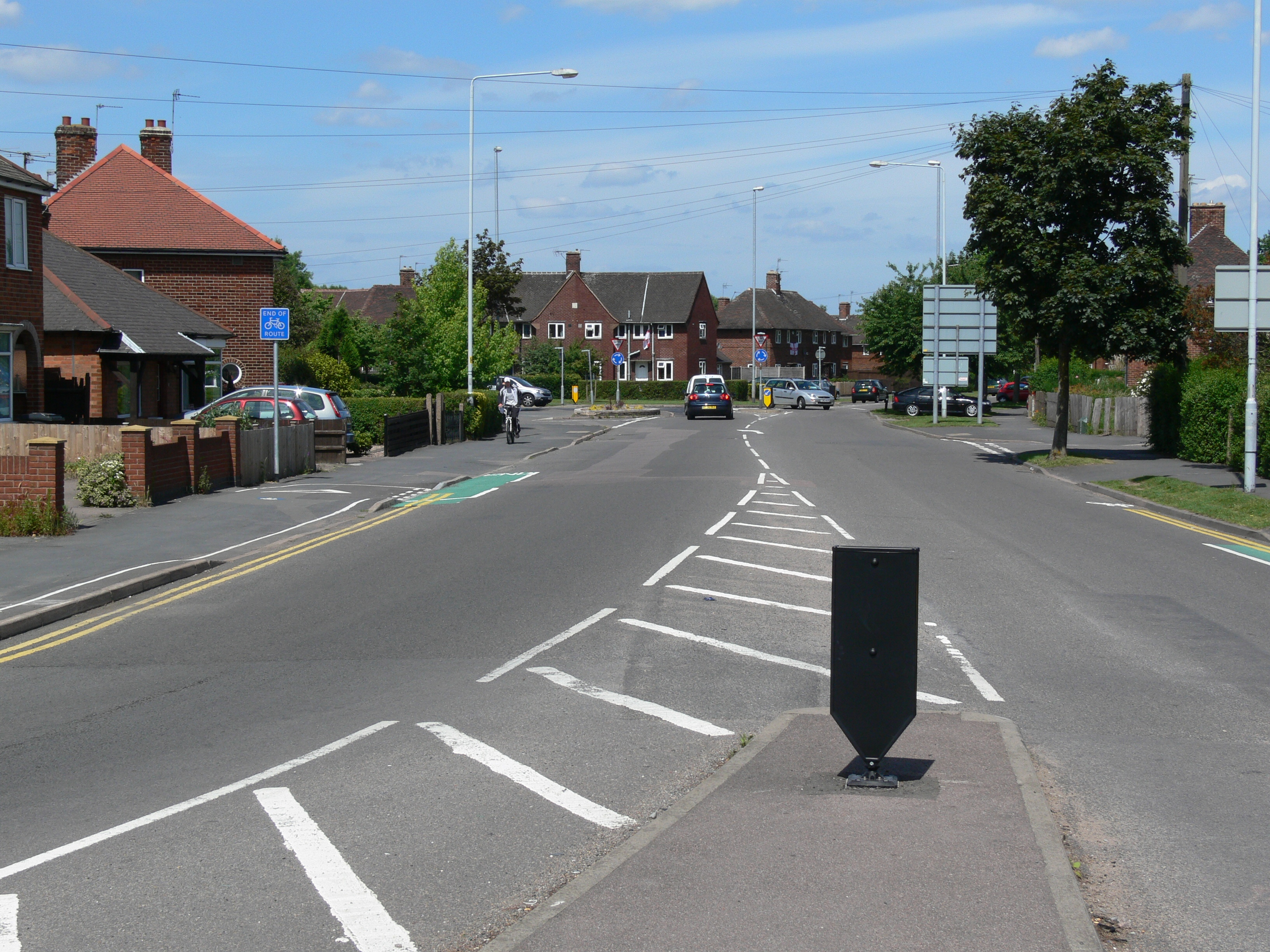
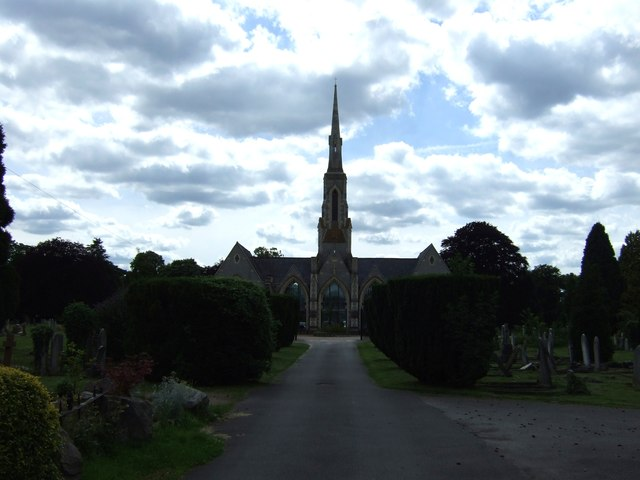
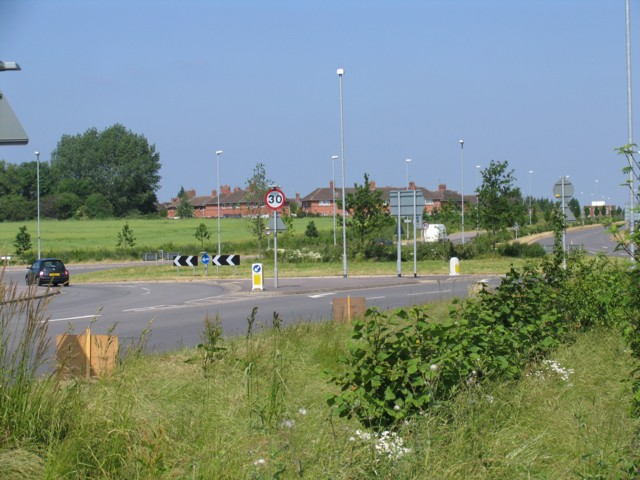
- Clockwise from top: Shelthorpe Road, Skyline of the Shelthorpe Council Estate & Cemetery Chapel

- Location within Leicestershire
- Population: 9,675 (2021 Census Ward Profile)
  - London: 113 mi (182 km) S
- Civil parish: Unparished
- District: Charnwood
- Shire county: Leicestershire
- Region: East Midlands
- Country: England
- Sovereign state: United Kingdom
- Post town: LOUGHBOROUGH
- Postcode district: LE11
- Dialling code: 01509
- Police: Leicestershire
- Fire: Leicestershire
- Ambulance: East Midlands
- UK Parliament: Loughborough

Shelthorpe is a ward and suburb of Loughborough, in the Charnwood district, in the county of Leicestershire, England.

== Geography ==
The ward covers the southern part of Loughborough and is a council housing estate.

== Demographics ==
At the 2021 census, the ward profile population was 9,675. Of the findings, the ethnicity and religious composition of the ward was:

Loughborough Shelthorpe: Ethnicity: 2021 Census
Ethnic group	Population	%
White	8,017	82.9%
Asian or Asian British	1,103	11.4%
Mixed	276	2.9%
Black or Black British	111	1.1%
Other Ethnic Group	101	1%
Arab	65	0.7%
Total	9,675	100%

The religious composition of the ward at the 2021 Census was recorded as:

Loughborough Shelthorpe: Religion: 2021 Census
Religious	Population	%
Irreligious	4,595	50.2%
Christian	3,497	38.2%
Hindu	541	5.9%
Muslim	352	3.8%
Sikh	68	0.7%
Other religion	53	0.6%
Buddhist	37	0.4%
Jewish	3	0.1%
Total	9,675	100%
