= Loughborough Grammar School =

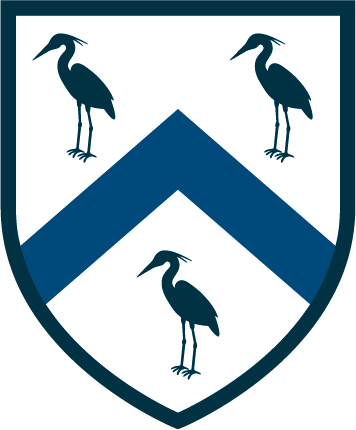
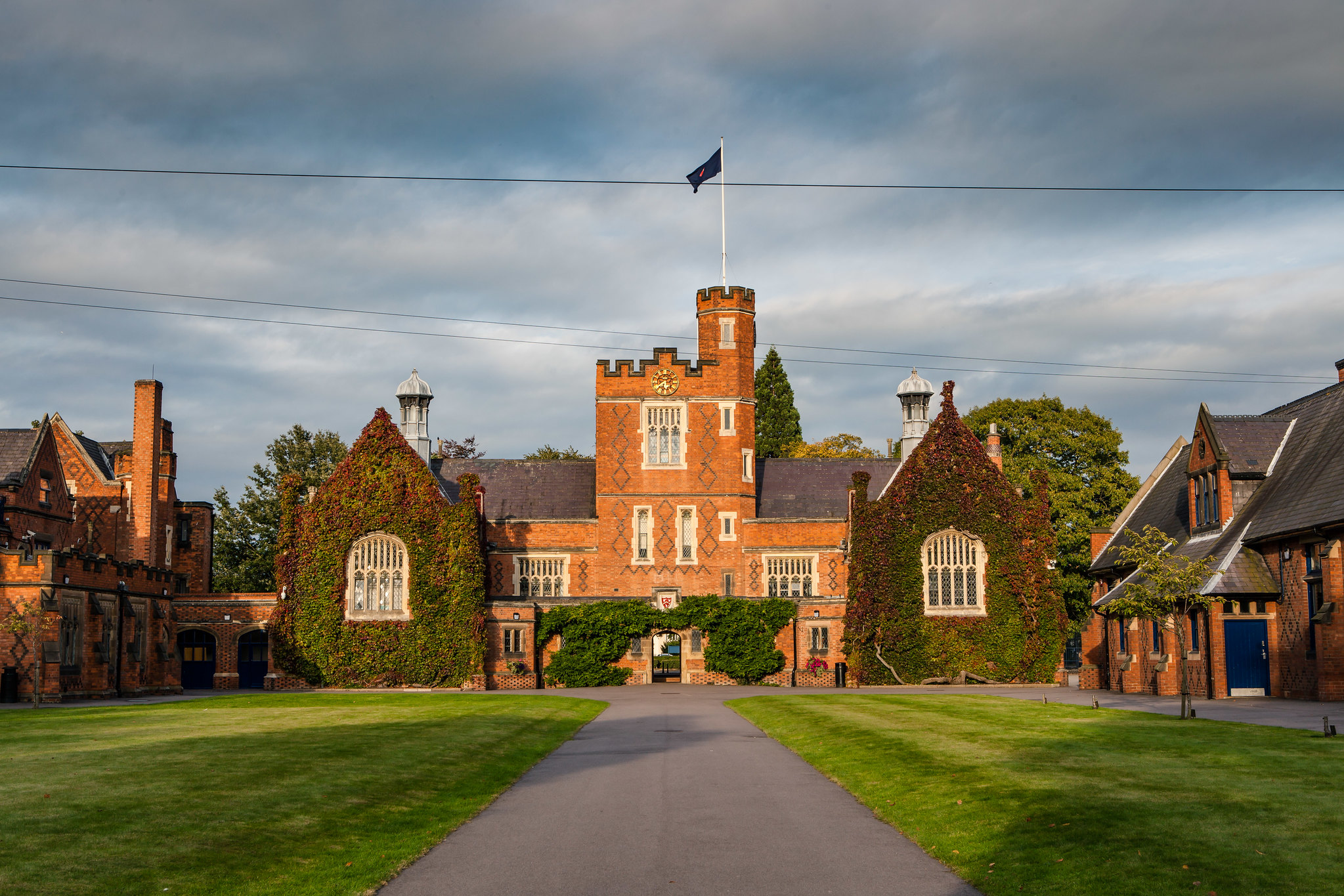
- School crest The main quad at Loughborough Grammar School.

Location
- Burton Walks; Loughborough, Leicestershire, LE11 2DU; England; 52°45′55″N 1°12′02″W

Information
- Type: Public school Private boarding and day school for boys
- Motto: Vires Acquirit Eundo (Latin: "We Gather Strength As We Go")
- Religious affiliation: Christian
- Established: 1495; 531 years ago
- Founder: Thomas Burton
- Department for Education URN: 120332 Tables
- Chair of Governors: Roger Harrison
- Head: James Neville
- Staff: c.130
- Gender: Boys
- Age: 10 to 18
- Enrolment: 783
- Houses: Pulteney; Abney; Yates; Davys; Boarding: Denton; School
- Colour
- Song: Our Father, by whose servant
- Publication: Beyond the Barrier
- Former pupils: Old Loughburians
- Website: www.lborogrammar.org

Loughborough Grammar School is a private boys’ day and boarding school in Loughborough, Leicestershire, in the English public school tradition. It was founded in 1495 with money left in the will of Thomas Burton, and has been a member of the Headmasters' and Headmistresses' Conference since 1962. It occupies approximately 110 acres (45 hectares) of land, including a 39-acre (16-hectare) main campus in central Loughborough and a 70-acre (28-hectare) sports field in nearby Quorn.

It is one of four schools within the Loughborough Schools Foundation, along with Loughborough High School, Fairfield Preparatory School, and Loughborough Nursery.

The Schools Foundation are separate independent schools in their own right but share a board of governors. In line with the charitable intent of its founders, Loughborough Grammar School and Loughborough High School offer a number of means-tested bursaries, called School Assisted Places (SAPs), which cover up to 100% of fees.

The school was inspected by the Independent Schools Inspectorate in 2021, where it achieved a rating of 'excellent' in all categories.

== History ==
Loughborough Grammar School was founded following a bequest by Thomas Burton, a prosperous wool merchant from the town, who left money for priests to pray for his soul upon his death in 1495; these priests went on to found the school.

Loughborough Grammar is one of England's oldest schools, and it is one of a small number of independent boarding schools, alongside institutions such as Harrow, Radley and Winchester in Britain that remain for boys only. Notable old boys include: Sir Thomas Abney, Lord Mayor of London and a founder of the Bank of England; Charles McCurdy, who played a central role in the reforming Liberal Party of the early 20th century; Rev. George Davys, who educated the young Queen Victoria; and the flying ace Air Vice Marshal Johnnie Johnson, who destroyed more Luftwaffe aircraft than any other British pilot. Former masters of the school include the former government minister Lord Elton and author Colin Dexter.

The school was founded in the Parish Church in the centre of Loughborough in 1495. By 1818 the Foundation encompassed three schools, all located on the same site — the Grammar School, with 20 boys, the Reading School, with 120 boys, and the Writing School, with 80 boys.

By 1844, while still located at the Churchgate site, the Grammar School had declined to just eight pupils under the ageing headmaster Stevenson, who was 72 by then. This crisis prompted the trustees of the Thomas Burton Charity to seek a new location for the school, leading to the move to Burton Walks, as it was the only significant enough piece of land owned by the charity. In 1846 the trustees of the charity applied to use the land to create a public park with a new school at its centre, and two years later 144 of the principal residents of Loughborough applied to the Attorney General for the use to include public walks.

The trustees of the Burton Charity relocated the school to its present site in 1852, after the foundation stone was laid by the Bishop of Peterborough in August 1850. A purpose-built site on Burton Walks became its permanent home, initially consisting of the main school building, lodgings, and a gatehouse at the Leicester Road entrance. These buildings were Grade II Listed in the 1980s.

Construction of the new school went about 10% over budget, and as a result the Lecture Room originally planned was not built.

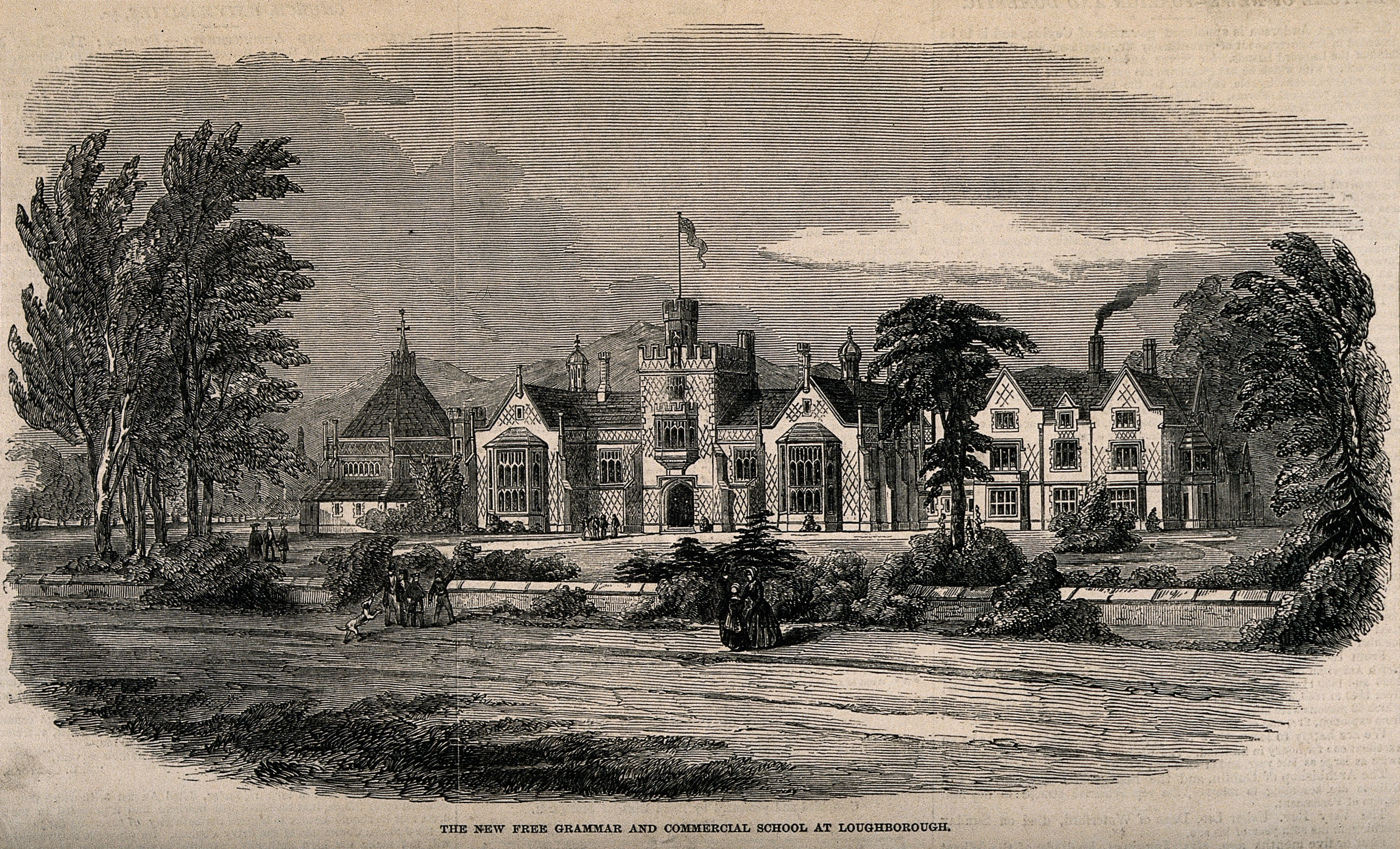
19th century drawing of the School; the Lecture Room on the left was never built.

The school first adopted a four-house system in 1891, with houses named School, Burton, and North & South Day Boys. This changed to a two-house system (Blues and Whites) in 1907, but reverted to four houses — North, South, East, and West — in 1920. In 1961, the houses were renamed Murrey’s, Redden’s, Bowen’s, and Foxon’s, in honour of former headmasters, before finally adopting the current names - Abney, Pulteney, Davys, and Yates — in 1990.

Many former pupils of Loughborough Grammar School served in both world wars. During the First World War, 315 Old Loughburians enlisted, with 291 serving in the Army, 13 in the Royal Navy, and 11 in the Royal Flying Corps. Fifty-eight were killed in action. In the Second World War, 472 Old Loughburians served, with 194 serving in the Royal Air Force, 168 in the Army, and 110 in the Royal Navy. Sixty former pupils, along with one member of staff, lost their lives. Among them was Air Vice Marshal Johnnie Johnson, the RAF fighter ace credited with 34 confirmed victories, the highest total of any RAF pilot during the war.

By the early 20th century around a third of pupils at the School had their fees paid by the Local Education Authority, and in 1939 the school became one of the country’s direct grant grammar schools. Under the Education Act 1944 it continued to reserve a quarter of places for local pupils free of charge. In 1967 the governors agreed a “concordat” with Leicestershire County Council to maintain direct grant status, though this widened the school’s intake and reduced academic selectivity. When the Labour government announced the abolition of the direct grant system in 1975, the governors voted overwhelmingly to leave the state sector (15 to 1).

The School joined the Headmasters' Conference in 1962, following the election of then-Headmaster Norman Walter.

Since its opening, the campus has undergone several expansions. The Barrow Building opened in 1925 following a period of rapid growth in enrolment, with pupil numbers rising from 106 in 1915, to 271 by November 1921. The L Block, originally constructed as a science building, was opened on 30 October 1931 at a cost of £7,500. It provided upgraded laboratory facilities until 1963, when a new science building was completed. The following year, the L Block was converted into the school library. Hodson Hall, constructed in 1961, serves as the school’s principal assembly and events venue and was later extended to increase capacity. Burton Hall was opened in 1991 by Colonel Sir Andrew Martin, and primarily functions as a dining hall for pupils.

The Philip Tomlinson Music School was opened in 2006 and provides state-of-the-art music facilities for both the school and the wider Foundation. The building houses a 130-seat recital hall, two recording studios, over 20 instrumental teaching classrooms, and modern ICT suites. It was opened by Sir Peter Maxwell-Davies, Master of the Queen’s Music.

By 2009, with over 1,000 pupils and increasing demand for science and maths, the school built a modern glass-and-steel quad on the west side of The Walks. The Chemistry Building, named after Norman Walter, opened in 2009, followed by the Murray Building in 2011 and the Physics Building in 2012. The Science and Maths Park, formally opened in 2013 by Professor Robert Allison, Vice-Chancellor of Loughborough University, completed the school’s largest building programme to date.

The school celebrated its quincentenary in 1995, and was visited by Queen Elizabeth II on June 26, 1996. During her visit, the Queen opened the new English block, the "Queen's Building", which includes a state-of-the-art drama studio. The milestone was also marked by the service at St. Paul's Cathedral.

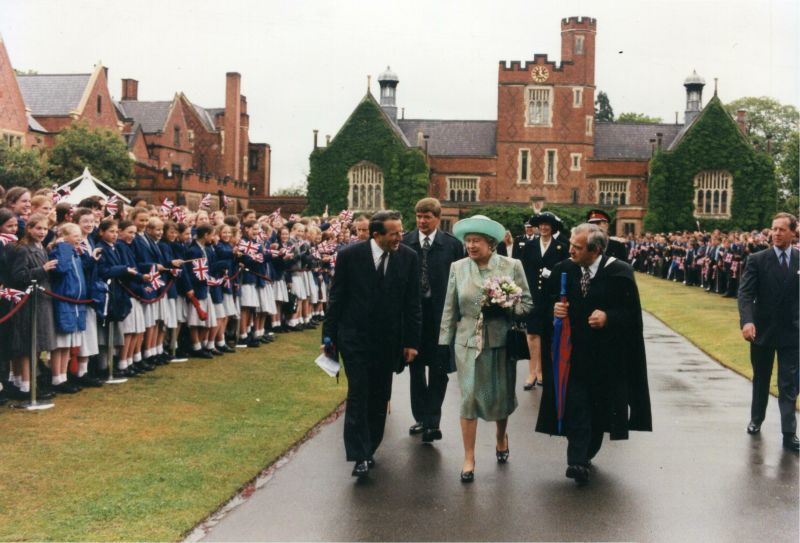
Queen Elizabeth II walking down the quad.

== Overview ==
=== Campus ===
Loughborough Grammar School is set within a multi-acre campus on the south side of the town centre; it is situated on the same site as Loughborough High School and Fairfield Preparatory School, laid out along Burton Walks. The core of the LGS campus is the quadrangle, on the eastern side of Burton Walks. Dating from 1850, Big School, consisting of the Victorian Gothic tower, original gymnasium and hall are at the head of the quadrangle, nowadays accommodating the History department, Chapel and Sixth Form common room, and are the oldest buildings on the current site. The quadrangle is completed by School House (the senior boarding house, which was built as the Headmaster's residence), the Queen's Building (1995, English and Drama), the Barrow Building (c. 1910, Classics and Modern Languages), the Cope Building (2000, Modern Languages) on the north side and the Library and old laboratory buildings (now housing Computing and Religion and Philosophy) on the south side. Big School and School House are both grade II listed, as is the gatehouse. School House was partially destroyed by a fire in 1993.

In 2025, the school’s Sixth Form Centre was named a regional winner in the Best Public or Community Building category at the Local Authority Building Control (LABC) Building Excellence Awards and was shortlisted for the national finals of the same competition.

On the western side of Burton Walks are located the Ireland Building (Physics), the Norman Walter Building (Chemistry), Murray/Millward Building (Biology), Pullinger Building (Mathematics) as well as the Hodson Hall, where most school functions and assemblies are held, the Burton Hall, primarily a dining hall, and the Art and Design department, Sports Hall, The Year 6 classroom, swimming pool and the Combined Cadet Force's buildings. A number of houses on this side of the Walks are now owned by the School, including Buckland House, the administrative hub of the School, containing the Headmaster and Deputy Headmasters' offices as well as the general office. Other houses include Red House, formerly used for music lessons but now largely occupied by the Business Studies, Economics and Politics departments as well as reprographics; Friesland House containing Special Learning Support and Network Services, and one more houses the Bursary. Both the Headmaster of the Grammar School and the Headmistress of the High School traditionally reside in properties on the Walks.

The AstroTurf, tennis, and hockey pitches are not strictly part of the school, but are shared with the High School, although a new hockey pitch purely for the school's use was opened in January 2019. The Music School (2006), is also another of these shared buildings, it includes a recital hall as well as practice rooms, classrooms and recording facilities.

A new £3.5 million sports centre, the Parkin Sports Centre, adjacent to the Music School and shared with the High School, was opened in 2019. It features facilities such as a sports hall, fitness suite, dance studio, and classrooms.

In addition to the main campus, the School owns a 70-acre (28-hectare) site at the nearby village of Quorn, consisting of sports facilities, including those for rugby, football, cricket, and athletics. It was opened in 1994 by Sir David Wallace, Vice-Chancellor of Loughborough University.

The Burton Chapel is located in Loughborough's Parish Church, school services are held in both this chapel and a second chapel located in the School's quadrangle.

There is a public right of way along Burton Walks connecting the area of Shelthorpe with Loughborough town centre.

=== Academics ===
Candidates sit an entrance examination to gain admission to the school, in January of Year 6, so as to enter Year 7 at the age of 11. However, the middle school system that still prevails in North West Leicestershire led the School to introduce a smaller Year 6 intake for pupils leaving their primary schools after Year 5, as happens in a middle school system. There is also a 13+ exam, for those wishing to enter at Year 9, and 16+ entrance based on GCSE performance for boys wishing to enter at Sixth Form level.

In keeping with many other Independent Schools, the choice of subjects at the school tends to be more traditional. The school teaches 28 subjects at A Level. The most popular subjects at A Level are Mathematics, History, Biology, Chemistry, Physics and Geography. Subjects such as Business Studies, Psychology and Physical Education have been introduced at A Level in recent years.

In 2025, 58% of entries at GCSE level were at grades 9-7 (A*-A), with 39% being at 9-8 (A*). In the same year at A-level, 45% of entries were graded at A*-A, with 18% of entries being graded at A*. 30 students had a clear sweep of AAA or higher at A-level.

At GCSE, the maximum class size is 24 pupils, although most classes typically contain between 16 and 20 students. A-level classes are generally smaller, with an average of around 12 students per class. Many subjects at A-level are taught co-educationally with girls from the High School.

=== Extracurricular activities ===
Loughborough Grammar School runs a large Combined Cadet Force (CCF), comprising Royal Navy, Army and RAF sections. About 240 pupils (including a cohort from Loughborough High School and more recently Loughborough Amherst School ) are members of the CCF. Major events include the annual Remembrance Parade in Loughborough in November, and the Annual Review in May. In 2003, Lt Col George Beazley was awarded the MBE in recognition of his work with the CCF. The CCF used to occupy a number of old Nissen-style huts, but these have been replaced with a purpose-built Cadet Force building, part sponsored by the MOD. This was opened in 2005. The Royal Naval section of the CCF is affiliated to the Type 45 Daring Class destroyer HMS Diamond, whilst the Army section is affiliated to the Royal Anglian Regiment and the RAF Section to RAF Cosford.

The school runs an active Duke of Edinburgh's Award scheme, a Scout Troop and biennial adventurous expeditions, which have visited areas such as the High Atlas Mountains of Morocco, the Himalayas and Greenland. A number of clubs and societies run regularly, including the Senior Debating Society and a school newspaper made by students, entitled VOX. The school engages in regular charity fund-raising events, including non-uniform days and concerts. An example of this is in February 2018, a raffle event at a concert raised money for the Symphonic Wind Band tour to Ireland in the next summer.

=== Sport ===
The major sports at the School are rugby, hockey, cricket, tennis, athletics, football, and cross country. The School competes in national competitions in these sports, and has a full structure of teams from U12 to U18 level. The senior cross-country team was victorious in February 2017 in the 46th annual relay race at King Henry VIII School, Coventry. The senior rugby, cricket and hockey teams have all toured abroad in recent years, including separate hockey and cricket tours to South Africa, as well as a recent rugby tour to Australia and The Far East. Other sports include swimming, basketball, badminton, fencing, football, golf, sailing, shooting, table tennis, karting, and bridge. Loughborough Dynamo F.C. was formed in 1955 by a group of pupils who no longer wished to play rugby.

== Notable head teachers ==
- 1894–1900 Cecil William Kaye
- 1955–1959 Walter Lucian Garstang
- 1998–2015 Paul Fisher

== Old Loughburians ==
Old boys of Loughborough Grammar School are called "Old Loughburians". They form an old boys' association, namely the Old Loughburians Association (commonly OLA).

The school has published an annual alumni magazine since 1975. Originally titled The Old Loughburian, it was renamed Beyond the Barrier in 2016.

Notable Old Loughburians include:

- Sir Thomas Abney (1640–1721), merchant, Lord Mayor of London and Member of Parliament
- Richard Pulteney (1730–1801), botanist
- Thomas Green (1738–1788), geologist, Woodwardian Professor of Geology
- Reverend George Davys (1780–1864) educator of Queen Victoria, later Dean of Chester and Bishop of Peterborough
- Joseph Shaw (1786–1859), Academic and Master of Christ's College, Cambridge
- William Yates (1792–1845), Baptist missionary and orientalist
- Thomas Hassall (1840–1920), Australian politician
- Richard Bowdler Sharpe (1847–1909), zoologist
- Sir John Winfield Bonser (1847–1914), barrister and Privy Councillor
- Sir Walter Howell (1854–1913), marine secretary to the Board of Trade
- Edward Anthony Wharton Gill (1859–1944), author
- Julius Hare (1859–1932), artist
- Charles McCurdy MP (1870–1941), Liberal MP and government minister
- W. Sampson Handley (1872–1962), oncological surgeon
- G.W. Briggs (1875–1959), hymn author, author of school hymn
- Sir George Bailey (1879–1965), electrical engineer and industrialist
- Harry Linacre (1880–1957), footballer; Nottingham Forest and England goalkeeper
- Sir William Coates (1882–1963), civil servant and businessman, director of ICI
- Sir Sidney Wadsworth (1888–1976), judge in the Indian Civil Service
- John Moss (1890–1976), lawyer
- Brigadier Frederick Clarke (1892–1972), British Army officer
- Tom Hare (1895–1959), veterinary pathologist
- Clifford Dyment (1914–1971), poet
- John Saxton (1914–1980), physicist
- Air Vice Marshal Johnnie Johnson (1915–2001) senior RAF officer and top-scoring British Second World War flying ace
- A.D. Walsh (1916–1977), chemist
- Thomas William Walker (1916–2010), soil scientist
- George W. Cooke (1916–1992), chemist and deputy director of Rothamsted Research Station
- Peter Carter (1921–2004), law professor
- Sir Denys Wilkinson (born 1922), nuclear physicist
- William Barry Pennington (1923–1968), mathematician
- John Stamper (1926–2003), aeronautical engineer
- Patrick McGoohan (1928–2009), actor and film and television director
- Colonel Derek Wilford (1933–2023), British Army officer who commanded the 1st Battalion, Parachute Regiment from 1971 to 1973 during The Troubles in Northern Ireland.
- Peter Preston (1938–2018), journalist, former editor of The Guardian
- Richie Barker (1939–2020), footballer and manager
- Richard Hudson (born 1939), linguist
- Sir Tim Brighouse (born 1940), educationalist
- David Page (1944–2024), journalist
- Hubert Lacey (born 1944), psychiatrist
- Tudor Parfitt (born 1944), Distinguished Professor at Florida. International University, Emeritus Professor at the School of Oriental and African Studies, University of London
- Julian Besag (1945–2010), statistician
- Robin Parfitt (1946–2006), educationalist and headmaster of Danes Hill School
- Roger Pratt (born 1947–2024), cinematographer
- Stephen Mitchell (born 1949), journalist, Head of Radio News at the BBC
- David Elliott (born 1949), museum curator
- Lieutenant General Andrew Figgures (born 1950), British Army officer
- Bruce Woolley (born 1953) performer/songwriter
- David Collier (born 1955), sports administrator
- Martin Goodman (born 1956), writer, publisher and Emeritus Professor University of Hull
- John Shaw (1957–2013), radio broadcaster
- Admiral Sir Trevor Soar (born 1957), senior Royal Navy officer
- Marcus Rose, (born 1957) rugby player, former England full-back
- Richard Merriman (born 1958), cricketer, Leicestershire CCC
- Chris Wreghitt (born 1958), professional cyclist
- John Dickie (born 1963), Italianist author, historian and academic
- Patrick MacLarnon (born 1963), cricketer and educator
- David Taylor (born 1963) author and professor of psychopharmacology
- Ben Wilkinson (born 1966) Justice of the Peace and dandy
- Mike Nelson (born 1967), contemporary artist
- Martyn Gidley (born 1968), cricketer
- Richard Davies (born 1968), geologist, academic, and the Vice-Chancellor of the University of Plymouth
- Felix Buxton (born 1971), one half of the dance duo Basement Jaxx
- Wayne Dessaur (born 1971), cricketer, Nottinghamshire CCC
- Christopher Hawkes (born 1972), cricketer
- Nigel Mills (born 1974) Conservative MP for Amber Valley (2010–2024)
- Squadron Leader Ben Murphy (RAF officer)(born 1975) RAF officer, Red Arrow and Red Bull Air Race Master Class
- Ben Hammersley (born 1976), journalist
- Stig Abell (born 1980), Editor of the Times Literary Supplement, presenter on Times Radio
- Mark Collett (born 1980), prominent neo-Nazi, former chairman of the Young BNP and subject of Channel 4 documentary Young, Nazi and Proud
- Charlie Bewley (born 1981), actor
- Harry Gurney (born 1986), cricketer
- Will Hurrell (born 1990), rugby player, Leicester Tigers/Coventry RFC and England U20 wing three-quarter
- John Brooks (born 1990), professional English football referee, who currently officiates in The Football League and Premier League
- Matthew Everard (born 1990), rugby player, Nottingham R.F.C.
- Aiden Morris (born 1993), cricketer
- Eben Kurtz (born 1995), cricketer
- George Martin (born 2001), rugby player Leicester Tigers and England

== Masters ==
Notable masters at the school include:

- William Williams (1925–2007), former Welsh rugby league international, taught mathematics and sport at the school 1950 to 1962.
- Colin Dexter (1930–2017), the novelist was a sixth form classics master at the school (1957–59).
- The Hon. Rodney Elton (born 1930), later 2nd Baron, was a master at the school between 1964 and 1967 and on an ad hoc basis at later times.
- Trevor Tunnicliffe (OL; born 1950), former first class cricketer, was director of cricket 1995–2013.
- Martyn Gidley (OL; born 1968), former first class cricketer, is currently (2024) a sports teacher at the school.
- Douglas Robb (born 1970), later headmaster of Oswestry and Gresham's
- Emyr Wyn Lewis (born 1982), former Welsh rugby union footballer, is currently head of performance sport at the school.
- Jamie Webb (born 1994), former athlete, is currently a Chemistry teacher.

== See also ==
- List of the oldest schools in the United Kingdom
