= Christopher Hawkes (disambiguation) =

Christopher Hawkes was an English archaeologist specialising in European prehistory.

Christopher Hawkes may also refer to:

- Christopher Hawkes (cricketer) (born 1972), English cricketer
- Chris Hawkes (born 1982), American songwriter

== See also ==
- Chris Hawk (1951–2009), American surfer and board shaper
