= Emyr =

Emyr is a Welsh given name.

Notable people with the name include:

- Emyr Humphreys (born 1919), leading Welsh novelist, poet and author
- Emyr Huws (born 1993), Welsh former footballer
- Emyr Jones Parry, GCMG, FInstP (born 1947), retired British diplomat
- Emyr Lewis (born 1968), former Wales international rugby union player
- Emyr Wyn Lewis (born 1982), Welsh rugby union footballer
- Emyr Llewelyn, Welsh political activist
- Gwil Owen (born 1960), American singer-songwriter
