= Loughborough High School =

Coordinates: 52°45′56″N 1°12′16″W

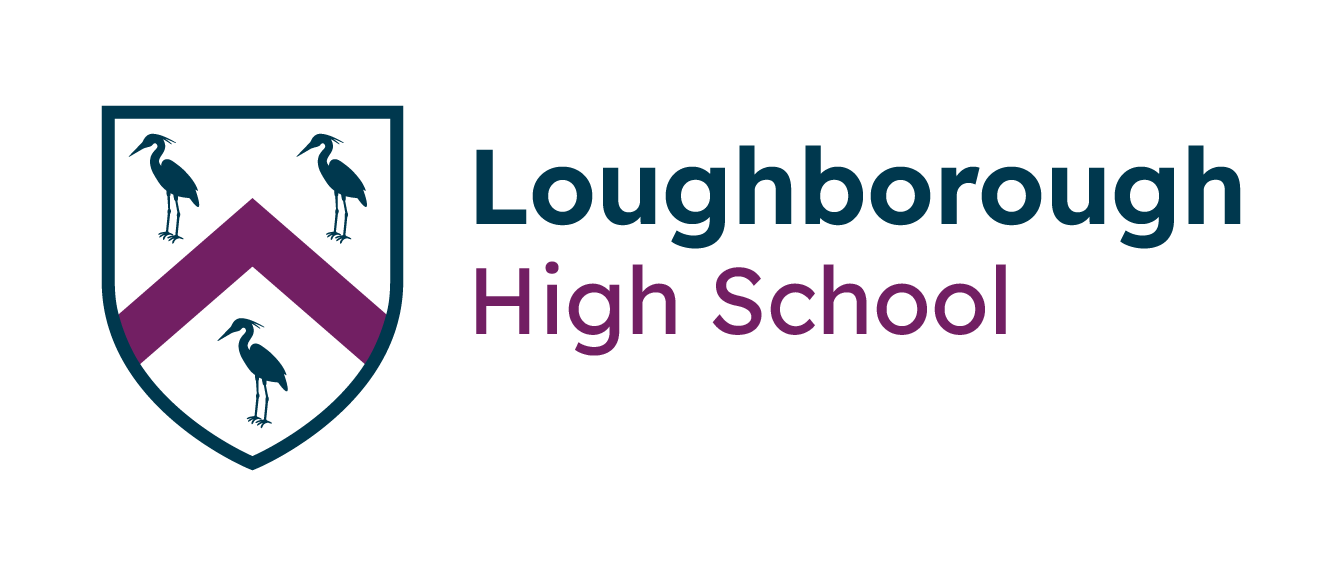
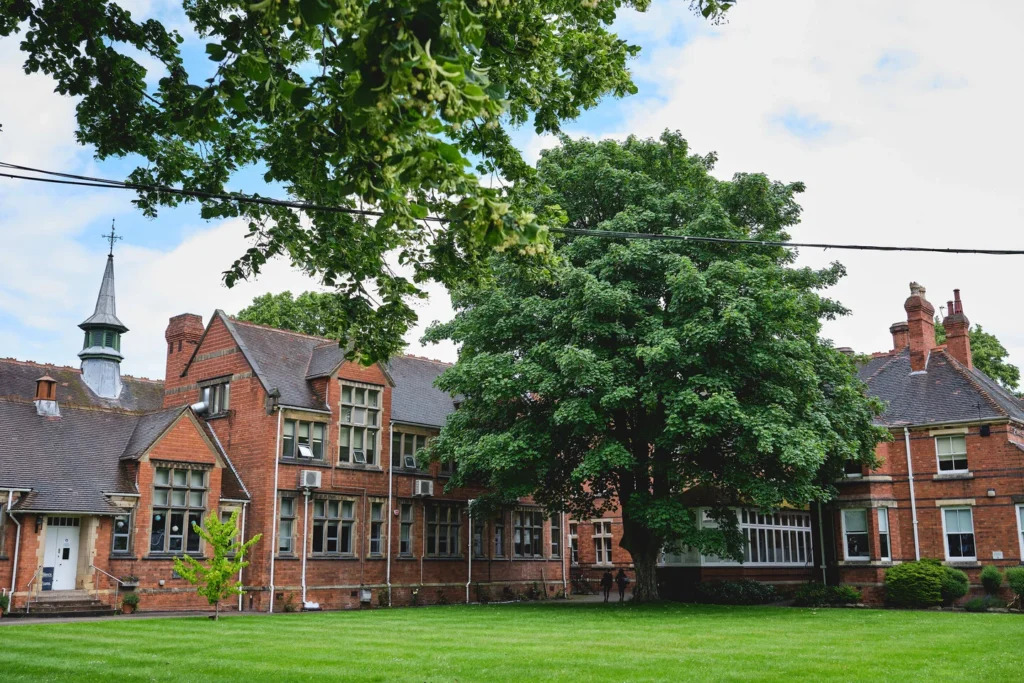
- School Logo The Main Building

Location
- Burton Walks; Loughborough, Leicestershire, LE11 2DU; England

Information
- Type: Private
- Motto: Fais Ce Que Dois Advienne Que Pourra (French: Do What You Must, Come What May)
- Religious affiliation: Christian
- Established: 1850; 176 years ago
- Founder: Thomas Burton
- Department for Education URN: 120333 Tables
- Chairman of Governors: Roger Harrison
- Headmistress: F Miles
- Staff: c.50 full-time
- Gender: Girls
- Age: 11 to 18
- Enrolment: 523 students
- Houses: Burton, Fearon, Hastings and Storer
- Colours: Purple and White
- Website: www.lborohigh.org

Loughborough High School is an independent school for girls in Loughborough, Leicestershire, England. It is one of five independent schools known collectively as the Loughborough Schools Foundation (LSF): Loughborough Grammar School for boys, Fairfield Preparatory School and Loughborough Amherst School and Loughborough Nursery.

== History ==
=== Founding ===
The Loughborough Schools Foundation (formerly Loughborough Endowed Schools) was founded after Thomas Burton, a prosperous wool merchant from Loughborough, willed money for priests to pray for his soul upon his death in 1495; these priests went on to found the boys' school that would become Loughborough Grammar School (LGS). It was not until 1850, when the boys' school moved to a new site to the south of Loughborough town centre and it became more socially acceptable to educate women, that the foundation was extended to girls and Loughborough High School (LHS) was founded.

The school celebrated its 150th anniversary in 2000, when it was visited by The Princess Royal.

== Campus ==
LHS is on a campus on the south side of Loughborough town centre; the three schools are next to one another along Burton Walks.

== Pupils ==
LHS is an all-girls school, educating those from the ages of 11 to 18, but there are some joint lessons in the sixth form with the all-boys Loughborough Grammar and the co-educational Loughborough Amherst, both part of the Foundation. In the past it was (like the present Grammar School) a boarding school, however in recent years all-female boarding has gradually ceased.

== Academics ==
Candidates sit an entrance examination to gain admission to the school, usually at the age of 10, so as to enter year 7 at the age of 11. There is also a 13+ exam, for those wishing to enter at Year 9, and a 16+ exam for girls wishing to enter at Sixth Form level (Year 12.)

Girls are entered for GCSE examinations in Year 11, AS-levels in Year 12 and A Levels in Year 13. Girls usually take 9/10 subjects for GCSE, 1 for AS-level and 3 for A-level.

== House system ==
The House system was created by headmistress Miss Bristol in 1925.

Every girl is placed in one of four houses on joining the school. The house system provides internal competition in a number of sporting disciplines as well as extracurricular activities, including music and drama. Each house has a house captain and games captain in addition to the housemistress.

The houses were originally named after notable men within the founding of both the Endowed Schools and the social architecture of Loughborough town centre. In September 2025, during the school's 175th anniversary year and on the 100th anniversary of houses being created, it was announced that the house names would be changed to women's names after a vote by the whole school body. The names were picked at random from suggestions collected from staff and pupils.

Andrews (green), Bristol (yellow), Charnock (purple) are named for former headmistresses, while Hartley (blue) is named for former pupil, historian and academic Dorothy Hartley.

== Notable former pupils and staff ==
- Dorothy Hartley, historian
- Dorothée Pullinger, engineer
- Sheila Rodwell, nutritional epidemiologist
- Victoria Barnsley, businesswoman and publisher
- Charlotte Smith, broadcaster
- Sarah Clackson, coptologist
- Katie Breathwick, radio presenter
- Jessica Lee, Conservative MP for Erewash
- Alice Bowe, garden designer, broadcaster and writer
- Rachel Parris, comedian and musician
- Katie Boulter, British tennis player

Notable former staff include:

- Margaret Wintringham (1879 - 1955), teacher, Liberal politician, first British born woman elected as an MP
