= Edward Gill =

Edward Gill or Ed Gill may refer to:

- Edward Gill (MP), member of the Parliament of the United Kingdom in the 1650s
- Edward Anthony Wharton Gill (1859–1944), English Canadian author and Anglican priest
- Ed Gill (1895–1995), full name Edward James Gill, American professional baseball pitcher
- Ted Gill (1879–1923), full name Edward H. C. Gill, British politician and social activist
- Jimmy Gill (footballer, born 1882) (Edward James Gill 1882-1948), English footballer, see List of Bury F.C. players (1–24 appearances)
- Edward K. Gill (1917–1985), American politician

== See also ==
- Edmund Dwen Gill
