= Julius Hare =

Julius Hare may refer to:

- Julius Hare (artist) (1859–1932), British artist
- Julius Hare (theologian) (1795–1855), English theologian
