= William Handley =

William Handley may refer to:

- William Anderson Handley, U.S. Representative from Alabama
- William Farnworth Handley, British member of parliament
- William Sampson Handley, English surgeon
