= John Stamper =

John Stamper may refer to:

- John Stamper (engineer) (1926–2003), British aeronautical engineer
- John Stamper (American football) (born 1978), American football player
- John Stamper (mayor) (died 1785), Mayor of Philadelphia
