= Dessaur =

Dessaur is a surname. Notable people with the surname include:

- Catharina Irma Dessaur (1931–2002), better known as Andreas Burnier, Dutch writer
- Wayne Dessaur (born 1971), English cricketer
