= Trevor Tunnicliffe =

English cricketer (born 1950)

Personal information
- Full name: Howard Trevor Tunnicliffe
- Born: 4 March 1950 (age 76); Derby, Derbyshire, England
- Batting: Right-handed
- Bowling: Right-arm medium

Domestic team information
- Years: Team
- 1973–1980: Nottinghamshire
- FC debut: 30 June 1973 Notts v West Indians
- Last FC: 21 June 1980 Notts v Yorkshire
- LA debut: 13 June 1973 Notts v Worcestershire
- Last LA: 31 August 1980 Notts v Somerset

Career statistics
Competition	First-class	List A
Matches	65	104
Runs scored	2,116	1,068
Batting average	25.49	18.41
100s/50s	1/12	0/3
Top score	100*	54
Balls bowled	3,230	2,229
Wickets	42	45
Bowling average	38.11	34.44
5 wickets in innings	0	0
10 wickets in match	0	0
Best bowling	4/30	3/17
Catches/stumpings	37/–	33/–
- Source: CricketArchive, 21 April 2023

Howard Trevor Tunnicliffe (born 4 March 1950) is a former cricketer who played for Nottinghamshire between 1971 and 1980. He later attended Loughborough University, and was director of cricket at Loughborough Grammar School from 1995 until his retirement in 2013.
