= Hubert Lacey =

British psychiatrist (born 1944)

John Hubert Lacey MD FRCPsych (born 4 November 1944) is a British psychiatrist who is professor of psychiatry at St George's, University of London. He specialises in eating disorders and he is Director of the St George's Eating Disorders Service.

He was educated at Loughborough Grammar School, the University of St Andrews, the University of London and the University of Dundee.
