= Martyn Gidley =

English cricketer (born 1968)

Personal information
- Full name: Martyn Ian Gidley
- Born: 30 September 1968 (age 58); Leicester, Leicestershire, England
- Batting: Left-handed
- Bowling: Right hand off-break

Domestic team information
- Years: Team
- 1989–1992: Leicestershire
- 1990/91–1993/94: Orange Free State
- 1994/95–2003/04: Griqualand West
- FC debut: 13 September 1989 Leics v Notts
- Last FC: 19 March 2004 Griqualand West v North West
- List A debut: 22 April 1990 Leics v Northants
- Last List A: 15 February 2004 Griqualand West v Eastern Province

Career statistics
Competition	First-class	List A
Matches	104	119
Runs scored	6,266	2,978
Batting average	37.07	28.91
100s/50s	12/31	2/20
Top score	215*	108*
Balls bowled	13,241	4,306
Wickets	129	73
Bowling average	46.79	44.89
5 wickets in innings	3	0
10 wickets in match	0	0
Best bowling	6/45	4/11
Catches/stumpings	53/–	22/–
- Source: CricketArchive, 6 December 2022

Martyn Ian Gidley (born 30 September 1968) is a former English first-class cricketer who played in England and South Africa. Born in Leicester, he was educated at Loughborough Grammar School, where he now is a master.
