= F. A. S. Clarke =

British Army officer

Brigadier Frederick Arthur Stanley Clarke DSO (3 October 1892 – 3 January 1972) was a British Army officer who served in both World Wars.

He was educated at Loughborough Grammar School. He joined the British Army as a 2nd Lt in 1912. During the First World War he served in Gallipoli, Egypt, Palestine and India, achieving the rank of Major and in 1918 being awarded the Distinguished Service Order. He continued his army career during the interbellum. During the Second World War he served in France, West Africa, North Africa and Italy. He retired in 1947.

== Works ==
- The History of the West African Frontier Force (Gale and Polden, Aldershot, 1964), Col A Haywood and Clarke.
