= William Yates (missionary) =

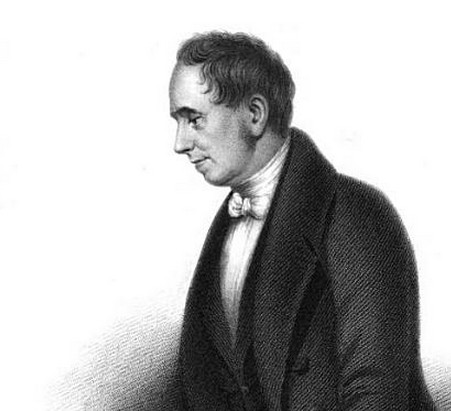
- William Yates
- Born: 15 November 1792; Loughborough
- Died: 3 July 1845 (aged 52); At sea
- Known for: Bengali bible translation

William Yates (15 November 1792 - 3 July 1845) was an English Baptist missionary and orientalist. He created a Bible translation into Bengali.

== Life ==
Yates was born in Loughborough, he was the second son and third child of William Yates, a shoemaker, and his wife Ann, ardent members of the Baptist communion. He was educated at Loughborough Grammar School, where he showed an aptitude for Latin and Greek. In 1812 he went to Bristol Baptist college where he decided to become a missionary.

Yates set sail as a missionary on the Earl Moira on 24 October 1814 and landed at Calcutta on 16 April 1815. There he worked with William Carey on translations of The Bible into Bengali and various other languages. Yates was at Serampore when the missionaries there fell out with the British society and Yates moved to nearby Calcutta as a result of the schism.

Yates became the centre of a controversy that helped to found the Bible Translation Society charity. The British and Foreign Bible Society refused to fund the publication of the new translation. The pivotal case was the translation of the Bible from Greek into Bengali made by Yates and Carey after a decade of study. When Yates made the translation he had chosen to translate the word "Baptise" as "Immerse". This aligned with the Baptist beliefs, but not necessarily with every denomination's values. The new society was formed by the Baptists but the formation of new Bible translation societies proved divisive and expensive and they were eventually de-merged.

On 13 January 1816, he married Catherine Grant, the daughter of a deceased missionary.

In 1827 he returned to England via America but soon returned to India.

Brown University awarded him an honorary degree of Doctor of Divinity on 4 September 1839. Catherine died in 1838. In 1841 Yates married Martha Pearce, the widow of a colleague, William Hopkins Pearce.

He set sail for England in 1845, but died en voyage, three days from Suez.
