= Thomas Burton (merchant) =

English wool merchant (died 1495 or 1496)

- Died: 1495 or 1496
- Occupation: Merchant

Thomas Burton (died 1495 or 1496) was an English wool merchant who worked for the Company of the Staple at Calais. He left money in his will that was used to found the Loughborough Endowed Schools now known as Loughborough Schools Foundation, as Loughborough Grammar School, Loughborough High School, and Fairfield Preparatory School in Leicestershire, England.

The Burton Chapel is located in All Saints Church, Loughborough, where Loughborough Grammar School often holds services.
