= Patrick MacLarnon =

English cricketer and educator

Personal information
- Full name: Patrick Craig MacLarnon
- Born: 24 September 1963 (age 63); Nottingham, Nottinghamshire, England
- Batting: Right-handed
- Bowling: Right-arm medium

Domestic team information
- Years: Team
- 1985–1986: Oxford University

Career statistics
Competition	First-class
Matches	11
Runs scored	177
Batting average	13.61
100s/50s	–/1
Top score	56
Balls bowled	54
Wickets	3
Bowling average	106.00
5 wickets in innings	–
10 wickets in match	–
Best bowling	2/25
Catches/stumpings	3/–
- Source: Cricinfo, 9 June 2020

Patrick Craig MacLarnon (born 24 September 1963) is an English former first-class cricketer and educator.

MacLarnon was born at Nottingham in September 1963. He was educated at Loughborough Grammar School, before going up to St Peter's College, Oxford. While studying at Oxford, he played first-class cricket for Oxford University in 1985 and 1986, making eleven appearances. MacLarnon scored 177 runs in his eleven matches, at an average of 13.61 and a high score of 56. With his right-arm medium pace bowling, he took 3 wickets from 87 overs bowled.

After graduating from Oxford, MacLarnon became a schoolteacher. He is a former headmaster of Milbourne Lodge School.
