= 1902 Birthday Honours =

National awards given by King Edward VII

The 1902 Birthday Honours were announced on 10 November 1902, to celebrate the birthday of Edward VII the previous day. The list included appointments to various orders and honours of the United Kingdom and the British Empire.

The list was published in The Times 10 November 1902, and the various honours were gazetted in The London Gazette on 9 November 1902 and on 28 November 1902.

The list also included the first appointments to the Imperial Service Order, which the King had announced as a new order in the Coronation Honours list earlier the same year.

The recipients of honours are displayed here as they were styled before their new honour, and arranged by honour and where appropriate by rank (Knight Grand Cross, Knight Commander, etc.) and then division (Military, Civil).

== Privy Council ==
- The Lord Revelstoke
- Sir Joseph Cockfield Dimsdale, Baronet, KCVO, MP
- George Henry Finch, Esq., MP
- Henry Hobhouse, Esq., MP
- The Honourable Sir Richard John Cartwright, GCMG, Minister of Trade and Commerce of Canada

== Privy Council of Ireland ==
- Frederick Stringer Wrench, Esq.
- Sir Henry Augustus Robinson, KCB

== Baronet ==
- Matthew Arthur, Esq.
- Frederick George Banbury, Esq., MP
- Alexander Hargreaves Brown, Esq., MP
- Samuel Chisholm, Esq., late Lord Provost of Glasgow
- Colonel William Thomas Makins, a former MP
- John Gardiner Nutting, Esq.
- Augustus Prevost, Esq., Governor of the Bank of England
- Charles Bine Renshaw, Esq., MP

== Knight Bachelor ==
- Edward Fleet Alford, Esq.
- Robert Rowand Anderson, Esq., LL.D., FRSE
- John Elijah Blunt, Esq., CB
- Robert Hudson Borwick, Esq.
- Thomas Henry Brooke-Hitching, Sheriff of the City of London
- John Mowlem Burt, Esq.
- William John Crump, Esq., lately Mayor of Islington
- William Thomas Dupree, Esq.
- Charles John Follett, Esq., CB, Solicitor to the Commissioners of Customs
- Walter Gray, Esq.
- Robert Mitton Hensley, Esq., Chairman of the Metropolitan Asylums Board
- John Hollams, Esq.
- James Hoy, Esq.
- Colonel Edwin Hughes, a former MP
- Edward Letchworth, Esq., FSA
- Colonel John Roper Parkinson
- Colonel Emil Hugo Oscar Robert Ropner, MP
- Henry Seton-Karr, Esq., MP
- John Sherburn, Esq.
- George Wyatt Truscott, Sheriff of the City of London
- Max Leonard Waechter, Esq.
- The Honourable William Arbuckle, President of the Legislative Council of the Colony of Natal
- Lewis Michell, Esq., late General Manager of the Standard Bank of South Africa and Chairman of the Martial Law Board in the Cape Colony
- John Winthrop Hackett, MA, Member of the Legislative Council of the State of Western Australia (included in the official list, but apparently declined the knighthood)
- William Meigh Goodman, Esq., Chief Justice of the Supreme Court of the Colony of Hong Kong
- Henry Alleyne Bovell, Esq., Chief Justice of British Guiana
- The Honourable William Jukes Steward, late Speaker of the House of Representatives of the Colony of New Zealand

== The Most Honourable Order of the Bath ==
Order of the Bath ribbon

=== Knight Grand Cross of the Order of the Bath (GCB) ===
Military Division

- Admiral Sir Robert Henry More-Molyneux, KCB.
- Admiral Sir Charles Frederick Hotham, GCVO, KCB.
- Admiral the Lord Charles Thomas Montagu Douglas-Scott, KCB.

Civil Division (Honorary)

- His Imperial Highness Prince Arisugawa of Japan.

=== Knight Commander of the Order of the Bath (KCB) ===
Military Division (Honorary)

- His Excellency General R. Gorjão, of the Portuguese Army, Governor-General of the Province of Mozambique.

Civil Division

- Sir Charles Howard, CB, late Assistant Commissioner of the Metropolitan Police.
- George Christopher Trout Bartley, Esq., MP.
- Robert William Arbuthnot Holmes, Esq., CB, Treasury Remembrancer in Ireland.

=== Companion of the Order of the Bath (CB) ===
Civil Division

- Inspector-General of Hospitals and Fleets Henry Charles Woods, CVO, MD.
- James Stewart Davy, Esq., General Inspector of the Local Government Board.
- Harry de la Rose Burrard Farnall, Esq., CMG, Foreign Office.
- Arthur Wilson Fox, Esq., Board of Trade, late Secretary of the Royal Commission on Local Taxation.
- Walter Jack Howell, Esq., Assistant Secretary, Board of Trade.
- Lieutenant-General John Wimburn Laurie, MP.
- Gordon William Miller, Esq., Director of Navy Contracts.
- George Martineau, Esq.
- Colonel Charles Wyndham Murray, MP.
- William Henry Power, Esq., FRS, MRCS, Principal Medical Officer to the Local Government Board.
- John Struthers, Esq., Principal Assistant Secretary, Scotch Education Department.
- Arthur Theodore Thring, Esq., Parliamentary Counsel
- John White, Esq., Principal Assistant Secretary of the Elementary Branch of the Board of Education.
- Percy Woods, Esq., late Treasury Officer of Accounts.

== Order of Saint Michael and Saint George ==
Order of St Michael and St George ribbon

=== Knight Grand Cross of the Order of St Michael and St George (GCMG) ===
- Sir James Lyle Mackay, KCIE, late His Majesty's Special Commissioner and Plenipotentiary for Commercial Negotiations with China.

Honorary

- His Excellency Count Matsugata, formerly Prime Minister of Japan.

=== Knight Commander of the Order of St Michael and St George (KCMG) ===
- Henry Austin Lee, Esq., CB, Secretary of Embassy in His Majesty's Diplomatic Service and Commercial Attaché to His Majesty's Embassy at Paris, and to His Majesty's Legations at Brussels and Berne.
- Major-General George Arthur French, CMG, late Commandant of the Military Forces of the State of New South Wales.
- Donald William Stewart, Esq., CMG, Chief Commissioner, Ashanti.

Honorary

- His Highness Ahmad Mu'azzam Shah, Sultan of Pahang.
- Colonel José Joaquim Machado, of the Portuguese Army, late Governor-General of Mozambique.
- Captain Cornelius Álvaro da Costa Ferreira, of the Portuguese Navy, late Governor-General of Mozambique.
- Viscount Meirelles do Canto e Castro, Governor of the Mozambique Company.

=== Companion of the Order of St Michael and St George (CMG) ===
- Claude Coventry Mallet, Esq., His Majesty's Consul at Panama.
- Robert William Mansfield. Esq., His Majesty's Consul at Amoy.
- Edward Marsh Merewether, Esq., Lieutenant Governor of the Island of Malta.
- Walter Edward Davidson, Esq., Colonial Secretary of the Transvaal.
- William Henry Williams Strachan, Esq., Chief Medical Officer of the Colony of Lagos.
- Lieutenant-Colonel Arthur Craigie Fitz Hardinge Vincent, Commandant of Volunteers in the Island of Ceylon.
- Claude Delaval Cobham, Esq., MA, BCL, Commissioner of Larnaca, in the Island of Cyprus.
- Frederic Dudley North, Esq., Clerk of the Executive Council and Under Secretary in the Premier's Department of the State of Western Australia.

For services rendered in connection with Military Operations in South Africa

- Maurice Smethurst Evans, Esq., Member of the Legislative Assembly of the Colony of Natal, and Chairman of the Invasion Losses Enquiry Commission.
- Robert Hugh Henderson, Esq., late Mayor of Kimberley.
- Charles Southey, Esq., of Culmstock, in the Colony of the Cape of Good Hope.
- The Right Honourable Windham Wyndham-Quin, 4th Earl of Dunraven and Mount-Earl, PC, KP

== Royal Victorian Order ==
=== Knight Grand Cross of the Royal Victorian Order (GCVO) ===
- Victor Albert Francis Charles, Viscount Churchill, KCVO, Lord-in-waiting.
- General Frederick Augustus, Baron Chelmsford, GCB, Gold Stick-in-Waiting.
- Horace Brand, Baron Farquhar, KCVO, Master of the Household.
- Colonel Sir Edward Ridley Colborne Bradford, Bt., GCB, KCSI, Commissioner of the Metropolitan Police.
- Colonel Sir Robert Nigel Fitz-Hardinge Kingscote, KCB, Extra Equerry to His Majesty.
- Admiral Sir Henry Frederick Stephenson, KCB, Extra Equerry to His Majesty.
- Major-General Sir Henry Trotter, KCVO, Commanding Home District.

=== Knight Commander of the Royal Victorian Order (KCVO) ===
- The Right Honourable Sir Joseph Cockfield Dimsdale, Bt., MP, Lord Mayor of London.
- Sir John James Trevor Lawrence, Bt.
- Sir Sydney Hedley Waterlow, Bt.
- General Godfrey Clerk, CB, Groom in Waiting to His Majesty.

Honorary

- Baron Hermann von Eckhardtstein, CVO, Councillor and First Secretary of the German Embassy.

=== Commander of the Royal Victorian Order (CVO) ===
- Major-General Hugh Richard, Viscount Downe, CB, CIE.
- Rear-Admiral the Honourable Assheton Gore Curzon-Howe, CB, CMG, Second in Command of the Channel Squadron.
- Major-General Laurence James Oliphant, CB, MVO.
- Lieutenant-Colonel Arthur Balfour Haig, CMG, Extra Equerry to His Majesty.
- Lieutenant-Colonel John Hanbury-Williams, CMG, Private Secretary to the Secretary of State for War.
- Captain David Nairn Welch, MVO, RN.
- Major-General John Cecil Russell, Extra Equerry to His Majesty.
- Colonel Francis Aylmer Graves-Sawle, Coldstream Guards, Commanding the Regiment and Regimental District.

Honorary

- Chevalier Edoardo De Martino, MVO, Marine Painter to His Majesty.

=== Member of the Royal Victorian Order, 4th class (MVO) ===
- Captain the Honourable Alwyn Henry Fulke Greville, Extra Equerry to His Majesty.
- Lieutenant-Colonel the Honourable Charles Harbord, CB, Commanding 1st Battalion Scots Guards.
- Sir George Clement Martin, Organist of St Paul's Cathedral.
- Lieutenant-Colonel Henry Streatfeild, Private Secretary to the Commander-in-Chief.
- Brevet Major Arthur Charles Malleson Waterfield, 11th (Prince of Wales's Own) Bengal Lancers.
- Frederick William Hewitt, Esq., MD, Honorary Anaesthetist to His Majesty.
- Donald James Mackintosh, Esq., MB.
- Lieutenant Gerald Rivers Maltby, RN, Assistant Secretary to the Imperial Institute.

=== Member of the Royal Victorian Order, 5th class (MVO) ===
- Second Lieutenant the Honourable Maurice Vyner Baliol Brett, Coldstream Guards.
- Rowland Bailey, Esq., of His Majesty's Office of Works.

== Royal Red Cross (RRC) ==
- Mrs. Crowlie, in recognition of her services to the sick and wounded seamen and marines who were under treatment in Tianjin Hospital in June and July 1900.

== Imperial Service Order ==
Imperial Service Order ribbon

The King has been pleased to make the following appointments to the Imperial Service Order, which his Majesty recently instituted for Members of the Civil Service of the Empire as a recognition of long and meritorious Service.

Secretary and Registrar and ex-fficio Companion of the Order

- Charles Deffell, Esq., Senior Clerk, Home Office
