= Robin Parfitt =

British headmaster (1946–2006)

- Born: December 22, 1946
- Died: August 17, 2006 (aged 59)
- Education: Loughborough Grammar School, University College, Cardiff, Brasenose College, Oxford
- Occupations: Teacher and Head Master

Robin Parfitt (December 22, 1946 – August 17, 2006) was an educator and headmaster of Danes Hill School.

Born in 1946 in Rhydyfelin, Pontypridd, he was educated at Loughborough Grammar School and studied history and music at University College, Cardiff, before gaining an MA in theology, and then attended Brasenose College, Oxford to work towards a D.Phil. However, he never gained his doctorate, instead going into teaching. His elder brother Tudor Parfitt is Professor of Modern Jewish Studies at the University College London.

He first taught at Carmel College then went on to Colet Court, the prep school to St Paul's School, London.

He was appointed headmaster at Ardenhurst School in Henley-in-Arden, before moving onto the Chigwell School's Prep school and finally in 1989 to Danes Hill School.

Parfitt died of cancer in 2006.

== References/external links ==
- The Times
