= John Saxton (physicist) =

British physicist

John Arthur Saxton CBE FREng FIEE FInstP (28 June 1914 – 17 April 1980) was a British physicist. He was director of the Appleton Laboratory (formerly Radio and Space Research Station), Science Research Council, 1966–1977.

He was educated at Loughborough Grammar School and Imperial College, London, where he was awarded the Imperial College Governors’ Prize for Physics, 1935. He continued at Imperial as a demonstrator 1936–38; before moving onto the National Physical Laboratory, 1938–1952. He worked at the Radio Research Station, 1952–64, and was deputy director from 1960. He was then the director of the United Kingdom Scientific Mission, Washington, D.C., US, and scientific counsellor at the British embassy there, 1964–66. He then was visiting professor of physics at University College, London, from 1968 until his retirement in 1977.
