= Barry Pennington =

British mathematician (1923–1968)

William Barry Pennington (9 July 1923 – 5 March 1968) was a British mathematician best known for his work on Ramanujan's tau function.

Pennington was born in Bawtry, Yorkshire. He was educated at Loughborough Grammar School, and Jesus College, Cambridge. During World War II he served as a Radar Officer in the RNVR, before returning to Cambridge to complete his doctorate under Albert Edward Ingham. After completing his doctorate, he spent two years at Harvard University, returning to a Research Fellowship at Jesus in 1952. He was appointed Reader in mathematics at Westfield College, University of London in 1953. In 1961 he was appointed Professor of Pure Mathematics at University College of Wales, Aberystwyth, in succession to V.C. Morton, and where he remained until his death, aside from the 1959–60 academic year which he spent at McMaster University in Hamilton, Ontario. Tau

== Selected publications ==
- Pennington, W. B. (1951). "On the order of magnitude of Ramanujan's arithmetical function τ(n)". Proc. Cambridge Philos. Soc. 47 (4): 668–678. Bibcode:1951PCPS...47..668P. doi:10.1017/S0305004100027122. S2CID 123032372.
- Pennington, W. B. (1953). "On Mahler's partition problem". Annals of Mathematics. 57 (3): 531–546. doi:10.2307/1969735. JSTOR 1969735.
