= Tom Hare (veterinary pathologist) =

Tom Hare MRCVS (8 October 1895 – 17 March 1959) was a British veterinary pathologist. He was professor of the Royal Veterinary College from 1927 to 1933.

He was educated at Loughborough Grammar School, and the University of Liverpool. During the First World War he served as an officer in the Cheshire Regiment, reaching the rank of captain. After the war, he returned to veterinary studies, and was Thelwall-Thomas Fellow in Pathology in 1924 and Holt Fellow in Pathology in 1925 at Liverpool. He briefly worked for the Lister Institute before moving to the Royal Veterinary College from 1927 to 1933. After 1933 he was Veterinary Research Laboratories from 1934 to 1941.

Hare was also an expert on the life and work of William Harvey.
