= Paul Fisher (cricketer, born 1954) =

English cricketer and teacher (born 1954)

Personal information
- Full name: Paul Bernard Fisher
- Born: 19 December 1954 (age 71); Edmonton, Middlesex, England
- Batting: Right-handed
- Role: Wicket-keeper

Domestic team information
- Years: Team
- 1974–1978: Oxford University
- 1975–1978: Combined Universities
- 1979: Middlesex
- 1980–1981: Worcestershire
- FC debut: 24 April 1974 Oxford Univ. v Leics
- Last FC: 25 July 1981 Worcestershire v Australians
- LA debut: 17 May 1975 Combined Unis v Warks
- Last LA: 31 August 1980 Worcestershire v Kent

Career statistics
Competition	First-class	List A
Matches	57	12
Runs scored	654	38
Batting average	9.21	6.33
100s/50s	0/0	0/0
Top score	42	14*
Catches/stumpings	92/12	9/2
- Source: Cricinfo, 11 January 2026

Paul Bernard Fisher (born 19 December 1954) is an English educationalist, who was headmaster of Loughborough Grammar School between 1998 and 2016. He played first-class cricket for Middlesex, Worcestershire and Oxford University from 1974 to 1981. As a cricketer, he was a specialist wicket-keeper, with a batting average in single figures in both forms of the game.

Fisher was born in Edmonton, Middlesex, and was educated at St Ignatius' College and Christ Church, Oxford, where he read Literae Humaniores.

In August 1973, aged 18, he kept wicket for Middlesex Young Cricketers against Buckinghamshire Young Amateurs at Hoovers Sports Ground, Wembley; the Middlesex side also included a 16-year-old Mike Gatting. Early the following year, Fisher made his first-class debut, for Oxford against Leicestershire at The University Parks, taking a catch to dismiss opposition keeper Roger Tolchard and scoring 14 and 15. He played six further games for Oxford that season, ending 1974 with 13 catches. He also played for Essex Second XI.

In 1975, Fisher continued to play for Oxford, hitting his highest score of 42 against Warwickshire in June. Fisher played in the University Matches of 1975 1976, 1977 and 1978, finishing on the winning side in 1976 (all the other matches were drawn).

Fisher made his List A debut for the Combined Universities) in 1975 away against Warwickshire; he played eight further List A matches for the Combined Unis, who never made it out of the group stages. Fisher made his debut in county cricket in August 1979, playing for Middlesex against Worcestershire at Lord's; he would only play two further matches for Middlesex; a first-class match against Nottinghamshire at Trent Bridge and a List A match against Hampshire at Dean Park

For the 1980 season, he moved to Worcestershire, where he remained the following year as well, but never managed to hold down a regular spot as keeper in the face of strong competition from David Humphries. He made his county debut for Worcestershire on 6 August 1980 against Gloucestershire, taking 5 catches in Glouc's first innings. He made three List A appearances for Worcestershire in 1980. The last game of his career was for Worcestershire against the Australians at Worcester in late August 1981; Fisher bowed out quietly with just one dismissal, that of Australian captain Kim Hughes.

Fisher worked as a teacher at Marlborough College and Prior Park College before becoming headmaster of Mount St Mary's College and from 1998 to 2016 Loughborough Grammar School.
