= Walter Jack Howell =

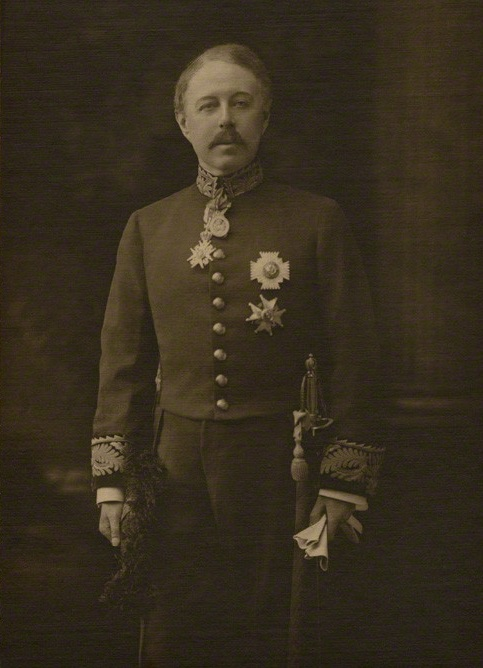
Walter Jack Howell

Sir Walter Jack Howell KCB (16 August 1851 – 29 January 1913) was a British civil servant. He was Assistant Secretary to the Marine Department of the Board of Trade.

Howell was born in Marylebone, the eldest surviving son of Valentine Frederick Howell (1825–1882) and his wife, Hannah Probert (1825–1893), daughter of Isaac Probert of Yockleton, Shrewsbury. Walter Howell was educated at Loughborough Grammar School, King's College London, and in France.

Howell was made a Companion of the Order of the Bath (CB) in the November 1902 Birthday Honours list, and promoted to Knight Commander of the Order of the Bath (KCB) in 1907. He was also a Knight Commander of the Order of St Olaf and a Fellow of the Royal Statistical Society (FSS). His offices were in Number 7 Whitehall Gardens (Pembroke House), with his home at Redlynch, Streatham Common. Howell was a witness at the Titanic inquiry after it sank on its maiden voyage in 1912 with huge loss of life.

A portrait of Howell is held by the National Portrait Gallery, London His obituary was published in The Times.
