= Edoardo De Martino =

Italian painter (1838–1912)

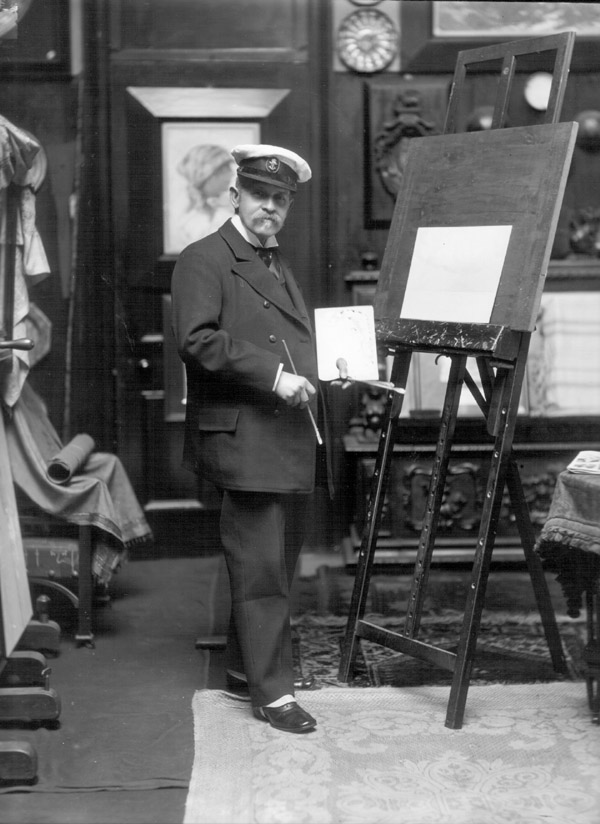
Edward de Martino, 1906

Edoardo Federico De Martino CVO (29 March 1838 – 12 May 1912) was an Italian painter, active in South America and London as a painter of warships and naval battles.

== Biography ==
He was born in Meta di Sorrento. He served as an officer in the Italian Navy, but by age thirty, influenced by members of the School of Resina, he turned to painting, first in Naples. He gained fame in London, where his depictions of famous British naval victories and ships were highly prized, including by Queen Victoria. He painted depictions of the naval battles of Trafalgar, of the Nile, and of Cape San Vincenzo.

From 1905 onward, he also painted many Italian naval ships. He made a number of paintings during his travels, including some of the Brazilian coast.

He was a Marine painter in Ordinary to King Edward VII, often accompanying him on his naval tours, and was appointed an Honorary Commander of the Royal Victorian Order (CVO) in the 1902 Birthday Honours, receiving the decoration from the King at Sandringham House on 9 November 1902.

Edoardo De Martino died in London in 1912.

In August 2013, an exhibition by the Association of commercianti del Casale di Meta (NA) in Naples displayed many of his sketches and works.

== Gallery ==
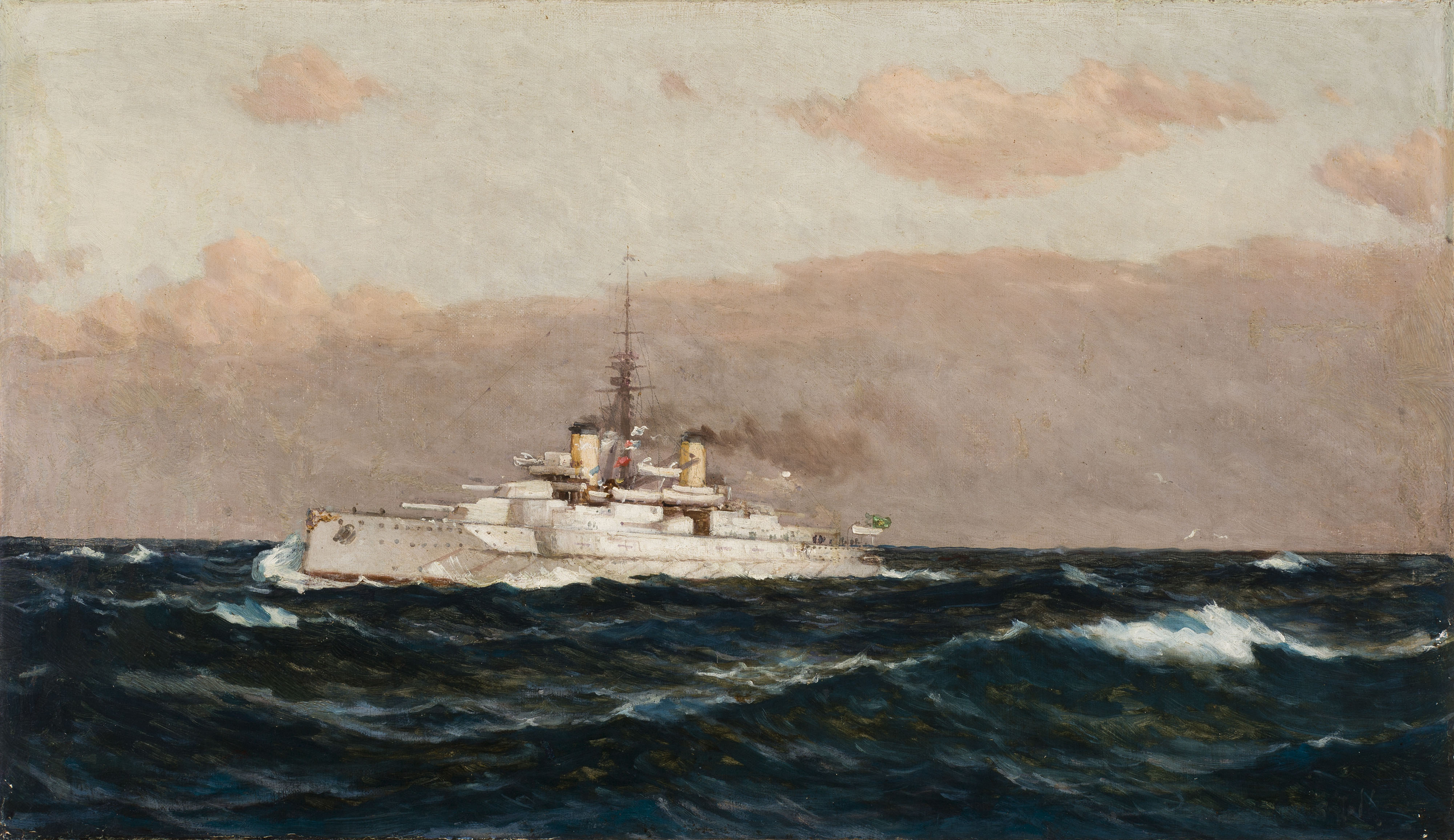
São Paulo battleship

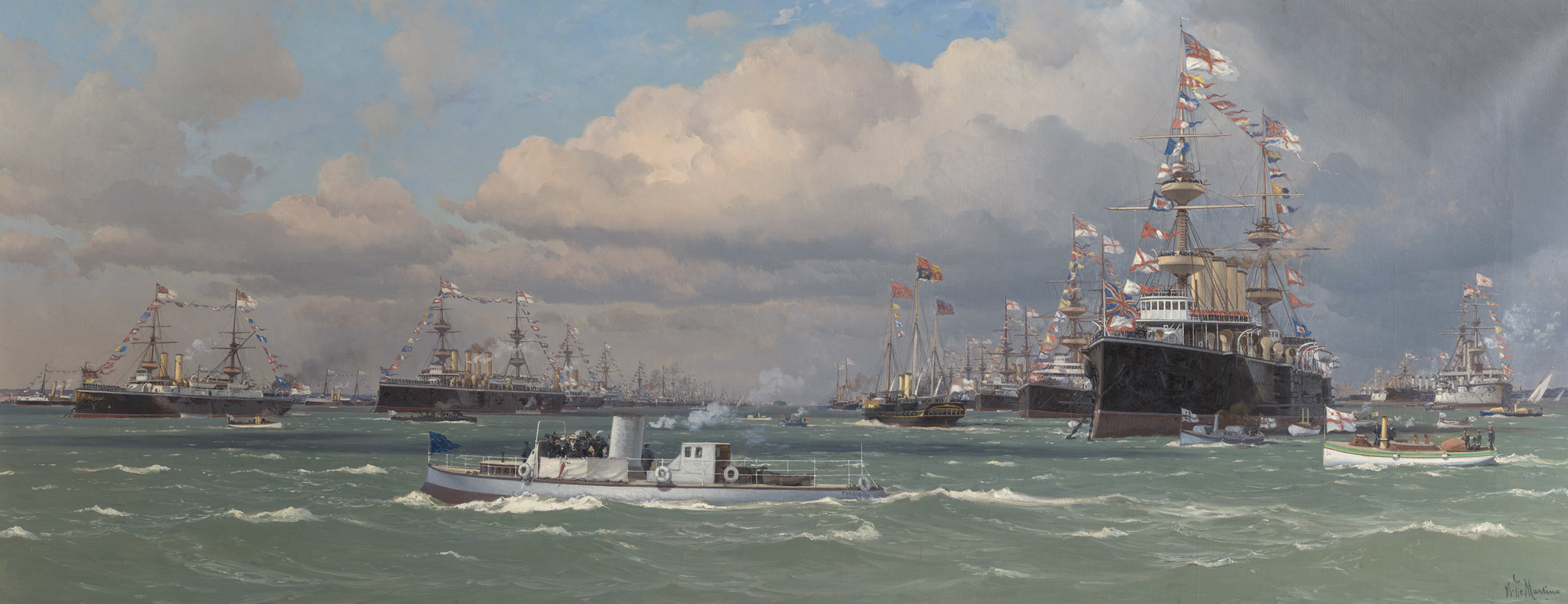
The Naval Review at Spithead, 26 June 1897

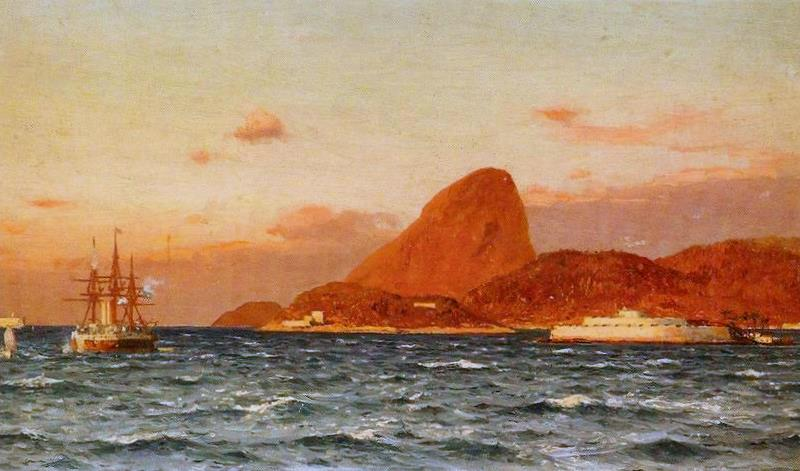
View of Rio de Janeiro

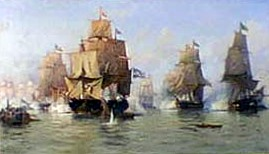
Naval Battle of Quilmes, 30 July 1826

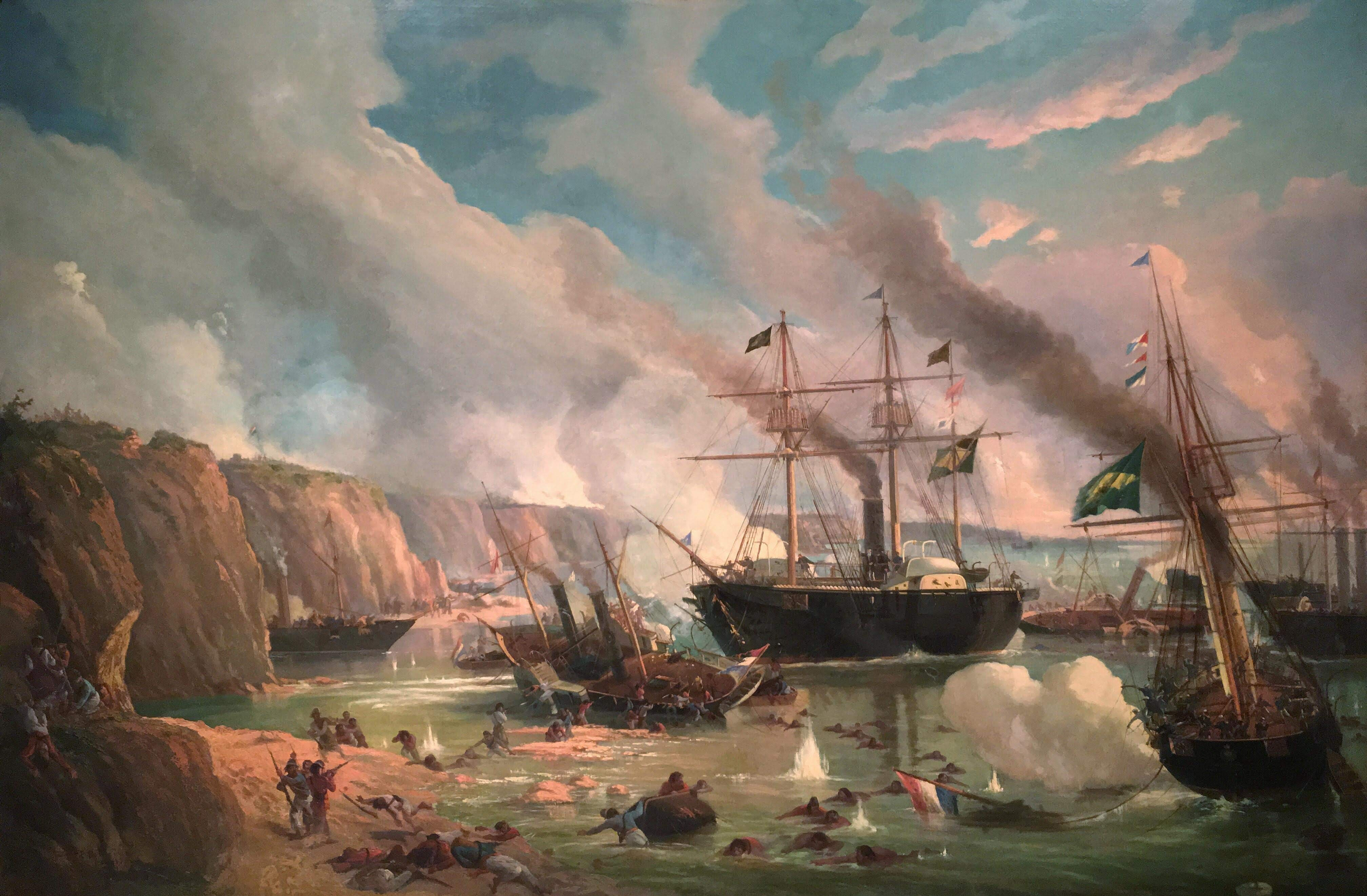
Naval Battle of Riachuelo
