= Sidney Wadsworth =

Sir Sidney Wadsworth (21 December 1888 — 2 March 1976) was a British judge who served in the Indian Civil Service (ICS).

He was educated at Loughborough Grammar School; Sorbonne, Paris; Jesus College, Cambridge and the Middle Temple.

He joined the ICS in 1913. In 1916 he married Olive Florence Clegg (known as Florence), daughter of Sir Robert Clegg and they had one son and two daughters. He was a judge on the High Court at Madras from 1935 to 1947. He was made a knight bachelor in 1946, when his wife was also made an MBE. He retired in 1947 to the Isle of Man.

He published his memoirs entitled Lo! The Poor Indian.
