= David Page (journalist) =

British historian and journalist (1943/1944–2024)

David Page (19 March 1944 – 10 October 2024) was a British journalist, historian, media expert, academic, educator, author and policy researcher. He developed a firm interest in South Asia and he extensively engaged in researching South Asian related demographic aspects and political landscape. He was also responsible for handling majority of the radio broadcasts in South Asian languages. He was a keen observer of the major sequence of events which took place in South Asia. He was also a former editor and manager of the BBC South Asian Services. He spent over 20 years working closely with the BBC World Service as its correspondent.

== Early life and career ==
Page was educated at Loughborough Grammar School, before graduating from Merton College, Oxford in 1966, with a first class degree in Modern History. He spent 1966-67 working as a lecturer at Edwardes College Peshawar in the North West Frontier Province in Peshawar. In Peshawar, he had ample time to write a book titled Page by Page, addressing the key challenges local students had to confront when learning English as a second language. He then pursued a Doctorate of Philosophy at the University of Oxford, as a Harmsworth Senior Scholar at Merton College, Oxford. His D.Phil., awarded in 1975 for research about the partition of India, led to his book titled Prelude to Partition" the Indian Muslims and the Imperial System of Control, 1920-1932, published by Oxford University Press in 1982.

He joined the British Broadcasting Corporation in 1972 as the Coordinating Programme Organiser of the BBC Urdu. He later served as the Editor of the BBC Urdu Service between 1977 and 1985. He also worked as an editor in the BBC's first ever Afghanistan Pashto-language service in 1981 and he also assisted in forming the BBC Pashto Service during its formative years.

In 1994, following a major revamp and overhaul in terms of the operational workflow of the South Asian services, he decided to part ways with BBC. He continued to explore and research Asian related topics and interest even after his departure from the BBC's South Asian services. He was known for his collaboration with Sri Lankan lawyer Kishali Pinto-Jayawardena for the publication of Embattled Media: Democracy, Governance and Reform in Sri Lanka and the book showcased a firm onus on the aspect of improvising freedom of speech and media freedom with an in-depth analysis covering the Sri Lankan context. The Embattled Media book was considered to be a highly influential piece, as it covered the thought process about the series of obstacles Sri Lankan media industry has undergone to establish a Right to Information Act in order to exercise the fundamental rights of free speech.

He also co-authored a book along with his BBC colleague William Crawley titled Satellites over South Asia: Broadcasting, Culture and Public Interest which was published by Sage in 2000. The book Satellites over South Asia: Broadcasting, Culture and Public Interest, was based on a pilot project which came to fruition with the collaboration of many researchers and journalists in South Asia and the book was also taken as a source of information for Indian filmmaker Nupur Basu's 57 minute film Michael Jackson Comes to Manikganj.

His policy research and consultancy solutions for media law impacted the transparency levels of journalism in India, Pakistan, Bangladesh, and Sri Lanka. He also rendered his services for the board of trustees of Afghan Aid. He was a senior fellow of the Institute for Commonwealth Studies. He was a prominent figure during his stint at the Commonwealth Journalists Association.

== Personal life and death ==
Page was often diagnosed with dengue during his frequent visits to Sri Lanka and had reportedly spent a longer spell at hospitals, often requiring blood transfusions. During his stay in Sri Lanka, he was using a wheelchair on an occasion which was deemed precarious before heading to London.

Page died in London on 10 October 2024, after sustaining complications related to his heart. He was 80. Prior to his death, he was also diagnosed with cancer.
