= George Edwin Bailey =

British electrical engineer and industrialist

Bailey in 1955.

Sir George Edwin Bailey CBE MIMechE MIEE (19 October 1879 – 14 October 1965) was a British electrical engineer and industrialist.

He was born in Loughborough, Leicestershire, the tenth child of master tailor Thomas W. Bailey, and educated at Loughborough Grammar School. He became an apprentice at the Loughborough works of the Brush Electrical Engineering Company, continuing his technical education at the University College, Nottingham.

In 1907 he joined British Westinghouse as a draughtsman in the engine department at Trafford Park, Manchester, and was promoted to chief draughtsman in 1909. By 1913 he had been made superintendent of the engine department, becoming responsible for manufacture. When British Westinghouse became the Metropolitan-Vickers Electrical Company in 1919, Bailey was appointed works manager, becoming director and general manager of manufacture in 1927.

In 1929 he joined the board of Metropolitan-Vickers and when Associated Electrical Industries was created in 1931 was appointed the first works director. Within two years he had become managing director.

During the Second World War he served on various committees and was responsible for the urgent manufacture of the first thousand radar transmitters. He was awarded the CBE in 1941 and knighted in 1944. In 1951 he became Chairman of AEI.

He served as President of a number of societies and organisations, including the British Electrical and Allied Manufacturers' Association (1954), the Engineering and Allied Employers' National Federation (1940–43), the Institution of Production Engineers (1939–42), the Manchester District Engineering Employers Association and the Manchester Engineering Council.

He died in 1965 at his home in Berkshire. He had married Margaret Fanny, the daughter of Loughborough farmer Thomas Bolesworth, and had one daughter.
