= Peter Carter (academic lawyer) =

Peter Basil Carter (10 April 1921 – 16 September 2004) was a Fellow and Tutor in Law at Wadham College, Oxford.

Carter was educated at Loughborough Grammar School and Oriel College, Oxford where he obtained a double first. He joined the British Army in 1941, and was awarded Croix de Guerre with silver star by France for actions in Normandy. He was called to the Bar by the Middle Temple in 1947 and was a fellow of Wadham College from 1949 until his retirement in 1988. Carter also taught at the Inns of Court School of Law in London and was a visiting professor of law at institutions in Australia, Canada and the United States. He was made an honorary bencher of the Middle Temple in 1981 and honorary QC in 1990.

== Bibliography ==
- Cases and statutes on evidence, London, Sweet & Maxwell, 1992
