= William Coates (businessman) =

Sir William Henry Coates (31 May 1882 – 7 February 1963) was a British civil servant and businessman who worked principally for Imperial Chemical Industries (ICI).

== Early years ==
Born in Runcorn, Cheshire, he was the son of T. Mallalieu Coates MRCVS and his wife, Esther Tough. He was educated at Loughborough Grammar School, before entering the Civil Service.

== Career ==
He worked in the War Office (1900–1904), the Tax Inspectorate (1904–19), and at the Inland Revenue (1919–1925). In 1925, he succeeded Josiah Stamp as company secretary of Nobel Industries, which was one of the four companies that merged to form ICI in 1926. He was treasurer of ICI from 1927 to 1929, and a director from 1929 until his retirement in 1950. He was made a Knight Bachelor in 1947.

== Death ==
He died in 1963 at Eastbourne.
