= Alice Bowe =

British landscape architect

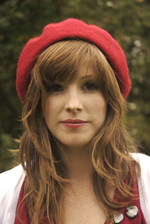
- Bowe in 2009
- Born: September 1980 (age 45); Redhill, Surrey, England
- Education: The Ruskin School of Drawing and Fine Art
- Occupations: Garden designer, broadcaster, and journalist

Alice Bowe (born 1980) is an English garden designer and columnist for The Times.

Bowe was born September 1980 in Redhill, Surrey and grew up in Dorking before moving to the small village of Osgathorpe in Leicestershire at the age of nine.

After schooling at Loughborough High School in the East Midlands, she trained in fine art at Oxford University's Ruskin School of Drawing and Fine Art. She completed graduate studies in garden design and landscape architecture at the Oxford College of Garden Design.

Bowe was the winner of the BT Essence of an Entrepreneur award 2006, and a finalist in the Young Entrepreneur of the Year category at the Startups Awards in 2005.

Bowe features as a presenter on the BBC's RHS Chelsea Flower Show 2009 website.
