= John Moss (barrister) =

British lawyer

John Moss CBE (12 June 1890 - 15 February 1976) worked in British social services.

He was educated at Loughborough Grammar School. He was called to the Bar at Gray's Inn in 1915. He served with 4th Bn The Buffs 1919–1931. He was Public Assistance Officer for Kent, 1930–1948. He was appointed a CBE in 1946.

He was chairman of the National Old People's Welfare Council, 1951–1967.

He was a contributor on topics on legal issues to Halsbury's Laws of England, Macmillan's Local Government Law and Administration and the Encyclopædia Britannica on legal issues.

He lived in Folkestone.
