= George W. Cooke =

British chemist (1916–1992)

George William Cooke CBE FRS
- Born: 6 January 1916; Kingston on Soar
- Died: 10 February 1992 (aged 76); Harpenden
- Education: Loughborough Grammar School; University College Nottingham
- Occupation: Chemist
- Employer: Rothamsted Research Station
- Known for: Improvement of soil productivity
- Spouse: Elizabeth H Hill (Beth)
- Children: Harvey-Jane; William Benjamin

George William Cooke CBE FRS (6 January 1916 – 10 February 1992) was a British chemist. He was the deputy director of Rothamsted Experimental Station from 1962 until 1975, and Chief Scientific Officer of the Agricultural Research Council from 1975 until his retirement in 1981.

== Biography ==
George William Cooke was born in Kingston on Soar, son of William Harry Cooke, a farmer, and Sarah Jane (née Whittaker). After attending Loughborough Grammar School he entered University College Nottingham in 1935 and, two years later, was awarded an external degree of the University of London, with first class honours in chemistry. He stayed on for another year, working with J M Gulland before starting research in the chemistry department at Rothamsted in 1938. After completing his thesis in 1940, Cooke moved from Laboratory life to field trials, examining the use of fertilizers and the profitable management of soils. The details of his many research activities are described in the Royal Society biography. His main focus throughout his career was on obtaining the maximum productivity of various soils with minimum addition of fertilizer.

=== Appointments ===
- Head of chemistry department, Rothamsted, 1956
- Deputy director of Rothamsted Experimental Station, 1962-1975
- Fellow of the Royal Society, 1969
- Member of the Soil Survey Research Board, 1962-1966, 1969-1973
- Agricultural consultant to the Rubber Research Institute of Malaysia, 1962-1978
- Chairman of the Rothamsted Field Plots Committee, 1971-1975
- Foreign member of the Lenin All-Union Academy of Agricultural Sciences of the USSR, 1972
- Consultant in soils to the Empire Cotton Growing Corporation, 1972-1973
- CBE, 1975
- Chief Scientific Officer of the Agricultural Research Council (ARC), 1975-1981
- Member of the Board of Directors of the International Fertilizer Development Centre, Muscle Shoals, 1976-1979
- Honorary member of the Royal Irish Academy, 1980

=== Books ===
- Fertilizers and Profitable Farming. London: Crosby Lockwood & Son, 1960
- The control of soil fertility. London: Crosby Lockwood, 1967
- Fertilizing for Maximum Yield. London: Crosby Lockwood, 1972

=== Family ===
Cooke married Elizabeth H Hill in 1944. She managed the glasshouses at Berkhamsted, and they later published together. The Cookes had two children: Harvey-Jane in 1958 and William Benjamin in 1960.

George William Cooke, who lived in Harpenden, died on 10 February 1992.
