= Edward Anthony Wharton Gill =

Edward Anthony Wharton Gill (1859-1944) was an English Canadian author and Anglican priest.

Gill was born in Scraptoft, England in 1858, and was educated at Loughborough Grammar School and the University of London. He briefly taught at Market Drayton and in the Danish West Indies before emigrating to Canada in 1884. Gill went back to school at the University of Manitoba and was ordained an Anglican priest. He then returned to teaching and became a professor of theology at St. John's College, University of Manitoba. He wrote two novels - Love in Manitoba (1911) and An Irishman's Luck (1914). He also released a semi-autobiographical work entitled A Manitoba Chore Boy in 1912.

On 21 April 1886, Gill married Ellen Agnes Cook, and they had five children.

== Works ==
- Love In Manitoba, (1912)
- A Manitoba Chore Boy, (1912)
- An Irishman's Luck: A Tale Of Manitoba, (1914)
