= Wayne Dessaur =

English cricketer

Personal information
- Full name: Wayne Anthony Dessaur
- Born: 4 February 1971 (age 55); Nottingham, England
- Batting: Right-handed
- Bowling: Right arm medium
- Role: Batsman, occasional support bowler

Domestic team information
- Years: Team
- 1992-1994: Nottinghamshire
- 1995: Derbyshire
- First-class debut: 19 June 1992 Notts v Northants
- Last First-class: 19 July 1995 Derbys v Young Australia
- List A debut: 14 June 1992 Notts v Somerset
- Last List A: 12 July 1995 Derbys v Sussex

Career statistics
Competition	First-class	List A
Matches	22	6
Runs scored	1121	124
Batting average	32.02	31.00
100s/50s	3/4	0/1
Top score	148	85
Balls bowled	144	0
Wickets	1	N/A
Bowling average	118.00	N/A
5 wickets in innings	0	N/A
10 wickets in match	0	N/A
Best bowling	1-8	N/A
Catches/stumpings	6/0	0/0
- Source: ESPNCricinfo

Wayne Anthony Dessaur (born 4 February 1971, in Nottingham) is a former English cricketer. He was a right-handed batsman and an occasional right-arm medium-pace bowler who played for Nottinghamshire and Derbyshire in a five-year first-class cricketing career.

Educated at Loughborough Grammar School, he first represented Nottinghamshire in the Second XI Championship in 1989. He started his career as an upper-middle order batsman, and later moved to the opening position. On his debut for Derbyshire in May 1995 he hit a century against Oxford University. However, his contract was not renewed after the 1995 County Championship.

After finishing at Derbyshire he studied at Nottingham University, gaining a degree in physiotherapy. He emigrated to Australia, where he has his own physiotherapy practice in Adelaide. He is also involved with South Australia Cricket. In 2008 he and Mary E. Magarey published a review article in the Journal of Orthopaedic and Sports Physical Therapy entitled "Diagnostic Accuracy of Clinical Tests for Superior Labral Anterior Posterior Lesions : A Systematic Review".
