= Sampson Handley =

English surgeon

- Born: William Sampson Handley; 12 April 1872; Loughborough, Leicestershire, England
- Died: 18 March 1962 (aged 89); Malvern, Worcestershire, England
- Occupation: Surgeon
- Known for: Cancer Surgery

William Sampson Handley MD, MS, FRCS (12 April 1872 – 1962) was an English surgeon who influenced the development of cancer surgery.

He was born in Loughborough, Leicestershire, England, he was the son of a Chemist Thomas Handley. He was educated at Loughborough Grammar School.

Sampson Handley trained as a medical doctor at Guy's Hospital from 1889 where he qualified in 1895 and became an MD the following year. He took in an interest in pathology as a route to becoming a surgeon and became a Fellow of the Royal College of Surgeons in 1897.

He worked at the cancer research wing at the Middlesex Hospital where he researched the methods by which cancer spread. He found that the main extension of breast cancer was along the lymphatics and he coined the words Lymphatic permeation. In 1905 he became an Assistant Surgeon at the Middlesex Hospital and continued his research into cancer. In 1906 he published Cancer of the Breast and its Operative Treatment which created his reputation with the wider medical establishment. In 1911 he was awarded the Walker Prize by the Royal College of Surgeons for advancing the knowledge of the pathology and therapeutics of cancer. As well as his work with cancer he was also a skilled abdominal surgeon.

During the first world war he served in the Royal Army Medical Corps as a captain. For his work he was elected an Honorary Fellow of the American College of Surgeons, a foreign Member of the Academy of Medicine of Rome. He was vice-president of the Royal College of Surgeons from 1931 to 1934.

== Family life ==
Handley married Muriel Rigby in 1908 and they had four sons and a daughter.

== Books ==
- Handley, W Sampson (1906). Cancer of the Breast and its Operative Treatment. London: John Murray.
- Handley, W Sampson (1931). The Genesis and Prevention of Cancer. London: H. K. Lewis & Co. Ltd.
