= John Stamper (engineer) =

John Trevor Stamper (12 October 1926 – 15 November 2003) was a British aeronautical engineer who was Corporate Technical Director of British Aerospace from 1977 to 1985 and chief designer of the Blackburn Buccaneer strike aircraft.

Born in Kentucky, Leicestershire, he was educated at Loughborough Grammar School where he was head boy in 1943 and Jesus College, Cambridge, where he read aeronautical engineering.
