= Julius Hare (artist) =

British artist (1859–1932)

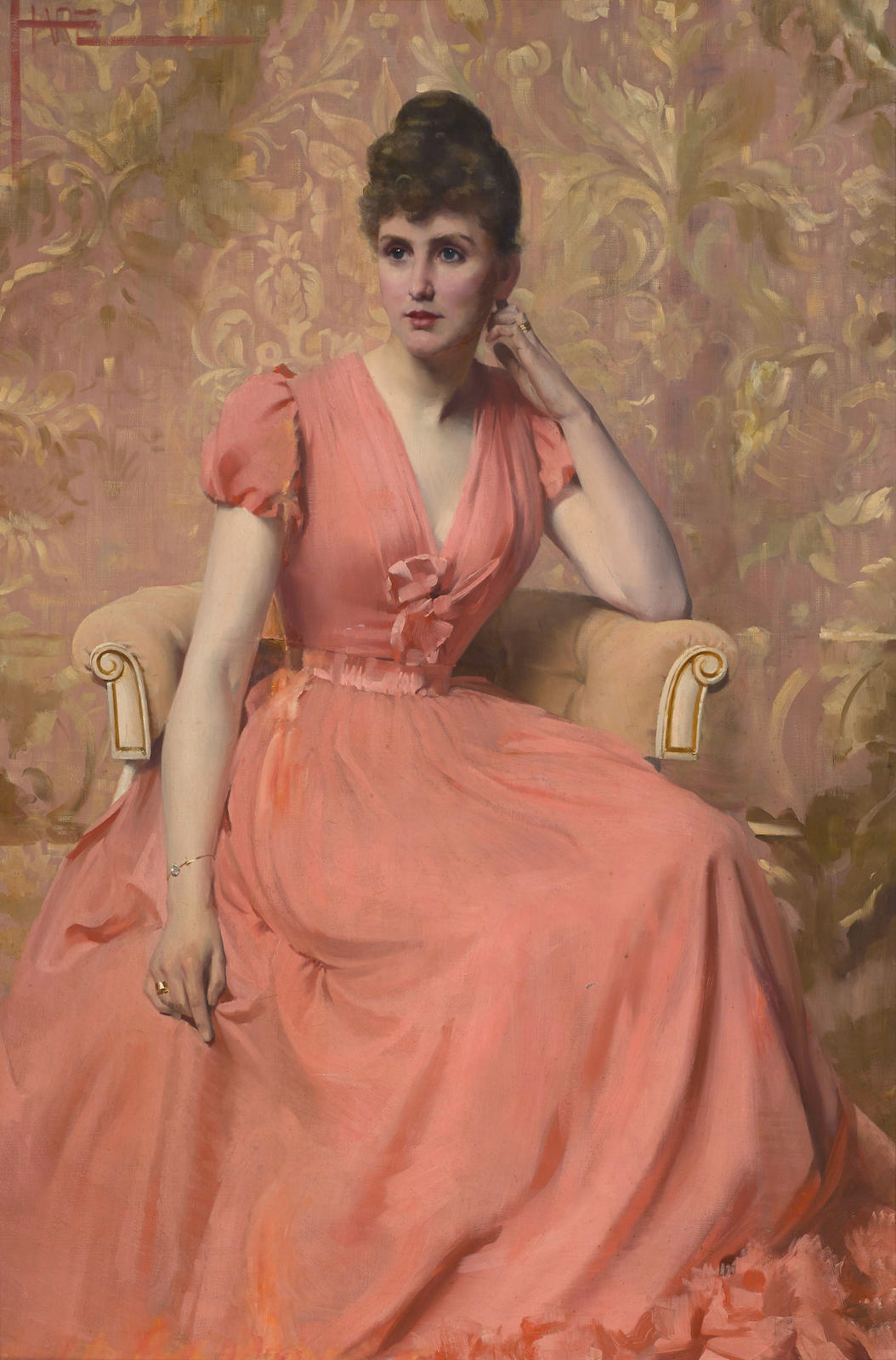
Portrait of a lady (before 1932)

Julius Hare R.C.A. (23 January 1859 – 12 March 1932) was a British artist, painter of portraits and landscapes.

Hare was born in Dublin, the son of Mathias Hare LLD. He was educated at Loughborough Grammar School in England. Later, he studied under Adolphe Yvon of Paris, and also at the West London School of Art, South Kensington, and the Heatherley School of Fine Art. Hare was made an associate of the Royal Academy of Arts in London, and exhibited there. Hare was also elected as a member of the Royal Cambrian Academy in 1890.

Hare lived in the artist's colony in Plas Mawr, Conwy, North Wales, home to the Royal Cambrian Academy.
