= Loughborough Amherst School =

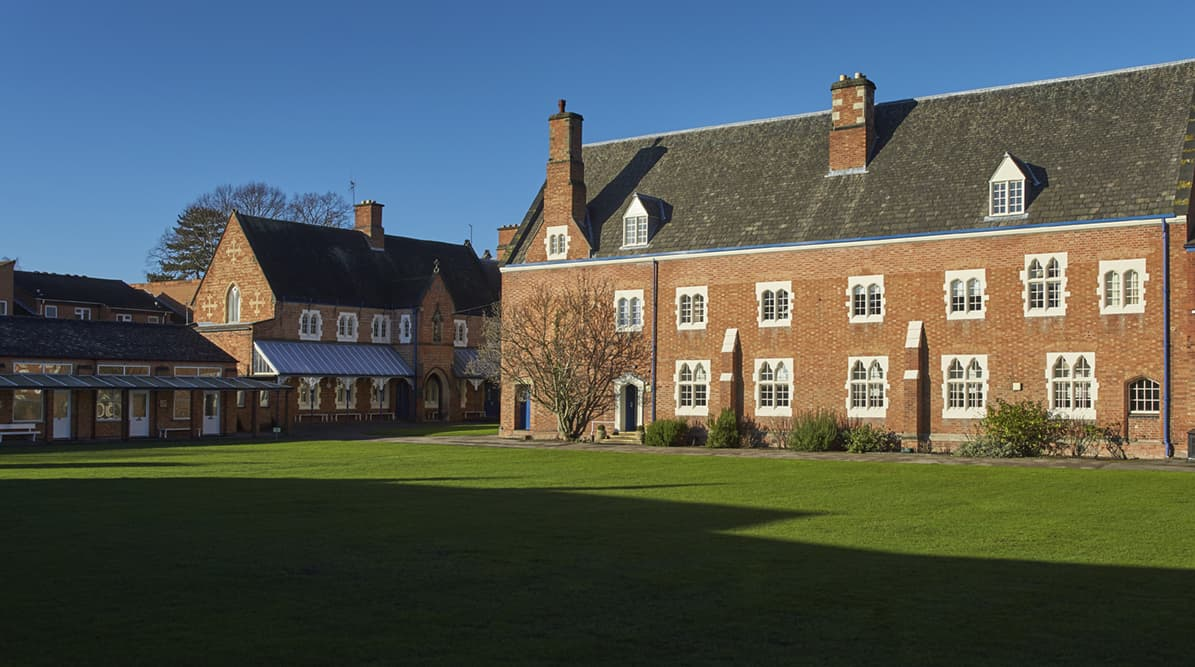

Location
- Gray Street; Loughborough, Leicestershire, LE11 2DZ; England
- 52°45′36″N 1°12′29″W

Information
- Type: Independent
- Religious affiliation: Roman Catholic
- Established: 1850; 176 years ago
- Founder: Antonio Rosmini
- Closed: July 4, 2025
- Department for Education URN: 120317 Tables
- Chairman: Roger Harrison
- Interim Head: Grace Davies
- Gender: Coeducational (from September 2019)
- Age: 4 to 18
- Enrolment: 284
- Houses: Agnes, Peter, Rosmini and Teresa
- Colours: Teal, white and navy
- Website: www.lsf.org/amherst

Loughborough Amherst School, formerly known as Our Lady's Convent School (OLCS), was an independent day and boarding school in Loughborough, England, catering for girls and boys aged 4 to 18. It was founded on traditional Catholic principles and embraced all faiths.

Until August/September 2015, it was run by the Rosminian order. In September 2015, it became subsumed into the Loughborough Endowed Schools, a body which changed its registered name with effect from 19 April 2018 to "Loughborough Schools Foundation". The Rosminian Sisters continued to occupy part of the site. The school buildings were leased by the Rosminians to the Loughborough Schools Foundation.

The main convent building and chapel were designed by renowned Gothic Revival architect, Charles Hansom, and are grade II listed.

A wide variety of GCSE and A Level subjects were offered in the Senior department. As a Catholic school, RS GCSE was compulsory. There was a wide variety of cultural, musical and sporting activities offered as part of the school's co-curricular programme, including Duke of Edinburgh's Award and Combined Cadet Force. As a member of the Loughborough Schools Foundation, Amherst pupils benefited from the Midlands' only 'All Steinway' Music Department and extensive sports facilities at the £3.5 million Parkin Sports Centre completed in 2019.

In April 2018, the school announced a new policy of accepting boys into the secondary school from September 2019. This was announced alongside a new name – Loughborough Amherst School. In the same year, Amherst welcomed its first boarders as part of its elite tennis programme, in partnership with Loughborough University National Tennis Academy (LUNTA).

In January 2025, the board of governors of the Loughborough Schools Foundation announced the potential closure, subject to consultation, of Loughborough Amherst School at the end of the 2024/25 academic year, citing "rising operating costs and the introduction of VAT on school fees." In March 2025, it was confirmed that the school would close permanently at the end of the school year.

The school closed on 4 July 2025.

== Origins and history ==
In 1841, Lady Mary Arundell (c. 1785–1845) (widow of Lord Arundell of Wardour) opened a small school for girls in her home Paget House in Woodgate, Loughborough.

Lady Mary asked the Rosminian Sisters of Providence to assist her in this endeavour and two nuns from Italy were sent to Loughborough. On the Solemnity of the Annunciation ("Lady Day") 25 March 1844, the Rosminian sisters took charge of the work, which was the first Roman Catholic school in England run by religious sisters.

Mary Amherst (Sister Mary Agnes) (1824–1860) joined the Order in 1846 and came to Loughborough. In 1854, she became the first Superior in England of the Order. Loughborough became the central house of the Rosminian Sisters in England.

Mary was engaged to the architect Augustus Pugin. Pugin had proposed to Mary in November 1844, shortly after the death of his second wife. Mary had accepted. However, the engagement did not last, for in May 1846 Mary entered the Order of the Rosminian Sisters of Providence. Mary's brother William became a Jesuit. Her brother Francis became Roman Catholic Bishop of Nottingham (1858 to 1879).

A convent was established at Gray Street, Loughborough, and the school moved to Gray Street. The convent and chapel were designed by architect Charles Hansom, brother of the inventor of the Hansom cab. Charles was an acolyte of Augustus Pugin.

== Alumnae ==
Alumnae include:

- Lydia Rose Bewley (born 1985), actress
- Molly Smitten-Downes (born 1985), singer
- Sophie Hahn (born 1997), para athlete and former World Champion
