= Emyr Wyn Lewis =

Welsh rugby union player (born 1982)

Emyr Lewis
- Born: Emyr Wyn Lewis; 3 October 1982 (age 44) Swansea, Wales
- Height: 1.82 m (6 ft 0 in)
- Weight: 112 kg (247 lb)
- School: Amman Valley Comprehensive
- University: UWE, Hartpury College

Rugby union career
- Position: Loose Head Prop / Tight Head Prop
Amateur team(s)
Years	Team	Apps	(Points)
- Amman United RFC
Senior career
Years	Team	Apps	(Points)
- Neath RFC
–	CR El Salvador		
–	Newport RFC		
–	Pertemps Bees		
–	Gloucester RFC		
- Correct as of 2007-11-28

Emyr Wyn Lewis (born 3 October 1982) is a retired Welsh rugby union footballer.

In 2007-2008 Lewis made his European Challenge Cup debut against Connacht at Pepe Rojo (Spain) and also went on to play against Newcastle at Kingston Park. In 2008-2009 Emyr played in the competition again for El Salvador. Lewis started all six of the games home and away, against Brive, Newcastle and Parma and played through to the final whistle.

Lewis signed on to play for Neath RFC for the 2009–2010 season. He moved from Spanish Giants, El Salvador at the end of the 2008–2009 season, after coming runner-up in the countries Division De Honor league

Lewis has previously played for Newport RFC, Birmingham & Solihull RFC, Stoke RFC (Nelson Bays RFU, NZ), Gloucester RFC, Swansea RFC U-19s, and, where he began his playing career, at Amman United RFC.

He has also represented the Welsh Exiles and the Welsh Crawsheys XV.
