= Christopher Hawkes (cricketer) =

English cricketer

Personal information
- Full name: Christopher James Hawkes
- Born: 14 July 1972 (age 54); Loughborough, Leicestershire, England
- Batting: Left-handed
- Bowling: Slow left-arm orthodox

Domestic team information
- Years: Team
- 1990–1992: Leicestershire

Career statistics
Competition	First-class
Matches	4
Runs scored	65
Batting average	16.25
100s/50s	–/–
Top score	18
Balls bowled	336
Wickets	5
Bowling average	32.40
5 wickets in innings	–
10 wickets in match	–
Best bowling	4/18
Catches/stumpings	2/–
- Source: Cricinfo, 8 February 2013

Christopher James Hawkes (born 14 July 1972) is a former English cricketer. Hawkes is a left-handed batsman who bowls slow left-arm orthodox. He was born at Loughborough, Leicestershire.

Hawkes made his first-class debut for Leicestershire against Derbyshire in the 1990 County Championship at the County Ground, Derby, in what was his only first team appearance in that season. In February 1991 he toured New Zealand, making two Youth Test match appearances for England Under-19s against New Zealand Under-19s, as well as making a single Youth One Day International appearance during the tour. He didn't appear for Leicestershire in 1991, but did make three first-class appearances in the 1992 County Championship against Lancashire, Somerset and Nottinghamshire. In his four first-class matches, Hawkes scored 65 runs at an average of 16.25, with a high score of 18. He took 5 wickets with the ball, which came at a bowling average of 32.40, with best figures of 4/18.

Hawkes studied at Durham University, where he appeared in matches for the university first team.
