= Thomas Hare =

Thomas Hare may refer to:

- Thomas Hare (political scientist) (1806–1891), proponent of electoral reform
- Thomas Hare (MP) (1686–1760), Member of Parliament for Truro
- Tom Hare (born 1952), professor and Japanologist
- Tom Hare (veterinary pathologist) (1895–1959), British veterinary pathologist
- Thomas Truxtun Hare (1878–1956), American track and field athlete
- Richard Hare (bishop) (Thomas Richard Hare, 1922–2010), bishop of Pontefract
- Sir Thomas Hare, 2nd Baronet (1658–1693), Member of Parliament for Norfolk, 1685–1689
- Sir Thomas Leigh Hare, 1st Baronet (1859–1941), British Member of Parliament for South West Norfolk, 1892–1906
- Sir Thomas Hare, 5th Baronet (1930–1993), cricketer
