= Rattee =

Rattee is a surname. Notable people with the surname include:

- Claire Rattée, Canadian politician
- James Rattee (1820–1855), British woodcarver

== See also ==
- Rattee and Kett, building contractor
