= Stowbridge =

Village in Norfolk, England

Coordinates: 52°38′13″N 0°22′12″E

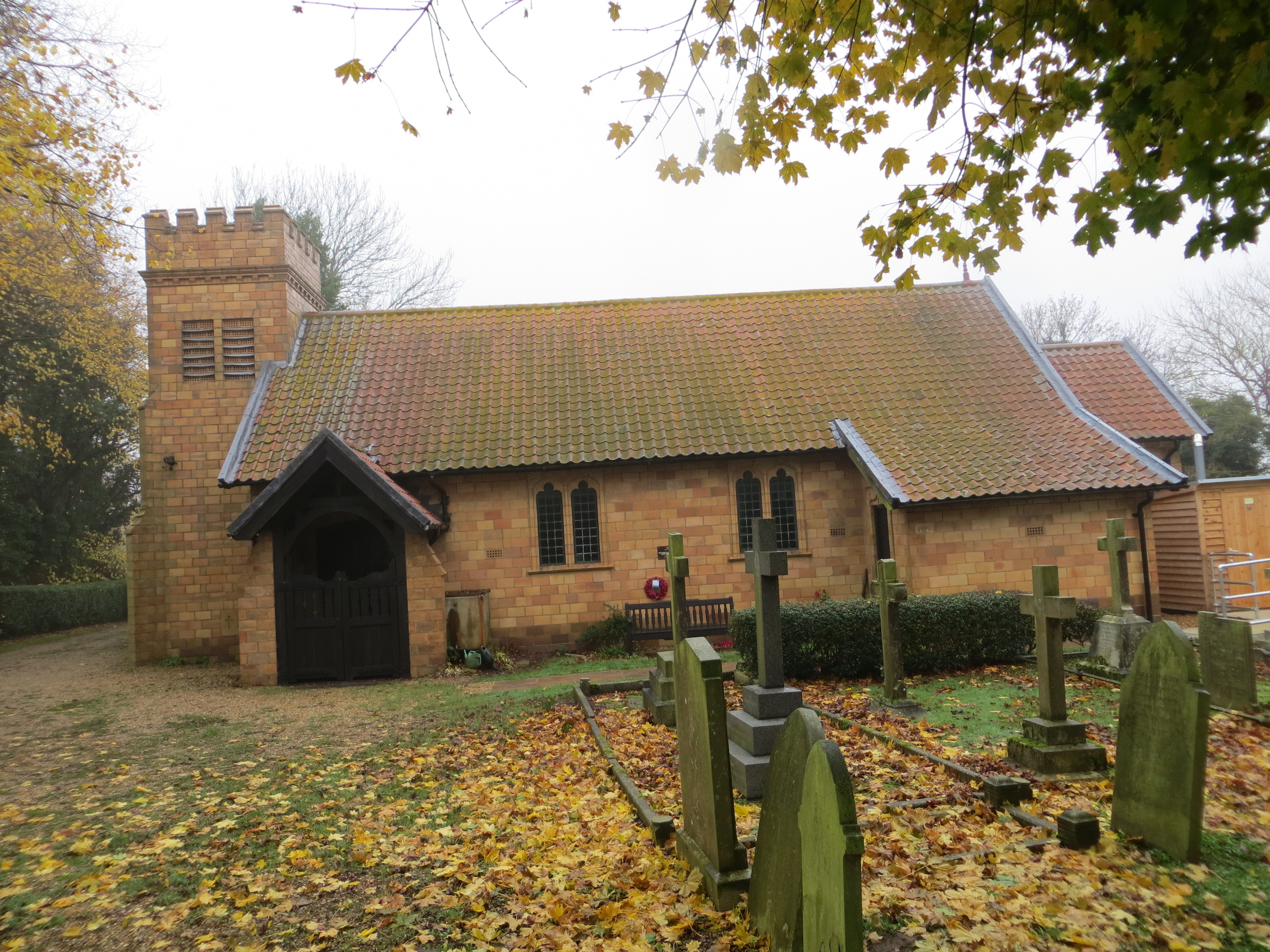
The Church of St Peter at Stow Bridge

Stowbridge or Stow Bridge is a village in the parish of Stow Bardolph, extending into Wiggenhall St Mary Magdalen, in the English county of Norfolk. The parish of Stow Bardolph also includes Barroway Drove. Stowbridge is between Downham Market and King's Lynn on the banks of the River Great Ouse. For the purposes of local government, it falls within the district of King's Lynn and West Norfolk. The Great Ouse, the Relief Channel and the mainline railway from King's Lynn to Cambridge run through the heart of the community.

== History ==
At the time of the Domesday Book in 1085, Stowbridge did not exist, and the Great Ouse did not run through the area. It was largely marshy ground drained by a small river system seemingly referred to in the old documents as the Wiggenhall Eau which ran up through Wiggenhall Parish to Lynn and The Wash. It seems from this record that Runcton Holme and Wiggenhall shared a watermill on this watercourse, and that there were some fisheries in the area.

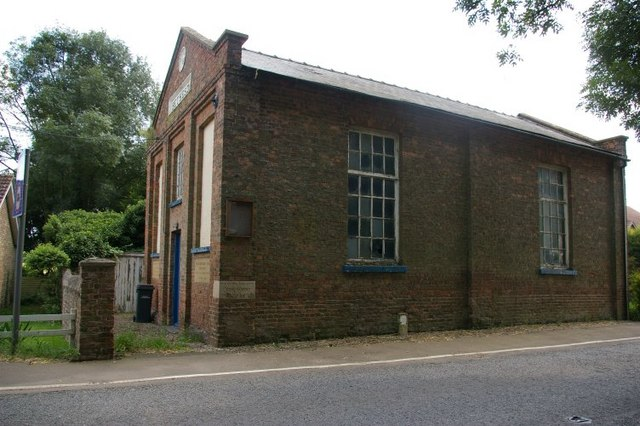
Side view of former Bethesda chapel of the United Methodist Free Churches (1860)

In around 1181, a group of hermetic women arrived from Lynn to set up a community in a "desolate and marshy place" (ref: Register of Crabhouse Nunnery, British Library). This community became regularised in the mid 1180s when the Prior of Raynham gave them a Charter of Incorporation.

After massive flooding from inland water in the early 13th Century which washed away the nunnery such that they had to seek refuge at St Mary Magdalen. It was at this time that the Great Ouse came to run through this area after having breached the watershed near Denver. The nuns returned and refounded the institution, calling it the Priory of St John the Evangelist at Crabhouse - Crabhouse appearing to be the early name for the place. At this time, the first flood defences were built by the nuns and their staff to protect them from the river and floods from the South. The Southern defence still exists as the levee that runs from the bridge to West Head Farm (which is at the west end of the nun's embankment - hence its name).

As Crabhouse Priory grew in wealth and stature, a community developed outside its precinct on the southern side (all this on the west side of the Great Ouse).

At this time, there would not have been a bridge here. That was to come later when the Hares of Stow Bardolph Hall took possession of the lands to the south and west of the old Priory in the era after its dissolution by Henry VIII's commissioners in 1537. After the bridge was built, the place was renamed Stowbridge. An annual livestock fair was held on the first Saturday after Whitsun.

== Church ==
St Peter's Church, on West Head Road, is a Church of England chapel of ease for Stow Bardolph, now shared with the Methodists. It was built of glazed terracotta blocks in 1908 and is a Grade II listed building. The church has a stained glass window to the memory of the Reverend James Adams (1839–1903), vicar of Stow from 1895 to 1902, who had held services in a schoolroom. The communion table was his portable altar, presented by his widow. The Norman font was transferred from Stow Bardolph after 50 years in the Vicarage garden.
