= Hare baronets of Stow Bardolph (1641) =

Escutcheon of the Hare baronets of Stow Bardolph

The Hare baronetcy, of Stow Bardolph in the County of Norfolk, was created in the Baronetage of England on 23 July 1641 for Ralph Hare, Member of Parliament for Norfolk and King's Lynn. He was the great-grandson of Sir Nicholas Hare, Speaker of the House of Commons from 1539 to 1540, who purchased the Stow Bardolph estate in 1553.

The 2nd Baronet also represented Norfolk in the House of Commons. The title became extinct on the death of the 5th Baronet in 1764.

== Hare baronets, of Stow Bardolph (1641) ==
- Sir Ralph Hare, 1st Baronet (1623–1672)
- Sir Thomas Hare, 2nd Baronet (c. 1658–1693)
- Sir Ralph Hare, 3rd Baronet (c. 1681–1732)
- Sir Thomas Hare, 4th Baronet (1690–1760)
- Sir George Hare, 5th Baronet (c. 1701–1764)
