= Dashwood =

Dashwood is an English surname. Notable people with the surname include:

== Real people ==
- Charles Dashwood (judge) (1842–1919), Australian public servant, judge and Government Resident of the Northern Territory
- Charles Dashwood (Royal Navy officer) (1765–1847)
- Francis Dashwood, 11th Baron le Despencer (1708–1781), English rake and politician
- Gemma Dashwood (born 1977), Australian Paralympic swimmer
- George Dashwood (disambiguation), multiple people

- George Dashwood (1669–1706), MP for Sudbury 1703–1705
- George Dashwood (1680–1758), MP for Stockbridge 1710–1713
- Sir George Dashwood, 4th Baronet (1786–1861), MP for Truro 1814–1818
- Sir George Dashwood, 5th Baronet (c. 1790–1862), English landowner, Member of Parliament for Buckinghamshire 1832–1835 and Wycombe 1837–1863
- George Frederick Dashwood (1806–1881), public servant and politician in South Australia
- George Henry Dashwood (1801–1869), British antiquary

- Robert Dashwood (disambiguation), multiple people

- Sir Robert Dashwood, 1st Baronet, MP for Banbury
- Sir Robert Dashwood, 9th Baronet
- Sir Robert Henry Seymour Dashwood, 7th Baronet (1876–1947), of the Dashwood baronets

- Rosamund Dashwood (1924–2007), Canadian long-distance runner
- Tenille Dashwood (born 1989), Australian professional wrestler
- Thomas Dashwood (1876–1929), English cricketer

== Fictional characters ==
- Elinor Dashwood, character in Jane Austen's novel Sense and Sensibility
- Marianne Dashwood, character in Jane Austen's novel Sense and Sensibility
- Mike Dashwood, character in The Bill, 1984–1992
- Henry Dashwood, character in What a Girl Wants, 2003

== See also ==
- Dashwood baronets, British baronetcies
- Dashwood, Ontario, Canada, a small community
