= Golden Noble =

Apple cultivar

'Golden Noble' apple
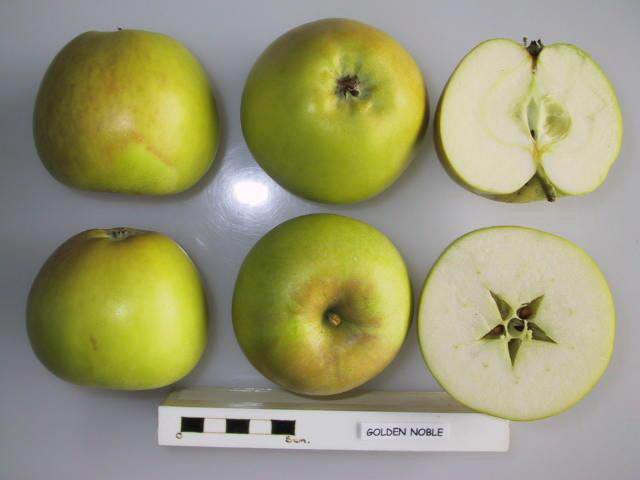
- Genus: Malus
- Species: Malus pumila
- Hybrid parentage: Chance seedling
- Cultivar: 'Golden Noble'
- Origin: England, Downham Market, Norfolk, before 1820

Golden Noble is an old English cultivar of domesticated apple, which is especially used as a cooking apple, since it is resulting in a sweetish puree when cooked and is a good choice for apple sauce.

The fruits of this cultivar are light green and turn yellow gold with ripeness and are very juicy. They are often used for apple cider because of its balanced tart and sweet taste. It is also a popular choice for eating fresh.

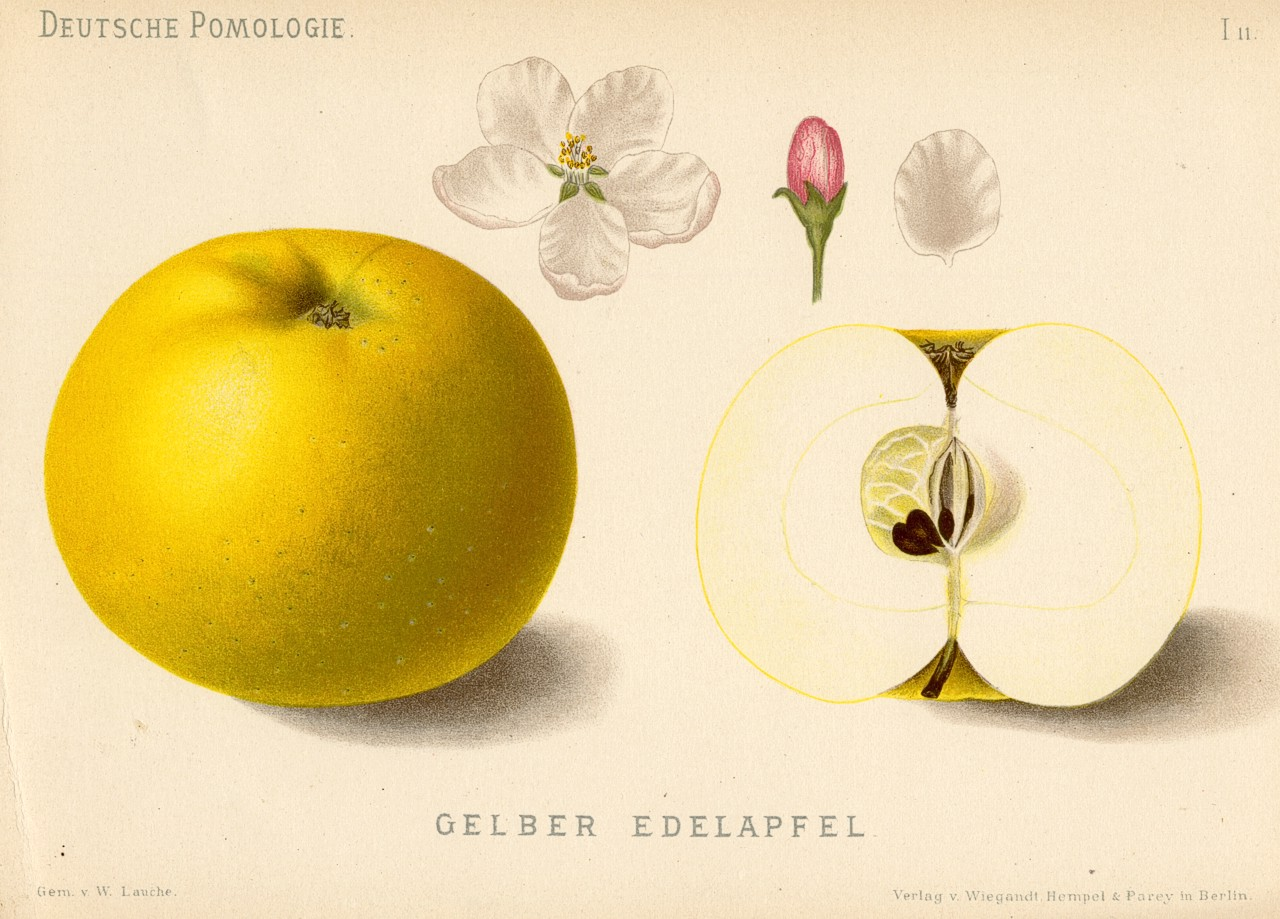
Illustration of the "Golden Noble" apple (German: Gelber Edelapfel), in Deutsche Pomologie (1883)

It was initially discovered, as a chance seedling near Downham Market, Norfolk, by Patrick Flanagan, head gardener for Sir Thomas Hare of Stow Bardolph Hall. He presented it in 1820 to the Horticultural Society of London.

This tree is ideal for gardens, having a neat and tidy growing habit, and producing beautiful flowers. It earned the Award of Garden Merit from the Royal Horticultural Society in 1993. Sugar 12%, acid 18g/litre, vitamin C 24mg/100g.

It is an ancestor for the Edward VII apple.
