= Hare baronets of Stow Hall (1818) =

Escutcheon of the Hare baronets of Stow Hall

The Hare baronetcy, of Stow Hall in the County of Norfolk, was created in the Baronetage of the United Kingdom on 14 December 1818 for Thomas Hare, a soldier of the American Revolutionary War; he was the grandson of Thomas Leigh (a member of the same family as the Barons Leigh), husband of Mary, second daughter of the 2nd Baronet of the 1641 creation, and sister and co-heiress of the 5th Baronet of that creation. Born Thomas Leigh, he assumed by Act of Parliament the surname of Hare in lieu of his patronymic in 1791.

The 3rd Baronet was High Sheriff of Norfolk in 1906.

== Hare baronets, of Stow Hall (1818) ==
- Sir Thomas Hare, 1st Baronet (died 1834)
- Sir Thomas Hare, 2nd Baronet (1807–1880)
- Sir George Ralph Leigh Hare, 3rd Baronet (1866–1933)
- Sir Ralph Leigh Hare, 4th Baronet (1903–1976)
- Sir Thomas Hare, 5th Baronet (1930–1993)
- Sir Philip Leigh Hare, 6th Baronet (1922–2000)
- Sir Nicholas Patrick Hare, 7th Baronet (born 1955)

The heir apparent to the baronetcy is Thomas Edward Hare (born 1986), eldest son of the 7th Baronet.

== Notes ==
Baronetage of the United Kingdom
Preceded by Shelley-Sidney baronets	Hare baronets of Stow Hall; 14 December 1818	Succeeded by Stracey baronets
