= Wimbotsham =

Village in Norfolk, England

Coordinates: 52.61765°N 0.39448°E

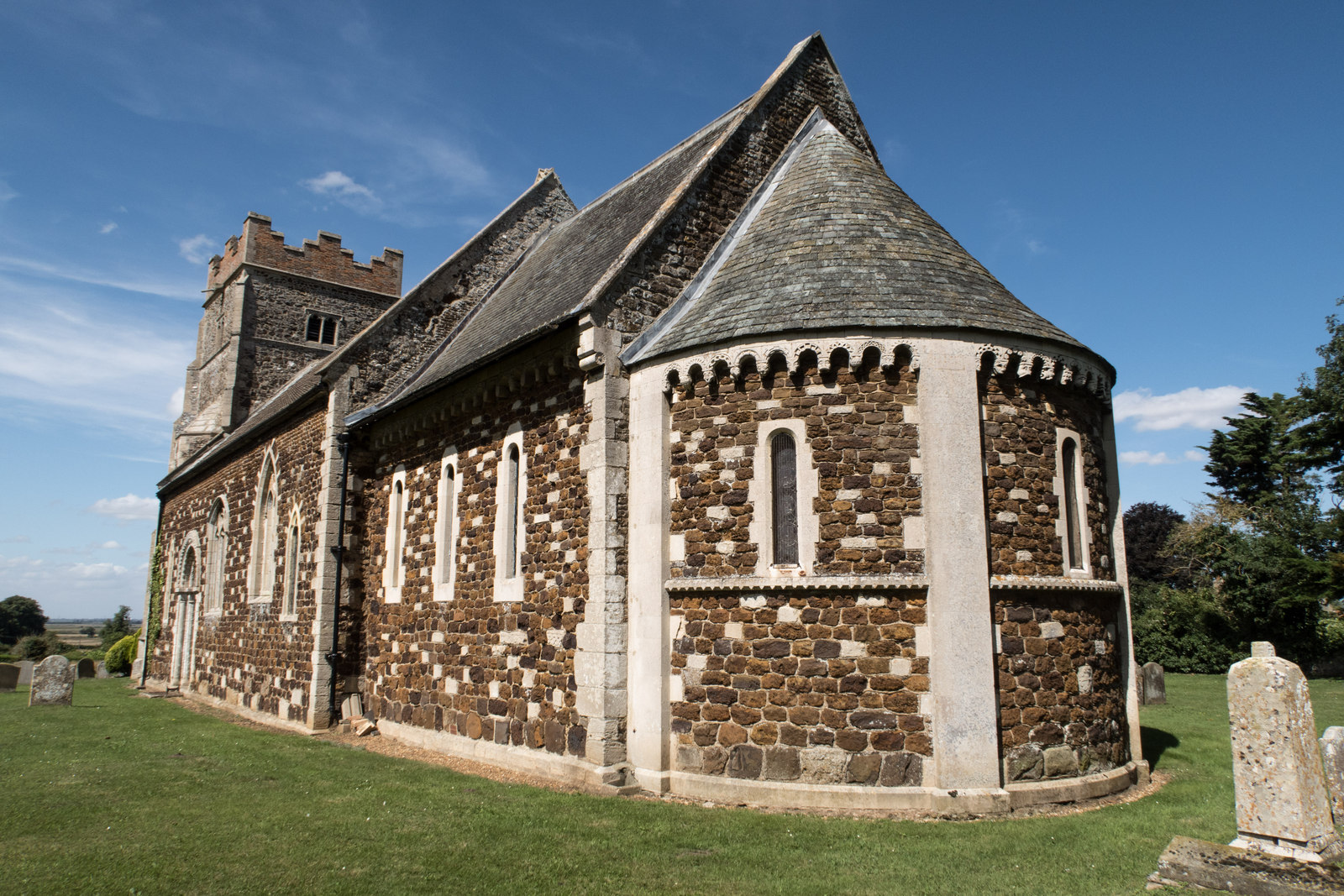
- St Mary's, Wimbotsham before the 2019 fire

- Location within Norfolk
- Area: 6.04 km^{2} (2.33 sq mi)
- Population: 664 (2011)
  - Density: 110/km^{2} (280/sq mi)
- OS grid reference: TF622049
- Civil parish: Wimbotsham
- District: King's Lynn and West Norfolk
- Shire county: Norfolk
- Region: East
- Country: England
- Sovereign state: United Kingdom
- Post town: KING'S LYNN
- Postcode district: PE34
- Police: Norfolk
- Fire: Norfolk
- Ambulance: East of England

Wimbotsham is a village and civil parish in the English county of Norfolk. It is situated close to the River Great Ouse, 2 km (1.2 mi) north of the town of Downham Market, 18 km (11 mi) south of the town of King's Lynn, and 60 km (37 mi) west of the city of Norwich. It covers an area of 6.04 km^{2} (2.33 sq mi) and had a population of 558 in 262 households at the 2001 census, the population including Bexwell and increasing to 664 at the 2011 Census. For the purposes of local government, it falls within the district of King's Lynn and West Norfolk.

The villages name means 'Winebaud's homestead/village' or 'Winebaud's hemmed-in land'.

It has a primary school, a local shop and a public house called "The Chequers". Also located in the village are two churches: the Church of St Mary and the Wimbotsham Methodist Church.

== Governance ==
Wimbotsham is part of the electoral ward called Wimbotsham with Fincham. The population of this ward at the 2011 Census was 2,504.

== Church of St Mary ==
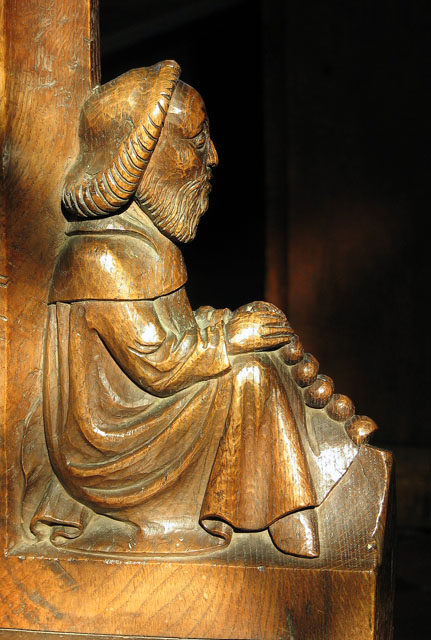
Bench end in St Mary's by James Rattee

The Grade II* listed St Mary's Church is the Church of England parish church. The parish is part of the West Norfolk Priory Group.

The church is believed to have been built in 1175, with some late 13th century work, and both north and south doors are believed Norman, dating from the 12th century. A medieval wall painting of St Christopher is recorded in the nave. In 1853/4 the roof of the nave was altered from thatch to slate with the walls raised to suit. The original chancel was rebuilt complete with an apse over what was thought to be a prior structure. The church's bench ends, although in the Suffolk style of the 15th century, are actually the work of James Rattee in the 19th century. It has three bells.

On 4 September 2019, the church was severely damaged by a large fire. The roof of the nave collapsed and wooden fittings inside the building including carvings by Rattee were destroyed. The bells, which had cracked in the fire, were taken down from the tower in August 2020.

Plans for a full restoration were approved in May 2024 and work is underway in 2026.

== Methodist Church ==
As well as the Church of England St Mary's, there is also Wimbotsham Methodist Church. The chapel was opened in 1894 with additions being made in 1896 in the form of a Sunday School. Further alterations were made in 1950 and 1970. The Minister is Reverend Maurice Stafford.

== Wimbotsham and Stow Community School ==
The village primary school is called the Wimbotsham and Stow Community School, which is a community school under the Bridges Federation, along with two other local primary schools located in Magdalen and St Germans. The executive headteacher is Ms Alison Hughes, but the head of this school is Louise Arrowsmith.

== Fenman Classic Bike Show ==
Since 1990, Wimbotsham has been the location of the Fenman Classic Bike Show, an annual bike show held on the last Monday of every August, to coincide with a United Kingdom bank holiday. The logo depicts a farm-hand with smock and floppy hat, holding a mug of ale and standing in front of a bike's silhouette. Overall the Fenman Classic Bike Show offers 27 prizes, including the "Best Bike in Show" prize.
