= George Henry Dashwood =

British antiquarian

George Henry Dashwood (21 October 1801 – 9 February 1869) was a British antiquary.

== Life ==
Dashwood was born at Downham Market, Norfolk, on 21 October 1801, the son of the Rev. James Dashwood, rector of Doddington, Isle of Ely, by his second wife, Sarah, daughter of the Rev. David Lloyd, LL.D. After spending five terms at Christ's College, Cambridge, he transferred to Lincoln College, Oxford, from where he graduated B.A. in 1824, and M.A. in 1825. He was ordained deacon and priest in the latter year by the Bishop of Oxford, and was for some years curate of Wellesbourne, Warwickshire.

He was curate of Stow Bardolph, Norfolk, as early as 1840; and in 1852 his friend, Sir Thomas Hare, presented him to the vicarage of Stow Bardolph with Wimbotsham, a living worth more than £500 per annum. He was early attracted to the study of antiquities by the rich stores of ancient documents preserved in the muniment room of his patron at Stow Hall. In February 1843 he exhibited to the Society of Antiquaries of London from that collection a book of the swan marks of the River Ouse, from the time of Queen Elizabeth I. On 6 June 1844 he was elected a Fellow of the Society. He had then nearly completed at his private press a small volume (in a limited edition of only 36 copies) entitled Vice-Comites Norfolciae, or Sheriffs of Norfolk from the first year of Henry the Second to the fourth of Queen Victoria. On 24 February 1846 he submitted to the inspection of the Society of Antiquaries a series of drawings representing seals in the archives of Stow Hall, and afterwards had them engraved at his own expense, the first series in 1847, under the title of Sigilla Antiqua, and a second series in 1862. In 1859 he exhibited to the Society, also from Stow Bardolph, a roll entitled Magnus Annulus, a sort of calendar extending from 1286 to 1817, and containing genealogical notices of the Hare family. Again, in 1861 he exhibited a mortuary roll of the abbey of West Dereham; and in 1863 a marriage contract of Thomas Bardolfe.

After the Norfolk and Norwich Archaeological Society had been established in 1845, Dashwood communicated many valuable papers to the first five volumes of its journal, Norfolk Archaeology. In 1863 he undertook to edit for the same society Pedes Finium, or Fines respecting Norfolk from the third year of Richard I, of which only sixteen pages were completed. A much more important work on which he was engaged, with his friend, Joseph Jackson Howard, LL.D., was the earliest heraldic visitation of Norfolk, 1563, accompanied by a supplement of illustrative documents, and with many of the pedigrees brought down to modern times. The Historical Notices of Fincham, co. Norfolk. By the Rev. William Blythe, Lynn, 1863, was enriched with a series of Fincham pedigrees which were actually put in type by Dashwood, and printed at his private press. His last work was the printing a selection of pedigrees from the visitation of Warwickshire in 1682, of which only 12 copies were struck off (there is no copy in the British Library).

Dashwood died after a few days' illness, while on a visit to Captain W. E. G. Bulwer at Quebec House, East Dereham, Norfolk, on 9 February 1869. He was buried at Stow Bardolph on 18 February.

== Personal life ==
Dashwood married Marianne, daughter of W. H. Turner, and widow of Dr Henry Job of the 13th Light Dragoons. She died without issue in 1855.
