= Robert Dashwood =

Robert Dashwood may refer to:

- Sir Robert Dashwood, 1st Baronet (1662–1734), MP for Banbury
- Sir Robert Dashwood, 9th Baronet (1859–1908)
- Sir Robert Henry Seymour Dashwood, 7th Baronet (1876–1947), of the Dashwood baronets

== See also ==
- Dashwood
