= Sir Thomas Hare, 2nd Baronet =

Sir Thomas Hare, 2nd Baronet (c. 1658 – 1 January 1693), was a member of the East Anglian gentry and a Member of the Parliament of England.

== Life ==
He was the eldest son of Sir Ralph Hare, 1st Baronet (died 1672), by his first wife; her name is unknown. He attended Caius College, Cambridge, from 1672, the year in which he also succeeded his father in the baronetcy. His guardian was Sir Horatio Townshend, but his tutor at Cambridge was Dr Robert Brady. He headed his tenants at the county election in February 1679 but was still too young to replace Sir Christopher Calthorpe as MP for Norfolk in 1679. On 20 April 1680 he married Elizabeth Dashwood, daughter of a merchant from Hackney named George Dashwood. They had four sons and five daughters. One of the younger sons, Thomas, was a Tory MP for Truro from 1713 to 1715.

Also in 1680 he became a justice of the peace, followed by deputy lieutenant of Norfolk in 1683. Robert Paston nominated him as a pro-Charles II candidate for Norfolk in 1681, but he lost the election, only to win in 1685. In 1682 he became a freeman of King's Lynn and was one of the Norfolk signatories to the loyal address critiquing the Association. On questioning by the Lord Lieutenant of Norfolk he refused to support repealing the Penal Laws and Test Acts against Roman Catholics. This led to his removal from his deputy lieutenancy and his post as JP in February 1688 and in October that year he was offered a return to the bench but refused, since he would have to sit on the bench with Roman Catholics. After the Glorious Revolution he seems to have become a non-juror. He was only 35 at his death and was buried in Stow Bardolph. He was succeeded by his eldest son, Sir Ralph Hare, who became the 3rd Baronet.

Parliament of England
| Preceded by Sir John Hobart, Bt. Sir Peter Gleane, Bt. | Member of Parliament for Norfolk; 1685-1689; With: Sir Jacob Astley, Bt. | Succeeded by Sir William Cook, Bt. Sir Henry Hobart, Bt. |
Baronetage of England
| Preceded by Ralph Hare | Baronet (of Stow Bardolph); 1672-1693 | Succeeded by Ralph Hare |
