= Ashwell, Rutland =

Village in Rutland, England

Coordinates: 52.716°N 0.720°W

Ashwell
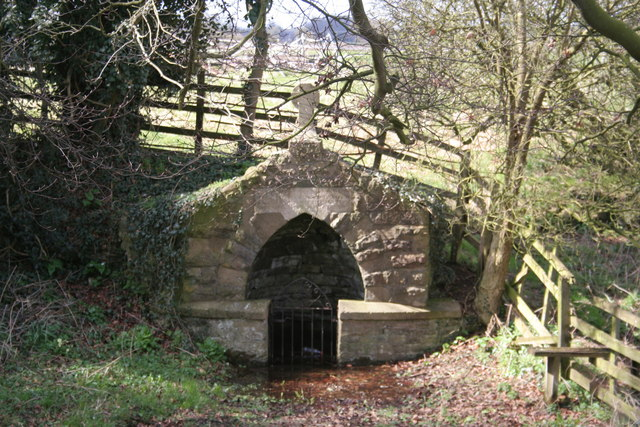
- The well at Ashwell

- Location within Rutland
- Area: 2.87 sq mi (7.4 km^{2})
- Population: 290 2001 census
  - Density: 104/sq mi (40/km^{2})
- OS grid reference: SK865137
  - London: 88 miles (142 km) SSE
- Unitary authority: Rutland
- Shire county: Rutland
- Ceremonial county: Rutland
- Region: East Midlands
- Country: England
- Sovereign state: United Kingdom
- Post town: OAKHAM
- Postcode district: LE15
- Dialling code: 01572
- Police: Leicestershire
- Fire: Leicestershire
- Ambulance: East Midlands
- UK Parliament: Rutland and Stamford

Ashwell is a village and civil parish in the county of Rutland in the East Midlands of England. It is about 3 miles (5 km) north of Oakham.

== Toponymy ==
The village's name means 'spring or stream with ash trees'.

== Demography ==
The population of the civil parish was 290 at the 2001 census falling to 269 at the 2011 census.

== Church ==
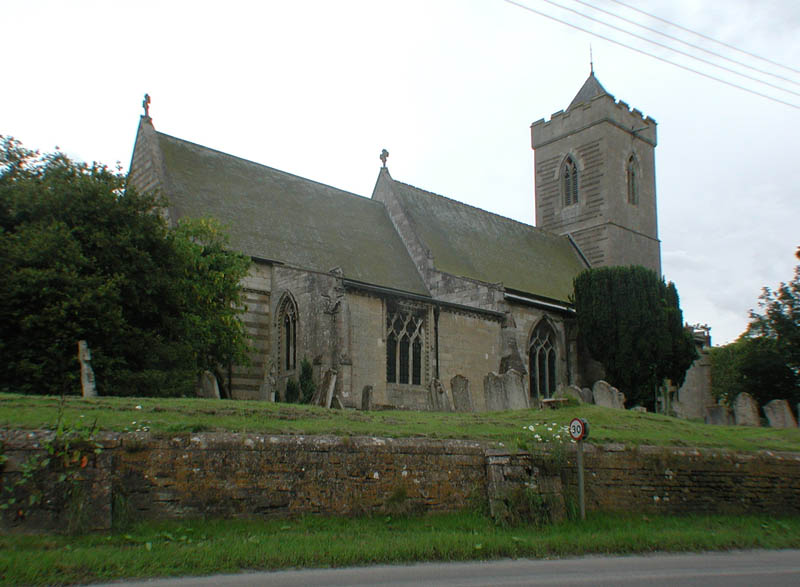
St Mary's Church, Ashwell

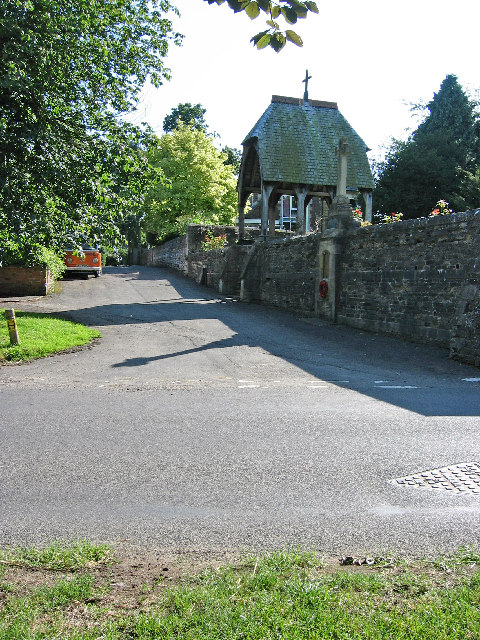
Lychgate in Ashwell

St Mary's church is mainly of 14th-century origin, but in 1851 it underwent a major restoration by William Butterfield. James Adams (died 1903), rector, who won a Victoria Cross in Afghanistan in 1879, is buried in the churchyard.

The Royalist rector, Thomas Mason, was ejected in 1644 and Richard Levett (or Levet) was intruded in his place on 13 May 1646. The previous incumbent was reinstated in 1660 when Charles II was restored to the throne and served for twenty years until his death. The minister Levett was the father of Sir Richard Levett who was possibly born in Ashwell; he was Lord Mayor of London in 1699 and owner of Kew Palace. Levett Blackborne, grandson of Sir Richard, who sold the Levett properties at Kew to the Royal Family, was a barrister and longtime adviser to Charles Manners, 4th Duke of Rutland.

== Prominent nearby buildings ==
Ashwell Hall stands in a small park about half a mile south of the village. It was built in 1879 in the Tudor style.

Ashwell Prison, a former Category C prison, was located about 2 miles (3 km) south of the centre of the village but actually in the parish of Burley. Previously the site was a Second World War US army base, home to part of the 82nd Airborne Division, along with Wollaton Park. The prison closed in March 2011 and has been redeveloped as Oakham Enterprise Park, a business park for office and light industrial use.

The previous kennels of the Cottesmore Hunt, opposite the prison, have been converted to residential use and the hunt kennels are now based at a farm in the parish.

== Notable people and families ==
The Palmes family of Lindley, West Yorkshire was also seated at Ashwell. The family, a branch of the Palmes family of Naburn Hall, Yorkshire, included Sir Guy Palmes, High Sheriff of Yorkshire.

- James Adams (died 1903), rector, who won a Victoria Cross in Afghanistan in 1879, is buried in the churchyard.
- Sir Richard Levett, Lord Mayor of London in 1699 and owner of Kew Palace, possibly born in Ashwell.
- Aviator Beryl Markham (née Clutterbuck) was born in Westfield House and lived here until her family moved to Kenya when she was four years old.
