= Thomas Hare (MP) =

British politician (1686–1760)

Sir Thomas Hare, 4th Baronet (1686–1760) Stow Bardolph, Norfolk was a British politician who sat in the House of Commons between 1713 and 1715.

Hare was the second son of Sir Thomas Hare, 2nd Baronet of Stow Hall and his wife Elizabeth Dashwood, daughter of George Dashwood of Hackney. He entered Oriel College, Oxford in 1703.

At the 1713 Hare was returned as Member of Parliament for Truro. He opposed the Hanoverian Succession, and in June was awarded a post as first register and clerk of the crown in Barbados. On the accession of George I of Great Britain, Hare was deprived of his post. He faced impeachment as a member of the previous administration and did not stand for parliament in 1715. He succeeded his brother Ralph as 4th Baronet on 22 September 1732.

He died on 21 February 1760, having married Rosamond, the daughter of Charles Newby of Hooton, Yorkshire. He left 2 daughters and was therefore succeeded by his younger brother George. George died unmarried four years later and the baronetcy then became extinct (although revived in 1818). Stow Hall passed to their sister Mary (married to Thomas Leigh) and her descendants, who later changed their name to Hare.

Parliament of Great Britain
Preceded by Hugh Boscawen; Henry Vincent	Member of Parliament for Truro; 1713– 1715; With: William Collier	Succeeded by John Selwyn; Spencer Cowper
Baronetage of England
Preceded by Ralph Hare	Baronet (of Stow Bardolph); 1732-1760	Succeeded by George Hare
