= Stracey baronets =

Baronetcy in the Baronetage of the United Kingdom

Escutcheon of the Stracey baronets of Rackheath

The Stracey baronetcy, of Rackheath in the county of Norfolk, is a title in the baronetage of the United Kingdom. It was created on 15 December 1818 for Edward Stracey. He was the eldest surviving son of Sir John Stracey, chief judge of the Sheriff's Court and a recorder of London.

The 5th baronet served as High Sheriff of Norfolk in 1871 and sat as conservative member of parliament for Norfolk East, Great Yarmouth and Norwich. The 7th baronet was High Sheriff of Norfolk in 1928; his daughter Rosalind Stracey (1907–2005) was a sculptor.

== Stracey baronets, of Rackheath (1818) ==
- Sir Edward Stracey, 1st Baronet (1741–1829)
- Sir Edward Hardinge John Stracey, 2nd Baronet (1768–1851)
- Sir George Stracey, 3rd Baronet (1770–1854)
- Sir Josias Henry Stracey, 4th Baronet (1771–1855)
- Sir Henry Josias Stracey, 5th Baronet (1802–1885)
- Sir Edward Henry Gervase Stracey, 6th Baronet (1838–1888)
- Sir Edward Paulet Stracey, 7th Baronet (1871–1949)
- Sir Michael George Motley Stracey, 8th Baronet (1911–1971)
- Sir John Simon Stracey, 9th Baronet (1938–2022)
- Sir Rupert Stracey, supposed 10th Baronet (born 1951), has no heir. The Official Roll as of 2026 marks the baronetcy as vacant.

Baronetage of the United Kingdom
Preceded by Hare baronets	Stracey baronets of Rackheath; 15 December 1818	Succeeded by Shiffner baronets
