= St Mary's Church, Ashwell, Rutland =

Church in Ashwell, Rutland

Coordinates: 52.7145°N 0.7199°W

St Mary's Church, Ashwell
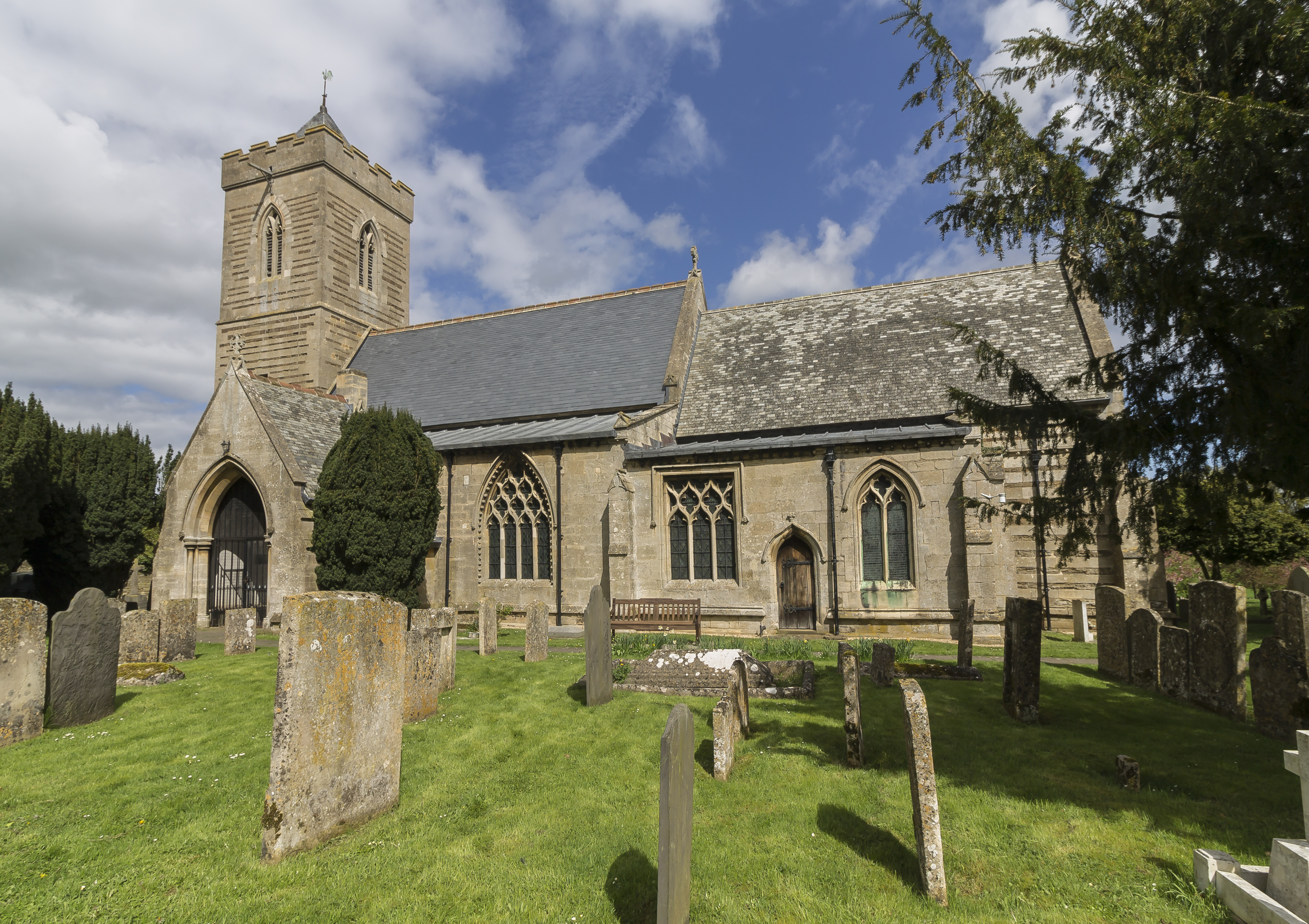
- Denomination: Church of England

History
- Dedication: St Mary

Administration
- Diocese: Peterborough
- Parish: Ashwell, Rutland

Clergy
- Vicar(s): Stephen Griffiths

St Mary's Church is a Church of England parish church in Ashwell, Rutland. It is a Grade I listed building.

== History ==
The church has a restored chancel with northern and southern chapels.

The church has northern and southern aisles, a southern chapel, a northern chapel (which is now an organ chamber and vestry), a chancel and a western tower. The oldest fabric in the church, dating from the 12th century, is the western bay of the northern arcade. Most of the church however, dates from the 13th and 14th centuries. Some parts date from 1851 when restoration was carried out by William Butterfield. The font was donated by Viscountess Downe.

The church has no clerestory and the aisles have no parapets. The northern aisle dates from c. 1190 but most of the church dates to the 13th century, when it was rebuilt. The church has ball-flower decoration dating from the 14th century. The tower dates back to the rebuilding in the 14th century.

William Butterfield restored the church for Viscount Downe. It was Butterfield's only major work in Rutland and Leicestershire. He was responsible for the new fittings, floors and roofs, and the southern porch. The font was also built during the restoration.

There is a wooden effigy, situated in the southern chapel, to a knight, possibly a member of the Tuchet family. There is also a slab dedicated to John Vernam and his wife. The slab is now covered in graffiti from the 17th century. Situated also in the northern chapel is an alabaster effigy to a priest situated upon an earlier, graffiti-covered tomb.

A rector, James Adams, who won a Victoria Cross in Afghanistan in 1879, is buried in the churchyard.

== Church bells ==
The church tower has six bells.
