= Crabhouse Priory =

Monastic house in Norfolk, England

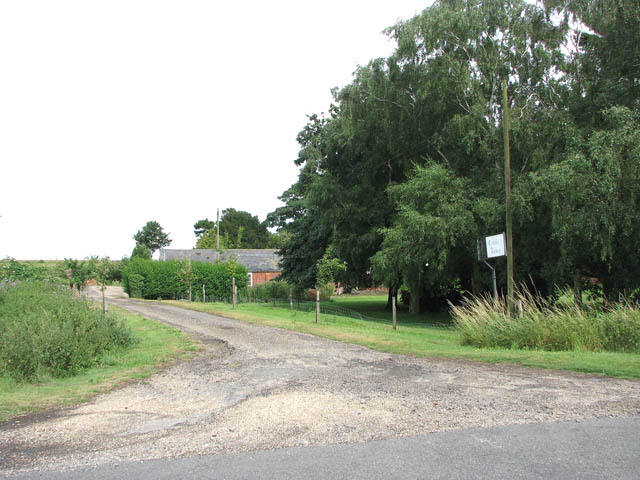
Crabbs Farm, Crabbs Abbey

Crabhouse Priory was a medieval monastic house in Norfolk, England.

The Priory of St Mary the Virgin and St John the Evangelist was a House of Augustinian Nuns founded in the late 12th Century in the south of the parish of Wiggenhall (now the parish of Wiggenhall St Mary Magdalen) in the Fens. This site is now on the west bank of the Great Ouse between King's Lynn and Downham Market in the County of Norfolk. When the Priory was founded, the Great Ouse did not flow this way, and a little old watercourse was in the marsh ground that is now Stowbridge.

For its history, see the discussion of the Register of Crabhouse Nunnery (1889) by Mary Bateson.

The priory was dissolved during the reign of Henry VIII, and most of the monastic buildings were partially demolished during the next 20 years. The agro-industrial complex and the lodgings were maintained for farming purposes, and the Estate remained largely intact until the mid twentieth Century.

The main monastic complex existed on the site of the current house known as Crabbs Abbey, at Stowbridge in the southernmost part of the parish of Wiggenhall St Mary Magdalen. The monastic fishponds were located to the south of the main house.

Much of the agricultural precinct extended over the current boundaries of the property.

One of the most interesting of the British monastic documents called the Register of Crabhouse or The Crabhouse Cartulary exists in the British Library. This is a record of many of the major events of the Priory from its founding through to the Dissolution.

== Prioresses of Crabhouse ==
- Catherine
- Cecilia, 1249
- Christian of Tilney, c. 1270
- Agnes of Methelwold, elected 1315
- Margaret Costayn of Lynn, elected 1342
- Olive of Swaffham, elected 1344
- Cecilia of Welle, elected 1351
- Cecilia Beaupre, elected and died 1395
- Matilda Talbot, elected 1395
- Joan Wiggenhall, elected 1420
- Margaret Dawbeny, elected 1445
- Etheldreda Wulmer, elected 1469.
- Elizabeth Bredon, occurs c. 1500, 1514
- Margaret Studefeld, until 1537, last prioress
