= George Dashwood =

George Dashwood may refer to:

- George Dashwood (1669–1706), Member of Parliament for Sudbury 1703–1705
- George Dashwood (1680–1758), Member of Parliament for Stockbridge 1710–1713
- Sir George Dashwood, 4th Baronet (1786–1861), Member of Parliament for Truro 1814–1818
- Sir George Dashwood, 5th Baronet (c. 1790–1862), English landowner, Member of Parliament for Buckinghamshire 1832–1835 and Wycombe 1837–1863
- Sir George Dashwood, 6th Baronet (1851–1933), English landowner
- George Frederick Dashwood (1806–1881), public servant and politician in South Australia
- George Henry Dashwood (1801–1869), British antiquary
