= Rattee and Kett =

Former British building contractor

- Industry: Construction
- Founded: 1843
- Founder: James Rattee
- Defunct: 2011
- Fate: Acquired
- Successor: Mowlem
- Headquarters: Cambridge, UK

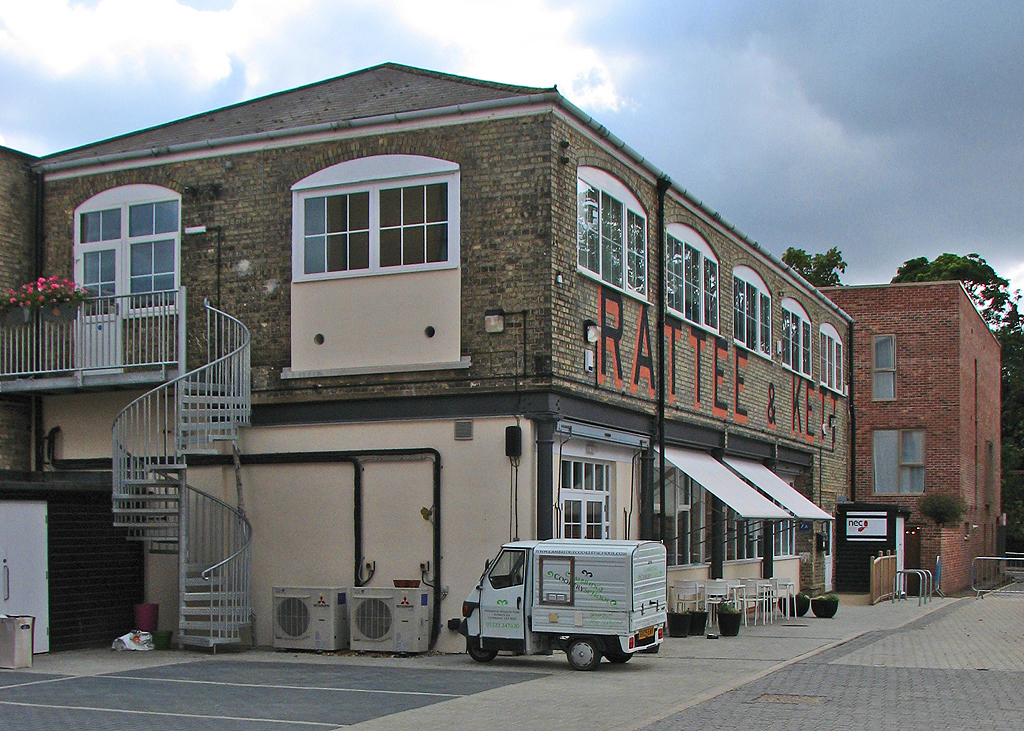
Offices of Rattee and Kett in Cambridge

Rattee and Kett was a building contractor based in Cambridge.

== History ==
The business was founded by James Rattee in 1843. After George Kett joined the business in 1848, the partners worked together on the wood carvings for the Palace of Westminster. Other early projects included the reredos at Ely Cathedral completed in 1857 and ornate tables, ceilings and urns at Wimpole Hall completed in the 1850s and 1860s.

Projects undertaken in the late 19th century included a new hall and library at Pembroke College, Cambridge completed in the 1878, new lecture rooms at Gonville and Caius College, Cambridge completed in 1884 and the construction of Our Lady and the English Martyrs Church in Cambridge completed in 1890 as well as the new chapel in Walnut Tree Court at Queens' College, Cambridge completed in 1891. The restoration of Arundel Castle was a major undertaking completed in 1900.

The company was acquired by Mowlem in 1926. Later projects included restoration work at St James's Church, Piccadilly completed after the Second World War, restoration work at Westminster Abbey completed in the 1980s and restoration work at Ely Cathedral completed in 2000. Following the acquisition of Mowlem by Carillion in February 2006, Rattee and Kett was the subject of a management buyout from Carillion in March 2007 but went into administration in September 2011.
