= James Adams (chaplain) =

Recipient of the Victoria Cross (1839–1903)

The Reverend James Adams VC KHC
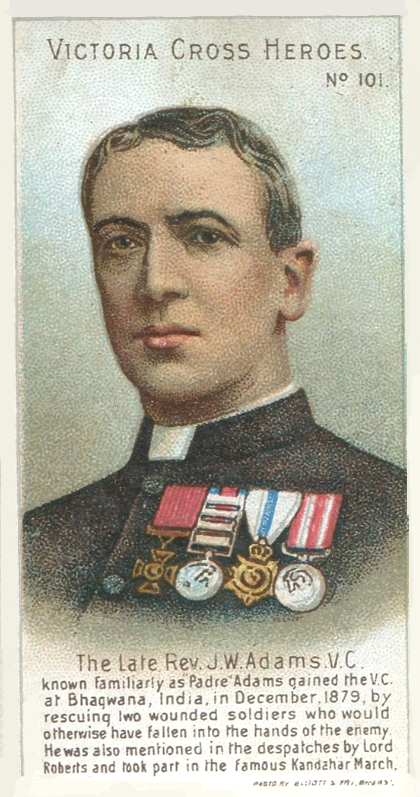
- Reverend James Adams on a cigarette card
- Born: 24 November 1839; Cork, Ireland
- Died: 20 October 1903 (aged 63); Ashwell, Rutland
- Burial place: Churchyard of St Mary's Church, Ashwell, Rutland
- Military career
- Allegiance: United Kingdom
- Branch: Bengal Ecclesiastical Department
- Conflicts: Second Anglo-Afghan War; Third Anglo-Burmese War
- Awards: Victoria Cross; Mentioned in Despatches (3)
- Other work: Honorary Chaplain to King Edward VII

James Williams Adams VC (24 November 1839 – 20 October 1903) was an Irish Anglican chaplain and a recipient of the Victoria Cross, the highest award for gallantry in the face of the enemy that can be awarded to British and Commonwealth forces. He was the first clergyman, and the last of five civilians, to be awarded the VC.

== Early life ==
Adams was born in Cork, Ireland on 24 November 1839. He was the only son of James O'Brien Adams, magistrate, and his wife, Elizabeth Williams.

He was educated at Hamblin and Porter's Grammar School, Cork, and Trinity College, Dublin, and ordained in 1863. His first curacy was in Hyde, Hampshire, from 1863 to 1865 and then at Shottesbrooke, Berkshire, from 1865 to 1866. In October 1866 Adams became a chaplain on the Bengal establishment under Bishop Robert Milman at Calcutta.

== Victoria Cross ==
Reverend James Williams Adams was 40 years old, and a chaplain in the Bengal Ecclesiastical Department (serving as chaplain to the Kabul Field Force), British Indian Army during the Second Afghan War when on 11 December 1879 he carried out the actions for which he was awarded the VC. The citation was published in a supplement to the London Gazette of 24 August 1881 (dated 26 August 1881) and read:

War Office, August 24, 1881.

THE Queen having been graciously pleased, by Warrant under Her Royal Sign Manual, bearing date the 6th of August, 1881, to direct that the decoration of the Victoria Cross shall be conferred on Members of the Indian Ecclesiastical Establishments who may be qualified to receive the same, in accordance with the rules and ordinances made and ordained for the government thereof, provided that it be established in any case that the person was serving under the orders of a General or other Officer in command of Troops in the Field when he performed the act of bravery for which it is proposed to confer the decoration :—

Her Majesty has accordingly been pleased to signify Her intention to confer this high distinction on the undermentioned gentleman, whose claim to the same has been submitted for Her Majesty's approval on account of his conspicuous bravery in Afghanistan as recorded against his name, viz. :—

Bengal Ecclesiastical Establishment, late Chaplain to the Kabul Field Force, The Reverend J. W. Adams

During the action at Killa Kazi, on the 11th December, 1879, some men of the 9th Lancers having fallen, with their horses, into a wide and deep "nullah" or ditch, and the enemy being close upon them, the Reverend J. W. Adams rushed into the water (which filled the ditch), dragged the horses from off the men upon whom they were lying, and extricated them, he being at the time under a heavy fire, and up to his waist in water.

At this time the Afghans were pressing on very rapidly, the leading men getting within a few yards of Mr. Adams, who having let go his horse in order to render more effectual assistance, had eventually to escape on foot.

For the above actions Adams was recommended for the VC by General Sir Frederick Roberts. Along with the Presbyterian and Roman Catholic chaplains who also accompanied the force, Adams was three times mentioned in dispatches during the campaign. He received his medal from Queen Victoria at Buckingham Palace on 1 December 1881.

== Later career and life ==
On 16 August 1881 at Iver Heath, he married Alice Mary (1848-1938), eldest daughter of Sir Thomas Willshire, 1st Baronet; they had a daughter, Edith, who married Geoffry Northcote.

In 1885 he accompanied the field force under General Roberts in Burma, and he took part in the operations there.

Returning to England he was the rector of Postwick (1887–94) and vicar of Stow Bardolph (1895–1902) in Norfolk. In 1902 he was instituted rector of Ashwell, Rutland.

Adams was appointed an honorary chaplain to the Prince of Wales on 7 May 1900, and following the Prince's accession as King Edward VII he was confirmed in the post of honorary chaplain to the King on 23 July 1901. After the resignation of Reverend Handley Moule to become bishop in September 1901, Adams was appointed one of twelve chaplains-in-ordinary to the King.

Adams died on 20 October 1903 and was buried on 24 October in the churchyard of St Mary's Church, Ashwell, Rutland where he was rector. His grave was restored in 2007.

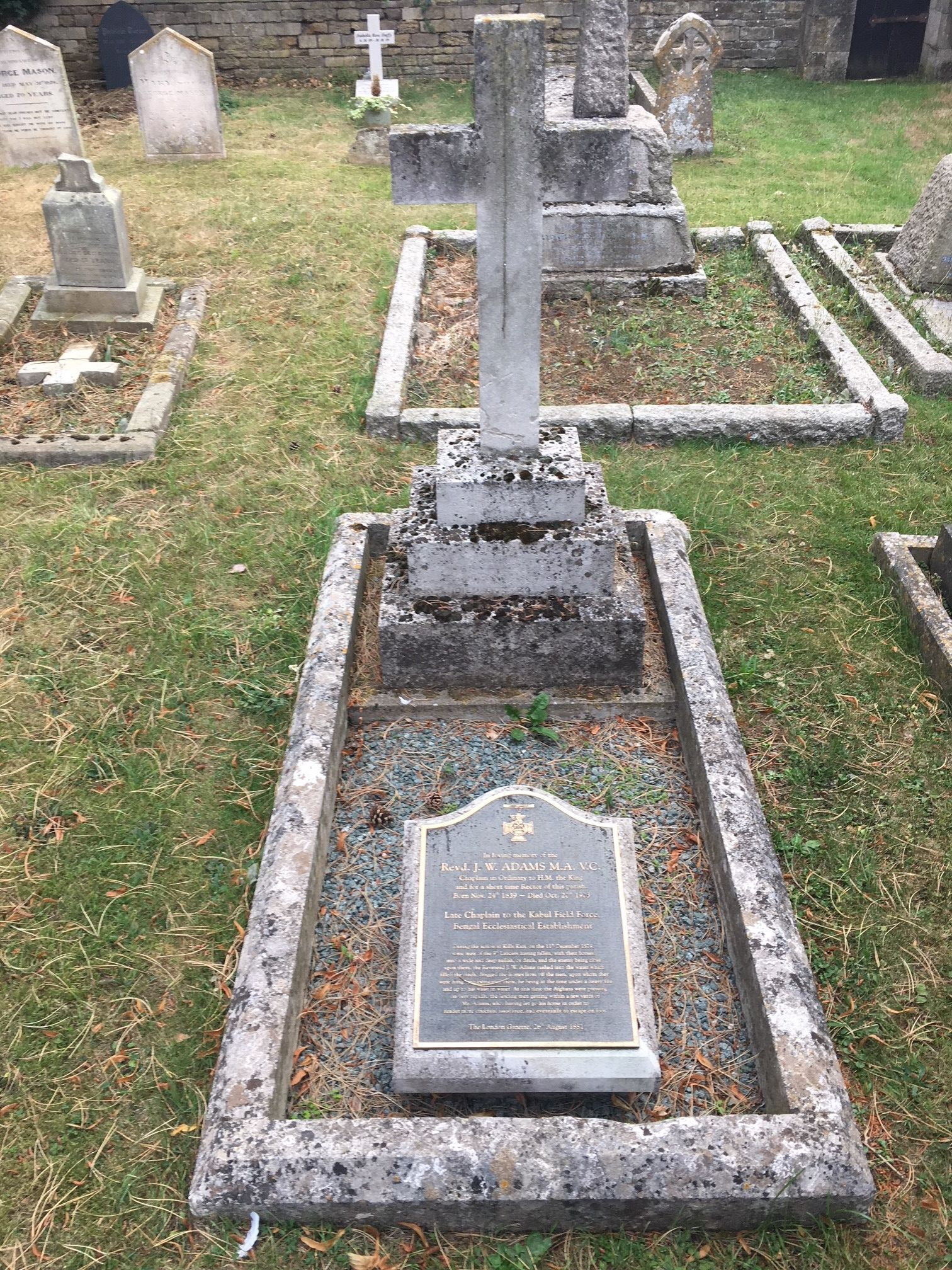
The grave of James Adams in the churchyard of St Mary's, Ashwell

== See also ==
- Siege of the Sherpur Cantonment
