= Sir Thomas Hare, 5th Baronet =

English cricketer

Personal information
- Full name: Thomas Hare
- Born: 27 July 1930; Westminster, London, England
- Died: 25 January 1993 (aged 62); King's Lynn, Norfolk, England
- Batting: Right-handed
- Bowling: Right-arm fast-medium

Domestic team information
- Years: Team
- 1947–1954: Norfolk
- 1953: Cambridge University

Career statistics
Competition	First-class
Matches	10
Runs scored	218
Batting average	13.62
100s/50s	–/–
Top score	47
Balls bowled	1,512
Wickets	19
Bowling average	39.68
5 wickets in innings	1
10 wickets in match	–
Best bowling	5/35
Catches/stumpings	5/–
- Source: Cricinfo, 4 June 2019

Sir Thomas Hare, 5th Baronet (27 July 1930 – 25 January 1993) was an English first-class cricketer. Hare played first-class cricket for Cambridge University and the Free Foresters in 1953–54. He succeeded his father as the 5th Baronet of the Stow Hall Baronetcy in 1976, before being succeeded by his cousin upon his death in 1993.

== Life and first-class cricket ==
The son of Sir Ralph Hare and his wife, Doreen Pleasance Anna Bagge, he was born at Westminster in July 1930. He was educated at Eton College, before going up to Magdalene College, Cambridge. He debuted in minor counties cricket for Norfolk in the 1947 Minor Counties Championship. In between leaving Eton and going up to the University of Cambridge, Hare carried out his National Service with the Coldstream Guards as a second lieutenant in June 1949, with promotion to the rank of lieutenant in December 1950. While at Cambridge he made his debut in first-class cricket for Cambridge University against Sussex at Fenner's in 1953. He made eight further appearances for Cambridge in 1953, scoring 218 runs at an average of 15.57, with a high score of 47. With right-arm fast-medium bowling he took 18 wickets at a bowling average of 37.55, with best figures of 5 for 35, which came against Worcestershire. He played his final two minor counties fixtures for Norfolk in 1954, as well as appearing in a first-class fixture for the Free Foresters against Cambridge University.

He married Lady Rose Amanda Bligh in September 1961, with the couple having two children. Upon the death of his father in October 1976, he succeeded him as the 5th Baronet. Hare died at King's Lynn in January 1993. Upon his death, he was succeeded as the 6th Baronet by his cousin, Philip.

Baronetage of the United Kingdom
Preceded by Sir Ralph Hare	Baronet (of Stow Hall); 1976–1993	Succeeded by Sir Philip Hare
