= James Rattee =

James Rattee (1820 – 29 March 1855) was an English woodcarver and mason, especially noted for his skill in church ornamentation and restoration, for which his services were sought worldwide.

== Life ==
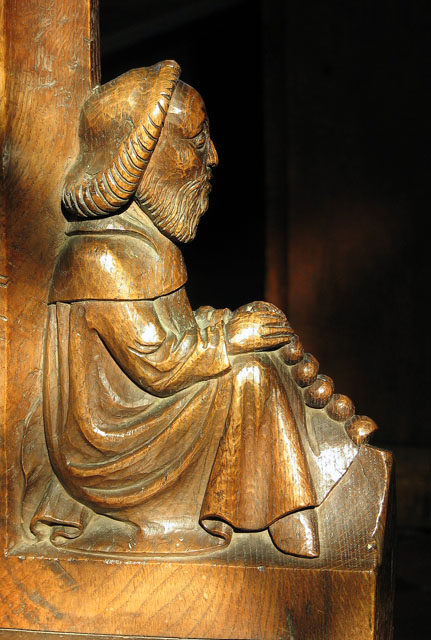
Church bench end in Wimbotsham by James Rattee.

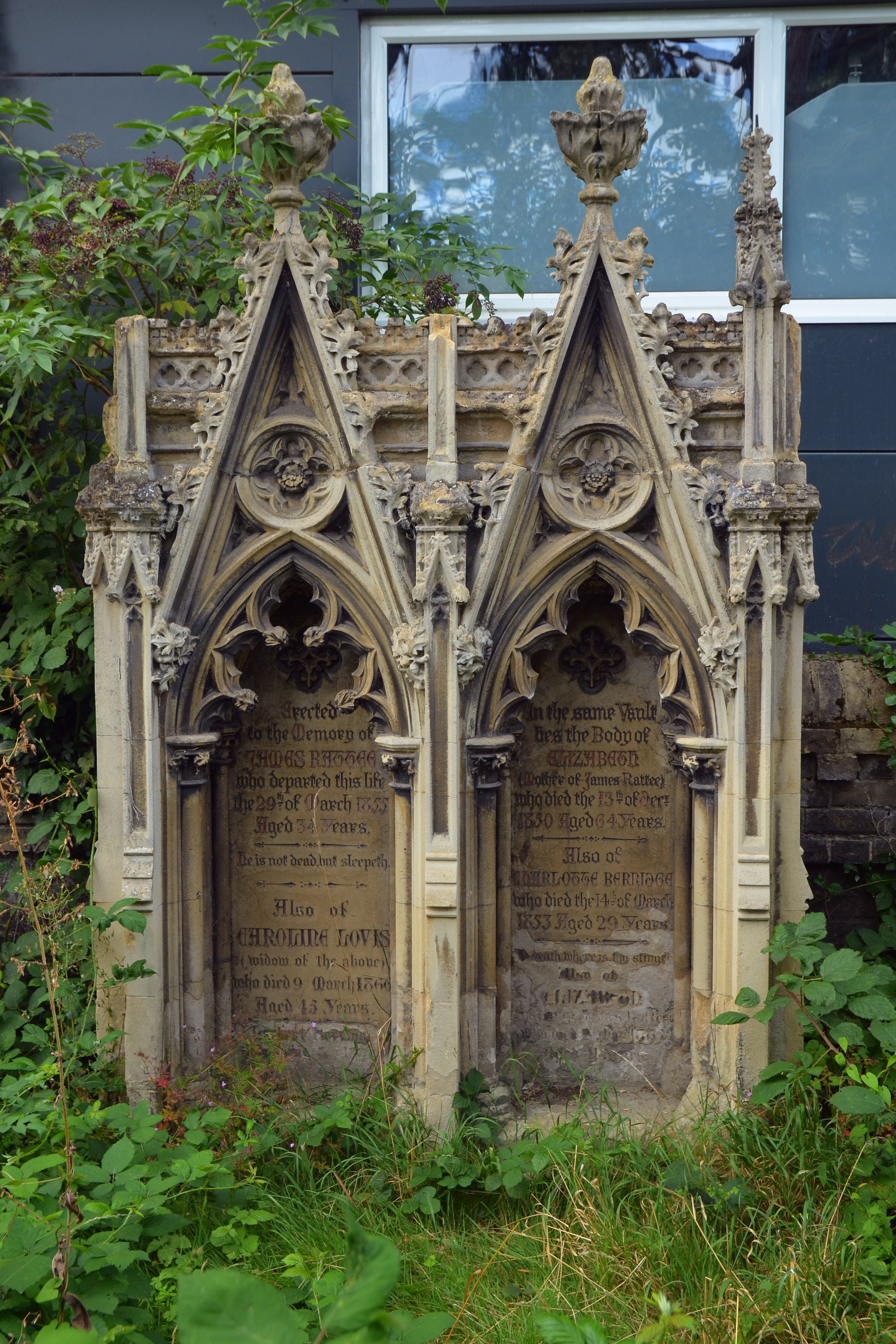
Tomb of James Rattee and his mother in Mill Road Cemetery, Cambridge.

Rattee was born at Fundenhall, Norfolk, in 1820, and apprenticed to a carpenter and joiner of Norwich, named Ollett. In his leisure he frequented the cathedral and other churches in the city and its neighbourhood, and grew interested in ecclesiastical art. At his request his master taught him carving, and he rapidly showed unusual skill and ability. In 1842 he left Norwich and commenced business as a wood-carver in Sidney Street, Cambridge. He founded a limited company in 1843 and was joined by George Kett to form Rattee and Kett in 1848. The Cambridge Camden Society soon discovered Rattee's talent, and took him into their service.

From Thomas Thorp, William Hodge Mill, F. A. Paley, and other members of the society, he received assistance and patronage. Rattee erected extensive workshops, plant, and steam power, on Hills Road, Cambridge.

He was associated with Augustus Welby Pugin in restoring the choir of Jesus College chapel; the designs were made principally by Rattee, and submitted to Pugin before execution. In the choir of Ely Cathedral he carried out the designs of George Gilbert Scott, and the oak screen, stalls, organ-case, and restored tomb of Bishop William de Luda or Louth (d. 1298) were exquisitely wrought.

In 1852, when he travelled abroad for his health, he studied the works of Quentin Matsys and other artists. On his return the dean and chapter of Ely entrusted him with the construction of the reredos. This was composed of choice stone and alabaster, enriched with carving and inlaid with gold and gems; it is one of the finest specimens of ecclesiastical art executed in England since the Reformation.

He died at his residence, Hills Road, Cambridge, on 29 March 1855, and was buried in Mill Road cemetery, Cambridge. His family tomb was Grade II listed in 1980.

== Work ==
Despite his early death, Rattee's work is found in upwards of a thousand churches in all quarters of the world. Further examples can be seen in the following:

- Newfoundland Cathedral
- Westminster Abbey
- St Ninian's Cathedral, Perth
- Merton College chapel, Oxford
- St Michael's Church and Holy Sepulchre, Cambridge (also known as the Round Church), Cambridge
- Eton College chapel
- Magdalene College chapel, Cambridge
- The churches of Trumpington, Newton, Westley Waterless and Comberton, in Cambridgeshire
- Yelling church, Huntingdonshire
- Sundridge church, Kent
