= Nicholas Hare =

English politician (died 1557)

Sir Nicholas Hare of Bruisyard, Suffolk (c. 1495 – 31 October 1557) was Speaker of the House of Commons of England between 1539 and 1540.

== Life ==
Hare was the eldest son of John Hare and Elizabeth Fortescue and was born about 1495. His father was from Homersfield, Suffolk. He was educated at Gonville and Caius College, Cambridge and admitted to the Inner Temple in 1515. He had three sisters, who were married to MPs, and a brother, John Hare of Stow Bardolph, Norfolk.

Hare was Member of Parliament (MP) for Downton, Wiltshire in 1529 and possibly Wiltshire in 1539 (when he was elected Speaker of the House of Commons), Lancaster in 1545 and Taunton in 1547. He was knighted in May 1539 and eventually became Master of the Rolls (1553–1557).

In 1554, Hare presided at the trial of Nicholas Throckmorton, who had been accused of involvement in Wyatt's rebellion against the marriage of Queen Mary to Philip II of Spain of Spain.

Hare died on 31 October 1557 and was buried in Temple Church, commemorated in the south bay window of the new Inner Temple Hall.

== Family ==
Hare married Katherine, daughter of John Bassingbourne of Woodhall near Hatfield, Hertfordshire.

Hare had three sons. One son was Robert Hare, the antiquary.

Political offices
Preceded by Sir Richard Rich	Speaker of the House of Commons; 1539-1540	Succeeded by Sir Thomas Moyle
