= Barroway Drove =

Village in the parish of Stow Bardolph in Norfolk, England

Coordinates: 52.60°N 00.30°E

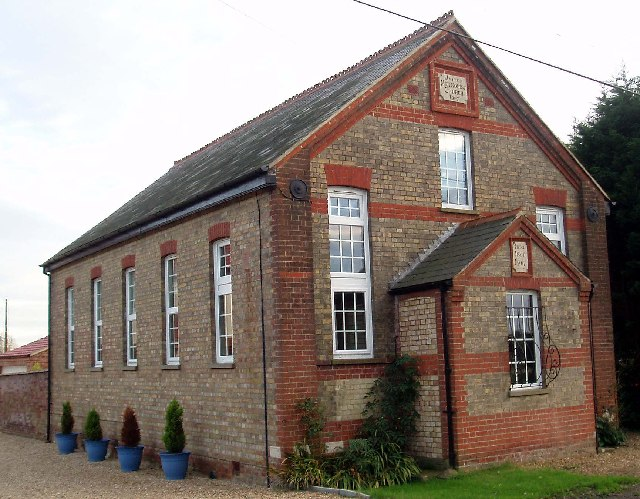
- The former United Methodist Church, Barroway Drove

- Location within Norfolk
- Population: 126
- OS grid reference: TF5603
- Shire county: Norfolk
- Region: East
- Country: England
- Sovereign state: United Kingdom
- Police: Norfolk
- Fire: Norfolk
- Ambulance: East of England

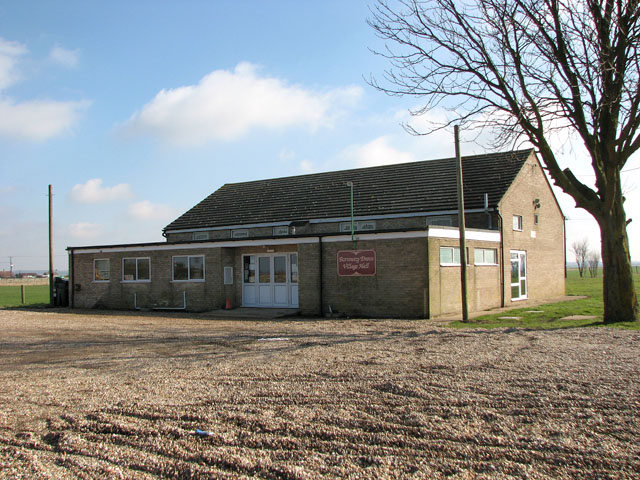
Barroway Drove village hall

Barroway Drove is a village in the parish of Stow Bardolph in Norfolk, England. For the purposes of local government, it falls within the district of King's Lynn and West Norfolk. Barroway Drove was referred to as Bardolph Fen.

The village lies on the eastern edge of The Fens. It has a village hall. In 2007, Stephen Fry filmed a number of scenes for his television series Kingdom in the village.
