= Wiggenhall St Mary Magdalen =

Village in Norfolk, England

Coordinates: 52.674925°N 0.360317°E

Wiggenhall St Mary Magdalen: South Wiggenhall
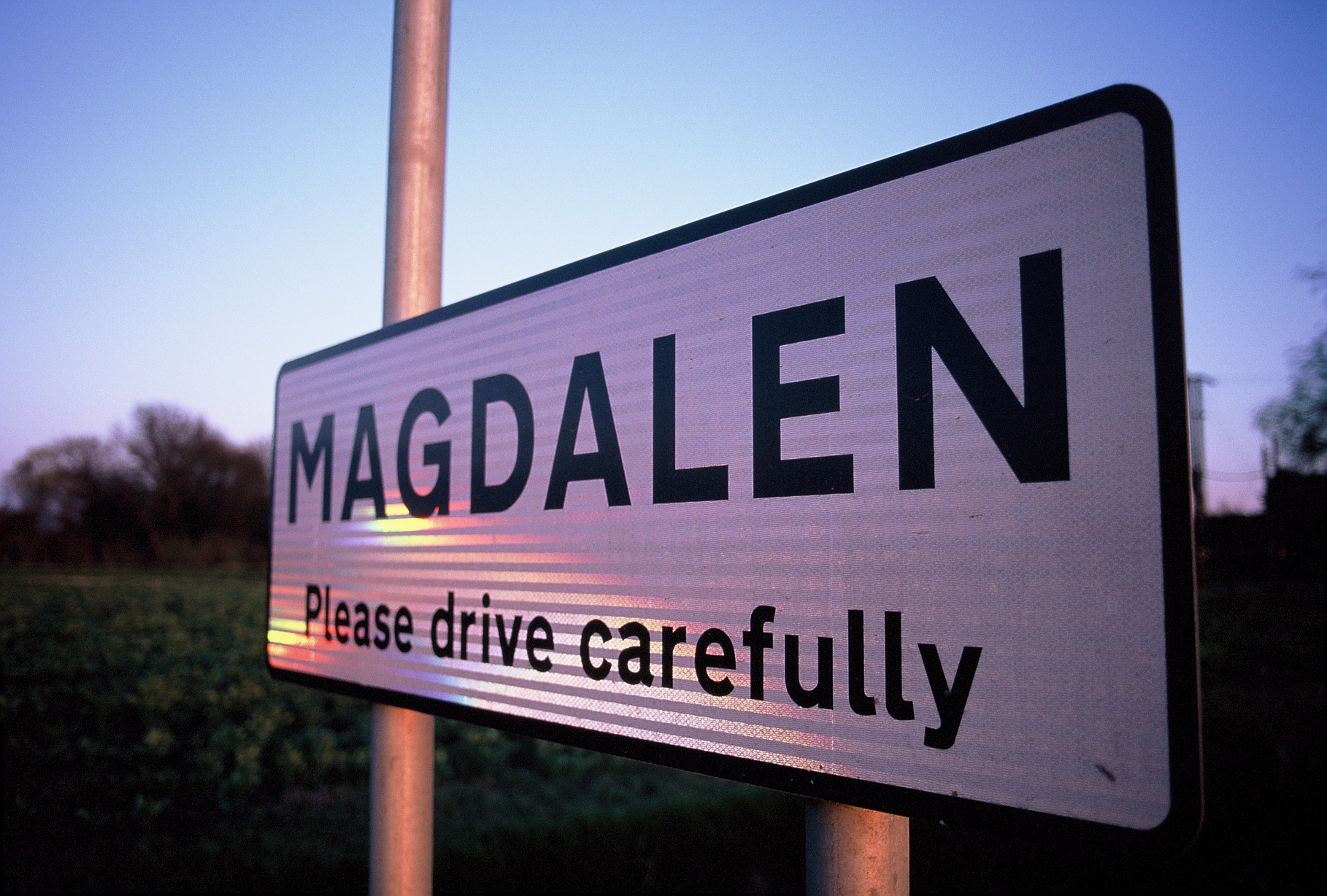

- Location within Norfolk
- Area: 17.76 km^{2} (6.86 sq mi)
- Population: 729 (2011)
  - Density: 41/km^{2} (110/sq mi)
- OS grid reference: TF591104
  - London: 132 km (82 mi) WbS
- Civil parish: Wiggenhall St Mary Magdalen
- District: West Norfolk
- Shire county: Norfolk
- Region: East
- Country: England
- Sovereign state: United Kingdom
- Post town: King's Lynn
- Postcode district: PE34
- Dialling code: 01553
- Police: Norfolk
- Fire: Norfolk
- Ambulance: East of England
- UK Parliament: South West Norfolk
- Website: Wiggenhall St Mary Magdalen Parish Council

Wiggenhall St Mary Magdalen is a civil parish and village in the English county of Norfolk. It is 6 miles (9.7 km) south of the town of King's Lynn on the west bank of the River Great Ouse. It covers an area of 17.76 km^{2} (6.86 sq mi) and had a population of 729 in 304 households in the 2011 census. For the purposes of local government, it falls within the district of King's Lynn and West Norfolk.

The village's name means "Wicga's nook of land".

In the Domesday Book of 1085, it appears that the parish and Wiggenhall St Germans were at that time a single parish named Wiggenhall, of modest size and sharing half a water mill on the old Wiggenhall Eau (the watercourse which ran through the parish before the Great Ouse arrived in the 13th century) with Runcton Holme.

The earliest evidence of settlement is therefore the parish church of St Mary Magdalen, which is situated in the very northeastern corner of the parish. Most of the early settlement appears to have occurred here, probably due to the presence of a levee along the western side of the River Great Ouse, made of silts deposited by a former watercourse, the Wiggenhall Eau.

The church itself is largely Perpendicular in style, but the tower may date from as early as the 13th century, which is corroborated by the entry in the Register of Crabhouse Priory which tells of the nuns taking refuge at the church from a flood in the early 13th century. Today the church is almost entirely red brick, with a façade that is the result of a thorough 15th-century rebuilding.

The parish contains two centres of population: around the parish church in the north, and to the south of Crabhouse Priory in the far south, now known as Stowbridge, which also extends into neighbouring parishes.

John Howard, 1st Duke of Norfolk, Earl Marshal (c.1425 – 22 August 1485) was the grandson of Sir John Howard of Wiggenhall.

A tidal bore travels up the Great Ouse which is the area's most significant topographical feature.

Magdalen Gate railway station was the name of the station on the Great Eastern Railway.

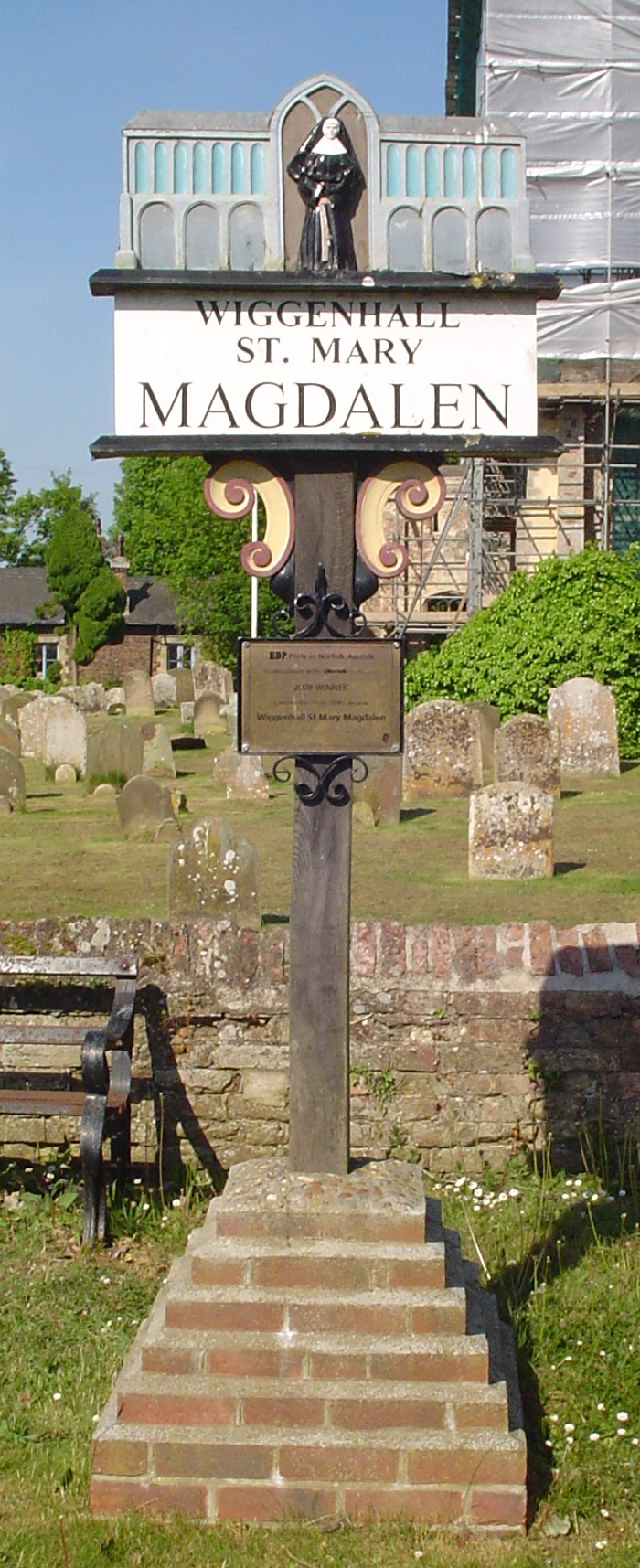
Signpost in Wiggenhall St Mary Magdalen

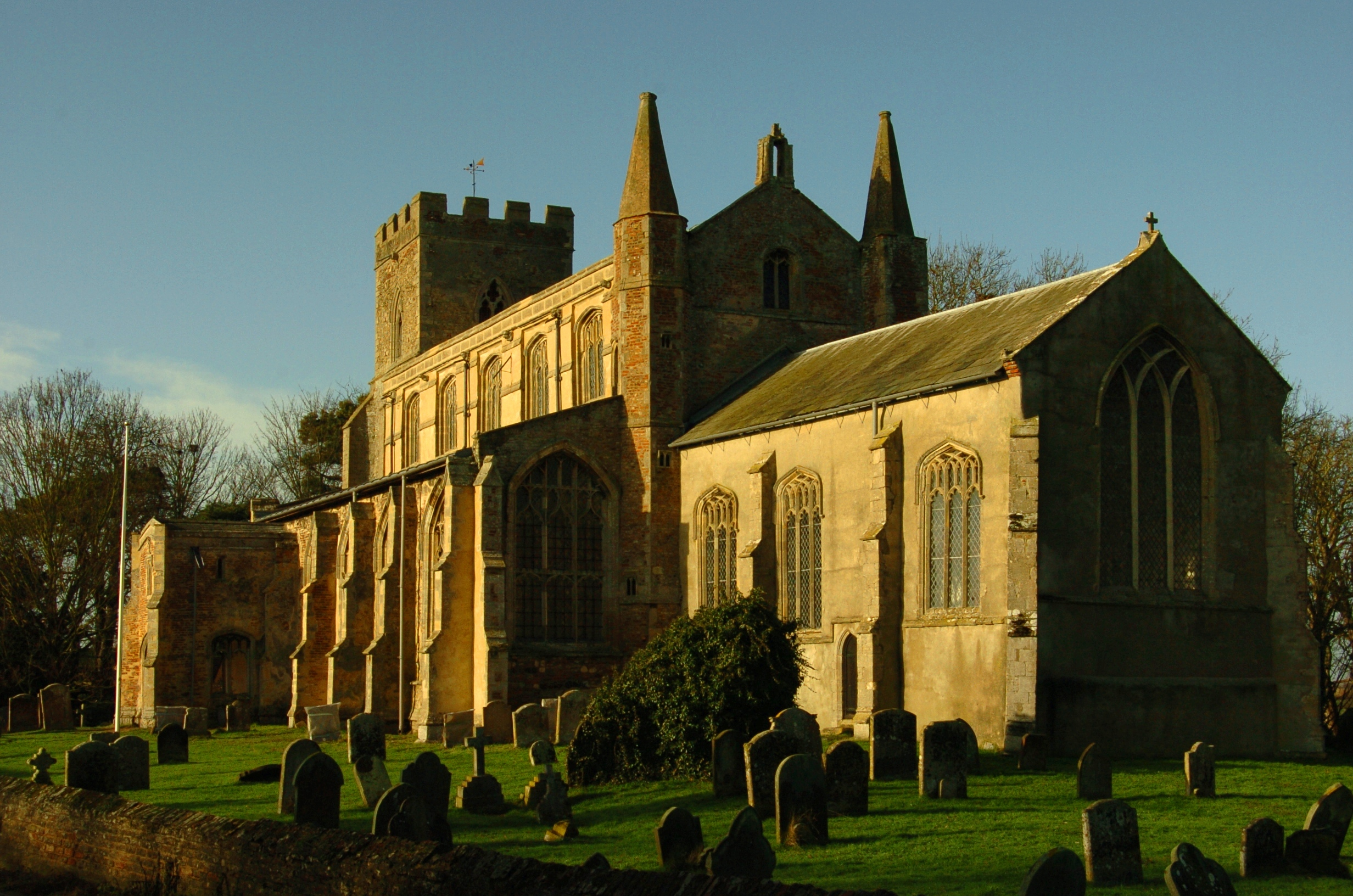
Exterior of St Mary Magdalene Church

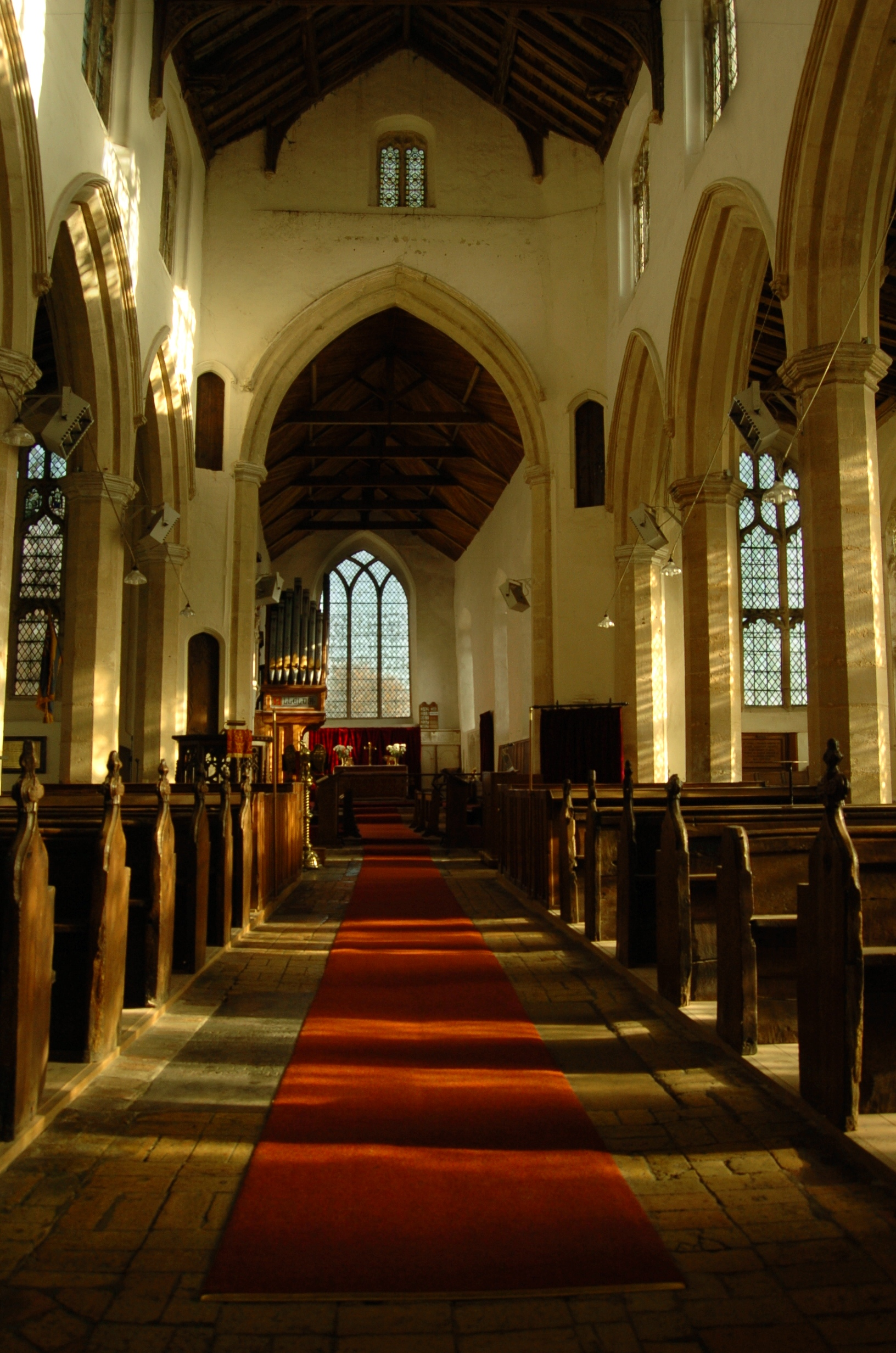
Inside of St Mary Magdalene Church

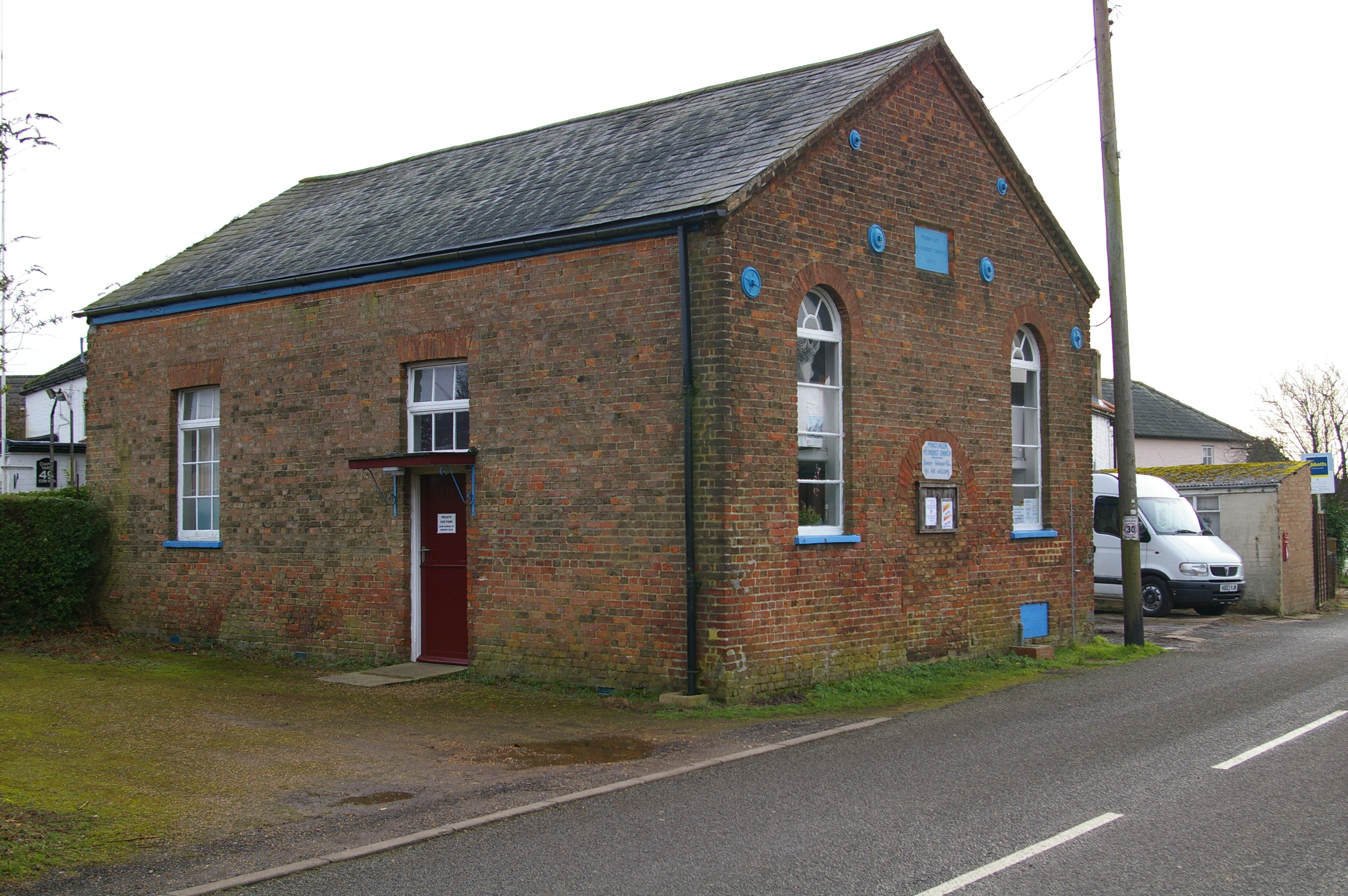
Magdalen Methodist Church

== Notable residents ==
- Arthur Randell (1901–1988), railwayman, molecatcher and author.

== See also ==
- Wiggenhall St Germans
