= Stow Bardolph =

Civil parish in Norfolk, England

Coordinates: 52.62555°N 0.40378°E

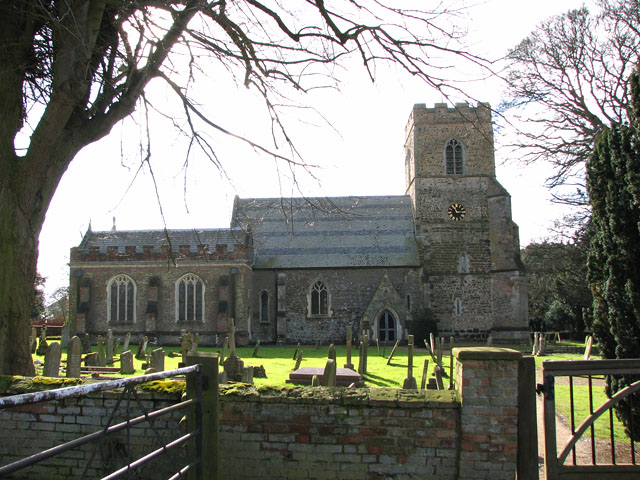
- Holy Trinity church

- Location within Norfolk
- Area: 24.68 km^{2} (9.53 sq mi)
- Population: 1,230 (2011 Census)
  - Density: 50/km^{2} (130/sq mi)
- OS grid reference: TF628058
- Civil parish: Stow Bardolph
- District: King's Lynn and West Norfolk
- Shire county: Norfolk
- Region: East
- Country: England
- Sovereign state: United Kingdom
- Post town: KING'S LYNN
- Postcode district: PE34
- Dialling code: 01366
- Police: Norfolk
- Fire: Norfolk
- Ambulance: East of England

Stow Bardolph, sometimes simply referred to as Stow, is an estate and civil parish in the English county of Norfolk, lying between King's Lynn and Downham Market on the A10.

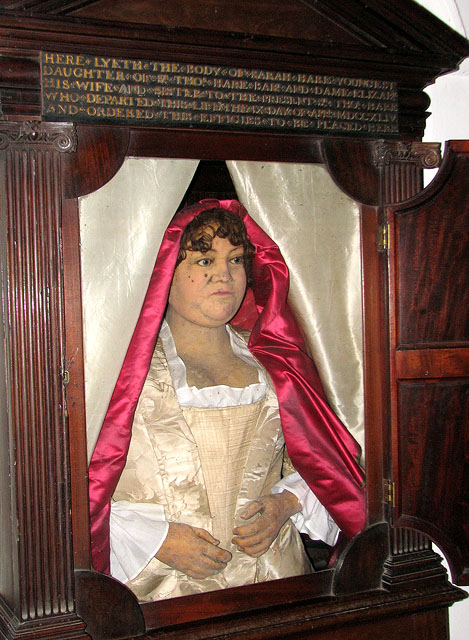
The wax effigy of Sarah Hare who died in 1744

It covers an area of 6,100 acres (2,500 ha) and had a population of 1,014 in 421 households at the 2001 census, the population increasing to 1,230 at the 2011 census. For the purposes of local government, it falls within the district of King's Lynn and West Norfolk. The parish includes Stowbridge and Barroway Drove.

== History ==
The village name evolved from the Old English stōw - place; a place of assembly; a holy place - to which was added the surname Bardolf. This was almost certainly because of connections with the Lords Bardolf of nearby Wormegay Castle.

The Stow Bardolph estate was purchased by the Hare family in 1553. At least three Stow Halls have existed on the estate, the original was built around 1589 by Nicholas Hare, Master of the Rolls and Lord Keeper of the Great Seal, but fell into disrepair and was demolished. The second Stow Hall was built around 1796, but this too fell into disrepair and was demolished. The third Stow Hall was built around 1874 and served as a stately home until 1939. From 1940 to 1980 the house was used by the local health authority as a maternity hospital and was demolished in 1994 when it was found to be beyond economic repair.

Holy Trinity Parish Church was extensively restored by John Raphael Rodrigues Brandon around 1850. A wax effigy of the upper body of Sarah Hare, including lifelike face and hands, is displayed upright in a mahogany case in the Hare Chapel of the church. She died from blood poisoning in 1744 at the age of 55 and her will stated she wished to be recreated in wax following her death. It is the only funerary effigy of its kind outside Westminster Abbey. The church also has a stained glass window to the memory of Victoria Cross recipient James Adams who was vicar here from 1896 to 1902.

The village is home to a Rare Breeds Centre, at Church Farm, which opened in 2004.

The Golden Noble apple was discovered as a chance seedling by Patrick Flanagan, head gardener for Sir Thomas Hare of Stow Bardolph Hall. He presented it in 1820 to the Horticultural Society of London.

== Education ==
The old rectory serves as a preparatory school and Montessori nursery which opened in 1984. The rectory was previously a maternity home.

== Sport and leisure ==
The estate is home to the Stow Cricket Club and Croquet Club which were both re-reformed in 1991.

== Notable residents ==
- Nicholas Hare (1484–1557), Speaker of the House of Commons 1539–1540
- Hare baronets, created in the Baronetage of England on 23 July 1641
- George Henry Dashwood (1801–1869), historian, curate, then vicar 1852–1869
- James Adams VC (1839–1903), vicar 1896–1902
