= Hare baronets =

Set index for Hare baronets

There have been three baronetcies created for persons with the surname Hare, one in the Baronetage of England and two in the Baronetage of the United Kingdom. One creation is extant as of 2026.

- Hare baronets of Stow Bardolph (1641)
- Hare baronets of Stow Hall (1818)
- Hare baronets of Stow Hall (1905): see Sir Thomas Leigh Hare, 1st Baronet (1859–1941)
