= Professional wrestling =

Form of athletic theater

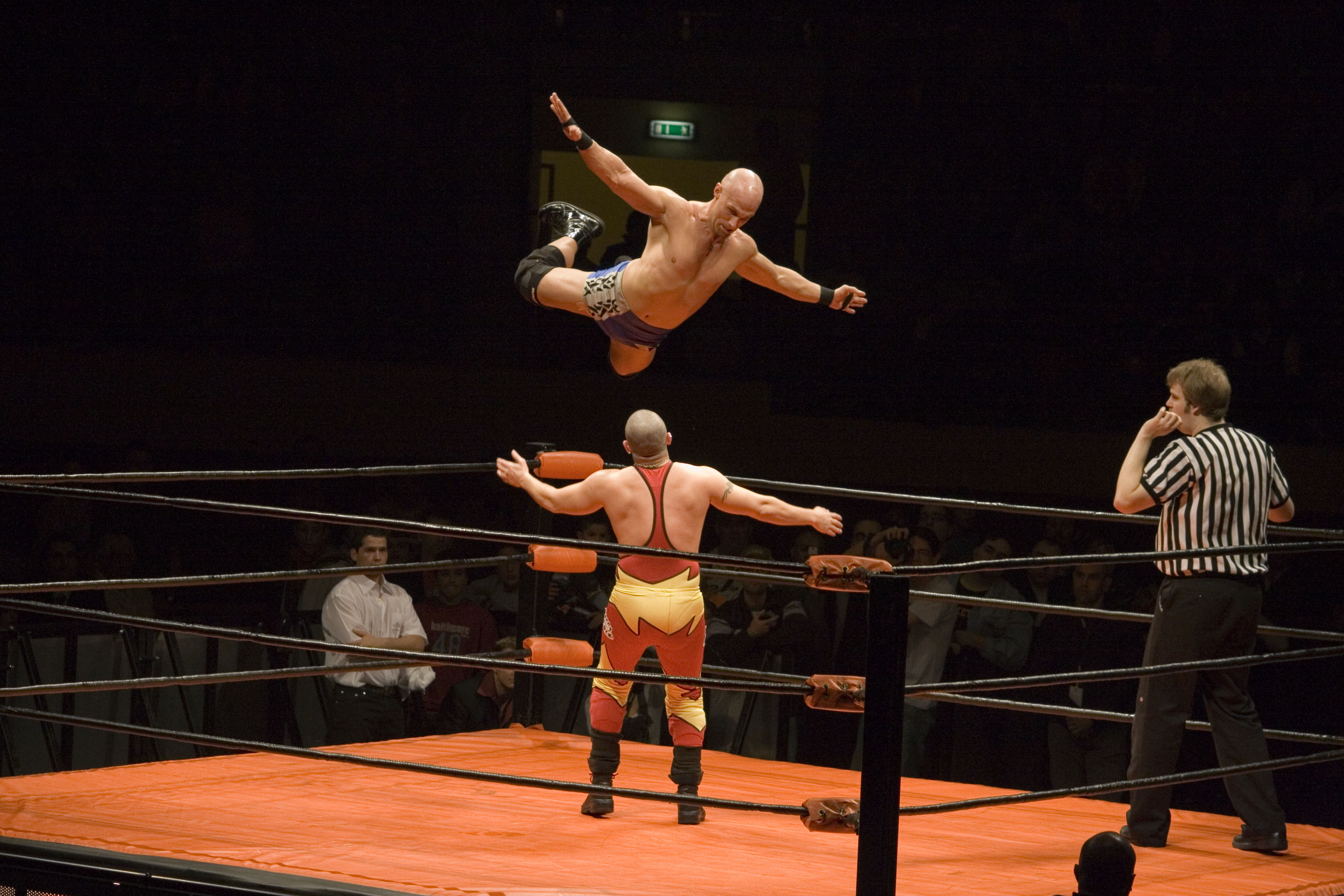
Christopher Daniels performing a flying crossbody on Jonny Storm; like all wrestling moves, this requires coordination between both wrestlers in order to ensure each other's safety.

Professional wrestling, often referred to as pro wrestling or simply wrestling, is a form of athletic theater centered around mock combat, with the premise that its performers are competitive wrestlers. The legitimate sport of wrestling has never been popular enough in the United States to sustain a professional scene because the action is considered too slow-paced. In the late 19th century, wrestlers dealt with this by quietly fixing their matches so that they could display more entertaining action. Through improvisation and choreography, they could perform more spectacular moves that rarely (if ever) occurred in a real wrestling match, and thus managed to draw sustainable audiences.

Match fixing in sports was frowned upon then as much as it is now, so the wrestlers kept the practice a secret. Wrestling promoters scripted victories for their more charismatic wrestlers to please the fans. Since charisma mattered more than skill to a wrestler's success, wrestlers adopted personae and gimmicks to make themselves more entertaining. As promotions grew more sophisticated, they started writing dramatic stories for their wrestlers, pitting heroic "faces" against villainous "heels". Professional wrestlers were required to remain in character whenever they were in public, a practice known as "kayfabe". This requirement was relaxed in the 1990s as by then fans had not only become fully aware of the fakery, but had come to accept it. Despite a series of high-profile exposés, professional wrestling retained enough fans to remain viable.

Professional wrestling is performed around the world through various promotions, which are roughly analogous to production companies or sports leagues. Promotions vary considerably in size, scope, and creative approach, ranging from local shows on the independent circuit to internationally broadcast events at major arenas. The largest and most influential professional wrestling promotions are in the United States, Mexico, Japan, and Europe (particularly the United Kingdom, France, and Germany/Austria), which have each developed distinct styles, traditions, and subgenres within professional wrestling. Many professional wrestlers also perform as freelancers and make appearances for different promotions.

Professional wrestling has developed a distinct culture and community, including its own glossary of terms. It has had a significant influence on popular culture, with wrestling phrases, tropes, and concepts appearing in everyday language and in film, television, music, and video games. Numerous professional wrestlers have achieved national or international recognition, with some gaining further prominence through careers in acting, music, and politics.

== Context ==
In the United States, wrestling is generally practiced in an amateur context. There is no professional league for competitive wrestling in most Western countries, mainly due to a lack of popularity.

In numerous American states, professional wrestling is legally defined as a non-sport. For instance, the New York Athletic Commission defines professional wrestling thus:

Professional wrestling means an activity in which participants struggle hand-in-hand primarily for the purpose of providing entertainment to spectators and which does not comprise a bona fide athletic contest or competition. Professional wrestling is not a combative sport. Wrestling constituting bona fide athletic contests and competitions, which may be professional or amateur combative sport, shall not be deemed professional wrestling under this Part. Professional wrestling as used in this Part shall not depend on whether the individual wrestlers are paid or have been paid for their performance in a professional wrestling exhibition. All engagements of professional wrestling shall be referred to as exhibitions, and not as matches.

— 19 CRR-NY 213.2(b) [emphasis in original]

The state of Washington instead refers to professional wrestling as "theatrical wrestling".

In other countries such as India and Mongolia, legitimate wrestling enjoys widespread popularity, and the phrase "professional wrestling" thus carries a more literal meaning in those places. A notable example is India's Pro Wrestling League, which governs competitive wrestling.

In the industry's slang, a fixed match is referred to as a worked match, derived from the slang word for manipulation, as in "working the crowd". A shoot match is a genuine contest where both wrestlers fight to win and are therefore "straight shooters", which comes from a carnival term for a shooting gallery gun whose sights were not deliberately misaligned. A fan who believes professional wrestling matches are real sport is referred to as a mark, whereas a fan who sees through the facade is a smart.

Many people have the misconception that wrestlers belong to the actors' committee, while they do not and are in fact independent contractors.

== History in the United States ==
=== Wrestling in early America ===
Wrestling in early America was typically a localized affair. Wrestlers would fight opponents from the same town or nearby towns within walking distance. Wrestlers sometimes competed for money but the winnings were usually small, not enough to live on. Because the winnings were small and the wrestlers were usually from the same community, the wrestling styles they practiced emphasized subduing opponents without inflicting injury, allowing the wrestlers to go back to their regular jobs the next day and avoid making enemies. The most common styles of wrestling during the early 19th century were Greco-Roman, collar-and-elbow, and catch-as-catch-can.

=== Transition to theater ===
Spectator sports grew increasingly popular in late 19th-century America due to rising income levels, urbanization, railroads, mass transit, and mass media. Before this time, sports were mostly a hobby, but now a star athlete could make a living touring the country and playing before large paying crowds. Wrestlers who attempted professional careers faced a problem: most spectators found wrestling boring. The wrestlers spent a lot of time on the mat grappling each other or locked in unchanging positions. Matches could drag on for hours if the wrestlers were evenly matched. Matches were typically decided when a wrestler placed his opponent in a submission hold. A submission hold is impossible to break and typically easy to establish if the opponent's defense is lax. In wrestling, the most successful attacks are often counterattacks, where a wrestler takes advantage of his opponent's aggression to create openings for his own offense. This motivated the wrestlers to fight defensively, which resulted in matches with little activity. This was in contrast to boxing, whose rules encouraged more dynamic and aggressive play.

To solve this problem, wrestlers experimented with different styles and rules, but eventually they settled on quietly staging their matches (or "working" them, as they say in the industry). Through choreography and improvisation, the wrestlers could perform more spectacular moves and stunts. A wrestler might allow his opponent to perform a spectacular throw on him and put him in a hold, and seconds later his opponent would allow him to make a spectacular escape. The action flowed at a pace that pleased the audience. Fixed matches could also be kept short, which audiences preferred. Short matches were also easier to schedule and allowed wrestlers to perform more frequently. Audiences hated above all matches that ended in a draw, but fixed matches always produced a winner. The "winner" had to be agreed upon in advance by the wrestlers. This was not unique to America. Spectators in the United Kingdom also found legitimate wrestling too boring, and British professional wrestlers likewise were forced to "work" their bouts.

They wrestled in the Graeco-Roman style, which permits holds only above the waist, and can be intolerably slow when two well-matched men meet. ... I found this was generally the case where straight matches were concerned; whereas when a good exhibition wrestler would allow his opponent to slip away, and get out of dangerous-looking holds, with extraordinary head-spins and all sorts of monkey tricks which were nothing more or less than showmanship, the audience would go mad with excitement.

— Charles Blake Cochran, a British wrestling promoter, in his 1925 memoir

A second benefit of fixed matches was to reduce the risk of injury. Competitive wrestling matches, particularly the ones where large quantities of money were wagered, often ended with sprains or broken bones. A serious injury could prematurely end the career of a wrestler. Furthermore, around the start of the 20th century, the American public was increasingly disgusted by excessive violence in sports, which had led to bans on boxing in various parts of the country. In a fixed match, the wrestlers had no need to be so brutal. Unlike punches in boxing, wrestling holds can be faked convincingly without inflicting injury. Shorter matches also suited aging wrestlers who no longer had the stamina for a long fight. It allowed wrestlers to perform more frequently. In later decades, audience tastes shifted and professional wrestling became more brutal, but in those early years, there was a strong desire to minimize injury.

A major influence on professional wrestling was carnival culture. Some wrestlers in the late 19th century worked in carnival shows. For a fee, a visitor could challenge the wrestler to a quick match. If the challenger defeated the champion in a short time frame, usually 15 minutes, they won a prize. To encourage challenges, the carnival operators staged matches in which an accomplice posing as a visitor challenged the champion and won, giving the audience the impression that the champion was easy to beat. This practice taught wrestlers the art of staging matches and fostered a mentality that spectators were marks to be duped. The term kayfabe comes from carny slang. By the start of the 20th century, nearly all professional wrestling matches were fixed, and the press had caught on.

American wrestlers are notorious for the amount of faking they do. It is because of this fact that suspicion attaches to so many bouts that the game is not popular here. Nine out of ten bouts, it has been said, are pre-arranged affairs, and it would be no surprise if the ratio of fixed matches to honest ones was really so high.

— The National Police Gazette, July 22, 1905

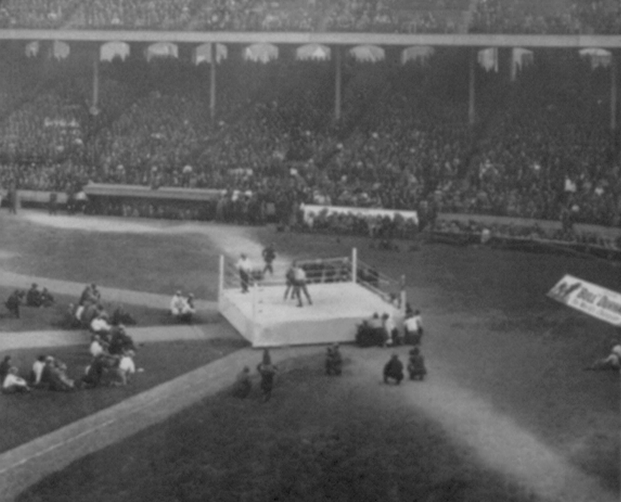
Wrestling match between Frank Gotch vs Georg Hackenschmidt for the World Heavyweight Wrestling Championship in Chicago, 1911.

In the 1910s, promotion cartels for professional wrestling emerged in the East Coast, outside its traditional heartland in the Midwest. These promoters made long-term plans with their wrestlers, and ensured their more charismatic and crowd-pleasing wrestlers received championships. This meant further suppression of legitimate matches, which by this point were largely limited to challenges by independent wrestlers. A wrestler could claim that the rules of their promotion did not allow them to fight independent challengers. In other cases promoters would respond to such challenges by requiring the challenger to first defeat a "policeman": a powerful wrestler employed not for their star power but their ability to defeat, and often seriously injure, outside challengers. As the promotions grew, there were fewer independent wrestlers to make such challenges anyway.

The cartels suppressed double-crosses. A double-cross was when a wrestler broke his promise to throw a match and instead fought to win. At times a promoter had to award a victorious double-crosser the title of champion to preserve the facade of competition. However, promoters punished such wrestlers by blacklisting them, making it quite challenging for these troublemakers to find work. Double-crossers could also be sued for breach of contract, as Dick Shikat was in 1936. According to Lou Thesz, what few legitimate matches happened back in the 1930s tended to be either double-crosses or done to settle business disputes between rival wrestling groups.

In April 1930, the New York State Athletic Commission decreed that all professional wrestling matches held in the state had to be advertised as "shows", not "matches", unless certified as contests by the commission. This requirement did not apply to amateur wrestling, which the commission had no authority over. The former wrestler William Muldoon was the chairman of the commission when this decree was made. On rare occasions, the commission did certify some matches, such as for a championship match between Jim Londos and Jim Browning in June 1934. The Seattle Athletic Commission passed a similar rule in April 1931 for professional wrestlers in Seattle. The rule imposed by the New York commission didn't hurt professional wrestling's popularity. On the contrary, it seems to have helped the industry because the following year, boxing promoters in New York asked the commission to impose the same rule on boxing matches. Since wrestlers in New York no longer had to worry about legal repercussions for match fixing, they were free to perform more absurd antics in the ring for the amusement of the crowds. Boxing promoters, who were reeling from numerous match-fixing scandals of their own, wanted to copy the wrestling business model.

Despite the growing awareness that fixed matches were widespread, professional wrestlers did not publicly admit that it had become standard. The public preferred the staged matches but wanted to believe they were legitimate. Some people placed bets on the outcomes, and spectators would boo if they thought a match was faked.

If we put on a match that is on the level, it is often dull and tiresome and the crowd doesn't like it. So we have to fake most of our bouts to get by. And then the fake gets out in some way and the crowd still hollers. ... You're wrong any way you try it.

— Anonymous wrestler confiding to a journalist in 1931

In 1933, wrestling promoter Jack Pfefer divulged the inner workings of the industry with the New York Daily Mirror, maintaining no pretense that wrestling was legitimate and sharing planned results just before the matches took place. He exposed the truth to undermine his rival wrestling promoters when they excluded him from their cartels. Pfefer and a number of promoters including Jack Curley and Toots Mondt were questioned by the New York State Athletic Commission on 9 January 1934. Despite being under oath, the others fiercely denied Pfefer's allegations. Pfefer's promotion subsequently saw a decline in attendance, but so did those of his rivals, and all spectator sports suffered during the Great Depression (1929–1939), so it is uncertain to what extent his indiscretion cost him; however, his business did not collapse. In fact, Pfefer outlasted most of his rivals from the 1930s. Pfefer adapted by leaning in to the theatricality. He promoted "freakishly" ugly wrestlers such as The French Angel, wrote crazier storylines, and popularized novelties such as tag-teams, midget wrestlers, and women wrestlers. He wanted the public to appreciate professional wrestling as an art form, not a sport. But the other promoters chose to double down on kayfabe. The damage Pfefer's exposure had done to their business strengthened their belief in the need for it.

Newspapers refused to cover professional wrestling as if it were a sport, so promoters resorted to publishing their own magazines in order to attain press coverage and communicate with fans. The first professional wrestling magazine, Wrestling As You Like It, printed its first issue in 1946. These magazines were faithful to kayfabe.

In the 1980s, Vince McMahon began discretely lobbying various state governments to recognize professional wrestling as a non-sport so that his promotion, the World Wrestling Federation (WWF), could be exempted from sports licensing fees and health-and-safety oversight. In 1985, McMahon rebranded the World Wrestling Federation as a "sports entertainment" company. In 1985, he testified in a lawsuit that professional wrestling is rigged.

In 1989, McMahon testified before the New Jersey State legislature that professional wrestling is not a legitimate sport and therefore should be exempted from sports regulations and taxes. McMahon's testimonies were exposed in The New York Times and the New York Post. This was not the first time a promoter admitted in court that professional wrestling is all theater, but Vince McMahon controlled more than half of the industry in America by 1989, and The New York Times was one of the most important newspapers in the country if not the world. Consequently, the revelation caused irreversible damage to the facade of professional wrestling. McMahon had only wanted to avoid taxes, not do away with kayfabe, and for a few years he kept punishing his wrestlers for violating it. In May 1996, during an untelevised wrestling match at Madison Square Garden, which was the final performances of Kevin Nash and Scott Hall for the WWF, the wrestlers all climbed into the ring and embraced each other, faces and heels together, to the confusion of the audience. Although McMahon fined each of these transgressors $2,500, the incident further eroded kayfabe, and McMahon decided there was no going back. He was willing to reveal some truths to the public, but on his own terms. McMahon began incorporating actual backstage politics into WWF storylines using a new dramatic conceit called the "worked shoot", which was a performance that appeared to be wrestlers breaking character backstage but in fact was scripted.

=== Evolution in the television age ===
Professional wrestling's fanbase had traditionally largely consisted of children, the elderly, blue-collar workers, and ethnic minorities. The rise of television in the 1950s brought unprecedented national exposure to a broader audience, as networks were short on content. Professional wrestling enjoyed a period of mainstream popularity that was buoyed by the visual spectacles and showmanship of performers such as Gorgeous George and Buddy Rogers.

Beginning in the 1960s, networks increasingly shifted to more mainstream interests such as baseball, and professional wrestling was dropped from primetime slots, if not altogether; the core audience then shrank back to a profile similar to that of the 1930s. Nevertheless, this period saw some a brief boost in ratings and signs of strength; the American Wrestling Association's (AWA), which had emerged as an independent promotion in 1960, was setting new standards in how professional wrestling was presented on television, while the National Wrestling Alliance (NWA) maintained a strong following in the South. By the 1970s, professional wrestling entered a more pronounced and sustained decline that persisted into the 1980s.

=== Development of stylistic conventions ===
In the early 20th century, the style of wrestling that was mimicked in professional wrestling matches was catch wrestling. Promoters at the time wanted their matches to look realistic and so preferred to recruit wrestlers with real grappling skills. In his memoir, Lou Thesz recalled that when he started wrestling as a boy in the 1920s, only people trained in legitimate wrestling could see that professional wrestling matches were staged. In the 1920s, a group of wrestlers and promoters known as the Gold Dust Trio introduced moves that have since become staples of the mock combat of professional wrestling, such as body slams, suplexes, punches, finishing moves, and out-of-ring count-outs.

By the early 1930s, most wrestlers had adopted personas to generate public interest. These personas could broadly be characterized as either faces (heroes) or heels (villains). Native Americans, cowboys, and English aristocrats were staple characters in the 1930s and 1940s. Some wrestlers played different personas depending on the region they were performing in; with the rise of television and thus national exposure, most wrestlers maintained a single persona and narrative. Wrestlers also often used some sort of gimmick, such as a finishing move, eccentric mannerisms, or out-of-control behavior (in the case of heels). The matches could also have gimmicks, such as wrestlers fighting in mud or piles of tomatoes. The most successful and enduring gimmick to emerge from the 1930s were tag-team matches. Promoters noticed that matches slowed down as the wrestlers in the ring tired, so they gave them partners to relieve them. It also gave heels another way to misbehave by double-teaming.

Towards the end of the 1930s, faced with declining revenues, promoters chose to focus on grooming charismatic wrestlers with no regard for their skill as they believed it was charisma that drew the crowds, and wrestlers who were both skilled and charming were very rare. After this time, matches became more theatrical and any semblance professional wrestling had to legitimate wrestling styles faded. The personas of the wrestlers likewise grew more outlandish. Gorgeous George, who performed throughout the 1940s and 1950s, was the first wrestler whose entrance into the arena was accompanied by a theme song played over the arena's loudspeakers, his being Pomp and Circumstance. He also wore a costume—a robe and hairnet, which he removed after getting in the ring—and had a pre-match ritual where his "butler" would spray the ring with perfume. In the 1980s, Vince McMahon made entrance songs, costumes, and rituals standard for his star wrestlers; for instance, McMahon's top star, Hulk Hogan, would entertain the audience by tearing his shirt off before each match.

=== Evolution of regional cartels ===
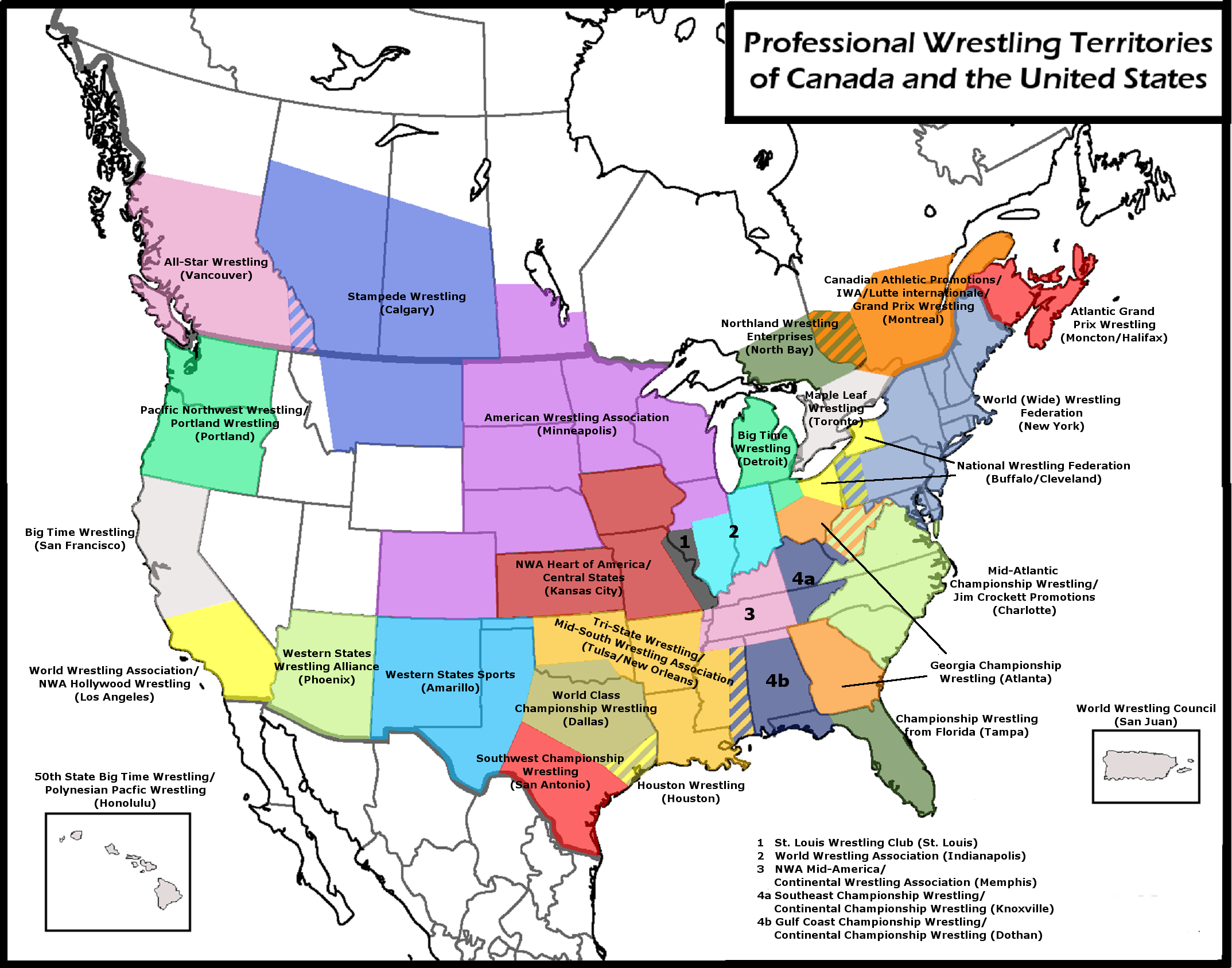
The National Wrestling Alliance territories

The first major promoter cartel emerged on the East Coast, although up to that point, wrestling's heartland had been in the Midwest. Notable members of this cartel included Jack Curley, Lou Daro, Paul Bowser, and Tom and Tony Packs. The promoters colluded to solve a number of problems that hurt their profits. Firstly, they could force their wrestlers to perform for less money. As the cartel grew, there were fewer independent promoters where independent wrestlers could find work, and many were forced to sign a contract with the cartel to receive steady work. The contracts forbade them from performing at independent venues. A wrestler who refused to play by the cartel's rules was barred from performing at its venues. A second goal of the wrestling cartels was to establish an authority to decide who was the "world champion". Before the cartels, there were multiple wrestlers in the U.S. simultaneously calling themselves the "world champion", and this sapped public enthusiasm for professional wrestling. Likewise, the cartel could agree on a common set of match rules that the fans could keep track of. The issue over who got to be the champion and who controlled said champion was a major point of contention among the members of wrestling cartels as the champion drew big crowds wherever he performed, and this would occasionally lead to schisms. By 1925, this cartel had divided the country up into territories which were the exclusive domains of specific promoters. This system of territories endured until Vince McMahon drove the fragmented cartels out of the market in the 1980s. This cartel fractured in 1929 after one of its members, Paul Bowser, bribed Ed "Strangler" Lewis to lose his championship in a match against Gus Sonnenberg in January 1929.

Bowser then broke away to form his own cartel, the Boston-based American Wrestling Association, in September 1930, declaring Sonnenberg as AWA World Heavyweight Championship. Curley reacted to this move by convincing the National Boxing Association to form the National Wrestling Association, which in turn crowned a champion that Curley put forth: Dick Shikat. In 1948, several promoters from across the country came together to form the National Wrestling Alliance (NWA); Bowser's AWA would join the following year. The NWA recognized one "world champion", voted on by its members, but allowed member promoters to crown their own local champions in their territories. If a member poached wrestlers from another member, or held matches in another member's territory, they risked being ejected from the NWA, at which point his territory became fair game for everyone. The NWA would blacklist wrestlers who worked for independent promoters or who publicly criticized an NWA promoter or who did not throw a match on command. If an independent promoter tried to establish himself in a certain area, the NWA would send their star performers to perform for the local NWA promoter to draw the customers away from the independent.

By 1956, the NWA controlled 38 promotions in the United States and several more in Canada, Mexico, Australia and New Zealand. The NWA's monopolistic practices became so stifling that independent promotions appealed to the government for help. In October 1956 the U.S. Attorney General's office filed an antitrust lawsuit against the NWA in an Iowa federal district court. The NWA settled with the government: It pledged to stop allocating exclusive territories to its promoters, to stop blacklisting wrestlers who worked for outsider promoters, and to admit any promoter into the Alliance. The NWA would flout many of these promises, but its power was nonetheless weakened by the lawsuit. In 1957, just one year after settlement, the AWA withdrew from the Alliance and renamed itself the Atlantic Athletic Corporation (AAC); the AAC shut down in 1960. In 1958, Omaha promoter and NWA member Joe Dusek recognized Verne Gagne as the world champion without the approval of the NWA. Gagne asked for a match against the recognized NWA champion Pat O'Connor. The NWA refused to honor the request, so Gagne and Minneapolis promoter Wally Karbo established the American Wrestling Association in 1960. This AWA should not be confused with Paul Bowser's AWA, which ceased operations just two months prior. Gagne's AWA operated out of Minnesota. Unlike the NWA, which only allowed faces to be champions, Gagne occasionally allowed heels to win the AWA championship so that they could serve as foils for him.

=== Consolidation and renewed growth ===
In August 1983, the World Wrestling Federation (WWF), a promotion in the northeast, withdrew from the NWA; Vince McMahon then took over as its boss. No longer bound by the territorial pact of the NWA, McMahon began expanding his promotion into the territories of his former NWA peers, now his rivals. By the end of the 1980s, the WWF would become the sole national wrestling promotion in the US. This was in part made possible by the rapid spread of cable television in the 1980s. The national broadcast networks generally regarded professional wrestling as too niche an interest, and had not broadcast any national wrestling shows since the 1950s. The widespread success of the WWF led to the 1980s professional wrestling boom, turning the sport consciously mainstream in society.

Before cable TV, a typical American household only received four national channels by antenna, and ten to twelve local channels via UHF broadcasting. Cable television could carry a much larger selection of channels and therefore had room for niche interests. The WWF started with a show called All-American Wrestling on the USA Network in September 1983. McMahon's TV shows made his wrestlers national celebrities, so when he held matches in a new city, attendance was high because there was a waiting fanbase cultivated in advance by the cable TV shows. The NWA attempted to centralize and create their own national cable television shows to counter McMahon's rogue promotion, but it failed in part because the members of the NWA, protective of their territories, did not wish to be beholden to a central authority. They also did not wish to leave the NWA to compete directly with McMahon, for that would mean their territories would compete against other NWA members. McMahon also had a creative flair for TV that his rivals lacked. For instance, the AWA's TV productions during the 1980s were amateurish, low-budget, and out-of-touch with contemporary culture, which lead to the promotion's closing in 1991.

In the spring of 1984, the WWF purchased Georgia Championship Wrestling (GCW), which had been ailing for some time due to financial mismanagement and internal squabbles. In the deal, the WWF acquired the GCW's timeslot on TBS. McMahon agreed to keep showing Georgia wrestling matches in that timeslot, but he was unable to get his staff to Atlanta every Saturday to fulfill this obligation, so McMahon sold GCW and its TBS timeslot to Jim Crockett Promotions (JCP). JCP started informally calling itself World Championship Wrestling (WCW). In 1988, Ted Turner bought JCP and formally renamed it World Championship Wrestling. Professional wrestling experienced a second boom in the late 1990s. During this period, WCW became a credible rival to the WWF (see also Monday Night War), while the WWF's output, coinciding with the rise of "trash TV", became increasingly crude. By the turn of the century, WCW suffered from a series of creative missteps that led to its failure and purchase by the WWF. One of the company's mistakes was the diminished glamor of the WCW World Heavyweight Championship. Between January 2000 and March 2001, the WCW title changed hands eighteen times, which sapped fan enthusiasm, particularly for the climactic pay-per-view matches.

== Industry conventions ==
Professional wrestling performances are governed primarily by a script and overarching storyline devised by producers, who often are professional wrestlers themselves. Real-life events, such as a performer's contract status and legitimate injuries, may be incorporated into storylines, and some wrestlers integrate elements of their genuine personalities or background into their performances or personas; for example, Kurt Angle, who performed his fictional persona eponymously, often utilized his genuine Olympic gold medal in wrestling as a defining aspect of his character. The actions of the character in shows are considered fictional and wholly separate from the life of the performer, although some performers will remain in character outside the ring, such as in promotional videos, interviews, and even social media; consequently, the line between real-life and scripted events and personas are often blurred. For example, Maxwell Jacob Friedman (MJF) is well known for staying in character at all times while in public, going so far as to insult his fans, often to their delight as they are aware of his persona.

=== Kayfabe ===
Kayfabe is the term given to the fictional element of professional wrestling. Wrestlers would at all times flatly deny allegations that they fixed their matches, and they often remained in-character in public even when not performing. When in public, wrestlers would sometimes say "kayfabe" to each other as a coded signal that there were fans present for whom they needed to be in character. Professional wrestlers in the past strongly believed that if they admitted the truth, their audiences would desert them; accordingly, promotions have often disciplined or punished performers for breaking kayfabe.

Today's performers don't "protect" the industry like we did, but that's primarily because they've already exposed it by relying on silly or downright ludicrous characters and gimmicks to gain popularity with the fans. It was different in my day, when our product was presented as an authentic, competitive sport. We protected it because we believed it would collapse if we ever so much as implied publicly that it was something other than what it appeared to be. I'm not sure now the fear was ever justified given the fact that the industry is still in existence today, but the point is no one questioned the need then. "Protecting the business" in the face of criticism and skepticism was the first and most important rule a pro wrestler learned. No matter how aggressive or informed the questioner, you never admitted the industry was anything but a competitive sport.

— Lou Thesz, Hooker

The first wrestling promoter to publicly admit to routinely fixing matches was Jack Pfefer. In 1933, he started talking about the industry's inner workings to the New York Daily Mirror, resulting in a huge exposé. The exposé neither surprised nor alienated most wrestling fans, although some promoters like Jack Curley were furious and tried to restore the facade of kayfabe as best as they could. In 1989, Vince McMahon testified before the New Jersey government that professional wrestling was not a true sport and therefore should be exempted from sports-related taxes. Many wrestlers and fans resented McMahon for this, but Lou Thesz accepted it as the smart move as it gave the industry more freedom to do as it pleased, and because by that point professional wrestling no longer attempted to appear real. The demise of WCW in 2001 provided some evidence that kayfabe still mattered to a degree. Vince Russo, the boss of WCW in 2000, completely disregarded kayfabe by routinely discussing business matters and office politics in public, which alienated fans.

=== Sports entertainment ===
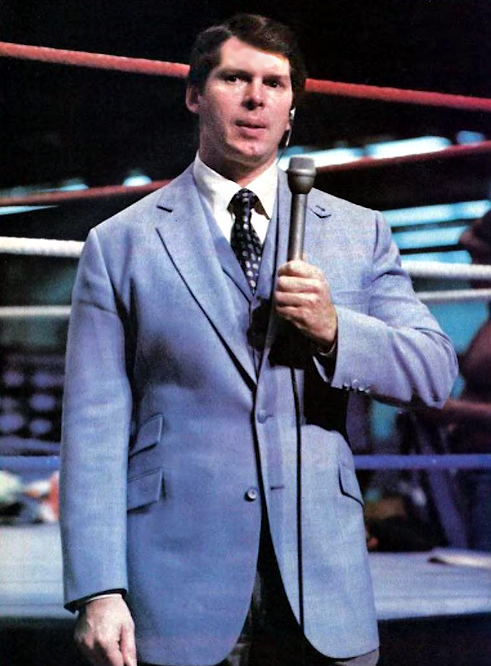
Vince McMahon as a commentator, c. 1986

The wrestling industry convention of kayfabe has increasingly been challenged by the modern concept of sports entertainment, which openly acknowledges professional wrestling's predetermined nature and celebrates its roots in both competitive sport and dramatic theater. The term "sports entertainment" was coined by World Wrestling Federation chairman Vince McMahon during the 1980s as a marketing term to describe the professional wrestling industry, primarily to potential advertisers; however, precursors date back to at least February 1935, when Toronto Star sports editor Lou Marsh described professional wrestling as "sportive entertainment". In 1989, the WWF used the phrase in a case before the New Jersey Senate to classify professional wrestling as "sports entertainment" and thus not subject to regulation like a directly competitive sport.

In subsequent years, WWE insisted that its talent use "sports entertainment" rather than "pro wrestling" to describe its business, to the point that the term was sometimes used in other promotions to generate "heat" (fan reaction and engagement). The line between sports entertainment and competitive sports was further blurred in 2023, when WWE merged (as TKO Group Holdings) with the parent company of Ultimate Fighting Championship (UFC), a genuinely competitive mixed martial arts promotion, in what was officially announced as an effort to "bring together two leading pureplay sports and entertainment companies" and provide "significant operating synergies" between them. The following year, WWE moved away from its insistence on being a sports entertainment company after Vince McMahon's departure from the company, but still uses "sports entertainment" in some contexts.

Whether professional wrestling is a genuine sport often reflects a broader debate as to the nature and qualities of a sport categorically. Some commentators and analysts identify baseline commonalities between professional wrestling and other sports, such as performance entailing "physical activity governed by a set of rules of customs" and there still being competition among pro wrestlers with respect to their performances.

Just because there's a script involved it doesn't take away from the competitive environment of professional wrestling. Ask any former wrestler, read an autobiography on a wrestler or use common sense. There is tremendous competition within the WWE. Not performing to the high standards in the ring? "You're Fired". Not getting over with the fans? "You're Fired." Being a nuisance and refusing to be a team player? "You're fired." Don't want to continually train, live the grueling road schedule and establish connections...see where I'm going with all this? While NFL, NBA, NHL, MLB and overseas soccer players (football, I know, I apologize) are getting paid ridiculous contracts (with a lump sum up front, and a lot of the contract guaranteed), professional wrestlers do much more work for a lot less. We can safely take the competition argument out of the discussion. So ultimately, if you can look past the script, then professional wrestling is a sport.

— William Gullo, Bleacher Report (September 6, 2011)

Others retort that while professional wrestling is comparable in its physical and athletic requirements—including "shared values of resilience and excellence" and similar risks of bodily injury—its scripted nature preempts one of the purported defining characteristics of a sport: genuine competition over the outcome. The ambiguity of professional wrestling as a form of sports entertainment is further heightened by news media, which often cover professional wrestling matches and events as if they were genuine sports; for example, in 2024, Forbes ranked professional wrestling promotions WWE and All Elite Wrestling (AEW) among the world's "most valuable combat sports promotions" alongside bona fide competitive sport organizations UFC, ONE Championship, and Matchroom Boxing.

=== Performance aspects ===
I watch championship wrestling from Florida with wrestling commentator Gordon Solie. Is this all "fake"? If so, they deserve an Oscar.

— S. R. Welborn of High Point, North Carolina, question posed to sports Q&A column written by Murray Olderman, 1975

Professional wrestling shows can be considered a form of theater in the round, with the ring, ringside area, and entryway comprising a stage. There is less of a fourth wall than in most theatric performances; like pantomime, audience involvement is expected and encouraged. Attendees are recognized and acknowledged by performers as spectators to the sporting event being portrayed and are encouraged to interact as such; their reactions can dictate how the performance unfolds, leading to a high level of audience participation. Often, individual matches will be part of a longer storyline conflict between "babyfaces" (often shortened to just "faces") and "heels". "Faces" (the "good guys") are those whose actions are intended to encourage the audience to cheer, while "heels" (the "bad guys") act to draw the spectators' ire.

In pro wrestling matches, performers often execute a series of pre-planned moves and attacks, ranging from grappling and throws found in some traditional forms of wrestling, to more spectacular stunts, sometimes involving props and special effects. Although match outcomes and narratives are predetermined, wrestlers are expected to improvise and weave elements of their character. Attacks are designed to appear dramatic while reducing the risk of serious injury as much as possible; the overall aim is to minimize the actual injurious impact of their moves while maximizing their entertainment value. Shows produced by the largest professional wrestling promotions like WWE are traditionally performed in indoor venues, while flagship events like WrestleMania are sometimes taking place at outdoor venues; these shows are generally video recorded for live or delayed broadcasting. Additionally filmed footage known as "segments" or "promos" are usually used to accompany the drama in these shows.

Prior experience in legitimate wrestling is not a requirement for aspiring professional wrestlers but is seen as an advantageous background. Despite its scripted format, several notable performers have had prior experience in legitimate wrestling before transitioning to its theatrical form. A popular performer, Kurt Angle, is the first Olympic gold medalist in professional wrestling history, having won his gold medal at the 1996 Summer Olympic Games in freestyle wrestling. Another prominent performer is Brock Lesnar, a former NCAA wrestler who won the NCAA Division I Wrestling Championships in 2000.

== Rules and other dramatic elements ==
Professional wrestlers nominally compete under rules promulgated by wrestling promotions. However, the rules are not legitimate standards for sporting activity, instead serving as a basis to advance plotlines, similar to the artificial constraints imposed in other fictional universes. Sociologist Thomas S. Henricks has argued the rules serve as a basis for a structuralist moral order, serving to advance plot lines involving charismatic heroes applying an instrumentally rationalist approach to social conflicts. Professional wrestlers do not follow an industry-standard set of rules, unlike most sporting events, which generally have a governing body to regulate competitions. While each promoter can set their own standards, promoters have long understood that fans enjoy professional wrestling more when all matches appear to follow a consistent set of rules. The rules described in this section represent common standards but may not precisely align with the ruleset of any specific promotion.

=== Structure of performances ===
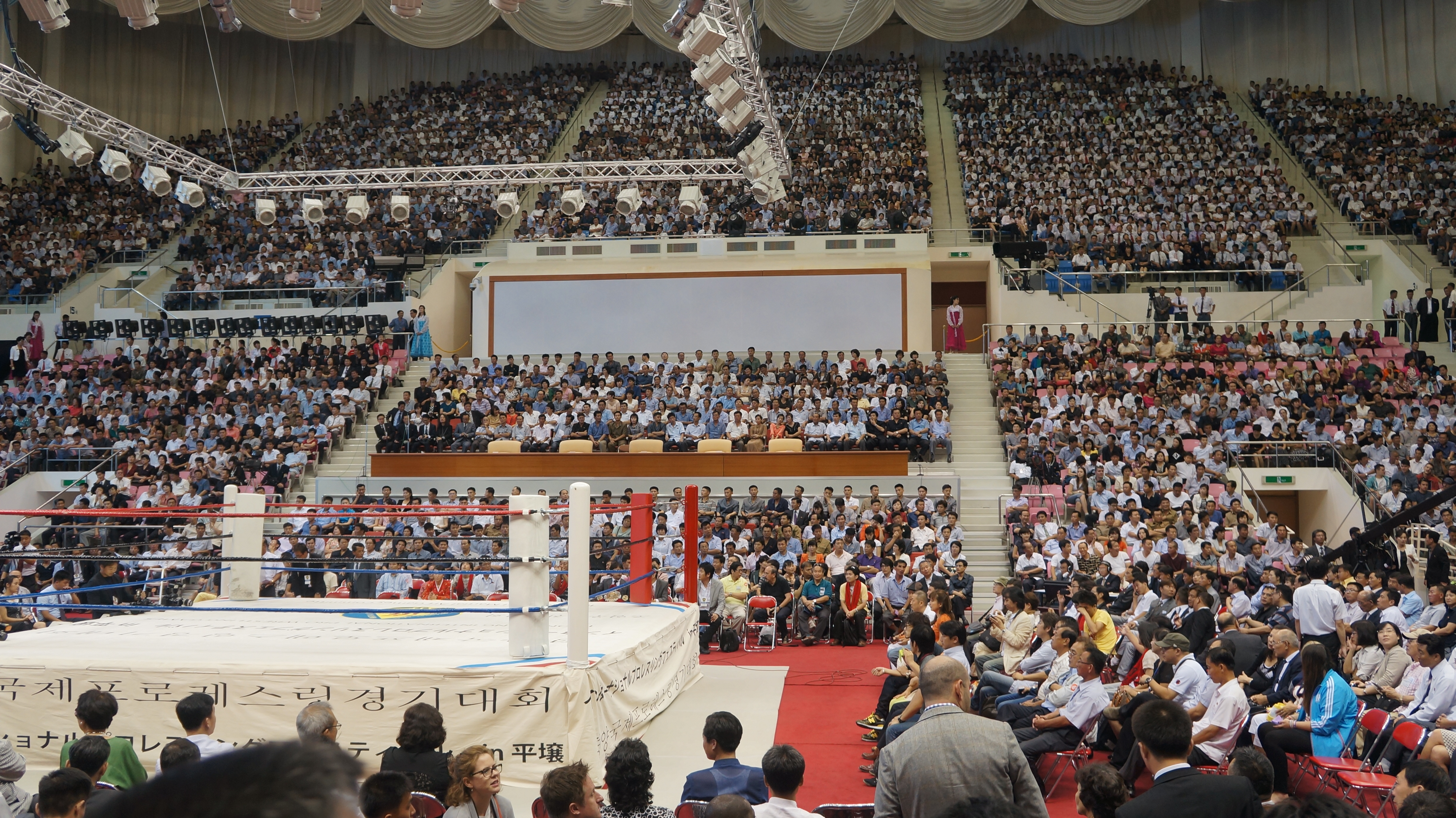
Spectators gather in Pyongyang, North Korea for Antonio Inoki's Pro Wrestling Friendship Games. A traditional wrestling ring can be seen in the lower left corner.

Matches are staged between two or more sides ("corners"). Each corner may consist of one wrestler, or a team of two or more. Most team matches are nominally governed by tag team rules. Other matches present under the premise of a free-for-alls, with multiple combatants but no teams. In all variants, there can be only one winning team or wrestler, however it may be possible for all participants to lose. Matches generally take place within a wrestling ring, an elevated square canvas mat with posts on each corner. A cloth apron hangs over the edges of the ring. Three horizontal ropes or cables surround the ring, suspended with turnbuckles which are connected to the posts. For safety, the ropes are padded at the turnbuckles and cushioned mats surround the floor outside the ring. Guardrails or a similar barrier enclose this area from the audience. Wrestlers are generally expected to stay within the confines of the ring, although matches sometimes end up moving outside the ring, and even into the audience. The standard method of scoring is the "fall", which, is premised as being accomplished by:

- Pinning the opponent's shoulders to the mat, typically for three seconds (although other times have been used)
- Forcing the opponent to submit
- Disqualification of the opponent
- The opponent remaining outside the ring for too long (countout)
- Knocking out or otherwise incapacitating the opponent

These are each explained in greater detail below. Pinfalls and submissions must occur within the ring unless stipulated otherwise. Most wrestling matches last for a set number of falls, with the first side to achieve the majority number of pinfalls, submissions, or countouts being the kayfabe winner. Historically, the matches went to 3 falls ("best 2 out of 3") or 5 falls ("best 3 out of 5"). For modern wrestling, the genre convention is 1 fall. These matches have a time limit; if not enough falls are scored by the end of the time limit, the match is presented as draw. Modern matches are generally given a 10- to 30-minute time limit for standard matches; title matches can go for up to one hour. British wrestling matches held under Admiral-Lord Mountevans rules (and similar systems across Europe) consist of a series of rounds – typically six rounds each lasting three minutes or until a fall or submission is scored, with a thirty-second break between each round and can either be two-out-of-three falls, one fall to a finish (mostly for low-priority warmup matches) or the wrestler with the most falls wins at the end of the final round.

An alternative subgenre involves is a match set for a prescribed length of time, with a running tally of falls. The entrant with the most falls at the end of the time limit is declared the winner. This is usually for 20, 30 or 60 minutes, and is commonly called an Iron Man match. This type of match can be modified so that fewer types of falls are allowed. In performances staged with multiple competitors, an elimination system may be used. Any wrestler who has a fall scored against them is forced out of the match, and the match continues until only one remains. It is much more common when more than two wrestlers are involved to simply go one fall, with the one scoring the fall, regardless of who they scored it against, being the winner. In championship matches, this means that, unlike one-on-one matches (where the champion can simply disqualify himself or get himself counted out to retain the title via the Champion's Advantage), the champion does not have to be pinned or involved in the decision to lose the championship. Heel champions often find advantages, not in Champion's Advantage, but in the use of weapons and outside interference, as these poly-sided matches tend to involve no holds barred rules.

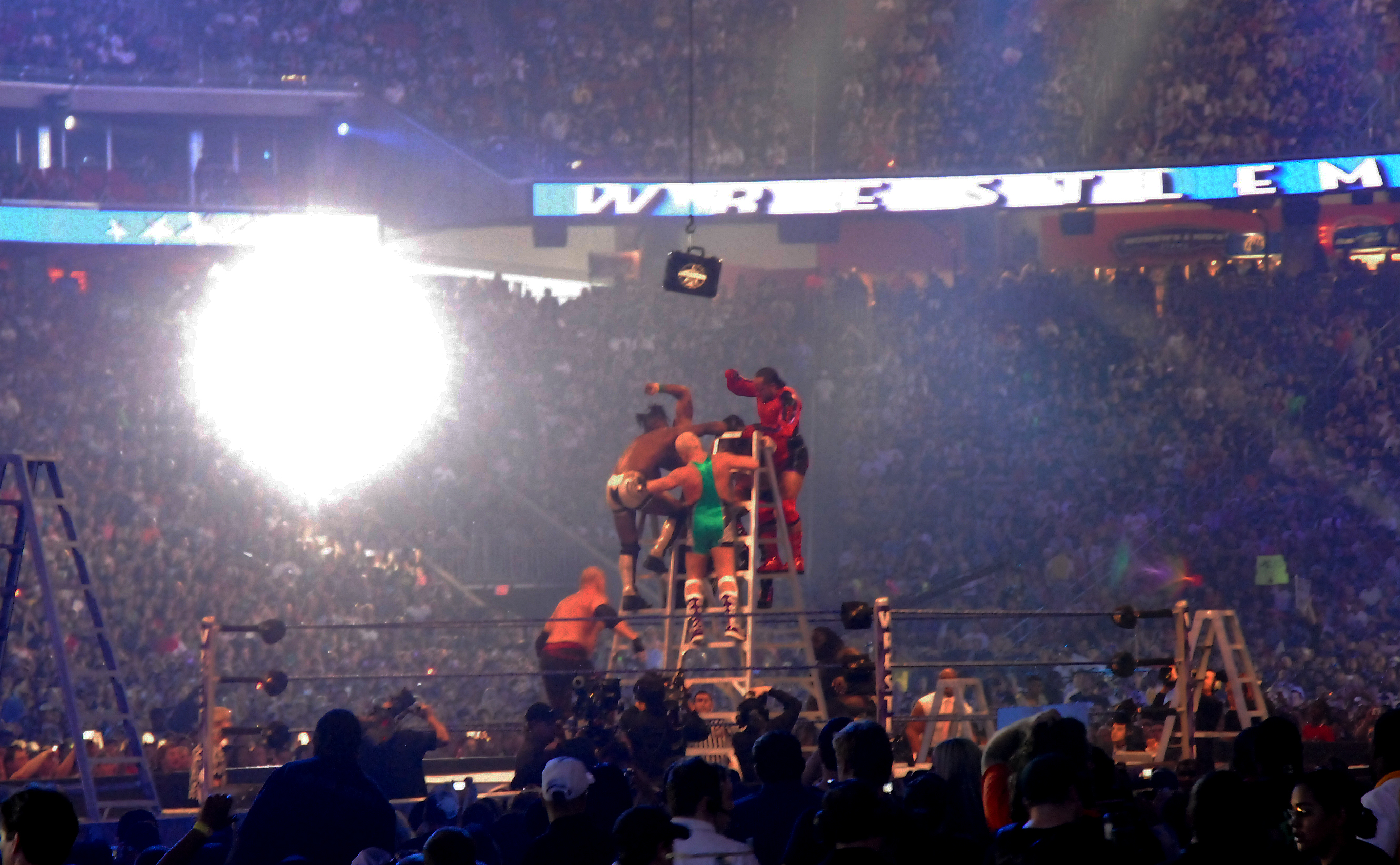
A WWE Money in the Bank ladder match in 2009

Some wrestling performances are staged with unique winning conditions, often to allow a thing theoristic plot construction. An example is the ladder match. In the basic ladder match, the premise is wrestlers or teams of wrestlers must climb a ladder to obtain a prize that is hoist above the ring. The key to winning this match is that the wrestler or team of wrestlers must try to incapacitate each other long enough for one wrestler to climb the ladder and secure that prize for their team. As a result, the ladder can be used as a weapon. The prizes include, but are not limited to, any given championship belt (the traditional prize), a document granting the winner the right to a future title shot, or any document that matters to the wrestlers involved in the match (such as one granting the winner a cash prize). Something that is also common in pro wrestling is the cage match which comes with the added rule that victory can be achieved by escaping the cage. Another common specialty match is known as the battle royal. In a battle royal, all the wrestlers enter the ring to the point that there are 20–30 wrestlers in the ring at one time. When the match begins, the simple objective is to throw the opponent over the top rope and out of the ring with both feet on the floor to eliminate that opponent. The last wrestler standing is declared the winner. A variant on this type of match is the WWE's Royal Rumble where two wrestlers enter the ring to start the match and other wrestlers follow in 90 second intervals (previously 2 minutes) until 30–40 wrestlers have entered the ring. All other rules stay the same.

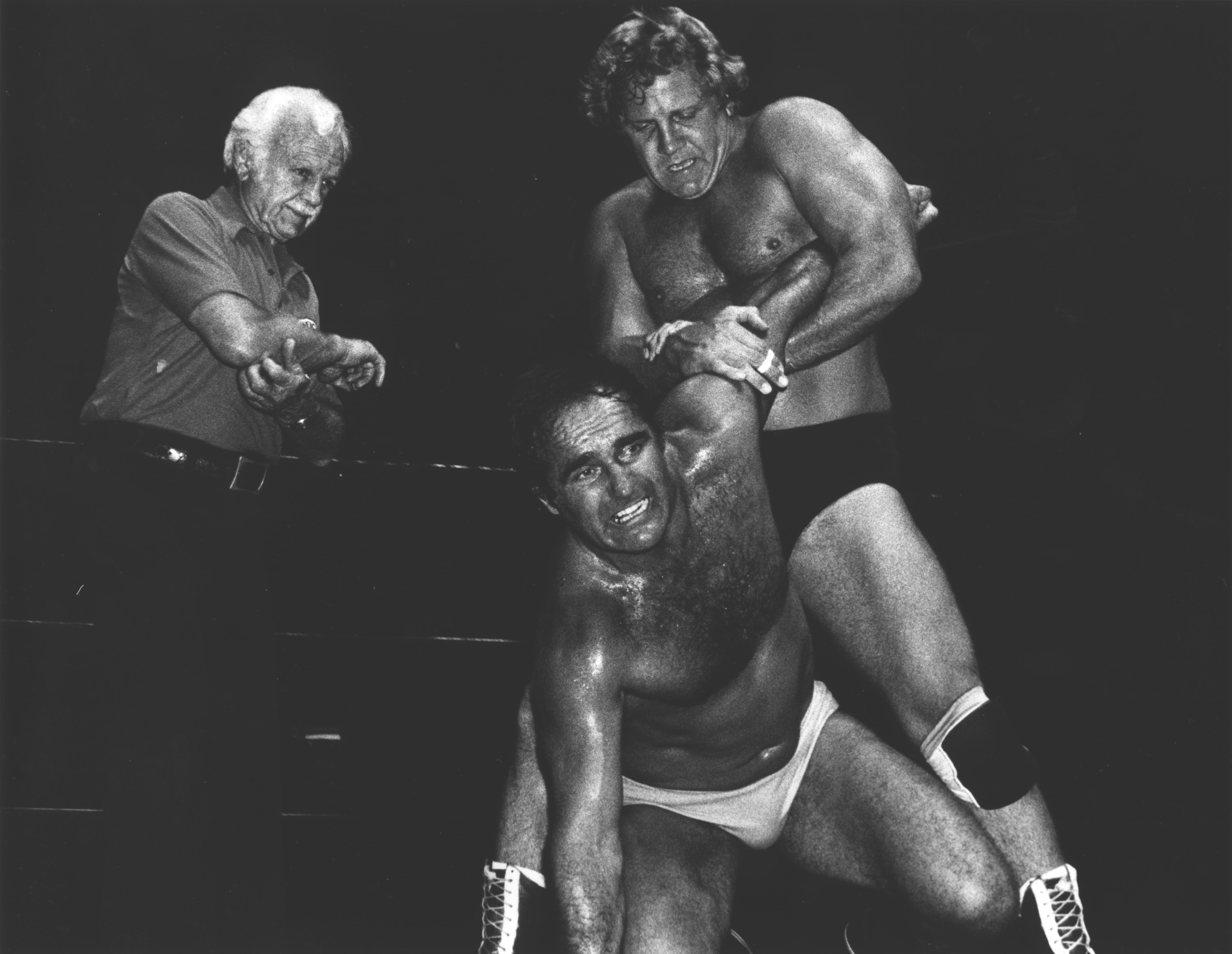
Tommy Seigler applies a hold to Nick Kozak while referee Danny McShain looks on.

Almost every professional wrestling match features referee, who is the final arbitrator of the fictional rules, which may vary from promotion to promotion. In multi-man lucha libre matches, two referees are used, one inside the ring and one outside. Due to the legitimate role that referees play in wrestling of serving as liaison between the bookers backstage and the wrestlers in the ring (the role of being a final arbitrator is merely kayfabe), the referee is present, even in matches that do not at first glance appear to require a referee (such as a ladder match, as it is no holds barred, and the criteria for victory could theoretically be assessed from afar). Although their actions are also frequently scripted for dramatic effect, referees are subject to certain general rules and requirements to maintain the theatrical appearance of unbiased authority. The most basic rule is that an action must be seen by a referee to be declared for a fall or disqualification. This allows for heel characters to gain a scripted advantage by distracting or disabling the referee to perform some ostensibly illegal maneuver on their opponent. Most referees are unnamed and essentially anonymous, although some wrestling promotions, most notably in the present All Elite Wrestling, have made officials known by their names (and there are some cases where fans have called their names during matches).

Special guest referees may be used from time to time; by virtue of their celebrity status, they are often scripted to dispense with the appearance of neutrality and use their influence to unfairly influence the outcome of the match for added dramatic impact. Face special referees will often fight back against hostile heel wrestlers, particularly if the special referee is either a wrestler himself or a famous martial artist (such as Tito Ortiz at the main event at Hard Justice 2005). For dramatic effect, heel referees may assist a heel wrestler. Several common plot devices involve the heel referee assisting the heel wrestler.

- Counting fast whenever the face wrestler is being pinned, while counting slow, faking a wrist or eye injury, or even refusing to count at all, when the heel wrestler is being pinned.
- Allowing heel wrestlers to use blatantly illegal tactics that most normal referees would instantly disqualify for, while not extending these relaxed rules to face wrestlers.
- Disqualifying the face wrestler for unfair reasons, such as an accidental attack on the referee or a maneuver that appears to be an illegal attack.
- Feigning unconsciousness far longer than they would normally otherwise be out, or using convenient distractions to look away from the wrestlers for a prolonged period of time. This allows for greater opportunities for run-ins or use of illegal weapons and tactics, or can be used as an excuse to avoid counting a pinfall or calling a submission in the face's favor. The referee is often instantly up the moment the heel wrestler seems to have an advantage, usually the moment the heel goes for the pinfall or applies a submission finisher.
- Directly assisting in attacking the face wrestler.

=== Tag rules ===
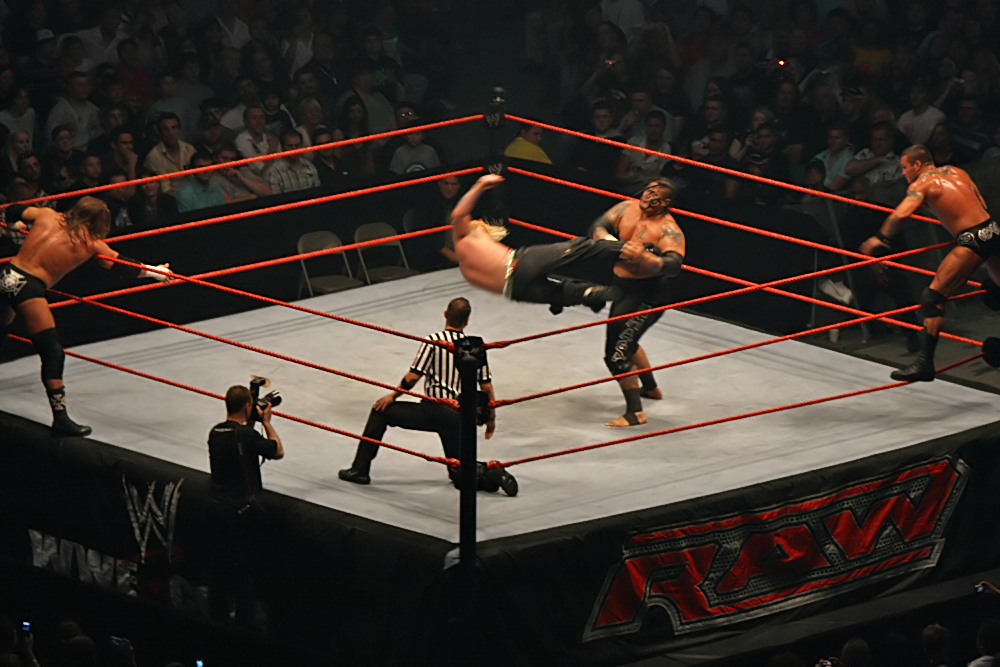
A tag team match in progress: Jeff Hardy kicks Umaga, while their respective partners, Triple H and Randy Orton, encourage them and reach for the tags,

In some team matches, there is a fictional premise that only one entrant from each team may be designated as the "legal" or "active" wrestler at any given moment. Two wrestlers must make physical contact in the corner (typically palm-to-palm) to transfer this legal status. This is known as a "tag", with the participants "tagging out" and "tagging in". Typically, the wrestler who is tagging out has a five count to leave the ring, whereas the one tagging in can enter the ring at any time, resulting in heels legally double-teaming a face. The non-legal wrestlers must remain outside the ring or other legal area at all times, and avoid purposeful contact with the opposing wrestlers, or face reprimand from the referee. In most promotions, the wrestler to be tagged in must be touching the turnbuckle on his corner, or a cloth strap attached to the turnbuckle.

Some multi-wrestler matches allow for a set number of legal wrestlers; this rule is commonplace in four-way tag team matches, where only two wrestlers are legal in the match, meaning two teams will have both members on the outside at any given time. In these matches, tags can be made between any two teams regardless if they are on the same team or not. As a result of this stipulation, tags between different teams are not usually mutual effort; a non-legal wrestler will usually tag themselves in against the legal wrestler's will. A legal wrestler will only voluntarily tag themselves out to another team if their own partner is incapacitated, or are being held in a submission hold and are closer to another tag team than their own.

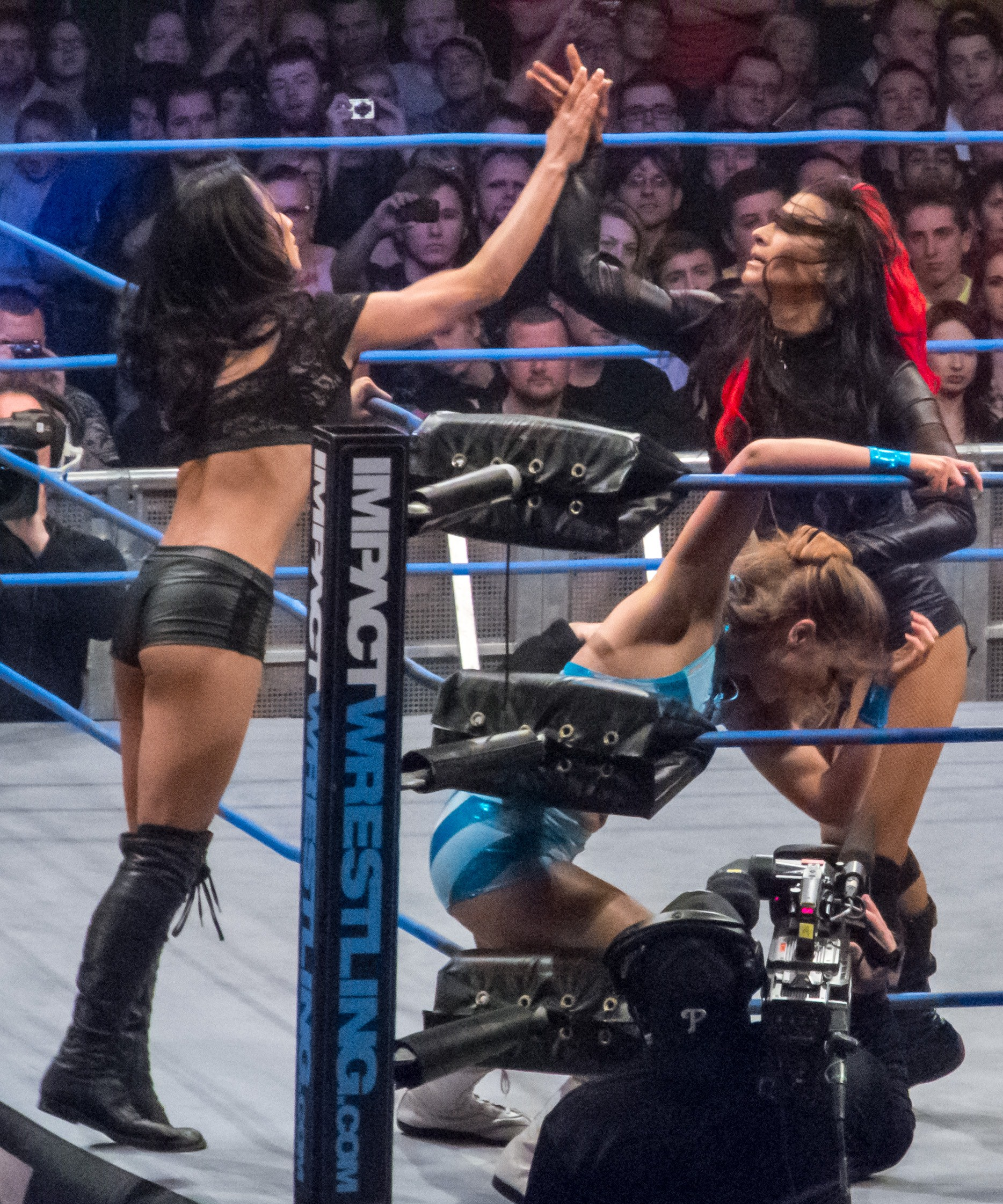
Tara (right) tags her partner, Gail Kim, into a match.

Sometimes, poly-sided matches that pit every man for himself will incorporate tagging rules. Outside of kayfabe, this is done to give wrestlers a break from the action (as these matches tend to go on for long periods of time), and to make the action in the ring easier to choreograph. One of the most mainstream examples of this is the Four-Corner match, the most common type of match in the WWE before it was replaced with its equivalent Fatal Four-Way; four wrestlers, each for himself, fight in a match, but only two wrestlers can be in the match at any given time. The other two are positioned in the corner, and tags can be made between any two wrestlers.

In a Texas Tornado Tag Team match, all the competitors are legal in the match, and tagging in and out is not necessary. All matches fought under hardcore rules (such as no disqualification, no holds barred, ladder match, etc.) are all contested under de facto Texas Tornado rules, since the lack of ability of a referee to issue a disqualification renders any tagging requirements moot. Regardless of rules of tagging, a wrestler cannot pin his or her own tag team partner, even if it is technically possible from the rules of the match (e.g. Texas Tornado rules, or a three-way tag team match). This is called the "Outlaw Rule" because the first team to attempt to use that (in an attempt to unfairly retain their tag team titles) was the New Age Outlaws.

=== Victory ===
Although scripted and choreographed, wrestling matches are presented as being legitimate athletic competitions decided on one of several possible outcomes.

==== Pinfall ====
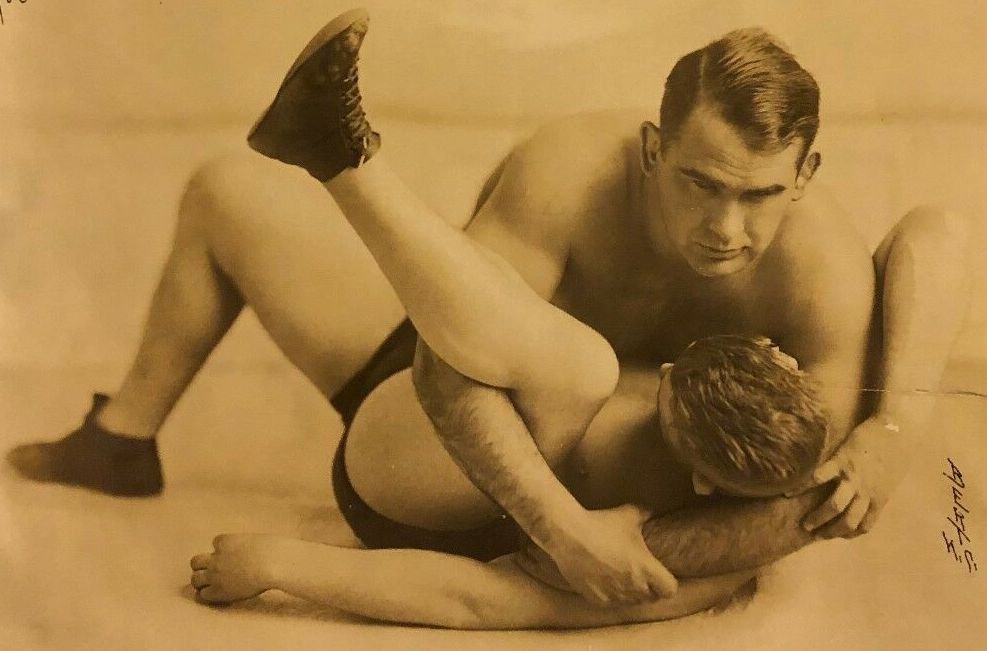
Ed "Strangler" Lewis pins an opponent in 1929.

A match's fictional premise may allow a score by pinfall, in which a wrestling performer must pin both their opponent's shoulders against the mat while the referee slaps the mat three times (referred to as a "three count"). This is the most common form presented a defeat. The pinned wrestler must also be on their back (if the opponent is lying on their stomach, it usually does not count). A count may be started at any time that a wrestler's shoulders are down (both shoulders touching the mat), back-first and any part of the opponent's body is lying over the wrestler. This often results in pins that can easily be kicked out of, if the defensive wrestler is even slightly conscious. For example, an attacking wrestler who is half-conscious may simply drape an arm over an opponent, or a cocky wrestler may place a foot gently on the opponent's body, prompting a three-count from the referee.

Sometimes, an unconscious wrestler can win a match accidentally by "falling" on top of another unconscious wrestler, triggering the aforementioned rule of prompting a three count. Sometimes, a wrestler's manager and/or other wrestler in his corner may interfere and create such a pinfall scenario. However, the main event at Night 2 of Wrestlemania 37 was a unique exception to this. Both Edge and Daniel Bryan were knocked out. Roman Reigns (the only conscious wrestler at the time) draped Edge's unconscious body over that of Daniel Bryan, but that didn't prompt a three count from the referee until Reigns, too, pinned both opponents simultaneously.

In some promotions, there is a premise that certain pinning methods are disallowed, including using the ropes for leverage and hooking the opponent's clothing. As a plot device, disallowed pinning methods can be depicted as a cheating method for heels. Pins such as these are rarely seen by the referee and are often used by heels and on occasion by cheating faces to win matches. Even if it is noticed, storylines rarely result in a disqualification and instead it simply results in nullification of the pin attempt, so the wrestler rarely has anything to lose. Occasionally, there are instances where a pinfall is presented as being made where both wrestlers' shoulders were on the mat for the three-count. This situation will most likely lead to a draw, and in some cases a continuation of the match or a future match to determine the winner.

If a wrestler's shoulders are flat on the mat, even while locked in a submission hold like a figure-four leglock, it can legally be counted as a pinfall. This rule exists solely because pinfalls and submissions are separate win conditions, and the referee must call a pin whenever both shoulders are down for a three-count, regardless of the situation. Even if a wrestler is applying or enduring a submission hold, the referee's job is to check shoulders first. If they are down, the match can end by pinfall before a tap-out occurs. Wrestlers applying submissions on the mat (like triangle chokes or armbars) sometimes unintentionally put their own shoulders down, risking being pinned while trying to force a tap. Some promotions use this rule to add drama—forcing wrestlers to balance between maintaining a painful hold and protecting themselves from being pinned.

==== Submission ====
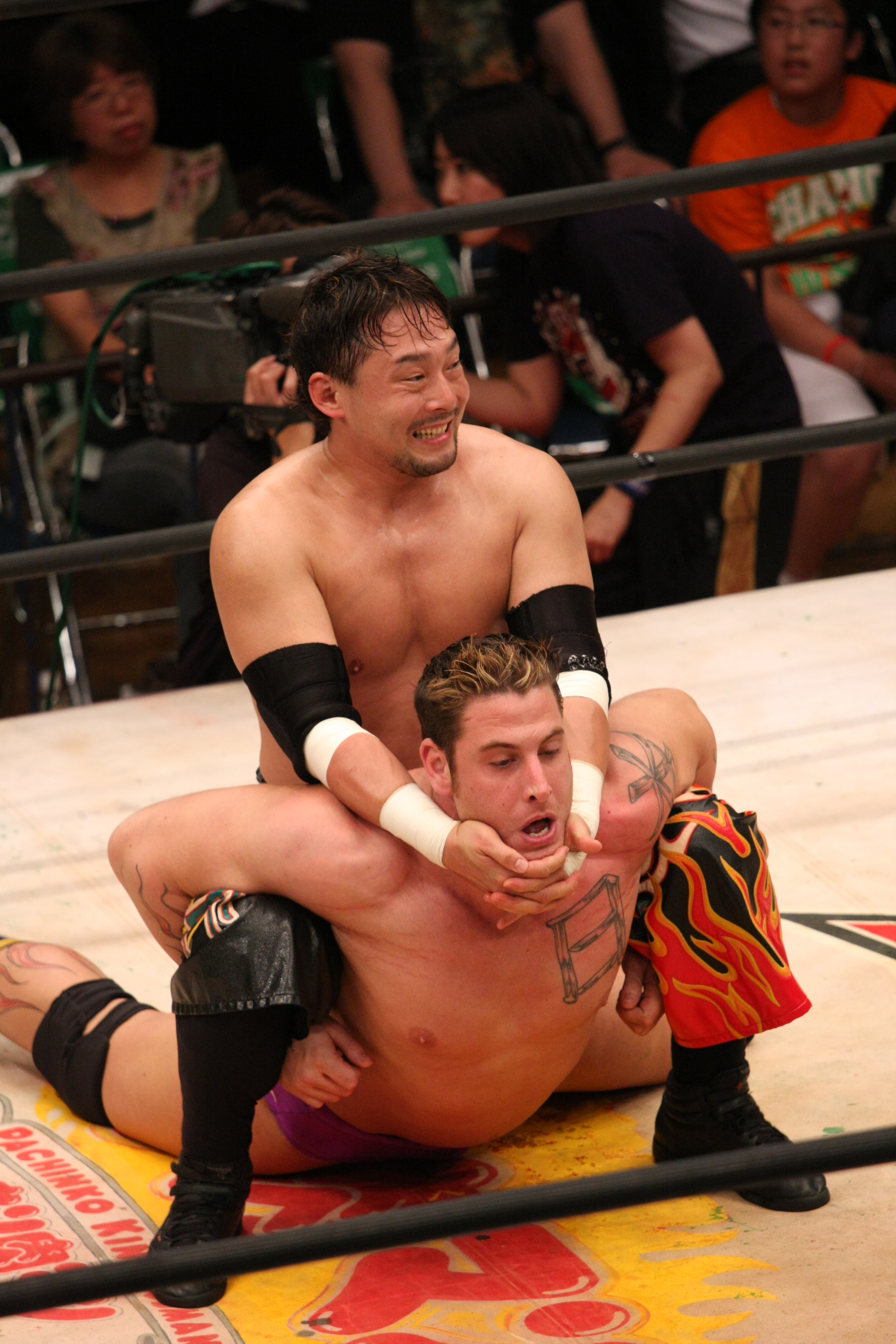
Tajiri performs a camel clutch submission hold on René Duprée.

To score by submission, the performer must make their opponent give up, usually by putting them in a submission hold (e.g. figure four leg-lock, arm-lock, sleeper-hold). A performer may appear to voluntarily submit by verbally informing the referee (usually used in moves such as the Mexican Surfboard, where all four limbs are incapacitated, making tapping impossible). Since Ken Shamrock popularized it in 1997, a wrestler can indicate a voluntary submission by "tapping out", that is, tapping a free hand against the mat or against an opponent. Submission was initially a large factor in professional wrestling, but following the decline of the submission-oriented catch-as-catch-can style from mainstream professional wrestling, the submission largely faded. Despite this, some wrestlers, such as Chris Jericho, Ric Flair, Bret Hart, Kurt Angle, Ken Shamrock, Dean Malenko, Chris Benoit, Bryan Danielson, and Tazz, became famous for their fictional depictions of winning matches via submission. A wrestler with a signature submission technique is portrayed as better at applying the hold, making it more painful or more difficult to get out of than others, or can be falsely credited as inventing the hold (such as when Tazz popularized the kata ha jime judo choke in pro wrestling as the "Tazzmission").

Under wrestling nominal rules, all contact between the wrestlers must cease if any part of the body is touching or underneath the ropes. As such, many performances will attempt to break submission holds by deliberately grabbing the bottom ropes. This is called a "rope break", and it is one of the most common ways to break a submission hold. Most holds leave an arm or leg free, so that the person can tap out if they want. Instead, they use these free limbs to either grab one of the ring ropes or drape their foot across or underneath one. Once this has been accomplished and witnessed by the referee, the referee will demand that the offending wrestler break the hold and start counting to five if the wrestler does not. If the referee reaches the count of five and the wrestler still does not break the hold, they are disqualified.

If a manager decides that their wrestler presented as their client should tap out, but cannot convince the wrestler to do so, they may "throw in the towel" (by literally taking a gym towel and hurling it into the ring where the referee can see it). This is the same as a submission, as in kayfabe the manager is considered the wrestler's agent and therefore authorized to make formal decisions (such as forfeiting a match) on the client's behalf.

==== Knockout ====
Some wrestling performances are presented as resulting in a knockout, mirroring legitimate martial arts and concluding with a technical knockout or technical submission. To determine if a wrestler has passed out in WWE, the referee usually picks up and drops his hand. If it drops to the mat or floor one or three consecutive times without the wrestler having the strength to hold it up, the wrestler is considered to have passed out. A performer can also be presented as winning by technical knockout even if he does not resort to submission holds, but still beats the opponent to the point of unconsciousness or to the impossibility to defend himself. To check for a technical knockout in this manner a referee would wave his hand in front of the wrestler's face and, if this produces no reaction of any kind, the referee would award the victory to the other wrestler. A wrestler can also request a ten-count from the referee when, under the event's fictional premise, they think an opponent is sufficiently incapacitated to not be able to stand before the count of ten. Except in traditional European promotions where following down on a fallen opponent was prohibited, these knockouts are rarely used or mentioned as logically it makes more sense for a wrestler to actively pin an opponent for three seconds rather than leaving an opponent the chance to stand up before ten. In such European promotions, countouts as described below are treated as a variant of a knockout.

==== Countout ====
A performance can be depicted as ending in a countout (alternatively spelled as "count-out" or "count out"), where wrestler is out of the ring long enough for the referee to count to ten (twenty in some promotions) and thus, under the event's fictional premise, is disqualified. The count is broken and restarted when a wrestler in the ring exits the ring. Playing into this, some wrestlers are depicted as "milking" the count by sliding in the ring and immediately sliding back out. As the wrestler was technically inside the ring for a split second before exiting again, it is sufficient to restart the count. This is often referred to by commentators as "breaking the count". Heels often use this tactic in order to buy themselves more time to catch their breath, or to attempt to frustrate their babyface opponents.

If all the active wrestlers in a match are down inside the ring at the same time, the referee begins a count (usually ten seconds, twenty in Japan). If nobody rises to their feet by the end of the count, the match is ruled a draw. Any participant who stands up in time ends the count for everyone else, while in a Last Man Standing match this form of a countout is the only way that the match can end, so the referee counts when one or more wrestlers are down and one wrestler standing up before the 10-count does not stop the count for another wrestler who is still down. In most major modern promotions, championships are not permitted to change hands via a countout, unless the on-screen authority figure declares otherwise; this rule varies in some promotions, however. In some storylines, heels are presented as taking advantage of this and will intentionally get counted out when facing difficult opponents while defending championships.

==== Disqualification ====
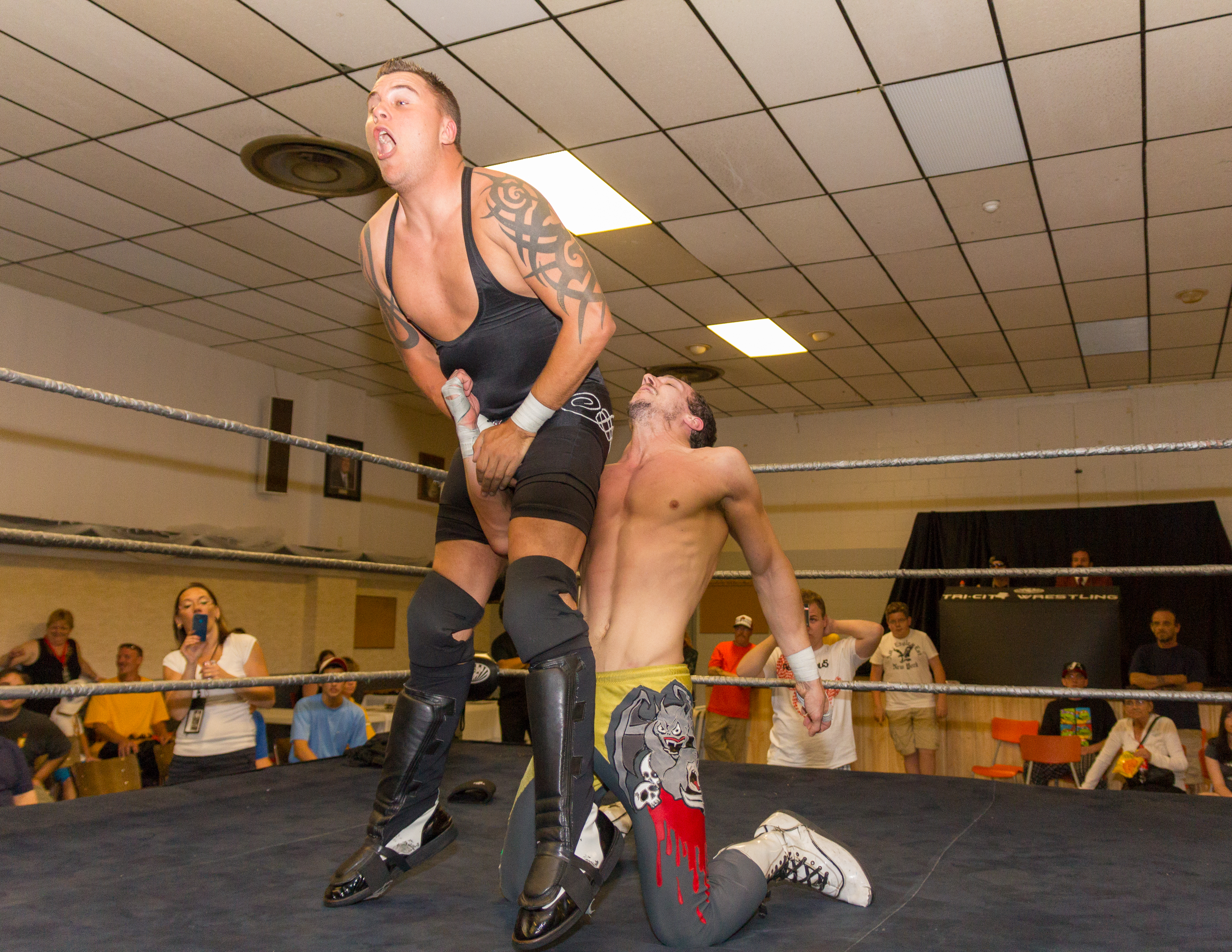
A low blow typically results in a disqualification if caught by a referee.

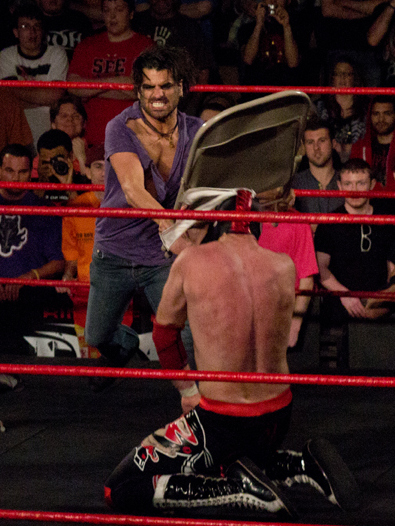
Jimmy Jacobs strikes El Generico with a folding chair. Within wrestling's fictional storylines, such attacks will get a wrestler disqualified in most matches if caught by a referee.

Disqualification (sometimes abbreviated as "DQ") occurs when a wrestler violates the rules established as part of the performance's fictional premise, thus losing automatically. Although a countout can technically be considered a disqualification (as it is, for all intents and purposes, an automatic loss suffered as a result of violating a match rule), the two concepts are often distinct in wrestling. A no disqualification match can still end by countout (although this is rare). Typically, a match must be declared a "no holds barred" match, a "street fight" or some other term, in order for both disqualifications and countouts to be waived. Disqualification from a match is called when the fictional storyline involves:

- Performing any illegal holds or maneuvers, such as refusing to break a hold when an opponent is in the ropes, hair-pulling, choking or biting an opponent, or repeatedly punching with a closed fist. These violations are usually subject to a referee-administered five count and will result in disqualification if the wrestler does not cease the offending behavior in time. Note that the ban on closed fists does not apply if the attacker is in midair when the punch connects, like with Jerry Lawler's diving fist drop or Roman Reigns's Superman Punch.
- Deliberate injury of an opponent, such as attacking an opponent's eye, such as raking it, poking it, gouging it, punching it or other severe attacks to the eye. This was imposed when Sexy Star was disqualified for a legitimate injury on Rosemary at AAA Triplemanía XXV by popping her arm out of the socket. This type of disqualification can also be grounds for stripping a wrestler of a championship, as AAA overturned the result of that AAA Women's Championship match, stripping her of the title.
- Any outside interference involving a person not involved in the match striking or holding a wrestler. Sometimes (depending on the promotion and uniqueness of the situation), if a heel attempts to interfere but is ejected from the ring by a wrestler or referee before this occurs, there may not be a disqualification (All Elite Wrestling is known to use ejections, as AEW referees Earl Hebner and Aubrey Edwards have ejected numerous wrestlers during events, all for outside interference).
  - In this disqualification method, the wrestler being attacked by the foreign member is awarded the win. Sometimes this can work in heels' favor. In February 2009, Shawn Michaels, who was under the kayfabe employment of John "Bradshaw" Layfield, interfered in a match and super kicked JBL in front of the referee to get his employer the win via "outside interference".
  - A half-exception exists for a wrestler's manager, which is permitted to have some, extremely limited involvement in the match, although exactly where the line is drawn is ultimately up to the referee's discretion. This half-exception is best on display in the main event of the June 28, 1999, edition of Raw, where Stone Cold Steve Austin faced The Undertaker for the WWE Championship. In that match, there was a zero-tolerance rule in place, whereby, if anyone from the back got within 10 feet of the ring (even if they didn't interfere, per se), the Undertaker would be immediately disqualified and Steve Austin would be awarded the title. Despite this supposedly zero-tolerance rule, Paul Bearer was allowed to accompany The Undertaker to ringside, as he was the Undertaker's manager at the time, and he even interfered at one point, in the final minute of the match, by pulling the referee out of the ring to prevent him from completing a pinfall. Despite this interference and the zero-tolerance rule in place, Undertaker still was not disqualified, and Austin continued to fight on and eventually win the match by pinfall.
- Striking an opponent with a foreign object (an object not permitted by the rules of the match; see hardcore wrestling). Sometimes the win decision can be reversed if the referee spots the weapon before pin attempt or after the match because a wrestler tried to strike when the referee was either distracted or knocked out.
- Using any kind of "banned" move
- A direct low blow to the groin (unless the rules of the match specifically allow this).
- Intentionally laying hands on the referee. An exception exists for pulling the referee (usually by the ankles) away from a pinfall attempt to prevent him from completing the three count, without hurting him.
- Pulling an opponent's mask off during a match (this is illegal in Mexico, and sometimes in Japan).
- Throwing an opponent over the top rope during a match (illegal in the National Wrestling Alliance).
- In a mixed tag team match, a male wrestler hitting a female wrestler (intergender), or a normal sized wrestler attacking an opposing midget wrestler (tag team matches involving teams with one normal-sized and one midget wrestler).

In the fictional universe of some promotions, not all rule violations result in a disqualification as the referee may be depicted as using his own judgement and is not obligated to stop the match. Usually, the only offenses that the referee will see and immediately disqualify a wrestler for (as opposed to having multiple offenses) are low blows, weapon usage, interference, or assaulting the referee.

In WWE and most English-speaking promotions, the plot convention is that a referee must see the violation with his own eyes to rule that the match end in a disqualification (simply watching the video tape is usually not enough). However, a slight exception exists when a wrestler uses a foreign object, and the referee can still see the "smoking gun" evidence before the cheating wrestler has disposed of it. One of the most prolific examples of this exception occurred at the 2024 Royal Rumble PLE, where Kevin Owens challenged Logan Paul for the WWE United States Championship. In the match's ending, Logan Paul attempted to illegally use brass knuckles against Owens, but Owens disarmed Paul and used the knucks on Paul himself, knocking him unconscious and pinning him. However, at the last minute, the referee saw the knuckles on Owens' hand and put two and two together. Even though the referee technically didn't see the knockout shot, he nevertheless called the disqualification. Sometimes, this narrow exception can be exploited. For example, some heels may notice a referee coming to after a ref bump and proceed to smack a steel chair on the mat, causing a sound effect, then immediately throw it to his opponent and play possum, hoping the referee will invoke this narrow exception in their favor. This technique was made famous by Eddie Guerrero, who famously used it to win his last-ever televised match on the November 11, 2005, episode of WWE SmackDown.

The referee's ruling is almost always final, although "Dusty finishes" (named after, and made famous by, Dusty Rhodes) will often result in the referee's decision being overturned. It is not uncommon for the referees themselves to get knocked out during a match, which is commonly referred to by the term "ref bump". While the referee remains "unconscious", wrestlers are free to violate rules until he is revived or replaced. In some cases, a referee might disqualify a person under the presumption that it was that wrestler who knocked him out; most referee knockouts are arranged to allow a wrestler, usually a heel, to gain an advantage. For example, a wrestler may get whipped into a referee at a slower speed, knocking the ref down for short amount of time; during that interim period, one wrestler may pin his opponent for a three-count and would have won the match but for the referee being down (sometimes, another referee will sprint to the ring from backstage to attempt to make the count, but by then, the other wrestler has had enough time to kick out on his own accord). In most promotions, a championship title cannot normally change hands via disqualification; this rule is explicitly enforced in a title match under special circumstances.

In traditional European promotions, severe or persistent infractions of the rules result in a formal caution, called a "public warning" in the UK, "avertissement" (warning) in France and a soccer-style yellow card in Germany. Three of these will result in disqualification (a red card in Germany). One major North American promotion (Stampede Wrestling of Calgary) also used the German card system from the late 1970s onward. If all participants in a match continue to breach the referee's instructions, the staged performance may presented as ending in a double disqualification, where both wrestlers and/or teams (in a tag team match) have been disqualified. The match is essentially nullified and called a draw or in some cases a restart or the same match being held at a pay-per-view or next night's show. Sometimes, in a match to determine the challenger for a heel champion's title, the champion is forced to face both opponents simultaneously for the title. Usually, the double disqualification is caused by the heel wrestler's associates in a match between two face wrestlers to determine his opponent.

==== Forfeit ====
Although extremely rare, some fictional storylines involve a match ending in a forfeit if the opponent is depicted as either not showing up for the match, or showing up but refusing to compete. Although the plot premise is that championship usually cannot change hands except by pinfall or submission, a forfeit victory is enough to crown a new champion. A famous example of this happened on the December 8, 1997, episode of Raw Is War, when Stone Cold Steve Austin handed the WWF Intercontinental Championship to The Rock after refusing to defend the title. When a pay-per-view match is booked and one wrestler is unable to make it for one reason or another, the genre convention is to insert a last-minute replacement rather than award a wrestler a victory by forfeit. Forfeit victories are almost always reserved for when the story the promotion is telling specifically requires such an ending. Despite being statistically an extremely rare occurrence, Charles Wright is one wrestler whose gimmick was centered around forfeit victories. During the late 1990s, Wright called himself "The Godfather" and portrayed the gimmick of a pimp. He often brought multiple women, whom he referred to as "hos", to the ring with him, and offered them to his opponents in exchange for their forfeit.

==== Draw ====
A professional wrestling match can be depicted as ending in a draw. A draw occurs if both opponents are simultaneously disqualified (e.g. Brock Lesnar vs. The Undertaker at Unforgiven 2002), neither opponent is able to answer a ten-count (e.g. Shawn Michaels vs. Triple H at Royal Rumble 2004), or both opponents simultaneously win the match. The latter can occur if, for example, both wrestlers pin each other (e.g. MJF vs. Adam Cole at All In 2023, before the match was restarted), or one competitor scores a submission victory while the other scores a pinfall victory (e.g. Kurt Angle being pinned while successfully applying the triangle choke to The Undertaker on a 2002 episode of SmackDown). Traditionally, a championship may not change hands in the event of a draw. A variant of the draw is the time-limit draw, where the match does not have a winner by a specified time period; a one-hour draw, which was once common, is known in wrestling circles as a "Broadway". In European promotions where wrestling is traditionally timed in rounds, a best of three falls match is stopped and declared a one-fall-each draw if an equalizing pinfall or submission is scored in the final round.

==== No contest ====
A wrestling match may be declared a no contest if, under the fictional storyline, the winning conditions are unable to occur. The storyline may attribute such an outcome to factors such as excessive interference, the loss of referee's control over the match, an injury unrelated to the fictitious storyline, or other fictional circumstances presenting the scheduled match to even begin. A no contest is a state separate and distinct from a draw — a draw indicates winning conditions were met. Although the terms are sometimes used interchangeably in practice, this usage is technically incorrect.

=== Other dramatic elements ===
While each wrestling match is ostensibly a competition of athletics and strategy, the goal from a business standpoint is to excite and entertain the audience. Although the competition is staged, dramatic emphasis draws out the most intense reaction. Heightened interest results in higher attendance, increased ticket sales, higher ratings on television broadcasts (greater ad revenue), higher pay-per-view buyrates, and sales of branded merchandise and recorded video footage. All of these contribute to the profit of the promotion company.

==== Character gimmicks ====
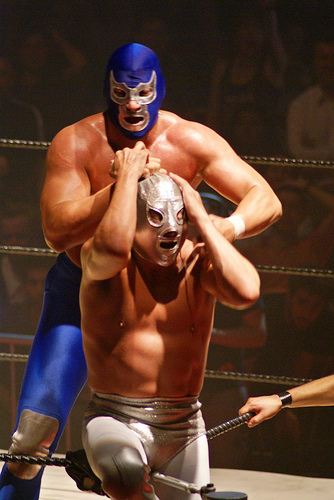
Mexican wrestlers Blue Demon Jr. (in blue) and El Hijo del Santo. Both parents of these performers were two of the early luchadores to have a gimmick. El Santo was known as "El Enmascarado de Plata" (The Silver Masked) and Blue Demon was his long time frenemy.

In Latin America and English-speaking countries, most wrestlers (and other on-stage performers) portray character roles, sometimes with personalities wildly different from their own. These personalities are a gimmick intended to heighten interest in a wrestler without regard to athletic ability. Some can be unrealistic and cartoon-like (such as Doink the Clown), while others carry more verisimilitude (such as Chris Jericho, The Rock, John Cena, Steve Austin, and CM Punk). In lucha libre, many characters wear masks, adopting a secret identity akin to a superhero or a supervillain, a near-sacred tradition.

An individual wrestler may use their real name, or a minor variation of it, for much of their career, such as Bret Hart, John Cena and Randy Orton. Others can keep one ring name for their entire career (Shawn Michaels, CM Punk, and Ricky Steamboat), or may change from time to time to better suit the demands of the audience or company. Sometimes a character is owned and trademarked by the company, forcing the wrestler to find a new one when he leaves, although a simple typeset change such as changing Rhyno to Rhino can get around this, and sometimes a character is owned by the wrestler. Sometimes, a wrestler may change their legal name to obtain ownership of their ring name (Andrew Martin and Warrior). Many wrestlers (such as The Rock and The Undertaker) are strongly identified with their character, even responding to the name in public or between friends. Proper decorum is for wrestlers to refer to each other by their stage names/characters rather than their birth/legal names, unless otherwise introduced. A character can become so popular that it appears in other media (Hulk Hogan and El Santo) or even gives the performer enough visibility to enter politics (Antonio Inoki and Jesse Ventura).

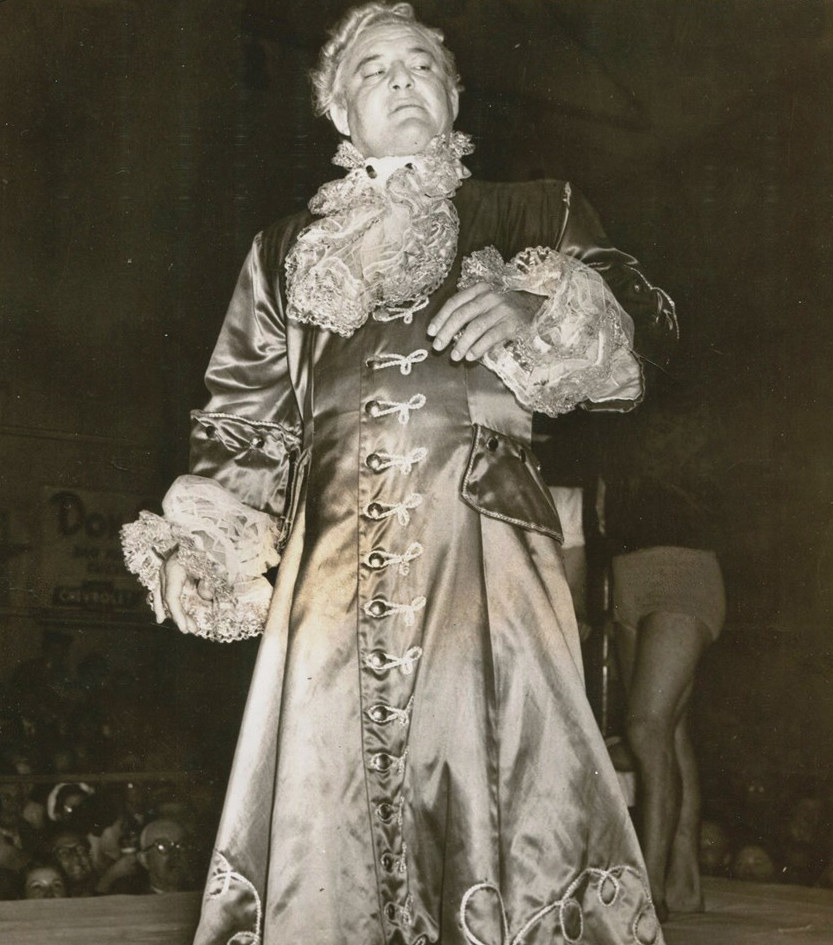
Gorgeous George's flamboyant gimmick made him one of the most famous wrestlers of his era.

Typically, matches are staged between a protagonist (historically an audience favorite, known as a babyface, or "the good guy") and an antagonist (historically a villain with arrogance, a tendency to break rules, or other unlikable qualities, called a heel, or "the bad guy"). In the early decades of the 21st century, antiheroes have also become prominent in professional wrestling. There is also a less common role of a "tweener", who is neither fully face nor fully heel yet able to play either role effectively (case in point, Samoa Joe during his first run in Impact Wrestling from June 2005 to November 2006).

At times, a character may "turn", altering their face/heel alignment. This may be an abrupt, surprising event, or it may slowly build over time. It is almost always accomplished with a markable change in behavior. Some turns become defining points in a career, as when Hulk Hogan turned heel after being a top face for over a decade. Others may have no noticeable effect on the character's status. If a character repeatedly switches between face and heel, this lessens the effect of such turns, and may result in apathy from the audience.

Big Show is a good example of having more heel and face turns than anyone in WWE history. Sometimes a character's heel turn will become so popular that eventually the audience response will alter the character's heel-face cycle to the point where the heel persona will, in practice, become a face persona, and what was previously the face persona, will turn into the heel persona, such as when Dwayne Johnson first began using "The Rock" persona as a heel character, as opposed to his original "Rocky Maivia" babyface persona. Another legendary example is Stone Cold Steve Austin, who was originally booked as a heel, with such mannerisms as drinking on the job, using profanity, breaking company property, and even breaking into people's private homes, as in the case of Brian Pillman. The fans' response to Austin was so positive that he effectively became one of the most popular antiheroes in professional wrestling. Austin, along with the stable of D-Generation X, Bret Hart and his Hart Foundation, is generally credited with ushering the Attitude Era of WWF programming.

==== Story ====
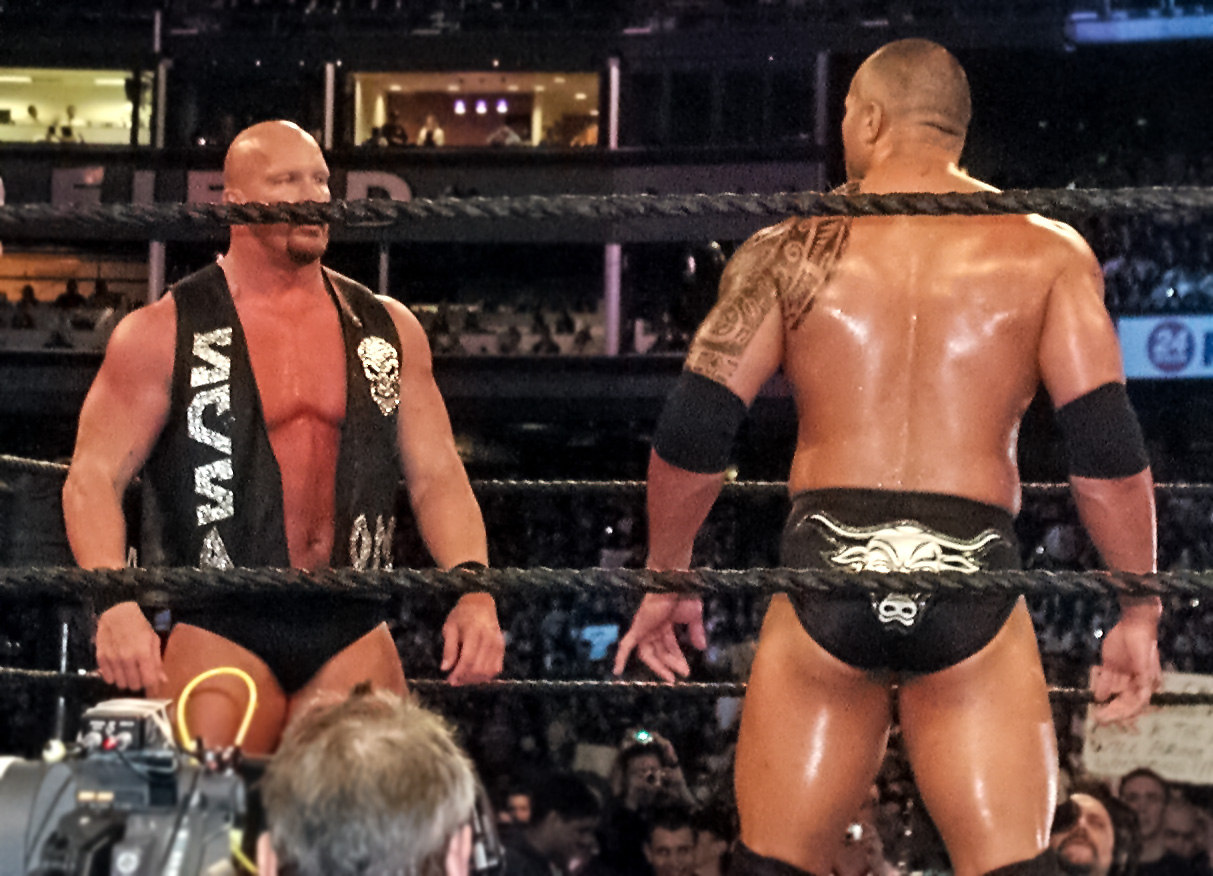
Stone Cold Steve Austin and The Rock were frequent rivals throughout WWF's Attitude Era.

While real exhibition matches are now not uncommon, most matches tell a story analogous to an episode of a serial drama: the face will from time to time win (triumph) or from time to time lose (tragedy), and longer story arcs can result from a couple of matches. Since most promotions have a championship title, opposition for the championship is a frequent impetus for stories. For added stakes, anything from a character's own hair to their job can be wagered in a match. Some matches are designed to further the story of only one participant. It could be intended to portray an unstoppable force, a lucky underdog, a sore loser, or any other characterization. Sometimes non-wrestling vignettes are shown to enhance a character's image without the need for matches.

Other stories result from a natural rivalry. Outside of performance, these are referred to as feuds. A feud can exist between any number of participants and can last from a few days to decades. The feud between Ric Flair and Ricky Steamboat lasted from the late 1970s into the early 1990s and allegedly spanned over two thousand matches (although most of those matches were mere dark matches). The career-spanning history between characters Mike Awesome and Masato Tanaka is another example of a long-running feud, as is the case of Steve Austin vs. Vince McMahon, one of the most lucrative feuds in the World Wrestling Federation during 1998 and 1999.

In theory, the longer a feud is built up, the more audience interest (aka heat) lasts. The main event of a wrestling show is generally the most heated. Commonly, a heel will hold the upper hand over a face until a final showdown, heightening dramatic tension as the face's fans desire to see them win. Throughout the history of professional wrestling, many other elements of media have been utilized in professional wrestling storytelling: pre- and post-match interviews, "backstage" skits, positions of authority and worked behind-the-scenes feuds, division rankings (typically the No. 1 contendership spot), contracts, lotteries, news stories on websites, and in recent years social media.

Anything that can be used as an element of drama can exist in professional wrestling stories: romantic relationships (including love triangles and marriage), racism, classism, nepotism, favoritism, corporate corruption, family bonds, personal histories, grudges, theft, cheating, assault, betrayal, bribery, seduction, stalking, confidence tricks, extortion, blackmail, substance abuse, self-doubt, self-sacrifice; even kidnapping, sexual fetishism, necrophilia, misogyny, rape and death have been portrayed in wrestling. Some promotions have included supernatural elements such as magic, curses, the undead and Satanic imagery (most notably the Undertaker and his Ministry of Darkness, a stable that regularly performed evil rituals and human sacrifice in Satanic-like worship of a hidden power figure). Commentators have become important in communicating the relevance of the characters' actions to the story at hand, filling in past details and pointing out subtle actions that may otherwise go unnoticed.

===== Promos =====
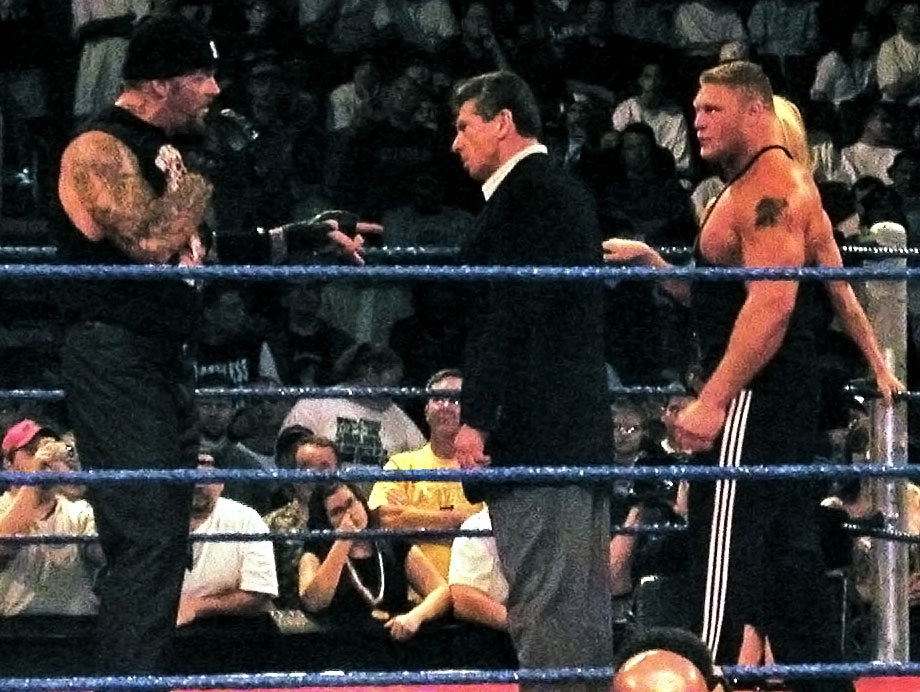
The Undertaker cuts a promo with Vince McMahon, Brock Lesnar, and Sable looking on.

A main part of storytelling in wrestling is a promo, short for promotional interview. Promos are performed, or "cut" in wrestling jargon, for a variety of reasons, including to heighten interest in a wrestler, or to hype an upcoming match. Since the crowd is often too loud or the venue too large for promos to be heard naturally, wrestlers generally use amplification when speaking in the ring. Unlike most stage acting, large and highly visible handheld microphones are typically used and wrestlers frequently speak directly to the audience.

==== Championships ====
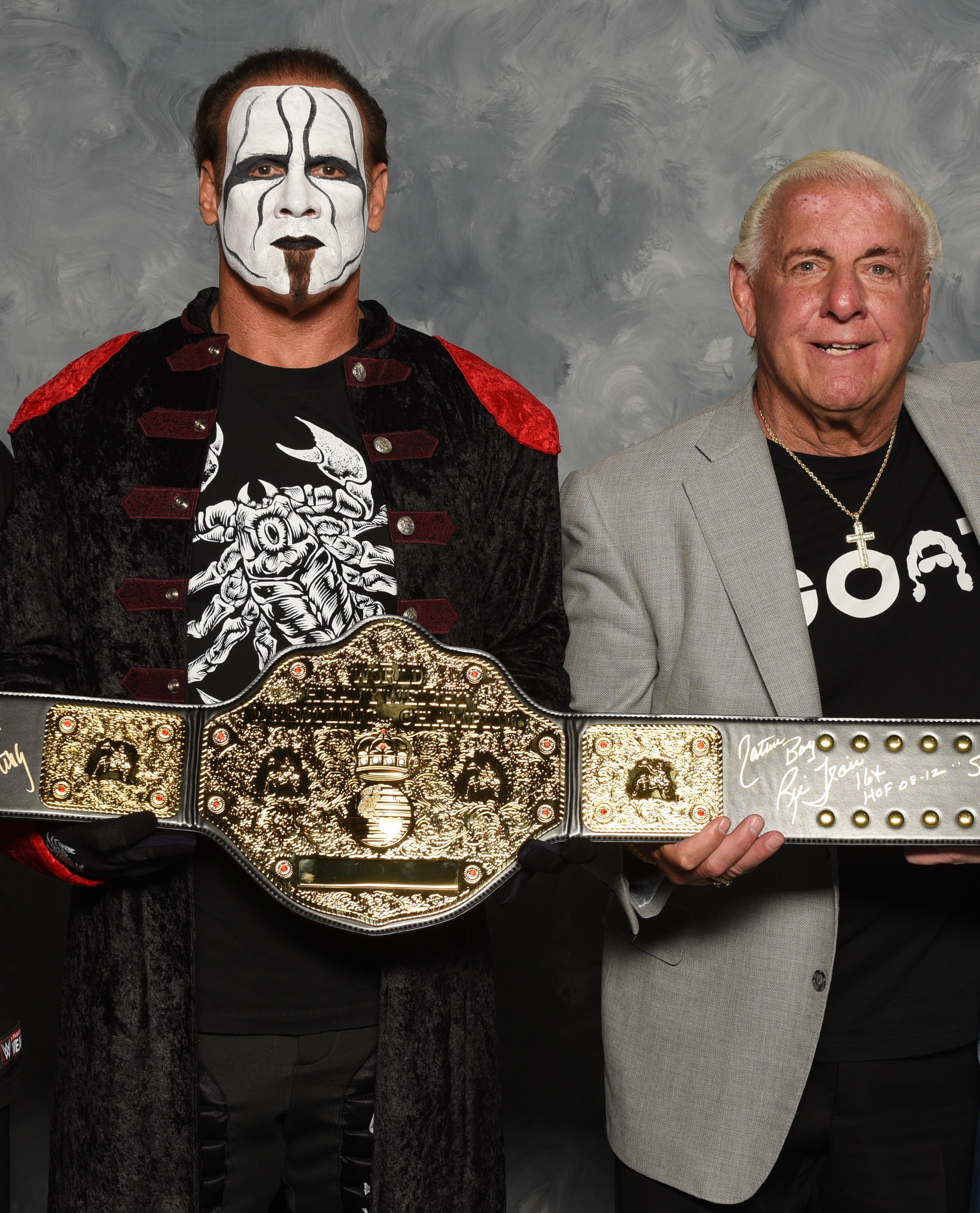
Sting and Ric Flair holding a replica of the Big Gold Belt, which represented six different championships

Professional wrestling mimics the structure of title match combat sports. Participants compete for a championship and must defend it after winning it. These titles are represented physically by a title belt that can be worn by the champion. In the case of team wrestling, there is a title belt for each member of the team. Almost all professional wrestling promotions have at least one title, and some have more. Championships are designated by divisions of weight, height, gender, wrestling style and other qualifications.

Typically, each promotion only recognizes the "legitimacy" of their own titles, although cross-promotion does happen. When one promotion absorbs or purchases another, the titles from the defunct promotion may continue to be defended in the new promotion or be decommissioned. Behind the scenes, the bookers in a company will place the title on the most accomplished performer, or those the bookers believe will generate fan interest in terms of event attendance and television viewership. Historically, a world champion was typically a legitimate shooter/hooker who had the skills to prevent double crosses by shooters who would deviate from the planned finish for personal glory. Lower ranked titles may also be used on the performers who show potential, thus allowing them greater exposure to the audience. Other circumstances may also determine the use of a championship. A combination of a championship's lineage, the caliber of performers as champion, and the frequency and manner of title changes, dictates the audience's perception of the title's quality, significance and reputation.

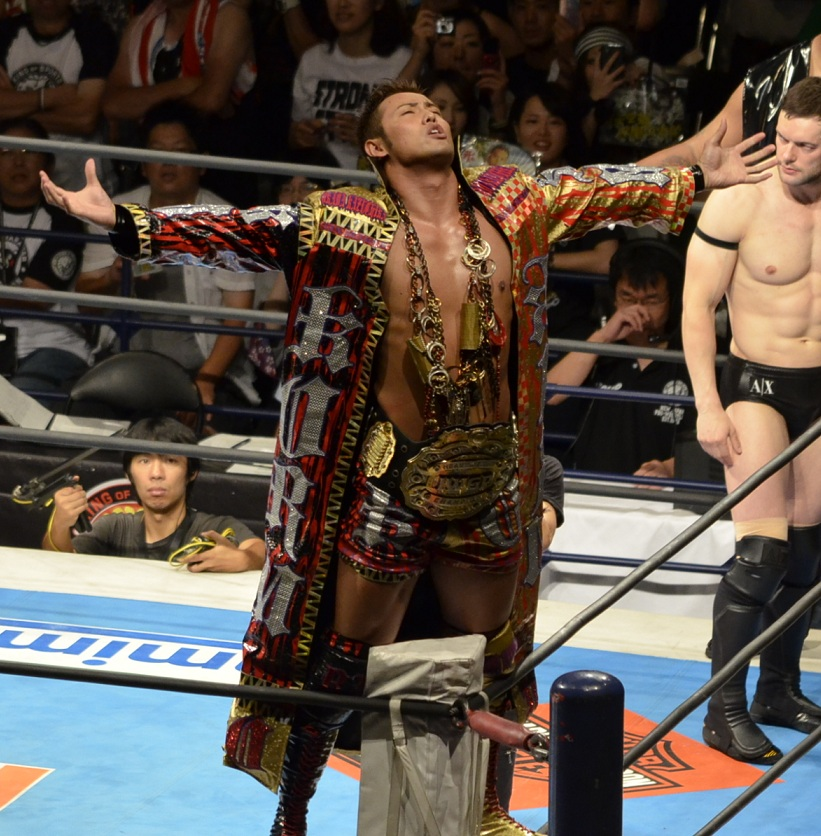
Kazuchika Okada held the IWGP Heavyweight Championship (the world championship of New Japan Pro-Wrestling) five times and holds the record for the longest reign.

A wrestler's championship accomplishments can be central to their career, becoming a measure of their performance ability and drawing power. In general, a wrestler with multiple title reigns or an extended title reign is indicative of a wrestler's ability to maintain audience interest or a wrestler's ability to perform in the ring. As such, the most accomplished or decorated wrestlers tend to be revered as legends due to the amount of title reigns they hold. American wrestler Ric Flair has had multiple world heavyweight championship reigns spanning over three decades. Japanese wrestler Último Dragón once held and defended a record ten titles simultaneously.

==== Ring entrance ====
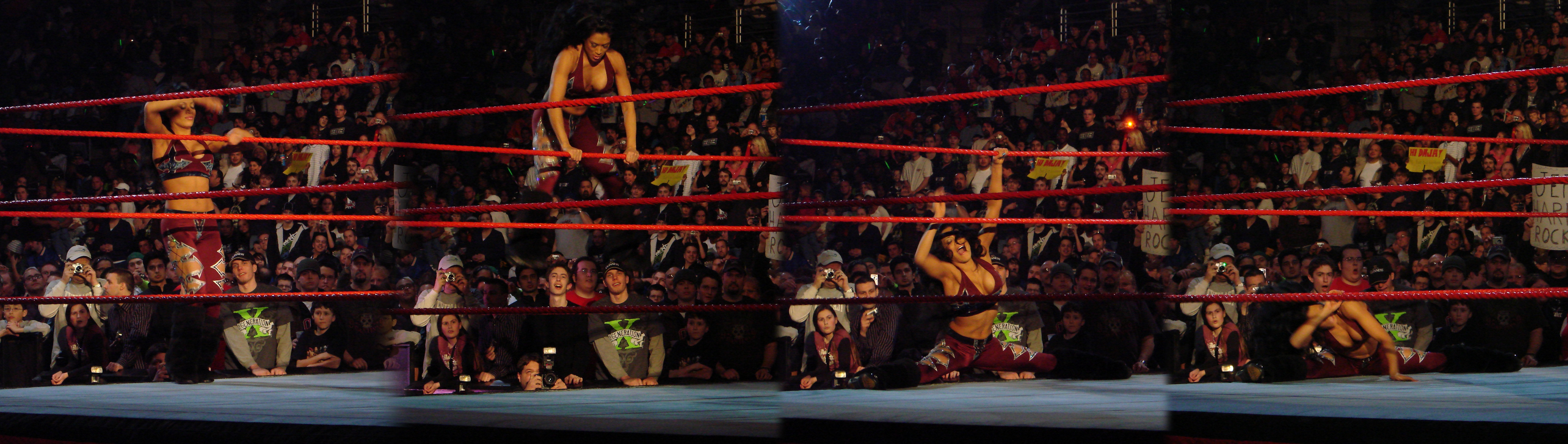
Melina Perez performs a split in order to enter into the ring. This is one of the signature things this wrestler does while doing her entrance.

While the wrestling matches themselves are the primary focus of professional wrestling, a key dramatic element of the business can be entrances of the wrestlers to the arena and ring. It is typical for a wrestler to get their biggest crowd reaction (or "pop") for their ring entrance, rather than for anything they do in the wrestling match itself, especially if former main event stars are returning to a promotion after a long absence.

All notable wrestlers now enter the ring accompanied by music and regularly add other elements to their entrance. The music played during the ring entrance will usually mirror the wrestler's personality. Many wrestlers, particularly in the United States, have music and lyrics specially written for their ring entrance. While invented long before, the practice of including music with the entrance gained rapid popularity during the 1980s, largely as a result of the huge success of Hulk Hogan and the WWF, and their Rock 'n' Wrestling Connection. When a match is won, the victor's theme music is usually also played in celebration.

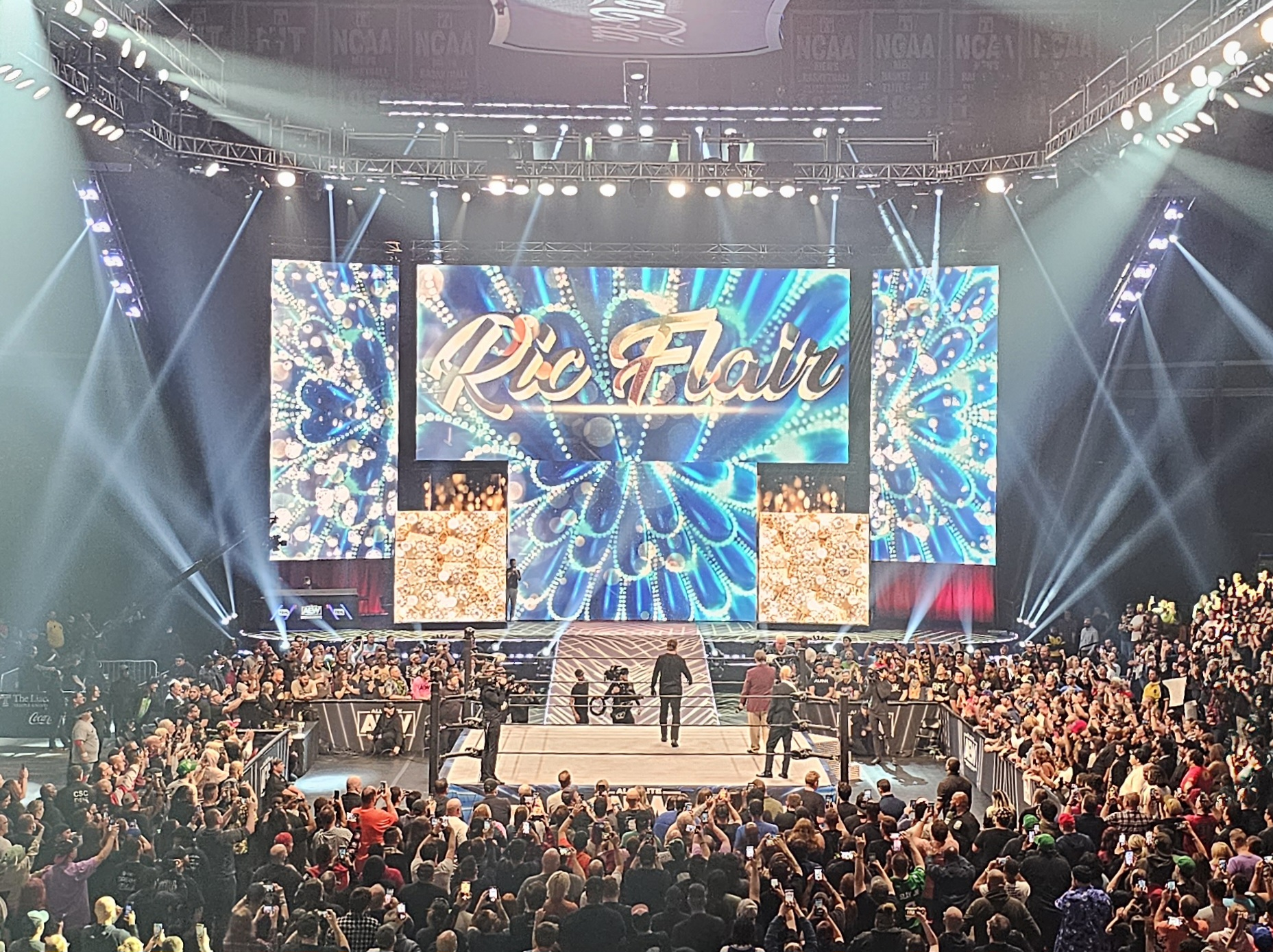
Ric Flair's entrance video plays on the screen during his AEW debut.

Because wrestling is predetermined, a wrestler's entrance music will play as they enter the arena, even if they are, in kayfabe, not supposed to be there. For example, in 2012 through 2014, The Shield was a trio of wrestlers who were (in kayfabe) not at the time under contract with WWE (hence their gimmick of entering the ring through the crowd), but they still had entrance music which was played whenever they entered the arena, despite the fact that they were kayfabe invaders. With the introduction of the Titantron entrance screen in 1997, WWF wrestlers also had entrance videos play along with their music. Other dramatic elements of a ring entrance can include:

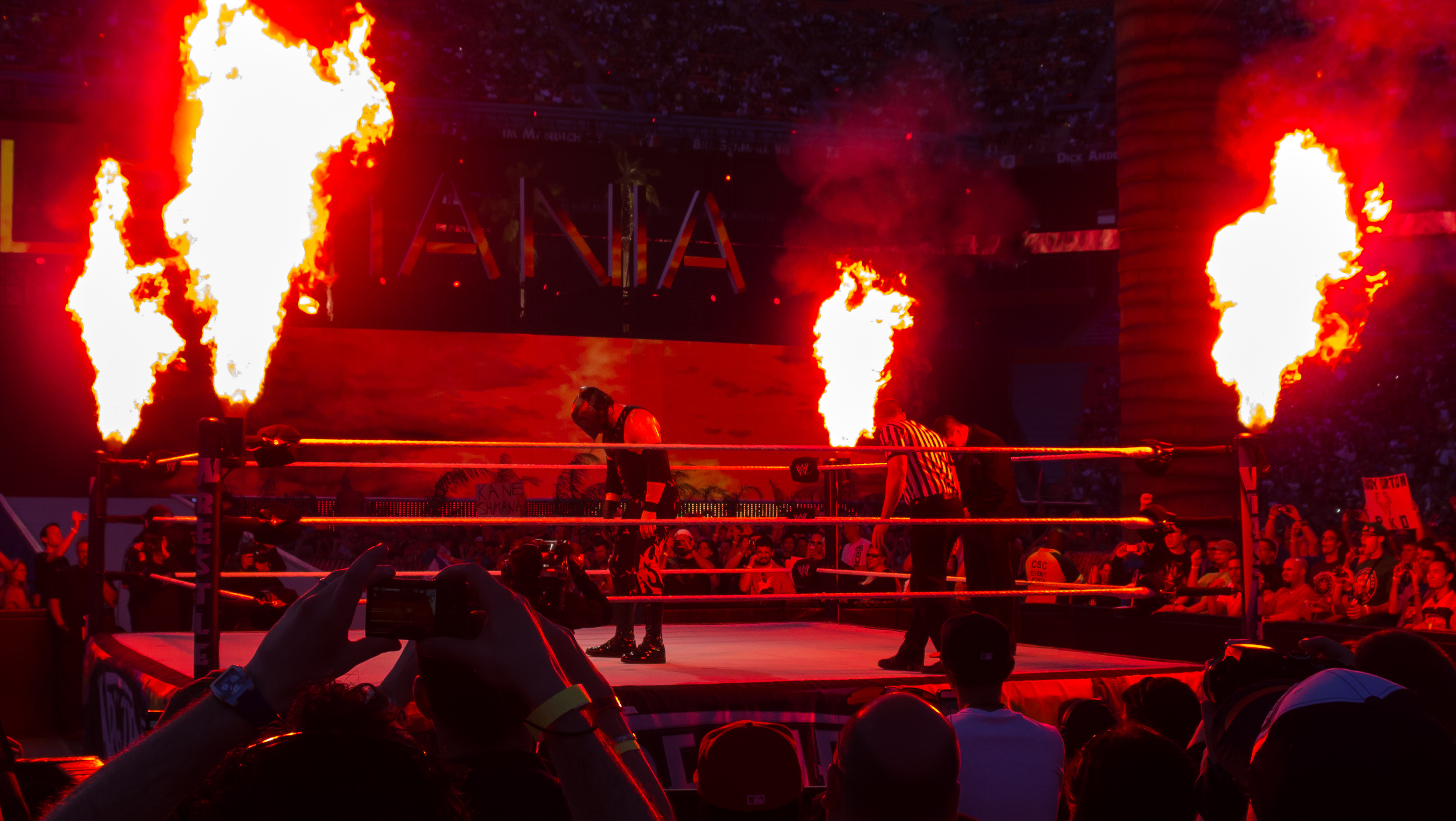
Kane is known for using fire pyrotechnics in his ring entrance.

- Pyrotechnics such as a ring of fire for The Brood when they ascend to the stage, multi-colour fireworks (most notably for Edge), fire for Kane and Seth Rollins, a stage of smoke for Finn Bálor and (for a short period of time) falling fireworks for Christian Cage.
- Additional visual graphics or staging props to complement the entrance video/routine or further emphasize the character. For instance, Kane's entrance graphics employ heavy use of fire-themed visuals, The Undertaker's entrance features dark lighting, fire, fog and dry ice, and lightning-themed effects, and Goldust has been known to use on-screen visual effects in his entrance to simulate the presentation of a feature film (i.e. widescreen, production company credits), as to emphasize his Hollywood-themed film aficionado character. Adam Page's nameplate is usually accompanied by humorous sub-headings such as "Anxious Millennial Cowboy", "New Boot Goofin'", or "Finally Showed Up to Work".
- A distinct sound or opening note in the music (used to elicit a Pavlovian response from the crowd). For example, the glass shattering in Steve Austin's entrance theme, The Undertaker's signature bell toll, sirens, such as used by Scott Steiner or Right to Censor, CM Punk's static sound, Bret Hart's electric guitar stinger, the NYSE trading bell and a cow's moo in JBL's theme.
- Darkening of the arena, often accompanied by mood lighting or strobe lighting, such as in The Undertaker's, Triple H's, or Sting's entrances. Certain colors of lighting have been associated with specific wrestlers; for instance, blue lighting for The Undertaker and Alexa Bliss, green lighting for Triple H, D-Generation X, and Shane McMahon, a mixture of red and yellow lighting for Brock Lesnar, a mixture of red and orange lighting for Kane, multicolored lighting for John Morrison, gold lighting for Goldust, pink lighting for Val Venis and Trish Stratus, and so forth.
- Driving a vehicle into the arena. For example, Eddie Guerrero arrived in a lowrider, The Undertaker (in his "American Bad Ass" biker gimmick), Chuck Palumbo, Tara, and the Disciples of Apocalypse on motorcycles, The Mexicools on riding lawn mowers, JBL in his limousine, Alberto Del Rio arriving into the arena in various luxury cars, Steve Austin driving an all-terrain vehicle, and Camacho and Hunico entering on a lowrider bicycle. Darby Allin in similar fashion rides a skateboard down to the ring, which is occasionally used as a weapon if the match type permits.
- Talking to the crowd using a distinctive patter. For instance, chanting or rapping along with the music (i.e. Road Dogg, R-Truth). Another example is Vickie Guerrero entering to no music, but announcing her arrival with the words "Excuse me!". The Acclaimed's Max Caster will perform a freestyle rap, usually at the expense of the opponent or a real life figure that has been brought up in recent news.
- Alternative forms of announcing one's entrance. Orange Cassidy, whose persona is a carefree individual, has his weight billed as "whatever", and being billed from "wherever". In similar fashion, Danhausen has been billed as "claiming to stand 6 ft 7 in. tall, and over 300 lbs", despite being nowhere near either of those statistics. Mr. Kennedy would enter with his theme music, but would notably have a microphone descend from the ceiling when he reached the ring, where he would announce himself, rather than the traditional announcer. Maxwell Jacob Friedman during his heel persona would occasionally have the announcer begrudgingly announce him as "He's better than you, and you know it...", generally after a large victory for the character, or being surrounded by henchman of his that threaten to harm the announcer if they do not read off the card verbatim.
- Many heels with narcissistic gimmicks (Lex Luger, Shawn Michaels, Cody Rhodes, Paul Orndorff, etc.) admired themselves in mirrors on their way to the ring.
- Coming through the audience, such as The Sandman's beer drinking and can smashing entrance, The Shield's walk through the crowd via the arena steps, or Jon Moxley making his way to the ring from the corridors.
- Accompaniment by a ringside crew or personal security, as Goldberg did.
- Entering the arena by a lift in the stage, such as Kurt Angle, The Brood and Rey Mysterio.

Special ring entrances are also developed for big occasions, most notably the WrestleMania event. For example, WrestleMania III and VI both saw all wrestlers enter the arena on motorized miniature wrestling rings. Live bands are sometimes hired to perform live entrance music at special events. John Cena and Triple H are particularly notable in recent years for their highly theatrical entrances at WrestleMania.

== Training and qualifications ==
Physical fitness is considered the minimum requirement for entry in the field, with most professional wrestlers having at least some athletic background or training. Professional wrestlers receive at least some formal training in specialized professional wrestling schools or academies; these institutions can be independent or associated with a specific promotion. Candidates are typically trained and coached by experienced professional wrestlers; training regimens encompass both the athletic and performative aspects of professional wrestling, including physical fitness, choreography, and dramatization. Trainees are often pitted against one another or with their instructors in matches before small crowds to demonstrate and refine their skill in improvisation, mock combat, and stage presence.

=== Occupational hazards ===
Professional wrestling has been characterized by endemic and widespread health risks from its very inception in the 19th century. Although matches have predetermined results, the inherently physical nature of the performances, combined with an emphasis on spectacle and showmanship, results in a high chance of injury and even death. Strikes are often stiff, especially in Japan, and in independent wrestling promotions such as Combat Zone Wrestling. The ring is often made out of 2-by-12-inch (5 by 30 cm) timber planks. There have been many brutal accidents, hits and injuries. Injuries are commonly sustained on the shoulders, knees, back, neck, and ribs. Professional wrestler Davey Richards said in 2015, "We train to take damage, we know we are going to take damage and we accept that."

Occupational hazards have been attributed to professional wrestling's uniquely ambiguous nature—as neither a true sport nor a formal performing art, yet still some combination of the two—which makes it difficult to regulate; as noted by Claire Warden, Professor of Performance and Physical Culture at Loughborough University, "Set up a rugby club tomorrow and the Rugby Football Union would soon be knocking on your door to ask about concussion protocol or safeguarding. Set up a wrestling school or promotion and, well, no-one will demand anything." Warden also identifies related issues and practices in the industry, such as inadequate health and safety provisions among promotions, lack of unionization or labor representation, and the fact that most professional wrestlers are employed as independent contractors, thereby typically lacking healthcare access while remaining economically precarious.

Some wrestling performers use steroids and suffer from associated health issues. In 2007, American Congressman Cliff Stearns noted that between 1985 and 2006, 89 performers had died under the age of 50. Chronic traumatic encephalopathy (CTE), a brain disorder often caused by repeated concussions and head injury, may have been a factor in the 2007 double homicide committed by wrestler Chris Benoit. A 2014 study of male professional wrestlers active between 1985 and 2011 found a "very high premature mortality rate" compared to the general population; cardiovascular disease was by far the leading cause, while deaths related to drug overdoses and cancer were likewise substantially high, at 122.7 and 6.4 times greater than the general population.

Wrestling performers frequently experience real pain during routine performances. Sociologist R. Tyson Smith attributes wrestlers' willingness to endure occupational injury to the substantivism of their socioeconomic viewpoint: From this viewpoint, Smith argues, wrestlers are willing to accept bodily pain by both practicing denialism and the sociologic embedded desire for authenticity, solidarity, and dominance. These findings are corroborated by the British-based "Health and Wellbeing in Professional Wrestling" project, which interviewed professional wrestlers and identified common risks such as "downplaying injury to secure that important spot on the card, performing a macho-masculine sense of resilience ... [and] acknowledging that there are always physical risks associated with contact sports."

== Regional variations and subgenres ==
The United States/Canada, northwest Europe (specifically the United Kingdom, Germany/Austria, and France), Japan, and Mexico are the four largest and most popular markets for professional wrestling and known for their distinctive styles and independent development. Professional wrestling in the United States, which overlaps into Canada, tends to focus on history building and the establishment of characters and their personalities. There is a story for each match, merging into a narrative arc stretching across successive matches. Stories usually contain characters like faces, heels, and—less often—"tweeners" providing character arc. It is a "triumph" if the face wins and a "tragedy" if the heel wins. American wrestling features intense narrative conflict between faces and heels, with the heels sometimes attacking the faces during TV interviews. The relationship between different characters can also be complex, with sharp and strong personalities providing an element of literary verisimilitude.

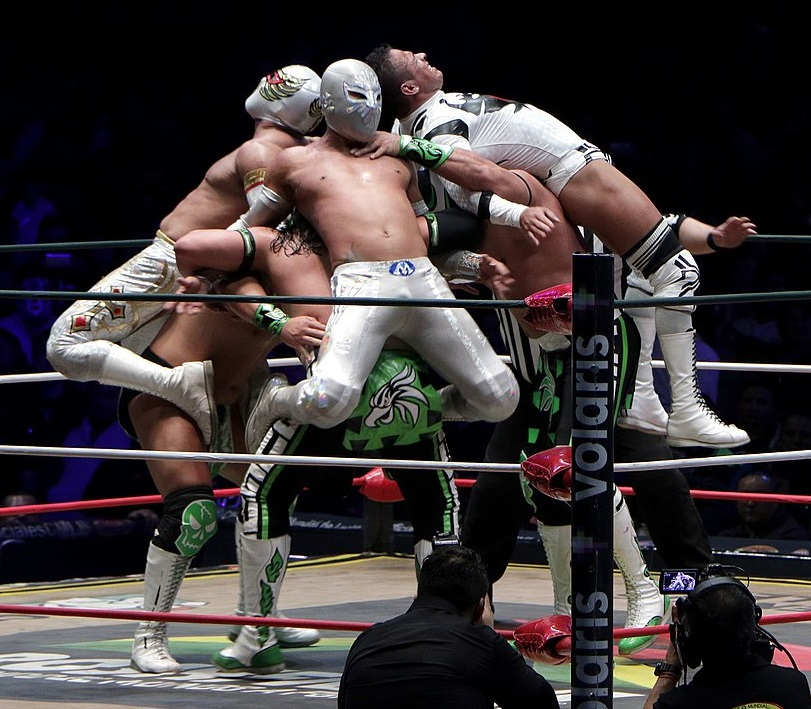
The Mexican wrestlers Gran Guerrero, Último Guerrero, and Euforia performing a triple team move on their opponents

In Mexican professional wrestling, or lucha libre, places less emphasis on narrative development. Mexican professional wrestling tradition repeats very usually brutal tactics, specially more aerial holds than professional wrestlers in the U.S. who, more often, rely on power moves and strikes to subdue their opponents. The difference in styles is due to the independent evolution of the sport in Mexico beginning in the 1930s and the fact that wrestlers in the cruiserweight division (Spanish: peso semicompleto) are often the most popular wrestlers in Mexican lucha libre. Wrestlers often execute high flying moves characteristic of lucha libre by utilizing the wrestling ring's ropes to catapult themselves towards their opponents, using intricate combinations in rapid-fire succession, and applying complex submission holds. Lucha libre is also known for its tag team wrestling matches, in which the teams are often made up of three members, instead of two as is common in the U.S.

Japanese professional wrestling (puroresu) also developed distinctively, initially drawing from traditional American style wrestling and becoming an entity in itself. Although matches are predetermined, the psychology and presentation of performances differ markedly: Among the largest promotions, such as New Japan Pro-Wrestling, All Japan Pro Wrestling, and Pro Wrestling Noah, professional wrestling is treated as a full contact sport that mixes hard hitting martial arts strikes with shoot style submission holds, whilst in the U.S. it is rather more regarded as an entertainment show. Wrestlers incorporate kicks and strikes from martial arts disciplines, and a strong emphasis is placed on submission wrestling, and unlike the use of involved storylines in the U.S., Japanese storylines are not as intricate, with emphasis on the concept of "fighting spirit" via displays of physical and mental stamina. Many of Japan's wrestlers including top stars such as Shinya Hashimoto, Riki Chōshū and Keiji Mutoh came from a legitimate martial arts background and many Japanese wrestlers in the 1990s began to pursue careers in mixed martial arts organizations such as Pancrase and Shooto which at the time retained the original look of puroresu but were actual competitions. Other companies, such as Michinoku Pro Wrestling and Dragon Gate, wrestle in a style similar to Mexican companies like AAA and CMLL. This is known as "Lucharesu".

Much of the more serious style of Japanese wrestling derives from wrestling in Europe, particularly traditional British wrestling, which strongly emphasizes pure technical skill (particularly chain sequences of counters/reversals/escapes from holds) and high proportion of clean sportsmanly scientific matches between two "blue-eyes" as babyfaces were called there. This spread across mainland Europe (where it was known as "Catch" in non-English speaking countries) but in the Mediterranean south it soon died out after an initial flush of popularity, with the major league promotions of Italy and Spain closing in 1965 and 1986 respectively and Greece's annual stadium show last held in 1980 although some low-grade house shows limped on until 1991. This left the United Kingdom, France, and West Germany/Austria as the three strongholds of European wrestling by the 1980s. In Germany and Austria, wrestling shows—particularly major trophy tournaments in Graz, Hamburg, Bremen, Vienna, and other cities featuring visiting wrestlers from around the world—were a key part of the celebrations of various cultural festivals. Longtime CWA World Heavyweight Champion and promoter Otto Wanz maintained strong links with American promotions, frequently importing American talent and even briefly winning the AWA World Heavyweight Championship in 1982.

Meanwhile, in both the United Kingdom and France, national television coverage from the 1950s to the late 1980s made household names of top stars. In the United Kingdom in the late 1970s and through the 1980s, the dominant Joint Promotions underwent a major boom by rebranding as family entertainment centred around superheavyweight lead blue-eye Big Daddy. Eventually however the sheer lopsided nature of his victories over heels alienated fellow wrestlers and adult fans alike to the point where both groups defected in droves to opposition promoter All Star Wrestling which expanded (taking a share of the final two years of TV coverage) until it eclipsed Joint as dominant promotion, a position it still holds in 2026. During the same period, professional wrestling in France moved to a more acrobatic style of action and colourful gimmick-led presentation, as exemplified by lead babyface Flesh Gordon (Gerard Hervé) who had learned his craft in 1970s Mexico. By the beginning of the 1990s in all three countries, local styles of wrestling were largely supplanted in mainstream popular culture by the WWF and WCW. While the traditional styles survive at grassroots level they face stiff competition not only from the major American wrestling corporations but also from homegrown "American style" promotions conforming to the general pattern of the contemporary U.S. independent wrestling scene.

=== Women's wrestling ===
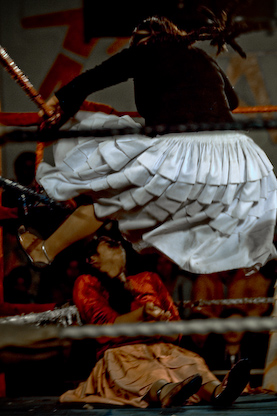
The Fighting Cholitas in Bolivia

The women's division of professional wrestling has maintained a recognized world champion since 1937, when Mildred Burke won the original World Women's title. She then formed the World Women's Wrestling Association in the early 1950s and recognized herself as the first champion, although the championship was vacated upon her retirement in 1956. The NWA ceased to acknowledge Burke as the Women's World champion in 1954 and instead acknowledged June Byers as champion after a controversial finish to a high-profile match between Burke and Byers that year. Upon Byers's retirement in 1964, The Fabulous Moolah, who won a junior heavyweight version of the NWA World Women's Championship (the predecessor to the WWE Women's Championship) in a tournament back in 1958, was recognized by most NWA promoters as champion by default.

=== Intergender ===
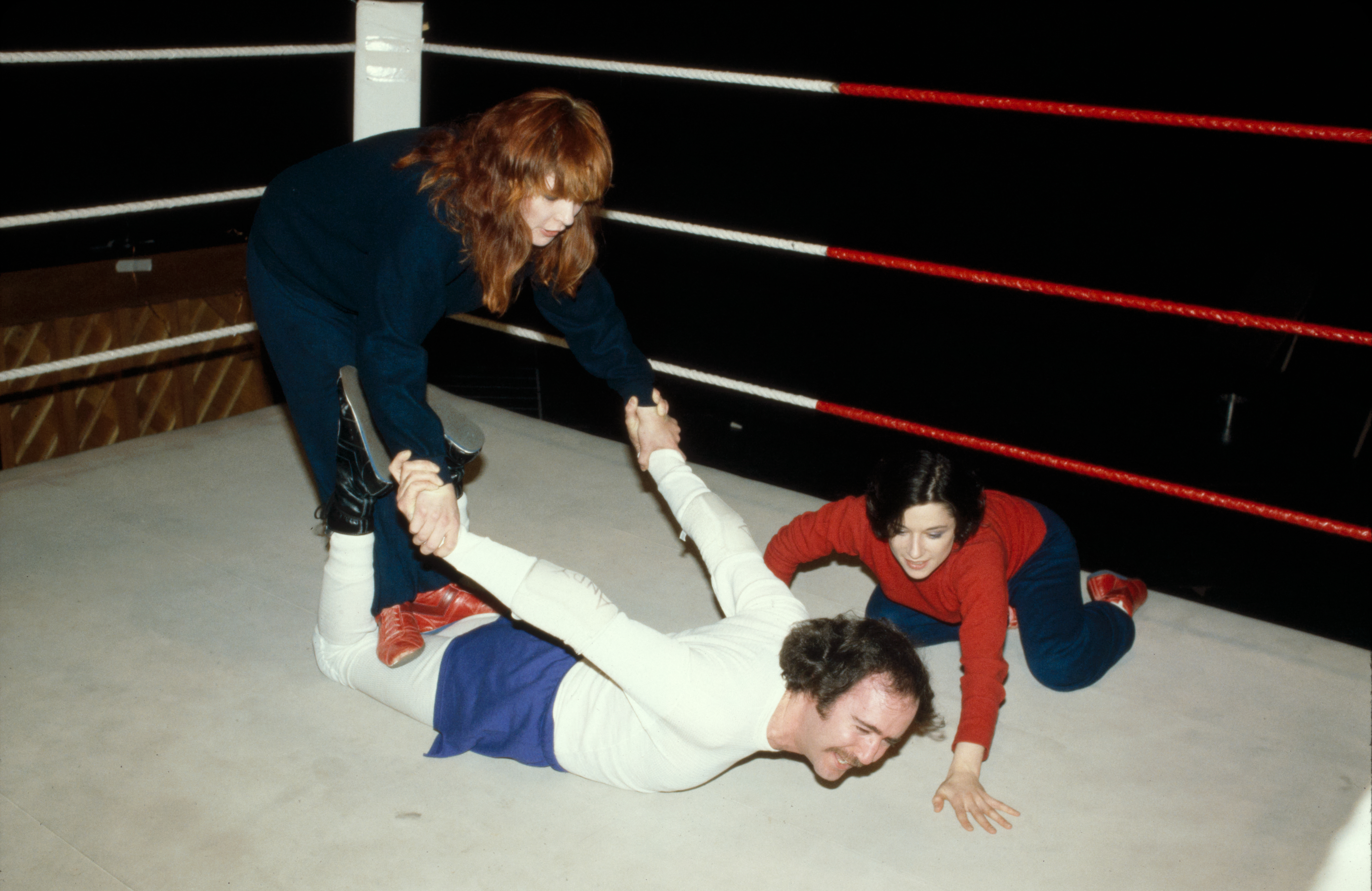
Comedian Andy Kaufman became notorious in professional wrestling for his matches against women.

For most of its history, men and women rarely worked against each other in professional wrestling, as it was deemed to be unfair and unchivalrous. Andy Kaufman used this to gain notoriety when he created an Intergender Championship and declared it open to any female challenger. This led to a long (worked) feud with Jerry Lawler. Cathy Davis sued the New York State Athletic Commission (NYSAC) in 1977 because she was denied a boxing license because she was a woman, and the case was decided in her favor later that year, with the judge invalidating New York State rule number 205.15, which stated, "No woman may be licensed as a boxer or second or licensed to compete in any wrestling exhibition with men." In his opinion the judge cited the precedent set by Garrett v. New York State Athletic Commission (1975), which "found the regulation invalid under the equal protection clauses of the State and Federal Constitutions". The NYSAC filed an appeal of the ruling but later dropped it.

In the 1980s, mixed tag team matches began to take place, with a male and female on each team and a rule stating that each wrestler could only attack the opponent of the same gender. If a tag was made, the other team had to automatically switch their legal wrestler as well. Despite these restrictions, many mixed tag matches do feature some physical interaction between participants of different genders. For example, a heel may take a cheap shot at the female wrestler of the opposing team to draw a negative crowd reaction. In lucha libre, cheap shots and male-female attacks are not uncommon. Intergender singles bouts were first fought on a national level in the 1990s. This began with Luna Vachon, who faced men in Extreme Championship Wrestling (ECW) and WWF. Later, Chyna became the first female to hold a belt that was not exclusive to women when she won the WWF Intercontinental Championship. Intergender wrestling was uncommon in Impact Wrestling. ODB, had participated in intergender matches and once held the Impact Knockouts Tag Team Championship with Eric Young for a record 478 days. Other notable Impact Knockouts that competed in intergender matches include Scarlett Bordeaux; Tessa Blanchard, who became the first woman to win the Impact World Championship; and Jordynne Grace, who became the inaugural Impact Digital Media Championship.

=== Midget wrestling ===
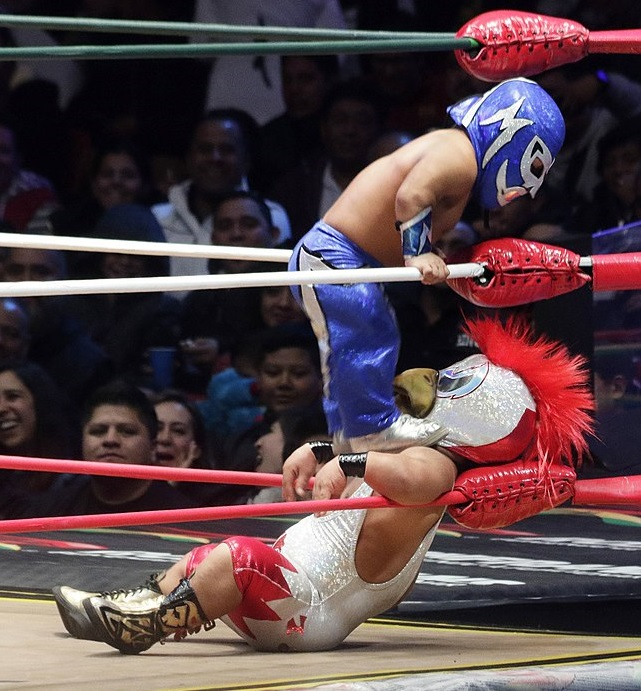
Mexican midget wrestlers Microman (in blue) and Zacarías el Perico during a match

Midget wrestling can be traced to professional wrestling's carnival and vaudeville origins. In recent years, the popularity and prevalence of midgets in wrestling has greatly decreased due to wrestling companies depriving midget divisions of storyline or feud. WWE has made a few attempts to enter this market with their "minis" in the 1990s and the "junior's league" as recent as 2006. It is still a popular form of entertainment in Mexican wrestling, mostly as a "sideshow".

Some wrestlers may have their own specific "mini me", like Mascarita Sagrada, Alebrije has Quije, etc. There are also cases in which midgets can become valets for a wrestler, and even get physically involved in matches, like Alushe, who often accompanies Tinieblas, or KeMonito, who is portrayed as Consejo Mundial de Lucha Libre's mascot and is also a valet for Mistico. Dave Finlay was often aided in his matches by a midget known mainly as Hornswoggle while in WWE, who hid under the ring and gave a shillelagh to Finlay to use on his opponent. Finlay also occasionally threw him at his opponents. Hornswoggle was given a run with the WWE Cruiserweight Championship and feuded with D-X in 2009.

== Culture and sociology ==
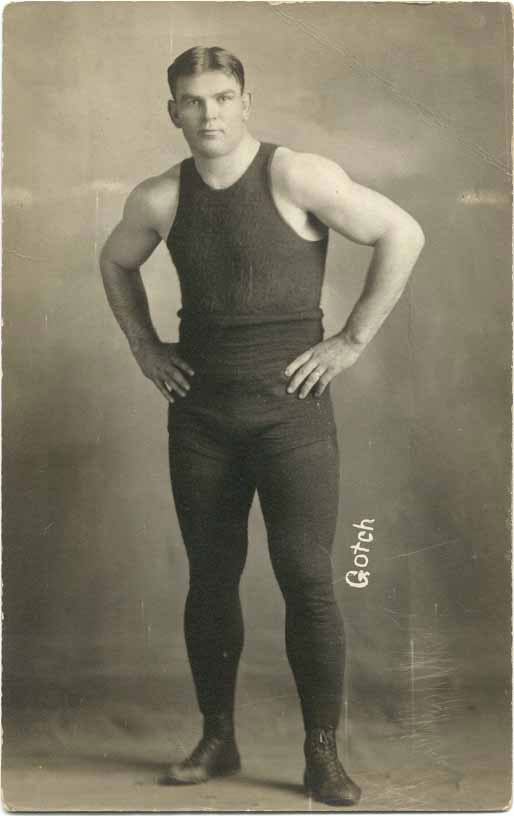
Frank Gotch, 20th-century professional wrestling pioneer

Professional wrestling has developed its own unique culture among both spectators and performers. Professional wrestlers have developed a kind of global fraternity, with familial bonds, shared language, and passed-down traditions. New performers are expected to "pay their dues" for a few years by working in lower-profile promotions and working as ring crew before working their way upward. The permanent rosters of most promotions develop a backstage pecking order, with veterans mediating conflicts and mentoring younger wrestlers. For many decades and still to a lesser extent in the early 21st century, performers were expected to keep the illusions of wrestling's legitimacy alive even while not performing, essentially acting in character any time they were in public. Some veterans speak of a "sickness" among wrestling performers, an inexplicable pull to remain active in the wrestling world despite the devastating effects the job can have on one's life and health.

Fans of professional wrestling likewise have their own subculture, comparable to those of science fiction, video games, or comic books. Like sports fans, many enthusiasts not only attend and view events but take an active interest in backstage occurrences, future storylines, and reasonings behind company decisions; they are catered to by a large and diverse industry of newsletters written by journalists with insider ties to the wrestling industry. Known in the subculture as "rags" or "dirt sheets", these sources have proliferated online and sometimes provide breaking news; some have expanded into radio shows.

Some fans enjoy collecting recordings of wrestling shows from specific companies, of certain wrestlers, or of specific genres. Since the 1990s, many companies have been founded which deal primarily in wrestling footage. When the WWE purchased both WCW and ECW in 2001, they also obtained the entire past video libraries of both productions and have released many past matches online and on home video. Additionally, the internet has exposed fans to previously unavailable variations of wrestling from around the world.

As in competitive sports, fantasy leagues have developed around professional wrestling. Some take this concept further by creating E-feds (electronic federations), where a user can create their own fictional wrestling character, and role-playing storylines with other users, leading to scheduled "shows" where match results are determined by the organizers, usually based on a combination of the characters' statistics and the players' roleplaying aptitude, sometimes with audience voting.

=== Mainstream popularity ===
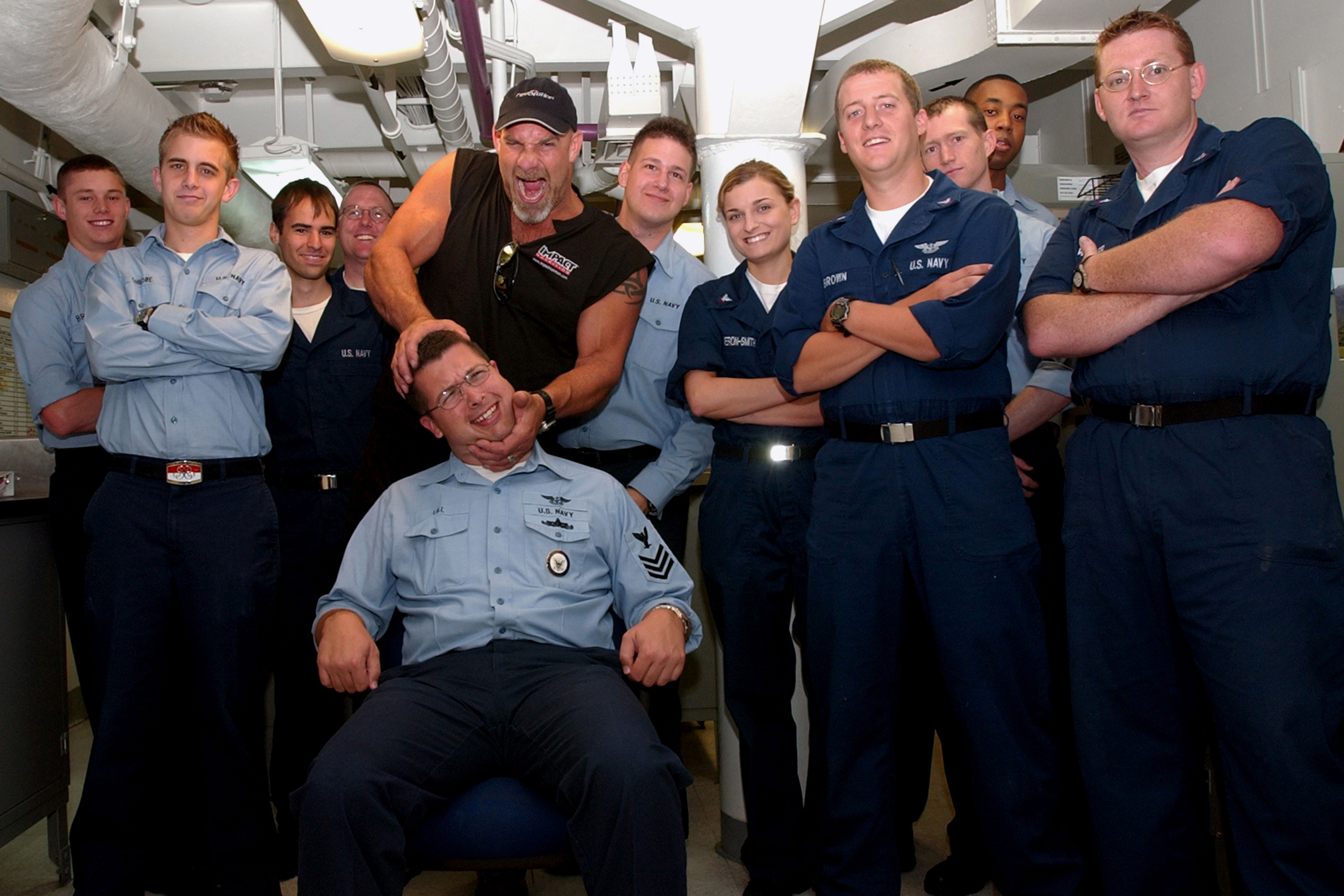
Bill Goldberg during his tour of USS Ronald Reagan

From the first established world championship, the top professional wrestlers have garnered fame within mainstream society. Each successive generation has produced a number of wrestlers who extend their careers into the realms of music, acting, writing, business, politics or public speaking, and are known to those who are unfamiliar with wrestling in general. Conversely, celebrities from other sports or general pop culture also become involved with wrestling for brief periods of time. A prime example of this is The Rock 'n' Wrestling Connection of the 1980s, which combined wrestling with MTV.

Professional wrestling is often portrayed within other works using parody, and its general elements have become familiar tropes and memes in American culture. Some terminology originating in professional wrestling has found its way into the common vernacular. Phrases such as "body slam", "sleeper hold" and "tag team" are used by those who do not follow professional wrestling. The term "smackdown", popularized by The Rock and SmackDown! in the 1990s, has been included in Merriam-Webster dictionaries since 2007.

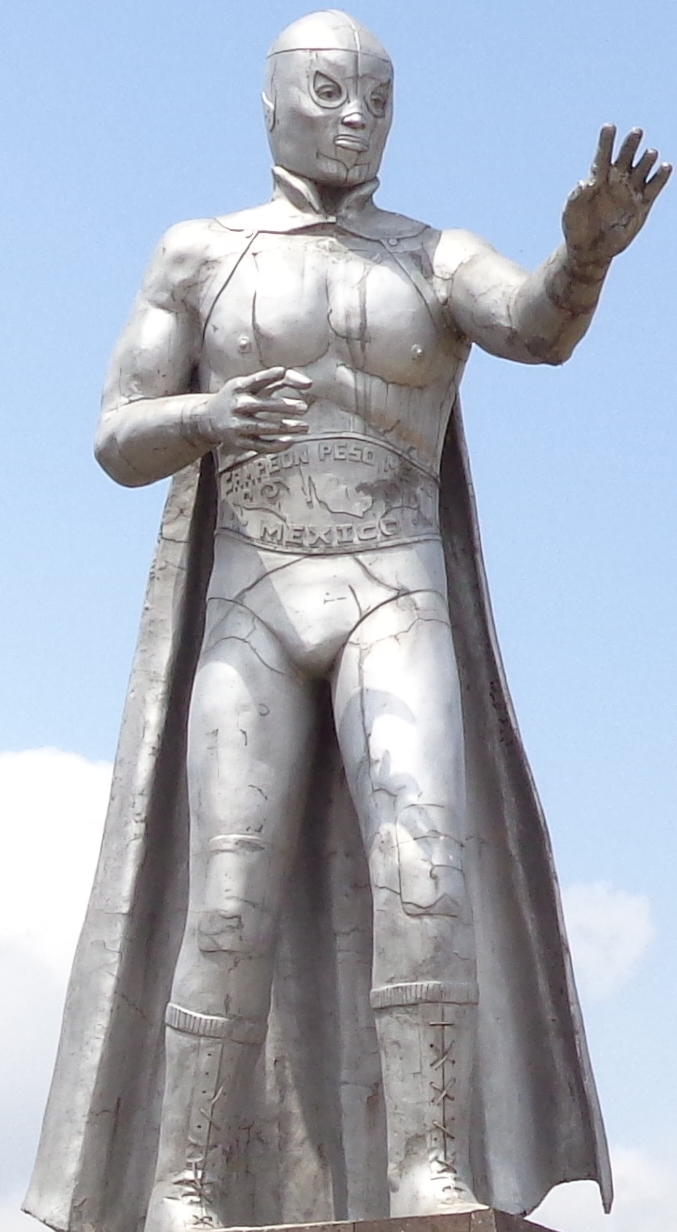
Mexican wrestler El Santo became a folk hero in that country and a statue of him stands in his home city of Tulancingo.

Many television shows and films have been produced which portray in-character professional wrestlers as protagonists, such as Ready to Rumble, ¡Mucha Lucha!, Nacho Libre, and the Santo film series. There have been multiple stage plays set in the world of pro wrestling: The Baron is a comedy that retells the life of an actual performer known as Baron von Raschke. From Parts Unknown... is an award-nominated Canadian drama about the rise and fall of a fictional wrestler. Trafford Tanzi is a play set in a wrestling ring and divided into ten rounds, in which all the cast members participate in wrestling. The Elaborate Entrance of Chad Deity is a dramatic comedy about a fictional wrestler, which involves scenes of professional wrestling that take place in a wrestling ring. Mythos: Ragnarök adapts Norse mythology for the stage by combining dramatic dialogue with scenes of professional wrestling, in the first example of wrestling being used as theatrical stage combat.

The 2009 South Park episode "W.T.F." played on the soap operatic elements of professional wrestling. One of the lead characters on the Disney Channel series Kim Possible was a huge fan of pro wrestling and actually featured it on an episode (with two former WWE wrestlers voicing the two fictitious wrestlers featured in the episode). The 2008 film The Wrestler, about a washed-up professional wrestler, garnered several Oscar nominations. The 2017 TV series GLOW, based on the Gorgeous Ladies of Wrestling promotion, gained critical acclaim, including a nomination for Outstanding Comedy Series at the 70th Primetime Emmy Awards.

The 1950 film noir Night and the City, directed by Jules Dassin and starring Richard Widmark and Gene Tierney, told the story of a promoter in London trying to make it big, and featured a match involving professional wrestler Stanislaus Zbyszko. The 2019 Fighting with My Family is a biographical sports comedy-drama film that depicts the career of English professional wrestler Paige. Walk Like A Panther is 2018 British comedy film about a group of 1980s wrestlers staging one final show to raise money to save their pub. Many professional wrestlers have also become mainstream in their own right, including John Cena, Dave Bautista, and Dwayne "The Rock" Johnson, mainly for acting in major films, as well as Chris Jericho and "Macho Man" Randy Savage for their musical ventures. Wrestling has also gained a major following on YouTube, with WWE being the most subscribed wrestling channel and sixth most subscribed channel in the world. Other promotions, such as All Elite Wrestling, Major League Wrestling, Impact Wrestling and the National Wrestling Alliance have distributed their own weekly programming on the platform.

==== Measures of popularity ====
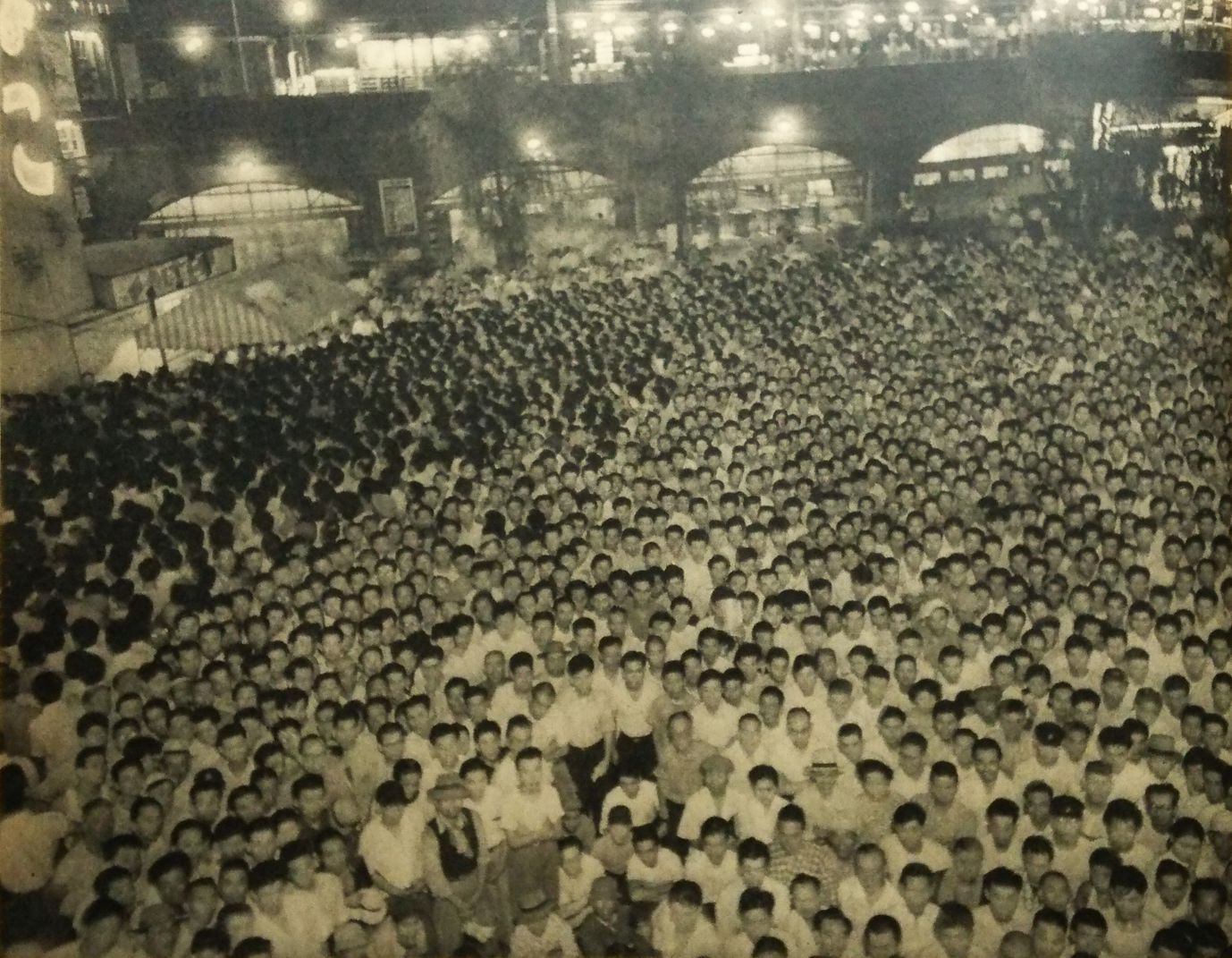
A crowd gathers to watch a Rikidōzan match in 1955.

Professional wrestling has become especially prominent in North America, Japan and Europe (especially the United Kingdom). In Brazil, there was a very popular wrestling television program that aired from the 1960s to the early 1980s called Telecatch. High-profile figures in the sport have become celebrities and even cultural icons in their home countries. Although professional wrestling started out as a small sideshow in traveling circuses and carnivals, today it is a multi-billion-dollar industry. Revenue is drawn from ticket sales, network television broadcasts, pay-per-view broadcasts, branded merchandise and home video.

Wrestling was instrumental in making pay-per-view a viable method of content delivery. Annual shows such as WrestleMania, All In, Bound for Glory, Wrestle Kingdom and formerly Starrcade are among the highest-selling pay-per-view programming each year. In modern day, internet programming has been utilized by a number of companies to air web shows, internet pay per views (IPPVs) or on-demand content, helping to generate internet-related revenue earnings from the evolving World Wide Web. Home video sales dominate the Billboard charts Recreational Sports DVD sales, with wrestling holding anywhere from 3 to 9 of the top 10 spots every week.

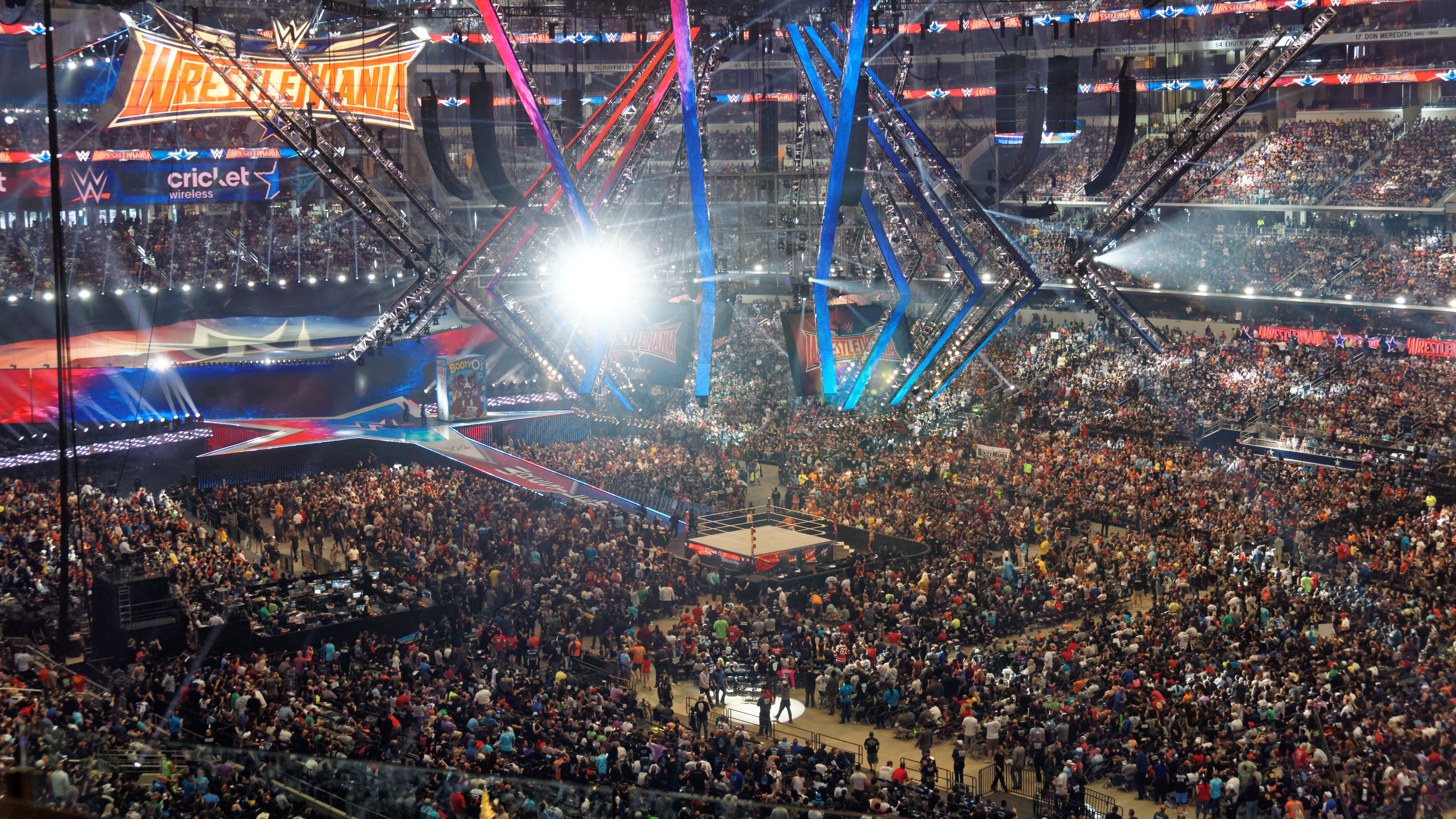
AT&T Stadium during WrestleMania 32. WWE claims a record attendance of 101,763 for the event.

Due to its persistent cultural presence and to its novelty within the performing arts, wrestling constitutes a recurring topic in both academia and the media. Several documentaries have been produced looking at professional wrestling, most notably Beyond the Mat directed by Barry W. Blaustein, and Wrestling with Shadows featuring retired wrestler Bret Hart and directed by Paul Jay. There have also been many fictional depictions of wrestling; the 2008 film The Wrestler received several Oscar nominations and began a career revival for its star Mickey Rourke. The largest professional wrestling company worldwide is the United States–based WWE, which bought out many smaller regional companies in the late 20th century, as well as primary competitors World Championship Wrestling (WCW) and ECW in early 2001. Other major companies worldwide include All Elite Wrestling (AEW) in the United States, Consejo Mundial de Lucha Libre (CMLL), and Lucha Libre AAA Worldwide (AAA) in Mexico; and New Japan Pro-Wrestling (NJPW), All Japan Pro Wrestling (AJPW), and Pro Wrestling Noah in Japan.

=== Study and analysis ===
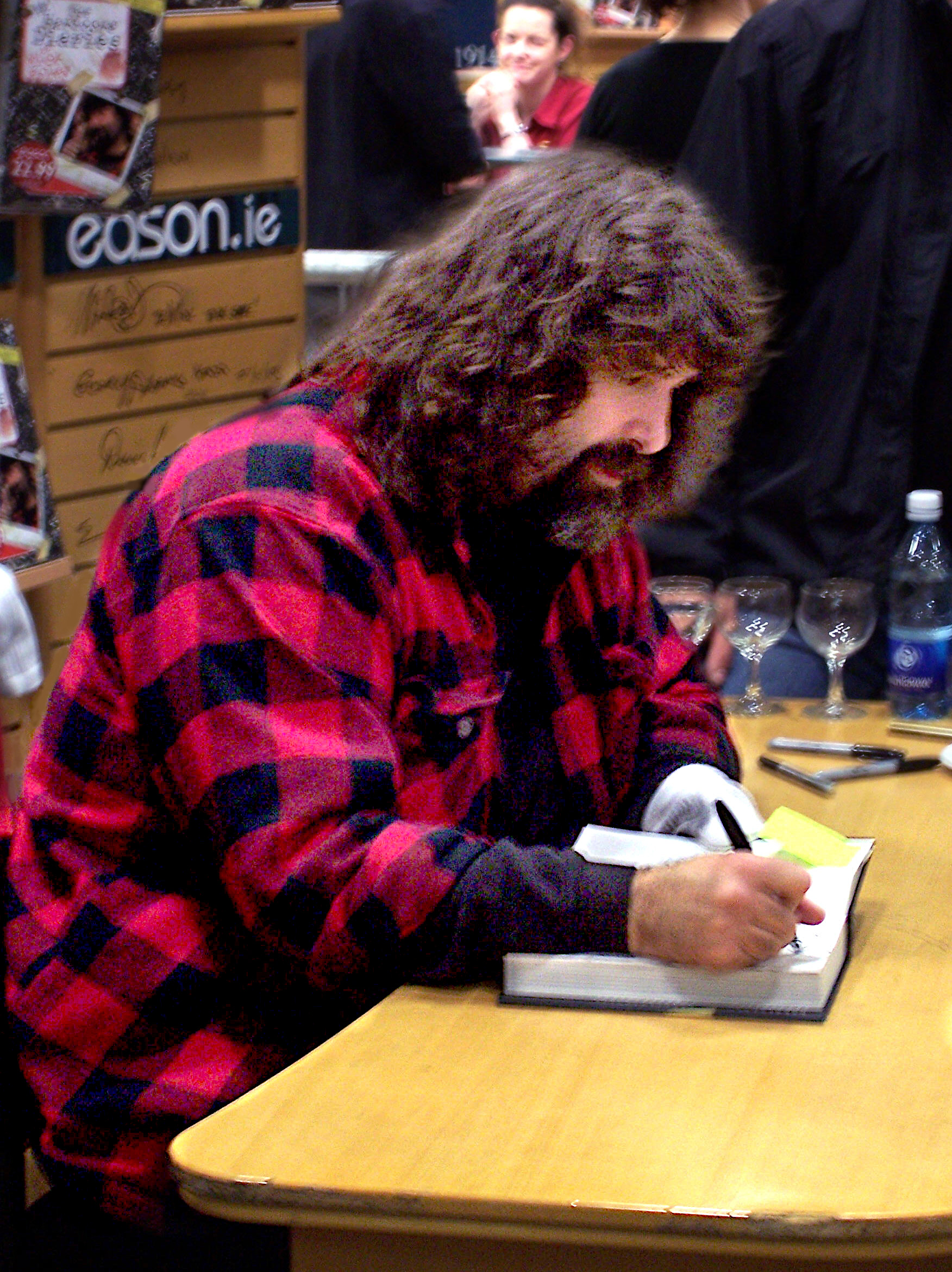
Mick Foley, who was one of the subjects of the Beyond the Mat documentary, became a New York Times best-selling author for his books about professional wrestling.

With its growing popularity, professional wrestling has attracted attention as a subject of serious academic study and journalistic criticism. Many courses, theses, essays and dissertations have analyzed wrestling's conventions, content, and its role in modern society. It is often included as part of studies on theater, sociology, performance, and media. The Massachusetts Institute of Technology developed a course of study on the cultural significance of professional wrestling, and anthropologist Heather Levi has written an ethnography about the culture of lucha libre in Mexico.

In the early 20th century, once it became apparent that the "sport" was worked, pro wrestling was looked down on as a cheap entertainment for the uneducated working class, an attitude that still exists to varying degrees today. The French theorist Roland Barthes was among the first to propose that wrestling was worthy of deeper analysis, in his essay "The World of Wrestling" from his book Mythologies, first published in 1957. Barthes argued that it should be looked at not as a scamming of the ignorant, but as spectacle; a mode of theatric performance for a willing, if bloodthirsty, audience. Wrestling is described as performed art which demands an immediate reading of the juxtaposed meanings. The logical conclusion is given least importance over the theatrical performers of the wrestlers and the referee. According to Barthes, the function of a wrestler is not to win: it is to go exactly through the motions which are expected of him and to give the audience a theatrical spectacle. This work is considered a foundation of all later study.

While pro wrestling is often described simplistically as a "soap opera for males", it has also been cited as filling the role of past forms of literature and theater; a synthesis of classical heroics, commedia dell'arte, revenge tragedies, morality plays, and burlesque. The characters and storylines portrayed by a successful promotion are seen to reflect the current mood, attitudes, and concerns of that promotion's society, and can in turn influence those same things. For example, wrestling's high levels of violence and masculinity make it a vicarious outlet for aggression during peacetime. The displays of masculinity are said to incorporate homoerotic elements and elements of pageantry that have been compared to drag or Ball culture; some scholars posit that the homoerotic undertones target the desires of ostensibly heterosexual male viewers, "[allowing] them the vicarious pleasure of transgressing gender norms" by identifying with "wrestlers who perform culturally transgressive notions of masculinity including flamboyance, attention to physical appearance, and ambiguous sexual identity". Beyond childhood, almost all fans recognize that professional wrestling is not a bonafide athletic contest. Nonetheless, Mazer argues that fans are drawn in by perception of authenticity, seeking to relive childhood aloofness.

The more insistent fans become in their exposes of wrestling's fakery, the more they look to experience the real. ... This phantom of the real is at the heart of professional wrestling's appeal.

— Sharon Mazer

Documentary filmmakers have studied the lives of wrestlers and the effects the profession has on them and their families. The 1999 theatrical documentary Beyond the Mat focused on Terry Funk, a wrestler nearing retirement; Mick Foley, a wrestler within his prime; Jake Roberts, a former star fallen from grace; and a school of wrestling students trying to break into the business. The 2005 release Lipstick and Dynamite, Piss and Vinegar: The First Ladies of Wrestling chronicled the development of women's wrestling throughout the 20th century. Pro wrestling has been featured several times on HBO's Real Sports with Bryant Gumbel. MTV's documentary series True Life featured two episodes titled "I'm a Professional Wrestler" and "I Want to Be a Professional Wrestler". Other documentaries have been produced by The Learning Channel (The Secret World of Professional Wrestling) and A&E (Hitman Hart: Wrestling with Shadows). Bloodstained Memoirs explored the careers of several pro wrestlers, including Chris Jericho, Rob Van Dam, and Roddy Piper.

== See also ==
=== Professional wrestling ===
- History of professional wrestling
- Independent circuit
- List of professional wrestling video games
- Professional wrestling moves (disambiguation)

=== Terminology ===
- Glossary of professional wrestling terms
- Professional wrestling match types
- Professional wrestling tag team match types
- Professional wrestling tournament

=== Lists of wrestlers ===
- List of family relations in professional wrestling
- List of professional wrestling rosters

=== Types of professional wrestling ===
- All-in professional wrestling
- Backyard wrestling
- Fantasy wrestling
- Hardcore wrestling
- Lucha libre
- Modern Freestyle Wrestling
- Puroresu

=== Related genres and topics ===
- 1950s quiz show scandals
- Scripted reality
- Docufiction

=== Radio programs ===
- Live Audio Wrestling
- Talksport
- Wrestling Observer Live

=== In fiction ===
- List of wrestling-based comic books
- GLOW
- The Wrestler
