= William Muldoon =

American wrestler (1852–1933)

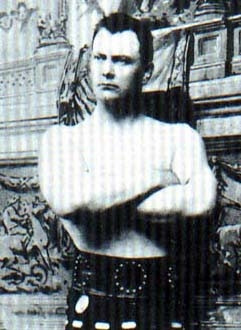
- Muldoon ca. 1885

Personal information
- Born: May 25, 1852 Caneadea, New York, U.S.
- Died: June 3, 1933 (aged 81) Purchase, New York, U.S.

Professional wrestling career
- Ring name: Bill Muldoon
- Billed height: 5 ft 10 in (178 cm)
- Billed weight: 192–212 lb (87–96 kg)
- Debut: 1870 (amateur); 1876 (semi-pro); 1881 (pro)
- Retired: March, 1890

William Muldoon (May 25, 1852 – June 3, 1933) was an American Greco-Roman wrestling champion, a physical culturist, and the first chairman of the New York State Athletic Commission. He once wrestled a match that lasted over seven hours.

Nicknamed "The Solid Man," Muldoon established himself as champion in Greco-Roman wrestling in the 1880s and over the years gained a remarkable measure of public influence that would continue through his days as a health farm proprietor in Westchester County and his service on NYSAC. Muldoon was a mainstay in New York sports for over 50 years.

== Early life ==
Born in Allegany County, New York, Muldoon was the son of Irish immigrants Patrick Muldoon and Maria Donahoe. His father was a farmer. Showing a knack for strength athletics at a young age, Muldoon gained a local reputation as a standout in caber-tossing, weightlifting, sprinting and amateur wrestling. His youth was otherwise characterized by a brutish, flash temper, and his desire to be treated with the respect of an adult despite being a child.

Muldoon journeyed to Paris to serve as a volunteer in the French Army in the Franco-Prussian War of 1870–71, where he met publisher James Gordon Bennett, Jr., who told Muldoon he had the potential to be the best Greco-Roman wrestler in the world if he concentrated on it.

By 1876, Muldoon was living in New York City, where he accepted appointment to the New York Police Department at the behest of Senator John Morrissey, former bare-knuckle boxing champion. At the time of his resignation in 1881, Muldoon was a detective.

== The Solid Man ==
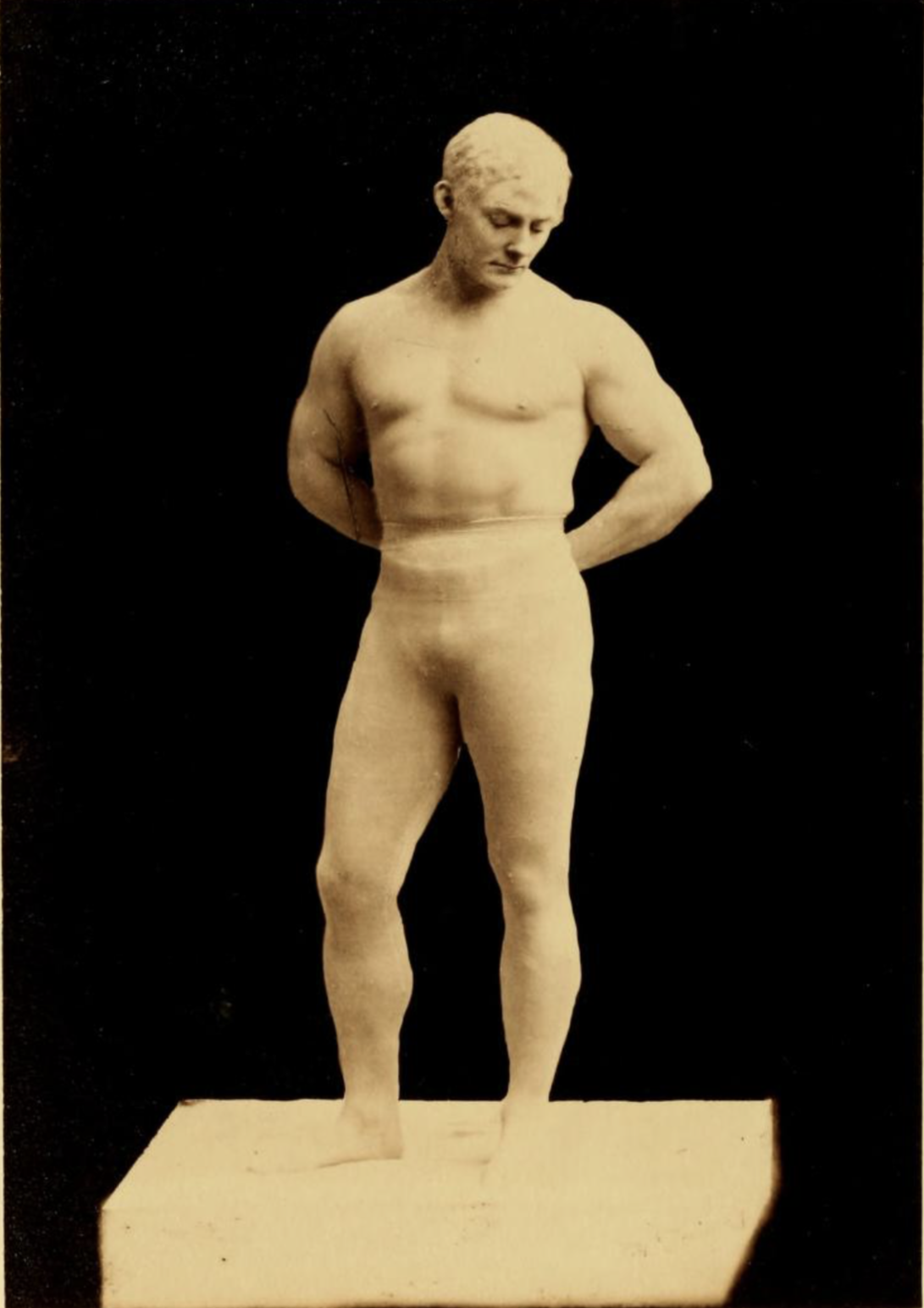
c. 1885 photograph of William Muldoon in a stage production.

In 1880, Muldoon gained recognition when he won the World Greco-Roman Heavyweight Championship with a win over title claimant Thiebaud Bauer. His rise to prominence brought challengers from across the globe, including Edwin Bibby and Tom Cannon of England, Donald Dinnie of Scotland, "Mat" Sorakichi of Japan, Carl Abs of Germany, William Miller of Australia, and John McMahon and Clarence Whistler, the latter being Muldoon's opponent in a titanic seven-hour match in 1881, where neither could gain a single fall.

Following the celebrated match with Whistler, Muldoon assembled an athletic combination and toured the country promoting athletic events and defending his title against all comers. Muldoon became involved in theater around this time, stemming from his fame in athletics. In 1883 he shared the bill with Maurice Barrymore, a boxer turned actor, in Madame Modjeska's production of Shakespeare's As You Like It. Barrymore played Orlando and Muldoon was Charles the Wrestler. In 1887, he appeared on Broadway as "The Fighting Gaul" in Spartacus.

Muldoon was one of a party of gentlemen entertained by Robert Emmet Odlum, brother of women's rights activist Charlotte Odlum Smith, on the morning of May 19, 1885, the day he jumped from the Brooklyn Bridge and was killed. Muldoon assisted in unsuccessful resuscitation efforts and summoned an ambulance, which arrived too late to save Odlum.

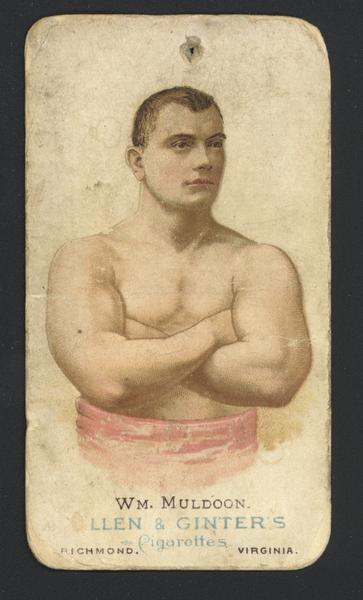
An 1887 "Allen & Ginter" tobacco card depicting Muldoon

In 1889 Muldoon trained John L. Sullivan for his famous 75-round fight against Jake Kilrain for the world heavyweight bare-knuckle boxing championship. He had done so on a friendly wager and offered to absorb expenses if Sullivan lost. Sullivan won and Muldoon gained national notice for restoring the boxing champion to fighting form. Muldoon's methods for accomplishing Sullivan's rejuvenation drew much public interest.

On May 28, Muldoon and Sullivan would have an exhibition wrestling bout contested under London Prize Ring Rules that ended on a 5–5 draw. The two would later have a three-round bout where Muldoon would lose the first but win the next two.

Muldoon was never defeated for his Greco-Roman Championship. He wrestled in his final championship match in 1890, defeating Evan Lewis in Philadelphia. Despite being implored by promoters and challengers to come out of retirement, Muldoon never wrestled another finish match or claimed any active championship. He symbolically passed his World Greco-Roman Heavyweight Championship to protégé Ernest Roeber (whom Lewis later defeated). Muldoon would make his final public appearance as a wrestler in a charity exhibition match against Roeber at Madison Square Garden in 1894.

That same year Muldoon moved his health farm from Belfast, New York, to White Plains. As he tapered off direct involvement in professional athletics, he devoted more time to devising his system on restoring one's health. Muldoon continued to train boxers and wrestlers until boxing was banned in New York at the turn of the century.

== Later years ==
In 1900, Muldoon opened what would become the work of his life, the well-known health institute The Olympia at Purchase, New York. In subsequent years through the success of the Olympia, Muldoon would again gain national notice as he treated such notables there as U.S. Ambassador to Great Britain Joseph Hodges Choate, publisher Ralph Pulitzer, Senator Chauncey Depew, Major General J. Franklin Bell, essayist Elbert Hubbard, novelist Theodore Dreiser and Secretary of State Elihu Root, who was sent to Muldoon by President Roosevelt. In 1907 there was talk that Muldoon would be appointed to the president's cabinet to oversee physical health. For his uncompromised methods at his health farm Muldoon was dubbed "the Professor". Journalist Nellie Bly was the first woman to complete Muldoon's course.

In the spring of 1909 Muldoon made a final return to the stage in a theatrical tour organized in benefit of The Lambs. Muldoon dedicated a Civil War monument to the town of Belfast, New York, listing the names of local veterans in 1915, including that of his older brother John.

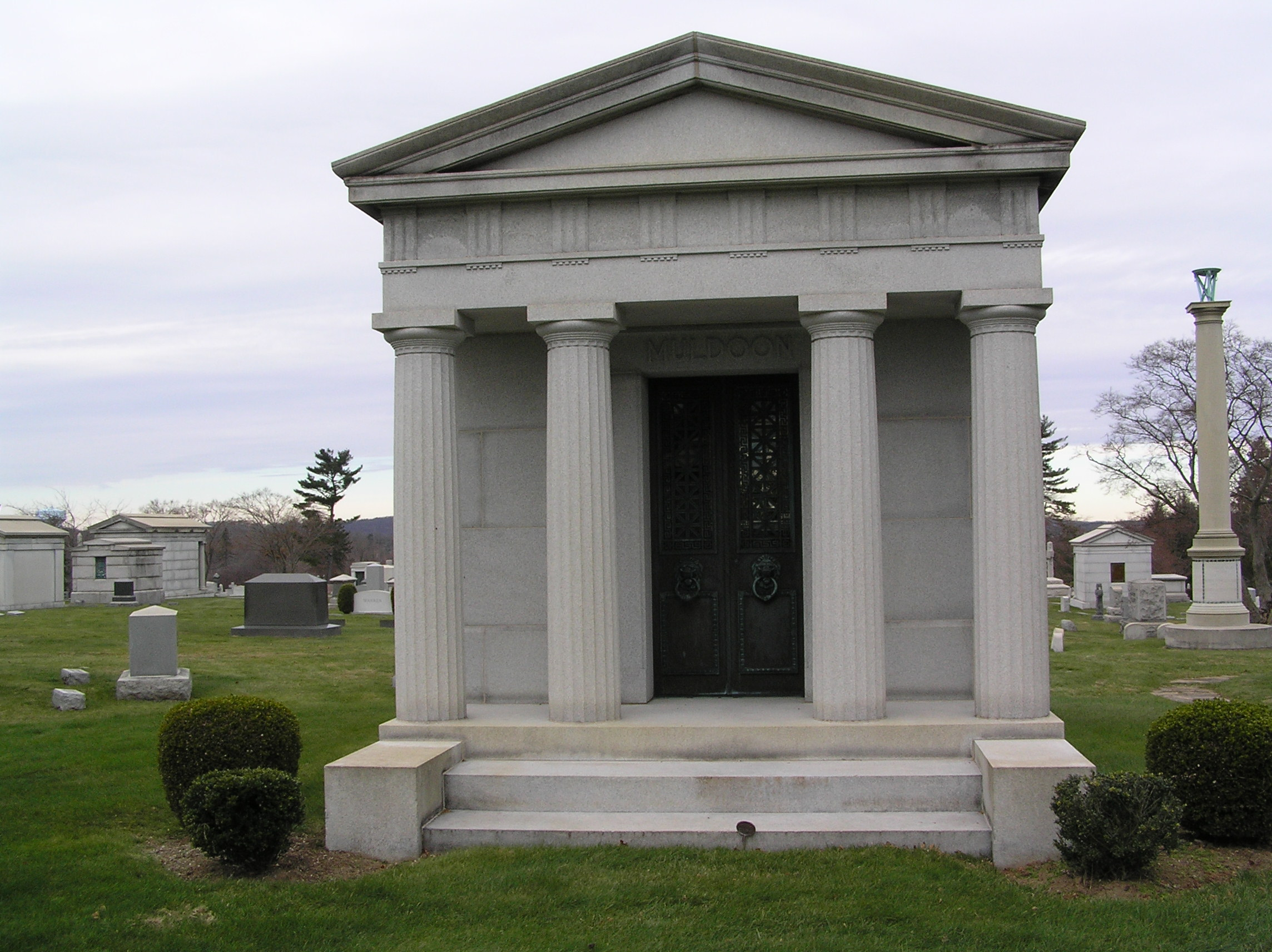
The mausoleum of William Muldoon in Kensico Cemetery

In 1921 Muldoon was personally tapped by Governor Nathan Lewis Miller as the inaugural Chairman of the New York State Athletic Commission, when professional boxing's status was legally restored in New York. While on NYSAC, Muldoon's czarish decrees characterized his inflexible sense of integrity to the press and sporting public. He was dubbed in the papers "the Iron Duke."

In 1927 Muldoon was profiled by The New Yorker magazine and in 1929 by The Saturday Evening Post. A biography was published in 1928, with a foreword by Jack Dempsey.

William Muldoon died at age 81 in Westchester County, New York, and was interred in a grandiose private mausoleum at Kensico Cemetery in Valhalla, New York. Muldoon's New York Times obituary repeated his claim to have been born in 1845 and to have served in the Civil War. U.S. Census records from 1860 and later years document his real birth year.

In 1996, Muldoon was inducted into the International Boxing Hall of Fame.

In 2004, he was inducted into the Professional Wrestling Hall of Fame and Museum under the "Pioneer Era" category.

== Personal ==
Retired boxing champion Gene Tunney, a disciple of Muldoon, remarked to the New York Times at the time of Muldoon's death, "All I know about training I learned from him... His patience, intellectual courage and wisdom were inspirational." William Muldoon was interred at Kensico Cemetery, Valhalla, NY.

== Championships and accomplishments ==
- Other titles

- World Greco-Roman Heavyweight Championship (2 times)

- Hall of Fame Inductions

- International Boxing Hall of Fame, 1996 (Non-Participant)
- Wrestling Observer Newsletter Hall of Fame (Class of 1997)
- Professional Wrestling Hall of Fame, 2004 (Pioneer Era)
- George Tragos/Lou Thesz Professional Wrestling Hall of Fame, 2001
- International Professional Wrestling Hall of Fame (Class of 2021)
- Bare Knuckle Boxing Hall of Fame (Class of 2009)
- New York State Boxing Hall of Fame (Class of 2014)
