= American Heavyweight Championship =

American professional wrestling championship

Details
- Date established: January 19, 1881
Statistics
- First champion: Edwin Bibby
- Final champion: Wladek Zbyszko
- Most reigns: Tom Jenkins, Frank Gotch, Charlie Cutler, Dr. Benjamin Roller (3 times)

The American Heavyweight Wrestling Championship was the first heavyweight professional wrestling championship in the United States. The title existed from 1881 through approximately 1922.

== Title history ==
Wrestler	Times	Date won	Location	Notes
Edwin Bibby	1	January 19, 1881	New York City	Defeats Duncan C. Ross in a catch-as-catch-can match for "the championship of America".
Joe Acton	1	August 7, 1882	New York City	Has defeated Tom Cannon on December 9, 1881, in London, England, for the Catch-as-Catch-Can Title; Bibby is billed as champion for a match against World Greco-Roman champion William Muldoon on September 3, 1882, in Elmira, NY.
Evan "Strangler" Lewis	1	April 11, 1887	Chicago	Lewis unified the American Catch-as-Catch Can Championship and the American Greco-Roman Heavyweight Championship by defeating Ernest Roeber on March 2, 1893, in a 3 out of 5 falls match with alternating Greco-Roman match and Catch-as-Catch can matches. The two titles became known as the American Heavyweight Wrestling Championship.
Martin "Farmer" Burns	1	April 20, 1895	Chicago	
Dan McLeod	1	October 26, 1897	Indianapolis	
Yusuf İsmail	1	June 20, 1898	Chicago	
Tom Jenkins	1	November 7, 1901	Cleveland, Ohio	
Dan McLeod	2	December 25, 1902	Worcester, Massachusetts	Jenkins forfeited the title to McLeod after having blood poisoning in his leg during their match.
Tom Jenkins	2	April 3, 1903	Buffalo, N.Y.	
Frank Gotch	1	January 27, 1904	Bellingham, Washington	
Tom Jenkins	3	March 15, 1905	New York City	
Frank Gotch	2	May 23, 1906	Kansas City, Missouri	
Fred Beell	1	December 1, 1906	New Orleans	
Frank Gotch	3	December 17, 1906	Kansas City, Missouri	
Vacant		1910		Gotch vacates the title after two years as a double crown champion to concentrate on the World Heavyweight Wrestling Championship he won from Georg Hackenschmidt on April 3, 1908, in Chicago, Illinois.
Henry Ordemann	1	October 25, 1910	Minneapolis	Defeats Charlie Cutler and awarded the title by special referee Frank Gotch.
Charlie Cutler	1	February 1, 1911	Minneapolis	
Dr. Benjamin Roller	1	March 6, 1911	Chicago	
Charlie Cutler	2	March 25, 1911	Buffalo, N.Y.	
Jess Reimer	1	November 7, 1911	Des Moines, Iowa	
Henry Ordemann	2	December 14, 1911	Minneapolis	
Charlie Cutler	3	March 25, 1912	Chicago	Jess Westergaard (Reimer) defeats Ordemann on January 7, 1913, in Minneapolis, Minnesota, to claim a title but loses to Cutler on January 22, 1913, in Dallas, Texas.
Dr. Benjamin Roller	2	July 4, 1913	Benton Harbor, Michigan	
Ed "Strangler" Lewis	1	September 18, 1913	Lexington, Kentucky	
William Demetral	1	October 21, 1913	Lexington, Kentucky	
Dr. Benjamin Roller	3	July 10, 1914	Rock Island, Illinois	Ed "Strangler" Lewis defeats Roller during an international tournament on January 15, 1916, in New York City (title may not be on line).
Wladek Zbyszko	1	January 8, 1917	Wilkes-Barre, Pennsylvania	Still/again champion as of September 22, 1922 (or a different reign, possibly by winning a tournament which has started on February 21, 1922).

== See also ==
- Professional wrestling in the United States
- Early wrestling championships
- World Catch-as-Catch-Can Championship
- World Greco-Roman Heavyweight Championship
