= Clarence Whistler =

American wrestler

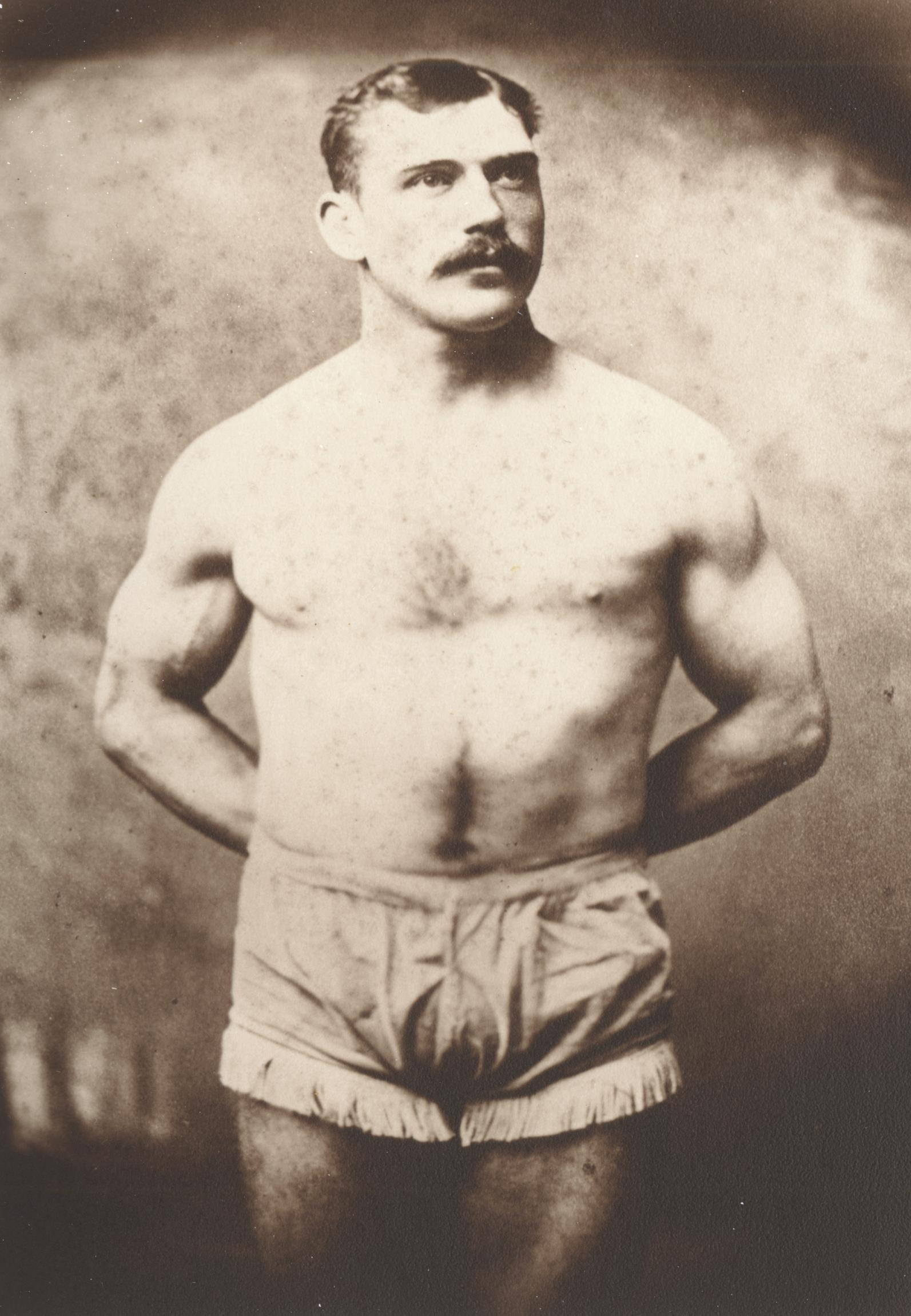
- Whistler, c. 1890

Personal information
- Born: February 24, 1856 Delphi, Indiana, US
- Died: November 6, 1885 (aged 29) Melbourne, Australia
- Cause of death: Pneumonia

Professional wrestling career
- Ring name(s): Kansas Cyclone; Kansas Demon; Wonder of the West; Omaha Demon
- Debut: February 1879

Clarence Whistler (February 24, 1856 - November 6, 1885) was a professional athlete and champion Greco-Roman wrestler of the 1880s. As the main rival to William Muldoon in wrestling of the early 1880s, he was best remembered for his unusual strength, indifference to pain and early death. He wrestled three famous bouts with Muldoon, totaling over 14 hours.

== Early life ==
Whistler was born in 1856 (possibly February 24, 1856) in Delphi, Indiana, US, to C. C. Whistler and Leah Catharine Snyder and was the oldest of eight children. By 1878 he had moved to Iowa where he worked as a foundryman and was known for his strength.

== Career ==
While working at the foundry his friends, who had been impressed with his strength, such as carrying a 1,300 lb (590 kg) iron bar for 30 ft (9.1 m), arranged a match in February 1879 (or January 1878) with Louis Marc (or Lucien Marc). The match, which lasted for an hour, was won by Whistler in two straight falls. Whistler went on to fight Andre Christol in a four-hour match that ended in a draw. This was followed by a tour of the Western United States with Christol, who taught Whistler the fundamentals of wrestling.

In 1881 Whistler's financial backers brought him into New York City to challenge William Muldoon, who had won his championship in Graeco-Roman wrestling from Theodore Bauer the year before. The bout, which lasted seven hours and 15 minutes, ended in a draw without either wrestler getting a fall. Muldoon claimed that Whistler had worn ammonia in his hair, which caused Muldoon's eyes to burn, and Whistler wore his fingernails long purposely to injure Muldoon.

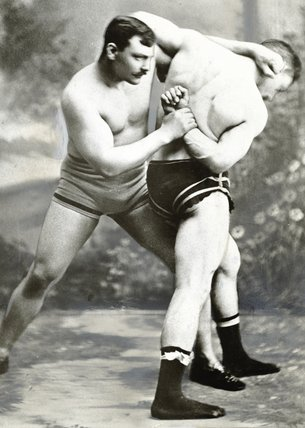
Whistler and Muldoon in 1881

Because of the public interest in the match, the two men formed an athletic combination and toured the country for a time, Muldoon billed as Graeco-Roman champion and Whistler billed as catch-as-catch-can champion. Personal differences and a fight over a woman bought an acrimonious end to their business agreement. Muldoon got the girl. Enmity was so great that Whistler swore he would beat Muldoon on the mat or in the street. He spent the rest of the year slandering Muldoon in the press in order to corner him into a rematch. But he would have to wait two years to get his chance.

After being injured against a ringer in Cincinnati who later turned out to be English wrestler Tom Cannon, Whistler stopped touring for a time and returned to Kansas City. There he met his future wife Minnie and toyed with the idea of entering the prize ring to meet champion John L. Sullivan at the behest of friend Robert Ricketts. He continued to slight Muldoon in the newspapers.

Finally returning to the mat, Whistler linked up with Cannon, who saw great natural ability in Whistler. The two toured with limited success. Whistler's assault on Muldoon in the press continued. He issued a challenge to his old foe to wrestle him at MSG which went unheeded by Muldoon, who was already headed West on tour with Madame Modjeska. In the meantime, an old foe of Cannon who claimed the catch-as-catch-can championship of the world, Joe Acton, followed him to America and beat him. Whistler then put his own title claim up against Acton at MSG. The highly anticipated match went two hours to a draw but Whistler was roundly outclassed by the smaller man, losing his already-waning claim to that championship in the process, and a great deal of his public acclaim.

Whistler won a wrestling tournament in 1883 in St. Louis, Graeco-Roman style, and placed second (to Edwin Bibby) in the catch-as-catch-can category. This quickly re-established his claim to the Graeco-Roman title, but it didn't translate into public interest. The tournament featured a number of noted wrestlers but was a financial disaster. Meanwhile, Muldoon was wrestling in San Francisco and creating a boom there. Cannon and Whistler acquiesced and lit to the Pacific Coast at the insistence of Muldoon.

Whistler's rematch with Muldoon finally took place in San Francisco toward the end of 1883. It was remembered as the most exciting of the three contests. In the term of the day, the two bitter rivals "wrestled for blood". The match began at 8:30 pm and lasted nearly four hours. Whistler's left collarbone was broken when he was slammed harshly by Muldoon to the mat. He was visibly maimed. Whistler refused to quit the match, but the doctor disallowed him to continue, thus stopped it. Muldoon claimed the victory. The injury had a temporary healing effect on the friendship of the two.

After Whistler physically healed up, he challenged Muldoon again. In their third and final match in March 1884, the two men wrestled to a defensive standstill and agreed to a draw after three hours and 10 minutes of wrestling. When the question of who initiated the draw of their third match arose, the two men again split, as business partners, bitterly never to rejoin. Muldoon left for the East as interest in the sport waned in California. Whistler stayed West and languished in bouts that generated limited public interest. In a bid to rejuvenate his career, he finally entered boxing and was soundly trounced. Headlining at the old Wigwam Theater in San Francisco on January 30, 1885, Whistler was knocked out by local pro Jack Brady in the first round. Despite the disastrous results, Whistler indicated an interest in pursuing boxing further.

== Death ==
Shortly after the boxing fiasco, "all round athlete" and longtime claimant to the Greco-Roman wrestling championship "Professor" William Miller invited Whistler to tour Australia as an athlete and wrestler, and meet Miller at the end of the tour to settle the championship question between them. Whistler accepted. After a string of victories Down Under, Whistler defeated Miller in September 1885 at the Theatre Royal on Bourke Street in Melbourne, for the Graeco-Roman championship. In celebration of his championship victory, he engaged in a reckless, month-long celebration and contracted pneumonia. By November 6, he was dead. Sources referring to the nature of his early death are conflicting. Some suggest that the illness was caused by excess alcohol consumption during celebration. Other sources purport that Whistler's condition was complicated by him either biting the tops off champagne bottles for side bets or eating a whole champagne glass.

Whistler was buried in Melbourne General Cemetery with Miller as one of his pallbearers. He was memorialized by fellow athletes, including Muldoon, and the sports world at large as the most courageous athlete of his time.

== Notable opponents ==
- William Muldoon
- "Professor" William Miller
- Joe Acton
- Donald Dinnie
- Edwin Bibby

== Championships and accomplishments ==
- American/World Mixed Style Championship
- Australian Heavyweight Championship
- St. Louis International Wrestling Tournament winner, Graeco-Roman
- Catch-as-catch-can Heavyweight Championship
- World Heavyweight Championship

== See also ==
- List of premature professional wrestling deaths
