= Evan Lewis (wrestler) =

American professional wrestler (1860–1919)

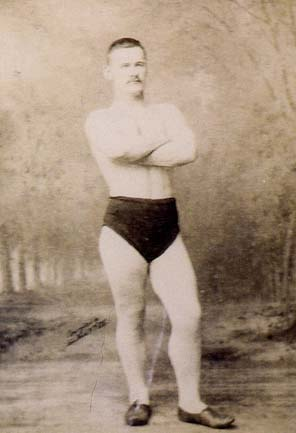
- Evan Lewis in 1919

Personal information
- Born: May 24, 1860 Ridgeway, Wisconsin, U.S.
- Died: November 3, 1919 (aged 59) Dodgeville, Wisconsin, U.S.

Professional wrestling career
- Ring name: Evan Lewis
- Billed height: 5 ft 9 in (1.75 m)
- Billed weight: 180 lb (82 kg; 13 st)
- Debut: May 1882
- Retired: 1899

Evan Lewis (May 24, 1860 – November 3, 1919) was an American professional wrestler who was the first recognized American Heavyweight Champion and is credited with perfecting the "stranglehold" or "neck yoke" more commonly known today as the sleeperhold. He is sometimes confused with Ed "Strangler" Lewis, a later six-time World Heavyweight Champion also credited with first using the hold, whose moniker is attributed to Lewis's after a reporter noted a resemblance between the two.

== Life and wrestling career ==
Born in Ridgeway, Wisconsin, of Welsh descent, Lewis began wrestling professionally winning a 64-man tournament in Montana in May 1882. He returned to Wisconsin and defeated Ben Knight for the Wisconsin Heavyweight Championship in a Mineral Point match on March 20, 1883. Moving to Madison in 1885, he later defeated several international wrestlers, including Andre Christol, Tom Cannon, and Matsuda Sorakichi.

Defeating Joe Acton in Chicago, Illinois, for the American Catch-as-Catch-can Championship on March 14, 1887, he later unified the World Catch-as-Catch-can and American Greco-Roman Heavyweight Championship in a best-of-five match against Ernest Roeber in New Orleans, Louisiana on March 3, 1893 (he also had defeated him for the "Collar and Elbow Championship" on May 18, 1890). After defending the title for over eight years, Lewis lost the American Heavyweight Championship to Martin Burns, whom he had previously defeated in his debut match in 1886.

In the 1880s he fought in Cornish wrestling challenge matches against various opponents. He lost a protracted series of matches in 1883 and 1884 against Jack Carkeek.

As with most wrestlers at this time, he fought in mixed style challenge matches for significant prizes. For example, in 1892, in Chicago, he beat the Cornish wrestling champion Jack King in a 5 styles match (Greco-Roman, Catch as catch can, American side hold, Cornish and Collar-and-elbow) for $500.

In Chicago on June 20, 1898, Lewis faced Yusuf İsmail, a 300 lb wrestler known as the Terrible Turk, with a claimed record of 115 wins and no losses across Europe. The match took place in front of a reported audience of 10,000, for a purse of $3,500 and the “championship of the world”, and the stranglehold was barred. Within three minutes, İsmail as able to get Lewis into a stranglehold so the fall was awarded to Lewis. After being cautioned a second time for the stranglehold, İsmail won the second and third rounds in six and seven minutes respectively, though the method was reported to be a stranglehold again, which was barred. Afterwards Lewis was quoted as saying, “I was licked. The Turk is the better man.” This was İsmail's last match as he died at sea the next month.

Lewis died of cancer in Dodgeville, Wisconsin on November 3, 1919.

== Championships and accomplishments ==
- Catch wrestling
  - World Catch-as-Catch-Can Championship (1 time)
  - American Catch-as-Catch-can Championship (1 time)
- Greco-Roman wrestling
  - American Greco-Roman Heavyweight Championship (1 time)
- International Professional Wrestling Hall of Fame
  - Class of 2021
- Professional wrestling
  - American Heavyweight Championship (1 time)
  - British World Heavyweight Championship (1 time)
  - Wisconsin Heavyweight Championship (1 time)
- Wrestling Observer Newsletter
  - Wrestling Observer Newsletter Hall of Fame (Class of 2007)
- Professional Wrestling Hall of Fame and Museum
  - Class of 2009
