= Joe Acton =

British professional wrestler

Joseph Acton
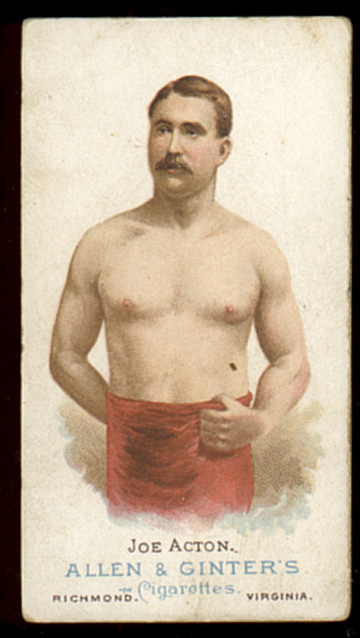
- Acton on an 1887 Wrestling Card.

Personal information
- Born: Joseph Acton; 8 March 1852 England
- Died: 26 June 1917 (aged 65) Portland, Oregon, United States

Professional wrestling career
- Ring name: Joe Acton
- Billed height: 5 ft 5 in (1.65 m)
- Billed weight: 140 lb (64 kg)
- Debut: 1880
- Retired: 1911

Joseph Acton (8 March 1852 – 26 June 1917), known by his ringname "Little Joe" or "Limey Joe", was a British professional wrestler and world champion who competed in England and America during the late 19th century. Acton is one of a handful of wrestlers credited with introducing "catch-as-catch-can" wrestling (also known today as free-style), with its roots in old Lancashire wrestling, to the United States. Wrestling under the name Joe Acton, and nicknamed "The Little Demon," Acton was considered one of the top wrestlers of his era.

== Career ==
Acton began wrestling in his native Great Britain during the 1870s defeating Tom Cannon to become the first World Catch-as-Catch-Can Heavyweight Champion on 12 December 1881. He toured the United States that same year facing several prominent wrestlers including Edwin Bibby, Arkansas Heavyweight Champion Clarence Whistler, and Matsada Sorakichi as well as several rematches against Tom Cannon and was widely regarded as the best wrestler in America by 1887, although he lost the American "Catch-as-Catch-can" Championship bout to Evan "Strangler" Lewis on 14 March 1887 in one of the biggest matches of the decade.

Acton would also face Australian bare-knuckle boxer William Miller in a series of wrestling matches in Philadelphia, Pennsylvania between March and July 1888 as well as Bob Fitzsimmons in 1891.

Although retiring close to the turn of the century, he did agree to several exhibition matches while a student instructor at Multnomah Athletic Club in Portland, Oregon.

In one of his final matches, at age 59, Action faced Tokugoro Ito in a jacketed wrestling match at the Grand Opera House in Seattle, Washington on 11 May 1911. Although he had previous experience in jujitsu-style fighting having faced British judoka Yukio Tanai in 1904, he lost to Ito in two bouts, in three and two minutes respectively.

== Championships and accomplishments ==
- Catch wrestling

- American Catch-as-Catch-Can Championship (1 time)

- European Catch-as-Catch-Can Championship (1 time)
- World Catch-as-Catch-Can Championship (1 time)

- Collar and Elbow wrestling

- Dublin Collar-and-Elbow Championship (1 time)

- Professional Wrestling
  - American Heavyweight Championship (1 time)
  - World Middleweight Championship (1 time)
