= Early wrestling championships =

Early professional wrestling championships

Early wrestling championships started in Ancient Greece, before spreading out to the Celtic culture, North America, and Europe.

== Early history ==
The history of wrestling dates back to the Ancient Greece. There were two wrestling championships since the 776 BC Olympic games: a toppling event for the best two of three falls; and the pankration (Latin: pancratium), which combined wrestling and boxing and ended in the submission of one contestant. Upright wrestling was also a part of the pentathlon event in the Olympic Games, a bout being fought to a clear-cut fall of one of the wrestlers. The most famous ancient Greek wrestler was Milon of Croton, who won the wrestling championship of the Olympic Games six times. He won extreme fame in that time.

== Wrestling champions in Celtic culture ==
Early accounts of grappling in single combat can be found in various manuscripts in Old Irish during the 15th century. In the meeting between Cu Chulain and his son Conla they first wrestled before resorting to deadly combat. The style of wrestling they used required the grapplers to grip each other's belts in the opening stance. Various forms of belt wrestling still exist today in Europe. Art MacConn, the father of Cormac, was said to have wrestled a giant, as well as Diarmuid of Fenian fame. Diarmuid is also credited to have wrestled the champion Dubh-Chosach. These two combatant, though fully armed, chose to thrown down their weapons and meet empty handed. Ossian and a foreign champion also chose to discard their weapons in an individual combat and take to grappling.

== North America ==
Wrestling has existed in the North America since the colonial period of the 15th century. During the 18th Century President George Washington was formerly a wrestler. At the age of 18 he won a collar and elbow wrestling championship that was quite popular across Virginia. He was famed for his brute strength and wrestling abilities. At the age of 47, ten years before he became the first President of the United States, George Washington defeat seven consecutive challengers from the Massachusetts Volunteers. Not recorded to have lost the title, Washington's championship regime is indicated to have lasted at least 29 years. It is not known whether a physical form of the title existed as with modern-day championship belt, but it has been historically noted as a championship, one of the earliest in North American history. Abraham Lincoln was a champion of Catch-as-catch-can wrestling during the 19th Century. Lincoln won an Illinois County wrestling championship in 1830.

== World Greco-Roman Heavyweight Championship ==
The World/American Greco-Roman Heavyweight Championship and the World/European Greco-Roman Heavyweight Championship was a Greco-Roman professional wrestling championship contested for throughout the continent of Australia, Europe and North America.The title existed from 1875 through approximately 1937.

== Other championships in Europe ==
Professional wrestling matches were organized everywhere in Europe with variable programs and competition rules according to the taste of wrestlers, of managers and of the audience. In 1898, the Frenchman Paul Pons, “the Colossus”, also named “the Colossus”, was the first Professional World Champion just before the Polish Ladislaus Pytlasinski. Some other great champions succeeded him, like the Turkish Kara Ahmed (the eastern Monster), the Bulgarian Nikola Petrov (the lion of the Balkans) or the Russian Ivan Poddoubni (the Champion of Champions).

== American Heavyweight Championship ==
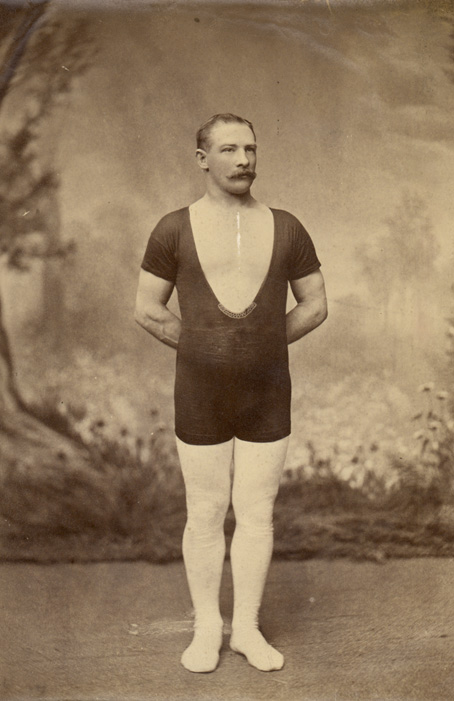
Edwin Bibby, the first American Heavyweight Champion. As of present day the lineage of the prestigious American Heavyweight Championship is continued by the WWE Championship.

Edwin Bibby won the first American Heavyweight Championship in New York defeating Duncan C. Ross on January 19, 1881. It was the first widely recognized Heavyweight Championship in North America.

== World Heavyweight Wrestling Championship ==
The World Heavyweight Wrestling Championship was the first recognized professional wrestling world heavyweight championship in the United States created in 1905 to identify the best catch as catch can wrestler in the world. It was also the first wrestling championship known to have a physical representation of the belt. Russian born World Greco-Roman Heavyweight Champion George Hackenschmidt defeated American born American Heavyweight Champion Tom Jenkins in New York City in a Champion vs Champion match to win the inaugural World Heavyweight Championship, the first widely recognized world title. Its lineage was claimed both by the WWF Championship and the WCW World Heavyweight Championship, with the two titles being unified by professional wrestler Chris Jericho at WWF Vengeance 2001 becoming the undisputed WWF World Heavyweight Champion which today is simply called the WWE Championship.
