= Sorakichi Matsuda =

Japanese professional wrestler (1859–1891)

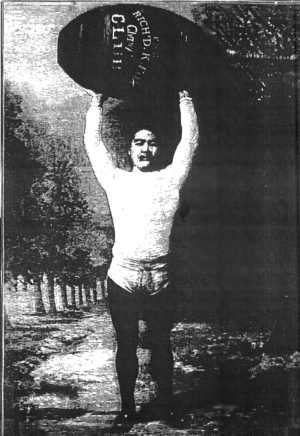
- Sorakichi Matsuda in the 1880s

Personal information
- Born: Koujiro Matsuda; 1859 Japan
- Died: 16 August 1891 (aged 31–32) New York City, United States

Professional wrestling career
- Ring name: Sorakichi Matsuda
- Billed height: 5 ft 5 in (1.65 m)
- Billed weight: 170 lb (77 kg)
- Debut: January 14, 1884
- Retired: May 13, 1891

Matsuda Sorakichi (1859 – August 16, 1891) was a Japanese professional wrestler of the 19th century. He became a feature attraction in America, competing in a distinctly western sport, long before it was adopted in Japan.

== Background ==
Sorakichi was born Koujiro Matsuda (Kanji: 松田幸次郎, Hiragana: まつだ こうじろう) in Japan. He trained and competed in sumo, under the sumo name Torakichi (荒竹寅吉). In sumo, Sorakichi reportedly trained with the Isegahama stable and won 53 of 100 matches. These names were later corrupted by American promoters and the sporting press into "Matsada Korgaree Sorakichi," as he would be known in America for the rest of his life. To colleagues he was known as "Mat" or "The Jap."

== Wrestling career ==
Matsuda came to the United States in 1883 and had his first match in New York City on January 14, 1884. He lost to the Englishman Edwin Bibby. In March, 1884, Matsuda beat Bibby and then James Daley in New York City. Over the next few months he went on the road and wrestled in Cleveland, Baltimore, Buffalo, Rochester, Philadelphia, Cincinnati, Chicago and Peoria. His opponents included Duncan C. Ross, Jack Gallagher, Benny Jones, Joe Acton, Carlos Martino, Andre Christol and Ted George.

Greco-Roman Champion William Muldoon was Matsuda's most famous opponent. Muldoon beat Matsuda in Chicago on July 18, 1884. Matsuda returned to New York City in August, 1884, where he lived until June, 1885. While in New York City he beat James Quigley and Jack Herd, drew with Karl Abs and William Muldoon, and lost twice to Abs. In June 1885 he wrestled in Cleveland and Scranton, Pennsylvania in December.

On May 5, 1885, William Muldoon challenged Sorakichi to a handicap match, wagering $100 that he could pin the Japanese wrestler five times in one hour. Muldoon failed in his endeavor, pinning Sorakichi only once in one hour.

During a February 15, 1886 match with Evan "Strangler" Lewis Sorakichi reportedly had his leg broken in a leg lock but was back in action one month later. In March, 1886, Matsuda lost to the British World Heavyweight Champion Tom Cannon in Cleveland and drew with the German World Heavyweight Champion Ernest Roeber in New York City. The match against Roeber took place at the Germania Assembly Roon, in the Bowery.

Matsuda was on the road the rest of 1886, wrestling in Cleveland, Philadelphia, Ashland, Wisconsin and St. Louis. opponents included Duncan Ross, Joe Acton, Jack Carkeek, James Doner, James Faulkner and Bernarr MacFadden.

During 1887, he wrestled in Buffalo, Cleveland, Detroit, Rio de Janeiro and Baltimore. In 1888 he toured Pennsylvania (Philadelphia, Pittsburgh, Erie and Scranton) and also visited Lowell, Massachusetts. His opponents included Jesse Clark, Joe Acton, Jack Hart, Jim Connors, H.M. Dufur, Harvey Parker, William Muldoon, and John McMahon. In January and February, 1889 he wrestled August La Grange, William Muldoon and Ted George in Philadelphia. His last match was on May 13, 1891, against Martin "Farmer" Burns in Troy, New York.

He competed in mixed style matches often in styles, such as Cornish wrestling, with which he was not familiar.

== Later life and death ==
Matsuda tried unsuccessfully to bring American wrestling to Japan: he continued to work in the US. On August 16, 1891, he died destitute in New York City at age 32. He is interred in Woodlawn Cemetery in The Bronx, New York City.

In February, 1902, eleven years after his death Cornish champion wrestler Jack Carkeek told the British sporting paper Mirror of Life that he held "a high opinion of Sorakichi, the Jap, whom he considers to probably be the cleverest man in the world at his weight. The plucky little Jap has suffered numerous defeats simply because he has tackled all the best men of the day, no matter what their size or weight might be, and the good little ones must ever go down to big ones".
