= World Greco-Roman Heavyweight Championship =

The World/American Greco-Roman Heavyweight Championship and the World/European Greco-Roman Heavyweight Championship was a Greco-Roman professional wrestling championship contested for throughout the continent of Australia, Europe and North America.The title existed from 1875 through approximately 1937.

The final champion Georg Hackenschmidt defeated American Heavyweight Champion, Tom Jenkins, on May 5, 1905 in New York City, New York to unify both titles and become the undisputed World Heavyweight Champion.

== World/American Greco-Roman Heavyweight Championship Title history ==
Wrestler:	Times:	Date Won:	Location:	Notes:
Andre Christol	1			Claims United States Graeco-Roman Title; loses to William Miller on in New York, NY but continues to claim the title due to injury during the match; rematch on November 9, 1875 ends as a draw.
Thiebaud Bauer	1		New York City	Billed as World Greco-Roman Heavyweight Championship.
Andre Christol	2		New York City	
William Miller	1			
Thiebaud Bauer	2		Cincinnati	
William Miller	2			Billed as American Greco-Roman Heavyweight Championship in New York, NY; still champion as of June 15, 1877.
William Muldoon	1		New York City	Defeats Thiebaud Bauer; announces his (temporary) retirement in September 1882.
Duncan C. Ross	1		Jacksonville, Florida	Defeats Thiebaud Bauer.
Thiebaud Bauer	3		New Orleans	
William Muldoon	2		New York City	Vacates in 1891 upon retirement.
Ernest Roeber	1			Awarded by Muldoon upon retirement (or 91/12/31; one source says Muldoon awards the title to Ernest Roeber in 87); also defeats French title claimant Apollon on 92/07/25 in New York, NY; also awarded the European Greco-Roman Heavyweight Championship on 94/09/26 in Hamburg, Germany. Evan "Strangler" Lewis defeats Roeber on 93/03/02 in New Orleans in mixed-style match to become American Heavyweight champion.
Magnus Bech-Olsen	1		New York City	
Ernest Roeber	2		Copenhagen, Denmark	
John Piening	1		New York City	Defeats Raoul de Cahors; also defeats title claimant Nehmed Nachad, who may have been claiming the title, on 02/01/02 in New York, NY; Charles Wittmer also claims the title as of 02/01/07.
Henry H. Edgeberg	1		New York City	
John Piening	2		New York City	Still champion as of 07/06/05.
Aleksander Aberg	1			
Stanislaus Zbyszko	1			
Aleksander Aberg	2		Boston	Still recognized in 16/01/29.

== World/European Greco-Roman Heavyweight Championship Title history ==
Wrestler:	Times:	Date Won:	Location:	Notes:
Tom Cannon	1	August 22, 1886	Melbourne, Australia	Defeated William Miller also defeats Tom McInerney to become the first champion.
Antonio Pierri	1	September 5, 1886	Manchester, England, Great Britain	
Tom Cannon	2	September 26, 1886	Manchester, England, Great Britain	
Carl Abs	1	September 5, 1894	Hamburg, Germany	
Ernest Roeber	1	September 26, 1894	Hamburg, Germany	Awarded.
Magnus Beck-Olsen	1	March 28, 1900	New York City, New York	Has been billed as the "champion wrestler of Europe"; defeats Roeber, billed as "Graeco-Roman champion of America", in a world championship match.
Ernest Roeber	2	September 12, 1900	Copenhagen, Denmark	Vacates in 1901
Title vacated	-	1901		
Antonio Pierri	2	May 3, 1901	London, England	Claims the title in Czech Republic and Hungary for having defeated Tom Cannon "fifty times"; loses to Tom Cannon on 97/03/01 in Liverpool, ENG, GBR (see below) but continues to claim the title; loses to Magnus Bech-Olsen on 97/10/10 in Copenhagen, DEN (see above).
Tom Cannon	3	May 3, 1901	London, England	Defeated Antonio Pierre for the vacant title.
Georg Hackenschmidt	1	September 4, 1902	Liverpool, England	Defeats George Rasso (or has continued to claim the title since losing to Carl Abs on 91/07/25 and retains it this day); also defeats Antonio Pierri on 97/03/01 in Liverpool, ENG, GBR; still recognized in Liverpool as of 95/05/31, 97/03/01, and 98/07/30; billed as undisputed champion in Middlesbrough, N. Yorkshire, ENG, GBR as of 00/11/24 (The North-Eastern Daily Gazette); defeats Jack Carkeek on 99/12/04 in Liverpool and is also recognized in London.
Title retired		May 5, 1905	New York City, New York	Hackenschmidt defeats American Heavyweight Champion Tom Jenkins to become the undisputed World Heavyweight Champion.

== See also ==
- American Heavyweight Championship
- Early wrestling championships
- European Heavyweight Championship
- World Catch-as-Catch-Can Championship
- List of early world heavyweight champions in professional wrestling
