= Lancashire wrestling =

Folk wrestling style from England

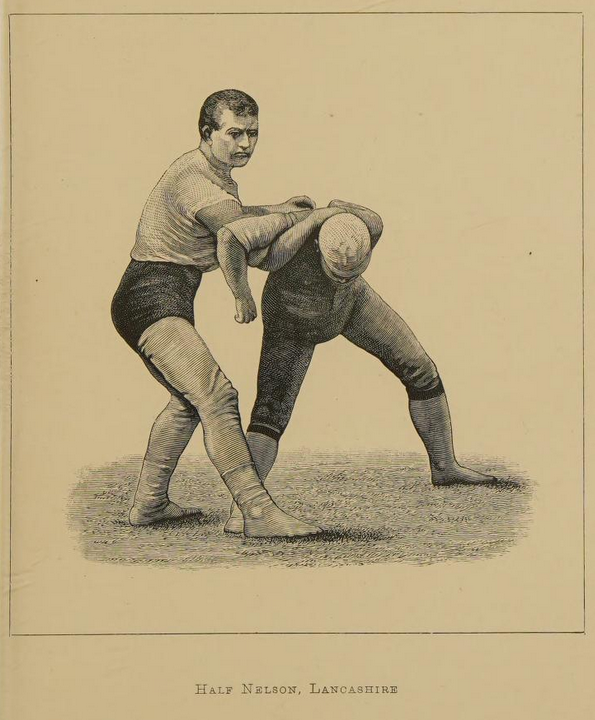
- Illustration of a half Nelson technique
- Also known as: Catch-as-catch-can; Lancashire catch-as-catch-can Lancashire style
- Focus: Grappling, ground fighting
- Country of origin: England
- Famous practitioners: Sam Hurst; Donald Dinnie; Edwin Bibby; Joe Acton; Tom Cannon; Jack Carkeek; Billy Riley; Joseph Reid; Herbie Hall; See more
- Ancestor arts: Folk styles from England and continental Europe
- Descendant arts: Catch wrestling; Freestyle wrestling; American folkstyle wrestling; Theatrical pro wrestling; Luta livre; Submission grappling; Vale tudo; Shooto; Mixed martial arts; And other associated styles
- Olympic sport: No

Lancashire wrestling, commonly called Lancashire catch-as-catch-can or Lancashire style, is a folk wrestling style that originated in the historic county of Lancashire in North West England. It became notable as the least restrictive and most aggressive style in England. It was popular across Britain and abroad, becoming a primary influence on catch wrestling, through which it is an ancestor of freestyle wrestling, American folkstyle wrestling, Brazilian luta livre, Japanese shoot wrestling and Shooto, modern submission grappling, and associated styles like mixed martial arts and theatrical professional wrestling.

== Description ==
The style was practiced and popularised in the area that now includes Lancashire, Greater Manchester, and West Yorkshire. The objective was to achieve a back fall on the opponent by making both of their shoulders touch the ground simultaneously. There were two approaches to this, "wrossle for a thrut" (wrestling for a throw) and "up and down." In "wrossle for a thrut", competitors utilised stand-up techniques such as throws, trips, and other takedowns with the goal of sending an opponent to their back or otherwise taking them off their feet, depending on the conditions. In "up and down", the wrestling would continue on the ground, utilising grounded techniques to win by pin or submission. This was similar to German and Dutch/Flemish folk styles: halber ringkampf ("half wrestling") and ganzer ringkampf ("full wrestling") in German, and neergooi ("throwing someone down") and ondergooi ("throwing someone down and keeping him underneath") in Dutch/Flemish. According to Jim Parr, a champion from Wigan in the early 1900s, "In Lancashire, where the Lancashire or catch-as-catch-can-game, as it is called, originated, all falls count when the shoulders touch the mat together. It makes no difference whether you throw a fellow over your head, and let go of him, or whether you press him down with a hammerlock, or roll him: It is a fall every time the shoulders strike together."

There were minimal restrictions on holds and the use of legs, for throws and trips, was permitted. Common holds and positions included the knuckle lock, collar tie, body lock, headlock, fireman's lift, cross-buttock (hip throw), the Nelson, single leg and double leg takedowns, as well as par terre (grounded). The attire was simple, shorts and socks. The Snipe Inn Rules disallowed applying any resin, drugs, or grease; foul acts or wilful brutality, unmanly techniques and tactics like those common in "up and down fighting" bouts, choking ("hanging" or "throttling"), kicking, headbutting, biting, gouging, or scratching. The Snipe Inn Rules allowed submissions with the intent of using them to achieve a pin but not with the intent to hurt an opponent or make them quit. Although submissions were usually disallowed, wrestlers were known to evade this by using variations of legal techniques to inflict pain and make their opponents "concede" the match.

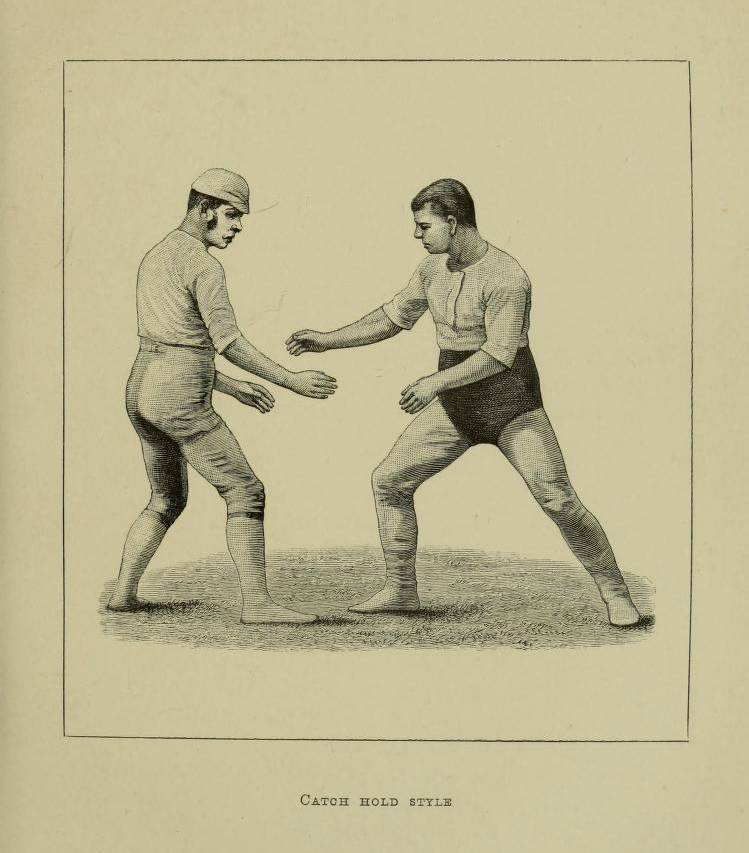
Wrestlers facing each-other.

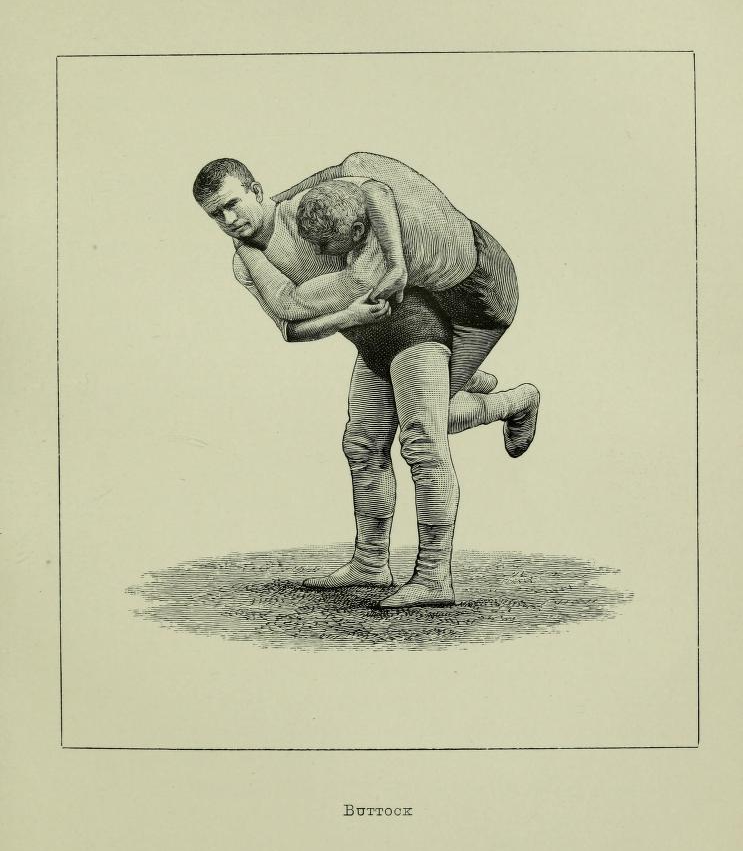
Lancashire wrestlers were known for the "buttock" (hip throw).

Wrestling on the ground made the Lancashire style unique in England, along with its minimal restrictions on holds and techniques—known as "catch-hold" or "catch-as-catch-can"—in contrast to the more restrictive Cornish, Devon, Cumberland and Westmorland wrestling styles.

In his book Wrestling (1890), Walter Armstrong described the style as:

"...without doubt, the roughest and most uncultivated of the three recognized English systems, as it includes catching hold of the legs, wrestling on the ground, and other objectionable methods of attack and defence. In Lancashire, wrestling displays are confined to matches promoted by the proprietor of some popular pedestrian resort, and differ as much as it is possible to imagine from the immense gatherings in the arenas of Cumberland and Westmorland, where sometimes nearly two hundred wrestlers will assemble, varying in weight from nine stone up to twenty stone odd."

Although, Armstrong admitted, "In a rough-and-tumble encounter, when 'all is in,' a knowledge of Lancashire wrestling might be of service; but even in a street fight it is not the fashion for an Englishman to battle on the ground, but to allow his opponent to get up again." He compared it to French wrestling, now known as Greco-Roman wrestling, "The Lancashire system is closely allied to the French style. The only material difference is that the French forbid tripping and catching hold of legs, whereas both are allowed in the County Palatine, in addition to the use of any fair means of throwing an antagonist." And describing the wrestlers, "Fortunate it is for the human race in general that Lancashire wrestlers are mostly small men, Acton and Bibby, the two fiercest exponents of this uncivilised fashion of wrestling, being only 5 ft. 5 in. in height and 10 1/2 stone weight and 5 ft. 4 in. and 11 stone weight respectively." According to Armstrong, the referee was "invested with full power to decide any point not provided for in the articles of agreement, subject to no appeal in a court of law." Although throttling (choking) was disallowed, it continued to be common. Breaking limbs such as fingers or arms was permitted if the wrestler could "satisfy the referee that such took place during a fairly-conducted struggle for the mastery, and not through any desire to deliberately act in an unfair manner." It was possible to disqualify and replace the referee if he was proven incompetent or prejudiced. There were rest periods between falls and if a match did not finish on the day, it would be restarted at the same time the next day (except Sunday) after reweighing the competitors.

Many of the wrestlers were textile workers and colliers, with a predominantly working class audience. As a result, Victorian era newspapers and magazines gave it little recognition until its popularity grew, leaving relatively few written records in contrast to the more widely accepted styles of the time. The wrestlers and their financial backers would sign an agreement under a governing body (usually a newspaper like the Sporting Chronicle or Wigan Examiner), with a referee being appointed to control the match and pay out the wager. Matches were known to take place at locations like taverns, public houses, sporting grounds, or even coal fields. Gambling was standard, an audience would gather and bets would be collected in hats. Casual wrestling was also common in pubs and public parks. A rise in popularity attracted regular press coverage and bouts were staged in theatres and music halls, featuring theatrics as part of variety acts. Wrestlers from Europe, the United States, and other countries also toured England. Such flamboyances along with match fixing moved the style from sport to commercial entertainment, gradually setting a foundation for modern theatrical professional wrestling in Britain.

== History ==
=== Origins ===
Variations of "loose" wrestling styles in England have been recorded since the Anglo-Saxon period and the roots of Lancashire wrestling have been traced to Bolton in the 1330s, with significant influence from continental European styles. They were brought by Protestant textile workers fleeing religious persecution, namely German bauern-art ringen (wrestling after the farmers' fashion) and Flemish stoeijen (to touse, to tangle, to scuffle, to handle roughly). The styles practiced by these German, Flemish, as well as French immigrants, blended with the local style, resulting in "Lancashire up and down fighting", also called "purring", and "the Bolton method" due to the style's roots in that area. By the English Civil War, it was a usual way to resolve disputes between men in the areas of East Lancashire and West Yorkshire, who commonly wore loin clothes and clogs, and engaged in a combination of wrestling, throttling, and kicking. The bouts ended by submission, usually through a hang (stranglehold), or inability to continue, signalled verbally or by raising a hand. It soon became the only "prize ring" (professional) combat sport practiced in the area. In the 1820s, the sport was made illegal due to serious injuries and deaths that commonly occurred, and was succeeded by Lancashire wrestling, reflecting a similar trend in continental Europe. This is also the period when it began to be called "catch-as-catch-can."

=== Lancashire catch-as-catch-can ===
Threatened by the loss of an entire industry, the publicans (pub owners and managers) of Ashton reformed the local professional fighting circuit into wrestling in 1928, incorporating the "fair back fall" (two shoulders on the ground) based on Cornish and Devon wrestling, although ground wrestling made the style unique in England. Wrestling was a usual pastime for amateurs in the area, competing in challenge matches to see who was better, commonly betting quarter or half gallons of beer, and tournament prizes included pigs and silver watches. In 1856, the first written ruleset (the Snipe Inn Rules) was issued by Nelson Warren, proprietor of the Snipe Inn Grounds in Audenshaw, and professional championships were established such as the Snipe Inn Grounds Gold Cup and the Copenhagen Grounds Silver Belt. Also around that time, the Lancashire style was introduced to Scotland by Donald Dinnie, where it gained popularity. Lancashire catch-as-catch-can expanded abroad through the century, becoming particularly popular in the United States, where it was known as "ground wrestling", also called "rough and tumble" by workers on the frontier, leading to an American variation. The Lancashire Wrestling Association (LWA) was established in 1875–76 by former owners of the area's notable sporting venues (grounds). It ran regular competitions using "Manchester Sporting Chronicle Rules", based on the original Snipe Inn Rules. In 1894, a world title bout at Bengler's Circus in Liverpool between Tom Cannon and American Tom McInerney attracted an "immense crowd" and programs featuring wrestlers from across Europe and America became common. Regional bouts were also popular, such as a February 1897 match between Joe Carroll of Hindley facing "Bull Dog" Tom Clayton of Farnworth, which attracted 3,000 spectators to the Heywood Athletic Grounds. In 1899, during the Easter holidays, the first British championships were held at the National Athletic Grounds in Kensal Rise, London, for the 12 stone (170 lb; 76 kg) and 10 stone 4 pounds (65 kg; 144 lb) championships. Joe Carroll won the 12 stone tournament, becoming the first champion of Britain, while the 10 stone 4 pounds championship went undetermined.

In 1904, the sport was changed again by the establishment of the National Amateur Wrestling Association of Great Britain (NAWA). Also called "catch-as-catch-can", it was a different style based in London, using a revised version of the Manchester Sporting Chronicle Rules. With the emphasis on amateur competition after the start of the Olympics, wrestlers who had competed for prizes or wagers were banned. It has been claimed this was because the working class professionals were more skilled than the amateurs, who were primarily upper class. As the century progressed, the style divided further into local competitions like the working class men of south Lancashire, and the popular music hall acts seen nationally which would become modern theatrical professional wrestling. Notably, theatrical pro wrestling was a failure in Wigan because the local miners were already "so rough that they could not be impressed." In October 1923, the Lancashire County Amateur Wrestling Association (LCAWA) was established, leading to a renewal of the Lancashire style. It was a member of the NAWA until April 1927, when it was expelled for promoting "their own championship titles." The LCAWA continued to promote their own tournaments until the mid-1930s and several LCAWA champions became British championships. The most notable was Joseph Reid, a six-time British champion, British Empire Games medallist, and Olympian. Also in the 1930s, the Wrestling and Boxing Comrades' Association (W&BCA) was established in the town of Wigan. Notable members included Joe Carroll and Billy Riley, founder of Riley's Gym, now known as The Snake Pit. After World War II, the British Amateur Wrestling Association rebranded the sport as "freestyle wrestling", essentially separating itself from Lancashire catch-as-catch-can. Many Lancashire wrestlers successfully transitioned to the new style, like Herbie Hall, a ten-time British champion, British Empire silver medallist, and Olympian.

==== Notable Lancashire wrestlers ====
- 1820s–30s — John Rowland of Bolton, William Buckley ("Trout") and John Holt – both of Oldham
- 1840s–50s — Adam Ridings ("Dockum") of Bury, James Matley ("Barrel") of Ashton, George Swithenbank of Saddleworth, undefeated heavyweight champion William Swann of Ashton, and champion heavyweight boxer Sam Hurst of Stalybridge
- 1860s — Teddy Lowe of Whitworth (reportedly the best pound-for-pound catch wrestler of the 19th century), John Meadowcroft and David Bentley of Bury, William Schora, Frank Robinson, John Massey, Joseph Newton ("Teapot") – all from the Ashton area
- 1870s — Edwin Bibby of Ashton, John Lees and John Butterworth ("Dockum") – both of Oldham, undefeated heavyweight champion William Snape ("Dipper") of Bolton, John Tonge ("Eckersley"), Joe Acton, William Moullineux ("Sellars"), Miles Sweeney – all of Wigan
- 1880s–90s — Abraham Travis ("Ab-o-Wags") of Oldham, James Faulkner, Isaac Smith, William Winstanley ("Soap"), Tom Connor, Charles Green, Tom Jones ("Burgy Ben"), Joe Carroll, James Morris ("Stockley") – all from the Wigan area; Tom Clayton ("Bulldog") of Bolton, James Mellor and Jack Smith – both of Stalybridge, Sam Moores of Salford, Jack Carkeek of Rockland, Michigan
- 1900s–10s — Harry Mort of Oldham, Tom Rose of Bolton, Willie Collins, Jack Carroll (nephew of Joe Carroll), Jack Brown, William Charnock ("Pop"), Joe Smith, Jim Foster, Bob Berry, Jim Parr – all of Wigan; Job Shambley of Westhoughton, Peter Bannon of Burnley, Jack Winrow of Heywood
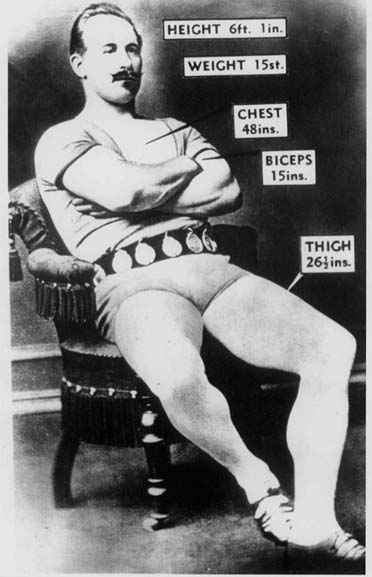
Donald Dinnie

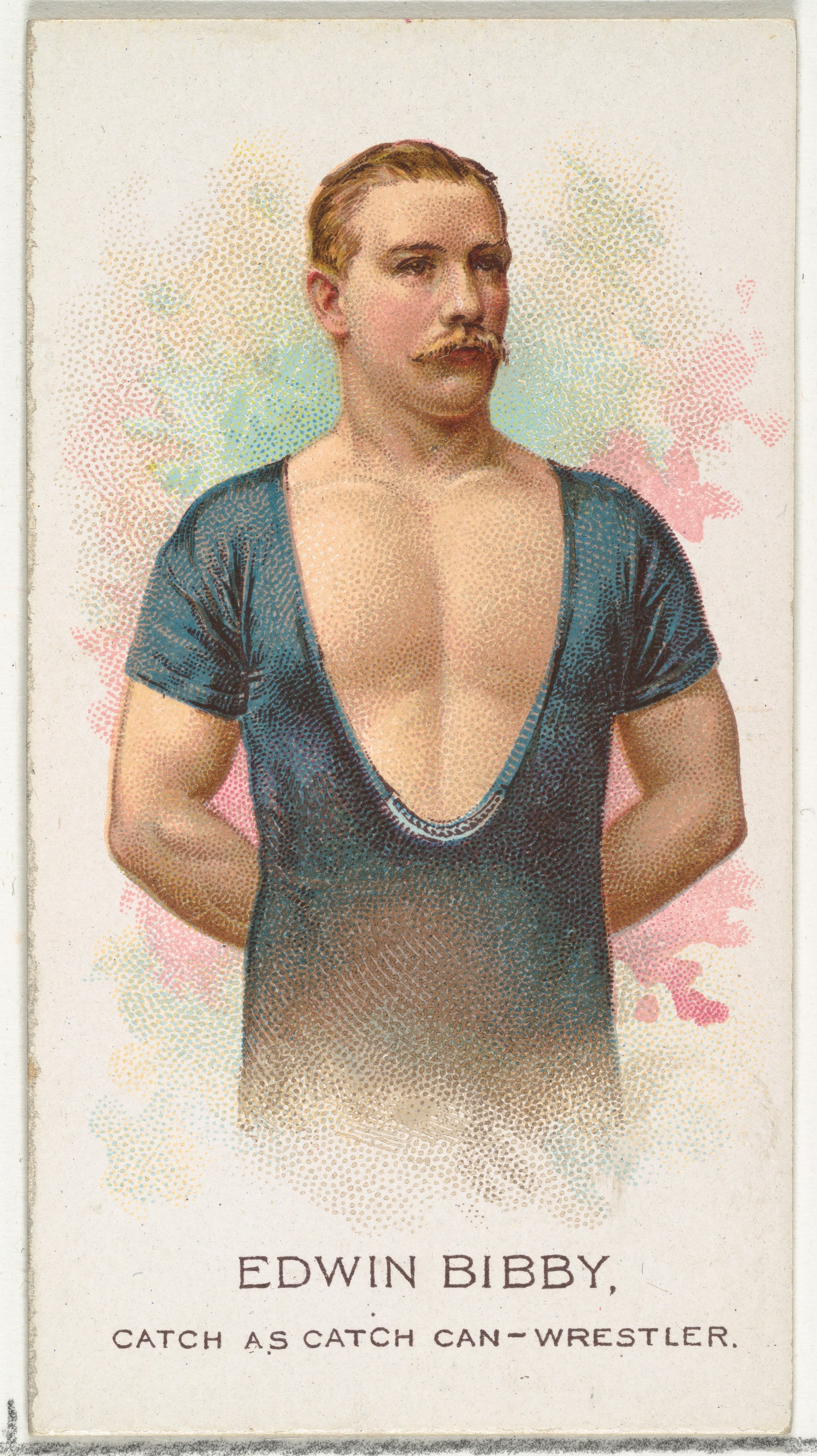
Edwin Bibby

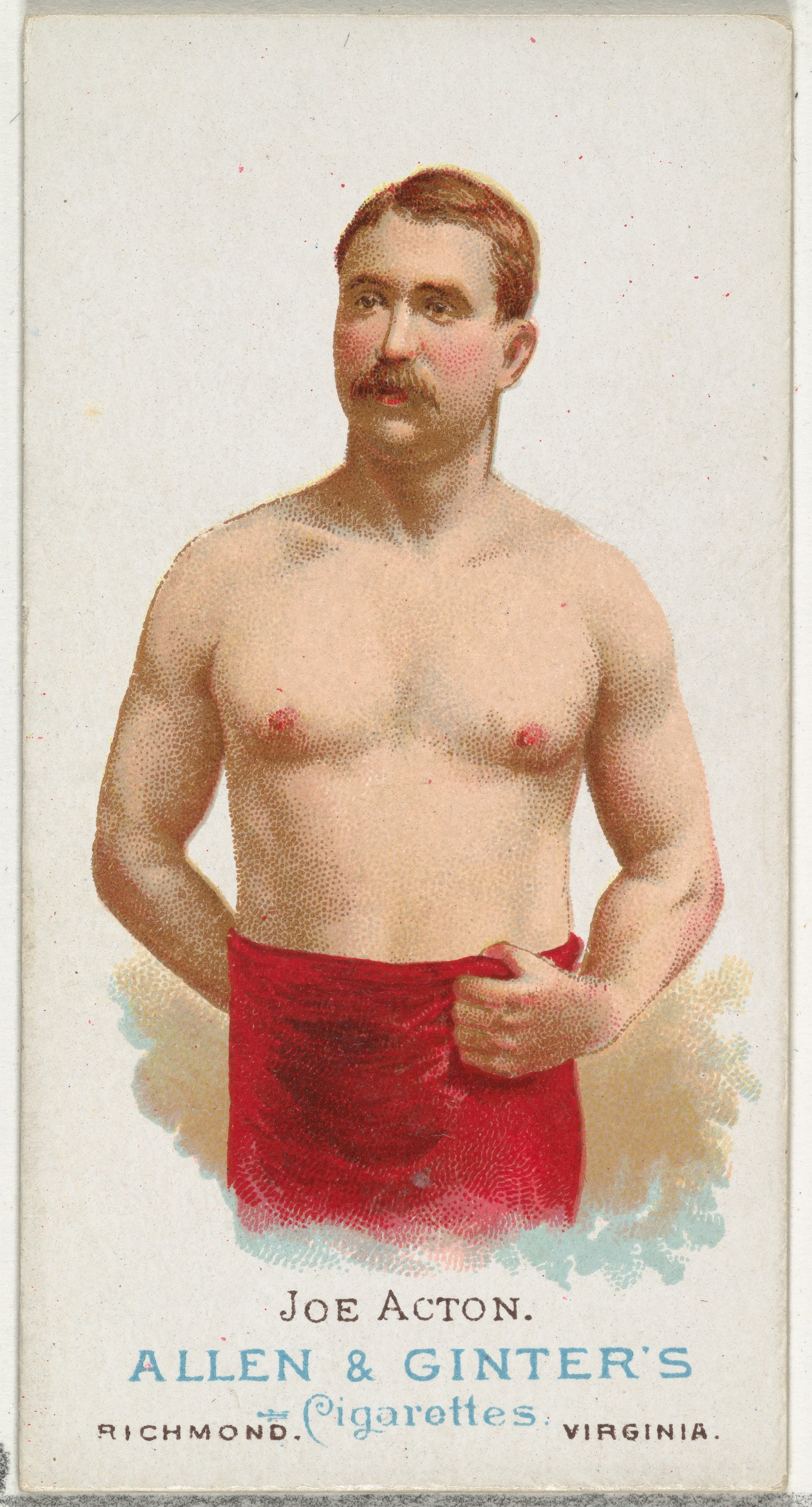
Joe Acton

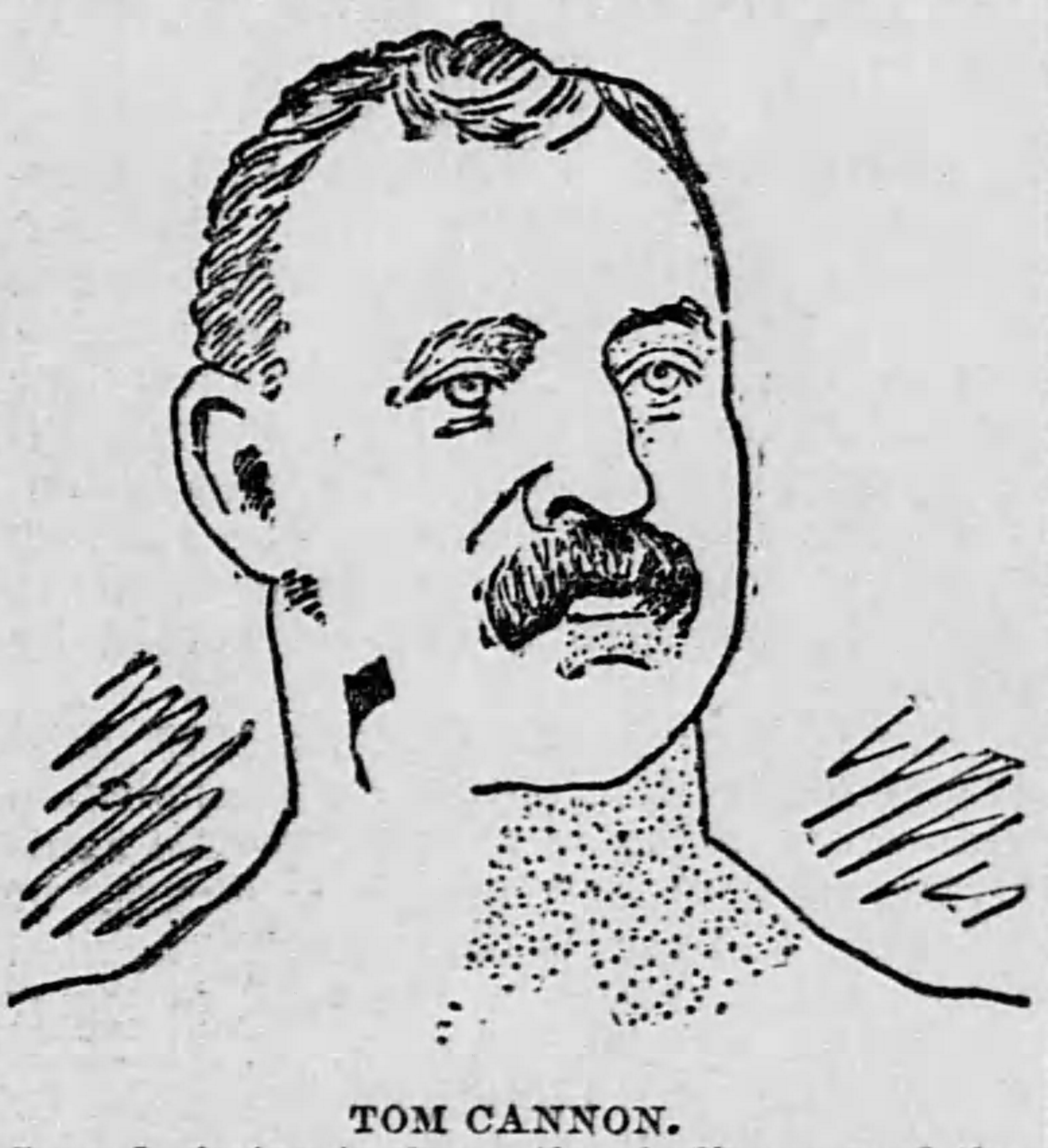
Tom Cannon

== Legacy ==
During its heyday, the Lancashire catch-as-catch-can style spread abroad through wrestlers like Joe Acton and Tom Cannon, becoming the most popular style in Great Britain, the United States, Canada, Australia, and other British colonies, and to other countries like Brazil and Japan. Besides freestyle wrestling, the Lancashire style was a primary influence on the development of theatrical professional wrestling, American collegiate wrestling, Brazilian luta livre and vale tudo, Japanese shoot wrestling and Shooto, and other styles such as mixed martial arts (MMA). As the Lancashire style declined, The Snake Pit (then known as Riley's Gym) in Wigan became one of the last sources. Its students, such as Karl Gotch and Billy Robinson, showcased and taught Riley's style to wrestlers and fighters across the globe. It became particularly popular in Japan, where catch wrestling is still commonly called "Lancashire style" (ランカシャースタイル). The Snake Pit began holding its own catch wrestling competitions and certifications in 2012, and held its first World Catch Wrestling Championships in 2018.

== See also ==
- Styles of wrestling
- Catch wrestling
- Collegiate wrestling and scholastic wrestling
- Freestyle wrestling
- Cornish wrestling and Devon wrestling
- Cumberland and Westmorland wrestling
