= Martin Burns =

American professional and amateur wrestler

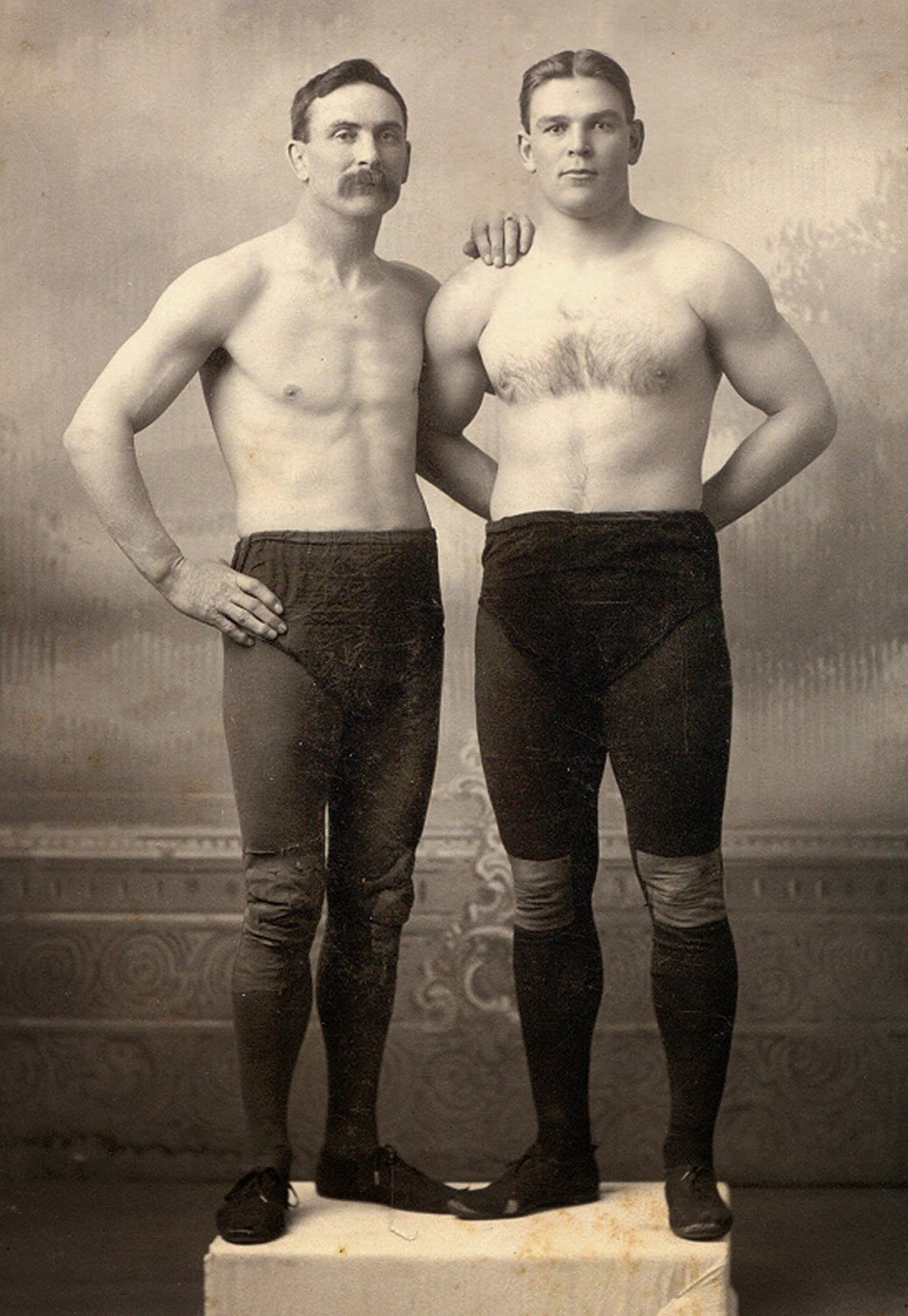
- Burns (left) with apprentice Frank Gotch, c. 1905

Personal information
- Born: February 15, 1861 Cedar County, Iowa, U.S.
- Died: January 8, 1937 (aged 75) Council Bluffs, Iowa, U.S.
- Spouse: Amelia Burns (d. 1930)
- Children: 3

Professional wrestling career
- Ring name(s): Martin Burns; Farmer Burns
- Billed weight: 165 lb (75 kg)
- Billed from: Springfield Township, Iowa
- Debut: 1879

Martin Burns (February 15, 1861 – January 8, 1937), nicknamed Farmer Burns, was an American catch wrestler, wrestling coach, and teacher. Born in Cedar County, Iowa, he started wrestling as a teenager and made money traveling around the Midwest wrestling in carnivals and fairs. As a professional wrestler, he claimed the American Heavyweight Championship by defeating Evan Lewis in 1895 and held the title for two years, during the time when contests were legitimate. At this time, Martin Burns himself claimed to have wrestled in more than 6,000 matches and is said to have lost only seven. After the end of his active wrestling career he started a successful wrestling school in Omaha and later coached Cedar Rapids' Washington high school to the first Iowa high school state wrestling tournament title. He died in Council Bluffs in 1937.

== Childhood ==
Martin Burns was born on February 15, 1861, in a log cabin on a farm in Cedar County, Iowa. Growing up amidst the Civil War, Burns was exposed at an early age to the sport of wrestling, which was a preferred activity among the soldiers while stationed in camp. Consequently, the sport's popularity further increased during the 1860s, and many historians also speculate that the added interest may be due to the fact that President Abraham Lincoln had himself been a wrestler in his younger years.

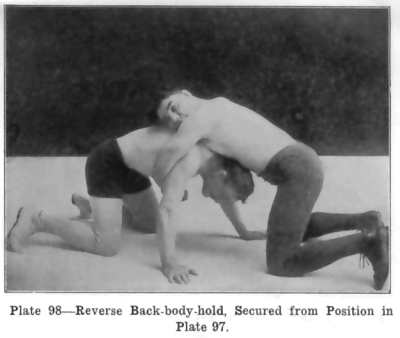
Reverse Back-body-hold as illustrated in Lessons in Wrestling & Physical Culture by Martin Burns.

Burns wrestled impromptu matches as a child; and at age 8, he tossed an older rival to claim a fifteen cent prize. His father died when he was 11, leaving him to support his mother, brother, and five sisters. To earn money, Burns worked at a nearby farm for $12 per month; and while he received little schooling, it was this physical labor that enabled Burns to develop his tremendous physical strength. He also spent time working in grading camps, where he competed in regular competitions against rugged strongmen. Burns spent much time meticulously perfecting the strategies and techniques of catch wrestling, which is a grappling style where various holds and tactics are used with the intent to either submit or pin both opponent's shoulders to the ground at once.

== Early career ==
By 1880, Martin Burns had developed a formidable reputation; and at 19, he wrestled his first match against a professional grappler when he battled David Grafft to a 2-hour and 19 minute draw. He then honed his skills against the top pro wrestlers of the day, losing decisions to Henry Clayton and Tom Connors in 1886 and 1887 respectively. The defeat to Clayton particularly irked Burns, as he was unable to offset the feared stranglehold that subsequently earned Clayton the moniker Evan “Strangler” Lewis (long before the more famous Ed “Strangler” Lewis was ever born). Consequently, Burns launched into a rigorous program of neck development; and soon built an immense 20” neck that possessed such strength that he could be dropped six feet on a hangman's noose to no effect (a stunt that Burns would often perform at carnivals and fairs).

While on a trip to Chicago in the spring of 1889, Burns saw a sign offering $25 to anyone who could last fifteen minutes against top grapplers Jack Carleek and Evan Lewis. Burns accepted the challenge and showed up at the Olympic Theater dressed in his regular farmer's overalls. Consequently, the event's announcer introduced Martin to the crowd as “Farmer” Burns; and the “Farmer” promptly made a monkey out of Carleek, throwing him across the stage before being declared the winner after fifteen minutes. The next challenge was Burns's much-awaited rematch against Evan “Strangler” Lewis, who was now the reigning Catch-as-Catch-Can Heavyweight Champion, having defeated Joe Acton on March 14, 1887. However, fifteen minutes proved not enough time for Lewis to throw Burns; and again, the unknown “Farmer” was declared the winner and was subsequently lauded as a wrestling hero the next day in Chicago newspapers.

== American Champion ==
Following Farmer Burns's emergence as a premier grappler, he traveled the country, taking on the greatest wrestlers of the day, while also beating all comers at carnivals. Though he weighed just 165 pounds, he regularly defeated men who outweighed him by as much as 50-100 pounds. At the time, professional catch-as-catch-can (freestyle) wrestling often used no time limit, and a match was usually decided when a wrestler “threw” his opponent to the ground. However, Burns became known as the master of the pinfall, as he perfected the art of trapping his opponents’ shoulders to the mat while contriving such dangerous maneuvers as the full and half-nelson, hammerlock, double-wrist lock, chicken wing, and a variety of submission toe holds.

Burns soon encountered the renowned Sorakichi Matsuda, who is regarded as Japan's first-ever pro wrestler, and who had been a top challenger to World Wrestling Champions William Muldoon and Ernest Roeber during the previous decade. The two faced off in Troy, New York on May 13, 1891, and Burns scored his biggest win yet when he pinned Matsuda in just four minutes. As a result, Burns soon became known as the world's premier all-around grappler; and between 1890 and 1893, he never lost a single fall. On March 2, 1893, Evan Lewis was recognized as wrestling's American Heavyweight Champion when he beat Ernest Roeber to unify the American Greco-Roman Heavyweight Championship with the Catch-As-Catch-Can Championship. This set up yet another rematch between Burns and Strangler Lewis; and on April 20, 1895, Burns pinned Lewis to capture the title. Burns would go on to reign as wrestling's American Champion for two years until he was finally beaten by Dan McLeod and Tom Jenkins in 1897.

Burns competed in many mixed style wrestling challenge matches, including Cornish wrestling during the 1890s and 1900s. He beat famous Cornish wrestlers such as Rowett, twice in 1899 and M J Dwyer in 1905, 1907 and 1908.

== Retirement and Post-Career ==
Nevertheless, Farmer Burns's greatest contribution to wrestling's evolution may be as a trainer. He opened a gymnasium in Rock Island, Illinois, in 1893, and helped to establish schools that enlightened young grapplers to the world of catch wrestling. In 1899, Burns defeated a 21-year-old Iowan named Frank Gotch, but he recognized his raw talent and recruited him as his prized student. Burns would then mold Gotch into perhaps the greatest wrestling champion of all time, as he defeated George Hackenschmidt in 1908 to claim the undisputed World Heavyweight Title.

In addition, Burns served as instructor to a myriad of grapplers who would transform the sport in the early 1900s, including future World Champion Earl Caddock, future Middleweight World Champion and Champion Wrestler of the A.E.F. Ralph Parcaut, as well as creative pioneer Joseph “Toots” Mondt. Other big names he personally trained included Rudy Dusek, Joe Malcewicz, Emil Klank, Fred Beell and Jack Sherry.

In 1914, Burns published a 96-page mail-order course entitled The Lessons in Wrestling and Physical Culture, which incorporated breathing techniques, calisthenics, stamina exercises, and Eastern martial arts principles, thus becoming the bible for all aspiring wrestlers during the early 1900s. Moreover, it is said that Ed “Strangler” Lewis, the great wrestling champion of the 1920s and 30s (and the eventual teacher of Lou Thesz) got his start in wrestling by following Burns's training methods. Consequently, it is because of Burns's many efforts that his native state of Iowa has subsequently become the nation's amateur wrestling capital, with the University of Iowa consistently serving as an NCAA powerhouse, and with the International Wrestling Institute and Museum also based in Newton.

== Legacy ==
In 2001, Burns was inducted into the International Wrestling Institute and Museum Hall of Fame. He was also inducted into the Wrestling Observer Newsletter Hall of Fame in 2002. The Professional Wrestling Hall of Fame inducted Burns in 2003. He was inducted into the WWE Hall of Fame in 2017. In 2024, he was inducted into the Nebraska Pro Wrestling Hall of Fame.

== Personal life ==
Burns had two sons, Raymond and Charlie, who became musicians in Chicago, and a daughter, Celia Burns Beem. He suffered the loss of his wife Amelia in 1930, which led to the deterioration of his own condition. At this point he went to live with his daughter, Celia, who died in 1951.

== Death ==
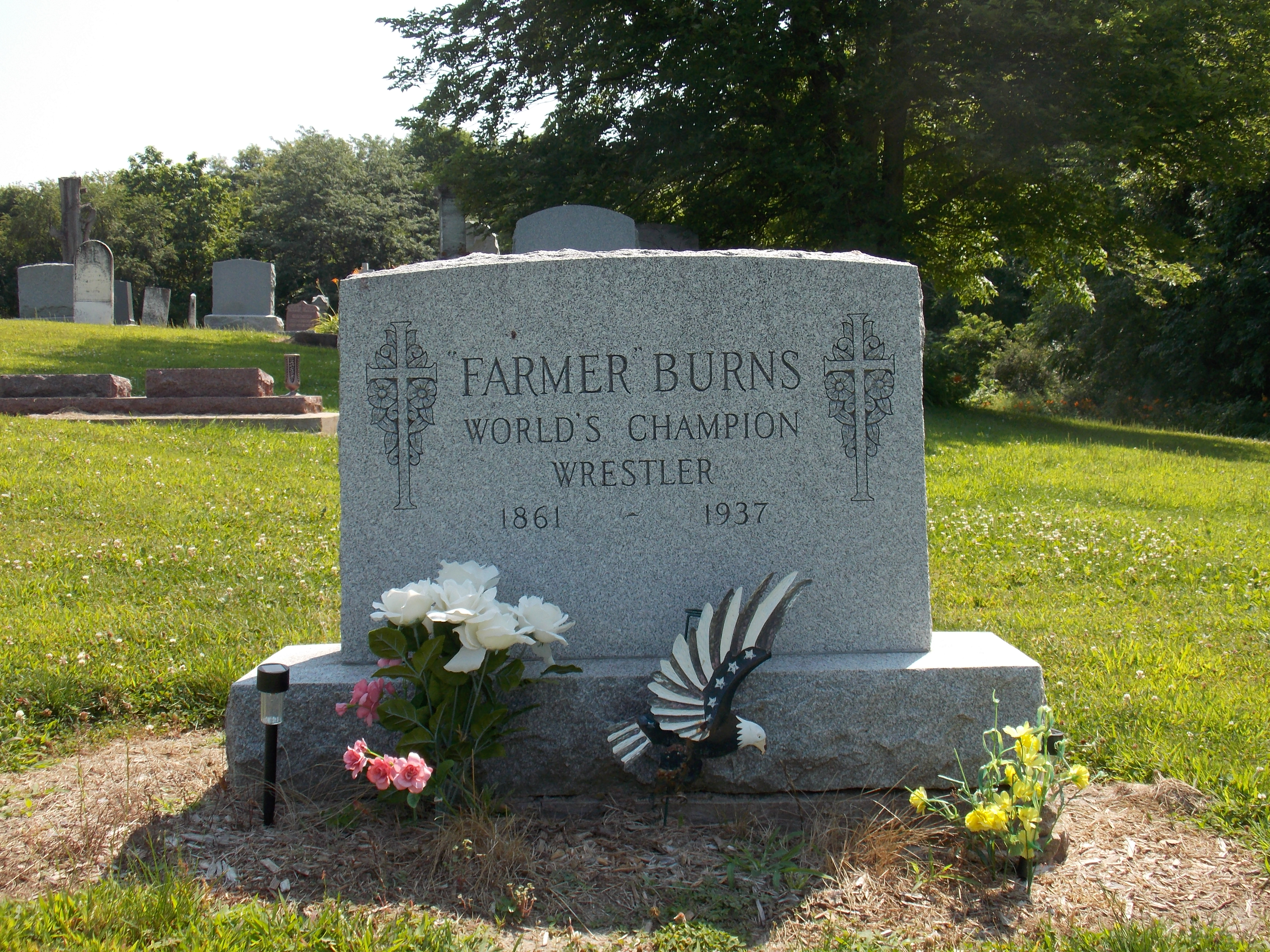
Farmer Burns grave in St. James Cemetery

Burns died on January 8, 1937, in Council Bluffs, Iowa at the age of 75. He was buried at the St. James Cemetery in Toronto, Iowa.

== Championships and accomplishments ==
- Catch wrestling
  - World Catch-as-Catch-Can Championship (1 time)
  - American Catch-as-Catch-can Championship (1 time)
- Clinton, Iowa's Walk of Fame
  - Class of 2025
- George Tragos/Lou Thesz Professional Wrestling Hall of Fame
  - Class of 2001
- Iowa Sports Hall of Fame

- Inducted by Des Moines Register in 1951

- International Professional Wrestling Hall of Fame
  - Class of 2021
- Professional Wrestling Hall of Fame

- Pioneer Era inductee in 2003

- Wrestling Observer Newsletter

- Wrestling Observer Newsletter Hall of Fame (Class of 2002)

- WWE

- WWE Hall of Fame (Class of 2017)

- Other titles
  - American Heavyweight Championship (1 time)
  - World Light Heavyweight Championship (2 times)

== Nicknames ==
- Farmer
- The Grandmaster of American Wrestling
