= Tom Cannon =

Tom Cannon may refer to:

- Tom Cannon (wrestler) (born 1852), British wrestler
- Tom Cannon Sr. (1846–1917), British flat racing jockey and trainer
- Tom Cannon (footballer) (born 2002), English-born Irish footballer
