= Dan McLeod (wrestler) =

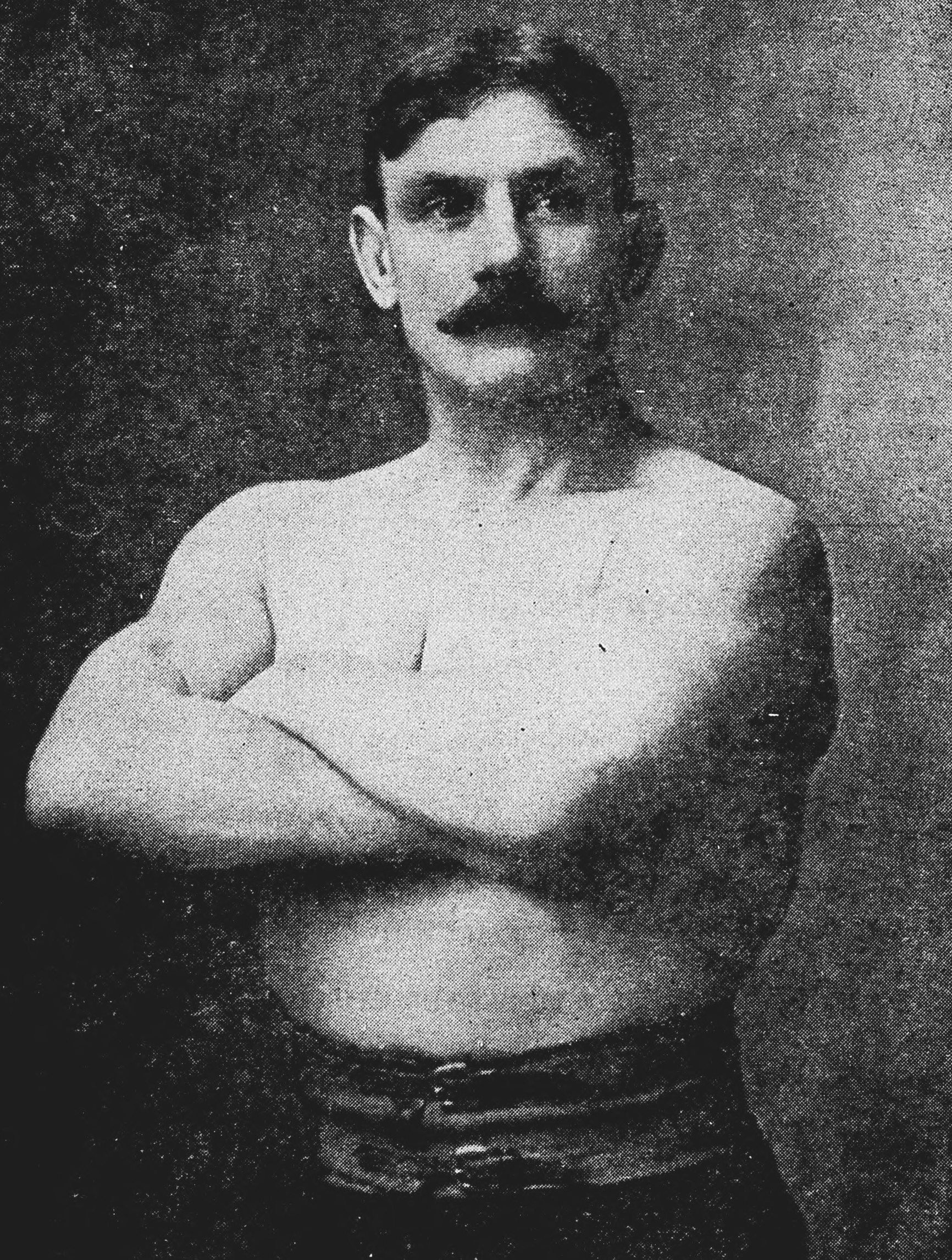
- McLeod in 1909

Personal information
- Born: Daniel S. McLeod; 14 June 1860 Canada
- Died: 20 June 1958 (aged 98) Temecula, California, U.S.

Professional wrestling career
- Ring name: George Little (sometimes)
- Billed height: 5 ft 6.5 in (1.69 m)
- Billed weight: 168 lb (76 kg)
- Debut: 1889
- Retired: 1913

Daniel Stuart McLeod (14 June 1860 – 20 June 1958) was a Canada-born American catch wrestler of the late nineteenth and early twentieth century, who held the American Heavyweight Championship twice. McLeod sometimes wrestled under the alias George Little. He worked as a miner in Nanaimo, British Columbia and wrestled his first match in 1889, winning the Pacific Coast heavyweight championship that same year.

On Thursday, 6 May 1897, Martin "Farmer" Burns gave McLeod his first chance at the American Heavyweight Title. The men met in Davenport, Iowa. 1,200 fans filled the Turner Opera House to watch the match. Burns won the first match, two falls to three. Dan McLeod complained about the referee and asked for a rematch. Burns agreed to a rematch. McLeod agreed to wrestle Burns' collaborator, D.A. McMillan, in Indianapolis's Grand Opera House on Thursday, 9 September 1897. McLeod won the match which set him up for a rematch with Martin "Farmer" Burns. On 26 October 1897, McLeod beat Burns and won the American Heavyweight Championship, which he would retain for four years. On 18 June 1899, McLeod wrestled and defeated a young Frank Gotch in a hard-fought impromptu match on a cinder track. It was Gotch's first professional match and he later recounted that McLeod had hustled all involved by pretending to be a simple furniture dealer from a neighboring town, but was sufficiently impressed by Gotch's talent to leave him a visiting card revealing his true identity. Gotch went on to defeat McLeod on multiple occasions after much training under Burns.

McLeod's reign as champion came to an end on 7 November 1901, when he was defeated by Tom Jenkins. Amid a series of rematches between the two men, McLeod recaptured the title on Christmas Day 1902 but lost it to Jenkins the following April at Broadway Arsenal.

After retiring in 1912, McLeod worked as a wrestling instructor at the Los Angeles Athletic Club.

McLeod died on 20 June 1958 in Temecula, California at the age of 98.

== See also ==
- List of oldest surviving professional wrestlers

== Championships and accomplishments ==
=== Catch wrestling ===
- Independent
  - World Catch-as-Catch-Can Championship (1 time)
  - American Catch-as-Catch-can Championship (1 time)

=== Professional Wrestling ===
- Independent
  - American Heavyweight Championship (2 times)
- International Professional Wrestling Hall of Fame
  - Class of 2023
