= Carl Abs =

German professional wrestler

Personal information
- Born: Carl Johann Theodor Abs; September 12, 1851 Groß Godems, Grand Duchy of Mecklenburg-Schwerin
- Died: February 18, 1895 (aged 43) Hamburg, Germany
- Spouse: Maria Augusta Katharina Warncke (m. 1877)
- Family: Carl Abs Sr. (Father); Sophie Abs (nee Jürgens) (Mother)

Professional wrestling career
- Ring name(s): Carl Abs; Karl Abs; The German Oak
- Billed height: 184 cm (6 ft 0 in)
- Billed weight: 103 kg (227 lb)
- Billed from: Hamburg; Denmark
- Trained by: Jean Doublier
- Debut: 1880
- Retired: December 26, 1894

Carl Johann Theodor Abs, generally referred to as Carl Abs (September 12, 1851, in Groß Godems, Grand Duchy of Mecklenburg-Schwerin – February 18, 1895, in Hamburg), also known as "The German Oak", was a German professional wrestler who is considered the founder of modern professional wrestling in Germany. His life and work both inside and outside the ring attracted great public interest in the late 19th century. In 1891 a book about the life of Carl Abs as a championship wrestler and a champion for the poor was published called Carl Abs, der Meisterschafts-Ringer der Welt: Sein Leben u. Wirken ("Carl Abs, the wrestling Champion of the world: his life and work").

== Personal life ==
Carl Johann Theodor Abs was the son of Carl and Sophie Abs (née Jürgens) in Groß Godems, in the Grand Duchy of Mecklenburg-Schwerin. As the son of a Carpenter the younger Carl Abs learned his fathers craft and the intention was for his to succeed him in the business. Showing little interest in school Abs was more interested in farm work and through this discovered a keen interest in the environment. Later in his life his family moved to Hamburg. In Hamburg he began working in a factory in Langenstein. In 1873 he did his military service with the 76th Infantry Regiment. At the time military service was a three-year ordeal, but through devotion to duty and punctuality Abs had his service time shortened by two years. Following his discharge he began working at a wine shop and later became a coach driver. When business turned bad Abs lost his job and returned to Groß Godems, visiting his ill father before his father died. In 1877 he met Maria Augusta Katharina Warncke and married her later that year.

== Professional wrestling career ==
In 1880 Abs wrestled his first wrestling match, challenging "Iron Wilhem", the two wrestled to a draw in the first match and Abs won the rematch. Spurred by the fights Abs wanted to pursue a career in wrestling, which at the time was more of a side-show attraction than anything else. In 1881 he opened a gym in the basement of an art school. In 1882 he won a medal for his feats of strength. Due to his initial success he caught the attention of several German circus owners. Working with circus ringmaster Renz he toured German performing feats of strength as well as wrestle on occasion. After touring with the circus he returned to Hamburg where he wrestled against Mathias Sobien and Willy Henry. In 1885 worked for Circus Blumenthal, introducing the concept of professional wrestling to cities such as Karlsruhe. With professional wrestling still being more of a side show than anything else Abs decided to tour the United States, hoping to learn from American promotions and wrestlers to improve the wrestling scene in Germany. In the United States he defeated the Japanese wrestler Sorakichi Matsuda as well as Edwin Bibby. He even defeated the high ranking William Muldoon in a match. Upon his return to Germany he resumed working in the circus performing strongman acts but also wrestled in several cities, turning back the challenge of Gustav Bachmann and Frenchman Piere Rigal twice. Working for Circus d'hiver Abs toured in France, where he was actually billed as being from Denmark to not have to face any German/French tension that had been building, but the deception only lasted for a short while before his true background was revealed. On July 25, 1891, Carl Abs defeated Tom Cannon to win the European Greco-Roman Heavyweight Championship, one of the earliest recognized championships in wrestling. After wrestling in Germany he traveled to Vienna, Austria working for Circus Schumann as well as wrestling against local champion Cheri Robinet. The first meeting between the two ended in a draw. Later he fought French wrestler Masson, in a match where the referee ruled it a draw. In January 1893 Abs fought and defeated Antonio Pierri in Altona, Hamburg, but Pierri contested the loss, claiming that he was not thrown by Abs but merely slipped. The controversial ending led to a rematch between the two, which Pierri won, leading to a third and deciding match between the two. The match was originally scheduled for February 9, but had to be postponed when Pierri suffered a dislocated shoulder. When the two finally met on March 9, 1893, Abs threw his opponent and won the match in only 16 minutes.

== Retirement and death ==
Following his victory over Pierrie, Carl Abs gradually withdrew from the ring and focused more on weightlifting. He had his last match on December 26, 1894. In January 1895, he became ill with liver and kidney disease, as well as dropsy. Abs died on February 18, 1895, in Hamburg after a month-long battle with his illness. At the time of his death, his daughter was 17 years old, and his son was 13. On February 22, 1895, he was buried in the Ohlsdorf cemetery in Hamburg.

== Legacy ==
The county of Groß Godems named a street after Carl Abs in 2002. The road connects a freight route to a new housing estate and bears Abs' name. Since 2008 project "Diversity - absolutely fair" has been active, a volunteer organization of youth workers who help train kids and teenagers for free, teaching them to socialize with other kids and adults but without having to pay a fee. This project awards a "Carl Abs" Cup each year.

== Championships and accomplishments ==
- Greco-Roman wrestling
  - European Greco-Roman Heavyweight Championship (1 time)

== Literature ==
- Bürger, Hilmar (1985). Kraftproben: Starke Männer einst und jetzt (in German). Sportverlag Berlin.
- Hasperg, Heinrich. Ein Jahrhundert Sport in Hamburg (in German). Hamburg, Br. Sachse o. J.
- Graumann, Helmut (1999). 100 bedeutende Mecklenburger und Vorpommern' (in German). Reinhard Thon, Schwerin.
