= Sam Hurst =

Sam Hurst (13 March 1832 – 22 May 1882), nicknamed the Stalybridge Infant in ironic reference to his considerable physical size, was the English bare-knuckle boxing champion 1860–61. He was born in Marsden, in Yorkshire, England, but in 1857 moved to Stalybridge, where he took a job in the local iron foundry and worked as a bouncer at the White House public house. Hurst was also a notable Lancashire wrestler.

Hurst won the English championship in his first bare-knuckle fight by defeating Tom Paddock at Aldermaston on 6 November 1861, in a contest that lasted five rounds. Paddock was suffering from the effects of a knife wound, and was unable to continue after being knocked down by a punch that broke three of his ribs. Hurst's prize money of £400 is equivalent to about £29,000 as of 2010. (Note: Comparing the relative purchasing power of £400 in 1860 with 2010.) His next fight was against Jem Mace at Medway Island on 18 June 1861. At 6 feet 2.5 inches (1.9 m) Hurst was five inches taller than his opponent, and correspondingly heavier, (Note: Hurst's weight is variously given as 14 stone 12 pounds (94 kg), or 15–17 stone (95–108 kg).) but he was not a skillful boxer and was no match for Mace's speed and agility. Hurst's seconds withdrew him from the fight in the eighth round, and he never fought again except in exhibition matches.

A month after the unsuccessful defence of his title Hurst married the daughter of a Manchester publican, and in 1862 became landlord of the Wilton Arms in Shudehill, Manchester. He also took over the management of the beerhouse in the Botanical Gardens at Hyde in 1865, and the following year became landlord of the Glass House tavern in Manchester, where he remained until 1871.

By 1881 Hurst was recorded as being a shoemaker; he died in poverty the following year, aged 50.
