= Charles Cutler (wrestler) =

American professional wrestler

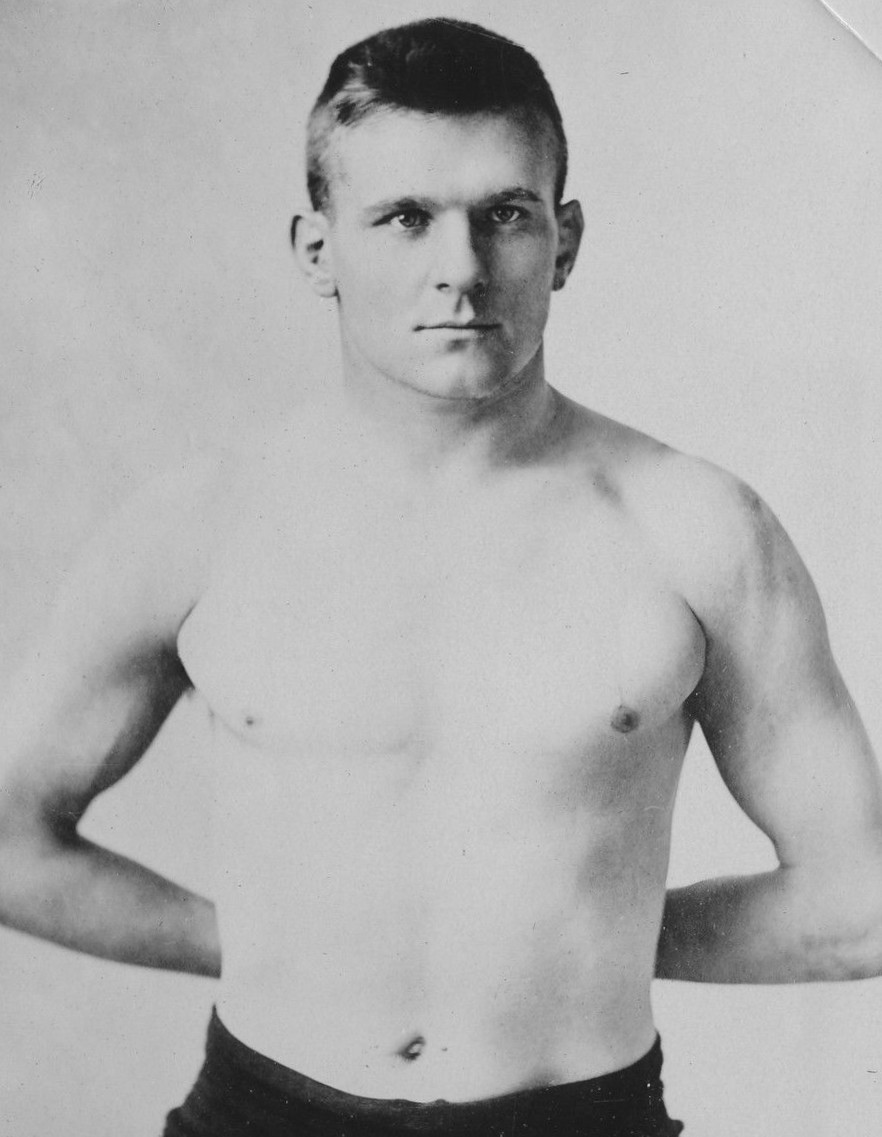
- Cutler circa 1910

Personal information
- Born: Charles Olsen; February 2, 1884 Coopersfield, Michigan, U.S.
- Died: December 25, 1952 (aged 68) Paw Paw, Michigan, U.S.
- Spouse: Marie Cutler
- Family: 4 siblings

Professional wrestling career
- Ring name(s): Charles Cutler, Charles Cuttler, Charley Cutler, Charlie Cutler, Kid Cutler
- Billed height: 6 ft 0 in (1.83 m)
- Billed weight: 225 lb (102 kg)
- Trained by: Frank Gotch; Jack Coleman
- Debut: 1906
- Retired: 1927

Charles Cutler (born Charles Olsen; February 2, 1884 – December 25, 1952), sometimes spelled Charles Cuttler, was an American professional wrestler and three time American Heavyweight Champion and one time World Heavyweight Champion .

== Championships and accomplishments ==
- Professional wrestling
  - American Heavyweight Championship (3 times)
  - American Mixed Style Championship (1 time)
  - World Heavyweight Wrestling Championship (1 time)
