= International Professional Wrestling Hall of Fame =

Professional and amateur wrestling hall of fame

- Formation: 2019 (7 years ago)
- Members: 83 total inductees
- Website: International Professional Wrestling Hall of Fame

The International Professional Wrestling Hall of Fame (IPWHF) is an American professional wrestling hall of fame and museum that is located in Albany, New York, at the MVP Arena.

== History ==
The museum was founded by Seth Turner, Tony Vellano, the founder of Professional Wrestling Hall of Fame and Museum, Michael Viscosi, Andrew Groff, Joe Defino, and Mike Lanuto on December 10, 2019. Seth Turner was named the President of the IPWHF and Tony Vellano was named Vice President of Talent and Community Relations. The launching of the IPWHF began after the New York State Board of Regents approved a provisional charter for the new hall. Its purpose is to "ensure the contributions to professional wrestling by individuals from various backgrounds and diverse cultures will be highlighted in the establishment". IPWHF declared itself a nonprofit organization.

On May 24, 2020, IPWHF announced that they have acquired Bruno Sammartino's WWWF World Heavyweight Championship, which was later known as “Bruno’s Belt”, and would be displayed at their museum.

== Members ==
=== Class of 2021 ===
Ring name (Birth name)	Nationality	Notes	Ref.
André the Giant (André Roussimoff)	(France)	Posthumous inductee	
Antonio Inoki	(Japan)	Posthumous inductee	
Bruno Sammartino	(Italy) / (United States)	Posthumous inductee	
Buddy Rogers (Herman Rohde Jr.)	(United States)	Posthumous inductee	
Danny Hodge	(United States)	Posthumous inductee	
Ed Lewis (Robert Friedrich)	(United States)	Posthumous inductee	
Evan Lewis	(United States)	Posthumous inductee	
Frank Gotch	(United States)	Posthumous inductee	
George Hackenschmidt (Georg Hackenschmidt)	(Russian Empire)	Posthumous inductee	
Giant Baba (Shohei Baba)	(Japan)	Posthumous inductee	
The Great Gama (Ghulam Butt)	(British Raj)	Posthumous inductee	
Hulk Hogan (Terry Bollea)	(United States)		
Lou Thesz (Aloysius Thesz)	(United States)	Posthumous inductee	
Martin Burns	(United States)	Posthumous inductee	
Mil Máscaras (Aarón Arellano)	(Mexico)		
Paul Pons	(France)	Posthumous inductee	
Ric Flair (Richard Fliehr)	(United States)		
Rikidōzan (Mitsuhiro Momota)	(Korea under Japanese rule)	Posthumous inductee	
Satoru Sayama	(Japan)		
Stanislaus Zbyszko (Stanisław Cyganiewicz)	(Austria-Hungary)	Posthumous inductee	
Tatsumi Fujinami	(Japan)		
Terry Funk (Terrance Funk)	(United States)		
William Muldoon	(United States)	Posthumous inductee	
Yusuf İsmail	(Ottoman Empire)	Posthumous inductee	

Name	Nationality	Notes	Ref.
2021 Special Honors
Drew Hale	(United States)	Rocky Johnson Medal of Mettle	
Andy Kaufman	(United States)	Posthumous inductee Entertainer and performance artist Excelsior Award	
Rita Chatterton	(United States)	Referee; Trailblazer Award	

=== Class of 2022 ===
Ring name (Birth name)	Nationality	Notes	Ref.
Aleksander Aberg	(Russian Empire)	Posthumous inductee	
Billy Robinson (William Robinson)	(United Kingdom)	Posthumous inductee	
Dory Funk Jr. (Dorrance Funk)	(United States)		
Fred Beell (Friedrich Beell)	(Germany) / (United States)	Posthumous inductee	
Genichiro Tenryu (Genichiro Shimada)	(Japan)		
Jim Londos (Christos Theofilou)	(Greece)	Posthumous inductee	
Joe Stecher	(United States)	Posthumous inductee	
Karl Gotch (Charles Istaz)	(Belgium)	Posthumous inductee	
Mildred Burke (Mildred Bliss)	(United States)	Posthumous inductee	
Riki Choshu (Kwak Kwang-Woong)	(South Korea) / (Japan)		
Stone Cold Steve Austin (Steven Williams)	(United States)		
Tom Cannon	(United Kingdom)	Posthumous inductee	
Tom Jenkins	(United States)	Posthumous inductee	

Name	Nationality	Notes	Ref.
2022 Special Honors
Anthony DiPippo	(United States)	Excelsior Award	
Azaliah Farkas	(United States)	Rocky Johnson Medal of Mettle	
Dan Severn	(United States)	Trailblazer Award	

=== Class of 2023 ===
Ring name (Birth name)	Nationality	Notes	Ref.
Ben Roller (Benjamin Roller)	(United States)	Posthumous inductee	
Bert Assirati (Bartolomeo Assirati)	(United Kingdom)	Posthumous inductee	
Bret Hart	(Canada)		
Bob Backlund (Robert Backlund)	(United States)		
Bobo Brazil (Houston Harris)	(United States)	Posthumous inductee	
Dan McLeod (Daniel McLeod)	(United Kingdom)	Posthumous inductee	
Georg Lurich	(Russian Empire)	Posthumous inductee	
Gorgeous George (George Wagner)	(United States)	Posthumous inductee	
The Great Muta (Keiji Muto)	(Japan)		
Kenta Kobashi	(Japan)		
June Byers (DeAlva Sibley)	(United States)	Posthumous inductee	
Mitsuharu Misawa (Mitsuharu Kotake)	(Japan)	Posthumous inductee	
Ron Simmons (Ronald Simmons)	(United States)		
Sweet Daddy Siki (Reginald James)	(United States) / (Canada)		
Tom Connors	(United Kingdom)	Posthumous inductee	
Verne Gagne (Laverne Gagne)	(United States)	Posthumous inductee	

Name	Nationality	Notes	Ref.
2023 Special Honors
Dave LaGreca	(United States)	Radio personality Excelsior Award	
Christine Jarrett	(United States)	Posthumous inductee Promoter; Trailblazer Award	
Joe Defino	(United States)	Rocky Johnson Medal of Mettle	

=== Class of 2024 ===
Ring name (Birth name)	Nationality	Notes	Ref.
Ad Santel (Adolph Ernst)	(Germany) / (United States)	Posthumous inductee	
Dusty Rhodes (Virgil Runnels Jr.)	(United States)	Posthumous inductee	
Harley Race	(United States)	Posthumous inductee	
Jack Brisco (Freddie Brisco)	(United States)	Posthumous inductee	
Kurt Angle	(United States)		
El Santo (Rodolfo Huerta)	(Mexico)	Posthumous inductee	

Name	Nationality	Notes	Ref.
2024 Special Honors
Bill Apter (William Apter)	(United States)	Journalist; Excelsior Award	
Korey Wise (Kharey Wise)	(United States)	Activist; Rocky Johnson Medal of Mettle	
Mario Savoldi	(United States)	Trailblazer Award	

=== Class of 2025 ===
Ring name (Birth name)	Nationality	Notes	Ref.
Johnny Rodz (John Rodriguez)	(United States)		
Rocky Johnson (Wayde Bowles) and Tony Atlas (Anthony White)	(Canada) / (United States)		
Tito Santana (Merced Solis)	(United States)		
Trish Stratus (Patricia Stratigeas)	(Canada)		

=== Class of 2026 ===
Ring name (Birth name)	Nationality	Notes	Ref.
Bushwhacker Luke (Brian Wickens)	(New Zealand)		
George Napolitano	(United States)	Photographer	
Gene LeBell (Ivan LeBell)	(United States)	Posthumous inductee	
Marc Mero	(United States)		
Roddy Piper (Roderick Toombs)	(Canada)	Posthumous inductee	
Tommy Rich (Thomas Richardson)	(United States)		
Wendi Richter (Victoria Richter)	(United States)		

== See also ==
- List of professional wrestling conventions
