= Jack Carkeek =

American sport wrestler

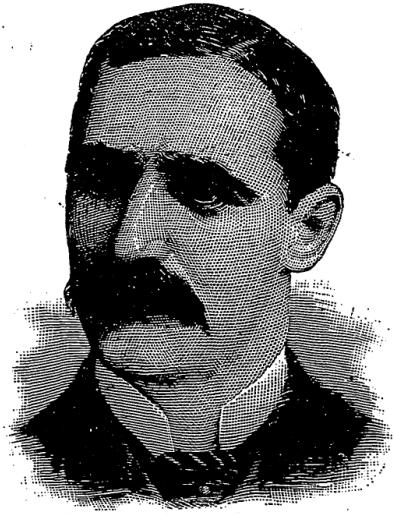

Personal information
- Born: January 22, 1861 Rockland, Michigan, United States
- Died: March 12, 1924 (aged 63) Havana, Cuba

Professional wrestling career
- Billed height: 5 ft 10 in (178 cm)
- Billed weight: 180 lb (82 kg)
- Debut: July 5, 1877

Jack Carkeek (January 22, 1861 – March 12, 1924) was an American wrestler from Rockland, Michigan. He was a champion in Cornish wrestling and Lancashire catch-as-catch-can wrestling. He died March 12, 1924, in Havana, Cuba.

He was the son of Tom Carkeek and his mother was first cousin to the actor Sir Henry Irving. Tom was born in Plain-an-Gwarry, Redruth in Cornwall was said to weigh 17 stone, was a champion of Cornish wrestling in the 1860s and was the world Cornish wrestling champion in 1875. It was said that he won 528 consecutive Cornish wrestling matches without defeat and won 88 prizes.

Jack made his first appearance at Michigamme, Michigan, on July 5, 1877, at age 16. There, he won the fourth prize in a tournament of 64 entries. In 1887, Jack Carkeek and John Pearce (the Cornish champion from Cornwall for five years) met for the World Championship of Cornish wrestling in Redruth, Cornwall.

== Wrestling career ==
Up until 1882, he wrestled just in Michigan, and then afterwards in Wisconsin, Iowa and Montana. At the beginning, he wrestled in tournaments, with a dozen or so other wrestlers, while later only wrestling in challenge matches for side money. In September 1887, The Cornishman newspaper considered the challenges a ″farce, except in a business sense, that no one takes the least notice of these illusory wordy bravadoes.″

He also fought under the name Jack O'Brien.

=== 1884 ===
- March 4, defeated Nels Stone at Peterson, Iowa, for $100 each
- September, defeated William Harrison, at Kinsley, Iowa
- December 10, Carkeek defeated James Pascoe, the champion Cornish wrestler of the Pacific Coast, for a purse of $500, in Butte, Montana.

=== 1885 ===
- January 1, defeated Sam Snell in the Cornish style for $100
- January 10, Carkeek defeated D A McMillan of Bodie, California, in a mixed match of five styles, for $250 a side at Butte City.
- February 28, he defeated H C Bell in Darlington, Wisconsin, for $500 a side, in the Cornish style.
- April 26, in San Francisco, California, Carkeek was defeated by Tom Cannon, the great champion, in mixed matches consisting of six styles.
- June 20, he defeated O H Ingraham in Antioch, California, in the "catch-as-catch-can" style for $100 a side.
- July 4, he won first prize in a tournament against 34 competitors at Grass Valley, California.
- November 25, beat J D Cudihee of Leadville, Colorado for $250 a side.

=== 1886 ===
- February 6, at Leadville, he defeated R Holcombe of Grass Valley, California in collar and elbow for $100 a side.
- July 14, in Dodgeville, Wisconsin, Carkeek wrestled Sorakichi Matsuda, from Japan, for $500 a side (in both Greco-Roman wrestling and catch-as-catch-can wrestling) and won in 54 minutes.
- July 29, defeated Sorakichi Matsuda, a second time for $250 a side in Milwaukee.
- August 21, beat Ben Roddle in catch-as-catch-can for $250 at Sioux Falls, South Dakota
- November 7, at Ishpenning, Michigan, beat J Stephens in Cornish wrestling for the gate receipts.
- December 1, defeated Pat McHugh in catch-as-catch-can at Iron Mountain.
- December 20, defeated Joe Trudell in Cornish wrestling.

=== 1887 ===
- January 2, at Hurley, Wisconsin beat J P Donnor in catch-as-catch-can for $100 a side.
- January 12, wrestled J P Donnor, agreeing to throw him five times in an hour, but lost having thrown him four times.
- May 9, defeated Bert Schiller at catch-as-catch-can in Milwaukee.
- 4 July, fought John Pearce of Wendron, Cornwall, at the Recreation Ground, Redruth, Cornwall for £100 a side. The result is disputed as to whether Carkeek won or the match was a draw. On 8 July, they quarrelled in Redruth with Carkeek biting Pearce's ear and Carkeek cut on the face by a broken glass.
- 1 August, wrestling match for 'the championship of the world' at Redruth Recreation Ground against Hancock. The result was two falls each and no result. Many of the crowd entered the ring accusing the wrestlers of ″faggoting″, i.e. match fixing.
- 20 August, defeated Thomas Bragg, the 'champion of England' at St James's Hall, Plymouth. Carkeek injured his thumb and broke a rib. A match against Rundle on 3 September was postponed.
- 6 October, there was no result in the return match against Thomas Bragg at St Jame's Hall, Plymouth, following a dispute on the number of falls.
- 28 October, beat the champion of England Samuel Rundle of St Blazey, which was disputed by Rundle who refused to hand over his share of the prizemoney.
- 1 December, At St Stephen Hall, Westminster, Carkeek beat J Smith from Cornwall, who was the champion of London. Best of five falls, Carkeek won three in succession to win the match.

=== 1888 ===
- 17 February, lost to Muldoon, the Greco-Roman wrestler.

=== 1889 ===
- 28 January, beat Conners in Milwaukee for $250 each and the gate money and claimed the championship of the world.

== Championships and accomplishments ==
- Catch wrestling
  - American Catch-as-Catch-Can Championship (1 time)
  - European Catch-as-Catch-Can Championship (1 time)
  - World Catch-as-Catch-Can Championship (1 time)
- Cornish wrestling
  - World Cornish wrestling champion: 1886
  - World Cornish wrestling champion: 1887
  - American Cornish wrestling champion: 1887
  - World Cornish wrestling champion: 1889
  - World Cornish wrestling champion: 1901
  - World Cornish wrestling champion: 1904
  - World Cornish wrestling champion: 1905

== Match fixing ==
In 1888 he was arrested in Chicago for two counts of swindling by means of a fake contests. Carkeek was a member of a swindling crew known as the Mabray gang. In 1910, while using the name of Jack Fletcher, he was arrested in San Francisco for participation in the fixing of wrestling matches. Carkeek spent two years in prison before the case was ultimately dismissed. In 1913 he pleaded guilty to attempted swindling and was sentenced to 6 months.
