= Edwin Bibby =

British-born American professional wrestler (1848–1905)

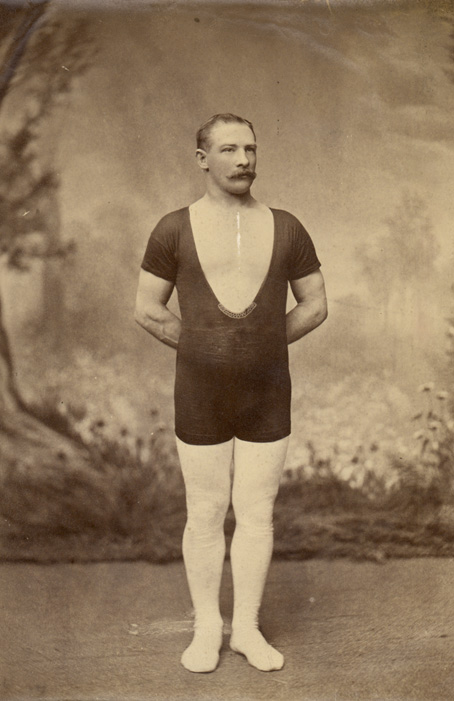
- Bibby in 1884

Personal information
- Born: 15 November 1848 Ashton-under-Lyne, England, United Kingdom
- Died: 5 May 1905 (aged 56) Fall River, Massachusetts, United States

Professional wrestling career
- Ring name: Edwin Bibby
- Billed height: 5 ft 4 in (1.63 m)
- Billed weight: 155 lb (70 kg)
- Debut: 1872
- Retired: 1887

Edwin Bibby (15 November 1848 – 5 May 1905) was an English wrestling champion during the 1870s and 1880s. He was a popular catch-as-catch-can style wrestler in his generation. He became the first American Heavyweight Champion in 1881 with a victory over Duncan C. Ross. During his career he was also known as Ned and Eddie.

== Early life in England ==
Bibby was born in Ashton-under-Lyne, Lancashire, United Kingdom on 15 November 1848. He married Mary Ann Connelly (age 16) in 1867. They had 13 children, only three of whom survived. He began working as a coal miner in 1871.

Bibby began his wrestling career in 1872 and quickly became a top wrestler. He performed for Queen Victoria in Prince Albert's Court in London.

== Life in America ==
In 1879 he immigrated to America and later sent for his family. He lived in New York and later Rhode Island and became a naturalized citizen in 1900.

On 19 January 1881, Bibby became the first American Heavyweight Champion with his victory over Duncan C. Ross. He lost that title the next year, on 7 August 1882, to Joe Acton in New York City.

Bibby's final wrestling match was against Sorakichi Matsuda, whom he defeated on 28 October 1887, in Buffalo, New York. On 5 May 1905, Bibby died from rheumatism at the age of 56. He is buried in Saint Patrick's Cemetery in Bristol, Fall River, Massachusetts alongside his wife Mary Ann who died in 1929 and their son Thomas who died in 1950.

Bibby's son Tom donated the Championship silver belt that can allegedly still be found at a Lancashire museum.

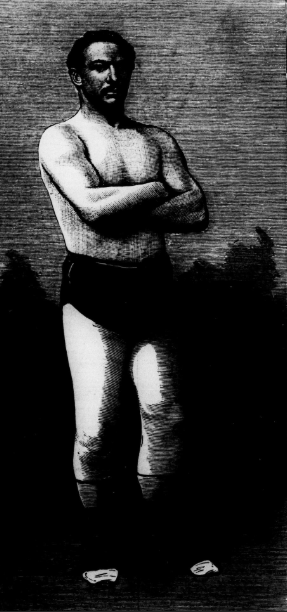
Illustration of Edwin Bibby

== Notable opponents ==
- Duncan C. Ross: Bibby became the first American Heavyweight Champion on 19 January 1881.
- Clarence Whistler: Drew to Clarence Whistler twice, 19 November 1880, and 21 December 1880. He lost to Whistler on 8 June 1883.
- William Muldoon: Lost to Muldoon 2–0 on 2 March 1881.
- Joe Acton: Lost to Acton in 38 minutes on 7 August 1882.
- Carl Abs: Lost to Carl Abs in Germany on 30 April 1885.
- Sorakichi Matsuda: Defeated Sorakichi in his final fight, 28 October 1887.

== Championships and accomplishments ==
- Catch wrestling
  - American Catch-as-Catch-can Championship (1 time)
- Professional Wrestling
  - American Heavyweight Championship (1 time)
  - World Heavyweight Championship (Great Britain version) (1 time)
  - World Middleweight Championship (National Wrestling Association) (1 time)
