= Duncan C. Ross =

Scottish wrestler (1855–1919)

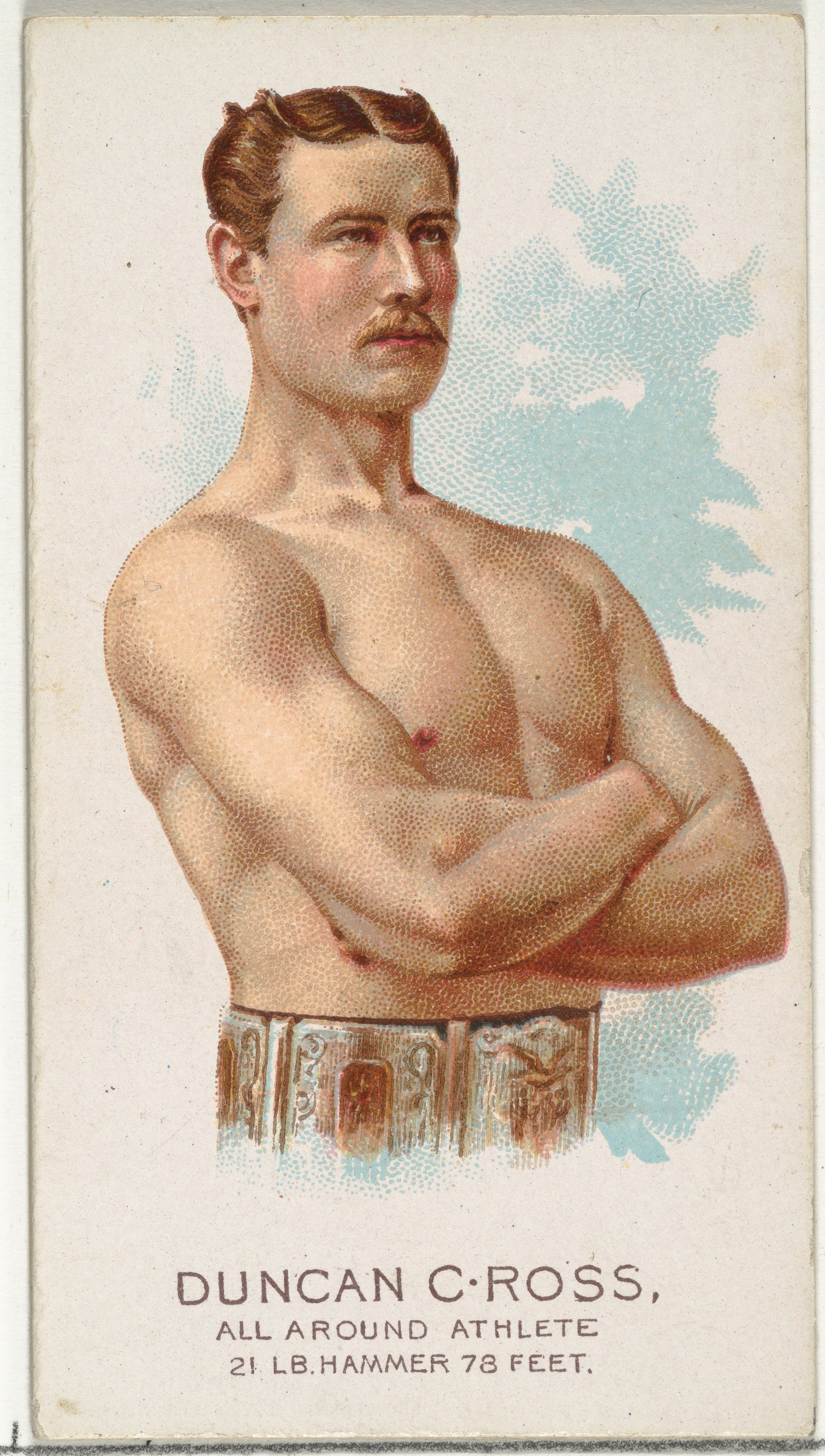
- Ross displayed on a cigarette card by Allen & Ginter, 1888

Personal information
- Born: Glasgow, Scotland

Professional wrestling career
- Ring name: Duncan C. Ross
- Billed from: Glasgow, Scotland

Duncan C. Ross (March 16, 1855 – September 8, 1919) was a wrestler starting around 1879, and was born in Glasgow, Scotland. His fame extending across north america many in the states and Canada knew him as the police chief of Cobourg, Ontario and the champion of the dominion. He lost to Catch as Can Style Wrestling Champion Edwin Bibby in 1881 for the American Heavyweight Championship.

He was a famous Scotch athlete who was the Cornish wrestling champion of New Zealand in 1891. He also fought in mixed style challenge matches including Cornish wrestling in the US in the 1890s. He also claimed the all round championship at wrestling and weight throwing.

== Championships and accomplishments ==
  - American Heavyweight Championship (1 time)
  - American/World Graeco-Roman Championship
  - American/World Mixed Style Championship
  - American Collar-and-Elbow Championship
  - Cornish wrestling champion of New Zealand in 1891.

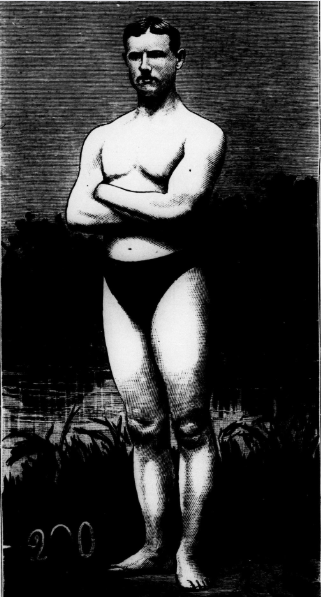
Duncan C Ross
