= William Miller (Australian athlete) =

Australian athlete, born 1846

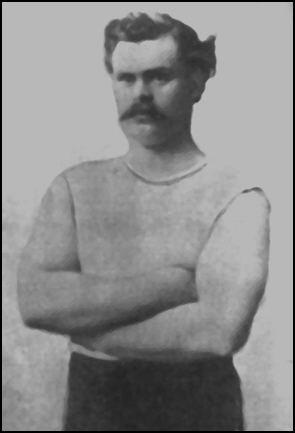
- "Professor" William Miller

Personal information
- Born: 16 December 1846 Cheshire, England
- Died: 11 March 1939 (aged 92) Baltimore, Maryland, United States

Professional wrestling career
- Ring name: William Miller
- Billed height: 5 ft 10 in (178 cm)
- Billed weight: 191–196 lb (87–89 kg)
- Debut: 1871
- Retired: 1890

William Miller (16 December 1846 – 11 March 1939), also known as Professor William Miller, was an Australian athlete, the only athlete to hold Australian championships for boxing, fencing, wrestling and weight-lifting.

Miller was born in Liscard, Cheshire, England, the son of Alexander Miller, a wine and spirits merchant, and his wife Sarah Anne, née Hatton (W. Miller was partly of French heritage). At age 5, William Miller arrived in Victoria, Australia with his family. From 1862 to 1869, Miller worked for the Melbourne and Hobson's Bay Railway Company as station-master and telegraph instructor.

Miller became proprietor of the Melbourne Gymnasium, and instructor to some the leading Melbourne schools. Miller won the Australian broadsword championship in 1872. In the US from 1874 to 1880 he defeated cosmopolitan champions in boxing and wrestling, out of 72 matches, he had 55 wins and 11 draws. In 1879 he defeated Duncan Ross walking over 102 miles (164 km) in 24 hours and drew with the champion weight-lifter Richard Pennell, both lifting 1550 lbs. (703 kg) of iron.

== Australian heavyweight champion, 1883 ==
He met Larry Foley, who came out of boxing retirement to fight a gloved battle using the newer and somewhat safer Marquess of Queensberry Rules against him in Sydney, New South Wales on 28 May 1883 for the championship of Australia. Due to Miller's weight of around 190, the bout was a heavyweight championship. Unofficially declared a draw, the forty round bout and the £500 purse were given to Miller on 29 May when Foley conceded he had lost the fight. Miller was a considerably larger and more muscular man than Foley, with nearly a forty-pound advantage in weight to Foley's light middleweight class of around 150 pounds. The contest lasted three hours and would have been called far earlier if held today, as Foley took a great deal of punishment. Though Foley had a lead in the first hour, the tide turned and Miller's strong and constant left to Foley's face began to take its toll. In the 37th and 40th rounds, a right by Miller knocked Foley to the mat. Around the 40th round, spectators climbed into the ring, and the police were forced to stop the fight, with the referee postponing the ruling or calling a temporary draw til the following day.

Miller lived in Baltimore from 1917 and died there on 11 March 1939. After his death, The Baltimore Sun described him as 'one of the greatest all-round athletes in the world'.

== Championships and accomplishments ==
- Professional boxing
  - Australian Heavyweight Championship
- Professional wrestling
  - Australian Heavyweight Championship (1 time, inaugural)
  - Australian Graeco-Roman Heavyweight Championship
  - American/World Graeco-Roman Championship
