= Tom Jenkins (wrestler) =

American professional wrestler (1872–1957)

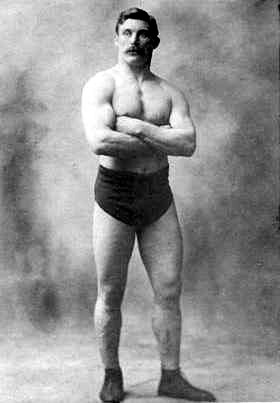

Personal information
- Born: August 3, 1872 Bedford, Ohio, Cuyahoga County, U.S.
- Died: June 19, 1957 (aged 84)

Professional wrestling career
- Ring name: Tom Jenkins
- Billed height: 5 ft 10.5 in (179 cm)
- Billed from: Bedford, Ohio
- Trained by: Luke Lamb
- Debut: 1890s
- Retired: semi-retired 1905, retired 1914

Tom Jenkins (August 3, 1872 – June 19, 1957) was an American professional wrestler who held the American Heavyweight Championship three times around the turn of the 20th century. On May 4, 1905 at Madison Square Garden, he wrestled for the newly created World Catch-as-Catch-Can Championship, but lost to George Hackenschmidt. He later taught at the United States Military Academy at West Point (1905–1942) and from 1912 to 1943, he also taught wrestling and boxing at the New York Military Academy at Cornwall-on-Hudson, New York, one of his pupils being John Thomas Corley.

== Championships and accomplishments ==
=== Professional wrestling ===
- George Tragos/Lou Thesz Professional Wrestling Hall of Fame
  - Class of 2006
- International Professional Wrestling Hall of Fame
  - Class of 2022
- Professional Wrestling Hall of Fame and Museum
  - Pioneer Era (2008)
- Wrestling Observer Newsletter Hall of Fame
  - Class of 1996
- Other championships
  - American Heavyweight Championship (3 times)

== See also ==
- American Heavyweight Championship
- Frank Gotch
- Farmer Burns
