= Ernest Roeber =

German-American professional wrestler

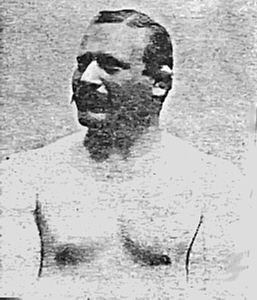
- Roeber, c. 1890

Personal information
- Born: September 1861 Hanover, Kingdom of Hanover
- Died: April 30, 1944 (aged 82)

Professional wrestling career
- Ring name(s): Ernest Roeber; Ernst Roeber
- Billed height: 5 ft 7 in (170 cm)
- Billed weight: 186 lb (84 kg)

Ernest Roeber (September 1861 – April 30, 1944) was a German-American professional wrestler who held the European Greco-Roman Heavyweight Championship from 1894 to 1900 and from 1900 to 1901. Roeber also held the American Greco-Roman Heavyweight Championship and the German World Heavyweight Championship.

== Championships and accomplishments ==
- Greco-Roman wrestling
  - European Greco-Roman Heavyweight Championship (2 times)
  - American Greco-Roman Heavyweight Championship (2 times)
- Professional wrestling
  - German World Heavyweight Championship (1 time)

== Sources ==
- Sprechman, Jordan and Bill Shannon. This Day in New York Sports. Champaigne, Illinois: Sports Publishing LLC, 1998. ISBN 1-57167-254-0
