= Tom Cannon (wrestler) =

British wrestler (1852–??)

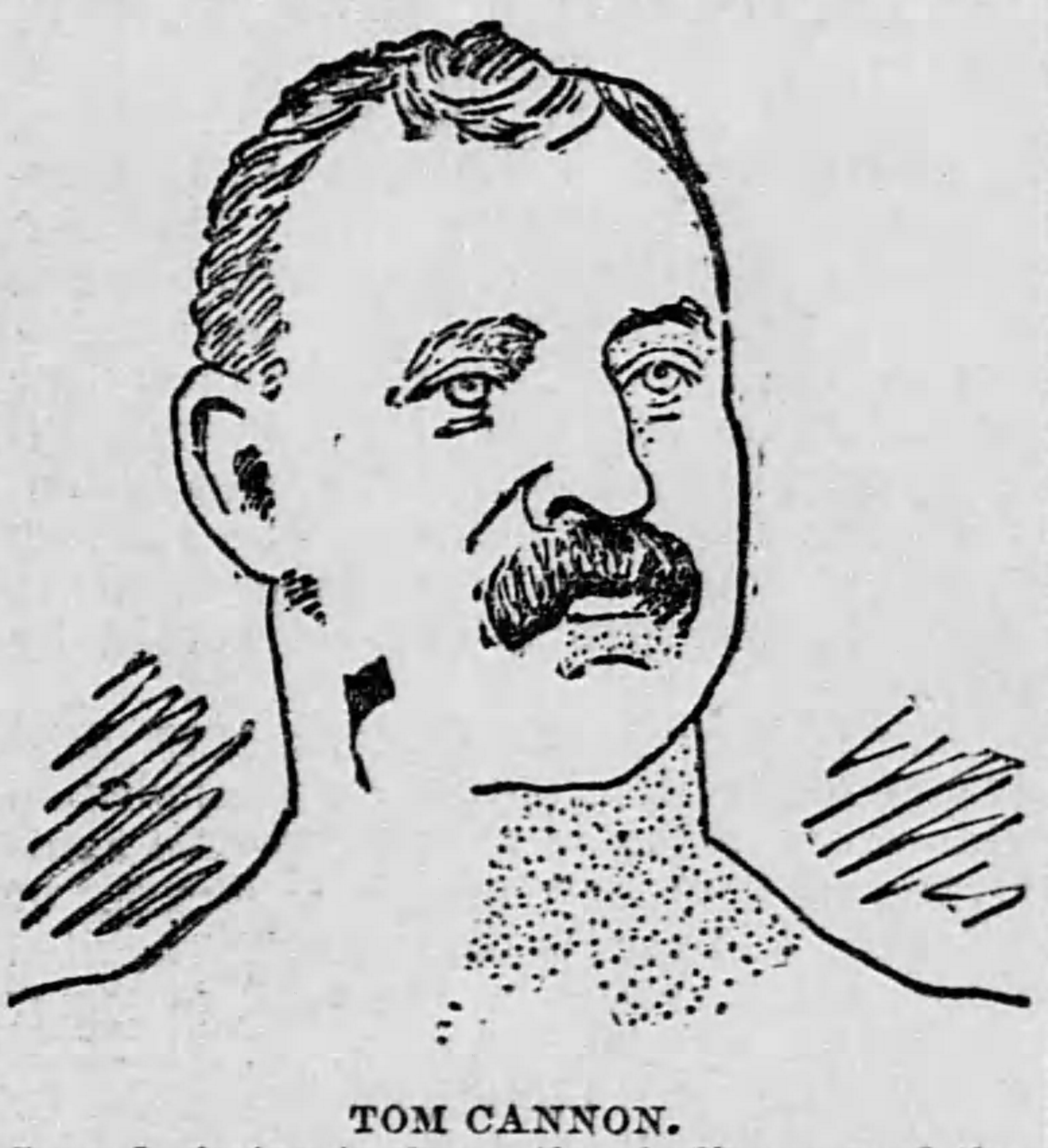
- Tom Cannon 1885

Personal information
- Born: Tom Cannon; 19 April 1852 Tyldesley, Lancashire, England, United Kingdom
- Died: deceased

Professional wrestling career
- Billed from: Tyldesley, Greater Manchester, England, United Kingdom

Tom Cannon was the ring name for a British professional wrestler and World Heavyweight Champion who was active in the late 19th century and early portion of the 20th century, but whose actual name is lost to history.

He competed in Cornish, Cumberland, Greco-Roman, Lancashire catch wrestling, and mixed style matches in the UK, the US and Australia, in the late 19th and early 20th centuries, including winning a tournament, beating 22 other competitors.

One of his recorded losses came in 1892 when he visited British India, where he was defeated by 21 year-old Indian pehlwani wrestler Kareem Buksh.

== Championships and accomplishments ==
- Independent
  - European Greco-Roman Heavyweight Championship
  - World Greco-Roman Heavyweight Championship
  - World Mixed Style Heavyweight Championship
- International Professional Wrestling Hall of Fame
  - Class of 2022
