= List of professional wrestling attendance records in the United States =

List of the largest attendances in the history of American professional wrestling

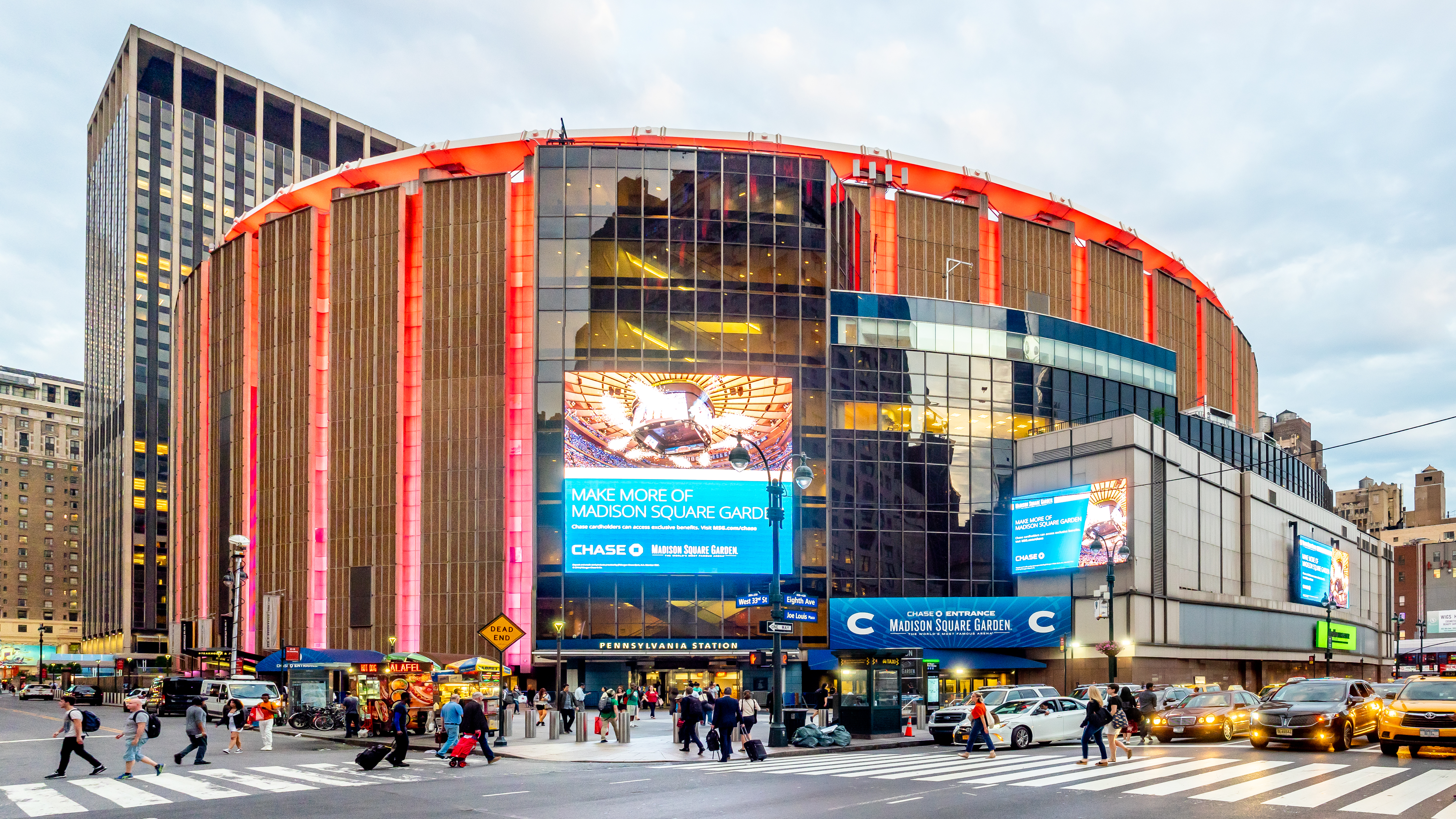
Madison Square Garden, long considered WWE's home arena, holds a number of pro wrestling attendance records.

The following is a list of professional wrestling attendance records in the United States. The list is dominated by the American professional wrestling promotion World Wrestling Entertainment which has controlled the industry in North America since 2002. As the World Wrestling Federation, it became the first national promotion in the U.S. during the 1980s wrestling boom. The National Wrestling Alliance and World Championship Wrestling were both main competitors to the WWF during the 1980s and 1990s, however, all of their events were surpassed by the WWE by the early 2000s.

According to this list, 17 events are from WWE's flagship WrestleMania pay-per-view (PPV) event, which since 2007's WrestleMania 23 has been held exclusively in stadiums that typically have a seating capacity of at least 70,000 people or more. Only three of the attendances listed are non-WWE events, with two WCW Monday Nitro episodes being the only house show events on the list. There are only two attendance records remaining from the "Territory-era" (1940s-1980s) and one from the "Pioneer-era" (1900s-1940s). All but eleven of the events have been held in the Southern United States, while three have been held on the East Coast (Massachusetts and New Jersey), four in the Midwest (Indiana, Michigan and Ohio), two in the Southwest (Arizona) and two on the West Coast of the United States (California and Washington).

== Events and attendances ==
Promotion	Event	Location	Venue	Attendance	Main Event(s)
WWE	WrestleMania 32; April 3, 2016	Arlington, Texas	AT&T Stadium^{†}	80,709	Triple H (c) vs. Roman Reigns for the WWE World Heavyweight Championship
WWE	WrestleMania XXVIII; April 1, 2012	Miami Gardens, Florida	Sun Life Stadium	78,363	John Cena vs. The Rock
WWF	WrestleMania III; March 29, 1987	Pontiac, Michigan	Pontiac Silverdome	78,000	Hulk Hogan (c) vs. André the Giant for the WWF World Heavyweight Championship
WWE	WrestleMania XXIV; March 30, 2008	Orlando, Florida	Florida Citrus Bowl	74,635	Edge (c) vs. The Undertaker for the World Heavyweight Championship
WWE	WrestleMania 29; April 7, 2013	East Rutherford, New Jersey	MetLife Stadium	74,300	The Rock (c) vs. John Cena for the WWE Championship
WWE	WrestleMania 23; April 1, 2007	Detroit, Michigan	Ford Field	74,287	John Cena (c) vs. Shawn Michaels for the WWE Championship
WWE	WrestleMania XXV; April 5, 2009	Houston, Texas	Reliant Stadium^{†}	72,744	Triple H (c) vs. Randy Orton for the WWE Championship
WWE	WrestleMania XXVI; March 28, 2010	Glendale, Arizona	University of Phoenix Stadium^{†}	72,219	The Undertaker vs. Shawn Michaels in a No Disqualification Streak vs. Career match
WWE	WrestleMania XXVII; April 3, 2011	Atlanta, Georgia	Georgia Dome	71,617	The Miz (c) vs. John Cena for the WWE Championship
WWE	WrestleMania X-Seven; April 1, 2001	Houston, Texas	Reliant Astrodome	67,925	The Rock (c) vs. Stone Cold Steve Austin in a No Disqualification match for the WWF Championship
WWE	WrestleMania 35; April 7, 2019	East Rutherford, New Jersey	MetLife Stadium	68,000–70,000	Ronda Rousey (c - Raw) vs. Charlotte Flair (c - SD) vs. Becky Lynch in a winner takes all triple threat match for the WWE Raw Women's Championship and the WWE SmackDown Women's Championship
WWE	WrestleMania 31; March 29, 2015	Santa Clara, California	Levi's Stadium	67,000	Brock Lesnar (c) vs. Roman Reigns vs. Seth Rollins for the WWE World Heavyweight Championship
WWE	WrestleMania 33; April 2, 2017	Orlando, Florida	Camping World Stadium	64,900	Roman Reigns vs. The Undertaker in a No Holds Barred match
WWE	WrestleMania 34; April 8, 2018	New Orleans, Louisiana	Mercedes-Benz Superdome	60,000–65,00	Brock Lesnar (c) vs. Roman Reigns for the WWE Universal Championship
WWE	WrestleMania XXX; April 6, 2014	New Orleans, Louisiana	Mercedes-Benz Superdome	60,000-65,000	Randy Orton (c) vs. Batista vs. Daniel Bryan for the WWE World Heavyweight Championship
WWF	WrestleMania VIII; April 5, 1992	Indianapolis, Indiana	Hoosier Dome	62,167	Hulk Hogan vs. Sid Justice
WWF	Royal Rumble; January 19, 1997	San Antonio, Texas	Alamodome	60,447	Sycho Sid (c) vs. Shawn Michaels for the WWF Championship
WWE	WrestleMania XIX; March 30, 2003	Seattle, Washington	Safeco Field^{†}	54,097	Kurt Angle (c) vs. Brock Lesnar for the WWE Championship
WWE	Royal Rumble; January 29, 2017	San Antonio, Texas	Alamodome	52,050	30-man Royal Rumble match
WWF	WWF at the Ohio State Fair; August 13, 1985	Columbus, Ohio	Ohio State Fairgrounds	50,000	Hulk Hogan (c) vs. Big John Studd for the WWF World Heavyweight Championship
WWE	WWE Tribute to the Troops; December 11, 2010	Fort Hood, Texas	Fort Hood	50,000	John Cena, Rey Mysterio, and Randy Orton vs. Alberto Del Rio, Wade Barrett, and The Miz
WWE	Royal Rumble; January 27, 2019	Phoenix, Arizona	Chase Field †	48,193	30-man Royal Rumble match
WCW	WCW Monday Nitro (Ep. 147); July 6, 1998	Atlanta, Georgia	Georgia Dome	41,412	Hollywood Hogan (c) vs. Bill Goldberg for the WCW World Heavyweight Championship
AWA	Ed Don George vs. Danno O'Mahoney; July 30, 1935	Boston, Massachusetts	Braves Field	40,000	Ed Don George (AWA) vs. Danno O'Mahoney (WC) in a unification match for the AWA World Heavyweight Championship and World Heavyweight Wrestling Championship
WCW	WCW Monday Nitro (Ep. 173); January 4, 1999	Atlanta, Georgia	Georgia Dome	38,809	Hollywood Hogan vs. Kevin Nash (c) for the WCW World Heavyweight Championship

== Historical ==
Top 10 most-attended shows prior to the 1900s
No.	Promoter	Event	Location	Venue	Attendance	Main Event(s)
1.	—	Ernest Roeber vs. Yussuf the Terrible Turk; March 26, 1898	New York City, New York	Madison Square Garden	10,000	Ernest Roeber vs. Yussuf the Terrible Turk
2.	—	Ernest Roeber vs. Tom Jenkins; July 4, 1899	Cleveland, Ohio	League Park	7,000	Ernest Roeber vs. Tom Jenkins
3.	—	Evan "Strangler" Lewis vs. Yussuf the Terrible Turk; June 20, 1898	Chicago, Illinois	Tattersall's	6,000+ (Note: The exact attendance figure is unknown. There are different reports on the attendance of the event with numbers ranging from 6,000 to 10,000.)	Evan "Strangler" Lewis vs. Yussuf the Terrible Turk in a Best 2-out-of-3 Falls match for the World Catch-as-Catch-Can Championship
4.	—	James H. McLaughlin vs. James Owens; December 27, 1876	Boston, Massachusetts	Music Hall	4,000	James H. McLaughlin (c) vs. James Owens for the American Collar & Elbow Championship
4.	—	William Muldoon vs. Theobaud Bauer; January 19, 1880	New York City, New York	Madison Square Garden	4,000	William Muldoon vs. Theobaud Bauer in a Best 2-out-of-3 Falls match
4.	—	Ernest Roeber vs. Yussuf the Terrible Turk; April 30, 1898	New York City, New York	Metropolitan Riding Academy	4,000	Ernest Roeber vs. Yussuf the Terrible Turk
5.	—	William Miller vs. Andre Christol; November 9, 1875	New York City, New York	Grand Opera House	3,000	William Miller vs. Andre Christol
5.	—	Dennis Gallagher vs. Hugh Leonard; April 21, 1890	Buffalo, New York	Music Hall	3,000	Dennis Gallagher vs. Hugh Leonard in a Best 2-out-of-3 Falls match
5.	—	Farmer Burns vs. Tom Jenkins; January 25, 1898	Cleveland, Ohio	Star Theater	3,000	Farmer Burns vs. Tom Jenkins in a Best 3-out-of-5 Falls match
6.	—	John McMahon vs. Prof. William Miller; May 12, 1879	New York City, New York	Gilmore's Garden	2,000	John McMahon vs. Prof. William Miller in a Catch-as-Catch-Can match
6.	—	William Muldoon vs. Prof. William Miller; March 23, 1880	New York City, New York	Madison Square Garden	2,000	William Muldoon vs. Prof. William Miller
6.	—	William Muldoon vs. Clarence Whistler; January 26, 1881	New York City, New York	Terrace Garden Theater	2,000	William Muldoon vs. Clarence Whistler in a Graeco-Roman match
7.	—	William Muldoon vs. Carl Abs; May 18, 1885	New York City, New York	Irving Hall	1,600	William Muldoon vs. Carl Abs for the World Graeco-Roman Heavyweight Championship
8.	—	Farmer Burns vs. Dan McLeod; October 26, 1897	Indianapolis, Indiana	Grand Opera House	1,500	Farmer Burns (c) vs. Dan McLeod for the American Mixed-Style Heavyweight Championship
9.	—	Prof. William Miller vs. Theobald Bauer; February 27, 1880	Philadelphia, Pennsylvania	Horticultural Hall	1,100	Prof. William Miller vs. Theobald Bauer in a Best 2-out-of-3 Falls match
10.	—	Prof. William Miller vs. Andre Christol; June 15, 1877	New York City, New York	Terrace Garden Theater	1,000	Prof. William Miller vs. Andre Christol
10.	—	Jimmy Faulkner vs. Hugh Leonard; February 21, 1890	Buffalo, New York	Music Hall	1,000	Jimmy Faulkner vs. Hugh Leonard in a Best 2-out-of-3 Falls match
10.	—	Farmer Burns vs. W.L. Malone; December 29, 1896	Chicago, Illinois	Madison Street Natorium	1,000	Farmer Burns vs. W.L. Malone in a Best 3-out-of-5 Falls match

Top 10 most-attended shows in the 1900s
No.	Promoter	Event	Location	Venue	Attendance	Main Event(s)
1.	—	Bech Olsen vs. Ernest Roeber; March 21, 1900	New York City, New York	Madison Square Garden	12,000	Ernest Roeber (c-AC) vs. Bech Olsen (c-WC) in a Best 2-out-of-3 Falls match in a Champion vs. Champion match for the American Graeco-Roman Heavyweight Championship and the World Graeco-Roman Heavyweight Championship
2.	—	Frank Gotch vs. Raoul de Rouen; March 25, 1909	Kansas City, Missouri	Convention Hall	11,000	Frank Gotch (c) vs. Raoul de Rouen in a Best 2-out-of-3 Falls match for the World Heavyweight Wrestling Championship
3.	—	Frank Gotch vs. Yussiff Mahmout; April 14, 1909	Chicago, Illinois	Dexter Park Pavilion	10,000	Frank Gotch (c) vs. Yussiff Mahmout in a Best 2-out-of-3 Falls match for the World Heavyweight Wrestling Championship
3.	—	Frank Gotch vs. Giovanni Raicevich; November 9, 1909	Chicago, Illinois	Chicago Coliseum	10,000	Frank Gotch (c) vs. Giovanni Raicevich in a Best 2-out-of-3 Falls match for the World Heavyweight Wrestling Championship
4.	—	Tom Jenkins vs. Ernest Roeber; April 8, 1901	East St. Louis, Missouri	Exhibition Coliseum	8,000	Tom Jenkins vs. Ernest Roeber in a "mixed styles" Best 2-out-of-3 Falls match
4.	—	Rudy Santell vs. Harry Lescher; August 31, 1904	Trenton, New Jersey	Mercer Pleasure Park	8,000	Rudy Santell vs. Harry Lescher
4.	—	Fred Beell vs. Frank Gotch; December 17, 1906	Kansas City, Missouri	Convention Hall	8,000	Fred Beell (c) vs. Frank Gotch in a Best 2-out-of-3 Falls match for the American Heavyweight Championship
4.	W.W. Wittig	George Hackenschmidt vs. Frank Gotch; April 3, 1908	Chicago, Illinois	Dexter Park Pavilion	8,000	George Hackenschmidt (c) vs. Frank Gotch for the American Mixed-Style (Freestyle) Heavyweight Championship
5.	—	Raoul de Rouen vs. Yussiff Mahmout; January 19, 1909	Kansas City, Missouri	Convention Hall	7,000	Raoul de Rouen vs. Yussiff Mahmout in a Handicap match
6.	—	George Bothner vs. Katsuguma Higashi; April 6, 1905	New York City, New York	Grand Central Palace	6,000	George Bothner vs. Katsuguma Higashi in a Wrestler vs. Jujutsuka match
6.	—	Tom Jenkins vs. Frank Gotch; May 23, 1906	Kansas City, Missouri	Convention Hall	6,000	Tom Jenkins (c) vs. Frank Gotch in a Best 2-out-of-3 Falls match for the American Heavyweight Championship
7.	—	Frank Gotch vs. Dr. B. F. Roller; April 27, 1909	Kansas City, Missouri	Convention Hall	5,500	Frank Gotch (c) vs. Dr. B. F. Roller in a Best 2-out-of-3 Falls match for the World Heavyweight Championship
8.	—	Ernest Roeber vs. Paul Pons; February 6, 1901	New York City, New York	Madison Square Garden	5,000	Ernest Roeber vs. Paul Pons
8.	—	Tom Jenkins vs. Dan McLeod; November 7, 1901	Cleveland, Ohio	Central Armory	5,000	Tom Jenkins vs. Dan McLeod for the American Heavyweight Championship
8.	—	John Piening vs. Harald Egeberg; January 18, 1905	New York City, New York	Grand Central Palace	5,000	John Piening vs. Harald Egeberg
8.	—	John Rooney vs. Tom Sharkey; April 26, 1906	Chicago, Illinois	Chicago Coliseum	5,000	John Rooney vs. Tom Sharkey in a Handicap match
8.	—	Frank Gotch vs. John Rooney; March 14, 1907	Chicago, Illinois	Chicago Coliseum	5,000	Frank Gotch (c) vs. John Rooney in a Best 2 out of 3 Falls match for the American Heavyweight Championship
8.	—	Frank Gotch vs. Jess Reimer; May 3, 1909	Des Moines, Iowa	Des Moines Auditorium	5,000	Frank Gotch (c) vs. Jess Reimer in a Best 2-out-of-3 Falls match for the World Heavyweight Championship with special referee Dr. B. F. Roller
9.	—	Stanislaus Zbyszko vs. Leo Pardello; November 29, 1909	Chicago, Illinois	Riverside Rink	4,500	Stanislaus Zbyszko vs. Leo Pardello in a Best 2-out-of-3 Falls match
10.	—	Stanislaus Zbyszko vs. Tom Winkelhoefer, John Eberly and Leon Dumont; November 19, 1909	Chicago, Illinois	Dexter Park Pavilion	4,100	Stanislaus Zbyszko vs. Tom Winkelhoefer, John Eberly and Leon Dumont in a 3 on 1 Handicap match

Top 10 most-attended shows in the 1910s
No.	Promoter	Event	Location	Venue	Attendance	Main Event(s)
1.	—	Frank Gotch vs. George Hackenschmidt; September 4, 1911	Chicago, Illinois	Comiskey Park	30,000	Frank Gotch (c) vs. George Hackenschmidt in a Best 2 out of 3 Falls match for the World Heavyweight Championship
2.	—	Ed Lewis vs. Joe Stecher; July 4, 1916	Omaha, Nebraska	Gene Melady Stadium	18,000	Ed "Strangler" Lewis vs. Joe Stecher
3.	—	Frank Gotch vs. Georg Lurich; April 1, 1913	Kansas City, Missouri	Convention Hall	14,000	Frank Gotch (c) vs. Georg Lurich in a Best 2-out-of-3 Falls match for the World Heavyweight Wrestling Championship
4.	—	Ad Santel vs. Joe Stecher; February 22, 1917	San Francisco, California	Civic Auditorium	12,000	Ad Santel (PC) vs. Joe Stecher (WC) in a Champion vs. Champion Best 2-out-of-3 Falls match for the Pacific Coast Heavyweight Championship and World Heavyweight Wrestling Championship
5.	—	Frank Gotch vs. Stanislaus Zbyszko; June 1, 1910	Chicago, Illinois	Chicago Coliseum	10,000	Frank Gotch (c) vs. Stanislaus Zbyszko in a Best 2-out-of-3 Falls match for the World Heavyweight Championship
5.	—	Frank Gotch vs. Leo Pardello; May 1, 1917	Chicago, Illinois	Chicago Coliseum	10,000	Frank Gotch vs. Leo Pardello
5.	—	Wladek Zbyszko vs. John Olin; January 29, 1918	New York City, New York	Madison Square Garden	10,000	Wladek Zbyszko (c) vs. John Olin for the American Heavyweight Championship
5.	Jack Curley	Joe Stecher vs. Wladek Zbyszko; December 8, 1919	New York City, New York	71st Regiment Armory	10,000	Joe Stecher (c) vs. Wladek Zbyszko for the World Heavyweight Wrestling Championship
6.	—	Stanislaus Zbyszko vs. Yussiff Mahmout; February 14, 1910	Chicago, Illinois	Chicago Coliseum	8,000	Stanislaus Zbyszko vs. Yussiff Mahmout
6.	—	Joe Stecher vs. Charley Peters; February 9, 1917	Omaha, Nebraska	Civic Auditorium	8,000	Joe Stecher vs. Charley Peters
7.	—	Ed Lewis vs. Ad Santel; December 12, 1916	San Francisco, California	Civic Auditorium	7,500	Ed "Strangler" Lewis vs. Ad Santel
8.	—	John Olin vs. Ed Lewis; May 2, 1917	Chicago, Illinois	Chicago Coliseum	7,000	John Olin (c) vs. Ed "Strangler" Lewis for the World Heavyweight Championship
9.	—	Stanislaus Zbyszko vs. Constant Le Marin; April 23, 1913	Chicago, Illinois	Chicago Coliseum	6,500	Stanislaus Zbyszko vs. Constant Le Marin in a Best 2-out-of-3 Falls match
10.	—	Chris Jordan vs. Mike Yokel; October 27, 1913	Salt Lake City, Utah	Auditorium	6,000	Chris Jordan (c) vs. Mike Yokel in a Best 2-out-of-3 Falls match for the World Middleweight Championship
10.	Samuel Rachmann	International Graeco-Roman Wrestling Tournament (Day 1); May 19, 1915	New York City, New York	Manhattan Opera House	6,000	50-man tournament
10.	—	Wladek Zbyszko vs. Ed "Strangler" Lewis; April 28, 1919	Chicago, Illinois	Chicago Coliseum	6,000	Wladek Zbyszko vs. Ed "Strangler" Lewis

Top 10 most-attended shows in the 1920s
No.	Promoter	Event	Location	Venue	Attendance	Main Event(s)
1.	Aurelio Fabiani	Dick Shikat vs. Jim Londos; August 23, 1929	Philadelphia, Pennsylvania	Municipal Stadium	30,000	Dick Shikat vs. Jim Londos for the New York State Athletic Commission World Heavyweight Championship
2.	Paul Bowser	Gus Sonnenberg vs. Ed Lewis; July 9, 1929	Boston, Massachusetts	Fenway Park	25,000	Gus Sonnenberg (c) vs. Ed "Strangler" Lewis in a Best 2-out-of-3 Falls match for the AWA World Heavyweight Championship
3.	Paul Bowser	Ed Lewis vs. Gus Sonnenberg; January 4, 1929	Boston, Massachusetts	Boston Garden	20,000	Ed "Strangler" Lewis (c) vs. Gus Sonnenberg for the AWA World Heavyweight Championship
4.	Paul Bowser	Gus Sonnenberg vs. Joe Malcewicz; March 15, 1929	Boston, Massachusetts	Boston Garden	18,000	Gus Sonnenberg (c) vs. Joe Malcewicz in a Best 2-out-of-3 Falls match for the AWA World Heavyweight Championship
5.	Tom Packs	Stanislaus Zbyszko vs. Joe Stecher; May 30, 1925	St. Louis, Missouri	University Stadium	13,500	Stanislaus Zbyszko (c) vs. Joe Stecher in a Best 2-out-of-3 Falls match for the World Heavyweight Wrestling Championship
6.	William Wellman	Stanislaus Zbyszko vs. Earl Caddock; February 6, 1922	New York City, New York	Madison Square Garden	12,000	Stanislaus Zbyszko (c) vs. Earl Caddock in a Best 2-out-of-3 Falls match for the World Heavyweight Championship
6.	—	Wayne Munn vs. Stanislaus Zbyszko; February 11, 1925	Kansas City, Missouri	Convention Hall	12,000	Wayne Munn (c) vs. Stanislaus Zbyszko in a Best 2-out-of-3 Falls match for the World Heavyweight Championship
6.	Floyd Fltzsimmons	Ed Lewis vs. Wayne Munn; May 30, 1925	Michigan City, Indiana	Sky Blue Arena	12,000	Ed "Strangler" Lewis vs. Wayne Munn in a Best 2-out-of-3 Falls match
6.	Tom Packs	Joe Stecher vs. Jim Londos; February 10, 1926	St. Louis, Missouri	St. Louis Coliseum	12,000	Joe Stecher (c) vs. Jim Londos in a Best 2-out-of-3 Falls match for the World Heavyweight Championship
6.	Ray Fabiani	Joe Stecher vs. George Calza; August 2, 1927	Philadelphia, Pennsylvania	Baker Bowl	12,000	Joe Stecher (c) vs. George Calza for the World Heavyweight Championship
6.	Paul Bowser	Ed Lewis vs. Gus Sonnenberg; June 29, 1928	Boston, Massachusetts	Boston Arena	12,000	Ed "Strangler" Lewis (c) vs. Gus Sonnenberg for the World Heavyweight Championship
7.	Jack Curley	Ed Lewis vs. Earl Caddock; March 15, 1920	New York City, New York	Madison Square Garden	11,000	Ed "Strangler" Lewis vs. Earl Caddock
7.	Lou Daro	Gus Sonnenberg vs. Ed Lewis; October 23, 1929	Los Angeles, California	Grand Olympic Auditorium	11,000	Gus Sonnenberg (c) vs. Ed "Strangler" Lewis in a Best 2-out-of-3 Falls match for the AWA World Heavyweight Championship
7.	Lou Daro	Gus Sonnenberg vs. Ed Lewis; November 13, 1929	Los Angeles, California	Grand Olympic Auditorium	11,000	Gus Sonnenberg (c) vs. Ed "Strangler" Lewis in a Best 2-out-of-3 Falls match for the AWA World Heavyweight Championship
8.	Lou Daro	Gus Sonnenberg vs. Joe Malcewicz; July 24, 1929	Los Angeles, California	Grand Olympic Auditorium	10,700	Gus Sonnenberg (c) vs. Joe Malcewicz in a Best 2-out-of-3 Falls match for the AWA World Heavyweight Championship
9.	—	Ed Lewis vs. Wayne Munn; January 3, 1927	Chicago, Illinois		10,500	Ed "Strangler" Lewis vs. Wayne Munn in a Best 2-out-of-3 Falls match
10.	Lou Daro	Gus Sonnenberg vs. Joe Stecher; April 7, 1926	Los Angeles, California	Grand Olympic Auditorium	10,400	Joe Stecher (c) vs. George Kotsonaros for the World Heavyweight Championship
10.	Lou Daro	Gus Sonnenberg vs. Joe Stecher; September 18, 1929	Los Angeles, California	Grand Olympic Auditorium	10,400	Gus Sonnenberg (c) vs. Joe Stecher in a Best 2-out-of-3 Falls match for the AWA World Heavyweight Championship

Top 10 most-attended shows in the 1930s
No.	Promoter	Event	Location	Venue	Attendance	Main Event(s)
1.	Paul Bowser	Ed Don George vs. Danno O'Mahoney; July 30, 1935	Boston, Massachusetts	Braves Field	40,000	Ed Don George (AWA) vs. Danno O'Mahoney (WC) in a unification match for the AWA World Heavyweight Championship and World Heavyweight Wrestling Championship
2.	Lou Daro	Jim Londos vs. Man Mountain Dean; October 10, 1934	Los Angeles, California	Grand Olympic Auditorium	38,756	Jim Londos (c) vs. Man Mountain Dean in a Best 2-out-of-3 Falls match for the World Heavyweight Championship (Los Angeles-Version)
3.	Ed White	Jim Londos vs. Ed Lewis; September 20, 1934	Chicago, Illinois	Wrigley Field	35,265	Jim Londos (c) vs. Ed "Strangler" Lewis for the World Heavyweight Championship
4.	Paul Bowser	Henri Deglane vs. Gus Sonnenberg; July 30, 1931	Boston, Massachusetts	Braves Field	30,000	Henri Deglane (c) vs. Gus Sonnenberg in a Best 2-out-of-3 Falls match for the AWA World Heavyweight Championship
4.	Paul Bowser	Ed Don George vs. Danno O'Mahoney; July 18, 1934	Boston, Massachusetts	Fenway Park	30,000	Ed Don George (AWA) vs. Danno O'Mahoney (WC) in a unification match for the AWA World Heavyweight Championship and World Heavyweight Wrestling Championship
4.	Paul Bowser	Jim Londos vs. Danno O'Mahoney; June 27, 1935	Boston, Massachusetts	Fenway Park	30,000	Jim Londos vs. Danno O'Mahoney for the World Heavyweight Wrestling Championship
5.	Jack Curley	Ed Lewis vs. Dick Shikat; June 9, 1932	New York City, New York	Madison Square Garden Bowl	25,000	Ed "Strangler" Lewis vs. Dick Shikat
5.	Jack Curley	Jim Browning vs. Jim Londos; June 25, 1934	New York City, New York	Madison Square Garden Bowl	25,000	Jim Browning (c) vs. Jim Londos for the NYSAC World Heavyweight Championship
6.	Jack Curley	Jim Londos vs. Jim McMillen; January 26, 1931	New York City, New York	Madison Square Garden	22,200	Jim Londos (c) vs. Jim McMillen for the NYSAC World Heavyweight Championship
7.	Paul Bowser	Jim Browning vs. Stanley Sitkowski; June 29, 1932	Boston, Massachusetts	Braves Field	22,197	Jim Browning vs. Stanley Sitkowski
8.	Jack Curley	Jim Londos vs. Ferenc Holuban; December 29, 1930	New York City, New York	Madison Square Garden	22,000	Jim Londos (c) vs. Ferenc Holuban for the NYSAC World Heavyweight Championship
8.	Paul Bowser	Henri Deglane vs. Gus Sonnenberg; January 13, 1933	Boston, Massachusetts	Boston Garden	22,000	Henri Deglane (c) vs. Gus Sonnenberg for the AWA World Heavyweight Championship
9.	Jack Curley	Jim Londos vs. Ray Steele; June 29, 1931	New York City, New York	Yankee Stadium	21,000	Jim Londos (c) vs. Ray Steele for the NYSAC World Heavyweight Championship
9.	—	Jim McMillen vs. Ruffy Silverstein; November 16, 1937	Chicago, Illinois	Chicago Stadium	21,000	Jim McMillen (c) vs. Ruffy Silverstein for the Illinois Heavyweight Championship
10.	—	Jim Londos vs. Joe Savoldi; January 31, 1934	Chicago, Illinois	Chicago Stadium	20,200	Jim Londos (c) vs. Joe Savoldi for the NWA World Heavyweight Championship

Top 10 most-attended shows in the 1940s
No.	Promotion	Event	Location	Venue	Attendance	Main Event(s)
1.	MBA	Antonino Rocca vs. Gene Stanlee; December 12, 1949	New York City, New York	Madison Square Garden	17,854	Antonino Rocca vs. Gene Stanlee
2.	TPSE	Bill Longson vs. Buddy Rogers; April 12, 1946	St. Louis, Missouri	Kiel Auditorium	17,621	Bill Longson (c) vs. Buddy Rogers for the NWA World Heavyweight Championship
3.	TPSE	Bill Longson vs. Lou Thesz; January 23, 1947	St. Louis, Missouri	St. Louis Arena	15,180	Bill Longson (c) vs. Lou Thesz for the NWA World Heavyweight Championship
4.	GLAC	Maurice Tillet vs. Wladyslaw Talun; May 25, 1942	Buffalo, New York	Buffalo Memorial Auditorium	14,220	Maurice Tillet vs. Wladyslaw Talun
5.	TPSE	Bill Longson vs. Wladyslaw Talun; January 26, 1945	St. Louis, Missouri	Kiel Auditorium	13,879	Bill Longson vs. Wladyslaw Talun
6.	TPSE	Bill Longson vs. Wladyslaw Talun; February 23, 1945	St. Louis, Missouri	Kiel Auditorium	13,807	Bill Longson (c) vs. Wladyslaw Talun for the NWA World Heavyweight Championship
7.	TPSE	Bill Longson vs. Whipper Billy Watson; May 5, 1944	St. Louis, Missouri	Kiel Auditorium	13,471	Bill Longson (c) vs. Whipper Billy Watson for the NWA World Heavyweight Championship
8.	GLAC	Maurice Tillet vs. Joe Cox; January 23, 1942	Buffalo, New York	Buffalo Memorial Auditorium	13,046	Maurice Tillet (c) vs. Joe Cox for the AWA World Heavyweight Championship
9.	TPSE	Bill Longson vs. Ed Lewis; April 8, 1942	St. Louis, Missouri	Kiel Auditorium	12,986	Bill Longson (c) vs. Ed "Strangler" Lewis for the NWA World Heavyweight Championship
10.	TPSE	Bill Longson vs. Sandor Szabo; February 25, 1944	St. Louis, Missouri	Kiel Auditorium	12,886	Bill Longson (c) vs. Sandor Szabo for the NWA World Heavyweight Championship

Top 10 most-attended shows in the 1950s
No.	Promotion	Event	Location	Venue	Attendance	Main Event(s)
1.	JDE	Lou Thesz vs. Baron Michele Leone; May 21, 1952	Los Angeles, California	Gilmore Baseball Park	25,256	Lou Thesz (c) vs. Baron Michele Leone in a Best 2-out-of-3 Falls match for the NWA World Heavyweight Championship
2.	JPP	Argentina Rocca vs. Mighty Zuma; November 13, 1959	New York City, New York	Madison Square Garden	21,890	Argentina Rocca vs. Mighty Zuma
3.	KKBO	Antonino Rocca and Miguel Pérez vs. The Golden Grahams; January 26, 1959	New York City, New York	Madison Square Garden	21,240	Antonino Rocca and Miguel Pérez defeated The Golden Grahams (Dr. Jerry Graham and Eddie Graham) in a Best 2-out-of-3 Falls match
4.	CWC	Antonino Rocca and Miguel Pérez vs. Sheik of Araby and Bull Curry; October 20, 1958	New York City, New York	Madison Square Garden	20,793	Antonino Rocca and Miguel Pérez vs. Sheik of Araby and Bull Curry
5.	CWC	Édouard Carpentier vs. Killer Kowalski; November 2, 1957	New York City, New York	Madison Square Garden	20,675	Édouard Carpentier vs. Killer Kowalski
6.	CWC	Antonino Rocca and Miguel Pérez vs. The Golden Grahams; December 1, 1958	New York City, New York	Madison Square Garden	20,350	Antonino Rocca and Miguel Pérez defeated The Golden Grahams (Dr. Jerry Graham and Eddie Graham) in a Best 2-out-of-3 Falls match
7.	CWC	Antonino Rocca & Miguel Pérez vs. The Hamilton Brothers; May 24, 1958	New York City, New York	Madison Square Garden	20,335	Antonino Rocca and Miguel Pérez vs. The Hamilton Brothers (Joe Hamilton and Larry Hamilton)
8.	CWC	Antonino Rocca & Miguel Pérez vs. The Fabulous Kangaroos; August 30, 1958	New York City, New York	Madison Square Garden	20,179	Antonino Rocca and Miguel Pérez vs. The Fabulous Kangaroos (Roy Heffernan and Al Costello) in a Best 2-out-of-3 Falls match
9.	CWC	Antonino Rocca & Miguel Pérez vs. The Fabulous Kangaroos; August 9, 1958	New York City, New York	Madison Square Garden	20,169	Antonino Rocca and Miguel Pérez vs. The Fabulous Kangaroos (Roy Heffernan and Al Costello) in a Best 2-out-of-3 Falls match
10.	MWE	Antonino Rocca & Miguel Pérez vs. Jackie Fargo & Don Stevens; March 30, 1957	New York City, New York	Madison Square Garden	20,125	Antonino Rocca and Miguel Pérez vs. Jackie Fargo and Don Stevens

Top 10 most-attended shows in the 1960s
No.	Promotion	Event	Location	Venue	Attendance	Main Event(s)
1.	FKE / CWC	Pat O'Connor vs. Buddy Rogers; June 30, 1961	Chicago, Illinois	Comiskey Park †	38,000	Pat O'Connor (c) vs. Buddy Rogers in a Best 2-out-of-3 Falls match for the NWA World Heavyweight Championship
2.	FKE	Pat O'Connor vs. Yukon Eric; July 29, 1960	Chicago, Illinois	Comiskey Park †	30,275	Pat O'Connor (c) vs. Yukon Eric in a Best 2-out-of-3 Falls match for the NWA World Heavyweight Championship
3.	FKE	Killer Kowalski vs. Bearcat Wright; September 16, 1960	Chicago, Illinois	Comiskey Park †	26,731	Killer Kowalski vs. Bearcat Wright in a Best 2-out-of-3 Falls match
4.	KKBO	Argentina Rocca vs. Mighty Zuma; January 2, 1960	New York City, New York	Madison Square Garden †	21,950	Argentina Rocca vs. Mighty Zuma
5.	CWC	Buddy Rogers vs. Bobo Brazil; July 17, 1962	Washington, D.C.	D.C. Stadium †	20,959	Buddy Rogers vs. Bobo Brazil in a Best 2-out-of-3 Falls match for the NWA World Heavyweight Championship
6.	CWC	Buddy Rogers & Bob Orton vs. Johnny Valentine & Bearcat Wright; January 22, 1962	New York City, New York	Madison Square Garden	20,777	Buddy Rogers and Bob Orton vs. Johnny Valentine and Bearcat Wright in a Best 2-out-of-3 Falls match
7.	CWC	Buddy Rogers & Bob Orton vs. Johnny Valentine & Vittorio Apollo; May 26, 1961	New York City, New York	Madison Square Garden	20,702	Buddy Rogers and Bob Orton vs. Johnny Valentine and Vittorio Apollo
8.	CWC	Antonino Rocca and Johnny Valentine vs. The Fabulous Kangaroos; February 27, 1961	New York City, New York	Madison Square Garden	20,400	Antonino Rocca and Johnny Valentine vs. The Fabulous Kangaroos (Al Costello and Roy Heffernan)
9.	CWC	Buddy Rogers vs. Antonino Rocca; November 13, 1961	New York City, New York	Madison Square Garden	20,353	Buddy Rogers (c) vs. Antonino Rocca in a Best 2-out-of-3 Falls match for the NWA World Heavyweight Championship
10.	FKE	Buddy Rogers vs. Pat O'Connor; September 1, 1961	Chicago, Illinois	Comiskey Park †	20,015	Buddy Rogers (c) vs. Pat O'Connor in a Best 2-out-of-3 Falls match for the NWA World Heavyweight Championship

Top 10 most-attended shows in the 1970s
No.	Promotion	Event	Location	Venue	Attendance	Main Event(s)
1.	WWWF	Showdown at Shea; June 25, 1976	New York City, New York	Shea Stadium	32,000	Antonio Inoki vs. Muhammad Ali fought in a Boxer vs. Wrestler match
2.	NWA-TS	Superdome Extravaganza; July 22, 1978	New Orleans, Louisiana	Louisiana Superdome †	31,000	Ray Candy vs. Ernie Ladd in a Steel Cage match
3.	BTW	Parade of Champions; June 24, 1972	Irving, Texas	Texas Stadium †	26,339	Dory Funk Jr. (c) vs. Fritz Von Erich for the NWA World Heavyweight Championship
4.	WWWF	Billy Graham vs. Bruno Sammartino; June 27, 1977	New York City, New York	Madison Square Garden	26,090	Superstar Billy Graham (c) vs. Bruno Sammartino for the WWWF World Heavyweight Championship
5.	WWWF	Bob Backlund vs. Ivan Koloff; August 28, 1978	New York City, New York	Madison Square Garden	26,000	Bob Backlund (c) vs. Ivan Koloff for the WWWF World Heavyweight Championship
6.	NWA-HW	Fred Blassie vs. John Tolos; August 27, 1971	Los Angeles, California	Los Angeles Memorial Coliseum	25,847	Fred Blassie vs. John Tolos in a Best 2-out-of-3 Falls match
7.	WWWF	Superstar Billy Graham vs. Dusty Rhodes; September 26, 1977	New York City, New York	Madison Square Garden	25,102	Superstar Billy Graham (c) vs. Dusty Rhodes for the WWWF World Heavyweight Championship
8.	WWWF	Bruno Sammartino vs. Waldo Von Erich; May 19, 1975	New York City, New York	Madison Square Garden	24,553	Bruno Sammartino (c) vs. Waldo Von Erich for the WWWF World Heavyweight Championship
9.	WWWF	Showdown at Shea; September 30, 1972	Flushing, New York	Shea Stadium	22,508	Pedro Morales (c) vs. Bruno Sammartino for the WWWF World Heavyweight Championship
10.	WWWF	Superstar Billy Graham vs. Bob Backlund; February 20, 1978	New York City, New York	Madison Square Garden	22,092	Superstar Billy Graham (c) vs. Bob Backlund for the WWWF World Heavyweight Championship

Top 10 most-attended shows in the 1980s
No.	Promotion	Event	Location	Venue	Attendance	Main Event(s)
1.	WWF	WrestleMania III; March 29, 1987	Pontiac, Michigan	Pontiac Silverdome	93,173	Hulk Hogan (c) vs. André the Giant for the WWF World Heavyweight Championship
2.	WWF	WWF at the Ohio State Fair; August 13, 1985	Columbus, Ohio	Ohio State Fairgrounds	50,000	Hulk Hogan (c) vs. Big John Studd for the WWF World Heavyweight Championship
3.	WWF	Showdown at Shea; August 9, 1980	New York City, New York	Shea Stadium	36,295	Bruno Sammartino vs. Larry Zbyszko in a Steel Cage match
4.	WCCW	David Von Erich Memorial Parade of Champions; May 6, 1984	Irving, Texas	Texas Stadium †	32,132	Ric Flair (c) vs. Kerry Von Erich for the NWA World Heavyweight Championship
5.	WCCW	Cotton Bowl Extravaganza '85; October 6, 1985	Dallas, Texas	Cotton Bowl †	30,214	Kerry and Kevin Von Erich vs. The Dynamic Duo (Chris Adams and Gino Hernandez) in a Hair vs. Hair match
6.	WWF	WWF at the Michigan State Fair; August 28, 1985	Detroit, Michigan	Michigan State Fairgrounds	30,000	Hulk Hogan (c-WC) vs. Greg "The Hammer" Valentine (c-TTC) in a Champion vs. Champion match for the WWF World Tag Team Championship and WWF World Heavyweight Championship
7.	MSW	Superdome Extravaganza; August 2, 1980	New Orleans, Louisiana	Louisiana Superdome	28,000	Junkyard Dog vs. Michael Hayes in a Steel Cage Dog Collar match
8.	WWF	WWF on MSG Network; July 30, 1983	New York City, New York	Madison Square Garden	27,000	Bob Backlund (c) vs. George "The Animal" Steele for the WWF World Heavyweight Championship
8.	JCP	Great American Bash; July 6, 1985	Charlotte, North Carolina	American Legion Memorial Stadium	27,000	Ric Flair (c) vs. Nikita Koloff for the NWA World Heavyweight Championship with David Crockett as special referee
9.	WWF	WWF on MSG Network; January 23, 1984	New York City, New York	Madison Square Garden	26,292	André the Giant and The Soul Patrol (Rocky Johnson and Tony Atlas) vs. The Wild Samoans (Afa, Sika and Samula)
10.	WCCW	2nd Von Erich Memorial Parade of Champions; May 5, 1985	Irving, Texas	Texas Stadium	26,153	Ric Flair (c) vs. Kevin Von Erich for the NWA World Heavyweight Championship

Top 10 most-attended shows in the 1990s
No.	Promotion	Event	Location	Venue	Attendance	Main Event(s)
1.	WWF	WrestleMania VIII; April 5, 1992	Indianapolis, Indiana	Hoosier Dome	62,167	Hulk Hogan vs. Sid Justice
2.	WWF	Royal Rumble; January 19, 1997	San Antonio, Texas	Alamodome	60,447	Sycho Sid (c) vs. Shawn Michaels for the WWF Championship
3.	WCW	WCW Monday Nitro (Ep. 147); July 6, 1998	Atlanta, Georgia	Georgia Dome	41,412	Hollywood Hogan (c) vs. Bill Goldberg for the WCW World Heavyweight Championship
4.	WCW	WCW Monday Nitro (Ep. 173); January 4, 1999	Atlanta, Georgia	Georgia Dome	38,809	Hollywood Hogan (c) vs. Kevin Nash for the WCW World Heavyweight Championship
5.	WWF	WWF Raw is War (Ep. 333); October 11, 1999	Atlanta, Georgia	Georgia Dome	33,375	Val Venis and The British Bulldog vs. The Rock 'n' Sock Connection (The Rock and Mankind)
6.	WCW	WCW Monday Nitro (Ep. 169); December 7, 1998	Houston, Texas	Reliant Astrodome	32,067	Bill Goldberg (c) vs. Bam Bam Bigelow for the WCW World Heavyweight Championship
7.	WCW	WCW Monday Nitro (Ep. 171); December 21, 1998	St. Louis, Missouri	Trans World Dome	29,000	Bill Goldberg (c) vs. Scott Hall for the WCW World Heavyweight Championship
8.	WCW	WCW Monday Nitro (Ep. 121); January 5, 1998	Atlanta, Georgia	Georgia Dome	26,773	Lex Luger vs. Randy Savage
9.	WCW	WCW Monday Nitro (Ep. 198); July 5, 1999	Atlanta, Georgia	Georgia Dome	25,338	Kevin Nash (c) vs. Sid Vicious for the WCW World Heavyweight Championship
10.	WWF	SummerSlam; August 30, 1993	Auburn Hills, Michigan	The Palace	23,954	Yokozuna (c) vs. Lex Luger for the WWF World Heavyweight Championship

== See also ==
- List of WWE attendance records
