= Jack Curley =

American sports promoter (1876–1937)

Jacques Schuel
- Publicity still of Curley, circa 1910

Personal information
- Born: July 4, 1876 San Francisco, California, U.S.
- Died: July 12, 1937 (aged 61) Great Neck, Long Island, U.S.

Professional wrestling career
- Ring name: Jack Curley
- Debut: 1907

Jack Curley (July 4, 1876 - July 12, 1937), born Jacques Armand Schuel, was a sports promoter of the early 1900s. He managed several high-profile boxing events around the turn-of-the-century and he also established professional wrestling as a viable business in the big city, and he eventually built the New York City office into an industry power while negotiating an agreement between the nation's most powerful regional territories.

== Early life ==
Curley was born in San Francisco on July 4, 1876, after his parents fled France following the Franco-Prussian War. Nevertheless, they soon returned to Europe, and young Jacques spent his childhood near Strassburg and Paris before moving back to San Francisco as a teenager. Following school, he worked as a newspaper copy boy, and he then took a job at a saloon owned by ex-prize fighter George La Blanche. At age 16, he ran away from home and changed his name to Jack Curley while taking a job at the World's Fair in Chicago. He then worked as a reporter for the Chicago Dispatch, but soon lost his job and suffered through hunger while looking for work. Then in September 1893, he was hired by promoter/manager P. J. Carroll to run his local gym; and Curley assisted many of the fighters in their training, most notably including World Welterweight Champion Tommy Ryan. By 1896, Curley had accumulated enough contacts within the industry that he moved to St. Louis and began promoting his own boxing cards. He eventually returned to Chicago a few years later; and in 1901, he became the city's correspondent for The Police News, one of the nation's top fight publications. In the years that followed, he also managed some of the era's premier boxers, including George Gardiner, Jimmy Gardner, Jim Flynn, Georges Carpentier and Jess Willard.

== Professional Wrestling Promoter ==
On April 26, 1907, Curley promoted his first major wrestling bout between Frank Gotch and Fred Beell. The following year, Gotch defeated strongman Georg Hackenschmidt for the World Heavyweight Title, and pro wrestling subsequently exploded as one of the nation's most popular sports. As a result, Curley became the manager for "Doc" Benjamin Roller, one of the era's premier grapplers; and in 1909, he was named the athletic director for the Alaska–Yukon–Pacific Exposition in Seattle, where he emerged victorious in a promotional war against Joe Carroll. After brokering the legendary July 4, 1910, boxing match between Jack Johnson and Jim Jeffries, he then set up a series of wrestling cards in Europe, matching Dr. Roller against India's Great Gama and Poland's Stanislaus Zbyszko. While in Europe, Curley engaged in feverous negotiations with George Hackenschmidt in an effort to coerce the former champion to return to the U.S. for a big-time rematch against Frank Gotch. Billed as "the Match of the Century," the bout was promoted as the biggest wrestling event ever seen up to that point. Unbeknownst to the public, Hackenschmidt had suffered a debilitating leg injury in a sparring match with Dr. Roller just days before the event was scheduled to occur. However, Curley hid the information from the fans; and through a marketing campaign, he drew 35,000 fans to Chicago's Comiskey Park on September 4, 1911 (setting an attendance record that stood for the next 23 years), while Gotch easily dispatched Hackenschmidt in two straight falls to retain the title.

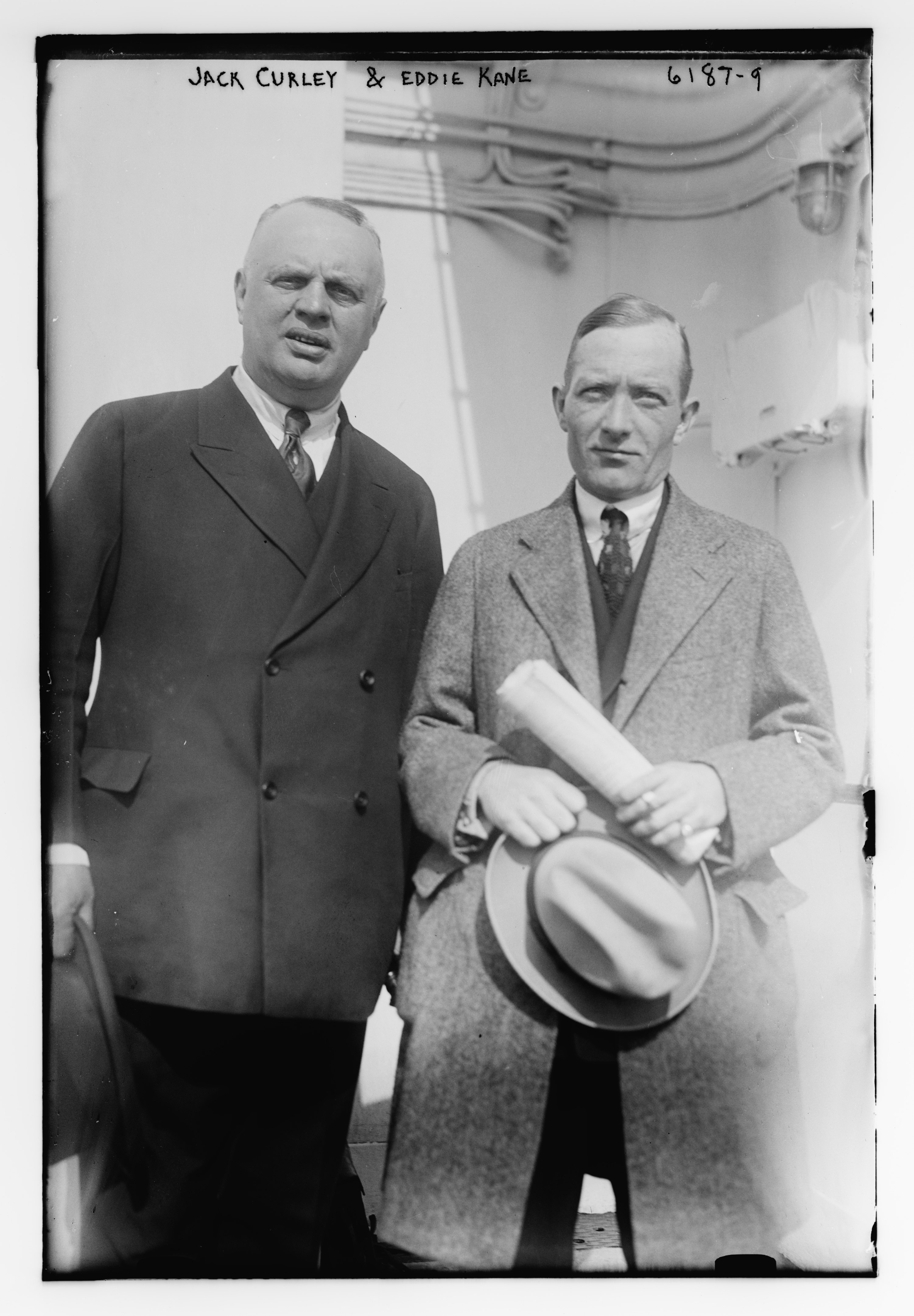
Curley with Eddie Kane

After promoting the Jack Johnson-Jess Willard title bout on April 5, 1915, Curley gradually found himself squeezed out of the boxing industry by Jack Kearns and Tex Rickard; and he thus began to focus most of his energies on pro wrestling. He soon became the manager for Wladek Zbyszko (the younger brother of Stanislaus Zbyszko), and he also guided the likes of "the Terrible Turk" Yussif Hussane and "Americus" Gus Schoenlein. Then on January 27, 1916, he brought new World Champion Joe Stecher to New York City for the first time in a publicized encounter against the Masked Marvel (Mort Henderson); and while pro wrestling had previously floundered in the Big Apple, the bout drew much of New York's social elite while launching Curley as the city's dominant power. As a result, Curley soon established himself as the Northeast's preeminent wrestling matchmaker while promoting the likes of Wladek Zbyszko and his newest ring sensation, "Strangler" Ed Lewis. However, as law enforcement reduced the gambling influence on sporting results, pro wrestling bouts fell into a trend of long, tedious contests that frequently ended in draws or no-decisions. Consequently, Curley revolutionized the industry by placing a greater reliance on one-fall matches in his territory, which subsequently reduced the length of the average matchup and lent to increased fan interest. Then in March 1918, Curley negotiated the formation of a "Trust" with Midwestern promoters Billy Sandow and Tony Stecher that allowed the regions to swap its wrestling talent. Previously, the majority of big matches had been held in rural towns throughout the Midwest, but this agreement proved influential in that it facilitated pro wrestling's relocation to the urban centers of the East Coast, where matchmakers could promote bigger gates in the cities' lucrative sports venues.

== Professional Wrestling's "Trust" Agreement ==
In subsequent years, Curley promoted a series of championship bouts between Joe Stecher, Strangler Lewis, Wladek Zbyszko, and Earl Caddock; but Lewis and Sandow would leave the Trust in 1921, as they soon joined up with Toots Mondt to form "the Gold Dust Trio." Curley's NYC promotion then struggled in the mid-1920s as the Trio drew huge crowds while retaining possession of the title. But on May 30, 1925, Curley joined forces with Stanislaus Zbyszko and Tony Stecher, as Zbyszko double-crossed the Trio by shooting on their manufactured champion, Wayne Munn, thus returning the World Title to Curley's group. Moreover, after the Trio split up following a 1928 financial dispute, Curley then formed an alliance with Toots Mondt and Ray Fabiani, with the New York territory refusing to recognize Lewis' title claim. Curley next built his company around Jim Londos, a new star who became the sport's first major sex symbol during the 1930s. With Londos as the headline attraction, the New York territory regularly drew crowds of 20,000 even in the midst of the Great Depression; but gates quickly plummeted when Londos left the region after a contractual dispute in 1932. Curley then organized a meeting of the nation's top promoters in November 1933, forming a new Trust agreement with Toots Mondt, Ray Fabiani, Tom Packs, Ed White and Paul Bowser that stipulated that they share profits evenly while extending their collective powers across all of the North America. Although it dissolved in 1936, this new Trust expanded wrestling's power base from coast to coast, and it is acknowledged by some as a prelude to the creation of the National Wrestling Alliance in 1948.

== Death ==
While wrestling experienced its share of ups and downs, Curley continued to experiment in other sports; and in 1931, he created the pro tennis tour when he convinced Bill Tilden to give up his amateur status. However, Curley's health gradually declined during the late 1930s, and he died after suffering a heart attack in Great Neck, Long Island on July 12, 1937. A major contributor to The Ring, he was a master of publicity and the foremost leader in establishing New York City as a premier wrestling territory.

== Awards and accomplishments ==
- Wrestling Observer Newsletter

- Wrestling Observer Newsletter Hall of Fame (Class of 2002)
