= Jack Pfefer =

American professional wrestling promoter (1894–1974)

- Publicity still of Pfefer

Personal information
- Born: December 10, 1894 Warsaw, Congress Poland, Russian Empire
- Died: September 13, 1974 (aged 79) Plymouth, Massachusetts, U.S.

Professional wrestling career
- Ring name: Jack Pfefer
- Debut: c. 1924
- Retired: 1967

Jack Pfefer (also commonly spelled as "Pfeffer"; December 10, 1894 – September 13, 1974) was an American professional wrestling promoter during the early-to-mid twentieth century. He pioneered an earlier form of sports entertainment, as he was one of the first promoters to visualize the pro wrestling business in the mold of theater. However, he developed an infamous reputation when he exposed the industry's inner secrets to the mainstream press.

== Early life ==
Jacob Pfefer was born near Warsaw, Vistula Land (modern-day Poland) on December 10, 1894. He grew up under the control of the Russian Empire; and it was during this period when the Czars issued numerous decrees against Jews, resulting in a series of pogroms that killed thousands amidst increased anti-Semitism. He therefore left as part of the era's mass Eastern European emigration following World War I, thus escaping the anti-Semitism by hiding in the boiler room of a ship to the United States. He arrived in the United States in 1921 while working as the manager for a touring acting company. With a propensity for theatrical drama, Pfefer subsequently found himself interested in the budding pro wrestling industry; and by 1924, he had begun promoting a band of Eastern European heavyweights as exotic contenders to the American champions (who would always emerge victorious over the foreign challengers in the end). Over the next five years, Pfefer gradually established himself among the region's top booking agents; and then in 1929, he eventually relocated to New York City.

== New York promoter ==
Upon arriving in the Big Apple, Jack Pfefer quickly aligned himself with renowned New York promoter Jack Curley, who then ranked among the most powerful men in the entire wrestling business. Following the break-up of the famed Gold Dust Trio in the late 1920s, Curley initiated an alliance with several of the East Coast's top bookers, including Toots Mondt and Ray Fabiani, and he subsequently formed an industry "Trust" that enabled the various regions to share their elite grappling talent. Pfefer performed as the group's main talent manager, and he was primarily responsible for scouting potential European grapplers while also overseeing the organization's financial books. Over the next few years, the Trust rode its incredibly popular centerpiece superstar, Jim Londos, to record profits while Pfefer helped lead one of the greatest periods in New York's rich wrestling history. Moreover, as Curley's health began to decline, Pfefer began to position himself among the eventual heirs to the New York wrestling throne.

== Exposing the work ==
In 1932, a contractual dispute caused an eventual rift between Curley and Londos, and the New York territory quickly deteriorated without its top drawing card. Pfefer therefore abandoned Curley in favor of Londos' group in early 1933; but later that November, a peace accord was signed between Curley's East Coast promotion and the Tom Packs/Jim Londos alliance that was dominating in the Midwest. The agreement subsequently extended the Trust's influence throughout all of North America, with Curley, Packs, Mondt, Fabiani, Ed White, and Paul Bowser all agreeing to share the profits evenly. As a result, Jack Pfefer consequently found himself without any allies, as he was stuck on the outside looking in on the industry's powerful new coalition. Ostracized by his fellow wrestling peers, a bitter Pfefer looked to exact revenge, and he therefore arranged an interview with Dan Parker, who was the sports editor for the New York Daily Mirror. Pfefer subsequently took the unprecedented step of revealing most of pro wrestling's secrets and inner workings, freely admitting the sport's "fakery" and theatrics. Although fans had long suspected that pro wrestling was worked, Pfefer had introduced a feeling of cynicism among the mainstream press that they were being used as promotional "chumps" by Curley and his associates; and in a now-famous headline, the November 19, 1934 New York Daily News covered an impending Jim Londos vs. Everett Marshall bout by proclaiming, "Londos and Marshall meet at Garden tonight for 26th time. Score - Londos 26, Marshall 0."

Pfefer again plotted against his former partners when he paid Dick Shikat to shoot on the Trust's new champion Danno O'Mahoney; and on March 2, 1936, Shikat betrayed Curley en route to "stealing" the championship. The Trust subsequently filed an injunction against Shikat; but before the trial ever got started, Toots Mondt paid Pfefer $17,000 to double-cross Haft and his champion, Ali Baba, by maneuvering the title onto Dave Levin on April 24, 1936. Pfefer then sold Levin's contract to Curley and Mondt in order to re-establish his industry ties; however, the Trust ultimately blew up when the other promoters refused to work alongside Pfefer, thus ending the alliance as each territory began promoting its separate titleholders.

== Later career ==
Jack Pfefer never retracted his stance that wrestling was more entertainment than competition; he therefore distinguished himself from his peers by presenting shows as a form of theater, with exaggerated storylines and bizarre performers. He was renowned for his booking of "freak" characters, most notably including the French Angel (Maurice Tillet) and the Swedish Angel (Nils Filip "Phil" Oloffson [1906–1974]), whom Pfefer promoted based on their hideous looks. Moreover, Pfefer initiated numerous innovations, including such novelties as feature tag team bouts and midget wrestling. He also possessed a great eye for young talent, as he was instrumental in launching the career of Buddy Rogers; and he also served as a chief promoter of women's grappling, booking the likes of Mildred Burke and the Fabulous Moolah over several decades. It was also Pfefer who helped the legendary Sam Muchnick promote his first show in 1945; in subsequent years, he constantly shifted his base of operations, running territories in Toledo, Nashville, Boston, and on the West Coast while solidifying his place among the industry's top marketers. However, while working as an agent for promoter Fred Kohler in the 1960s, Pfefer was largely blamed for ruining the Chicago territory when he booked a number of sound-alike performers like "Bummy Rogers", "Hobo Brazil", and "Bruno Sanmartino", thus repelling most of the industry's top-flight talent. Nonetheless, he continued booking matches until 1967. He died on September 13, 1974, while at a Massachusetts nursing home. To this day, he remains one of the business's most controversial figures, yet he is also acknowledged among its most imaginative promoters.

== Personal life ==
Pfefer was close friends with many of the wrestling personalities he worked with and had a habit of sending gifts to their families. Stu Hart took a great liking to him and asked him to be the godfather of Hart's tenth child and seventh son, Ross Hart.

== Accomplishments ==
- Professional Wrestling Hall of Fame and Museum (Class of 2007)
