= Gold Dust Trio =

Group of professional wrestling promoters

The Gold Dust Trio was a group of promoters who controlled the world of professional wrestling during the 1920s while also making several fundamental changes to the industry's business model and operations that would ultimately change the direction of the sport toward pseudo-competitive exhibition. The Trio was composed of the era's dominant World Heavyweight Champion Ed "Strangler" Lewis and his manager Billy Sandow, as well as fellow wrestler and creative visionary Joseph "Toots" Mondt.

== Background ==
Key moves in the evolution of professional wrestling are often credited to Joseph "Toots" Mondt. Born in Iowa on January 18, 1894, he grew up in Greeley, Colorado, where he learned the art of wrestling through a correspondence course administered by grappling guru Martin "Farmer" Burns, who had been the nation's preeminent professional wrestler during the late nineteenth century. At age 16, Mondt made his debut on the carnival circuit; and a few years later, he toured with Burns himself, where he was given the nickname "Toots" (since he was the youngest member of the group). Under Burns' expert direction, Mondt became one of the sport's most dangerous "hookers;" and he was eventually recruited to join the camp of the great Ed "Strangler" Lewis. Perhaps the most dominant pro wrestler ever, Lewis (real name: Robert Friedrich) was born on June 30, 1891, and was a rising contender throughout the early 1910s before meeting Billy Sandow in late 1914. Born Wilhelm Bauman in 1884, Sandow was a 155-pound champion in the early 1900s, taking his name from the famous 19th century strongman Eugen Sandow. Sandow had operated several health clubs, but he lost his business in a failed gamble when he was defeated by veteran grappler Fred Beell. He then barnstormed throughout the South while guiding such wrestlers as Marin Plestina and Billy Jenkins; and upon trouping through Kentucky, he even wrestled Lewis in a handicap bout. But by late 1914, Lewis parted ways with his manager Jerry Walls; and he and Sandow then formed a business partnership that would eventually propel Lewis to the World Heavyweight Title just a few years later.

== Slam-bang Western style ==
In the early 1920s, Sandow was looking for a grappler to serve as Lewis' sparring partner and fill-in opponent; and with Burns' recommendation, Mondt was hired as the group's "enforcer", disciplining Lewis' opponents as to the bout's rules while helping to prevent the champ from any injury as a result of foul tactics. At the time, pro wrestling consisted primarily of mat grappling; and while the sport had flourished a decade earlier under Frank Gotch, the fans had since grown tired of the painfully deliberate pace of the bouts. Mondt discovered a solution that would completely transform the industry, as he convinced Lewis and Sandow to implement a new form of wrestling that combined features of boxing, Greco-Roman, freestyle, lumbercamp fighting, and theater into what he deemed "slam-bang Western-style wrestling". This new style of action (which included radical moves like body slams, suplexes, arm drags, and the addition of fisticuffs) combined with traditional mat grappling to create what has essentially become the modern form of pro wrestling. The new style was an instant success with the fans; and although many bouts had been "fixed" in prior years, it was Mondt who perfected the art of the "finish", a scripted conclusion to matches that gave fans an exciting show and inspired them to come back for more. It is said that Mondt personally invented 90% of the finishes and 60% of the finishing holds; and in the process, he also invented the concept of the "no contest", which included such innovations as time-limit draws and double countouts. Consequently, it was this exaggerated new ring style that necessitated the industry's gradual shift away from its legitimate roots and toward full-time exhibition of holds and maneuvers to entertain the crowd.

== First modern promotion ==
Lewis, Sandow, and Mondt (later deemed "The Gold Dust Trio" in the 1937 book Fall Guys) looked to promote wrestling's new style on a much greater scale, and they soon took over the bookings of their own matches. As interest grew, cards moved from old burlesque theaters to major sports venues; and due to the larger gate receipts, Sandow was able to recruit hundreds of grapplers to join their stable. A shrewd business manager, Sandow signed wrestlers to exclusive contracts (a radical move for the time); and he subsequently decimated the talent pool for rival bookers. As the central agency for the touring wrestlers, the Trio thus established themselves as the industry's first nationwide promotion, and they gained credibility by paying their wrestlers on time (which was uncommon for the era). Moreover, they came up with the idea of presenting pro wrestling as a packaged product, and they were the first to book ongoing storylines while promoting the same bouts as the circuit traveled from city to city.

Within a year, the Gold Dust Trio took complete control over the pro wrestling industry. Easily the world's elite shoot wrestler, Lewis held the World Title throughout the 1920s; and with the promotional backing of Sandow and Mondt, he soon became a national superstar. Yet, the Trio recognized that fans would eventually grow tired of one man dominating the belt, and so Lewis agreed to occasionally "put over" a popular challenger to generate renewed interest (especially since he was skilled enough to regain the belt any time he pleased). Thus became the practice of "working" a match, and wrestling "programs" (a series of bouts meant to build up a specific wrestler as a suitable contender) were born. In the process, the Trio established a hierarchy for their talent, as only legitimate grapplers were ever considered as champions; though inferior wrestlers who possessed charisma or ethnic appeal were often "pushed" as challengers to attract specific fan bases or regions. As feared "hookers", Mondt and John Pesek served as the circuit's "coppers" who would rough up anyone who ever betrayed the pre-arranged plan, yet such events were infrequent as wrestlers now made far more money under the Trio than they ever had before.

== Legacy ==
The Gold Dust Trio eventually dissolved in 1928 when Mondt engaged in a power struggle with Sandow's brother Max Bauman, and Lewis and Sandow soon split up as well when Sandow objected to Lewis' lack of conditioning. Sandow later managed such championship grapplers as Everett Marshall and Roy Dunn, and he ultimately died on September 15, 1972, at age 88. Ed Lewis retired in 1947 as the first 5-time World Champion in history, and he later served as the trainer and manager to eventual 6-time World Champion Lou Thesz before he ultimately died at age 76 on August 7, 1966. Meanwhile, Toots Mondt would become one of the industry's most powerful brokers, as he partnered with Ray Fabiani in promoting the rise of legendary champion Jim Londos while also training such future stars as Antonino Rocca and Stu Hart. After Jack Curley's death in 1937, Mondt then worked with Rudy Dusek, Jack Pfefer, and others in establishing the Northeast as one of wrestling's top territories. Moreover, Mondt would later serve as the mentor for Vince McMahon, Sr., with whom he teamed to form the World Wide Wrestling Federation (now WWE, Inc.) in 1963, and it was Mondt who pushed Bruno Sammartino as the company's first real star, though he sold his WWWF stake to McMahon prior to his death on June 11, 1976.

Damien Sandow, who had the gimmick of an intellectual pedant, adopted his ring name in honor of Billy Sandow. The name of Dustin Runnels' wrestling gimmick of Goldust was partially inspired by the Gold Dust Trio, and partially by his father Virgil's ring name, Dusty Rhodes. In turn, Goldust served as inspiration for Dustin's brother Cody's ringname, Stardust.
