= Tom Packs =

Greek-American professional wrestling promoter (1894-1964)

Personal information
- Born: August 15, 1894 Poulithra, Arcadia, Greece
- Died: October 22, 1964 (aged 70) St. Louis, Missouri, United States

Professional wrestling career
- Ring name: Tom Packs
- Debut: c. 1920

Thomas Nicholas Packs (born Anthanasios Pakiotis Greek: Αθανάσιος Πακιώτης; August 15, 1894 – October 22, 1964) was a Greek-American professional wrestling promoter. He was one of the top promoters over the first half of the 20th century and was responsible for building one of the nation's most prestigious wrestling territories in St. Louis.

== Youth ==
Anthanasios Pakiotis was born in Poulithra, Arcadia, Greece on August 15, 1894, though he would eventually become part of the flood of turn-of-the-century Eastern European immigrants when his parents brought him to the United States in 1907. Upon entering the country, his name was anglicized to Thomas Nicholas Packs; and his family then settled in Chicago, which subsequently played host to a pro wrestling boom period during his teenage years (as Packs thus witnessed the sport's two high-profile encounters between Georg Hackenschmidt and Frank Gotch). Moreover, one of Packs' relatives, John Contos, had begun promoting wrestling matches in St. Louis during the early 1920s, and Packs subsequently joined him in 1922 as a partner at age 28.

== Wrestling career ==
Though just starting out in the business, Tom Packs quickly distinguished himself as a crafty promoter and a shrewd businessman. After the rise of the Gold Dust Trio in the early 1920s, Packs astutely recognized the industry's emerging shift from legitimate contests towards worked results; and he began engaging in the practice of "trading" the world title with other promoters. In return for a fee, Packs would instruct his region's "champion" to drop the belt to a grappler from another territory, thus boosting the new champion's credibility with fans while concurrently earning additional revenues for himself. Regardless, Packs retained control over the title itself, and he was not above stripping the belt from a dishonest competitor who failed to go along with the pre-arranged plan. Consequently, Packs was able to raise fan interest while also increasing the gate receipts; and before long, he incorporated Tom Packs Sport Enterprises, which soon established itself as the area's top sports franchise while promoting both wrestling and boxing events. Then in 1930, Packs officially joined the National Wrestling Association, a division of the National Boxing Association that maintained control over various state athletic commissions.

By the early 1930s, the professional wrestling industry was in transition following the break-up of the Gold Dust Trio and amidst the economic vacuum left by the Great Depression. Nevertheless, the industry soon discovered a new gate attraction in Jim Londos, who had emerged as the sport's premier superstar while competing in the New York territory. After defeating Dick Shikat for the World Heavyweight Title in June 1930, Londos' drawing power was in high demand; and his manager Ed White consequently commanded a hefty price from New York promoters Jack Curley and Toots Mondt for Londos' services. As a result, when White and Mondt became embroiled in a bitter contractual dispute in 1932, Tom Packs swooped in and formed an alliance with White, who was also a chief promoter in the Chicago territory along with Charlie & Willie Johnson. The end result was a vicious promotional war for wrestling supremacy, with Curley and Mondt heading up the Eastern contingent, while Packs and White ruled the Midwestern territories. However, while Packs' group flourished with Londos selling out arenas across the nation, Mondt was eventually forced to turn to an aging and out of shape Ed Strangler Lewis as his primary talent. Consequently, the New York territory was crippled following Londos' exit, and Curley was eventually forced to broker an agreement with Packs that established a working "Trust" between the country's various wrestling territories.

By the time of Jack Curley's death in 1937, Tom Packs had already emerged as a powerful promoter. Over the years, he subsequently helped groom a number of the sport's top wrestlers, including Bill Longson, Abe Coleman, Orville Brown, and Fred Blassie. Moreover, it was Packs who was responsible for nurturing Lou Thesz to his territory in 1936. The top student of renowned "hooker" George Tragos, Thesz was just 20 years old when he first arrived in St. Louis, yet Packs immediately recognized his superstar potential. He subsequently protected his investment by keeping him away from the region's most dangerous opponents while he honed his ring skills. As a result, Thesz eventually became the youngest World Heavyweight Champion in history when he defeated Everett Marshall on December 29, 1937.

== Power struggle ==
In 1932, Tom Packs would also hire a young sportswriter named Sam Muchnick to serve as his main publicist. Muchnick had previously worked for the St. Louis Times, where he met Packs while covering the area's events. But after the Times merged with St. Louis Star, Muchnick rejected a management position when one of his close friends was bumped from the staff; and he instead agreed to join Packs' promotion handling the company's finances and public relations. For nine years, Muchnick served alongside Packs as his right-hand man and chief apprentice; however, their relationship took a sour turn after Packs promoted a heavyweight boxing bout between Joe Louis and Tony Musto on April 8, 1941. The fight was a huge success, selling out the Kiel Auditorium as Packs collected $67,000 in revenues while earning $14,000 in profits. However, Muchnick took exception when Packs issued him a paltry $200 bonus for the event (as opposed to the standard 10% commission); and he consequently left Packs to start a competing promotion. Nevertheless, Packs used his vast industry connections to prevent Muchnick from securing any of the sport's big names; and with Packs controlling all of the premier superstars, Muchnick was thus forced to enlist aging veterans for his shows. As a result, it was Packs who continued to maintain his dominance over Muchnick at the box office throughout the decade.

== Later years ==
Following World War II, Packs was eventually forced to relinquish his promotion after losing $350,000 in the stock market. And so, in 1947, he sold Tom Packs Sport Enterprises, Inc. to the Mississippi Valley Sports Club, which was headed by Lou Thesz, Bill Longson and Frank Tunney. In subsequent years, Thesz would eventually merge the operation with Sam Muchnick's group after the formation of the National Wrestling Alliance; and the two Packs protégés would eventually go on to rule the sport for the next three decades while establishing St. Louis as the capital of the wrestling world. Meanwhile, Packs continued to stay involved in event promotions as he ran the Thrill Circus throughout the 1950s before he died on October 22, 1964. Though his name is not well known amongst today's fans, his place in history remains secure as the foremost pioneer of wrestling's celebrated St. Louis territory.

== Championships and accomplishments ==
- Wrestling Observer Newsletter
  - Wrestling Observer Newsletter Hall of Fame (Class of 2007)

== See also ==
- List of professional wrestling promoters
