= Ivan Mamutoff =

Russian amateur wrestler (born 1882)

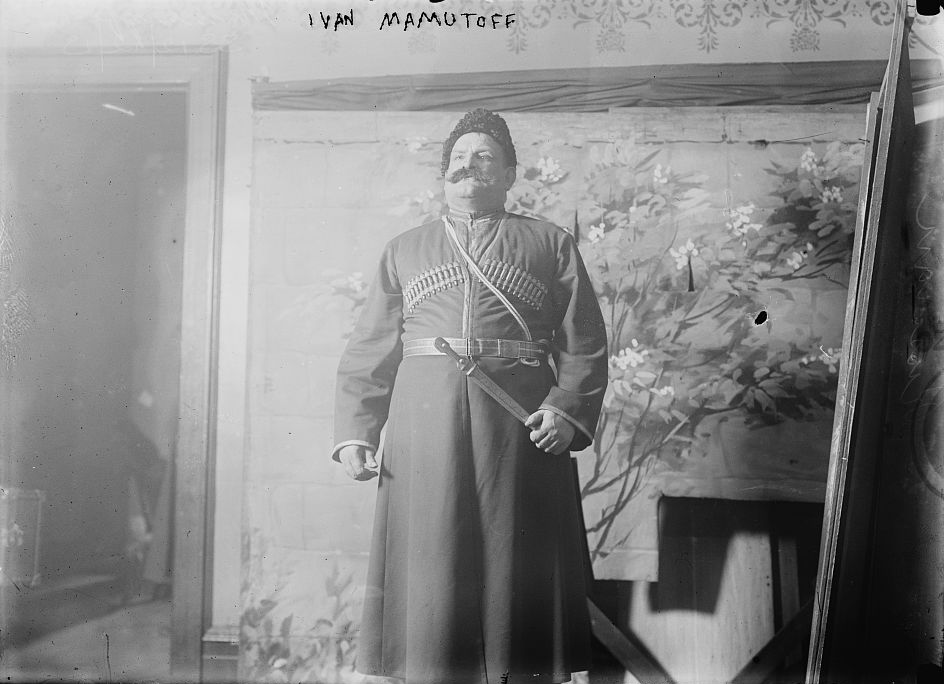
Mamutoff in 1913

Ivan Mamutoff (1882-?) was a Graeco-Roman wrestler from St. Petersburg, Russia. He toured the United States in 1913 and hoped to challenge Frank Gotch in a match.

== Biography ==
In 1899 he beat Georg Hackenschmidt and Johan Kock in Graeco-Roman matches. He arrived in the United States in 1913 aboard the SS Ryndam hoping to challenge Frank Gotch in a match. In 1914 he challenged Wladek Zbyszko.
