= Stanislaus Zbyszko =

Polish strongman and professional wrestler (1880–1967)

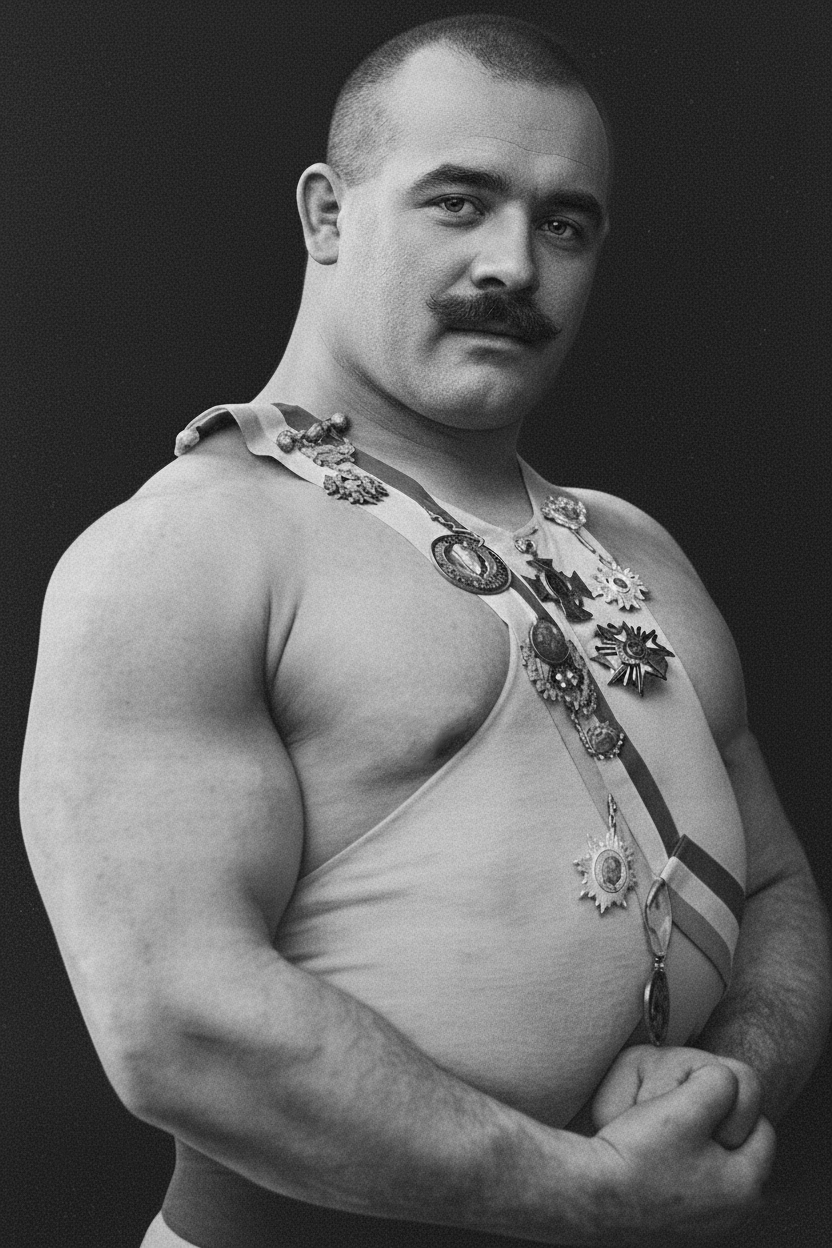
- Zbyszko c. 1906

Personal information
- Born: Stanisław Jan Cyganiewicz; April 1, 1880 Jodłowa, Austria-Hungary (now Poland)
- Died: September 23, 1967 (aged 88) St. Joseph, Missouri, U.S.
- Family: Wladek Zbyszko (brother)

Professional wrestling career
- Ring name: Stanislaus Zbyszko
- Billed height: 5 ft 8 in (1.73 m)
- Billed weight: 230 lb (100 kg)
- Billed from: Vienna, Austria
- Trained by: Władysław Pytlasiński
- Debut: 1901
- Retired: 1934

Signature
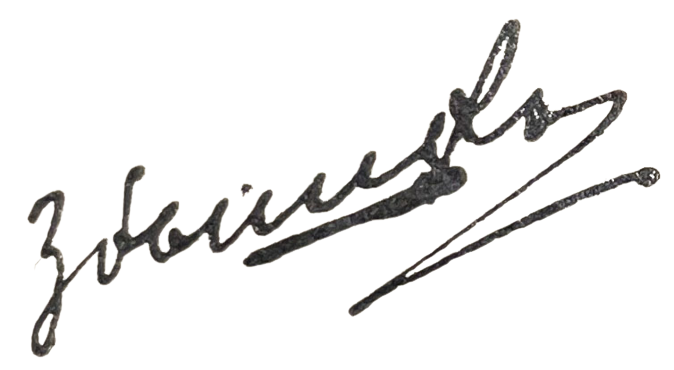

Stanisław Jan Cyganiewicz (April 1, 1880 – September 23, 1967), better known by his ring name Stanislaus Zbyszko (also written Zbysco), was a Polish strongman, catch wrestler, and professional wrestler. He was a three-time World Heavyweight Champion in the United States during the 1920s.

== Early life ==
Stanislaus Cyganiewicz was born on April 1, 1880, in Jodłowa near Kraków, then Austria. His brother was Władek Zbyszko (1891–1968), also a wrestler. He studied music, philosophy, and law while growing up in Vienna. Standing 5 ft 8 in (1.73 m) and weighing 260 pounds, Cyganiewicz joined the Vindobona Athletic Club while in college, where he developed a strong physique. He also participated in the Sokół, a Polish patriotic gymnastic society focused on the physical, mental, and cultural advancement of its members, as well as promoting discipline and patriotism.

Towards the end of the 19th century, Cyganiewicz entered the wrestling industry after defeating an experienced grappler at a local circus in Poland. He was then recruited to Berlin by a local promoter. Inspired by strongman George Hackenschmidt, who had become Europe's premier grappling star, Cyganiewicz pursued a career in wrestling. He was introduced to professional wrestling by the Polish grappler Władysław Pytlasiński, who became his mentor.

== Wrestling career ==
Over the next few years, Cyganiewicz gradually established himself among Europe's fastest rising Greco-Roman wrestlers while competing in various tournaments. By 1903, Health & Strength listed him among the continent's leading heavyweights. He eventually adopted the ring name Stanislaus Zbyszko. The surname Zbyszko was a nickname given to him by friends due to his bravery as a child. The name originates from a fictional medieval Polish knight in the historical novel The Knights of the Cross by Henryk Sienkiewicz, published in 1900.

In 1906, he battled Russia's "Cossack" Ivan Poddubny to a two-hour draw and later won a prestigious tournament in Paris by outlasting Georg Lurich and Constant le Marin. He was brought to England by Charles "C.B." Cochrane, previously Hackenschmidt's manager, and engaged in prominent matches against Turkey's "Champion of the Bosphorus" Kara Suliman at the London Pavilion and the Gibbons music halls. A major controversy arose when it was revealed that Suliman was actually Bulgaria's Ivan Offtharoff, employed by Zbyszko and Cochrane, marking one of the earliest public revelations of wrestling's "theatrical hoaxes".

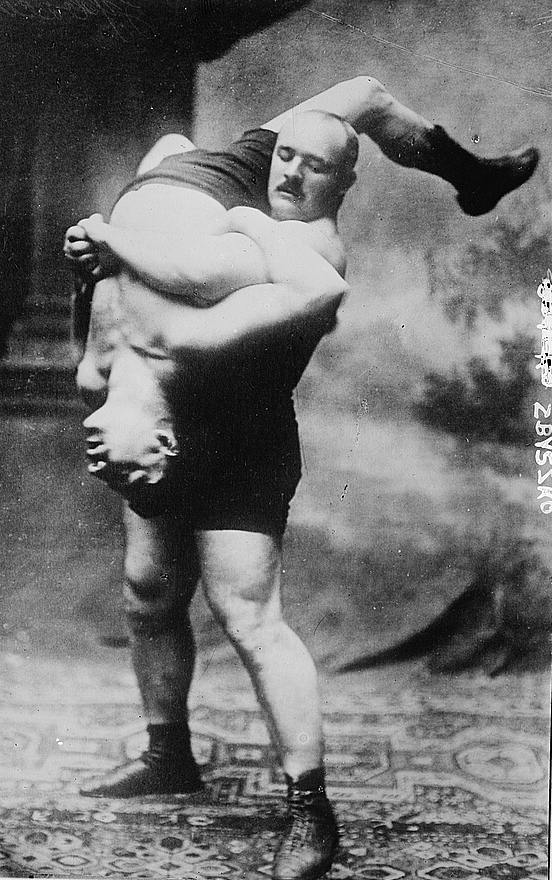
Zbyszko in 1913

As Zbyszko started to compete more often in England and the United States, he transitioned to catch-as-catch-can freestyle wrestling, alternating between grappling styles as he traveled between continents and countries. Already billed as Europe's Greco-Roman champion, he was recognized among the world's top catch wrestlers after fighting Frank Gotch to a one-hour draw in November 1909 in Buffalo, NY. The following year, he achieved notable victories over Dr. Ben Roller and the Terrible Turk Youssuf Mahmout, solidifying his reputation among the world's elite grapplers. He set up a highly anticipated rematch with Gotch at the Chicago Coliseum on June 1, 1910, for the undisputed World Heavyweight Championship. However, Gotch pinned Zbyszko in just 6.4 seconds, which led to controversy and protests from Zbyszko.

Despite the controversial loss, Zbyszko was regarded as one of the premier wrestlers in the world. He then faced the challenge of India's undefeated champion, the Great Gama, in the finals of the John Bull World Championships in London on September 10, 1910. The match ended in a draw after nearly three hours, with Zbyszko employing a defensive strategy. The two were set to face each other again on September 17, 1910, but Zbyszko did not appear, and Gama was declared the winner by default. Over the next decade, Zbyszko competed in Europe while his younger brother, Wladek, while establishing himself among the top stars in the United States.

In 1927, it was announced that the Great Gama and Zbyszko would face each other again. They met for a highly anticipated rematch in 1928 in Patiala, which resulted in a win for Gama, who threw Zbyszko in 42 seconds.

== Championship controversy ==
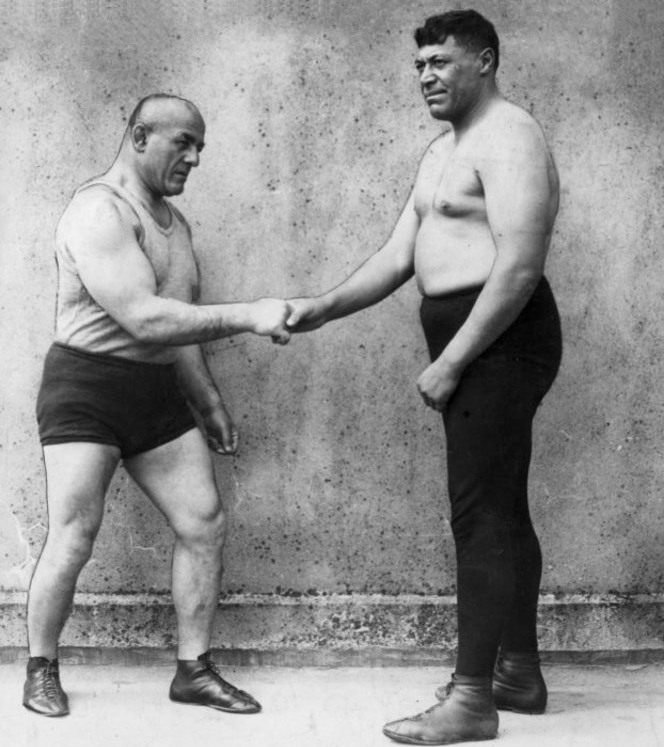
Ike Robin (right) and Stanislaus Zbyszko, still billed a world champion, shake hands before their 1926 bout in Auckland, New Zealand.

By this time, the industry had begun a gradual shift towards works; and Stanislaus Zbyszko was eventually recruited back to the U.S. by the "Gold Dust Trio" of Strangler Lewis, Billy Sandow, and Toots Mondt. Though now in his early 40s, Zbyszko was booked to defeat Lewis for the World Title on May 6, 1921; but his reign was ultimately a bust at the box office, and he relinquished the title back to Lewis on March 3, 1922. Around this time, a disagreement caused Joe Stecher to split from the Gold Dust Trio promotion, thus forming a separate wrestling faction. Zbyszko remained with the Trio, who were promoting ex-football player Wayne Munn as a charismatic new champion. In order to build up Munn's credibility, the Trio booked him to successfully defend the title against Zbyszko on April 15, 1925; however, Zbyszko had secretly accepted a payoff from Tony Stecher (Joe's brother/manager) to switch to their company. Consequently, Zbyszko betrayed the Trio by turning the match with Munn into a legitimate shoot, pinning the non-wrestler again and again until the referee was forced to award the title to the 47-year-old veteran, who then dropped the title to Stecher a month later to complete the ploy. This was one of the last times a World Title changed hands legitimately; and the legacy of this conspiracy was momentous, as it would be decades before promoters would ever feel comfortable putting their title on a non-wrestler again, thus fueling the support for expert "hooker" Lou Thesz to serve as a champion throughout the 1930s, 1940s, 1950s, and 1960s.

== Retirement ==
In 1928, Zbyszko received a lucrative offer to wrestle the Great Gama in a rematch of their bout from 18 years earlier. Despite both men being past their primes, the match reportedly drew 60,000 fans and saw Great Gama defeat Zbyszko in 40 seconds. Following this match, Zbyszko retired and began scouting wrestling talent in South America, where he discovered Antonino Rocca, a multi-talented athlete who became one of the sport's biggest stars.

From their farm in Missouri, the Zbyszko brothers trained future legends Johnny Valentine and Harley Race. Stanislaus also had a supporting role in the British film noir Night and the City. Director Jules Dassin cast Zbyszko for his authenticity as a wrestler. Dassin recalled that Zbyszko was a "beautiful, cultured, multilingual man" who embodied the image of a wrestler from his youth. Zbyszko often expressed his dissatisfaction with the industry's evolution into a form of showmanship.

Stanislaus Zbyszko died of a heart attack on September 23, 1967, at age 88. He was praised by Strangler Lewis as one of the best legitimate wrestlers of all time. In tribute, his surname was later adopted by Larry Zbyszko.

In 1983, Stanislaus Zbyszko was inducted into the National Polish American Sports Hall of Fame.

He was ranked 95 out of 100 wrestlers for Dave Meltzer's Top 100 Wrestlers of all time in 2002.

== Championships and accomplishments ==
- George Tragos/Lou Thesz Professional Wrestling Hall of Fame
  - Class of 2010
- International Professional Wrestling Hall of Fame
  - Class of 2021
- Professional Wrestling Hall of Fame
  - Pioneer Era inductee in 2003
- Wrestling Observer Newsletter
  - Wrestling Observer Newsletter Hall of Fame (Class of 1996)
- Other titles:
  - World Heavyweight Championship (Catch as Catch Can version) (3 times)
  - World Greco-Roman Heavyweight Championship

== Filmography ==
Year	Title	Role	Notes
1932	Madison Square Garden	Himself	
1950	Night and the City	Gregorius	(final film role)
