= Koutsopodi =

Koutsopodi Κουτσοπόδι
- Municipal unit
- Location within the regional unit

- Location within Greece
- Coordinates: 37°41′N 22°43′E
- Country: Greece
- Administrative region: Peloponnese
- Regional unit: Argolis
- Municipality: Argos-Mykines

Area
  - Municipal unit: 121.1 km^{2} (46.8 sq mi)

Population (2021)
  - Municipal unit: 3,254
  - Municipal unit density: 26.87/km^{2} (69.59/sq mi)
  - Community: 2,278
- Time zone: UTC+2 (EET)
  - Summer (DST): UTC+3 (EEST)
- Vehicle registration: AP

Koutsopodi (Greek: Κουτσοπόδι) is a town and a former municipality in Argolis, Peloponnese, Greece. Since the 2011 local government reform it is part of the municipality Argos-Mykines, of which it is a municipal unit. The municipal unit has an area of 121.069 km^{2}. Population 3,254 (2021). The Legendary Greek American professional wrestler Christos Theofilou (Jim Londos) was born and raised here.
