= Wayne Munn =

American professional wrestler and football player (1896–1931)

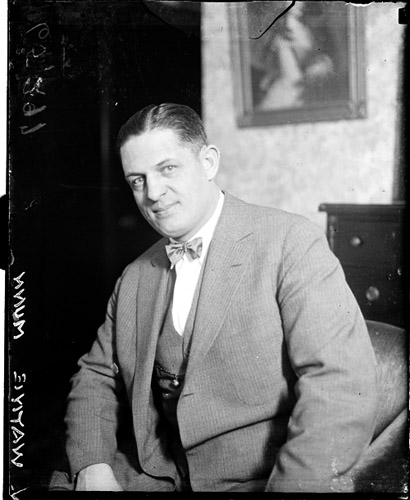
- Munn in 1925

Personal information
- Born: February 19, 1896 Colby, Kansas, U.S.
- Died: January 9, 1931 (aged 34) Fort Sam Houston, San Antonio, Texas, U.S.
- Cause of death: Bright's disease
- Education: University of Nebraska

Professional wrestling career
- Ring name: Wayne Munn
- Billed height: 6 ft 6 in (198 cm)
- Billed weight: 230 lb (104 kg)
- Trained by: Mike Gibbons
- Debut: 1924
- Retired: 1926
- Military service
- Allegiance: United States
- Branch: United States Army
- Rank: First lieutenant
- Conflicts: World War I

Wayne Munn (February 19, 1896 – January 9, 1931) was an American professional wrestler and collegiate football player from the University of Nebraska. As a wrestler, Munn was a World Heavyweight Champion. His world title win is historic as it was the first time that a pure performer (as opposed to a legitimately skilled wrestler) had won a world championship in professional wrestling.

== Professional wrestling career ==
Munn's fame from playing football attracted the attention of wrestling star, Ed Lewis and promoters Toots Mondt and Billy Sandow, who prematurely pushed Munn as the next big star in the sport. Munn won the World title from Lewis in 1925, despite his limited wrestling and shoot fighting ability. This backfired on Lewis and his camp, as Munn subsequently lost the title to Stanislaus Zbyszko in a famous double-cross, as Zbyszko legitimately pinned Munn, despite agreeing to lose to him prior to the match. Munn, unable to defend himself against Zbyszko's holds, was beaten decisively. Munn held the title for a little over three months.

Munn went into retirement shortly afterwards, and spent some years in the oil business, before his death from kidney problems at the Fort Sam Houston base hospital in San Antonio, Texas on January 9, 1931. He was survived by his wife and a daughter, Mary Ann Munn.

Munn had also served as an infantry first lieutenant during World War I.

== Championships and accomplishments ==
- National Wrestling Association
  - World Heavyweight Wrestling Championship (1 time)
- Nebraska Pro Wrestling Hall of Fame
  - Class of 2022
