= Kola Kwariani =

Georgian wrestler and chess player (1903–1980)

Personal information
- Born: Nicholas Nestor Kwariani; January 16, 1903 Kutaisi, Kutais Governorate, Russian Empire
- Died: February 27, 1980 (aged 77) New York City, U.S.

Professional wrestling career
- Ring name(s): Nick the Wrestler; Nicholas Kwariani
- Billed weight: 280 lb (130 kg)

Nicholas Nestor "Kola" Kwariani (Georgian: კოლა (კოლია) ქვარიანი) (January 16, 1903 – February 27, 1980), known by the ring name Nick the Wrestler, was a Georgian professional wrestler and chess player.

== Early life ==
Kwariani was born in Kutaisi, in the Republic of Georgia, the son of Nestor and Caserines (née Kesaria) Kwariani.

== Professional wrestling career ==
Kwariani had been a Greco-Roman champion in Europe before World War II and a professional wrestler in the United States afterward. He participated in many wrestling matches, most famously with "Mr. America" Gene Stanlee, which was featured as one of the top 10 matches of the wrestling Golden Era in the U.S. From 1959 to 1960, he coached Antonino Rocca. From 1959 to 1962, he closely worked with Bruno Sammartino.

== Chess career ==
According to Chess Review magazine, Kwariani was the only chess-playing professional wrestler in the U.S. In the 1950s, he was an active player at the Chess and Checker Club in New York City, also known as "The Flea House".

== Other media ==
Kwariani had a role in Stanley Kubrick's 1956 film The Killing, in the role of chess-playing wrestler Maurice Oboukhoff, who is hired to start a fight to create a diversion during a heist. A picture of Kwariani, Kubrick, and Sterling Hayden appeared on the cover of Chess Review magazine in March 1956.

== Death ==
In February 1980, while entering the Chess and Checker Club, Kwariani was seriously injured after being assaulted by a group of teenagers. The incident was later described by Samuel Sloan: "Nick came in the downstairs entrance one evening when about five black youths were leaving. They bumped into each other. Words were exchanged. Nick never took any guff from anybody and soon he was engaged in a fight with all five black kids at once. Nick probably could still have handled any one or two of them, but five were too many. Nick was beaten." He was then taken to a hospital, where he died at age 77. He was predeceased by his wife, Sidonia (Novak) Kwariani.

== Filmography ==
- The Killing (1956) - Maurice Oboukhoff
