= Gene Stanlee =

American professional wrestler

Personal information
- Born: Eugene Stanley Zygowicz; January 1, 1917 Chicago, Illinois, U.S.
- Died: September 23, 2005 (aged 88) Los Angeles, California, U.S.

Professional wrestling career
- Ring name: Gene Stanlee
- Debut: April 26, 1946

Eugene Stanley Zygowicz (January 1, 1917 – September 23, 2005) was an American professional wrestler, better known by his ring name "Mr. America" Gene Stanlee.

== Early life ==
Zygowicz was born in Avondale, Chicago, to Victoria and Paul Zygowicz, Polish immigrants. He was one of 15 children; his younger brother Paul wrestled as Steve Stanlee.

At age five, Zygowicz fell down a flight of stairs and was temporarily paralyzed. He later attributed his recovery in part to seeing a strongman at a church; he began wrestling and competing against other boys at age eight and built a home gym from iron collected at a railyard.

During World War II, Zygowicz served as a machinist aboard a U.S. Navy floating repair ship. Following his discharge, wrestling promoters used the publicity he had received as the "pinup boy of the Navy".

== Professional wrestling career ==
According to wrestling historian Fred Hornby, Stanlee's first professional match was against Leo Kirilenko in Milwaukee on April 26, 1946. His early matches were in the Chicago–Milwaukee area.

Stanlee faced Antonio Rocca in New York during the early 1950s. He became known for his showmanship, including colorful ring jackets and monogrammed towels.

== Later life ==
After retiring from wrestling, Stanlee worked as a personal trainer in the Los Angeles area, offering advice on diet and exercise from his Redondo Beach home. In 2000, he was honored at the Cauliflower Alley Club banquet and reunion in Las Vegas.

== Championships and accomplishments ==
- Championship Wrestling from Florida
  - NWA Southern Heavyweight Championship (Florida version) (1 time)
- Midwest Wrestling Association
  - MWA Heavyweight Championship (Ohio Version) (1 time)
- Worldwide Wrestling Associates
  - WWA International Television Tag Team Championship (1 time) – with Sandor Szabo
