= Joe Stecher =

American professional wrestler (1893–1974)

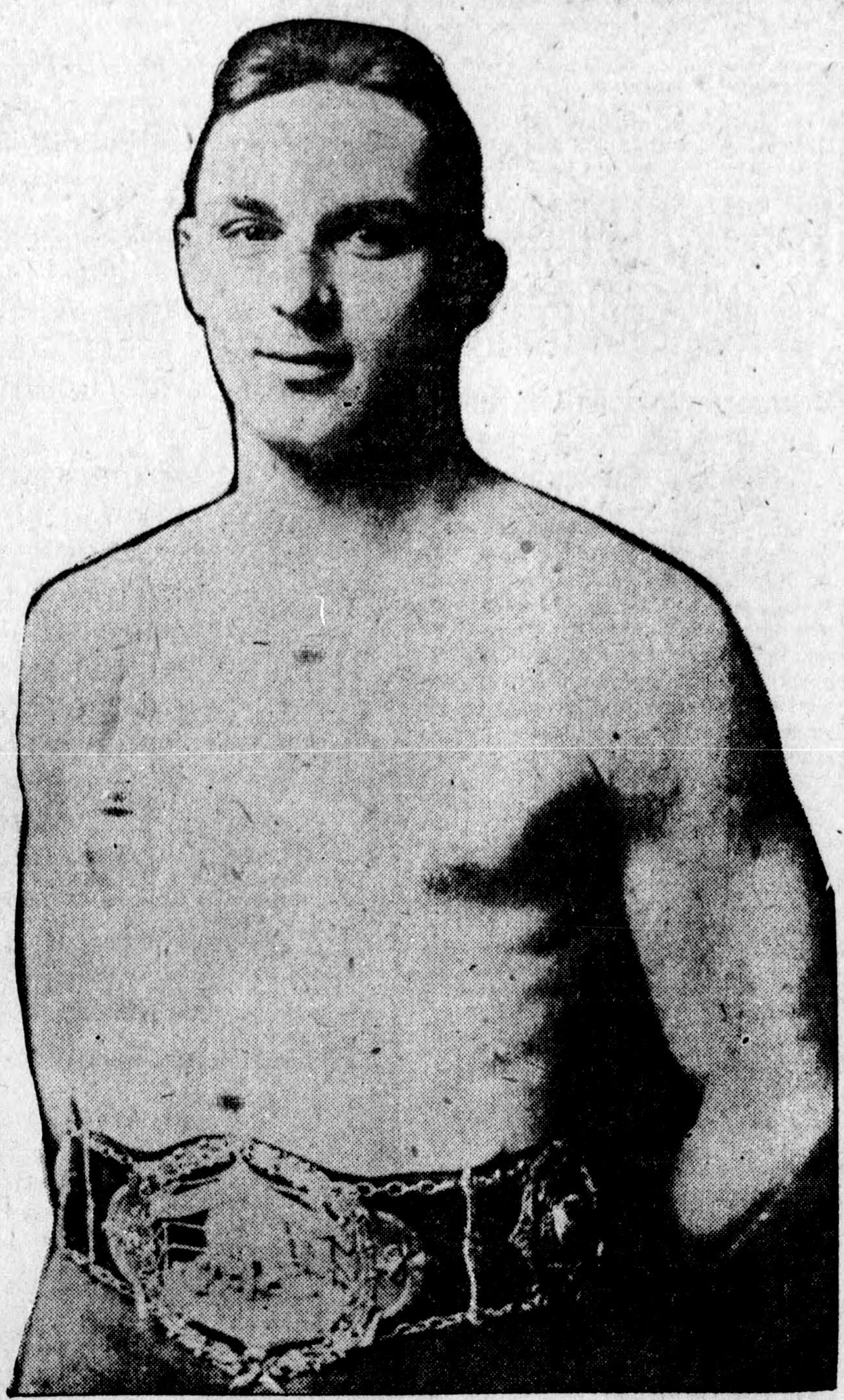

Personal information
- Born: April 4, 1893 Dodge, Nebraska, U.S.
- Died: March 29, 1974 (aged 80) St. Cloud, Minnesota, U.S.

Professional wrestling career
- Ring name: Joe Stecher
- Billed height: 6 ft 1 in (1.85 m)
- Billed weight: 220 lb (100 kg)
- Debut: 1912
- Retired: 1934

Joe Stecher (April 4, 1893 – March 29, 1974), sometimes spelled Joe Stetcher, was an American professional wrestler and three-time World Heavyweight Wrestling Champion. Known for his ferocity, tremendous leg strength and extensive knowledge of the sport, Stecher is considered to be one of the greatest wrestlers of all time. In 2000, Stecher was inducted into the George Tragos/Lou Thesz Professional Wrestling Hall of Fame.

== Early life ==
The son of Bohemian immigrants, Joseph "Joe" Stecher was born on April 4, 1893, on a 400-acre (1.6 km^{2}) farm in Dodge, Nebraska. Joe was the youngest of the family's eight children, and as a youth, he excelled in numerous sports, including swimming, golf, tennis, and baseball. While the boys were still young, Frank Stecher enrolled his three sons in a wrestling course at the local Fremont YMCA, and Joe's older brothers soon emerged as accomplished amateur grapplers. Joe's eldest brother, Lewis, would earn a commission to Annapolis, and as a Lieutenant Commander in the U.S. Navy, he was eventually recognized as the National Intercollegiate Light Heavyweight Wrestling Champion. Moreover, Anton ("Tony") Stecher starred as the premier wrestler at Fremont High School; and as a result, Joe was determined to follow in his brothers' large footsteps. From the moment he took the mat, it was clear that Joe was a natural wrestling talent, as he utilized his strong body and long limbs to outclass his opponents. Then in 1909, as a high school senior at just age 16, he nearly defeated "Doc" Benjamin Roller, one of the world's top turn-of-the-century grapplers, in a hard-fought exhibition bout while Roller was touring the Midwest.

== Professional wrestling career ==
=== Early career ===
In 1912, both Joe and Tony Stecher decided to join the professional ranks; and Joe easily defeated Bill Hokief in his first pro match. After a few months, it soon became apparent that Joe, who was taller and heavier than his older brother, was also the clearly superior grappler. However, Tony possessed greater savvy for the business; and so he subsequently became Joe's trainer and co-manager along with Joe Hetmanek (who had previously served as the Dodge postmaster). During this time, he also developed freakishly strong leg muscles as he practiced squeezing 100-pound sacks of grain on the farm until they would ultimately burst. He was also said to have practiced said squeezes on pigs and even a mule. As a result, Stecher soon became renowned for his feared leg scissors submission hold, which subsequently earned him the nickname of "The Scissors King". Nevertheless, Stecher would not gain national awareness until attracting the attention of the fabled "Farmer" Martin Burns, the former American Heavyweight Champion who was also the mentor to the now-current World Heavyweight Wrestling Champion, Frank Gotch. While touring the area, Burns planned to sucker the area gamblers by offering cash to any local wrestler who could defeat his "strongman", who just happened to be world-class hooker Yussiff Hussane, one of wrestling's feared "Terrible Turks". This was a standard con for Burns' group, and when young Stecher accepted the offer, nobody anticipated that he would pose a legitimate challenge. However, Stecher proceeded to outwrestle the great champion, and when he finally slapped on his patented scissors hold after 45 minutes, a desperate Hussane was disqualified for biting Stecher's leg.

=== World Heavyweight Wrestling Champion ===
In the following years, Stecher continued his ascent by defeating established grapplers like Jess Westergaard, Ad Santel, Bob Managoff Sr., Marin Plestina, and Adolph Ernst, all in straight falls, and all in 15 minutes or less. Then with Gotch in attendance on July 5, 1915, in Omaha, Nebraska, Stecher defeated the reigning American Heavyweight Champion, Charles Cutler to claim professional wrestling's world heavyweight championship. At just 22 years old, Joe Stecher became the youngest world champion in history up to that point, yet he remained in the vast shadow of Gotch, who had retired a couple years earlier without ever losing the title and was thus still acknowledged by the public as professional wrestling's true champion. As a result, a Gotch vs. Stecher "dream match" was arranged for July 18, 1916, and was promoted as being professional wrestling's biggest matchup since Gotch's battles with George Hackenschmidt a decade earlier. Unfortunately, the bout never materialized, as Gotch broke a fibula in his leg while wrestling Managoff as part of a traveling circus, and his health deteriorated until he eventually died on December 16, 1917.

Despite having never faced Gotch (though it is speculated that he had dominated the aging champion in an impromptu sparring session), Stecher reigned as the sport's elite star while also beginning a legendary rivalry with a new professional wrestling sensation named Ed "Strangler" Lewis. Stecher and Lewis wrestled for the first time on October 20, 1915, when a then-unknown Lewis was counted out after over two hours when he fell out of the ring and hit his head on a chair. The two then rematch on July 4, 1916, where they grappled for nearly five hours before the match was finally ruled a draw. After a third draw in 1918, Lewis had achieved notoriety by again managing to avoid being pinned by Stecher, though he was widely criticized for employing a defensive/avoiding style, while Stecher was usually the dominant aggressor. Nevertheless, it was Stecher who would win the majority of their contests over the course of the next five years.

Between championship reigns, Stecher was defeated by the 290 lb Gobar Guha on October 27, 1921, at the Convention Hall in Kansas City, in a match that lasted 1 hour and 17 minutes.

=== Retirement and post-career ===
Stecher retired for good in 1934, but later suffered an emotional breakdown and was institutionalized in the St. Cloud Veteran's Hospital in St. Cloud, Minnesota, where he remained for thirty years. In the late 1930s, Lou Thesz met Stecher during a wrestling tour in Minnesota. Thesz recalled that even after many years away from the sport Stecher still retained his elite wrestling skills. Thesz and some other wrestlers worked out with Stecher, and Stecher easily dispatched them during a sparring session. He died on March 29, 1974, at age 80.

== Championships and accomplishments ==
- George Tragos/Lou Thesz Professional Wrestling Hall of Fame
  - Class of 2000
- International Professional Wrestling Hall of Fame
  - Class of 2022
- Professional Wrestling Hall of Fame and Museum
  - Class of 2002 (Pioneer Era)
- Wrestling Observer Newsletter
  - Wrestling Observer Newsletter Hall of Fame (Class of 1996)
- Other titles
  - World Heavyweight Wrestling Championship (3 times)
