= Toots Mondt =

American professional wrestler and promoter (1894–1976)

Personal information
- Born: Joseph Raymond Mondt; January 18, 1894 Garden Grove, Iowa, U.S.
- Died: June 11, 1976 (aged 82) St. Louis, Missouri, U.S.

Professional wrestling career
- Ring name: Toots Mondt
- Billed height: 6 ft 0 in (1.83 m)
- Billed weight: 260 lb (118 kg)
- Trained by: Martin Burns
- Debut: 1912
- Retired: 1942

Joseph Raymond "Toots" Mondt (January 18, 1894 – June 11, 1976) was an American professional wrestler and promoter who revolutionized the wrestling industry in the early to mid-1920s and co-promoted the World Wide Wrestling Federation. Some of the stars Mondt helped create from the 1920s through the 1960s included Wayne Munn, Jim Londos, Antonino Rocca, Bruno Sammartino, Stu Hart and Cowboy Bill Watts.

== Early life ==
Joseph Raymond Mondt was born in Garden Grove, Iowa, on January 18, 1894. Joseph (Joe) Toots was his professional name. Toots' father, Frank, was a farmer and building contractor. The Mondt family moved to Weld County, Colorado, in 1904.

== Professional wrestling career ==
=== Early wrestling career ===
Toots Mondt made his wrestling debut in Greeley in 1912 at the age of 18 in a carnival/wrestling style match, a match he would wrestle in for many years. Stu Hart claimed he ran into Toots by chance while wrestling in New York City and that Mondt said he received his first wrestling lesson in 1916 from Jack Taylor, and Mondt tried to recruit Hart into a territory in Washington, D.C. Around this time, he also tried his hand at acrobatics. However, this was an unsuccessful move and Toots returned to wrestling matches. Toots received his big break when he was discovered by wrestling pioneer Farmer Burns during one of his scouting trips. The nickname ‘Toots’, had to do with either his small feet or his relative youth and baby face. Mondt was the youngest wrestler in Farmer Burns' camp.

=== Gold Dust Trio ===
Until 1919, wrestling matches were slow-moving exhibitions mainly confined to the mat and lasting on an average 60 minutes. Crowds no longer found this to be suitable entertainment and accordingly, they began to dwindle. Wrestling matches slowly and eventually became pre-determined. Toots Mondt joined the camp of Ed "Strangler" Lewis with the recommendation of Farmer Burns. Toots served in many capacities as a sparring partner, trainer, sometimes as an opponent and as a police officer. As a sparring partner and trainer, Toots Mondt helped Ed Lewis develop new holds and counters. The working relationship and unity amongst wrestling promoters was beginning to wear thin and crowd attendance was still low. Toots conceived a solution and combined features of a boxing ring, Greco-Roman, freestyle wrestling, and the old-time lumber camp-style of fighting. Toots had called it ’Slam Bang Western Style Wrestling’.

Toots Mondt's second plan was to promote this new style of wrestling on a much higher scale. Toots convinced Ed Lewis and his manager Billy Sandow of forming their own promotion as opposed to having different promoters controlling them. The team of Mondt, Lewis and Sandow used their connections to convince many other wrestlers to sign up. Under the control of Mondt, Lewis and Sandow, they served as bookers and agents. Toots also instituted time limits as wrestling matches would often go three or four hours. Within six months, the "Gold Dust Trio" controlled the course of professional wrestling in North America. Their product was moved out from venues such as burlesque theaters and back alley halls to the major sports venue in each city. All new talent was tested in Billy Sandow's private ring while routines and finishes were carefully determined by Toots. The Gold Dust Trio later dissolved from a power struggle between Toots Mondt & Billy Sandow's brother Max.

Mondt then formed a partnership with Philadelphia promoter, Ray Fabiani. The new combination wasted little time and found their new title holder in Dick Shikat, a former circus strongman from Germany. Once Dick Shickat's title reign had run its course, Mondt and Fabiani made Jim Londos their new champion and continued their hold on the Northeast. They soon expanded onto New York City, Hartford, Baltimore, and Washington, D.C. Toots/Fabiani were unsuccessful because rival New York promoter Jack Curley prevented them from promoting in NYC for years, and it was during this time that he came around an up-and-coming Lou Thesz, with whom Mondt had a bad history. As Jack Curley was on his deathbed, Toots realized that New York wrestling would fall apart. So Toots & Fabiani immediately formed an alliance with fellow booking heavyweight Rudy Dusek. This formation to take over New York was kept a secret. At Curley's funeral, one of his sons approached Toots about taking over New York and was not aware that Toots had a plan. Toots also gained help from other bookers such as Jack Pfeffer, the Johnston Brothers and Jess McMahon. Jess McMahon worked for boxing promoter and New York Rangers hockey franchise founder Tex Rickard, who despised wrestling and prevented bookings in Madison Square Garden (MSG) from 1939 to 1948. Toots found former wrestler turned millionaire Bernarr McFadden, who gave Toots the financial backings.

Bernarr McFadden helped Toots promote in NYC and gain access into Madison Square Garden. In 1948, in the main event of the first card held in MSG for 9 years, Gorgeous George defeated Ernie Dusek. In that same year Toots Mondt was in search for another champion. After several failed attempts, Toots Mondt found Antonino Rocca, who brought in more Latino fans to the matches which financially favored Toots. Mondt, however, was not able to keep Rocca happy and Vincent J. McMahon was brought into the scene by Ray Fabiani.

In 1954, Mondt signed up Rafael Halperin a rabbi from Israel who wrestled in a blue and white costume emblazoned with the Jewish star.

=== Birth of the World Wide Wrestling Federation ===
In 1963, Toots Mondt and Vincent J. McMahon broke away from the National Wrestling Alliance (NWA), renaming Capitol Wrestling Corporation to the World Wide Wrestling Federation (WWWF). Toots Mondt parted ways with NWA President Sam Muchnick on good terms so that the WWWF would not be seen as an enemy. Toots and Vince were also in the middle of fighting off an invasion by Jim Crockett Promotions from promoting in the WWWF territories.

When Buddy Rogers was crowned NWA World Heavyweight Champion, Toots controlled the bookings for Rogers’ title defenses. Toots would rarely allow Buddy Rogers to defend the title outside the Northeastern region. This would be one of the factors which led to the World Wide Wrestling Federation splitting from the NWA. In April 1963, Buddy Rogers was awarded the WWWF World Heavyweight title, supposedly for winning a tournament for the title in Rio de Janeiro, a fictitious storyline created by Toots Mondt. In 1965, Toots Mondt stepped down as promoter at Madison Square Garden and Vincent J. McMahon took over. When Bruno Sammartino was brought into the WWWF, Vincent J. McMahon predicted that he would be a midcarder for two or three years at best. Toots called Sammartino the future of the company because people instantly liked and responded to him. Toots convinced Vincent J. McMahon to build the company around Bruno Sammartino. In a June 2012 Wrestling Observer Radio podcast, Bruno acknowledged that Mondt and Vincent J. McMahon were not on the best of terms during his tenure with the company, with Bruno suggesting it was due to the fallout over the promotion's handling of Buddy Rogers.

Changing times and the rise of television saw Mondt's influence in the sport diminishing. Mondt was an arena booker and was never able to get a handle on television like McMahon. That fact coupled with Mondt's gambling problems allowed his business-minded partner to muscle him out of ownership of the New York territory. Toots sold off his share to McMahon in the mid-60s. McMahon reduced Mondt to salaried employee for Capitol. Mondt died on June 11, 1976, at the age of 82 after a long battle with an illness. Since then, he has been inducted into the Wrestling Observer Newsletter Hall of Fame in 1996, the Professional Wrestling Hall of Fame and Museum in 2008 and the WWE Hall of Fame in 2017 as a recipient of its Legacy Award.

== Accomplishments ==
- Professional Wrestling Hall of Fame and Museum
  - (Class of 2008)
- Wrestling Observer Newsletter
  - Wrestling Observer Newsletter Hall of Fame (1996)
- WWE

- WWE Hall of Fame (Class of 2017)
