= Jim Londos =

Greek professional wrestler (1894–1975)

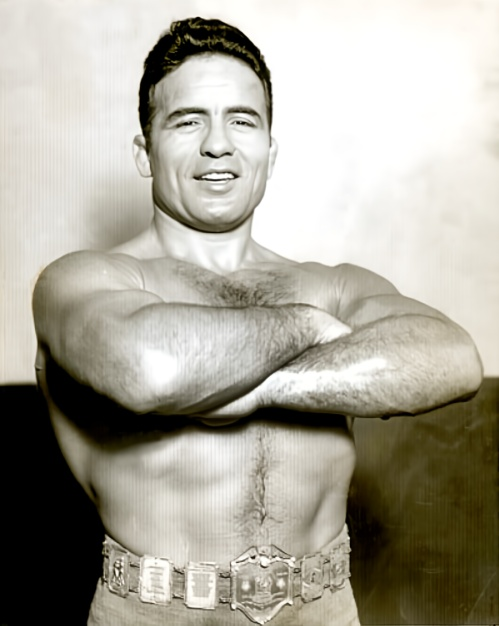
- Londos in 1931

Personal information
- Born: Christos Theofilou; January 2, 1894 Koutsopodi, Argos, Greece
- Died: August 19, 1975 (aged 81) Escondido, California, U.S.

Professional wrestling career
- Ring name: Jim Londos
- Billed height: 5 ft 8 in (1.73 m)
- Billed weight: 200 lb (91 kg)
- Debut: 1912
- Retired: 1956

Christos Theofilou (Greek: Χρήστος Θεοφίλου; January 2, 1894 – August 19, 1975), better known as "The Golden Greek" Jim Londos (Greek: Τζιμ Λόντος), was a Greek American professional wrestler. Londos was one of the most popular stars on the professional wrestling circuit from the 1920s through the 1940s and the first immigrant to be an athletic superstar in the United States.

== Early life ==
Jim Londos was born Christos Theofilou in 1894 in Koutsopodi, Argos, Greece as the youngest of thirteen children of Theophilos Theofilou and Panagoula Bimbos, though six died between the births of Londos and his next youngest brother. He worked on the family farm, tending to chores and was a middling student and not particularly outstanding young man.

At age 15, he emigrated to the United States with a cousin in search of adventure and to escape what he called his father's "stern" ways. He sailed for three weeks in steerage class aboard a steamship before landing at Ellis Island on October 10, 1909. He worked his way across the country by riding the rails. In Chicago, he shared an apartment with two friends from Greece and picked up his love of wrestling by watching amateur wrestling at a gymnasium in a resettlement complex. He also worked on a railroad in Utah before relocating to San Francisco, where his cousin lived.

== Professional wrestling career ==
In San Francisco, Londos worked a succession of odd jobs as a railroad boy, an electrician's apprentice, and a bus boy. He joined the San Francisco YMCA and quickly became one of the top amateur wrestlers on the West Coast, winning AAU and regional championships. He decided to turn pro in 1914 despite rejection from his father, who considered professional wrestling to be undignified and cut off communications with his son.

At first, Londos wrestled under his Theophelos name, as well as Young Santell and Syrian Jim Wilson. With input from an Oregon sports editor, he changed his name to Jim Londas and then Jim Londos, saying it was easier to pronounce. The disguise also hid his wrestling from his family.

Londos labored for years to break through to the top of his profession, but at 5'8", he was considered too small and too Greek to be the most important figure in wrestling. He failed in nearly a dozen tries to wrest the world title from Ed "Strangler" Lewis, Dick Shikat and Joe Stecher. During a 1928 trip to Greece, the first time he had been there in 18 years, he saw how much faith his country men and women had in him, and vowed to win the world title for them and for his father.

After a series of inter-promotional fights, Londos squared off again with Shikat for a version of the world championship on July 3, 1930, in Philadelphia under the promotion of Ray Fabiani. Londos won the match and altered the standard of a wrestling champion, defending his title 120-130 times a year before the largest crowds the sport had ever seen. Promoters ran just three shows in Madison Square Garden in the 20 months prior to Londos' championship win, averaging less than 3,200 fans. Londos immediately started selling out the Garden, drawing 20,000 against a variety of opponents. He became the greatest drawing card wrestling had ever seen.

Londos was an active and popular champion who introduced the sleeper hold into wrestling and popularized the airplane spin as a finishing move. His first reign as world champion was marked by a running Cold War feud with Lewis, though they did not wrestle between 1924 and 1934, in part because they were in opposing camps. Londos also was the victim of a double-cross in a 1933 match with Joe Savoldi that cost him his championship claim in some jurisdictions when a referee counted him down even though his shoulder was off the mat.

Londos went to Greece later that year to see his ailing father and wrestled Kola Kwariani at the Panathenaic Stadium in Athens before one of the largest crowds in sports history to that point, an estimated 70,000 inside the stadium and 20,000 on the hillside. The in-stadium attendance, buffeted by scalpers, split tickets and gate crashers, would hold until 1987 at WrestleMania III.

Londos regained near-universal recognition as world champion in 1934 when he defeated Jim Browning at the Madison Square Garden Bowl on June 25. He fought seven one-time world champions that year in a total of 25 matches, including a conclusive match against Lewis at Wrigley Field in Chicago on September 20. Londos finally pinned Lewis after years of chasing him before 35,625 fans paying more than $96,000, both North American records at the time.

After losing the title to Danno O'Mahoney in 1935, Londos took some time off for the first time in his career. For most of 1936 and 1937, he toured abroad, wrestling in Greece, Turkey, France, Eqypt and South Africa, to name a few. In his absence, wrestling faltered in North America with only four gates of 10,000 or more fans. Mainstream coverage of wrestling suffered because of the sport's shift to more gimmicky styles and a double-cross Shikat pulled on O'Mahoney in 1936, which exposed unseemly inner workings of the business to the public.

Londos regained a version of the world championship from Bronko Nagurski at Convention Hall in Philadelphia on November 11, 1938, and never lost another match; though he continued to be known as world champion, various state athletic commissions and associations simply started to recognize other champions. From 1944 to 1954, he and partner John Contos owned the Phoenix-based wrestling office. Londos wrestled there occasionally, most notably against Gorgeous George in 1949, and trained wrestlers such as Dr. Jerry Graham. He traveled to Greece a final time in September 1956 and concluded his career with a charity tour of Australia and New Zealand in 1959 where his opponents included Stan Kowalski.

Londos wrestled numerous charity matches and supported a number. His favorite charity was Greek war orphans of World War II. He was honored by both United States President Richard Nixon and King Paul of Greece for his philanthropic efforts.

Londos is considered one of the most influential wrestlers in history because of the way he injected mild showmanship into the sport and attracted record numbers of ethnic and female fans. He was an idol among Greek fans, considered the first "Golden Greek."

== Personal life and death ==
In 1939, he married Arva C. Rochwite (1912–1998), who was born in Clayton, Missouri. At the time of their marriage, Rochwite was described in press reports as a "St. Louis Aviatrix." The couple had three daughters: Diana, Demetra, and Christina. The Londos family relocated to Escondido, California, where they settled on a 10-acre site nestled in an avocado grove. There, Londos quietly managed his orchard and other investments.

Londos died of a heart attack on August 19, 1975, and is buried at Oak Hill Memorial Park in Escondido, California.

== Championships and accomplishments ==
- California State Athletic Commission
  - World Heavyweight Championship (Los Angeles version) (5 times)
- Cauliflower Alley Club
  - Posthumous Award (2020)
- George Tragos/Lou Thesz Professional Wrestling Hall of Fame
  - Class of 2015
- International Professional Wrestling Hall of Fame
  - Class of 2022
- Maryland State Athletic Commission
  - World Heavyweight Championship (Maryland version) (2 times)
- Minnesota State Athletic Commission
  - World Heavyweight Championship (Minneapolis version) (2 times)
- National Wrestling Association
  - NWA World Heavyweight Championship (1 time)
- New York State Athletic Commission
  - NYSAC World Heavyweight Championship (1 time) – unified with NWA World Heavyweight Championship
- Professional Wrestling Hall of Fame and Museum
  - Class of 2002 (Pioneer Era)
- Wrestling Observer Newsletter
  - Wrestling Observer Newsletter Hall of Fame (Class of 1996)
- WWE
  - WWE Hall of Fame (Class of 2018)
- Other championships
  - World Heavyweight Wrestling Championship (original version) (1 time)
