= Frank Gotch =

American professional wrestler (1878–1917)

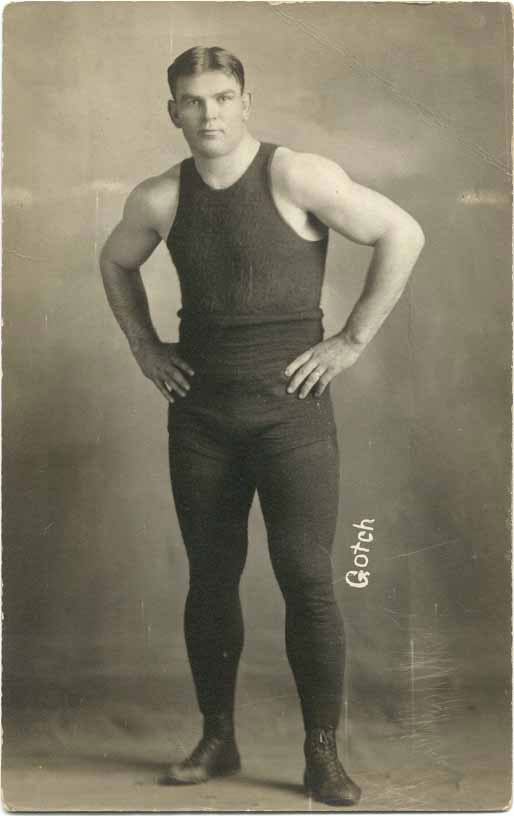

Personal information
- Born: Frank Alvin Gotch; April 27, 1877 Humboldt County, Iowa, U.S.
- Died: December 17, 1917 (aged 40) Humboldt, Iowa, U.S.
- Cause of death: Uremia poisoning
- Spouse: Gladys Oestrich (1911–1917; his death)
- Children: 1

Professional wrestling career
- Ring name(s): Frank Gotch; Frank Kennedy
- Billed height: 5 ft 11 in (1.80 m)
- Billed weight: 210 lb (95 kg)
- Trained by: Martin Burns
- Debut: 1899
- Retired: 1913

Frank Alvin Gotch (April 27, 1877 – December 17, 1917) was an American professional wrestler who was the first American to win the World Heavyweight Championship in catch wrestling, and is credited for popularizing professional wrestling in the United States. Gotch competed back when the contests at championship level were largely legit (catch wrestling), and his reign as World Heavyweight Wrestling Champion (from 1908 to 1913) is one of the ten longest in the history of professional wrestling. He became one of the most popular athletes in the United States from the 1900s to the 1910s. Pro Wrestling Illustrated described Gotch as "arguably the best North American professional wrestler of the 20th century".

== Early life and professional wrestling career ==
The son of Frederick Rudolph and Amelia Gotch, of German ancestry, he was born and raised on a small farm three miles south of Humboldt, Iowa. He took up wrestling in his teens, earning a reputation by beating locals. He adopted the toe hold as his signature finishing move. Gotch wrestled and won his first match against Marshall Green in Humboldt on April 2, 1899, but his first important match was in Lu Verne, Iowa on June 16, 1899, against a man claiming to be a furniture dealer from a neighboring town. Gotch held his own for nearly two hours, but lost the hard-fought contest. Only later when he received the impressed man's visiting card, did he learn that his opponent had actually been reigning American Heavyweight Champion Dan McLeod.

On December 18, 1899, Gotch challenged another former American Heavyweight Champion, Martin "Farmer" Burns, losing in 11 minutes but impressing Burns, who offered to train Gotch. Under the guidance of Burns, Gotch won a series of matches in Iowa and later Yukon. While in the Yukon, Gotch wrestled under the name Frank Kennedy and won the title of "Champion of the Klondike". During his time in the Yukon, Gotch tried his hand at boxing, but failed miserably against the heavyweight Frank "Paddy" Slavin.

Gotch returned to Iowa and instantly challenged the reigning American Heavyweight Champion Tom Jenkins. Gotch lost his first match in 1903, before defeating Jenkins in a rematch on January 27, 1904, to take the championship. After trading the title with Jenkins and Fred Beell, Gotch set his sights on the World Heavyweight Wrestling Championship, then held by the undefeated Estonian George Hackenschmidt. The opponent, called the "Russian Lion", had gained undisputed title recognition by defeating Jenkins in New York in 1905. Upon defeating Jenkins, Hackenschmidt ignored Gotch's challenge and sailed home to England. In 1905, Gotch beat Jack Carkeek in a Cornish wrestling match, while Jack claimed to be world Cornish wrestling champion.

== Gotch vs. Hackenschmidt ==
Gotch and Hackenschmidt finally met on April 3, 1908, at the Dexter Park Pavilion in Chicago. Showing his contempt for Gotch and for American wrestling in general, Hackenschmidt was not in the best condition, unlike Gotch, who used his speed, defense and rough tactics to wear Hackenschmidt down and then assume the attack. The wrestlers stood on their feet for two full hours before Gotch was able to get behind Hackenschmidt and take him down. While on their feet, Gotch made sure to lean on Hackenschmidt to wear him down. He bullied him around the ring, and his thumbing and butting left Hackenschmidt covered in blood. Hackenschmidt complained to the referee of Gotch's foul tactics and asked that Gotch be forced to take a hot shower to rid his body of an abundance of oil, but the referee ignored the complaints and told Hackenschmidt he should have noticed the oil before the match began. The match continued until the two-hour mark, when Hackenschmidt was forced against the ropes. Gotch tore him off the ropes, threw Hackenschmidt down and rode him hard for three minutes, working for his dreaded toe hold. Hackenschmidt had trained to avoid this hold, which he did, but the effort took his last remaining strength. Hackenschmidt quit the fall. He said, "I surrender the championship of the world to Mr. Gotch", and stood up and shook Gotch's hand. The wrestlers then retired to their dressing rooms before coming out for the second fall, but Hackenschmidt refused to return to the ring, telling the referee to declare Gotch the winner, thereby relinquishing his title to him.

Hackenschmidt said of Gotch, "He is the king of the class, the greatest man by far I ever met. After going nearly two hours with him, my muscles became stale. My feet also gave out. I had trained constantly against the toe hold and had strained the muscles of my legs. When I found myself weakening, I knew there was no use continuing and that I had no chance to win. That was the reason I conceded the championship to him. I have no desire to wrestle him again. A return match would not win back my title." Hackenschmidt later reversed his opinion of Gotch and Americans in general, claiming to have been fouled by Gotch and victimized in America, and calling for a rematch in Europe.

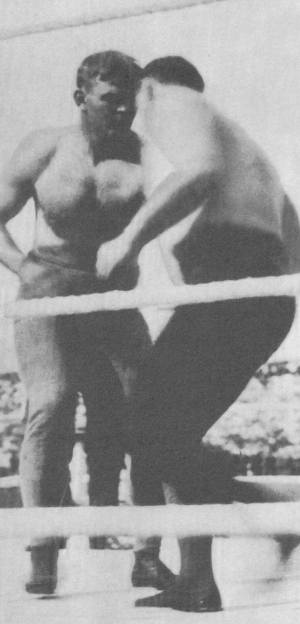
Gotch facing Georg Hackenschmidt at Comiskey Park

As undisputed free-style heavyweight champion of the world, Gotch spent the next three years establishing his dominance over the sport, defeating the likes of Jenkins, Dr. Roller, and Stanislaus Zbyszko, who was believed to have won over 900 matches before falling to Gotch on June 1, 1910. The victory over Zbyszko was particularly spectacular, as Gotch took both falls in slightly less than half an hour, and thoroughly dominated Zbyszko. He took the first fall in just six seconds with a surprise move and quick pin, and won the second fall in only 27 minutes. Gotch outmaneuvered and outclassed Zbyszko every second of the match.

Gotch became a national sensation, and he was in demand everywhere for public appearances. He starred in a play called All About A Bout, and whenever he walked on stage he was greeted by a standing ovation. He was invited to the White House by United States President Theodore Roosevelt, and wrestled a Japanese ju-jitsu expert in the East Hall, making his opponent submit. The night before his second match with Hackenschmidt, he attended a Chicago Cubs baseball game at Wrigley Field with his wife and in-laws and took his seat down front. After the game, nearly every member of the Cubs team came to his private box and asked for his autograph.

When travelling overseas with his play, Gotch was a huge hit, as it seemed that everywhere he went, fans wanted to see him. Everywhere he went, he made wrestling "big time". Gotch met Hackenschmidt again on September 4, 1911, at the newly opened Comiskey Park in Chicago, which drew a crowd of nearly 30,000 spectators and a record gate of $87,000. The rematch is one of the most controversial and talked-about matches in professional wrestling history, as Hackenschmidt injured his knee against Roller, his chief training partner. Years later, wrestler Ad Santel told Lou Thesz that he was paid $5,000 by Gotch's backers to cripple Hackenschmidt in training, and make it look like an accident.

According to Hackenschmidt himself, the injury was accidentally inflicted by his sparring partner, Dr. Roller, when trying to hold Hackenschmidt down onto his knees and Roller's right foot striking Hackenschmidt's right knee. According to Hackenschmidt, his sparring partners were Americus (Gus Schoenlein), Jacobus Koch, Wladek Zbyszko, and Dr. Roller. Ad Santel is not mentioned in any account of Hackenschmidt's training by either Hackenschmidt or Roller, both of whom offered their insights and accounts. Whatever the case may be, if the injury was real, Dr. Roller did not consider it serious and referee Ed Smith dismissed it as inconsequential. Hackenschmidt himself ignored it completely in declaring, the day before the match, that he was "fit to wrestle for my life" and was "satisfied with my condition and confident of the outcome". If there was a knee injury, Gotch discovered it quickly and took advantage of it, so Hackenschmidt was easy prey for Gotch, losing in straight falls in only 30 minutes. Gotch clinched the match with his feared toe hold, which forced Hackenschmidt to quit.

== World Heavyweight Wrestling Champion and wrestling style ==
Gotch is one of the longer reigning world champions in the history of professional wrestling, with a reign that spanned nearly five years. The only other champions to have longer reigns than Gotch are Bruno Sammartino, who held the WWF World Heavyweight Championship for a record of seven years and eight months; Lou Thesz, whose fifth NWA World Heavyweight Championship lasted seven years and seven months; and Verne Gagne, who held the AWA World Heavyweight Championship for seven years and three months. Gotch reigned as the World Heavyweight Wrestling Champion from his first victory over Hackenschmidt in 1908 until he retired in 1913 after defeating the Estonian Georg Lurich on April 1, 1913, in Kansas City, Missouri.

Gotch competed in an era when a championship wrestling match was the same as a championship prize fight: i.e., it was a major event for which the wrestlers went into training and which promoters publicized for weeks. Thus, he did not have a long career in terms of the number of matches wrestled. His mentor Farmer Burns, and later champions Ed Lewis, the "Strangler", as well as Lou Thesz, each engaged in more than 6,000 matches in their careers. Gotch engaged in only 160, finishing with a record of 154 wins and only 6 losses. Of those six losses, two were in the first year of his career – to Dan McLeod and Farmer Burns – and three were to Tom Jenkins. His last defeat was to Fred Beell on December 1, 1906, when he had crashed head-first into an uncovered turnbuckle and been rendered nearly unconscious. He defeated Beell in seven rematches and never lost again by the time of his retirement in 1913. Gotch was, by all accounts, a superior professional wrestler possessing tremendous strength, lightning quickness, genuine agility, cat-like reflexes, impeccable technique, superb ring generalship, a mastery of the use of leverage, and a full knowledge of professional wrestling holds, counterholds and strategy. He was always in the best of condition and possessed both enormous courage and an indomitable will to win, ever ready to match his heart, his gameness, against any man in the world. He was highly aggressive, but always kept his cool. Critics saw in him both the strength of the old school of professional wrestling and the skill of the new, "as agile as a cat in his manoeuvers" and having "the grappling sport down to such science that he had assumed a rank all by himself".

Gotch's measurements for his 1911 victory over Hackenschmidt were as follows: age – 33; weight – 204 pounds; height – 5'11"; reach – 73"; biceps – 17.5"; forearm – 14"; neck – 18"; chest – 45"; waist – 34"; thigh – 22"; calf – 18". There is another side to this story that, when Thesz was just starting out in the early 1930s, there were a good many professional wrestlers still active who had known Gotch and were not reluctant to talk about him. "The picture that emerged of Gotch from those conversations", Thesz recalled, "was of a man who succeeded at his business primarily because he was, for lack of a kinder description, a dirty wrestler. That's not to say that he wasn't competent, because everyone I ever talked with said he was one of the best. But those same people described him as someone who delighted in hurting or torturing lesser opponents, even when they were supposed to be working out, and he was always looking for an illegal edge when he was matched against worthy ones. One of the old-timers I met was a fine man named Charlie Cutler, who knew Gotch very well and succeeded him as world champion; according to Cutler, Gotch would check the oil, pull hair and even break a bone to get an advantage in a contest, and he was unusually careful to have the referee in his pocket, too, in case all else failed".

Referee Ed Smith, who officiated several of Gotch's bouts, including both of the Gotch-Hackenschmidt contests, had observed after the second match that "to my mind... he wasn't just exactly through one hundred percent on the courageous side. Two or three times I saw needless acts of absolute cruelty on his part that I did not like. Always will I think that the really courageous man, no matter how ferocious and filled with the killing instinct and eager to win he may be, is willing to let up on a beaten foe and not punish needlessly or wantonly".

== Marriage, retirement, and death ==
For years one of the most eligible bachelors in the United States, Gotch married Gladys Oestrich (born 1891) on February 11, 1911. She died on October 15, 1930. They had one son, Frank Robert Gotch (February 24, 1914 – December 7, 1971). While in retirement, Gotch joined Sells-Floto Circus where he would pay any man $250.00 if they could last 15 minutes in a match against him without being pinned or conceding. Not once did he have to pay. He grew tired of touring and moved back to Humboldt. After a year of health troubles, Gotch died at home in 1917. He left behind his wife Gladys and their son, Frank Robert. All are entombed together in the Gotch mausoleum in the Union Cemetery in Humboldt. The official cause of death was uremic poisoning.

== Legacy ==
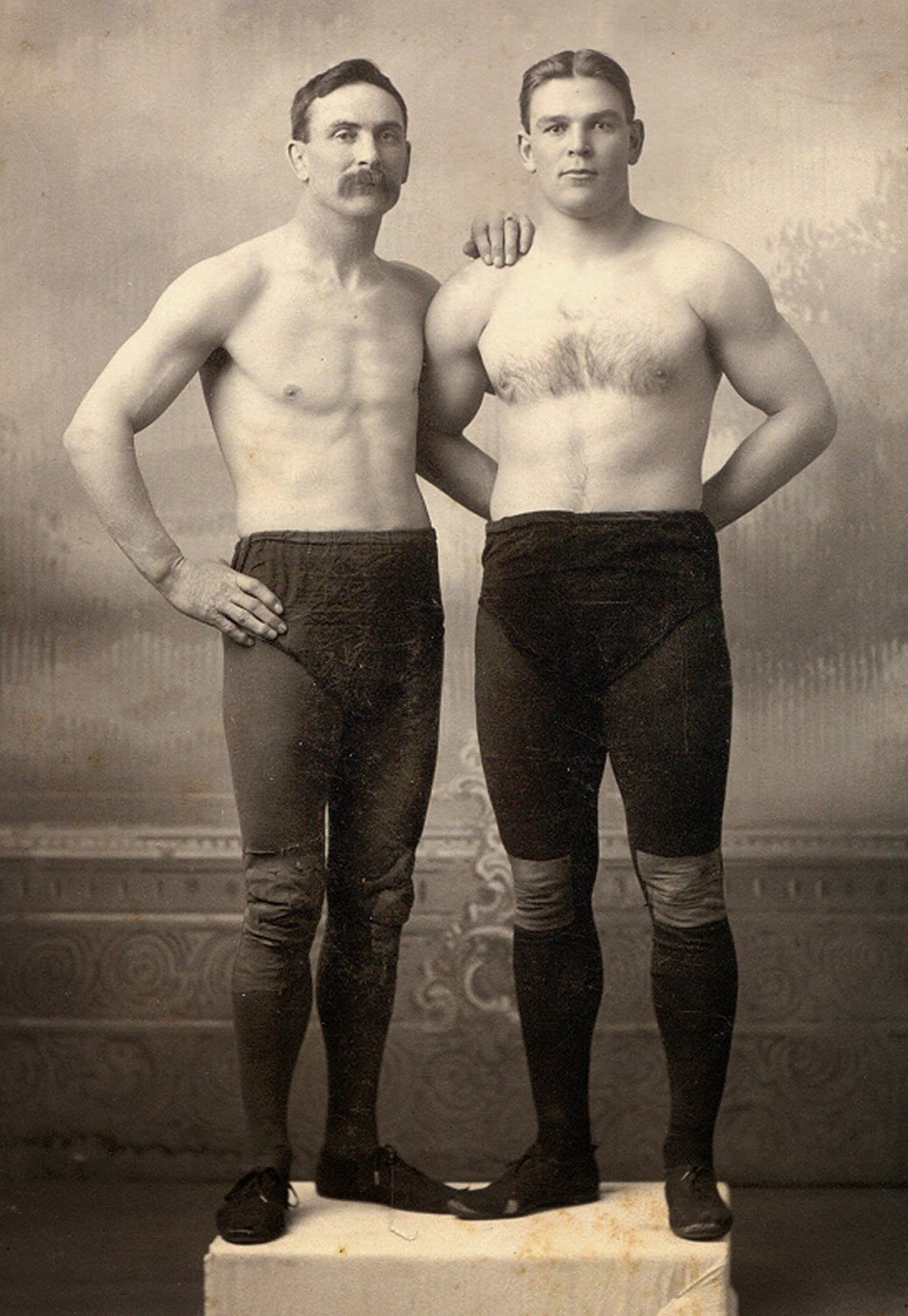
Gotch (right) with mentor Martin Burns

In 1936, Nat Fleischer wrote of Gotch, "The story of American Wrestling at its greatest is the story of the career of its most illustrious champion—Frank Gotch ... Gotch was to wrestling history in this country what John L. Sullivan was to boxing. He dominated the field. Through his extraordinary ability, he gained for wrestling many converts and brought the sport into such favor that it became as big in the promotorial field as boxing." As Mark Palmer observed, "For starters, George Hackenschmidt and Frank Gotch were major sports superstars of the early 20th century. Fans of all ages collected cabinet cards and postcards with their images, read their books, and devoured articles about them in newspapers. Their epic matches were front-page news around the world—akin to today's Super Bowl or soccer's World Cup in terms of garnering global attention—and helped to launch organized amateur wrestling in the United States in the early part of the 20th century. In fact, a large number of high school and college wrestling programs can trace their roots back to the 1910s and 1920s—the era when Hackenschmidt and Gotch were still household names, and highly respected athletes."

Gotch was a major sports superstar, often called the Hulk Hogan of his day, who lifted professional wrestling to new heights of popularity. When he became world champion, there were not many sports competing with wrestling for public attention. Horse racing remained a favorite sport and major league baseball was growing in popularity, but was not yet the national pastime. Automobile racing was in its infancy; golf was still the province of the wealthy; basketball had just been invented and was vying for attention; boxing offered a man a chance at fame and fortune, but was at this time riddled with scandals; the National Hockey League was formed the same year; and college football—the Ivy League game—was on the verge of being outlawed because it was too rough and too dangerous. Americans already dominated boxing and within a decade would begin to dominate golf. When Gotch defeated Hackenschmidt, the domination of professional wrestling passed to the Americans. In addition, many matches had still been conducted under Greco-Roman wrestling rules, but this match caused Greco-Roman to be forever replaced by the more exciting catch-as-catch-can style.

Gotch achieved a level of popularity similar to that formerly held by boxer John L. Sullivan and harness racehorse Dan Patch, and enjoyed later by such sports heroes of the Golden Age of Sports as boxing's Jack Dempsey, baseball's Babe Ruth, tennis's Bill Tilden and golf's Bobby Jones. This in turn made professional wrestling mainstream. Mac Davis wrote in 100 Greatest Sports Heroes, "As the idol of millions in the United States, Canada and Mexico, Gotch made [professional] wrestling a big-time sport in his day. He drew larger audiences than did the heavyweight champion of boxing when defending his title." Gotch's first match against Hackenschmidt also remains perhaps the most famous professional wrestling encounter of all time.

=== Honors and tributes ===
Gotch was among the first elected to the Iowa Sports Hall of Fame (1951), and was the first inductee to both the Professional Wrestling Hall of Fame and Museum (2002) in Amsterdam, New York, and the George Tragos & Lou Thesz Pro Wrestling Hall of Fame (1999) in Waterloo, Iowa. There is a 67-acre camping park named the Frank A. Gotch State Park, four miles south of Humboldt near his childhood farm, in homage to Gotch. The Humboldt Community School District sponsors the annual Frank Gotch Wrestling Tournament. Because of Gotch's legacy, Iowa remains a wrestling stronghold at the high school and collegiate levels to this day. Gotch's success and fame is credited with playing a part in the creation of the Iowa High School Wrestling Tournament in 1921.

The 1957 musical The Music Man mentions the exciting contest between Gotch and Strangler Ed Lewis, whose nickname is mispronounced as "Strangular" by River City Mayor Shinn in one of many malapropisms throughout the show. On July 4, 2012, an eight-foot tall bronze statue of Gotch was unveiled in Bicknell Park in Humboldt, the site of his outdoor training camp where as many as 1,000 people watched him train before his second Hackenschmidt match. In December 2011, a street running along the park was renamed Frank Gotch Boulevard.

There is an extensive Gotch collection in the Dan Gable Wrestling Museum in Waterloo, Iowa. On display are the wrestling shoes he wore into the ring in 1911 against Hackenschmidt, his Mason's sword and leather scabbard, the roll-top desk that sat in his living room in Humboldt, and many other rare items. In addition, an independent film company acquired the rights to the book Gotch: An American Hero in 2008, a biography written by Mike Chapman published in 1999, and is listed as "in pre-production" on its official website, yet still did not appear on the film company's IMDb credits page as in production as of April 2015.

In February 2015, WHO-DT of Des Moines aired Iowa Icon: Gotch Up There with Feller, Warner, Gable with quotes from University of Iowa wrestling coach Tom Brands, among others, with the five-minute feature's title recognizing Gotch as one of Iowa's sports icons alongside Bob Feller, Kurt Warner, and college wrestling legend Dan Gable. The video and story is archived on its website. Karl Gotch and Simon Gotch both took their professional wrestling names as a tribute to him. On April 2, 2016, Gotch was inducted into the WWE Hall of Fame as a Legacy member.

=== Frank Gotch World Catch Championships ===
With the revival of catch wrestling, tournaments have been held in Gotch's name at his home town. The inaugural Frank Gotch World Catch Championships took place in Humboldt on July 3, 2016, with over 250 spectators. Roy Wood, head coach at The Snake Pit in England, was an honored guest at the event and led a catch wrestling seminar on July 2. At the tournament, the champions were Chris Morales (220+ lbs), Travis Wiuff (200–219 lbs), Anthony Pachek (160–179 lbs), Matt Tran (140–159 lbs), and Shayna Baszler (women's openweight division), and there was a catchweight match with Curran Jacobs pinning Travis Warner.

The Frank Gotch World Catch Championships took place in Humboldt again on July 15, 2017. This edition used a single division openweight format. Curran Jacobs won the tournament despite a 60 lbs weight disadvantage to Travis Wiuff in the final, beating him with a Gotch toe hold, and Anthony Pachek placed third.

== Championships and accomplishments ==
=== Catch wrestling ===
- American Catch-as-Catch-can Championship (1 time)
- World Catch-as-Catch-Can Championship (1 time)

=== Professional wrestling ===
- American Heavyweight Wrestling Championship (3 times)
- Champion of the Klondike
- World Heavyweight Wrestling Championship (1 time)
- George Tragos/Lou Thesz Professional Wrestling Hall of Fame
  - Class of 1999
- International Professional Wrestling Hall of Fame
  - Class of 2021
- Professional Wrestling Hall of Fame and Museum
  - Class of 2002
- Wrestling Observer Newsletter
  - Wrestling Observer Newsletter Hall of Fame (Class of 1996)
- WWE
  - WWE Hall of Fame (Class of 2016)
- Iowa Sports Hall of Fame
  - Class of 1951

== See also ==
- List of premature professional wrestling deaths
