= Cinema of Wales =

The cinema of Wales comprises the art of film and creative movies made in Wales or by Welsh filmmakers either locally or abroad. Welsh cinema began in the late-19th century, led by Welsh-based director William Haggar. Wales continued to produce film of varying quality throughout the 20th century, in both the Welsh and English languages, though indigenous production was curtailed through a lack of infrastructure and finance, which prevented the growth of the industry nationally. Despite this, Wales has been represented in all fields of the film-making process, producing actors and directors of note.

== History ==
=== Origins and early history ===
Wales has a long film-making history, with the first films shot in 1896, just a year after the development of the Lumières' cinematographe. The first known film to be recorded in Wales was by American Birt Acres featuring a royal visit to Cardiff by the Prince of Wales, later Edward VII. The film was later shown at the Great Fine Art, Industrial and Maritime Exhibition in Cardiff's Cathays Park in June 1896. Indigenous film production began in 1898, when Rhyl based Arthur Cheetham began recording silent 'short' films of local events. His first film was shown in January 1898 of children playing on Rhyl sands.

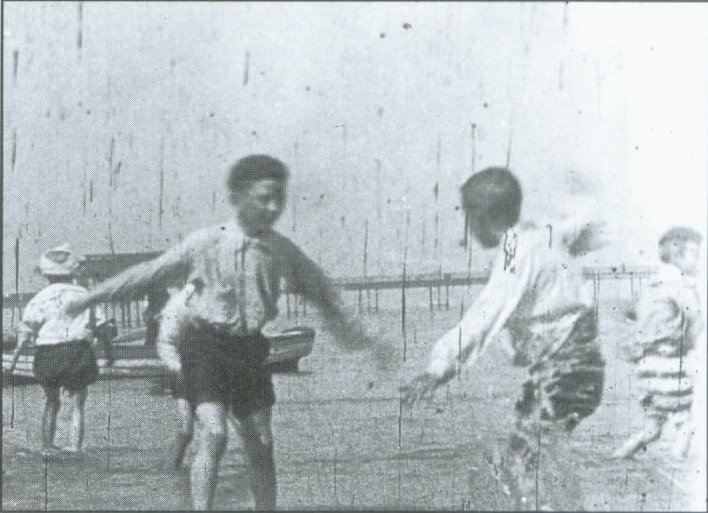
Still from children playing on Rhyl Sands (1898)

The first Wales-based film-maker of enduring stature was William Haggar, who made over 30 fiction films between 1901 and 1908. Haggar's work received a worldwide audience mainly through the Gaumont and Urban companies. Haggar's most notable film was Desperate Poaching Affray (1903) which is recognised for its violence, iconoclasm and progressive editing. The film, along with Frank Mottorshaw's A Daring Daylight Burglary and Edwin Stanton Porter's The Great Train Robbery, has in the early Twenty-first century, been credited with influencing the chase subgenre of American films.

Other extant pre–Great War films to be shot in Wales were made by film-makers from outside the country. These included the British Biograph Company's film Conway Castle (1898) and Charles Urban Company's Wales, England: Land of Castles and Waterfalls (1907). The 1906 British Home Championship encounter between Wales and Ireland at Wrexham was filmed by Blackburn firm Mitchell and Keynon, and is now the oldest surviving film of an international football match. While the oldest footage of any football match is the 1898 film by Arthur Cheetham, Blackburn Rovers v West Bromwich Albion.

During the first few decades of Welsh cinema, Wales was at the height of an industrial revolution, but there is little sense of the industrial landscape or life captured in the early silent movies taken within the country. Visiting companies, such as Edison and British and Colonial tended to favour filming in rural Wales.

=== 1914 to 1980 ===
Much of the cinema of Wales in the later 1910s and 1920s has been lost. In 1920 nine films were shot in Wales, all now lost. One of the most notable and celebrated of the films from this period is A Welsh Singer (1915), adapted from a work by Welsh writer Allen Raine, which starred Florence Turner. Henry Edwards who directed A Welsh Singer, also created the 1930 film Aylwin, from the novel by Theodore Watts-Dunton, drawing into the world of gypsies and a mythical, mystical Wales. The 1930s saw the first Welsh language film, Y Chwarelwr directed by Ifan ab Owen Edwards in 1935. The decade also saw two important agitprop documentaries, Today We Live (1937) set among the unemployed miners of the village of Pentre in the Rhondda Valleys, and Donald Alexander's Eastern Valley (1937). The outbreak of World War II saw the backdrop of a mining valley in Wales being used as the setting for a war propaganda film, The Silent Village (1943). Designed as a tribute to the mining community of Lidice, Czechoslovakia, which had suffered from Nazi atrocities, The Silent Village transpose the events to a Wales; and was also used to draw analogies with the oppression of the Welsh language.

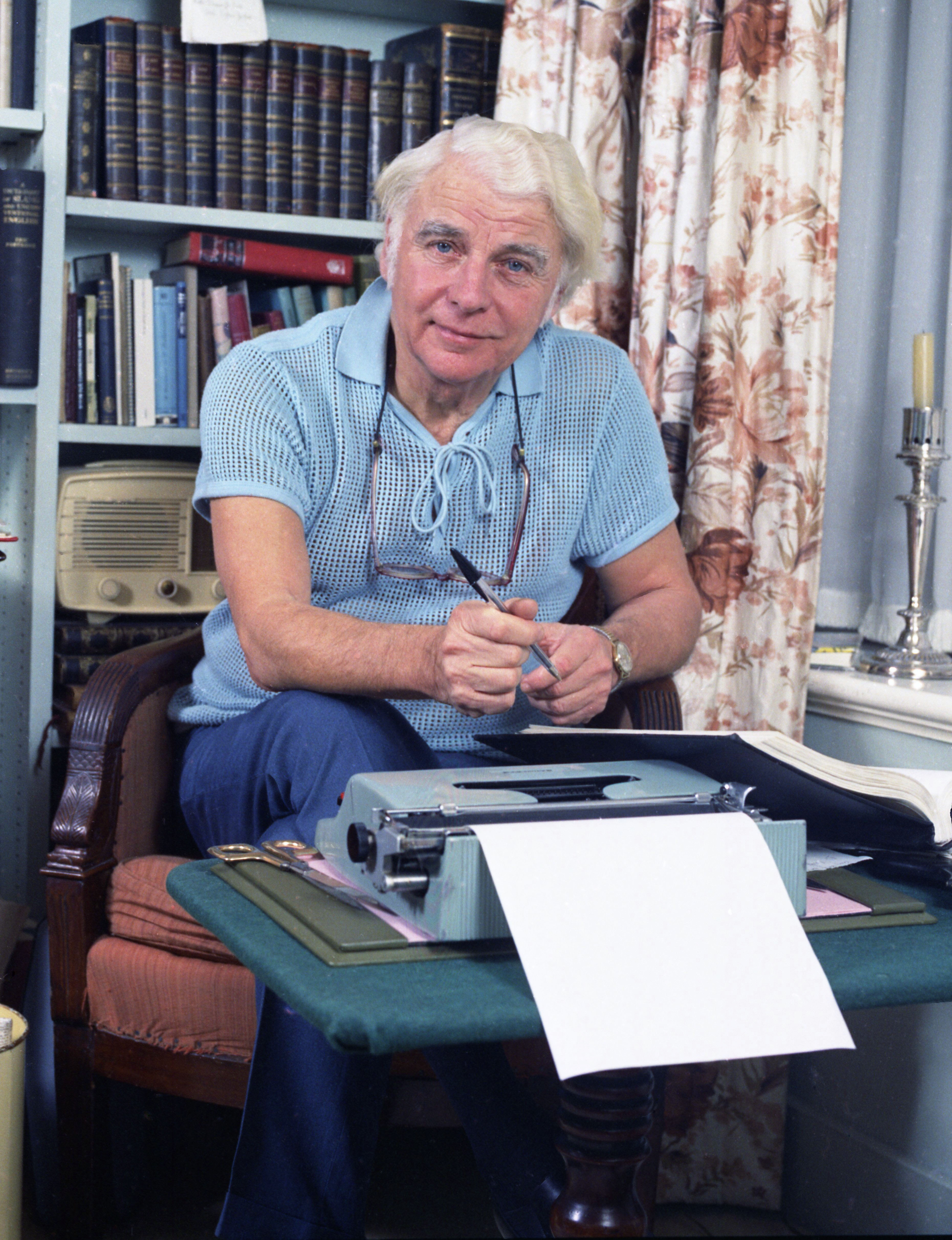
Welsh dramatist and director of The Last Days of Dolwyn, Emlyn Williams

The coming of the sound era had little impact on Welsh cinema, though 1938's The Citadel an adaptation of A. J. Cronin's 1937 novel brought Wales to a large audience; though King Vidor's interpretation failed to express the novel's political message. The first Hollywood 'talkie' to be set in Wales was James Whale's The Old Dark House. The best known films connected to Wales during this period failed to harness Welsh talents, The Proud Valley (1940) and How Green Was My Valley (1940) were neither directed or adapted for the screen by Welsh people. John Ford's How Green Was My Valley is notable for starring just one Welsh actor, Rhys Williams, and for being shot in the United States. Although John Ford's view of Wales was based on a mythical and romantic view of the industrialised valleys, Jill Craigie’s Blue Scar (1949), part financed by the National Coal Board, raised serious and radical questions about the nationalisation of the coal industry and has striking location photography around south Wales. Another release from 1949 to make an important cultural statement was Emlyn Williams' The Last Days of Dolwyn, the plot of which centred on the flooding of a Welsh village to create a reservoir; a subject that became extremely controversial in Wales in the 1960s.

The 1950s and 1960s saw the output of two of the country's best documentary makers. Jack Howells and John Ormond dealt primarily with Welsh people and subjects. Howells is best known for his impressionistic, lyrical documentaries that included Nye! (1965) and Dylan Thomas (1962). Dylan Thomas is the only Welsh film to have won an Oscar (for best short documentary), it features Richard Burton as narrator, visiting the haunts of Dylan Thomas. Ormond, a poet foremost, is remembered for his sensitive portrayals of writers and authors, and for documentaries concerned with the working class and with refugees, in particular Borrowed Pasture (1960) which follows two Polish ex-soldiers struggling to get by on a Carmarthenshire smallholding.

The period directly following the end of the Second World War saw political and social commentary disappear from Welsh cinema. The first few decades after the war saw few notable Welsh films; stand out exceptions included Tiger Bay (1959) and Only Two Can Play (1962). The main problems facing Welsh cinema during this period were a lack of a film production infrastructure, Welsh producers and finance. The fact that Wales was unable to produce films from within its own borders resulted in the stereotyping and common preconceptions of Welsh life formed by 'outside' film-makers. One of the few beacons of light for the industry came in the late 1970s with the output of left wing producer and director Karl Francis; whose controversial portrayal of contemporary life in the south Wales valleys was typified by his 1976 film Above us the Earth. Welsh language films were few, notably the films produced in the 1970s by the Bwrdd Ffilmiau Cymraeg (Welsh Film Board).

Before the advent of a dedicated channel, BBC Wales and its commercial counterpart HTV produced Welsh language programmes for their viewers in Wales. Although this did not include the creation of feature-length films, in the 1970s HTV undertook a venture to dub existing movies into Welsh. Their first attempt was George Stevens' 1953 Western, Shane. The result was seen as unintentionally humorous and the experiment was quickly abandoned.

=== 1980 to 1999 ===
1982 saw the launch of S4C, a Welsh language television channel, which began producing and funding longer dramas and films in the Welsh and English language. Initial output was poor, but after reassessing its responsibilities in 1986, the company produced films of note, including Boy Soldier (1986) and Rhosyn a Rhith (1986), the latter being the first film in the Welsh language to gain a London West End cinema release. Although the production of Welsh features from S4C was low, it aided the emergence of talented Welsh film-makers, such as Endaf Emlyn, Marc Evans and Stephen Bayly. S4C's 1995 policy, to produce up to two feature films a year, to be released to cinemas before television transmission allowed Welsh film-makers new opportunities. Yet the reluctance of London-based distributors to handle Welsh language films make it difficult for Welsh films to reach a wider audience.

The early 1990s began with the release of Welsh language film Hedd Wyn. It won the Royal Television Society Best Drama award and became the first Welsh film to gain a nomination in the Academy Award for Best Foreign Language Film. Despite this it failed to gain a British distributor. The 1990s also saw two important films from Endaf Emlyn, Un Nos Ola Leuad (1991) is seen as one of the finest Welsh films made, while his Gadael Lenin (1993) was voted by viewers at the 1993 London Film Festival as the most popular British film.

The later 1990s saw three English language films that found a home in mainstream British cinema. The first of the three was Marc Evans' House of America which drew comparisons to the realism of Karl Francis' work. Then in 1997, Kevin Allen produced Twin Town, a bawdy comedy satirising the older cultural traditions of Wales. This though was surpassed at the box office by Justin Kerrigan's Human Traffic (1999), a stylised comedy focusing on the club and drug culture of Cardiff.

=== 2000 to present ===
2000 saw the release of Paul Morrison's Solomon & Gaenor, the second film to be nominated for the foreign language Academy Award.

Films of note in the early twenty-first century set in Wales include comedies House! (2000) and Very Annie Mary (2000), and horror films The Dark (2005) and Evil Aliens (2006). In 2009 a biopic of the early relationship between Welsh poet Dylan Thomas and his wife Caitlin Macnamara was released entitled The Edge of Love.

== Film production and development ==
Despite an improvement in film production in Wales, finance is still an issue, with very few films being created without external funding. House of America took its funding from six different sources while multinationals funded both Twin Town (PolyGram) and The Englishman Who Went Up a Hill But Came Down a Mountain (Miramax).

Ffilm Cymru Wales is the development agency for Welsh film. It provides funding and training to emerging and established Welsh filmmakers, as well as hosting events that showcase Welsh films.

BAFTA Cymru, established in 1987, is the Welsh branch of the British Academy of Film and Television Arts. Bafta Cymru has held an annual awards ceremony since 1991 to recognise achievements in Welsh cinema.

== Animation ==
Prior to the formation of S4C in 1982, there was very little work produced in the field of animation in Wales. The one notable exception being Sid Griffiths' Jerry the Tyke (1925-1927), a mischievous dog who was used for Pathé cinema news magazines. Production increased after 1982, with S4C producing the popular children's animation SuperTed made by Siriol Productions. Siriol eventually branched into making feature length animations, including an adaptation of Dylan Thomas' Under Milk Wood (1992) and a joint venture with Hungarian company PannóniaFilm, The Princess and the Goblin (1992).

The opportunities afforded by S4C's animation unit encouraged an influx of talented British artists into Wales. The best known of this group of animators was Joanna Quinn, who gained an Oscar nomination in 1998 for Famous Fred and another in 2021 for Affairs of the Art. Quinn also produced one of the segments of The Canterbury Tales, which was Oscar nominated in 1999.

== Welsh film directors ==
Wales has produced film directors of quality throughout its history, though those that have found success have more often needed to leave Wales to gain recognition. Although based in Wales neither Cheetham or Haggar were Welsh born, similar for Sidney Northcote who in 1912 produced a number of short films shot on location in Wales and Cornwall, based on Welsh and Cornish myths and tales, including The Pedlar of Penmaenmawr, The Witch of the Welsh Mountains and The Belle of Bettwys-y-Coed.

Welsh-born directors who have gained international recognition include Richard Marquand, (Return of the Jedi), Peter Greenaway (Drowning by Numbers) and Terry Jones (Erik the Viking). Two of the more notable directors from Wales who have retained a strong connection with the culture of Wales are Karl Francis, who for two decades was the most powerful, distinctive and combative voice in Welsh film-making; and Stephen Weeks whose commercial features look back to a medieval or imperialist past, or a misty Celtic world. Francis' work is embedded in a realistic exploration of Wales, its language and identity, in films such as Milwr Bychan (Boy Soldier) and The Mouse and the Women. Weeks came to prominence after directing I, Monster, an adaptation of Dr. Jekyll and Mr. Hyde starring Christopher Lee and Peter Cushing. Weeks would later film two versions of the Arthurian myth of Gawain and the Green Knight. First as Gawain and the Green Knight (1973) featuring Murray Head in the lead role and again as Sword of the Valiant in 1984.

Later Welsh directors, such as Sara Sugarman and Marc Evans made films set in Wales. Welsh director Gareth Evans lived from 2009 to 2015 in Indonesia, where he made such action movies as The Raid.

== Welsh movie actors ==
Wales has a long tradition of producing film-actors who have made an impact on the world stage. During the silent period Welsh actors of note included Ivor Novello, who came to prominence through cinema after starring in The Lodger (1927) and Downhill (1927); Gareth Hughes, often cast as a youthful charmer, gained excellent notices for the now-lost Sentimental Tommy (1921) and Lyn Harding, whose stature and presence made him a sought after villain playing Moriarty in several early Sherlock Holmes films.

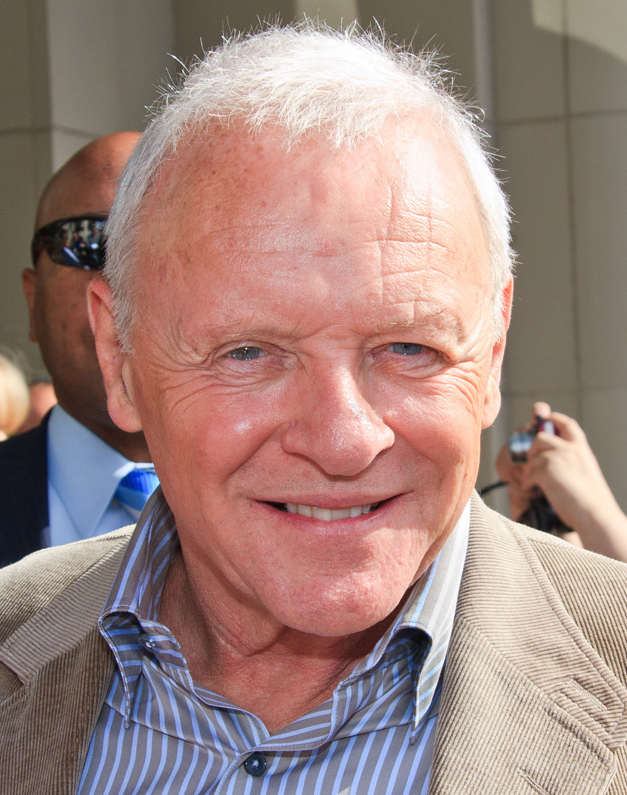
Welsh actor, Anthony Hopkins

The 1940s saw Rhondda's Donald Houston breakthrough in his first two features The Blue Lagoon (1949) and A Run for Your Money (1949). In 1945 Ray Milland became the first Welsh actor to win the Academy Award for Best Actor, for his role as an alcoholic writer in The Lost Weekend.

The most significant period for Welsh actors came during the 1950s and 1960s. A new wave of realism entered British acting, and at the forefront came Welsh actors Richard Burton, Stanley Baker and Rachel Roberts. The period also saw Welsh character actors such as Hugh Griffith, who won the Best Supporting Actor Academy Award for his role in the 1959 version of Ben Hur.

Another famous Welsh actor is Timothy Dalton who portrayed famous secret agent James Bond twice at the end of the eighties.

The most distinctive Welsh actor of the 1990s through to the 2000s was Anthony Hopkins. Hopkins has appeared in film since the 1960s, starring in Hollywood costume dramas such as The Lion in Winter. Starring in films as diverse as Richard Attenborough's Magic and David Lynch's The Elephant Man, Hopkins became a Hollywood star after his Academy Award-winning performance as Hannibal Lecter in The Silence of the Lambs (1992). Hopkins continued to impress throughout the 1990s with critically acclaimed performances in Shadowlands and Remains of the Day.

The 1990s produced an abrasive group of Welsh actors, including Rhys Ifans and Matthew Rhys. The 1990s also saw the success of Catherine Zeta-Jones, who became one of Hollywood's highest paid stars, appearing alongside Antonio Banderas and Anthony Hopkins in The Mask of Zorro and won the Academy Award for Best Supporting Actress for Chicago. The 2000s are most notable for the emergence of Ioan Gruffudd, who took the lead role in the 2006 historical drama Amazing Grace, and Michael Sheen who appeared as Tony Blair in Peter Morgan's Blair Trilogy and played David Frost in Frost/Nixon.

== See also ==
- List of Academy Award winners and nominees from Great Britain
- List of Welsh films
- List of cinema industries by location
  - Cinema of Europe
    - Cinema of the United Kingdom
- Wales One World Film Festival

== Bibliography ==
- Davies, John; Jenkins, Nigel; Menna, Baines; Lynch, Peredur I., eds. (2008). The Welsh Academy Encyclopaedia of Wales. Cardiff: University of Wales Press. ISBN 978-0-7083-1953-6.
- Berry, David (1996). Wales and Cinema, The First Hundred Years. Cardiff: University of Wales Press. ISBN 0-7083-1370-1.
