= Goodenia drummondii =

Scientific classification
- Kingdom: Plantae
- Clade: Tracheophytes
- Clade: Angiosperms
- Clade: Eudicots
- Clade: Asterids
- Order: Asterales
- Family: Goodeniaceae
- Genus: Goodenia
- Species: G. drummondii

Binomial name
- Goodenia drummondii Carolin

Species of plant

Goodenia drummondii is a species of flowering plant in the family Goodeniaceae and is endemic to the south-west of Western Australia. It is an erect shrub with linear to lance-shaped stem leaves, and spike-like thyrses of small white flowers with purplish spots.

== Description ==
Goodenia drummondii is an erect, glabrous shrub that typically grows to a height of 0.3–1 m (1 ft 0 in – 3 ft 3 in). The leaves are mostly arranged on the stem, linear to lance-shaped with the narrower end towards the base, 10–40 mm (0.39–1.57 in) long and 1–4 mm (0.039–0.157 in) wide, sometimes with teeth on the edges. The flowers are arranged in spike-like thyrses up to 200 mm (7.9 in) long with triangular bracts 1–2 mm (0.039–0.079 in) long at the base. The sepals are narrow egg-shaped to linear, 1–1.5 mm (0.039–0.059 in) long, the corolla white with purplish spots, about 6 mm (0.24 in) long. The lower lobes of the corolla are about 2.5 mm (0.098 in) long with wings 0.3–0.4 mm (0.012–0.016 in) wide. Flowering occurs from September to January and the fruit is a more or less spherical capsule about 1 mm (0.039 in) in diameter.

== Taxonomy and naming ==
Goodenia drummondii was first formally described in 1990 by Roger Charles Carolin in the journal Telopea from material collected by James Drummond.

In 1998, Leigh William Sage described two subspecies of G. drummondii in the journal Nuytsia, and the names are accepted by the Australian Plant Census:

- Goodenia drummondii Carolin subsp. drummondii has leaves up to 40 mm (1.6 in) long with toothed edges and a flowering spike up to 200 mm (7.9 in) long;
- Goodenia drummondii subsp. megaphyllaL.W.Sage has leaves up to 78 mm (3.1 in) long with smooth edges and a flowering spike up to 440 mm (17 in) long.

The specific epithet (drummondii) honours James Drummond and the epithet megaphylla means "large-leaved".

== Distribution and habitat ==
This goodenia grows in woodland and heath on sandy soils from Kalbarri National Park to Latham in the south-west of Western Australia, but subspecies megaphylla mostly grows near granite outcrops and is restricted to an area between Armadale, Boyagin and Northam.

== Conservation status ==
Goodenia drummondii and both its subspecies are classified as "not threatened" by the Government of Western Australia Department of Parks and Wildlife.
