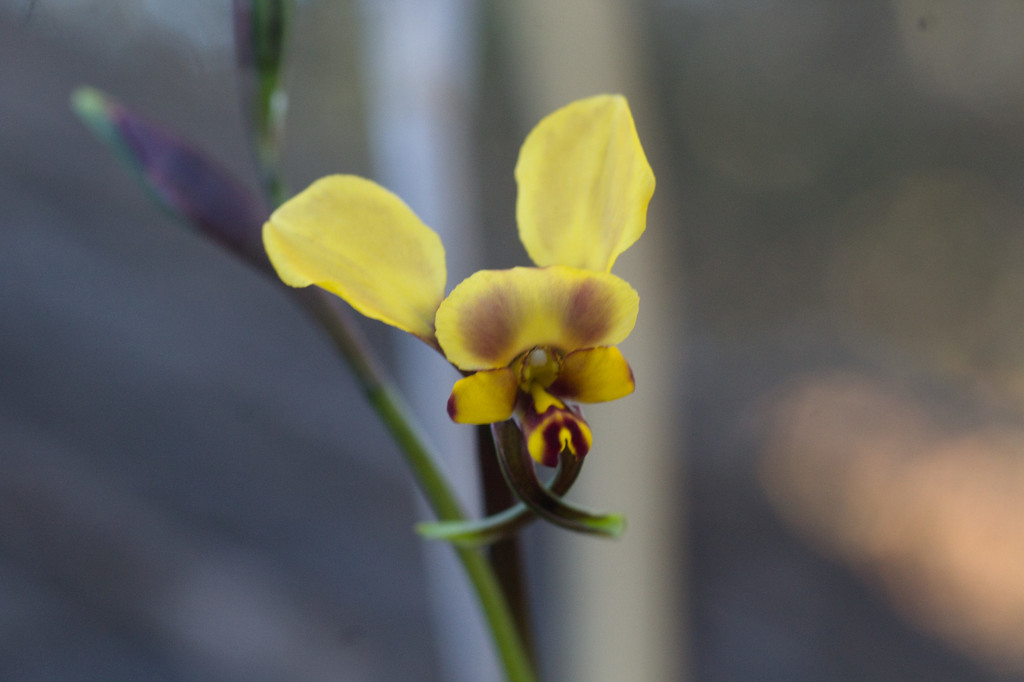
- Near Latham

Scientific classification
- Kingdom: Plantae
- Clade: Embryophytes
- Clade: Tracheophytes
- Clade: Angiosperms
- Clade: Monocots
- Order: Asparagales
- Family: Orchidaceae
- Subfamily: Orchidoideae
- Tribe: Diurideae
- Genus: Diuris
- Species: D. pallescens

Binomial name
- Diuris pallescens D.L.Jones & C.J.French

= Diuris pallescens =

Species of orchid

Diuris pallescens, commonly known as pale donkey orchid, is a species of orchid that is endemic to the south-west of Western Australia. It has two or three linear to lance-shaped leaves and up to seven pale yellow flowers with light brown to reddish-brown markings.

== Description ==
Diuris pallescens is a tuberous, perennial herb with two or three linear to lance-shaped leaves 150–300 mm (5.9–11.8 in) long and 4–7 mm (0.16–0.28 in) wide. Up to seven pale yellow flowers with light brown to reddish-brown markings, 25–30 mm (0.98–1.18 in) long and 10–15 mm (0.39–0.59 in) wide are borne on a flowering stem 150–350 mm (5.9–13.8 in) tall. The dorsal sepal is egg-shaped, 6–8 mm (0.24–0.31 in) long and 7–9 mm (0.28–0.35 in) wide, the lateral sepals narrowly oblong, down-turned and crossed, 10–14 mm (0.39–0.55 in) long and 2–3 mm (0.079–0.118 in) wide. The petals are broadly elliptic to more or less round, 8–14 mm (0.31–0.55 in) long and 5–8 mm (0.20–0.31 in) wide on a stalk 3.0–4.5 mm (0.12–0.18 in) long. The labellum is 5–7 mm (0.20–0.28 in) long with three lobes - the centre lobe wedge-shaped, 5–6 mm (0.20–0.24 in) long and 6–7 mm (0.24–0.28 in) wide, the side lobes spread widely apart and oblong, 4–7 mm (0.16–0.28 in) long and 3–4 mm (0.12–0.16 in) wide. There is a single smooth, yellow callus ridge 3–4 mm (0.12–0.16 in) long, along the mid-line of the labellum. Flowering occurs from late August to mid-September.

== Taxonomy and naming ==
Diuris pallescens was first formally described in 2016 by David Jones and Christopher J. French in Australian Orchid Review, from a specimen collected by French in the Caron Nature Reserve near Perenjori in 2005. The specific epithet (pallescens) means "pale", "wan" or "becoming paler", referring to the colour of the flowers.

== Distribution and habitat ==
Pale donkey orchid grows in low, heathy shrubland, often near granite outcrops, mainly in the area between Three Springs, Coorow and Dalwallinu in the Avon Wheatbelt, Coolgardie, Geraldton Sandplains and Mallee bioregions of south-western Western Australia.

== Conservation ==
Diuris pallescens is listed as "not threatened" by the Western Australian Government Department of Biodiversity, Conservation and Attractions.
