= Henry Jasper Redfern =

British photographer and filmmaker

- Born: Henry Jasper Redfern; 1871; Sheffield, Yorkshire (West Riding), England
- Died: 31 October 1928 (aged 56–57); Manchester, Lancashire, England
- Other names: H. Jasper Redfern, Jasper Redfern
- Occupations: optician, photographer, exhibitor, promoter, filmmaker, cinema pioneer, x-ray and radiographic pioneer
- Years active: 1885–1915
- Employer(s): W. Watson and Son; H. Jasper Redfern; Jasper Redfern's Palace by the Sea; Royal Army Medical Corps; Christie Hospital
- Spouse: 1

Henry Jasper Redfern, FSMC, BOA, (1871–1928), or Jasper Redfern was a British optician, photographer, exhibitor, filmmaker, proprietor of photographic and lantern retail business, cinema pioneer and x-ray and radiographic pioneer. The business card of Redfern stated: H. Jasper Redfern, Practical Optician and Scientist, 55 & 57 Surrey Street, Sheffield.

== Life and times ==
In 1871, Redfern was born at Sheffield, Yorkshire (West Riding), England. His parents were Walter Shepherd Redfern, age 31 (born at Sheffield, Yorkshire, England) and Sarah Rosebella Redfern, age 35 (born at Waddingham, Lincolnshire, England). In 1881, he was a resident at 40 Nicholson Road in Heeley, Sheffield, Yorkshire (West Riding), England. Redfern had one sister, Amy Eliza Redfern, age 11 and one brother, John William Redfern, age 7. In 1891, he lived with his parents and brother at 110 Pancras Square in St Pancras, London, England. His occupation was recorded as a photographer's apprentice. In 1894, he resided at 22 Stratford place in the Borough of Saint Pancras, East division, London, England. Redfern lived in a room he rented, the "front room on top floor, unfurnished" with rent of 11 shillings per week, with partial board, and rent paid to Mrs. Redfern at the same address. On 31 March 1901, Redfern resided at 28 Carter Knowle Road in Sheffield, Yorkshire (West Riding), England. His occupation was a qualified refractionist. Other persons listed in the household were his mother, sister and brother, a boarder, and a visitor. In 1908, he married Charlotte Annie Baldwin at Burnley, Lancashire, England. On 31 October 1928, Redfern died at Manchester, Lancashire, England.

== Career ==
Redfern began in cinema by filming local events, which were referred to as locals. He would stage short, often comic sequences. He presented the productions at screenings of these films in local halls. Later he owned cinema houses, including one at the seaside resort of Westcliff-on-Sea. The small company he controlled was not able to compete with the larger and professionally managed cinema companies, so market forces led to the decline in his business. Redfern operated a photographic studio, and sold cameras (and other optical goods including opera glasses). The cameras, instruments and articles he sold were inscribed with the name "Jasper Redfern". Redfern held the credentials FSMC, and BOA The designation FSMC was from the Fellowship in Optometry of the Worshipful Company of Spectacle Makers. The designation BOA came from membership in the British Optical Association. These were recognised qualifications from the General Optical Council.

In 1895, he was owner and proprietor of H. Jasper Redfern. In 1898, Redfern as an optician in Sheffield also offered photographic supplies and basic to advanced instruction in photography. He demonstrated Röntgen rays, and held exhibitions of the Lumière Cinématographe. Redfern was an agent for Lumière's Cinématographe in England. At this time Redfern operated in Sheffield from showrooms located at 55–57 Surrey Street and operated the 'Works and Studios' located at 104–106 Norfolk Street. He developed and exploited the niche market of "locals," short film of interest to a limited local area. In 1899, Redfern took on the role of sports photographer and travelled with his local football team. He photographed several major matches including the match at Crystal Palace when Sheffield United played Derby on 15 April 1899 in the Football Cup Final. He chose the title for the series, '’Football Events'’. Redfern was keen with other sports and found time to film local cricket matches, bicycle races and lifeboat competitions.

Frank Mottershaw and Redfern made the first motion pictures filmed outdoors in Sheffield. In 1900, Mottershaw formed the Sheffield Photo Company. A studio was built at Hanover Street and it was here that the motion picture, A Daring Daylight Burglary was produced in 1903.

In 1900, Redfern travelled to Africa with stops in Morocco, Tunisia, Algeria and created travelogues from his journeys. He decided to delve into the animated or moving picture business with his headliner, marqueed as 'World Renowned Animated Pictures and Refined Vaudeville Entertainments'. This routine performance was successful enough for him to own and operate a seaside summer show at Westcliffe, with the inviting name of 'Jasper Redfern's Palace by the Sea'. Redfern pursued the local film business until 1910, when he chose to focus his efforts on the optical and medical trades. Redfern produced and exhibited films up until 1915, before he decided to concentrate on research into x-rays and cancer treatment at Christie Hospital, Manchester. In 1928, Redfern died of cancer. His collection of motion picture memorabilia was donated to the Science Museum.

=== W. Watson and Son ===
From 1885 to 1895, he worked at the firm of W. Watson and Sons as a photographer's apprentice. Redfern would go on to become an agent for the firm of W. Watson and Son.

=== Fred Holmes ===
In 1894, Redfern teamed with Fred Holmes as manager. Holmes developed skills as photographer, animated picture operator and projectionist. In September 1896, Redfern presented at the YMCA in Sheffield, a double-bill of film and x-ray demonstrations with a Kineopticon, a projector he obtained from Birt Acres. The Kineopticon had recently been patented by Acres on 27 May 1895 and quickly became popular. Redfern was keen to capitalise of this new invention and took advantage of the public's interest and fascination with these new animated or moving pictures.

In 1898, Redfern secured an exclusive contract in England for the right to tour the groundbreaking, first feature film of the Corbett-Fitzsimmons boxing match of 1897. Redfern also secured or produced himself, films of local sporting events, and this proved to be a move towards making the headline feature as an event all by itself. He had the foresight to realise that a satisfied audience would return for future events and become loyal customers and customers that would return week after week. Redfern discovered a new market for the new medium of animated or motion pictures. He found new captive audiences and offered an afternoon's or evening's entertainment to church groups, clubs and societies. His approach helped to secure the public's acceptance for this new medium of film.

During the years 1899 to 1905, Holmes accompanied Redfern as he travelled throughout England. Redfern promoted and produced vaudeville and animated show. For two years during the summer tourist season, Redfern operated the 'Palace by the Sea' at Southend-on-Sea. At this location, he took still photographs and animated movies. When Redfern set up the first motion picture house in Sheffield, Holmes became the manager and general manager for Redfern's various endeavours in England. In 1912, Redfern closed the business and Redfern and Holmes no longer worked as a team. Holmes continued to manage the Central Hall in Sheffield.

Redfern returned to his earlier endeavours and experience with the utilisation of x-rays and x-ray photography.

=== H. Jasper Redfern et al. ===
In 1900, the firm of H. Jasper Redfern was located at 104 – 106 Norfolk Street in Sheffield. From 1901 to 1902, the firm of Jasper Redfern & Co. Ltd. had a location at 1 Orchard Street in Sheffield. From 1901 to 1907, the firm of Jasper Redfern & Co. Ltd. had a location at 53 – 57 Surrey Street in Sheffield. From 1901 to 1907, the firm of Jasper Redfern & Co. Ltd. had a location at 184 – 186 Norfolk Street in Sheffield. From 1905 to 1907, the firm of Jasper Redfern & Co. Ltd. had a location at Central Hall in Sheffield. About 1909, Redfern was issued a licence, good until 1913, in compliance with the Cinematograph Act 1909.

=== Jasper Redfern, Limited ===
On 18 September 1903, the following was published in The Photographic News:

"Jasper Redfern, Limited. – This company has just been registered with a capital of £5,000 in £1 shares, to adopt an agreement between H. J. Redfern and N. H. Deakin, to acquire the business carried on at 53, 55, and 57, Surrey Street, and 104 and 106, Norfolk Street, Sheffield, as "H. Jasper Redfern," and to carry on the business of opticians, refractionists, optical, photographic, and scientific instrument manufacturers and dealers, photographers, experts in animated photography and Röntgen rays, electricians, stationers, dealers in fancy goods, &c. The number of directors is not to be less than two or more than five; the first are H. J. Redfern and R. Hanbidge. Qualification £100. Remuneration as fixed by the company. Registered by Waterlow & Sons, Ltd., London Wall, E.C."

On 3 October 1904, the business of Jasper Redfern, Limited was closed on account of its liabilities. Mr. Norris Henry Deakin, Chartered Accountant, was appointed as Liquidator.

=== Jasper Redfern and Co., Limited ===
On 10 March 1905, the following was published in the British Journal of Photography:

"Registered February 24. Capital, £3,000 in £1 shares. Object, to acquire the business recently carried on at 55 to 57, Surrey Street, 104 and 106, Norfolk Street, both in Sheffield and elsewhere, as Jasper Redfern, Limited, to adopt an agreement between H. Jasper Redfern and G. W. Lloyd of the one part and E. Brook of the other part, and to carry on the business of opticians, refractionists, manufacturers of optical, photographic, and scientific instruments, photographers, experts in animated photography and Röntgen rays, electricians, public entertainers, etc. No initial public issue. The first directors (to number not less than two or more than five) are Jasper Redfern, G. W. Lloyd, and G. Mettham. Qualification, £1."

== 2nd Western General Hospital ==
During World War I, Redfern was called to serve as a field radiologist, and eventually was assigned to the 2nd Western General Hospital, which later became known as the Grangethorpe Hospital in Manchester. Sergeant Jasper Redfern was assigned to the clinical staff of the 2nd Western General Hospital. In 1914, he enlisted in the RAMC with the much needed skill as radiographer, particularly during wartime. The small x-ray department at the hospital was called upon to use the new technology of x-rays for diagnostic and therapeutic studies. Redfern, a pioneer in the field of x-rays and radiology, accepted the call to serve his fellow wounded soldiers. He became a martyr by performing radiographs and paid the price by losing all of his fingers from the radiation exposure. In 1928, Redfern died of cancer, probably due to his heroic efforts and prolonged exposure to radiation from x-rays.

== Artwork and Photographic collection ==
=== People and events ===
- In July 1897, the scoreboard was captured in a photograph to record the Jubilee Record at Bramall Lane at St Marys in Sheffield.
- Sir Charles Clifford, founder of the Dental Hospital. Photo taken at Sheffield.
- In 1899 or 1900, a group photograph of the Sheffield United Football Club with the English Cup and Ball at Sheffield.
- In 1900, the Hallamshire Volunteers were photographed in Chatsworth Park at Derbyshire in Sheffield. The photo depicts a large group of men on horseback with a few horse drawn carts.
- On Monday 19 February 1900, Redfern recorded a cinematographic film during the historic match that ended in a tie for the English Cup. Sheffield United played Sheffield Wednesday at Owlerton in Sheffield.
- In 1901, a group photograph was taken and titled: Rank & File NCO's Club Committee of the Fourth West Yorkshire Volunteers Artillery. Taken at Sheffield to mark the Challenge Cup in the Small Arms Competition.
- On 12 October 1901, Redfern was asked to photograph the members of Norton District Council, Norton Parish Council and Norton Burial Board at Norton in Sheffield.
- Redfern captured a portrait of a soldier from the Boer War. The photo depicts Private S. Lee of the York and Lancaster Regiment taken at Sheffield.

=== Royal Visits ===
- On 21 May 1897, Redfern recorded events during Queen Victoria's visit, including the decorations on Pinstone Street taken at Sheffield City Centre. The original photograph was a stereo pair.
- During Queen Victoria's visit, he captured the decorations in Barker's Pool taken at Sheffield City Centre. The original photograph was a stereo pair.
- On 12 July 1905, Redfern photographed the Royal Visit of King Edward VII and Queen Alexandra, with one picture captured the Royal Couple leaving the Town Hall at Sheffield City Centre.
- Royal Visit of King Edward VII and Queen Alexandra, Their Majesties arriving at the Town Hall and meeting the Lord Mayor of Sheffield at Sheffield City Centre.
- On 26 April 1909, Redfern photographed the Royal Visit of the Prince and Princess of Wales, who later became George V and Queen Mary outside the Town Hall at Sheffield City Centre. The Prince and Princess of Wales (later George V) made a Royal Visit at Sheffield to open the Edgar Allen Library at Sheffield University.

=== Parks and places ===
- In 1897, Redfern took an early photograph of Endcliffe Park taken at Endcliffe in Sheffield.
- Meersbrook Park at Meersbrook in Sheffield in 1897.
- In 1897, Redfern captured a scene at the Canal Wharf, Sheffield taken at Tinsley in Sheffield.
- In 1897, a photograph was taken in the Banquet Room of the Masonic Hall, Surrey Street, at Sheffield City Centre in Sheffield.
- About 1900, Redfern chose to photograph the privies of the former Spanish Steel Works later converted to the Theatre Royal, Pinfold Lane now Staniforth Road showing Chippingham Place (left), Chippingham Street (right) and Canal near Pinfold Bridge, photograph taken at Darnall in Sheffield. The Spanish Steel Works were converted to The Peoples Theatre and opened on Boxing Day 1896, renamed Theatre Royal on 13 December 1897 and later used as a cinema and renamed again to The Royal Picture House.
- A painting signed by J. Redfern titled: ‘’Old Hostelry on Nether Shire Lane.’’ Description: Mulberry tree in front, house dated 1716.

=== Churches ===
- The exterior of St Andrew's Church, St. Andrews Road was photographed in 1897 at Sharrow in Sheffield. The picture appears to have been taken with a wide angle lens.
- The interior St Andrew's Church, St. Andrews Road was photographed in 1897 at Sharrow in Sheffield.
- Brunswick Wesleyan Chapel, South Street, Moor at Sheffield City Centre.

== Filmography ==
=== Director ===
- 1899, Sheffield Cup: Tie Match at Bolton (Documentary short)
- 1899, Sheffield Cup: Tie Match at Nottingham (Documentary short)
- 1899, Sheffield United versus Derby (Documentary short)
- 1899, Sheffield United versus Liverpool (Documentary short)
- 1904, Launch of the Filey Lifeboat (Documentary short)
- 1904, The Monkey and the Ice Cream (Short) – An Italian vendor's monkey eats a girl's ice cream.
- 1905, Whit Monday Races at Filey (Documentary short)
- 1905, A Funny Story (Short) – A man's expression as he tells a funny story.
- 1905, Kick Me, I'm Bill Bailey (Short)
- 1905, Uncle Podger's Mishaps (Short) – Misadventures of a man and his mischievous nephews.

=== Cinematographer ===
- 1904, Stars of the Cricket World (Documentary short)

== Promoter ==
=== 1899 ===
- 14 February 1899, Shrove Tuesday Soiree, St Mary's Church; An Exhibition of Animated Photography, given in aid of Edison's latest and most perfect Cinematograph shown by Mr. H. Jasper Redfern
- 4 March 1899, Albert Hall, Sheffield; A Grand Comic Concert; Jasper Redfern's Animated Photographs and Living Pictures
- 3 April 1899, Albert Hall, Sheffield, Jasper Redfern's Animated Photographs and others
- 8 April 1899, Derby Temperance Hall; H. Jasper Redfern will give an exhibition of Animated Photography by aid of Edison's Latest and Most Perfected Cinematograph
- 11 Dec 1899, Meersbrook Bank Board School; Mr. Jasper Redfern's Entertainment
- 16 Dec 1899, Albert Hall, Sheffield; Jasper Redfern's New Views

=== 1900 ===
- 18 January 1900, Central Cycling Club, Cambridge Hall, Sheffield; Mr Jasper Redfern's Cinematograph, Local and war views
- 26 January 1900, Stephenson Memorial Hall, Chesterfield; Mayoral reception; Demonstration of Photography in Natural Colours by Mr Jasper Redfern and Animated Photographs
- 27 January 1900, Aldenham Institute Lantern Society; H. Jasper Redfern's Cinematograph Entertainment
- 29 January 1900, Village Hall, Cobham; Demonstration of Photography in Natural Colours by Mr Jasper Redfern, and other acts
- 30 January 1900, Village Hall, Cobham; Demonstration of Photography in Natural Colours by Mr Jasper Redfern, and other acts
- 10 February 1900, Derby Temperance Hall; H. Jasper Redfern's Animated Photographs and other acts
- 14 February 1900, Bolsover Colliery Cricket Club; Grand Concert and Exhibition of Animated Photographs
- 17 February 1900, Albert Hall, Sheffield; Jasper Redfern's Boer War Pictures, and other acts
- 19 February 1900, Catholic Social Union, St Mary's Boys' Club, Sheffield; Mr Jasper Redfern's Cinematograph, and other acts
- 23 February 1900, Central Higher School, Sheffield; Selections on Edison's grand concert Phonograph, followed by demonstrations of Photography in Natural Colours by Mr Jasper Redfern
- 28 February 1900, Montgomery Hall, Sheffield; Mr and Mrs. J.G. Graves' Social Evening and Ball Featuring Mr. Jasper Redfern's Cinematograph Exhibition amongst others
- 3 March 1900, Albert Hall, Sheffield; Jasper Redfern's Boer War Views, and other acts
- 10 March 1900, Albert Hall, Sheffield; Jasper Redfern's Boer War Views, and other acts
- 29 March 1900, Primitive Methodist Conversazione; H. Jasper Redfern's Animated Photographs and other acts
- 3 April 1900, Sheffield Photographic Society, Masonic Hall; Annual Musical Evening Includes Cinematographic Exhibition from Mr. J. Redfern
- 26 April 1900, Victoria School, Wath-on-Dearne; Grand Entertainment, Jasper Redfern's Animated Photographs and other acts
- 28 April 1900, Derby Temperance Hall; Jasper Redfern's Animated Photographs and other acts
- 24 May 1900, Albert Hall, Sheffield; Jasper Redfern's Cinematograph: Pictures of the Boer War, and other acts
- 10 October 1900, The Pavilion, Wath-on-Dearne; Jasper Redfern's Animated Photographs and other acts
- 31 December 1900, Abbeydale Primitive Methodist Church, Sheffield; A Grand Sacred Concert and Cinematograph representation (By Mr Jasper Redfern) of the German Oberammergau Passion Play

=== 1901 ===
- 7 February 1901, Sheffield Empire Theatre of Varieties; Jasper Redfern's Animated Pictures, and other acts
- 5 March 1901, Castlefold's Market Employees' Eighth Annual Tea & Concert; H. Jasper Redfern's Animated Pictures, and other acts
- 19 October 1901, Young Men's Christian Association, Sheffield; Programme of the President's 'At Home' Cinematograph by Mr Jasper Redfern
- 19 October 1901, Joseph Pickering & Sons, Limited, Sheffield. Employees'; Mr Redfern's, Cinematograph, and other acts
- 26 November 1901, Sheffield and District Press Club; Programme for Sat 23 November 1901; Arthur Dawes – Vocalist, J. A. Rodgers – Vocalist, J. B. Slack – Vocalist, Harry Heath – Vocalist, Maurice Taylor – cello, Mr Hinchcliffe – violin, Messrs A. Bagshaw, Taylor and Hinchcliffe; Mr H. Jasper Redfern – cinematograph exhibition

=== 1902 ===
- 18 August 1902, New Palace Theatre, Hull; Programme for Monday, 18 August 1902; Alice Cooke – transformation dancer; The Maisanos – Continental Musical Grotesques; Sybil St. Elmo – Ballad Vocalist; Ross and Grayson – Comedy Act; Edwin Boyde – comedian; Redfern's Pictures, The Coronation of King Edward VII; Millie Hylton, James O'Connor and Charles Brady – Knockabout Comedians; Little Gitana – child vocalist; Sisters Morgan Duettists and Dancers; Glenroy Troupe – Male and Female Characteristic Dancers and Speciality Performers
- 22 September 1902, Town Hall, Brighouse; Jasper Redfern's No. 1 Vaudeville Company; Jasper Redfern's Singing and Living Pictures; Herbert Betts – comedian; J.E. Linstead – Baritone Vocalist; Edison's Latest Marvel: The Phonometograph; George Dinnie, the finest developed man in the world

=== 1904–1905 ===
- 20 June 1904, Victoria Hall, Sheerness; Jasper Redfern's World renowned Animated Pictures
- 12–13 April 1905, Public Hall Harwich; Programme for 12 and 13 April 1905; Featuring Jasper Redfern's World Renowned Animated Pictures and grand Vaudeville Combination
- 9 – 14 May 1905, Empire, Southend-on-Sea; Programme for Monday 9 May – Saturday 14 May 1905; Jasper Redfern's World Renowned Animated Pictures; Various films; Testo Brothers – comedy, musical and acrobatic act; Mr. and Mrs. Edward H. Lucas – society entertainers; J.E. Linstead – Yorkshire Baritone; William Salmon – trick cyclist and musical cyclist

=== 1907 ===
- 6 May 1907, Central Hall, Sheffield; Programme of Jasper Redfern's World-renowned Animated Pictures and refined Vaudeville Entertainments
- 13 May 1907, Central Hall, Sheffield; Programme of Jasper Redfern's World-renowned Animated Pictures and refined Vaudeville Entertainments
- 16 December 1907, Central Hall, Sheffield; Programme of Jasper Redfern's World-renowned Animated Pictures and refined Vaudeville Entertainments

=== 1910 ===
- 1 December 1910, Grand Theatre, Manchester; Many acts including Animated Pictures

=== Unspecified date, 1900s ===
- 1900s, Albert Hall, Cookridge St., Leeds; Christmas Entertainment; Featuring Jasper Redfern's Cinematographic representation of the Passion Play
- 16 March early 1900s, Sheffield YMCA Conversazione; Cimematograph Display by Mr. H. Jasper Redfern; And other acts
- 31 March early 1900s, Ecclesall Primrose League Annual Dance; Featuring Mr H. Jasper Redfern's Animated Photographs, showing the latest War Pictures
- 10 June early 1900s, Assembly Hall, Saltburn; A Grand Sacred Concert and Cinematograph representation (By Mr Jasper Redfern) of the Oberammergau Passion Play
- 30 October 1900s, Central Hall, Sheffield; Programme of Jasper Redfern's World-renowned Animated Pictures and refined Vaudeville Entertainments
- Early 1900s, Palace Theatre, Hull; George Dinnie the Strongest man on Earth will wrestle with Jack Carkeek; Mr George Dinnie appears by the kind permission of Mr. Jasper Redfern, now at the Circus.
- Early 1900s, Public Hall (Harvey Institute) Barnsley; Jasper Redfern's Superb Animated and Singing Pictures; The Falcons, Acrobatic and Hand Balancing Speciality; Harry Heath (Humorist); Edison's Latest Marvel, the Phonometograph; Herbert Betts (Comedian); Grand Gladiatorial Display by Mr George Dinnie
- Early 1900s, Devonshire Halle, Morecambe; Jasper Redfern's Animated and Packed House Monkey Company; Special Attraction of the Sloppy Faced Bloated Blood Nosed Comedian, Herbert Betts; George Dinnie, Strongman; JE Linstead – Baritone; Mr Phonograph with Dolly Gray and others; Professor Fred; 'The Manager will nurse babies at 1D per Hour’
- Early 1900s, Circus, Anlaby Road, Hull; Featuring Anglo American Animated Photo Co., Jasper Redfern's No. 1 Vaudeville Company; Animated Photographs and singing pictures
- Early 1900s, Agricultural Hall, Norwich; Featuring Jasper Redfern's Animated Pictures
- Early 1900s, Montgomery Hall, Sheffield; Jasper Redfern's Grand Vaudeville Combination and World-renowned Animated pictures
- Early 1900s, Central Hall, Sheffield; Programme of Jasper Redfern's World-renowned Animated Pictures and refined Vaudeville Entertainments
- Early 1900s, Athenaeum, Lancaster; Jasper Redfern's High Class Concert and Variety Entertainment; Louie Lawrence – vocalist; Herbert Betts – Comedian; Jasper Redfern's Animated photographs; Mr J. E. Linstead – vocalist; Mr George Dinnie – Gladiatorial Display and weight lifting; Phonometograph
- Early 1900s, They Bother Him Sometimes; Claremont Tiger Division; Programme featuring Jasper Redfern's Cinematograph exhibition; J. G. Graves' Westville Pierrot Troupe
- Early 1900s, Prince of Wales Circus (Hippodrome) Scarborough; Jasper Redfern's Vaudeville and Animated Picture Company; Professor William Edward Gillin – ventriloquist; The Falcons – acrobats & hand balancers; Master Leonard Ankers – boy comedian; Madame McMullen – Soprano Vocalist; Mr Charlton Howarth – tenor vocalist; Mdlle. Dulcie Murielle – Solo Pianist
- Early 1900s, Central Hall, Norfolk Street, Sheffield; Jasper Redfern's Animated Pictures
- Early 1900s, Public Hall (Harvey Institute) Barnsley; Minni Letta's Sporting Girls; Miss Edie Endon, Dainty little coon songstress; Harry Clyo & Rose Rochelle – comedy; Fox & Melville – American Song Illustrators; Percy Farrimond – Lancashire Singing Collier; Miss Gracie Logan – Pert Soubrette and Graceful dancer; The Great Cinizelli – Funny Acrobatic Furniture and plate smashing; Jasper Redfern's Animated Pictures; A. P. Boswell – The Black Diamond; Sisters Mayo – vocalists and Dancers; Eugene & Willie – Musical Grotesques; The 4 Andys – Comedy
