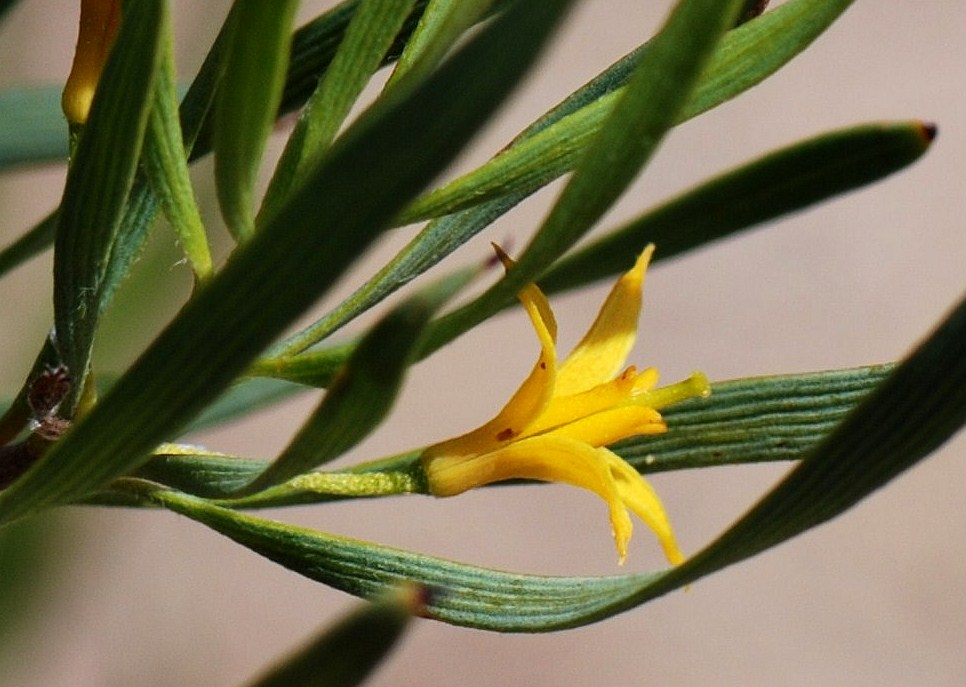

Scientific classification
- Kingdom: Plantae
- Clade: Tracheophytes
- Clade: Angiosperms
- Clade: Eudicots
- Order: Proteales
- Family: Proteaceae
- Genus: Persoonia
- Species: P. quinquenervis

Binomial name
- Persoonia quinquenervis Hook.

Synonyms
- Linkia quinquenervis (Hook.) Kuntze; Linkia striolata (Meisn.) Kuntze; Persoonia striolata Meisn.

= Persoonia quinquenervis =

Species of flowering plant

Persoonia quinquenervis is a species of flowering plant in the family Proteaceae and is endemic to the south-west of Western Australia. It is an erect, spreading shrub with hairy young branchlets, twisted linear, lance-shaped, narrow oblong or narrow spatula-shaped leaves, and bright yellow flowers borne in groups of up to ten on a rachis up to 60 mm (2.4 in) that continues to grow after flowering.

== Description ==
Persoonia quinquenervis is an erect, spreading shrub that typically grows to a height of 0.2–2.5 m (7.9 in – 8 ft 2.4 in) with smooth bark, sometimes rough and peeling near the base and young branchlets that are covered with greyish or whitish hair for the first year or two. The leaves are linear, lance-shaped, narrow oblong or narrow spatula-shaped, and twisted at the base, 20–75 mm (0.79–2.95 in) long and 0.8–10 mm (0.031–0.394 in) wide usually with longitudinal ridges on both surfaces. The flowers are arranged in groups of up to ten along a rachis up to 60 mm (2.4 in) long that continues to grow after flowering, each flower on a pedicel 4–17 mm (0.16–0.67 in) long with a leaf or a scale leaf at the base. The tepals are bright yellow, 7.5–15 mm (0.30–0.59 in) long. Flowering mostly occurs from November to December and the fruit is a smooth oval drupe 8–12 mm (0.31–0.47 in) long and 4–6 mm (0.16–0.24 in) wide.

== Taxonomy ==
Persoonia quinquenervis was first formally described in 1842 by William Jackson Hooker in his Icones Plantarum from specimens collected in the Swan River Colony by James Drummond.

== Distribution and habitat ==
This geebung grows in heath, thicket, woodland and forest in the area between Latham, Boyagin Nature Reserve, Tarin Rock, Frank Hann National Park and Yellowdine in the Avon Wheatbelt, Coolgardie, Esperance Plains, Geraldton Sandplains, Jarrah Forest, Mallee and Swan Coastal Plain biogeographic regions in the south-west of Western Australia.

== Conservation status ==
Persoonia pungens is classified as "not threatened" by the Government of Western Australia Department of Parks and Wildlife.
