= Desperate Poaching Affray =

1903 British film by William Haggar

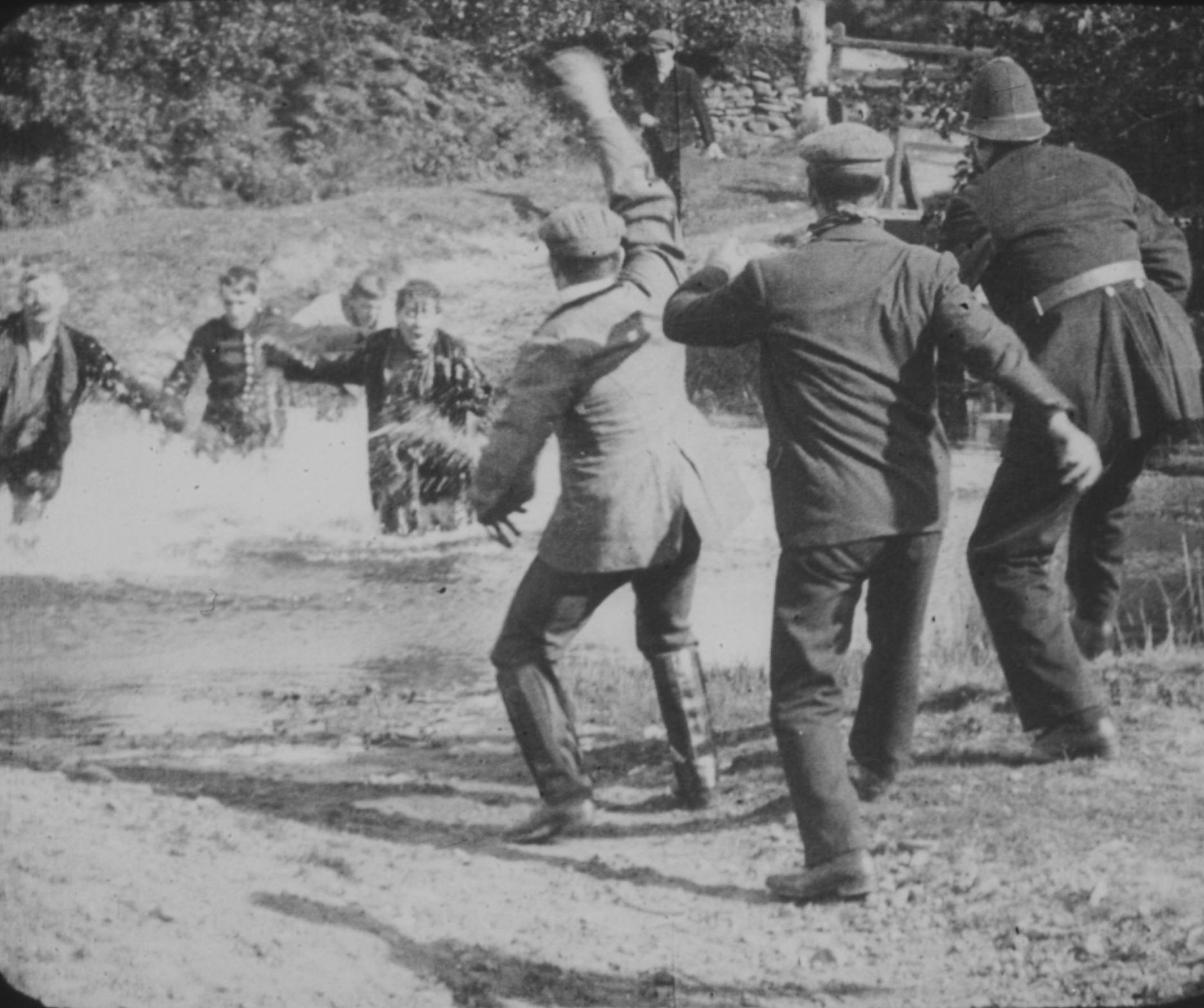
- Directed by: William Haggar
- Written by: William Haggar
- Produced by: William Haggar & Sons
- Starring: Walter Haggar, Will Haggar Jr.
- Distributed by: Gaumont
- Release dates: July 1903 (UK); October 1903 (U.S.)
- Running time: 3 minutes
- Country: United Kingdom
- Language: Silent film

Desperate Poaching Affray (known in the United States as The Poachers) is a 1903 British chase film by Wales-based film producer William Haggar. Three minutes long, the film is recognised as an early influence on narrative drama in American film, especially in the chase genre. The film used a number of innovative techniques including on-location shooting, panning shots, and unconventional use of screen edges. The film, along with Frank Mottershaw's film A Daring Daylight Burglary, is considered to have helped launch the chase subgenre and influenced Edwin S. Porter's The Great Train Robbery.

== Plot ==
The film plot is slight and consists of a group of three hunters coming across two poachers. A chase ensues and the poachers flee while shots are exchanged. Despite the film's rural setting, the hunters are able to call upon police officers who join in the chase before the poachers are apprehended while crossing a stream.

== Film history ==
British director William Haggar was a pioneer of narrative film making who began making shorts in 1902. Haggar and his family were travelling entertainers who had based themselves in Wales, and they shot their films in the open using the props they had acquired over their years as a theatre troupe. In 1903 Haggar shot Desperate Poaching Affray, a three-minute (174 ft.) short on 35mm film. The film stars two of Haggar's children, Walter and William Jr., a common trait of his films.

On its release the film was very successful with audiences, and was distributed by Gaumont in both Europe and the United States. It was so popular that it was widely pirated, and is now seen as an influential film to the chase genre, inspiring Edwin S. Porter's The Great Train Robbery.

Desperate Poaching Affray is in turn influenced by Frank Mottershaw's film A Daring Daylight Burglary, also 1903. In Haggar's film similar to Mottershaw's there is a cutting of action, as a character runs towards the camera to leave via the screen edge. The pursuers are nowhere to be seen in one shot, before entering dramatically onto the screen from the front. In another cut the villains exit the scene to the left, then emerge after a cut in the foreground, in a shot that suggests the chase has been continuing for longer than the screen time. Haggar continues to use different angles in the film and introduces his first panning shot, showing Haggar had a rudimentary understanding of early film grammar and conventions. Despite Haggar's theatrical background, and apart from one wild over-acted haymaker swing from William Haggar Jr. as he floors an opponent, the film refuses to follow theatricality or staging.

The film was renamed as The Poachers for its release in the United States, and was first screened by travelling cinema pioneer Lyman H. Howe of Pennsylvania, who in his early days showed respectable movies to Methodist groups. Howe's biographer, Charles Musser, surmised that Howe showed the film with its 'sensationalistic violence' because as 'one of the cinema's first chase films it proved an irresistible choice.' Musser goes on to state that both Haggar's and Mottershaw's films inspired the US 'film chase craze', stressing that Desperate Poaching Affray was one of at least three UK films copied and sold by the Edison, Biograph and Sigmund Lubin's company between June and October 1903.

== Bibliography ==
- Berry, David (1996). Wales and Cinema, The First Hundred Years. Cardiff: University of Wales Press. ISBN 0-7083-1370-1.
