= Ann Maddocks =

Welsh maid

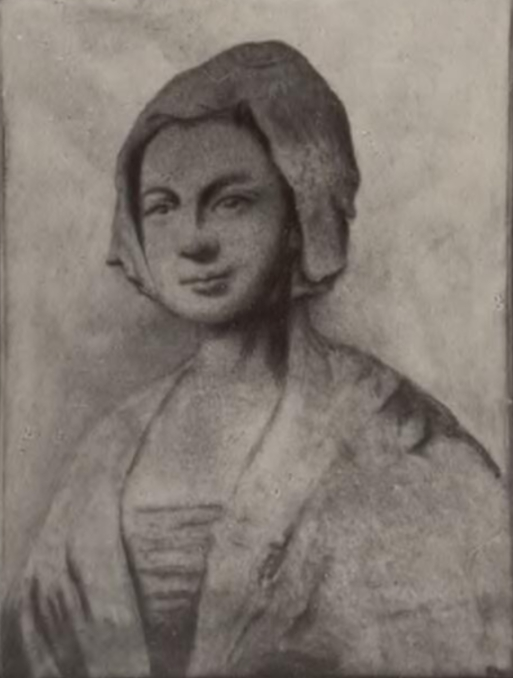
19c portrait

Ann Maddocks (born Thomas, 1704–1727) was a Welsh maid who according to tradition was forced to marry against her wishes and died pining for her true love. She is also known by the poetic name, The Maid of Cefn Ydfa.

Ann Thomas was born in 1704 to William Thomas of Cefn Ydfa, Llangynwyd, Maesteg and his wife Catherine Price of Tynton, Llangeinor, who was sister to Rees Price, the father of philosopher Richard Price. Thomas and Price married in 1703, but her father died in 1706, and tradition tells that he had placed Ann in the wardship of Anthony Maddocks, a lawyer from Cwmrisga. Maddocks decided that Ann would marry his son, also called Anthony, and records show that the two were married on 4 May 1725.

== The folklore ==
The legend states that Ann had fallen in love not with the wealthy Maddocks, but with the poet and thatcher, Wil Hopcyn (William Hopkin) and when discovered were forbidden to see each other. Ann was kept prisoner, locked in her bedroom in the Manor house. The families were determined that the union between Anthony Maddocks and Ann would take place. However, the couple continued their relationship by sending love letters to each other in secret, taken by one of her maidservants and hidden in a hollow in an oak tree on the Cefn Ydfa estate. When these communications were uncovered, Ann's mother took away her writing materials. Legend then has it that she took to writing on leaves plucked from the tree outside her bedroom window in her own blood. Unable to be with Ann, Hopcyn left the area; Ann married Anthony Maddocks. Ann is said to have pined so desperately for her lover that she fell seriously ill. On her death bed she asked to see Hopcyn, and when he arrived she died in his arms.

Ann Maddocks died in 1727 and was buried on 6 June in St Cynwyd's Church, Llangynwyd. A memorial cross outside the church is dedicated to Wil Hopcyn.

== Interpretations ==
Several interpretations of the legend have been made in many different formats. Welsh antiquarian Griffith John Williams related and discussed the story in an edition of the journal Y Llenor (1928).

The Welsh language novel Y Ferch o Gefn Ydfa (1881) by Isaac Hughes (Craigfryn) is based on the story.

The story of the Maid of Cefn Ydfa is commemorated in the traditional song Bugeilio'r Gwenith Gwyn (Tending the white wheat), and in an opera by Welsh composer Joseph Parry based on the words of this song which are attributed to Wil Hopkyn and Dafydd Nicolas.

In 1904, William Haggar released a silent film, The Maid of Cefn Ydfa interpreting the events, with his family cast as the main characters of the tale.

In the early 1970s Viv Paget wrote the play Sonnet for a Summer's Day which was widely performed in Britain.
