= Donald Dinnie =

Scottish strongman

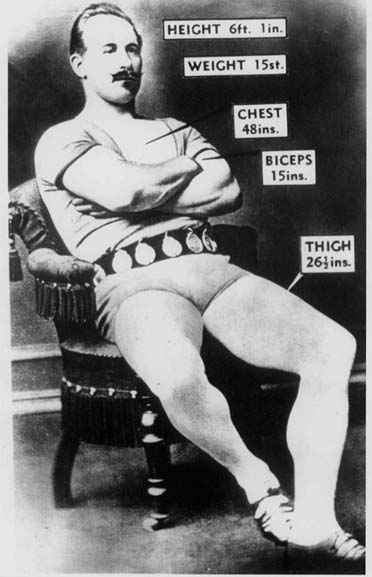
- Born: Donald Dinnie; 10 July 1837; Birse, Scotland
- Died: 2 April 1916 (aged 78); London, England
- Occupation: Highland Games strongman
- Height: 6 ft 1 in (1.85 m)
- Children: Edwin

Competition record

Highland Games

Representing Scotland

Scottish Highland Games Championships
Champion	1856
Champion	1857
Champion	1858
Champion	1859
Champion	1860
Champion	1861
Champion	1862
Champion	1863
Champion	1864
Champion	1865
Champion	1866
Champion	1867
Champion	1868
Champion	1869
Champion	1870
Champion	1871
Champion	1872
Champion	1873
Champion	1874
Champion	1875
Champion	1876

Donald Dinnie (10 July 1837 – 2 April 1916) was a Scottish strongman, wrestler, and multi-sport athlete, born at Balnacraig, Birse, near Aboyne, Aberdeenshire. Sometimes regarded as "The Nineteenth Century's greatest athlete", Dinnie's athletic career spanned over 50 years, and over 11,000 successful competitions.

== Early life ==
The son of stonemason Robert Dinnie, born on 10 July 1837, he was one of eight sons, and had two sisters. Also known for being a poet, author and historian, Robert and his wife were married in 1836.

Dinnie won his first sporting event, at the age of 16, in the nearby village of Kincardine O'Neil. He defeated the local wrestling strongman David Forbes, and took first place, winning £1 prize money.

== Sporting career ==
Dinnie became an all-round athlete, growing and building his skills over a 21-year reign as Scottish champion (1856–1876). He excelled in sprint, hurdles, long and high jump, pole vault, putting the stone, hammer throw, tossing the caber and several styles of wrestling. The BBC website says "Comparing his best performances long before the Athens Olympics of 1896 leads one to imagine him capable of winning seven gold, a silver, and a bronze medal". However, by 1896, Dinnie was approaching the twilight of his sporting career.

In the 1860s, Dinnie brought the Lancashire catch-as-catch-can style to Scotland. He was reportedly a "poor hand" at "first down to lose" wrestling but excelled at ground wrestling.

Dinnie was a 19th-century superstar, with widespread fame, success, and riches. Dinnie held the title "World Champion Wrestler", and was regarded as the "greatest athlete in the world", and "The Strong Man of the Age". He was so well known that "heavy artillery shells in the First World War were nicknamed 'Donald Dinnies'." His documented achievements worldwide consist of "2,000 hammer throwing contests, over 2,000 wrestling matches, 200 weightlifting contests, and about 500 running and hurdle events. He also made a good living at all this, earning at least £25,000 in his career, a sum that would be worth about US $2.5 million today. And to this day his image continues to endorse commercial products in Scotland."

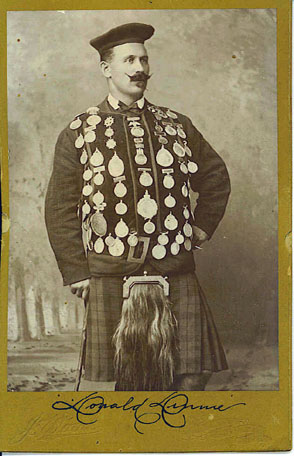
Donald Dinnie displaying some of his medals

=== Touring ===
As Scotland's greatest athlete, Dinnie competed in sixteen Highland Games seasons in his native land. He first toured the United States' Caledonian Circuit in 1870. In that year he earned a fortune. Dinnie, then thirty-three, was titled "The Nineteenth Century's Greatest Athlete". However, others despised and criticised Dinnie for his incredible strength. He continued to tour, and in his 60th year he was in New Zealand and Australia as a successful professional athlete.

His North American tour included Milwaukee, Toronto, Montreal, Hamilton, Kingstown, Philadelphia, Detroit Caledonian Club annual games, and Brooklyn Caledonian Club.

His Antipodean tours included Goulburn (January 1890), Melbourne (March 1884), Goulburn (September 1884), Sydney (October 1884), Toowoomba (November 1884), Warwick (December 1884), Cooma (April 1885), New Zealand (June 1896), and Sydney (March 1898).

He also participated in the Cape Town, South Africa, Caledonian sports day on 30 May 1898.

During the 1880s and 1890s he competed in mixed style wrestling challenge matches for money and for titles in Australian and New Zealand. These were in various styles including Cornish wrestling and Greco-Roman.

=== Later years ===
Dinnie continued to be involved in theatres and at Highland Games as a judge, or in veteran events, until 1912. In 1903 Robert Barr invited him to endorse his soft drink Iron Brew, using Dinnie's image on the label with Dinnie proclaiming "I can recommend BARR's IRON BREW to all who wish to aspire to athletic fame, signed Donald Dinnie, All-round Champion Athlete of the World." Later in Dinnie's life he struggled financially, and in his 70s was still performing as a strongman in London. His act was to support a platform made from a large table while two Highlanders danced a "fling" on it. Eventually London authorities terminated his performing licence because of his advanced age. To help with his situation, a benefit concert was organised which provided him with a small annuity.

It was said Dinnie had appeared before every monarch in Europe, and was a favourite with Queen Victoria.

Whilst mentioned in newspapers, Scottish-Australian wrestler and strongman George Dinnie (1875–1939) was not the known son or relative of Donald.

=== Achievements ===
Some of his records were given as:

- running high leap – 5'11 5 feet 11 inches (1.80 m)
- running long leap – 20'11 20 feet 11 inches (6.38 m)
- high jump – 6 feet 1 inch (1.85 m)
- long jump – 20 feet 1 inch (6.12 m)
- hop, step and jump – 44 feet (13 m).
- 100 yards (91 m) run – 10 2/5 sec
- hammer throw, fair stand – 104 feet 6 inches (31.85 m) (1871)
- put the 16 pounds (7.3 kg) stone – 49 feet 6 inches (15.09 m) (1868)
- throw 22 pounds (10.0 kg) weight by the ring, fair stand – 39 feet 9 inches (12.12 m) (1868)
- throw 56 pounds (25 kg) weight by the ring, fair stand – 29 feet 4 inches (8.94 m) (1868).

== Later life ==
Dinnie later got married. Their family included a son, Edwin.

Dinnie and his family lived in Glasgow, where they owned a fish and chip restaurant and tea-room in the Govan area. They then lived for two or three years in Newcastle, England, before finally settling in London.

His mother died on Saturday 11 April 1891 aged 81, when Dinnie was aged about 54, at the family residence of 'Wood Cottage' near Kincardine O'Neil. Robert died on Thursday, 29 October 1891 at the residence.

By 1913 Dinnie was living in poverty, and a testimonial fund was being organised to assist him in his old age. Dinnie died in London in Sunday 2 April 1916, aged 78 years, and is buried at the Hanwell Cemetery. Such was his status that in the United States, The New York Times paid tribute in the paper's obituary column.

== Legacy ==
In 2002, Donald Dinnie was inducted into the Scottish Sports Hall of Fame in Edinburgh. Donald's relative Gordon Dinnie accepted a cut glass trophy on Donald's behalf. Gordon Dinnie also owned an original astrakhan breastplate that carries 19 medals won by Donald Dinnie from 1860 to 1896. A 23 inches (58 cm) carved statuette of Donald Dinnie, engraved with the words "Presented to Donald Dinnie, Champion Athlete In Appreciation of his Athletic Prowess, by his Scotch Friends, In Newcastle 1870", is in the Aberdeen Art Gallery along with many of Dinnie's medals.

=== The Dinnie Stones ===
In 1860, Dinnie undertook a feat of strength that was to give birth to a long-lasting legacy. He carried two granite boulders with a combined weight of 733 pounds (332 kg), now known as the Dinnie Stones, for a distance of more than 17 feet (5.2 m), across the width of the Potarch Bridge. Each boulder had an iron ring fixed to it, to counterweight scaffolds from which workmen could repair the bridge, over the River Dee near Kincardine O'Neil.

As of August 2018, 90 men and three women have managed to lift the stones, and six men (including Donald and later his father) have carried them the full distance. The stones are now displayed outside the Potarch Café and Restaurant, on the south bank of the river by the Potarch Bridge.

Lifting the Dinnie Stones (locally also "Stanes" and "Steens") remains a perpetual challenge. To claim a successful lift in the unassisted (without the aid of straps), a person must get wind beneath both stones to claim a full lift, and also full lock out the arms and legs.

The current record of holding them up unassisted is 41.00 seconds and was set on 21 January 2019 by Mark Haydock of Lancashire, England. On 7 September 2019, American strongman Brian Shaw set the new world record for continuously carrying the stones, which he did for 11 ft 6 1/2 inches.

The first assisted lift by a woman was in 1979 by Jan Todd, with the first unassisted lift (without the aid of straps) on 19 January 2019 by Emmajane Smith.

== A few of Donald Dinnie's Highland Games Award ==
Below are a few medals still portrayed in Aberdeen's museum.

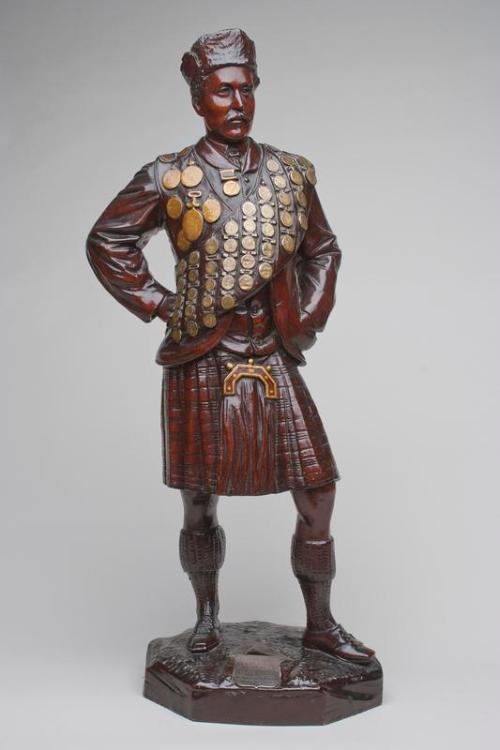
figurine by Gerrard Robinson - 1870

=== Athlete's Medal for Tossing the Caber c. 1850 ===
The medal given to Donal Dinnie has 'Champion for Tossing the Caber' written across It is a sporting medal that is circular and has an engraved border and a plain outer edge.

Dimensions: Depth: 0.4 cm, Diameter: 4.8 cm

=== Athlete's Medal for Throwing the Hammer c. 1855 ===
The medal given to Donal Dinnie with an engraving written across. It is a sporting medal that is circular and has an engraved border and a plain outer edge. The engraving says 'Champion for Throwing the Hammer 17 lbs 112 ft '.

Dimensions : Depth: 0.4, Diameter: 4.8 cm

=== Athlete's Medal for Throwing the Heavy Hammer at the Caledonian Club Games, Sacramento c. 1859 ===
The medal given to Donal Dinnie with an engraving written across that says 'Caledonian Club Sacramento: Throwing Heavy Hammer 1st Prize.' It is a sporting medal that is circular and have an wreath border engraved with a ribbon bar.

=== Athlete's Medal for Hurdle Racing at the Perth Highland games c. 1865 ===
Circular silver metal sporting medal with decorative scroll loop and ring attached at the top and an engraved thistle wreath border. The medal also features a coat of arms and an engraved inscription 'First Prize for Hurdle Race 1865: Perth Highland Society' and was awarded to Donald Dinnie.

Dimensions: Depth: 0.2 cm, Diameter: 5.5 cm

=== Athlete's Medal for Wrestling at the Dundee Highland Games c. 1867 ===
This oval shaped sporting medal has engraved 'Champion Medal of Scotland for Wrestling' across. It was awarded to Donald Dinnie in 1867 and it is silver plated with a chased scroll and foliate design.

Dimensions: Width: 7.2 cm, Depth: 0.2 cm

Maximum: Height: 12.4 cm

=== Athlete's Medal for Putting the Stone at the Perth Highland Games c. 1871 ===
Awarded to Donald Dinnie in 1871, across the circular sporting medal says 'Champion Medal for Putting Stone.' It has a thistle wreath border.

Dimensions:Depth: 0.6 cm, Diameter: 4.3 cm

== Titles ==
- World Champion Wrestler
- Scottish Champion, 1856–1876
- Strongest Man in the World
- Greatest Athlete in the World
- Champion of the world in 5 styles mixed wrestling, 1885
