= George Dinnie =

Scottish sportsman and professional wrestler (1875–1939)

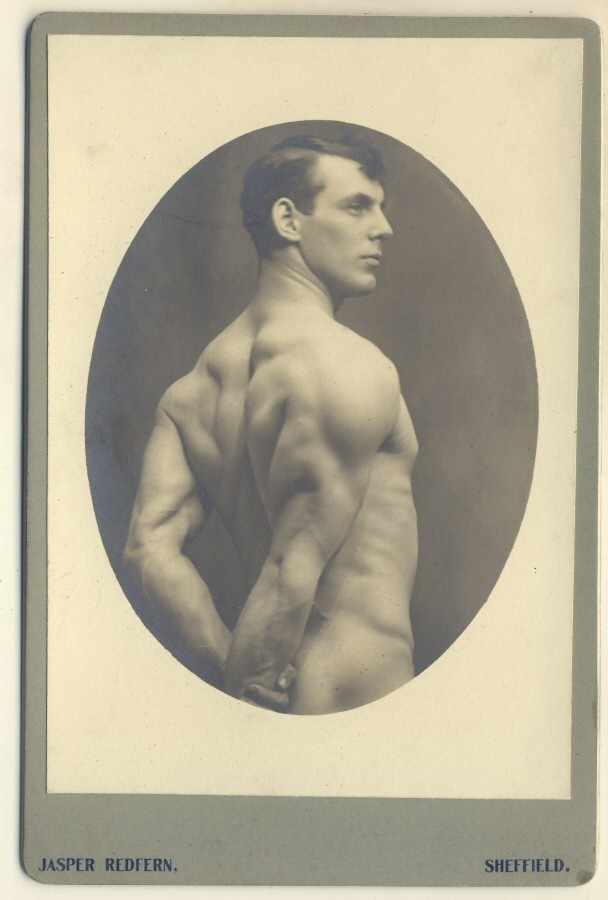

Personal information
- Born: July 18, 1875 Ayr, South Ayrshire, Scotland, United Kingdom
- Died: 13 June 1939 (aged 63) Kalgoorlie, Western Australia, Australia

Professional wrestling career

George Dinnie (18 July 1875 – 13 June 1939) was a sportsman, strongman, wrestler and champion dog breeder. For a while, he was part of the travelling show promoted by Henry Jasper Redfern in Sheffield, England, and often billed as the "strongest man on earth".

== Early life ==
In 1875, Dinnie was born at Ayr, South Ayrshire, Scotland, United Kingdom, although this has not been substantiated.

While many newspapers reported Dinnie as being the son of world-renown strongman and noted champion of the Highland Games, Donald Dinnie (1837–1916), no specific evidence confirms this familial relation. If George Dinnie was related to Donald Dinnie, George was considered to have not reached the level of the famous Dinnie. Even while George Dinnie was alive, the lack of association was stated:

The first man to wrestle in true Highland costume, "kilties an' a'" was the famous Donald Dinnie. He was the original Dinnie of 45 years ago, and no connection, except from a namesake point of view of George Dinnie, late of the W.A. Police Department and now farming up in the Midlands.

== Athletic career ==
Making his mark in the catch-as-catch-can and Cumberland styles of wrestling, Dinnie had been toured English and Scottish music halls as the wrestling partner of American Jack Carkeek (1861–1924). Both Dinnie and Carkeek migrated to Australia in 1904, under contract to Harry Rickards (1843–1911).

In June 1904 at the Opera House, Melbourne, Dinnie competed with Carkeek, the latter billed elsewhere as the 'champion catch-as-catch-can wrestler of the world'. Dinnie's shoulder was pinned frequently by Carkeek, 'but every time Dinnie — whose occasional exclamations showed him to be the possessor of a rich Scotch accent — by some clever counter move managed to wriggle out of Carkeek's hold'. The finish was sensational at 9 minutes and 5 seconds, Carkeek winning by throwing Dinnie within fifteen minutes.

Following a difference of opinion, Carkeek and Dinnie went their separate ways. Dinnie then joined the Perth Fire Brigade, and then linked up with gymnasium instructor Constable Billy Innes (–1951) of the Police Traffic Branch, bringing Dinnie into the wrestling limelight of the State of Western Australia. After almost 2.5 years in the fire brigade, in 1906, he joined the state police force; meanwhile considered the best wrestler in the State.

Later Dinnie wrestled with Englishman Bert Woods, a wrestling partner to Estonian strongman George Hackenschmidt (1877–1968), and was declared the winner. They later met up at a Hay Street venue, and Dinnie won again – but because he had taken French leave (absent without approval) from duty, he was suspended pending an inquiry, for which he then resigned and returned to the music halls.

On Friday 12 June 1908 at the Melbourne Athletic Club, Exhibition Street, in the catch-as-catch-can wrestling style, Dinnie with 'an undefeated record' competed with Buttan Singh. Singh was billed by Wirth Brothers Circus as one of the 'champion Hindu wrestlers of Australia'. The meeting between the 'burly Scotchman and the sinewy Hindu', weighing 14 stone 10 pounds (93 kg; 206 lb) and 11 stone 4 pounds (72 kg; 158 lb)) respectively, saw Singh use Dinnie's force to his own advantage, with a result that neither man could throw the other: 'Dinnie was too heavy and powerful for Buttan to pin to the mat, and Buttan was too clever for Dinnie. After an hour and a-quarter's wrestling, during which Buttan gave an exhibition of wonderful skill, a draw was declared'.

A return match for the 'championship of Australia' and £100 on Saturday night, 15 August 1908, was organised, with Dinnie securing two out of the three falls, 'his great strength telling'.

He returned to Perth, and competed against big Lancashire wrestler Peter Bannon at His Majesty's Theatre on 21 September 1908; the decision going to Bannon, setting about a dispute for more than two decades.

From the time that he walked on to the stage it was apparent that Dinnie was to be treated in a hostile manner by a section of the spectators. He was reminded on more than one occasion, while struggling with Bannon on the mat, of the evening upon which he hurled Woods into the orchestral pit. When the punching described above took place it was the opinion of nine of every ten persons who saw it that an endeavour had been made by Dinnie to threat Bannon in a similar manner to that in which he had treated Woods. The referee said that this was his undoubted opinion, and that for that reason he had awarded the contest to Bannon.

What for close upon an hour gave promise of being a very fine contest was converted into a decidedly unsatisfactory affair, though, as may be imagined, it caused quite executional excitement.

By December 1908, Dinnie lost to American champion Frank Gotch (1877–1917), in Sheffield, England in very quick successive bouts.

From the music halls, when World War I broke out, Dinnie enlisted at Bunbury.

On Saturday 23 January 1915 at Post Office Gardens, Kalgoorlie, Dinnie exhibited his weight-lifting strength by raising a bar bell of 126 pounds (57 kg) above his head with one hand, then throwing it to the other raised hand.

In Saturday, 5 July 1924, aged 48, at a concert and dance evening around the town of Dalwallinu, mid-west WA, Dinnie did some displays of weight lifting with ease, holding 'the onlookers spell bound for several seconds'.

By October 1929, Dinnie stated he was "not satisfied that 'Americanised' wrestling is more effective than the old style which was once so popular here". The catch-as-catch-can and Cumberland wrestling styles held sway until the Americans introduced variations such as Boston crabs, splits and toeholds. He was still offering to wrestle 'any man in the State' in March 1934.

== Accomplishments ==
In his heyday, Dinnie was described as:

- weight – 14 stone 7 pounds (92 kg; 203 lb) (Donald: 15 stone (210 lb; 95 kg))
- chest – 47.5 inches (1.21 m) (Donald: 48 inches (1.2 m))
- biceps – 18 inches (0.46 m) (Donald: 15 inches (0.38 m))
- forearms – 15.5 inches (0.39 m)
- neck – 18 inches (0.46 m)
- thigh – 24 inches (0.61 m) (Donald: 26.5 inches (0.67 m))
- calf – 18.5 inches (0.47 m).

Some awards included:

- Professional wrestling
  - Australian Catch-as-Catch-Can Championship (1 time)
  - Western Australian Heavyweight Championship (2 times)
- Perth Promoting Company
  - South-West Championship (1 time)

== Military service ==
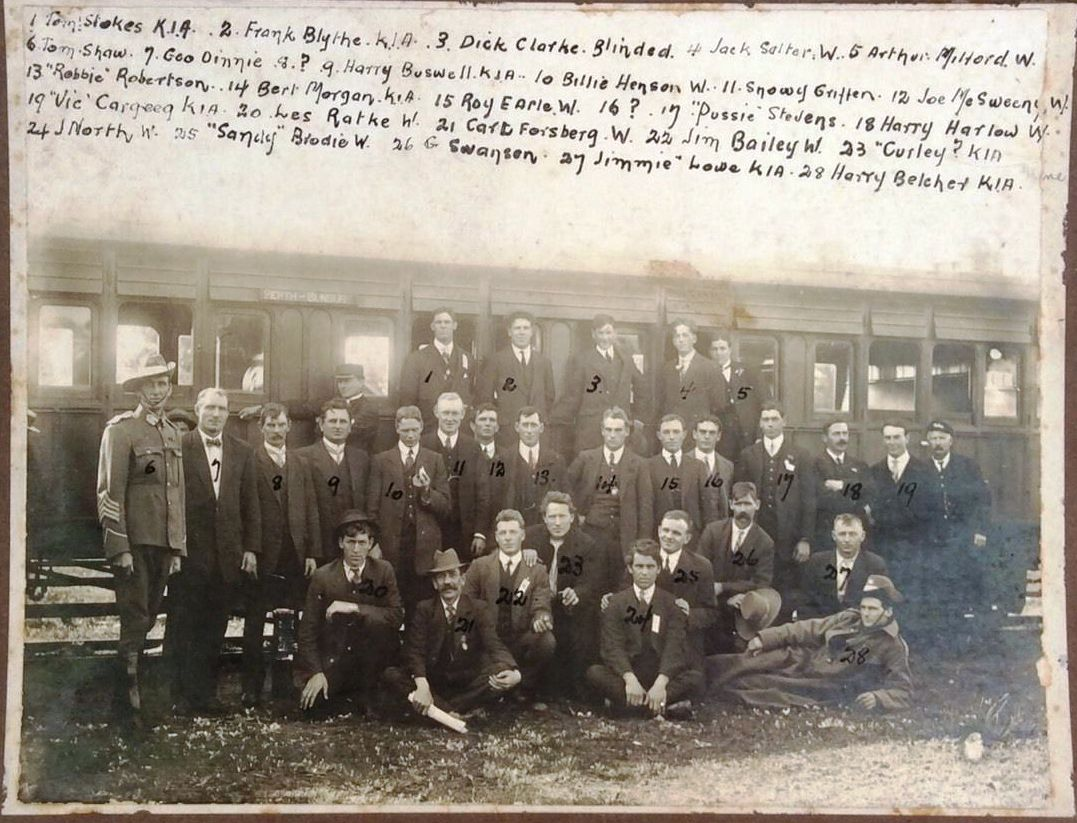
New enlistments at Bunbury railway station, 18 August 1914, Bunbury volunteers selected for the 11th Battalion of the Expeditionary Force for the landing at Gallipoli on 24 April 1915. Photograph provides names and details of service in the Gallipoli campaign.

In August 1914 at the age of having just turned 36, of 593 candidates, Dinnie was one of sixty selected for the Australian Imperial Force at the outbreak of World War I at Midland, Western Australia.

His enlistment papers of Monday, 7 September 1914, indicated his next of kin as Mrs Janet McKenna of Sorn, Ayrshire, Scotland; not married; occupation as horseshoer, having been an apprentice at Wilmot, Sorn, Ayrshire for 4.5 years; four years in the police; of the Presbyterian religion; and a tattoo of a ship on his right wrist. Dinnie was described as:

- height – 5 feet 9 inches (1.75 m) (Donald: 6 feet 1 inch (1.85 m))
- weight – 199 pounds (90 kg) (Donald: 15 stone (210 lb; 95 kg))
- chest – 41 inches (1.0 m) (Donald: 48 inches (1.2 m))
- eyes – blue
- hair – red
- complexion – ruddy.

No further history of his military involvement was recorded on his papers, other than being assigned to the 11th Battalion (Australia) AIF. George Dinnie's military service then appears to be short-lived and possibly embellished:

- A newspaper of 3 September 1914 was indicated in an article that Dinnie, with less than a month's service, was a provost sergeant with the military police, at Bellevue Camp, before they were to depart 'for regions unknown'.
- By 24 September 1914, Dinnie was reported in a military list to be a corporal in 'E' Company.
- In late October 1914, Dinnie was going to 'lift a motor car with six people' at Meekatharra, and perform at Kalgoorlie and the adjoining Boulder in late January 1915, and mid-February 1915.
- On Thursday, 6 May 1915, Dinnie was showing feats of strength and tug-of-war, as part of Hyland's Circus in Kalgoorlie.
- It was stated fourteen years later, a shrapnel-torn arm allegedly delivered Dinnie back to Australia.

The 11th Battalion landed at Gallipoli on 24 April 1915 (the battle at Gallipoli commenced on 25 April 1915, to 9 January 1916). However given Dinnie was known to be performing in January, February, and May 1915 east of Perth, it would suggest he was not undertaking military training, en route to Egypt and the Middle East, or be on the beaches of Gallipoli. His military career would appear to have only lasted from September to October 1914, and any war-sustained injuries highly unlikely.

A July 1916 application for employment to the State War Council, Dinnie indicated his trade was a fireman, his employer being the police, having been born in 1879 and now 37 years of age, having been discharged after two years due to a 'bad leg'. After being discharged at Bunbury, he was now living at 492 Hay Street, Perth. At this point Dinnie stated he was a widower with two dependants (yet single only two years prior). He also underplayed his age by four years (with a real age of about 41). He was 'not in love with the job I have got. If you have a suitable job in hand I will be pleased to take it'.

== Later life ==
After Gallipoli, Dinnie worked in Western Australia's north-west, then embarked on sheep breeding. Keeping in shape, he did win by two falls to one over wrestler Jumbo Johnson at Collie in south-west WA in 1919, but otherwise did little mat work.

By October 1929, aged 54, Dinnie was still breeding sheep and caring for lambs in the Latham District, mid-west WA, and showing a prize dog at the Perth Royal Show. He was still following wrestling in the State, and offered to wrestle others. Now residing at Dowerin in 1933, his canine interest was with kelpies and border collies, 'Don' being his outstanding dog.

Dinnie died on 13 June 1939 at Kalgoorlie, Western Australia. There was no reference to a wife or children.
