= William Haggar =

- Born: Arthur William Haggar; 10 March 1851; Dedham, England
- Died: 4 February 1925 (aged 73); Aberdare, Wales
- Occupation: Film director
- Years active: 1901–1908

William Haggar (10 March 1851 – 4 February 1925) was a British pioneer of the cinema industry. Beginning his career as a travelling entertainer, Haggar, whose large family formed his theatre company, later bought a Bioscope show and earned his money in the fairgrounds of south Wales. In 1902 he began making his own short fictional films, making him one of the earliest directors in Britain. His films were shown worldwide and his short Desperate Poaching Affray is believed to have influenced early narrative drama in American film, especially in chase genre. As a director Haggar is recognised for his use of editing and the depth of staging in his melodramas and crime films.

== Early history ==
Haggar was born in Dedham, Essex, where he was apprenticed as a shipbuilder and later a watchmaker. An accomplished musician, Haggar left home at the age of eighteen and joined a troupe of travelling players, working as a stage carpenter. In 1870 he married Sarah Walton, daughter of Richard Walton proprietor of a travelling theatre. The Waltons were a well-known family of professional actors and pantomimists who had been in the entertaining business for many generations. Shortly after their marriage Haggar and Sarah set up their own company. The couple had eleven children, each born in a different county of England and Wales as their toured their show, each of their children brought up to the profession of the stage. Tragedy struck the family in 1890, when their eldest daughter, Nell, drowned in the River Wye while visiting Chepstow. In 1891 with the birth of their youngest daughter Lillian, the Haggars had eight surviving children, all of whom would later form the regular casts of his films.

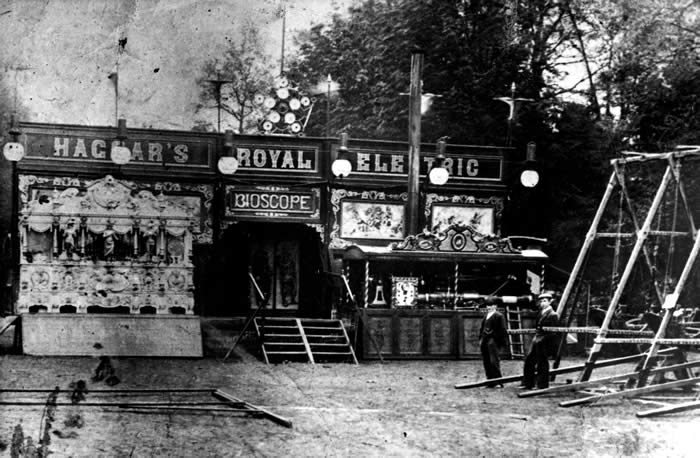
Haggar's travelling 'Bioscope' theatre

Moving the theatre deeper into industrial Wales, Haggar found an audience that brought him an unprecedented level of prosperity. The remote villages of Wales welcomed the travelling theatre, known as 'The Castle Theatre', which by now had a repertoire of over a hundred Victorian melodramas and comedies, to which Haggar later included a portable photographic studio having acquired a plate camera. 'The Castle Theatre', his fit-up theatre and their props were originally drawn by horseback, later he purchased a traction engine to do the job. The company travelled around mid and west Wales to the south Wales valleys, wintering in Aberdare.

In 1897, on a trip to London, Haggar visited one of the early cinemas. Captivated by the show he bought a projector from opticians J. Wrench and Sons, for the price of £80–00, either that same year or in 1898. On 5 April 1898 he made his first public performance of his 'Bioscope' show at Aberavon fair making £15–00 on the first night. The films shown were Turn out of the London Fire Brigade (believed to be the 1897 Lumiére film) and Train emerging from a Tunnel. He continued to take his show around the fairgrounds of South Wales and decided to give 'The Castle Theatre' to his eldest son William, while he focused his energies on promoting 'Haggar's Royal Electric Bioscope' show. The family motto of 'follow the coal' almost lead to Haggar's ruin, when the coal strike of 1898 led to the Welsh miners forgoing the luxury of paid entertainment.

== Films ==
In 1901, Haggar began making his own films, filming the arrival of a train at Burry Port. Although the filming of everyday events was popular for early experimenters of film, Haggar and his family had access to props, costumes and the understanding of how to both act and to entertain the public. In 1902 Haggar began making narrative shorts, and these found distribution from Gaumont, Charles Urban and the Warwick Trading Company. 1902 saw Haggar film The Maid of Cefn Ydfa based on the well known Welsh folk tale. Shot in Maesteg, with his family as the cast, the main filming took little over an hour and a half with seven scenes. The Maid of Cefn Ydfa was shown at the Swansea fair and caused a sensation with people flocking to see it. The film made Haggar's fortune, and was one of the earliest productions to relate to a regional audience.

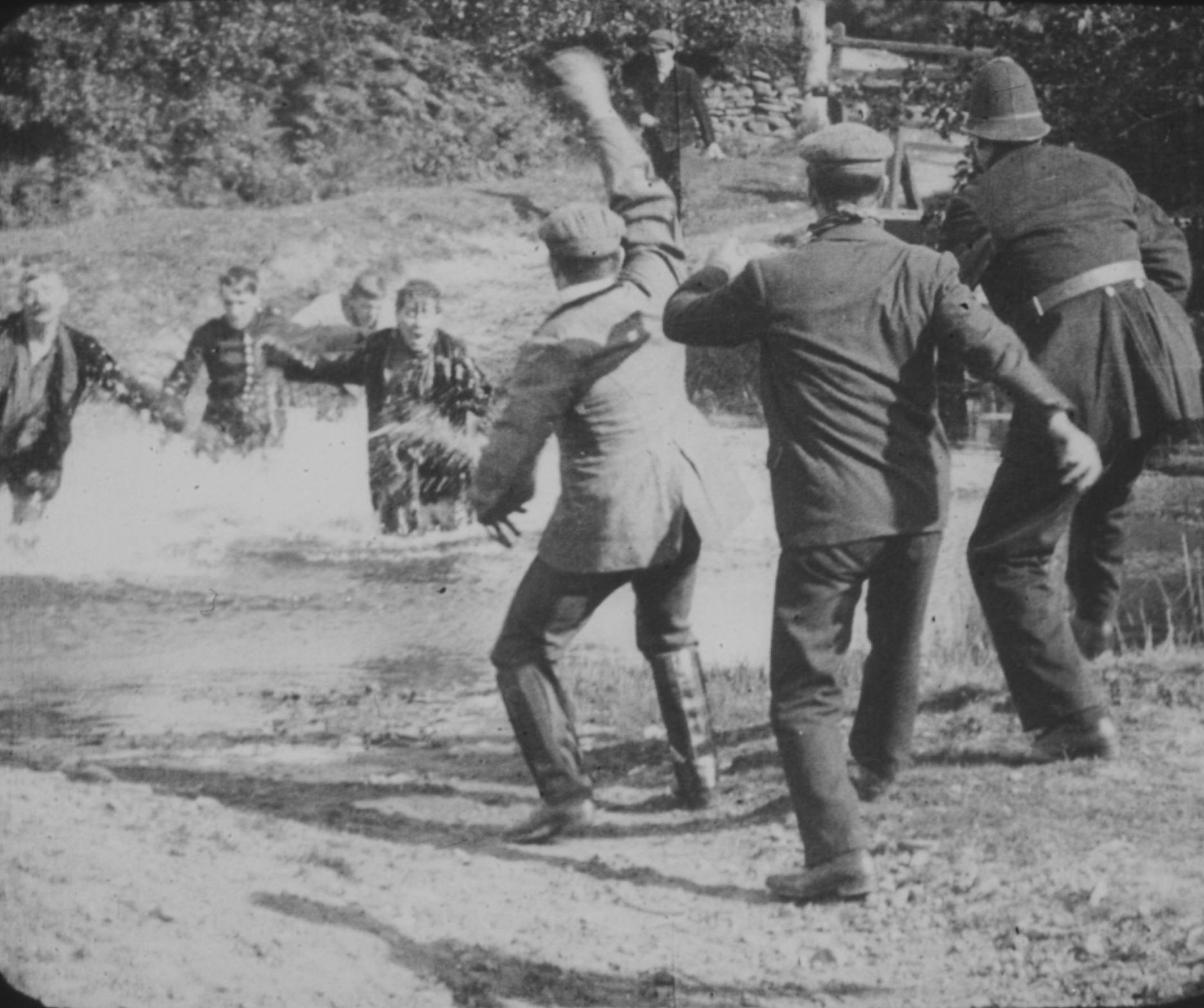
Desperate Poaching Affray (1903)

Amongst Haggar's productions of 1903 was his crime chase film Desperate Poaching Affray. Including Haggers first extant panning shots, the film is now regarded as one of two or three films that influenced early narrative drama in United States cinema, especially in the genre of the chase movie. In the film, poachers are chased by gamekeepers and police officers before being captured. The film includes panning shots, actors running past camera conducted with a sense of urgency and speed. The film was a great success and sold over 480 copies in Europe and America and was widely pirated.

Contemporary accounts describe Haggar's films as considerable achievements given their production conditions. He never used a studio, and many of his shorts were shot near a river and wrapped up in under two hours. His work was held in high esteem by Gaumont who presented him with a film camera, mechanical tripod and supplied him with film stock, all free of charge. Haggar handed over all his negatives to his films in return for retaining the rights in south Wales, and he is believed to have lost out financially in this relationship when the likes of his 1905 The Salmon Poachers – A Midnight Melee sold 480 prints at £6.17s apiece for Gaumont. The Salmon Poachers, a 274ft. film, was praised by the company for its 'magnificent quality throughout' and hailed it as 'the most realistic moonlight effect picture we have ever issued'. Haggar's films were also recognised for their intelligent use of depth of staging and screen edges, while film academic Noël Burch praised Haggar's effective use of off-screen space.

Despite filming during the height of the Welsh religious revival, Haggar's films were often steeped in violence, much to the delight of his audiences. In Desperate Poaching Affray the villains are seen firing guns at their pursuers. While his 1905 melodrama, The Life of Charles Peace, the central character, based on the notorious English burglar and murderer, makes the viewer complicit in his crimes by approaching the camera and thumbing his nose after sending a police officer in the wrong direction. The film starred much of Haggars family with his son Walter taking the central character role, while his wife played Peace's mother.

In total, Haggar made more than 30 documented films, though only four are known to exist today: Desperate Poaching Affray, The Life of Charles Peace, The Sheepstealer (1908) and Revenge! (1904). The Sheepstealer was previously lost, and was rediscovered in the 1970s in the collection of the early film educator Abbé Joseph Joye in Switzerland; and restored by the British Film Institute in the 1990s. Revenge! was rediscovered in 2007 in the collection of the US Library of Congress, and is considered one of his most violent films.

== Later life ==
After the death of his wife Sarah in 1909, he settled permanently in Aberdare, and in 1910 he opened William Haggars Coliseum, later renamed Haggar's Electric Palace, on a permanent pitch at Market Yard. This was followed by cinemas in Llanelli, Pontardulais, Neath, Mountain Ash and Pembroke. In 1912 he remarried, to Mary Davies, daughter of Jenkin Davies, the proprietor of the 'Bird in Hand Inn' in Aberdare. He and Mary had a house built in Abernant, which they called 'Kinema House'. He was elected to the Merthyr Board of Guardians of the Poor in 1913 and the next year he became a councillor to Aberdare Urban District Council.

With a film career of over 25 years behind him Haggar died on 4 February 1925 at 'Maer-yr-haf' in Elm Grove, Aberdare, the home of his son Walter.

== Filmography ==
- The Maniac's Gulillotine (1902)
- Duel scene from The Two Orphans (1902)
- The Wild Man of Borneo (1902)
- True as Steel (1902)
- The Maid of Cefn Ydfa (1902)
- Weary Willie and Tired Tim – The Gunpowder Plot (1903)
- Mirthful Mary – a Case for the Blacklist (1903)
- Weary Willie and Tired Tim turn Barbers (1903)
- Desperate Poaching Affray (1903)
- Weary Willie and Tired Tim – A Dead Shot (1903)
- The Tramp and the Washerwoman (1903)
- The Tramp and the Baby's Bottle (1903)
- A Dash for Liberty (or The Convict's Escape and Capture) (1903)
- Whitewashing the Policeman (1904)
- Mirthful Mary in the Dock (1904)
- The Sign of the Cross (1904)
- The Bather's Revenge (1904)
- Brutality Rewarded (1904)
- The Meddling Policeman (1904)
- Flynn's Birthday Celebration (1904)
- The Biter Bitten (1904)
- Snowballing (1904)
- The Rival Painters (1905)
- The Squire's Daughter (1905)
- The Life of Charles Peace (1905)
- DTs or the Effects of Drink (1905)
- Fun at the Waxworks (1905)
- Bathing not Allowed (1905)
- A Boating Incident (1905)
- Two's Company Three's None (1905)
- The Salmon Poachers – A Midnight Melee (1905)
- Mary is Dry (1905)
- A Message from the Sea (1905)
- Pongo, the Man Monkey (1906)
- Desperate Footpads (1907)
- The Red Barn Trosedd ( neu Maria Martin) (1908)
- The Dumb Man of Manchester (1908)
- The Maid of Cefn Ydfa ( ail-gynhyrchiad ) (1908)

== Bibliography ==
- Davies, John; Jenkins, Nigel; Menna, Baines; Lynch, Peredur I., eds. (2008). The Welsh Academy Encyclopaedia of Wales. Cardiff: University of Wales Press. ISBN 978-0-7083-1953-6.
- Berry, David (1996). Wales and Cinema, The First Hundred Years. Cardiff: University of Wales Press. ISBN 0-7083-1370-1.
