= Bugeilio'r Gwenith Gwyn =

"Bugeilio'r Gwenith Gwyn" (English: Watching the White Wheat) is an 18th-century traditional Welsh love song.

Opening of "Bugeilio'r Gwenith Gwyn"
Sung by Bryn Williams

The song was collected from the oral tradition in the 1830s and was first published in 1844 by the Welsh musician and folklorist Maria Jane Williams in her collection Ancient National Airs of Gwent and Morganwg. The song has been linked, rather vaguely, to the popular story about a rich heiress, Ann Thomas (1704-27) — the so-called ‘Maid of Cefn Ydfa’, from the parish of Llangynwyd in central Glamorgan, and the somewhat nebulous poet, Wil Hopcyn (1700-41), to whom the song is attributed. However, the song itself makes no explicit reference to the tale, and the version presented here actually refers to "Gwen" rather than to "Ann".

According to Professor E. Wyn James, the history of the song is complex. He conjectures that it is probably a medley of folk stanzas from a number of sources, ‘improved’ by Taliesin Williams (1787-1847) and extended with a verse composed by his father, ‘Iolo Morganwg’ (Edward Williams, 1747-1826) "that wayward genius, who — under the influence of the love of his native Glamorgan, not to mention laudanum — rewrote the history of Welsh scholarship and literature with Glamorgan very much centre stage."

== Lyrics ==
There are several versions of the lyrics with minor variations in the words and additional verses. A modern version is:

== Words with English translation ==
Mi sydd fachgen ifanc ffôl
Yn byw yn ôl fy ffansi,
Myfi'n bugeilio'r gwenith gwyn,
Ac arall yn ei fedi.
Pam na ddeui ar fy ôl,
Ryw ddydd ar ôl ei gilydd?
Gwaith 'rwy'n dy weld, y feinir fach,
Yn lanach, lanach beunydd.

Glanach, glanach wyt bob dydd,
Neu fi sy'am fydd yn ffolach;
Er mwyn y Gŵr a wnaeth dy wedd
Dod im' drugaredd bellach.
Cwnn dy ben, gwel acw draw,
Rho imi'th law wen dirion;
Gwaith yn dy fynwes bert ei thro
Mae allwedd clo fy nghalon.

Codais heddiw gyda'r wawr,
Gan frysio'n fawr fy lludded,
Fel cawn gusanu llun dy droed
Fu 'rhyd y coed yn cerdded;
Cwn fy mhen o'r galar maith
Â serchus iaith gwarineb,
Gwaith mwy na'r byd i'r mab a'th gâr
Yw golwg ar dy wyneb.

Tra fo dŵr y môr yn hallt,
A thra fo 'ngwallt yn tyfu,
A thra fo calon dan fy mron
Mi fyddai'n ffyddlon iti;
Dywed imi'r gwir heb gêl,
A rho dan sêl d'atebion,
P'un ai myfi ai arall, Gwen,
Sydd orau gan dy galon.

Translation:

I am a foolish young boy
Living according to my fancy,
It is I watching over the white wheat,
And another reaps it.
Why do you not come after me,
Some day after another?
Because I see you, little maiden,
More and more beautiful every day.

More and more beautiful are you each day,
Or I who will be more foolish;
For the sake of Him who made your looks
Take pity on me at last.
Raise your head, see over there,
Give me your pretty white hand;
Because in your lovely breast
Is the key to the lock of my heart.

I rose today with the dawn,
Hastening greatly my fatigue,
So that I should be able to kiss your footsteps,
Which have walked through the wood;
Raise my head from the long sadness
With the affectionate language of civility,
Because more than the world to the boy who is your friend
Is looking on your face.

While the water of the sea is salt,
And while my hair is growing,
And while there is a heart in my breast
I shall be faithful to you;
Tell me the truth in secret
And give your answer under seal,
Whether it is myself or another, Gwen,
Whom your heart prefers.

Common variations include using the more literary ieuanc in place of ifanc (meaning young) in the first verse (as in the clip above). Also, gwna (make or do) is often used in place of dod (come) in the second verse, and the soft mutation of bo to fo is often omitted following tra in the fourth verse.

== Tune ==
=== First published version ===
The melody and words first published by Maria Jane Williams in 1844:

=== Modern version ===
A modern version of the tune is:
