= Frank Mottershaw =

English cinema director

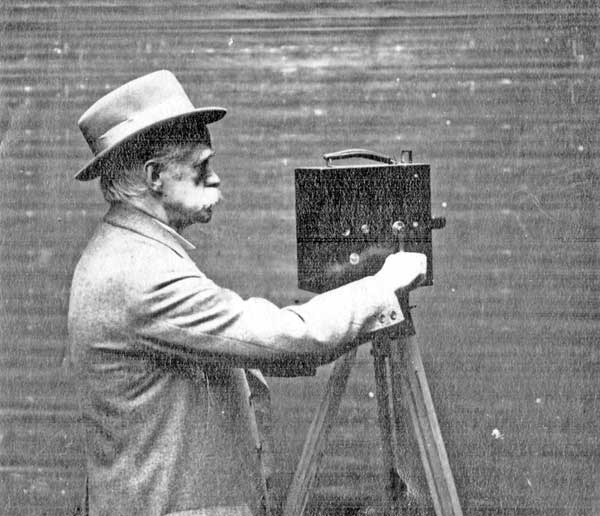
Frank Mottershaw (film pioneer)

Frank Mottershaw (1850–1932) (often confused with his second son, Frank Storm Mottershaw, 1881–1931) was an early English cinema director based in Sheffield, Yorkshire. His films, A Daring Daylight Burglary and The Robbery of the Mail Coach (featuring a protagonist based on Jack Sheppard, the infamous 18th-century English highwayman), made in April and September 1903, are regarded as highly influential on the development of Edwin Porter’s paradigmatic "chase film" The Great Train Robbery of December 1903, and often claimed as the prototype of the action film. The uniqueness of Mottershaw's A Daring Daylight Burglary is seen in the way it tracks a single action through changing locations. Henry Jasper Redfern and Mottershaw made the first motion pictures filmed outdoors in Sheffield.

In 1900 Mottershaw formed the Sheffield Photo Company, which by 1905 was one of the leading film companies in the country.

Mottershaw made most of his company's films with his son Frank Storm Mottershaw (sometimes known as Frank S. Mottershaw Jr.), who shot and directed documentary film The Coronation of Peter I of Serbia and a Ride Through Serbia, Novi-Bazaar, Montenegro and Dalmatia, travelling to the Balkans in 1904 with Serbian honorary consul in Britain, Arnold Muir Wilson. His younger son, John Arthur Mothershaw (1883–1905) was actor and cameraman in some of the films.

== Filmography ==
- 1903 A Daring Daylight Burglary (1903)
- 1903 Robbery of the Mail Coach (1903)
- 1903 The Convict's Escape from Prison (1903)
- 1904 A Ride on the Kinver Light Railway (1904)
- 1904 The Coronation of King Peter the First (1904) - film made by his son Frank Storm Mottershaw
- 1904 Attack on a Japanese Convoy (1904)
- 1904 A Dash with the Despatch (1904)
- 1904 The Tramp's Duck Hunt (1904)
- 1904 The Market Woman's Mishap (1904)
- 1904 A Cycle Teacher's Experiences (1904)
- 1904 The Coiners (1904)
- 1904 The Bobby's Downfall (1904)
- 1904 Late for Work (1904)
- 1904 Boys Will Be Boys (1904)
- 1904 Fly Catchers (1904)
- 1904 Bertie's Courtship (1904)
- 1904 The Tramps and the Washerwoman (1904)
- 1904 A Picnic Disturbed (1904)
- 1904 That Awful Donkey (1904)
- 1905 A Soldier's Romance (1905)
- 1905 An Eccentric Burglary (1905)
- 1905 The Masher and the Nursemaid (1905)
- 1905 Lazy Workmen (1905)
- 1905 A Fireman's Story (1905)
- 1905 The Shoplifter (1905)
- 1905 The Demon Motorist (1905)
- 1905 A Man Although a Thief (1905)
- 1905 Mixed Babies (1905)
- 1905 The Life of Charles Peace (1905)
- 1906 Our Boyhood Days (1906)
- 1906 Lost in the Snow (1906)
- 1906 The Eccentric Thief (1906)
- 1906 That Terrible Dog (1906)
- 1906 Our Seaside Holiday (1906)
- 1906 His First Silk Hat (1906)
- 1906 After the Club (1906)
- 1907 The Romany's Revenge (1907)
- 1907 Johnny's Rim (1907)
- 1907 Willie's Dream (1907)
- 1907 The Blackmailer (1907)
- 1907 His Cheap Watch (1907)
- 1908 That Nasty Sticky Stuff (1908)
