= Latham, Western Australia =

Town in Western Australia, Australia

Latham
- Town
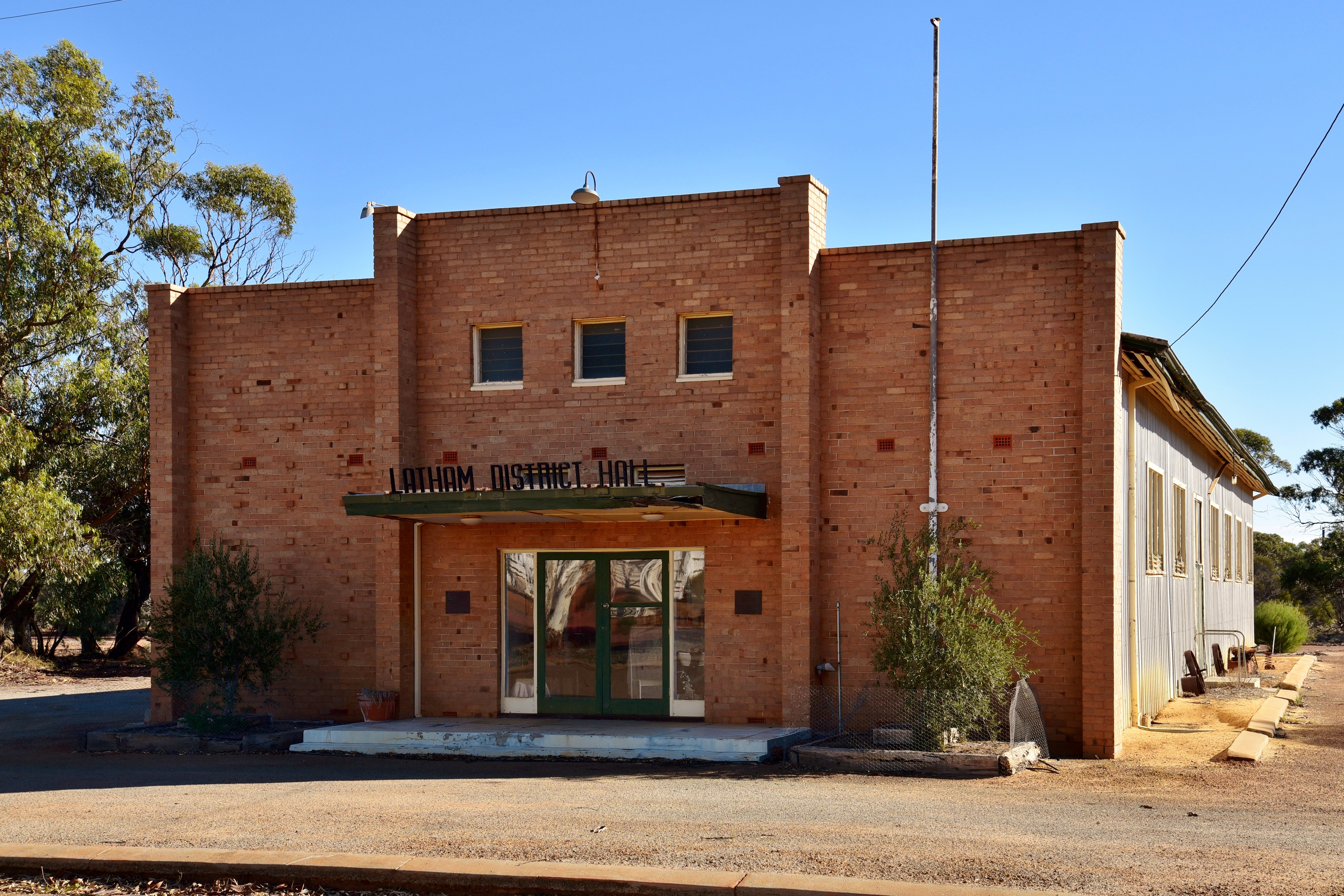
- Latham District Hall, 2018

- Coordinates: 29°45′S 116°27′E
- Country: Australia
- State: Western Australia
- LGA(s): Shire of Perenjori
- Location: 311 km (193 mi) north north east of Perth; 55 km (34 mi) east of Carnamah; 107 km (66 mi) north west of Moora
- Established: 1917

Government
  - State electorate(s): Moore
  - Federal division(s): Durack

Area
  - Total: 662.1 km^{2} (255.6 sq mi)
- Elevation: 291 m (955 ft)

Population
  - Total(s): 61 (SAL 2021)
- Postcode: 6616

Latham is a small town in the Mid West region of Western Australia. It is named after Latham Rock, a large granite rock close to the townsite. The rock was named for an early pastoralist who established a watering place for stock being droved through the area.

When construction of the railway line from Wongan Hills to Mullewa was planned in 1913, the Public Works department decided the area would be suitable as a railway station and a townsite. The railway opened for service in 1915 and the townsite was gazetted in 1917.

The bulk wheat bin was opened in November 1936.

The surrounding areas produce wheat and other cereal crops. The town is a receival site for Cooperative Bulk Handling.

Champion wrestler George Dinnie (1875–1939) was a resident of Latham in the 1920s.
