= A Daring Daylight Burglary =

1903 British film by Frank Mottershaw

- also known as: A Daring Daylight Robbery
- Directed by: Frank Mottershaw
- Produced by: Frank Mottershaw
- Production company: Sheffield Photo Company
- Distributed by: American Mutoscope and Biograph Co. (U.S.); Kleine Optical Co. (U.S.); Edison Mfg. Co. (U.S.)
- Release date: 1903
- Country: United Kingdom
- Language: Silent

A Daring Daylight Burglary (also known as A Daring Daylight Robbery) is a 1903 British short silent film directed by Frank Mottershaw. The film was produced by the Sheffield Photo Company, and features members from the Sheffield Fire Brigade as part of the cast. Mottershaw also employed actors from local music halls and paid them ten shillings for a day's work.

Techniques used in Edwin S. Porter's The Great Train Robbery (considered to be the first American-made Western film), released later the same year, were inspired by those used in Mottershaw's film.

== Synopsis ==
A burglar breaks into a country house after scaling the garden wall. He is spotted by a boy who runs to alert the police. Two policemen arrive and climb the wall. After a struggle with one of the policemen, the burglar throws him off the roof. An ambulance arrives and takes away the injured policeman. Meanwhile, the burglar escapes and is chased by the other policeman across the countryside, but escapes on a train. The police wire ahead and catch him at the next station.

== Cast ==
- Sheffield Fire Brigade
- Sheffield locals
