= Professional wrestling in New Zealand =

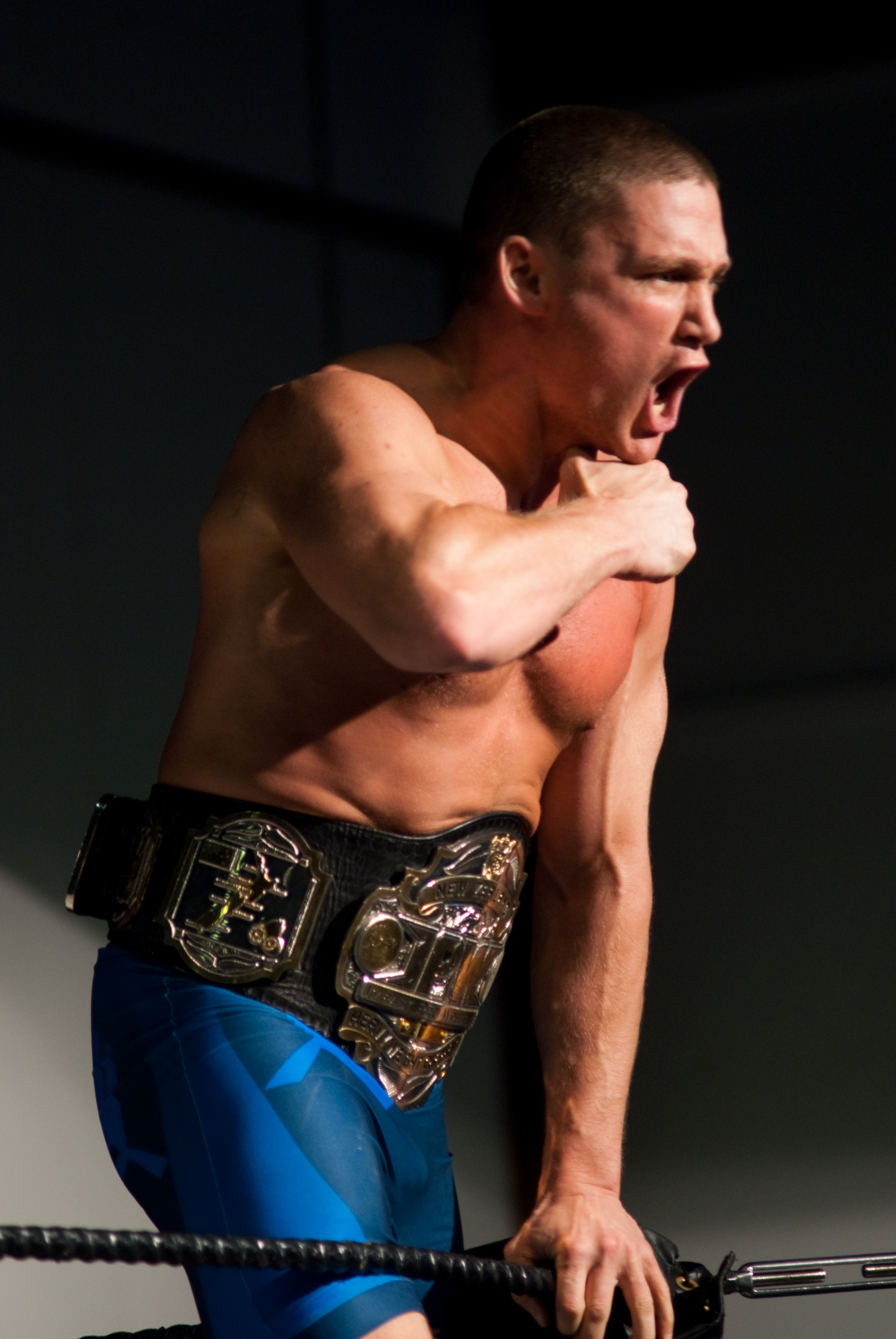
A wrestler competing in Impact Pro Wrestling, an Auckland-based independent wrestling promotion

Professional wrestling in New Zealand has been promoted in the country from the early 20th century. In 1919, Gisborne Katene became the first national heavyweight champion, though the title was not recognised by the National Wrestling Association until 1925, and promoter Walter Miller began running events under the Dominion Wrestling Union banner ten years later.

It was not until the years following the Second World War that professional wrestling enjoyed its first golden age. Pat O'Connor, a one-time NWA and AWA World Heavyweight Champion, was one of the earliest stars of that era. During the 1960s and 1970s, other wrestlers from New Zealand also travelled to the United States, where they enjoyed similar success in the National Wrestling Alliance and the World Wide Wrestling Federation. American wrestlers frequently toured New Zealand during this period and were well received by the public. The NWA World Heavyweight Championship was also defended several times in the country; in 1984 Ric Flair won the title from Harley Race in Wellington and Jeff Jarrett defeated Sting in Auckland to unify the title with Australia's WWA World Heavyweight Championship in 2003.

As in the United Kingdom, its popularity was helped through a weekly television show, On the Mat, that showcased many wrestlers from around the world in the 1970s and early 1980s. Although professional wrestling in New Zealand declined following the 1980s wrestling boom, it still maintained a presence in the industry. Retired wrestler and promoter Steve Rickard briefly served as President of the NWA during the mid-1990s. Jason Conlan, a New Zealand-born cartoonist known as Pro Wrestling Illustrated's "Mr. J", began drawing a popular comic strip for the publication in 1995. Sharon Mazer of Auckland University of Technology wrote a series of articles on professional wrestling and published Professional Wrestling: Sport and Spectacle in 1998. Since 2003, its popularity has returned following the emergence of several independent promotions, and with it the reappearance of televised wrestling, bringing professional wrestling back into the popular culture of New Zealand.

== History ==
=== Early years (1900–1920s) ===
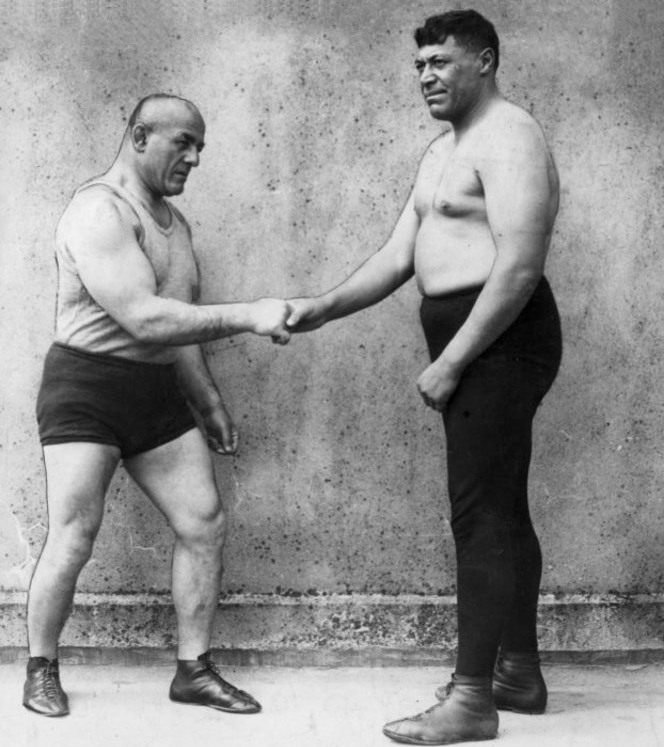
Ike Robin and Stanislaus Zbyszko shake hands before their 1926 bout in Auckland.

Though wrestling bouts had been held as early as the 1860s, modern professional wrestling would not take shape until around the turn of the 20th century. Georg Hackenschmidt toured the country performing against local wrestlers in exhibition bouts in 1905 and 1910. In 1919, Gisborne Katene defeated Frank Findlay for the NWA New Zealand Heavyweight Championship, though it became vacant shortly afterwards. The first officially recognised champion was Maori wrestler Ike Robin who won the title in Auckland on 17 March 1925, and held it until his retirement the following year; the title continued to be defended for almost 70 years.

Prior to his retirement, Robin and Stanislaus Zbyszko, a one-time World Heavyweight Champion, faced each other in a three-match series at the Auckland Town Hall in 1926. One of their matches lasted for several hours before ending in a time limit draw which, according to the New Zealand Railways Magazine, had "gone on for many weary hours and when midnight Saturday chimed and Sunday commenced the match had to cease". Despite the vast geographic distances, professional wrestling as practiced in the South Pacific region followed along the same lines as professional wrestling in Canada and the United States.

=== Association with the NWA (1930s–1940s) ===
In 1929, the country's first professional wrestling promotion, the Dominion Wrestling Union, was established. It was originally under the control of the New Zealand Wrestling Union, a governing body which oversaw both amateur and professional wrestling, until hiring American-born promoter Walter Miller in 1935. Miller, who had been in the wrestling business since 1914, was able to bring in some of the top stars in the US throughout the 1930s and 1940s. In 1937, the promotion featured Dr. Gordon McKenzie, Tom Meade, Don Mclntyre, Hal Rumberg, Ray Richards, Sam Stein, Jack Forsgren, John Spellman, Matros Kirilenko, King Kong Cox, Chief Little Wolf, Frank Marshall, Rusty Wescoatt, Glen Wade, Joe Woods, Frank Judson, Don Noland, Vie Christy, Francis Fouche and Ed "Strangler" Lewis. The American wrestlers, who then travelled by boat, spent the three-week trip in training prior to their arrival. Canadian wrestler George Walker claimed the New Zealand-version of the British Empire/Commonwealth Heavyweight Championship upon his arrival in New Zealand in 1929. Former Canadian Olympian Earl McCready was recognised as champion when Walker left to compete for a rival promotion in 1935, and legitimised his claim to the title by defeating Walker on 9 November 1937; his second and last reign lasted from 1940 to 1953. Other stand-out stars included Dean Detton, Ken Kenneth, John Kattan and African-American wrestler Jack Claybourne.

It was Lofty Blomfield, however, who was arguably New Zealand's most popular wrestler of the period. He was the first New Zealand Amateur Heavyweight Wrestling Champion in 1931 and the first undisputed New Zealand Heavyweight Champion seven years later. During the late-1930s, Blomfield was to have met NWA World Heavyweight Champion Bronko Nagurski in a first-ever "champion vs. champion" match. Miller negotiated with NWA promoters Toots Mondt, Lou Daro and Tony Stecher for Nagurski to travel to New Zealand in exchange for the largest guarantee ever offered a boxer or wrestler in the Southern Hemisphere. It was believed at the time that the event would attract more than 40,000 people. Though Nagurski ultimately cancelled the trip at the last minute, Blomfield followed the world champion to Canada where the two wrestled to a time limit draw in Vancouver on 17 March 1938. Blomfield was the first New Zealander to challenge for the NWA World title. In October of that year, he won a tournament to become the undisputed New Zealand Heavyweight Champion. Blomfield held the title for over a decade until his retirement on 7 June 1949. Throughout his career, Blomfield vigorously defended professional wrestling and denied frequent charges that matches were rigged. Four decades later, Blomfield became the first wrestler to be inducted into the New Zealand Sports Hall of Fame. To date he remains the only wrestler, amateur or professional, to be an inductee.

The same year of Blomfield's retirement, a number of New Zealand-born wrestlers left for Europe where they became major stars on the continent during the next few years. Ernie "Kiwi" Kingston, a student of Olympic wrestler Anton Koolmann, was considered one of the best heavyweights in Europe and a main rival of British Heavyweight Champion Bert Assirati. A few were especially popular in the United Kingdom such as Ray Clarke, who also had a notable rivalry with Assirati, Bob Russell and Russ Bishop. While many of these men were regarded as some of the most formidable wrestlers during the late 1940s and 1950s, they most often remained unknown in their native country.

=== Golden Age (1950s–1970s) ===
After the end of World War II, amateur and professional wrestling enjoyed widespread popularity in New Zealand popular culture. Part of this of was due to its radio broadcasts from live events both prior to and after the war. By 1956, professional wrestling had surpassed the then-national sport of rugby in popularity and was the most popular spectator sport in New Zealand with the exception of horse racing. The Wellington Town Hall Concert Chamber was one of the more popular postwar venues for wrestling events. Within a few years, New Zealand champions were travelling oversees as far as Western Canada.

Pat O'Connor, a champion amateur wrestler who had competed at the Pan American and the British Empire Games, was discovered by visiting American wrestlers Joe Pazandak and Butch Levy and taken back to Minneapolis, Minnesota, where he eventually became a major star in the National Wrestling Alliance and the American Wrestling Association. On 9 January 1959, O'Connor defeated Dick Hutton in St. Louis, Missouri to become the first wrestler from New Zealand to win the NWA World Heavyweight Championship. Over the next 20 years, many other wrestlers from New Zealand became big name stars in the United States. Abe Jacobs was among the first to follow O'Connor to the US and later challenged him for the NWA World title in New York. This was the first time two New Zealanders fought for a world heavyweight championship, and on foreign soil.

In 1959, Miller died and was succeeded by Steve Rickard who ran the Dominion Wrestling Union for two years until starting All Star Pro-Wrestling in 1962. Fellow wrestler John da Silva also began a rival promotion, Central Wrestling Association, around this time but it eventually closed in the early 1970s. After Miller's death, regular appearances by American wrestlers declined considerably, though a few still managed to arrive each year. In that time, a number of local stars were developed in New Zealand including Tony Garea, Peter Maivia, Al Hobman, and The Sheepherders. From other parts of the world came Australian wrestlers Ron Miller and Larry O'Day of World Championship Wrestling, Robert Bruce from Scotland, Canadians Gordon Nelson and George Gordienko, and André the Giant. South Pacific Wrestling, another small promotion started by referee Ernie Pinches, produced Johnny Garcia and Onno Boelee during the 1970s.

By the end of the decade, Rickard and Australian wrestling promoter Jim Barnett managed to attract foreign stars back to the Pacific. American wrestlers frequently toured New Zealand as well and were well received by the public. In 1972, Big Bad John, Bulldog Brower, Les Wolff, King Curtis Iaukea, Spiros Arion, Mark Lewin, Thunderbolt Patterson, Sweet Daddy Siki, Tarzan Tyler, Dewey Robertson and Haystacks Calhoun all toured New Zealand. Calhoun and his wife in particular made numerous television appearances, press interviews and visited schools. The debut of Rickard's On the Mat during this period, a counterpart of Britain's World of Sport, replaced the once popular radio broadcasts and showcased many New Zealand and international stars including Pat Barrett, The Destroyer, Man Mountain Link, Les Thornton, Leo Burke, Ripper Collins, Rick Martel, Tiger Jeet Singh, Ali Vizeri, Abdullah the Butcher, and Siva Afi. Afi's tournament victory over John DaSilva in 1978 marked the first time a Samoan wrestler won a New Zealand championship on New Zealand television, and the first to hold the national title since 1964; An official member of the NWA since 1972, the NWA World title was also defended in Rickard's promotion. Peter Maivia nearly won the NWA World title from then-champion Harley Race in 1979. This title changed hands between Ric Flair and Harley Race in Wellington, New Zealand and Geylang, Singapore in 1984 but these would not be acknowledged by the NWA for several years.

While Peter Maivia, Tony Garea and The Sheepherders left for the US in the 1970s, stars from the National Wrestling Alliance and the World Wide Wrestling Federation regularly toured the country including Don Muraco, Toru Tanaka, Mr. Fuji and Rocky Johnson. New Zealand was among the places future Dwayne "The Rock" Johnson lived in with his father Rocky while growing up. Japanese wrestlers too, such as Giant Baba, the Great Togo and midget wrestler Little Tokyo, also visited New Zealand.

=== Decline (1980s–1990s) ===
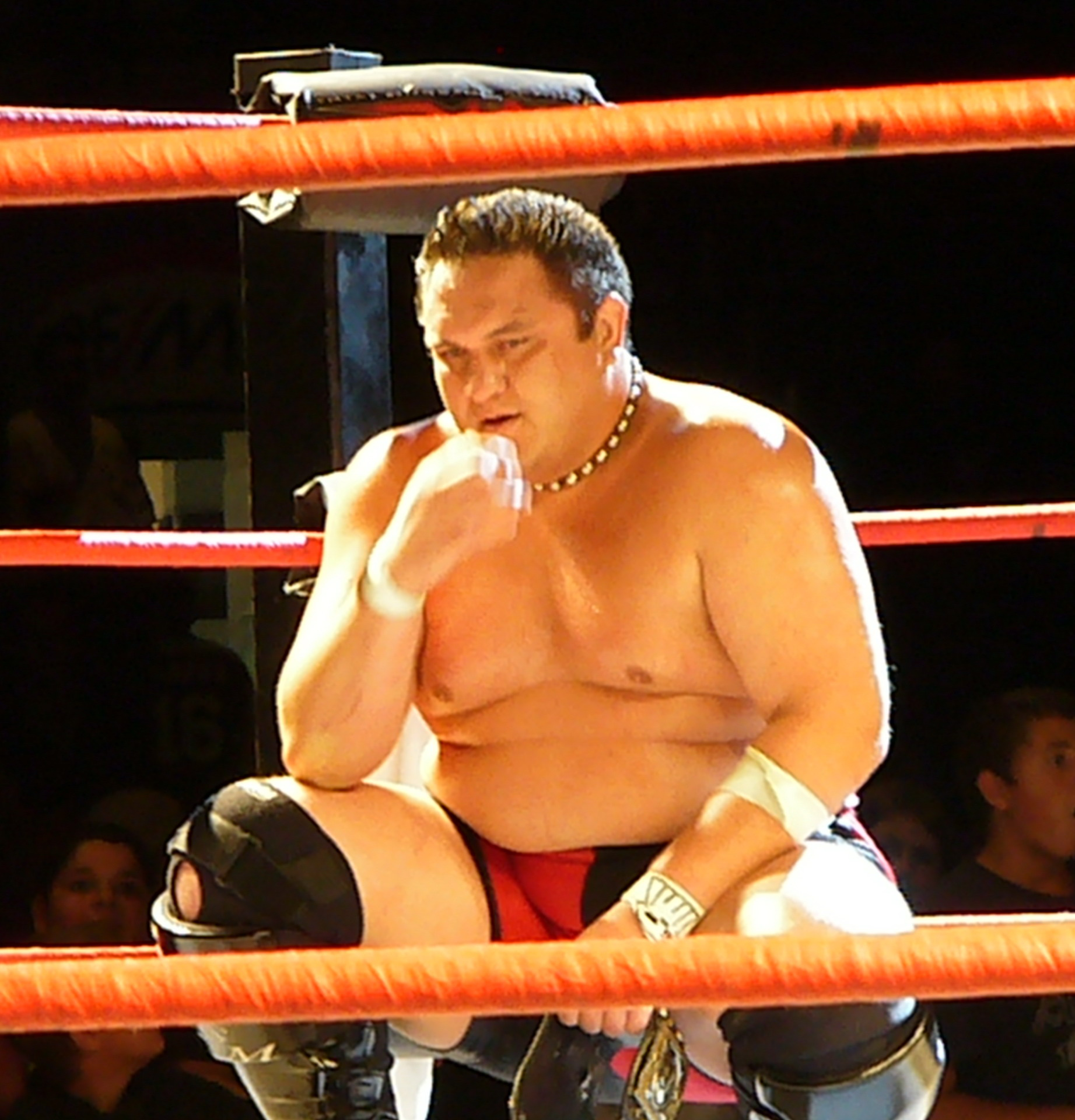
Samoa Joe has been interviewed by the NZPWI, a website covering New Zealand wrestling.

Though the retirements of O'Connor and Garea left a void, talents such as Ox Baker, Tor Kamata, Al Perez, Rip Morgan, Samoan Joe, Johnny Garcia, Bruno Bekkar and A.J. Freely remained in New Zealand during the 1980s and early 1990s. Likewise, wrestlers from the World Wrestling Federation often toured New Zealand and Australia such as The Bushwhackers (formerly The Sheepherders) and Lanny Poffo. These stars continued to be seen in New Zealand via On the Mat until the early 1980s.

During the wrestling boom of the mid-late 1980s, and particularly inspired by the Superstars of Wrestling TV show, a Wellington-based promotion run by veterans including Bruno Bekkar, Al Hobman, Bob "the Hog" Crozier and others staged a number of wrestling events throughout Wellington and the lower North Island.

As American wrestling went into a slump following the wrestling boom of the 1980s, All Star Pro-Wrestling closed in the 1990s, after 30 years. A few small independent promotions sprang up after All-Star's close, specifically the Arena Wrestling Alliance (1990), Wai-Kato Wrestling Association (1991–1992) and the International Wrestling Federation (1993), though these were all short-lived. By 1998, professional wrestling in New Zealand was all but non-existent. However, many New Zealand wrestlers and personalities maintained a strong presence in the industry. Steve Rickard served as President of the NWA from 1995 to 1996. New Zealand-born cartoonist Jason Conlan, also known as Pro Wrestling Illustrated's "Mr. J", began drawing a monthly comic strip for the publication around this time. Sharon Mazer, associate professor of Theatre & Performance Studies at Auckland University of Technology, wrote a series of articles on professional wrestling focused on what was then the WWF and research done at the Unpredictable Johnny Rodz School of Professional Wrestling (Gleason's Gym, Brooklyn). In 1998, she wrote Professional Wrestling: Sport and Spectacle. Mazer also contributed to author Nicholas Sammond's Steel Chair to the Head: The Pleasure and Pain of Professional Wrestling (2005). Children's science fiction author Debbie Renner claimed to have once competed under the name "Tasmanian Devil" prior to becoming a full-time writer. In celebration of the coming Millennium, Abe Jacobs was featured on a special commemorative edition of the New Zealand ten-dollar note by the Chatham Islands Note Corporation.

The New Zealand Pro Wrestling Informer (NZPWI), an online resource for New Zealand professional wrestling, appeared in 1999, and was one of the earliest professional wrestling-related websites to appear on the Internet. Between 2003 and 2008, it interviewed numerous wrestlers from Total Nonstop Action Wrestling and World Wrestling Entertainment. Among those included retired foreign wrestlers who had previously competed in New Zealand as well as younger upcoming wrestlers such as Samoa Joe and Bobby Lashley.

=== 21st century (2000s–) ===
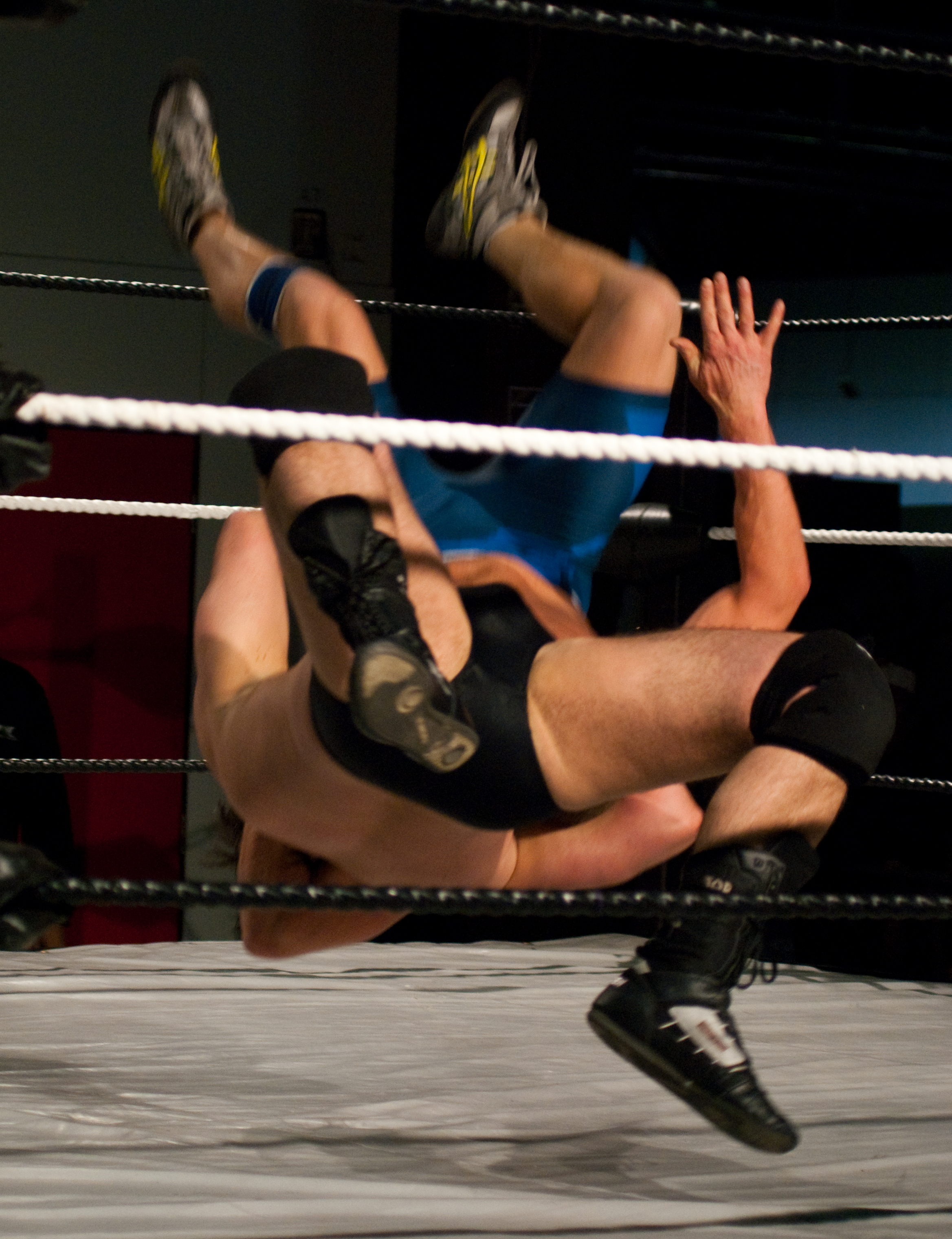
A match at an IPW event in Auckland

On 25 May 2003, Auckland hosted a "champion vs. champion" match, in which NWA World Heavyweight Champion Jeff Jarrett defeated Sting to unify Australia's WWA World Heavyweight Championship. Mania Pro Wrestling, the first wrestling promotion since the close of Rickard's All Star Pro-Wrestling, was established in Auckland mid-2000, following the success Mania Female Fighting Academy had enjoyed with their blend of stunt fighting and mat wrestling. Wellington promoter and former professional wrestler Martin Stirling took an interest in the return of the artform, and established Wellington Pro Wrestling in October 2003. Early 2003 in Auckland the scene changed, as the collective of wrestlers who made up Mania Pro Wrestling, after a disagreement over the running of the company, established their own brand away from the Fighting Academy, known now as Impact Pro Wrestling. In January 2005, Stirling changed his promotions title to New Zealand Wide Pro Wrestling.

WWE held their first live event tour in New Zealand on 4 March 2006, at the Westpac Stadium. This was the WWE Smackdown Road to WrestleMania 22 Tour, which featured a main event triple threat match between Kurt Angle, Undertaker and Mark Henry for the World Heavyweight Championship.

Competition emerged in the New Zealand wrestling industry during May 2006 in Wellington, when Rip Morgan split from Stirling's company and Kiwi Pro Wrestling was established, made up of a number of Stirling's former stars. These new promotions also brought back televised wrestling, which had been absent since the days of Rickard's On the Mat, with the debut of IPW Ignition and KPW's Off the Ropes.

The decade saw cooperation between New Zealand and Australian promoters as well. In 2007, Peter Ball's Major Impact Wrestling merged with New Zealand's Impact Pro Wrestling to form a sister promotion in Australia, Impact Pro Wrestling Australia. That same year, Dominic Ferrari's New Aussie Wrestling took part in an inter-promotional "Australia vs. New Zealand" supercard with Kiwi Pro Wrestling. In 2008, the Australasian Wrestling Federation made two trips to New Zealand, performing using their own talent and members of New Zealand Wide Pro Wrestling.

In late 2022, New Japan Pro-Wrestling announced NJPW Tamashii, a series of events that would be held in Australia and New Zealand. The Tamashii brand was officially launched in September, with the first show taking place on 11 November in Christchurch.

== WWE in New Zealand ==
Date	Name	Brand	Venue	City	Main event
March 4, 2006	WWE SmackDown Road to WrestleMania 22 Tour	SmackDown	Westpac Stadium	Wellington	Kurt Angle vs. Mark Henry vs. The Undertaker for the World Heavyweight Championship
February 23, 2007	WWE SmackDown Road to WrestleMania 23 Tour	SmackDown & ECW	Westpac Centre	Christchurch	Batista vs. Mr. Kennedy for the World Heavyweight Championship
February 24, 2007	WWE SmackDown Road to WrestleMania 23 Tour	SmackDown & ECW	Western Springs Stadium	Auckland	Batista vs. Mr. Kennedy for the World Heavyweight Championship
June 11, 2008	WWE Smackdown ECW Tour	SmackDown & ECW	Vector Arena	Auckland	Edge vs. Batista for the World Heavyweight Championship
June 12, 2008	WWE Smackdown ECW Tour	SmackDown & ECW	Westpac Centre	Christchurch	Matt Hardy, Batista & The Undertaker vs. Edge, Montel Vontavious Porter and Mark Henry
July 3, 2009	WWE Raw Live Tour	Raw	Vector Arena	Auckland	Randy Orton & Big Show vs. John Cena & Triple H
August 5, 2010	WWE SmackDown Live 2010	SmackDown	Vector Arena	Auckland	Kane vs. Rey Mysterio for the World Heavyweight Championship
July 6, 2011	WWE World Tour	Raw	Vector Arena	Auckland	John Cena vs. R-Truth for the WWE Championship
August 10, 2016	WWE Live: New Zealand	Unbranded	Vector Arena	Auckland	Roman Reigns vs. Seth Rollins
September 13, 2017	WWE Live: New Zealand	Raw	Horncastle Arena	Christchurch	Roman Reigns vs. Braun Strowman in a Street Fight
December 17, 2026	WWE New Zealand Live Tour 2026	Raw	Spark Arena	Auckland	TBA

== Shows from other international promotions held in New Zealand ==
2003	WWA The Reckoning	World Wrestling All-Stars pay-per view event in Auckland.
2016	On The Mat: Charity Pro Wrestling	Sakura & New Japan Pro-Wrestling house show in Auckland.
2022	Tamashii	New Japan Pro Wrestling show in Auckland.
2026	WSW MegaMania	World Series Wrestling show in Auckland.

== Major events by New Zealand promotions ==
=== CPW MitchellMania ===
MitchellMania
- Promotional poster
- Promotion: CPW
- Date: 17 November 2018
- City: Kilbirnie, New Zealand
- Venue: Kilbirnie Recreation Centre

Capital Pro Wrestling's MitchellMania event is the only event in history to feature wrestlers from every professional wrestling promotion in New Zealand. Promotions featured included UCW, Maniacs United, IPW, PWE, Hughes Academy, Asylum Pro, NZWPW and SPW.

It was a fundraiser and every active New Zealand promotion at the time joined together for the event, raising over $1800 in ticket sales towards getting "New Zealand's biggest wrestling fan" Mitchell Fels to WrestleMania 35.

The story gained mainstream media attention and was featured on Stuff.co.nz and Newshub.

This helped Mitchell Fels receive over $25,000 on Givealittle in total and would later receive free tickets to the Hall of Fame induction ceremony and WrestleMania. This announcement was made on Three's The Project current affairs television programme, by WWE NXT superstar Dakota Kai.

No.	Results	Stipulations
1	No Face defeated "The Spartan" Sam Black	Singles match
2	Taylor Adams and Falcon Kid defeated The Wainui Express	Tag Team match
3	Bryant and Stan Murdoch defeated Detention (Ryder & Sky)	Tag Team match
4	Kingi defeated Shane "The Shooter" Sinclair	Singles match
5	"Rufguts" Roddy Gunn defeated "That Young Warrior" Paul Sayers	Fans Bring the Weapons match
6	Candy Lee, Kirby and Grace Lightning defeated Just Plain Evil, Misty Kitana and Lily Fae	Six-woman tag team match
7	Kane Kahn (c) defeated Will Power, T-Rex and JK Moody	Fatal 4-Way match for the SPW New Zealand Heavyweight Championship
8	Shane "The Shooter" Sinclair won	36-man MitchellMania Rumble Match
(c) / – the champion(s) heading into the match

=== SPW Southern Rumble ===
On 14 July 2018, SPW held the biggest live independent wrestling show seen in New Zealand for over 27 years, the 2018 Southern Rumble, which was held at ILT Stadium in Invercargill in front of 1,200+ in attendance. The event featured well known overseas wrestlers such as Will Ospreay, Tenille Dashwood and Bea Priestley. The main event was a 20-man Southern Rumble match won by Kane Khan.

The 2019 Southern Rumble event was held again in ILT Stadium on 13 July 2019, with similar attendance numbers. The 2019 event was a cross promotional event with Melbourne City Wrestling (MCW). The show featured 8 matches including a Winner Takes All match for the SPW New Zealand Championship and the MCW World Heavyweight Championship. JK Moody won the 20-man Southern Rumble main event. On 24 August 2019, the event aired on TVNZ Duke and was viewed by over 40,000 people.

== Major professional wrestling promotions ==
Name	Location	Owner(s)	Years active	Notes
Dominion Wrestling Union	Wellington	Walter Miller; Steve Rickard	1929–1961	
Impact Pro Wrestling	Auckland; Napier	Robert Eden; Michel Mulipola	2000–present	Started as Mania Pro Wrestling, company re-emerged as IPW early 2003. Previously associated with Australia's Major Impact Wrestling. Its weekly television show, IPW Ignition, was the first wrestling program to air in New Zealand since the 1980s.
New Zealand Wide Pro Wrestling	Petone; Wainuiomata	Martin Stirling	2003–present	Originally known as Wellington Pro Wrestling from 2003 to 2005. Presently inactive.
Southern Pro Wrestling	Invercargill	Troy Crosbie; Marc Perry	2015–present	
Capital Pro Wrestling	Wellington	Jay McLaughlan	2018–present	
River City Pro Wrestling	Whanganui	Ben Thorpe	2018–present	
Hughes Academy	Auckland	Graham Hughes	2014–present	
Valiant Pro	Wainuiomata	Hayden Thiele	2020–present	
Heathen Combat	Hamilton	Charlie Morgan	2019–present	
Unified Championship Wrestling	Christchurch		2017-present	
Aotearoa Wrestling	Auckland		2020-present	

== Television programming ==
=== Weekly ===
Programming	Notes
AEW Collision	Broadcast on Disney+ and MyAEW
AEW Dynamite	Broadcast on Disney+ and MyAEW
WWE NXT	Broadcast live on Netflix.
WWE Raw	Broadcast live on Netflix.
WWE SmackDown	Broadcast live on Netflix.

=== Pay-per-view ===
Programming	Notes
AEW pay-per-view events	Broadcast live on DAZN, MyAEW and PPV.com
WWE premium live events	Broadcast live on Netflix.

=== Former ===
Programming	Notes
On the Mat	(1975–1984) Broadcast exclusively on TV2.
The Main Event	(1990–1991) Broadcast exclusively on TV3.
IPW Ignition	(2007–2011) Broadcast exclusively on Alt TV.
Off the Ropes	(2009–2010) Broadcast exclusively on Prime TV.
Mana Mamau	(2011–2012) Broadcast exclusively on Māori Television.
IPW Ignited	(2015–2016) Broadcast on Canterbury Television and Vimeo.
Aftershock Pro Wrestling	(2016) Broadcast exclusively on Canterbury Television.
SPW Wrestling on the Edge of the World	Broadcast exclusively on TVNZ Duke.
AEW Rampage	(2021-2024) Broadcast on Triller TV and ESPN2.

== See also ==
- Professional wrestling in Australia
- Professional wrestling in the United Kingdom
- Professional wrestling in the United States
