= Samoan Joe =

New Zealand professional wrestler

Personal information
- Born: Joseph Afamasaga; 4 January 1947 New Zealand
- Died: 9 July 2015 (aged 68) Melbourne, Australia

Professional wrestling career
- Ring name: Samoan Joe
- Billed height: 5 ft 11 in (1.80 m)
- Billed weight: 290 lb (130 kg)
- Billed from: Western Samoa
- Debut: c. 1976
- Retired: c. 1989

Joseph Afamasaga (4 January 1947 – 9 July 2015), better known by his ring name Samoan Joe, was a New Zealand professional wrestler who competed in the Australasian and South Pacific region during the 1970s and early 1980s.

He was a popular fan favourite while wrestling for Steve Rickard's All Star-Pro Wrestling and frequently appeared on the long-running wrestling television programme On the Mat. He later travelled to the United States where he had a brief stint in the American Wrestling Association before his retirement in 1989. In 2009, Afamasaga was ranked #10 by New Zealand Herald sports columnist Chris Rattue as one of his "Top 10" favourite wrestlers of all-time.

== Professional wrestling career ==
Joe Afamasaga began wrestling in New Zealand during the mid-1970s and soon joined All Star-Pro Wrestling, then on the rise, under Steve Rickard. He quickly became very well known throughout the country while accompanying the promotion on its national tours as far north as Whangārei as well as his regular appearances on the wrestling programme On the Mat.

By 1977, he had established himself as one of New Zealand's most popular "fan favourites" often appearing on the undercard or in main events against native and foreign "heel" wrestlers alike. That year, he teamed with Mark Lewin and Siva Afi in a losing effort against Bruiser Brody, Bruno Bekkar and King Curtis Iaukea in Wellington, New Zealand on 12 September 1977. Other opponents included Merv Fortune, "Cowboy" Billy Wright, Lars Anderson and Larry O'Day as well as forming a successful tag team with fellow Samoan Lu Leota. He and Fortune also had a memorable mixed tag team match with midget wrestlers Coconut Willie and Little Kevin respectively.

He was among the top New Zealand stars to appear at the Gay World Stadium, as did American wrestlers Killer Karl Krupp, The Masked Assassin and King Kamaka, during ASPW's tour of Singapore in May 1982, along with wrestlers from the United States, West Germany, Australia, Samoa and South America. When the NWA New Zealand Heavyweight Championship was vacated the following year, Afamasaga entered a championship tournament and lost to Rip Morgan in the finals held in Auckland on 8 September 1983. In his final New Zealand TV appearance, Afamasaga wrestled with Larry O'Day, Mel Fortuna, Tony Rickard and Rip Morgan in the final episode of On the Mat which aired on 23 July 1984.

After the cancellation of On the Mat, Afamasaga moved on to Australia where he found some success before heading to the United States. He spent the last year of his career in the American Wrestling Association, mainly used as a preliminary wrestler against opponents such as Brian Knobs and The Rock 'n' Roll Express (Ricky Morton and Robert Gibson), before retiring around 1989. Afamasaga subsequently relocated to Australia where he joined the Church of Jesus Christ of Latter-day Saints and later completed a Mormon mission. He later settled in Victoria where he served on the high council of a Stake presidency. During the 2009 Samoa tsunami, he used Twitter to report on conditions in his homeland and, according to his aunt, claimed that "the body count is in the hundreds" but that his family had escaped danger by reaching higher ground.

Afamasaga appeared in both episodes of On the Mat were chosen to be shown on NZ On Screen in early-2010; the first was a tag team match between him and Lu Leota against Sweet William and Brute Miller (29 July 1980) and the second against Johnny Garcia (17 March 1981). On 9 April 2010, Scoop.co.nz reported that On the Mat ranked #3 among the top 10 most watched videos on NZ On Screen.

A number of New Zealand media personalities have referred to Afamasaga as their favourite wrestlers while watching "On the Mat" as children. Wallace Chapman, co-host of the political interview show Back Benches, claimed that his "favourite TV moment" was watching Afamasaga among other "On the Mat" stars as a child. Jason Conlan, longtime cartoonist for Pro Wrestling Illustrated, has also claimed that Afamasaga was his favourite wrestler. In March 2009, sports columnist Chris Rattue of the New Zealand Herald named several former "On the Mat" stars including Afamasaga as among his "Top 10" favourite wrestlers of all-time.
