= Onno Boelee =

New Zealand actor, judoka and wrestler (1945–2013)

Personal information
- Born: 30 July 1945 Rotterdam, Netherlands
- Died: 18 December 2013 (aged 68) Auckland, New Zealand

Professional wrestling career
- Ring name: Onno Boelee
- Billed height: 6 ft 1 in (1.85 m)
- Billed weight: 125 kg (276 lb)
- Debut: 1970
- Retired: 1976

Onno Boelee (30 July 1945 – 18 December 2013) was a Dutch-New Zealand actor, judoka, stuntman and professional wrestler. In 1966 he won the Oceania Judo Championships. Although he never won a championship title, he was a popular star in Steve Rickard's All Star-Pro Wrestling, frequently appearing on Rickard's wrestling programme On the Mat and later in Japan for Giant Baba and All-Japan Pro Wrestling during the early to mid-1970s.

After his retirement in 1976, Boelee achieved some success as a character actor and stuntman during the 1980s, especially in Hong Kong action cinema, and eventually founded a private security company which is involved in stunt performance, armoury and acting within the New Zealand film and television industry. He is also the younger brother of artist Rudolf Boelee.

== Career ==
Boelee was born in Rotterdam during the hunger winter to Anneke and Bram Boelee, an electrical engineer. His older brother Rudolf (born 1940) emigrated to New Zealand in 1963, and Onno followed him a year later at the age of 18. Onno became a bouncer for the well-known Shantytown night club in Queen Street, Auckland. Rudolf painted a portrait of Onno which was displayed at Shantytown for many years. When the occasional patron became upset with his brother, according to Rudolf, they would throw their drink at the painting rather than at him.

Boelee began training at a gym in Mount Roskill for a career in professional wrestling. He made his debut in 1970 working for Ernie Pinchers and South Pacific Wrestling. A year later, he joined Steve Rickard's All Star-Pro Wrestling and toured the country for the next five years. In one of his most memorable matches, he and partners Frank Lipanovich and Bronco Barnes took on the 490 pound André the Giant and "Kiwi" Johnny Frazer in a three-on-two handicap match at the sold-out Auckland YMCA in 1972; this was André the Giant's official debut in New Zealand. Boelee was also invited to Japan where he appeared for Giant Baba and All-Japan Pro Wrestling from September–November 1974.

In 1975, Boelee was among the many native New Zealanders to appear on Rickard's wrestling programme On the Mat. During its first two years, he was one of the show's first stars with bouts against some of the top names in New Zealand including "Wild" Don Scott, Jock Ruddock, Merve Fortune, Del Adams, Robert Bruce, King Curtis Iaukea, Teddy Williams, Butch Miller, Bruno Bekkar, Johnny Garcia, Al Hobman and John da Silva, and international stars Big Bad John, Abdullah the Butcher, Bulldog Brower, Mark Lewin, Waldo Von Erich, and The Sheik.

Following his retirement from the wrestling business, Boelee tried his hand at acting. He found some success in local independent films with roles in Prisoners (1981), Other Halves (1984) and Second Time Lucky (1984). His brief foray into the Hong Kong action cinema genre, however, saw a rise in his career with supporting roles in Mad Mission 4: You Never Die Twice and Legacy of Rage (1986). He also starred in director Garth Maxwell's 1988 independent film Beyond Gravity before taking a break from acting for the next several years.

Boelee eventually started a successful private security company which became involved in stunt performance, armoury and acting in the New Zealand film and television industry. In 1994, after a six-year absence, Boelee appeared as Gargan the Giant in the television movie Hercules and the Lost Kingdom. He also had a minor role in the 2000 independent short film Sci-Fi Betty, guest starred on the children's TV series Power Rangers Dino Thunder in 2004, and on both Maddigan's Quest and Street Legal in 2006. In recent years, his security company has participated in the productions of Crooked Earth and Orange Roughies.

Boelee was also among the many veteran New Zealand wrestlers who attended a "legends reunion" show at Petone and was later interviewed by Kiwi Pro Wrestling in 2007.

== Filmography and TV roles ==
Film
Year	Film	Role	Notes
1981	Prisoners	Squeeze	
1984	Other Halves	Patient	
1984	Second Time Lucky	Ripperus	
1986	Mad Mission 4: You Never Die Twice	Hornsby	"Zuijia paidang zhi qianli jiu chaipo (HK title)"
1986	Legacy of Rage	Prisoner	"Long zai jiang hu (HK title)"
1988	Beyond Gravity	Truck driver	
2000	Sci-Fi Betty	The Bouncer	Short film
Television
Year	Title	Role	Notes
1994	Hercules and the Lost Kingdom	Gargan the Giant	Television movie
2004	Power Rangers Dino Thunder	Security guard	Episode: "Thunder Storm, Part 1 & 2"
2006	Maddigan's Quest	Mean Milton Man	Episode: "Road Rats"
2006	Street Legal	Boris	Episode: "No Man Put Asunder"
