= On the Mat =

- Created by: Steve Rickard
- Directed by: John Lye
- Presented by: Steve Rickard; Ernie Leonard; Barry Holland
- Starring: All Star Pro-Wrestling roster
- Country of origin: New Zealand
- No. of seasons: 9

Production
- Producers: Ernie Leonard; Michael Scott
- Production locations: Auckland, Christchurch and Hamilton, New Zealand
- Camera setup: Multicamera setup
- Running time: Approximately 24–25 minutes per episode (30 minutes with commercials)
- Production companies: South Pacific Pictures; Television New Zealand

Original release
- Network: TV2 (1975–1984)
- Release: 3 July 1975 – 23 July 1984

On the Mat is a professional wrestling television programme for the National Wrestling Alliance-affiliated All Star Pro Wrestling (ASPW), or simply NWA New Zealand, that aired on Television New Zealand's TV2 from 1975 to 1984. One of the most popular and the longest-running weekly sports series in the history of New Zealand, the show featured some of the country's top wrestlers and international stars from throughout the world during the 1970s and early 1980s.

On the Mat characterized the "golden age" of professional wrestling in New Zealand and made household names of promoter Steve Rickard, John da Silva, Robert Bruce and others during the 1970s. Much of the show's popularity was based on native New Zealanders and foreign wrestlers working together against their common enemies or, sometimes, being pitted against each other. Several New Zealand wrestlers such as Tony Garea, Peter Maivia, Siva Afi and The Sheepherders, partly from their television appearances, were brought over to the United States where they became major stars during the 1980s wrestling boom. Likewise, wrestlers from the National Wrestling Alliance, Stampede Wrestling, the World Wide Wrestling Federation and other foreign promotions were regulars on the show.

As a member of the National Wrestling Alliance, the NWA World Heavyweight Championship was defended on the show on several occasions, both between North American wrestlers and against New Zealanders, by legendary champions such as Harley Race and "The Nature Boy" Ric Flair. Similarly, NWA storylines and feuds were played out on the programme that would usually not have been seen in the US. In 1983, for example, the show aired what was a controversial ending to a best 2-of-3 falls match between Ric Flair and Mark Lewin in Auckland which saw the NWA World title momentarily change hands but was then returned to Flair via reverse decision. A year later, another NWA title change took place between Flair and Harley Race in Wellington and Geylang, Singapore though these would not be officially recognised by the NWA for several years.

Its cancellation in the early-1980s signalled the decline and eventual close of All Star Pro-Wrestling by the end of the decade. Apart from the short run of The Main Event made for TV3 in 1990, locally produced and televised professional wrestling would remain absent in New Zealand until the appearance of Impact Pro Wrestling's IPW Ignition and Kiwi Pro Wrestling's Off the Ropes in the mid-2000s.

== Show history ==
=== Background ===
In the years following the Second World War, professional wrestling in New Zealand became extremely popular reaching a high point in the 1950s. The death of longtime Dominion Wrestling Union promoter Walter Miller in 1959, however, caused the promotion to go into a slump as appearances from foreign wrestlers dwindled to only a small few each year. Steve Rickard, one of its rising stars, continued to run the DWU for two years before starting his own promotion, All Star Pro-Wrestling, in 1962. Another New Zealand wrestler, John da Silva, started a short-lived rival promotion called the Central Wrestling Association which operated up until the 1970s.

During the next decade, Rickard and da Silva were able to develop new stars such as Al Hobman, Tony Garea, Peter Maivia, and The Sheepherders. They were also eventually able, along with Australia-based American promoter Jim Barnett, bring back more foreign stars to the Australasian region. New Zealand was often visited by Australian wrestlers Ron Miller and Larry O'Day of World Championship Wrestling, Robert Bruce from Scotland, Canadians Gordon Nelson and George Gordienko, and French wrestler André the Giant.

American wrestlers became especially popular with the public during the early 1970s. One of the biggest US tours occurred in 1972 when Big Bad John, Bulldog Brower, Les Wolff, King Curtis Iaukea, Spiros Arion, Mark Lewin, Thunderbolt Patterson, Sweet Daddy Siki, Tarzan Tyler, Dewey Robertson and Haystacks Calhoun wrestled throughout New Zealand. Calhoun and his wife were often seen and talked about in the national media. The couple made numerous television appearances, press interviews and visited schools. That same year, the Rickard-Barnett partnership ended when Barnett sold his share of Big Time Wrestling, an Australian wrestling programme that had briefly aired in New Zealand, and returned to work in the United States. Rickard then decided to promote wrestling events full-time with All Star Pro-Wrestling. Rickard's later affiliation with the National Wrestling Alliance ensured the arrival of many wrestlers from North America and elsewhere for the next several years.

=== Early history ===
With the influx of new talent, both from New Zealand and abroad, Steve Rickard considered creating a weekly television series, much like Britain's World of Sport, to showcase these wrestlers to a national audience and capitalize on the popularity of his promotion's live events and from foreign wrestlers then touring the country. According to Rickard, the promotion sold-out the Wellington Winter Show Buildings ten weeks in a row and still had to turn away hundreds more. Prior to the introduction of television in New Zealand in 1960, wrestling had been extremely popular through live radio broadcasts. In the later years of the "television era" of the 1970s and 80s, television stations commonly aired professional wrestling, such as Hollywood Wrestling or Wrestling at the Chase, as a source of inexpensive yet popular programing.

Encouraged by successful wrestling shows in Australia and the US, Rickard recorded a film pilot at a cost of $500 using matches from one of his shows at the Wellington Winter Show Buildings in 1973. This included a midget wrestling match and another with American wrestler Harley Race. Rickard initially approached TV1 and used the pilot to "pitch" the idea for a New Zealand-based professional wrestling programme. The network showed little interest in the show and eventually passed on the idea. When TV2 was established two years later, however, Rickard managed to get a meeting with then programme director Kevan Moore. A deal was quickly made and Rickard worked with South Pacific Pictures to develop and produce this new wrestling programme. Tim Bickerstaff, a popular New Zealand radio personality and television sports writer, was involved in filming early episodes of the show.

On the Mat debuted as a half-hour late night series on Television New Zealand's TV2 on 3 July 1975. The show was hosted by colour commentator Ernie Leonard along with Steve Rickard as the play-by-play announcer. Many of the top stars in New Zealand and from around the world during the 1970s and early-1980s appeared on the show during its 9-year run.

The show became an overnight sensation, both in New Zealand and internationally, and was one of the country's highest rated shows of all time. For much of its history, On the Mat was centred around a core group of native stars headlined by Wellington-based wrestlers Steve Rickard, John Da Silva and Robert Bruce who became household names by the end of the 1970s. Another Pacific star, King Curtis Iaukea, was the main "heel" wrestler for many years as were Australia's Ron Miller and Larry O'Day. Other foreign wrestlers to appear on the programme included Pat Barrett, Dick Beyer, Man Mountain Link, Les Thornton, Leo Burke, Ripper Collins, Rick Martel, Tiger Jeet Singh, Ali Vizeri and Abdullah the Butcher.

Peter Maivia and Siva Afi were also very popular during this period and they became the focus of the show within several years. Rickard promoted both Maivia and Afi to appeal to the Polynesian market in New Zealand much in the same way Vince McMahon, Sr. did with Bruno Sammartino and Italian Americans in New York during the 1960s. In 1978, Afi defeated John da Silva in a tournament final to capture the NWA New Zealand Heavyweight Championship on 23 April 1978. It was the first time a Samoan wrestler had held the New Zealand championship since 1964. A year later, Miavia won the NWA British Empire/Commonwealth Championship from Ripper Collins in Auckland.

At the start of the show's off-season each year, Rickard and his wrestlers spent the three months on international tours overseas in the Middle East, India, Singapore, Malaysia, Pakistan, Thailand, Hong Kong and Hawaii.

=== Height in popularity ===
On the Mat's success greatly increased attendance for live events throughout the country. Imported talent coming as far away as the United States, Canada, Japan and Australia to challenge local wrestlers, particularly ones that fans could identify with and relate to, kept viewers tuning in each week. The show's popularity also brought the first television exposure to New Zealand stars and, due in part to their TV appearances for On the Mat, Peter Maivia, Tony Garea and The Sheepherders were all brought to the US where they became major stars in the NWA and the World Wide Wrestling Federation in the 1970s, and later in the World Wrestling Federation during the 1980s wrestling boom. WWWF stars such as Don Muraco, Toru Tanaka, Mr. Fuji and Rocky Johnson also appeared on the show while touring the country.

Original storylines, apart from the NWA, were also featured in the show. Robert Bruce, who had originally come to New Zealand as a fan favourite, "turned heel", reformed as a "face" then returned to being a heel within the span of a few weeks. His antics gained himself and others national attention and enraged crowds so much that he was actually stabbed by an irate fan. Rickard's two sons were also involved in the promotion. One episode in 1980 featured a tag team match with Ricky Rickard as a participant, his brother Tony Rickard refereeing the match and their father Steve Rickard commentating. The show sometimes featured celebrity guests, most notably, radio personality Billy T. James.

On 17 March 1981, Barry Holland officially took over Ernie Leonard's position as head announcer so Leonard could work full-time behind the scenes in his role as producer. Returning from a period of touring Southeast Asia and Africa, Steve Rickard announced the show was being aired in Kenya, Tanzania, Hong Kong and Malaysia as well as the arrivals of Abdullah the Butcher, Bret Hart, and possibly "The Original Sheik" Ed Farhat. Also on that episode, Rickard read aloud a letter sent to him by Larry O'Day in which the Australian wrestler taunted Rickard over breaking the leg of his son earlier that year and publicly accepted O'Day's challenge to a match for the NWA British Empire/Commonwealth Championship. A month after the death of Peter Maivia, the 6 July 1982 edition of "On the Mat" was a tribute show in his memory and the promotion broadcast two of his matches.

=== Involvement with the NWA ===
An official member of the NWA since 1972, many of its top stars were featured on the programme when they visited New Zealand. As a result, NWA storylines and feuds not only became part of the show but were usually not seen by fans outside the country. This was especially true of title defences for the NWA World Heavyweight Championship, defended on the show on several occasions, involving both foreign and native New Zealand wrestlers.

Peter Maivia very nearly won the title from then reigning champion Harley Race in Western Springs Stadium in 1979, winning the bout via disqualification, and there was a serious concern the estimated 10,000 fans in attendance would riot if Maivia did not address the crowd to explain why the NWA did not allow title changes based on a disqualification win. A 30-minute NWA title match between Race and Rick Martel took up an entire episode of On the Mat. After returning to the US, Race would later send a tape of this match to promoters before he entered a territory.

Another controversial match occurred in 1983 when Mark Lewin seemingly won the NWA title from "The Nature Boy" Ric Flair in a best 2-of-3 falls match in Auckland. Although he scored the winning pinfall, and was given the belt, the decision was reversed by referees due to Flair having been tossed over the top rope moments before. Although this was not an illegal move in New Zealand, the bout was under NWA regulations and referees were forced to disqualify Lewin. In a post-match brawl, Lewin knocked out Flair with the belt and left the ring with it. The following year, the NWA World title changed hands between Ric Flair and Harley Race in Wellington, New Zealand and Geylang, Singapore though it would be several years before the NWA eventually recognised them.

=== Cancellation ===
By the early 1980s, though the show was still popular, it became increasingly more difficult for Rickard to bring in top quality wrestlers from overseas. The World Wrestling Federation's national expansion under Vince McMahon in the US resulted in the decline of the National Wrestling Alliance and made the top American stars less available to travel outside the US. Rickard and World Championship Wrestling had also long shared the transportation costs of bringing in foreign wrestlers into the Pacific, however, the close of WCW in 1978 resulted in Rickard taking on the full cost himself. Even local stars such as Peter Maivia and Siva Afi, despite their popularity in New Zealand, left the country to compete in the US.

The high costs of running the show, in addition to a worsening economy in New Zealand, forced Rickard to cancel the show in 1984. The final episode aired on 23 July 1984, and featured Samoan Joe, Larry O'Day, Mel Fortuna, Tony Rickard and Rip Morgan. He and All Star Pro-Wrestling attempted a couple of tours during the next two years but the show's cancellation eventually saw the close of his promotion.

== Production ==
The show usually aired on a late night timeslot each week on Tuesdays and was approximately 24–25 minutes in length (produced for a 30-minute time-slot) per episode. The first 14 episodes were taped in Auckland, and in Hamilton for a short time, before settling in at the Canterbury Court Stadium in Christchurch. The final season in 1983–84 was shot at the Auckland YMCA. The show was not only a ratings success, it also helped promote live events which sold out town halls and other venues throughout the country on a weekly basis. By the time the show ended, Rickard estimated he had promoted shows in 135 New Zealand cities and towns.

=== Episode format ===
Each episode opened with a video of the All Star Pro-Wrestlers competing in various matches as well as the show's theme song, before going to an introduction and the opening match. An episode typically featured two to three matches (and sometimes footage from a recent live event or match from overseas) as well as post-match interviews and vignettes from wrestlers regarding their upcoming matches or current storylines. Celebrity guests were often invited to the show where they were later interviewed by one of the hosts such as comedian and radio personality Billy T. James in 1980. The show typically ended after the main event (the final match on an episode) and closed similar to the opening credits.

=== Memorable episodes ===
Episode	Date	Rating	Notes
On the Mat Debut	3 July 1975	N/A	The first ever On the Mat episode.
Harley Race NWA World Title defence	1979	N/A	Sivi Afi unsuccessfully challenged Harley Race for the NWA World Heavyweight Championship.
On the Mat with Billy T. James	29 July 1980	N/A	New Zealand comedian and actor Billy T. James was a celebrity guest and later interviewed by host Ernie Leonard.
Peter Maivia Tribute Show	6 July 1982	N/A	Tribute in memory of Peter Maivia.
Ric Flair NWA World Title defence	3 March 1983	N/A	Mark Lewin defeats Ric Flair for the NWA World Heavyweight Championship but is reversed via referee decision.

== On-air personalities ==
=== Champions ===
==== NWA British Empire/Commonwealth Championship ====
Wrestler:	Defeated:	Date:	Place:	Event:	Notes:
John Da Silva	Bulldog Brower	1975	N/A	N/A	
Robert Bruce	John Da Silva	1975	N/A	N/A	
John Da Silva	Robert Bruce	1976	N/A	N/A	
Don Muraco	John Da Silva	1977	N/A	N/A	
King Curtis Iaukea	Don Muraco	1977	N/A	N/A	
Rick Martel	King Curtis Iaukea	26 May 1977	Auckland, NZ	N/A	
Ali Vaziri	Rick Martel	1977	N/A	N/A	
Tommy Seigler	Ali Vaziri	1977	N/A	N/A	The championship is vacated when Seigler leaves New Zealand in 1978.
Les Thornton	N/A	January 1978	N/A	N/A	
Chris Markoff	Les Thornton	1978	N/A	N/A	
Ron Miller	Chris Markoff	1978	Auckland, NZ	N/A	
Jack Claybourne	Ron Miller	April 1978	Australia	N/A	
Toru Tanaka	Jack Claybourne	13 June 1978	Christchurch, NZ	N/A	
Steve Rickard	Toru Tanaka	22 June 1978	Auckland, NZ	N/A	
Toru Tanaka	Steve Rickard	20 July 1978	Auckland, NZ	N/A	
Steve Rickard	Toru Tanaka	17 August 1978	Auckland, NZ	N/A	
Mad Dog Martin	Steve Rickard	28 September 1978	Auckland, NZ	N/A	
Leo Burke	Mad Dog Martin	1979	N/A	N/A	
Rick Martel	Leo Burke	19 March 1979	Auckland, NZ	N/A	
Ripper Collins	Rick Martel	28 May 1979	Auckland, NZ	N/A	
Peter Maivia	Ripper Collins	20 August 1979	Auckland, NZ	N/A	
Mr. Fuji	Peter Maivia	3 September 1979	Auckland, NZ	N/A	
Rick Martel	Mr. Fuji	N/A	N/A	N/A	The championship is vacated when Martel leaves New Zealand in 1980.
Ron Miller	N/A	May 1980	Australia	N/A	Won in a tournament.
Larry O'Day	Ron Miller	14 July 1980	Auckland, NZ	N/A	
Ron Miller	Larry O'Day	28 July 1980	Auckland, NZ	N/A	
Steve Rickard	Ron Miller	29 October 1980	Auckland, NZ	N/A	
Jos LeDuc	Steve Rickard	23 April 1981	Auckland, NZ	N/A	
Mark Lewin	Jos LeDuc	30 April 1981	Auckland, NZ	N/A	
Jos LeDuc	Mark Lewin	9 July 1981	Auckland, NZ	N/A	
Steve Rickard	Jos LeDuc	13 August 1981	Auckland, NZ	N/A	
Butcher Brannigan	Steve Rickard	17 September 1981	Auckland, NZ	N/A	
Steve Rickard	Butcher Brannigan	24 September 1981	Auckland, NZ	N/A	
Baron Karl Von Krupp	Steve Rickard	3 June 1982	Auckland, NZ	N/A	
Steve Rickard	Baron Karl Von Krupp	1 July 1982	Auckland, NZ	N/A	
Ox Baker	Steve Rickard	9 September 1982	Auckland, NZ	N/A	
Al Perez	Ox Baker	September 1982	N/A	N/A	
King Kamata	Al Perez	7 October 1982	Auckland, NZ	N/A	
Al Perez	King Kamata	October 1982	Auckland, NZ	N/A	
Pat O'Connor	Al Perez	4 November 1982	Auckland, NZ	N/A	Title is later vacated.
Butcher Brannigan		1983	N/A	N/A	
Ricky Rickard	Butcher Brannigan	1983	N/A	N/A	
Larry O'Day	Rick Rickard	1983	N/A	N/A	
Steve Rickard	Larry O'Day	1983	N/A	N/A	
Zar Mongol	Steve Rickard	1983	N/A	N/A	
Steve Rickard	Zar Mongol	1983	N/A	N/A	

==== NWA Australasian Tag Team Championship ====
Team:	Defeated:	Date:	Place:	Event:	Notes:
Steve Rickard and Mark Lewin	N/A	8 October 1981	N/A		Awarded titles.
King Kamaka and Baron Von Krupp	Steve Rickard and Mark Lewin	6 May 1982	Auckland, NZ		
Steve Rickard and Mark Lewin	King Kamaka and Baron Von Krupp	27 May 1982	Auckland, NZ		
King Kamaka and Ox Baker	Steve Rickard and Mark Lewin	19 August 1982	Auckland, NZ		
Mark Lewin and Al Perez	King Kamaka and Ox Baker	30 September 1982	Auckland, NZ		
King Kamaka and General Hiro	Mark Lewin and Al Perez	21 October 1982	Auckland, NZ		
Larry O'Day and Ripper Collins	King Kamaka and General Hiro	1983	N/A		
Mark and Chris Youngblood	Larry O'Day and Ripper Collins	1984	N/A		

=== Commentators ===
Commentators	Dates
Ernie Leonard and Steve Rickard	1975–1980
Barry Holland and Steve Rickard	17 March 1981 – c. 1984

=== Ring announcers ===
Ring Announcer	Dates
Burt Durn	1975-c. 1984

== Revival with The Main Event ==
In 1990, Steve Rickard proposed a new wrestling programme under a similar format and, supported by Isambard Productions, secured a deal with the newly established TV3 to air The Main Event that year. The show was filmed at ASB Stadium in Auckland and the first episode aired in May. The show's producers attempted to replicate the high production values of the World Wrestling Federation's WWF Superstars of Wrestling, which had premiered on TV2 the previous year to high ratings, but also clashed with the more basic and traditional style of On the Mat.

Airing on a slightly earlier timeslot than WWF Superstars, it was technically not in head-to-head competition, however its attempt to emulate the sports entertainment aspect of the WWF failed to impress neither the critics nor fans. Gus Forearm, a columnist for the Sunday News, wrote "Okay, it is filmed in New Zealand – but it lacks any of the gloss and zap we've become used to, thanks to TVNZ's Superstars of Wrestling show and many of the NWA wrestlers on the show simply don't rate on the Forearm scale of skill".

The hiring of John Dybvig, a former US basketball coach and commentator, was the main "heel" announcer who portrayed a stereotypical "loudmouth" American. His unpopularity, however, did not come from his on-air persona but rather his lack of knowledge about professional wrestling and is believed to have also hurt the show in the long run.

A WWF tour of Christchurch, Wellington and Auckland had drawn over 15,000 people and it was expected that the costs of filming such a high-cost show could be offset by profits made from the gate takings at the ASB Stadium but attendance was much less than expected. In the end, The Main Event was unable to compete with the WWF for ratings and was cancelled after 11 episodes.

Like the final years of "On the Mat", Siva Afi was the main star of the programme. Returning from a brief stint in the WWF, it was his first major appearance in the country since 1978. On 13 July 1990, he defeated Canadian Stockman for the NWA British Empire/Commonwealth Championship and remained undefeated throughout the series. After The Main Event's cancellation, the NWA British Empire/Commonwealth title was retired after a 60-year history.

== Legacy ==
Over 20 years after its cancellation, On the Mat has remained the longest-running weekly sports series in New Zealand's history. It has since achieved a cult status in New Zealand popular culture and has been an influencing factor among several New Zealand media personalities. Wallace Chapman, co-host of the political interview show Back Benches, has said his "favourite TV moment" was watching On the Mat as a child. Oscar Kightley, a Samoan-born actor and writer, has credited the series for partly inspiring his stories. Several writers for NZPWI.co.nz, including editor-in-chief Dion McCracken, have also claimed to have been fans of the show as children. Another childhood fan is New Zealand-born cartoonist Jason Conlan, also known as Pro Wrestling Illustrated's "Mr. J", whose monthly comic strip shares the same name. Tim Bickerstaff, a one time crew member for On the Mat, recalled working for Rickard in a sports column for XTRA in 1999. Television New Zealand counted On the Mat among the most notable programmes in its 50-year history.

It was not until the emergence of the country's three major promotions, Impact Pro Wrestling, Kiwi Pro Wrestling and New Zealand Wide Pro Wrestling, that nationally syndicated wrestling returned to New Zealand television with the debut of IPW Ignition in 2007 and Off the Ropes in 2009. Both shows were also made available to an international audience via internet broadcasting. Also in 2009, in memory of the passing of Scottish-born New Zealand wrestler Robert Bruce, Chris Rattue of The New Zealand Herald named several former On the Mat stars including Bruce, King Curtus Iaukea, Rick Martel, Steve Rickard, John da Silva, Peter Maivia, Samoan Joe and The Bushwhackers as among his Top 10 favourite wrestlers of all-time.

In early-2010, two episodes were chosen to be shown on NZ On Screen and Tammy Davis of Outrageous Fortune starred in an internet promotional video which spoofed the series. On 9 April, Scoop.co.nz reported that On the Mat ranked #3 among the top 10 most watched videos on NZ on Screen. The episodes were favourably reviewed by 411mania.com shortly after their release and whose author, Ryan Byers, wrote they "were very fun to watch as a curiosity, a look into an old territory that I, as an American, have almost never seen or even heard discussed" and that "these shows created an interest in me in seeing more from the New Zealand territory, if for no other reason than to document some of the forgotten career moments of US wrestlers who heavily toured abroad".

In 2024 the rights to the On The Mat name were acquired by the New Zealand wrestling promotion Legacy Pro Wrestling (LPW).

== See also ==
- List of professional wrestling television series
- Professional wrestling in New Zealand
- IPW Ignition
- Off the Ropes
