= Ricky Rickard =

New Zealand wrestler

Personal information
- Born: 1958 (age 67–68) New Zealand

Professional wrestling career
- Ring name(s): Ricky Rickard; Rick Rickard
- Trained by: Steve Rickard
- Debut: 1978
- Retired: 1984

Rick "Ricky" Rickard (born 1958) is a retired New Zealand professional wrestler who competed in the National Wrestling Alliance-affiliated All Star-Pro Wrestling, promoted by his father Steve Rickard, as well as touring Australia, Singapore, Malaysia and the United States during the 1970s and early 1980s. He was a mainstay on his father's wrestling programme On the Mat and briefly held the NWA British Empire/Commonwealth Championship in 1983. Rickard also had a successful 10-year amateur career representing New Zealand as an amateur wrestler in the United States.

== Career ==
Ricky Rickard began his career as an amateur at the age of 10 performing at Raynor Greeks Hall. As a youngster, he trained on a very small canvas mat before his father, Steve Rickard, purchased a rubber round mat for several thousand dollars. Rickard went on to have a long and successful career in the amateur ranks and eventually represented New Zealand in competition in the United States.

Rickard later built a traditional mini-roped ring under his father's gym, where many local professional wrestlers trained, and decided to turn pro in 1978. He started his career wrestling for Steve Rickard's All Star-Pro Wrestling, the country's single major company and overseas territory of the National Wrestling Alliance. He became very well known throughout his national tours with ASPW, which lasted around two years, as well as visits to Australia, Singapore, Malaysia and the United States. Rickard was also a regular on ASPW's popular wrestling programme On the Mat where he frequently battled both local and foreign wrestlers such as Ox Baker, King Curtis Iaukea, Larry O'Day and Abdullah the Butcher. His toughest opponent, according to Rickard, was against Stampede World Mid-Heavyweight Champion Bruce Hart. He also occasionally teamed with younger wrestlers such as Kid Hardy and Rick Martel.

Ricky Rickard's brother Tony was also involved with the promotion as a referee. One On the Mat episode in 1980 featured a tag team match with Ricky as a participant, Tony refereeing the match and their father Steve Rickard commentating. This was one of the few occurrences in pro wrestling history that members of the same family wrestled in, refereed, and commentated on the same match at the same time and being unrelated to an active "storyline". One of the few storylines Rickard was the focus of, however, was when his leg was broken by Larry O'Day during an off-season tour in Southeast Asia in early-1981. Steve Rickard publicly addressed the incident when On the Mat returned for a new season. In its first return episode, originally airing on 17 March 1981, Rickard read a letter from Larry O'Day who bragged about breaking his son's leg and publicly accepted O'Day's challenge to a match for the NWA British Empire/Commonwealth Championship. Ricky Rickard did suffer legitimate injuries during his professional career including twice breaking his nose, leg, back sockets and collar bone.

Soon returning to active competition, Rickard captured the NWA British Empire/Commonwealth Championship from Butcher Brannigan in 1983 before losing the title to Larry O'Day that same year. After the cancellation of On the Mat in 1984, Rickard retired and became a hotel manager. Though no longer active in professional wrestling, Rickard did grant an interview to Kiwi Pro Wrestling, one of New Zealand's three major companies, which was later published on its website in August 2007. Three years later, one of Rickard's matches, a tag team match between him and Kid Hardy against Merv Fortune and Larry O'Day (29 July 1980) at the Canterbury Court Stadium, was included in one of two episodes of On the Mat chosen to be shown on NZ On Screen in early-2010. The match was later used to promote the series in an internet spoof video starring Tammy Davis of Outrageous Fortune. On 9 April 2010, Scoop.co.nz reported that On the Mat ranked #3 among the top 10 most watched videos on NZ on Screen.

== Championships and accomplishments ==
- All Star Pro-Wrestling
  - NWA British Empire/Commonwealth Championship (New Zealand version) (1 time)
