= John Garea =

New Zealand wrestler

Johnny Garcia
Personal information
- Born: 1949 (age 76–77) Auckland, New Zealand

Professional wrestling career
- Ring name: Johnny Garcia
- Billed height: 1.85 m (6 ft 1 in)
- Billed weight: 111 kg (245 lb)
- Trained by: "Wild" Don Scott
- Debut: 1970
- Retired: 1992

John "Johnny" Garea (born 1949) is a semi-retired New Zealand professional wrestler, known by his ring name Johnny Garcia, who competed in Steve Rickard's All Star-Pro Wrestling, World Championship Wrestling and occasionally for the World Wrestling Federation during the 1970s and 80s. The youngest pro wrestler in New Zealand at the time of his debut in 1970, he was a regular on the Australian wrestling programme Big Time Wrestling and its New Zealand counterpart On the Mat as well as a two-time NWA New Zealand Heavyweight Champion. Garea is the real life brother of four-time WWWF World Tag Team Champion and WWE Road Agent Tony Garea.

== Career ==
Born in Auckland, New Zealand, the son of Croatian-born Ivan Gareljich, Garea began training at the Mt. Roskill gymnasium with "Wild" Don Scott in English-style catch-as-catch-can wrestling and made his pro wrestling debut in 1970, a year before his older brother Tony Garea. At age 21, he was the youngest professional wrestler in the country. Garea's early career was spent in the South Pacific Wrestling Association for Auckland promoter Ernie Pinches and quickly became a regular on the New Zealand circuit. As Tony Garea left for the United States, Johnny Garcia made his way to Australia where he wrestled for Jim Barnett and World Championship Wrestling.

Garea often appeared on WCW's wrestling programme broadcast on the Nine Network while in Australia. He was the first New Zealander to appear on Big Time Wrestling, a short-lived Australian programme aired in his home country in 1973, and joined New Zealand promoter Steve Rickard's All Star-Pro Wrestling after Barnett left for the United States the following year. In 1975, he and The Sheepherders (Butch Miller and Luke Williams) were among the first standout talent of On the Mat and started touring the country. Garea also wrestled overseas as well visiting such faraway countries as Thailand, Kuala Lumpur, Singapore and Japan in Asia, the South Pacific islands of Fiji and Tahiti, and in the United States. He was able to get bookings in various NWA territories and, partly due to his connections with his brother Tony, briefly wrestled for the World Wrestling Federation.

Garea would continue to appear on On the Mat for nearly a decade during which time he faced off against many of the top names not only in Australasia, such as Steve Rickard, John da Silva, Robert Bruce and Al Hobman, but from around the world including former World Champion Tiger Jeet Singh, The Sheik and Mark Lewin from the National Wrestling Alliance, and Big Bad John, Rocky Johnson, Don Muraco, and Rick Martel from the World Wide Wrestling Federation. Years later, Garea claimed that his toughest opponents were André the Giant and "the world's strongest man" Paul Graham, in addition to a brutal series of cage matches with King Curtis Iaukea. By 1981, he had become a main-eventer on the show.

After the cancellation of On the Mat in 1984, Garea remained with All Star-Pro Wrestling and eventually became involved in a near 5-year feud with Bruno Bekkar over the NWA New Zealand Heavyweight Championship during the mid-to late 1980s, winning the title twice, before losing the title back to Bekkar in 1990. Garea went into semi-retirement with All Star-Pro Wrestling closing in 1992 and eventually became a rancher with a sizeable lifestyle block in Warkworth.

On 24 January 2004, Garea was among the many veteran New Zealand wrestlers who attended a "legends reunion" show at Petone. In June 2008, he made a public appearance with his brother Tony, Butch Miller, and Rip Morgan ay a WWE event in New Zealand. He was also interviewed at his Warkworth ranch as part of a documentary on professional wrestling in New Zealand, A Kiwi Century on the Mat, in August 2010.

== Championships and accomplishments ==
- All Star-Pro Wrestling
  - NWA New Zealand Heavyweight Championship (2 times)
