= Southern Pro Wrestling =

- Acronym: SPW
- Founded: 2015
- Headquarters: Invercargill, New Zealand
- Founder(s): Troy Crosbie; Marc Perry
- Website: spwrestling.co.nz

Southern Pro Wrestling (SPW) is a New Zealand professional wrestling promotion. Since the promotion's formation in 2015, it has promoted regular live events throughout the country predominantly in Invercargill and Queenstown In 2018, SPW held the biggest live independent wrestling show seen in New Zealand for over 27 years, the 2018 Southern Rumble, which was held at ILT Stadium in Invercargill in front of 1,200+ in attendance. SPW has led to a resurgence of the popularity and mainstream media coverage of professional wrestling in New Zealand. The 2019 Southern Rumble event was held again in ILT Stadium, with similar attendance numbers. SPW currently has over 30 full-time employees. In March 2019, SPW signed a deal with New Zealand's largest free-to-air broadcaster, TVNZ with an audience of 2 million people. 22 June 2019, marked the return of New Zealand pro-wrestling on TVNZ for the first time since On the Mat ended 35 years prior. On 24 August 2019, the 2019 Southern Rumble event aired on TVNZ Duke and was viewed by over 40,000 people.

== Founders ==
Troy Crosbie and Marc Perry are the founders of SPW. Perry was trained by WWE legend Lance Storm in Calgary, Alberta, Canada and since then has wrestled and performed across New Zealand.

Marc Perry was trained by UK World of Sport legend Steve Logan and former WWE superstar Drake Maverick. He has wrestled all over the United Kingdom, Europe, Australia and NZ and worked with well-known international wrestlers. He has taken part in WWE Tryouts and performed for New Japan Pro-Wrestling.

== Notable Appearances ==
Various well-known international wrestlers have made appearances in SPW such as Travis Banks, Tenille Dashwood, Bea Priestley, Jimmy Havoc and Will Ospreay. Travis Banks appeared in SPW at the Southern Rumble on 13 July 2019, despite being under contract with WWE on its NXT UK brand at the time. The 2019 Southern Rumble event was a cross-promotional event with Melbourne City Wrestling (MCW)

== Championships ==
=== Current champions ===
Championship	Current champion(s)	Date won	Event	Previous Champion(s)
SPW New Zealand Championship	Cool Guy Sky	August 9, 2025	Southern Rumble (2025)	Azza
SPW New Zealand Tag Team Championship	Hammer and Will Power	March 7, 2026	Fight for Gold (2026)	King and Crosscheck (Micheal Richards and Nico Bell)

=== SPW New Zealand Championship ===
SPW New Zealand Championship

Details
- Promotion: Southern Pro Wrestling
- Date established: 17 March 2016
- Current champion: Azza
Statistics
- First champion: Shane Sinclair
- Most reigns: K9 (3)
- Longest reign: Will Power (637 days)
- Shortest reign: Kane Khan (<1 day)

The SPW New Zealand Championship is the top professional wrestling championship title in the New Zealand promotion Southern Pro Wrestling (SPW). The inaugural champion was "The Shooter" Shane Sinclair, who defeated "Hooligan" Marcus Kool & "Powerhouse" T-Rex in the tournament final at the Fight For Gold event in Invercargill.

==== Title history ====
Key
No.	Overall reign number
Reign	Reign number for the specific champion
Days	Number of days held

No.	Champion	Championship change			Reign statistics		Notes	Ref.
No.	Champion	Date	Event	Location	Reign	Days	Notes	Ref.
1	Shane Sinclair	17 March 2016	Fight For Gold (2016)	Invercargill	1	93	Shane Sinclair won a 6 man tournament, defeating Marcus Kool & T-Rex in the tournament final.	
—	Vacated	18 June 2016	—	—	—	—	Shane Sinclair had to vacate the title due to being present for the birth of his first child.	
2	Marcus Kool	15 July 2016	Southern Rumble (2016)	Invercargill	1	224	Marcus Kool defeated T-Rex in a Southland Street Fight for the vacant title.	
3	T-Rex	24 February 2017	Fight For Gold (2017)	Invercargill	1	246	T-Rex cashed in his Fight for Gold contract and defeated Marcus Kool.	
4	JK Moody	28 October 2017	Halloween Haunting (2017)	Invercargill	1	259	JK Moody defeated T-Rex.	
5	Kane Khan	14 July 2018	Southern Rumble (2018)	Invercargill	1	<1	Kane Khan defeated JK Moody in a TLC match.	
6	Will Power	14 July 2018	Southern Rumble (2018)	Invercargill	1	105	Will Power defeated Kane Khan.	
7	Kane Khan	27 October 2018	Halloween Haunting (2018)	Invercargill	2	140	Kane Khan defeated Will Power.	
8	Marcus Kool	16 March 2019	Queenstown Wrestlefest (2019)	Queenstown	2	119	Marcus Kool defeated Kane Khan.	
9	Slex	13 July 2019	Southern Rumble (2019)	Invercargill	1	105	Slex defeated Marcus Kool	
10	Shane Sinclair	26 October 2019	Halloween Haunting (2019)	Invercargill	2	287	Defeated Marcus Kool and Slex in a Triple Threat Elimination match.	
11	Jamie Tagataese	8 August 2020	Southern Rumble - Night 2 (2020)	Invercargill	1	364	Won the 20 Man Southern Rumble match the previous night, earning a championship match against Shane Sinclair. Jamie Tagataese went on to defeat Shane Sinclair in a singles match.	
12	Will Power	7 August 2021	Southern Rumble (2021)	Invercargill	2	637	Will Power defeated Jamie Tagataese.	
13	K9	6 May 2023	Battlelines (2023)	Invercargill	3	175	K9 defeated Will Power in a Last Man Standing Match.	
14	Cool Guy Sky	28 October 2023	Halloween Haunting (2023)	Invercargill	1	364	Cool Guy Sky defeated K9	
15	Azza	26 October 2024	Halloween Haunting (2024)	Invercargill	1	287	Azza cashed in the Fight for Gold Briefcase after Sky was assaulted by the Black Light District following his title defence in the main event. Azza successfully pinned Sky to become the new champion	
16	Cool Guy Sky	9 August 2025	Southern Rumble (2025)	Invercargill	2	214+	Cool Guy Sky defeated Azza	

===== List of combined reigns =====
Rank	Champion	No. of reigns	Combined days
1	Will Power	2	742
2	Shane Sinclair	2	380
3	Jamie Tagataese	1	364
4	Marcus Kool	2	343
5	JK Moody	1	259
6	T-Rex	1	246
7	K9/Kane Khan	3	157+
8	Slex	1	105

=== SPW New Zealand Tag Team Championship ===
SPW New Zealand Tag Team Championship

Details
- Promotion: Southern Pro Wrestling
- Date established: 3 March 2018
- Current champions: Black Light District (Saboor & Corey Beams)
Statistics
- First champions: NZXT (Mason Daniels & Michael Richards)
- Longest reign: THE NZ MEGA POWERS (Cool Guy Sky & Will Power) (764 days)
- Shortest reign: NZXT (Mason Daniels & Michael Richards) (49 days)

The SPW New Zealand Tag Team Championship is the top professional wrestling tag team championship title in the New Zealand promotion Southern Pro Wrestling (SPW). The inaugural champions were NZXT (Mason Daniels & Michael Richards), who defeated the CruiserMates (Falcon Kid & Liam Fury) at the 2018 Fight For Gold event in Invercargill.

==== Title history ====
Key
No.	Overall reign number
Reign	Reign number for the specific champion
Days	Number of days held

No.	Champion	Championship change			Reign statistics		Notes	Ref.
No.	Champion	Date	Event	Location	Reign	Days	Notes	Ref.
1	NZXT (Mason Daniels & Michael Richards)	3 March 2018	Fight For Gold (2018)	Invercargill	1	49	NZXT defeated Down to Fight to become the inaugural champions.	
2	CruiserMates (Falcon Kid & Liam Fury)	21 April 2018	Battle Lines (2018)	Invercargill	1	217	CruiserMates defeated NZXT.	
3	Detention (Ryder & Sky)	24 November 2018	Fight Nights 10	Invercargill	1	161	Detention w/Professor Palmer defeated CruiserMates.	
4	Deadly Sins (JK Moody & Kane Khan)	4 May 2019	Battle Lines (2019)	Invercargill	1	112	Deadly Sins defeated Detention.	
—	Vacated	24 August 2019	Fight Nights 12	—	—	—	Deadly Sins moved from SPW to seek out opportunities abroad. As a result of being unable to defend the titles, they were forced to vacate them.	
5	Power Tools (Will Power & Hammer)	26 October 2019	Halloween Haunting (2019)	Invercargill	1	140	Power Tools defeated Detention in the tag team tournament final.	
6	CTRL (Carnage & Jake Shehaan)	14 March 2020	Queenstown WrestleFest (2020)	Queenstown	1	328	CTRL defeated Will Power & "Human Love Machine" T-Rex	
7	THE NZ MEGA POWERS (Cool Guy Sky & Will Power)	5 February 2021	Fight For Gold - Night 1 (2021)	Invercargill	1	764	THE NZ MEGA POWERS defeated CTRL Jake Sheehan & Carnage	
8	The Golden Light (James Shaw & Ryder)	11 March 2023	Fight For Gold (2023)	Invercargill	1	511	The Golden Light defeated THE NZ MEGA POWERS	
9	Black Light District (Saboor & Corey Beams)	3 August 2024	Southern Rumble (2024)	Invercargill	1	371	Black Light District defeated The Golden Light	
10	King & Crosscheck (Micheal Richards & Nico Bell)	9 August 2025	Southern Rumble (2025)	Invercargill	1	210	King & Crosscheck defeated the Black Light District in a Triple Tag match that included Jamie Tagataese and Pat Schisk.	
11	Hammer & Will Power	7 March 2026	Fight for Gold (2026)	Invercargill	2	4+	Hammer & Will Power defeated King & Crosscheck	

== Southern Rumble History ==
The Southern Rumble is SPW's biggest event. A Southern Rumble event has been held every year since 2016.

=== Southern Rumble (2016) ===
Southern Rumble (2016)
- Promotion: SPW
- Date: 15 July 2016
- City: Invercargill, New Zealand
- Venue: Invercargill Working Men's Club

Southern Rumble chronology
← Previous; First	Next → 2017

No.	Results	Stipulations
1	Brook Duncan defeated Curt Chaos (w/Miss Rivers)	Singles match
2	No Face defeated Liger	Singles match
3	Will Power defeated Hammer	Singles match
4	The Deadly Sins (JK Moody & Kane Khan) defeated Privileged (Charlie Roberts & Curtis Castlewood)	Tag team match
5	Slade Mercer defeated 13 others to win the Southern Rumble	Southern Rumble match to determine the number one contender for the SPW New Zealand Championship
6	Marcus Kool defeated T-Rex	Southland Street Fight for the vacant SPW New Zealand Championship

=== Southern Rumble (2017) ===
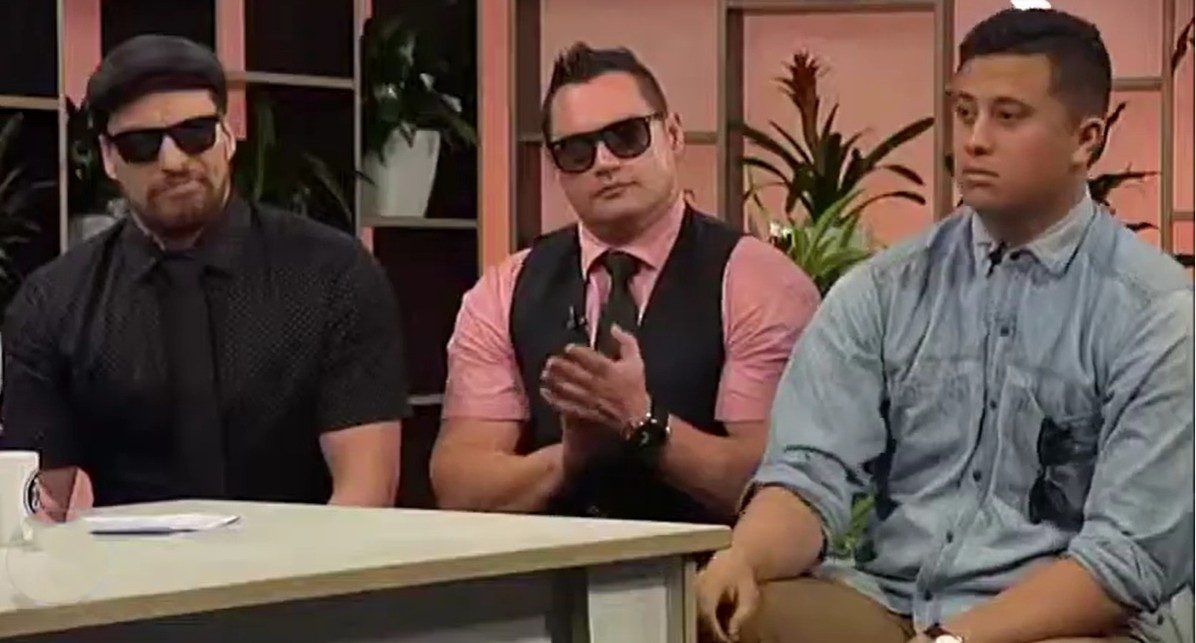
Southern Pro Wrestling Dapper Agent Kingi, Vinny Dunn, TK Cooper in July 2017

Southern Rumble (2017)
- Promotion: SPW
- Date: 22 July 2017
- City: Invercargill, New Zealand
- Venue: Invercargill Working Men's Club

Southern Rumble chronology
← Previous; 2016	Next → 2018

No.	Results	Stipulations
1	Will Ospreay defeated Shane Sinclair	Singles match
2	Hammer defeated Marcus Kool	Singles match
3	Bea Priestley defeated Ashlee Spencer	Singles match
4	TK Cooper defeated Taylor Adams	Singles match
5	T-Rex (c) defeated Jakob Cross	Singles match for the SPW New Zealand Championship
6	JK Moody defeated 19 others to win the Southern Rumble	Southern Rumble match to determine the number one contender for the SPW New Zealand Championship
(c) / – the champion(s) heading into the match

=== Southern Rumble (2018) ===
Southern Rumble (2018)
- Promotion: SPW
- Date: 14 July 2018
- City: Invercargill, New Zealand
- Venue: ILT Stadium
- Attendance: 1,200+

Southern Rumble chronology
← Previous; 2017	Next → 2019

No.	Results	Stipulations
1	Marcus Kool defeated Will Ospreay	Singles match
2	Tenille Dashwood defeated Bea Priestley	Singles match
3	CruiserMates (Falcon Kid & Luke Fury) (c) defeated NZXT (Mason Daniels & Michael Richards)	2 out of 3 falls tag team match for the SPW New Zealand Tag Team Championship
4	T-Rex defeated Gino Gambino	Singles match
5	Kane Khan defeated JK Moody (c)	Tables, ladders, and chairs match for the SPW New Zealand Championship
6	Will Power defeated Kane Khan (c)	Singles match for the SPW New Zealand Championship (Fight for Gold cash-in match)
7	Kane Khan defeated 19 others to win the Southern Rumble	20-man Southern Rumble match to determine the number one contender for the SPW New Zealand Championship
(c) / – the champion(s) heading into the match

=== Southern Rumble (2019) ===
Southern Rumble (2019)
- Promotion(s): SPW; MCW
- Date: 13 July 2019 (aired 24 August 2019 on TVNZ Duke)
- City: Invercargill, New Zealand
- Venue: ILT Stadium
- Attendance: 1,200+

Southern Rumble chronology
← Previous; 2018	Next → Southern Rumble - Night (2020)

No.	Results	Stipulations
1	Falcon Kid defeated Kingi	Singles match
2	Will Power defeated Gino Gambino	Singles match
3	Lochy Hendricks defeated Shane Sinclair	Singles match
4	Kellyanne defeated Indi Hartwell	Singles match
5	Deadly Sins (JK Moody & Kane Khan) (c) defeated The South Pacific Power Trip (TK Cooper & Travis Banks)	Tag team match for the SPW New Zealand Tag Team Championship
6	T-Rex defeated Dowie James	Southland Street Fight
7	Slex (c) defeated Marcus Kool (c)	Winner Takes All match for the SPW New Zealand Championship and the MCW World Heavyweight Championship
8	JK Moody defeated 19 others to win the Southern Rumble	20-man Southern Rumble match to determine the number one contender for the SPW New Zealand Championship
(c) / – the champion(s) heading into the match

=== Southern Rumble (2020) ===
Southern Rumble - Night 1 (2020)
- Promotion: SPW
- Date: 7 August 2020
- City: Invercargill, New Zealand
- Venue: Invercargill Workingmen's Club

Southern Rumble chronology
← Previous; 2019	Next → Southern Rumble - Night 2 (2020)

No.	Results	Stipulations
1	TK Cooper defeated Will Power	Singles match
2	Jake Shehaan (w/Amber Saint) defeated Cam Kaiba	Singles match
3	Rangi defeated Charlie Roberts	Singles match
4	T-Rex defeated Marcus Kool	Singles match
5	Shane Sinclair (c) defeated NIWA	Singles match for the SPW New Zealand Heavyweight Championship
6	Jamie Tagataese defeated 19 others to win the Southern Rumble	20-man Southern Rumble match to determine the number one contender for the SPW New Zealand Championship
(c) / – the champion(s) heading into the match

Southern Rumble - Night 2 (2020)
- Promotion: SPW
- Date: 8 August 2020
- City: Invercargill, New Zealand
- Venue: Invercargill Workingmen's Club

Southern Rumble chronology
← Previous; Southern Rumble - Night 1 (2020)	Next → Southern Rumble (2021)

No.	Results	Stipulations
1	Will Power defeated T-Rex	Singles match
2	Charlie Roberts defeated Albino Rhino	Singles match
3	CTRL (c) defeated Cool Guy Sky & NIWA, Detention and Rangi & Vinny Dunn	Fatal Four Way Tag Team Elimination Match for the SPW New Zealand Tag Team Championships
4	Cam Kaiba defeated Liam Fury	Southland Street Fight
5	Marcus Kool defeated TK Cooper	Singles Match
6	Hammer defeated Professor Palmer	Singles Match
7	Jamie Tagataese defeated Shane Sinclair (c)	Singles Match for the SPW New Zealand Heavyweight Championship
(c) / – the champion(s) heading into the match

=== Southern Rumble (2021) ===
Southern Rumble (2021)
- Promotion: SPW
- Date: 7 August 2021
- City: Invercargill, New Zealand
- Venue: Invercargill Workingmen's Club

Southern Rumble chronology
← Previous; Southern Rumble - Night 2 (2020)	Next → —

No.	Results	Stipulations
1	THE NZ MEGA POWERS (c) defeated the Knights of Mayhem (w/Sabrina)	Tag Team Match for the SPW New Zealand Tag Team Championships
2	Jaxon Cross defeated Hammer	Singles match
3	T-Rex defeated Charlie Roberts	Singles match
4	NIWA defeated Marcus Kool	Dog Collar Chain Match
5	K9 defeated 19 others to win the Southern Rumble	20-man Southern Rumble match to determine the number one contender for the SPW New Zealand Championship
6	Will Power defeated Jamie Tagataese (c)	Singles Match for the SPW New Zealand Heavyweight Championship
(c) / – the champion(s) heading into the match

== Television and streaming ==
SPW programming is available in New Zealand on the TV channel, TVNZ Duke available on Freeview, Sky and Vodafone TV. Additionally, SPW shows are available online through TVNZ OnDemand (Not currently as of 13/08/2022). Furthermore, SPW provides a subscription video on demand service SPW On Demand with standalone Android and iOS apps, as well as via Pivotshare.

== See also ==
- Professional wrestling in New Zealand
- List of professional wrestling promotions in New Zealand
