= Ernie Leonard =

New Zealand television presenter

Ernie Leonard (1931 – 15, July 1994) was a New Zealand television presenter, wrestling commentator, and actor. He was well known to wrestling fans.

== Background ==
Leonard was born in Marton, New Zealand in 1931. The son of an Anglican minister, he was of Ngāti Rangiwewehi and Rangitāne descent. Along with Steve Rickard, he co-hosted and commentated for the wrestling show, On the Mat. During his career, he worked with people such as producer Ngaire Fuata. In 1986, he recruited Whai Ngata to start up the Māori department on Television New Zealand.

== Acting roles ==
In 1966 Leonard appeared in the film Don't Let It Get You, which was directed by John O'Shea. At the time, Leonard was employed as the public relations officer in Rotorua.

Leonard played the part of Charlie Rata, a core character in the ground-breaking TV series Pukemanu, which ran from 1971 to 1972.

== Television ==
Leonard secured the position of head of the Maori Programmes Department for TVNZ during the mid-1980s. He was the first person to hold that position. In 1982 he became the producer of Koha the TVNZ programme on Māori culture and history.

He worked on two films about the exhibition Te Maori which showcased Māori art in New York in 1984: Koha - Te Māori Guard, New York and Koha - Te Māori, a Cloak of Words.

== Death ==
Leonard died at age 62 on 15 July 1994 following a short battle with cancer.

== Filmography ==
=== Actor ===
Year	Title	Role	Type
1966	Don't Let It Get You	Himself	Feature film
1971-72	Pukemanu	Charlie Rata	TV series
1975-81	On The Mat	Presenter	TV wrestling show (also producer 1981-84)
1984	A Big Country presents Kiwis	Himself	TV documentary series

=== Crew ===
Year	Title	Role	Type
1993	Radio Wha Waho	Executive Producer	TV comedy series
