= Off the Ropes =

- Created by: KPW
- Starring: KPW wrestlers and staff
- Country of origin: New Zealand

Production
- Running time: Approx. 28 mins per episode (plus commercials)

Original release
- Network: Prime TV
- Release: 15 November 2009 – 7 February 2010

Off the Ropes is a professional wrestling television program for Kiwi Pro Wrestling (KPW). The show debuted on Prime TV in New Zealand on 15 November 2009.

== Show history ==
In October 2009, KPW announced the launch of a flagship TV show on its website and that the show was to be named Off the Ropes. Later that month, the commencement date and transmission time of the show were announced.

KPW management made the decision to name the show Off the Ropes so that the title format would be similar to Steve Rickard's famous New Zealand professional wrestling TV programme On The Mat, broadcast some 25 years earlier.

The show is significant in New Zealand professional wrestling history in that Off the Ropes is the first show featuring New Zealand professional wrestling to be broadcast on a nationally available free-to-air television channel since On The Mat ceased transmission by South Pacific Pictures circa 1984.

Off the Ropes began transmission of its 13-episode first season on Sunday 15 November 2009.

== Show format ==
The show aired every Sunday at 1:30 pm – 2:00pm on Prime Television New Zealand, a free-to air national television network. Each episode was approximately 24 minutes in length (produced for a 30-minute time-slot) and featured usually two matches (two singles matches, or one singles match and one tag team match), wrestler interviews in the Backstage Pass segment hosted by KPW staff member Ilex Bell, and backstage vignettes that reveal more of the wrestlers' personality and motivations.

== On-air performers ==
=== Champions ===
==== KPW Heavyweight Championship ====
Wrestler	Defeated	Date	Place	Event	Notes
H-Flame	Jonnie Juice	21 July 2006	Taitā, Lower Hutt	Eruption	Tournament final for the vacant championship
Inferno	H-Flame	13 December 2009	Wellington	Off the Ropes	Episode broadcast 13 Dec 2009
Max Damage	Inferno	31 January 2010	Wellington	Off the Ropes	Episode broadcast 31 Jan 2010
The Technician	Max Damage	16 July 2010	Wellington	Make Or Break	

==== KPW Tag Team Championship ====
Team	Defeated	Date	Place	Event	Notes
The Renegades (The Technician and Kade Morgan "3G")	Whetu and Jade Diamond	8 May 2009	Newtown, Wellington	Rise of the Champions	Tournament final for the vacant championship

=== Authority figures ===
- KPW CEO Rip Morgan
- KPW GM Terry the Golden Greek
- Mr Rumble

=== Referees ===
- Head Referee Daniel Martins
- Mark Freemantle

=== Commentators ===
- Blair the Flair
- The Wonderful Wilba Force

=== Recurring segments ===
Backstage Pass, host by Ilex Bell

== Appearances in other media ==
=== Print and other media ===
Off the Ropes was previewed and promoted in the National Business Review on 25 September 2009, the Otago Daily Times on 6 October 2009 and also on 13 October 2009, the New Zealand TV Guide on 5 November 2009, the Truth on 13 November 2009, the Herald on 14 November 2009 and also on and 25 September 2009, the New Zealand Listener on 14 November 2009, The Sunday Star-Times on 15 November 2009 and the Sunday News on 15 November 2009.

Off the Ropes was also promoted on the New Zealand website Throng on 25 September 2009 and on 15 November 2009.

=== Wrestlers' interviews ===
KPW mainstay H-Flame was also the subject of a cover story for the internationally distributed Fire & Rescue, the official New Zealand Fire service magazine, and was also featured in the Wanganui Chronicle on 6 November 2009, and the New Zealand Herald on 2 November 2009.

KPW wrestler the Technician was interviewed by the Waikato Times on 11 November 2009.

KPW wrestler Jade Diamond was interviewed by The Northern Advocate on 3 November 2009.

== See also ==
- List of professional wrestling television series
