= Jason Conlan =

New Zealand cartoonist

- Born: 1971 (age 54–55); New Zealand
- Known for: Cartoonist
- Notable work: "On the Mat" comic strip 1995–present

Jason Conlan (born 1971) is a New Zealand cartoonist, best known under the pseudonym Mister J, who is the creator of Pro Wrestling Illustrated's monthly cartoon strip "On the Mat". He has also contributed to the similar Australian wrestling publication Piledriver and long-running newsletter Wrestling Then and Now as well as professional wrestling websites ProWrestlingDaily.com and Bill Apter's 1wrestling.com. Conlan has also done work for the online version of The Sun, the most-read daily newspaper in the United Kingdom.

== Biography ==
=== Early life and influences ===
Jason Conlan developed an interest in drawing and professional wrestling as a child. As early as the age of six, he began watching Steve Rickard's NWA-affiliated promotion All Star Pro-Wrestling and its wrestling programme On the Mat. He became an avid fan of the show and was encouraged to begin drawing some of the wrestlers he saw such as Baron Von Krupp. After On the Mat was cancelled in 1984, Conlan started reading Pro Wrestling Illustrated and began following professional wrestling in the United States. Though he enjoyed WWF Superstars of Wrestling when it debuted in New Zealand in 1987, the country's first regular American wrestling show, Conlan favoured the National Wrestling Alliance, specifically Jim Crockett Promotions, partly due to being a fan of the NWA-friendly "Apter mags" and found its wrestlers more interesting to draw.

Conlan continued developing his artistic talent, carefully studying comic book art, newspaper comic strips, and political cartoons, and started selling his own drawings while a high school student. Conlan also had a regular spot in his local newspaper. He considered attending art school but found it "to be boring and expensive".

=== Pro Wrestling Illustrated ===
Conlan was working part-time in a comic book store when he first contacted the offices of Pro Wrestling Illustrated via cold calling in 1995. His first call was "politely declined" but had better luck two weeks later and was put through to then editor Bill Apter. He had previously worked on the Australian wrestling magazine Piledriver and the Wrestling Then and Now newsletter, however, it was his work for PWI which would give him his first big break. After two months of negotiations, he accepted an offer from publisher Stu Saks to draw a monthly cartoon in addition to 30 full-page cartoons for their wrestling annual. He would eventually go on to illustrate all of Saks' wrestling magazines.

His comic strip On the Mat, named in honour of the wrestling programme Conlan watched as a child, debuted later that year and continues to appear in PWI as of 2010. Conlan, also employed at a bookstore, is also a contributing artist for professional wrestling websites ProWrestlingDaily.com and 1wrestling.com, the latter owned by Bill Apter. He has also contributed to the online version of The Sun, the most widely read daily newspaper in the United Kingdom, which also carries artwork from On the Mat for its sports columns.

=== Recent years ===
A member of the Australian Webcomics Collective, Conlan has also drawn art for the long-running Australian comic anthology series DeeVee. In July 2007, his comic strip "Mister J and the Pirates" appeared in DeeVee 2007 alongside work from Eddie Campbell, Jeffrey Brown, Mandy Ord, Jason Paulos, Daren White, David Tang, Matt "Stikman" Huynh, Daniel Best, Andy Finlayson, Daniel Gibbs and Lee Slattery.

== Reception ==
Conlan's work has garnered some interest from within the wrestling industry. When World Championship Wrestling was touring New Zealand during its final years, he sent some of his artwork to their office and was invited to meet some of the wrestlers during the tour. Scott Steiner, he was told, had expressed some negative comments towards a caricature he had done of Steiner and was warned to stay away from him during the tour. The popular Mexican luchadore Puma had the opposite reaction praising Conlan and commenting "When I saw myself [in the PWI comic strip] I thought I might as well just retire right there. It just doesn't get any better than that." In recent years, Conlan has expressed an interest in having his artwork commissioned by World Wrestling Entertainment, as many of his favourite caricatures are of WWE superstars, such as illustrating a daily cartoon for WWE.com.
