= Tommy Seigler =

American professional wrestler (1938–2023)

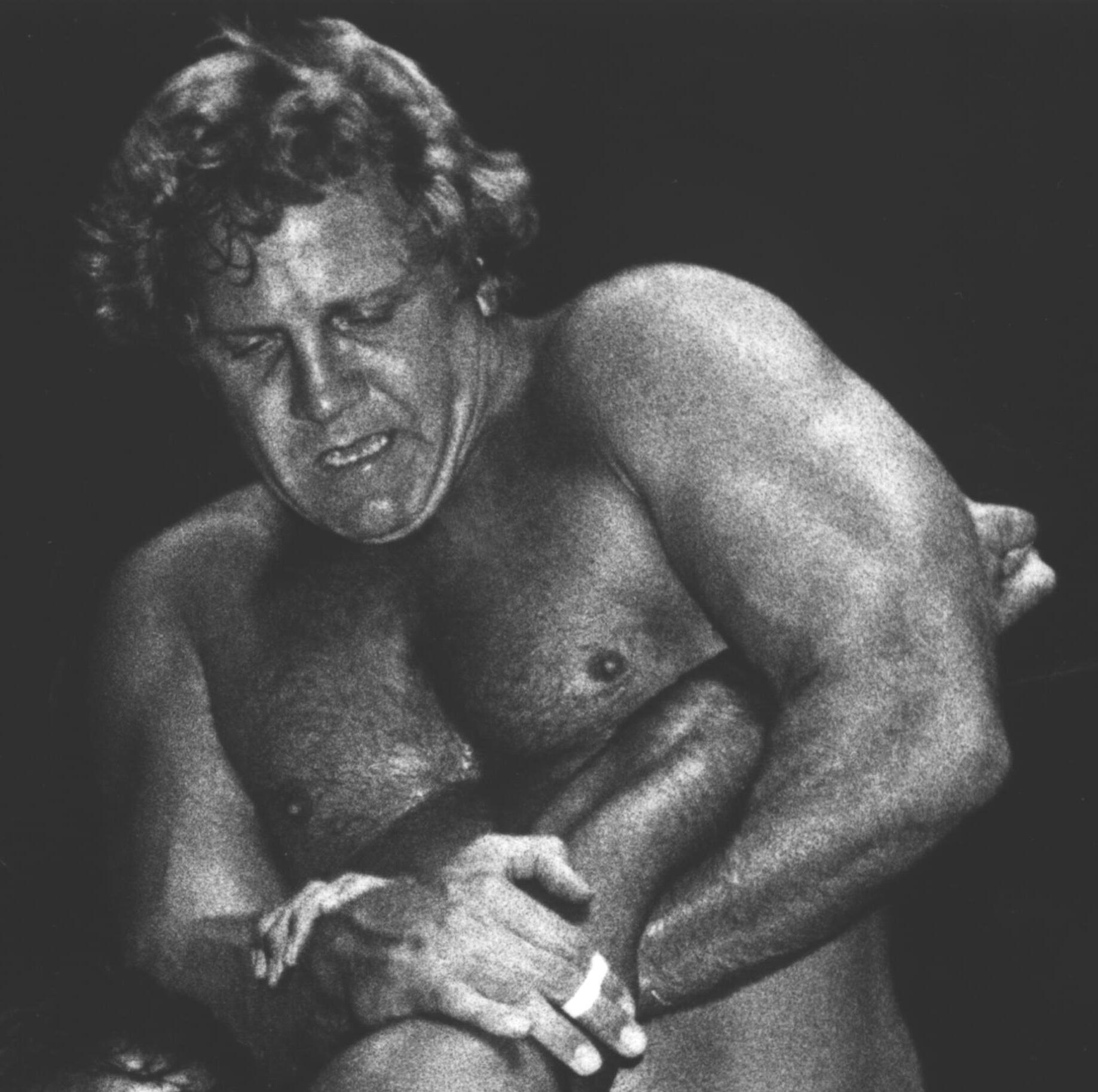
- Seigler, c. 1977

Personal information
- Born: Thomas Edward Seigler Jr. September 24, 1938 Fieldale, Virginia, U.S.
- Died: July 25, 2023 (aged 84)

Professional wrestling career
- Ring name: Tommy Seigler
- Billed height: 6 ft 1 in (185 cm)
- Billed weight: 230 lb (104 kg)
- Debut: 1963
- Retired: 1978

Thomas Edward Seigler Jr. (September 24, 1938 – July 25, 2023) was an American professional wrestler. Better known as Tommy Seigler, he held multiple wrestling titles including the NWA British Commonwealth Heavyweight Championship, the NWA Southeastern Television Championship, the NWA Florida Television Championship, the NWA Southern Tag Team Championship, and the NWA Macon Tag Team Championship.

== Early life ==
Tommy Seigler was born to Thomas and Clare Seigler in Fieldale, Virginia. Moving back to South Carolina after birth, Tommy was raised in Anderson. Upon entering high school, his family moved to Iva, South Carolina, where Tommy attended Iva High School. There he competed in football, basketball, and baseball, and was selected as an all-conference basketball player. Upon graduating in 1956, Seigler moved to Flint, Michigan to work in a car factory, but returned to South Carolina a year later. He began working in the construction industry with his father, where he became a master pipefitter.

== Professional wrestling career (1963-1978) ==
In 1963, while on a construction job in Pensacola, Florida, Seigler began working out at a local gym where he was noticed by some local wrestlers who convinced him to give wrestling a try. Seigler began training and only wrestled part-time, while continuing to work in construction. After six years of part-time wrestling, he decided to make it his full-time career.

On June 24, 1972, Seigler wrestled George Scott at the Parade of Champions supercard put on by Fritz von Erich at Texas Stadium in Irving, Texas. On November 14, 1972, Seigler, and his partner Argentina Apollo, defeated Skandor Akbar and Rocket Monroe to win the NWA Macon Tag Team Championship before departing for All-South Wrestling Alliance.

In July 1973, Seigler defeated Ox Baker to win the All-South Wrestling Georgia Television Championship. Later that year, he and Super Gladiator defeated Rock Hunter and Assassin#2 to win the All-South Wrestling Alliance Georgia Tag Team Championship. On October 10, 1975, Seigler, and his partner Charlie Cook, defeated The Interns in Nashville, Tennessee to win the NWA Southern Tag Team Championship, later known as the AWA Southern Tag Team Championship. On November 11, 1975, he defeated Rock Hunter to become the NWA Southeastern Television Champion, a title he held twice. On October 19, 1976, he defeated The Missouri Mauler to win the NWA Florida Television Championship. In 1977, he was named the Wrestling Fans International Association Wrestler of the Year. Also in 1977, Seigler defeated The Iron Sheik (Ali Vaziri) to win the NWA British Commonwealth Heavyweight Championship, which he held until his retirement in 1978.

Seigler was known for his calm manner in the ring. He rejected the flamboyant costumes and theatrics often associated with professional wrestlers, and once said, "Having a gimmick doesn't change your ability, it just draws more attention to you." He estimated throughout his career he often drove more than 2,000 miles per week to wrestle six days a week.

Throughout his career, Seigler worked for the National Wrestling Alliance (NWA), All-South Wrestling Alliance, Championship Wrestling from Florida (CWF), Georgia Championship Wrestling (GCW), Mid-Atlantic Championship Wrestling, World Class Championship Wrestling (WCCW). He wrestled around the world in places such as Australia, New Zealand, England, South Africa, and Singapore.

Seigler's career was cut short in December 1977, when he ruptured three disks in his lower back while wrestling The Iron Sheik in Singapore. After having the disks fused together, he tried to rehabilitate and return to the ring, but was forced to retire in 1978. Seigler continued to appear at wrestling matches from time to time in guest appearances, but never returned to the ring.

== Law enforcement career ==
After retiring from professional wrestling, Seigler returned home to Anderson, South Carolina, where he was active in local law enforcement for two decades. In December 2019, he retired from his position as the head of security for the Historic Anderson County Courthouse.

== Personal life and death ==
Seigler had four children and seven grandchildren. He continued to work out daily, having a personal gym of his own with over 4,000 pounds of weights.

Seigler died on July 25, 2023, at the age of 84.
