= Siva Afi =

Samoan professional wrestler (1949–2026)

Personal information
- Born: Max Amata Taogaga; 28 April 1949 Samoa
- Died: 16 July 2026 (aged 77)

Professional wrestling career
- Ring names: Afi; Duke Kono; High Chief Afi; Maori Headshrinker; Max Tamboola; Siva Afi; Sivi Afi; Superfly Afi; Tattoo Samoa
- Billed height: 5 ft 10 in (178 cm)
- Billed weight: 240 lb (109 kg)
- Billed from: Samoa
- Trained by: Peter Maivia; Steve Rickard
- Debut: 1974
- Retired: 1997

Papali'itele Max Amata Taogaga (28 April 1949 – 16 July 2026) was a Samoan professional wrestler. He is best known for his appearances with the World Wrestling Federation (WWF) in the late-1980s under the ring name Siva Afi.

== Early life ==
Max Taogaga was born in Samoa on 28 April 1949. He attended Avele Agricultural College in Apia. As a young man, he relocated to New Zealand where he worked in a slaughterhouse.

== Professional wrestling career ==
=== Early career (1974–1978) ===
After deciding to become a professional wrestler, Taogaga went to Steve Rickard and Peter Maivia who trained him for two years. In his debut match in 1974, Taogaga defeated one of New Zealand's top light heavyweights, Del Adams. For the next four years Taogaga continued to work his way up through the ranks, wrestling the majority of foreign visitors to the country. Finally in 1978 he earned his big break, defeating Big John Da Silva in the final of an elimination tournament to decide the new, New Zealand Heavyweight Champion. Over the next few months, Taogaga successfully defended the title before heading to the U.S. at the end of 1978.

=== International appearances (1978–1986) ===
For the next seven years Taogaga split his time between the U.S., Canada, New Zealand, Australia and Japan. However, it was in Hawaii that Taogaga would be the most successful. It was here, in 1985, where he wrestled Ric Flair to a one-hour time limit draw for the NWA World Heavyweight Championship in front of 12,000 people.

=== World Wrestling Federation (1986–1988) ===
In January 1986, Taogaga signed with Vince McMahon's World Wrestling Federation (WWF), making his debut on 23 January at a house show in Anaheim, CA in a win over Tim Patterson. He would later make his debut on Prime Time Wrestling on March 1 defeating Rene Goulet, where he was billed as "'Superfly' Afi" and deemed to be the cousin of Jimmy Snuka. On the 8 March episode of The Body Shop, Afi was introduced to viewers of WWF All Star Wrestling as Snuka's cousin. Afi was undefeated initially, albeit against lower-level competition such as Rene Goulet, Barry O, Ron Shaw, and Matt Borne. On 6 March 1986 he gained his first significant victory when he pinned Bret Hart at a house show in Buffalo, NY.

Afi's undefeated streak ended three days later when he lost to Hart's partner Jim Neidhart in Landover, MD, but he continued to be pushed. Afi gained victories in April over Hercules Hernandez and Paul Roma. However fans were unaccepting of Afi as the replacement for the departed Jimmy Snuka, and openly heckled him in matches. He began to slide down the card, losing that spring to Bret Hart, Don Muraco, and Jake Roberts. By the summer all momentum had ceased. Now billed as "Sivi Afi", he became a near enhancement talent and lost to the likes of Bret Hart, Randy Savage, Harley Race and Ted DiBiase. In the summer of 1986, he was briefly referred to as "Toma". He formed a short-lived tag-team with King Tonga, but the duo was generally unsuccessful. He also teamed with Ricky Steamboat, Tony Atlas and Billy Jack Haynes but went nowhere.

Taogaga entered 1987 firmly established as an upper-level enhancement star, losing regularly to Hercules and others but continuing to gain victories against other opening-level talent such as Frenchy Martin and Terry Gibbs. He was used frequently as a substitute when other wrestlers could not make house shows, teaming with others such as Raymond Rougeau. In the summer of 1987, he entered a lengthy losing streak, falling to preliminary competition such as Steve Lombardi and Frenchy Martin. Following a loss to Ted Dibiase on 9 December at a Wrestling Challenge taping in Fort Myers, Taogaga went on a hiatus.

In 1988, after teaming for a short time with Haku as one half of The Islanders, he also wrestled in six-man tags with the original Islanders, Haku and Tama. He debuted a new gimmick, that of "High Chief Afi", a Samoan chieftain. As part of his gimmick, Taogaga had gotten his legs and abdomen heavily tattooed (ala High Chief Peter Maivia). Unfortunately for Taogaga, it was all for naught; Tama would shortly thereafter depart from the WWF and Haku was repackaged as "King Haku" to replace the injured Harley Race, leaving Taogaga without a team or manager. His last match came on 27 August 1988 in Burlington, VT against S. D. Jones. Taogaga left the WWF and went on to work for Burt Reynolds as a stuntman and bodyguard.

=== Late career (1988–1997) ===
Taogaga made his return to New Zealand in 1990 to appear for Steve Rickard's "The Main Event". Taogaga defeated all comers during the short-lived show, becoming the new Commonwealth Heavyweight Champion in the process. After the cancellation of "The Main Event", Taogaga resumed touring the world appearing in areas as far flung as Palestine, Israel, England, Germany, and Africa. In 1991 Siva found Jeff Miller aka The Metal Maniac, realizing his gift of gab and athletic ability. Siva broke Metal Maniac into pro wrestling, training him in the basics and securing a spot to travel and work with Superfly Jimmy Snuka.

In 1997, after over 23 years on the road, Taogaga retired from the sport, wrestling his final match in South Africa.

== Personal life and death ==
Upon receiving a traditional pe'a, Taogaga adopted the honorific Papali'itele.

In October 1997, Taogaga was indicted by the Cuyahoga County, Ohio Grand Jury for acting as the "getaway driver" for a robbery, burglary and kidnapping carried out in January 1996. He was subsequently convicted of one count of aggravated burglary, two counts of aggravated robbery, and seven counts of kidnapping, and sentenced to 15 to 40 years' incarceration. Following a series of appeals against his original sentence, Taogaga was released from the North Central Correctional Institution in 2007 and deported back to Samoa.

In 2008, Taogaga published his autobiography, Dance with Fire.

On 16 July 2026, Taogaga's family announced that he had died at the age of 77.

== Bibliography ==
- "Dance with Fire" (2008)

== Championships and accomplishments ==
- 50th State Big Time Wrestling
  - NWA Hawaii Heavyweight Championship (1 time)
  - NWA Pacific International Championship (1 time, final)
  - NWA Polynesian Pacific Heavyweight Championship (1 time, first)
- All Star Pro Wrestling
  - NWA British Empire/Commonwealth Championship (1 time)
- National Wrestling Alliance
  - NWA North American Heavyweight Championship (1 time)
- NWA New Zealand
  - NWA New Zealand Heavyweight Championship (1 time)
- Pro Wrestling Illustrated
  - PWI ranked him # 384 of the 400 best singles wrestlers of the PWI's WWE Top 400 in 2003
- United States Wrestling League
  - USWL Tag Team Championship (1 time) – with King Kaluha
