= NWA British Empire/Commonwealth Championship =

New Zealand professional wrestling championship

Details
- Promotion: Dominion Wrestling Union (1929–1953); All Star Pro Wrestling (1968–1990)
Statistics
- First champion: George Walker
- Final champion: Siva Afi
- Most reigns: Steve Rickard

The New Zealand version of the NWA British Empire/Commonwealth Championship was a professional wrestling heavyweight championship defended in the National Wrestling Alliance-affiliated Dominion Wrestling Union from 1929 to 1953 and in All Star Pro Wrestling from 1968 to 1990. It was first won in 1929 by Canadian wrestler George Walker, who claimed the title upon his arrival in New Zealand, and defended the belt for seven years before leaving for a rival promotion in 1935. It was the second oldest championship after the NWA New Zealand Heavyweight Championship and had 36 officially recognized champions during its 60-year history.

== Title history ==
#	Order in reign history
Reign	The reign number for the specific set of wrestlers listed
Event	The event in which the title was won
—	Used for vacated reigns so as not to count it as an official reign
N/A	The information is not available or is unknown
+	Indicates the current reign is changing daily

=== Reigns ===
#	Wrestlers	Reign	Date	Days held	Location	Event	Notes	Ref.
1	George Walker	1	1929	N/A	New Zealand	Live event	Claims title upon arriving in New Zealand.	
2	Earl McCready	1	1935	N/A	New Zealand	Live event	McCready is recognized as champion after Walker leaves the Dominion Wrestling Union for a rival promotion; he later legitimised his claim to the title when he defeated Walker in Wellington on 9 November 1937.	
3	John Katan	1	8 July 1940	30	Wellington	Live event		
4	Lofty Blomfield	1	7 August 1940	33	Wellington	Live event		
5	John Katan	2	9 September 1940	15	Auckland	Live event		
6	Earl McCready	2	24 September 1940	N/A	Dunedin	Live event		
—	Vacated	—	1953	—	N/A	N/A	The championship is vacated when Earl McCready leaves New Zealand and the title subsequently remained inactive for the next 15 years.	
7	George Gordienko	1	1968	N/A	Auckland	Live event		
8	John Da Silva	1	18 March 1968	192	Auckland	Live event		
9	Gordon Nelson	1	1968	N/A	N/A	Live event		
10	John Da Silva	2	26 September 1968	1,253	Wellington	Live event		
11	Robert Bruce	1	2 March 1972	563	Upper Hutt	Live event		
12	John Da Silva	3	16 September 1973	177	New Plymouth	Live event		
13	Abdullah the Butcher	1	12 March 1974	N/A	N/A	Live event		
14	John Da Silva	4	1974	N/A	N/A	Live event		
15	Bulldog Brower	1	1974	N/A	N/A	Live event		
16	John Da Silva	5	1975	N/A	N/A	Live event		
17	Robert Bruce	2	1975	N/A	N/A	Live event		
18	John Da Silva	6	1976	N/A	N/A	Live event		
19	Don Muraco	1	1977	N/A	N/A	Live event		
20	King Curtis Iaukea	1	1977	N/A	N/A	Live event		
21	Rick Martel	1	26 May 1977	N/A	Auckland	Live event		
22	Ali Vaziri	1	1977	N/A	N/A	Live event		
23	Tommy Seigler	1	1977	N/A	N/A	Live event		
—	Vacated	—	1978	—	N/A	N/A	The championship is vacated when Seigler leaves New Zealand.	
24	Les Thornton	1	January 1978	N/A	N/A	Live event		
25	Chris Markoff	1	1978	N/A	N/A	Live event		
26	Ron Miller	1	1978	N/A	Auckland	Live event		
27	Jack Claybourne	2	April 1978	N/A	Australia	Live event		
28	Toru Tanaka	1	13 June 1978	9	Christchurch	Live event		
29	Steve Rickard	1	22 June 1978	28	Auckland	Live event		
30	Toru Tanaka	2	20 July 1978	28	Auckland	Live event		
31	Steve Rickard	2	17 August 1978	42	Auckland	Live event		
32	Mad Dog Martin	1	28 September 1978	N/A	Auckland	Live event		
33	Leo Burke	1	1979	N/A	N/A	Live event		
34	Rick Martel	2	19 March 1979	70	Auckland	Live event	Defeated Mad Dog Martin to win the vacant title.	
35	Ripper Collins	1	28 May 1979	84	Auckland	Live event		
36	Peter Maivia	1	20 August 1979	14	Auckland	Live event		
37	Mr. Fuji	1	3 September 1979	N/A	Auckland	Live event		
38	Rick Martel	3	N/A	N/A	N/A	Live event		
—	Vacated	—	1980	—	N/A	N/A	The championship is vacated when Martel leaves New Zealand.	
39	Ron Miller	2	May 1980	N/A	Australia	Live event	Won tournament.	
40	Larry O'Day	1	14 July 1980	14	Auckland	Live event		
41	Ron Miller	3	28 July 1980	93	Auckland	Live event		
42	Steve Rickard	3	29 October 1980	176	Auckland	Live event		
43	Jos LeDuc	1	23 April 1981	7	Auckland	Live event		
44	Mark Lewin	1	30 April 1981	70	Auckland	Live event		
45	Jos LeDuc	2	9 July 1981	35	Auckland	Live event		
46	Steve Rickard	4	13 August 1981	35	Auckland	Live event		
47	Butcher Brannigan	1	17 September 1981	7	Auckland	Live event		
48	Steve Rickard	5	24 September 1981	252	Auckland	Live event		
49	Baron Karl Von Krupp	1	3 June 1982	28	Auckland	Live event		
50	Steve Rickard	6	1 July 1982	70	Auckland	Live event		
51	Ox Baker	1	9 September 1982	N/A	Auckland	Live event		
52	Al Perez	1	September 1982	N/A	N/A	Live event		
53	King Kamata	1	7 October 1982	N/A	Auckland	Live event		
54	Al Perez	2	October 1982	N/A	Auckland	Live event		
55	Pat O'Connor	2	4 November 1982	N/A	Auckland	Live event		
—	Vacated	—	1983	—	N/A	N/A		
56	Butcher Brannigan	2	1983	N/A	N/A	Live event		
57	Ricky Rickard	1	1983	N/A	N/A	Live event		
58	Larry O'Day	2	1983	N/A	N/A	Live event		
59	Steve Rickard	7	1983	N/A	N/A	Live event		
60	Zar Mongol	1	1983	N/A	N/A	Live event		
61	Steve Rickard	8	1983	N/A	N/A	Live event		
—	Vacated	—	1983	—	N/A	N/A	The championship is vacated and remains inactive for several years.	
62	Siva Afi	1	13 July 1990	N/A	Auckland	Live event	Defeated Canadian Stockman in tournament final.	
—	Deactivated	—	1990	—	N/A	N/A	The title is retired.	

== See also ==
- List of National Wrestling Alliance championships
