= Scoop (website) =

New Zealand real-time news website

- Scoop logo
- Owner: Scoop Publishing Limited
- Editor: Alastair Thompson
- Website: www.scoop.co.nz
- Commercial: Yes
- Launched: 1999; 27 years ago

Scoop, a New Zealand Internet news site, is operated by Scoop Publishing Limited, a company owned by a non-profit charitable trust dedicated to public-interest journalism.

== Operational model ==
The website publishes many submitted news and press releases due to their permissive policy. Their website states: "If it's a press release issued in New Zealand, is legible, legal, sane, not hateful and not defamatory we will most probably publish it."

In addition to being a general news website, Scoop also contains sub-sites with specific foci: Wellington.scoop, which aggregates Wellington-specific news with editorial comment, and also Pacific.scoop which publishes Pacific-related news and is edited by Auckland University of Technology's Pacific Media Centre.

As of March 2012, the website claimed to receive 246,500 visitors and 614,500 page impressions per month. Scoop was ranked 3rd by Nielsen Net Ratings in their News Category.

== History ==
It was established in 1999 by Andrew McNaughton, Ian Llewellyn and Alastair Thompson.

In 2003, The Guardian wrote about the graphic images from the war in Iraq that were being published on Scoop, and described Scoop as "left wing".

=== Involvement with the Internet Party ===
Alastair Thompson resigned as Scoop's chief executive and editor on 15 January 2014 after it became known that he was to be the general secretary of the Internet Party. He also resigned as an associate member of the parliamentary press gallery, whose rules forbid members from lobbying for a political party, and as a steering committee member of the Aotearoa New Zealand Foundation for Public Interest Journalism (formerly the Scoop Foundation project). His resignation as interim general secretary of the Internet Party was then announced soon after, on 24 January. By 3 February Thompson had returned to Scoop, though not as Editor, and it was announced that journalist Gordon Campbell, who writes a column on the website, had been appointed editor of Scoop. On 5 March 2014 it was announced that Thompson had been reappointed as Editor, and Campbell had become Political Editor.

== Awards ==
Scoop has won several awards for their work as a news organisation, including three NZ Net awards in 2001, and two Computerworld awards (in 2003 and 2005). Scoop was also recognised in the Qantas Media Awards as a finalist for "Best News Site" in 2007.
