= NZ On Screen =

Showcase of New Zealand TV and film

- Company type: Nonprofit
- Website type: Online archive
- Available in: English
- Headquarters: Wellington, New Zealand
- Owners: NZ On Air, New Zealand Government
- Website: http://www.nzonscreen.com
- Commercial: No
- Launched: 2008
- Current status: Perpetual work-in-progress

NZ On Screen is a publicly funded online promotional showcase of New Zealand television and film. Funded by NZ On Air, it provides free worldwide access to NZ-produced television, film and music videos. Content is streamed and the webpages provide authoritative background information.

The site was launched in October 2008 and is updated constantly. It provides titles in full or as excerpts, with background notes, photographs and profiles of key cast and crew. All material is rights-cleared and there is some content now on the site that had not been seen since its mid-twentieth century screening.

The ScreenTalk section is a videoblog with interviews with people from the NZ television and film industry – including Florian Habicht, Rena Owen, Margaret Mahy, Vincent Ward and Sam Neill.

The site won a Qantas Media Award for Best Entertainment site in May 2009, and was finalist for Best Website Design.
