= Steve Rickard =

New Zealand professional wrestler (1929–2015)

Personal information
- Born: Sydney Mervin Batt; 3 September 1929 Napier, New Zealand
- Died: 5 April 2015 (aged 85) Queensland, Australia

Professional wrestling career
- Ring name(s): Steve Rickard; Young Kong; Devil Butcher
- Billed height: 6 ft 1 in (1.86 m)
- Billed weight: 264 lb (120 kg)
- Billed from: Wellington, New Zealand
- Debut: 1959
- Retired: 1989

Sydney Mervin "Merv" Batt (3 September 1929 – 5 April 2015), best known by his ring name Steve Rickard, was a New Zealand professional wrestler, trainer and promoter. As a wrestler, he traveled throughout the world during the 1960s and 1970s, often visiting countries where professional wrestling was unknown such as southeast Asia, and was one of the top competitors to come from New Zealand during that era. Rickard was a frequent opponent for many foreign wrestlers travelling overseas including NWA World Heavyweight Champions such as Jack Brisco, Dory Funk Jr., Harley Race and "The Nature Boy" Ric Flair. He also had high-profile matches with Karl Gotch, Killer Kowalski, The Destroyer, André the Giant, Abe Jacobs and King Kong as well.

He was a former NWA Australasian Heavyweight Champion, a 3-time NWA New Zealand Heavyweight Champion, and a record 8-time NWA British Empire/Commonwealth Champion. He and Mark Lewin were also the first NWA Australasian Tag Team Champions in the early 1980s.

Rickard is considered one of the most influential figures in New Zealand professional wrestling in the latter half of the 20th century. He took over the Dominion Wrestling Union after the death of founder Walter Miller in 1959 and ran it for two years. In 1962, he established All Star Pro Wrestling, also known as NWA New Zealand internationally, which eventually succeeded the DWU and remained the country's single major promotion for the next 30 years. He and Australian promoter Jim Barnett were responsible for bringing foreign wrestlers, especially from Canada and the United States, back to the Pacific region by the late 1960s. He was also the creator of On the Mat, one of the country's longest running sports programmes from 1975 to 1984, and its short-lived spin-off The Main Event in 1990.

Rickard was also a successful hotelier and businessman before and after his wrestling career, most notably, establishing one of the first gyms in Wellington and running the Hutt Park Hotel for 15 years. After his in-ring retirement in 1989, he remained involved in the wrestling industry. He served as President of the NWA during the early to mid-1990s first shared between himself, Howard Brody, Dennis Coralluzzo and Jim Crockett Jr. from 1993 to 1995, and alone from 1995 to 1996. He was also a one-time a director of the Cauliflower Alley Club and honoured by the organization in 1997.

== Early life and amateur career ==
Steve Rickard, born Sydney Mervin "Merv" Batt, grew up in Napier, New Zealand. He joined an amateur wrestling club at age 14, and left school that same year to work three jobs to help support his mother, younger brother Eddy and sister Val. As a young man, he joined the New Zealand Police force in Napier and later transferred to Wellington where he worked as a police detective with the Criminal Investigation Branch. He eventually left the police force and bought the Hutt Park Hotel which he owned for the next 15 years.

Rickard started competing as an amateur wrestler in Napier during the 1940s, wrestling in the national championships New Zealand wide, and later began training wrestlers himself. According to Rickard, he "used to train the wrestlers and get some place or another where you could put a mat down" before building his own facility though "the conditions generally were not very good at all". Rickard continued his training in Wellington and eventually opened one of the city's first gyms on Cuba Street.

== Professional career ==
=== Early career as a world journeyman ===
Rickard was wrestling on the amateur circuit with Ricky Walsh during this time and it was he who convinced Rickard to begin wrestling professionally. He began wrestling for local promoters in Wellington including shows for wrestler Al Hobman. In 1963, Rickard won his first major title when he defeated Hobman for the NWA New Zealand Heavyweight Championship. He briefly lost it to Peter Maivia in Auckland on 3 August 1964, but regained it in Wellington three days later. Rickard re-lost the title to Hobman later that year. On the advice of Ricky Wallace, he later began travelling overseas. His first international tour was to Australia and then shortly afterwards went on to New Caledonia, Tonga, Samoa, Fiji, and Hawaii. He also wrestled throughout Canada and the United States early in his career.

During the next two decades, Rickard's professional wrestling career would take him to countries throughout the world and many were where in places where professional wrestling had never been promoted before; he would make numerous trips to Australia and Singapore, and wrestle in Japan, Taiwan, Hong Kong, Thailand, Malaysia, Indonesia, India and most of the major Pacific Islands including New Hebrides, Western Samoa, American Samoa, Tahiti and Hawaii. He eventually became one of the top wrestlers to compete internationally during the 1960s and 70s and often faced many prominent stars of the era. He was the opponent of many NWA World Heavyweight Champions in bouts outside North America, such as Jack Brisco and Dory Funk Jr., and was also involved in high-profile matches with The Destroyer, André the Giant, Abe Jacobs and King Kong, the latter billed as "the uncrowned Heavyweight Champion of the World". His bouts in Australia against Killer Kowalski were called "real blood baths". He also wrestled Karl Gotch while touring Canada in 1965 and publicly praised his scientific abilities afterwards as "a true wrestler with all the science that we are led to believe the greats of earlier generations possessed – men like Jim Londos, Dick Shikat, Stan Zbyszko and others".

=== Singapore and the Jakarta airport riot ===
In July 1969, he accompanied the Japanese Wrestling Association on its tour of Southeast Asia. He teamed with Kurt von Stroheim, a tag team champion in the United States and Australia with his brother Karl, and lost to Giant Baba & Antonio Inoki in both their encounters in Singapore and Hong Kong. On the second day of the tour, on 15 July, he and von Stroheim wrestled Giant Baba & Michiaki Yoshimura at Victoria City's South China Stadium in front of 5,000 fans. Four months later in Tokyo, approximately 8,500 were in attendance when Rickard fought to a double-countout with Kantaro Hoshino at the Sumo Hall.

That same year, while wrestling out of Singapore, Rickard was visiting the Indonesian capital of Jakarta with several other wrestlers. While arriving at an airport, he and two other wrestlers, King Kong and Mr. X, started a brawl with Shintaro Fuji, Jack Claybourne, and Charlie Londos. The local populace was unfamiliar with professional wrestling at the time and when Jack Claybourne, a French-speaking African from Martinique, was seen being attacked by masked wrestler Mr. X it was presumed to be a racially motivated assault. As the country was then under control of the military, truckloads of soldiers were called in and soon arrived the airport. All six wrestlers fled to the runway where Rickard flagged down a small plane getting ready to take off. Boarding the plane, the pilot refused to take off until the soldiers began firing and one of the bullets went through the plane's fuselage. Flying back to Singapore, a friend gave Mr. X a newspaper cutting with a picture of the airport brawl. The headline read "Steve Rickard and Ku Klux Klan gangsters from Australia in racial attack at airport". Rickard and the other wrestlers were allowed to reenter the country to appear for their match after local promoter Ranjid Singh offered a "sweetener" during a meeting with military leaders.

Rickard was involved in other incidents during his international travels. He was riding a train in India when it was bombed in a terrorist attack. He was also once stranded in Greece when the government closed down the country's airports during trouble with Turkey.

=== Touring India as Young Kong ===
Rickard later became a close friend of King Kong and who later asked him to take his place in a tour of India in early 1970. Kong also asked Rickard to use his name, wrestling as his kayfabe "son" Young Kong, which was considered a great honour at the time given Kong's legendary reputation throughout Asia at the time and Rickard's bouts in India drew thousands of people. At one point, at a show in Zijayawada, he was the only non-Indian wrestler booked for the event and many of the local Indian wrestlers were favored by the crowd. Rickard was scheduled to face Tiger Sucha Singh, a top star in the area at the time, and defeated him after 50 minutes. Fans charged the ring almost immediately after the bout, but instead of reacting violently, they "hoisted on their shoulders and carried from the ring". Returning to Singapore after the tour, Rickard visited King Kong in hospital two days before his death on 16 May 1970. The next day at his funeral, he served as King Kong's pallbearer along with five other wrestlers.

That same year, Rickard was profiled by Fight Times Magazine and which claimed that he was "rapidly becoming known as the greatest globetrotter in wrestling". At the time of the article, he was on a tour in Australia and was to travel to Japan and then return to New Zealand via the United States and Hawaii. Rickard had wrestled in the US earlier in his career and had a brief stint in the Carolinas where he teamed with fellow New Zealander Abe Jacobs before returning to Singapore choosing to honour a prior commitment with local promoters there by opening for them in their new season. While wrestling for Frank Tunney and Maple Leaf Wrestling, he faced Giant Jean Ferre in front of 14,000 people at the Maple Leaf Gardens on 14 November 1971.

=== All Star Pro Wrestling ===
When not competing internationally, he also wrestled in his native New Zealand, where he became a mainstay for the country's main promotion, the Dominion Wrestling Union, for longtime promoter Walter Miller. After Miller's death in 1959, Rickard ran the DWU before forming his own promotion, All Star Pro Wrestling, three years later. Although he would only run cards on and off during the next few years, Rickard's organisation would eventually succeed the DWU as the country's single major wrestling promotion for the next 30 years.

Walter's death caused a decline in wrestling, not only in New Zealand, but for the entire Australasian region as appearances from foreign wrestlers declined to only a few each year. Rickard and John da Silva, who ran the rival Central Wrestling Alliance, sought to develop their own stars during early to mid-1960s such as Al Hobman, Tony Garea, Peter Maivia, and The Sheepherders. He and fellow wrestler Joe Komone also discovered future Australian heavyweight champion Earl Black and who spent his rookie year for Rickard in Wellington before going to work for Australian promoters Hal Morgan and Jim Barnett in Sydney.

Eventually, he and Jim Barnett of World Championship Wrestling in Australia were able to work together to bring back foreign wrestlers to the Pacific within a few years. By the late 1960s, New Zealand was being regularly visited by Australian wrestlers Ron Miller and Larry O'Day of Barnett's World Championship Wrestling, Robert Bruce from Scotland, Canadians Gordon Nelson and George Gordienko, and French wrestler André the Giant. In 1972, he helped book one of the biggest tours to date when US wrestlers Big Bad John, Bulldog Brower, Les Wolff, King Curtis Iaukea, Spiros Arion, Mark Lewin, Thunderbolt Patterson, Sweet Daddy Siki, Tarzan Tyler, Dewey Robertson and Haystacks Calhoun wrestled throughout the country. The American wrestlers proved very popular with the public and a few, such as Calhoun and his wife, were featured in the national media.

In 1972, Rickard's partnership with Jim Barnett ended when Barnett sold his share of Big Time Wrestling and went back to the United States. By this time, Rickard had decided to promote All Star Pro-Wrestling full-time in New Zealand as live events were proving extremely popular. His shows sold out the Wellington Winter Show Buildings ten weeks in a row and often had to turn away hundreds of spectators. On one occasion, Rickard had to rescue his wife from angry fans who, when told the show had sold out, began rocking the small ticket booth.

Many wrestlers from throughout the world, especially from Canada and the United States, would come to wrestle for Rickard's All Star Pro-Wrestling for the next decade. Not only were these some of the top wrestlers of the NWA at the time but younger wrestlers as well. Rick Martel made one of his first international tours for Rickard in 1974 and later became a major star for his promotion.

=== On the Mat ===
Rickard's success with All Star Pro-Wrestling encouraged him to capitalize on this popularity with a nationally broadcast wrestling program. He had seen how successful televised wrestling had been in Australia and in the United States, and with Jim Barnett was involved with airing the short-lived Big Time Wrestling in 1972. Similar to Britain's World of Sport, the program was to showcase both the country's top wrestlers and international stars of the period. He used footage taken from one of his earlier events at the Wellington Winter Show Buildings had a film pilot made which he used to "pitch" the idea to TV1 but it passed on the show. Rickard had to wait two years until the founding of a second network, TV2, which was more favourable to the idea of a wrestling program.

After meeting with then programme director Kevan Moore, Rickard developed the show with South Pacific Pictures. The first episode of On the Mat premiered in 1975, with Ernie Leonard and Rickard as the play-by-play announcer, and was an instant success. It remained on the air for 9 years, being broadcast in several countries, and became New Zealand's longest-running sports show. During the show's off-season, he and the All Star Pro-Wrestlers spent the three months wrestling overseas touring the Middle East, India, Singapore, Malaysia, Pakistan, Thailand, Hong Kong and Hawaii.

Rickard often stepped out of his role as announcer and actively competed on the show. On 22 June 1978, he defeated Toru Tanaka for the NWA British Empire/Commonwealth Champions. He and Tanaka traded the belt twice in a two-month period and Rickard went on to hold the title a record 8-times in the next five years.

Rickard also started promoting outside New Zealand, purchasing the 50th State Big Time Wrestling territory in Hawaii from Ed Francis. In June 1979, he began holding weekly matches at Block Arena in Pearl Harbor, Hawaii, and monthly events at the Blaisdell Center Arena in downtown Honolulu. He had a television contract with KGMB-TV, retaining Lord Blears as his announcer, and featured Rick Martel, Siva Afi, "Pretty Boy" Larry Sharpe, Don Muraco, Rocky Johnson, Billy White Wolf, Karl von Steiger, Ripper Collins and other NWA stars. He also used many of his own wrestlers such as The Sheepherders and, based partly on their television appearances, were seen by US promoters and eventually brought to the United States. He sold his territorial rights in Hawaii to Peter Maivia a year later.

He also continued wrestling in New Zealand during this time meeting NWA World Heavyweight Champion Harley Race in Hamilton on 11 September 1979, and defeating the world champion via disqualification, and teaming with Rick Martel to defeat Mr. Fuji & Casey Mille in Auckland a month later.

His two sons, Ricky and Tony Rickard, were trained by Rickard and also involved in the promotion and sometimes featured in its storylines. In 1981, Steve Rickard feuded with Larry O'Day over the NWA British Empire/Commonwealth Championship after O'Day broke the leg of one of his sons. Ricky Rickard, though his career was brief, became an accomplished wrestler in his own right by capturing his father's title from Butcher Brannigan two years later. On one occasion, unrelated to an ongoing storyline, Ricky was wrestling in a tag team match refereed by his brother Tony and commentated by their father.

On 8 October 1981, he and Mark Lewin were awarded the NWA Australasian Tag Team Championship and held the titles for nearly seven months. Though they lost the titles to King Kamaka & Baron Von Krupp in Auckland the following year, they regained the titles on 27 May 1982. Their second and final reign lasted two months and ended when they were beaten by King Kamaka & Ox Baker on 19 August.

Though foreign stars, especially from the US, were becoming harder to find by the early 1980s, Rickard was able to bring in Harley Race, Abdullah the Butcher and "The Original Sheik" Ed Farhat as well as younger wrestlers such as Bret Hart and Barry Darsow. Darsow, who wrestled as Mongol Zar, later defeated him for the NWA British Empire/Commonwealth Championship in 1983 but quickly regained it. That same year, the 54-year-old Rickard won the national championship from Siva Afi and vacated shortly afterwards. It had been twenty years since he had last held the title. Also, on 4 March 1983, he fought "The Nature Boy" Ric Flair for the NWA World Heavyweight Championship in Hamilton, New Zealand.

The poor New Zealand economy, as well as the decline of the NWA in the face of the national expansion of the World Wrestling Federation, made importing foreign wrestlers extremely difficult and finally Rickard could no longer afford to produce the show and was forced to cancel On the Mat by 1984.

=== Later career and retirement ===
As a member of the National Wrestling Alliance, Rickard was involved in arranging title defences in the Australasian region for NWA World champions during the 1970s and 80s. He was responsible for the unsanctioned title switch between Ric Flair and Harley Race at the Wellington Town Hall on 21 March 1984, and in Geylang, Singapore three days later. Race, who had been friends with Rickard for many years, agreed to this in an attempt to help revive wrestling in Australasia then in decline. Flair also went along with it later commenting "If Harley Race OK'd it, it was hard for anyone to tell them different". It has been worked out a "backroom deal", mostly to keep it a secret from wrestling "dirt sheets" such as the Wrestling Observer, however the NWA objected to being left out of the planning and refused to recognize these title changes for several years.

After the cancellation of On the Mat, Rickard continued to promote shows with All Star Pro-Wrestling and attempted several international tours. In the mid-1980s, he spent time in NWA Hawaii where he defended the Commonwealth title against Larry O'Day and Lars Anderson. He also teamed with his son Tony against Larry O'Day & Ripper Collins in a best 2-of-3 falls match for the NWA Australasian Tag Team titles.

Rickard retired from active competition in 1989, shortly before his 60th birthday, as a result of a series of injuries sustained during his career. He underwent surgery to have had both his hips and knees replaced, and an untreated shoulder dislocation sustained during an overseas tour would continue to trouble him for many years.

=== The Main Event and NWA ===
In 1990, Rickard attempted another wrestling program called "The Main Event" which aired on TV3. Like On the Mat, the show featured local New Zealand talent as well as international wrestlers such as the Mongolian Mauler, the Russian Brute, The Russian Brute, Lou Perez, The Bull, The Terminator, and The Nasty Boys (Brian Knobs & Jerry Sags). The main star, however, was Siva Afi who won the NWA British Empire/Commonwealth Championship from Canadian Stockman in Auckland on 13 July 1990. Although Rickard had a less active role in the show outside his duties as announcer he had a small role in its storylines. While serving as the guest ring announcer for a championship tournament in 1991, for example, he was attacked the Mongolian Mauler after losing to Siva Afi in the finals. The program was unable to match the ratings of its rival on TV2 (New Zealand), WWF Superstars of Wrestling, and was cancelled after 11 episodes.

Though All Star Pro-Wrestling ceased promoting shortly after the cancellation of the show, Rickard remained a member of the NWA up until the mid-1990s. In 1994, he reappeared in NWA Hawaii where he wrestled Jerry "The King" Lawler, with Brian Christopher in his corner, at the Honolulu Stadium. He also served as president of the organisation, along with Howard Brody, Dennis Coralluzzo and Jim Crockett, Jr. from 1993 to 1995, and then alone until 1996. He was also involved with the Cauliflower Alley Club, a professional wrestling and boxing fraternal society, and was on the board of directors at one time; he became an official honouree of the organisation in 1997.

He continued promoting wrestling events into the 21st century running occasional events in southeast Asia. On 12 December 2004, he organised a show at the Singapore Indoor Stadium featuring the first steel cage match held in Singapore in over a decade and headlined by Dusty Wolfe, The Honky Tonk Man, Warlord and The Barbarian.

== Later years ==
In the years following his retirement, Rickard has been recognized by the national media for his contributions to professional wrestling in New Zealand. He has been referred to as "the Vince McMahon of New Zealand wrestling" by the New Zealand Herald and credited as "the man who turned wrestling into home entertainment" with his On the Mat program. He has also received praise from the internet wrestling community being called "one of New Zealand's greatest wrestlers" by the Pro Wrestling Torch.

In June 2007, Rickard was interviewed by KiwiProWrestling.co.nz where he reflected on his amateur and professional career. On 13 June 2008, Rickard visited Kiwi Pro Wrestling's "Wild 4 Wrestling" training facility where he met with KPW CEO Rip Morgan, "Irishman" Mike Ryan and several of its students, most notably, Max "the Axe" Damage.

In early 2009, he and his wife Lorraine left their home of 30 years in Oriental Bay and moved into a retirement home in Greenmeadows outside his birthplace of Napier. On 3 September 2009, Rickard celebrated his 80th birthday in Hawke's Bay which was attended by around 100 guests including former wrestlers Arthur Sneddon and Joe Fau. The event was covered by the New Zealand Herald. Two months later, he was interviewed for A Kiwi Century On the Mat, an upcoming historical documentary on professional wrestling in New Zealand, a year later. That same year, Dave Cameron of Fight Times Magazine ranked him #4 of a top ten listing of New Zealand's greatest wrestlers. The New Zealand Herald included Rickard in its list of New Zealand's favourite wrestlers as did the Herald columnist Chris Rattue in his own top ten list. He died on 5 April 2015 in Queensland, Australia.

== Championships and accomplishments ==
- All Star Pro Wrestling
  - NWA British Empire/Commonwealth Championship (New Zealand version) (8 times)
  - NWA Australasian Tag Team Championship (2 times, first) – with Mark Lewin
- Cauliflower Alley Club
  - Other inductee (1997)
- National Wrestling Alliance
  - National
    - NWA New Zealand Heavyweight Championship (3 times)
  - Regional
    - NWA Australasian Heavyweight Championship (1 time)

Preceded by Seiji Sakaguchi	President of the National Wrestling Alliance; 1993–1995 (with Howard Brody, Dennis Coralluzzo and Jim Crockett Jr.)	Succeeded by Himself
Preceded by Howard Brody, Dennis Coralluzzo and Jim Crockett Jr.	President of the National Wrestling Alliance; 1995–1996	Succeeded by Howard Brody
