= Robert Bruce (wrestler) =

Scottish-born wrestler (1943–2009)

Personal information
- Born: 3 November 1943 Musselburgh, Scotland, UK
- Died: 2 March 2009 (aged 65) Auckland, New Zealand

Professional wrestling career
- Ring name: Robert Bruce
- Billed height: 6 ft 3 in (191 cm)
- Billed weight: 276 lb (125 kg)
- Debut: 17 March 1967

Robert Bruce (3 November 1943 – 2 March 2009), born John Charles Young, was a Scottish-born professional wrestler and talent agent in Auckland, New Zealand.

== Biography ==
Bruce was born in Musselburgh, near Edinburgh in Scotland. He was born John Charles Young, but adopted the stage name of Robert the Bruce, later shortened to Robert Bruce, and kept the name when he quit wrestling. In the ring he played the quintessential villain who prefaced every low blow with an evil smirk, once saying "Honestly, it's better being a bad guy. I suppose it's the underlying evil you may have. You get a lot more fun."

He began wrestling in London in 1967, and toured the United Kingdom, South Africa, Japan, Australia, New Zealand and Fiji, eventually settling in New Zealand in the 1970s after wrestling John da Silva there for the Commonwealth championship in 1972. He held the Commonwealth Heavyweight Title on and off over a five-year period, and wrestled for the World Title. In 1972, he had a small role as one of the bouncers in the Korova Milk Bar in the film A Clockwork Orange.

Bruce retired from wrestling due to injuries to his back and elbows, and decided to form a talent agency in 1978 when he realised that there was no such company in New Zealand. The Robert Bruce Agency was nicknamed the "Ugly Bruce" agency, as Bruce claimed his first clients were his former wrestling friends seeking roles as ugly people, thugs or stuntmen. His later clients included well-known New Zealand actors such as Cliff Curtis, the late Kevin Smith, Robbie Magasiva, Frankie Stevens, Jackie Clarke and Temuera Morrison. He operated out of a villa in suburban Grey Lynn, and his word was his bond. The villa was distinguished by the word "Tobermory", in memory of the lighthouse on the Isle of Mull where his maternal grandfather was a lighthouse keeper, and where his ashes are to be spread.

In addition to representing several of New Zealand's top actors, Bruce worked as a stuntman and fight co-ordinator on several New Zealand films, television shows and theatrical plays, working on 73 TV series, 39 films and 21 live shows, and as an actor played the role of a former international rugby player in the 1991 film Old Scores. He was an animal lover, and was a vice-patron of the Royal New Zealand Society for the Prevention of Cruelty to Animals.

Bruce died suddenly and unexpectedly after a short illness on 2 March 2009; his age at the time of his death was reported as unknown by some sources, although other sources say he was 65.

== Championships and accomplishments ==
- NWA New Zealand

- NWA New Zealand Heavyweight Championship (2 times)
