= John da Silva =

New Zealand boxer, professional and amateur wrestler (1934–2021)

Personal information
- Born: 11 June 1934 Pukekohe, New Zealand
- Died: 8 April 2021 (aged 86)
- Relatives: Garth da Silva (son); Paul Silva (uncle)

Professional wrestling career
- Ring name(s): John Walter da Silva; John Silva
- Debut: 1958
- Retired: 1979

John Walter da Silva QSM (11 June 1934 – 8 April 2021) was a New Zealand wrestler and boxer.

== Biography ==
Da Silva was born on 11 June 1934. He represented New Zealand in wrestling at the 1956 Olympics and at the 1958 British Empire and Commonwealth Games. In 1955 he held both the New Zealand Heavyweight Wrestling title and the Auckland Heavyweight Boxing title. He was of Portuguese, African, English and French Tahitian descent. Paul Silva, a competitive wood chopper, was his uncle.

An amateur from 1953, he turned professional after the 1958 Commonwealth Games in Cardiff. He wrestled throughout New Zealand and around the world. He retired in 1977. In the 1994 New Year Honours, he was awarded the Queen's Service Medal for community service.

Da Silva set up a geographically isolated boot camp, the Te Whakapakari Youth Programme, at Aotea on Great Barrier Island in 1977. The aim was to de-program young Māori from drug abuse and give them skills and confidence. Conditions were harsh. In 1989 he established Whakapakari Youth Trust, which was approved as a youth justice sentencing option. The Royal Commission of Inquiry into Abuse in Care reported in 2024 that "young people's lives were ruined from the abuse they suffered" at Whakapakari. Survivors reported physical and sexual abuse from supervisors and da Silva.

Until his death on 8 April 2021 at the age of 86, he lived on Great Barrier Island. He was the father of boxer Garth da Silva.

== Championships and accomplishments ==
- All Star Pro Wrestling
  - NWA British Empire/Commonwealth Championship (New Zealand version) (6 times)
