= NZPWI Invitational =

The NZPWI Invitational was a professional wrestling pay-per-view (PPV) event hosted by the website New Zealand Pro Wrestling Informer (NZPWI). The event was the first interpromotional show ever held in New Zealand and featured wrestlers from the country's three major promotions Impact Pro Wrestling, Kiwi Pro Wrestling, New Zealand Wide Pro Wrestling, and Peter Ball's Major Impact Wrestling from Australia now called Impact Pro Wrestling Australia. Held annually in 2006 and 2007, it was primarily a single-elimination tournament and included a 20-man battle royal semi-main event. The battle royal would end via pin or submission between the last two entrants, the winner of which would receive an entry for next year's invitational.

The event was largely organised by Dion McCraken, NZPWI editor-in-chief, whose intention was to bring attention to professional wrestling in New Zealand. Similar to the Super 8 Tournament in the United States or the Super J-Cup in Japan, it showcased the top talent of New Zealand's "big three" and provided the first major television exposure for many independent wrestlers in the Australasian region since the days of Steve Rickard's "On the Mat" during the 1980s. The show also served as a reunion of sorts for older veterans of the era. John da Silva, a champion amateur and pro wrestler during the 1960s and 70s, was in attendance at the 2006 invitational and presented the trophy to "Heartless" Alfred Valentine after winning the tournament.

It was one of the largest show's ever held in New Zealand and the event received some coverage by the national media. The 2006 NZPWI Invitational was promoted by Fight Times Magazine in March 2006. The Machine, an IPW wrestler and first entrant to battle royal, was featured in a cover story for the Horowhenua-Kapiti Weekend Chronicle on 29 July. Two of its participants, IPW wrestlers Alfred Valentine and Jon E. King, were interviewed on TV One's morning talk show Breakfast by Kay Gregory days prior to the event.

The first annual NZPWI Invitational was held at the Lynfield YMCA on 12 August 2006, and was attended by a sell out crowd of 450 fans. It was the largest attendance for a live wrestling event in 20 years. The 2006 NZPWI Invitational was later shown on Sky 1 and proved so popular that the network aired on primetime the following year. The second show was broadcast following the 9 December 2007 edition of WWE Smackdown, and again on Christmas Eve followed by the WWE Hall of Fame Induction Ceremony. The program was watched by over 100,000 people on Sky 1 and both invitationals later released on DVD. Dion McCracken served as the colour commentator for both shows, with co-host Vinny Dunn in 2006 and manager Gary O. Davis in 2007, and his performance led to a full-time position as the head announcer of IPW Ignition.

Although plans were made to hold a third NZPWI Invitational in November 2008, the event was unable to gain the necessary corporate sponsorship to cover costs. Previous shows had been held at a significant loss, costing at least $15,000 to run, and almost entirely supported financially by McCraken himself. Due to the financial burden, as well as familial commitments, McCraken officially announced on NZPWI.co.nz that he would no longer be able to host the event.

== Show results ==
=== 2006 NZPWI Invitational ===
12 August 2006 in Lynfield, New Zealand (Lynfield YMCA)

#	Results	Stipulations	Times
Dark	Lil T (with Paul Starr) defeated "Lyte Playa" Roger Ventura	Singles match	Unknown
1	Sweet Ass (with Gary O. Davis) defeated "Double D" Davey Deluxeo (with Jordan Invincible)	NZPWI Invitational Quarter-Final match	10:26
2	KPW Heavyweight Champion H-Flame defeated Joey Kinkade	NZPWI Invitational Quarter-Final match	08:23
3	Alfred Valentine defeated Jonnie Juice	NZPWI Invitational Quarter-Final match	06:30
4	IPW Heavyweight Champion Jon E. King (with Alexander) defeated Cruz	NZPWI Invitational Quarter-Final match	8:33
5	Sweet Ass (with Gary O. Davis) defeated KPW Heavyweight Champion H-Flame	NZPWI Invitational Semi-Final match	12:04
6	Alfred Valentine defeated IPW Heavyweight Champion Jon E. King (with Alexander)	NZPWI Invitational Semi-Final match	11:46
7	Jean Miracle won a 20-man battle royal by defeating Dal Knox	First Invite Eliminator Battle Royal	47:56
8	Alfred Valentine defeated Sweet Ass (with Gary O. Davis)	NZPWI Invitational Final match	8:17

=== Tournament brackets ===
The tournament took place on 12 August 2006. The tournament brackets were:

Quarterfinals
Sweet Ass	Pin
Davey Deluxeo	10:26
Joey Kinkade	Pin
H-Flame	8:23
Alfred Valentine	Pin
Jonnie Juice	6:30
Cruz	Pin
Jon E. King	8:33

Semifinals
Sweet Ass	CO
H-Flame	12:04
Alfred Valentine	Sub
Jon E. King	11:46

Finals
Sweet Ass	Pin
Alfred Valentine	8:17

=== 2007 NZPWI Invitational ===
10 November 2007 in Whangarei, New Zealand (Forum North Exhibition Hall)

#	Results	Stipulations	Times
1	Dal Knox defeated "Lyte Playa" Roger Ventura	NZPWI Quarter-Final match	
2	IPW Heavyweight Champion Jon E. King defeated KPW Heavyweight Champion H-Flame	NZPWI Quarter-Final match	
3	NZWPW Heavyweight Champion D-Hoya defeated Alfred Valentine (with Flag Boy)	NZPWI Quarter-Final match	
4	Cruz defeated IPWA Heavyweight Champion Dallas Mead (with Super Coach)	NZPWI Quarter-Final match	
5	IPW Heavyweight Champion Jon E. King defeated Dal Knox	NZPWI Semi-Final match	
6	Cruz defeated NZWPW Champion D-Hoya	NZPWI Semi-Final match	
7	H-Flame won a 20-man battle royal by eliminating Jordan Invincible	First Invite Eliminator Battle Royal	
8	IPW Heavyweight Champion Jon E. King defeated Cruz	NZPWI Final match	

=== Tournament brackets ===
The tournament took place on 10 November 2007. The tournament brackets were:

Quarterfinals
Roger Ventura	Pin
Dal Knox
Jon E. King	Pin
H-Flame
D-Hoya	Pin
Alfred Valentine
Cruz	Pin
Dallas Mead

Semifinals
Dal Knox	Pin
Jon E. King
D-Hoya	DQ
Cruz

Finals
Jon E. King	Pin
Cruz
