= IPW New Zealand Heavyweight Championship =

Professional wrestling championship

IPW Heavyweight Championship

Details
- Promotion: Impact Pro Wrestling
- Date established: 9 April 2002
- Current champion: Horus
- Date won: 11 July 2026
Statistics
- First champion: The Machine
- Most reigns: James Shaw (5 reigns)
- Longest reign: Jake Shehaan (693 days)
- Shortest reign: Charlie Roberts (2 minutes and 38 seconds)
- Oldest champion: JayRilla (40 years, 181 days)
- Youngest champion: Lyte Playa (17 years, 105 days)
- Heaviest champion: JayRilla; 200 kg (440 lb)
- Lightest champion: Lyte Playa; 74 kg (163 lb)

Former IPW Heavyweight Champion, Mr Burns

The IPW New Zealand Heavyweight Championship is the top professional wrestling championship title in the New Zealand promotion Impact Pro Wrestling. It was the original heavyweight title of the Mania Pro Wrestling promotion, later used in IPW as its primary singles title. It was introduced as the MPW Heavyweight Championship on 9 April 2002. When Impact Pro Wrestling was founded by a core group of MPW wrestlers in 2003, the title was established as its new primary singles title and renamed to the IPW New Zealand Heavyweight Championship. The MPW Championship reigns are still recognised in the title's lineage. The current champion is Horus who is in his third reign.

The championship is regularly defended throughout New Zealand, most often in central Auckland, at monthly live shows. It has formerly been defended at live events such as the Armageddon Expo and on weekly series IPW Ignited. In 2007, the title made its debut in the Northland Region, with the promotion's IPW Collision event in Whangārei. The title match featured Jon E. King facing off against the Samoan Silverback Alexander. It has also been defended at several interpromotional events both in New Zealand and Australia. IPW Heavyweight Champion Jon E. King competed at the 2006 NZPWI Invitational with KPW Heavyweight Champion H-Flame where both men made it to the semi-finals and where King was eliminated by "Heartless" Alfred Valentine. The 2007 NZPWI Invitational saw the first ever "champion vs. champion" match when returning champions Jon E. King and H-Flame faced each other in a non-title match in the opening rounds. King went on to win the tournament.

The championship is contested in professional wrestling matches. The inaugural champion was The Machine, who defeated Jon E. King in Māngere, Auckland on 9 April 2002 to become the first MPW Heavyweight Champion; King had won a Royal Rumble-type match, eliminating "Superstar" Troy Daniels to earn a place in the championship decider. IPW recognised both MPW Heavyweight Championship reigns when the promotion became Impact Pro Wrestling in 2003. James Shaw holds the record for most reigns with five. At 693 days, Jake Shehaan's second reign was the longest in the title's history. Charlie Roberts' sole reign lasted only two minutes and thirty-eight seconds, the shortest in the history of the title. Overall, there have been 52 reigns shared between 25 wrestlers, with three vacancies.

The promotion has often been represented by the reigning IPW Champion in the national media. In May 2005, TVNZ's Hadyn Jones conducted an interview with The Machine and then IPW Champion The Economist at their Auckland gym. On 2 February 2006, Jon E. King was a guest on Ngati Hine FM where he was interviewed by disc jockey Darcy Edwards and with fellow IPW wrestler Alfred Valentine on the TV One's morning talk show Breakfast by Kay Gregory that summer. Jordan Invincible was among the wrestlers featured on 10 October 2008 edition Television New Zealand's IAM TV and where Invincible wrestled the host in a mock battle at their IPW facility in Auckland. IPW New Zealand Champion Dal Knox was interviewed at the 2008 Armageddon Expo, along with IPW colour commentator Dion McCracken, as part of an upcoming documentary on professional wrestling in New Zealand, A Kiwi Century On The Mat, in April 2009. Knox was also profiled by 20/20 in a special report on professional wrestling in New Zealand, as well as on the Māori Television sports show Hyundai Code.

== Title history ==
=== Reigns ===
Key
No.	Overall reign number
Reign	Reign number for the specific champion
Days	Number of days held
+	Current reign is changing daily

No.	Champion	Championship change			Reign statistics		Notes	Ref.
No.	Champion	Date	Event	Location	Reign	Days	Notes	Ref.
1	The Machine	9 April 2002	Slaughter in the South	Māngere	1	242	The Machine defeated Jon E. King to become the inaugural champion. King had previously won a Royal Rumble-style match to face The Machine.	
2	Davey Deluxeo	7 December 2002	Nightmare Before Xmas	Point Chevalier	1	515	The championship was renamed the 'IPW New Zealand Heavyweight Championship' when IPW was formed in 2003.	
3	Lyte Playa	5 May 2004	Genesis	Point Chevalier	1	105		
4	Davey Deluxeo	18 August 2004	Rival Turf	Point Chevalier	2	122		
5	The Machine	18 December 2004	Nightmare Before Xmas 2	Māngere	2	123		
—	Vacated	20 April 2005	—	—	—	—	The championship was vacated due to The Machine suffering a hand injury.	
6	The Economist	23 April 2005	Collision	Māngere	1	189	The Economist won the vacant championship in tournament final by defeating Joey Kinkade, Jon E. King and The Machine in a fatal four-way elimination match.	
7	Alfred Valentine	29 October 2005	Unleashed	Lynfield	1	147		
8	Jon E. King	25 March 2006	Full Breaking Point	Lynfield	1	21		
9	Alfred Valentine	15 April 2006	Collision	Lynfield	2	63		
10	Jon E. King	17 June 2006	Breakdown	Lynfield	2	71	This was a ladder match.	
11	Davey Deluxeo	27 August 2006	Unbreakable	Lynfield	3	91		
12	Jon E. King	26 November 2006	Extreme Measures	Lynfield	3	384	This was fatal four-way elimination match also involving Jordan Invincible and Alexander.	
13	Dal Knox	15 December 2007	Nightmare Before Xmas 5	Westlake	1	196	This was a Fans Bring the Weapons match.	
14	Jordan Invincible	28 June 2008	Redemption	Lynfield	1	98	This was a no disqualification match.	
15	Dal Knox	4 October 2008	Rival Turf	Lynfield	2	336		
16	Joseph Kinkade	5 September 2009	Fallout	Lynfield	1	98		
17	Vinny Dunn	12 December 2009	Nightmare Before Xmas 7	Westlake	1	168	This was a Fans Bring the Weapons match.	
18	Reuben de Jong	29 May 2010	Genesis	Westlake	1	85	This was an open challenge match issued by Vinny Dunn to any professional wrestler in New Zealand.	
19	Vinny Dunn	22 August 2010	Rival Turf	Westlake	2	<1		
20	Dal Knox	22 August 2010	Rival Turf	Westlake	3	111		
21	Vinny Dunn	11 December 2010	Nightmare B4 Xmas	Westlake	3	91		
22	Dal Knox	12 March 2011	Genesis	Westlake	4	313		
23	Alexander	19 January 2012	Mana Mamau	Westlake	1	15		
24	Kingi	3 February 2012	Mana Mamau	Westlake	4	449	Kingi was formerly known as Jon E. King.	
25	Travis Banks	27 April 2013	A Decade of Impact	Lynfield	1	72	This was a triple threat match also featuring Liam Fury.	
—	Vacated	8 July 2013	—	—	—	—	All IPW championships were vacated in the lead up to Revival of the Fittest.	
26	Vinny Dunn	27 July 2013	Revival of the Fittest	Mt. Albert	4	189	This was a fatal four-way elimination match also featuring Kingi, Joseph Kinkade, and James Shaw, who Dunn last eliminated to win.	
27	Travis Banks	1 February 2014	The Good, The Bad & The Ugly	Lynfield	2	175		
28	Liam Fury	26 July 2014	Trial by Combat	Mt. Albert	1	266		
29	James Shaw	18 April 2015	The Rush for Gold	Mt. Albert	1	84	This was a triple threat match also featuring Jakob Cross.	
30	Jakob Cross	11 July 2015	The Ultimate Prize	Mt. Albert	1	99		
—	Vacated	18 October 2015	—	—	—	—	The championship was vacated due to Jakob Cross attacking a fan.	
31	James Shaw	19 December 2015	Nightmare B4 X-Mas 2015	Lynfield	2	112	A Nightmare Championship Series was used to determine the winner of the vacant championship. The series involved Brook Duncan, Curt Chaos, Dal Knox, Johnny Idol, Liger, No Face, and Shane Sinclair. Shaw defeated Idol in a Fans Bring the Weapons match to win the vacant championship.	
32	Curt Chaos	9 April 2016	Championship Carnage	Mt. Albert	1	378	Chaos cashed in his Eliminator Contract immediately after James Shaw had successfully defended the championship against The Dapper Agents.	
33	Brook Duncan	22 April 2017	The Eliminator	Lynfield	1	<1		
34	James Shaw	22 April 2017	The Eliminator	Lynfield	3	78	Brook Duncan defeated Curt Chaos but was then challenged and beaten by Shaw. Duncan's reign lasted exactly four minutes and sixteen seconds.	
35	Reuben de Jong	9 July 2017	Bangers and Smash	Mt. Eden	2	<1		
36	James Shaw	9 July 2017	Bangers and Smash	Mt. Eden	4	41		
37	Brook Duncan	19 August 2017	Ultimatum	Mt. Eden	2	119	This was The Ultimate match; A 30 minute Iron man match in which the first 20 minutes of the match contested under traditional rules, before the final ten minutes switches to no disqualification.	
38	Mr. Burns	16 December 2017	Nightmare Before Xmas	Mt. Eden	1	154	Mr. Burns defeated Brook Duncan following interference from the Young Nats.	
39	Liam Fury	19 May 2018	IPW XV	Lynfield	2	91		
40	Liger	18 August 2018	Homecoming	Balmoral	1	28	Liger cashed in his Eliminator Contract and defeated Liam Fury after interfering with Liam Fury's match against Henare.	
41	Liam Fury	15 September 2018	Pride vs. Fury	Māngere	3	91		
42	Jakob Cross	15 December 2018	Nightmare Before Xmas	Mt. Eden	2	182	This was a Fans Bring the Weapons match.	
43	Jamie Tagataese	15 June 2019	IPW Winter Warfare	Mt. Eden	1	413		
44	Jake Shehaan	1 August 2020	Fans Bring The Weapons: Tagataese VS Shehaan 2	Mt. Eden	1	140	This was a Fans Bring the Weapons match.	
45	Jamie Tagataese	19 December 2020	Nightmare Before Xmas	Te Atatū Peninsula	2	182	This was a Triple Threat Steel Cage match also featuring Cam Kaiba.	
46	Charlie Roberts	19 June 2021	The Eliminator	Mt. Eden	1	<1		
47	Jake Shehaan	19 June 2021	The Eliminator	Mt. Eden	2	693	Shehaan cashed in his Eliminator Contract which he had won earlier in the night. Roberts' reign lasted exactly two minutes and thirty-eight seconds, beating the previous record for shortest title reign.	
48	Horus	13 May 2023	IPW XX	Mt. Eden	1	217		
49	Spartan	16 December 2023	Nightmare Before Xmas	Mt. Albert	1	171	Spartan cashed in his Eliminator Contract at Misery Business for a match at Nightmare Before Xmas. This was a 'Winner Take All' match with the Kinkade Cup also on the line.	
50	Horus	8 June 2024	Ultimate Glory	Mt. Eden	2	189	This was a four-way Ultimate Match also featuring James Shaw and Jake Shehaan. After 30 minutes had elapsed and nobody had scored a fall, the match went into sudden death overtime. Horus won by pinning Spartan.	
51	James Shaw	14 December 2024	Nightmare Before Christmas	Mt. Eden	5	147	This was a Triple Threat Steel Cage match also featuring Spartan. James Shaw won by cutting a hole in the bottom of the cage with bolt cutters to escape.	
52	JayRilla	10 May 2025	The Eliminator	Mt. Eden	1	427	During the match, Alex Savage cashed in his Eliminator Contract making it a Triple Threat. JayRilla won by pinning Savage.	
52	Horus	11 July 2026	Fans Bring the Weapons	Mt. Albert	3	57+	This was a Triple Threat Fans Bring the Weapons match also featuring Jake Shehaan. This was Horus' Eliminator Contract cash in match. Horus won by choking out Jayrilla with a chain.	

=== Combined reigns ===
As of September 6, 2026.

†	Indicates the current champion
<1	Reign was less than a day

Rank	Wrestler	No. of reigns	Combined days
1	Dal Knox	4	956
2	Jon E. King/Kingi	4	925
3	Jake Shehaan	2	833
4	Davey Deluxeo	3	728
5	Jamie Tagataese	2	595
6	Horus	3	463+
7	James Shaw	5	462
8	Liam Fury	3	448
8	Vinny Dunn	4	448
10	JayRilla	1	427
11	Curt Chaos	1	378
12	The Machine	2	365
13	Jakob Cross	2	281
14	Travis Banks	2	247
15	Alfred Valentine	2	210
16	The Economist	1	189
17	Spartan	1	171
18	Mr. Burns	1	154
19	Brook Duncan	2	119
20	Lyte Playa	1	105
21	Jordan Invincible	1	98
21	Joseph Kinkade	1	98
23	Reuben de Jong	2	85
24	Liger	1	28
25	Alexander	1	15
26	Charlie Roberts	1	<1
