= Jonnie Juice =

New Zealand professional wrestler

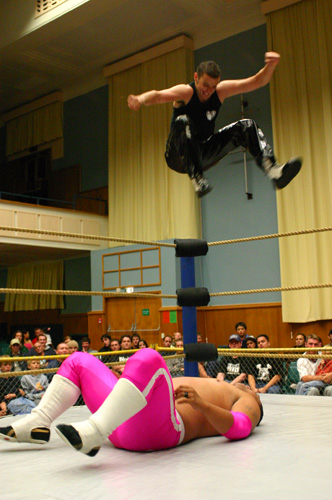
- Jonnie Juice hitting a diving leg drop on Island Boy Si

Personal information
- Born: Christchurch, New Zealand

Professional wrestling career
- Ring name(s): Jonnie Juice; Juice
- Billed height: 6 ft 1 in (1.85 m)
- Billed weight: 180 lb (82 kg)
- Billed from: Awesometown
- Trained by: Martin Stirling; Sa Johnston
- Debut: 20 September 2003
- Retired: 16 July 2010

Jonnie Juice is a New Zealand retired professional wrestler. He is currently contracted to the Wellington based promotion Kiwi Pro Wrestling.

== Career ==
=== New Zealand Wide Pro Wrestling ===
Juice was among of the first trainees of Martin Stirling prior to the creation of Wellington Pro Wrestling (now known as New Zealand Wide Pro Wrestling) and is credited with being one of the "originals" of the current Wellington wrestling scene, and a founding father of NZWPW.

He had many matches with and against fellow beginning trainees, including "The Fiery One" Inferno, Creed, The Ram, D Hoya and X-Rated. He was part of a clique of babyfaces known as "The Youngbloods", consisting of himself, Inferno and D Hoya.

In January 2005, Juice went from being a popular face and turned heel, turning on his best friend Inferno.

On 4 November 2005, at NZWPW's final show of the year, Eruption II, Juice captured the NZWPW New Zealand Heavyweight Championship after defeating then champion Island Boy Si and H-Flame is a triple threat match. Juice lost the title five months later to D Hoya at Powerplay 3 before leaving the company in May 2006.

=== Kiwi Pro Wrestling ===
In June 2005, several wrestlers from NZWPW left to form another wrestling promotion in Wellington, Kiwi Pro Wrestling. With the company switch came a character transformation and name change.

Jonnie Juice adopted a suave persona, he became known for wearing a black shirt with a white tie, and was accompanied to the ring by Jessie and Hollie, clad in the same garb – collectively known as Team Pretty.

In KPW's first show Storm Warning he was involved in the Heavyweight tournament to name the first contender to the KPW Heavyweight Title. He won against Buck in the first round via count out, and went on to lose to H-Flame in round two. At KPW's second show, Ring Rampage, he won a Battle Royal to become the second contender for the KPW Heavyweight title. Jonnie Juice and H-Flame fought for the right to be the first champion at KPW's third show, Eruption. Jonnie was bested by H-Flame, and the two went on to have many matches over the following year.

Since, he has been involved in many different capacities – he suffered an injury that kept him out of in-ring action for 10 months, but came back full strength and is again an active member of the roster. More recently, the third member of Team Pretty lost a Loser Leaves Town Diva Strap Match due to interference from Jonnie Juice, thus leaving Team Pretty as the duo of Hollie and himself.

On 16 July 2010, Jonnie Juice lost to long-time rival Inferno in a Career vs. Career match, forcing him to retire from active competition in Kiwi Pro Wrestling.

== Championships and accomplishments ==
- New Zealand Wide Pro Wrestling
  - NZWPW New Zealand Heavyweight Championship (1 time)
