= Michel Mulipola =

New Zealand comic book artist and wrestler

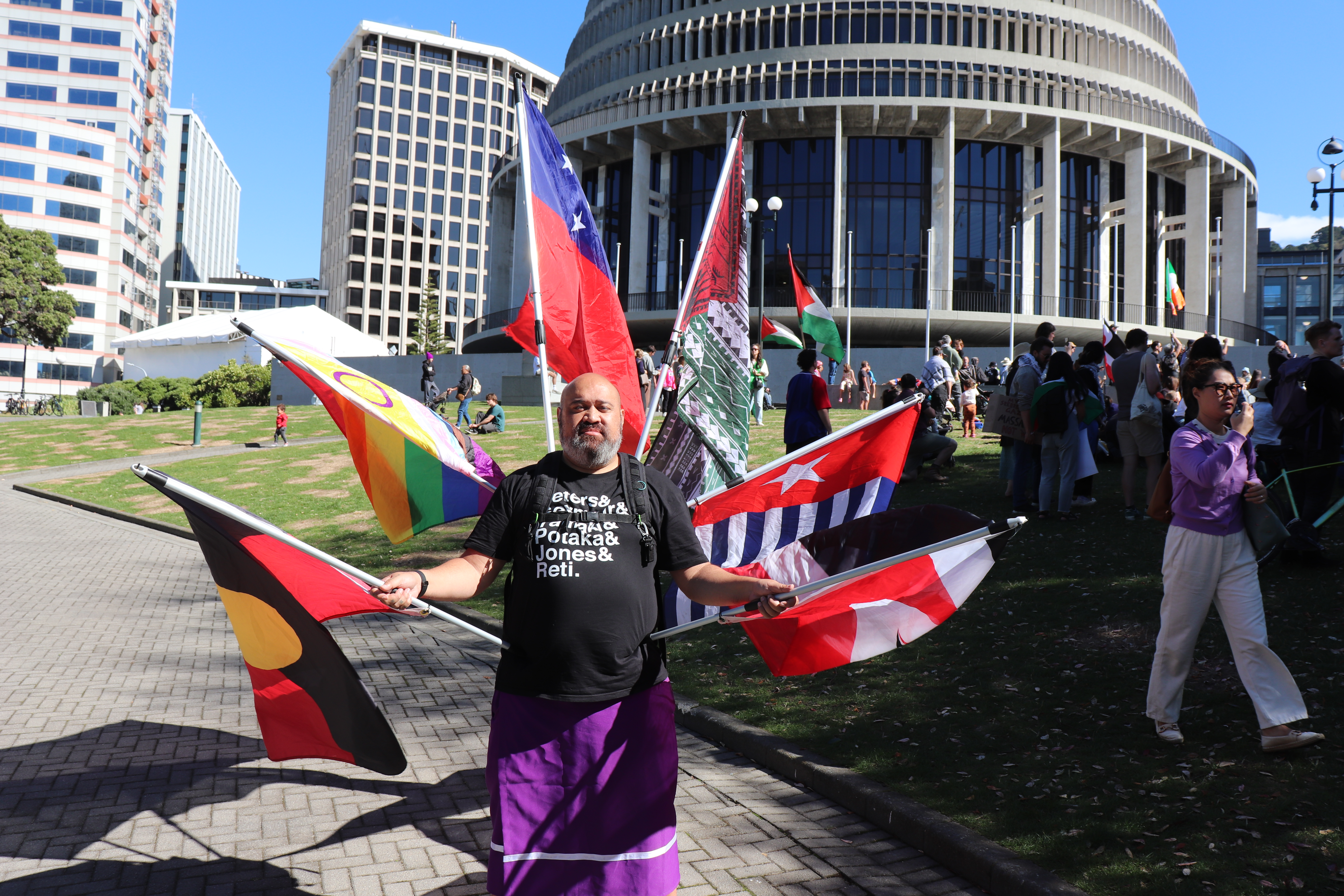
- Michel Mulipola at 2024 march for Palestine
- Born: 1981 (age 44–45); Auckland, New Zealand
- Occupations: Comic artist Professional wrestler
- Website: www.bloodysamoan.com

Michel Mulipola (born 1981) is a New Zealand comic book artist and trained professional wrestler of Samoan descent who lives in South Auckland, New Zealand. He is more commonly known by his artist pseudonym Bloody Samoan or as his supervillain pro-wrestling character Liger. For his comic artist work Mulipola was awarded the Gibson Award for Best New Zealand Comic Book Artist (2006), Winner of V Energy Drinks Pimp My Life competition (2010) and awarded Storylines Notable Book Award for the book Samoan Heroes with author David Riley (2016). He has also provided illustrations consistently over the years for Lift Education, Upper Deck, BOOM! Studios and Reading Warriors.

Mulipola is an active member of the Impact Pro Wrestling community, participating in the 2016 Heavy-Weight New Zealand championship with WWE legend Tonga Fifita / King Haku to become New Zealand's Tag Team champions (2016). Over the years he has and continues to serve his wider community through comic and illustration workshops for interested youth in across the country as well as school visits with Duffy Books In Homes. Mulipola is currently working on his popular US pro wrestling graphic novel series Headlocked with long-time collaborator and author Micheal Kingston. In 2023, Mulipola was contracted by Walt Disney Animation Studios as a Story Artist and Cultural Consultant for Moana 2.

== Early life ==
Mulipola is a New Zealand born Samoan raised in Māngere, South Auckland. His Samoan heritage traces back to the villages of Lefaga and Vaimoso, with the Mulipola name hailing from Manono. He has strong familial ties to the Mau Movement with his Great-Grandfather Mata'utia Karauna Solomona having been the secretary for the Mau Movement as well as a musician. Born into a strong musical family, he gravitated more toward visual art from an age as young as four years old. At five years old, he discovered his uncle's collection of classic superhero comic books, which is the touchstone for Mulipola's art today. A few years later, he would develop the same affinity for Professional Wrestling through watching the WWE and WCW as a child. His love of superhero comic book characters and storytelling within comics found its physical reality in Professional Wrestling. He connected the similarities between comic book storytelling and professional wrestling – the bold colours, larger than life characters, explosive moments – very quickly with passion.

Throughout his teen years Mulipola attended Onehunga High School. He realised as his love for the comic book artform grew as well as his artistic skill that there was no place in New Zealand at the time that taught the skills required to become a professional comic book artist. He taught himself and has refined and deepened his craft independently since.

== Professional career ==
Mulipola, being a self-trained artist, has had a rich and unique artistic journey. His love for comics and the art form led him to work at and help establish Arkham City Comics in Onehunga where he met the owner and longtime friend Jeremy Bishop. In 2004 after Bishop saw the need to display and publish these pieces of original comic art people would share with him in the store. Bishop developed Dealer Man Comics to publish, display and sell local art in his comic book store. Bishop created an anthology comic strip series called New Ground to house all of this local art. Mulipola was among the artists who were featured in the 2004 publication of the anthology. This was Mulipola's first published comic work.

Mulipola continued to create comics for this anthology from 2004 to 2008. During that time he won The Gibson Award for Best New Zealand Comic Book Artist 2006. The following year Mulipola would continue to create comics strips and be an invited guest artist for a comic Knuckles the Malevolent Nun: She Might Get Rather Crude#1 written by Cornelius Stone. He also was a storyboard artist for advertisements with prominent New Zealand brands Memphis Meltdown and Waikato Draught Beer during this time.

A hearty fan of Professional Wrestling already, Mulipola illustrated a comic strip in 2008 for Impact Pro Wrestling. Driven by his longtime love of the sport and longtime love of comics he illustrated himself as a Professional Wrestler and named his persona "Kid Liger". Inspired by this he happened to see that the Pro-Wrestling organisation had tryouts coming up. Mulipola entered himself in having no previous experience. He discovered a talent for the sport and defined his character as a villain, dropping the "Kid" from his name.

Mulipola has been wrestling as the Villainous Liger with Impact Pro Wrestling in Auckland for 18 years and continues to this day. In 2016 he participated in the Heavy Weight New Zealand Championship through Impact Pro Wrestling, partnering with King Haku to become New Zealand's Pro-Wrestling Tag-Team Heavy-Weight Champions. Mulipola also designed the Heavy-Weight Championship Winners' belt for this event.

Winner of the V Energy Drink Pimp My Life Competition and the $10,000 reward. An already-established comic artist Mulipola used his prize money to take him and a friend to San Diego Comic-Con. At the convention, Mulipola presented his portfolio to professionals at the DC Comics booth and networked with representatives from WWE, leading to future collaborations.

There he introduced himself to Micheal Kingston, the author of Headlocked who was impressed with Mulipola's artistic skill as well as his deep respect and first-hand experience in Pro-Wrestling. They began collaborating on Headlocked in 2010 and continue to release issues of the comic book to this day. They have garnered praise from WWE and TNR; Legends including Donovan Dijak, Trent Seven, Ken Anderson, The Addiction, Gangrel, MVP, Cody Rhodes, Hurricane, Rob Van Dam, Booker T, The Young Bucks, Kenny Omega, Samoa Joe, AJ Styles, Mick Foley, Ric Flair and many others have contributed art or stories to the Headlocked comic book series.

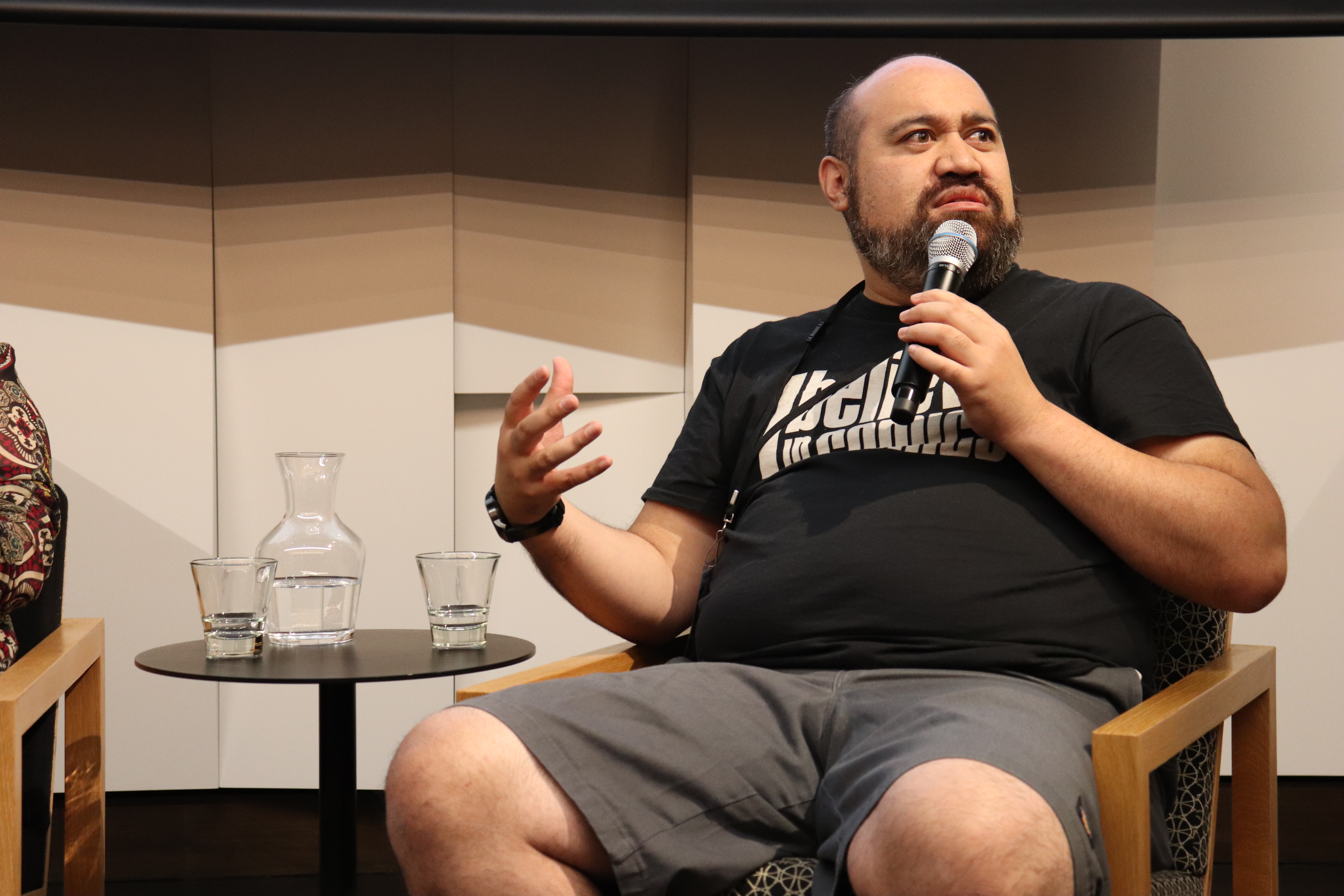
Michel Mulipola at ComicFest in 2019

In 2017 Mulipola was commissioned by WWE through BOOM! Studios to illustrate their 13th issue of a comic book series focusing on different WWE legends. The 13th issue being centred around Samoa Joe. A Samoan comic book artist and pro-wrestler illustrating the iconic Samoan Pro-Wrestler.

Mulipola also lent his talents to Pasifika clothing brands. In collaborations with Overstayer Clothing, Juggernaut Clothing (2008) and Nesian Clothing (2012.)

Through his art, Mulipola has been a consistent illustrator for the WWE (2017–2019) and Marvel studios (2017–2021) illustrating trading cards, comics, and special edition stories. Mulipola has created promotional art and campaigns for companies such as Colenso BBD (2007), SKY TV (2015), SmokeFree RockQuest (2019), BMC Productions (2020), 2K Games ANZ (2020) and Clemenger BBDO (2021).

Mulipola contributes to New Zealand's education system by illustrating books aimed at educating the country's Pasifika community. His books celebrate and educate the youth about the Pacific, these are accessible in schools across the country. These are published through Reading Warrior (2015–2018) and Lift Education (2015–2021). Titles of these books include Samoan Heroes, Tongan Heroes, Cook Island Heroes, Once a Panther, Fanene Peter Maivia: Son of Samoa and many more. In 2020 he collaborated with Nafanuatele Lafitaga Mafaufau and her course Nafanua Communications and Culture Classes to create and publish the first ever comic series entirely in Gagana Samoa, "O le Aiga".

Mulipola is a role model for the Duffy Books in Homes Charitable Foundation. He has been involved with them since 2015 to the present day. He visits schools to share his expertise and experience with students.

In 2020 Mulipola was a recipient of Tautai Pacific Arts Trust FALE-ship home residency.

In 2023, Mulipola was contracted by Walt Disney Animation Studios as a storyboard artist and cultural consultant on Moana 2.

=== Political activism ===
During the 2026 New Zealand general election, Mulipola was selected as a candidate for the Green Party of Aotearoa New Zealand, ranking 49th on the party list. He contested the Māngere electorate for the Greens. In April 2026, he attracted controversy after a social media post emerged of him joking about the assassination of controversial American conservative activist Charlie Kirk in September 2025.

On 7 November, Mulipola came third place in Māngere, gaining 2,313 votes based on preliminary results. Due to his low ranking on the Green Party list, he was not elected into the New Zealand Parliament.

== Awards and residencies ==
- 2006 – Gibson Award for Best New Zealand Comic Book Artist
- 2010 – Winner of V Energy Drink's Pimp My Life Competition
- 2011 – Top 25 finalists for the Stan Lee Foundation 'Create a Superhero' competition
- 2013 – Grand Finalist for Secret Walls X Aotearoa Live Art battles
- 2016 – Storylines Notable Book Award for Samoan Heroes with author David Riley
- 2016 – Heavy-Weight Tag-Team Champion of New Zealand with teammate King Haku
- 2018 – Winner of the Zowie BenQ Tekken 7 Ladder tournament at EVO2018
- 2020 – Recipient of the Tautai FALE-ship home residency

== Professional works ==
Illustration and comic art
Company	Year	Project
Dealer Man Comics	2004	Smacktown! Comic strip for New Ground Anthology
Dealer Man Comics	2004	Sesame Street Fighter comic strip for New Ground Anthology
Dealer Man Comics	2005	Sesame Street Fighter comic strip for New Ground Anthology
Dealer Man Comics	2007	Lucha-a-Koko comic strip for New Ground anthology
Invited as a Guest Artist	2007	Knuckles the Malevolent Nun: She Might Get Rather Crude #1
Impact Pro Wrestling	2008	Emerald Justice Online comic strip
Dealer Man Comics	2008	Lucha-a-Koko comic strip for New Ground anthology
Dbvisit software company	2011	DbMan online comic strips
Invited as a Guest Artist	2011	The Gutters No.197, online comic strip
	2016	Graphic Journey No.7 webcomic
SGR Universe	2016	Supershow trading card game art
BOOM! Studios	2017	WWE No.13 Samoa Joe Story
Upper Deck	2017	Marvel Premier sketch trading cards
BOOM! Studios	2018	WWE WrestleMania 2018 Special No.1 Miz Story
BOOM! Studios	2018	WWE Attitude Era 2018 Special No.1 Stone Cold Story
Upper Deck	2018	Avengers: Infinity War sketch trading cards
BOOM! Studios	2019	WWE Forever Special No.1 Bret Hart Story
BOOM! Studios	2019	WWE John Cena minicomic, Walmart Giveaway
BOOM! Studios	2019	WWE Then. Now. Forever vol.3 Stone Cold & Bret Hart story
BOOM! Studios	2019	WWE The Sami & Kevin Show Samoa Joe story
Upper Deck	2019	Marvel 80th Anniversary sketch trading cards
Upper Deck	2019	Marvel Premier sketch trading cards
Upper Deck	2019	Spider-man: Far From Home sketch trading cards
Upper Deck	2019	Captain Marvel sketch trading cards
Upper Deck	2019	Avengers: Endgame sketch trading cards
Upper Deck	2020	Marvel Masterpieces sketch trading cards
Upper Deck	2021	Marvel Allure sketch trading cards
Upper Deck	2021	Marvel X-Men Metal sketch trading cards
Headlocked	2010–present	US Graphic Novel Series

Advertisements
Company	Year	Project
Colenso BBDO	2007	Memphis Meltdown Advertisement – Storyboard Artist
Colenso BBDO	2007	Waikato Draught Beer Billboards – Storyboard Artist
SKY TV	2015	Sky TV 25th Anniversary ad campaign illustrations – Heroes & Villains
Smokefree Rockquest	2019	Tangata Beats poster art
BMC Productions	2020	SIS Show Comedy Central promotional art
2K Games ANZ	2020	WWE 2K Battlegrounds promotional art
Clemenger BBDO	2021	Unite Against COVID-19 mall ad campaign

Book illustrations
Company	Year	Project
Reading Warrior	2015	Samoan Heroes
Reading Warrior	2015	Rugby: The Players, The Skills and The Style
Lift Education	2015	The Rules Journey, School Journal
Lift Education	2016	Breathless, School Journal
Reading Warrior	2016	Tongan Heroes
Reading Warrior	2017	Cook Island Heroes
Reading Warrior	2018	Fanene Peter Maivia: Son of Samoa
Penguin Books NZ	2018	Oh Boy! A Storybook of NZ Men
Lift Education	2019	Once a Panther, School Journal Comic
Lift Education	2019	The Choice, School Journal
Nafanua Communication & Culture Classes	2020	Samoan language online comics
Lift Education	2021	Samoan & Tongan language autobiographical comic, School Journal
Duffy Books in Homes	2015 – current	Duffy Books in Home Role Model

Clothing design
Company	Year	Project
Juggernaut Clothing	2008	T-Shirt design for Samoan K2 Champion: Mark Hunt
Impact Pro-Wrestling	2008	Heavy-Weight Championship Winners Belt design
Overstayer Clothing	2008	T-shirt designs
Nesian Street Clothing	2012	T-shirt designs (unused)
