= IPW New Zealand Women's Championship =

Professional wrestling championship

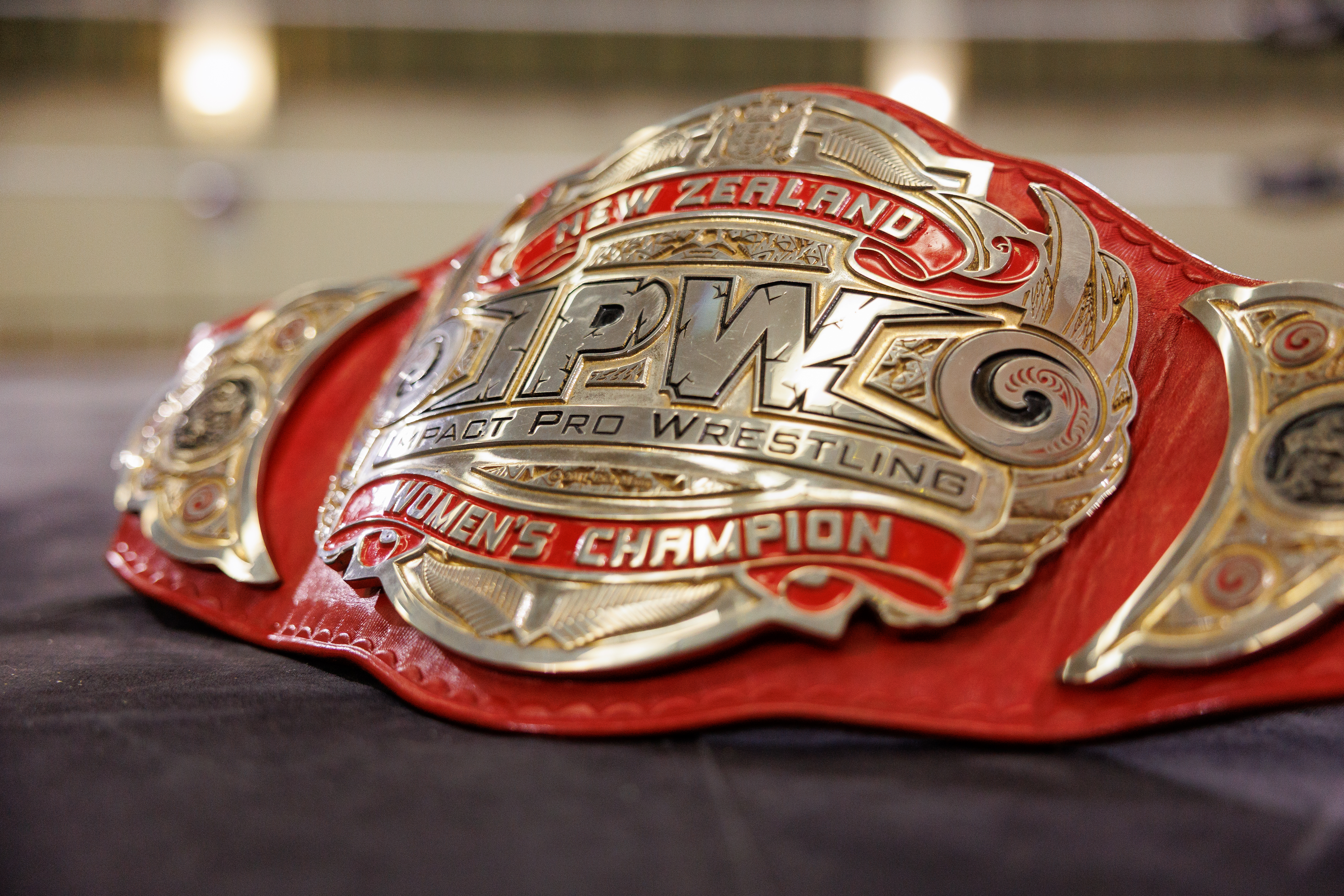

Details
- Promotion: Impact Pro Wrestling
- Date established: 18 August 2012
- Current champion: Amber Saint
- Date won: 20 September 2025
Statistics
- First champion: Evie
- Most reigns: Megan-Kate (5 reigns)
- Longest reign: Candy Lee (518 days)
- Shortest reign: Evie (1 day)
- Oldest champion: Megan-Kate (33 years, 331 days)
- Youngest champion: Emmy Driver (20 years, 83 days)

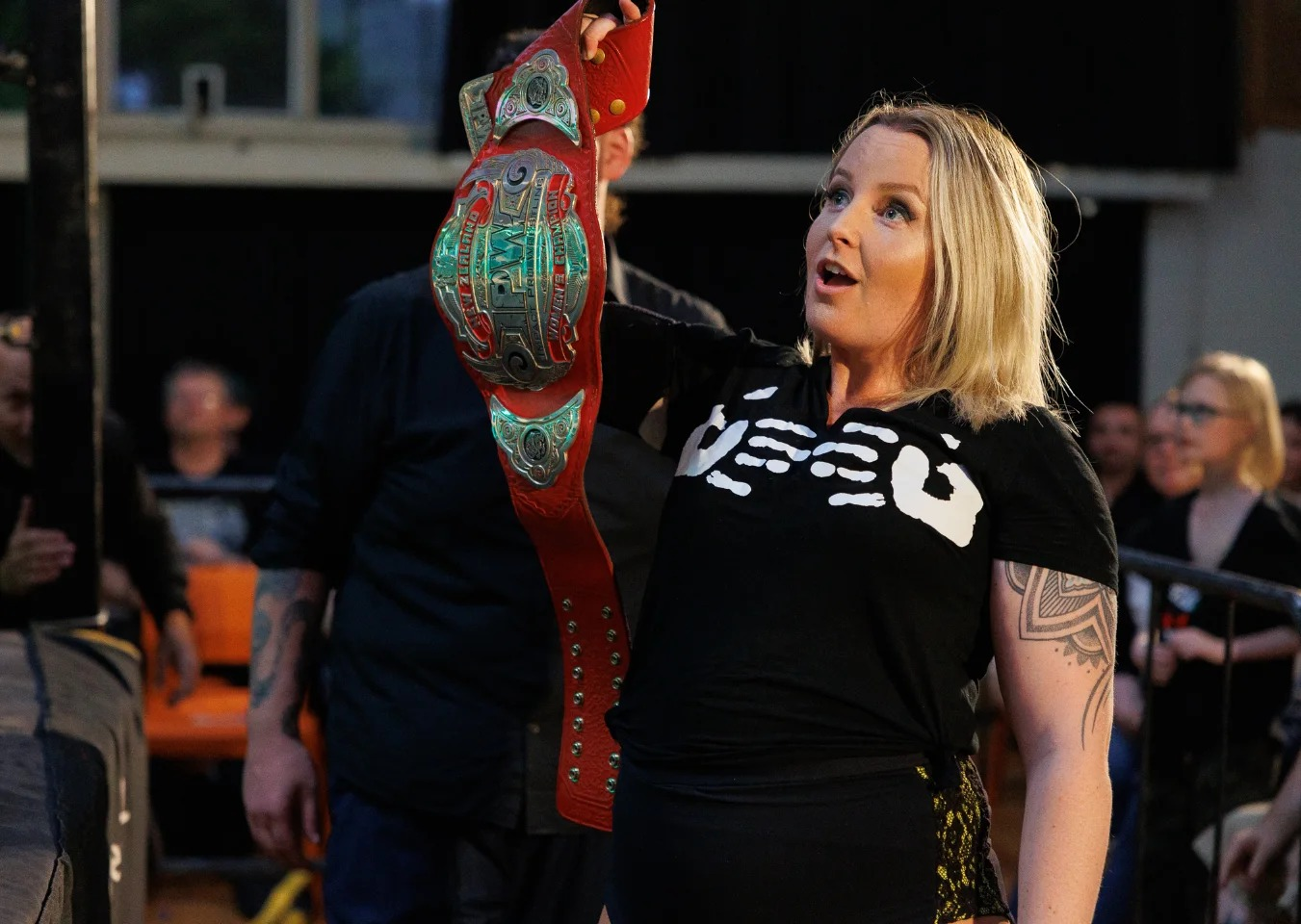
Record setting five-time IPW New Zealand Women's Champion Megan-Kate

The IPW New Zealand Women's Championship is the top women's professional wrestling championship title in the New Zealand promotion Impact Pro Wrestling. The current champion is Amber Saint who is in her second reign.

The championship is contested in professional wrestling matches. Originally introduced on February 12, 2012 at IPW Breakdown, a four-woman single elimination tournament was established to crown the inaugural champion. The semi-final rounds were Evie vs Olivia Shaw and Britenay vs Megan-Kate. Evie would defeat Olivia Shaw at Unleashed to advance. Britenay would defeat Megan-Kate in controversial fashion at Collision Course, as Megan-Kate was pinned while she had her foot on the ropes. Megan-Kate contested this outcome and would be granted a second chance by IPW Commissioner Dion McCracken at Taranaki Turmoil where Britenay would once again defeat her. The final was booked for IPW Destiny and scheduled as a singles match between Evie and Britenay, however, in the opening moments of the match, IPW Commissioner Dion McCracken added Megan-Kate into the contest, making the final a triple threat. Evie defeated Britenay and Megan-Kate to become the inaugural IPW New Zealand Women's Champion.

Megan-Kate holds the record for most reigns with five. At 518 days, Candy Lee's first reign was the longest in the title's history. Evie's third reign was the shortest in the history of the title at just one day. Overall, there have been 24 reigns shared between 10 wrestlers, with one interim title, and three vacancies.

== Title history ==
=== Reigns ===
Key
No.	Overall reign number
Reign	Reign number for the specific champion
Days	Number of days held
+	Current reign is changing daily

No.	Champion	Championship change			Reign statistics		Notes	Ref.
No.	Champion	Date	Event	Location	Reign	Days	Notes	Ref.
1	Evie	18 August 2012	Destiny	Lynfield	1	324	Defeated Britenay and Megan-Kate in a tournament final triple threat match.	
—	Vacated	8 July 2013	—	—	—	—	All IPW Championships were vacated in the lead up to Revival of the Fittest. At the event, Evie, Britenay, and Olivia Shaw fought to a no contest and the title remained vacant.	
2	Emmy Driver	31 August 2013	Steve Wrigley presents IPW Live	Lynfield	1	77	IPW General Manager Steve Wrigley awarded the vacant title to Emmy Driver.	
—	Vacated	16 November 2013	—	—	—	—	The championship was vacated after Emmy Driver quit IPW, refusing to face Evie at Last Chance.	
3	Evie	7 December 2013	Nightmare Before Xmas 2013	Lynfield	2	266	Defeated Britenay and Olivia Shaw in a triple threat elimination match for the vacant title.	
—	Britenay (Interim)	1 February 2014	The Good, The Bad & The Ugly	Lynfield	—	210	While lineal champion Evie was on tour in Japan with Pro Wrestling Zero1, IPW instated an interim championship in her absence. Britenay defeated Olivia Shaw to win the interim IPW New Zealand Women's Championship.	
4	Britenay	30 August 2014	Rival Turf	Lynfield	1	315	Britenay defeated lineal champion Evie in a falls count anywhere match to become the undisputed IPW New Zealand Women's Champion. IPW recognises this as the start of Britenay's first reign.	
5	Megan-Kate	11 July 2015	The Ultimate Prize	Mt. Albert	1	105		
6	Evie	24 October 2015	Armageddon Expo - Tag 1	Epsom	3	1		
7	Megan-Kate	25 October 2015	Armageddon Expo - Tag 2	Epsom	2	20		
8	Carmen Rose	14 November 2015	Damage Control	Alfriston	1	35		
9	Britenay	19 December 2015	Nightmare B4 X-Mas 2015	Lynfield	2	56	This was a triple threat match also involving Megan-Kate.	
10	Megan-Kate	13 February 2016	Fallout	Lynfield	3	33		
11	Britenay	17 March 2016	SPW Fight For Gold	Invercargill	3	275	This was the first time the IPW Women's Championship was won outside of Impact Pro Wrestling.	
12	Carmen Rose	17 December 2016	Nightmare Before Xmas	Mt. Albert	2	56		
13	Britenay	11 February 2017	Blood for Glory	Mt. Albert	4	308		
14	Candy Lee	16 December 2017	Nightmare Before Xmas	Mt. Eden	1	518		
15	Kellyanne	18 May 2019	Endgame	Mt. Eden	1	210		
16	Candy Lee	14 December 2019	Nightmare Before Christmas	ABA Stadium Mt. Eden	2	462		
17	Frankie Quinn	20 March 2021	March to War	Mt. Eden	1	126	This was a triple threat match also involving Britenay.	
18	Amber Saint	24 July 2021	Fans Bring the Weapons	Mt. Eden	1	504		
19	Candy Lee	10 December 2022	Nightmare Before Xmas	Mt. Eden	3	154		
20	Megan-Kate	13 May 2023	IPW XX	Mt. Eden	4	217	This was a four-way elimination match also involving Frankie Quinn and Britenay. Candy Lee was eliminated first, followed by Britenay, and finally Frankie Quinn.	
21	Frankie Quinn	16 December 2023	Nightmare Before Christmas	Mt. Albert	2	280	This was a Bat on a Pole match.	
22	Megan-Kate	21 September 2024	Fans Bring the Weapons	Mt. Albert	5	332	This was the first ever women's Fans Bring the Weapons match in New Zealand Pro Wrestling history.	
—	Vacated	19 August 2025	—	—	—	—	Megan-Kate vacated the championship due to a shoulder injury.	
23	Mighty Maia	20 September 2025	Fans Bring the Weapons	Mt. Albert	1	252	Defeated Candy Lee for the vacant title.	
24	Amber Saint	30 May 2026	The Eliminator	Freemans Bay	2	99+		

=== Combined reigns ===
As of September 6, 2026.

†	Indicates the current champion

Rank	Wrestler	No. of reigns	Combined days
1	Candy Lee	3	1,134
2	Britenay	4	954
3	Megan-Kate	5	707
4	Amber Saint †	2	603+
5	Evie	3	591
6	Frankie Quinn	2	406
7	Mighty Maia	1	252
8	Kellyanne	1	210
9	Carmen Rose	2	91
10	Emmy Driver	1	77
