= Leilani Tominiko =

Samoan–New Zealand professional wrestler

- Born: 30 August 1995 (age 31); Samoa
- Other name: Candy Lee
- Occupation: Professional Wrestler

Leilani Tominiko (born 30 August 1995) is a Samoan-New Zealander professional wrestler, better known by the ring name Candy Lee. She is the first openly transgender professional wrestler in New Zealand. She is a former IPW NZ Women's Champion and Maniacs United New Zealand Professional Wrestling Women's Champion.

== Early life ==
Tominiko was born in Samoa, and relocated to Auckland, New Zealand with her family when she was five years old. She has seven brothers and one sister. The family was raised in West Auckland, attending Liston College and later transferring to Kelston Girls' College. Tominiko was bullied by her peers as a child. She has noted that this bullying led her to watch WWE's Royal Rumble on television as a form of escapism, admiring the hyperfemininity which was then typical of the Divas division.

== Professional wrestling career ==
In 2016, Tominiko made her professional wrestling debut as Candy Lee with Impact Pro Wrestling, where she would go on to become a three-time IPW New Zealand Women's Champion and one-time Armageddon Cup winner. Tominiko has also wrestled for promotions such as Shimmer Women Athletes, Rise Wrestling, and Melbourne City Wrestling.

== Personal life ==
Tominiko identifies as fa'afafine and transgender. She is also vegan, as of 2018.

== Championships and accomplishments ==
- Impact Pro Wrestling
  - Armageddon Cup (1 time)
  - IPW New Zealand Women's Championship (3 times)
- Maniacs United
  - Maniacs New Zealand Professional Wrestling Women’s Champion (1 time)
- Pro Wrestling VIBE
  - Paris Is Bumping Grand Prize Championship (1 time)
- Professional Wrestling Entertainment
  - PWE Women's Championship (1 time)
