= Dallas Mead =

NZ rugby league footballer

Personal information
- Born: 1 August 1975 (age 51) New Zealand
- Weight: 120 kg (18 st 13 lb)

Playing information
- Position: Prop
Club
Years	Team	Pld	T	G	FG	P
1997	Warrington Wolves	2	0	0	0	0
Representative
Years	Team	Pld	T	G	FG	P
1998	New Zealand Māori

Dallas Mead (born 1 August 1975) is a New Zealand former professional wrestler, and professional rugby league footballer who played in the 1990s. He played at representative level for New Zealand Māori, and at club level for Auckland Warriors (Colts), and the Warrington Wolves, as a prop.

== Playing career ==
In 1995 Mead was signed by the new Auckland Warriors franchise and played for the Warriors Colts in the Lion Red Cup. He was part of the side that lost the Grand Final that year.

He was signed by Warrington on a one-year deal in 1997 and played his first game for the club on 21 January 1997. However, in just his second match, on 28 January, Mead suffered a serious knee injury. He was later informed that the injury required surgery and in April he returned to New Zealand to undergo an operation. Mead returned to the Warriors in 1998 and was selected for the New Zealand Māori tour of the Cook Islands.

== Later years ==
Mead later became a professional wrestler, and he competed in the 2007 NZPWI Invitational.
