= Vinny Dunn =

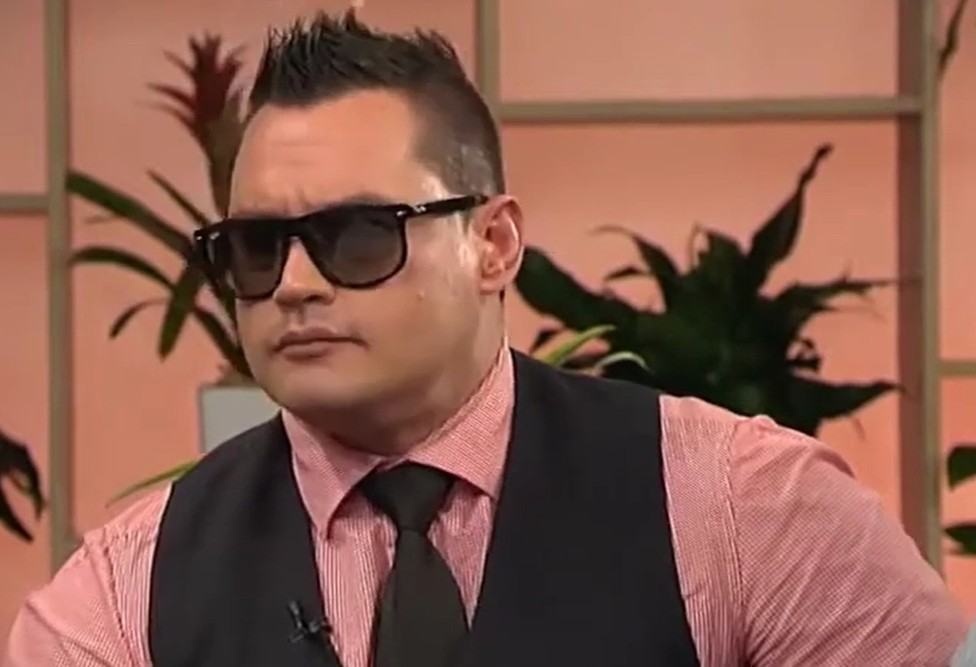
- Dunn in 2017

Personal information
- Born: 29 April 1980 (age 46) Whangaparaoa, Auckland, New Zealand
- Website: Vinny Dunn on Myspace

Professional wrestling career
- Ring name(s): "The One" Vinny Dunn; The One; Te Tahi
- Billed height: 5 ft 11 in (1.80 m)
- Billed weight: 120 kg (260 lb)
- Billed from: Hibiscus Coast aka The Promised Land
- Trained by: Impact Pro Wrestling
- Debut: 2005

Vincent "Vinny" Dunn is a New Zealand former professional wrestler and former professional rugby league footballer who has competed in several Australasian independent wrestling promotions since his debut in 2005. He has worked for the Australasian Wrestling Federation, Kiwi Pro Wrestling and is currently signed to Impact Pro Wrestling NZ (IPW). Recognized as the IPW's First Triple Crown Champion, he is a former IPW Heavyweight Champion and, in Impact Pro Wrestling Australia, is the first ever IPW South Pacific Champion, which he held from 18 August 2007 until 15 March 2008. Dunn also winner of the annual IPW Armageddon Cup at the 2006 Armageddon Expo.

== Professional wrestling career ==
=== Impact Pro Wrestling ===
==== 2005–2007 ====
Dunn made his wrestling debut in 2005 at Impact Pro Wrestling NZ's IPW Genesis in a loss against The Machine.

==== 2008 ====
At Last Rites, Dunn and Knox's match ended in a double disqualification (resulting in Knox retaining the title) caused by The Xtreme Superstars' Davey Deluxeo and Jordan Invincible.

==== IPW Champion (2009–2010) ====
On 12 December 2009 at IPW Nightmare Before Xmas, Dunn defeated Joseph Kinkade for the IPW New Zealand Heavyweight Championship.

On 29 May 2010, Dunn successfully retained the championship against Alexander in the main event of the IPW Genesis supercard. But Dunn was unexpectedly confronted by Reuben de Jong, who responded to the open challenge Dunn had issued the previous month. Dunn agreed to an impromptu title defence against de Jong, and was defeated to lose the championship.

Dunn regained the title on 21 August 2010, at IPW Rival Turf, only to lose it again later in the evening to "The Deal" Dal Knox. Dunn had intervened after the main event to rescue A-Class from an assault by a number of wrestlers from NZWPW, only to be attacked himself. Knox, returning from injury, entered the ring with steel chair in hand, only to turn the weapon on Dunn. While the NZWPW wrestlers prevented the IPW locker room from coming to Dunn's assistance, IPW Commissioner Dion McCracken ordered Dunn defend the title against Knox. McCracken then donned the referee's shirt to officiate the bout while Knox struck Dunn with numerous chair shots before pinning him to win the championship.

On 11 December 2010 at IPW Nightmare Before Xmas, Dunn defeated Dal Knox to become IPW Champion for the third time.

=== International exploits ===
Dunn toured in America with fellow IPW wrestler Jon E. King wrestling for Ohio Valley Wrestling, Rampage Pro Wrestling and WFX Wrestling in Canada.

== Personal life ==
Dunn played for the Hibiscus Coast Raiders in the 2002 Bartercard Cup.

In August 2007, was one of the bachelors in The Edge contest "Three Strangers and a Wedding". He was eliminated before the final 2 were picked by the bride-to-be.

== Championships and accomplishments ==
- Impact Pro Wrestling
  - IPW New Zealand Heavyweight Championship (4 times)
  - IPW New Zealand Tag Team Championship (1 time) – with Kingi
  - IPW South Pacific Championship (1 time)
  - Armageddon Cup (2 times)
- Pro Wrestling Illustrated
  - PWI ranked him #421 of the top 500 singles wrestlers in the PWI 500 in 2010
