= Reuben de Jong =

New Zealand martial artist and strongman

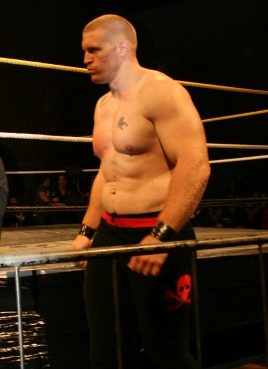
- Reuben de Jong at IPW Rival Turf, 21 August 2010
- Born: Martin Reuben de Jong; West Auckland, New Zealand
- Other names: The Man Mountain; New Zealand's Strongest Man
- Nationality: New Zealander
- Height: 2.08 m (6 ft 10 in)
- Weight: 140 kg (310 lb; 22 st)
- Division: Heavyweight
- Style: Kickboxing
- Fighting out of: Auckland, New Zealand
- Team: Ray Sefo's Fight Academy
- Trainer: Ray Sefo; Karl Webber
- Years active: 2006–present

Kickboxing record
- Total: 4
- Wins: 1
- By knockout: 1
- Losses: 3
- By knockout: 1

Mixed martial arts record
- Total: 2
- Wins: 2
- Losses: 0

Other information
- Mixed martial arts record from Sherdog

Reuben de Jong is a New Zealand heavyweight kickboxer, mixed martial artist, strongman and professional wrestler of Dutch descent. He is a two-time professional strongman champion of New Zealand and competed in the K-1 Kings of Oceania in 2006 and 2007. De Jong is the holder of two national records in the farmer's walk and stone lifting, and the Guinness World Record for running through the most panes of glass in under one minute. He was signed with WWE under the name of Russell Walker in 2011, but was released the same year.

A television actor and stuntman, De Jong has had small roles in Maddigan's Quest, Legend of the Seeker, and as Theokoles in Spartacus: Blood and Sand. In 2010, he entered professional wrestling and became one of the stars of Impact Pro Wrestling, capturing the IPW New Zealand Heavyweight Championship within two months of his debut. On 7 December 2019 he won the Hughes Academy Championship, pinning Spencer Kyle.

== Biography ==
=== Early career ===
Born in West Auckland, New Zealand, Reuben de Jong began working out while attending Waitākere College. In one of his first strongman performances, he won notice at the 134th Waipu Highland Games and "put pressure on the two lead contenders" Pat Hellier and Australian Craig Reid. Brian O'Brien, committee secretary for the Highland Games, told the New Zealand Press Association that de Jong had "competed well in a number of the strongman events and would be one to watch in the future".

He would eventually win the "New Zealand's Strongest Man" competition two consecutive years (2004 and 2005), and was able to "pull 17-tonne trucks without breaking a sweat". On 1 April 2006, he was among the strongmen invited to compete in Freddy Hooker's "Strongest Man in the World Ever — Aotearoa 2006" at Mount Maunganui. The competition was judged by Levi Vaoga. In July 2006, de Jong was featured in the Western Leader following his appearance as a Viking in a popular television advertisement. After Sarah Valentine talent spotted him he joined Background Talent, a New Zealand-based talent agency, where he landed roles in a number of feature films and television series including Maddigan's Quest, Narnia, Legend of the Seeker, and Spartacus: Blood and Sand. He was then in training as a Mixed Martial Arts fighter and studied under Karl Webber and Ray Sefo.

=== K-1 and Mixed martial arts ===
Reuben de Jong began his K-1 and MMA career shortly after graduating from Ray Sefo's Fight Academy. In the summer of 2006, he entered the K-1 Kings of Oceania, a qualifying tournament for the 2007 K-1 World Grand, at the Trusts Stadium on 24 June 2006. He lost to Jason Suttie in a 3rd-round decision in Round 1 and Peter Sampson via TKO in Round 2, however, he managed to score a second-round TKO over Simi Tai at Round 3 on 18 November 2006. At the 2007 K-1 Kings of Oceania, he suffered another 3rd-round decision loss to Jason Retti. On 27 October 2007, he fought to a split decision with Felise Leniu at Carnage in the Cage held at the ASB Stadium. He was also scheduled to face Sio Vitale and Alexei Ignashov during 2008, but took a break from professional fighting the next year.

=== Return to strongman competition ===
In January 2009, he and fellow New Zealand strongman Mick Cottrell represented the country at the 110th Browns Athletic Society's sporting carnival in competition against Australia's Craig Reid and Aaron Monks, and Scotland's Alastair Gunn and world champion caber tosser Malcolm Cleghorn. Sir Colin Earl Meads, a legendary rugby union lock forward for the All Blacks during the 1950s and 60s, was in attendance.

The next month, de Jong was interviewed by the Howick and Pakuranga Times while training for the upcoming Highland Games on 1 March. He was specifically preparing for the farmer's walk, in which competitors attempt to walk as far as they can while carrying 125 kg weights in each hand, and stated his intention to break his own national record. He had previously set the national record in this event at 251.5m as well as holding the New Zealand record for stone lifting.

On 24 July 2009, de Jong appeared on the first episode of NZ Smashes Guinness World Records where he broke the Guinness World Record for running through the most panes of glass (15) in under one minute. The record was previously held by Czech footballer Martin Latka who smashed through 11 panes of glass on German television earlier that year.

=== Professional wrestling ===
==== Impact Pro Wrestling NZ (2009–2011) ====
After nine months of training, de Jong made his debut as a professional wrestler for one of the country's three major promotions Impact Pro Wrestling, debuting in a Rookie Battle Royal match at IPW Nightmare Before Xmas 09, winning a contract with the company. His first match was against Les West defeating him at an IPW live event in Auckland on 20 March 2010; he made his television debut on IPW Ignition several weeks later.

On 29 May 2010, he defeated "The One" Vinny Dunn at the IPW Genesis supercard for the IPW New Zealand Heavyweight Championship. Dunn had beaten Alexander in the main event to retain the championship when he was unexpectedly confronted by de Jong, responding to the open challenge Dunn had issued to any pro wrestler in New Zealand the previous month, and Dunn agreed to face him in an impromptu match for the title. The match was later aired on 22 July edition of IPW Ignition.

De Jong lost the IPW New Zealand Heavyweight Championship back to "The One" Vinny Dunn on 21 August 2010, at IPW Rival Turf after he had been inadvertently struck in the head with a briefcase by his manager, Justin Lane. Dunn then forced de Jong to submit with an ankle lock.

==== World Wrestling Entertainment / WWE (2011) ====
In February 2011 Reuben signed a developmental contract with World Wrestling Entertainment, and began training at WWE's Florida Championship Wrestling developmental territory. De Jong is listed on FCW's roster under the name "Russell Walker." In June he was released.

==== Impact Pro Wrestling NZ Return (2011–2021) ====
De Jong returned to IPW at Nightmare B4 Xmas in December 2011 defeating Tykade and Dominic Le Fauce via DQ in a Land of The Giants match.

== Championships and accomplishments ==
=== Professional wrestling ===
- Impact Pro Wrestling
  - IPW New Zealand Heavyweight Championship (2 times)
  - Hughes Academy Championship (1 time)

=== Strongman competition ===
- 2004 New Zealand's Strongest Man
- 2005 New Zealand's Strongest Man

== Fight record ==
=== Kickboxing record ===
1 Win (1 (T)KO's), 3 Losses
Date	Result	Opponent	Event	Method	Round	Time
2007-04-14	Loss	(New Zealand) Jason Retti	K-1 Kings of Oceania 2007 Round 1, Auckland, New Zealand	Decision	3	3:00
2006-11-18	Win	(New Zealand) Simi Tai	K-1 Kings of Oceania 2006 Round 3, Auckland, New Zealand	TKO (Corner Stoppage)	2	3:00
2006-09-16	Loss	(New Zealand) Peter Sampson	K-1 Kings of Oceania 2006 Round 2, Auckland, New Zealand	TKO (Low kicks)	3	3:00
2006-06-24	Loss	(New Zealand) Jason Suttie	K-1 Kings of Oceania 2006 Round 1, Auckland, New Zealand	Decision	3	3:00

=== MMA record ===
2 Wins (2 decisions), 0 Losses
Date	Result	Opponent	Event	Method	Round	Time
2007-10-27	Win	(New Zealand) Felise Leniu	Carnage in the Cage, Auckland, New Zealand	Decision (Split)	3	5:00
1999-01-28	Win	(New Zealand) Gala Tolua	UE — New Zealand Vale Tudo: A Test of Courage, Auckland, New Zealand	Decision	0	

== See also ==
- List of male kickboxers
- List of male mixed martial artists
- List of strongman competitions
- List of K-1 events
