= Randy Valiente =

- Born: Randy Valiente Philippines
- Areas: Penciller, inker
- Notable works: Headlocked

Randy Valiente is a comic book artist born in the Philippines. He received several awards including the Writer's Prize for National Commission for Culture and the Arts, Gawad Tanglaw: Gawad Rustica Carpio para sa Sining ng Panulat and 'The Best Filipino Graphic Novel' for Comicon Asia 2018 for the book 'Wala Nang Tao sa Maynila'. His graphic novel 'Sining Killing' won the 2024 National Book Awards for The Best Graphic Novel in Filipino.

== Selected bibliography ==
- Headlocked by writer Michael Kingston, with art by Randy Valiente
- Reanimator (2016) by writer Keith Davidsen, with art by Randy Valiente
- Sining Killing (2023) by Randy Valiente
- No Man Manila (2025) by Randy Valiente
