= NZWPW Tag Team Championship =

Professional wrestling tag team championship

Details
- Promotion: New Zealand Wide Pro Wrestling
- Date established: 14 April 2007
- Current champions: The Wainui Express (Hayden and Jade Priest)
Statistics
- First champions: The Superlatives (Jean Miracle and Nick Silver)
- Most reigns: As a tag team: Company T (2 times); The Infinite Avalanche (2 times); The Wainui Express (Hayden Thiele and Jade Priest) (2 times) As an individual: Adam Avalanche (3 times); Ben Mana (3 times); Dan Stirling (3 times); Jade Priest (3 times)
- Longest reign: The Wainui Express (Hayden Thiele and Jade Priest) (3,016 days)
- Shortest reign: Dan Stirling and CD (<1 day)

The NZWPW Tag Team Championship is the top professional wrestling tag team championship title in the New Zealand promotion New Zealand Wide Pro Wrestling. The title was first won by The Superlatives (Jean Miracle and Nick Silver), who won a tournament final at Power Play IV in Lower Hutt, New Zealand to win the titles on 14 April 2007. It was the first title of its kind to be established by a major promotion since the NWA Australasian Tag Team Championship during the early 1980s and remains the oldest currently active tag team championship in New Zealand.

Former champions Rodeo Drive (Chad Howard and Bryant) with both the NZWPW and KPW Tag Team Championships

== Title history ==
Key
No.	Overall reign number
Reign	Reign number for the specific champion
Days	Number of days held

No.	Champion	Championship change			Reign statistics		Notes	Ref.
No.	Champion	Date	Event	Location	Reign	Days	Notes	Ref.
1	The Superlatives (Jean Miracle and Nick Silver)	14 April 2007	Power Play IV	Lower Hutt, New Zealand	1	14	Defeated CD and Dream Catcher in a tournament final.	
2	Company T (Dan Stirling and Rehua)	28 April 2007	Kukubash	Horowhenua, New Zealand	1	301		
3	The Infinite Avalanche (Adam Avalanche and Infinity)	23 February 2008	Pro Wrestling Summit	Lynfield, New Zealand	1	98	This was an interpromotional show co-hosted by the Australasian Wrestling Federation.	
4	Company T (Dan Stirling and Rehua)	31 May 2008	Power Play V	Lower Hutt, New Zealand	2	77		
5	The Infinite Avalanche (Adam Avalanche and Infinity)	16 August 2008	Invasion Tour	Wainui, New Zealand	2	181	Rehua walked out on his tag team partner during the match allowing Dan Stirling to be pinned by Adam Avalanche.	
—	Vacated	13 February 2009	Bringing Down The House	Petone, New Zealand	—	—	The championship is vacated when three of the participants, with the exception of Adam Avalanche, failed to appear. Avalanche attempted to defend the title in a singles match against Axl, however, he was attacked mid-match by Circus of Tragedy who then stole the belts. After previously missing a scheduled title defence at Te Ra O Te Raukura, the NZWPW’s Chief Wrestling Officer (CWO) said he would strip the champions and retire the titles if they did not appear at Bringing Down The House.	
6	The Circus of Tragedy (Dreamcatcher and O’Siris)	25 February 2009	NZWPW show	N/A	1	9	One week before Heretaunga Hellfire, "Dreamcatcher" Phil Woodgate announces The Circus of Tragedy have claimed the titles and begin defending them at NZWPW events.	
7	Dan Stirling (3) and CD	6 March 2009	Heretaunga Hellfire	Upper Hutt, New Zealand	1	0	The team is immediately stripped of the titles due to NZWPW rules prohibiting relatives of promoter Martin Stirling from holding the championship, and the belts are returned to The Circus of Tragedy. Stirling is then attacked by his tag team partner, CD, who is upset at losing the titles.	
8	The Circus of Tragedy (Dreamcatcher and O’Siris)	6 March 2009	Heretaunga Hellfire	Upper Hutt, New Zealand	2	48	The titles are returned to The Circus of Tragedy after Dan Stirling and CD are stripped of the championship. They are officially recognized as the tag team champions when the CWO reinstates the titles at Te Araroa on 9 April.	
9	Tykade and Ben Mana	23 April 2009	Power Play VI	Taita, New Zealand	1	92		
10	Adam Avalanche (3) and Ben Mana (2)	24 July 2009	Bringing Down the House	Petone, New Zealand	1	98	Won titles when Avalanche revealed his mystery tag team partner was one-half of the tag team champions Ben Mana. After attacking Tykade, Avalanche and Mana walked off with the belts.	
11	The Five Star Revolution (Travis Banks and JC Star)	30 October 2009	The Bay Bash	Titahi Bay, New Zealand	1	577	Adam Avalanche was forced to retire as a result of this match. They had defeated Corey Dallas and Rufguts in a tournament final earlier that night to receive a title shot.	
12	Project Mayhem ("Rufguts" Roddy Gunn and Johnny Idol)	12 August 2011	NZWPW show	Levin, New Zealand	1	288	A four corners elimination match crowned new champions.	
13	The Lost Boys (Mikey Rave and Taylor Adams)	26 May 2012	Newtown Knockout	Newtown, New Zealand	1	139	Tornado Tag	
14	The Circus of Tragedy (Axl (1) and Osiris with "Dream Catcher" Phil Woodgate)	12 October 2012	NZWPW show	Petone, New Zealand	3	302	Axl and Osiris, claiming to be the unofficial NZWPW Tag Team Champions after swiping the belts from the Lost Boys.	
15	The 20/20 Experience (Paul Sayers and Chad Howard)	10 August 2013	Road to PowerPlay X	Levin, New Zealand	1	287	In an impromptu title bout made by CWO Rehua, Chad Howard took Scravenge down with a northern lights suplex to claim the NZWPW Tag Team Championships.	
16	The Wainui Express (Hayden Thiele and Jade Priest)	24 May 2014	NZWPW show	Naenae, New Zealand	1	455		
17	Rodeo Drive (Charlie Roberts, Chad Howard (2) and Bryant)	22 August 2015	NZWPW show	Belmont, New Zealand	1	287	This match was contested as a 6-man tag match, with James Shaw joining The Wainui Express. Hayden Thiele was injured early, and left Shaw and Priest to defend the titles. Thiele would eventually submit to Chad Howard. Rodeo Drive currently hold the KPW and NZWPW Tag Team titles, defending them via the Freebird Rule.	
18	Ben Mana (3) and Jade Priest (2)	4 June 2016	Over The Top	Belmont, New Zealand	1	139		
19	Ebony and Ivory (Jade Priest and James Shaw)	21 October 2016	A Fighting Chance	Otaki, New Zealand	1	404	Ben Mana had to give up one half of the championship due to knee injuries. Jade Priest chose James Shaw as his replacement partner.	
—	Vacated	29 November 2017	—	—	—	—		
20	The Wainui Express (Hayden and Jade Priest (3))	20 July 2018	Friday Night Live Pro Wrestling	Epuni, New Zealand	2	3,016	The Wainui Express won a tag team tournament for the vacant championship.	

== List of combined reigns ==
Rank	Wrestlers	# of reigns	Combined days
1	The Wainui Express (Hayden and Jade Priest (3))	2	3,471+
2	The Five Star Revolution (Travis Banks and JC Star)	1	577
3	Ebony and Ivory (Jade Priest (3) and James Shaw)	1	404
4	Company T (Dan Stirling (3) and Rehua)	2	378
5	The Circus of Tragedy (Dreamcatcher, O’Siris and Axl (1))	3	359
6	Project Mayhem ("Rufguts" Roddy Gunn and Johnny Idol)	1	288
7	The 20/20 Experience (Paul Sayers and Chad Howard (2))	1	287
7	Rodeo Drive (Charlie Roberts, Chad Howard (2) and Bryant)	1	287
8	The Infinite Avalanche (Adam Avalanche (3) and Infinity)	2	279
9	The Lost Boys (Mikey Rave and Taylor Adams)	1	139
9	Ben Mana (3) and Jade Priest (3)	1	139
10	Adam Avalanche (3) and Ben Mana (3)	1	98
11	Tykade and Ben Mana (3)	1	92
12	The Superlatives (Jean Miracle and Nick Silver)	1	14
13	Dan Stirling (3) and CD	1	<1
