= NZWPW Heavyweight Championship =

Professional wrestling championship

Details
- Promotion: New Zealand Wide Pro Wrestling
- Date established: 3 December 2004
- Current champion: Bryant

Other name
- WPW Super Heavyweight Championship (2004–2005)
Statistics
- First champion: Ruamoko
- Most reigns: D-Hoya (5)
- Longest reign: Chad Howard (595 days)
- Shortest reign: Charlie Roberts (<1 day); Jade Priest (<1 day)

The NZWPW Heavyweight Championship is the top professional wrestling championship title in the New Zealand promotion New Zealand Wide Pro Wrestling (NZWPW). It was the original super heavyweight title of Wellington Pro Wrestling and introduced as the WPW Super Heavyweight Championship on 3 December 2004. The inaugural champion was Ruamoko, who defeated Les Barrett in a tournament final in Lower Hutt, New Zealand on 25 April 1992. The title became vacant when Ruamoko suffered an injury in early-2005 and, after the promotion became New Zealand Wide Pro Wrestling, it was replaced by the NZWPW Heavyweight Championship first won by Island Boy Si on 25 March 2005.

Former NZWPW Heavyweight champion, Axl

== Title history ==
Key
No.	Overall reign number
Reign	Reign number for the specific champion
Days	Number of days held

No.	Champion	Championship change			Reign statistics		Notes	Ref.
No.	Champion	Date	Event	Location	Reign	Days	Notes	Ref.
1	Ruamoko	3 December 2004	Colossus	Lower Hutt, New Zealand	1	N/A	Ruamoko defeated Les Barrett in a tournament final to become the first WPW Super Heavyweight Champion.	
—	Vacated	2005	—	—	—	—	The championship is vacated after Ruamoko is injured.	
2	Island Boy Si	25 March 2005	Powerplay II	Lower Hutt, New Zealand	1	224	Defeated The Punisher in a tournament final to win the vacant championship.	
3	Jonnie Juice	4 November 2005	Eruption II	Lower Hutt, New Zealand	1	161		
4	D-Hoya	14 April 2006	Powerplay III	Lower Hutt, New Zealand	1	98		
5	Adam Avalanche	21 July 2006	Pacific Storm	Lower Hutt, New Zealand	1	342		
6	D-Hoya	28 June 2007	The Big One	Lower Hutt, New Zealand	2	162	This was a Last Man Standing match.	
7	Jimmy Sparx	7 December 2007	Christmas Carnage	Lower Hutt, New Zealand	1	176	This was a Four Corners Tag match involving Axl and Rufguts.	
8	D-Hoya	31 May 2008	Powerplay V	Lower Hutt, New Zealand	3	77		
—	Vacated	16 August 2008	Invasion Tour	Wainui, New Zealand	—	—	The championship is vacated on the first night of the tour after a Triple Threat match involving D-Hoya, Jimmy Sparx and Rufguts ended in a no-contest. An 8-man tournament is held for the duration of the tour.	
9	D-Hoya	14 November 2008	The Big One	Lower Hutt, New Zealand	4	378	Defeated Jimmy Sparx in tournament final to win the vacant championship.	
10	Rufguts	27 November 2009	Movember	Lower Hutt, New Zealand	1	204	X-Rated was the special referee.	
11	Tykade	19 June 2010	Powerplay VII	Lower Hutt, New Zealand	1	258	This was a No Disqualification match. D-Hoya was the special referee.	
12	"Rufguts" Roddy Gunn	4 March 2011	Over The Top	Lower Hutt, New Zealand	2	175		
13	D-Hoya	26 August 2011	Powerplay VIII	Lower Hutt, New Zealand	5	259		
—	Vacated	11 May 2012	Bringing Down the House	Petone, New Zealand	—	—		
14	Ben Mana	15 June 2012	Powerplay IX	Lower Hutt, New Zealand	1	61		
—	Vacated	15 August 2012	Right 2 Challenge	Otaki, New Zealand	—	—	Ben Mana injured his knee winning the title against Jakob Cross at Powerplay IX	
15	Tykade	2 November 2012	The Bushwacker Luke's Return	Taitā, New Zealand	2	42	Defeated James Shaw in the NZWPW tournament final	
16	Johnny Idol	14 December 2012	Mayhem in the Valley	Stokes Valley, New Zealand	1	155	Cashed in his Right 2 Challenge opportunity and won	
17	James Shaw	18 May 2013	Ngaio Evolution	Ngaio, New Zealand	1	14	Defeated Johnny Idol in an "I Quit" match	
18	Johnny Idol	1 June 2013	Over the Top	Wainuiomata, New Zealand	2	97	Defeated James Shaw, Travis Banks, and Rufguts	
19	Ben Mana	6 September 2013	Powerplay X	Lower Hutt, New Zealand	2	294	Defeated Johnny Idol in a Last Man Standing match	
20	"Rufguts" Roddy Gunn	27 June 2014	Beat Down (2014)	Petone, New Zealand	3	85	Rufguts invoked the Right 2 Challenge he won in October 2013 for another chance at the NZWPW Championship and won	
21	"Dream Catcher" Phil Woodgate	20 September 2014	Road to Rescue (2014)	Waikanae, New Zealand	1	252	Defeated Paul Sayers and "Rufguts" Roddy Gunn	
22	Ben Mana	30 May 2015	Wairoa Warzone (2015)	Wairoa, New Zealand	3	300	Defeated "Dream Catcher" Phil Woodgate	
23	Jade Priest	25 March 2016	Live Pro Wrestling - Belmont Series	Wairoa, New Zealand	1	<1	Defeated Ben Mana	
24	Chad Howard	25 March 2016	Live Pro Wrestling - Belmont Series	Belmont, New Zealand	1	595	Cashed in his Right 2 Challenge contract and defeated Jade Priest	
25	Charlie Roberts	10 November 2017	Powerplay 2017	Epuni, New Zealand	1	<1	Defeated Chad Howard	
26	Axl	10 November 2017	Powerplay 2017	Epuni, New Zealand	1	280	Axl cashed in his Right 2 Challenge contract and defeated Charlie Roberts	
27	Wayne La Perfeccion	17 August 2018	Friday Night Live Pro Wrestling	Epuni, New Zealand	1	28	Defeated Axl & "The Shooter" Shane Sinclair in a triple threat match	
28	Bryant	14 September 2018	Friday Night Live Pro Wrestling	Epuni, New Zealand	1	2,960	Defeated Wayne La Perfeccion	

== List of combined reigns ==
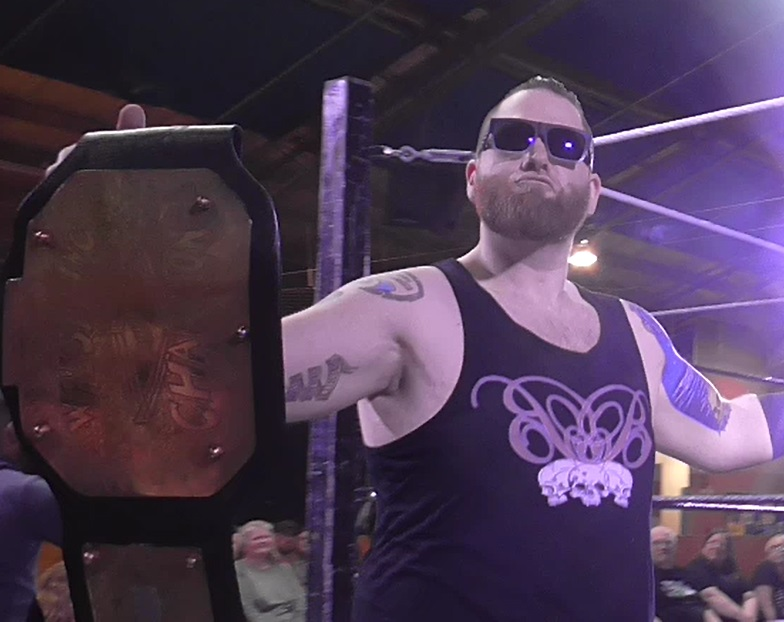
Current champion, Bryant

Longest reigning champion, Chad Howard

Rank	Wrestler	# of reigns	Combined days
1	Bryant	1	2,960
2	D-Hoya	5	974
3	Ben Mana	3	655
4	Chad Howard	1	595
5	"Rufguts" Roddy Gunn	3	463
6	Adam Avanche	1	342
7	Tykade	2	300
8	Axl	1	280
9	"Dream Catcher" Phil Woodgate	1	252
10	Johnny Idol	2	252
11	Island Boy Si	1	224
12	Jimmy Sparx	1	176
13	Jonnie Juice	1	161
14	Wayne La Perfeccion	1	28
15	James Shaw	1	14
16	Charlie Roberts	1	<1
17	Jade Priest	1	<1
