= Impact Pro Wrestling =

New Zealand professional wrestling promotion

- Acronym: IPW
- Founded: 2003
- Headquarters: Auckland, New Zealand
- Founder(s): Cameron Bailey; Chuck Warner; Nick Fergusson
- Owner(s): Cameron Bailey (2003–2011); Chuck Warner (2003–2011); Nick Fergusson (2003–2011); Nathan Fenwick (2011–2013); Daniel Burnell (2011–2013); Dave Gerbault (2011–2013)
- Formerly: Mania Pro Wrestling (2000–2003)
- Website: impactprowrestling.co.nz

Impact Pro Wrestling (IPW), also known as New Zealand Impact Pro Wrestling, is a New Zealand professional wrestling promotion. It has promoted regular events throughout the country and abroad in the last several years and is credited for being the first to bring live wrestling shows to cities, such as Hamilton and Whangārei, in over two decades.

A staple of Armageddon Expo since 2002, its annual "Armageddon Cup" supercard was a major attraction at the event in subsequent years. IPW frequently visited Australia during the early 2000s, in conjunction with Peter Ball's Gold Coast-based Major Impact Wrestling, and the two companies merged to form a sister promotion, Impact Pro Wrestling Australia, in 2007.

That same year, the promotion signed a deal with Sky Network Television's ALT TV to broadcast a weekly television show, IPW Ignition, which aired throughout the country as the first wrestling programme seen in New Zealand since Steve Rickard's On the Mat during the 1980s. It was later picked up by Canterbury Television and Triangle TV in late 2008, shortly before ALT TV's demise, and remains the longest-running wrestling series in New Zealand.

In 2011 IPW began a new weekly show entitled Mana Mamau which aired on Maori Television to replace Ignition. Mana Mamau aired its final episode in 2012.

The promotion has been home to several of New Zealand's top independent wrestlers including Jamie Tagataese, Candy Lee, Reuben de Jong, Kingi, and Vinny Dunn, all of whom having been featured in the New Zealand national media, as well as appearances from major American stars such as Christy Hemme, Rob Van Dam, Raven, Disco Inferno, The Sandman, "The Million Dollar Man" Ted DiBiase, and Jake "The Snake" Roberts.

== History ==
=== Mania Pro Wrestling and the Armageddon Expo (2000–2003) ===
Former logo used from 2003 to 2013

IPW’s origins date to the year 2000 when a group of aspiring independent wrestlers began training under Steve Hodgson at Mania, an Auckland-based gym which specialised in training female martial artists and stunt actors, promoting events locally under the banner of Mania Pro Wrestling. After running two house shows in 2001, MPW held an exhibition show at the Aotea Centre during the 2002 Armageddon Expo. Their performance proved popular with the crowd and were invited back by promoters for the 2003 expo. Wrestling would eventually become a regular feature attraction at the pop culture event holding its annual "Armageddon Cup" every year since then.

The beginning of 2003 saw a management change take place at MPW, resulting in an exodus of talent and a commitment to start a new promotion, IPW. The new brand made its debut at Armageddon in May 2003. At this time Peter Lane, a former New Zealand wrestling talent from the 'On the Mat' era, was introduced to the company as a new training figure. Peter's years of experience proved an invaluable asset to the maturing wrestling of the new breed of New Zealand Professional Wrestler.

=== Early years of Impact Pro Wrestling (2003–2004) ===
In 2003, the new promotion was formed by a core group of MPW wrestlers under Cameron "The Economist" Bailey, Chuck "The Machine" Warner and Nick "Daddy Kool" Fergusson who pooled their money to start Impact Pro Wrestling. After a year's worth of fundraising, they were able to purchase a custom-built wrestling ring and a training facility where they began running monthly shows soon after. In 2003 IPW held its first event outside Auckland appearing at the Michael Fowler Centre in Wellington for 2003 Armageddon Expo. It was at this event that the promotion held its first-ever "Armageddon Cup" supercard with The Economist eliminating Joey Kinkade in an interpromotional battle royal between wrestlers from IPW and New Zealand Wide Pro Wrestling.

=== National expansion and IPW Ignition (2004–2007) ===
With the acquisition of a new ring and training facilities, IPW was prepared to achieve its first goal of running regular house shows in the Auckland area. Beginning with Genesis at Pt. Chevalier in May 2004, IPW began staging monthly shows in central Auckland. Within two years, IPW was holding regular shows not only in Auckland but throughout the country. They also had one of the largest rosters with approximately 25 wrestlers in Auckland. In May 2005, TVNZ's Hadyn Jones conducted an interview with The Economist and The Machine at their Auckland gym.

Taking its show on the road, IPW hosted New Zealand Wide Pro Wrestling at Capital Punishment in Wellington in March 2006. Five months later, they participated in the 2006 NZPWI Invitational, a major interpromotional event promoted by NZPWI.co.nz founder Dion McCracken, which included New Zealand Wide Pro Wrestling, Kiwi Pro Wrestling and Australia's Major Impact Wrestling. Held on 12 August 2006, at the Lynfield YMCA, McCracken served as IPW's colour commentator at the event. A legitimate black belt in tae kwon do, he knocked out IPW wrestler "Handsome" Danny Jacobs with a superkick during the "Eliminator" battle royal. This incident was voted by NZPWI.co.nz visitors (22.9%) as the "Best Moment" for the New Zealand wrestling category.

IPW enjoyed rousing success when it presented Coastal Assault in October 2006 at Stanmore Bay on the Hibiscus Coast, the North Auckland town which is home to "The One" Vinny Dunn. At the end of the year, IPW stars Alexander and Ricky DeVinal appeared in a television commercial for Primo, a brand of flavoured milk popular in New Zealand. In January 2007, "Double D" Davey Deluxeo appeared with WWE World Heavyweight Champion Dave Batista in Auckland's Central Leader newspaper ahead of the 2007 WWE Road to WrestleMania 23 tour. This marked an IPW wrestler's first official interaction with an active WWE wrestler since MPW hosted former WWE Champion John "Bradshaw" Layfield for a morning in 2002.

A month later, it was announced that IPW had achieved its first long-term goal by securing a television deal with Auckland's ALT TV. The first episode of "IPW Ignition", which featured footage from its recent IPW New Year's Bash supercard, aired on 10 February 2007. Appearing nationwide on SKY Network Television, it was the first weekly wrestling series to be broadcast in the country since Steve Rickard's "On the Mat" in the 1980s. It was later made available for a worldwide audience via the internet thanks to Alt TV's shift to live online streaming. A year later, it was also shown on Canterbury Television and Triangle TV; the first episode on CTV premiered on 5 October 2008. As of 2010, it remains the longest-running wrestling series in New Zealand.

On the same night "IPW Ignition" aired, IPW made its Whangārei debut staging IPW Collision at the Forum North venue to a sold-out crowd. Dion McCracken, who was instrumental in bringing IPW to Northland, made a guest appearance during the show as a referee, officiating in the match between "The Deal" Dal Knox and "Handsome" Danny Jacobs. It had been over 25 years since wrestling had been held there. Notable New Zealand wrestler of yesteryear Jock Ruddock was present in the live audience. Bruno Bekkar, a one-time NWA New Zealand Heavyweight Champion, also made a guest appearance at a sold-out show in Auckland on 15 March. On 24 March, IPW made its first appearance in Hamilton at The Meteor, which hosted the event "IPW Breaking Point" in which featured a battle royal for the #1 Contendership match which was won by Roger Ventura. McCracken joined the promotion as a full-time colour commentator that year and assisted in arranging shows in various cities. Mema Maeli, the first women to become a ring announcer for Samoa's boxing association, also joined the promotion as IPW's sole female announcer.

In October 2007, at the 2007 Armageddon Expo, Kid Liger won a 25-man battle royal to win the "Armageddon Cup". On the final day of the convention, at the Aotea Centre in Auckland, Raven made a surprise appearance by attacking Joseph Kinkade after his match against John Questions. Kinkade's manager Gary O. Davis had insulted him earlier in the show. Christy Hemme and Rob Van Dam also attended the show, Hemme being involved in a storyline with Danny Jacobs. Later that month, IPW wrestlers "Double D" Davey Deluxeo, Vinny Dunn and Alfred Valentine were profiled by the New Zealand Herald. Troy Rawhiti-Forbes, another New Zealand independent wrestler known to MPW and IPW audiences as "Superstar" Troy Daniels, was also interviewed and discussed both the early history of the promotion as well as professional wrestling in New Zealand itself.

At the house show "Nightmare B4 Xmas" in December 2007, IPW also saw the rebirth of the women's division. Long Dormant since the Mania Pro Wrestling days in the early 2000s, the intergender tag match between Handsome Danny Jacobs and Britenay vs The Samoan Silverback Alexander and Evie saw the first two females competing within the revamped IPW. The following year saw the return of two females that were involved with Mania, Just Plain Evil and Alita Capri.

IPW also began expanding oversees as well and frequently visited Australia during the early 2000s. Closely associated with Peter Ball's Major Impact Wrestling in the Gold Coast, the two companies were involved in interpromotional events and talent exchanges for five years before eventually merging to form a sister promotion, Impact Pro Wrestling Australia, in the summer of 2007. IPW would continue exchanging talent between New Zealand and Australia during the next few years.

=== Recent years (2008–present) ===
==== 2008 ====
On 19 April 2008, Raven and Disco Inferno attended the 2008 Armageddon Convention in Wellington. Disco Inferno won the Armageddon Cup in a battle royal but lost the cup to Davey Deluxeo at the Christchurch convention a week later. He also wrestled a tag team match on 27 April 2008 at the same convention. His partner was IPW Champion "The Deal" Dal Knox.

In May, Davey Deluxeo and Jordan Invincible were interviewed by the New Zealand Herald. The two wrestlers, referred by the publication as the "best tag team partnership since Kiwi tag team The Bushwhackers", talked about impressing WWE road agents when World Wrestling Entertainment when the organisation came to New Zealand for shows in Auckland and Christchurch the next month. At IPW's Redemption, Jordan Invincible defeated Dal Knox to win the IPW New Zealand Heavyweight Championship for the first time. His victory was partially due to outside interference from Davey Deluxeo who used his Armageddon Cup as a weapon or foreign object against Knox.

On 5 October 2008, the promotion took part in "Connecting Families Day" at the Ellerslie YMCA. Attended by an estimated 1,500 people, the four-hour event included demonstrations from IPW wrestlers as well as an appearance from New Zealand children's entertainer Linda Adamson as part of her upcoming DVD "Love to Sing". Several IPW wrestlers were also featured on 10 October edition Television New Zealand's IAM TV where the host took part in training sessions at their IPW facility in Auckland.

The Sandman appeared at the 2008 Armageddon convention in Auckland, New Zealand, wrestling for Impact Pro Wrestling NZ between 25 and 27 October 2008. He defeated Joseph Kinkade in his first match and The Machine in his second match, both with the White Russian Legsweep. He then teamed up with IPW New Zealand Heavyweight Championship holder "The Deal" Dal Knox in a tag match against Kinkade and The Machine, which saw Knox take the win with a Knox Out on Kinkade.

==== Pro Wrestling Entertainment invasion (2008–09) ====
At "Breakdown" in May 2008 Justin Lane, founder of failed promotion Pro Wrestling Entertainment (PWE) turned up and cost Kommissioner Kool his match against Jon E. King. Afterwards Lane gave King a PWE T-shirt, which King gratefully accepted. At "Redemption" in June King and Lane announced that they were taking over IPW, and on an "Ignition" taping they made threats that they would win their match against Kool and his chosen partner at "Unbreakable" in July, with the winning team getting the IPW Commissionership. For the match at "Unbreakable" Kool chose The Machine as his partner; however, The Machine turned on Kool and joined PWE as an enforcer, giving King the IPW Commissionership in the process. The trio recruited the tag team Saint Chaos (Brian Saint James and Curt Chaos) at "Unleashed" in September after helping them defeat Pirates And Ninjas Are Totally Awesome (Pirate Jason Burns and Ninja Liam Fury). The Machine executed the Machine Head on Ninja Liam Fury, Jon E. King grabbed the bell when the referee attempted to disqualify Saint Chaos and ordered the referee to count the pinfall. Finally at "Rival Turf" in October King won the IPW South Pacific Championship.

However, at "Nightmare B4 Xmas" in December, Team IPW (Link Van Haggard, Kid Liger, Pirate Jason Burns and Ninja Liam Fury) defeated Team PWE (Jon E. King, The Machine, Brian Saint James and Curt Chaos) in an 8-man match to cost King his IPW Commissionership, at "Breaking Point" in March 2009 King lost the South Pacific Championship to Lil T (with help from guest referee "Te Tahi" Vinny Dunn) and at IPW Genesis 2009 each member of PWE wrestled an IPW wrestler. Jordan Invincible defeated Curt Chaos, Brian Saint James defeated Les West (with help from Curt Chaos), Daddy Kool defeated Justin Lane (despite interference from the rest of PWE), Jon E. King defeated Vinny Dunn and "The Deal" Dal Knox defeated The Machine in a Lights Out Death Match. Due to IPW winning the series 3–2 the PWE faction was forced to disband immediately. All PWE paraphernalia were banned from IPW shows and the members were banned from teaming together as a fivesome for six months.

==== 2009 ====
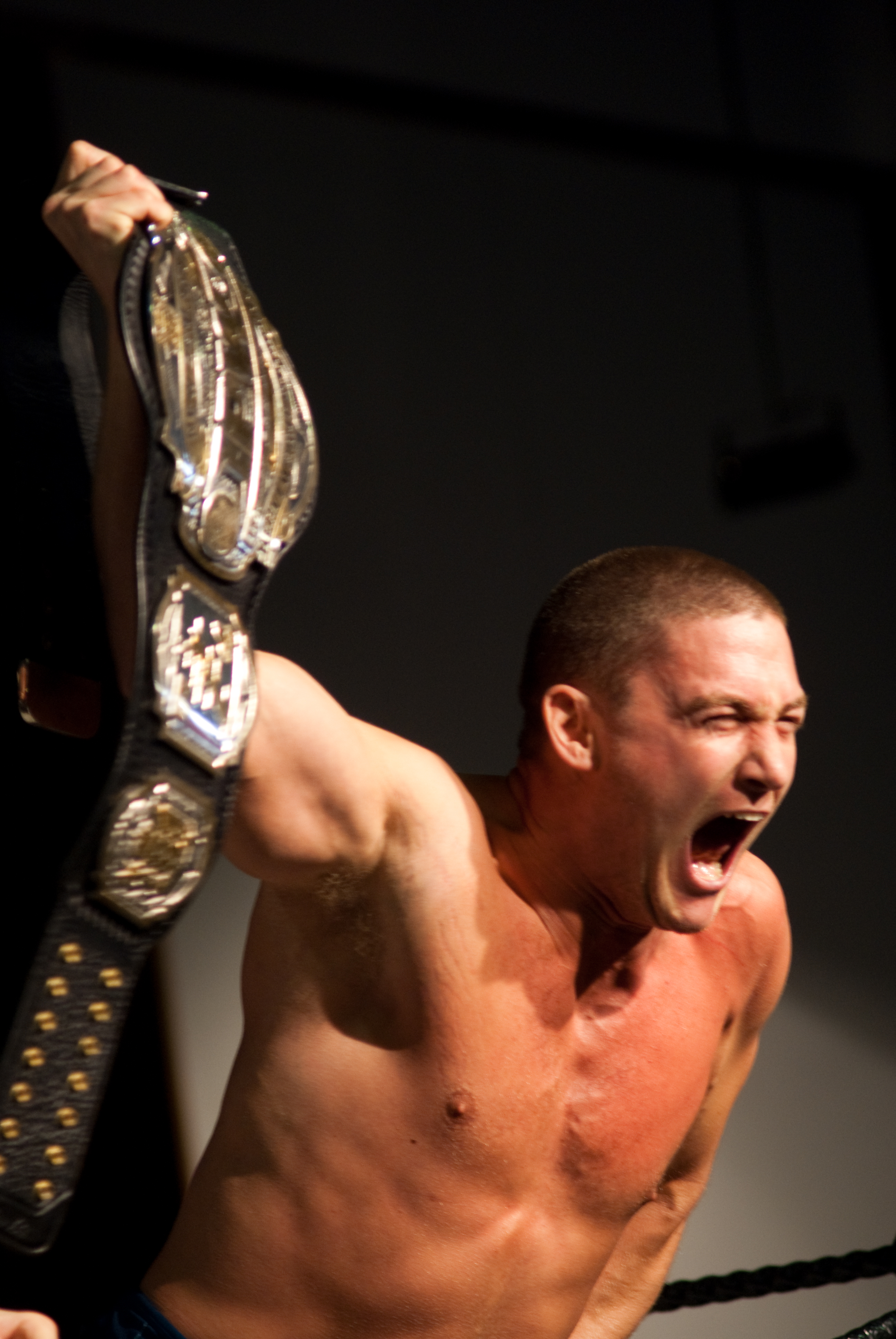
Joseph Kinkade at the Armageddon Expo 2009, holding the IPW New Zealand Heavyweight Championship belt

On 4 April 2009, IPW returned to 2009 Armageddon Expo where the "Armageddon Cup" was decided in a 17-person battle royal which included female wrestler Just Plain Evil. She was the first women to ever compete in a battle royal in New Zealand. The winner, Les West, was to face the then IPW New Zealand Heavyweight Champion Dal Knox for the title. Parts of the event were filmed for A Kiwi Century on the Mat, an upcoming historical documentary on professional wrestling in New Zealand, as well as conducted interviews with colour commentator Dion McKracken and then IPW New Zealand Champion Dal Knox. On 1 May, in celebration of Free Comic Book Day, IPW took part in a special fundraiser for the Onehunga Primary School library organised by Gotham Comics in Onehunga which raised nearly $500. The event was attended by over 800 people and an estimated 3,000 comic books were given away.

On 20 July, 20/20 aired a special report on professional wrestling in New Zealand featuring IPW and its Wellington rivals Kiwi Pro Wrestling and New Zealand Wide Pro Wrestling. Dal Knox, then IPW Heavyweight Champion, was specifically profiled during the program. Also that summer, the promotion was similarly profiled on the Māori Television sports show Hyundai Code.

In September 2009, local Auckland band 'These Four Walls' released their music video Sweet December, starring IPW's very own Evie, Britenay, Liam Fury and Brian St James.

In August 2009, Whangaparaoa wrestler "The One" Vinny Dunn was interviewed by Stuff.co.nz prior to his match at IPW's "Nightmare B4 Xmas" supercard at Westlake Boys High School where he would wrestle Joseph Kinkade, O Davis and Ivanoff for a chance at the IPW New Zealand Heavyweight Championship. He also discussed his claiming the Impact Pro Wrestling South Pacific Championship in Australia and recent victory over Jon E. King in a "brutal" best of five series to become top contender for the national title. Alita Capri, one of IPW's five female wrestlers, was also interviewed for her upcoming match at the event and encouraged fans to bring items to the show that could be used as foreign objects. She expressed an interest in helping establish a serious women's division in the near future and hoped that more young women would become interested in following the sport.

The annual NZPWI peoples choice awards for the years 2008 and 2009 saw IPW clean up all categories. The most recent peoples choice awards saw "The One" Vinny Dunn pick up 'Best Wrestler', Pirates and Ninjas are Totally Awesome (Pirate Burns, Ninja Fury) pick up 'Best Tag Team' and Evie for 'Best Female'. IPW also picked up the award for 'Best Promotion', with a majority vote of 61.2%.

==== 2010 ====
"New Years Bash" started off the year, with freshly crowned IPW champion "The One" Vinny Dunn to battle IPW Australia's South Pacific Champion "The future" Nick Burns. The match ended in a no-contest, after rampant interference from Gary O. Davis, and both men therefore retained each of their respective titles.

The following month at "Coastal Assault", Vinny took on "The Professional" Joseph Kinkade. Under the guidance from his manager Gary O. Davis, Kinkade dominated for most of the match with the help of tag team partner Mischa Ivanoff. Peter Lane managed to somewhat even the score by taking Ivanoff out of action to the outside, and Dunn hit his finisher to retain. Also during this show, The women's match between JPE and Evie saw the first pinfall over the dominant JPE by Evie since her debut the year prior.

"The One" Vinny Dunn and Jon E. King featured on Maori TV's Sports show, Hyundai Code. Here, Dunn and King wrestled in New Zealands first ever live match, and Dunn managed to retain over former IPW champion, Jon E. King. Dunn and King also featured on the after-school programme, 'The Erin Simpson Show'.

"Extreme Measures" in April saw the crowning of the first ever IPW tag team champions, via elimination match that all tag teams in IPW would compete. "The Professional" Joseph Kinkade and Mischa Ivanoff were the last in the ring, squaring off against Pirate Burns and Ninja Fury. While Burns and Kinkade brawled to the outside, Fury hit a huge Shooting Star Press on Ivanoff. Pirates and Ninjas are Totally Awesome were then crowned the first ever tag team champions in IPW history.

IPW's Fallout saw Ninja Liam Fury team up with 'Wrestlings Most Wanted' in the absence of Pirate Burns, in order to defend the IPW Tag Team belts against Saint Chaos. Brian Saint James and Curt Chaos were crowned the new IPW Tag champs that night.

===== The Era of The Deal & the Devil =====
2010's major storyline began in May at IPW Genesis, The main event at IPW's "Genesis" saw "The One" Vinny Dunn and The Samoan Silverback Alexander go head to head, but The Silverback failed to get the win. The end of the match was interrupted by Justin Lane, who stated that when Dunn put out an open challenge for the championship, Alexander was not the only man to sign a contract for a title shot. He introduced that his 'monster' of a wrestler, Reuben De Jong, had responded to the challenge that would happen that night. The champion tried to retain, but the odds were against him and former heavyweight kickboxer and MMA fighter De Jong delivered a powerful double-handed chokeslam to take the win, and to be crowned new IPW champion. This being the most shocking moment of 2010 so far, would start one of the most heated feuds in IPW history.

Immediately after the show, Vinny Dunn's manager, Peter Lane advised the IPW Community that Vinny Dunn would cash in his rematch clause at IPW Breakdown; however, Justin Lane revealed that his client, the new IPW NZ Heavyweight Champion, Reuben De Jong, did not sign any contract for a rematch and was threatening legal action against IPW. Three days later after the initial threat was made, IPW Commissioner Dion McCraken posted a video stating that he would postpone the show and that the rematch would take place at Manurewa Recreation Centre the following month.

During NZWPW's Power Play show, "Te Tahi" Vinny Dunn and Jon E King invaded the show after threats made by the Wellington promotion of turning up to IPW Genesis. It was at this show that Dunn suffered an injury and at IPW Breakdown, the IPW Commissioner Dion McCracken revealed that Vinny Dunn had failed his fitness test and rescheduled the match for Reuben De Jong vs "The Samoan Silverback" Alexander in which De Jong retained.

At IPW Rival Turf, the anticipated re-match between "Te Tahi" Vinny Dunn and IPW Champion, Reuben De Jong took place with Vinny Dunn being crowned the new IPW Champion, after making the 6'3 giant tap out to the Ankle Lock after Reuben De Jong was accidentally hit in the head with a briefcase by his own manager, Justin Lane. However, the new reign was short-lived after a shock turn of events in the main event of that evening, involving IPW's Pro Wrestling Excellence and NZWPW saw the returning "The Deal" Dal Knox turn against his best friend and take the IPW New Zealand Heavyweight Championship from him with assistance from the IPW Commissioner, Dion McCracken much to the disgust and shock of the IPW fans and even the IPW roster and staff which has now been labelled "The Westlake Screwjob".

At IPW Fallout, the IPW Commissioner, Dion McCracken revealed his master plan alongside his "perfect champion" "The Deal" Dal Knox, stating that he was responsible for instigating the match at IPW Genesis between Reuben De Jong and Vinny Dunn and that he did not fail his fitness test at IPW Breakdown and actually withdrew the rematch on purpose, he later on revealed that Dunn was in his eyes a "transitional champion" and was just waiting till Dal Knox was able to return which was at Rival Turf where he organised the alliance between NZWPW, Pure Wrestling Excellence, Knox and himself. McCracken also stated that Vinny Dunn would not receive a rematch that night and that if Vinny Dunn was to strike either himself or the Champion, he would be suspended indefinitely to which Dunn ignored and struck the Commissioner with a right hand.

At IPW Unleashed, Vinny Dunn was suspended indefinitely due to the attack he made at the previous show and for not "apologizing" to the Commissioner and the Champion stating that "he would never toe the line", McCracken responded by removing his rematch clause and suspended the former champion indefinitely from all competition in Impact Pro Wrestling.

During IPW's annual show at the Armageddon Expo in Auckland "Te Tahi" Vinny Dunn was fired despite following Dion McCracken's orders to gather 500 people for the next session. In the last session the IPW Armageddon Cup was on the line, with the winner being able to wrestle for the IPW New Zealand Heavyweight title at any stage. Halo won the 20-person Gauntlet match and the chance to face the IPW New Zealand Heavyweight Champion. However, as the IPW Commissioner, Dion McCracken, presented the Cup to Halo, it was revealed that "Te Tahi" Vinny Dunn was under the mask and now with the Armageddon Cup in his possession he reclaimed his job and had the chance to face Dal Knox for the title which Dion McCracken was not happy about. Vinny Dunn presented Dion McCracken with a right hand much to the crowds delight.

At IPW Ground Zero, "The Deal" Dal Knox faced "The Samoan Siverback" in the main event with the IPW Commissioner, Dion McCracken as special guest referee. During the match, it was announced that an enforcer would make sure that McCracken would be fair in calling the match, in which was revealed to be Reuben De Jong. At the end of the match, which saw Dal Knox retain, "Te Tahi" Vinny Dunn interrupted the post-match celebrations to reveal that he would be cashing in his opportunity to face Knox at Nightmare B4 Xmas 2010, stating that he would want Knox fresh and ready and would not "stoop to his level" to take the title off Knox much to the horror of the champion.

At IPW Nightmare B4 Xmas "Te Tahi" Vinny Dunn won the IPW New Zealand Heavyweight Championship of "The Deal" Dal Knox in a Fans Bring The Weapons Match, despite the interference of Tykade and The Five Star Revolution of NZWPW.

==== 2011 ====
At IPW New Year's Bash, Dion McCracken went on a firing spree, (kayfabe) firing Jesse Astro, The Kiwi Express, Joseph Kinkade, Lil T, Miles, The New Zealand Dream, The Waipukurau Warrior, Les West, ring announcer Troy Daniels and referee Matt Wolfe, disbanding Pirates And Ninjas Are Totally Awesome and making the Alita Capri versus Just Plain Evil match a Loser Gets Fired Match. McCracken also put the remaining roster on notice. Just Plain Evil defeated Capri resulting in Capri getting (kayfabe) fired. In the main event, Vinny Dunn defeated Dal Knox by submission to retain the IPW New Zealand Heavyweight Championship. Knox demanded another match against Dunn at IPW Coastal Assault. In response Dunn announced that the match would be a 30-minute Iron Man match.

In May 2011, it was announced that IPW had made a deal with Maori Television to film a new show. The show Mana Mamau was a weekly feature on Maori TV throughout 2011 and into 2012. Within the show's 40-episode run both the IPW Tag Team Championships changed hands as well as the IPW NZ Heavyweight championship.

==== 2012 ====
IPW returned to its roots in 2012 by going back to the live event structure that made it so popular. At the Genesis event in March Dave O'Connor and Dal Knox lost their IPW Tag titles to NEO Justice Double and Brian Saint James won the Eliminator giving him an IPW Championship match whenever he chooses.

===== The Road to Destiny =====
On 19 May 2012, during the live event, IPW Collision Course, in Hamilton, New Zealand, IPW Commissioner Dion McCracken announced a new championship was being commissioned for the growing women's division, sporting a red strap and mirroring the IPW New Zealand Heavyweight Championship he advised a tournament would determine the new Women's champion.

The first match was between Megan Kate and Britenay at IPW Collision Course, which was won by Britinay under dubious circumstances. Collision Course would also prove to be the turning point for then comical 'gangster' duo TNT as they would ambush IPW Tag-Team Champions, NEO Justice Double after they defeated Project Mayhem (NZWPW's Tag-Team Champions, Johnny Idol and IPW's James Shaw) in an inter-promotional champion versus champion match. Lil T and Brother T would hit their patented T Factor on both members of NJ2 before raising the Tag-Team Championships and signaling their intentions. Days later IPW posted a video featuring TNT justifying their actions, saying they 'would no longer be considered jokes' amongst the locker room. This would lead to an unsuccessful challenge to the Tag-Team Championships at IPW Unleashed.

The next match in the women's championship tournament was between Evie and Olivia Shaw (in her debut singles match) at IPW Unleashed in Evie's hometown of Pakuranga, Auckland which resulted in Evie advancing to the finals. However, an appeal by Megan Kate shortly after IPW Collision Course resulted in a re-match being made between Megan Kate and Britenay at IPW Taranaki Turmoil by the Commissioner.

That match was once again won by Britenay after she used the ropes as leverage to gain an advantage and take the pinfall, resulting in Evie vs Britenay for the IPW Women's Championship at IPW Destiny.

On 18 August 2012, after 3 months of tournament matches. Evie and Britenay squared off what was to be expected a strenuous battle between the two stalwarts of the division. However, before the match officially got underway IPW Commissioner Dion McCracken added Megan Kate to the match making the match a triple threat match.

At the end of the bout, and after hitting her trademarked 'TTYL' (Fireman's Carry into Shin Kick) on her tag team partner, Megan Kate. Evie became the first ever IPW Women's Champion, much to the delight of the sold-out audience.

Once again, TNT and NEO Justice would do battle, this time in an 828 Street Fight. It would seem this time the odds were tipped in the challengers favor. But as Link flew over the top rope to put Lil T through a table ringside, Kazuki finished Brother T with a Shiranui through a ladder to once again retain, at Destiny.

On 4 August 2013, former IPW Tag Team Champion Dils O'Conner defeated Masato Tanaka at Pro Wrestling Zero1's Fire Festival Final in Tokyo, Japan. As well as winning the prestigious tournament he also won the vacant World Heavyweight Championship becoming the first New Zealand born world champion in over 30 years.

== Championships ==
=== Current champions ===
| Championship | Current champion(s) | Date won | Event | Previous Champion(s) | Reference |
|---|---|---|---|---|---|
| IPW New Zealand Heavyweight Championship | Horus | 11 July 2026 | Fans Bring the Weapons | JayRilla | |
| IPW Aotearoa New Zealand Tag Team Championships | Generation Iron (Peter Prince & Jacked Maximum) | 18 July 2026 | LIVE In Taranaki | The Wild Hunt (Connor King & Jordan Macallan) | |
| IPW New Zealand Women's Championship | Amber Saint | 30 May 2026 | The Eliminator | Mighty Maia | |
| Warner Cup (formerly Kinkade Cup) | Nico Bell | 18 July 2026 | LIVE In Taranaki | Vacant | |

== Video on demand ==
IPW Ignited is a video on demand series, available to purchase or rent through the Vimeo website. It was also briefly broadcast on CTV. The first episode was released on 16 September 2015.

On 31 July 2019, IPW announced a partnership with sports streaming service FITE TV to air fortnightly episodes. The first episode was released the following month on 23 August.

In 2022, in a partnership with Southern Pro Wrestling, IPW events are available through SPW's on demand streaming service SPW On Demand.

As of 2024, IPW events are available on their YouTube Channel 'IPWNZ On Demand'.

== See also ==
- Professional wrestling in New Zealand
- List of professional wrestling promotions in New Zealand
