= ALT TV =

New Zealand television broadcast

ALT TV was a New Zealand broadcast, privately owned and operated 24-hour live-to-air music TV, which aired from 2006 to 2009 and was seen on SKY Digital channel 065. In March 2009, the company was placed into liquidation and the channel went off-air.

The logo for ALT TV

ALT TV's most recent slogan was 'Know Good Television.' Their previous slogan was 'Actual Music Television.'

Created by Thane Kirby (founder of George FM) and Ricky Newby (creator of music festival Deep Hard 'n Funky), it was launched in Auckland on UHF channel 62 on 14 November 2005. The television station also started screening on SKY Digital Channel 36 on Friday, 1 December 2006, later moving to SKY Digital Channel 65 on 1 March 2007. By early 2009 it was under new management. On 4 March 2009 Sky TV stopped transmitting the channel over its digital satellite (DVB-S) service, replacing it with an image stating that ALT TV is no longer available in Sky Digital. The last song played to air was 'The End' by The Doors. While the Sky feed ceased, the web streams were still operational at this time. On 18 March 2009, a liquidator was appointed and ALT TV placed into liquidation. On 27 March 2009, the liquidators first report stated: "Reason for failure: substantial and consistent trading losses sustained". Finally on 28 March 2009, ALT's website went offline along with the FLV streaming indexers.

ALT TV catered for the alternative demographic which some consider a response to the growing commercialism in other New Zealand Music channels such as C4 and MTV. ALT TV supported niche musical genres as well as alternative rock, indie, old school Rap & hip-hop, heavy metal, blues, Soul, funk, jazz, alt country, punk, hard rock, glam rock, 1980s, house, drum n bass and classic rock.

ALT TV supported New Zealand music and featured a high degree of unsigned and amateur content, including interviews, music videos and features of unsigned local bands. ALT TV was known for its intentionally unprofessional and unpolished style which is a common feature amongst most of their volunteer presenters and crew members. ALT TV would play Music Videos and performances sent in by local bands, thus being a launching ground for talent which would otherwise be ignored by commercial radio.

At last count ALT TV had around 424,000 monthly viewers and around 50 live to air shows, the highest number of live content in New Zealand. In March 2008 they began a search for a confident topless news anchor to host their upcoming Marquis Condoms' Naked News Flash show for 3 months. Lisa Lewis became the eventual host and completed her 3-month contract, however ALT TV and Marquis decided not to renew the show.

== Former show line up ==
| | Monday | Tuesday | Wednesday | Thursday | Friday |
|---|---|---|---|---|---|
| 07:00 | Playlist | Playlist | Playlist | Playlist | Playlist |
| 19:00 | After work drinks | After work drinks | After work drinks | After work drinks | After work drinks |
| 19:30 | The Uncles | The Uncles | The Uncles | The Uncles | The Uncles |
| 20:00 | Petrol Therapy | The Seen | Greencore | ALT-eroa | What the Heck, America |
| 20:30 | Alt-n-about | Alt-n-about | Alt-n-about | BFM TV | Friday nite live |
| 21:00 | Alt-n-about | Alt-n-about | Alt-n-about | Alt-n-about | Alt-n-about |
| 22:30 | Disruptive TV | World Music | Fire it up | Stereo Deluxe | The 80s show |
| 23:30 | The Uncles | The Uncles | The Uncles | The Uncles | The Uncles |
| 24:00 | Overnight Playlist | Overnight Playlist | Overnight Playlist | Overnight Playlist | Overnight Playlist |

| | Saturday | Sunday |
|---|---|---|
| 07:00 | Comedown | Comedown |
| 08:00 | Playlist | Playlist |
| 15:00 | Playlist | IPW wrestling |
| 16:00 | Playlist | Hangover on Sunday with Adrian Drew & Andrew Ferguson |
| 17:00 | Playlist | The Vinyl Monologues |
| 18:00 | Playlist | Sparkle on Sunday |
| 19:00 | Welcome to the Gun Show | Sunday News Roast |
| 20:00 | Rock 101 | Let's be Frank |
| 21:00 | Rockzilla | Cheese on Toast |
| 22:00 | Grunge Lounge | Ashtray Heart |
| 23:00 | Soundbank | playlist |

== Breach of Broadcasting Standards ==
On 6 February 2007 ALT TV broadcast the Groove in the Park musical event, and viewers could send in text messages which were then shown on screen. ALT TV engaged a censor to moderate the text messages before they were broadcast. However, the censor was drunk and failed to perform this role for five hours during the broadcast. As a result, offensive messages with sexual and racial content were broadcast.

The Broadcasting Standards Authority ruled on 10 October 2007 that ALT TV breached broadcasting standards. As punishment BSA ordered the channel to broadcast an apology and a summary of the BSA decision for five hours on 22 October 2007 instead of its regular programming. This was the first time the BSA has made a channel stop broadcasting. The BSA also fined the channel the maximum of $5000.
