= Headlocked (comics) =

Headlocked is a professional wrestling comic book developed by Visionary Comics Studio, that debuted in 2007. It has featured a painted cover painted by Jerry Lawler. The series was created by Michael Kingston with art by Randy Valiente.

== Series ==
- Headlocked: Work of Art
- Headlocked: The Tryout (3 issues)
- Headlocked: A Single Step
- Headlocked: The Last Territory Volume 1
- Headlocked: The Last Territory Volume 2

== Reception ==
The comic received a positive review in Comics Bulletin and according to Comic Book Bin, "The series has garnered praise from Rob Van Dam, Booster Gold writer Jeff Katz, Jonny Fairplay, and Samoa Joe and Shawn Daivari." Kingston was interviewed by Comic Collector Live and Comic News.Info.

== See also ==
- List of wrestling-based comic books
