= Westlake, New Zealand =

Westlake
- Suburb
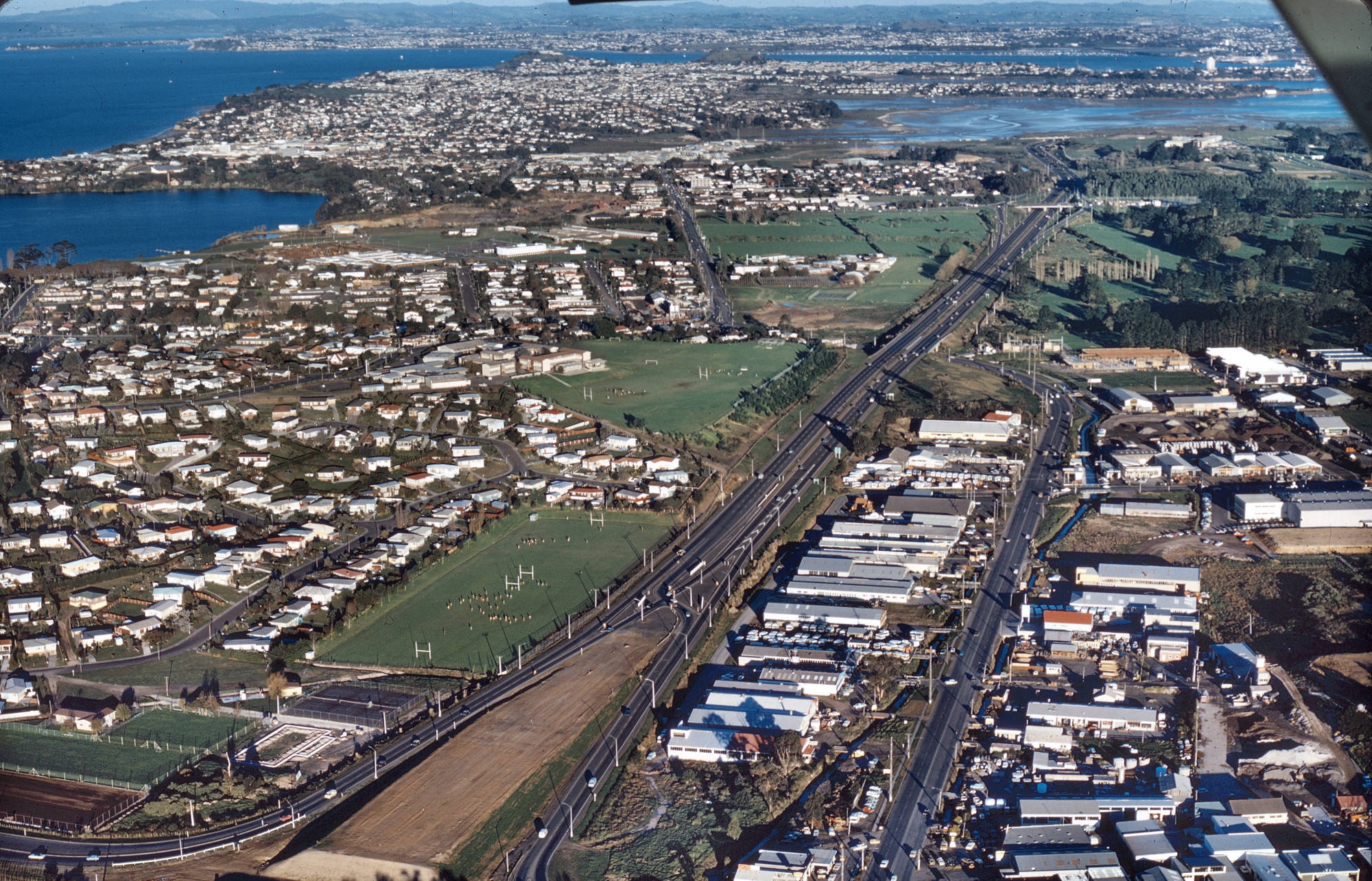
- Aerial view of Westlake in 1975
- Interactive map of Westlake
- Coordinates: 36.777°S 174.754°E
- Country: New Zealand
- City: Auckland
- Local authority: Auckland Council
- Electoral ward: North Shore ward
- Local board: Devonport-Takapuna Local Board

Area
  - Land: 69 ha (170 acres)

Population (June 2025)
  - Total: 3,060
  - Density: 4,400/km^{2} (11,000/sq mi)
- Busway stations: Smales Farm busway station

Wairau Valley	Forrest Hill	Milford
Glenfield	Westlake	Lake Pupuke
Hillcrest	Takapuna	Takapuna

Westlake is a suburb of the North Shore in New Zealand's Auckland urban area. It lies eight kilometres to the northwest of the Auckland CBD between the major suburbs of Milford and Glenfield. The name arises from its position on the western shoreline of Lake Pupuke.

== Demographics ==
Westlake covers 0.69 km^{2} (0.27 sq mi) and had an estimated population of 3,060 as of June 2025, with a population density of 4,435 people per km^{2}.

Historical population
Year	Pop.	±% p.a.
2006	2,523	—
2013	2,796	+1.48%
2018	2,994	+1.38%
2023	2,862	−0.90%

Westlake had a population of 2,862 in the 2023 New Zealand census, a decrease of 132 people (−4.4%) since the 2018 census, and an increase of 66 people (2.4%) since the 2013 census. There were 1,335 males, 1,521 females and 6 people of other genders in 1,002 dwellings. 2.7% of people identified as LGBTIQ+. The median age was 39.4 years (compared with 38.1 years nationally). There were 498 people (17.4%) aged under 15 years, 495 (17.3%) aged 15 to 29, 1,353 (47.3%) aged 30 to 64, and 516 (18.0%) aged 65 or older.

People could identify as more than one ethnicity. The results were 49.7% European (Pākehā); 4.6% Māori; 2.1% Pasifika; 45.8% Asian; 3.2% Middle Eastern, Latin American and African New Zealanders (MELAA); and 1.6% other, which includes people giving their ethnicity as "New Zealander". English was spoken by 91.5%, Māori language by 0.5%, Samoan by 0.3%, and other languages by 40.5%. No language could be spoken by 2.0% (e.g. too young to talk). New Zealand Sign Language was known by 0.1%. The percentage of people born overseas was 53.4, compared with 28.8% nationally.

Religious affiliations were 36.9% Christian, 2.2% Hindu, 1.9% Islam, 1.7% Buddhist, 0.2% New Age, 0.5% Jewish, and 1.3% other religions. People who answered that they had no religion were 50.3%, and 5.0% of people did not answer the census question.

Of those at least 15 years old, 972 (41.1%) people had a bachelor's or higher degree, 852 (36.0%) had a post-high school certificate or diploma, and 540 (22.8%) people exclusively held high school qualifications. The median income was $46,300, compared with $41,500 nationally. 372 people (15.7%) earned over $100,000 compared to 12.1% nationally. The employment status of those at least 15 was that 1,194 (50.5%) people were employed full-time, 294 (12.4%) were part-time, and 39 (1.6%) were unemployed.

== Education ==
Westlake Boys High School and Westlake Girls High School are single-sex secondary (years 9-13) private schools with rolls of 2,773 and 2,289 respectively, as of July 2026.

Westlake High School, which opened in 1958, became Westlake Girls High School in 1962 after Westlake Boys High School opened.
