= New Zealand Wide Pro Wrestling =

New Zealand professional wrestling promotion

- Acronym: NZWPW
- Founded: 2003
- Founder: Martin Stirling
- Formerly: Wellington Pro Wrestling
- Website: nzwpw.com

New Zealand Wide Pro Wrestling (NZWPW) is a professional wrestling promotion based in Petone and later Wainuiomata in New Zealand. The promotion entered a hiatus in 2018, when former NZWPW wrestler, Jay Marshall left the promotion to start Capital Pro Wrestling. Since 2020, professional wrestling and training in Wainuiomata is now run by former NZWPW wrestler, Hayden Thiele with his Valiant Pro promotion. This promotion has many former wrestlers from NZWPW such as Axl Stirling, "Rufguts" Roddy Gunn, Chad Howard and Jade Priest.

== History ==
=== Formation ===
NZWPW logo used from 2005 to 2013

NZWPW was formed in October 2003 by martial arts trainer, former New Zealand Sumo Wrestling champion and head of Petone's He Toa Sports Association, Martin Stirling. Stirling noticed a new generation of wrestling fans, brought up on WWF action. With a wrestling ring already set up at his He Toa gym, Stirling sent an invitation for prospective Wrestlers. Four men answered the call, X-Rated, Juice, Inferno and D-Hoya, with these four pioneers, NZWPW was born. Wrestlers trained by Stirling first performed at the Armageddon Convention on 20 September 2003, as part of an Impact Pro Wrestling show, and the promotion was launched under the name Wellington Pro Wrestling (WPW). WPW's first show was held on 14 November 2003 in Petone. Throughout 2004, more wrestlers joined and small shows were held at community venues around the Hutt Valley. Soon, Stirling, was inundated with prospective wrestlers and had to hold training weekends to find the best talent.

WPW then got re-branded to New Zealand Wide Pro Wrestling in January 2005. This was partly because the domain name for WPW was already used and to reflect the growing interest in touring New Zealand (Christchurch, Masterton, Levin, Gisborne, Hastings and Auckland) as well as the Wellington area. By May 2005, NZWPW had a presence on the internet and thirty five active wrestlers. On 25 March 2005 NZWPW held the Powerplay 2 event at the Lower Hutt Town Hall with over 300 fans in attendance

=== Expansion ===
NZWPW performed shows in Christchurch, Palmerston North, Porirua, Ōtaki, Levin, Paraparaumu, Blenheim and many others major centres up and down the country making it the most widely touring New Zealand promotion and the only one to perform regularly in both New Zealand's North Island and South Island. Wrestlers from NZWPW have also wrestled for Australian promotion Impact Pro Wrestling Australia (formerly Major Impact Wrestling). Female wrestler Misty also competed in the all women's Australian promotion PWWA.

In May 2006 a number of NZWPW wrestlers, led by former NZWPW booker The Punisher and WCW/NWA star Rip Morgan, left to set up a rival promotion called Kiwi Pro Wrestling. Since then NZWPW has had an on-again-off-again working relationship with Auckland-based promotion Impact Pro Wrestling. In 2008 NZWPW featured on the television show 'Good Morning' which is a nationally seen show on TV One to promote Powerplay V with all profits being donated to the Te Omanga Hospice. It continued on its charity work in 2009 when it ran a show to raise funds for the Movember foundation. NZWPW also co-promoted a show with the Australasian Wrestling Federation featuring Raven. In 2009 Chris Masters featured at Powerplay VI, making numerous television appearances to promote the event including 'Good Morning' and '20/20'.

== Martial arts ==
Thanks to Martin Stirling's martial arts background, NZWPW made much of its links with New Zealand's martial arts scene. Many of their early shows featured demonstrations of fighting styles such as karate and kickboxing. Shows have also been co-promoted with major Sumo events such as the 2005 Oceania Sumo Championships and the 2006 New Zealand Open Sumo Championships.

Also in 2006, NZWPW co-sponsored sumo wrestlers Sio Sakaria and Mark Tanu to attend the Junior World Championships in Estonia, where they won silver and bronze medals respectively.

In 2009 NZWPW wrestlers Travis Banks and Tykade both won gold medals at the Oceania Sumo championships in Australia.

This was backed up in 2010 when numerous NZWPW wrestlers took part in the Oceania Sumo Championships (this time held in Lower Hutt, Wellington, New Zealand). With Tykade once again taking out the open and heavyweight divisions, Rufguts and Ben Mana were also in the medals in the heavyweight and open divisions.

Travis Banks, Tykade and Rufguts went on to compete at the World Combat Games in China in August 2010.

== Triangle TV ==
=== Invasion ===
New Zealand Wide Pro Wrestling Invasion previously aired on Triangle TV & Stratos. The show debuted on 21 August 2008 at 11pm. Invasion includes touring of NZWPW and was officially kicked off on 16 August in Wainuiomata and occasionally, Upper Hutt. The show ended prior to the New Year of 2009.

== Championships ==
=== Current Champions ===
Championship	Champion(s)	Date won	Days held	Location	Event	Previous Champion
NZWPW Heavyweight Championship	Bryant	14 September 2018	2,960	Epuni	Friday Night Live Pro Wrestling	Wayne La Perfeccion
NZWPW Tag Team Championship	The Wainui Express (Hayden and Jade Priest)	20 July 2018	3,016	Epuni	Friday Night Live Pro Wrestling	Vacant
He Toa Cup	"The Spartan" Sam Black	15 June 2018	3,051	Epuni	Friday Night Live Pro Wrestling	Cam Owens The Third

=== NZWPW Heavyweight Championship ===
The NZWPW Heavyweight Championship is the top professional wrestling championship title in the New Zealand promotion New Zealand Wide Pro Wrestling (NZWPW). It was the original super heavyweight title of Wellington Pro Wrestling and introduced as the WPW Super Heavyweight Championship on 3 December 2004. The inaugural champion was Ruamoko, who defeated Les Barrett in a tournament final in Lower Hutt, New Zealand, on 25 April 1992. The title became vacant when Ruamoko suffered an injury in early-2005 and, after the promotion became New Zealand Wide Pro Wrestling, it was replaced by the current heavyweight championship first won by Island Boy Si on 25 March 2005.

=== NZWPW Tag Team Championship ===
The NZWPW Tag Team Championship is the top professional wrestling tag team championship title in the New Zealand promotion New Zealand Wide Pro Wrestling. The title was first won by The Superlatives (Jean Miracle and Nick Silver), who won a tournament final at Power Play IV in Lower Hutt, New Zealand to win the titles on 14 April 2007. It was the first title of its kind to be established by a major promotion since the NWA Australasian Tag Team Championship during the early 1980s and was the oldest active tag team championship in New Zealand.

=== He Toa Cup ===
He Toa Cup
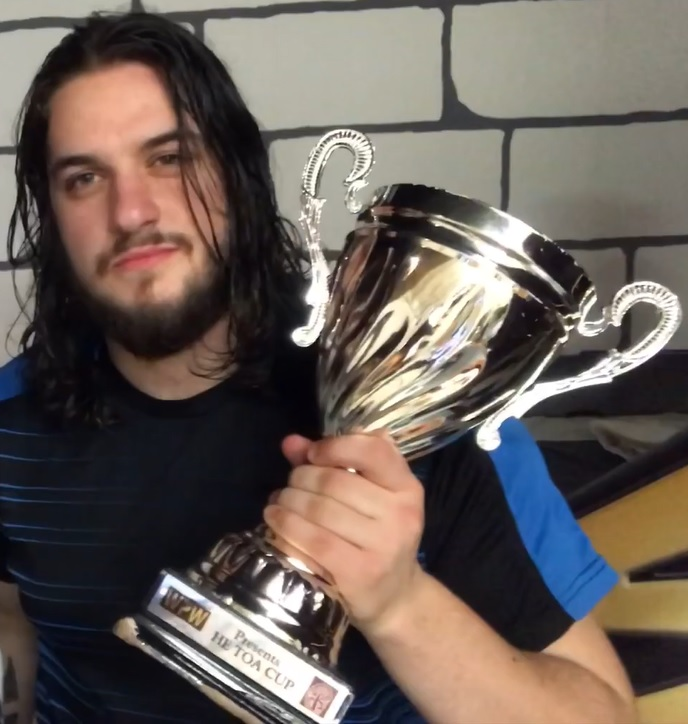
- The final He Toa Cup holder, "The Spartan" Sam Black

Details
- Promotion: New Zealand Wide Pro Wrestling
- Date established: 10 December 2011
- Current champion: "The Spartan" Sam Black
Statistics
- First champion: Ben Mana
- Most reigns: Chad Howard & Axl (2)
- Longest reign: "The Spartan" Sam Black 3,051 days)
- Shortest reign: Dream Catcher (35 days)

The He Toa Cup is the secondary singles professional wrestling championship in the New Zealand promotion New Zealand Wide Pro Wrestling. The cup was first won by Ben Mana on 10 December 2011 in Petone, New Zealand. From 2011 – 2013, the cup was defended at every NZWPW show held in the He Toa Gym in Petone.

==== Title history ====
Key
No.	Overall reign number
Reign	Reign number for the specific champion
Days	Number of days held

No.	Champion	Championship change			Reign statistics		Notes	Ref.
No.	Champion	Date	Event	Location	Reign	Days	Notes	Ref.
1	Ben Mana	10 December 2011	Final Countdown (2011)	Petone	1	120	Ben Mana became the first He Toa Cup champion	
2	Jakob Cross	8 April 2012	Bringing Down The House	Petone	1	257		
3	JC Star	21 December 2012	Bringing Down The House	Petone	1	98		
4	Dream Catcher	29 March 2013	Bringing Down The House	Petone	1	35		
5	Chad Howard	3 May 2013	Bringing Down The House	Petone	1	168		
—	Vacated	N/A	Right 2 Challenge (2013)	Ōtaki	—	—	Chad Howard exchanged the cup for a match against Ben Mana for the NZWPW Championship	
6	Mikey	28 February 2014	Bringing Down The House	Petone	1	119		
7	Mr Silver	27 June 2014	Beat Down (2014)	Petone	1	85		
8	Axl	20 September 2014	Road to Rescue (2014)	Waikanae	1	167	Axl defeated Mr Silver in a Loser Wears a Dress match	
9	Chad Howard	6 March 2015	Bringing Down The House – End of an Era	Petone	2	204	Chad Howard won a He Toa Cup Rumble	
10	Jade Priest	26 September 2015	Live Pro Wrestling – Featuring A Cosplay Contest	Wainuiomata	1	181		
11	Axl	25 March 2016	NZWPW Returns To Masterton	Masterton	2	595		
12	Kartik	10 November 2017	Powerplay 2017	Epuni	1	140	Kartik won a Battle Royale for the He Toa Cup	
13	Cam Owens The Third	30 March 2018	Friday Night Live Pro Wrestling	Ngaio	1	77	Cam Owens The Third won a Royal Rumble Match for the He Toa Cup	
14	"The Spartan" Sam Black	15 June 2018	Friday Night Live Pro Wrestling	Epuni	1	3,051		

===== List of combined reigns =====
Rank	Champion	No. of reigns	Combined days
1	"The Spartan" Sam Black	1	3,051
2	Axl	2	762
3	Chad Howard	2	372
4	Jakob Cross	1	257
5	Jade Priest	1	181
6	Kartik	1	140
7	Ben Mana	1	120
8	Mikey	1	119
9	JC Star	1	98
10	Mr Silver	1	85
11	Cam Owens The Third	1	77
12	Dream Catcher	1	35

== Powerplay history ==
Powerplay was NZWPW's biggest and longest running event. A Powerplay event had been held almost every year of the promotion's existence.

=== Powerplay (2004) ===
Powerplay (2004)
- Promotion: WPW
- Date: 25 June 2004
- City: Petone, New Zealand
- Venue: Petone Central School
- Tagline: Showtime

Powerplay chronology
← Previous; First	Next → Powerplay II

No.	Results	Stipulations
1	Les "The Slammer" Barrett defeated Chrome	Singles match
2	H-Flame defeated "Silencer" Jean Miracle	Singles match
3	The Ram defeated Creed by disqualification	Singles match
4	Gold & Dal Knox defeated Inferno & Jonnie Juice	Tag team match
5	X-Rated defeated D-Hoya (c)	Singles match for the WPW Catchweight Championship
6	Jonnie Juice defeated Les "The Slammer" Barrett, Blade, Chrome, Creed, D-Hoya, AJ Freely, Gold, H-Flame, Inferno, Dal Knox, "Silencer" Jean Miracle & The Ram	13-man Crusade match
(c) / – the champion(s) heading into the match

=== Powerplay II ===
Powerplay II
- Promotion: NZWPW
- Date: 25 March 2005
- City: Lower Hutt, New Zealand
- Venue: Lower Hutt Town Hall

Powerplay chronology
← Previous; Powerplay (2004)	Next → Powerplay III

No.	Results	Stipulations
1	The Ram defeated "The Hype" Bobby Cool	Singles match
2	X-Rated defeated Dan "The Man" Stirling	Singles match
3	Island Boy Si defeated Max "The Axe" Damage	NZWPW New Zealand Heavyweight Championship Tournament Semi-Final
4	Ivan Dragunov vs. The Rookie ended in a draw	Singles match
5	The Punisher defeated Harvey Dollars	NZWPW New Zealand Heavyweight Championship Tournament Semi-Final
6	Inferno & H-Flame defeated Jonnie Juice & "Silencer" Jean Miracle	Tag team match
7	D-Hoya (c) defeated NOS	Singles match for the NZWPW Catchweight Championship
8	Island Boy Si defeated The Punisher	NZWPW New Zealand Heavyweight Championship Tournament Final
(c) / – the champion(s) heading into the match

=== Powerplay III ===
Powerplay III
- Promotion: NZWPW
- Date: 14 April 2006
- City: Lower Hutt, New Zealand
- Venue: Lower Hutt Town Hall

Powerplay chronology
← Previous; Powerplay II	Next → Powerplay IV

No.	Results	Stipulations
1	"Shining" Nick Silver vs. Dan Stirling ended in a draw	Singles match
2	Chrome defeated Anarchy	Singles match
3	Adam Avalanche defeated CD & Jimmy Sparx	Triple threat match
4	The Ram defeated Inferno	Singles match to determine the Number 1 Contender to the NZWPW New Zealand Championship
5	TNT defeated Angel of Destruction	Singles match
6	D-Hoya defeated Jonnie Juice (c)	Singles match for the NZWPW New Zealand Championship
7	"Silencer" Jean Miracle & Max Damage defeated H-Flame & NOS	Tag team match
(c) / – the champion(s) heading into the match

=== Powerplay 6 ===
Powerplay 6
- Promotion: NZWPW
- Date: 23 April 2009
- City: Taita, New Zealand
- Venue: Walter Nash Stadium

Powerplay chronology
← Previous; Powerplay V	Next → Powerplay VII

No.	Results	Stipulations
1	El Montana defeated Axl	Singles match
2	The Nerd defeated Travis Banks	Singles match
3	MacBeth & Misty defeated Carmella Caprice & Matariki	Tag team match
4	Ben Mana & Tykade defeated The Circus of Tragedy (Osiris & Phil Woodgate) (c)	Tag team match for the NZWPW Tag Team Championship
5	CD defeated Dan Stirling	Singles match
6	D-Hoya (c) defeated JC Star	Singles match for the NZWPW Heavyweight Championship
7	Chris Masters defeated Adam Avalanche and Rufguts	Triple threat match
(c) / – the champion(s) heading into the match

=== Powerplay VII ===
Powerplay VII
- Promotion: WPW
- Date: 19 June 2010
- City: Lower Hutt, New Zealand
- Venue: Lower Hutt Town Hall

Powerplay chronology
← Previous; Powerplay 6	Next → Powerplay VIII

No.	Results	Stipulations
1	G.I. Jay defeated Fred The Great	Singles match
2	Thor defeated Axl, Mikey Rave & The Nerd	Four way match
3	Red Dragon defeated Kid Mystique	Singles match
4	"Shining" Nick Silver defeated Travis Banks	Lance Storm Tournament Final
5	Corey Dallas vs. JC Star ended in a draw	Singles match
6	Jon E. King & "The One" Vinny Dunn defeated Corey Dallas & JC Star	Tag team match
7	Ben Mana defeated Adam Avalanche	Singles match
8	Chi-Tah defeated Misty, Carmella Caprice & Stella Hammer	Four way match
9	Chad Howard defeated Johnny Idol	Hair vs. Mask Match
10	Tykade defeated Rufguts (c)	Singles match for the NZWPW New Zealand Championship
(c) / – the champion(s) heading into the match

=== Powerplay XI ===
Powerplay XI
- Promotion: NZWPW
- Date: 15 November 2014
- City: Levin, New Zealand
- Venue: Levin Memorial Hall
- Tagline: A Battle for the Heart And Soul of NZWPW

Powerplay chronology
← Previous; Powerplay X	Next → Powerplay 2017

No.	Results	Stipulations
1	The Wainui Express (c) defeated Rodeo Drive	Tag team match for the NZWPW Tag Team Championship
2	"The Standard Hero" Graham Hughes defeated Kade Morgan 3G	Singles match
3	Franke Quinn defeated Scarlett (c)	Singles match for the KPW Women's Championship
4	Charlie Roberts defeated Shane Sinclair	Singles match. Hughes Academy Champion vs. KPW Champion
5	Misty (c) defeated Krystal Kayne	Singles match for the Hughes Academy Women's Championship
6	Team Warriors (Ben Mana, Paul Sayers, Hayden Thiele, Jade Priest & Mr. Silver defeated Team Nobodies Drive (Bryant, Chad Howard, Axl, XXX-Rated & "Dreamcatcher" Phil Woodgate)	5 on 5 elimination tag team match
(c) / – the champion(s) heading into the match

==== 5 on 5 Elimination Tag Team match ====
Elimination	Wrestler	Eliminated by
1	Bryant	Disqualification
2	Ben Mana	Countout
2	Axl	Countout
3	Mr. Silver	Pinfall
4	Jade Priest	Pinfall
5	Hayden Thiele	Pinfall
6	Chad Howard	Pinfall
6	XXX-Rated	Pinfall
6	"Dreamcatcher" Phil Woodgate	Submission
Survivor(s):	Paul Sayers	

=== Powerplay 2017 ===
Powerplay 2017
- Promotion: NZWPW
- Date: 10 November 2017
- City: Epuni, New Zealand
- Venue: Epuni Community Hall

Powerplay chronology
← Previous; Powerplay XI	Next → TBA

No.	Results	Stipulations
1	Cam Owens the Third defeated Sam Black	Singles match
2	Shane Sinclair defeated "Rufguts" Roddy Gunn via Disqualification	Stirling Rules match
3	Wayne la Perfeccion defeated Paul Sayers	Singles match
4	Katrik defeated Bryant, Misty, Umlaut, Jay Marshal, Axl (c), Robbo "The Aussie Dreamboat" Smith, and "The Standard Hero" Graham Hughes	Battle Royale for the He Toa Cup
5	Jade Priest defeated "Thunderbird" Daniel Martins	Singles match
6	Charlie Roberts defeated Chad Howard (c)	Singles match for the NZWPW Heavyweight Championship
7	Axl defeated Charlie Roberts (c)	Singles match for the NZWPW Heavyweight Championship
(c) / – the champion(s) heading into the match

== See also ==
- Professional wrestling in New Zealand
- List of professional wrestling promotions in New Zealand
