= NWA World Junior Heavyweight Championship (Iowa version) =

1940s professional wrestling

The Iowa version of the NWA World Junior Heavyweight Championship was a professional wrestling championship that was promoted by the Iowa-based National Wrestling Alliance (NWA) promotion between 1943 and 1949. The championship was competed for by junior heavyweight wrestlers. The inaugural champion was Ken Fenelon, who was awarded the title in May 1943.

Both the championship and the promotion predate the more famous National Wrestling Alliance (NWA) that was founded in May 1948 as a governing body and interpromotional alliance of wrestling promotions in the midwestern United States. Both the Iowa-based NWA promotion and the NWA governing body were founded by Paul "Pinkie" George. At the founding meeting of the NWA governing body, Billy Goelz, George's reigning World Junior Heavyweight Champion in Iowa, was recognized as the world champion of the new alliance. As a result, the Iowa-based championship was retired and replaced with the main NWA title. Goelz lost recognition from the NWA in November 1949, with Leroy McGuirk, world champion of the National Wrestling Association, being selected as the new champion. Goelz, however, continued to be recognized as champion in Iowa. On December 28, 1949, McGuirk defeated Goelz to unify the Iowa championship into his world championship. The NWA recognizes holders of the Iowa version of the NWA World Junior Heavyweight Championship as former champions of the main NWA title.

== Title history ==
Reign	The reign number for the specific champion listed
Location	The city in which the title was won
Event	The event promoted by the respective promotion in which the title was won
†	Indicates the title changes not recognized by the NWA
+	Indicates the current reign is changing daily

No.	Wrestler	Times	Date	Days held	Location	Event	Notes	Ref.
1	Ken Fenelon	1	May 1943	N/A	N/A	N/A	Fenelon was awarded the title by Paul "Pinkie" George, the founder of the NWA.	
2	Marshall Esteppe	1	May 30, 1945	216	Toronto, IA	House show		
3	Larry Tillman	1	January 1, 1946	69	Des Moines, IA	House show		
4	Ken Fenelon	2	March 11, 1946	301	Des Moines, IA	House show		
5	Marshall Esteppe	2	January 6, 1947	77	Des Moines, IA	House show		
6	Ray Steele	1	March 24, 1947	35	Des Moines, IA	House show		
7	Marshall Esteppe	3	April 28, 1947	77	Des Moines, IA	House show		
8	Billy Goelz	1	March 16, 1948	159	Des Moines, IA	House show	The National Wrestling Alliance (NWA) governing body was founded on July 14, 1948. At the founding meeting of the NWA in Waterloo, Iowa, Goelz was recognized as the governing body's World Junior Heavyweight champion. The governing body additionally retroactively recognized all previous holders of the Iowa championship as former NWA World Junior Heavyweight champions.	
9	Al Williams	1	August 22, 1948	14	Waterloo, IA	House show		
10	Billy Goelz	2	September 5, 1948	479	Waterloo, IA	House show		
The NWA withdraws its recognition of Billy Goelz on November 25, 1949, with Leroy McGuirk, world champion of the National Wrestling Association, being selected as the new champion. The championship was retired on December 28, 1949 after McGuirk defeats Goelz, with the lineage continuing over to the new version of the NWA World Junior Heavyweight Championship.

== See also ==
- List of National Wrestling Alliance championships
