= Octavio Gaona =

Mexican professional wrestler

Personal information
- Born: March 22, 1902 León, Guanajuato, Mexico
- Died: June 26, 1996 (aged 94)

Professional wrestling career
- Ring name: Octavio Gaona
- Billed height: 1.73 m (5 ft 8 in)
- Billed weight: 89 kg (196 lb)
- Debut: October 1934
- Retired: 1977

Octavio Gaona (1902–1996) was a Mexican professional wrestler, known for his participation in the first ever high profile Lucha de Apuesta, or wager fight, against Murciélago Velázquez. Gaona held both the Mexican National Middleweight Championship and the Mexican version of the World Middleweight Championship. Gaona's son, adopted son, grandson and great grandson have all been or are all professional wrestlers.

== Professional wrestling career ==
Octavio Gaona made his professional wrestling debut in 1934, wrestling for various small promoters in Guanajuato and surrounding states. By 1937, Gaona wrestled full-time for Salvador Lutteroth's Empresa Mexicana de Lucha Libre (EMLL). On February 6, 1937, Gaona defeated Black Guzmán to win the vacant Mexican National Middleweight Championship. Gaona held the title until September 2, 1938, where Firpo Segra won it but would regain it on January 1, 1939. Gaona's second reign ended just over a month later on February 9, 1939. The loss was not a step down however, as he defeated Gus Kallio to win both the National Wrestling Association World Middleweight Champion and the Mexican version of the World Middleweight Championship. Gaona's title win helped establish the World Middleweight title in Mexico. Gaona unified both titles, only defending them together. On February 4, 1940, Gaona lost the Championships to Tarzán López.

Shortly after the title loss, Octavio Gaona took part in one of the most pivotal events in Mexican professional wrestling history as he took part of the very first Lucha de Apuesta match. After a long buildup of a storyline between Gaona and Murciélago Velázquez, one of the top Rudos ("Bad guy" or Heel character) of the time, Gaona challenged Velázquez to face him in a match where the masked wrestler would "bet" his mask on the outcome of the match. Since Velázquez was so much lighter than Gaona he requested a further condition before he would sign the contract: Octavio Gaona would have to put his hair on the line as well, creating the first match in Mexico where a two wrestlers "bet" either their hair or their mask. On July 14, 1940, Octavio Gaona defeated Murciélago Velázquez, forcing him to unmask after the match in what would become a Lucha Libre tradition. Since then Apuesta matches have become headliners all over Mexico; winning the mask of an opponent is seen as prestigious, and the more famous the masked man is, the bigger the victory. In 1942 Velázquez would get his revenge on Gaona when he defeated him to win the vacant Mexican National Middleweight Championship, although the victory could never equal the loss of the mask.

== Later career and family ==
By the end of the 1940s, Gaona's wrestling career had slowed down, especially with the birth of his son Octavio Gaona, Jr. Gaona, Jr. would go on to become a professional wrestler, as would his son Arturo Gaona and Arturo's son Arturo Gaona, Jr. making the Gaona family a four generation wrestling family. Octavio Gaona also adopted Francisco Ruiz Arreola, who would wrestle under the name "Tamba", nicknamed "the Flying Elephant". Gaona came out of retirement in 1972, at 70 years old, defeating Tamba in a Lucha de Apuesta match to unmask him.

Octavio Gaona died in 1996.

== Championships and accomplishments ==
- Empresa Mexicana de Lucha Libre
  - Mexican National Middleweight Championship (2 times)
  - NWA World Middleweight Championship (1 time)
- National Wrestling Association
  - World Middleweight Champion (1 time)

== Luchas de Apuestas record ==
Winner (wager)	Loser (wager)	Location	Event	Date	Notes
Octavio Gaona (hair)	Murciélago Velázquez (mask)	Mexico City	EMLL Live event	July 18, 1940	
Octavio Gaona (hair)	Chale Romero (hair)	Mexico City	Live event	July 1964	
Octavio Gaona (hair)	Tamba (mask)	Mexico City	Live event	1972	
