= Red Osborn =

American professional wrestler

Personal information
- Born: James Osborn Wichita, Kansas, United States

Professional wrestling career
- Ring name(s): Red Osborn; Jim Osborn; Dr. X Double X Paddy Osborn
- Billed weight: 238 lb (108 kg)

James "Jim" Osborn (born Wichita, Kansas, United States) also known as Red Osborn, Double X and Dr. X is an American retired professional wrestler who was active throughout the United States and Japan in the 1960s and '70s. He wrestled primarily in the National Wrestling Alliance and the American Wrestling Association and is a former NWA World Junior Heavyweight Champion.

== Professional wrestling career ==
Jim Osborn began wrestling in the early 1960s under the ring name Paddy Osborne for Gulas Wrestling Enterprises and the NWA Tri-State territory. He switched to his real name in 1963 and spent his rookie years competing primarily for NWA Tri-State, "Wrestling Promotions, Inc." in Arizona, the Gulf Athletic Club in Houston. From there, he worked San Francisco, Arizona and Los Angeles and Georgia Championship as "Red Osborn". On August 10, 1967, Osborn and Johnny Kostas captured the NWA Pacific Northwest Tag Team Championship in the Pacific Northwest territory. During this time, Osborne also wrestled in Vince J. McMahon's World Wide Wrestling Federation. There, he competed against Pat Patterson in San Francisco on August 12, 1967 in Patterson’s first bout for the WWWF.

The following year, 1968, on July 17, Osborn defeated Mil Mascaras on July 17 for LA's NWA Hollywood territory before heading to the American Wrestling Association. Still competing under his real name, he had notable rivalries with Bob Mulligan and Billy Red Lyons before "leaving" the promotion.

Osborn's absence from the AWA was pre-planned. He returned later the same year in 1970 and teamed with Dr. X (Dick Beyer; perhaps the most hated heel in the AWA's history) as "Double X". It was an open secret that Double X was indeed Red Osborn and the pair competed as a tag team, using their similar appearances and masked identities to their advantage during matches. On July 18 in St. Paul, Double X was "unmasked" by AWA's original masked wrestler; Mr. M (Bill Miller).

In 1972 Beyer left for a wrestling tour of Japan and Osborn left the Minnesota territory and went to work for Leroy McGuirk and Tri-State in Oklahoma using the ring name "Dr. X". As Dr. X, Osborn was introduced in Tri-State as a masked man sitting ringside during a televised event who eventually interfered in the aid of the heel wrestlers.

Osborn made the Dr. X persona his own and became perhaps the most successful masked heel the McGuirk territory had seen . He defeated Ramón Torres (wrestler) in December 1971 to win the NWA World Junior Heavyweight Championship and soon thereafter entered a programme with Danny Hodge, with the two engaging in a series of stiff matches. The rivalry culminated with Hodge capture the Junior Heavyweight title in Shreveport.

In January 1973, Osborn traveled to Japan to compete for the Japan Pro Wrestling Alliance (JWA) as Dr. X. He had previously competed in Japan in 1970, headlining bouts with Antonio Inoki under his real name. He would compete primarily with Billy Red Lyons. He returned to the Oklahoma territory in 1977, having notable rivalries with Dick Murdoch and Bill Watts. During this tenure in the late 1970s, Osborn (as Dr. X) competed as a fan favourite and went on to win the NWA United States Tag Team Championship with Porkchop Cash, Ciclón Negro and The Brute respectively.

== Championships and accomplishments ==
- International Championship Wrestling(Mississippi)
  - ICW Mississippi Heavyweight Championship(1 time)
- Gulf Coast Championship Wrestling
  - Gulf Coast Heavyweight Championship(1 time)
- National Wrestling Alliance
  - NWA World Junior Heavyweight Championship
- NWA Tri-State
  - NWA United States Tag Team Championship (Tri-State version) (four times)
- Pacific Northwest Wrestling
  - NWA Pacific Northwest Tag Team Championship
