= NWA World Junior Heavyweight Championship =

Professional wrestling championship

- The NWA World Junior Heavyweight Championship belt (2022–present)

Details
- Promotion: National Wrestling Alliance
- Date established: May 1943
- Current champion: Hayden Backlund
- Date won: July 25, 2026 (aired August 29, 2026)
Statistics
- First champion: Ken Fenelon
- Most reigns: Danny Hodge (7 times)
- Longest reign: Danny Hodge (1,450 days)
- Shortest reign: <1 day: Fred Blassie; Hiro Saito

The NWA World Junior Heavyweight Championship is a professional wrestling world championship in the National Wrestling Alliance (NWA). Created in 1943, the title is competed for by junior heavyweight wrestlers.

== History ==
The first NWA World Junior Heavyweight Champion was Ken Fenelon, who was awarded the title in May 1943 by Paul "Pinkie" George, the promoter of the local National Wrestling Alliance (NWA) promotion. For the first few years of its existence, the title was contested largely in Iowa, where George's NWA promotion was based. On July 14, 1948, the NWA was established by George and his partners as a governing body for various regional wrestling promotions in the United States, after which the World Junior Heavyweight Championship became the property of the alliance. At the founding meeting of the NWA governing body in Waterloo, Iowa, Billy Goelz was recognized as the governing body's World Junior Heavyweight Champion; the governing body additionally retroactively recognized all previous holders of the Iowa championship as former NWA World Junior Heavyweight champions.

Between 1948 and 1952, the title was unified with other junior heavyweight titles. After becoming NWA champion in November 1949, Leroy McGuirk, who also held the National Wrestling Association's World Junior Heavyweight Championship, defeated Iowa Champion Billy Goelz to unify the two titles. McGuirk vacated the title in February 1950 after being blinded in a car accident, forcing him to retire. Verne Gagne won the vacant title in November 1950, defeating Sonny Myers in the finals of a tournament, after which he was presented with the title belt by McGuirk. Gagne lost the title to Danny McShain one year later in November 1951. In May 1952, McShain unified the NWA World Junior Heavyweight Championship with the Los Angeles version of the World Junior Heavyweight Championship by defeating Rito Romero.

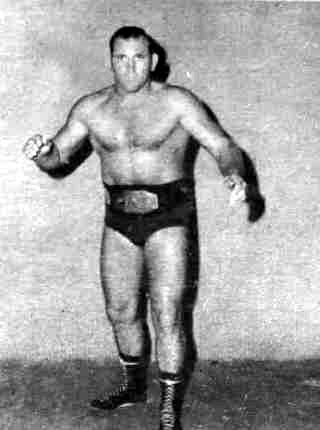
Danny Hodge (pictured in June 1972 during his sixth reign) held the NWA World Junior Heavyweight Championship a record seven times.

In 1960, Danny Hodge had a heated feud with Angelo Savoldi over the NWA World Junior Heavyweight Championship. During a bout between the two men on May 27, 1960 in Oklahoma City, Oklahoma, Hodge's father Bill Hodge Sr. entered the ring and legitimately stabbed Savoldi.

In 1973, Wrestling Pro of the Gulf Coast Championship Wrestling (GCCW) promotion faced Ken Mantell for the championship. During the match, the referee was knocked out and Wrestling Pro won the match, but a second referee appeared and awarded the victory to Mantell. The promoter Bob Kelly declared Wrestling Pro as the new champion and awarded him a title belt. However, Wrestling Pro was recognized as champion only in the GCCW territory and did not receive universal recognition from the NWA. 49 days after his initial loss, Mantell defeated Wrestling Pro to claim both versions of the title.

In March 1976, Hodge vacated the title after being injured in a car accident, marking the end of his record seventh reign as champion.

In December 1979, after the title was vacated, Steve Keirn defeated Chavo Guerrero in the finals of a tournament to win the title. However, Keirn was recognized as champion by New Japan Pro-Wrestling (NJPW), as well as the Los Angeles and Florida NWA territories, but not by the NWA as a whole. The title Keirn held was later renamed the NWA International Junior Heavyweight Championship.

In 1983, the title had splintered into two different lineages. The NWA recognized champion was The Cobra, who worked for NJPW. The Cobra held the title from November 3, 1983 until July 28, 1985, when he lost it against Hiro Saito. However, he regained the title that same day. The Cobra's second reign as champion continued until August 1, 1985, when NJPW separated from the NWA. During the course of The Cobra's reigns, Les Thornton was recognized as champion by Georgia Championship Wrestling. The Georgia title was vacated when Thornton joined the NWA's rival the World Wrestling Federation (WWF). Following Thornton's move to the WWF, Jim Crockett Promotions (JCP) awarded the title to Hector Guerrero on July 13, 1984, with JCP claiming that Guerrero had won a tournament for the championship in Los Angeles, California. Guerrero later lost the championship in a match against Mike Davis and, at Starrcade '84, Davis lost the title to Denny Brown. When NJPW separated from the NWA in August 1985, NWA vice president Shohei Baba recognized Brown as the official champion. In May 1988, champion Nelson Royal left JCP while holding the title, after which the championship began being defended in independent promotions until it was abandoned in December 1989.

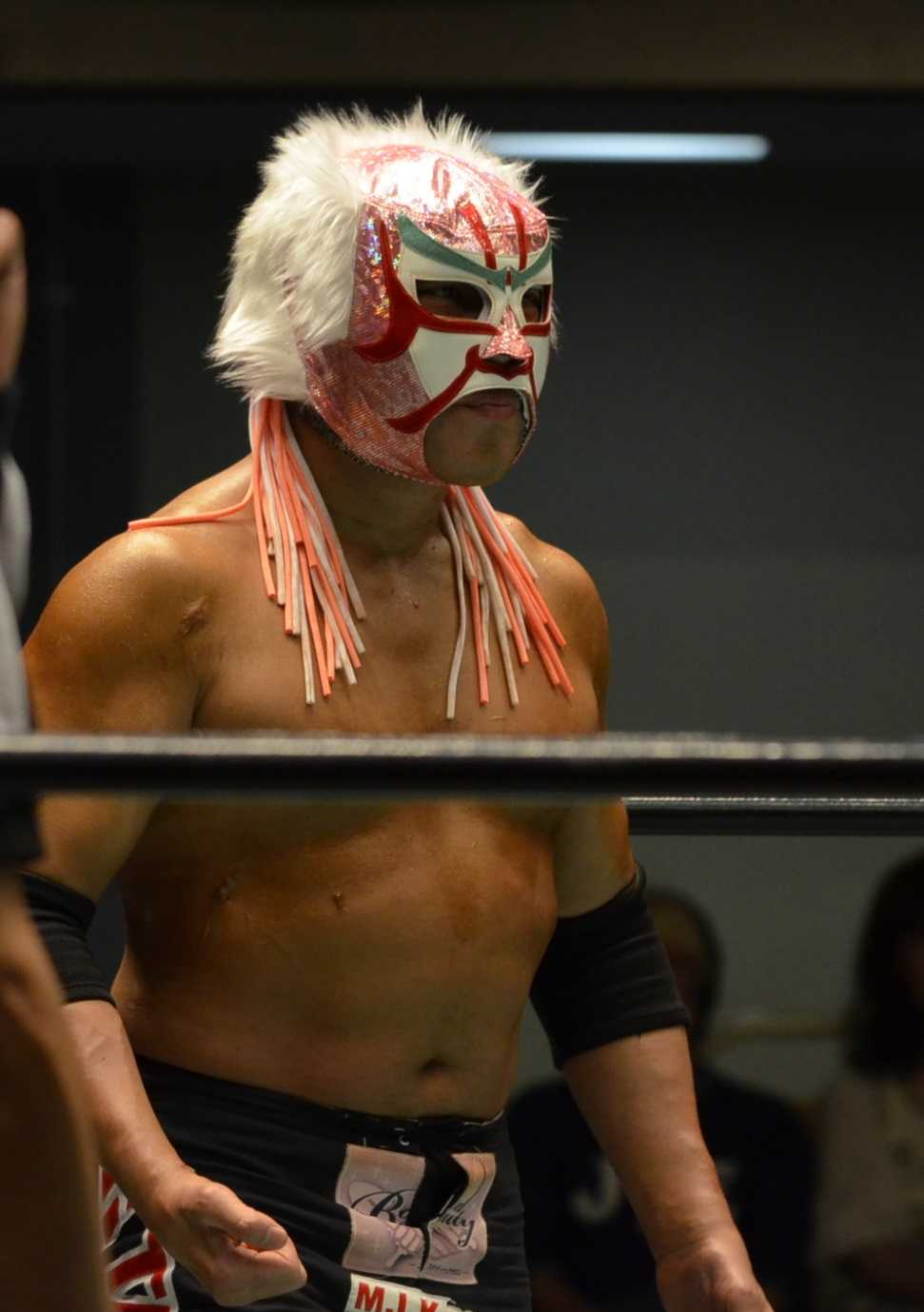
In 1996, The Great Sasuke won the NWA World Junior Heavyweight Championship as part of the eight-man "J-Crown" tournament.

In 1995, the championship was re-established by Japan's Wrestle Yume Factory (WYF) promotion, with Masayoshi Motegi being the first champion under the WYF banner. In 1996, the J-Crown tournament was held to unify eight different championship belts from five different organizations, including the NWA World Junior Heavyweight Championship. The tournament to determine the first J-Crown Champion was held over four nights, from August 2 to August 5, 1996, the same dates that NJPW's annual G1 Climax event took place, promoting two major tournaments on one tour. Jushin Thunder Liger is credited with coming up with the idea for the J-Crown. The inaugural champion was The Great Sasuke. While Último Dragón was J-Crown Champion, the titles appeared on World Championship Wrestling (WCW) programming, as Dragon also held the WCW Cruiserweight Championship and the NWA World Middleweight Championship at the time. When Liger was champion, he lost the WAR International Junior Heavyweight Championship to Yuji Yasuraoka on June 6, 1997, in Tokyo, Japan. Liger, however, continued to defend the J-Crown with seven titles instead of eight. As part of their introduction of a new WWF Light Heavyweight Championship, the WWF demanded that the then current J-Crown Champion Shinjiro Otani return the WWF Light Heavyweight belt. Otani dissolved the J-Crown on November 5, 1997, by vacating all of the component titles except for the IWGP Junior Heavyweight Championship, with the other belts being restored to their home promotions. After the dissolution of the J-Crown, the Junior Heavyweight title was returned to the NWA, who kept it vacant until March 1999, when Logan Caine won a tournament to become champion.

In 2011, The Sheik was the NWA World Heavyweight Champion but was stripped of the championship for refusing to defend against Adam Pearce. The NWA World Junior Heavyweight Champion Craig Classic vacated the title in protest. Pro Wrestling Zero1 did not recognize the vacancy and declared Classic as the real champion.

In 2014, NWA re-established its working relationship with NJPW. The champion at that time, Chase Owens, defended the title on several NJPW events. During the working relationship, Jushin Thunder Liger and Tiger Mask IV held the title. On May 1, 2017, Billy Corgan's company, Lightning One, Inc., purchased the NWA, including its name, rights, trademarks, and championships. As a result, the NWA World Junior Heavyweight Championship was vacated. Corgan's ownership took effect on October 1, 2017. The title remained vacant until March 2022 when Homicide won the title on night two of the 2022 Crockett Cup.

== Reigns ==
As of November 22, 2026, there have been 132 reigns between 82 different champions, 16 vacancies and one deactivation. Ken Fenelon was the inaugural champion. Danny Hodge holds the record for most reigns at seven. Hodge's fourth reign is the longest at 1,361 days while Fred Blassie's and Hiro Saito's were the shortest, lasting less than a day.

Hayden Backlund is the current champion, in his first reign. He won the title, which had been vacated after previous champion Spencer Slade was stripped of it, by defeating Axton Ray, Damian Fenrir and Richard Adonis in a four-way match at the NWA 78th Anniversary Show on July 25, 2026, in Philadelphia, Pennsylvania.

Key
No.	Overall reign number
Reign	Reign number for the specific champion
Days	Number of days held
<1	Reign lasted less than a day
+	Current reign is changing daily

No.	Champion	Championship change			Reign statistics		Notes	Ref.
No.	Champion	Date	Event	Location	Reign	Days	Notes	Ref.
National Wrestling Alliance (NWA)
1	Ken Fenelon	May 3, 1943	N/A	N/A	1	(Note: The exact date that Fenelon won the championship is uncertain, which means the reign lasted between 730 days and 760 days.)	Fenelon was awarded the title by Paul "Pinkie" George, founder of the Iowa-based local National Wrestling Alliance promotion.	
2	Marshall Esteppe	May 30, 1945	House show	Toronto, IA	1	216	This match was promoted by Paul "Pinkie" George's Iowa-based National Wrestling Alliance promotion.	
3	Larry Tillman	January 1, 1946	House show	Des Moines, IA	1	69	This match was promoted by Paul "Pinkie" George's Iowa-based National Wrestling Alliance promotion.	
4	Ken Fenelon	March 11, 1946	House show	Des Moines, IA	2	301	This match was promoted by Paul "Pinkie" George's Iowa-based National Wrestling Alliance promotion.	
5	Marshall Esteppe	January 6, 1947	House show	Des Moines, IA	2	77	This match was promoted by Paul "Pinkie" George's Iowa-based National Wrestling Alliance promotion.	
6	Ray Steele	March 24, 1947	House show	Des Moines, IA	1	35	This match was promoted by Paul "Pinkie" George's Iowa-based National Wrestling Alliance promotion.	
7	Marshall Esteppe	April 28, 1947	House show	Des Moines, IA	3	323	This match was promoted by Paul "Pinkie" George's Iowa-based National Wrestling Alliance promotion.	
8	Billy Goelz	March 16, 1948	House show	Des Moines, IA	1	159	This match was promoted by Paul "Pinkie" George's Iowa-based National Wrestling Alliance promotion. During this reign, the National Wrestling Alliance (NWA) is officially formed as a wrestling governing body, with the championship becoming property of the alliance and expanding out of Iowa.	
9	Al Williams	August 22, 1948	House show	Waterloo, IA	1	14		
10	Billy Goelz	September 5, 1948	House show	Waterloo, IA	2	446	The NWA withdrew its recognition of Goelz as champion on November 25, 1949.	
11	Leroy McGuirk	November 25, 1949	1949 NWA Convention	Des Moines, IA	1	74	McGuirk previously defeated John Swenski on June 19, 1939 in California to win a version of the world championship; recognized as junior heavyweight champion by the NWA during its 1949 convention. McGuirk later defeats Billy Goelz to unify the Iowa version of the NWA World Junior Heavyweight Championship into both the mainline NWA and National Wrestling Association's World Junior Heavyweight Championships.	
—	Vacated	February 7, 1950	—	—	—	—	The championship was vacated after Leroy McGuirk retired due to being blinded in a car accident.	
12	Verne Gagne	November 13, 1950	House show	Tulsa, OK	1	371	This match was promoted by NWA Tri-State. Gagne defeated Sonny Myers in a tournament final to win the vacant championship.	
13	Danny McShain	November 19, 1951	House show	Memphis, TN	1	637	This match was promoted by NWA Mid-America. McShain unified the Los Angeles version of the world title into the NWA title, defeating Rito Romero on May 25, 1952 in Los Angeles, California. Whitey Whittler defeated McShain by disqualification on October 17, 1952 in Oklahoma City, Oklahoma to claim a disputed version of the title; Red Berry additionally defeated McShain by disqualification on November 11, 1952 in Dallas, Texas to claim a version of the title. McShain defeated Whittler on November 14, 1952 in Oklahoma City and Berry on November 27, 1952 in Galveston, Texas to end their respective claims.	
14	Baron Michele Leone	August 17, 1953	House show	Memphis, TN	1	602	This match was promoted by NWA Mid-America.	
15	Ed Francis	April 11, 1955	House show	Tulsa, OK	1	365	This match was promoted by NWA Tri-State.	
16	Mike Clancy	April 10, 1956	House show	Oklahoma City, OK	1	350	This match was promoted by NWA Tri-State.	
17	Fred Blassie	March 26, 1957	House show	Nashville, TN	1	<1	This match was promoted by NWA Mid-America.	
—	Vacated	March 26, 1957	—	—	—	—	The championship was vacated after the match between Freddie Blassie and Mike Clancy ended with a controversial finish.	
18	Mike Clancy	April 9, 1957	House show	Nashville, TN	2	217	This match was promoted by NWA Mid-America. Clancy defeated Fred Blassie to win the vacant championship.	
—	Vacated	November 12, 1957	—	—	—	—	The championship was vacated after Mike Clancy defeated Jackie Fargo by disqualification.	
19	Mike Clancy	November 19, 1957	House show	Nashville, TN	3	101	This match was promoted by NWA Mid-America. Clancy defeated Fred Blassie to win the vacant championship.	
20	Angelo Savoldi	February 28, 1958	House show	Oklahoma City, OK	1	97	This match was promoted by NWA Tri-State.	
21	Dory Funk	June 5, 1958	House show	Amarillo, TX	1	36	This match was promoted by NWA Western States.	
22	Angelo Savoldi	July 11, 1958	House show	Oklahoma City, OK	2	224	This match was promoted by NWA Tri-State.	
23	Ivan the Terrible	February 20, 1959	House show	Oklahoma City, OK	1	14	This match was promoted by NWA Tri-State.	
24	Angelo Savoldi	March 6, 1959	House show	Oklahoma City, OK	3	84	This match was promoted by NWA Tri-State.	
25	Mike DiBiase	May 29, 1959	House show	Oklahoma City, OK	1	84	This match was promoted by NWA Tri-State.	
26	Angelo Savoldi	August 21, 1959	House show	Oklahoma City, OK	4	336	This match was promoted by NWA Tri-State.	
27	Danny Hodge	July 22, 1960	House show	Oklahoma City, OK	1	1,450	This match was promoted by NWA Tri-State.	
28	Hiro Matsuda	July 11, 1964	House show	Tampa, FL	1	125	This match was promoted by Championship Wrestling from Florida.	
29	Angelo Savoldi	November 13, 1964	House show	Oklahoma City, OK	5	161	This match was promoted by NWA Tri-State.	
30	Danny Hodge	April 23, 1965	House show	Oklahoma City, OK	2	214	This match was promoted by NWA Tri-State.	
31	Lorenzo Parente	November 23, 1965	House show	N/A	1	42		
32	Danny Hodge	January 4, 1966	House show	Little Rock, AR	3	10	This match was promoted by NWA Tri-State.	
33	Lorenzo Parente	January 14, 1966	House show	Oklahoma City, OK	2	29	This match was promoted by NWA Tri-State.	
34	Joe McCarthy	February 12, 1966	House show	Oklahoma City, OK	1	80	This match was promoted by NWA Tri-State.	
35	Danny Hodge	May 3, 1966	House show	Little Rock, AR	4	1,532	This match was promoted by NWA Tri-State.	
36	Sputnik Monroe	July 13, 1970	House show	Shreveport, Louisiana	1	28	This match was promoted by NWA Tri-State.	
37	Danny Hodge	August 10, 1970	House show	Tulsa, Oklahoma	5	283	This match was promoted by NWA Tri-State. Some sources list the match as taking place on September 14, 1970 in Shreveport, Louisiana.	
38	Roger Kirby	May 20, 1971	House show	New Orleans, Louisiana	1	113	This match was promoted by NWA Tri-State.	
39	Ramón Torres	September 10, 1971	House show	Oklahoma City, Oklahoma	1	84	This match was promoted by NWA Tri-State.	
40	Dr. X	December 3, 1971	House show	Oklahoma City, Oklahoma	1	108	This match was promoted by NWA Tri-State.	
41	Danny Hodge	March 20, 1972	House show	Shreveport, Louisiana	6	639	This match was promoted by NWA Tri-State.	
42	Ken Mantell	December 19, 1973	House show	Jackson, Mississippi	1	542	This match was promoted by NWA Tri-State.	
†	Wrestling Pro	September 17, 1974	House show	Mobile, Alabama	1	49	This match was promoted by Gulf Coast Championship Wrestling. Wrestling Pro was only recognized in the Alabama territory.	
†	Ken Mantell	November 5, 1974	House show	Mobile, Alabama	1^{(2)}	221	This match was promoted by Gulf Coast Championship Wrestling. Mantell defeated Wrestling Pro to end the Alabama branch of the championship.	
43	Hiro Matsuda	June 14, 1975	House show	St. Petersburg, Florida	2	262	This match was promoted by Championship Wrestling from Florida.	
44	Danny Hodge	March 2, 1976	House show	Shreveport, Louisiana	7	13	This match was promoted by NWA Tri-State.	
—	Vacated	March 15, 1976	—	—	—	—	Danny Hodge vacated the championship after being injured in a car accident.	
45	Pat Barrett	September 28, 1976	House show	Shreveport, Louisiana	1	65	This match was promoted by NWA Tri-State. Barrett defeated Nelson Royal in a tournament final to win the vacant championship.	
46	Ron Starr	December 2, 1976	House show	New Orleans, Louisiana	1	4	This match was promoted by NWA Tri-State.	
47	Nelson Royal	December 6, 1976	House show	New Orleans, Louisiana	1	566	This match was promoted by NWA Tri-State.	
48	Chavo Guerrero	February 24, 1978	House show	Unknown	1	42		
49	Nelson Royal	April 7, 1978	House show	Unknown	2	79		
50	Al Madril	June 25, 1978	House show	Houston, Texas	1	398	This match was promoted by Houston Wrestling.	
51	Nelson Royal	July 28, 1979	House show	Unknown	3	134		
—	Vacated	December 9, 1979	—	—	—	—	Nelson Royal vacated the championship upon retiring from wrestling.	
†	Steve Keirn	December 10, 1979	House show	Los Angeles, California	1	53	This match was promoted by Hollywood Wrestling. Keirn defeated Chavo Guerrero in a tournament final to seemingly win the vacant title, but the NWA did not recognize Keirn as champion. Keirn received recognition from the NWA territories Championship Wrestling from Florida, Hollywood Wrestling, and New Japan Pro-Wrestling; this version was later renamed the NWA International Junior Heavyweight Championship.	
52	Ron Starr	February 11, 1980	House show	Tulsa, Oklahoma	2	19	This match was promoted by Mid-South Wrestling. Starr defeated Les Thornton to win the vacant championship. After his victory, Starr received recognition from the NWA as champion over international champion Steve Keirn.	
53	Les Thornton	March 1, 1980	House show	Tulsa, Oklahoma	1	331	This match was promoted by Mid-South Wrestling. Thornton won the championship by forfeit after Ron Starr failed to appear for the match.	
54	Jerry Stubbs	January 26, 1981	House show	Mobile, Alabama	1	5		
55	Les Thornton	January 31, 1981	House show	Dothan, Alabama	2	127		
56	Terry Taylor	June 7, 1981	House show	Roanoke, Virginia	1	13	This match was promoted by Southern Championship Wrestling.	
57	Les Thornton	June 20, 1981	House show	Roanoke, Virginia	3	88	This match was promoted by Southern Championship Wrestling.	
58	Jerry Brisco	September 16, 1981	House show	Miami, Florida	1	30	This match was promoted by Championship Wrestling from Florida	
59	Les Thornton	October 16, 1981	House show	Knoxville, Tennessee	4	22	This match was promoted by Jim Crockett Promotions.	
60	Joe Lightfoot	November 7, 1981	House show	Bayamón, Puerto Rico	1	7	This match was promoted by Capitol Sports Promotions.	
61	Les Thornton	November 14, 1981	House show	San Juan, Puerto Rico	5	192	This match was promoted by Capitol Sports Promotions.	
62	Tiger Mask	May 25, 1982	Big Fight Series	Shizuoka, Japan	1	313	This match was promoted by New Japan Pro-Wrestling. In 1983, some North American promoters declared the title vacant due to Tiger Mask wrestling for the World Wrestling Federation, which was not a member of the NWA; however, during the annual NWA convention, the NWA announced that Tiger Mask was still recognized as the official champion and ordered its territories to recognize him as champion.	
—	Vacated	April 3, 1983	—	—	—	—	The championship was vacated after Tiger Mask suffered an injury.	
63	Tiger Mask	June 2, 1983	IWGP Championship League 1983	Tokyo, Japan	2	71	This match was promoted by New Japan Pro-Wrestling. Tiger Mask defeated Kuniaki Kobayashi to win the vacant championship.	
—	Vacated	August 12, 1983	—	—	—	—	The championship was vacated after Tiger Mask retired.	
64	The Cobra	November 3, 1983	Toukon Series	Tokyo, Japan	1	633	This match was promoted by New Japan Pro-Wrestling. The Cobra defeated Davey Boy Smith to win the vacant championship. During this reign, Les Thornton was recognized by some promoters in the United States as world champion due to The Cobra working for the World Wrestling Federation.	
†	Les Thornton	November 14, 1983	N/A	Manila, Philippines	6	201	Georgia Championship Wrestling announced that Thornton had won a (fictitious) tournament to become champion.	
—	Vacated	June 2, 1984	—	—	—	—	American promoters vacated their version of the championship after Les Thornton joined the World Wrestling Federation (WWF) ahead of its takeover of Georgia Championship Wrestling. Thornton continued to bill himself as champion, defending the title on WWF events in Georgia as the "WWF Lt. Hvywt Championship".	
†	Hector Guerrero	July 13, 1984	N/A	Los Angeles, California	1	81	Jim Crockett Promotions announced that Guerrero had won a (fictitious) tournament to become champion.	
†	Mike Davis	October 2, 1984	House show	Albuquerque, New Mexico	1	112	This match was promoted by Jim Crockett Promotions.	
†	Denny Brown	November 22, 1984	Starrcade '84: The Million Dollar Challenge	Greensboro, North Carolina	1	248	This match was promoted by Jim Crockett Promotions.	
65	Hiro Saito	July 28, 1985	Burning Spirit in Summer	Osaka, Japan	1	<1	This match was promoted by New Japan Pro-Wrestling.	
66	The Cobra	July 28, 1985	Burning Spirit in Summer	Osaka, Japan	2	4	This match was promoted by New Japan Pro-Wrestling.	
—	Vacated	August 1, 1985	—	—	—	—	The championship was vacated after New Japan Pro-Wrestling, the promotion which The Cobra performed for, pulled out of the NWA.	
67	Denny Brown	August 1, 1985	N/A	N/A	1^{(2)}	14	Brown had previously won a disputed version of the championship at Starrcade '84 by defeating Mike Davis; Brown received official recognition as champion by NWA vice president Shohei Baba, promoter of All Japan Pro Wrestling, on August 1 after New Japan Pro-Wrestling, which had controlled the championship since 1982, withdrew from the NWA.	
68	Gary Royal	August 15, 1985	House show	Kansas City, Kansas	1	31	This match was promoted by Central States Wrestling.	
69	Denny Brown	September 15, 1985	House show	Atlanta, Georgia	2^{(3)}	321	This match was promoted by Jim Crockett Promotions. The match between Brown and Gary Royal later aired on NWA World Championship Wrestling via tape delay.	
70	Steve Regal	August 2, 1986	House show	Atlanta, Georgia	1	30	This match was promoted by Jim Crockett Promotions.	
71	Denny Brown	September 1, 1986	House show	Greenville, South Carolina	3^{(4)}	187	This match was promoted by Jim Crockett Promotions.	
72	Lazor Tron	March 7, 1987	House show	Atlanta, Georgia	1^{(2)}	215	This match was promoted by Jim Crockett Promotions. The match between Lazor Tron and Denny Brown took place at WTBS's Techwood Drive TV studios and aired on NWA World Championship Wrestling. Lazor Tron previously won a disputed version of the championship under the ring name Hector Guerrero.	
—	Vacated	October 8, 1987	—	—	—	—	The championship was vacated after Lazor Tron left Jim Crockett Promotions.	
73	Nelson Royal	October 16, 1987	House show	Columbia, South Carolina	4	280	This match was promoted by Jim Crockett Promotions. Royal defeated Denny Brown for the vacant championship; the match between Royal and Brown later aired on NWA World Wide Wrestling via tape delay. Royal takes the title to Knoxville, Tennessee's USA Championship Wrestling promotion in May 1988. Masanobu Fuchi, All Japan Pro Wrestling's reigning World Junior Heavyweight Champion, received disputed recognition as the new champion; however, Royal continued promoting the title until 1989, when it was abandoned.	
74	Scott Armstrong	July 22, 1988	House show	Knoxville, Tennessee	1	1	This match was promoted by USA Championship Wrestling.	
75	Nelson Royal	July 23, 1988	House show	Hazard, Kentucky	5	8	This match was promoted by USA Championship Wrestling.	
76	Scott Armstrong	July 30, 1988	House show	Chattanooga, Tennessee	2	20	This match was promoted by USA Championship Wrestling.	
77	Nelson Royal	August 2, 1988	House show	Knoxville, Tennessee	6	108	This match was promoted by USA Championship Wrestling. USA Championship Wrestling closed in October 1988; Royal later founded Atlantic Coast Wrestling in the Carolinas and continued to bill himself as world champion.	
78	Les Anderson	November 18, 1988	House show	Unknown	1	209	This match was promoted by Atlantic Coast Wrestling. This reign is recognized by the NWA but not Pro Wrestling Zero1 as part of their NWA World Junior Heavyweight Championship history.	
79	Rock the Hunter	June 15, 1989	House show	Unknown	1	27	This match was promoted by Atlantic Coast Wrestling. This reign is recognized by the NWA but not Pro Wrestling Zero1 as part of their NWA World Junior Heavyweight Championship history.	
80	Les Anderson	December 25, 1989	House show	Unknown	2	1	This match was promoted by Atlantic Coast Wrestling. This reign is recognized by the NWA but not Pro Wrestling Zero1 as part of their NWA World Junior Heavyweight Championship history.	
—	Deactivated	December 26, 1989	—	—	—	—	The championship was abandoned after Atlantic Coast Wrestling closed.	
81	Masayoshi Motegi	August 30, 1995	Wrestling Bargain Sale Jump! Fly! Sho! '95	Tokyo, Japan	1	338	This match was promoted by Wrestle Yume Factory. Motegi defeated El Hijo del Santo in a tournament final to revive the championship.	
82	The Great Sasuke	August 2, 1996	G1 Climax 1996	Tokyo, Japan	1	70	This match was promoted by New Japan Pro-Wrestling. The Great Sasuke won an eight-man tournament to decide the first holder of the J-Crown, a combination of eight titles categorized junior heavyweight or lower (including the NWA World Junior Heavyweight Championship). These titles were still considered separate, as opposed to one unified championship, and continued to be defended separately on occasion.	
83	Último Dragón	October 11, 1996	Osaka Crush Night!	Osaka, Japan	1	85	This match was promoted by Wrestle Association R.	
84	Jushin Thunder Liger	January 4, 1997	Wrestling World 1997	Tokyo, Japan	1	183	This match was promoted by New Japan Pro-Wrestling.	
85	El Samurai	July 6, 1997	Summer Struggle 1997	Sapporo, Japan	1	35	This match was promoted by New Japan Pro-Wrestling.	
86	Shinjiro Otani	August 10, 1997	The Four Heaven in Nagoya Dome	Nagoya, Japan	1	87	This match was promoted by New Japan Pro-Wrestling.	
—	Vacated	November 5, 1997	—	—	—	—	The championship was vacated when the J-Crown was dissolved upon the request of the World Wrestling Federation. All of the component titles were returned to their home promotions.	
87	Logan Caine	March 5, 1999	House show	Parkersburg, West Virginia	1	237	Caine defeated Viper in a tournament final to win the vacant championship.	
—	Vacated	October 28, 1999	—	—	—	—	The championship was vacated after Logan Caine failed to appear for a title defense against Vince Kaplack.	
88	Vince Kaplack	October 28, 1999	House show	Pittsburgh, Pennsylvania	1	78	This match was promoted by Pro Wrestling eXpress. Kaplack defeated Chris Hero, who was serving as a replacement for Logan Caine.	
89	Tony Kozina	January 14, 2000	House show	North Versailles, Pennsylvania	1	190	This match was promoted by Pro Wrestling eXpress.	
90	Rockford 2000	July 22, 2000	House show	Surrey, British Columbia, Canada	1	35	This match was promoted by NWA: Extreme Canadian Championship Wrestling.	
91	Tony Kozina	August 30, 2000	N/A	N/A	2	39	Kozina was awarded the championship by NWA officials after Rockford's victory over him was reversed.	
92	Vince Kaplack	October 14, 2000	NWA 52nd Anniversary Show	Nashville, Tennessee	2	175		
93	Rocky Reynolds	April 7, 2001	House show	Pennsboro, West Virginia	1	27	This match was promoted by NWA Southwest.	
94	Mike Thunder	May 4, 2001	House show	North Richland Hills, Texas	1	109	This match was promoted by NWA Southwest.	
95	Lex Lovett	August 21, 2001	House show	Tampa, Florida	1	53		
96	Jason Rumble	October 13, 2001	NWA 53rd Anniversary Show	Saint Petersburg, Florida	1	112	Rumble defeated Lex Lovett, Jimmy Rave, Brandon K, and BJ Turner in a five-way match.	
97	Rocky Reynolds	February 2, 2002	House show	Titusville, Pennsylvania	2	14	This match was promoted by Pro Wrestling eXpress.	
98	Jason Rumble	February 16, 2002	House show	Malden, Massachusetts	2	49		
99	Rocky Reynolds	April 6, 2002	House show	Parkersburg, West Virginia	3	56		
100	Jimmy Rave	June 29, 2002	House show	Cornelia, Georgia	1	42	This match was promoted by NWA Wildside. Rave defeated Rocky Reynolds and Jeremy Lopez in a three-way match.	
101	Star	August 10, 2002	House show	Columbia, Tennessee	1	7		
102	Jimmy Rave	August 17, 2002	House show	Columbia, Tennessee	2	154		
103	Brother Love	January 18, 2003	House show	Greenville, Mississippi	1	140		
104	Rocky Reynolds	June 7, 2003	House show	Parkersburg, West Virginia	4	56		
105	Chris Draven	August 2, 2003	House show	Parkersburg, West Virginia	1	161		
106	Jerrelle Clark	January 10, 2004	House show	St. Petersburg, Florida	1	281		
107	Jason Rumble	October 17, 2004	NWA 56th Anniversary Show	Winnipeg, Manitoba, Canada	3	312	Rumble defeated Jerrelle Clark and Vance Desmond in a three-way match.	
108	Black Tiger IV	August 25, 2005	House show	Columbia, Tennessee	1	178		
109	Tiger Mask IV	February 19, 2006	Circuit 2006 Acceleration	Tokyo, Japan	1	446	This match was promoted by New Japan Pro-Wrestling.	
110	Mike Quackenbush	May 11, 2007	Chapter Two	Portage, Indiana	1	1,275	This match was promoted by Fight Sports Midwest.	
111	Craig Classic	November 6, 2010	November Coming Fire	Fort Pierce, Florida	1	247	This match was promoted by NWA Florida.	
—	Vacated	September 20, 2011	—	—	—	—	Classic relinquished the title in protest of The Sheik being stripped of the NWA World Heavyweight Championship. Classic brought his own version of the title to Pro Wrestling Zero1, which is referred as the "New Wrestling Alliance World Junior Heavyweight Championship".	
112	Kevin Douglas	October 7, 2011	House show	Charlotte, North Carolina	1	373	This match was promoted by NWA Revival. Douglas defeated Chase Owens in a tournament final to win the vacant championship.	
—	Vacated	October 13, 2012	—	—	—	—	Kevin Douglas was stripped of the title for no-showing a scheduled title defense on October 13, 2012 against Chase Owens. A one-night tournament was held in Kingsport, Tennessee in lieu of the Douglas-Owens match.	
113	Chase Owens	October 13, 2012	House show	Kingsport, Tennessee	1	301	This match was promoted by NWA Smoky Mountain. Owens defeated Matt Conard and Zac Vincent in a three-way tournament final.	
114	Jason Kincaid	August 10, 2013	House show	Kingsport, Tennessee	1	69	This match was promoted by NWA Smoky Mountain.	
115	Chase Owens	October 18, 2013	House show	Houston, Texas	2	78	This match was promoted by NWA Houston.	
116	Ricky Morton	January 4, 2014	House show	Kingsport, Tennessee	1	62	This match was promoted by NWA Smoky Mountain.	
117	Chase Owens	March 7, 2014	House show	Church Hill, Tennessee	3	246	This match was promoted by NWA Smoky Mountain.	
118	Jushin Thunder Liger	November 8, 2014	Power Struggle	Osaka, Japan	2	156	This match was promoted by New Japan Pro-Wrestling.	
119	Steve Anthony	April 13, 2015	Casino Royale	Las Vegas, Nevada	1	163	This match was promoted by Vendetta Pro Wrestling.	
120	Tiger Mask IV	September 23, 2015	Destruction in Okayama	Okayama, Japan	2	178	This match was promoted by New Japan Pro-Wrestling.	
121	Steve Anthony	March 19, 2016	Road to Invasion Attack 2016	Nagoya, Japan	2	112	This match was promoted by New Japan Pro-Wrestling.	
122	John Saxon	July 9, 2016	House show	Pensacola, Florida	1	275		
123	Arrick Andrews	April 8, 2017	House show	Dyersburg, Tennessee	1	41	This match was promoted by NWA Mid-South.	
124	Mr. USA	May 19, 2017	House show	Franklin, Kentucky	1	85	This match was promoted by NWA New South.	
125	Barrett Brown	August 12, 2017	House show	Dyersburg, Tennessee	1	49	This match was promoted by NWA Mid-South.	
—	Vacated	September 30, 2017	—	—	—	—	The championship was vacated after the NWA terminated its contracts with its licensees. The NWA is purchased by Billy Corgan's Lightning One Inc. company and gradually transforms into a stand-alone wrestling promotion.	
National Wrestling Alliance/Lightning One Inc.
126	Homicide	March 20, 2022	The Crockett Cup; Night 2	Nashville, Tennessee	1	237	Homicide defeated Austin Aries, Colby Corino, and Darius Lockhart in a four-way match to win the vacant championship.	
127	Kerry Morton	November 12, 2022	Hard Times 3	New Orleans, Louisiana	1	287		
128	Colby Corino	August 26, 2023	NWA 75th Anniversary Show	St. Louis, Missouri	1	189		
129	Joe Alonzo	March 2, 2024	Hard Times 4	Dothan, Alabama	1	118	Aired on Powerrr via tape delay on April 9, 2024.	
130	Alex Taylor	June 28, 2024	NWA Chicago Endless Summer	Highland Park, IL	1	476		
131	Spencer Slade	October 17, 2025	Samhain: Part 3	Atlanta, GA	1	281	Aired on tape delay on January 20, 2026 as a special episode of Powerrr.	
—	Vacated	July 25, 2026	NWA 78th Anniversary Show	Philadelphia, PA	—	—	Spencer Slade was stripped of the championship by NWA president Billy Corgan due to his involvement in the Federation of Champions' attack on Bryan Idol's mother at Hard Times 6.	
132	Hayden Backlund	July 25, 2026	NWA 78th Anniversary Show	Philadelphia, PA	1	120+	Defeated Damian Fenrir, Axton Ray and Richard Adonis in a four-way match to win the vacant title. Aired on tape delay on August 29, 2026 as a special episode of Powerrr.	

== Combined reigns ==
As of November 22, 2026.

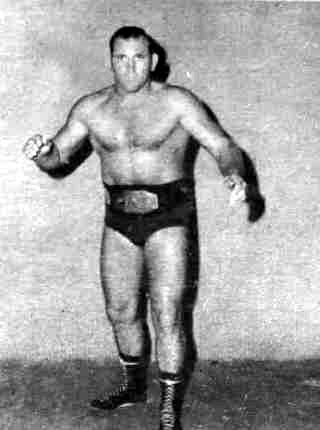
Most combined days at a record-setting 4,134 days and record 7-time champion Danny Hodge

†	Indicates the current champion
¤	The exact length of a title reign is uncertain; the combined length may not be correct.

Rank	Wrestler	No. of reigns	Combined days
1	Danny Hodge	7	4,141
2	Mike Quackenbush	1	1,275
3	Ken Fenelon	2	1,031–1,061¤
4	Angelo Savoldi	5	902
5	Nelson Royal	6	846
6	Mike Clancy	3	768
7	Denny Brown	3^{(4)}	756
8	The Cobra	2	637
8	Danny McShain	1	637
10	Chase Owens	3	626
11	Tiger Mask IV	2	624
12	Baron Michele Leone	1	602
13	Hiro Matsuda	2	548
14	Ken Mantell	1^{(2)}	493
15	Alex Taylor	1	476
16	Jason Rumble	3	473
17	Les Thornton	6	429
18	Leroy McGuirk	1	406
19	Al Madril	1	398
20	Tiger Mask	2	384
21	Kevin Douglas	1	373
22	Verne Gagne	1	371
23	Marshall Esteppe	3	370
24	Ed Francis	1	364
25	Jushin Thunder Liger	2	339
26	Masayoshi Motegi	1	338
27	Kerry Morton	1	287
28	Jerrelle Clark	1	281
28	Spencer Slade	1	281
30	John Saxon	1	275
30	Steve Anthony	2	275
32	Vince Kaplack	2	253
33	Craig Classic	1	247
34	Homicide	1	237
34	Logan Caine	1	237
36	Tony Kozina	2	229
37	Jimmy Rave	2	196
38	Colby Corino	1	189
39	Rocky Reynolds	4	181
40	Black Tiger IV	1	178
41	Chris Draven	1	161
42	Billy Goelz	2	159
43	Brother Love	1	140
44	Hayden Backlund †	1	120+
45	Joe Alonzo	1	118
46	Roger Kirby	1	113
—	Mike Davis	—	112
47	Mike Thunder	1	109
48	Dr. X	1	108
49	Shinjiro Otani	1	87
50	Mr. USA	1	85
50	Último Dragón	1	85
52	Mike DiBiase	1	84
52	Ramón Torres	1	84
54	Hector Guerrero/Lazor Tron	1^{(2)}	81
55	Joe McCarthy	1	80
56	Chavo Guerrero Sr.	2	79
57	Lorenzo Parente	2	71
58	The Great Sasuke	1	70
59	Pat Barrett	1	69
59	Larry Tillman	1	69
59	Jason Kincaid	1	69
62	Ricky Morton	1	62
63	Lex Lovett	1	53
—	Wrestling Pro	—	49
64	Barrett Brown	1	49
65	Arrick Andrews	1	41
66	Dory Funk	1	36
67	Ray Steele	1	35
67	El Samurai	1	35
69	Gary Royal	1	31
70	Steve Regal	1	30
71	Sputnik Monroe	1	28
72	Al Williams	1	14
72	Ivan the Terrible	1	14
74	Joe Lightfoot	1	7
74	Star	1	7
76	Jerry Stubbs	1	5
77	Ron Starr	2	4
78	Scott Armstrong	2	1
78	Les Anderson	2	1
80	Hiro Saito	1	<1
80	Fred Blassie	1	<1
82	Rock the Hunter	1	N/A

== See also ==
- WWF Junior Heavyweight Championship
