= Cruiserweight (professional wrestling) =

Weight class used in professional wrestling

In this highlight reel from 2011, the professional wrestler Pac performs a variety of maneuvers considered in line with the cruiserweight style.

In professional wrestling, Cruiserweight is a weight class but also a term for a fast-paced, aerial-based style of performer. The term was coined in the United States in 1996 by World Championship Wrestling (WCW). Prior to this, the terms "Light Heavyweight" and "Junior Heavyweight" were more commonly in use. The older term Junior Heavyweight is still favored in Japan, where many titles for lighter-weight competitors are called Junior Heavyweight titles. Prominent Japanese Junior Heavyweight titles include New Japan Pro-Wrestling (NJPW)'s IWGP Junior Heavyweight Championship, Pro Wrestling Noah (Noah)'s GHC Junior Heavyweight Championship, and All Japan Pro Wrestling (AJPW)'s World Junior Heavyweight championships.

The weight limit used by WCW and Japanese promotions is "up to 225 lbs" (102 kg), while the World Wrestling Federation (WWF, later WWE) used 205 lb (93 kg) as its weight limit. Due to the scripted nature of professional wrestling and that the billed weight of wrestlers can be changed, weight classes usually are not strictly enforced as they are in professional boxing and mixed martial arts (MMA). NJPW and Noah also have Junior Heavyweight tag team titles, for teams composed of Junior Heavyweight wrestlers. WCW tested such a format with their own title shortly before the company was purchased by the WWF. In 2016, WWE relaunched its Cruiserweight Championship using a 205 lb weight limit, and also introduced a dedicated weekly program, 205 Live, focusing exclusively on Cruiserweight wrestlers.

Cruiserweight divisions and championships have risen to much greater prominence in wrestling promotions in Japan and Mexico than the United States. While there have been various wrestling companies over the years that have promoted Cruiserweight/Junior Heavyweight titles and divisions in the U.S., they have had comparatively little prominence when compared to World Heavyweight champions.

== Wrestlers ==
Cruiserweight wrestlers are generally shorter and possess less muscle bulk than Heavyweight wrestler, a build which lends itself to a high-flying wrestling style. While there are many Cruiserweights who specialize in alternate wrestling styles, Cruiserweights are strongly associated with moves performed from the top rope and moves requiring a degree of speed, agility, balance and torque. Cruiserweight wrestling is often associated with Mexican lucha libre, where similar moves and match pacing are used, but Mexico uses a different weight class system and the actual term "Cruiserweight" (crucero, in Spanish) is rarely used in favor of Light Heavyweight (peso semicompleto in Spanish). Cruiserweight wrestlers tend to be wrestlers of average human height and weight.

The high spots often performed by Cruiserweights are visually impressive but carry a varying degree of risk. Cruiserweight matches are not limited to such moves and due to the greater speed and agility of the wrestlers can involve more technical grappling than that seen in Heavyweight divisions. A match with little to no transition between the spots is known as a spotfest. While spotfests do occur featuring Heavyweights, the term is typically more used for Cruiserweights, arguably because many of the fast-paced exchanges do not lend themselves as well to ring psychology as the more deliberately paced power moves and holds common in a Heavyweight match. Some fans and wrestlers alike use the term "spotmonkey" to describe wrestlers whose matches consist primarily of high spots. In the United States, the term is generally meant as an insult and derogatory criticism, suggesting that the wrestlers have to rely on risky spots to get a reaction from fans due to a lack of charisma, personality and understanding of psychology.

Championships contested by Cruiserweights cannot be held by wrestlers who are not Cruiserweights, but Cruiserweights are normally eligible to compete for Heavyweight championships (e.g. Rey Mysterio winning the World Heavyweight Championship at WrestleMania 22 despite being just under 200 lbs).

== Promotions ==
=== WCW ===
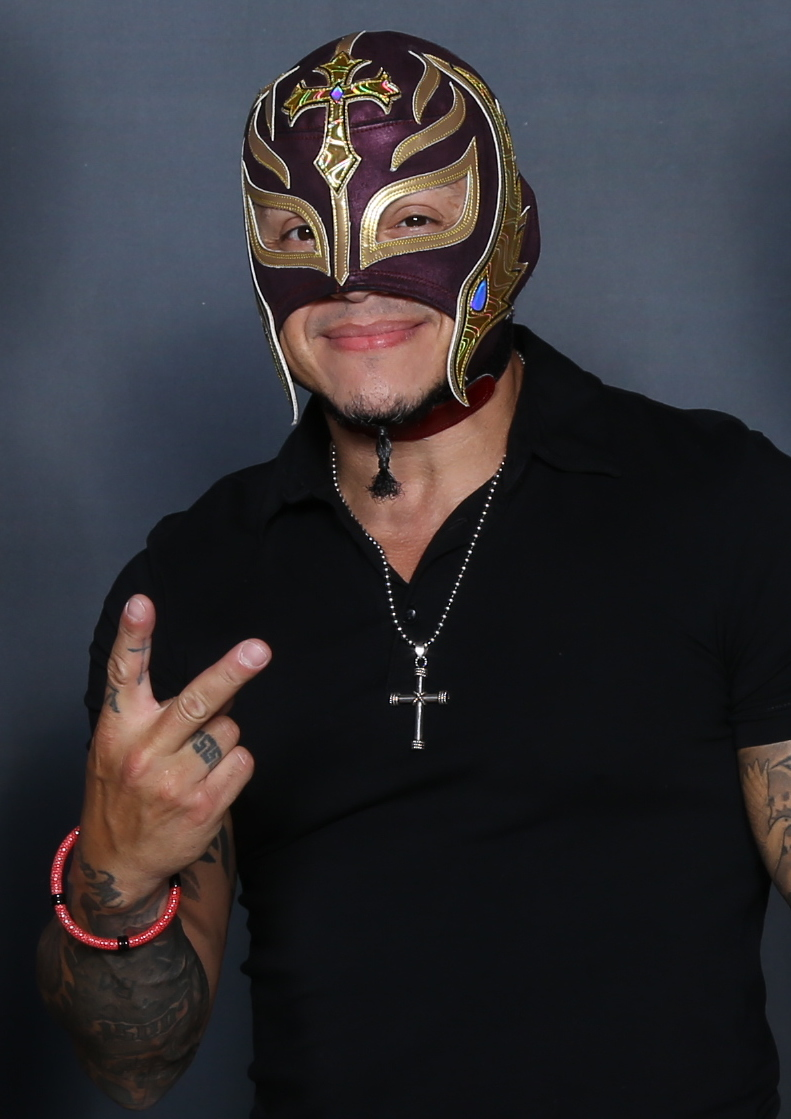
5 time WCW Cruiserweight Champion Rey Mysterio

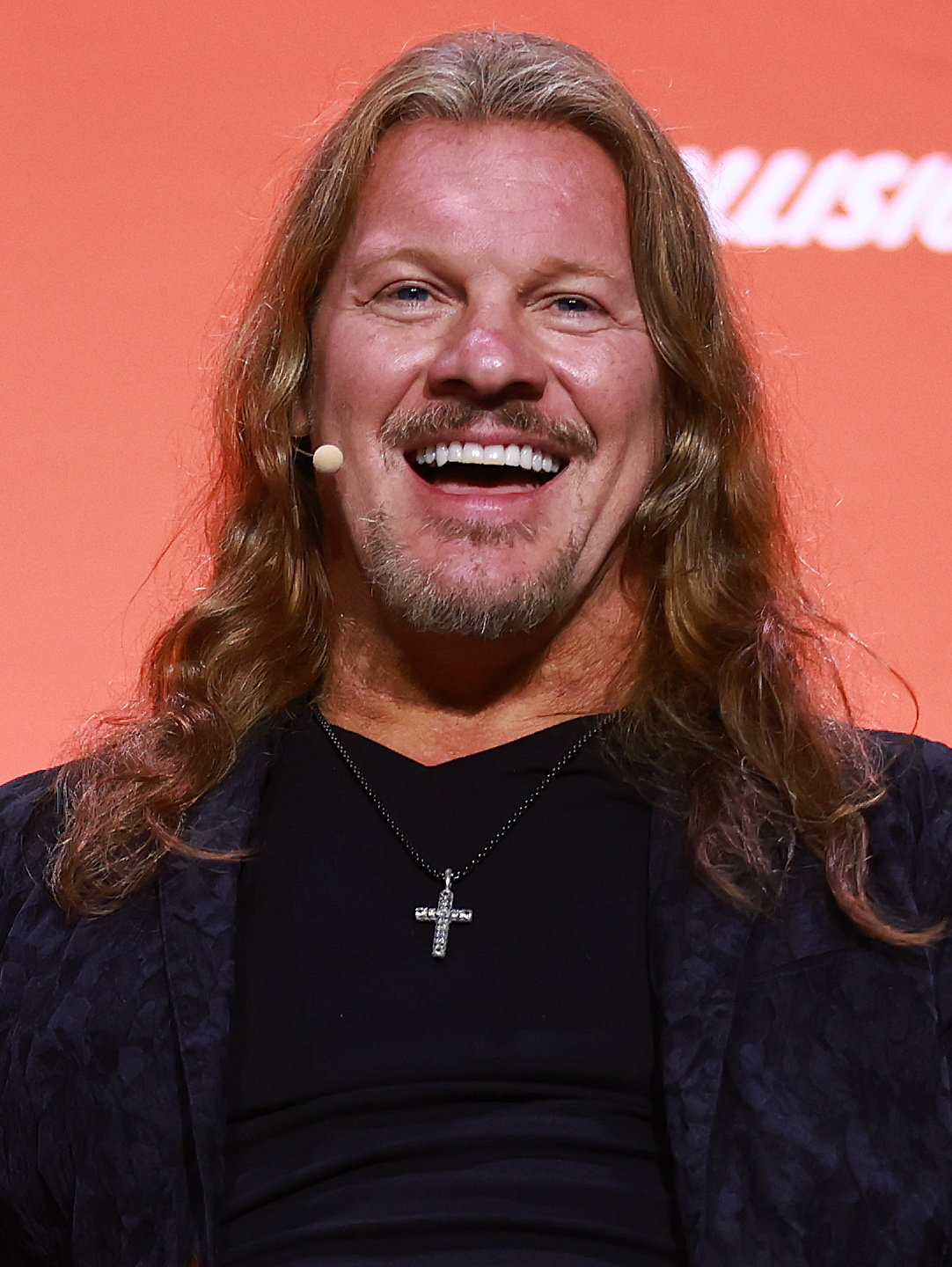
4 time WCW Cruiserweight Champion Chris Jericho

The WCW Cruiserweight division is widely credited with highlighting and benefiting a generation of smaller-sized, high-flying agile wrestlers in an era when "big men" were the norm. It produced long-lasting stars such as Rey Mysterio and Chris Jericho

In the spring of 1996, World Championship Wrestling (WCW) introduced its "Cruiserweight division", a segmented portion of the roster featuring smaller, faster and more agile wrestlers that contrasted starkly, both visually and stylistically, with their Heavyweight counterparts. Although weight categories were not a new concept in wrestling or even WCW, the WCW Cruiserweight division was quickly able to form a unique and popular identity by integrating and mixing wrestlers from all around the world and from vastly different wrestling styles, particularly masked Mexican luchadores such as Rey Mysterio, Psychosis, and Juventud Guerrera, but also Japanese "Super Juniors" such as Shinjiro Otani and Último Dragón. American and Canadian wrestlers, such as Chris Jericho, Eddie Guerrero, Dean Malenko and Chris Benoit, who had traveled abroad to Mexico and Japan earlier in their careers and learnt the local styles were also able to thrive in the division. The division as a whole became a showcase of a fast-paced, aerial and athletic style of wrestling which became highly influential in both the short and long term in the industry. Eric Bischoff has credited with the division as becoming a defining feature of Monday Nitro that was as fundamental to the late 1990s popularity of WCW as the New World Order faction:

I think the cruiserweight division and the talent represented therein probably had as much to do with the success of Nitro as the nWo storyline and Hulk Hogan, Scott Hall, and Kevin Nash. I don’t think people recognize it. The talent in that division not only helped Nitro consistently defeat WWE...that talent forced WWE, as much as the nWo, to change the way they were presenting the product.

— Eric Bischoff, speaking in 2020

However, in the years following the launch of the division, many argued that the Cruiserweights gradually became a less important part of the show and secondary to the Heavyweight wrestlers. In 2008, Rey Mysterio voiced this view:

The division kicked off to a certain point but they never put us on top, and when they unmasked us it all came tumbling down. Those in charge of WCW had the mindset that only big men could draw and didn't create new superstars. But wrestling now has changed so much. Chris Benoit, Eddie Guerrero and Chris Jericho have all been world champions, but back in WCW they were mainly cruiserweights. Also the top guys in WCW were scared that fans were more interested in watching luchadore action and high-flying moves than big men just going out there and stomping on each other for 10 minutes. The heavyweights were getting into Eric Bischoff's ear, saying: "We can't let these guys be on top. They're small and wrestling has never been about this, we've got to keep the tradition going." It was stupid for Eric Bischoff, who was running a huge company like WCW, to listen to other people. Vince McMahon runs his own company and does what he wants to do, as did Paul Heyman. Wrestling is about what the fans want, not what the boys want.

=== WWE ===
In 1965, WWE, while operating under the name of the World Wide Wrestling Federation (WWWF), created the WWWF Junior Heavyweight Championship. Initially, the title was used from September 1965 until sometime in 1972. During this period, the title was held four times by Johnny De Fazio and was vacated after his retirement in 1972. The championship was reactivated in January 1978 with the first new champion being Carlos Jose Estrada. By this time, the company had renamed itself to the World Wrestling Federation (WWF) and engaged in a cross promotional agreement with New Japan Pro-Wrestling (NJPW). Three days after Estrada won the vacant title, he was defeated by Tatsumi Fujinami. Going forward, the title was almost exclusively used by NJPW while the WWF retained ownership. The title was vacated and retired for the final time on October 31, 1985, as a result of NJPW and the WWF ending their working relationship.

In early 1981, the company created the WWF Light Heavyweight Championship, though unlike the WWF Junior Heavyweight Championship, the Light Heavyweight Championship was used primarily in Mexico due to a working agreement with the Mexican promotion Universal Wrestling Association (UWA). NJPW also recognized the championship and the title was used as part of several cross promotional cards between NJPW and the UWA. The WWF's working agreement with the UWA came to an end in 1995 and the title was returned to the WWF by 1997. The WWF did not sanction the reign of any of the previous champions, adopting a revisionist history tactic with the company claiming that the title was created in 1997. The title remained activated from December 7, 1997 (although it was effectively in hiatus throughout 1999), until it was retired in early 2002.

After the WWF acquired the intellectual property of WCW in 2001, the WWF Light Heavyweight Championship was abandoned in favor of the WCW Cruiserweight Championship, and the title was renamed the WWF Cruiserweight Championship. The Cruiserweight Championship was deactivated after the September 28, 2007 episode of SmackDown!, with Hornswoggle as its final champion; in-universe, SmackDown's acting general manager Vickie Guerrero stripped the title from Hornswoggle out of concern for his well-being, since he was allegedly Mr. McMahon's illegitimate son.

None of the preceding championships were particularly prominent in the company; however, over the years the notion of lighter wrestlers becoming main event stars has become more accepted in WWE due to many of the top talents over the past 15 years arguably falling into the Cruiserweight category. As a result, a very substantial portion of WWE's roster are billed at, slightly less, or slightly more than 220 lbs. Many lighter wrestlers have achieved main event status within WWE and, over the years, have won several world championships. For instance, the billed weight of former WWE World Heavyweight Champion Daniel Bryan is 210 lbs. Other lighter wrestlers who have risen to prominence as main eventers and world champions include Shawn Michaels, Chris Jericho, Dolph Ziggler, Christian, Rey Mysterio, Kurt Angle, Jeff Hardy, Eddie Guerrero, Chris Benoit, CM Punk, Seth Rollins, Finn Balor, A.J. Styles, and Kofi Kingston.

In 2016, WWE began to re-launch its Cruiserweight division with a WWE Network event series known as the Cruiserweight Classic—a 32-man tournament with participants billed as being under 205 pounds (93 kg), the lower limit of cruiserweight in MMA. The Cruiserweight Classic was won by T. J. Perkins, who became inaugural holder of the new WWE Cruiserweight Championship. The new championship was initially part of the Raw brand, and did not share the same title history as the previous Cruiserweight Championship that was retired in 2007. In November 2016, WWE Network introduced a new weekly program known as WWE 205 Live, which primarily featured Cruiserweight matches. The Cruiserweight Championship was defended on both Raw and 205 Live until 2018, when 205 Live became a separate brand.

In late 2019, WWE began to merge 205 Live into the NXT brand and creative, including renaming its championship the NXT Cruiserweight Championship, allowing NXT Cruiserweights to appear on 205 Live, and the 205 Live roster to appear on WWE NXT.

In September 2021, NXT was relaunched to revert it to primarily being a developmental territory. During the NXT New Year's Evil special on January 4, 2022, Carmelo Hayes defeated the reigning NXT Cruiserweight champion Roderick Strong to unify the title with his NXT North American Championship; the NXT Cruiserweight Championship was subsequently retired. 205 Live was cancelled and replaced by the NXT spin-off NXT Level Up the following month.

=== TNA ===
In 2002, Total Nonstop Action Wrestling (TNA) introduced the "X Division"—an openweight class and championship that places an emphasis on fast-paced matches and high-flying moves. Although it is not specifically promoted as a cruiserweight division, the majority of X Division champions have been cruiserweights, with Kurt Angle, Samoa Joe, Abyss, Lashley, and Moose being notable exceptions. In August 2011, the division was given a 225 lb (102 kg) weight limit before returning to being an openweight division by June 10, 2012, when the 280 lb (130 kg) Samoa Joe was allowed to challenge the title Slammiversary 10.

In 2013, the weight limit returned, only for it to be repealed in August of that year after the new rules were rejected by fans.

As part of TNA's talent exchange agreement with NXT, Moose defended the X Division Championship against Lexis King on the February 25, 2025 episode of WWE NXT—marking the first time a TNA title was defended on a WWE television program.

== Major championships ==
The following is a list of active and defunct titles equivalent to a Cruiserweight championship. Title names vary, but may include the terms Cruiserweight, Lightweight, Middleweight, Mid-Heavyweight, Flyweight, Welterweight, Featherweight, Junior Heavyweight, or X Division, among many other names. While these weight class listings typically refer to separate divisions in amateur wrestling, boxing, and other combat sports, their use in professional wrestling is almost interchangeable.

=== Africa ===
- AWA African Cruiserweight Championship
- AWA Lightweight Championship
- WWP World Cruiserweight Championship

=== Asia ===
- BJW Junior Heavyweight Championship (1998–2002)
- BJW Junior Heavyweight Championship (2017–present)
- GHC Junior Heavyweight Championship
- GHC Junior Heavyweight Tag Team Championship
- Independent World Junior Heavyweight Championship
- International Junior Heavyweight Championship (Zero1 version)
- IWGP Junior Heavyweight Championship
- IWGP Junior Heavyweight Tag Team Championship
- NWA International Junior Heavyweight Championship
- NWA International Light Heavyweight Championship
- NWA International Lightweight Tag Team Championship
- NWA World Junior Heavyweight Championship (Zero1 version)
- Philippine Hybrid X Championship
- Rings Light-Heavyweight Championship
- Tenryu Project International Junior Heavyweight Championship
- Tenryu Project International Junior Heavyweight Tag Team Championship
- Tohoku Junior Heavyweight Championship
- World Junior Heavyweight Championship (AJPW version)
- Wrestle-1 Cruiser Division Championship

=== Australia ===
- Australian Light Heavyweight Championship
- Australian Middleweight Championship
- NWA World Light Heavyweight Championship (Australian version)
- World Light Heavyweight Championship (Australian version)
- WWA International Cruiserweight Championship

=== Europe ===
- British Commonwealth Junior Heavyweight Championship
- British Flyweight Championship
- British Heavy Middleweight Championship
- British Light Heavyweight Championship
- British Lightweight Championship
- British Middleweight Championship
- British Mid-Heavyweight Championship
- British Welterweight Championship
- CWA World Junior Heavyweight Championship
- ICW Zero-G Championship

=== North America ===
- AAA World Cruiserweight Championship
- AWA World Light Heavyweight Championship
- CMLL World Light Heavyweight Championship
- CMLL World Lightweight Championship
- CMLL World Middleweight Championship
- CMLL World Welterweight Championship
- CZW World Junior Heavyweight Championship
- GWF Light Heavyweight Championship
- MLW World Middleweight Championship (Note: Contested under 205 lb weight limit)
- Mexican National Cruiserweight Championship
- Mexican National Light Heavyweight Championship
- Mexican National Lightweight Championship
- Mexican National Middleweight Championship
- Mexican National Welterweight Championship
- NWA Shockwave Cruiser X Championship
- NWA Southwest Junior Heavyweight Championship
- NWA World Junior Heavyweight Championship
- NWA World Junior Heavyweight Championship (Iowa version)
- NWA World Junior Heavyweight Championship (Los Angeles version)
- NWA World Light Heavyweight Championship
- NWA World Light Heavyweight Championship (New Jersey version)
- NWA World Middleweight Championship
- NWA World Welterweight Championship
- NXT Cruiserweight Championship (Note: Contested under 205 lb weight limit)
- OVW Light Heavyweight Championship
- TNA X Division Championship (Note: Contested under 225 lb weight limit from March to October 2012; no official weight limit before or since that period, though in practice most champions tend to be Cruiserweights)
- UCW-Zero Ultra-X Championship
- WCW Light Heavyweight Championship
- WCW/WWE Cruiserweight Championship
- WCW Cruiserweight Tag Team Championship
- WCW Women's Cruiserweight Championship
- WCWA Light Heavyweight Championship
- WWF Junior Heavyweight Championship
- WWF Light Heavyweight Championship
- XWF World Cruiserweight Championship
- Zero1 USA World Junior Heavyweight Championship

== See also ==
- Lucha libre
- Professional wrestling weight classes
- Styles of wrestling
- X Division
