= Mike Clancy =

American professional wrestler (1924–1988)

Personal information
- Born: Cristopher J. Clancy; September 9, 1924 Woburn, Massachusetts, U.S.
- Died: June 11, 1988 (aged 63) Tulsa, Oklahoma, U.S.

Professional wrestling career
- Ring name(s): Irish Mike Clancy; King Clancy; Mighty Titan
- Billed height: 5 ft 10 in (1.78 m)
- Billed weight: 209 lb (95 kg)
- Debut: 1948
- Retired: 1967

Cristopher J. Clancy (born September 9, 1924 – June 11, 1988), better known as Mike Clancy, was an American professional wrestler, sheriff and businessman. Clancy became a prominent performer throughout the National Wrestling Alliance from 1948 to 1967, capturing the NWA World Junior Heavyweight Championship and having feuds with Lou Thesz, Verne Gagne and Freddie Blassie.

== Early life ==
Born to John and Mary Clancy in 1924, Clancy attended Warren Academy and wrestled as an amateur in his youth. During World War II Clancy served in the United States Coast Guard. He began his professional wrestling career in 1945 at the close of the war.

== Professional wrestling career ==
Clancy competed throughout the United States from 1945. He became a mainstay for various National Wrestling Alliance promotions over the next decade and on April 10, 1956, he captured his first world title by defeating Ed Francis for the NWA World Junior Heavyweight Championship. Clancy lost the title for the final time against Angelo Savoldi in 1958. Clancy defeated Jackie Fargo for the NWA Southern Junior Heavyweight Championship in December 1959 and also won the NWA World Tag Team Championship with Oni Wiki and the United States Tag Team Championship with Al Lovelock.

During one match, he was 'attacked' by Mr. Moto outside the ring with a shoe. Moto was a native of Hawaii but was billed from Japan, whom the United States had only recently accepted surrender from, ending World War II. One fan became so enraged at the 'attack' that he took out a knife and indicted to a security guard called Billy Jack that he intended to "kill the bad guy". Jack, who was armed, told the fan that he disliked Moto also and told him to do it. As the fan approached the ring, Jack disarmed him from behind and stopped the potential assault.

== Post-wrestling and retirement ==
Clancy retired from professional wrestling in 1967 and relocated to Tulsa, Oklahoma, where he became the owner of "Clancy's Pizza Parlor" and county Sheriff. He died on June 11, 1988, in Tulsa.

== Championships and accomplishments ==
- Mid-Atlantic Championship Wrestling
  - NWA Mid-Atlantic Tag Team Championship (3 times)
- National Wrestling Alliance
  - NWA World Junior Heavyweight Championship
  - NWA World Tag Team Championship
- NWA Mid-America
  - AWA Southern Tag Team Championship (2 times)
  - NWA Southern Junior Heavyweight Championship
