= Mike McGuirk =

American professional wrestling personality (born 1955)

Michelle McGuirk
- Born: Michelle Kathleen McGuirk; March 16, 1955 (age 71); Tulsa, Oklahoma, U.S.
- Spouse(s): B. Brian Blair (m. 1980) Doug Somers
- Partner: Ted DiBiase
- Children: 2
- Father: Leroy McGuirk

Michelle Kathleen McGuirk (born March 16, 1955) is an American professional wrestling personality, best known as a ring announcer for the World Wrestling Federation (WWF) from 1986 through 1994. She is the daughter of professional wrestler Leroy McGuirk.

== Professional wrestling career ==
Michelle McGuirk grew up in the wrestling business. Her father Leroy McGuirk ran wrestling promotions in the Midwest up to the early to mid-1980s. Leroy never wanted his daughter to follow in his footsteps and become a wrestler. After her father had left the business, she provided the World Wrestling Federation (WWF) with wrestling rings whenever they ran shows in her area. She also did some timekeeping. She announced her first show on September 12, 1986 at the Mid-South Coliseum.

McGuirk's television debut was in April 1987 on WWF Wrestling Challenge. From her debut, she was the object of ridicule from heel commentator/manager Bobby "The Brain" Heenan (though backstage they in fact got on well with each other). McGuirk also did commentary, often with Bruce Prichard (better known as "Brother Love"), and "The Duke of Dorchester" Pete Doherty. McGuirk was known for the colorful, glittery tuxedos she wore while announcing.

She performed color commentary on the Best of the WWF Volume 15, and did commentary on the WWF TV show All-American Wrestling. Her commentary as well as ring announcing was also seen/heard during episodes of Prime Time Wrestling which was co-hosted by Heenan and Gorilla Monsoon.

When not ring announcing or commentating, McGuirk's job was producing promos back stage. She explained in an interview that Vince McMahon would not let his employees just sit around back stage, he would always find something for them to do while being paid.

McGuirk was featured as the ring announcer in the coin-operated WrestleFest video game released by Technos in 1991. McGuirk left the WWF in 1994, rumored to be because she refused sexual advances made upon her by Vince McMahon. McGuirk later denied this rumor, stating that she left because of the increasing use of steroids backstage and because she did not want to move her family to Connecticut.

In October 2004, she appeared at Wrestling Reunion II in New Jersey and also repeated her performance for an Indianapolis, Indiana show. In May 2010, she made an appearance at the Legends of the Ring convention. McGuirk was inducted into the IHWE Hall of Fame of Wrestling along with her father, LeRoy McGuirk for their contribution to the sport of professional wrestling in June 2015.

In October 2019, it was announced that McGuirk would be inducted into the New England Pro Wrestling Hall Of Fame Class Of 2020 on July 17 in Warwick, Rhode Island.

== Personal life ==
McGuirk was once married to Brian Blair of The Killer Bees. The pair later divorced and she married wrestler Doug Somers, a marriage which also resulted in divorce. She also had a relationship with wrestler Ted DiBiase. She has two children, Priscilla and Max. Her son Max has worked as a professional wrestler.

She first acquired her real estate license in 1983. After leaving the professional wrestling industry, she began working as a real estate agent. She has also worked in politics and is a member of the Republican party. In addition, she was the secretary of three county commissioners and worked as a flight attendant.

== Awards and accomplishments ==
- New England Pro Wrestling Hall of Fame
  - Class of 2023
- Southern Wrestling Hall of Fame
  - Inductee (2015)
