= Steve Anthony (wrestler) =

American professional wrestler, trainer

Personal information
- Born: October 20, 1977 (age 48) Tampa, Florida, United States

Professional wrestling career
- Ring name: Steve Anthony
- Billed height: 5 ft 10 in (1.78 m)
- Billed weight: 190 lb (86 kg)
- Billed from: St. Louis, Missouri; Houma, Louisiana
- Trained by: Bob Armstrong; Harley Race; Scott Armstrong
- Debut: July 19, 2003

Steve Anthony (born October 20, 1977, in Tampa, Florida) is an American professional wrestler and trainer. Throughout his career, Anthony has competed for various promotions throughout the United States and Japan most notably Ring of Honor, World League Wrestling, New Japan, Pro Wrestling Noah, and various National Wrestling Alliance member promotions. Within the NWA, Anthony is a former two-time NWA World Junior Heavyweight Champion, a title which he defended in both America and Japan.

== Professional Wrestling career ==
=== Early Career and World League Wrestling ===
In 1991, Anthony began training in professional wrestling in Florida at the age of 13. He came under the tutelage of "Bullet" Bob & Scott Armstrong and began competing in wrestling bouts at 15. In 2003, Anthony made his professional debut with NWA Wildside, thus beginning a long working relationship with the National Wrestling Alliance. He would continue to wrestle almost exclusively for NWA Wildside throughout 2003 and began competing for MCW Pro Wrestling in 2004, reaching the finals of the 5th annual Shamrock Cup. Between 2004 and 2005, Anthony worked for various promotions throughout the Southern USA and Maryland, and in 2006, he debuted for Harley Race's World League Wrestling where he became WLW Heavyweight Champion on January 30, 2009.

=== Beginning of national and international excursions ===
Anthony continued to wrestle for promotions throughout the South in 2008, including for IWA Mid-South. In 2009, he began competing nationally and internationally, making his Ring of Honor debut in December 2008 along with competing on the June 30 edition of Monday Night Raw in a tag team match with Darin Waid against Cody Rhodes and Ted DiBiase Jr.

In September 2009 Anthony began his first tour of Japan, wrestling at 8 events for Pro Wrestling NOAH.

=== NJPW and NWA World Junior Heavyweight Champion ===
Anthony returned to the United States and continued to compete primarily throughout the South, becoming a mainstay with NWA Houston, Traditional Championship Wrestling, Vendetta Pro Wrestling and WildKat Pro Wrestling, while also continuing to compete in World League Wrestling. On April 13, 2015, Anthony won the NWA World Junior Heavyweight Championship, defeating Jyushin Thunder Liger in Las Vegas, Nevada. Anthony returned to Japan to defend the title in a rematch against Liger with New Japan Pro-Wrestling (NJPW). Anthony lost the title against Tiger Mask IV at NJPW Destruction 2015 on September 23. He continued to compete in Japan and the United States and in March, 2016, he recaptured the NWA Junior Heavyweight Championship in a rematch against Tiger Mask IV at NJPW Road to Invasion Attack 2016 - Day 1. As of 2017 Anthony continued to wrestle for World League Wrestling in Missouri. In 2017, he also began wrestling for VIP Wrestling in Dallas, having already competed against Brian Cage, Shelton Benjamin and Tim Storm amongst others.

== Championships and accomplishments ==
- Bayou Independent Wrestling
  - BIW Southern Championship (2 times)
- Elite Championship Wrestling
  - Elite Heavyweight Championship (2 times)
  - 2012 Superstar of the Year
- National Wrestling Alliance
  - NWA World Junior Heavyweight Championship (2 times)
  - NWA Elite Heavyweight Championship (3 times)
  - NWA Lone Star Heavyweight Championship (1 time)
  - NWA Main Event Television Championship (1 time)
  - NWA Southern Tag Team Championship (with Scott Storm as S&S Express)
- WildKat Pro Wrestling
  - WildKat Heavyweight Championship (1 time)
- World League Wrestling
  - WLW Heavyweight Championship (1 time)
  - WLW Tag Team Championship (2 times) - with Marc Godeker (1) and Bao Nguyen (1)
