= Rocky Reynolds =

American professional wrestler

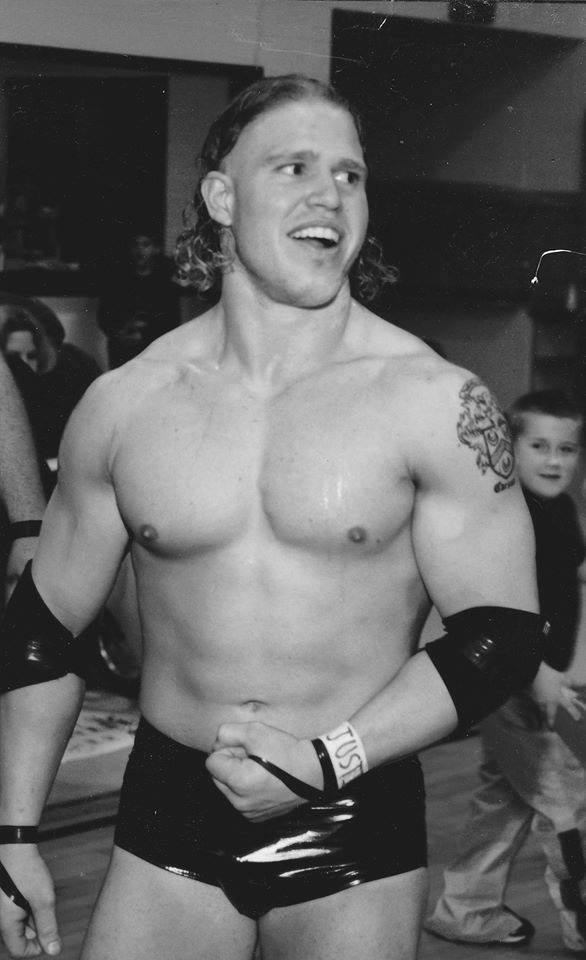

Personal information
- Born: Aaron Madden Titusville, Pennsylvania

Professional wrestling career
- Ring name(s): Rocky Reynolds; Aaron Madden
- Billed height: 5 ft 6 in (1.68 m)
- Billed weight: 215 lb (98 kg; 15.4 st)
- Billed from: Titusville, Pennsylvania
- Debut: 2000

Aaron Madden is an American professional wrestler who wrestled for the National Wrestling Alliance under the ring name Rocky Reynolds, where he is a former four-time NWA World Junior Heavyweight Champion.

== Professional wrestling career ==
=== National Wrestling Alliance (2000–2003) ===
Reynolds began competing for the National Wrestling Alliance in 2000. During his time in the NWA he became a four time NWA World Junior Heavyweight Champion competing in the NWA territories across Pennsylvania, West Virginia and Florida. On October 26, 2002, Reynolds teamed with A.J. Styles unsuccessfully challenging America's Most Wanted (Chris Harris and James Storm) for the NWA World Tag Team Championships On February 5, 2003, Reynolds wrestled for TNA when he teamed with longtime rival Jason Rumble to challenge America's Most Wanted (Chris Harris and James Storm) and lost when Storm pinned Reynolds.

=== Pro Wrestling Rampage (2007–2018) ===
On November 24, 2007, Reynolds made his debut for Pro Wrestling Rampage defeating Johnny Gargano. On May 14, 2010, Reynolds defeated Bill Collier to become the PWR Heavyweight Championship Four months later on September 11, Reynolds defeated John McChesney to win the PWR Lake Erie Championship along with unifying it with the PWR Heavyweight Championship.

=== Revenge Pro Wrestling (2018–2024) ===
Rocky Reynolds ended his in ring career with Revenge Pro Wrestling.

== Championships and accomplishments ==
- Allied Powers Wrestling Federation
  - APWF Cruiserweight Championship (1 time)
- National Wrestling Alliance
  - NWA World Junior Heavyweight Championship (4 times)
  - NWA Tri-State Heavyweight Championship (1 time)
- Pro Wrestling Rampage
  - PWR Heavyweight Championship (1 time)
  - PWR Lake Erie Championship (1 time)
  - PWR Tag Team Championship (3 times) – with Bennett Cole
  - PWR Wild Card Tag Team Championship (1 time) – with Bennett Cole
  - Pro Wrestling Rampage Hall of Fame
- Revenge Pro Wrestling
  - Revenge Pro Wrestling Hall of Fame
