= Starrcade '84: The Million Dollar Challenge =

1984 Jim Crockett Promotions closed-circuit television event

- Promotional poster featuring Dusty Rhodes, Ric Flair, Jimmy Valiant, Wahoo McDaniel, and Ricky Steamboat
- Promotion(s): National Wrestling Alliance; Jim Crockett Promotions
- Date: November 22, 1984
- City: Greensboro, North Carolina
- Venue: Greensboro Coliseum Complex
- Attendance: 16,000
- Tagline: The Million Dollar Challenge

Starrcade chronology
← Previous; 1983	Next → 1985

Starrcade '84: The Million Dollar Challenge was the second annual Starrcade professional wrestling closed-circuit television event that was produced by Jim Crockett Promotions (JCP) under the National Wrestling Alliance (NWA) banner. It took place on November 22, 1984, at the Greensboro Coliseum Complex in Greensboro, North Carolina. The main event of the show was billed as "the Million Dollar Challenge" as the storyline was that the winner of the match would not only win the NWA World Heavyweight Championship but also win a $1,000,000 purse, part of the illusion that professional wrestling was a legitimate sporting competition.

The main event saw champion "The Nature Boy" Ric Flair defend the NWA World Heavyweight Championship against long-time rival "The American Dream" Dusty Rhodes, with Joe Frazier as special guest referee. The show also saw championship matches for the NWA United States Championship, NWA World Television Championship, NWA Florida Heavyweight Championship, NWA Brass Knuckles Championship and NWA Mid-Atlantic Heavyweight Championship.

In 2014, the WWE Network in the USA included the previous Starrcades (1983–1986), which had been transmitted via closed-circuit television, alongside the rest of the Starrcades in the pay-per-view section.

== Production ==
=== Background ===
From the 1960s to the 1980s, it was tradition for the National Wrestling Alliance (NWA) member Jim Crockett Promotions (JCP) to hold major events on Thanksgiving and Christmas, often at the Greensboro Coliseum in Greensboro, North Carolina in the center of JCP's territory. In 1983, JCP created Starrcade as their supercard to continue the Thanksgiving tradition, bringing in wrestlers from other NWA affiliates and broadcasting the show through its territory on closed-circuit television. Starrcade soon became the flagship event of the year for JCP (later World Championship Wrestling, WCW), effectively their Super Bowl, featuring their most important storylines and championship matches. 1984's event was the second to use the Starrcade name.

=== Storylines ===
Starrcade featured wrestlers involved in pre-existing, scripted feuds, plots, and storylines. Wrestlers were portrayed as either heels (those that portray the "bad guys") or faces (the "good guy" characters) as they followed a series of tension-building events, culminating in a wrestling match.

== Event ==
Other on-screen personnel
Role:	Name:
Commentator	Bob Caudle
Commentator	Gordon Solie
Interviewer	Tony Schiavone
Referee	Earl Hebner
Referee	Sonny Fargo
Referee	Tommy Young
Referee	Joe Frazier (Flair vs. Rhodes match)
Ring announcer	Tom Miller

The opening bout was a singles match in which NWA World Junior Heavyweight Champion Mike Davis defended his title against Denny Brown. The match ended when Davis gave Brown a bridging belly-to-back suplex but Brown lifted his shoulder, pinning Davis to win the title.

The second bout was a singles match between Brian Adidis (Brian Adias) and Mr. Ito. Adias defeated Ito with an airplane spin.

The third bout was a singles match in which NWA Florida Heavyweight Champion Jesse Barr defended his title against Mike Graham. Barr pinned Graham with a roll-up to retain the title.

The fourth bout was a tag team elimination match pitting Assassin #1 and Buzz Tyler against the Zambuie Express (Elijah Akeem and Kareem Muhammed). After Akeem and Tyler were counted-out, Assassin #1 pinned Muhammad to win the match.

The fifth bout was a singles match in which NWA Brass Knuckles Champion Black Bart defended his title against Manny Fernandez. Fernandez pinned Bart with a roll-up to win the title.

The sixth bout was a tuxedo street fight loser leaves town match between Paul Jones and Jimmy Valiant. Jones defeated Valiant by pinfall after J. J. Dillon interfered.

The seventh bout was a singles match in which NWA Mid-Atlantic Heavyweight Champion Ron Bass defended his title against "Dirty" Dick Slater. Bass won the match when Slater was disqualified for pushing the referee.

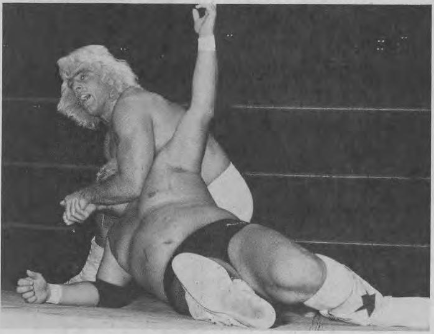
The main event of Starrcade '84 pitted Ric Flair (top) against Dusty Rhodes (bottom) (pictured in 1982).

The eighth bout was a tag team match pitting Ivan Koloff and Nikita Koloff against Ole Anderson and Keith Larson (substituting for Don Kernodle). The match ended when Ivan Koloff pinned Larson after hitting him with a chain. Following the match, the Koloffs attempted to beat down Larson, but were run off by Kernodle using his crutch.

The ninth bout was a singles match in which NWA Television Champion Tully Blanchard defended his title against Ricky Steamboat. The match ended when Blanchard hit Steamboat with brass knuckles then pinned him to retain the title.

The tenth bout was a singles match in which NWA United States Heavyweight Champion Wahoo McDaniel defended his title against Superstar Billy Graham. The match ended when McDaniel gave Graham a "Tomahawk Chop" and pinned him to retain the title.

The main event bout featured NWA World Heavyweight Champion Ric Flair defending his title against Dusty Rhodes, with Joe Frazier as special guest referee. In addition to the title, the winner of the bout would receive a $1,000,000 purse. The match ended when Frazier stopped the match due to a cut on Rhodes' forehead.

== Aftermath ==
The WWF national expansion was taking its toll on all the territories, including Jim Crockett Promotions. Several wrestlers expected to appear at the event left beforehand, including Barry Windham and Mike Rotunda, and early in 1985, Rick Steamboat left for the WWF after a dispute with booker Dusty Rhodes. All of them appeared at the first WrestleMania event, as well as on the Georgia Championship Wrestling program aired by the WWF on TBS.

Jim Crockett bought the WWF time slots on TBS along with Ole Anderson's "Championship Wrestling from Georgia (CWG)" promotion and took his time slot as well. As a result, JCP began to recognize CWG's National singles and tag team titles (the National TV title was retired), and discarded the Mid-Atlantic tag team titles held by Black Bart and Ron Bass.

Wahoo McDaniel held the United States Heavyweight title until March 1985, when he was defeated by Magnum T. A., who had just arrived from Bill Watts' Mid-South Wrestling. Magnum got into a feud with Tully Blanchard (and his "Perfect 10" Baby Doll) over the US title.

Buzz Tyler won the Mid-Atlantic Heavyweight title from Dick Slater in March 1985, but left JCP after a dispute with Dusty Rhodes and took the title belt with him. J.J. Dillon continued to manage Ron Bass and Black Bart, and added Buddy Landel to his stable during the year. Brian Adias returned to World Class Championship Wrestling after Starrcade.

Paul Jones and Jimmy Valiant continued their years-long feud after Valiant returned to JCP following his "loser leaves town" period beyond 1985.

Dusty Rhodes won the NWA TV title before it became the NWA World TV title after the purchase of CWG. After the buyout, Anderson turned heel and joined his storyline brother Arn Anderson after his arrival in JCP, helping Arn in his feud with Manny Fernandez, and then capturing the NWA National Tag Team Championship.

The Zambuie Express broke up in 1985. Kareem Muhammad spent a short time in CWG, then moved on to Championship Wrestling from Florida while Elijah Akeem resumed wrestling under his previous incarnation of "Bad Bad Leroy Brown", first in Japan and then in the UWF.

Ivan and Nikita Koloff regained the NWA World Tag Team titles from Rhodes and Fernandez, then Nikita Koloff feuded with Ric Flair over his NWA World Heavyweight title, leading to a title match at the first Great American Bash in July 1985.

After Don Kernodle's return from his (kayfabe) injury by the Koloffs he was moved to the undercard after the mass influx of new talent (Magnum T. A., Arn Anderson, Buddy Landel, Rock and Roll Express, Midnight Express) to JCP.

Assassin #1 left JCP after Starrcade and moved to CWG as a heel under the tutelage of Jimmy Hart before Hart left for the WWF; Assassin #1 left CWG after the buyout by Crockett.

== Results ==
No.	Results	Stipulations	Times
1	Denny Brown defeated Mike Davis (c) by pinfall	Singles match for the NWA World Junior Heavyweight Championship (Note: This was a disputed branch of the championship recognized by the promotion. The recognized NWA-wide champion was The Cobra, based in New Japan Pro Wrestling.)	5:38
2	Brian Adidis defeated Mr. Ito(ja)	Singles match	4:00
3	Jesse Barr (c) defeated Mike Graham by pinfall	Singles match for the NWA Florida Heavyweight Championship	11:43
4	Assassin #1 and Buzz Tyler defeated the Zambuie Express (Elijah Akeem and Kareem Muhammed) (with Paul Jones) by pinfall	Elimination match	5:26
5	Manny Fernandez defeated Black Bart (c) (with J. J. Dillon) by pinfall	Singles match for the NWA Brass Knuckles Championship	7:35
6	Paul Jones defeated Jimmy Valiant	Tuxedo street fight loser leaves town match	4:35
7	Ron Bass (c) (with J. J. Dillon) defeated "Dirty" Dick Slater by disqualification	Singles match for the NWA Mid-Atlantic Heavyweight Championship	9:12
8	Ivan Koloff and Nikita Koloff defeated Ole Anderson and Keith Larson (with Don Kernodle) by pinfall	Tag team match	15:28
9	Tully Blanchard (c) defeated Ricky Steamboat by pinfall	Singles match for the NWA Television Championship	13:17
10	Wahoo McDaniel (c) defeated Superstar Billy Graham by pinfall	Singles match for the NWA United States Heavyweight Championship	4:18
11	Ric Flair (c) defeated Dusty Rhodes by referee stoppage (Note: The referee stopped the match due to a cut on Rhodes's forehead.)	Singles match for the NWA World Heavyweight Championship with Joe Frazier as special guest referee	12:12
(c) / – the champion(s) heading into the match
