= Denny Brown =

American retired professional wrestler

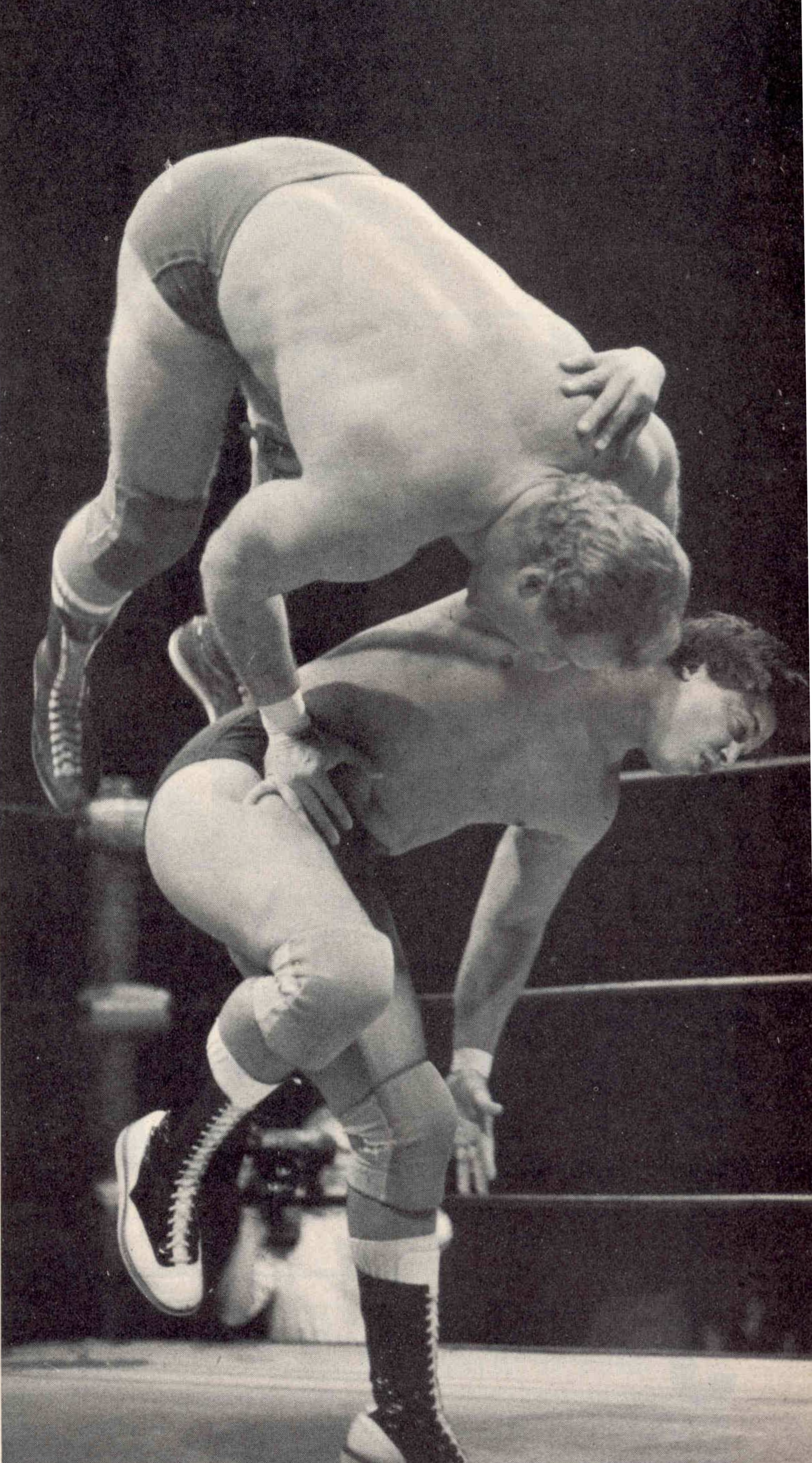
- Denny Brown (back) hiptosses Mike Davis (front), circa 1985

Personal information
- Born: Dennis Brown; January 9, 1956 (age 70) St. Petersburg, Florida, U.S.

Professional wrestling career
- Ring name(s): Bradford Brown; Dennis Brown; Denny Brown; Night Rider; Red Raider
- Billed height: 5 ft 11 in (180 cm)
- Billed weight: 224 lb (102 kg)
- Trained by: Rick Conners
- Debut: 1979
- Retired: 1997

Dennis Brown (born January 10, 1956) is an American retired professional wrestler, better known by his ring name, "Downtown" Denny Brown. He is best known for his appearances with the National Wrestling Alliance affiliates Championship Wrestling from Florida and Jim Crockett Promotions in the 1980s and with World Championship Wrestling in the 1990s.

== Early life ==
After serving in the United States Army, Brown attended welding school in St. Petersburg, Florida. After completing his training, he moved to Knoxville, Tennessee in search of work, but was rejected by the trade union due to not coming from Tennessee. His uncle introduced him to professional wrestler Rick Conners, who agreed to train him.

== Professional wrestling career ==
Brown debuted in 1979. In 1980, he began wrestling for Jim Crockett Promotions as "Downtown" Denny Brown. After wrestling as a jobber for several years, Brown won the NWA World Junior Heavyweight Championship at Starrcade in 1984 from Mike Davis. When New Japan Pro-Wrestling (NJPW) withdrew their separate claim to the title, Brown was recognized as the undisputed champion in August 1985. He held the title three times over the following months, feuding with Nelson Royal, Gary Royal, Steve Regal and Lazer Tron.

Later in his career, Brown wrestled in Florida Championship Wrestling (FCW) and as a jobber in World Championship Wrestling (WCW) before retiring in 1997.

== Championships and accomplishments ==
- Championship Wrestling from Florida
  - NWA Florida Junior Heavyweight Championship (1 time)
- Georgia Championship Wrestling
  - NWA World Junior Heavyweight Championship (1 time)
- International Wrestling Association of Japan
  - IWA World Junior Heavyweight Championship (1 time)
- Jim Crockett Promotions
  - NWA World Junior Heavyweight Championship (1 time)
- National Wrestling Alliance^{1}
  - NWA World Junior Heavyweight Championship (3 times)
- South Atlantic Pro Wrestling
  - SAPW Junior Heavyweight Championship (1 time)

^{1}NWA records are unclear as to where Brown was or what NWA affiliated promotion he was wrestling for when his first reign with the championship began.
