= Billy Goelz =

American professional wrestler

Personal information
- Born: William Charles Goelz; January 3, 1918 Chicago, Illinois, U.S.
- Died: November 20, 2002 (aged 84) Port Charlotte, Florida

Professional wrestling career
- Ring name(s): Billy Goelz; Sgt. Billy Goelz; Stan Pesek
- Billed weight: 190 lb (86 kg)
- Trained by: Lou Talaber

William Charles Goelz (January 3, 1918 – November 20, 2002) was an American professional wrestler, booker and trainer who was a prominent competitor in the National Wrestling Alliance throughout the 1940s, 50s and 60s. He held 16 championships throughout his career including two reigns as NWA World Junior Heavyweight Champion and had perhaps his most memorable feuds with Verne Gagne, Gypsy Joe, Al Williams, and Angelo Poffo father of "Macho Man" Randy Savage. Goelz (along with Walter Palmer) contended to be the inventor of the spinning toehold.

== Early life ==
Billy Goelz was born to parents LeRoy and Ann Goelz (née Lubner) in Chicago on January 3, 1918. He graduated from Senn High School In Chicago and embarked on a career in professional wrestling soon thereafter.

Before entering the professional ranks, Goelz was an amateur wrestler in the city parks system and began professionally wrestling as a teenager. Goelz joined the U.S. Army during World War II (1939–1945) and resumed his wrestling career thereafter.

== Professional wrestling career ==
Goelz's wrestling career lasted over 35 years. He competed throughout the Pacific Northwest and Texas territories and spent the majority of his career in Illinois. In these territories, he held several NWA championships, including the Midwest Tag Team, Junior Heavyweight and Heavyweight Championships. He was a two-time world champion in the NWA, having won the Junior-Heavyweight Championship twice in 1949, defeating Marshall Esteppe and Al William respectively. Goelz was a fan favourite and was popular among fans for his clean, technical style of wrestling.

In the later part of his career, Goelz became a prominent figure in the offices of promoter Fred Kohler, working as a trainer for upcoming wrestlers, booking matches and eventually owning part of the territory. He wrestled his last match in 1971. He was also the booker for Gypsy Joe.

== Later life and passing ==
A veteran of World War II, Goelz was a member of the American Legion in Fox Lake, Illinois. He was also a member of the American Association of Retired Persons and Teamsters local 301 in Waukegan, Illinois. Goelz and his wife, Ruth, had five children. He eventually moved to Corpus Christi, Texas with his daughter Gloria Childs and her husband Kent. There he trained, managed, and promoted pro wrestlers for the Texas territories, as well as training his two grandsons in the process. He continued his wrestling mentorship at the local level into his late 70's. After retiring for good in 1996, Billy spent time back home in the Chicago area close to family. He died at St Joseph's Hospital, Florida on November 20, 2002. e is buried in the Grass Lake Cemetery in Antioch, Illinois.

== Championships and accomplishments ==
- National Wrestling Alliance
  - NWA World Junior Heavyweight Championship (two times)
  - NWA Texas Junior Heavyweight Championship (one time)
  - Midwest Junior Heavyweight Championship (four times)
  - Midwest Heavyweight Championship (three times)
  - Midwest Tag Team Championship (two times)
  - Wisconsin Junior Heavyweight Championship
