= Larry Tillman =

American professional wrestler (1909–1997)

Personal information
- Born: Lawrence Robert Tillman; January 18, 1909 Springdale, Arkansas, U.S.
- Died: February 28, 1997 (aged 88)
- Spouse: Leota Byrd
- Children: 5

Professional wrestling career
- Ring name(s): El Relámpago; Larry Tillman; Tommy Gibbs
- Billed height: 5 ft 8 in (173 cm)
- Billed weight: 175 lb (79 kg)
- Debut: 1934
- Retired: 1951

Lawrence Robert Tillman (1909–1997) was an American professional wrestler and promoter. He competed throughout the United States and Canada, primarily within the National Wrestling Alliance territories, winning the NWA World Junior Heavyweight Championship in 1946, and promoted professional wrestling in Calgary, Canada.

== Professional wrestling career ==
Tillman was one of the first prominent wrestlers within the National Wrestling Alliance, competing from at least 1934 until 1950. During his in-ring career, he had memorable feuds with wrestlers including Freddie Blassie, Sonny Myers, Stu Hart, Ken Fenelon, Dan O'Connor and Marshall Esteppe, from whom he captured the NWA World Junior Heavyweight Championship on January 1, 1946 in Des Moines, Iowa.

During his career, Tillman also promoted wrestling bouts and events. At the fourth National Wrestling Alliance convention in September 1951, Tillman was granted NWA membership as a promoter for a territory spanning the U.S. Pacific Northwest to Western Canada. Canadian wrestler Stu Hart was one of the mainstays of Tillman's territory and would eventually work as a booker. In 1948, Stu had created Klondike Wrestling in Calgary and in 1951 Tillman sold his territory to Hart for $50,000 allowing him to take over NWA membership for Calgary. Hart would later rename the territory Big Time Wrestling, Wildcat Wrestling and eventually Stampede Wrestling.

== Championships and accomplishments ==
- National Wrestling Alliance
  - NWA World Junior Heavyweight Championship (1 time)
