= Joe McCarthy (wrestler) =

American professional wrestler (1929-2012)

Personal information
- Born: Joe Criswell; April 30, 1929 Obion County, Tennessee, United States
- Died: March 13, 2012 (aged 82) Dyersburg, Tennessee, United States
- Children: Joe Criswell Jr.

Professional wrestling career
- Ring name(s): Al Criswell; Joe McCarthy; Masked Mighty Yankee #1

Albert Joe Criswell (April 30, 1929 – March 13, 2012), better known as Joe McCarthy, was an American professional wrestler who competed in the 1950s and 1960s primarily throughout the National Wrestling Alliance (NWA) where he was a former NWA World Junior Heavyweight Champion. He was a prominent competitor for various NWA territories including Nick Gulas's NWA Mid-America and Leroy McGuirk's NWA Tri-State.

== Professional wrestling career ==
Criswell began his professional wrestling career in the early 1950s, competing primarily within Nick Gulas's NWA Mid-America territory. As Joe McCarthy, he headlined several events in 1954/1955, including tag team bouts with his partner Buddy Fuller. By the late 1950s, he was competing regularly throughout Ohio, North Carolina and Alabama. By 1960, McCarthy began capturing championship gold. On April 20, 1960, he teamed with the Great Bolo to defeat Bobby and Don Fields for both the Gulf Coast and Mid-America NWA Southern Tag Team Championships in Mobile, Alabama.

On April 9, 1963, McCarthy won the NWA Georgia Southeastern Heavyweight Championship. By this point, he had become a headliner for NWA Tri-State. On February 12, 1966, McCarthy defeated Lorenzo Parente to win the NWA World Junior Heavyweight Championship. He defended the title in the Southern United States before eventually losing it to Danny Hodge in Little Rock, Arkansas.

== Championships and accomplishments ==
- National Wrestling Alliance
  - NWA World Junior Heavyweight Championship
  - AWA Southern Tag Team Championship
  - NWA Georgia Southeastern Heavyweight Championship
  - NWA Southeastern Heavyweight Championship
  - NWA Mississippi Heavyweight Championship (2 times)
  - NWA Gulf Coast Tag Team Championship
