= Joe Lightfoot =

Canadian retired professional wrestler (born 1953)

Personal information
- Born: Joe Ventura; 1953 (age 72–73) Montreal, Quebec, Canada

Professional wrestling career
- Ring name(s): Joe Lightfoot; Joe Ventura; Joe Victory; José Ventura; Jos Ventura
- Billed height: 5 ft 8 in (173 cm)
- Billed weight: 220 lb (100 kg)
- Billed from: Quebec, Canada

Joe Ventura (born 1953) is a Canadian retired professional wrestler who was active throughout the 1970s and 80s. Although he is of Italian descent, Ventura had most of his success portraying an Indian (First Nation) under the ring name (Chief) Joe Lightfoot. He spent the majority of the 1970s competing in Canada for Stampede Wrestling and NWA All-Star Wrestling and the majority of the 1980s competing in the United States, primarily throughout the National Wrestling Alliance, where he is a former NWA World Junior Heavyweight Champion.

== Professional wrestling career ==
=== Stampede Wrestling and Canadian promotions (1970s) ===
Ventura began his professional wrestler career in the mid-1970s, wrestling in Calgary, Alberta and Regina, Saskatchewan primarily for Stu Hart's Stampede Wrestling. His older brother Tito Senza was also a wrestler. Having competed against wrestlers such as Keith Hart he made his way to Maple Leaf Wrestling in Toronto, Ontario, Canada, teaming with Steve Bolus on MLW television in a losing effort against Baron von Raschke and Greg Valentine on December 16, 1978. Throughout the remainder of the 1970s, Ventura competed for All-Star Wrestling and Stampede, feuding with wrestlers including Terry Sawyer, Dynamite Kid, Cuban Assassin and Roddy Piper. On March 1, 1977 he defeated Chin Lee to win his first title - the Grand Prix Wrestling Junior Heavyweight Championship. In April 1979, he won the NWA Canadian Tag Team Championship, teaming with Bobby Bass to defeat Igor Volkoff and The Mongol.

=== Pacific Northwest (1980) ===
On October 24, 1980 Ventura made his debut in the United States, wrestling for Pacific Northwest Wrestling in Eugene, Oregon under the ring name "Joe Lightfoot". Now portraying an Indian, Lightfoot became a mainstay in PNW, competing against Igor Volkoff, Buddy Rose and The Destroyer. He also became a regular tag team partner with Jay Youngblood, competing as "The Indians". The team proved a very popular babyface duo, winning the NWA Pacific Northwest Tag Team Championship October 25, 1980. The team also worked in Canada, winning the NWA Canadian Tag Team Championship on November 3, 1980, Lightfoot's second reign with the title.

=== NWA World Junior Heavyweight Champion & Puerto Rico (1981) ===
In 1981, Lightfoot travelled to Puerto Rico to work for the World Wrestling Council. Here he had great success as a babyface, becoming a prominent single's competitor. On November 7, 1981, Lightfoot won the WWC World Junior Heavyweight Championship, defeating Les Thornton. This was the second title he won from Thornton in as many months as he had captured the NWA World Junior Heavyweight Championship on October 16 in Knoxville, Tennessee.

=== Georgia Championship (1981–1982) ===
Lightfoot competed throughout the United States and Canada in the mid-1980s, wrestling primarily for Georgia Championship Wrestling, All-Star Wrestling in Vancouver, NWA Hollywood and PNW. He continued his successful tag-team with Jay Youngblood throughout the territories and were the most popular tag team in Pacific Northwest, where on February 27, 1981, they teamed with Andre the Giant in the main event to defeat Buddy Rose, Rip Oliver and The Destroyer in Oregon. He also had memorable rivalries with The Iron Sheik and The Moondogs in Georgia.

=== Florida, Central States and Jim Crockett Promotions (mid/late 1980s) ===
Lightfoot became a mainstay in Championship Wrestling From Florida from 1984 onwards. He formed a successful team with Mike Davis, competing in noted feuds with Black Bart & Kevin Sullivan and Hector & Chavo Guerrero. Lightfoot also began one of his most memorable rivalries with the One Man Gang, a feud which spanned both CWFF and Jim Crockett Promotions. They competed against each other in both singles and tag matches and also had a strap match on October 4, 1984 at the Sun Dome in Tampa, Florida. He worked his way through Jim Crockett Promotions and Central States Wrestling during this time, often teamed with other Native/Indian stars in tag team matches. He teamed with Billy Two Eagles win the NWA Central States Tag Team Championship in July 1986.

== Championships and accomplishments ==
- Central States Wrestling
  - NWA Central States Tag Team Championship (1 time)
- Grand Prix Wrestling
  - Grand Prix Junior Heavyweight Championship (1 time)
- National Wrestling Alliance
  - NWA World Junior Heavyweight Championship (1 time)
- NWA All-Star Wrestling
  - NWA Canadian Tag Team Championship (2 times) - with Bobby Bass (1) and Jay Youngblood (1)
- Pacific Northwest Wrestling
  - NWA Pacific Northwest Tag Team Championship (1 time)
- World Wrestling Council
  - WWC World Junior Heavyweight Championship (1 time)
