= Gus Kallio =

Finnish professional wrestler

- 1930 sports cartoon of Finnish professional wrestler Gus Kallio

Personal information
- Born: August Hassinen; May 17, 1891 Karttula, Finland
- Died: March 2, 1962 (aged 70) Monroe, Louisiana

Professional wrestling career
- Ring name(s): Gus Kallio; Gust Kallio
- Billed weight: 159.5 lb (72.3 kg)
- Trained by: "Farmer" Burns
- Debut: 1916

Gustav Kallio (May 17, 1891 – March 2, 1962) was a Finnish born professional wrestler known under the ring name Gus Kallio or Gust Kallio. Kallio's wrestling career peaked in the 1920s and 1930s where he was known as the "King of the Welterweights" and later on "King of the Middleweights" as he held multiple world titles in those two weight divisions.

== Biography ==
Gustav Kallio was born as August Hassinen in 1891 in Karttula, Finland. He immigrated to the United States with his brother Issac Hassinen in 1913 when both were in their early 20s. Issac moved on to Canada, while Gus stayed in the US wrestling under the name Gus Kallio.

=== Professional wrestling career ===
Kallio was about 15 years old when Kallio and his father attended a professional wrestling event that featured Billy Sandow, a successful middleweight wrestler that participated in Barnstorming tours. Seeing the success of the relatively small Sandow inspired Kallio to become a wrestler himself. Kallio made his debut in 1916 under the name "Gus Kallio" (some placed he was billed as "Gust Kallio") and began competing in the Welterweight division, a weight class with a top weight limit of 155 lb (70 kg). Kallio's conditioning earned him the nickname "the Finnish strong boy". On October 3, 1921, Kallio defeated Jack Reynolds to win the National Wrestling Association's World Welterweight Championship. Kallio retained the title through at least 1923, earning the nickname "the Welterweight King". During the 1920s Kallio often travelled around the United States, facing regional champions such as the Navy champion Jack Rich, Royal Van Dusen or Canadian Champion . On August 7, 1928, Kallio became the top Middleweight in the world, defeating Charlie Fisher to become the World Middleweight Champion in two and a half hour long match. Kallio later proved his incredible condition when he wrestled Henry Jones in a three-hour match before winning the bout.

In 1930 Kallio defeated both Ralph Parquat and Ray Carpenter, two of the top Middleweights in the United States to once again become recognized as the World Middleweight Champion. With his second reign as Middleweight champion he proved that he was "King of the Middleweights". In 1932 he lost, then regained the title from George Sauer making him a three time world champion. Each year the National Wrestling Association would meet and determine who was the recognized champion of their heavyweight, light heavyweight, and middleweight divisions. In 1933 the NWA confirmed that Gus Kallio was still the "king of the middleweights" and imposed a $500 bond for promoters wishing to book Kallio. Just like when he held the Welterweight title, Kallio travelled the United States facing local Middleweight competitors. In one match he lost to a wrestler who did not start out as his opponent. On April 16, 1935, Kallio wrestled against the Irish Middleweight Champion McBride, McBride had to be removed from the ring due to an injury after the first fall, which saw Nashville local Joe Gunther enter the ring and take McBride's place, defeating Kallio to win the title.

By the late 1930s Kallio was in his fifth reign as Middleweight champion but the lower weight divisions became less and less popular in the United States. By the late 1930s, the Middleweight division was mainly active in Mexico, which led to Gus Kallio touring Mexico with the title. In 1938 or 1939 Mexican promoter Salvador Lutteroth created a Mexican version of the World Middleweight Championship for his Empresa Mexicana de Lucha Libre (EMLL) and awarded the title to Kallio. Kallio defended and lost both the NWA and the Mexican version of the World Middleweight title to Octavio Gaona on February 19, 1939, which was the last time he would hold a wrestling championship. Gus Kallio was still an active wrestler as late as the early 1950s.

After his wrestling career ended, Gus Kallio ran wrestling/boxing arena (promptly named Gus Kallio Arena) promoting regular shows in Monroe, Louisiana for 20 years. He was also involved in operating a roller skate rink and Finnish-style steam baths (sauna). Gus Kallio sold his business interests after suffering a stroke in 1959. He died of self-inflicted gunshot wound on March 2, 1962, at his home.

== Championships and accomplishments ==
- Empresa Mexicana de Lucha Libre

- NWA World Middleweight Championship (2 times)

- National Wrestling Association

- World Middleweight Champion (5 times)
- World Welterweight Championship (1 time)
