= NWA Brass Knuckles Championship (Mid-Atlantic version) =

Professional wrestling championship

NWA Brass Knuckles Championship (Mid-Atlantic Version)

Details
- Promotion: Mid-Atlantic Championship Wrestling
- Date established: 1978
- Date retired: 1986
Statistics
- Longest reign: Ron Bass (343 days)

The Mid-Atlantic version of the NWA Brass Knuckles Championship was a short-lived championship that was defended sporadically and periodically in Jim Crockett, Jr.'s Mid-Atlantic Championship Wrestling. Created in 1978, the title was used in specialty matches in which the combatants would wear brass knuckles. The idea never really gained ground in the Mid-Atlantic territory and the title was permanently retired in 1986. There were other brass knuckles championships used in the NWA, such as in Texas and Florida, where the titles were more prominent and defended on a regular basis.

== Title history ==
Key
No.	Overall reign number
Reign	Reign number for the specific champion
Days	Number of days held

No.	Champion	Championship change			Reign statistics		Notes	Ref.
No.	Champion	Date	Event	Location	Reign	Days	Notes	Ref.
1	Ciclón Negro	July 1978		N/A	1			
Championship history is unrecorded from 1978 to 1980.
2	Bobby Duncum	1980		N/A	1		Duncum was billed as the champion upon his arrival in the territory.	
Championship history is unrecorded from 1980 to 1984.
3	Black Bart	1984	N/A	N/A	1		Black Bart was billed as the champion upon arrival	
Championship history is unrecorded from 1984 to November 22, 1984.
4	Manny Fernandez	November 22, 1984	Starrcade '84: The Million Dollar Challenge	Greensboro, North Carolina	1			
5	Black Bart	January 16, 1985		Raleigh, North Carolina	2			
6	Ron Bass	January 17, 1986		Richmond, Virginia	1		Defeated Black Bart for the vacated title	
—	Deactivated	December 26, 1986.	—	—	—	—		

== See also ==
- List of National Wrestling Alliance championships
