= Al Williams (wrestler) =

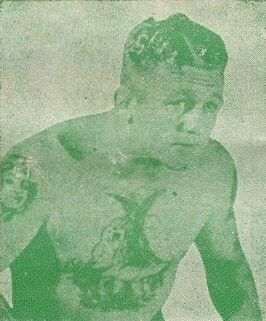

Professional wrestling career
- Ring name(s): Al Williams; Whitey Williams
- Debut: 1935
- Retired: 1976

Al Williams was an American professional wrestler. He was a prominent competitor of the early television era of professional wrestling, appearing on national telecasts for Fred Kohler's NWA Chicago territory. He held several titles throughout his career and was a former NWA World Junior Heavyweight Champion and NWA World Tag Team Champion.

== Professional wrestling career ==
=== Early career ===
Williams began his career in 1933 in Chicago wrestling at the Northwest Arena for NWA Chicago. The following year, he wrestled throughout the American South for territories including NWA Tri-State in Arkansas, Harry Light Wrestling Office in Detroit and Al Haft Sports in Ohio. Williams became a mainstay for these promotions during the 1930s. By the outbreak of World II in 1939, Williams had become a prominent feature in the Chicago territory.

=== USO plane crash ===
In 1945, he was a part of a USO wrestling tour in benefit of Allied troops in Europe. On March 3, 1945, the tour's plane crashed in France midway from England to Paris, resulting in the death of six wrestlers (George Mack, Jack Ross, Gerald "Kid" Chapman, Harold "Al" Sabath, Gaius W. Young and Ben Reuben) along with an additional ten inhabitants of the plane. It remains the largest loss of wrestling personnel life in a wreckage. For reasons unknown, Al Williams - the seventh member of the group - was not on board the flight and thus survived.

Williams returned to the United States soon after the tragedy and at the same month, headlined a Fred Kohler NWA Chicago event, the proceeds of which went to the children and widows of his colleagues who perished in the crash. All six wrestlers had been wrestling for Fred Kohler prior to the wreckage.

=== Television era and championship victories ===
In September 1945, Williams became the Midwest Junior Heavyweight Champion. He was a standout wrestler for the following decade in the NWA's junior heavyweight division, becoming the NWA World Junior Heavyweight Champion in August 1948 and having memorable feuds with wrestlers such as Billy Goelz.

During the 1940s and 50s, Williams was a prominent competitor in the early television era of professional wrestling, appearing on national telecasts for Fred Kohler's NWA Chicago territory. Heavily tattooed, he was an eye-catching feature-wrestler on programming broadcast out of the Marigold Garden. Alongside his success as a singles competitor he also wrestled in the Chicago territory and throughout the Midwest as part of a prominent "roughneck" tag team with Rudy Kay.

His in-ring career lasted until the mid-1970s, taking Williams throughout the United States and Canada. He wrestled his last recorded match while working for Vince McMahon's World Wide Wrestling Federation (now WWE) in a time limit draw against Pete Doherty in Albany, New York

== Championships and accomplishments ==
- National Wrestling Alliance
  - NWA World Junior Heavyweight Championship
  - NWA World Tag Team Championship (Indianapolis version) (2 times)
  - NWA Midwest Junior Heavyweight Championship
  - Rocky Mountain Heavyweight Championship (2 times)
  - Intermountain Junior Heavyweight Championship
