= Marshall Esteppe =

American wrestler

Personal information
- Born: March 1, 1909 Centralia, Missouri, United States
- Died: January 18, 1989 (aged 79) Columbia, Missouri, United States
- Spouse: Ruth Robinson Esteppe

Professional wrestling career
- Ring name(s): The Hooded; Marshall Carter; Marshall Estep; Marshall Estepp; Marshall Esteppe; The Masked Marvel
- Billed height: 5 ft 9 in (175 cm)
- Billed weight: 198 lb (90 kg)
- Billed from: Centralia, Missouri, United States
- Trained by: George Tragos; Lloyd Carter; Chris Jordan
- Debut: 1932
- Retired: 1953

Marshall Wallace Esteppe (March 1, 1909 - January 18, 1989) was an American amateur and professional wrestler. He wrestled primarily throughout the National Wrestling Alliance where he became a three-time World Junior Heavyweight Champion. Following his retirement from professional wrestling, Esteppe became wrestling coach at the University of Missouri. He coached four years voluntarily and is remembered by the university through their "Marshall Esteppe Most Outstanding Freshman" wrestler award, for his role in relaunching M.U.'s wrestling program.

== Biography ==
Esteppe was born March 1, 1909, to Bourbon and Mary Esteppe. He played basketball at Centralia High School and was a member of the 1926-27 team that finished 26-1. Following a successful high school wrestling tenure in the late 1920s,

Esteppe was invited to watch professional wrestlers George Tragos, Lloyd Carter and World Middleweight Champion Chris Jordan at Carter's Globe Hotel in Centralia. He would eventually join in the workouts, training under their tutelage. Carter arranged for Esteppe to compete in shoot matches at carnivals. He had his first professional bout, under the ring name Marshall Carter in 1933 and married his wife Ruth one year later. He would wrestle for the following 21 years, relocating several times throughout the United States. He won his first title by defeating Gus Kallios for the NWA Middleweight title in 1935 and went on to win the 175-pound title three years later by defeating Jesse James. In 1945 he again moved weight class and won the NWA World Junior Heavyweight Championship from Ken Fenelon in Des Moines, Iowa. Although he did not capture World Heavyweight Championship, he had notable victories over Heavyweight Champions Lou Thesz, Orville Brown, Leroy McGuirk and Ed "Strangler" Lewis. He retired in 1953, having wrestle approximately 3,000 matches throughout the USA.

Esteppe returned to wrestling in 1959, accepting a role as wrestling coach at the University of Missouri and playing a pivotal role in the re-creation of the college's wrestling programme, which had been discontinued in the mid-1930s. He coached four years without pay, starting the University of Missouri's journey to prominence in collegiate wrestling. He retired from this role in 1964. In his retirement, he became President of the Centralia Country Club and the club champion in 1956. He also became President of the Missouri Sand Greens Golf Association and continued to attend M.U. wrestling events until his passing in 1989. He is remembered by the University of Missouri through their "Marshall Esteppe Most Outstanding Freshman" wrestler award, for his role in relaunching M.U.'s wrestling program.

== Championships and accomplishments ==
=== Amateur wrestling ===
- Missouri high school state champion
- Head Coach, University of Missouri wrestling program

=== Professional wrestling ===
- Midwest Wrestling Association
  - MWA World Junior Heavyweight Championship (Missouri version) (2 times)
- National Wrestling Alliance
  - NWA World Junior Heavyweight Championship (3 times)
