= World Middleweight Championship (National Wrestling Association) =

Details
- Promotion: National Wrestling Association
- Date established: August 7, 1928
- Date retired: 1940
Statistics
- First champion: Gus Kallio
- Final champion: Tarzán López
- Most reigns: Gus Kallio (5 reigns[?])

The National Wrestling Association (NWA) World Middleweight Championship was a professional wrestling title sanctioned by the National Wrestling Association, an offshoot of the National Boxing Association (NBA). The title pre-dated the NWA by several decades, its earliest champion being recorded as Edwin Bibby in 1886, but was nonetheless recognized by the Association from 1928 through 1940, after which its lineage was adopted by EMLL in Mexico and retroactively connected to the National Wrestling Alliance's World Middleweight Championship. The title had a weight range of 155 lb (70 kg) to 160 lb (73 kg).

== Title history ==
Key
No.	Overall reign number
Reign	Reign number for the specific champion
Days	Number of days held
N/A	Unknown information
(NLT)	Championship change took place "no later than" the date listed

No.	Champion	Championship change			Reign statistics		Notes	Ref.
No.	Champion	Date	Event	Location	Reign	Days	Notes	Ref.
1	Gus Kallio	August 7, 1928	Live event	Chicago, Illinois	1	185	Defeated Charlie Fischer by decision after a 2.5 hour match; recognized by the National Wrestling Association on 28-08-11.	
2	Hugh Nichols	February 8, 1929	Live event	Cincinnati, Ohio	1	105		
3	Gus Kallio	May 24, 1929	Live event	Cincinnati, Ohio	2	392		
4	George Sauer	June 20, 1930	Live event	San Antonio, Texas	1	105	won as "the Masked Marvel".	
5	Gus Kallio	October 3, 1930	Live event	San Antonio, Texas	3	1,677		
6	Joe Gunther	May 7, 1935	Live event	Nashville, Tennessee	1	38		
7	Gus Kallio	May 14, 1935	Live event	Mobile, Alabama	4	1,315		
8	Octavio Gaona	January 19, 1939	Live event	Mexico City	1	381	Octavio Gaona won the championship to permanently establish it as an EMLL title. Often misreported as happening on 1939-02-19.	
9	Tarzán López	February 4, 1940	Live event	Mexico City	1	681	After this title change only the Mexican version remained active.	
