= Leroy McGuirk =

American wrestler and wrestling promoter (1910–1988)

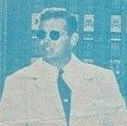

Personal information
- Born: Leroy Michael McGuirk; December 13, 1910 Garvin, Oklahoma, U.S.
- Died: September 9, 1988 (aged 77) Claremore, Oklahoma, U.S.
- Education: Oklahoma A&M College
- Children: Mike McGuirk
- Family: B. Brian Blair (ex-son-in-law); Doug Somers (ex-son-in-law)

Professional wrestling career
- Ring name(s): Leroy McGuirk; Mike McGuirk
- Billed height: 5 ft 11 in (1.80 m)
- Billed weight: 215 lb (98 kg)
- Debut: 1933
- Retired: 1950
- Sports career
Medal record
Collegiate Wrestling
Representing Oklahoma A&M
NCAA Championships
Gold medal – first place	1931 Providence	155 lb
Silver medal – second place	1932 Bloomington	174 lb

Leroy Michael McGuirk (December 13, 1910 – September 9, 1988) was an American amateur and professional wrestler, and wrestling promoter. He was involved in professional wrestling for more than fifty years. As one of the longest surviving members of the National Wrestling Alliance (NWA), he was affiliated with the organization from 1949 to 1982, where he was a one-time NWA World Junior Heavyweight Champion.

== Early life ==
He was born in Garvin, Oklahoma. He suffered the loss of his father before he was twelve and had to endure the loss of sight in one of his eyes due to a swimming mishap. McGuirk overcame many adversities to persevere in wrestling. He started wrestling at Tulsa Central High School in Tulsa, Oklahoma and competed at Oklahoma A&M from 1928 to 1932 under coach Edward C. Gallagher.

McGuirk would lose in the quarterfinals of the 1930 NCAA Tournament. He would bounce back the next year to claim the 155-pound title at the 1931 NCAA Tournament. A year later, McGuirk competed in the 1932 NCAA Tournament at 174-pounds, where he finished as the NCAA runner-up. He finished his collegiate career as a two-time NCAA All-American.

== Professional career ==
After graduation from college, McGuirk went to work for Sam Avey. On March 5, 1934, he beat Hugh Nichols in Tulsa for the NWA World Light Heavyweight Championship. He was also endorsed by the National Wrestling Association.

=== Championship runs ===
McGuirk enjoyed several runs as champion. On May 16, 1938, McGuirk beat Danny McShain to capture his second world light heavyweight title. The National Wrestling Association had a 190-pound title (later raised to 200) that was known as the World Junior Heavyweight Championship. McGuirk won this title on June 19, 1939, from John Swenski.

Between Tulsa and Hollywood, McGuirk dominated the Junior Heavyweight division, but at least three other Junior Heavyweight Champions were recognized at the time. On December 28, 1949, McGuirk unified the National Wrestling Association World Junior Heavyweight Championship with the National Wrestling Alliance's version by defeating Billy Goelz in Des Moines.

Leroy McGuirk is credited as the longest male single's champion of all time. He captured the National Wrestling Association World Junior Heavyweight Title on June 19, 1939, and had to vacate the title on July 2, 1950, for a title run of 3886 days (10yr-7m-19d).

=== Automobile accident ===
On February 7, 1950, McGuirk's career came to an end. In Little Rock, Arkansas, McGuirk was being driven to a restaurant by his wrestling pupil, Robert "Bob" Clay. In an attempt to prevent a collision, Clay locked the car's brakes, and McGuirk was thrown against the front windshield. McGuirk's tinted glasses were shattered and the side of the glasses covering his good eye were fractured, blinding McGuirk permanently. This led to another Oklahoman, Danny Hodge, rising to prominence in the Junior Heavyweight field, and who by 1960, became the principal headliner for McGuirk.

=== Booking and promoting ===
After the accident, Avey kept McGuirk as a partner. McGuirk became second vice-president of the NWA from September 1950 to August 1956, and from August 1959 to August 1960. Between 1957 and 1958, McGuirk was made an honorary vice-president. One of McGuirk's first challenges as vice-president was to reconcile the promotional war that occurred between women's wrestling promoters Billy Wolfe and his ex-wife Mildred Burke. McGuirk aligned himself with Burke and hoped to resolve the dispute at the September 1953 NWA meeting in Chicago.

By 1953, McGuirk was the primary booker for the junior heavyweight champion, while coordinating talent from southwestern Missouri to Little Rock, across Oklahoma, and into parts of Texas. Despite being the booker, McGuirk also took on the opportunity to train promising wrestlers. One of his most promising was eventual NWA World Heavyweight Champion Dick Hutton. In the May 10, 1953 edition of the Tulsa Daily World, McGuirk said "He has a fine chance to get into the big money brackets. He has a lot to learn, but has the natural qualifications, and I won't be surprised at anything he may accomplish." Hutton did not disappoint, as he beat Lou Thesz on November 14, 1957, at Maple Leaf Gardens in Toronto.

Avey and McGuirk's actual territory covered most of Oklahoma and Arkansas. Said territory also included Joplin and Springfield, Missouri, Shreveport, Louisiana, plus Wichita Falls, and Tyler, Texas. On January 4, 1958, McGuirk took over the entire business after Avey retired. Avey left wrestling to concentrate on his role as senior vice president of the Farmers and Merchants State Bank. One of the biggest issues McGuirk faced was the tension that occurred due to sporadic visits by world champion Buddy Rogers in the early 1960s. Many felt that the bigger promoters were locked in for visits by Rogers while territories such as McGuirk's, Jim Crockett in Charlotte, Karl Sarpolis in Amarillo, and Cowboy Luttrall in Tampa, to name a few, were perceived as the non-essential territories.

==== Bill Watts ====
McGuirk had many people who worked for him as matchmaker: Leo Voss, Sam Menacker, Rip Tyler, Wayne Martin, and George Scott. Of all those people, "Cowboy" Bill Watts played a big part in McGuirk's promotion, both positively and negatively. His first real connection to McGuirk was in 1968, when McGuirk submitted the only vote in favor of passing the NWA Championship to him. McGuirk and Watts worked together to promote Oklahoma, Arkansas, Mississippi, and Louisiana in the late 1970s. On July 22, 1978, their joint promotion of a wrestling show at the Louisiana Superdome drew an estimated 31,000 fans and a gate of $140,000. A dispute between the two in August 1979 strained their friendship. While Watts incorporated Mid-South Sports Inc. and had agreements Jim Barnett, Eddie Graham, Fritz Von Erich, and Vincent J. McMahon that made the promotion thrive. McGuirk became desperate and hoped that George Scott would help keep the territory afloat.

On February 23, 1981, Watts filed documents to bring Mid-South to Tulsa. Matters worsened as seven wrestlers went on strike on August 21. Their grievance was that McGuirk had not paid them for the previous weeks work. Despite turning to Amarillo for wrestling talent, McGuirk saw the writing on the wall.

In 1982, McGuirk ceased operations and left the city open for Bill Watts and Mid-South Wrestling to take over. McGuirk's daughter, Michelle Kathleen, better known in wrestling as Mike McGuirk, married B. Brian Blair, a wrestler for Mid-South. Both eventually worked for the World Wrestling Federation: Blair as one half of the tag team The Killer Bees, and Mike McGuirk as an in-ring announcer.

== Honors ==
McGuirk was inducted into the Oklahoma Athletic Hall of Fame in 1977. He is also a member of the Wrestling Observer Newsletter Hall of Fame. Of his charitable work, McGuirk is best known for working with Ed Lewis. They were responsible for instituting the NWA "Leader Dogs for the Blind" annual charity function.

He died on September 9, 1988, in Claremore.

== Championships and accomplishments ==
- Central States Wrestling
  - NWA World Junior Heavyweight Championship (1 time)
- George Tragos/Lou Thesz Professional Wrestling Hall of Fame
  - Class of 2004
- National Wrestling Alliance
  - NWA Hall of Fame (2015)
- National Wrestling Association
  - NWA World Junior Heavyweight Championship (1 time)
  - NWA World Light Heavyweight Championship (3 times)
- Professional Wrestling Hall of Fame
  - Class of 2014
- Wrestling Observer Newsletter
  - Wrestling Observer Newsletter Hall of Fame (Class of 1996)
