= Ken Fenelon =

American professional wrestler

Personal information
- Born: Patrick Fenelon; February 26, 1909 Dubuque, Iowa, U.S.
- Died: August 8, 1972 (aged 63)

Professional wrestling career
- Ring name(s): Kay Fenelon; Ken Fenelen; Ken Fenelon
- Debut: 1931

Ken Fenelon (born Patrick Fenelon, 26 February 1909 - 8 August 1972) was an American professional wrestler, boxer, promoter and referee. He was the first NWA World Junior Heavyweight Champion and the first two-time holder of the title which he held for a total of 301 days.

== Early life and boxing ==
Fenelon was recognised in Dubuque, Iowa as an all-round athlete and accomplished boxer. He enjoyed music and also performed in the Dubuque Senior High School Band. It was during his time in high school that Fenelon developed an interest in professional wrestling.

In 1933, he was a boxing instructor at his local Young Men's Christian Association and also assisted with the Catholic Youth Organization (CYO) boxing program. As well as competing and training, Fenelon also promoted local boxing events and refereed bouts.

== Professional wrestling career ==
Fenelon's in-ring career in professional wrestling spanned from 1935-1950. He became the inaugural NWA World Junior Heavyweight champion in 1944 and held the title until May 1945 when he lost the championship to Marshall Esteppe in Toronto. He recaptured the title on March 11, 1946, when he defeated Larry Tillman in Des Moines, Iowa, becoming the first two-time holder of the championship.

A popular figure throughout the Iowa territory, Fenelon headlined many events. On August 13, 1944, he wrestled NWA World Heavyweight Champion (Iowa version) Orville Brown to a one-hour time limit draw. On October 28, 1942, Fenelon defeated Gene Bowman to capture the NWA Iowa State Heavyweight championship, a title he would hold on two occasions.

Having been the regional Junior-Heavyweight champion in the territory prior to being recognised as the undisputed champion by the NWA, Fenelon defeated Eddie Campbell in 1944 in Des Moines to unify Campbell's MWA World Junior Heavyweight title with Fenelon's regional World Junior Heavyweight title

Fenelon also promoted professional wrestling events, which he continued to do after retiring from in-ring competition. In 1939, he promoted an event headlined by Lord Patrick Lansdowne vs. Mike London. In 1950, he began promoting female wrestling matches.

== Personal life ==
Fenelon was a multifaceted sportsman. Along with wrestling and boxing, he also played hockey and was third baseman for a local semi-professional baseball called Kool Motors.

== Championships and accomplishments ==
- National Wrestling Alliance
  - NWA World Junior Heavyweight Championship (2 times, inaugural)
  - NWA Iowa Heavyweight Championship (2 times)
  - World Light Heavyweight Championship (Iowa/Nebraska-Version)
