= NWA World Junior Heavyweight Championship (Los Angeles version) =

Details
- Promotion: National Wrestling Association (Sanctioning body); NWA Los Angeles (1948 – 1952)
- Date established: April 20, 1936
- Date retired: May 25, 1952
Statistics
- First champion(s): Albion Britt
- Final champion(s): Danny McShain
- Most reigns: Billy Varga (3 times); Danny McShain (3 times)
- Longest reign: Leroy McGuirk (2,784 days)+
- Shortest reign: Red Berry (8 days)

The NWA World Junior Heavyweight Championship was a professional wrestling world championship and secondary title in the National Boxing/Wrestling Association that was for the lighter wrestlers. It started in 1936 and was unified with the National Wrestling Alliance's NWA World Junior Heavyweight Championship in 1952.

== Title history ==
Key

#	Order in reign history
Reign	The reign number for the specific set of wrestlers listed
Event	The event in which the title was won
—	Used for vacated reigns so as not to count it as an official reign
N/A	The information is not available or is unknown

=== Reigns ===
#	Wrestlers	Reign	Date	Days held	Location	Event	Notes	Ref.
1	Albion Britt	1	April 20, 1936	245	Hollywood, California	Live event	Britt defeated Ted Christy in a tournament final to become the first NWA Junior Heavyweight Champion. Subsequent title reigns are recognized by the National Wrestling Association.	
2	Dude Chick	1	December 21, 1936	623	Hollywood, California	Live event		
3	Sgt. Bob Kenaston	1	September 5, 1938	203	Hollywood, California	Live event		
4	John Swenski	1	March 27, 1939	84	Tulsa, Oklahoma	Live event		
5	Leroy McGuirk	1	June 19, 1939	(Note: The exact date on which the title was lost is not known, which means their title reign lasted between 2,784 and 3,084 days.)	Hollywood, California	Live event		
—	Vacated	—	1947	—	N/A	N/A	The championship is vacated in Los Angeles sometime after February 1947 and a 40-man tournament is held to crown a new champion. McGuirk, however, continues to be billed as champion in other territories.	
6	Billy Varga	1	September 29, 1947	56	Hollywood, California	Live event	Varga defeated Danny McShain in a tournament final to win the vacant championship.	
7	Martino Angelo	1	November 24, 1947	133	Hollywood, California	Live event		
8	Leo Wallick	1	April 5, 1948	30	Hollywood, California	Live event		
9	Gorilla Ramos	1	May 5, 1948	40	Bakersfield, California	Live event		
10	Maurice La Chapelle	1	June 14, 1948	21	Hollywood, California	Live event		
11	Danny McShain	1	July 5, 1948	42	Hollywood, California	Live event		
12	Billy Darnell	1	August 16, 1948	210	Hollywood, California	Live event		
13	Billy Varga	2	March 14, 1949	119	Hollywood, California	Live event		
14	Danny McShain	2	July 11, 1949	49	Hollywood, California	Live event		
15	Red Berry	1	August 29, 1949	8	Hollywood, California	Live event		
16	Johnny Demchuck	1	September 6, 1949	20	San Diego, California	Live event		
17	Sonny Myers	1	September 26, 1949	57	Hollywood, California	Live event		
18	Ivan Kalmikoff	1	November 22, 1949	57	San Diego, California	Live event	Kalmikoff defeats Danny McShain, who is billed as champion, at a January 4, 1950 title defence in Bakersfield, California.	
19	Billy Varga	3	January 18, 1950	44	Bakersfield, California	Live event		
20	Leo Garibaldi	1	March 3, 1950	87	Los Angeles, California	Live event		
21	Billy Varga	4	May 29, 1950	43	Hollywood, California	Live event		
21	Leo Garibaldi	2	July 11, 1950	42	San Diego, California	Live event		
22	Baron Michele Leone	1	August 22, 1950	310	San Diego, California	Live event		
23	Leo Garibaldi	3	June 28, 1951	97	Salt Lake City, Utah	Live event		
24	Red Berry	2	October 3, 1951	196	Los Angeles, California	Live event		
25	Rito Romero	1	April 16, 1952	39	Los Angeles, California	Live event		
26	Danny McShain	3	May 25, 1952	<1	Los Angeles, California	Live event	The championship is unified with the NWA World Junior Heavyweight Championship and ceases to exist.	
