= National Wrestling Association =

Early professional wrestling organization

National Wrestling Association of America
- Acronym: NWA
- Founded: September 16, 1930
- Defunct: September 1980
- Style: American wrestling
- Headquarters: New Orleans, Louisiana (home office)
- Parent: National Boxing Association

The National Wrestling Association (NWA) was an early professional wrestling sanctioning body created in 1930 by the National Boxing Association (NBA; now the World Boxing Association, WBA) as an attempt to create a governing body for professional wrestling in the United States. The group created a number of "World" level championships as an attempt to clear up the professional wrestling rankings which at the time saw a number of different championships promoted as the "true world champion". The National Wrestling Association's NWA World Heavyweight Championship was later considered part of the historical lineage of the National Wrestling Alliance's NWA World Heavyweight Championship when then National Wrestling Association champion Lou Thesz won the National Wrestling Alliance championship, folding the original championship into one title in 1949.

With the creation of the National Wrestling Alliance and Thesz winning the Alliance's world title, the National Wrestling Association would officially recognize the champions of the National Wrestling Alliance at their annual conventions but no longer promote their own separate championships. The governing body would continue to hold conventions through at least the 1960s and officially disband in September 1980 but had no significant impact on professional wrestling past 1949.

== History ==
In 1921 the National Boxing Association (NBA) was formed in New York City to help regulate and create order in the world of professional boxing in the United States. In January 1930 the NBA attempted to introduce the same sort of regulations and structure on professional wrestling, motivated by the fact that there were a multitude of "World Champions" all over the country, all claiming to be the top wrestler. The NBA required wrestlers who wanted to participate in the inaugural championship tournaments to post a bond, ranging from US$1,000 to US$5,000 in the heavyweight division, used to ensure their participation and their willingness to defend the championship against NBA designated challengers. In the heavyweight division Jim Londos and John Pesek posted the bonds and were set to fight each other but due to various political moves by the people behind Londos and Pesek the match itself did not take place. On September 13, 1930 the NBA founded the National Wrestling Association (NWA) to deal exclusively with professional wrestling while the NBA focused on Boxing. The NWA named Colonel Harry J. Landry the president and opened up their main office in New Orleans, Louisiana. After the formation of the NWA they finally decided to recognize Jim Londos, a move that was not popular with everyone, leading to NWA vice president Harry Davis resigning. The Association would held annual conventions where the various member states of the NWA would meet and vote on who should be the world champions in the various divisions, with Londos being recognized for several years.

in 1948 a number of wrestling promoters across the country decided to form the National Wrestling Alliance, a counterpart to the Association implementing a territory system amongst its Alliance members. The Alliance also consolidated the various "World Champions" in their territories, although unlike the Association the Alliance only regulated the NWA World Heavyweight Championship, allowing various territories to create their own versions of other "World titles," such as the NWA World Tag Team Championship, which were left to each territory to determine, leaving multiple World Tag Team champions across the country. In 1949 the Association's World Heavyweight Champion Lou Thesz was chosen by the Alliance to become their World Heavyweight Champion as well, after previous champion Orville Brown was forced to vacate the title after a car accident. On November 27, 1949 the Association version of the championship was abandoned, folded into the National Wrestling Alliance's World Heavyweight Championship to help clear up the world title picture. The Association also decided to fold the NWA World Junior Heavyweight Championship into the National Wrestling Alliance's World Junior Heavyweight Championship.

By 1950 the National Wrestling Association no longer promoted their own specific championships, instead choosing to recognize several of the National Wrestling Alliance championships, including the NWA World Light Heavyweight Championship, NWA World Middleweight Championship and the NWA World Welterweight Championship promoted by the Mexican Empresa Mexicana de Lucha Libre (EMLL) promotion. The Association continued to hold conventions through the 1960s, but by the end of the decade the National Wrestling Association existed in name only. The National Wrestling Association was officially abandoned in 1980.

== Championships ==
Championship name	Period of recognition	Notes
NWA World Heavyweight Championship	1930–1949	Folded into the National Wrestling Alliance's World Heavyweight Championship
NWA World Junior Heavyweight Championship	1936–1949	Folded into the Los Angeles version of the National Wrestling Alliance's World Junior Heavyweight Championship
NWA World Light Heavyweight Championship	1930–1960s	Folded into the National Wrestling Alliance's World Light Heavyweight Championship
NWA World Junior Light Heavyweight Championship	1937–1940	Weight class abandoned by the National Wrestling Association
NWA World Middleweight Championship	1930–1960s	Folded into the National Wrestling Alliance's World Middleweight Championship
NWA World Junior Middleweight Championship	1934	Weight class abandoned by the National Wrestling Association
NWA World Tag Team Championship	1939	Credited as wrestling's first world tag team championship Championship is later abandoned by the National Wrestling Association
NWA World Welterweight Championship	1930–1960s	Folded into the National Wrestling Alliance's World Welterweight Championship
