= 1936 in professional wrestling =

1936 in professional wrestling describes the year's events in the world of professional wrestling.

== List of notable promoters/promotions ==
These promoters and promotions held notable shows in 1936.

| Promoter/Promotion Name | Abbreviation |
|---|---|
| Ed Burke | Burke |
| Empresa Mexicana de Lucha Libre | EMLL |
| Fédération Française de Catch Professionnel | FFCP |
| George Tracey | Tracey |
| Jack Ganson | Ganon |
| Lou Daro | Daro |
| Paul Bowser | Bowser |

== Calendar of notable shows ==
| Date | Promotion(s) | Event | Location | Main event |
|---|---|---|---|---|
| January 22 | Daro | Vincent López vs. Gino Garibaldi | Los Angeles, California | Vincent López (c) defeated Gino Garibaldi in a Best 2-of-3 Falls match for the World Heavyweight Championship |
| January 27 | FFCP | European Heavyweight Championship Tournament | Paris, France | Henri Deglane defeated Kola Kwariani in a tournament final to become the inaugural European Heavyweight Champion |
| January 29 | Daro | Vincent López vs. Gino Garibaldi | Los Angeles, California | Vincent López (c) defeated Gino Garibaldi in a Best 2-of-3 Falls match for the World Heavyweight Championship |
| January 31 | Bowser | Danno O'Mahoney vs. Count Casimir Polowski | Boston, Massachusetts | Danno O'Mahony (c) defeated Count Casimir Polowski by disqualification in a Best 2-of-3 Falls match for the AWA World Heavyweight Championship |
| February 10 | FFCP | Dan Koloff vs. Kola Kwariani | Paris, France | Dan Koloff defeated Kola Kwariani |
| February 19 | Daro | Vincent López vs. George Calza | Los Angeles, California | Vincent López (c) defeated George Calza for the World Heavyweight Championship |
| February 28 | Bowser | Danno O'Mahoney vs. Yvon Robert | Boston, Massachusetts | Danno O'Mahoney (c) defeated Yvon Robert in a Best 2-of-3 Falls match for the NWA World Heavyweight Championship |
| April 1 | Daro | Vincent López vs. Man Mountain Dean | Los Angeles, California | Vincent López (c) defeated Man Mountain Dean for the World Heavyweight Championship |
| April 17 | Bowser | Danno O'Mahoney vs. Yvon Robert | Boston, Massachusetts | Danno O'Mahoney (c) vs. Yvon Robert in a Best 2-of-3 Falls match for the NWA World Heavyweight Championship ended in a time limit draw |
| June 23 | Bowser | Danno O'Mahoney vs. Yvon Robert | Boston, Massachusetts | Danno O'Mahoney (c) defeated Yvon Robert in a Best 2-of-3 Falls match for the NWA World Heavyweight Championship |
| July 16 | Ganson | Danno O'Mahoney vs. Yvon Robert | Montreal, Quebec | Yvon Robert defeated Danno O'Mahoney (c) in a Best 2-of-3 Falls match for the World Heavyweight Championship |
| August 19 | Daro | Vincent López vs. Dave Levin | Los Angeles, California | Dave Levin defeated Vincent López (c) for the World Heavyweight Championship |
| September 27 | EMLL | EMLL 3rd Anniversary Show | Mexico City, Mexico | Zimba Parka defeated Tuffy Klein in a singles match |
| September 30 | Daro | Dave Levin vs. Vincent López | Los Angeles, California | Vincent López defeated Dave Levin (c) for the World Heavyweight Championship |
| September 30 | Ganson | Yvon Robert vs. Cy Williams | Montreal, Quebec | Yvon Robert (c) defeated Cy Williams by disqualification in a Best 2-of-3 Falls match for the World Heavyweight Championship |
| December 15 | Burke-Tracey | George Zaharias vs. Eddie Newman | St. Louis, Missouri | George Zaharias defeated Eddie Newman |
(c) – denotes defending champion(s)

== Accomplishments and tournaments ==
| Accomplishment | Winner | Date won | Notes |
|---|---|---|---|
| European Heavyweight Championship Tournament | Ludwig Dose | N/A | |
| Berlin Tournament | Herbert Audersch | February | |
| Hamburg Tournament | Hans Schwarz Jr. | March 31 | |
| Madrid Tournament | Mike Brendel | April 4 | |
| Bilbao Tournament | Mike Brendel | April 26 | |
| Bremen Tournament | Hans Kämpfer | April 29 | |
| Konigsberg Tournament (Summer) | Bruno Mosig | May | |
| Hanover Tournament | Ludwig Dose | June 14 | |
| Barcelona World Heavyweight Championship Tournament | Władek Zbyszko? | July | |
| Gold Belt of Madrid Championship Tournament | Tarzan Vasco (Pablo Gardiazabal) | July | |
| Swiss Free-style Tournament | Herbert Audersch | September 15 | |
| Konigsberg Tournament (Winter) | Ludwig Dose | November | |
| Munich Tournament | Willi Müller | December 10 | |
| Swiss Tournament | Willi Muller | December 12 | |
| World Greco-Roman Heavyweight Championship Tournament | Hans Schwarz Jr. | December 21 | |

== Championship changes ==
=== AFW ===
AFW World Middleweight Championship
incoming champion - Henry Kolln
No title changes

=== AWA ===
AWA World Heavyweight Championship
incoming champion - Danno O'Mahoney
| Date | Winner | Event/Show | Note(s) |
| July 16 | Yvon Robert | Live event | |

=== CSAC ===
World Heavyweight Championship (California version)
incoming champion - Vincent Lopez
| Date | Winner | Event/Show | Note(s) |
| August 19 | Dave Levin | Live event | |
| September 30 | Vincent Lopez | Live event | |
| October 10 | Dave Levin | Live event | |

=== DWU ===
British Empire/Commonwealth Championship (New Zealand version)
incoming champion - Earl McCready
No title changes

New Zealand Heavyweight Championship
incoming champion - George Walker
No title changes

=== EMLL ===
Mexican National Heavyweight Championship
incoming champion - Francisco Aguayo
No title changes

Mexican National Middleweight Championship
incoming champion – Uncertain
No title changes

Mexican National Lightweight Championship
incoming champion – Jack O'Brien
No title changes

Mexican National Welterweight Championship
incoming champion – Mario Nuñez
| Date | Winner | Event/Show | Note(s) |
| Uncertain | Vacated | N/A | Vacated for undocumented reasons |
| March 11 | Tarzán López | EMLL show | |

=== GAC ===
World Heavyweight Championship (Texas version)
(Title created)
| Date | Winner | Event/Show | Note(s) |
| May 10 | Daniel Boone Savage | Live event | Awarded championship by the Texas State Athletic Commission after NWA World Heavyweight Champion Danno O'Mahoney fails to appear for a scheduled title defence against Juan Humberto in Galveston, Texas in February 1936. |

=== MWA ===
MWA World Heavyweight Championship
incoming champion - Everett Marshall
No title changes

MWA Light Heavyweight Championship
Incoming champion – Walter Roxey
| Date | Winner | Event/Show | Note(s) |
| January 1 | Great Mephisto | Live event | |
| January 27 | George Dussette | Live event | |
| July 6 | Billy Weidner | N/A | |

MWA Ohio Heavyweight Championship
Incoming champion – George McCloud
| Date | Winner | Event/Show | Note(s) |
| March 25 | Frank Sexton | Live event | |
| June 24 | George McCloud | Live event | |

=== NWA ===
NWA World Heavyweight Championship
Incoming champion – Danno O'Mahoney
| Date | Winner | Event/Show | Note(s) |
| N/A | Vacated | N/A | Vacated when the AWA ceased to recognize O'Mahoney as world champion. |
| October 8 | Dean Detton | N/A | Detton is declared the new world champion following victories over title claimants Ed "Strangler" Lewis, Ali Baba and Dave Levin earlier that year. |

NWA World Junior Heavyweight Championship
Incoming champion – New
| Date | Winner | Event/Show | Note(s) |
| April 20 | Albion Britt | NWA World Junior Heavyweight Championship Tournament | Defeated Ted Christy to become the inaugural champion. Ralph Hammonds, however, continues to be recognized as champion in Texas and Tennessee as late as April 1937. |
| December 21 | Dude Chick | | |

NWA World Light Heavyweight Championship
Incoming champion – Leroy McGuirk
| Date | Winner | Event/Show | Note(s) |
| December 14 | Bobby Chick | | |

NWA World Middleweight Championship
incoming champion - Gus Kallio
No title changes

NWA World Junior Middleweight Championship
incoming champion - Billy Thom
No title changes

NWA World Welterweight Championship
incoming champion - Jack Reynolds
No title changes

=== NYSAC ===
NYSAC World Heavyweight Championship
Incoming champion – Danno O'Mahoney
| Date | Winner | Event/Show | Note(s) |
| March 2 | Dick Shikat | Live event | The match was originally for the unified NWA World Heavyweight Championship. Due to the controversial finish, however, the AWA withdrew its support and continued to recognize O'Mahoney as its world champion. |
| April 24 | Ali Baba | Live event | |
| June 12 | Dave Levin | Live event | Won by disqualification; recognized by The Ring magazine as the "true world champion". Ali Baba continues to claim the title but loses to Everette Marshall on June 26, 1936 in Columbus, Ohio Levin also wins Los Angeles version, defeating Vincent Lopez on August 19, 1936 in Los Angeles. |
| September 28 | Dean Detton | Live event | Recognized by The Ring magazine as the "true world champion". Detton also defeated Ed "Strangler" Lewis in a title tournament final earlier in the year in Philadelphia. |

=== SFBO ===
Pacific Coast Heavyweight Championship (San Francisco version)
(Title created)
| Date | Winner | Event/Show | Note(s) |
| November 3 | Billy Hanson | Pacific Heavyweight Championship Tournament | Defeated Nick Lutze to become the inaugural champion. |

Pacific Coast Junior Heavyweight Championship (San Francisco version)
incoming champion - Pete Belcastro
No title changes

=== SPWA ===
SPWA Heavyweight Championship
incoming champion - Lofty Blomfield
No title changes

=== Stadiums Limited ===
British Empire/Commonwealth Heavyweight Championship (Australian version)
incoming champion - Douglas Clark
| Date | Winner | Event/Show | Note(s) |
| May 30 | Tom Lurich | Live event | |

Australian Heavyweight Championship
incoming champion - Tom Lurich
No title changes

Australian Middleweight Championship
incoming champion - Dick Cameron
| Date | Winner | Event/Show | Note(s) |
| May 30 | Sammy Rodgers | Live event | |

=== WAC ===
Pacific Coast Middleweight Championship
incoming champion - Del Kunkel
no title changes

=== Unknown ===
World championships

World Negro Heavyweight Championship
incoming champion - Jack Nelson
No title changes

Women's World Championship
incoming champion - Clara Mortenson
No title changes

Regional championships

Montana State Middleweight Championship
incoming champion - Billy Spendlove
| Date | Winner | Event/Show | Note(s) |
| March 18 | Bob Cummings | Live event | |

== Arts and entertainment ==
- June 5 – The Seattle Post-Intelligencer publishes an advertisement for White Owl Cigar featuring Gus Sonnenberg, Yvon Robert, Chief Little Wolf, and Ernie Dusek.

== Debuts ==
- Debut date uncertain:
  - Whipper Billy Watson

== Births ==
- Date of birth uncertain:
  - Eddie Morrow
- January 3 – Eddie Einhorn (died in 2016)
- January 13 – Buddy Colt (died in 2021)
- February 4 – Eddie Sharkey
- February 16 – Murray Weideman (died in 2021)
- March 1 – Ricky Hunter (died in 2022)
- March 11 – Pat Barrett (died in 2021)
- March 21 – Beverly Shade (died in 2023)
- April 13 – Dr. Wagner(died in 2004)
- April 26 – Escorpion 1
- April 29 – Beauregard (died in 2024)
- June 8 – Kathy Starr
- June 18 – Larry Hennig(died in 2018)
- June 25 – Halcón Suriano(died in 1993)
- June 28 – Cowboy Bob Kelly (died in 2014)
- July 5 – Wayne Bridges (died in 2020)
- August 20 – Irma González
- September 20 – Pepper Martin (died in 2022)
- October 5 – Black Gordman
- October 20 – Emile Dupre(died in 2023)
- November 2 – Archie Gouldie(died in 2016)
- November 10 – Paul LeDuc (died in 2026)
- December 18 – Malcolm Kirk(died in 1987)

== Deaths ==
- January 1 – Cowboy Russell (40)
- June – Steve Znoski (28)
- June 19 – Jim Browning (wrestler) (33)
- June 25 – Mike Romano (40)
