= John Katan =

Ukrainian-Canadian professional wrestler (1901–1968)

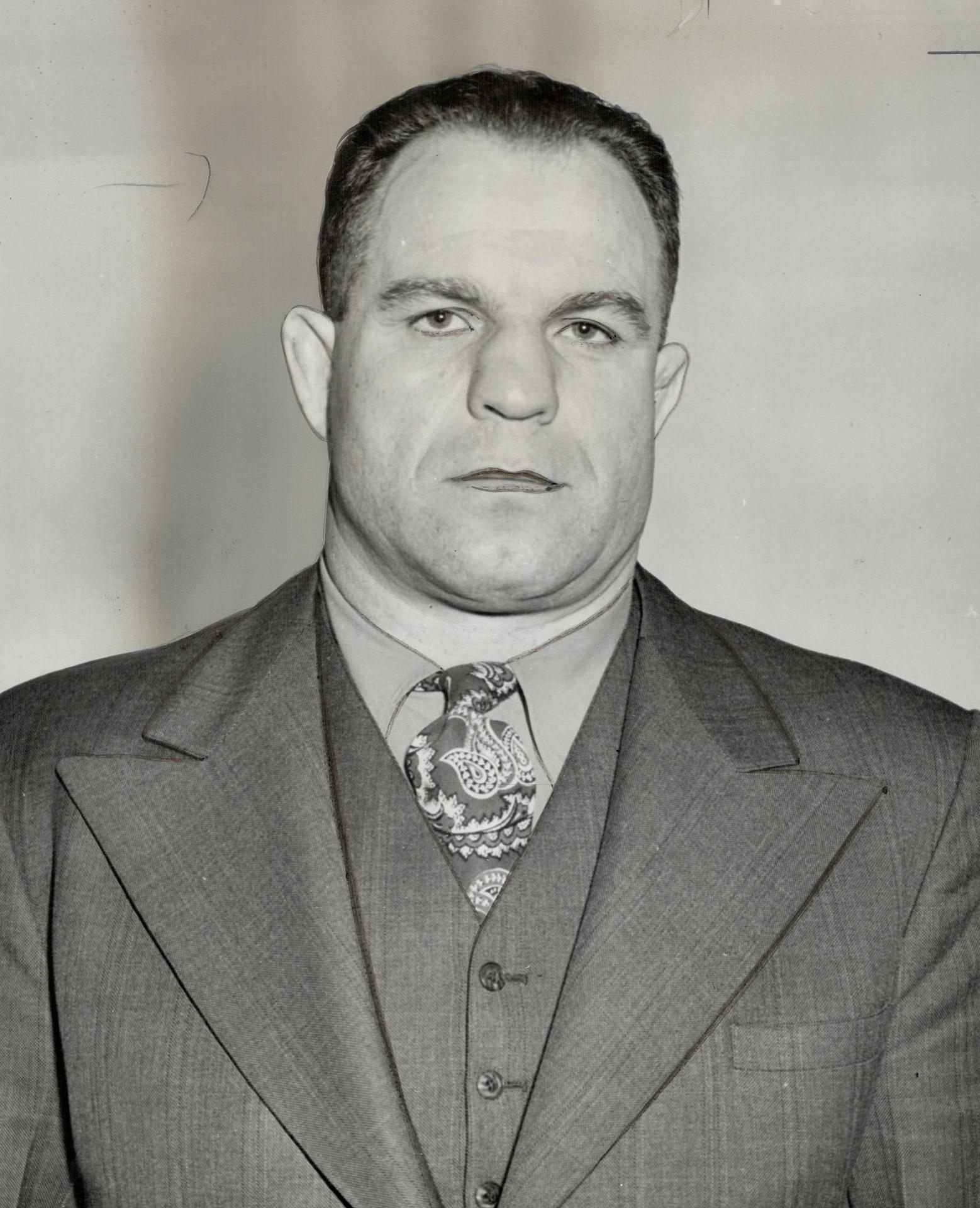

Personal information
- Born: July 12, 1901 Cherniwtsi, Austria-Hungary
- Died: March 9, 1968 (aged 66) Brantford, Ontario, Canada

Professional wrestling career
- Ring name(s): Honest John; Palermo Panther; Calgary Eyeopener; The Blue Mask; Blue Masked Devil; The Masked Marvel
- Billed height: 6 ft 1 in (1.85 m)
- Billed weight: 240 lb (110 kg; 17 st)
- Debut: July 1, 1928
- Retired: 1949

John Katan (July 12, 1901 – March 9, 1968) was a Ukrainian Canadian professional wrestler, trainer and promoter. A journeyman wrestler, Katan appeared throughout the world competing in nearly 6,000 matches during his 21-year career. Dubbed "Honest John", as well as the "Calgary Eyeopener" and "Palermo Panther", Katan was known for his great strength and won an estimated 90 percent of his bouts.

Katan was one of the first foreign wrestlers to compete in New Zealand's Dominion Wrestling Union and became one of the country's most popular stars along with fellow Canadians Earl McCready, George Walker and Roy McLarty. He defeated both McCready and Lofty Blomfield for the New Zealand-version of the NWA British Empire Championship in 1940. Katan was also regarded as one of the top stars in Canadian professional wrestling, especially his tenure in Maple Leaf Wrestling and International Wrestling Association, winning the Toronto version of the NWA British Empire Heavyweight Championship twice in 1942 and Montreal version of the World Heavyweight Championship in 1943. He went into semi-retirement after unsuccessfully challenging Whipper Billy Watson for the British Empire title in 1947 and worked with Frank Tunney as a promoter until leaving the business in 1958.

== Early life ==
Katan was born on July 12, 1901, in Cherniwtsi, Austria-Hungary (now Ukraine), and his family immigrated to Canada when he was 4 years old. Katan grew up in Lethbridge, Alberta and went to work in the local coal mines when he turned 17. He became known for his strength at an early age after shoveling 58,000 pounds of coal during an eight-hour shift. This set a new record in Western Canada and he was awarded $28.13 and a turkey. During this period, Katan worked out at the mine's sports club. He competed as an amateur for three years and went undefeated in 150 matches. During his amateur career, Katan held the middleweight, light-heavyweight and heavyweight championships of Western Canada.

== Professional wrestling career ==
=== Early career ===
On July 1, 1928, less than two weeks before his 27th birthday, Katan made his pro debut in Milk River, Alberta. His success as an amateur followed him in the professional ranks. Within four months, Katan was wrestling bouts against Canadian Heavyweight Champion Jack Taylor at the Majestic Theatre in Lethbridge, Alberta. The Red Deer Advocate reported that many wrestling fans believed Katan would be the next Canadian champion based on his performance against Taylor. By 1929, he was working in Ontario for Jack Corcoran's Queensbury Athletic Club. In the 1930s, Katan appeared for various promotions throughout Canada and the United States: American Wrestling Association, Al Haft Sports, Eastern Sports Enterprises, Great Lakes Athletic Club, Gulf Athletic Club, Jack Curley Promotions, Ray Fabiani Sports and Tom Packs Sports Enterprises.

Katan met Jim Londos, the reigning World Heavyweight Championship, for a two-out-of-three falls title match in Chattanooga, Tennessee on June 9, 1931. Six-thousand spectators turned out to Soldiers and Sailors Memorial Auditorium to see Londos retain his title. Katan was rendered unconscious for ten minutes following the first fall, but demanded the match be re-started when he regained consciousness. Police stepped in and stopped the fight when Londos put Katan in a headlock. The United Press International reported that Katan suffered a concussion.

On December 31, 1932, Everett Marshall was suspended by the National Wrestling Association after refusing to wrestle Katan. A previous bout between the two men earlier that month in Kansas City had ended in controversy and the Missouri State Athletic Commission ordered a rematch. The suspension was lifted on January 9, 1933, after Marshall agreed to another match with Katan.

While working for Jim Crockett Promotions during the mid-1930s, Katan headlined two of the biggest attended shows in the promotion's history. The first was in Richmond, Virginia against Jim Browning on January 17, 1936, a best two-out-of-three falls match with Katan losing via referee's decision when Browning injured his leg. This was followed by a bout against Dr. Len Hall on January 31, 1936, another best two-out-of-three falls match which Hall won in two straight falls. Both matches were held at the Richmond City Auditorium and were seen by a then record four-thousand fans.

=== Time in Australia and New Zealand ===
In 1935, American wrestling promoter Walter Miller took control of the Dominion Wrestling Union. As part of his efforts to develop professional wrestling in New Zealand, Miller brought over wrestlers from North America which were pitted against local stars. First approached by Miller in 1937, Katan took part in three tours to New Zealand and Australia in the late-1930s. He became one of the most popular stars in New Zealand during this period, along with other Canadian wrestlers such as Earl McCready, George Walker and Roy McLarty. Taking part in the 1939 wrestling season he arrived in Auckland on May 1, 1939, along with Jack Donovan, Roland Kirchemeyer, Mayes McClain and Dazzler Clark. They were later joined by McCready, Ted Cox, Ray Steele and Paul Jones. Katan was booked to face Lofty Blomfield during the first day of the tour.

Nicknamed "The Iron Man of the Ring" by the New Zealand press, Katan was billed as one of the top five wrestlers in the world by The Evening Post at one point. Katan defeated McCready for the DWU's NWA British Empire Championship in Wellington on July 8, 1940. Katan had wrestled McCready for the belt four times previously, resulting in a draw and three losses. He lost the title to Lofty Blomfield on August 7, but regained it at Auckland Town Hall a month later. Katan was defeated by McCready in Dunedin on September 24, 1940, ending his second title reign after only 15 days. Katan's tour was cut short with Canada's entry in World War II. Upon the Canadian government's declaration of war on Japan on December 7, 1941, Katan took the first available ship out of the country. He spent the three-week trip training the officers in hand-to-hand combat.

=== Return to Canada ===
Upon his return, the then 40-year-old Katan joined the war effort by visiting military bases with other wrestlers and staging exhibition bouts to entertain the soldiers. He also trained the Hamilton Police Service in hand-to-hand combat and was involved in coaching potential wrestlers for the Canadian Olympic wrestling team.

Katan also continued his pro wrestling career spending early 1941 in the Western Athletic Club before leaving the Pacific Northwest for Eastern Canada. Returning to Toronto, he took part in one of the earliest Steel Cage matches in Canada with Frank Marconi on September 28, 1942, in Hamilton, Ontario. Three days later, Katan ended the five-month reign of NWA British Empire Heavyweight Champion Whipper Billy Watson defeating him for the title on October 1, 1942. Katan lost the title to his old New Zealand rival Earl McCready on November 11, 1942, but won it back 9 weeks later. He was stripped of the title on January 28, 1943, after failing to appear for a scheduled title defense against Whipper Billy Watson. Watson was declared the new champion after defeating Nanjo Singh that same night. A rematch between the two men took place on February 25, 1943, which Katan lost. He subsequently moved on to the International Wrestling Association in Montreal. Katan briefly held the Quebec version of the World Heavyweight Championship, defeating Yvon Robert for the title at the Montreal Forum on April 15, but dropped it back to Robert after two weeks as champion. On one of Katan's last overseas tours, he defeated NWA British Empire Champion Earl McCready in Dunedin, New Zealand on May 28, 1946. As Katan had won on points, however, the title did not change hands.

== Retirement and later years ==
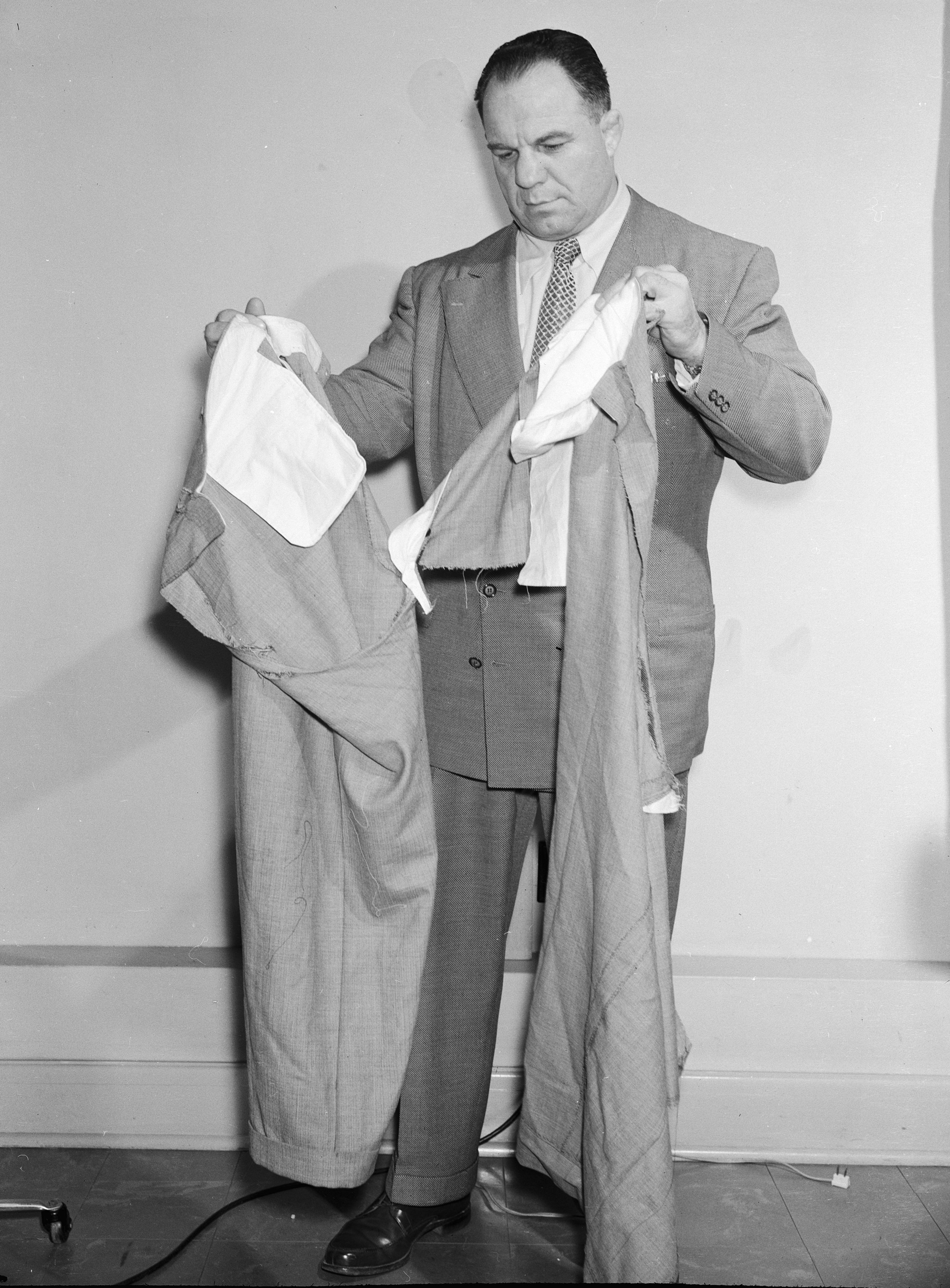
Katan shows what irate wrestling fans did to Steve Stanlee's trousers during a February 1953 show at the Kitchener Auditorium.

In 1947, Katan began promoting wrestling in Hamilton, Ontario. He continued wrestling for another two years but decided to retire as an in-ring competitor when managing both careers became too difficult. Katan worked closely with Frank Tunney and was responsible for convincing him to bring New Zealand wrestler Fred Atkins to Canada. Atkins became a longtime mainstay of Tunney's Maple Leaf Wrestling promotion, initially as one of its main "heel performers", as well as a manager, trainer and referee. During Katan's time as a booker-promoter, he enjoyed close friendships with a number of up-and-coming wrestlers. He helped train a number of future stars including, most notably, Billy Red Lyons. NWA World Heavyweight Champion Lou Thesz in particular, who faced Katan a number of times early in his career, praised his wrestling ability and strength.

In 1958, Katan sold his interests in Hamilton to Tunney and retired from pro wrestling. He bought the Ava Golf Club in Brantford, Ontario where he continued to live until his death on March 9, 1968, at age 66.

== Championships and accomplishments ==
=== Amateur wrestling ===
- Middleweight Championship of Western Canada
- Light-Heavyweight Championship of Western Canada
- Heavyweight Championship of Western Canada

=== Professional wrestling ===
- Dominion Wrestling Union
  - NWA British Empire/Commonwealth Championship (New Zealand version) (2 times)
- International Wrestling Association (Montreal)
  - IWA International Heavyweight Championship (1 time)
- Maple Leaf Wrestling
  - NWA British Empire Heavyweight Championship (Toronto version) (2 times)
