= Ike Robin =

New Zealand wrestler

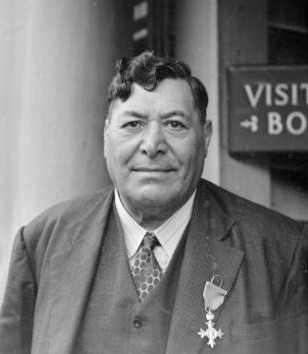
- Robin at an investiture ceremony at Government House, c. 3 October 1951

Personal information
- Born: 8 November 1886 Wairoa, New Zealand
- Died: 21 June 1968 (aged 81) Kohupatiki, New Zealand

Professional wrestling career
- Ring names: Ike Robin; Ihakara Rapuna
- Billed height: 6 ft 0 in (1.83 m)
- Billed weight: 117 kg (258 lb)
- Debut: 1924
- Retired: 1926

Ihakara Te Tuku Rapana MBE (8 November 1886 – 21 June 1968), commonly known as Ike Robin, was a New Zealand sportsman, businessman, orator and member for the Māori Anglican Church. A champion sheep shearer and professional wrestler, he was the first national heavyweight champion recognised by the National Wrestling Association and successfully defended the title against some of the top stars of the Gold Dust Trio-era, most notably, Stanislaus Zbyszko in 1926. Over 40 years after his death, he was ranked No. 7 in a top ten list of New Zealand's greatest wrestlers by Fight Times Magazine in 2009.

As a lay reader of the Anglican church he was closely associated with many prominent members of the clergy, such as Bishop Frederick Bennett, and other notable figures as Te Puea Herangi and Sir Turi Carroll. He was also an elder of the Ngāti Kahungunu and especially active in charity work and philanthropy on behalf of the Māori people. His efforts were recognized when he was appointed a Member of the Order of the British Empire.

== Early life ==
Ihakara Te Tuku Rapana was born in Wairoa, New Zealand, on 8 November 1886. He was the second of four children born to Ihakara Rapana, a member of the Ngāti Raukawa, and Riripeti Te Aue Roberts (or McRobert). His mother was of Scottish and Ngāti Kahungunu descent. Shortly after his birth, Robin's family moved to Kohupatiki where he lived for the rest of his life.

Although he received a primary education, Robin left school at age 15 to become a chauffeur and mechanic for Napier businessman George Donnelly. A year later, he joined his father as a shearer for the Chambers family at Te Mata station, then one of the biggest sheep stations in Hawke's Bay, as well as other various duties. He began shearing sheep at 20 years old and had a highest daily tally of 150 sheep in his first year. He increased this to 200 a year later and, in his third year, he achieved the title of 'gun-shearer' with a 300 tally. He increased this to 343. Robin eventually left Te Mata to find work for other shearing contractors and travelled as far as Wanganui and Turakina for employment. While at Mangaohane station in Taihape, he reached his highest personal tally, setting a record of 358 sheep in 8 hours 20 minutes. Robin also regularly competed in the Hawke's Bay Agricultural and Pastoral Society shows. In his best year in the competition, he won seven firsts, three seconds and one third in different shearing events.

Robin soon became a shearing contractor and his gangs were highly sought after by stations throughout Hawke's Bay, Wairarapa and Wellington. He eventually became the biggest contractor in Hawke's Bay and, at the peak of his success, Robin employed over 100 workers for both shearing and general farm work. He was able to offer work and accommodation to young homeless Māori, and worked with social welfare agencies in Napier and Hastings. The freezing works at Whakatu and Tomoana caused Robin's shearing contracts to decline as many of his men left his gang and chose to find work independently rather than as a contract worker.

== Entry into the Anglican church ==
Deeply religious, Robin became a lay reader in the Anglican church in 1911 and served in this position for nearly 60 years. He was a friend and close adviser to the first two Māori bishops appointed to the Anglican Church, and served under other prominent members of the Māori clergy. He was often called to deputise for ministers who were unexpectedly needed to perform other services. If a minister arrived late, the service was restarted upon his arrival. Robin would also host hourly evening services at his home. According to one popular story, Robin was once "so absorbed in his preaching that he failed to notice that the congregation comprised only his dog, Hui Toopu."

His personal contributions to the church are credited for the successful careers of many church hui. Robin regularly provided donations of meat, vegetables, transportation and other services to the Māori Anglican Church. He also accompanied his personal friend, Bishop Frederick Bennett, throughout New Zealand as a supporter of his ministry. As a foundation member of the Heretaunga Māori Choir, Robin also accompanied the group throughout the North Island where they regularly performed at the choral competitions accompanying major hui.

He attempted to enlist in the New Zealand Expeditionary Force during the First World War but, in spite of his physical prowess, was rejected by the New Zealand Army due to flat feet. This was one of the biggest disappointments in his life. He had two children with his first wife, Mata Kato, prior to her death in 1917; both children died in infancy. A year later, Robin married Mei Pere at Kohupatiki on 27 May 1918. Pere owned her own shearing gangs which working on the eastern coastal stations around Haumoana, Clifton and inland towards Taihape. They had five sons and one daughter together. Robin also had a son from an earlier relationship with Mare Hape, who was raised in Dannevirke, and had two adopted sons as well.

== Professional wrestling career ==
=== Athletic and amateur career ===
A noted sportsman as a young man, Robin was "a keen competitor at Caledonian sports days". At one competition in Napier he participated in the shot-put, hammer throw, caber toss, high jump, tug of war and two styles of wrestling. He won many of the events and collected £26 in prize money. He especially began to excel in wrestling and, after winning the North Island catch-as-catch-can wrestling championship at the Taihape Caledonian games on 24 January 1924, he decided to turn professional later that year.

=== New Zealand and Australasia champion ===
Robin, with his powerful strength and "wire and whipcord" build, was easily able to dominate his opponents. His earliest professional match was against the Indian wrestler M. A. Sunni at the Municipal Theatre in Napier on 3 May 1924, whom he defeated in two falls within 15 minutes. In August, he defeated the South Island champion and was from then on regarded as the best wrestler in all of New Zealand. Also during that year, Robin wrestled World Light Heavyweight Champion Walter Miller in the earliest-known outdoor wrestling match in New Zealand. The event, held by the Hawkes Bay Wrestling Association, attracted a crowd of 12,000 among whom included then Governor-General Sir Charles Furgusson. At the end of the season, Robin suffered a serious shoulder injury in a title defence against M. A. Sunni. The match lasted for two hours before scoring the pinfall at around midnight. Although he retained the title, and won the £1400 purse, doctors prohibited him from wrestling for at least one month.

On 16 March 1925, he defeated Sunni in two straight falls in Auckland to win the NWA New Zealand Heavyweight Championship, and a £750 purse, becoming the first champion officially recognised by the National Wrestling Alliance. Four months later, accompanied by former Scottish heavyweight champion and manager Alec Bain, Robin travelled to Australia with Sunni and Japanese wrestler Koraeda where he defended the national heavyweight title in a rematch against the Walter Miller. A side wager was made for £500. In October 1925, he defeated Walter on points in a six-round contest in Hastings for the NWA Australasian Heavyweight Championship. That year, he was also on the first wrestling event ever held in Brisbane Stadium where Robin defeated Peter Limutkin. He would successfully defend the national title against local and foreign wrestlers for over a year until his retirement in 1926.

Prior to his retirement, he defeated Clarence Weber in a Best 2 out of 3 Falls match for the NWA Australasian Heavyweight Championship in Melbourne. Upon returning to Napier, he was apparently awarded a gold medal in recognition of his victory. Robin became so popular in the country that a patented wire-strainer for fencing, the "Ike Grip", was named after him.

=== Bout with Stanislaus Zbyszko ===
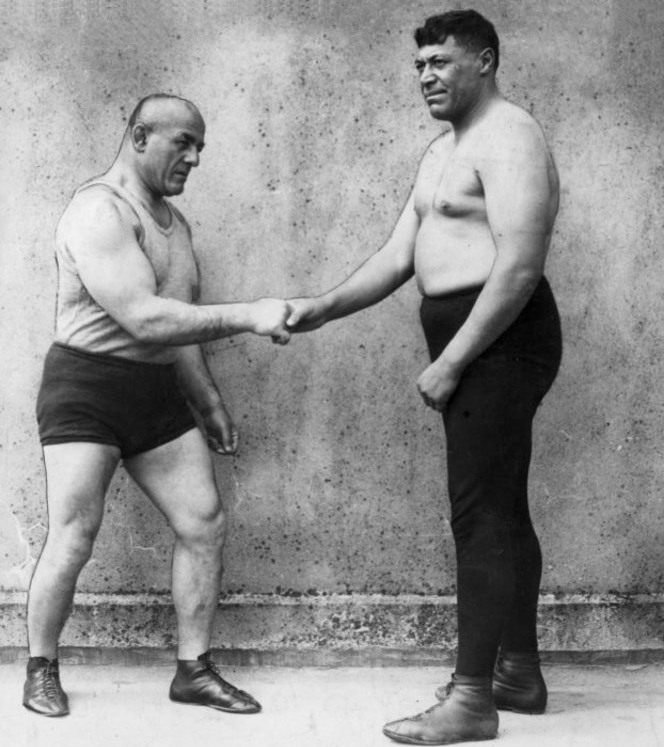
Robin and Stanislaus Zbyszko shake hands before their 1926 bout in Auckland.

In the final months of his career, Robin wrestled Polish-American wrestler Stanislaus Zbyszko at Auckland Town Hall on three occasions; over 1,000 people were turned away from the sold-out Town Hall during their bout on 22 June 1926. Although Zbyszko was billed as the World Heavyweight Champion, he had lost the title to Joe Stecher the previous year. According to one account by the New Zealand Railways Magazine, one of their matches lasted for several hours before ending in a time limit draw which had "gone on for many weary hours and when midnight Saturday chimed and Sunday commenced the match had to cease". Zbyszko later praised Robin's wrestling abilities claiming that few wrestlers could equal Robin for strength and that "with proper training for two months or so, he would be a world-beater".

=== Brief comeback and retirement ===
Robin chose to compete in his home country, however, because there were so few local professionals active at the time it was difficult to earn a living and he decided to retire. The national title would remain vacant for three years until Tom Alley won the title shortly before of the founding of the Dominion Wrestling Union. He briefly came out of retirement to compete for the Wellington Wrestling Association in 1930, refereeing some preliminary amateur bouts at the Wellington Town Hall, and visiting American wrestler Ed "Strangler" Lewis expressed interest in wrestling Robin for the NWA Australasian title. By 1932, Robin was in full training in preparation for a comeback and, after a six-year absence, had his first return bout against Finnish wrestler Peter Limutkin at the Wellington Town Hall on 18 July 1932. Although he was awarded the victory, Robin's in-ring performance was considered disappointing. The Evening Post noted "Against Peter Limutkin he did not show anything which would give hope of his performing creditably against a visiting wrestler approaching his own weight. Robin certainly won, but that was all, and the match can best be written down as just another effort on the part of the [Dominion] Wrestling Union to give a local man a chance to prove his worth".

As the season went on, his later bouts were more favourably reviewed. His 21 July match against younger Māori wrestler Toa Kaha, for example, went to the full four rounds amazing the audience "at the endurance shown by both Native giants". On 16 September 1932, Robin's match against Abe Kaplin went to a time limit draw and was called by The Evening Post as "one of the best wrestling matches seen at Hastings".

The following year he wrestled American wrestler Harry Mamos in Napier on 28 June 1933, which ended in a draw. Throughout the 1933 season, he challenged George Walker for the NWA New Zealand Heavyweight Championship and was considered a top contender for the title, along with Harry Mamos and Rumberg, by the end of the year. He and Billy Meeske were reportedly in line to challenge George Walker for the NWA British Empire/Commonwealth Championship during the summer of 1935.

The 49-year-old Robin, however, was now nearing middle age and in the midst of a changing business decided to retire. His nephew, Keita Meretana, also became a noted amateur and professional wrestler during the 1950s. Long after his retirement, wrestlers visiting from overseas would often stop by Robin's home to pay their respects. Over 40 years after his death, he was ranked No. 7 in a top ten list of New Zealand's greatest wrestlers by Fight Times Magazine in 2009.

== Later years ==
Robin returned to Anglican service following his retirement. He also became active in politics, being involved with the Labour Party, and corresponded with a number of government figures, including governors general and prime ministers, as well as president of New Zealand Māori Council Sir Turi Carroll, a close and lifelong friend. He was familiar with Māori leaders, such as Te Puea Herangi, and met with royalty as a representative of the Māori people of Hawke's Bay. His lifelong activities in charity work and philanthropy were partly influenced by Sir Āpirana Ngata and the Young Māori Party, and his hometown of Kohupatiki was described as "a home away from home for the boys of Te Aute College and the girls of Hukarere". His granddaughter, Maisie, was chosen as the model for the statue of Pania which now adorns Napier's Marine Parade. In the 1950 New Year Honours, Robin was appointed a Member of the Order of the British Empire for social welfare services to Māori, particularly in the Church of England sphere.

As an elder of the Ngāti Kahungunu, he frequently appeared as an orator at tribal ceremonial events throughout his life, even when afflicted by severe rheumatism and arthritis in his old age. His condition grew so severe that he eventually became bed-ridden and, on one occasion, had to be carried out of his home by one of his grandsons when his bedroom caught fire. Robin died at Kohupatiki on 21 June 1968, survived by his wife, three (or six) sons and a daughter. Following his death, the people of Kohupatiki honoured Robin with the song, Tuku whakarererere, in his name.

== Championships and accomplishments ==
  - Australasian Heavyweight Championship (1 time)
- National Wrestling Association
  - NWA Australasian Heavyweight Championship (2 times)
  - NWA New Zealand Heavyweight Championship (1 time, first)
