= Freely (disambiguation) =

Freely is a British free-to-air IPTV service.

Freely may also refer to:

- John Freely (1926–2017), American physicist and author
- Maureen Freely (born 1952), American novelist

== See also ==
- A. J. Freeley, New Zealand professional wrestler
- Ace Frehley (1951–2025), American musician
