= List of professional wrestling promotions in New Zealand =

This is a list of professional wrestling promotions in New Zealand and lists both active and defunct professional wrestling promotions.

== List ==
Name	Location	Owner(s)	Years active	Notes
Dominion Wrestling Union	Wellington	Walter Miller; Steve Rickard	1929–1961	
Impact Pro Wrestling	Auckland; Napier	Robert Eden; Michel Mulipola	2000–present	Started as Mania Pro Wrestling, company re-emerged as IPW early 2003. Previously associated with Australia's Major Impact Wrestling. Its weekly television show, IPW Ignition, was the first wrestling program to air in New Zealand since the 1980s.
New Zealand Wide Pro Wrestling	Petone; Wainuiomata	Martin Stirling	2003–present	Originally known as Wellington Pro Wrestling from 2003 to 2005. Presently inactive.
Southern Pro Wrestling	Invercargill	Troy Crosbie; Marc Perry	2015–present	
Capital Pro Wrestling	Wellington	Jay McLaughlan	2018–present	
River City Pro Wrestling	Whanganui	Ben Thorpe	2018–present	
Hughes Academy	Auckland	Graham Hughes	2014–present	
Valiant Pro	Wainuiomata	Hayden Thiele	2020–present	
Heathen Combat	Hamilton	Charlie Morgan	2019–present	
Unified Championship Wrestling	Christchurch		2017-present	
Aotearoa Wrestling	Auckland		2020-present	

== See also ==
- Professional wrestling in New Zealand
- List of professional wrestling promotions
