= Ray Hrstich =

New Zealand professional wrestler

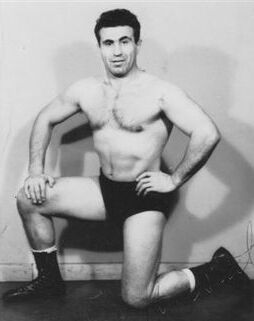
- Hrstich in the 1950s.

Personal information
- Born: Dick Hrstich; August 10, 1920 Drasnice, Croatia and Slavonia, Kingdom of Yugoslavia
- Died: February 12, 2000 (aged 79) Phoenix, Arizona, United States

Professional wrestling career
- Ring name(s): Dick Gordon; Dick Hrstich; Ray Gordon; Ray Hrstich
- Billed weight: 230 lb (104 kg)
- Billed from: Budapest, Hungary; Auckland, New Zealand
- Trained by: Anton Koolmann
- Debut: c. 1956
- Retired: c. 1970

Dick Hrstich (10 August 1920 – 12 February 2000) was a Yugoslavian/New Zealand professional wrestler, known by his ring names Ray Hrstich and Ray Gordon, who competed in the former Yugoslavia (his native country), New Zealand, Canada, and the United States during the late 1950s and 60s. He was among the first New Zealanders to travel to the US and, like his fellow countrymen Pat O'Connor and Abe Jacobs, became a major star with the National Wrestling Alliance during the Television-era.

He won the NWA New Zealand Heavyweight Championship in 1958 and, later in the US, held the NWA Central States Heavyweight Championship, NWA Iowa Heavyweight Championship, and the NWA Americas 6-Man Tag Team Championship with Apache Bull Ramos and Mike Riker. Hrstich is credited, along with Bobby Graham and "Killer" Buddy Austin, as the trainer of 8-time NWA World Heavyweight Champion Harley Race. In 2009, Fight Times Magazine ranked Hrstich No. 10 in a top ten list of New Zealand's greatest wrestlers.

== Professional career ==
=== Start with the Dominion Wrestling Union ===
Dick Hrstich was born in the former Yugoslavia, in the city now known as Drasnice, Croatia and emigrated with his family to New Zealand at a young age. He held an "outstanding record" as a champion amateur wrestler before turning pro during the mid-1950s. Trained by Anton Koolmann, Hrstich soon established himself as one of the country's up and coming stars. One of his most memorable bouts was against "The Zebra Kid" George Bollas and promoter Al Karasick speculated to the press that Hrstich would become a great drawing card. In April 1958, Wrestling Review wrote that Hrstich "appears to be another Lofty Blomfield". Two months later, on 11 June, he defeated Fred Wright in Christchurch for the then vacant NWA New Zealand Heavyweight Championship. Later that year, he travelled overseas to wrestle in NWA Hawaii and Stampede Wrestling; he lost to Stan Kowalski in Honolulu on 19 October and went to a draw with Reggie Parks in Edmonton, Alberta on 4 November 1958.

=== Moving to the United States ===
Hrstich returned to the US a year later, this time farther east in Kansas City, Kansas for Central States Wrestling, where he defeated "Butcher Boy" Lee Henning at Memorial Hall on 23 April 1959. While competing in the United States, Hrstich was billed as Dick or Ray Gordon, so as to make his name more easy for announcers to pronounce, and kept the ringname for the remainder of his career. In the fall of that year, in the American Wrestling Association, he faced such opponents as Jack Terry, Billy Goelz, Aldo Bogni, Don McClarty and Frank Townsend in the Minneapolis – Saint Paul area. On 24 October, he and Henning teamed together in a tag team match against Butch Levy & Bob Rasmussen in St. Paul. It was during this latest tour that Hrstich decided to wrestle in the US full-time and vacated the NWA New Zealand title.

Spending the rest of the year in Kansas City, Hrstich made several more appearances at Memorial Hall wrestling Stanley Lisowski and Chick Garibaldi in singles matches as well as taking part in a few tag team matches. On 19 November, he and Thor Hagen beat Chick Garibaldi & Kinji Shibuya and teamed with Tommy O’Toole in a 6-team championship tournament a month later. Other teams included Rip Hawk & Rock Hunter, Thor Hagen & Sonny Myers, Bob Geigel & Otto Von Krupp, Bill Cole & Chick Garibaldi, and Jerry Gordett & Joe Hamilton. On 10 December 1959, Hrstich and Krupp defeated Tarzan "Killer" Kowalski in a handicap match at Memorial Hall; Kowalski took the first fall, however Krupp was awarded the second when Kowalski was disqualified. During his time in central Missouri, he along with Bobby Graham and "Killer" Buddy Austin helped train Harley Race, a future 8-time NWA World Heavyweight Champion, while the young rookie was starting his career working for St. Joseph wrestling promoter Gust Karras.

Hrstich then headed south where he worked for Texas promoter Pat O’Dowdy in Odessa wrestling Ed Sharpe and Dick Hutton at the Floyd Gwin Auditorium in early 1960. In the Dallas-Fort Worth area, for promoters Morris Siegel and Ed McLemore, he also faced Paul "Butcher" Vachon, Marquis de Paree, Duke Keomuka, and Joe Pizza during October–November 1960. On 16 December 1961, he won the vacant NWA Iowa Heavyweight Championship in Cedar Rapids, Iowa. By 1962, Hrstich was back in the Central States territory and, on 9 February, he captured the NWA Central States Heavyweight Championship from Buddy Austin in St. Joseph. Hrstich held the title for two months before dropping the belt to his old rival Lee Henning on 5 May 1962.

=== Maple Leaf Wrestling ===
Hrstich left the area shortly afterwards to wrestle for Canadian promoter Frank Tunney's Toronto-based promotion Maple Leaf Wrestling and began appearing on events at its home arena, Maple Leaf Gardens, by the end of the month. In his first major appearance, on 24 May, Hrstich and Jim Hady wrestled The Tolos Brothers (Chris and John Tolos) to a 30-minute time limit draw. He also wrestled Steve Stanlee, Stan Stasiak and Jean Baillargeon during the next two months as well as facing his one-time tag team partner, Tommy O’Toole, beating him in both of their two encounters. One of his biggest matches was against Taro Sakuro, a bout which he lost, with 13,997 fans in attendance at the Maple Leaf Gardens on 30 August. In the following weeks, he also lost matches to Sweet Daddy Siki and Johnny Valentine, making his Toronto debut. His last appearance was on 11 October 1962, in which he lost to Taro Sakuro in a rematch. Hrstich met a number of rising NWA stars while working for Tunney, most notably, Bruno Sammartino.

=== Return to St. Louis ===
He spent the spring of 1963 wrestling for Sam Muchnick and appeared in televised matches on Wrestling at the Chase. His loss to Dick the Bruiser at the Kiel Auditorium, on 1 February 1963, signalled the start of Muchnick's "push" to make Bruiser one of the top stars in his promotion. Two months later, Hrstich met NWA World Heavyweight Champion Lou Thesz in St. Louis on 20 April 1963. Hrstich later travelled the road with Thesz and headlined together in tag team matches. He also had a brief stint in Jim Crockett Promotions that summer. On 25 July, he fought Pat O'Hara to a 20-minute time-limit draw in front of 3,437 fans at the Greensboro Coliseum. Nearly three weeks later, the two men teamed up against, and lost to, the Tolos Brothers in Lexington, North Carolina. Hrstich moved on to Georgia Championship Wrestling, then run by promoters Don McIntyre and Steve Manderson, where he and several other NWA stars including Lou Thesz, Eddie Graham, and The Mighty Hercules appeared for the next three months. In the first week of October, Hrstich defeated Felix Godo at the Municipal Auditorium in Atlanta, Georgia, wrestled Tarzan Tyler to a draw at the Fort Gordon Sports Arena and beat Marcus Godo at the William Bell Auditorium in Augusta. Hrstich wrestled The Mighty Hercules to a draw at that same venue the following week and scored victories over Hercules, Tyler, Ivan Zukoff, The Outlaw, Lenny Montana and Gene Anderson.

=== From Indianapolis to Florida ===
On 25 April 1964, Hrstich appeared at the Southside Armory in Indianapolis for Dick the Bruiser and Wilbur Snyder's first official World Wrestling Association show. He and Billy Goelz wrestled in the opening match and fought to a 20-minute draw. From late-1964 until early 1965, Hrstich wrestled for Championship Wrestling from Florida. One of his first matches in the territory was against Harry Smith in St. Petersburg on 20 November 1964. After a brief series of matches against Bill Dromo in March 1965, he finally left Florida for Don Owen in Portland, Oregon.

=== Pacific Northwest Wrestling ===
In his first two months in Pacific Northwest Wrestling, Hrstich feuded with Roy McClarty though both their matches resulted in draws; he and Stan Stasiak, however, did beat McClarty and Enrique Torres in a tag team match in Seattle four months later. On 14 June 1965, he beat Maurice "Mad Dog" Vachon via disqualification. That fall, he lost matches to Rick Hunter and Don Leo Jonathan. On 6 November 1965, Hrstich lost a tag team match with Sandor Kovacs against Bill Dromo & Ivan Kameroff in Winnipeg, Manitoba.

=== Tri-State Wrestling ===
Hrstich briefly returned to St. Louis where, on 7 January 1966, he and “Cowboy” Bob Ellis were beaten by Fritz Von Erich in a handicap match at the Kiel Auditorium before moving on to Tri-State Wrestling. Paired with Mike Clancy and The Great Bolo, Hrstich came out on the losing end in matches against The Assassins (Assassin #1 & Assassin #2). He fared better in the singles division with victories over Boris Managoff and Chuck Karbo and also made appearances for NWA Western States in Texas. Hrstich teamed with Nick Roberts and Kurt Von Steiger in a six-man tag team match against Jack Brisco, Don Kirk & Ricky Romero in Amarillo on 14 April. He would go on to have a series of matches with Brisco in Arkansas, Missouri, Oklahoma until the end of the year. He also faced Brisco in tag team matches as well; he and Don Kent wrestled Brisco & Ramon Torres to a draw in Springfield on 11 May, lost a six-man tag team match with Bob Orton and Chris Tolos to Brisco, Danny Hodge & Battleship Johnson in Tulsa on 31 October, and with Orton traded matches with Brisco and Hodge in Little Rock during the first week of November. In addition to the Tri-State territory, he was also among the many NWA veterans to pass through the Continental Wrestling Association during October–December 1966.

=== Later career and retirement ===
Hrstich spent some time in Arizona during the final years of his career and helped train Jody Arnold, the kayfabe nephew of Don Arnold, who became a major star in the region during the 1970s and 80s. Arnold later called Hrstich a "freak of nature" for being "amazingly strong for his size". According to Dale Pierce, an author and Arizona wrestling historian, he was one of the "toughest wrestlers to ever step into a ring".

Hrstich had one last championship run in Gene LeBell's NWA Hollywood Wrestling as one-third of the NWA Americas 6-Man Tag Team Champions with Apache Bull Ramos and Mike Riker until losing the titles to Mil Mascaras & NWA Americas Tag Team Champions Los Medicos in Los Angeles on 24 September 1969. He retired shortly afterwards and settled in Phoenix, Arizona. In 2009, wrestling columnist and historian Dave Cameron ranked Hrstich No. 10 in a top ten list of New Zealand's greatest wrestlers for Fight Times Magazine.

== Championships and accomplishments ==
- Dominion Wrestling Union
  - NWA New Zealand Heavyweight Championship (1 time)
- NWA Central States
  - NWA Central States Heavyweight Championship (1 time)
- NWA Hollywood Wrestling
  - NWA Americas Six-Man Tag Team Championship (1 time) – with Apache Bull Ramos and Mike Riker
- NWA Iowa
  - NWA Iowa Heavyweight Championship (1 time)
