= Harvey Parker (wrestler) =

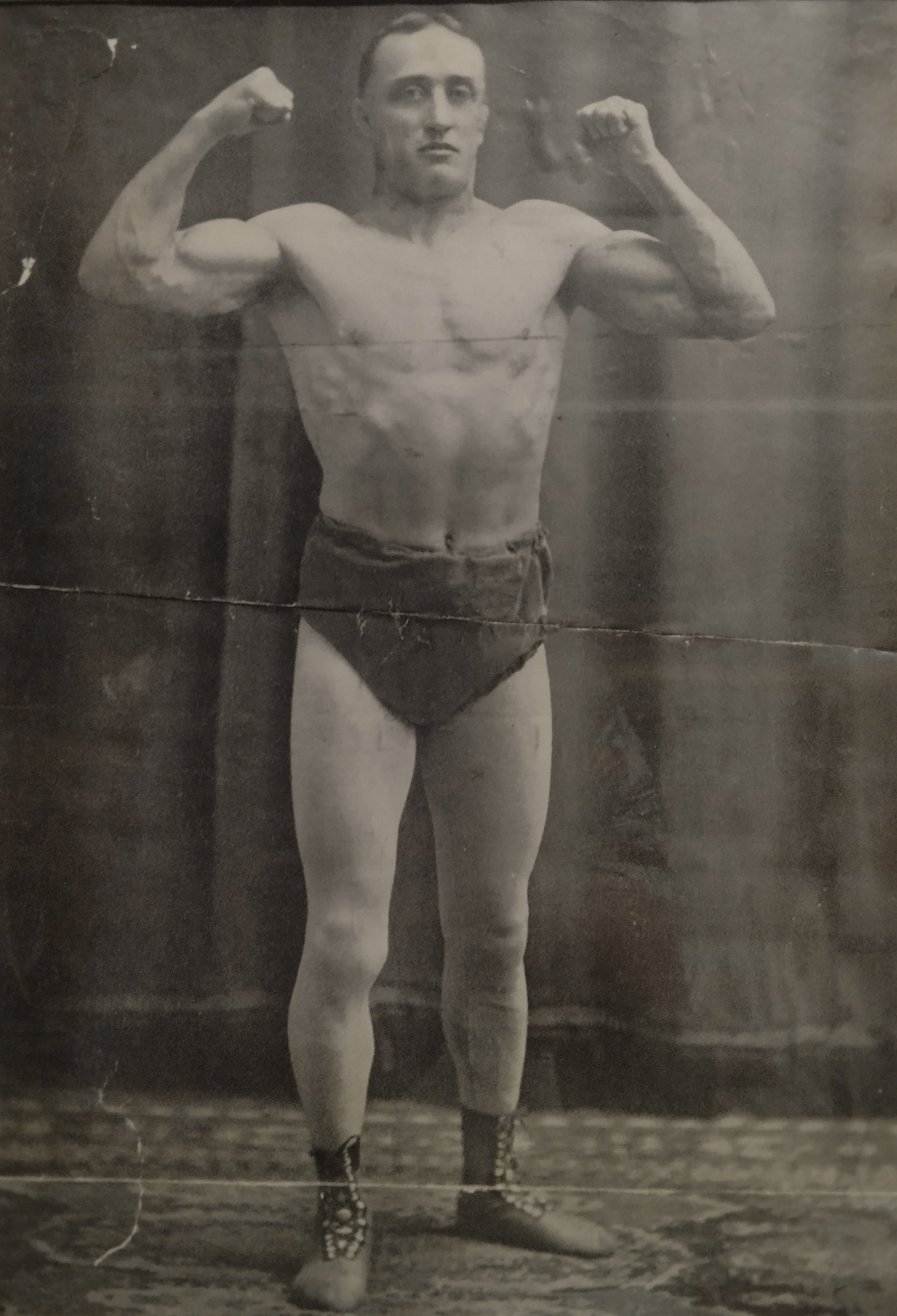

Harvey Parker, "The Little demon", was an American wrestler known for his fast paced and clever minded tactics in the ring. His long career spanning 26 years seen him wrestle the likes of "Bulldog" Clayton to George Bothner. Later in his career the former welterweight champion would shape the next generation of professional wrestlers.

== Early history ==
Howard Harvey Parker was born in Buffalo, New York, in 1863 at R.I Howard Stock Farm. Early in his life he became interested in wrestling and got brought into the business by professional wrestler and later promoter, Peter Schumacker. Having his first major wrestling match in 1881 against Tom "Bulldog" Clayton, Parker won by tossing the "mixed ale Englishman". On April 3, 1891, Alex Slater and Harvey Parker purchased a Salon from Ed Muldoon. The pair said their plans were to refurbish the building and dedicate a portion of the building to the installation of gymnasium in which he would teach athletics. The newspaper speculates Parker might move the Turkish bath parlors he owned in Eerie PA, to Youngstown Ohio with the idea of the business he could have there.

== Managing ==
On January 27, 1902, the fateful bout between Harvey Parker "Yankee Wonder" and emerging star Fred Beell took place in Marshfield, Massachusetts. This two-out-of-three-falls match resulted in Parker being choked out twice, losing the match. Parker was impressed with Beell's work, deciding to take Beell under his wing and asking him to tour the theater circuit across the country. Parker began to set up private money matches where betting was a constant. Beell later competing against legends such as George Hackenschmidt and being one of the few to have beaten Frank Gotch. Other wrestlers managed by Parker include Billy Nichols, Jack Butler of Brockton, and Clarence Bouldin "The Cuban Wonder". Parker's managing skills being with the display of Bouldin the newspaper says, "having taken to the burlesque stage, Parker has made The Cuban Wonder possibly recognizable locally."

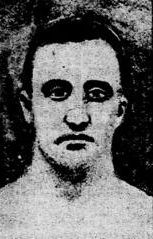
Harvey Parker

== Retirement ==
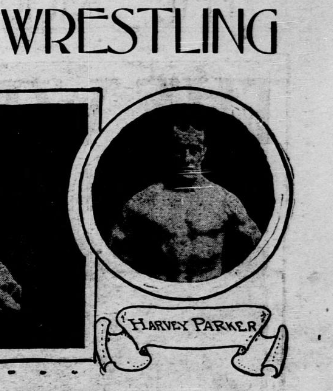

On March 23, 1906 the Waterbury Evening Democrat reports about a story from "a few days ago" in Toledo, Ohio, detailing Parker's retirement. His final match being between Sam Murbarger of Indianapolis. Parker having made Brockton, Massachusetts his home three years prior, he decided to buy a local drug store. Having retired Parker then would continue to have a few occasional matches up until 1907.
