= Kangaroo Kennedy =

Australian Wrestler

Personal information
- Born: Clyde Hurle; 6 March 1926 Newcastle, New South Wales, Australia
- Died: 19 November 2002 (aged 76) Gold Coast, Queensland

Professional wrestling career
- Ring name(s): Kangaroo Kennedy; Clive Kennedy
- Billed weight: 240lb (109kg)
- Trained by: Leo Jensen
- Debut: 1950s Newcastle, New South Wales
- Retired: 1969

Clyde Hurle (6 March 1926 – 19 November 2002) was an Australian professional wrestler best known as Kangaroo Kennedy. He had a gimmick which was his golden blond hair and a boomerang. He was a former Australian Heavyweight Champion, defeating Baron Von Heczy for the title on 14 April 1962, and NWA Australasian Heavyweight Champion.

== Championships and accomplishments ==
- NWA Australia
  - Australian Heavyweight Championship (1 time)
- Dominion Wrestling Union
  - NWA Australasian Heavyweight Championship (1 time)
