= World Light Heavyweight Championship (Australian version) =

Statistics
- First champion(s): Ted Thye
- Final champion(s): Clarence Eklund

The World Light Heavyweight Championship was one of the first Light Heavyweight professional wrestling championship in Australia.

== Title history ==
Wrestler:	Times:	Date won:	Location:	Notes:
Ted Thye	1	26/02/10	Columbus, OH	Defeats Clarence Eklund
Sam Clapham	1	1926	Sydney	
Ted Thye	2	27/08/20	West Melbourne, Victoria	
Clarence Eklund	1	28/11/20	Melbourne	Wins tournament to become the undisputed world light heavyweight champion, defeating Ted Thye in the final and Ad Santel in earlier round. declines invitation to participate in tournament sponsored by the National Boxing Association in 1930 and retires as champion in 1931

== See also ==
- Professional wrestling in Australia
- World Light Heavyweight Championship
- World Light Heavyweight Championship (National Wrestling Association)
