= Ken Kenneth =

New Zealand professional wrestler

- Trading card photo displayed at Brock University

Personal information
- Born: Kenneth Arthur Schischka; 11 June 1912 Glorit, Rodney, Auckland, New Zealand
- Died: 16 October 1994 (aged 82) Kaeo, Far North District, Northland, New Zealand

Professional wrestling career
- Ring name(s): Ken Kenneth; Ken Schischka; Public Enemy No.1
- Billed height: 6 ft 0 in (1.83 m)
- Billed weight: 240 lb (110 kg)
- Debut: 1947
- Retired: 1960

Kenneth Arthur Schischka (11 June 1912 – 16 October 1994), better known by his ring name Ken Kenneth, was a New Zealand professional wrestler.

== Championships and accomplishments ==
  - Australasian Heavyweight Championship (1 time)
- Dominion Wrestling Union
  - NWA Australasian Heavyweight Championship (1 time)
  - NWA New Zealand Heavyweight Championship (2 times)
- Maple Leaf Wrestling
  - NWA British Empire Championship (Toronto version) (1 time)
- National Wrestling Alliance
  - NWA Northwest Tag Team Championship (1 time) – with Tex McKenzie
- Salt Lake Wrestling Club
  - NWA Intermountain Tag Team Championship (1 time) – with Red Donovan
