= World Light Heavyweight Championship =

Statistics
- Final champion: Martin "Farmer" Burns
- Most reigns: Clarence Eklund

The World Light Heavyweight Championship was the first recognized professional wrestling world light heavyweight championship created in 1905.

== Title history ==
| Wrestler: | Times: | Date Won: | Location: | Notes: |
|---|---|---|---|---|
| Martin "Farmer" Burns | 1 | January 19, 1881 | New York City, New York | |
| Jack Dodd | 1 | August 7, 1882 | New York City, New York | |
| William Demetral | 1 | April 11, 1887 | Chicago, Illinois | |
| Yussif Hussane | 1 | April 20, 1895 | Chicago, Illinois | |
| William Demetral | 1 | October 26, 1897 | Indianapolis, Indiana | |
| Ad Santel | 1 | June 20, 1898 | Chicago, Illinois | |
| Fred Beell | 1 | November 7, 1901 | N/A | |
| Martin "Farmer" Burns | 2 | December 25, 1902 | Worcester, Massachusetts | |
| Fred Beell | 2 | April 3, 1903 | Buffalo, New York | |
| Americus | 1 | January 27, 1904 | Bellingham, Washington | |
| Jim Londos | 3 | March 15, 1905 | New York City, New York | |
| Earl Caddock | 2 | May 23, 1906 | Kansas City, Missouri | |
| Jim Londos | 1 | December 1, 1906 | New Orleans, Louisiana | |
| Clarence Eklund | 3 | December 17, 1906 | Kansas City, Missouri | |
| Helmer Myre | 1 | April 3, 1908 | N/A | |
| Clarence Eklund | 1 | October 25, 1910 | Minneapolis, Minnesota | |
| Helmer Myre | 2 | February 1, 1911 | Minneapolis, Minnesota | |
| Clarence Eklund | 1 | March 6, 1911 | Chicago, Illinois | |
| Charlie Rentrop | 2 | March 25, 1911 | Buffalo, New York | |
| Clarence Eklund | 1 | November 7, 1911 | Des Moines, Iowa | |
| Ted Thye | 2 | December 14, 1911 | Minneapolis, Minnesota | |
| Clarence Eklund | 3 | March 25, 1912 | Chicago, Illinois | |
| Ira Dern | 2 | July 4, 1913 | Benton Harbor, Michigan | |
| Pinky Gardner | 1 | September 18, 1913 | Lexington, Kentucky | |
| Clarence Eklund | 1 | October 21, 1913 | Lexington, Kentucky | |
| John Shimkus | 3 | July 10, 1914 | Rock Island, Illinois | |
| Clarence Eklund | 1 | January 8, 1917 | Wilkes-Barre, Pennsylvania | |
| Ray Steele | 1 | January 19, 1881 | New York City, New York | |
| Ted Thye | 1 | August 7, 1882 | New York City, New York | |
| Billy Edwards | 1 | April 11, 1887 | Chicago, Illinois | |
| Charlie Fischer | 1 | April 20, 1895 | Chicago, Illinois | |
| Clarence Eklund | 1 | October 26, 1897 | Indianapolis, Indiana | |
| Hugh Nichols | 1 | June 20, 1898 | Chicago, Illinois | |

== See also ==
- World Light Heavyweight Championship (Australian version)
- World Light Heavyweight Championship (National Wrestling Association)
