= Al Hobman =

Personal information
- Born: 23 April 1925 New Zealand
- Died: 21 September 2008 (aged 83) Wellington, New Zealand

Professional wrestling career
- Ring name: Al Hobman
- Billed height: 1.85 m (6 ft 1 in)
- Billed weight: 110 kg (240 lb)

Allan "Al" Hobman (23 April 1925 – 21 September 2008) was a New Zealand professional wrestler, trainer and promoter. Hobman was one of the first homegrown stars to emerge from the Dominion Wrestling Union, and later Steve Rickard's All Star-Pro Wrestling, during the 1960s and 70s such as Tony Garea, Peter Maivia and The Sheepherders. Hobman twice won the NWA New Zealand Heavyweight Championship from John Da Silva in 1960 and Steve Rickard in 1964 with a combined reign of nearly 6 years as champion. He and Rickard were also the first New Zealand Tag Team Champions.

Prior to wrestling, Hobman had a successful athletic career playing rugby union at Rongotai College as a lock for Oriental Rongotai as well as a professional bodybuilder winning both the Mr. Australasia and Mr. New Zealand bodybuilding competitions in 1951.

Hobman wrestled throughout the world during his career, most often in Asia and the South Pacific, but also had successful stints in the United States, most notably, against then NWA World Heavyweight Champion Gene Kiniski in 1969. He was a successful promoter both prior to and during his later career, mainly working with Da Silva's Central Wrestling Association, and trained a number of wrestlers with Bruno Bekkar at the famed Koolmans Gym including Jock Ruddock and Butch Miller; two of his four children, Kurt and Linda Hobman, both became wrestlers as well with the elder Hobman staging the country's first officially sanctioned women's wrestling match between his daughter and Dutch female wrestler Monica Schumaker.

He was among several New Zealand wrestling legends involved with Kiwi Pro Wrestling, one of the first wrestling promotions to open since the close of All Star-Pro Wrestling in 1992, and inducted into KPW's New Zealand Wrestling Hall of Fame in 2006. He also attended live events made other public appearances until his sudden death two years later. In 2009, less than a year after his death, Hobman was ranked No. 5 in a top ten list of New Zealand's greatest wrestlers by Fight Times Magazine.

== Career ==
=== Early athletic and wrestling career ===
A lifelong resident of Wellington, Allan Hobman was active in sports and athletics at a young age and began playing rugby union at Rongotai College as a lock for the Oriental Rongotai. Hobman weighed around 75 kg at this time and suffered constant injuries going up against 100 – 130 kg sized opponents. He was soon introduced to weightlifting by a friend of his and, with nutrition and training regimen, gradually built up his body-weight to around 110 kg. In addition to improving his performance in rugby, Hobman also took up competitive bodybuilding and won both Mr. Australasia and Mr. New Zealand titles in 1951.

Hobman spent much of his training at Koolman's Gym in Wellington where he also acted as a sparring partner to boxers and wrestlers from both New Zealand and overseas. It was during this time that Hobman became interested in a professional career as a wrestler, which he described as being claimed by its "call", and was wrestling for promoters throughout the country by the late-1950s. His debut match against Australian wrestler Rick Wallace ended with his losing two falls to one in the Wellington Town Hall. Wrestling for the New Zealand Wrestling Union, he soon became a familiar face to New Zealand wrestling fans wrestling in nearly every town and city "from Kaitaia to Invercargill". Hobman was soon invited to his first overseas tour for Greek promoter George Gardiner in Australia followed by visits to the United States, Canada and the South Pacific; specifically the Cook Islands, Tahiti, Fiji, Malaysia and Singapore. He was also brought over to Japan by Canadian and Commonwealth Champion, Gordon Nelson.

=== Headliner during the 1960s and 70s ===
Hobman was not only as a formidable journeyman wrestler but was also a top draw in his native country with bouts at the Wellington Town Hall against The Great Zorro, Tony "The Greek" Kontellis, John Da Silva, Pat O'Connor and Bruno Bekkar among others. One of his bouts against Becker in New Plymouth featured Lofty Blomfield as special guest referee. The proceeds from this match were donated to the Intellectually Handicapped Children's Society of which Blomfield was president. On 26 October 1960, Hobman defeated Da Silva for the vacant NWA New Zealand Heavyweight Championship. He won the title a second time from Steve Rickard in 1964 and held the belt for three years before losing it to Da Silva in Wellington on 7 September 1967; his combined title reigns totalled nearly six years. He and Rickard also became the first New Zealand Tag Team Champions. On 22 April 1969, Hobman wrestled Gene Kiniski for the NWA World Heavyweight Championship in Portland, Oregon.

Much of his early career was spent in Rickard's NWA-affiliated All Star-Pro Wrestling, however, he also competed for smaller promotions such as South Pacific Wrestling Association and John Da Silva's Central Wrestling Association. Towards the end of the decade, he became a promoter for the CWA as well and trained a number of wrestlers out of Koolmans Gym with Bruno Bekkar and George Kidd. Among his students were Jock Ruddock and Butch Miller. Two of his four children, Kurt and Linda Hobman, also became professional wrestlers with Al Hobman promoting the first-ever women's wrestling match between his daughter, wrestling under the name Linda Tyson, and daughter Dutch professional wrestler Willen Schumaker, Monica Schumaker. Prior to 1973, female wrestling was illegal in New Zealand. He also made appearances on the popular television programme On the Mat.

=== Retirement and later years ===
Retiring by the 1980s, he remained absent from the industry for a quarter of a century until the opening of Kiwi Pro Wrestling in May 2006. It was one of the first promotions to open since the close of All Star-Pro Wrestling in 1992, one of three major companies to emerge during the 2000s, with Hobman as one of its strongest supporters. He appeared at many of its live events and was one of several New Zealand wrestling legends to be interviewed by KiwiProWrestling.co.nz. Hobman was also inducted into the New Zealand Wrestling Hall of Fame by former student and KPW Commissioner Butch Miller on 8 December 2006, along with Bob Crozier, Bruno Bekkar and Rip Morgan. He and other veterans also worked with KPW's younger wrestlers and remained closely associated with the promotion until dying unexpectedly at his home on 21 September 2008.

A month after his death, Kurt Hobman, Steve Rickard, Bruno Bekkar, Juno Huia, Cowboy Billy Wright, Ricky Wallace and Bob Crozier appeared at the KPW supercard "Halloween Howl 3" held in Wellington High School to pay tribute to Hobman's death; the main event between KPW Champion H-Fame and Inferno was dedicated to Hobman's memory. In a statement from KPW's website, Off the Ropes play by play announcer Blair "The Flair" Rhodes wrote "Mr. Hobman was renowned not only as an exemplary sportsman in the ring, but was also remembered amongst all his peers as a gentleman outside the ring. Being such a man of real character and bearing, Mr Hobman was a true ambassador for the business of professional wrestling". Five months later, he was ranked No. 5 in a top ten list of New Zealand's greatest wrestlers by Fight Times Magazine.

== Championships and accomplishments ==
=== Bodybuilding ===
- Mr. Australasia (1951)
- Mr. New Zealand (1951)

=== Professional wrestling ===
- Kiwi Pro Wrestling
  - New Zealand Wrestling Hall of Fame (Class of 2006)
- NWA New Zealand
  - NWA New Zealand Heavyweight Championship (2 times)
  - NWA New Zealand Tag Team Championship (1 time, first) – with Steve Rickard
