= Ted Thye =

American wrestler (1890–1966)

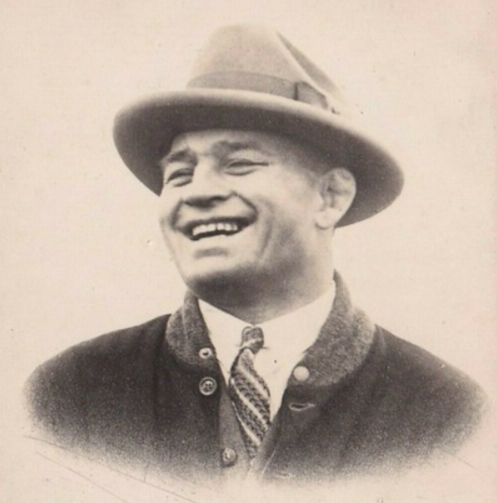

Personal information
- Born: Theodore Thye; August 26, 1890 Frederick, South Dakota, U.S.
- Died: March 22, 1966 (aged 74) Portland, Oregon
- Spouse: Frances C. Bushman (m. 1919; died 1958)
- Relative: Edward John Thye (brother)

Professional wrestling career
- Billed height: 5 ft 9 in (175 cm)
- Billed weight: 168 lb (76 kg)
- Billed from: Portland, Oregon
- Trained by: Dave Burns; Dr. John Berg
- Debut: 1915
- Retired: 1935

Achievements and titles

Theodore Thye (August 26, 1890 – March 22, 1966) was an American wrestler, promotor and manager in the United States.

== Professional wrestling career ==
During his career he worked with Emile Czaja and Ed "Strangler" Lewis. Thye was a multiple time winner of the World Light Heavyweight Championship. He was also the World Light Heavyweight Championship (Australian version) by defeating Clarence Eklund. He also won the Pacific Coast Middleweight Championship in 1920 and the Pacific Coast Light Heavyweight Championship in 1922. He defeated Billy Meeske in 1924. Thye wrestled under Stadiums Limited for a period of time.

Pacific Northwest Wrestling started in the early 1920s when Thye, a former world middleweight and world light-heavyweight (Australian version) wrestling champion, came to Portland with plans to promote both boxing and wrestling. Ted served as a booking agent for Lou Thesz at the Dominion Wrestling Union.

== Personal life ==
Thye was the brother of Edward John Thye.

== Championships and accomplishments ==
- Stadiums Limited
  - World Light Heavyweight Championship (Australian version) (2 times, inaugural)
- Western Athletic Club
  - World Light Heavyweight Championship (Pacific Coast version) (3 times)
  - Pacific Coast Middleweight Championship (1 time, inaugural)
  - Pacific Northwest Light Heavyweight Championship (1 time)
  - Pacific Northwest Middleweight Championship (1 time)
  - Pacific Northwest Welterweight Championship (1 time)
- Other titles
  - World Middleweight Championship (1 time)
  - World Middleweight Championship (Los Angeles version) (1 time)
  - World Light Heavyweight Championship (1 time)
