= Ad Santel =

German-American professional wrestler

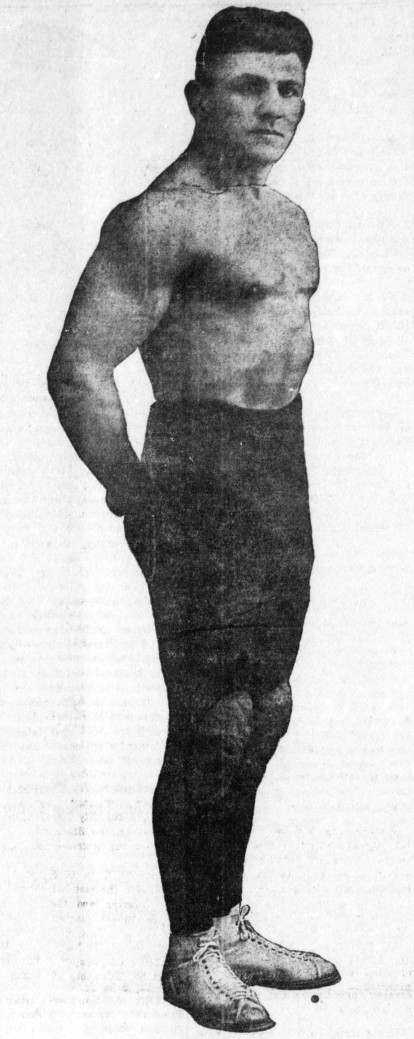

Personal information
- Born: Adolph Ernst; April 7, 1887 Dresden, Kingdom of Saxony, German Empire
- Died: November 10, 1966 (aged 79) Alameda, California, U.S.

Professional wrestling career
- Ring name(s): Al Santel; Otto Carpenter; Mysterious Carpenter; Adolph Ernst
- Billed height: 5 ft 9 in (1.75 m)
- Billed weight: 185 lb (84 kg)
- Debut: 1907
- Retired: 1933

Adolph Ernst (April 7, 1887 – November 10, 1966), better known for his ring name Ad Santel, was a German-American professional wrestler, considered one of the greatest practitioners of catch wrestling. He was a World Light Heavyweight Champion for several years. Santel also billed himself as the World Judo Champion during his feud with the Kodokan judo school.

== Career ==
Ad Santel's professional wrestling career took him all throughout the world, wrestling some of the top wrestlers of the 1910s, 1920s, and 1930s including Joe Stecher, Gus Sonnenberg, John Pesek and Dick Daviscourt, and reigning as World Light Heavyweight Champion for several years. In San Francisco in August 1921, Santel faced 290 lb Gobar Guho in a matched billed for the "World Wrestling Championship." Gobar beat Santel after an hour and three minutes of wrestling. Having defeated jiu-jitsu and judoka overseas and acquired their knowledge and techniques, Santel claimed the title of "World Judo Champion." However, pro wrestling critic Teiji Kojima says this was only after he came to Japan.

On November 30, 1915, he defeated Jujutsu martial artist Kiyoshi Noguchi. Noguchi attempted to come back at the second round, but again, Santel submitted him after ten minutes, winning the challenge.

=== Rivalry with the Kodokan ===
Ad Santel fought one of the early clash-of-the-styles matches in modern martial arts history against Tokugoro Ito, a 5th degree black belt in judo from Japan. Fighting under judo rules, which he knew thanks to a previous match against jujutsu specialist Senryuken Noguchi, Santel defeated Ito when a slamming takedown rendered the judoka unable to continue, and then proclaimed himself the World Judo Champion. Tokugoro Ito went on to avenge the loss a few months later on June 10, 1916, by defeating Santel with a choke hold, becoming the only judoka ever to defeat Santel.

In October 1917, Santel came to Seattle and challenged resident judo master Taro Miyake, who Santel had already met in a draw. Santel won with such a powerful half nelson slam that Miyake remained dizzy for half an hour after the match. Seeing this as a new offense, judo founder Jigoro Kano sent 5th degree black belt Daisuke Sakai to avenge his defeat, but Santel again got over him, submitting Sakai twice with a biceps slicer. According to Yoshida in Judo magazine, in the second round Sakai went for a rear naked choke when the referee patted Sakai's shoulder to move to the center, and Sakai mistakenly thought this was a submission and released it. Santel then submitted with an armlock while trapping Sakai's legs. However, the second round was called off after protests from the Japanese audience. Santel won the third round at 7 minutes with an armlock from a pin.

As the Kodokan school did not send more challengers, Santel decided to travel to Japan to challenge them in their own ground. He assembled a team with fellow wrestlers Henry Weber and Manjiro "Matty" Matsuda, the latter being a judo black belt who had turned to catch wrestling years before. Their travel was possible thanks to Kodokan member Heita Okabe, who helped to host a series of matches between Santel's team and the Kodokan. Though Kano refused to sanction the event and threatened his students with expulsion if they fought. However in 1921, six of them accepted the challenge nonetheless, among them 5th degree black belts Hikoo Shoji and Reijiro Nakata. It was decided the bouts would be contested under neutral rules that demanded judogi jackets yet allowed all sorts of holds. In front of a crowd of 10,000 at the Yasukuni shrine, Santel defeated Nagata by TKO after a devastating headlock, and the next day he had a 60-minute draw with Shoji, who left the mat so battered that Santel himself had to help him out of the arena. Later, Santel would defeat another judoka, Hitoshi Shimizu, to avenge Shimizu's victory over Weber. Teiji Kojima stated that the tournament was a genuine competition with no fixed matches.

The impact of these performances on Japan was immense. The Japanese were fascinated by the submissions taught in catch wrestling, and Japanese fighters traveled to Europe in order to either participate in various tournaments or to learn catch wrestling at European schools such as Billy Riley's school in Wigan, UK. Okabe and the judo challengers were effectively expelled from Kodokan, but some of them followed Santel to the United States to train with him, among them Hikoo Shoji, who became a freestyle wrestling pioneer in Japan.

In 1925, Santel faced a new judoka, this time Tsutao Higami, a 165-pound lighter but highly renowned groundwork expert who had trained under Ito and Miyake. The match had two falls as in professional wrestling and was refereed by judoka Hiroshi Kitayama. Santel won the first fall, scoring a takedown and transitioning into a neckscissors hold that choked Higami out. After being revived, Higami proceeded to win the second fall, going through a back and forth round and locking a juji-gatame which Kitayama called on his favor. With the two falls evenly scored, the match ended in a draw, although Higami decided to learn wrestling shortly after. In 1926, Santel would face Setsuzo Ota, drawing again. He also drew with judoka and sumotori Shikina Oki in 1933.

=== Late career ===
Years after the famous 1911 match between Frank Gotch and Georg Hackenschmidt, Santel told Lou Thesz that he was paid $5,000 by Gotch's backers to cripple Hackenschmidt in training, and make it look like an accident. According to Hackenschmidt himself, the injury was accidentally inflicted by his sparring partner, Dr. Roller, when trying to hold Hackenschmidt down onto his knees and Roller's right foot striking Hackenschmidt's right knee; his sparring partners were Jacobus Koch, Wladek Zbyszko and Dr. Roller. Ad Santel is not mentioned in any account of Hackenschmidt's training by either Hackenschmidt or Roller, both of whom offered their insights and accounts. However, Ad Santel was Hackenschmidt's head trainer and sparring partner using his real name of Adolph Ernst for about a year prior and right up until the second Gotch match when he was replaced with Dr Roller. Ernst was listed in almost every newspaper story on Hackenschmidt in the months prior to the Gotch rematch. It's believed Hackenshmidt put out the Roller story in hopes of Gotch and Burns refusing to pay Santel.

Santel, along with George Tragos, Ray Steele and Ed Lewis, trained Lou Thesz in the art of catch wrestling. Thesz studied under Santel for six intensive months and, throughout his career, continued to train under him whenever he was in the California area. Thesz considered his training with the German to be an "incredible gift".

== Career highlights ==
- Won over Senryuken Noguchi in San Francisco, California, on November 30, 1915
- Won over Tokugoro Ito in San Francisco, California, on February 5, 1916 (KO from takedown)
- Lost to Tokugoro Ito in San Francisco, California, on June 10, 1916 (submission from choke)
- Lost to Joe Stecher in San Francisco, California, on February 22, 1917
- Won over Taro Miyake in Seattle, Washington, on October 20, 1917 (KO from half nelson slam)
- Won over Daisuke Sakai in Seattle, Washington, on September 2, 1917 (submission from biceps slicer)
- Won over Reijiro Nagata in Tokyo, Japan on March 5, 1921 (TKO from headlock)
- Drew with Hikoo Shoji in Tokyo, Japan on March 6, 1921
- Won over Hitoshi Shimizu in Nagoya, Japan in March 1921
- Lost to Gobar Guha in San Francisco, California, on August 30, 1921
- Drew with Tsutao Higami in Big Island, Virginia, on July 4, 1925
- Drew with Setsuzo Oza in Los Angeles, California, on January 27, 1926
- Lost to Ed "The Strangler" Lewis in Oakland, California, on April 28, 1933
- Drew with Shikina Oki in Los Angeles, California, on May 17, 1933
- Won over Kanetaka Kitahata in Los Angeles, California, on September 11, 1933

== Championships and accomplishments ==
- World Light Heavyweight Championship
- World Judo Champion
- International Professional Wrestling Hall of Fame - Class of 2024
