= NWA Australasian Heavyweight Championship =

Australasian Heavyweight Championship

Details
- Promotion: Dominion Wrestling Union (1938–1951); All Star Pro Wrestling (1964–1968)
- Date established: 1938; 87 years ago
- Date retired: 1968; 57 years ago
Statistics
- First champion: Lofty Blomfield
- Final champion: Peter Maivia
- Most reigns: Peter Maivia

The New Zealand version of the NWA Australasian Heavyweight Championship was a professional wrestling regional heavyweight championship recognized by the National Wrestling Alliance and competed for by wrestlers in the Australasian region. It was largely defended in New Zealand's Dominion Wrestling Union from around 1938 to 1951 and in All Star Pro Wrestling from 1964 to 1968. The earliest-known champion was New Zealand wrestler Lofty Blomfield who defended the title until losing it to American wrestler Ray Steele in Auckland on December 12, 1938. Peter Maivia and Steve Rickard feuded over the title during the mid-1960s with Maivia regaining the title in 1968 shortly before it was abandoned. Much of the title's history is unknown, however, there were 7 officially recognized champions during the three decades it was defended.

== Title history ==
#	Order in reign history
Reign	The reign number for the specific set of wrestlers listed
Event	The event in which the title was won
—	Used for vacated reigns so as not to count it as an official reign
N/A	The information is not available or is unknown
+	Indicates the current reign is changing daily

=== Reigns ===
#	Wrestlers	Reign	Date	Days held	Location	Event	Notes	Ref.
1	Lofty Blomfield	1	N/A	N/A	N/A	N/A	Earliest known champion.	
2	Ray Steele	1	December 10, 1938	N/A	Auckland, New Zealand	Live event		
—	N/A	—	1938-1951	—	N/A	N/A	Title history is unrecorded.	
3	Ken Kenneth	1	N/A	N/A	N/A	N/A		
4	Al Costello	1	1951	N/A	N/A	N/A		
—	N/A	—	1951-1964	—	N/A	N/A	Title history is unrecorded.	
5	Kangaroo Kennedy	1	N/A	N/A	N/A	N/A		
6	Peter Maivia	2	1964	N/A	Auckland, New Zealand	Live event		
7	Steve Rickard	1	1968	N/A	N/A	Live event		
8	Peter Maivia	2	1968	192	Auckland	Live event		
—	Deactivated	—	1968	—	N/A	N/A	The title is abandoned.	
