= Bruno Bekkar =

New Zealand professional wrestler and trainer

Personal information
- Born: Bryan Ashby Wellington, New Zealand

Professional wrestling career
- Ring name(s): Bruno Bekkar; Bruno Bekker; Bruno Becker; Bryan Ashby
- Billed height: 6 ft 1 in (185 cm)
- Billed weight: 114 kg (251 lb)
- Trained by: John da Silva
- Debut: early 1960s
- Retired: 1992

Bryan Ashby is a retired New Zealand professional wrestler and trainer, known by his ring name Bruno Bekkar, who competed for Steve Rickard's All Star-Pro Wrestling and for other promoters in New Zealand and Australia from the early 1960s until his retirement in 1992. One of the country's biggest stars during the 1970s, he is a three-time NWA New Zealand Heavyweight Champion and a former NWA Australia Heavyweight Champion. He also teamed with Don Kent in the Puerto Rico-based World Wrestling Council as the fourth incarnation of the Fabulous Kangaroos and together twice won the WWC North American Tag Team Championship in 1981.

During his professional career, Ashby and Al Hobman trained several wrestlers out of Koolman's Gym in Wellington, most notably, Jock Ruddock and Butch Miller. Ashby is credited for first introducing Luke Williams to pro wrestling and who later joined Miller to form the Sheepherders. He was one of several veterans involved in Kiwi Pro Wrestling, one of the three major companies in New Zealand, and was inducted into KPW's New Zealand Wrestling Hall of Fame in 2006. In 2009, Ashby was ranked #6 in a top ten list of New Zealand's greatest wrestlers by Fight Times Magazine.

== Professional wrestling career ==
=== Early career in Australia ===
Brian Ashby debuted in the early 1960s. He spent some time in Australia early in his career, competing under his real name, and faced Dory Funk Jr. in Melbourne and Brisbane in late-April 1965; he lost to Funk on both occasions. He briefly held the NWA Australian Heavyweight Championship around this time before losing the title to Larry O'Dea in Sydney on 7 May 1965. Like many New Zealand wrestlers of the period, Ashby became an established journeyman wrestler by the end of the decade and was a very big favourite in Singapore and Malaysia. He was also one of the earliest to wrestle in North America alongside fellow New Zealanders such as Pat O'Connor, Abe Jacobs, John da Silva, Steve Rickard and Robert Bruce.

=== Return to New Zealand ===
A rising star in Rickard's All Star-Pro Wrestling, he and Al Hobman trained several wrestlers at the famous Koolman's Gym in Wellington including Jock Ruddock and Butch Miller among others. Luke Williams, who would later go on to team with Miller as the Sheepherders, was also brought into the business by Ashby. Ashby was his first tag partner and the two went on several overseas tours together early in Williams career. In time, Ashby became New Zealand's most popular "big man" and enjoyed immense fame in his native country during the 1970s. In 1972, Ashby encountered André the Giant during the French wrestler's tour. He and "Brutal" Bob Miller first faced Andre and Jock Ruddock at a near sold-out show at the YMCA stadium in Palmerston North on 22 February 1972. At one point in the match, Andre lifted the eighteen stone Ashby into the air, sat him on top of a ringpost and patted his cheek "as one would a naughty boy". In the last moments of the match, according to the Manawatu Standard, Ashby and his partner attempted to attack Andre together, but "they paid dearly for this, as [Andre] whipped atomic drops on both of them and the bout was all over". Ashby also wrestled Andre in singles matches and later told the press "thank goodness he leaves the country soon. If he stays much longer there will be no professional wrestlers left."

Ashby had memorable bouts with other foreign wrestlers especially in his later appearances on On the Mat. According to wrestling historian Steve Yohe, Ashby may have wrestled as the masked wrestler Dr. X who teamed with the Destroyer in Auckland in 1973. In 1977, he was allied with Bruiser Brodie during his brief stint in All Star-Pro Wrestling; he and Brodie, with Bugs McGraw, lost to Siva Afi, Kung Fu Lee and Kevin Martin in Auckland on 22 August. A month later in Wellington, he and Brodie teamed with King Curtis Iaukea to beat Mark Lewin, Siva Afi and Samoan Joe on 12 September 1977.

Ashby continued wrestling internationally as well. While touring All-Japan Pro Wrestling in 1979, he joined Kintarō Ōki and Carlos Colon in a 6-man tag team match against Giant Baba, Tiger Toguchi and Akihisa Takachiho. That same month, he was part of the AJPW Black Power series in which he wrestled Akio Sato, Motoshi Okuma, Great Kojika, Rocky Hata and Tiger Toguchi.

=== Don Kent and the Fabulous Kangaroos ===
In 1981, Ashby agreed to team with Don Kent as the fourth incarnation of the Fabulous Kangaroos for a tour of Puerto Rico with the World Wrestling Council. Managed by Al Costello, who asked Kent to team with Ashby, the team successfully captured the WWC North American Tag Team titles from Jack and Jerry Brisco in San Juan on 22 October 1981. They held the titles for a little over a month before losing the belts to Invader I and Super Gladiator on 23 November, but won them back in Bayamón two weeks later. After another two months as champions Ashby and Kent finally dropped the titles back to Invader I and Super Gladiator on 26 January 1982, and went their separate ways at the end of the tour.

=== Later career and retirement ===
Ashby returned to New Zealand where he spent the rest of his career working for Rickard and other promoters. In 1985, he won a championship tournament to claim the then vacant NWA New Zealand Heavyweight Championship. He dominated the title during the mid-to late 1980s, feuding over the title with Johnny Garcia, before finally losing the championship to A.J. Freeley on 22 November 1992. All Star-Pro Wrestling closed shortly afterwards, and with the general decline of professional wrestling in New Zealand, Ashby decided to retire.

On 24 January 2004, Ashby made his first public appearance in over 12 years when he and other veteran New Zealand wrestlers attended a "legends reunion" show at Petone. Ashby one of the first such legends to become involved in the newer promotions which began to emerge during the 21st century, particularly, with Kiwi Pro Wrestling in 2006. He not only attended live events but was also inducted into its New Zealand Wrestling Hall of Fame, along with Bob Crozier, Al Hobman and Rip Morgan, by KPW Commissioner Butch Miller on 8 December 2006; he also made a guest appearance at a sold out Impact Pro Wrestling show in Auckland on 15 March 2007. On 31 October 2008, Ashby appeared with Kurt Hobman, Steve Rickard, Juno Huia, Cowboy Billy Wright, Ricky Wallace and Bob Crozier at the KPW supercard "Halloween Howl 3" held in Wellington High School to pay tribute to Al Hobman who had died the previous month. In 2009, was ranked #6 in a top ten list of New Zealand's greatest wrestlers by Fight Times Magazine. Ashby was also one of the many wrestlers interviewed for the upcoming New Zealand wrestling documentary A Kiwi Century on the Mat.

== Championships and accomplishments ==
- All Star-Pro Wrestling
  - NWA New Zealand Heavyweight Championship (3 times)
- NWA Australia
  - Australian Heavyweight Championship (1 time)
- World Wrestling Council
  - WWC North American Tag Team Championship (2 times)
