= Kiyoshi Noguchi =

Japanese martial artist

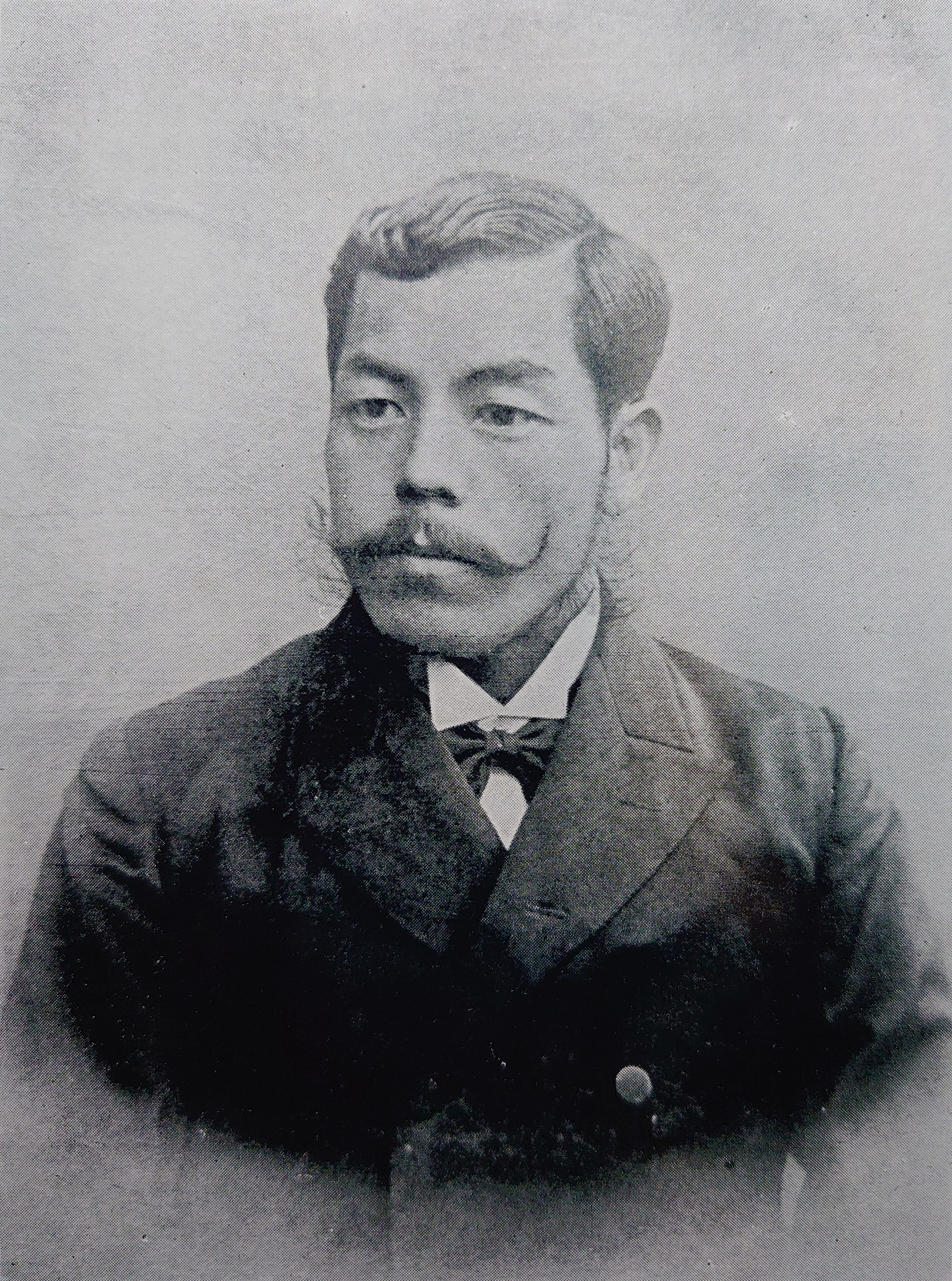
- Noguchi in 1905.
- Born: 1877; Oyama, Tochigi, Japan
- Died: 1930 (aged 52–53); Japan
- Native name: 野口清
- Nationality: Japanese
- Style: Kendo; Jujutsu
- Teacher: Nagashige Noguchi

Other information
- Notable students: Yoshio Noguchi

Kiyoshi Noguchi (野口清, Noguchi Kiyoshi; 1877–1930), also known as Senryuken Noguchi (野口潜龍軒, Noguchi Senryuken) was a Japanese martial artist. He was the founder of the Shinto Rokugo-ryū and Shinto Fuso-ryū schools of martial arts, as well as a scholar and popularizer of jujutsu through mail order marketing.

== Biography ==
Noguchi trained kendo since his childhood with his father Nagashige, an instructor for the Dai Nippon Butoku Kai, and throughout his life he would add training in a variety of fighting styles, among them judo, sumo and multiple styles of jujutsu, such as Tenjin Shinyo-ryū, Kitō-ryū, Tenka Muso-ryū, Kiraku-ryū and Shinkage-ryū.

After graduating from the Tokyo Law School (predecessor to the current Chuo University), he worked in the Government-General of Taiwan before moving with his brother Shohachiro to open a martial arts dojo in Yūki, Ibaraki in 1898. The same year, Noguchi officially founded the styles Shintō Rokugō-ryū (神道六合流) and Shintō Fusō-ryū (神道扶桑流), which hybridized all of his knowledge in jujutsu and kendo. By 1903, the Noguchi Dojo had over 1600 students and multiple branches in several cities of Japan, which led to the creation of the Teikoku Shobukai (帝國尚武會).

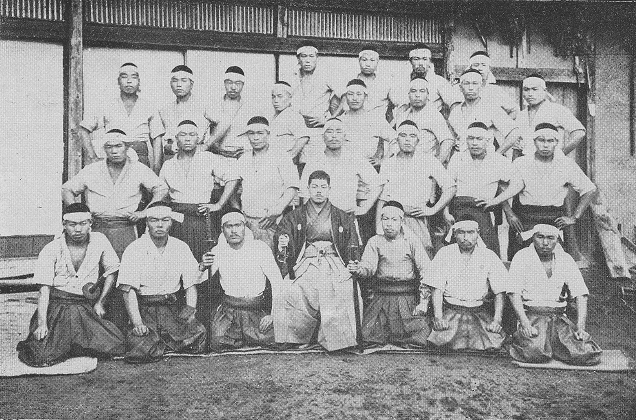
Noguchi and his students in 1912.

In 1908, Noguchi served as a hand-to-hand instructor in both Japan and the Japanese concession of Tianjin, China. On 24 May, he answered to a wrestling challenge by Mossel, a French soldier that was described as being larger than then-yokozuna Hitachiyama Taniemon. Mossel had previously defeated two black belt judokas, advantaged by not wearing a gi jacket, but Noguchi easily threw him thrice, after which he pinned and choked him out with kata-gatame. He also helped reviving Mossel by kappo, earning the awe and ovation of the crowd, after which no present wrestler answered to his own challenge.

In 1915, he traveled to San Francisco, United States, where he encountered catch wrestler Ad Santel in the ring on 30 November, in a match that was hosted under the local rule of the best of three rounds. In the first round, Santel scored a takedown and pinned Noguchi, and although the Japanese attempted to work from the bottom, the stronger German ultimately shut him off and choked him out for the win. Noguchi attempted to come back at the second round, but again, Santel submitted him after ten minutes, winning the challenge.

Noguchi became the chairman of the Teikoku Shobukai in 1926, dying five years later. Among his chief disciples were Daitō-ryū Aiki-jūjutsu exponent Mitsuru Sato, aikidoka Seito Tanaka and future judo 9º dan Harutsugi Kurosu.
