= Dominion Wrestling Union =

- Acronym: DWU
- Founded: 1929
- Defunct: 1962
- Headquarters: New Zealand

The Dominion Wrestling Union (DWU) was the first professional wrestling promotion in New Zealand. It was one of two organisations first active in the Australasian region, along with Australia's Stadiums Limited, and served as the country's single major promotion for 30 years until being succeeded by All Star Pro Wrestling in 1962. The DWU was initially under the control of the New Zealand Wrestling Union, a sort of governing body which promoted both amateur and professional bouts, until American promoter Walter Miller largely took over the running of professional events in 1935 and which remained under Miller's control until his death in 1959.

Miller eventually established New Zealand as one of the first international territories of the National Wrestling Association, and later the National Wrestling Alliance, from which many of the stars of the era were brought to face the country's top wrestlers. From its earliest days, New Zealand professional wrestlers were recruited from the amateur ranks including Lofty Blomfield in the 1930s and later Pat O'Connor, Dick Hrstich, Abe Jacobs, John da Silva and Steve Rickard during the 1940s and 1950s. Many others would leave New Zealand in the years following the Second World War, such as Ernie "Kiwi" Kingston, to pursue a career in Europe and North America.

When Miller died in 1959, wrestler Steve Rickard continued running the DWU for two years until founding his own promotion, All Star Pro Wrestling, in 1962. This new organisation took the DWU's spot as the country's main professional wrestling promotion for the next 30 years, and as an overseas NWA territory, until its close in the early 1990s.

== History ==
=== Background ===
Professional wrestling bouts had been held in New Zealand as early as the 1860s, with modern professional wrestling taking shape around the turn of the 20th century, and were generally held by private and local athletic associations. Gisborne Katene defeated Frank Findlay for the NWA New Zealand Heavyweight Championship in 1919 but subsequently became vacant. The first champion officially recognized by the National Wrestling Association was Maori wrestler Ike Robin who won the title in Auckland on 17 March 1925, and retired as champion the following year. Shortly before his retirement, Robin faced one-time World Heavyweight Champion Stanislaus Zbyszko in a three-match series at the Auckland Town Hall in 1926. According to one account by the New Zealand Railways Magazine, one of their matches ended in a time-limit draw after having "gone on for many weary hours and when midnight Saturday chimed and Sunday commenced the match had to cease". Though separated by thousands of miles, professional wrestling as practiced in the South Pacific region would continue to follow along the same lines as in Canada and the United States.

=== Early years ===
The New Zealand Wrestling Union was officially founded on 22 July 1930, at the Central Fire Station in Wellington. Its purpose was to unite the various amateur and professional wrestling associations under a governing body in order to promote events on a national scale, establish a level of professionalism and to keeping the game clean of so-called "rough-house wrestling". The sport flourished while under the control of the union and, on 22 June 1931, the New Zealand School of Wrestling was officially opened at Wellington with one-time Australian heavyweight champion “Smiler” Clark as its head instructor and operated by sportsman Pat Allen. It was the first facility to provide "ideal gymnasium conditions" for developing top level amateur talent. The first national amateur championships were held with Lofty Blomfield becoming the first heavyweight amateur champion; he entered professional wrestling shortly afterwards and became the first undisputed New Zealand Heavyweight Champion seven years later. In 1933, NZWU President H.D. Bennett travelled to Australia seeking to improve the quality of its imported talent. A year later, Gus Sonnenberg, Wong Buk Cheung and Dan Koloff agreed to tour the country.

=== Takeover by Walter Miller ===
By 1935, however, it had become difficult to find enough professionals, and American promoter Walter Miller was hired as a booking agent. He was eventually granted control of the professional wrestling groups, under the Dominion Wrestling Union, and was able to bring in many National Wrestling Association stars of the time, the majority from Canada and the United States, to face some of the country's leading wrestlers.

Miller's organisation would sign wrestlers on a seasonal basis, usually from May to November, and required wrestlers to have licensing for that period. Canadians were especially important draws as they were then subjects of the British Empire and not subject to the same taxation as were required by American wrestlers. The same year that Miller took over, Canadian wrestler George Walker, then holder of the NWA British Empire Heavyweight Championship, left to compete for a rival promotion. The title was subsequently awarded to another Canadian, former Olympian Earl McCready, who legitimised his claim to the title by defeating Walker on 9 November 1937; his second and final reign lasted from 1940 to 1953. Other foreigners to become major stars for the DWU included Dean Detton, Ken Kenneth, John Kattan and African-American wrestler Jack Claybourne.

Within a few years, Miller had successfully established the promotion as one of the NWA's first international territories. In 1937, the promotion hosted a tour which included Dr. Gordon McKenzie, Tom Meade, Don Mclntyre, Hal Rumberg, Ray Richards, Sam Stein, Jack Forsgren, John Spellman, Matros Kirilenko, King Kong Cox, Chief Little Wolf, Frank Marshall, Rusty Wescoatt, Glen Wade, Joe Woods, Frank Judson, Don Noland, Vie Christy, Francis Fouche and Ed "Strangler" Lewis.

Lofty Blomfield was arguably New Zealand's most popular wrestler of the period. He had turned pro shortly after becoming the first national heavyweight amateur champion in 1931, and within a few years captured the NWA New Zealand Heavyweight Championship. One of the first international title defences to take place in New Zealand was to have been a "champion vs. champion" match between Blomfield and NWA World Heavyweight Champion Bronko Nagurski during the late-1930s. It was primarily arranged by Miller, working in partnership with NWA promoters Toots Mondt, Lou Daro and Tony Stecher, and included Nagurski being offered the largest guarantee ever offered a boxer or wrestler in the Southern Hemisphere. The event was expected to have over 40,000 fans in attendance. Nagurski cancelled the trip at the last minute, however, Blomfield followed the world champion to Canada where the two wrestled to a time limit draw in Vancouver on 17 March 1938. Blomfield was the first New Zealander to challenge for the NWA World title. Seven months later, he won a tournament to become the undisputed New Zealand Heavyweight Champion. Blomfield held the title for over a decade until his retirement on 7 June 1949. Throughout his career, Blomfield vigorously defended professional wrestling and denied frequent charges that matches were rigged.

=== Golden Age ===
Both amateur and professional wrestling were at the height of popularity during the 1950s, and by 1956, it was regarded as the most popular spectator sport in New Zealand along with horse racing. Much of this popularity was due in part to radio broadcasts from live events in the interwar and post-WWII years; the Wellington Town Hall Concert Chamber was one of the more popular postwar venues for wrestling events. New Zealand champions also began travelling oversees, as far as Western Canada, during the decade.

Although its older stars such as Blomfield or McCready retired in the years following World War II, a new generation of wrestlers emerged during the 1950s including Pat O'Connor, Dick Hrstich, Abe Jacobs, John da Silva and Steve Rickard. Discovered by visiting American wrestlers Joe Pazandak and Butch Levy, O'Connor was taken to the United States where he eventually became a top star for the National Wrestling Alliance and the American Wrestling Association, and later won the NWA World Heavyweight Championship from Dick Hutton. O'Connor was the first New Zealander to win the NWA World title and his success encouraged others to follow him to North America. A year after his world title victory, O'Connor was challenged by fellow DWU veteran Abe Jacobs in New York marking the first time two New Zealanders fought for a world heavyweight championship, and on foreign soil.

Miller also continued to bring in major names such as Al Costello, Don Beitleman, The Great Zorro and Johnny Kostas. A 1956 bout between Samoan wrestler Alo Leilani and Pat O'Connor, in his first appearance since going to the US, was in front of a sellout crowd at Rotorua. O'Connor also defeated Australia's Al Costello at Carlaw Park in Auckland before a "tremendous outdoor crowd". It was the first outdoor event staged in New Zealand since Lofty Blomfield defeated Brother Jonathan prior to the Second World War. Lou Thesz was scheduled to headline an American tour of the country while visiting Australia in late-1957. He was originally promoted as the NWA World Champion by then American booking agent Ted Thye, though the title was disputed between Thesz and Edouard Carpentier, and set to defend the title against Ricky Waldo and Ski Hi Lee in Wellington, Auckland and Christchurch. Though an agreement had been made between Thye and Miller, Melbourne promoter Dick Lean refused to allow them to compete for the DWU while they were still under contract in Australia. The promotion made a late bid to prevent the late cancellation, including a last minute phone conversation between Lean and then Dominion Wrestling Union secretary Bert Steele, but were unsuccessful. The promotion suffered a significant financial loss, as attendance for these events had been very high, and were forced to offer a refund to all ticket holders.

In February 1959, 61-year-old Jim Londos wrestled New Zealander Fred Wright at Auckland's Western Springs Stadium in front of 6,000 fans. The match ended in controversy as Londos' opponent hit the referee with a haymaker and disqualified and received some attention by the Auckland media.

=== Final years ===
Although he relented slightly in his later years, Miller had maintained a strict control over the sport and talent throughout his 30-year involvement with the promotion. He was specifically dedicated to the older-style popularised by the Gold Dust Trio and, with "gimmick characters" and less focus on athleticism becoming popular in the US, believed that "American gimmickry" would drive away fans in New Zealand. Miller died in 1959 and was succeeded by Steve Rickard who ran the Dominion Wrestling Union for next three years. In 1961, the amateur side of the sport decided to break away from the New Zealand Wrestling Union and was accepted into the International Amateur Wrestling Federation, followed by the New Zealand Olympic and British Empire Games Associations. Rickard established the All Star Pro-Wrestling in 1962 which succeeded the DWU as the single major promotion in the country.

== Championships based at DWU ==
- NWA New Zealand Heavyweight Championship later continued by All Star Pro-Wrestling
- NWA British Empire/Commonwealth Championship (New Zealand version) later continued by All Star Pro-Wrestling
- NWA Australasian Heavyweight Championship later continued by All Star Pro-Wrestling

== Alumni ==
This is not an exhaustive list, as DWU was the only national promotion in New Zealand until 1962 and many wrestlers, both New Zealanders who competed for a brief time and then retired, or foreigners who came for a single tour, were booked.

=== New Zealanders ===
- Lofty Blomfield
- Ray Clarke
- John da Silva
- Al Hobman
- Dick Hrstich
- Anton Koolmann
- Pat O'Connor
- Steve Rickard
- Fred Wright

=== Foreigners ===
- Ali Bey
- Paul Boesch
- "Hangman" Howard Cantonwine
- Wong Buck Cheung
- Vie Christy
- Al Costello
- Wee Willie Davis
- Dean Detton
- Jack Forsgren
- Francis Fouche
- Ed Don George
- Gorgeous George
- Eric Holmback (Yukon Eric)
- Leo Jenson
- Brother Jonathan
- Paul Jones
- Frank Judson
- John Katan
- John Keatos
- Matros Kirilenko
- Bob Kruse
- Dan Koloff
- King Kong Cox
- Ed "Strangler" Lewis
- Alo Leilani
- Chief Little Wolf
- Jim Londos
- Floyd Marshall
- Frank Marshall
- Roy McClarty
- Earl McCready
- Don Mclntyre
- Dr. Gordon McKenzie
- Tom Meade
- Freddie Meyer
- Rene Michot
- Andy Moen
- Don Noland
- George Pencheff
- Martin Plestina
- Ray Richards
- Hal Rumberg
- Steve Savage
- "Jumping" Joe Savoldi
- Oki Shikina
- Gus Sonnenberg
- John Spellman
- Joe Stecher
- Ray Steele
- Sam Stein
- Glen Wade
- George Walker
- Rusty Westcoatt
- Joe Woods
- Jim Wright
- Abe Yourist
- Zebra Kid

== See also ==
- Professional wrestling in New Zealand
- List of professional wrestling promotions in New Zealand
