= Pacific Coast Middleweight Championship =

Professional wrestling championship

Details
- Promotion: Pacific Northwest
- Date established: July 1920
Statistics
- First champion(s): Ted Thye
- Final champion(s): Pat O'Dowdy

The Pacific Coast Middleweight Championship was a professional wrestling championship that was contended for in the Pacific Northwest from the 1920s to the late 1930s.

== Title history ==
Key

Symbol	Meaning
No.	The overall championship reign
Reign	The reign number for the specific wrestler listed.
Event	The event in which the championship changed hands
N/A	The specific information is not known
—	Used for vacated reigns in order to not count it as an official reign
[Note #]	Indicates that the exact length of the title reign is unknown, with a note providing more details.

#	Wrestler	Reign	Date	Days held	Location	Event	Notes	Ref.
1	Ted Thye	1	July 1920	(Note: The length of the reign is too uncertain to calculate.)	Portland, Oregon	House show	Defeated Henry Irslinger to become the first champion	
2	Harold Heibert	1	Before 1933		N/A	House show		
3	Thor Jenson	1	July 12, 1933	120	Eugene, Oregon	House show		
4	Ois Clingman	1	November 9, 1933		Eugene, Oregon	House show		
5	Del Kunkel	1	August 5, 1935		Portland, Oregon	House show	Defeated Danny McShain to win the title, unclear if McShain was the champion or if it was a tournament.	
6	George Wagner	1	1938		Eugene, Oregon	House show	Defeated Buck Lipscomb to win the title, unclear if Lipscomb was the champion or if it was a tournament.	
7	Pat O'Dowdy	1	Before April 1938		N/A	House show		
