= Matty Matsuda =

Japanese-American wrestler

Matsuda

Manjiro "Matty" Matsuda (松田万次郎 (Matsuda Manjirō); b. 1887 Yatsushiro City, Japan, d. August 15, 1929, Battle Creek, Michigan) was a judoka who became a noted professional wrestler in the early 20th century.

== Biography ==
Matsuda moved to America as a teenager, giving judo exhibitions on athletic cards in British Columbia. He took up training in pro wrestling after being inspired by a wrestling match between Frank Gotch and Dan McLeod in Vancouver. After wrestling professionally around the Northwest, Matsuda moved to Minneapolis, wrestling around the Midwest and into the Southeast through the 1910s. He wrestled a four-hour continuous match with rival Johnny Billeter in April, 1912 in Toledo that ended in a draw. A rematch with Billeter that June gave Matsuda a claim to the lightweight wrestling championship. In the 1920s, he moved to Texas and mainly wrestled there and Kansas. In 1920, he laid claim to the welterweight title by defeating rival Jack Reynolds in El Paso. Matsuda died after a brief illness in 1929.
