= Fred Beell =

American professional wrestler and police officer

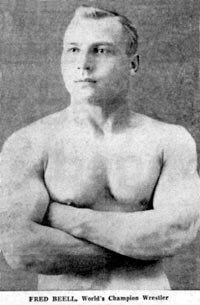

Personal information
- Born: Friedrich A. Beell; January 17, 1876 West Prussia, German Empire
- Died: August 5, 1933 (aged 57) Marshfield, Wisconsin, U.S.

Professional wrestling career
- Ring name: Fred Beell
- Billed height: 5 ft 6 in (168 cm)
- Billed weight: 165 lb (75 kg)
- Debut: 1895
- Retired: 1919

Friedrich A. "Fred" Beell (born January 17, 1876 – August 5, 1933) was a German-born American professional wrestler and police officer.

== Early life ==
Fred Beell was born on January 17, 1876, in Prussia, as one of five children to Wilhelm and Augusta Beell. His birthplace is most commonly listed as West Prussia (part of the province of Prussia at the time of Beell's birth), though it has also been given as Saxony. In 1880, when Beell was three years old, his family migrated to the United States, settling in Marshfield, Wisconsin. He attended Immanual Lutheran School as a child, and at the age of fourteen he began working at the Upham mill in Marshfield. He was locally known for his strength, reportedly capable of carrying a 200-pound (91 kg) deer over his shoulders and keeping a half-barrel of tar balanced while climbing a 20-foot (6.1 m) ladder while still a teenager.

Beell joined the United States Army, serving in the Spanish–American War as part of the 2nd Wisconsin Infantry Regiment. He married Anna Scheren on August 6, 1902.

== Professional wrestling career ==
Beell was introduced to wrestling in 1894 by travelling wrestler Louis Cannon. At the time, wrestlers would fight numerous exhibition matches each month, keeping them on the road constantly. The “Beell Throw” was named after him, based on his perfection of the wrestling move.

On February 3, 1900, Beell defeated Ed Adamson, winning $238.50 (equivalent to $9,230 in 2025) for the match. On April 9, 1900, Beell defeated William West to become the Northwest Wrestling Champion. It was not until 1906 that he gained national attention, when he defeated Frank Gotch, the reigning American Heavyweight Wrestling Champion. Gotch defeated him 16 days later in Kansas City. Beell quit wrestling in 1919 and in 1921, he became a police officer in Marshfield.

== Death ==
Beell died on August 5, 1933, in the line of duty at around 3 AM. Beell and his partner George Fyksen investigated a break-in at the Marshfield Brewing Company. Suspects were still on the scene. Beell, according to the later report published in the Marshfield News-Herald, and a more in-depth report in a 1933 edition of True Detective Mysteries, waited near the patrol vehicle to watch the exits, while Fyksen entered the building. As he entered, the suspects began firing on Fyksen, who dropped to the ground and avoided injury, while returning fire. Beell, hearing the shots, left the vehicle to go to Fyksen's aid. As he rounded the front of the car, the suspects exited the building, firing as they ran. Four buckshot from a shotgun blast hit Beell in the head, without his being able to return fire, killing him instantly. The suspects then stole the police vehicle, but abandoned it less than a mile away. They had stolen $1,550.00 in the burglary of a safe. Marshfield police chief William Paape organized a posse with Wood County, Wisconsin sheriff Martin Bey. One of the suspects, Edward "Speed" Gabriel, was hit by shots fired from Fyksen in the initial gun battle, his body being located in a shallow grave alongside a roadway in Minnesota the next day. Two other suspects, Joe "Sleepy Joe" Hogan and Elmer Dingman were captured. Hogan received 25 years in prison for his part in the murder, while Dingman received a life sentence. Dingmam was paroled on September 25, 1951, and had the remainder of his sentence commuted by Governor Walter J. Kohler Jr. in January 1953.

Beell was buried at Hillside Cemetery in Marshfield. Beell Stadium, home of the Marshfield Tigers football team, is named after him in 1941.

== Championships and accomplishments ==
- Cauliflower Alley Club
  - Posthumous award (2005)
- International Professional Wrestling Hall of Fame
  - Class of 2022
- Other titles
  - World Light Heavyweight Championship (3 times)
  - American Heavyweight Championship (1 time)
  - Northwest Championship (1 time)
  - Wisconsin Athletic Hall of Fame (1972)
  - World Middleweight Championship (1 time)
- Professional Wrestling Hall of Fame
  - Class of 2018
