= A. J. Freeley =

New Zealand wrestler

Personal information
- Born: Wellington, New Zealand

Professional wrestling career
- Ring name(s): A. J. Freeley; A. J. Freely
- Billed height: 1.80 m (5 ft 11 in)
- Billed weight: 104 kg (229 lb)
- Debut: 1989

A. J. Freeley or Freely is a semi-retired New Zealand professional wrestler. He competed throughout Australasia and in the United States during the 1990s, however, he is best remembered as the last NWA New Zealand Heavyweight Champion of Steve Rickard's NWA New Zealand. He won the belt from 3-time champion Bruno Bekkar in 1992, shortly before the promotion's close, and was billed as champion until the end of the decade.

== Career ==
A. J. Freeley was born in Wellington and made his professional debut in 1989. He began wrestling in Australia and the United States before returning to his native country in 1992. That same year, during the last months of Steve Rickard's NWA New Zealand, Freeley ended the two-year reign of Bruno Bekkar winning the NWA New Zealand Heavyweight Championship from him on 22 November 1992. He held the title until the close of NWA New Zealand but was continued to be billed as the national champion for the next seven years.

After the close of NWA New Zealand, then the country's only wrestling company, Freely went back to Australia. During the first half of 1993, he worked for Wrestling Down Under, a short-lived national company which also featured wrestlers from World Championship Wrestling and the World Wrestling Federation, and faced opponents such as Con Iakovidis, Bobby Blaze, Greg Smith and Ace Fenton. In 1998, AJ Freeley joined International Wrestling Australia (IWA) where he became a major star and won the promotion's heavyweight title three times before leaving the company in 2002. In recent years, he has been associated with Kiwi Pro Wrestling as have several other New Zealand wrestling veterans.

== Championships and accomplishments ==
- International Wrestling Australia
  - IWA Heavyweight Championship (3 times)
- NWA New Zealand
  - NWA New Zealand Heavyweight Championship (1 time, last)
