= Lofty Blomfield =

New Zealand wrestler (1908 – 1971)

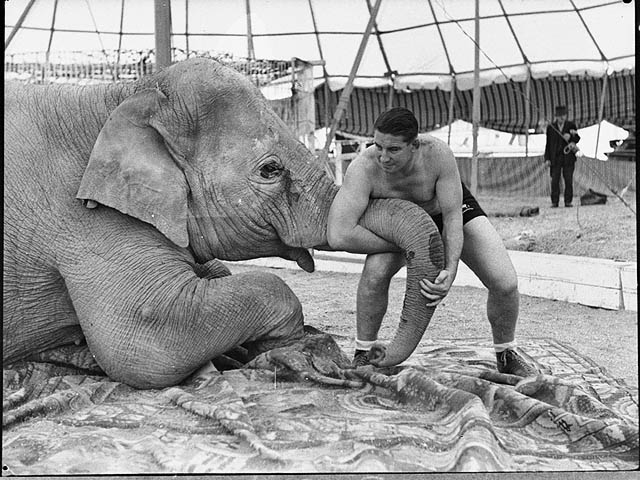
- Lofty Blomfield at Leichhardt Stadium in 1937

Personal information
- Born: 10 July 1908 Wellington, New Zealand
- Died: 29 June 1971 (aged 62) Whangārei, New Zealand

Professional wrestling career
- Ring name(s): Lofty Blomfield; Walter Browning
- Billed height: 6 ft 2 in (1.88 m)
- Billed weight: 224 lb (102 kg)
- Debut: 1932
- Retired: 1949

Meynell Strathmore Blomfield (18 July 1908 – 29 June 1971); also known as Lofty was a New Zealand professional wrestler, also known by another ring name; that of Walter Browning. Lofty was arguably the country's most popular wrestler during the 1930s and 40s. He competed primarily for promoter Walter Miller and the Dominion Wrestling Union for nearly 20 years where he defended the NWA New Zealand Heavyweight Championship against many of the top stars of the National Wrestling Association from 1936 until his retirement 1949. He is credited for inventing "The Octopus Clamp", an early version of the Scorpion Deathlock, and is the longest reigning heavyweight champion in the history of professional wrestling in New Zealand.

In addition to the national title, Blomfield also held the NWA British Empire/Commonwealth Championship and the NWA Australasian Heavyweight Championship. In 1938, he became the first New Zealander to wrestle for the NWA World Heavyweight Championship when he fought then champion Bronko Nagurski to a time-limit draw. He also had a successful amateur career winning the Auckland and New Zealand heavyweight titles prior to becoming a professional wrestler. Blomfield wrestled 490 matches in New Zealand and an estimated 1,200 matches in New Zealand, Australia, Fiji, Mexico, Canada and the United States between 1929 and 1949.

Blomfield became a successful hotelier in the years after his retirement, as Publican of the Whangarei Hotel, as well as being a noted sportsman. He was a member of the Whangarei Deep Sea Anglers Club, a founding member of both the Northland Trotting Club, the Whangarei Powerboat Association, and sponsored countless athletic organisations in Whangārei and Northland, most notably, Whangarei Inter-house rugby. He was also involved in numerous charity fundraisers and organizations, especially those involving mentally handicapped children, and served as president of the Intellectually Handicapped Children's Association. He later founded the Northland IHC and the Blomfield Special School and Resource Centre in Whangārei, the latter institution being named in his honour.

In 1990, Blomfield was officially inducted into the New Zealand Sports Hall of Fame. He is the first and only wrestler, amateur or professional, to be an inductee. He was also profiled in the Dictionary of New Zealand Biography and featured in a special editorial by the Northern Advocate in 1999. In 2009, Blomfield was named one of the "Top Ten New Zealand Born Wrestlers" by Fight Times Magazine and ranked #1 of the country's top ten favourite wrestlers by The New Zealand Herald.

== Early life and amateur career ==
Meynell Strathmore Blomfield was born in Wellington, New Zealand on 18 July 1908, to newspaper cartoonist John Collis Blomfield and Ann (Amy) Elizabeth Ellis. His uncle was William (Bill) Blomfield, the second mayor of Takapuna, (whom Blomfield Spa is named after). His family moved to Takapuna and, while still a child, he began working with horses there by visiting stables and doing track work for local trainers. Though Blomfield hoped to be a jockey, he grew too big and began racing motorbikes in grass track competitions. He left school after only two years of secondary education and travelled around the country working at various jobs and eventually settled in Waikaremoana, where he became a taxi proprietor. He also began playing senior rugby during this time, competing in Auckland, Gisborne, Murchison and Nelson, and was selected to play for Auckland against Waikato in 1929 but he declined to play so he could compete in amateur wrestling. Returning to Auckland in 1930, he participated in the first national amateur championships hosted by the New Zealand Wrestling Union and won the Auckland and New Zealand heavyweight titles.

Blomfield first married Agnes Myra Lawton at Wairoa on 14 July 1927 resulting in two children born of this marriage. The two divorced 10 years later in 1937 and Blomfield then married Lily May Balenzuela on the 2 June 1937. There was one child born of this union. A further marriage on the 20 February 1946 to Heather June Ingley (1921-2025) was to result in three children being born, a daughter and two sons. This marriage was dissolved in 1958. A further relationship with a Whangarei landowner was to eventuate with one female child being born. Blomfield was also to father a further two children. In all a total of 9 issue. Lofty and Heather were to later remarry.

== Professional career ==
=== Early career in Australia ===
Encouraged by his successes in the amateur ranks, and inspired by foreign wrestlers competing overseas, Blomfield decided to become a professional wrestler. He first travelled to Australia, in order to build up his experience, and worked in Sydney posing as a Canadian wrestler under the name Walter Browning. Though Blomfield had mixed success there, he won popularity with fans for his "non-stop aggressive style". He briefly returned to New Zealand in 1934, where he first wrestled under the name Lofty Blomfield, before heading to the United States. Walter Miller, then booking agent for the Dominion Wrestling Union, was so impressed by Blomfield that he managed to convince Blomfield to return to his native country to compete exclusively for his promotion. Miller was then bringing in major international talent to New Zealand but felt he needed a strong New Zealand-born wrestler as a legitimate challenger to these newcomers.

=== Arrival in the Dominion Wrestling Union ===
Blomfield was an instant success with crowds in New Zealand. His popularity was helped by announcer Gordon Hutter's vivid commentaries during radio broadcasts of his matches. His finishing move, "The Octopus Clamp", was especially popular with fans. During his early career, he was a rival with NWA British Empire/Commonwealth Champion Earl McCready. The two wrestled to a time-limit draw during his first year with the promotion. They would have a total of 28 bouts against each other with McCready winning 17, Blomfield 2, eight draws, and one no-contest when the referee was injured. Both men later become close friends during their career. By 1936, he had become the NWA New Zealand Heavyweight Champion. He briefly lost the title to Dean Detton in Auckland on 22 August 1938, but regained the belt five days later. He also defeated another claimant, Pat Fraley, on 10 September and won a championship tournament to become the undisputed champion a month later. He also held the NWA Australasian Heavyweight Championship which he lost to Ray Steele on 10 December 1938.

=== Showdown with Bronko Nagurski ===
That same year, Blomfield was scheduled to meet NWA World Heavyweight Champion Bronko Nagurski in a first-ever "champion vs. champion" match. Their match was to be one of the first international title defences to take place in the country and was expected to attract over 40,000 people. In negotiations with NWA promoters Toots Mondt, Lou Daro and Tony Stecher, Miller agreed to pay Nagurski the largest guarantee ever offered a boxer or wrestler in the Southern Hemisphere. Nagurski cancelled the trip at the last minute, however, and the two met in Vancouver instead where they fought to a time-limit draw on 17 March 1938. Blomfield was the first New Zealander to challenge for the NWA World title and would wrestle five world champions during his professional career in New Zealand.

=== Final years as NWA New Zealand Champion ===
Blomfield feuded with another NWA British Empire/Commonwealth Champion, John Katan, and defeated him for the title in Wellington on 7 August 1940. The following month, he lost the championship to Katan in Auckland. After New Zealand entered World War II, Blomfield enlisted in the New Zealand Army. He served both at home and abroad in Egypt reaching the rank of sergeant major prior to his discharge at the end of the war. His second wife, Lily May Balenzuela, died in 1945 and married a third time to Heather June Ingley on 20 February 1946. Shocker Shaw, New Zealand SAS soldier and founder of the Armed Offenders Squad, was friend of Blomfield's and often visited him when in Whangarei. Peter Fraser, a one-time Prime Minister of New Zealand, was also a supporter and several caucus meetings were stopped at 6pm, and resumed at 10am the following morning, so that members could attend wrestling events at the Town Hall when Blomfield was making a title defence.

Blomfield held the national title for well over a decade and retired as champion on 7 June 1949. Throughout his career, Blomfield vigorously defended professional wrestling and denied frequent charges that matches were rigged. In New Zealand alone, he had wrestled 490 matches with 272 wins, 105 losses and 113 draws; his combined amateur and professional bouts between 1929 and 1949 totaled an estimated 1,200 in New Zealand, Australia, Fiji, Mexico, Canada and the United States. He remains the longest reigning champion in New Zealand's wrestling history.

== Later years ==
After his retirement, Blomfield became a hotelier and took over the licence of the Whangarei Hotel where he and his wife Heather June were popular hosts in the area for many years. A well-known sportsman, Blomfield was a member of the Whangarei Deep Sea Anglers club and helped form the Northland Trotting Club and the Whangarei Powerboat Association. He also financed a large number of sporting competitions and organizations in Whangarei and Northland such as Whangarei Inter house rugby.

Blomfield was a lifelong supporter of many charities, especially those dealing with mentally handicapped children (one of his children was born mentally handicapped), and served as president of the Intellectually Handicapped Children's Association. He later founded the Northland IHC branch and established St. Nicholas Home and Blomfield Special School and Resource Centre. The school was later named in his honour. Among his more memorable fundraising ideas, Blomfield would start building "penny piles" on the counter of the hotel's public bar and any patrons would be obliged to offer spare pennies to the pile. Blomfield actually "camped out" in front of the penny piles to guard them from would-be thieves. These penny piles grew so large in size that when they were finally knocked down, for a small fee, the money gained for the IHC was substantial.

Blomfield died in Whangārei on 29 June 1971, at the age of 62. He was survived by his then wife, June, and two of their children as well as two others from his first marriage and one from a long relationship during the divorce to June

== Legacy ==
Nearly thirty years after his death, Blomfield was officially inducted into the New Zealand Sports Hall of Fame becoming the first and only wrestler, amateur or professional, to be included. A bronze bust of Blomfield was donated to the Hall of Fame by the Lofty Blomfield Family Trust. Inscribed are the words "Momentum requieris circumspice" ("If you seek a monument look about you"). Winston McCarthy, a popular radio commentator, dedicated an entire episode of his "Sportsman of the Week" programme to Blomfield. and was also profiled in the Dictionary of New Zealand Biography plus; featured in a special editorial by the Northern Advocate in 1999.

In September 2006, Blomfield was one of several Whangārei athletes including former All Black Ian Jones, Black Stick field hockey player Charlotte Harrison, and triathlete Sam Warriner portrayed in a community theatre production of "Way to Go" starring 320 students and 14 staff members of Hurupaki School. The play was directed by actress Jan Fisher, best known as Mrs. Doslic from the comedy television series Outrageous Fortune. In March 2009, Fight Times Magazine ranked Blomfield #3 of the "Top Ten New Zealand Born Wrestlers". That same month, Chris Rattue named Blomfield the country's #1 favourite wrestler in an article for The New Zealand Herald.

Blomfield's third wife, June, died in Whangārei in 2025.

== Championships and accomplishments ==
=== Amateur wrestling ===
- Auckland Provincial Championship (1 time)
- New Zealand Amateur Heavyweight Championship (1 time, first)

=== Professional wrestling ===
- Dominion Wrestling Union
  - NWA New Zealand Heavyweight Championship (1 time)
  - NWA British Empire/Commonwealth Championship (New Zealand version) (1 time)
  - NWA Australasian Heavyweight Championship (1 time)
- New Zealand Sports Hall of Fame
  - Class of 1990
