= NWA New Zealand Heavyweight Championship =

Wrestling singles title

New Zealand Heavyweight Championship
Statistics
- First champion(s): Gisborne Katene
- Final champion(s): A.J. Freeley

The NWA New Zealand Heavyweight Championship is the primary singles title in the NWA-affiliated wrestling promotion NWA New Zealand. It is the first heavyweight championship in New Zealand and one of the oldest in the world. It was first won by Gisborne Katene, who defeated Frank Findlay in 1919. The title has generally been defended in New Zealand, most often in Christchurch, Tauranga, Wellington and Auckland, New Zealand.

== Title history ==
| Wrestler: | Times: | Date: | Place: | Notes: |
|---|---|---|---|---|
| Gisborne Katene | 1 | 1919 | | Defeated Frank Findlay for the title, but later declared vacant. |
| Ike Robin | 1 | 17 March 1925 | Auckland, New Zealand | Title is vacated when Robin retires in 1926. He is credited as the first officially recognized heavyweight champion. |
| Tom Alley | 1 | 1929 | | |
| Stanley Pinto | 1 | 1930 | | May have defeated Alley in tournament final in Wellington on 23 November 1931. |
Title history unrecorded.
| George Walker | 1 | 1931 | | Walker retired on 23 November 1937, and the title was vacated. |
| Dean Detton | 1 | 22 August 1938 | Auckland, New Zealand | Defeated Lofty Blomfield for the title, but was later vacated in August 1938. |
| Lofty Blomfield | 1 | 10 September 1938 | Auckland, New Zealand | Defeated Pat Fraley for the title. He later defeated title claimant Dean Detton in Auckland on 27 August 1938, and won championship tournament to become undisputed champion in October 1938. Blomfield held the title for over a decade until his retirement on 7 June 1949. |
| Ken Kenneth | 1 | 22 June 1949 | | Originally awarded the title, Kenneth was stripped in June 1958 for not defending the belt for over a year. |
| Dick Hrstich | 1 | 11 June 1958 | Christchurch, New Zealand | Defeated Fred Wright for the title. Later vacated in October 1959 when Hrstich leaves the country. |
| Keita Meretana | 1 | 3 September 1959 | Tauranga, New Zealand | Defeated Lofty Binnie for the title. |
| Ken Kenneth | 2 | June 1960 | Auckland, New Zealand | Title vacated in October 1960 when Kenneth leaves the country. |
| Al Hobman | 1 | 26 October 1960 | Wellington, New Zealand | Defeated John DaSilva for the title. |
| Steve Rickard | 1 | 1963 | | |
| Peter Maivia | 1 | 3 August 1964 | Auckland, New Zealand | |
| Steve Rickard | 2 | 6 August 1964 | Wellington, New Zealand | |
| Al Hobman | 2 | 1964 | | |
| John DaSilva | 1 | 7 September 1967 | Wellington, New Zealand | Title declared vacant in 1979 when DaSilva begins wrestles overseas. |
| Siva Afi | 1 | 23 April 1978 | | Defeated John DaSilva in tournament final to win title. |
| Steve Rickard | 3 | 1983 | | |
Title is vacated.
| Rip Morgan | 1 | 8 September 1983 | Auckland, New Zealand | Defeated Samoan Joe in tournament final to win title. |
Title history unrecorded.
| Bruno Bekkar | 1 | September 1985 | | Won title in tournament final. |
| Johnny Garcia | 1 | | | |
| Bruno Bekkar | 2 | 12 December 1987 | Auckland, New Zealand | |
| Johnny Garcia | 2 | 26 November 1988 | | |
| Bruno Bekkar | 3 | 1990 | | |
| A.J. Freeley | 1 | 22 November 1992 | | Freeley is still billed as the heavyweight champion as of January 1999. |
