= George Walker (wrestler) =

Personal information
- Born: Ottawa, Ontario, Canada

Professional wrestling career
- Debut: 1911
- Retired: 23 November 1937

George Walker was a Canadian professional wrestler. Walker had his roots in amateur wrestling and was the runner-up at the 1911 Inter-Empire Championships, after losing to Britain's Stanley Vivian Bacon.

He is known for using the Boston Crab.

He was the first person to hold the NWA British Empire/Commonwealth Championship (New Zealand version) in 1929 after claiming it upon arrival in New Zealand.

He gained the NWA New Zealand Heavyweight Championship in 1931 and held it until he retired on 23 November 1937, and the title was vacated.

After his retirement, he sold a fitness guide book by mail order titled 'How to become a first-class wrestler and develop your body'.

== Championships and accomplishments ==
- Dominion Wrestling Union
  - NWA British Empire/Commonwealth Championship (New Zealand version)
- NWA New Zealand
  - NWA New Zealand Heavyweight Championship
