= Walter Miller (wrestler) =

Polish wrestler

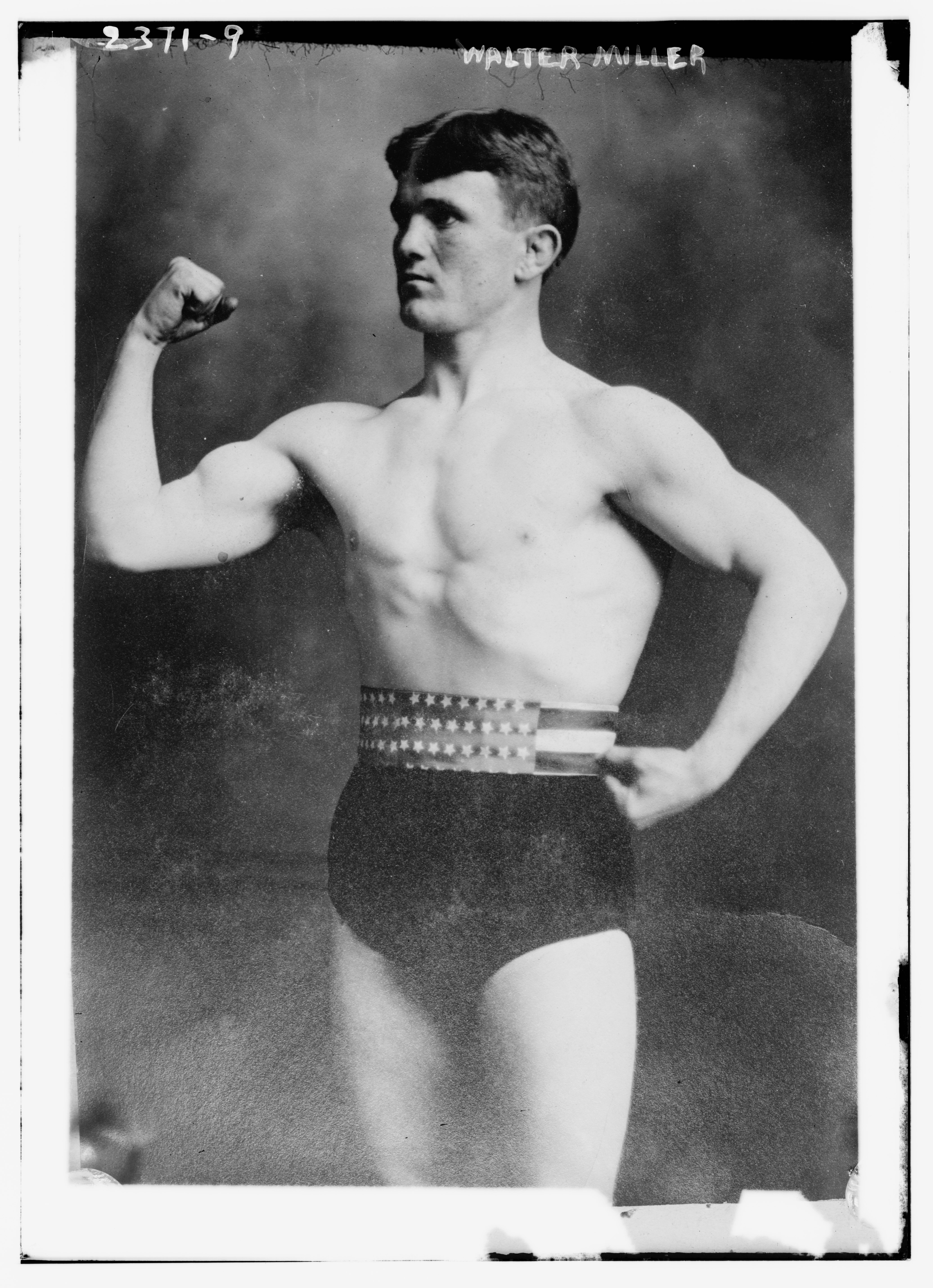
- Walter Miller c. 1915 – 1919

Personal information
- Born: Poland

Professional wrestling career
- Ring name(s): Walter Miller; Young Miller; Masked Marvel
- Billed from: Poland; Australia

Walter Miller was the middleweight wrestling champion in 1919.

== Biography ==
He was born in Poland and contracted rheumatic fever as a child.

== Championships and accomplishments ==
- Professional wrestling
  - Australasian Heavyweight Championship (1 time)
  - World Lightweight Championship (Europa-Version) (1 time)
  - World Middleweight Championship (2 times)
  - World Welterweight Championship (2 times)
  - World Lightweight Championship (1 time)
  - Wisconsin Heavyweight Championship (1 time)
