= Peter Sauer =

American professional wrestler (1900–1949)

Personal information
- Born: February 2, 1900 Norka, Russia
- Died: September 11, 1949 (aged 49) Valley County, Idaho, U.S.

Professional wrestling career
- Ring name(s): Masked Marvel; Peter Sauer; Pete Sauer; Ray Steele
- Billed height: 6 ft 0 in (1.83 m)
- Billed weight: 210 lb (95 kg)

Peter Sauer (February 2, 1900 – September 11, 1949), was an American professional wrestler, better known by the ring name Ray Steele. He was born and raised in Norka, a German colony in the Volga region of Russia, in 1900 before immigrating to Lincoln, Nebraska, in 1906. A highly skilled and dangerous catch wrestler, Steele was known for his extensive knowledge of submission holds.

After a successful amateur wrestling career, Steele then started wrestling in the carnivals, where he honed his catch wrestling skills. Upon turning pro, he relocated to California and became a regular workout partner of fellow catch wrestler Ad Santel. On 16 May 1934, he wrestled Orville Brown to a 30-minute draw. He gained some notoriety in 1936 when he faced heavyweight boxing contender Kingfish Levinsky in what is considered an early mixed martial arts (MMA) contest, which Steele won in 35 seconds. Steele's biggest accomplishment in the sport was winning the National Wrestling Association's World Heavyweight Championship from Bronko Nagurski in St. Louis, Missouri, on March 7, 1940. Steele would hold the belt for over a year before losing it back to Bronko Nagurski on March 11, 1941, in Houston, Texas.

Sauer served as a mentor and coach to many young stars, including Lou Thesz before his death of a heart attack in September 1949. Thesz considered Sauer to be one of the finest wrestlers he ever knew. A British wrestler would later re-use the ring name "Ray Steele" in the late 20th century, holding the British Heavyweight Championship.

== Championships and accomplishments ==
- George Tragos/Lou Thesz Professional Wrestling Hall of Fame
  - Class of 2002
- National Wrestling Association
  - World Heavyweight Championship (1 time)
- Midwest Wrestling Association (Ohio)
  - MWA World Heavyweight Championship (Ohio version) (1 time)
- Professional Wrestling Hall of Fame
  - Pioneer Era (Class of 2008)
- Wrestling Observer Newsletter
  - Wrestling Observer Newsletter Hall of Fame (Class of 1996)

== See also ==
- List of premature professional wrestling deaths
