= World Heavyweight Championship (Los Angeles version) =

Professional wrestling championship

World Heavyweight Championship (Los Angeles)
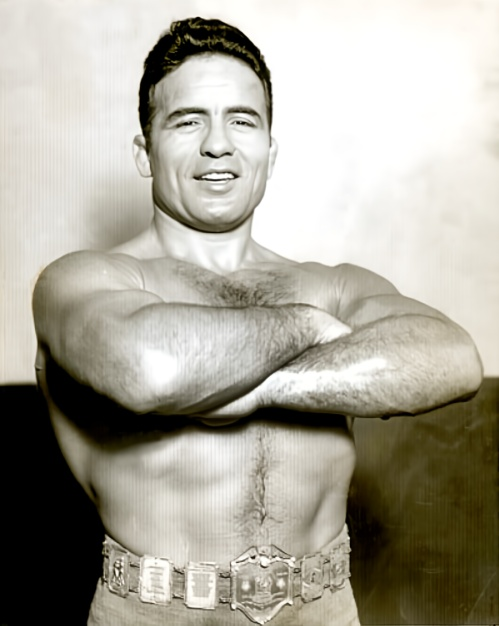
- Jim Londos, a 5-time World Heavyweight Champion, holds the record for most title reigns. He is one of four wrestlers to have been recognized by The Ring magazine as the "true world champion".

Details
- Promotion: California State Athletic Commission (Sanctioning body); AWA (1929–1931); LABO (1932–1949); NWA-LA (1949–1952); NWA (1949–1957); NWA-LA (1957–1959)
- Date established: 1929
- Date retired: 1959
Statistics
- First champion: Ed "Strangler" Lewis
- Final champion: Édouard Carpentier
- Most reigns: Jim Londos (5 times)
- Longest reign: Édouard Carpentier (1,459 days)
- Shortest reign: Vincent Lopez (second reign, ten days)

The World Heavyweight Championship was an American professional wrestling championship created and sanctioned by the California State Athletic Commission (CSAC). While the Commission sanctioned the title, it did not promote the events in which the Championship was defended. From 1929 until 1931, the American Wrestling Association (AWA) controlled the Championship. The AWA World Heavyweight Championship was recognized by the CSAC as the world championship until May 4, 1931, when the Commission refused to recognize Henri Deglane's victory over Ed "Strangler" Lewis in Montreal, Quebec, as the title had changed hands via disqualification rather than the traditional pinfall or submission. Lewis remained champion in California, and a separate lineage was created.

== Background ==
The championship was subsequently controlled by a group of Los Angeles-based promoters collectively known as the "California Combine" (Cal and Aileen Eaton, Hugh Nichols, Johnny Doyle, and Mike Hirsch). At various times in the mid-1930s, the title was unified with the NYSAC World Heavyweight Championship. Wrestlers who held both the New York and California versions – Dave Levin, Dean Detton, Bronko Nagurski and Jim Londos – were recognized by The Ring magazine as the "true world champion".

On October 12, 1935, Vincent Lopez defended the title against Man Mountain Dean at the Plaza Mexico in Mexico City, Mexico. The event, hosted by the newly established Empresa Mexicana de Lucha Libre (EMLL), was seen by a record 35,000 people. It is the highest drawing show in EMLL's history, and held the all-time attendance record in lucha libre for nearly 20 years.

In 1949, the California Combine joined the National Wrestling Alliance, and the championship became the main singles title for the NWA's Los Angeles wrestling territory. On May 21, 1952, Lou Thesz defeated Baron Michele Leone to unify the Los Angeles-version of the World Heavyweight Championship with the NWA World Heavyweight Championship, the principal championship recognized by the National Wrestling Alliance. With 25,256 fans present, it was the most attended show of the 1950s and the first-ever $100,000 gate in professional wrestling history. According to Pro Wrestling Illustrated, Thesz's victory over Leone had made him the closest any wrestler had gotten in the last half century to establishing an undisputed world championship in pro wrestling.

On July 24, 1957, Thesz defeated Édouard Carpentier in Montreal under controversial circumstances to win the NWA World Heavyweight Championship. The decision was challenged by several members of the NWA who continued to recognize Carpentier as World Heavyweight Champion. Several splinter titles were eventually created as a result. The Eatons decided to leave the NWA in October 1959 to promote their own world title under the North American Wrestling Alliance banner with Carpentier as their inaugural champion. The NWA-sanctioned championship was abandoned and replaced by the NAWA World Heavyweight Championship.

== Title history ==
=== Names ===
Name	Years
World Heavyweight Championship	1928–1929
AWA World Heavyweight Championship	1929–1931
World Heavyweight Championship	1931–1949
NWA Los Angeles Heavyweight Championship	1949–1952
NWA World Heavyweight Championship	1952–1957
NWA Los Angeles Heavyweight Championship	1957–1959

=== Reigns ===
Key
No.	Overall reign number
Reign	Reign number for the specific champion
Days	Number of days held
N/A	Unknown information
(NLT)	Championship change took place "no later than" the date listed
†	Championship change is unrecognized by the promotion
+	Current reign is changing daily

No.	Champion	Championship change			Reign statistics		Notes	Ref.
No.	Champion	Date	Event	Location	Reign	Days	Notes	Ref.
1	Ed "Strangler" Lewis	February 20, 1928	Live event	St. Louis, Missouri	1	311	Recognized as world champion in California after defeating title claimant Joe Stecher.	
2	Gus Sonnenberg	January 4, 1929	Live event	Boston, Massachusetts	1	705	In July 1929, more than 20 state athletic commissions withdrew their recognition of Sonnenberg as world champion for failing to meet "real" title contenders. He also declined an offer from the wrestling section of the National Boxing Association to enter a tournament to crown a new champion for the following year. The AWA World Heavyweight Championship was subsequently created for Sonnenberg by promoter Paul Bowser.	
3	Ed Don George	December 10, 1930	Live event	Los Angeles, California	1	124		
4	Ed "Strangler" Lewis	April 13, 1931	Live event	Los Angeles, California	2	N/A	Lewis lost the AWA World Heavyweight Championship to Henri Deglane by disqualification on May 4, 1931 in Montreal, QC but is still recognized as champion in California. He is also recognized as champion by the Illinois state athletic commission after defeating Wladek Zbyszko in Chicago on November 2, 1931.	
Championship history is unrecorded from 1931 to March, 1932.
5	Jim Londos	March, 1932 (n)	Live event	Unknown	1	N/A	Londos is recognized as world champion by the New York and Pennsylvania state athletic commissions after defeating Dick Shikat for the NYSAC World Heavyweight Championship in Philadelphia on June 6, 1930. He is also recognized as champion in Los Angeles, California as early as March 1932.	
Championship history is unrecorded from April, 1932 to May, 1933.
6	Jim Browning	May, 1933 (n)	Live event	Unknown	1	N/A	Browning is recognized as world champion by the New York and Pennsylvania state athletic commissions after defeating Ed "Strangler" Lewis for the NYSAC World Heavyweight Championship in New York City on February 20, 1933. He is also recognized as champion in Los Angeles, California in May 1933.	
7	Jim Londos	June 25, 1934	Live event	New York City, New York	2	324	On February 27, 1935, Londos was suspended by the California State Athletic Commission when he failed to appear for a scheduled title defense against Chief Little Wolf.	
—	Vacated	May 16, 1935	—	—	—	—	The championship was vacated when the CSAC officially withdrew its recognition of Londos as world champion after refusing to enter an international tournament.	
8	Vincent Lopez	July 24, 1935	Live event	Los Angeles, California	1	392	Lopez defeated Man Mountain Dean in a tournament final to win the vacant championship.	
9	Dave Levin	August 19, 1936	Live event	Los Angeles, California	1	42	Levin is recognized as world champion by the New York and Pennsylvania state athletic commissions after defeating Ali Baba for the NYSAC World Heavyweight Championship in Newark, New Jersey on June 12, 1936. His victory over Lopez in Los Angeles temporarily settles the dispute over who is the "real" world champion.	
†	Dean Detton	September 28, 1936	Live event	Philadelphia, Pennsylvania	1	3	Reign was not recognized by the CSAC due to the match being one-fall.	
10	Vincent Lopez	September 30, 1936	Live event	Los Angeles, California	2	10	Recognition is withdrawn by the CSAC on October 10, 1936, after deciding to recognize Dean Detton's victory over Dave Levin due to a working agreement with the Pennsylvania State Athletic Commission.	
11	Dean Detton	October 10, 1936	Live event	N/A	1	262	Officially recognized by the CSAC for his earlier victory over Dave Levin in Philadelphia. A rematch with Lopez is scheduled in Los Angeles for October 28, 1936, but Lopez suffers a leg injury during a match against Kimon Kudo four days earlier. Kudo takes Lopez's place in the match and is defeated by Detton. Detton ends Lopez's title claim by defeating him in Los Angeles on February 24 and March 3, 1937.	
12	Bronko Nagurski	June 29, 1937	Live event	Minneapolis, Minnesota	1	507		
13	Jim Londos	November 18, 1938	Live event	Philadelphia, Pennsylvania	3	740		
14	Sándor Szabó	November 27, 1940	Live event	Los Angeles, California	1	N/A	Awarded title after Londos fails to appear for a scheduled title defence. Londos is subsequently suspended by the CSAC from wrestling in California for 60 days.	
Championship history is unrecorded from November, 1940 to Jan, 1941.
15	Jim Londos	Jan, 1941 (n)	Live event	N/A	4	N/A	Reinstated as champion by the CSAC and defeated Sándor Szabó in Los Angeles on February 5, 1941, and again on February 12, 1941, to retain the title.	
†	Rube Wright	August 19, 1942	Live event	Los Angeles, California	1	N/A	Wright defeated The Swedish Angel in a tournament final to win the vacant championship. While promoted by Ray Fabiani as an "international" tournament to replace Jim Londos as world champion, the CSAC refuses to recognize Wright's world title claim but, by January 1943, acknowledges him as the California Heavyweight Champion. The title may also be known as the "Pacific Coast Heavyweight Championship" during this period. Wright is later recognized as world champion in New York.	
16	Jim Londos	Nov, 1942 (n)	Live event	Unknown	5	N/A	Londos reclaims the title in California. He is still billed as champion as of December 15, 1943, and as late as October 14, 1946. Recognition most likely withdrawn by the CSAC that same month when George Becker, holder of the Pacific Northwest-version of the world title, is recognized in the state.	
Championship history is unrecorded from 1942 to September 10, 1946.
17	George Becker	September 11, 1946	Live event	Portland, Oregon	1	91	Becker won the Pacific Coast Heavyweight Championship from Rebel Russell on May 1, 1946 and the California Heavyweight Championship from Tony Martinez on May 22, 1946. He is recognized as world champion by the CSAC after defeating Babe Sharkey for the Pacific Northwest-version of the world title in Portland, Oregon on September 11, 1946.	
18	Enrique Torres	December 11, 1946	Live event	Los Angeles, California	1	1,442		
19	Baron Michele Leone	November 22, 1950	Live event	Los Angeles, California	1	546		
20	Lou Thesz	May 21, 1952	Live event	Los Angeles, California	1	N/A		
—	Unified	May 21, 1952	Live event	Los Angeles, California	—	—	Lou Thesz defeated Baron Michele Leone to unify the Los Angeles-version of the World Heavyweight Championship with the NWA World Heavyweight Championship.	
†	Whipper Billy Watson	March 15, 1956	Live event	Toronto, Ontario	1	239	Won the title via countout.	
†	Lou Thesz	November 9, 1956	Live event	St. Louis, Missouri	2	217		
21	Edouard Carpentier	June 14, 1957	Live event	Chicago, Illinois	1	1,459	Carpentier was awarded the title when Lou Thesz could not continue the match due to a back injury. On July 24, Thesz won a rematch against Édouard Carpentier by disqualification in Montreal. The NWA initially continued to recognize Carpentier as the champion, but voided any recognition of Carpentier as champion when he withdrew the claim for the title when Montreal promoter Eddie Quinn left the NWA in August 1958. Several NWA territories, including California, disputed this decision and continued to recognize Carpentier as world champion eventually resulting in the creation of several splinter titles.	
—	Deactivated	October 1959	—	—	—	—	Cal and Aileen Eaton withdrew from the NWA in October 1959, and the title was replaced by the NAWA World Heavyweight Championship.	
