= Danno O'Mahony =

Irish professional wrestler (1912 – 1950)

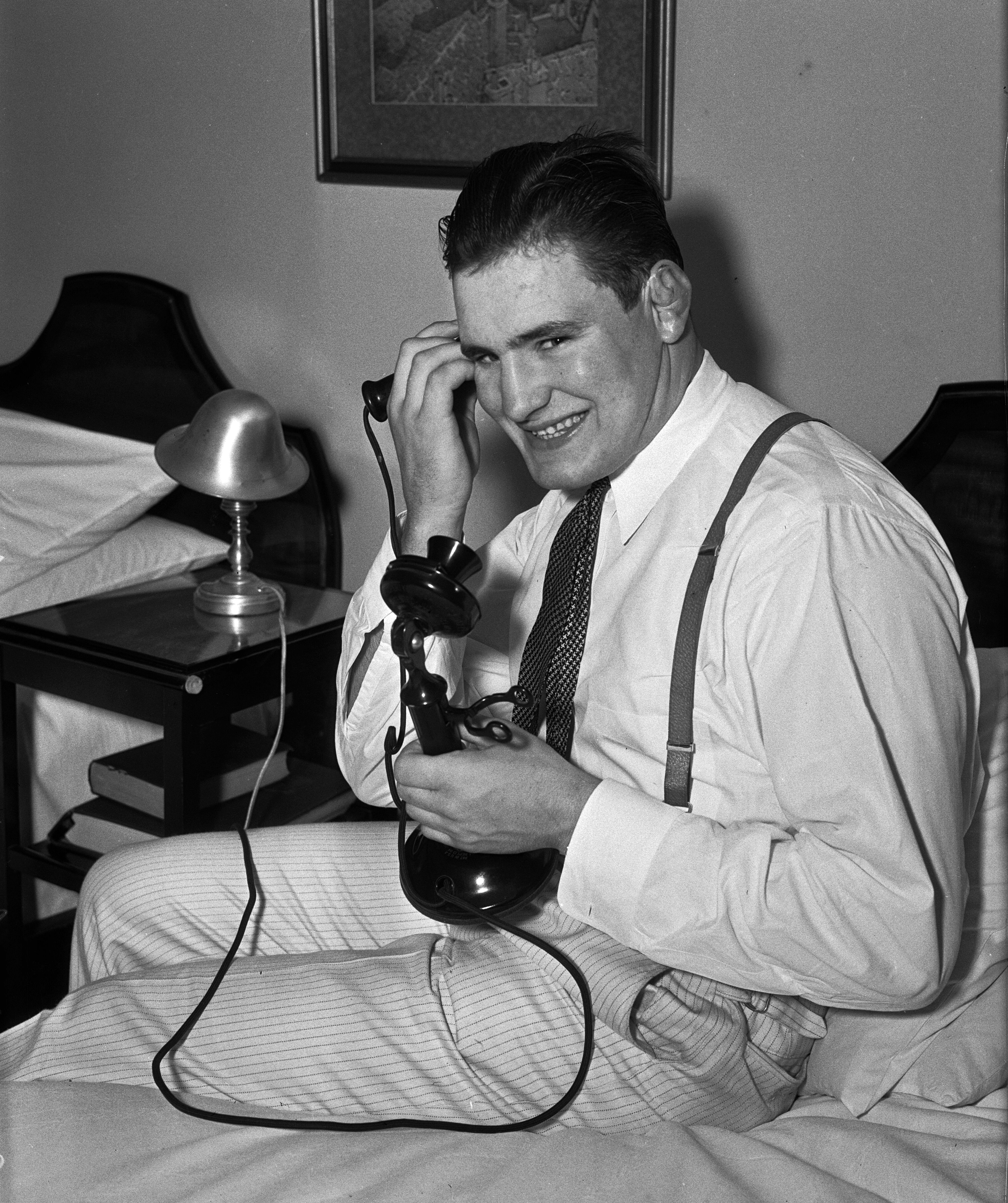
- Danno O'Mahony in 1935

Personal information
- Born: 9 September 1912 Ballydehob, County Cork, Ireland
- Died: 3 November 1950 (aged 38) near Port Laoise, County Laois, Ireland

Professional wrestling career
- Ring name: Danno O'Mahony
- Billed from: Dreenlomane, Ireland
- Trained by: Paul Bowser
- Debut: 1934
- Retired: 1948

Daniel Michael O'Mahony (9 September 1912 – 3 November 1950) was an Irish professional wrestler who enjoyed a brief but meteoric rise to massive popularity in the mid-1930s following a successful introduction to the Boston regional wrestling scene. His surname was usually spelt "O'Mahoney" during his wrestling career. His signature move was the Irish Whip, which acquired its name due to its association with O'Mahony. O'Mahony would find success as a wrestler becoming the National Wrestling Association's World Heavyweight Champion. Professional Wrestling journalist and historian Dave Meltzer has referred to O'Mahony as "the first true ethnic super-draw" in American professional wrestling.

== Family ==
The son of Daniel O'Mahony (1869–?), and Susan O'Mahony (1878–1928), née Driscoll, Daniel Michael O'Mahony was born in Ballydehob, County Cork, Ireland, on September 9, 1912.

He married Julia Esther Burke (1908-1965) in 1935. They had one son, Daniel, born c.1939.

== Professional wrestling career ==
In 1933, while serving in the Irish Defence Forces, O'Mahony distinguished himself as an athlete, setting military records for the hammer throw and the 56-lb. weight throw which were not broken until the 1990s. He also boxed and wrestled, with his repertoire relying heavily on standup grappling and throws.

O'Mahony was brought to America in 1934 by Boston promoter Paul Bowser. Bowser was hoping to create a new Irish star for the ethnic marketplace in New York and New England, in the tradition of 19th-century champion William Muldoon. While searching for the appropriate candidate, Bowser was less interested in their wrestling skills as their looks and physique. An offer to two-time Olympic champion Patrick O'Callaghan was rejected, but the Irishman recommended O'Mahony. Using his Boston connections, Bowser obtained O'Mahony's release from army service. A crash course in wrestling training followed.

=== Early career ===
O'Mahony's first professional match was in December 1934, against the famed Ed "Strangler" Lewis, but after losing the first fall of a 2-of-3 match in just five minutes, O'Mahony did not return to the ring. Nevertheless, Bowser was satisfied and brought O'Mahony to America. He signed O'Mahony to a $100,000 contract, and promoted him as the strongest man in the world, and the Irish champion who was looking for international competition. His first American match, against the villainous Ernie Dusek, degenerated into a two-on-one brawl against Ernie and his brother Rudy. When O'Mahony knocked both men down, along with the referee, the crowd cheered.

Bowser had O'Mahony win 49 consecutive matches, all the while building to a title shot against Jim Londos. O'Mahony's most painful win was an April 1935 match against Dick Shikat. Shikat, who had been having professional conflicts with the promoters, ignored the script and roughed up the rookie, breaking two ribs. Because of Shikat's tactics, O'Mahony's planned win became a win by disqualification.

=== Promotion consolidation ===
After several years of professional conflict, Bowser and the other major rival promoters were working together by late 1933, with most of the territories agreeing to support Londos as their main world champion. As wrestling's leading attraction, Londos had an enviable deal with the promotional cadre that included a $50,000 payoff were he to lose the championship. Despite their working arrangement, each promoter was grooming his own preferred heir to Londos' throne. Besides O'Mahony, various wrestlers including Chief Little Wolf, Orville Brown, Lou Thesz, Bronko Nagurski, Daniel Boone Savage and Everett Marshall were all waiting to get the call.

After facing a string of top names, such as Man Mountain Dean, Gus Sonnenberg and Henri DeGlane, the long-expected O'Mahony-Londos match was announced. Londos was not eager to lose, but a reported $20,000 bonus on top of his contractual payoff was too big a sum to refuse. On 27 June 1935, at Boston's Fenway Park, Danno beat Londos to win the New York State Athletic Commission World Heavyweight Championship, which was also recognized by the National Wrestling Association. Londos, who hadn't lost an official match in six years, was quoted as saying, "I knew after the first five minutes I would have to be lucky to win. The kid is green, but with his strength, I believe he can beat any man in the world. And when I took the bout, the New York people told me I had nothing to fear! I wish I knew as much before I signed... and this bout would have never taken place."

Footage of a professional wrestling match between Danno O'Mahony and Chief Little Wolf in Yankee Stadium, New York City, USA in 1935.

His first title defence was against Chief Little Wolf at Yankee Stadium, New York, on 8 July 1935. O'Mahoney eventually won the match, by a pinfall, after 28 minutes and 23 seconds. He went on to win the American Wrestling Association World Heavyweight Championship, defeating Ed Don George at Boston's Braves Field on 30 July 1935. The win unified the three major titles at that time, but the result was controversial. O'Mahony had been knocked out of the ring, but the inexperienced referee (boxer James Braddock) failed to make the count. A rematch in September became O'Mahony's 70th straight win since arriving in America.

=== Title reign and drop in popularity ===
On 7 October 1935, O'Mahony married Esther Burke, whom he'd met in Boston. On 11 October, O'Mahony defeated the only man who held a win over him: Ed "Strangler" Lewis. Word of their London bout had appeared in the Boston newspapers by this time. However, O'Mahony's title reign was turning into less than the roaring success promoter Bowser had hoped for, with the young champion being booed and attendance for many of his matches slumping. Promoters were also beginning to become disenchanted with the "unified title" arrangement, since that meant only one promoter at a time could book the champion.

Rival promoter Billy Sandow publicly mocked O'Mahony's lack of wrestling ability and offered $5,000 if he would face Sandow's choice, Everett Marshall. To quiet Sandow, Bowser responded by offering a match with two of his other wrestlers: Ed "Strangler" Lewis or Jim Browning, both of whom had feared reputations as "shooters."

On 13 November, O'Mahony wrestled to a draw with Ernie Dusek, his first non-win. He was also having visa problems, and there was speculation about how long he might remain in the country before having to drop the title. Bowser arranged for an angle in which Canadian wrestler Yvon Robert taunted O'Mahony during a match, then rushed the ring after the match to pin and knock out the champion. The staged incident made an instant star of Robert.

Touring the country in early 1936, the underskilled O'Mahony started encountering "doublecrosses" from other promoters. Informed that an opponent planned to "hook" and injure O'Mahony in their match, the champion and his manager simply left the arena. He was stripped of his title in the Texas jurisdiction, and the National Wrestling Association soon did the same.

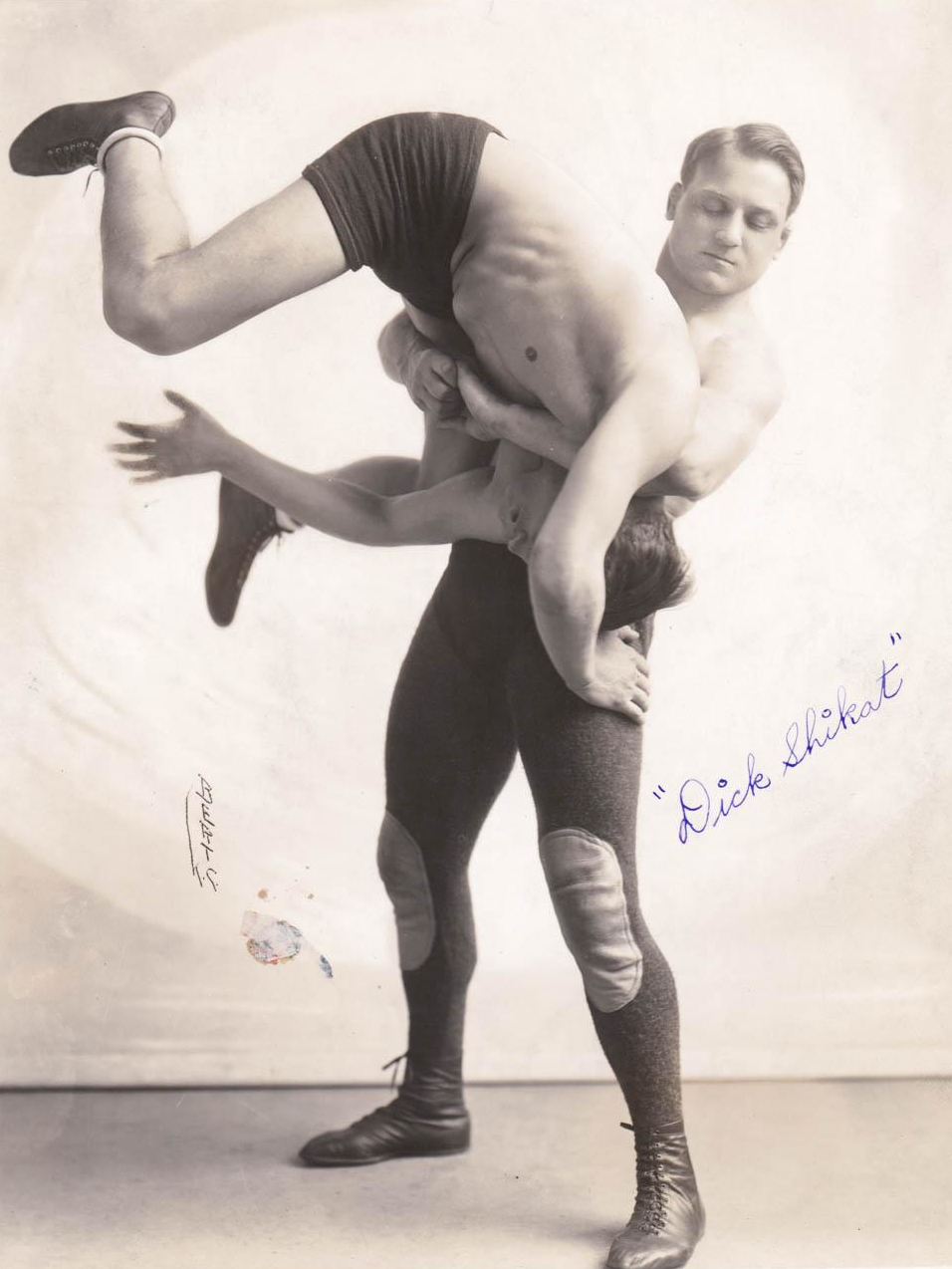
O'Mahoney's March 1936 match with Dick Shikat (pictured above in long trunks) was not only disastrous for his own career, but for professional wrestling in America in general, as audience attendance fell for many years in the aftermath.

On 2 March 1936, O'Mahony lost his National Wrestling Association World Heavyweight Championship to Dick Shikat at New York's Madison Square Garden. Shikat used his wrestling ability to genuinely hurt and punish O'Mahony, who tried to quit twice before the finish of the match. Shikat reportedly made the decision on his own, and following the win, immediately put his title up for "sale" to the various promoters. He eventually reached a deal with Sandow. Bowser, who held a management contract on Shikat, retaliated by booking him into various states without informing him. When Shikat failed to appear, he was frequently suspended by the local commissions. In the aftermath of this, the behind-the-scenes negotiations were exposed in a court case, no fewer than five wrestlers were being billed as champions, and the pseudo-sport's popularity fell.

O'Mahony continued to be recognised as champion by the AWA in Boston, though his own popularity was on the wane and he was planning a return to Ireland. Before one of his matches, the Boston Globe printed a headline reading "Expect Danno to Lose His Crown at Garden Tonight." That prediction proved premature, but only by three weeks. Before the largest Montreal wrestling crowd in a quarter-century (10,000+), O'Mahony lost the belt to Yvon Robert on 16 July 1936. Two days later, O'Mahony set sail for home. He told reporters that he'd been cheated of the title, which allowed him to bill himself as the AWA champion upon his return.

=== Later career ===
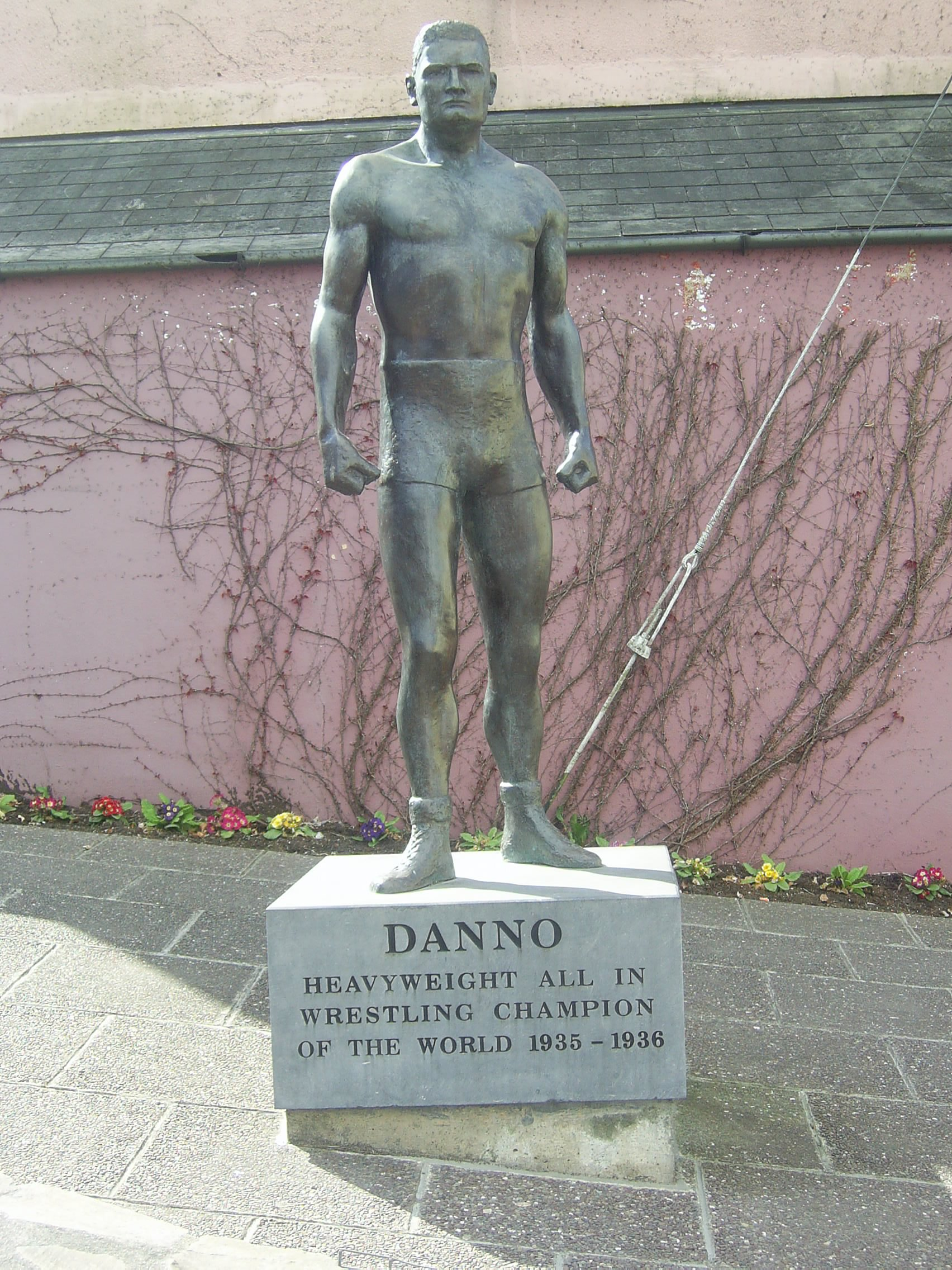
Statue created by sculptor James MacCarthy, commemorating Danno O'Mahony in his home town of Ballydehob, County Cork.

O'Mahony was met by thousands of supporters who greeted him at the dock and lined the streets. In August, he matched his own army record for the 56-pound weight throw. Over the next two months, he won several "title defenses" in Ireland, England and Scotland. By October, he was back in the United States, but under the reduced status of "title claimant." A series of rematches with the new AWA champion were postponed when Robert broke his leg. By 1937, O'Mahony was starting to suffer draws or losses, including losing regional title matches against Everett Scott and Lou Thesz. His won-lost record worsened in 1938, and he went back to Ireland to promote pro wrestling there. The effort was short-lived, and O'Mahony again returned to America to fulfill his contract with Bowser. By this point, he was mostly used as a "name" opponent who lost to the top wrestlers.

O'Mahony moved to Los Angeles, where he ran a restaurant and wrestled locally. He joined the Army during World War II. After the war, he wrestled in various parts of the US from 1945–1948. He returned permanently to Ireland in September 1950.

== Death ==
He died from injuries suffered in a road accident near Port Laoise, County Laois, in Ireland, on 3 November 1950.

== Championships and accomplishments ==
- American Wrestling Association (Boston)
  - AWA World Heavyweight Championship (1 time)
- National Wrestling Association
  - NWA World Heavyweight Championship (1 time)
- New York State Athletic Commission
  - NYSAC World Heavyweight Championship (1 time)
- Other Titles
  - World Heavyweight Championship (original version) (1 time)

== Legacy ==
In 2002, the wrestling promotion Irish Whip Wrestling was named in his honour.

== See also ==
- List of premature professional wrestling deaths
