= Sam Cordovano =

American football player (1906–1995)

Personal information
- Born: December 10, 1906; Adams, Pennsylvania
- Died: July 13, 1995 (aged 88); Hilton Head, South Carolina
- Listed height: 5 ft 11 in (1.80 m)
- Listed weight: 185 lb (84 kg)

Career information
- College: Georgetown

Career history
- Newark Tornadoes (1930)

Samuel Cordovano (December 10, 1906 – July 13, 1995) was an American collegiate and professional football player, coach, professional wrestler and co-founder of the Buffalo Bills of the All-America Football Conference (AAFC). He is enshrined in the Georgetown University Sports Hall of Fame.

== Early life ==
Cordovano's parents emigrated from Serradifalco, Sicily. His father, Colegio Corduana (changed later to Cordovano), a miner, settled with his wife, Elizabeth, and son, James in the Pennsylvania coal mining region. There, Sam was born in December 1906. While in Pennsylvania, the elder Cordovano taught himself the butcher trade and then in the early 1920s moved his family to Buffalo, where the family opened and operated a butcher shop.

== College football career ==
After a stand-out athletic career at Canisius prep school (including selection to numerous Buffalo All-City Football Teams, Cordovano enrolled at Georgetown University and played football under the tutelage of Lou Little There, Cordovano made varsity in 1927 and continued to letter all 3 years of his college career (1928, 1929) while playing a combination of guard and tackle on both offense and defense.

Cordovano earned numerous accolades during his three seasons at Georgetown, including being named team captain in 1929. That same year, Cordovano earned Georgetown's "Most Valuable Player" award as well as an All-American Mention. During the Hoya's 1929 campaign, storied sports journalist, Richards Vidmer had this to say about Cordovano: "He is six feet tall and weighs about 183 pounds. He is fast, strong, and powerful; hits hard, is a deadly tackler, smart and knows more football than 90 per cent of those playing the game today. He can play center, guard or tackle. He is our (Georgetown's) whole defense, and only one team scored on us to date and that was by a pass."

Throughout Cordovano's tenure in college football, Georgetown's record was 21 wins, 5 losses, 2 ties. Cordovano was inducted into the Georgetown Athletic Hall of Fame in 1953.

== Professional football career ==
Cordovano played one season in the NFL with the Newark Tornadoes in 1930.

== Collegiate coaching career ==
After a successful 1929 season at Georgetown, Lou Little accepted the head football coach position at Columbia University. Little promptly hired Cordovano as his offensive line coach in 1930, a position that Cordovano held through the 1943 season while becoming one of the most renowned assistant football coaches in the country.

During Cordovano's time at Columbia, the Lions defeated Stanford, 7-0, in the 1934 Rose Bowl. Considered to be one of the greatest upsets in Rose Bowl history, the game's lone score came on a fake reverse and hand-off from MVP Cliff Montgomery to halfback, Al Barabas, who went untouched for the 17 yard score.

During Cordovano's tenure at Columbia, the Lions held a record of 61 wins, 51 losses, 9 ties.

== Professional wrestling career ==
Cordovano began taking professional wrestling matches in the early 1930s as a way to make money during the football offseason. Known for his football bonafides and business-like demeanor on the mat, Cordovano achieved success in promotions in New York, Boston, Buffalo, Pittsburgh, and Toronto. Cordovano frequently grappled with wrestling legends, including Ed "Strangler" Lewis, Jim Browning, Ed Don George and Jim Londos.

Throughout Cordovano's 6-year professional wrestling career, he had several high-profile matches. On March 27, 1933, Cordovano challenged Jim Browning for the NYSAC World Heavyweight Championship in front an audience of over 5,000 at the 71st Regiment Armory in New York. Cordovano also challenged for other venerated wrestling titles, including Boston's AWA World Heavyweight Title held by Ed Don George on June 28, 1933, and the NWA World Heavyweight Title held by Jim Londos on March 2, 1934.

Cordovano's professional wrestling career includes 61 wins, 16 losses, 52 draws on record.

Cordovano became the matchmaker of the Buffalo Sporting Club in August 1936, replacing Hans Furst.

== All-America Football Conference ==
In 1943, Cordovano organized a group of local businessmen which applied for a Buffalo franchise in the NFL, along with groups from Los Angeles and San Francisco. However, in April 1944, the NFL owners voted to table the franchise applications until after WWII. Shortly thereafter, Chicago Tribune editor, Arch Ward, began the process of forming a rival league: the All-America Football Conference. Cordovano was treasurer of the new league and in charge of player personnel. By December 1945, Cordovano, had 37 players signed-up to play for the Buffalo franchise, including Paul Governali, a Columbia All-American.

The AAFC's inaugural season, 1946, included teams in Los Angeles (backed by actors Bing Crosby and Don Ameche), San Francisco, New York (backed by Eleanor Gehrig), Brooklyn, Baltimore (backed by Gene Tunney) Miami, Cleveland (backed by Paul Brown) and Chicago. Cordovano resigned his ownership position in Buffalo and his position as league treasurer, to focus on other business opportunities, just prior to the inaugural season. He was replaced as treasurer by Mrs. Gehrig. When the League folded in 1949, the AAFC Baltimore Colts, San Francisco 49ers and Cleveland Browns joined the NFL. The AAFC's Buffalo Bills, however, disbanded; many of their players were drafted by other teams in the NFL.

== Later life and death ==
In 1950, Cordovano founded The Cordovano Co., a precision tool business and metrology lab. He was an avid golfer and was a member of The Sea Pines Club in Hilton Head, South Carolina where he retired. Cordovano died in 1995 in Hilton Head.
