= Dave Levin =

American wrestler (1913–2004)

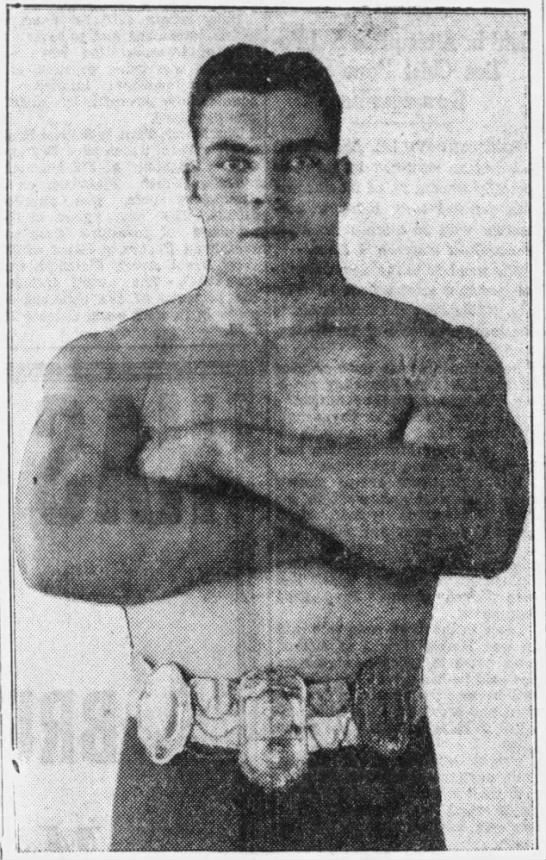
- April 1936 advertisement of Dave Levin wearing an unknown championship belt

Personal information
- Born: George William Wenzel; February 27, 1913 Brooklyn, New York, U.S.
- Died: August 25, 2004 (aged 91)
- Education: Bushwick High School

Professional wrestling career
- Ring name(s): Dave Levin; Butcher Boy; Jamaica Butcher Boy
- Trained by: Bothner’s Gym; Herb Freeman; Bobby Managoff Sr.
- Retired: 1954

George William Wenzel (February 27, 1913 – August 25, 2004) was an American professional wrestler and World Heavyweight Champion who was active in the early portion of the twentieth century, best known under the ring name Dave Levin.

== Introduction to professional wrestling ==
Dave Levin made his debut on November 1, 1934, defeating Sammy Gold in 24 seconds. The Brooklyn Times Union said that Levin was a "wrestling prodigy" discovered by Lloyd Rose. Rose stated that Levin is "a miniature of the old Russian Lion, George Hackenschmidt." Jack Pfeffer praised Levin but that the discovery was really Mrs. Rose and not her husband. Mrs. Rose is said to have visited a local butcher shop in Jamaica for her husband’s favorite meal, lamb chops. She noticed Levin and then told Lloyd who checked Levin out. Lloyd then sent Levin to Pfeffer who told Herb Freeman to take Levin to Bothner’s Gym to try him out. After an hour Freeman told Pfeffer they had a "real find". Levin would remain undefeated for his first 28 matches before losing to Leo Wallick on December 28, 1934.

In 1935 when Jess McMahon began promoting Luna Park in Coney Island, Dave Levin was his early main event wrestler often drawing over 2,000 fans for each show. On May 5, 1936, Dave Levin made his Madison Square Garden debut defeating Chief Big Wolf in 8 minutes and 41 seconds.

In his first two years of professional wrestling, Levin was considered a light-heavyweight wrestler often challenging for the World's Light Heavyweight Championship. On May 6, 1936, it was announced in the Brooklyn Times Union that Levin would be a "full-fledged heavyweight" prior to a match with another heavyweight contender, Hans Schacht, who was the top contender for the New York State Athletic Commission World Heavyweight Championship. Levin would defeat Schacht and earn a championship match against Ali Baba

== First World's Heavyweight Championship reign ==
Dave Levin first challenged Ali Baba on May 13, 1936 at the Ridgewood Grove Athletic Club in Brooklyn, New York. The match was a disappointing loss for Levin who gave up 18 pounds to the shorter but stockier Ali Baba. Baba defeated Levin in 10 minutes and 40 seconds. Levin was questioned about the loss but was undeterred. He claimed it motivated him more to work harder and rack up more victories quickly to earn another shot against Ali Baba.

On June 5, 1936, promoter Max Joss promised the winner of Dave Levin versus Salvatore Balbo the opportunity to face Ali Baba for the World's Heavyweight Championship at a large baseball park as opposed to his usual Broadway Arena show. Levin would defeat Balbo on June 8 to earn his second chance against Ali Baba.

However prior to that outdoor stadium show, Dave Levin substituting for Hans Schnabel faced Ali Baba in Newark, New Jersey, on June 12 at the Meadowbrook Field. He would defeat Ali Baba via disqualification after 21 minutes of action when Baba kicked him into the groin. At 23 years of age, Dave Levin became the youngest World's Heavyweight Champion at that time. The decision was protested by Ali Baba and title recognition was in limbo but the next day, the New Jersey State Athletic Commission would rule in favor of Dave Levin being the new World's Heavyweight Champion citing that "the referee is the sole arbiter of the decision of a match." Baba would continue to claim the World's Title in some states such as Michigan, Baba's adopted home state which labeled the championship as "clouded". The most important state for the recognition to mean anything was New York and it was clear Dave Levin was considered to be their World Champion. Promoter Nick Londes of Detroit immediately planned a rematch between Levin and Baba for early July. (Until the time of the National Wrestling Alliance in the late 1940s, almost all World title claims were fractured and disjoined at best.) Some wrestlers would simply claim the name, others would be given recognition by their state or by a specific promoter. At the time of his victory, Levin also shared claims with Ali Baba, Vincent Lopez and Everett Marshall. These champions were generally territorial based on which manager and promoter held interest in a town such as Lou Daro in California, Al Haft in the mid-west or Toots Mondt, Jack Curley and Ray Fabiani in the north-east. Levin's claim was generally legitimized by following the timeline of Jim Londos, considered undisputed World Champion, being defeated by Danno O'Mahoney, who was then defeated by Dick Shikat, who was next defeated by Ali Baba, to Dave Levin who defeated Ali Baba. Though some promoters who recognized different World Champions would simply state that Levin was "the wrestling champion owned by the trust" and "not the real champion or even close to the best."

Although this was recognized by the New York State Athletic Commission as the World Heavyweight Championship, Levin enjoyed recognition in several states including Pennsylvania, Georgia, Iowa, Missouri, Texas, Florida and New Jersey. In California, recognition was considered as the "Eastern States" World Heavyweight Champion whereas California, Oregon, Washington and Utah recognized their own World Heavyweight Championship (Pacific Northwest) which was held by Vincent Lopez. Lopez was having his own problems with his claim to the World title as his victory the previous year to Man Mountain Dean was disputed due to Lopez allegedly breaking the rules. Lopez cited Levin's title victory as the catalyst to resolve any disputes with Man Mountain Dean who also saw Levin's victory and decided to hold off his own retirement until his no holds barred match with Lopez occurred. Both immediately claimed they would welcome an undisputed title match with Levin after their issue was settled. Levin agreed to come to California, specifically Los Angeles on July 8, 1936, to discuss a potential unification match. Lopez would go on to defeat Man Mountain Dean and set the stage for a unification bout. During the time between their meeting, Levin would embark on a cross country defense of his championship. In the states that accepted Levin as champion he became known as the "trust buster" as he had aspirations of unifying all the World Championships.

On June 18, the New Jersey Athletic Commission reversed their ruling from June 13 by stating that because New Jersey was not part of any coalition or group that recognizes a singular World Champion, they had no legal authority to announce the match that took place in their state as being a World title bout. Despite this, several states continued to recognize Levin as the World Champion as Levin had already promised to go on a nationwide tour with the purpose of unifying all the disputed branches of the World title including the one in California where it was already announced Levin would face Vincent Lopez in a unification match for July 26 in Los Angeles.

To add more confusion to the World title picture, Michigan which originally did not recognize Levin retroactively did so on June 27 when they announced Levin would defend his championship on July 3 in Detroit. In truth, Ali Baba lost whatever protesting claim he had to Everett Marshall the previous night in Columbus, Ohio.

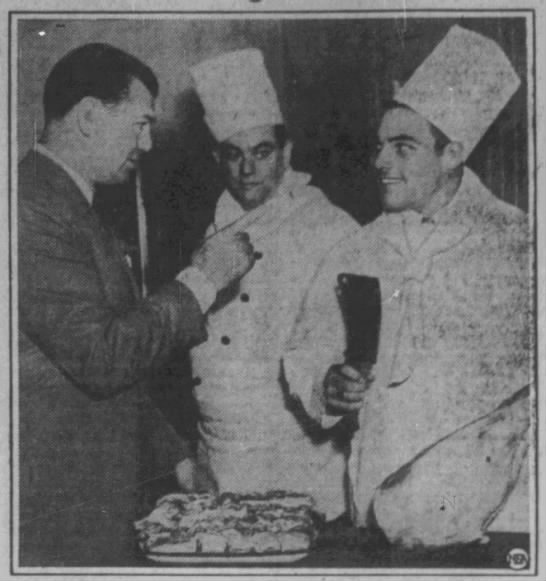
Dave Levin (far right) as a special guest with Jack Dempsey (far left) and his chef (center) at Dempsey's restaurant June 1936

Levin's first title defense would come on June 29 in Philadelphia, Pennsylvania, against Joe Savoldi. Levin would win in 28 minutes and 21 seconds.

His next defense would come on July 1 against Jack Washburn in Cleveland, Ohio, where Levin would win via pinfall.

On July 2, Levin would travel to Canada to defend his World title when he defeated Howard Cantowine in Toronto in straight falls.

He would again defeat Jack Washburn to defend his title in Detroit on July 3. The Detroit Free Press stated "whether his claim is legitimate or not, he certainly looks the part. He looks like the perfect athlete."

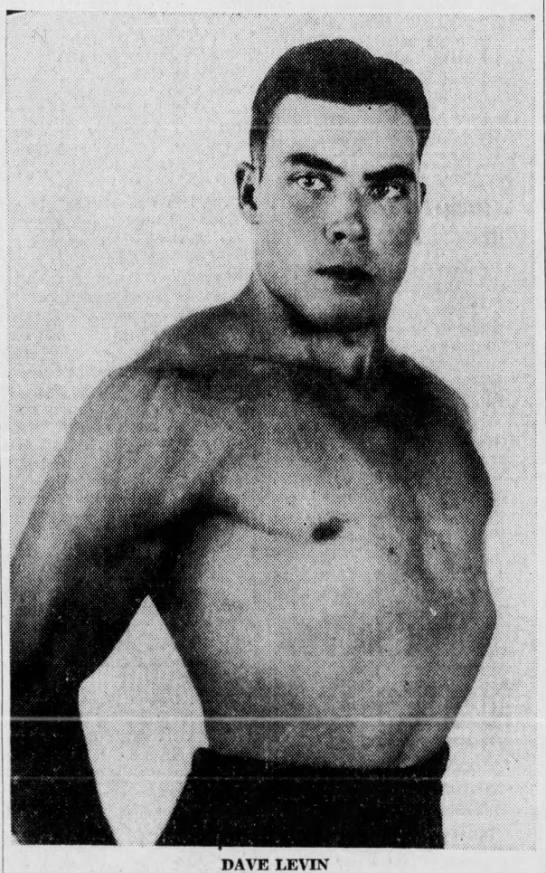
Promotional picture of Dave Levin in July 1936 showing his physique

On July 6, Levin defended his World Championship in Chicago, Illinois, when he defeated Chief Little Wolf in 16 minutes and 40 seconds.

Levin would move on to Minneapolis, Minnesota, to defend his championship against Tom Marvin on July 7.

On July 8, Toots Mondt told the St. Louis Globe-Democrat that Dave Levin would agree to face Everett Marshall to unify their World Title claims in the city that "provides the best offer" roughly around late August or early September. One requirement from Mondt though is a $6,000 guarantee for Levin's appearance.

Levin would make his next appearance in Kansas City, Missouri, where he would face former World's Heavyweight Champion Gus Sonnenberg. After this match he would finally head to California in preparation of his unification match with Vincent Lopez.

Dave Levin's first match on the west coast was a straight falls victory to defend his championship against Howard Cantonwine in San Diego on July 14.

His next match was the next evening against Joe Savoldi, considered a "warm up" to his match with Lopez. The next day the Los Angeles times panned the actual match as "mediocre" but could not deny Levin's star power citing his "appearance here more than doubled the gate at the local bone-bending emporium."

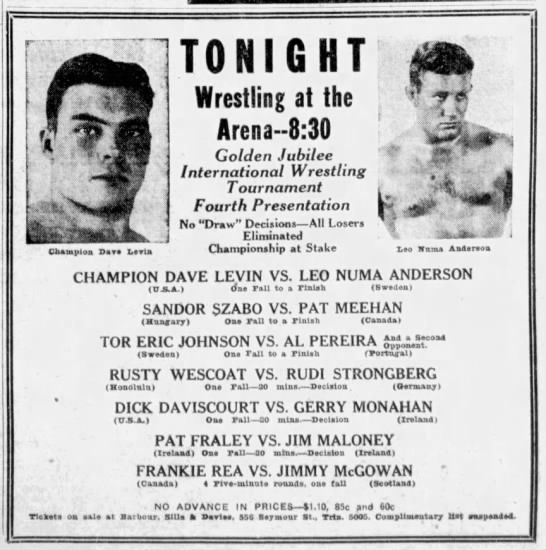
July 16, 1936 advertisement for Vancouver, British Columbia, Canada

The next night he would travel to Vancouver to defend his title again in Canada against Leo Anderson. He would win via pinfall in 21 minutes and 30 seconds. The Vancouver Province newspaper would describe Levin as the "Jewish he-man" with "Viking youth."

On July 20, Los Angeles promoter Lou Daro organized a 20-man tournament to take place on July 22 to crown a new number one contender for the World's Title held by Vincent Lopez. He invited Dave Levin to participate to prove he was a worthy champion and worthy of the unification match both he and Lopez sought. Levin declined and instead said he would defend his World Championship versus the tournament winner and then defeat Vincent Lopez after. Dave Levin contended that he travelled the United States along his way to California defending his championship while Lopez was a California appointed champion and rarely left his own state.

The San Francisco Examiner's beat writer Prescott Sullivan claimed on July 21 that he received a letter from a Max Bauman of Rochester, New York, which exposed Dave Levin's heritage. He claimed that Levin "is a person by the name of George Wenzel, far from being Jewish, he is a German of strong Nazi sympathies." Dave Levin ignored these comments and went on to wrestling that same evening in San Francisco, defeating Joe Savoldi once again.

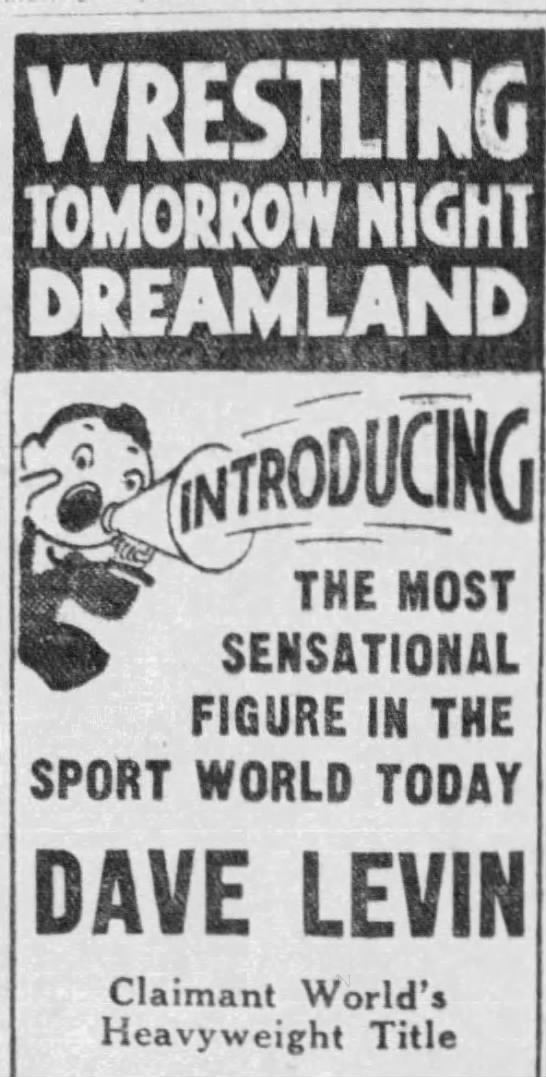
San Francisco advertisement for Dave Levin's debut in that city, July 1936

The next evening, Levin would travel north to Portland, Oregon, to defeat former World's Champion Gun Sonnenberg in two straight falls.

Disappointed with the constant back and forth in the state of California and their promoter Lou Daro, Levin decided to leave California to face challenges across the United States. He would defend his championship in Chicago, Milwaukee, Detroit and Toronto over the course of two weeks and finally on August 1, an agreement was reached with Los Angeles promoter Lou Daro for a unification match between Vincent Lopez and Dave Levin to take place in an "open air stadium" on August 19 but Daro had a condition that Dave Levin first defeat Chief Little Wolf in the main event of his August 5 Olympic Auditorium show. Levin would defeat Little Wolf with ease in front of 7,500 fans. The unification match was set the next day to take place at Wrigley Field on August 19 and was listed as for the "World's Undisputed Heavyweight Wrestling Championship".

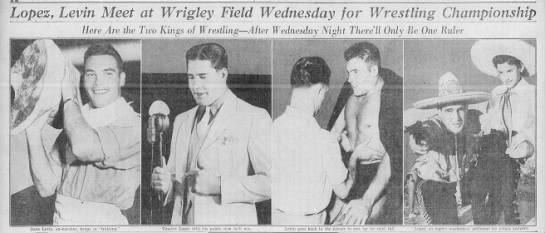
Los Angeles Times photo retrospective on August 16th prior to the title unification match

In front of 20,000 fans, Dave Levin would defeat Vincent Lopez to become the undisputed World's Heavyweight Wrestling Champion. Levin would lose the first fall in 15 minutes and 35 seconds but then come back to claim the second on a disqualification after 25 minutes and 53 seconds. Both men came out exhausted but it was Levin using forearm smashes to win the third fall in 6 minutes and 11 seconds. Lopez cried foul but the independent referee assigned from Salt Lake City claimed there was no controversy.

By this point Levin enjoyed being recognized in most of the continental United States and Canada as the undisputed World Heavyweight Champion but there was still one person who held a claim and that was Everett Marshall who held the National Wrestling Association World's Heavyweight Championship.

Levin would defend his championship several times across California before heading back east. On September 1 promoter Pay Fabiani announced a match will take place between Dave Levin and Dean Detton in Philadelphia, so long as Levin made it back without losing the championship along the way. Dave earned victories over Gus Sonnenberg, Sammy Stein, Vincent Lopez, Pat Fraley, Freddy Meyer, and future World Champion Sandor Szabo.

== Personal life ==
Dave Levin after winning the World's Heavyweight Championship in 1936 said that wrestling was not on his radar in life. He worked as a butcher prior to professional wrestling but his real dream was to be a fire fighter. He would claim that he "passed the physical examination but would flunk the mental exam."

Levin was also a cross-country runner while attending Bushwick High School prior to his butchering apprenticeship.

== Championships and accomplishments ==
- California State Athletic Commission
  - World Heavyweight Championship (Los Angeles version) (1 time)
  - California State Heavyweight Championship (1 time)
- Cauliflower Alley Club
  - Other honoree (1995)
- Gulf Athletic Club
  - Texas Heavyweight Championship (2 time)
- Jack Pfefer Promotions
  - World Heavyweight Championship (Jack Pfefer version) (5 times)
- Midwest Wrestling Association
  - MWA World Heavyweight Championship (1 time)
- New York State Athletic Commission
  - New York State Athletic Commission World Heavyweight Championship (1 time)
- Other titles
  - World Heavyweight Championship (1 time)
