= Cordovano =

Cordovano is a surname. Notable people with the surname include:

- Sam Cordovano (1906–1995), American football player
- Steven Cordovano, American role-playing game designer
