= World Heavyweight Championship (Los Angeles) =

Professional wrestling championship

World Heavyweight Championship (Los Angeles version)

Details
- Date established: 1930
- Date retired: May 21, 1952
Statistics
- First champion: Ed Don George
- Final champion: Lou Thesz
- Most reigns: Jim Londos (3 reigns)

The World Heavyweight Championship was a professional wrestling world heavyweight championship recognized in Los Angeles from 1930 until 1952, when it was unified with the NWA World Heavyweight Championship.

== Title history ==
Key

Symbol	Meaning
N.	The overall championship reign
Reign	The reign number for the specific wrestler listed.
Event	The event in which the championship changed hands

N.	Wrestler	Reign	Date	Days held	Location	Event	Notes	Ref.
1	Ed Don George	1	December 10, 1930	124	Los Angeles, California	House Show	Defeated Gus Sonnenberg to win the AWA Boston version of the World title; recognized in California.	[1]
2	Ed Lewis	1	April 13, 1931	322	Los Angeles, California	House Show		2
-	Vacated	-	February 28, 1932	-	-	-		
3	Jim Londos	1	March 2, 1932	407	Los Angeles, California	House Show	Has defeated Dick Shikat on 30/06/06 in Philadelphia, PA to be recognized as world champion by the state athletic commissions of New York and Pennsylvania; recognized as champion in Los Angeles, CA as late as 33/04/12.	
-	Vacated	-	April 12, 1933	-	-	-		
4	Jim Browning	1	May 1, 1933	421	Los Angeles, California	House Show	Has defeated Ed "Strangler" Lewis on 33/02/20 in New York, NY to be recognized as world champion by the state athletic commissions of New York and Pennsylvania; recognized as champion in Los Angeles, CA from 33/05.	
5	Jim Londos	2	June 25, 1934	311	New York City, New York	House Show	Suspended by the California Athletic Commission when Londos fails to appear for the scheduled title defense against Chief Little Wolf on 35/02/27; recognition officially withdrawn in Los Angeles in 35/05 for failure to enter an international tournament.	
-	Vacated	-	May 1, 1935	-	-	-		
6	Vincent Lopez	1	July 24, 1935	392	Los Angeles, California	House Show	Defeats Man Mountain Dean in the tournament final.	
7	Dave Levin	1	August 19, 1936	41	Los Angeles, California	House Show		
8	Dean Detton	1	September 28, 1936	262	Philadelphia, Pennsylvania	House Show		
9	Bronko Nagurski	1	June 16, 1937	520	Minneapolis, Minnesota	House Show		
10	Jim Londos	3	November 18, 1938	2628	Philadelphia, Pennsylvania	House Show		
-	Vacated	-	January 28, 1946	-	-	-		
11	Babe Sharkey	1	February 1, 1946	213	Los Angeles, California	House Show	Billed as champion on arrival. Previously held the Maryland version of the Title.	3
12	George Becker	1	September 1, 1946	336	Portland, Oregon	House show		[4]
13	Enrique Torres	1	December 11, 1946	106	Los Angeles, California	House Show		
14	Gorgeous George	1	March 26, 1947	699	Los Angeles, California	House Show		
15	Enrique Torres	2	February 22, 1949	638	Los Angeles, California	House Show		
16	Baron Michele Leone	1	November 22, 1950	546	Los Angeles, California	House show		
17	Lou Thesz	1	May 21, 1952	<1	Los Angeles, California	House show	Unified with NWA World Heavyweight Championship as a result of the match	
-	Deactivated	-	May 21, 1952	-	-	-		

== See also ==
- Pacific Northwest Wrestling
- List of early world heavyweight champions in professional wrestling
