= World Heavyweight Wrestling Championship (original version) =

First professional wrestling world heavyweight championship (1905)

- One of the title belts used to represent the original World Heavyweight Wrestling Championship in the early 20th century

Details
- Date established: May 4, 1905
- Date retired: July 24, 1957
Statistics
- First champion: George Hackenschmidt
- Final champion: Lou Thesz
- Most reigns: Ed Lewis (4 reigns)
- Longest reign: Jim Londos (2,628 days)
- Shortest reign: Stanislaus Zbyszko (45 days)
- Oldest champion: Stanislaus Zbyszko (46 years, 15 days)
- Youngest champion: Joe Stecher (22 years, 103 days)

The World Heavyweight Wrestling Championship was the first recognized professional wrestling world heavyweight championship created in 1905 to identify the best catch-as-catch-can wrestler in the world.

The subsequent legacy of the championship is not linear, with the champion being disputed among various promotions until the formation of the National Wrestling Alliance (NWA) in 1948. The last several reigns are recognized by the NWA under the NWA World Heavyweight Championship's lineage.

The first recognized World Heavyweight Wrestling Champion was George Hackenschmidt, who officially won the championship on May 4, 1905, by defeating Tom Jenkins in New York City. The championship remained active for the next 51 years, with the last recognized reign being disputed between Lou Thesz and Édouard Carpentier after a match between the two ended in a legitimate disqualification.

== History ==
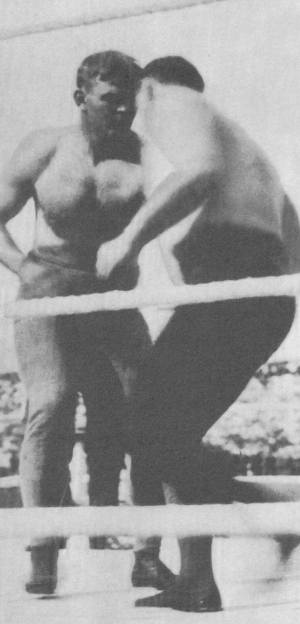
Frank Gotch and George Hackenschmidt were the first two champions

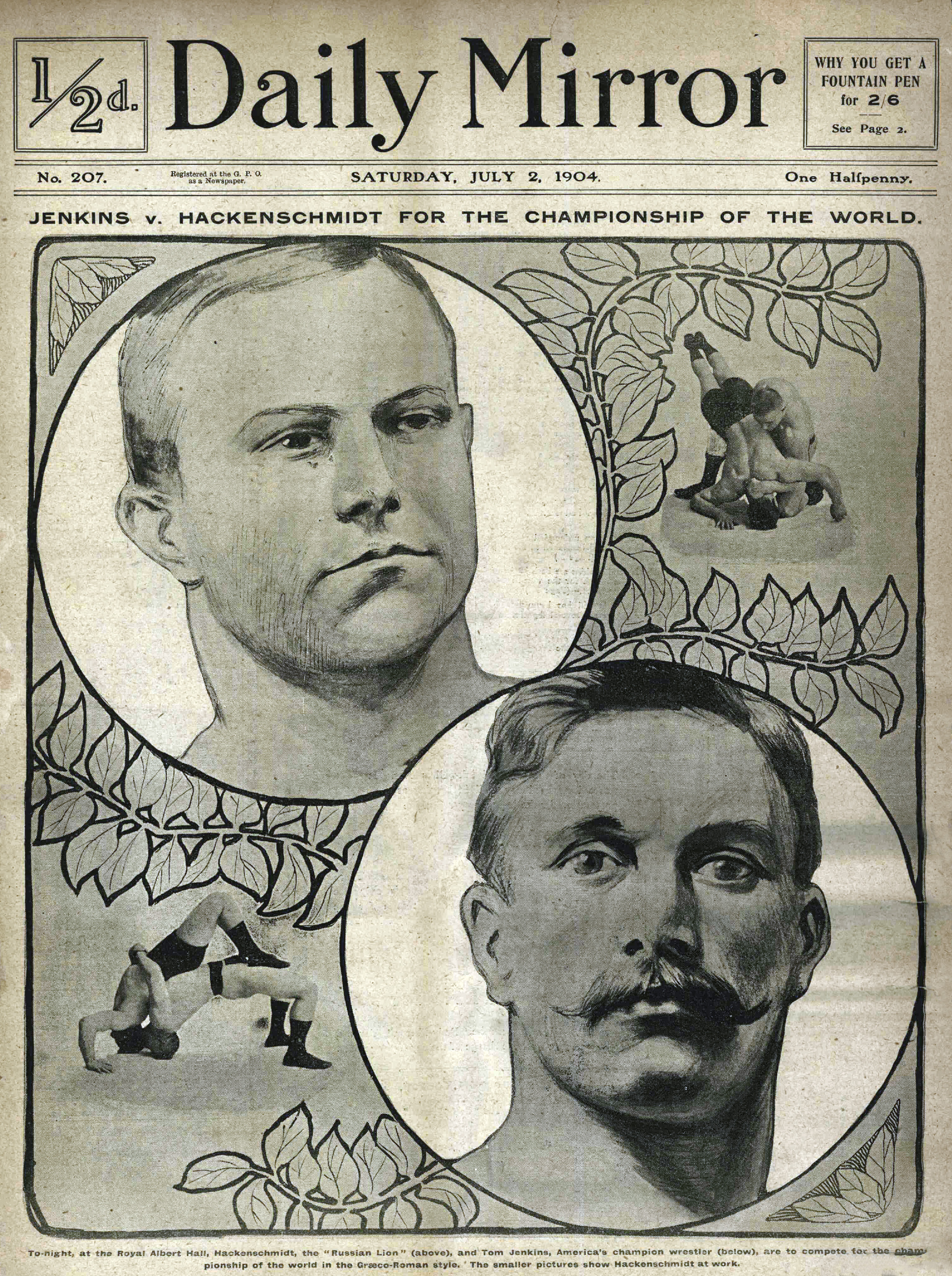
Hackenschmidt and Jenkins on the front page of the Daily Mirror, July 2, 1904

George Hackenschmidt won a world championship tournament to become the first champion. Hackenschmidt won several other tournaments in Paris, France; Hamburg, Germany; Saint Petersburg, Russia; Elberfeld, Germany; and Berlin, Germany in the same year. He also won the European Greco-Roman Heavyweight Championship title from Tom Cannon on September 4, 1902, in Liverpool, England. He won the recognition of being the World Heavyweight Wrestling Champion on January 30, 1904, in London, England by defeating Ahmed Madrali. Hackenschmidt defeated American Heavyweight Champion Tom Jenkins on May 4, 1905, in New York City to become the recognized world champion in North America.

Frank Gotch won the title from Hackenschmidt on April 3, 1908, and he held the title for five years until his retirement on April 1, 1913. He was the sixth longest reigning world heavyweight champion in history behind Bruno Sammartino, Jim Londos, Lou Thesz, Verne Gagne (who all held their world titles for over seven years) and Bob Backlund (who held his for nearly six years).

Joe Stecher defeated American Heavyweight Champion Charlie Cutler to become the first widely recognized world heavyweight champion after the retirement of Frank Gotch.

After Joe Stecher lost the title to Johan Olin by countout, Olin started his own line, with both iterations of the title being defended. Ed Lewis defeated Olin while Earl Caddock defeated Stecher. Lewis and Wladek Zbyszko traded the title on multiple occasions between 1917 and 1919, making Zbyszko a three-time unofficial champion and Lewis a two-time unofficial champion, while Caddock debatably held the title for a period of 23 days - 1,027 days, depending on which iteration of the title is deemed official. Joe Stecher was able to defeat both Wladek Zbyszko and Ed Lewis to unify both titles in 1920.

On April 15, 1925, Stanislaus Zbyszko defeated previous champion Wayne Munn to win the championship. However, Munn continued to be recognized as the World Heavyweight Champion in Michigan and in Illinois. Ed Lewis defeated Wayne Munn on February 2, 1928, in Michigan City, Indiana for the Michigan/Illinois World Heavyweight Wrestling Championship version. Joe Stetcher then defeated Zbyszko to become widely recognized champion. The dispute ended when Lewis defeated Stetcher on February 21, 1928.

Gus Sonnenburg won the title from Lewis on January 4, 1929, but the recognition of being the world champion by the wrestling section of the National Boxing Association was withdrawn from Sonnenberg for failing to meet real title contenders.

Lewis won the title again on April 13, 1931. Lewis was also AWA World Heavyweight Champion in Boston at the time, but lost that title by disqualification to Henri Deglane on May 4, 1931, in Montreal. However, Lewis was still recognized as the World Heavyweight Wrestling Champion in Illinois. Lewis then defeated Wladek Zbyszko (who was widely considered the World Heavyweight Wrestling Champion) on November 2, 1931, in Chicago, ending the dispute. Lewis then continued by winning the New York State Athletic Commission World Heavyweight Championship by defeating Jack Sherry on October 10, 1932, for the vacant title. but lost it to Jim Browning.

Danno O'Mahony won the title from Lewis on July 30, 1935. O'Mahony defeated Londos to win the New York State Athletic Commission world title. O'Mahony also won the AWA world title by defeating Ed Don George on July 30, 1935, in Boston, Massachusetts to become the undisputed World Heavyweight Wrestling Champion. On March 2, 1936, Dick Shikat beat O'Mahony in New York, but the AWA continued to recognize O'Mahony as champion, splintering the "undisputed" nature of the title once again.

Ali Baba won the title on April 24, 1936. Four days later it was announced by The New York Times that Baba would not be recognized as the World Heavyweight Wrestling Champion in New York State by the New York Athletic Commission. However, it was announced that Baba and Shikat would face each other on May 5, 1936, at Madison Square Garden for the world title. Baba went on to win the bout and thus be recognized as the World Heavyweight Wrestling Champion.

Bronko Nagurski won the title on June 29, 1937. Nagurski was recognized as the undisputed World Heavyweight Wrestling Champion by The Ring magazine.

Londos won the title again on November 18, 1938, and retired as the World Heavyweight Wrestling Champion on January 28, 1946. Londos wrestled his last match on this date by defeating Lord Albert Mills.

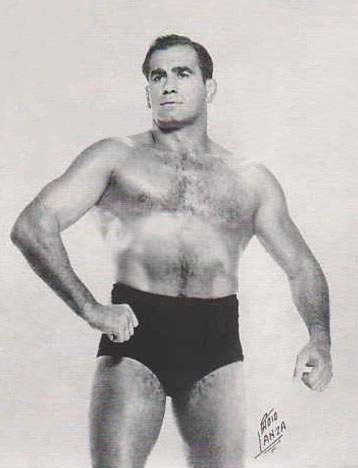
Lou Thesz was the final champion

Lou Thesz won the title on May 21, 1952. Thesz unified three championships to become the undisputed world heavyweight champion in wrestling: the National Wrestling Association World Heavyweight Championship (which he won on July 20, 1948, by defeating Bill Longson), the National Wrestling Alliance World Championship (which was awarded to him on November 27, 1949) and the Los Angeles Olympic Auditorium World Heavyweight Championship, which he won on May 21, 1952, by defeating Baron Michele Leone).

Whipper Billy Watson won the title on March 15, 1956, by defeating Thesz by countout.

Thesz won the title back from Watson on November 9, 1956. Édouard Carpentier defeated Lou Thesz by disqualification on June 14, 1957, in Chicago, Illinois once Thesz could not continue the match due to a back injury. The NWA rules stated that a title could not change on a disqualification and Carpentier awarded the NWA world title back to Thesz. Carpentier was still recognized as the World Heavyweight Champion in Omaha, Nebraska and in Boston, Massachusetts. He was then later recognized as the World Heavyweight Champion by Worldwide Wrestling Associates in Los Angeles, California. This ended the last time the World Heavyweight Wrestling Championship was unified and to date has never been fully unified again. The Omaha version of the World Heavyweight Championship was later unified with the AWA World Heavyweight Championship. Thesz defeated Carpentier in a rematch by disqualification on July 24, 1957, in Montreal, Quebec, Canada for the title.

The title was unofficially retired on July 24, 1957, and its lineage continued over to the National Wrestling Alliance World Heavyweight Championship.

== Reigns ==
There were a total of 28 reigns and 3 vacancies. The first recognized World Heavyweight Wrestling Champion was George Hackenschmidt, who officially won the championship on May 4, 1905, by defeating Tom Jenkins in New York City, New York, the championship remained active for the next 51 years with the last recognized reign beginning on November 9, 1956.

Ed Lewis holds the record for most reigns as the World Heavyweight Wrestling Champion with four. Lewis also holds the record for most combined days as champion with 3,073 days, while Jim Londos holds the record for longest reign at 2,628 days. Stanislaus Zbyszko holds the record for shortest reign at 45 days and is also the oldest champion, winning at the age of 46 years, 15 days, while Joe Stecher is the youngest champion, winning at the age of 22 years, 103 days.

The final reign was disputed between Lou Thesz and Edouard Carpentier. All matches were held at house shows.

Key
No.	Overall reign number
Reign	Reign number for the specific champion
Days	Number of days held

No.	Champion	Championship change			Reign statistics		Notes	Ref.
No.	Champion	Date	Event	Location	Reign	Days	Notes	Ref.
1	George Hackenschmidt	May 4, 1905	House show	New York, New York	1	1,065	Hackenschmidt won a world championship tournament to become the first champion, as well as several other tournaments in Paris, Saint Petersburg, Hamburg, Elberfeld, Germany and Berlin in the same year. He also won the European Greco-Roman Heavyweight Championship title from Tom Cannon on September 4, 1902, in Liverpool, England. He won the recognition of being the World Heavyweight Champion on January 30, 1904, in London by defeating Ahmed Madrali, retroactively recognized by the National Wrestling Alliance as the real World champion. Hackenschmidt defeated American Heavyweight Champion, Tom Jenkins, on May 4, 1905, in New York City to become the recognized World Heavyweight Champion in North America.	
2	Frank Gotch	April 3, 1908	House show	Chicago, Illinois	1	1,824	Retroactively recognized by the National Wrestling Alliance as the real World champion. Gotch held the title for five years until April 1, 1913. He was the sixth longest reigning world heavyweight champion in history behind Bruno Sammartino, Jim Londos, Lou Thesz, Verne Gagne (who all held their world titles for over seven years) and Bob Backlund (who held his for nearly six years).	
—	Vacated	April 1, 1913	House show	Kansas City, Missouri	—	—	Vacated due to Gotch's retirement.	
3	Americus	March 13, 1914	House show	Kansas City, Missouri	1	55	Upon his retirement and vacancy, Frank Gotch recommended Gus Schoenlein/Americus and Fred Beell compete for the vacant title. Schonelein won.	
4	Stanislaus Zbyszko	May 7, 1914	House show	Kansas City, Missouri	1	147-176		
—	Vacated	October 1914	—	—	—	—	Vacated the title to enlist in the Austro-Hungarian Army in October 1914	
5	Charlie Cutler	January 8, 1915	House show	N/A	1	178	After defeating American Heavyweight Champion Dr. Benjamin Roller, Cutler claimed the title. He was recognised in Omaha, Des Moines, Chicago and New York.	
6	Joe Stecher	July 5, 1915	House show	Omaha, Nebraska	1	644	Stecher defeated Charlie Cutler to become the first widely recognized World Heavyweight Champion after the retirement of Frank Gotch. Retroactively recognized by the National Wrestling Alliance as the real World champion.	
†	Johan Olin	December 11, 1916	House show	Springfield, Massachusetts	1	142	Defeated Stecher by count-out, was awarded championship by referee.	
7	Earl Caddock	April 9, 1917	House show	Omaha, Nebraska	1	1,026	Defeated Stecher for the title in spite of John Olin already claiming ownership. Retroactively recognized by the National Wrestling Alliance as the real World champion.	
†	Ed Lewis	May 2, 1917	House show	Chicago, Illinois	1	34	Defeated Olin for the title in spite of Caddock's claim to Stecher's line.	
†	Wladek Zbyszko	June 5, 1917	House show	San Francisco, California	1	29	Defeated Ed Lewis for title.	
†	Ed Lewis	July 4, 1917	House show	Chicago, Illinois	2	625	Won title from Zbyszko.	
†	Wladek Zbyszko	December 22, 1917	House show	New York, New York	2	148	Zybszko defeats Lewis for the title, but Lewis continues to claim the title. Caddock defeats Zbyszko on February 8, 1918, in Des Moines, Iowa to unify Zybyszko's part of the Olin line, but Zybyszko still claims ownership. Lewis defeats Zybszko on May 19, 1918, in New York, New York to make him the undisputed champion of the Johan Olin line, but not the Joe Stecher line. Champion of the Stecher line, Earl Caddock defeats Lewis on June 21, 1918, in Des Moines, Iowa, but Lewis still claims the title.	
†	Wladek Zbyszko	March 21, 1919	House show	New York, New York	3	59	Defeated Lewis for the title.	
†	Joe Stecher	May 19, 1919	House show	Louisville, Kentucky	2	256	Won title from Zbyszko.	
8	Joe Stecher	January 30, 1920	House show	New York, New York	2	318	Defeated Earl Caddock to unify both the Olin and the Stecher lines. The lineage of the Stecher line was carried forward, so Stecher's title win is recognised as starting on January 30, 1920, as opposed to May 19, 1919. Retroactively recognized by the National Wrestling Alliance as the real World champion.	
9	Ed Lewis	December 13, 1920	House show	New York, New York	1	144	Retroactively recognized by the National Wrestling Alliance as the real World champion.	
10	Stanislaus Zbyszko	May 6, 1921	House show	New York, New York	2	301	Retroactively recognized by the National Wrestling Alliance as the real World champion.	
11	Ed Lewis	March 3, 1922	House show	Wichita, Kansas	2	1,042	Retroactively recognized by the National Wrestling Alliance as the real World champion.	
12	Wayne Munn	January 8, 1925	House show	Wichita, Kansas	1	97	Retroactively recognized by the National Wrestling Alliance as the real World champion.	
13	Stanislaus Zbyszko	April 15, 1925	House show	Philadelphia, Pennsylvania	3	45	Retroactively recognized by the National Wrestling Alliance as the real World champion. Though Zbyszko defeated Munn to win the championship, Munn continued to be recognized as World Heavyweight Champion in Michigan and in Illinois.	
14	Joe Stecher	May 30, 1925	House show	St. Louis, Missouri	3	997	Retroactively recognized by the National Wrestling Alliance as the real World champion.	
15	Ed Lewis	February 21, 1928	House show	St. Louis, Missouri	3	318	Retroactively recognized by the National Wrestling Alliance as the real World champion. Lewis defeated Wayne Munn on February 2, 1928, in Michigan City, Indiana for the Michigan/Illinois World Heavyweight Championship version. Lewis defeated Stecher on February 21, 1928, to end the dispute.	
16	Gus Sonnenberg	January 4, 1929	House show	Boston, Massachusetts	1	705	Retroactively recognized by the National Wrestling Alliance as the real World champion. The recognition of being the World Heavyweight Champion was withdrawn from Gus Sonnenberg by the wrestling section of the National Boxing Association in 1929 for failing to meet real title contenders.	
17	Ed Don George	December 10, 1930	House show	Los Angeles, California	1	124	Retroactively recognized by the National Wrestling Alliance as the real World champion after Dick Shikat and Jim Londos.	
18	Ed Lewis	April 13, 1931	House show	Los Angeles, California	4	1,569	Retroactively recognized by the National Wrestling Alliance as the real World champion. Lewis lost the AWA World Heavyweight Championship by disqualification to Henri Deglane on May 4, 1931, in Montreal, Quebec, Canada. Henri Deglane retroactively recognized by the National Wrestling Alliance as the real World champion. After Deglane, Ed Lewis still recognized as real World Heavyweight Champion by the NWA. Lewis also defeated the title claimer, Wladek Zbyszko, on November 2, 1931, in Chicago, Illinois for the title. Lewis continued to win the New York State Athletic Commission World Heavyweight Championship by defeating Jack Sherry on October 10, 1932.	
19	Danno O'Mahoney	July 30, 1935	House show	Boston, Massachusetts	1	216	Retroactively recognized by the National Wrestling Alliance as the real World champion after Ed Don George, Jim Browning and Jim Londos. O'Mahoney defeated Jim Londos to win the New York State Athletic Commission World Heavyweight Championship. Mahoney continues to win the AWA World Heavyweight Championship (Boston version) by defeating Ed Don George (who had beat Deglane on February 9, 1933) on July 30, 1935, in Boston, Massachusetts to become the undisputed World Heavyweight Champion.	
20	Dick Shikat	March 2, 1936	House show	New York, New York	1	54	Retroactively recognized by the National Wrestling Alliance as the real World champion.	
21	Ali Baba	April 25, 1936	House show	Detroit, Michigan	1	48	Retroactively recognized by the National Wrestling Alliance as the real World champion. On April 29, 1936, it was announced by the New York Times that Ali Baba would not be recognized as World Heavyweight Champion in the New York State by The New York Athletic Commission; however, it was announced that Ali Baba and Dick Shikat would face each other on May 5, 1936, at Madison Square Garden for the World Heavyweight Championship. Baba went on to win the professional wrestling bout and thus be recognized as the World Heavyweight Champion.	
22	Dave Levin	June 12, 1936	House show	Newark, New Jersey	1	109	Wins by disqualification. Recognized by The Ring magazine as the true world champion. Baba continues to claim the title but loses to Everett Marshall on June 26, 1936, in Columbus, OH. Levin also wins Los Angeles version, defeating Vincent Lopez on August 19, 1936, in Los Angeles, CA. Everett Marshall retroactively recognized by the National Wrestling Alliance as the real World champion after Ali Baba.	
23	Dean Detton	September 29, 1936	House show	Philadelphia, Pennsylvania	1	273	Recognized by The Ring magazine as the true world champion. Has also defeated Ed Strangler Lewis in a title tournament final earlier in the year in Philadelphia, PA.	
24	Bronko Nagurski	June 29, 1937	House show	Minneapolis, Minnesota	1	507	Nagurski was recognized as the undisputed World Heavyweight Champion by The Ring magazine.	
25	Jim Londos	November 18, 1938	House show	Philadelphia, Pennsylvania	1	2,628	Londos retired as World Heavyweight Champion in 1946.	
—	Vacated	January 28, 1946	House show	Denver, Colorado	—	—	Londos wrestled his last match on this date, defeating Lord Albert Mills.	
26	Lou Thesz	May 21, 1952	House show	Los Angeles, California	1	1,394	Thesz unified three championships to become the undisputed world heavyweight champion, the National Wrestling Association World Heavyweight Championship which he won on July 20, 1948, by defeating Bill Longson, the National Wrestling Alliance World Heavyweight Championship which was awarded to him on November 27, 1949 and the Los Angeles Olympic Auditorium World Heavyweight Championship which he won on May 21, 1952, by defeating Baron Michele Leone.	
27	Whipper Billy Watson	March 15, 1956	House show	Toronto, Ontario, Canada	1	239	Watson defeated Lou Thesz by countout to win the world title.	
28	Lou Thesz	November 9, 1956	House show	St. Louis, Missouri	2	257	Édouard Carpentier defeated Lou Thesz by disqualification on June 14, 1957, in Chicago, Illinois when Thesz could not continue the match due to a back injury. The NWA rules stated that a title could not change on a disqualification, and Carpentier gave the title back to Thesz. Carpentier was then recognized as World Heavyweight Champion in Omaha, Nebraska and in Boston, Massachusetts. He was then later recognized as the World Heavyweight Champion by the World Wrestling Association in Los Angeles, California. This was the last time the World Heavyweight Championship has been unified and to date has never been fully unified again. The Omaha version of the World Heavyweight Championship was later unified with the AWA World Heavyweight Championship. Thesz defeated Carpentier in a rematch by disqualification on July 24, 1957, in Montreal, Quebec, Canada for the title.	
—	Deactivated	July 24, 1957	House show	Montreal, Quebec	—	—	Lineage continued over to the NWA World Heavyweight Championship.	

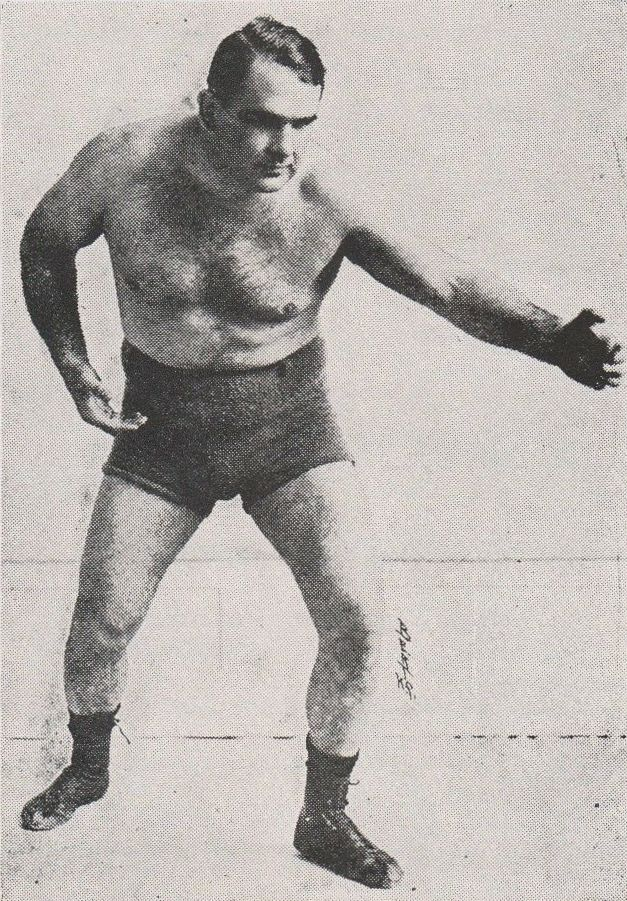
Ed Lewis had most reigns and the longest combined reign

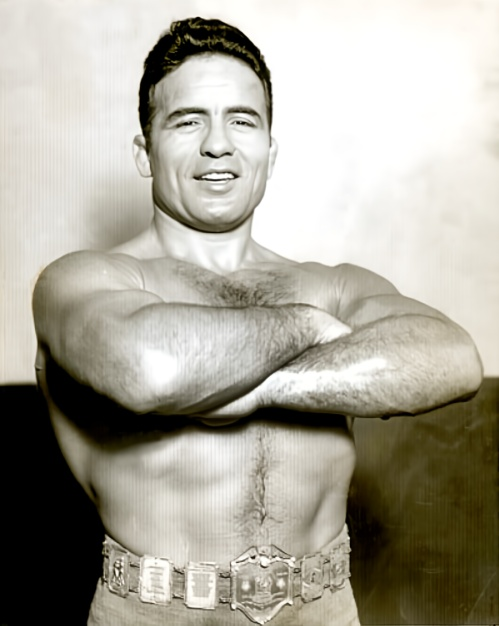
Jim Londos had the longest individual reign

== List of combined reigns (excluding unrecognised) ==
Rank	Wrestler	No. of reigns	Combined days
1	Ed Lewis	4	3,073
2	Jim Londos	1	2,628
4	Joe Stecher	3	1,959
4	Frank Gotch	1	1,824
5	Lou Thesz	2	1,651
6	George Hackenschmidt	1	1,065
7	Earl Caddock	1	1,026
8	Gus Sonnenberg	1	705
9	Bronko Nagurski	1	507
10	Stanislaus Zbyszko	3	493
11	Dean Detton	1	273
12	Whipper Billy Watson	1	239
13	Danno O'Mahoney	1	216
14	Charlie Cutler	1	178
15	Ed Don George	1	124
16	Dave Levin	1	109
17	Wayne Munn	1	97
18	Americus	1	55
19	Dick Shikat	1	54
20	Ali Baba	1	48

== List of combined reigns (including unrecognised) ==
Rank	Wrestler	No. of reigns	Combined days
1	Ed Lewis	6	3,682
2	Jim Londos	1	2,628
3	Joe Stecher	4	2,118
4	Frank Gotch	1	1,824
5	Lou Thesz	2	1,651
6	George Hackenschmidt	1	1,065
7	Earl Caddock	1	1,026
8	Gus Sonnenberg	1	705
9	Bronko Nagurski	1	507
10	Stanislaus Zbyszko	3	493
11	Dean Detton	1	273
12	Whipper Billy Watson	1	239
13	Wladek Zbyszko	3	236
14	Danno O'Mahoney	1	216
15	Charlie Cutler	1	178
16	John Olin	1	142
17	Ed Don George	1	124
18	Dave Levin	1	109
19	Wayne Munn	1	97
20	Americus	1	55
21	Dick Shikat	1	54
22	Ali Baba	1	48

== Belt designs ==
The standard Championship belt has three plates on a black leather strap.

== Legacy ==
A diagram showing the evolution of various world heavyweight championships.

Various promotions have been home to world heavyweight championships with origins that can also be traced back to the World Heavyweight Wrestling Championship.

=== NWA Worlds Heavyweight Championship ===
The National Wrestling Alliance Worlds Heavyweight Championship assumed the original world championship's position as the preeminent wrestling championship, and claimed its lineage. Most of the following championships, all based in North America, arose out of the NWA championship. "World" heavyweight championships in Japan, Mexico, and the US Independent circuit were created ex novo after promotions started.

=== AWA World Heavyweight Championship ===
The AWA World Heavyweight Championship was established in May 1960, after the NWA's Minnesota member territory withdrew from the NWA and established the American Wrestling Association. The first champion was Pat O'Connor, who was recognized upon the AWA's secession from the NWA as O'Connor held the NWA World Heavyweight Championship as well, which he won on January 9, 1959. The creation of the AWA World Heavyweight Championship along with the NWA World Heavyweight Championship would pave the way for the creation of many other world championships in other wrestling promotions. The American Wrestling Association and the title became inactive in 1990 and the organization officially closed down in 1991 with the title also being decommissioned.

=== WWE Championship ===
The WWE Championship's origin can be traced back to the NWA World Heavyweight Championship after an incident in which the Capitol Wrestling Corporation at the time left the NWA to become the World Wide Wrestling Federation (WWWF). This was after the WWWF refused to recognize Lou Thesz as the NWA World Heavyweight Champion after he beat Buddy Rogers in a one fall match – the NWA World Heavyweight Championship title matches usually followed a best-of-three fall format – Vincent J. McMahon, the WWWF's owner created the WWWF World Heavyweight Championship and awarded Rogers the championship belt proclaiming he won it in a (apocryphal) tournament in Brazil in April 1963. He lost the championship to Bruno Sammartino a month later on May 17, 1963, after suffering a heart attack shortly before the match. To accommodate Rogers' condition, the match was booked to last under a minute. Sammartino would retain the title for seven years, eight months and one day (2,803 days), until losing it to Ivan Koloff, making Sammartino's reign the longest continuous world championship reign in men's wrestling history.

=== WCW World Heavyweight Championship ===
The WCW World Heavyweight Championship's origin is traced back to a match which took place on January 11, 1991, where Ric Flair defeated Sting for the NWA World Heavyweight Championship. When WCW pulled out of the NWA in early 1991, Flair was recognized as the first WCW World Heavyweight Champion. The WCW International World Heavyweight Championship can be traced back to an incident in WCW's final split with the NWA in 1993, when Flair's NWA World Heavyweight Championship reign continued to be recognized as the WCW International World Heavyweight Championship. The two titles were unified in June 1994. The title was briefly defended in WWF following WWF's purchase of WCW in 2001 before being unified into the WWF Championship and retired. Chris Jericho unified the WCW World Heavyweight Championship with the WWF Championship at WWF Vengeance 2001.

=== Total Nonstop Action Wrestling ===
TNA formed in May 2002 and established a partnership with the NWA, allowing TNA control of the NWA World Heavyweight Championship and NWA World Tag Team Championship. On June 19, 2002, TNA crowned the first NWA World Heavyweight Champion under their banner after Ken Shamrock won a Gauntlet for the Gold match at TNA's first weekly pay-per-view. On May 13, 2007, the NWA severed ties with TNA after the then-current NWA World Heavyweight Champion, Christian Cage, refused to defend the NWA World Heavyweight Championship against wrestlers from other NWA territories. A brand new TNA World Heavyweight Championship was first won by Kurt Angle who won it at the 2007 edition of Sacrifice by defeating Cage and Sting. This title however neither claimed lineage to nor was linked to the Original World Heavyweight Championship.

=== WWE's World Heavyweight Championship ===
WWE created a new World Heavyweight Championship following its first brand split, when then-WWE "Undisputed" Champion Brock Lesnar became exclusive to the SmackDown brand, refusing to face designated number one contender Triple H, who was a member of the Raw brand. Triple H was awarded the newly established title. This championship was a successor to the WCW World Heavyweight Championship, split via the WWE Championship. It was represented by the same Big Gold Belt once used for the WCW and NWA championships, and was awarded by Raw General Manager Eric Bischoff, the former President of WCW. WWE asserts its legacy extends back to the title created in 1905. Like the original World Heavyweight Wrestling Championship, the title was not prefixed with the name of a promotion, though the physical belt had the WWE logo on it. It would be reunified with the WWE Championship by Randy Orton on December 15, 2013.

In May, 27, 2023 at Night of Champions event. Seth Rollins was crowned as the winner of a new World Heavyweight Championship defeating AJ Styles in a tournament to become the inaugural champion, on August 2, 2025, in the main event of Night 1 of SummerSlam, CM Punk defeated Gunther to win the World Heavyweight Championship. In the process, Punk became the first wrestler to win the 2002 and the 2023 versions of the World Heavyweight Championship, the WWE made allusions to other titles including those of WCW, the NWA and the original World Heavyweight Championship, amalgamating the history of the championships. As affirmed by WWE, the World Heavyweight Championship is not a continuation of the NWA World Heavyweight, WCW World Heavyweight or the original World Heavyweight Championship, but rather its successor. Due to its relation to the three titles, its lineage is connected with the earliest recognized world heavyweight championship.

== See also ==
- American Heavyweight Championship
- Atlantic Athletic Commission World Heavyweight Championship
- Early wrestling championships
- MWA World Heavyweight Championship (Kansas City version)
- MWA World Heavyweight Championship (Ohio version)
- Women's World Championship

Sporting positions
Preceded by First	First world wrestling championship 1905–1957	Succeeded by NWA World Heavyweight Championship
