= Hans Furst =

Austrian professional wrestler and matchmaker

Personal information
- Born: October 29, 1890 Vienna, Austria
- Died: November 2, 1967 (aged 77)

Professional wrestling career

Hans Furst (October 29, 1890 - November 2, 1967), also spelled Hans Fuerst, was an Austrian professional wrestler and matchmaker.

== Early life ==
Furst was born in Vienna, Austria on October 29, 1890. Furst was said to have won the Austrian wrestling championship at the age of 16 and was said to be the youngest wrestler to hold that title. He attended business college in Vienna, and learned to wrestle there. He finished second in a European lightweight title tournament while still being a student and was a member of his schools, wrestling, football and hockey teams. Furst was said to be a good swimmer and was said to be Austrian two-mile running champion.

== Wrestling career ==
First arrived in Buffalo, New York in 1907 and was the New York State Light-heavyweight champion in 1914 and 1915. Furst was said be "one of the cleverest light-heavyweight wrestlers" and had wrestled Wladek Zbyszko in 1911 at Brown's Gymnasium and also had fought George Hackenschmidt, Stanislaus Zbyszko and Dr. Benjamin Roller. He wrestled multiple matches against Oluf Nielsen and highly publicized losses to Pierre la Colosse and Cyclone Burns in 1915. Furst wrestled Earl Caddock and Ed "Strangler" Lewis in 1916 along with others like Joe Matty, Steve Karger and Adolph Pohl (who was known for his short temper). Furst defeated Cyclone Ress in February 1918 and was defeated by Wladek Zbyszko on June 22, 1918.

== Matchmaker ==
Furst partnered with Ed Delivuk to create of the Great Lakes Athletic Club in New York in the 1920s. Furst was an assistant matchmaker and treasurer of the Buffalo Sporting Club and later became the head matchmaker and secretary in 1934. Furst later resigned and sold his stake in the Buffalo Sports Club in August 1936.

== Personal life ==
Furst's main job outside of the ring was importing diamonds and Furst was said to enjoy swimming.
