= Adams, Pennsylvania (disambiguation) =

Adams, Pennsylvania may refer to:

- Adams, Armstrong County, Pennsylvania
- Adams County, Pennsylvania

== Adams Township ==
- Adams Township, Butler County, Pennsylvania
- Adams Township, Cambria County, Pennsylvania
- Adams Township, Snyder County, Pennsylvania
