= World Heavyweight Championship (National Wrestling Association) =

Professional wrestling world heavyweight championship

Details
- Promotion: National Wrestling Association

The World Heavyweight Championship was a professional wrestling world heavyweight championship of the National Wrestling Association (NWA), an offshoot of the National Boxing Association (NBA).

The title existed from 1929 through 1949, when it was unified with the National Wrestling Alliance's World Heavyweight Championship.

== Title history ==
Key
No.	Overall reign number
Reign	Reign number for the specific champion
Days	Number of days held

No.	Champion	Championship change			Reign statistics		Notes	Ref.
No.	Champion	Date	Event	Location	Reign	Days	Notes	Ref.
1	Dick Shikat	August 23, 1929	N/A	Philadelphia, Pennsylvania	1	287	Defeats Jim Londos to be recognized by the athletic commissions of New York and Pennsylvania and the National Boxing Association, all three of which have stripped Gus Sonnenberg of recognition as World champion in July 1929 for "failing to meet real contenders". Sonnenberg continues to be recognized by AWA in Boston. Retroactively recognized by the National Wrestling Alliance as the real World champion.	
2	Jim Londos	June 6, 1930	N/A	Philadelphia, Pennsylvania	1	1,847	Defeats Shikat and is initially recognized by the National Boxing Association. At the annual convention in September 1930, NBA agrees to create National Wrestling Association but does not recognize any world champion despite the previous decision made by NBA. On September 30, 1931, Jim Londos is recognized by the members as the first official champion by the National Wrestling Association. Also won the NYSAC World Title on June 25, 1934, defeating Jim Browning and unified both titles, to become recognized as the Undisputed World champion. Retroactively recognized by the National Wrestling Alliance as the real World champion.	
3	Danno O'Mahony	June 27, 1935	N/A	Boston, Massachusetts	1	431	Defeats Ed Don George on July 30, 1935 and unifies Boston AWA World Title and becomes the "Unified World Champion".	
—	Vacated	N/A	—	—	—	—	NWA/NBA title is declared vacant in September 1936.	
4	Dean Detton	October 8, 1936	N/A	St. Louis, MO	1	339	Has defeated a title claimant Dave Levin on 28/09/1936 in Philadelphia. Awarded the recognition as the first NWA champion since Danno O’Mahoney this day. Recognition later withdrawn.	
5	John Pesek	September 12, 1937	N/A	White Sulphur Springs, Virginia	1	338	Title awarded at the NWA/NBA annual meeting.	
—	Vacated	N/A	—	—	—	—	Stripped on August 16, 1938, for failure to defend against worthy opponents.	
6	Everett Marshall	September 14, 1938	N/A	Montréal, Quebec	1	101	Title awarded at the NWA/NBA annual meeting, when MWA/AWA World Champion Steve Casey left the country in September 1938. Retroactively recognized by the National Wrestling Alliance as the real World champion after Steve Casey.	
7	Lou Thesz	February 23, 1939	N/A	St. Louis, Missouri	1	120	Recognized by the National Wrestling Alliance as the real World champion.	
8	Bronko Nagurski	June 23, 1939	N/A	Houston, Texas	1	258	Recognized by the National Wrestling Alliance as the real World champion.	
9	Ray Steele	March 7, 1940	N/A	St. Louis, Missouri	1	369	Recognized by the National Wrestling Alliance as the real World champion.	
10	Bronko Nagurski	March 11, 1941	N/A	Houston, Texas	2	86	Recognized by the National Wrestling Alliance as the real World champion.	
11	Sándor Szabó	June 5, 1941	N/A	St. Louis, Missouri	1	259	Recognized by the National Wrestling Alliance as the real World champion.	
12	Bill Longson	February 19, 1942	N/A	St. Louis, Missouri	1	230	Recognized by the National Wrestling Alliance as the real World champion.	
13	Yvon Robert	October 7, 1942	N/A	Montreal, Quebec	1	20	Recognized by the National Wrestling Alliance as the real World champion.	
14	Bobby Managoff	November 27, 1942	N/A	Houston, Texas	1	115	Recognized by the National Wrestling Alliance as the real World Champion.	
15	Bill Longson	February 19, 1943	N/A	St. Louis, Missouri	2	1,463	Recognized by the National Wrestling Alliance as the real World champion.	
16	Whipper Billy Watson	February 21, 1947	N/A	St. Louis, Missouri	1	63	Recognized by the National Wrestling Alliance as the real World champion. The first time a world heavyweight wrestling championship changed hands on tv.	
17	Lou Thesz	April 25, 1947	N/A	St. Louis, Missouri	2	210	Recognized by the National Wrestling Alliance as the real World champion.	
18	Bill Longson	November 21, 1947	N/A	Houston, Texas	3	232	Recognized by the National Wrestling Alliance as the real World champion.	
19	Lou Thesz	July 20, 1948	N/A	Indianapolis, IN	3	505	Recognized by the National Wrestling Alliance as the real World champion.	
—	Deactivated	November 27, 1949	—	—	—	—	Title unified with the National Wrestling Alliance's World Heavyweight Championship, which is forfeited to Thesz by previous champion Orville Brown when he cannot defend due to career-ending injuries from an automobile accident on November 1.	
