= New York State Athletic Commission World Heavyweight Championship =

Professional wrestling championship

Details
- Promotion: New York State Athletic Commission
Statistics
- First champion: Jim Londos
- Final champion: Jim Londos
- Most reigns: Jim Londos (3 reigns)

The NYSAC World Heavyweight Championship was a professional wrestling world heavyweight championship owned and promoted by the New York State Athletic Commission. The title existed from 1929 through 1934.

== Title history ==
Key
| No. | Overall reign number |
| Reign | Reign number for the specific champion |
| Days | Number of days held |

| No. | Champion | Championship change | | | Reign statistics | | Notes | Ref. |
| No. | Champion | Date | Event | Location | Reign | Days | Notes | Ref. |
|---|---|---|---|---|---|---|---|---|
| 1 | Dick Shikat | August 23, 1929 | live event | Philadelphia, Pennsylvania | 1 | 287 | Defeated Jim Londos in the tournament final, after that Athletic Commissions in New York and Pennsylvania and the National Boxing Association, they had stripped Gus Sonnenberg of the World Title, for failing to meet "real" contenders, in July 1929. Retroactively recognized by the National Wrestling Alliance as the real World champion. | |
| 2 | Jim Londos | June 6, 1930 | live event | Philadelphia, Pennsylvania | 1 | 847 | Retroactively recognized by the National Wrestling Alliance as the real World champion. | |
| — | Vacated | September 30, 1932 | — | — | — | — | Stripped of the title for refusing to defend against the winner of Ed "Strangler" Lewis vs. Dick Shikat | |
| 3 | Ed Lewis | October 10, 1932 | live event | New York City, New York | 1 | 133 | Defeated Jack Sherry to win the vacant title. Retroactively recognized by the National Wrestling Alliance as the real World champion after Ed Don George. | |
| 4 | Jim Browning | February 20, 1933 | live event | New York City, New York | 1 | 490 | Retroactively recognized by the National Wrestling Alliance as the real World champion after Ed Don George. | |
| 5 | Jim Londos | June 25, 1934 | live event | New York City, New York | 2 | 367 | Also won the National Wrestling Association's World Heavyweight Championship in June, 1930 and unified both titles. Retroactively recognized by the NWA as the real World champion. | |
| 6 | Danno O'Mahoney | June 27, 1935 | live event | Boston, Massachusetts | 1 | 249 | Unified title with the Boston version of the AWA World Heavyweight Championship. Retroactively recognized by the National Wrestling Alliance as the real World champion. | |
| 7 | Dick Shikat | March 2, 1936 | live event | New York City, New York | 2 | 53 | Does not win the AWA World Heavyweight Championship. Retroactively recognized by the National Wrestling Alliance as the real World champion. | |
| 8 | Ali Baba | April 24, 1936 | live event | Detroit, Michigan | 1 | 49 | Retroactively recognized by the National Wrestling Alliance as the real World champion. | |
| 9 | Dave Levin | June 12, 1936 | live event | Newark, New Jersey | 1 | 108 | Won by disqualification; recognized by The Ring magazine as the "true world champion". Ali Baba continues to claim the title but loses to Everett Marshall on June 26, 1936 in Columbus, Ohio, retroactive Alliance recognition switched to MWA World Heavyweight Championship. Levin also wins Los Angeles version, defeating Vincent Lopez on August 19, 1936 in Los Angeles. | |
| 10 | Dean Detton | September 28, 1936 | live event | Philadelphia, Pennsylvania | 1 | 274 | Recognized by The Ring magazine as the "true world champion". Detton also defeated Ed "Strangler" Lewis in a title tournament final earlier in the year in Philadelphia | |
| 11 | Bronko Nagurski | June 29, 1937 | live event | Minneapolis, Minnesota | 1 | 507 | Recognized by The Ring magazine as the "true world champion". | |
| 12 | Jim Londos | November 18, 1938 | live event | Philadelphia, Pennsylvania | 3 | 2,601 | Recognized by The Ring magazine as the "true world champion" until Londos retired in 1946. | |
