= Dick Shikat =

German professional wrestler (1897–1968)

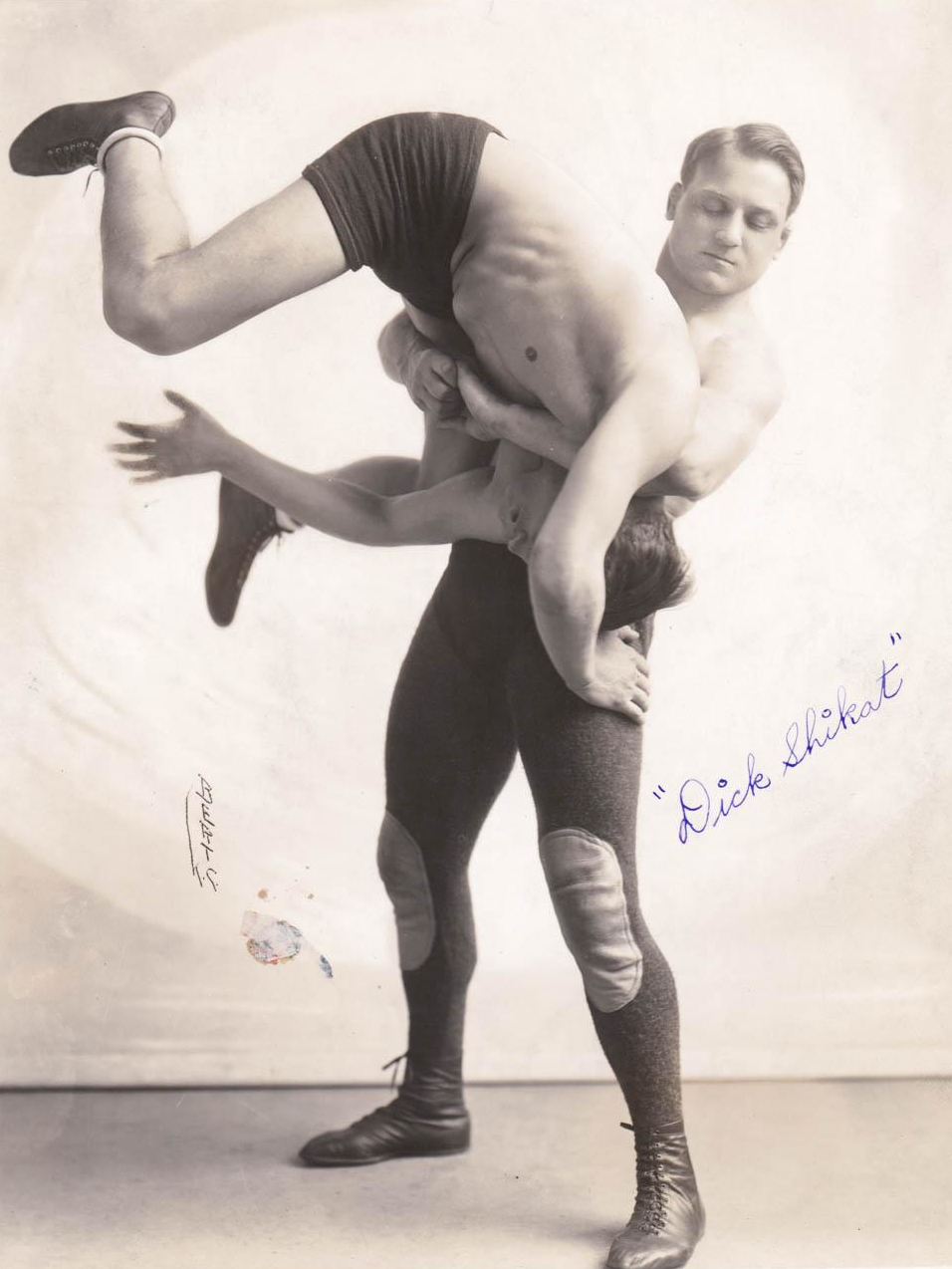
- A publicity photograph of Shikat (in long trunks) from the early 1930s

Personal information
- Born: Richard I. Schikat; 11 January 1897 Tilsit, East Prussia, Germany
- Died: 3 December 1968 (aged 71)
- Family: Paul Schikat (brother)

Professional wrestling career
- Ring name(s): Dick Shikat; Richard Shikat
- Billed height: 6 ft 1 in (185 cm)
- Billed weight: 220 lb (15 st 10 lb; 100 kg)
- Trained by: Joe Toots Mondt
- Debut: 1918
- Retired: 1953

Richard I. Shikat (11 January 1897 – 3 December 1968) was a German professional wrestler and World Heavyweight Champion who was active in the early portion of the twentieth century. Shikat was considered to be one of the most dangerous 'hookers' (catch wrestlers) of his era and had memorable bouts with Ed "Strangler" Lewis, Wladek Zbyszko, and Jim Londos.

== Professional wrestling career ==
Over his long career, he wrestled under 3 successively simplified versions of his surname, namely Schickat, Schikat, and Shikat.

One of Shikat's most notorious moments was on 2 March 1936, when Danno O'Mahony lost his National Wrestling Association World Heavyweight Championship to Shikat at New York's Madison Square Garden. Shikat used his wrestling ability to genuinely hurt and punish O'Mahony, who tried to quit twice before the finish of the match. Shikat reportedly made the decision on his own, and following the win immediately put his title up for "sale" to various promoters. He eventually reached a deal with Billy Sandow. Paul Bowser, who held a management contract on Shikat, retaliated by booking him into various states without informing him. When Shikat failed to appear, he was frequently suspended by the local commissions. Later in March of that year, the Tennessee Athletic Commission suspended him, which triggered simultaneous suspension in 23 other states affiliated with the National Wrestling Association. In the aftermath of this, the behind-the-scenes negotiations were exposed in a court case, no fewer than five wrestlers were being billed as champions, and the sport's popularity fell.

== Championships and accomplishments ==
- Professional Wrestling
  - World Heavyweight Wrestling Championship (original version)
- National Wrestling Association
  - World Heavyweight Championship (1 time)
- New York State Athletic Commission
  - NYSAC World Heavyweight Championship (2 times)
- Championship Wrestling from Florida
  - NWA Florida Heavyweight Championship (1 time)
- Professional Wrestling Hall of Fame and Museum
  - Class of 2013
