= Earl Caddock =

American professional wrestler (1888–1950)

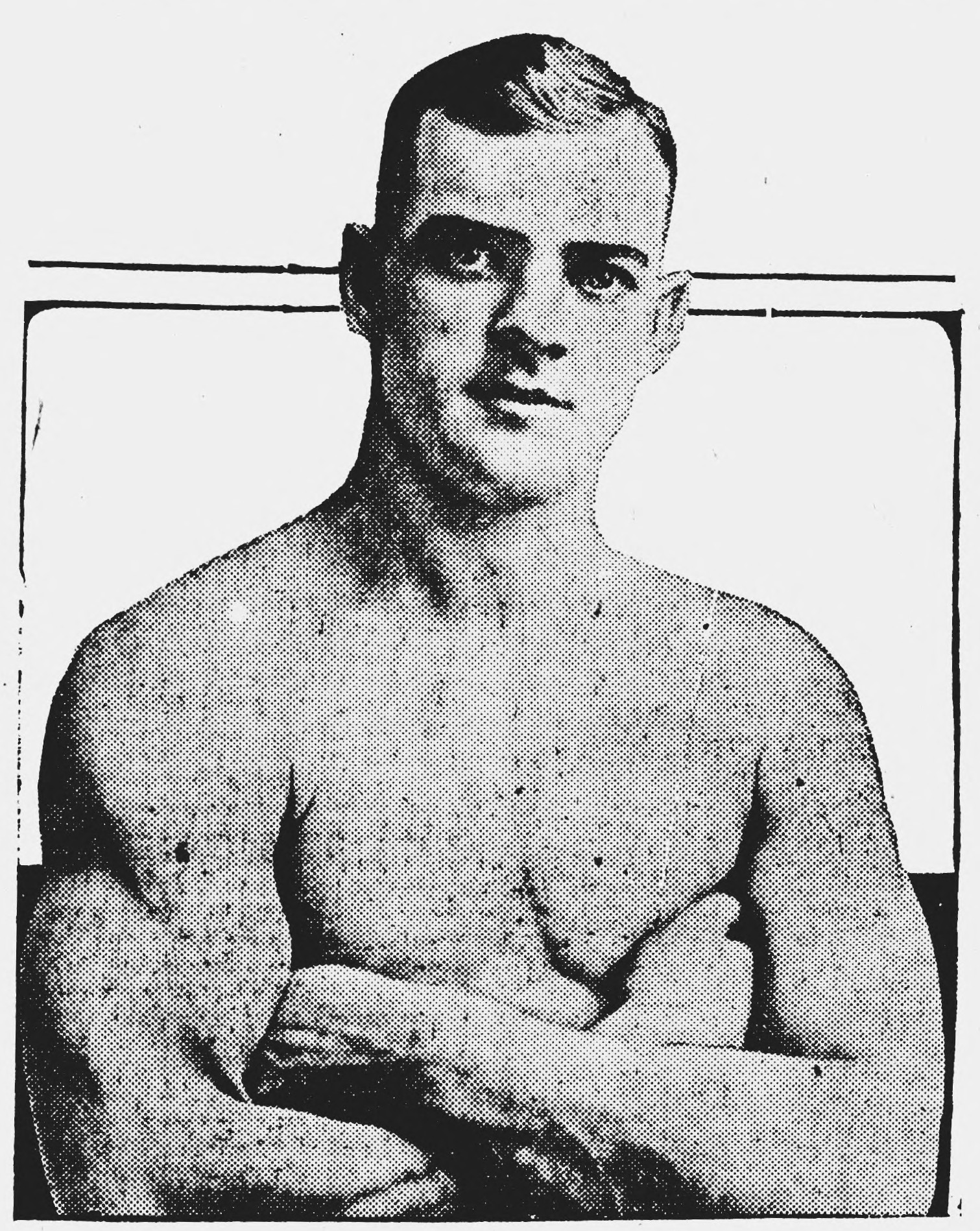

Personal information
- Born: 27 February 1888 Huron, South Dakota, U.S.
- Died: 25 August 1950 (aged 62) Walnut, Iowa, U.S.

Professional wrestling career
- Ring name: Earl Caddock
- Billed height: 5 ft 11 in (180 cm)
- Billed weight: 182 lb (83 kg)
- Trained by: Benny Reubin; Frank Gotch; Martin Burns
- Debut: June 8, 1915
- Retired: June 7, 1922

Earl Caddock (February 27, 1888 – August 25, 1950) was an American professional wrestler and World Heavyweight Champion who was active in the early portion of the twentieth century. As the first man to bill himself as "The Man of 1,000 Holds" (a nickname used many times since), Caddock was one of professional wrestling's biggest stars between the years of 1915 and 1922.

== Early life ==
Earl Caddock was born February 27, 1888, in Huron, South Dakota, to parents of German Jewish heritage. His family name may have been "Caddach," "Craddock," or "Caddack," but he used the spelling "Caddock" exclusively throughout his wrestling career.

As a child, he was diagnosed with tuberculosis and the family moved to Chicago where he could be treated. Swimming was recommended as part of this treatment and he was given a membership in the local YMCA to facilitate this. During his time at the YMCA young Earl Caddock was exposed to wrestling. After his father was killed in a bizarre accident in which he fell down a manhole, Earl Caddock moved to his uncle's farm in Anita, Iowa. He continued to wrestle and won many local championships.

== Amateur career ==
In 1907 Earl Caddock returned to Chicago to enter college. There he received further training from Benny Reubin and joined the Chicago Athletic Association. It was around this time that he met Charlie Cutler and Ernest Kartje, two professional wrestlers. From 1914 to 1915, Earl Caddock won the AAU Lightheavyweight Championship twice, and the AAU Heavyweight Championship once.

== Professional career ==
Through Cutler and Kartje, Caddock was introduced to Frank Gotch and Martin 'Farmer' Burns who began to train him for Professional wrestling. On June 8, 1915, Earl Caddock made his professional debut in a match against Jesse Westergaard. His popularity grew and on April 19, 1917, he defeated Joe Stecher for the World Heavyweight Championship in Omaha, Nebraska.

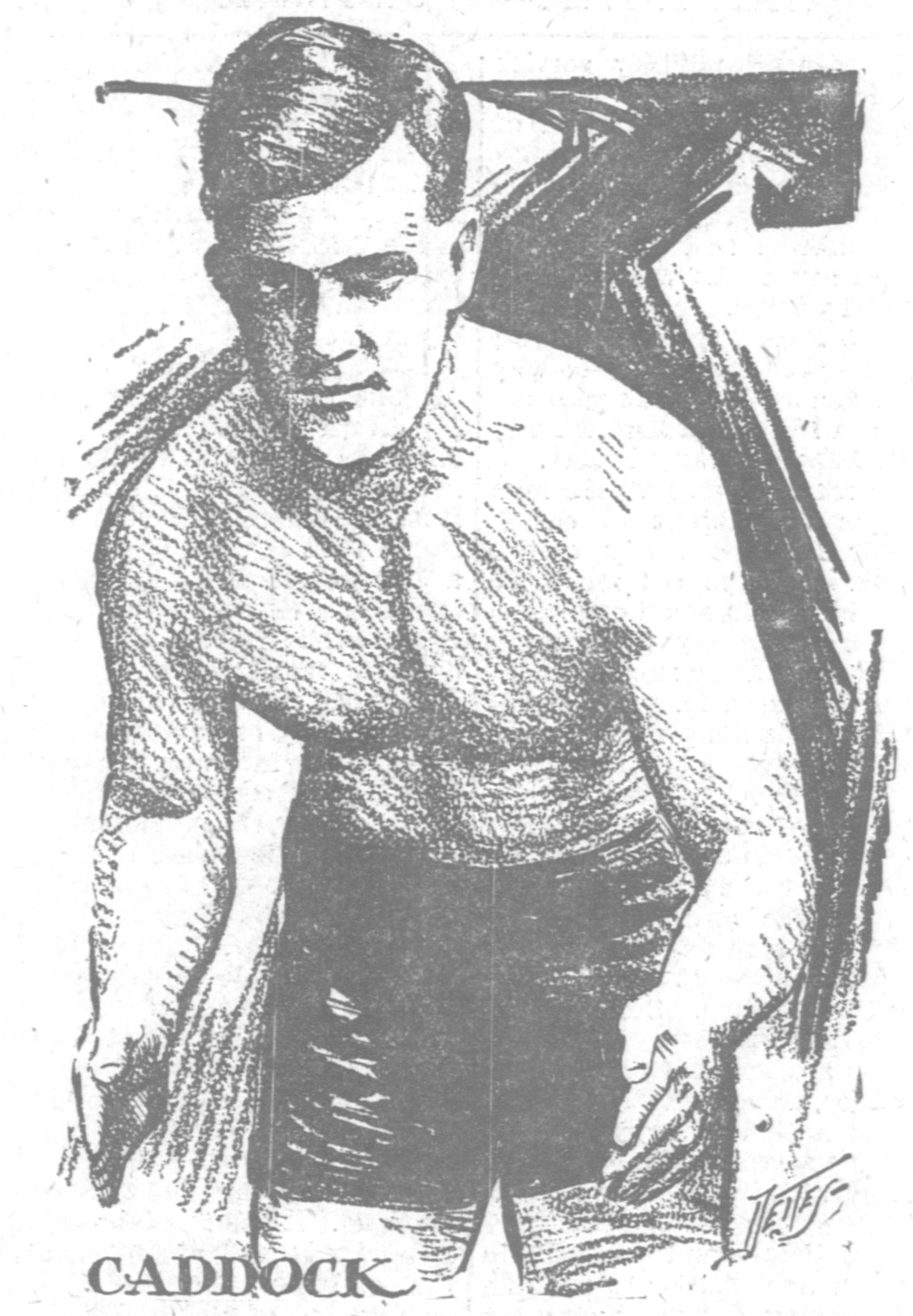
An illustration of Caddock following his first World Heavyweight Championship victory in 1917.

In December 1917 a tournament was held with the winner to be declared World Heavyweight Champion. Caddock walked out of this tournament over promoter Jack Curley's refusal to bill him as World Heavyweight Champion. Władek Zbyszko won the tournament and was declared the new World Heavyweight Champion. The appetite for a match between Caddock and Zbyszko was fierce and on February 8, 1918, it happened. The result was predictable with Caddock once again becoming World Heavyweight Champion. In August of that year his wrestling career was temporarily put on hold for his service in the First World War.

Caddock was discharged from the Army on June 1, 1919, and he returned to his career in wrestling. The World Heavyweight Championship had changed hands a few times while he was at war and was once again held by Joe Stecher. A match between the two was immediately set. On January 30, 1920, fans packed Madison Square Garden to see Stecher defeat Caddock. This match was filmed by pioneer cinematographer Freeman Harrison Owens, and is currently the oldest surviving filming of a professional wrestling match. Video on YouTube

Caddock's career continued successfully for the next few years but he wouldn't be in another World Title match until 1921. In January of that year Caddock faced Ed "Strangler" Lewis for the championship. Caddock's loss to Lewis in this match resulted in a near riot. Another title match in November against Stanislaus Zbyszko resulted in another failure to recapture the World Heavyweight Championship.

Earl Caddock's final match took place on June 7, 1922. He lost his last bid to regain the World Heavyweight Title to Ed Lewis.

== Retirement from pro wrestling ==
After he retired from wrestling Earl Caddock would continue to run his own business which he started while still wrestling. He ran a Ford agency selling cars, tractors and heavy machinery to farmers in Walnut, Iowa. He would also go on to become President of the United Petroleum Corporation. Earl Caddock died in 1950 after major surgery for a heart attack.

== Championships and accomplishments ==
=== Amateur Wrestling ===
- Amateur Athletic Union
  - AAU Light Heavyweight Championship (2 times)
  - AAU Heavyweight Championship (1 time)

=== Professional Wrestling ===
- George Tragos/Lou Thesz Professional Wrestling Hall of Fame
  - Class of 2000
- Professional Wrestling Hall of Fame
  - Class of 2007
- Wrestling Observer Newsletter
  - Wrestling Observer Newsletter Hall of Fame (Class of 2003)
- Other Titles
  - World Heavyweight Championship (Catch as Catch Can version) (1 time)
