= Billy Sandow =

American wrestler and promoter (1884–1972)

- Sandow as a professional wrestler, "Young Muldoon", at the start of the 20th century

Personal information
- Born: Wilhelm Baumann; September 4, 1884 Rochester, New York, U.S.
- Died: September 15, 1972 (aged 88) Portland, Oregon, U.S.

Professional wrestling career
- Ring name(s): Billy Sandow; Young Muldoon

Wilhelm Baumann (September 4, 1884 – September 15, 1972), better known as Billy Sandow, was an American professional wrestler and promoter.

== Biography ==
Sandow is best remembered as the manager of professional wrestler Ed "Strangler" Lewis and a subsequent member of the famed Gold Dust Trio promotion that changed the face of the industry during the 1920s (along with Lewis and Joseph "Toots" Mondt). He may have taken his ring name from Eugen Sandow, a professional wrestler and strongman in the late 19th century; in turn, former WWE wrestler Damien Sandow would adopt his own ring name in honor of Sandow almost a century later. Sandow also served as manager for such wrestling champions as Billy Jenkins, Marin Plestina, Jumping Joe Savoldi and Everett Marshall, and also used the ring name The Zebra Kid in 1951. He was a charter inductee of the Wrestling Observer Newsletter Hall of Fame in 1996.

Sandow and his brother, Max Baumann, traveled together to promote wrestling events. They also promoted events in Georgia. Sandow met his star attraction Lewis during World War I, when Sandow was teaching recruits hand-to-hand fighting techniques. Sandow was credited with helping to develop Lewis' famed headlock. The two men were linked in the public eye, and in 1926, Sandow and Lewis published an eight-volume collection of preferred training and fighting techniques, which they dubbed "kinetic stress."

As the 1920s dawned, the popularity of professional wrestling was dimming, mostly due to the slow-paced "mat wrestling" style which had become dominant. Promoters like Sandow and Toots Mondt were eager to liven up their exhibitions with a more crowd-pleasing style. Time limits were instituted, and events were held in more major arenas. They took control of all aspects of the pseudo-sport, by booking, training, managing and promoting. Along with Lewis, the threesome swiftly took the lead in promoting wrestling around the country, signing some of the top wrestlers to exclusive contracts. The partnership dissolved in the mid-1930s.

Sandow died on September 15, 1972, at age 88.

== Dempsey challenge ==
In 1922, Sandow issued a public $10,000 challenge to the heavyweight champion boxer of the world, Jack Dempsey, further declaring, "My personal wager of $5,000 still stands that Lewis can beat Dempsey inside of 20 minutes in any ring in the world." Dempsey's manager Jack Kearns issued a response, and the matter cooled. But by the end of the year, Sandow's offer was receiving renewed coverage by the press, including the Chicago Tribune, which published the speculative results of a Lewis-Dempsey match. Lewis won in 38 minutes.

In December, Dempsey told a reporter, "I think I'd be mighty tempted to try to beat that wrestler at his own game. I've done a lot of wrestling as part of my preliminary training and I think I've got the old toehold and headlock down close to perfection. If I can win the first fall from him, I'll begin to use my fists. But I've got a funny little hunch that maybe I can dump him without rapping him on the chin." Lewis thought that he would have the advantage: "You must understand that in such a contest I would be allowed to use my feet and legs... In doing so, I believe I could break the leg of a man like Dempsey, who is not used to wrestling... Of course there is one chance in a thousand that he might hit me with a punch hard enough to knock me out before I could get hold of him, but that is only one chance. I am sincere about the match, and will put up $25,000 in real money to bet that I can beat him." At one point, negotiations for the match appeared sincere. Sandow met with Dempsey's manager in Los Angeles, and reports of a contract emerged. But the match was never officially scheduled. Decades later, Sports Illustrated postulated that Kearns was happy to keep the talk alive for publicity purposes, but never had any intention of putting Dempsey into an uncontrolled environment with a "shooting" wrestler.

== Awards and accomplishments ==
- Wrestling Observer Newsletter
  - Wrestling Observer Newsletter Hall of Fame (Class of 1996)

== Selected publications ==
- Self Defense for the Individual (1919)
