= Dean Detton =

American professional wrestler

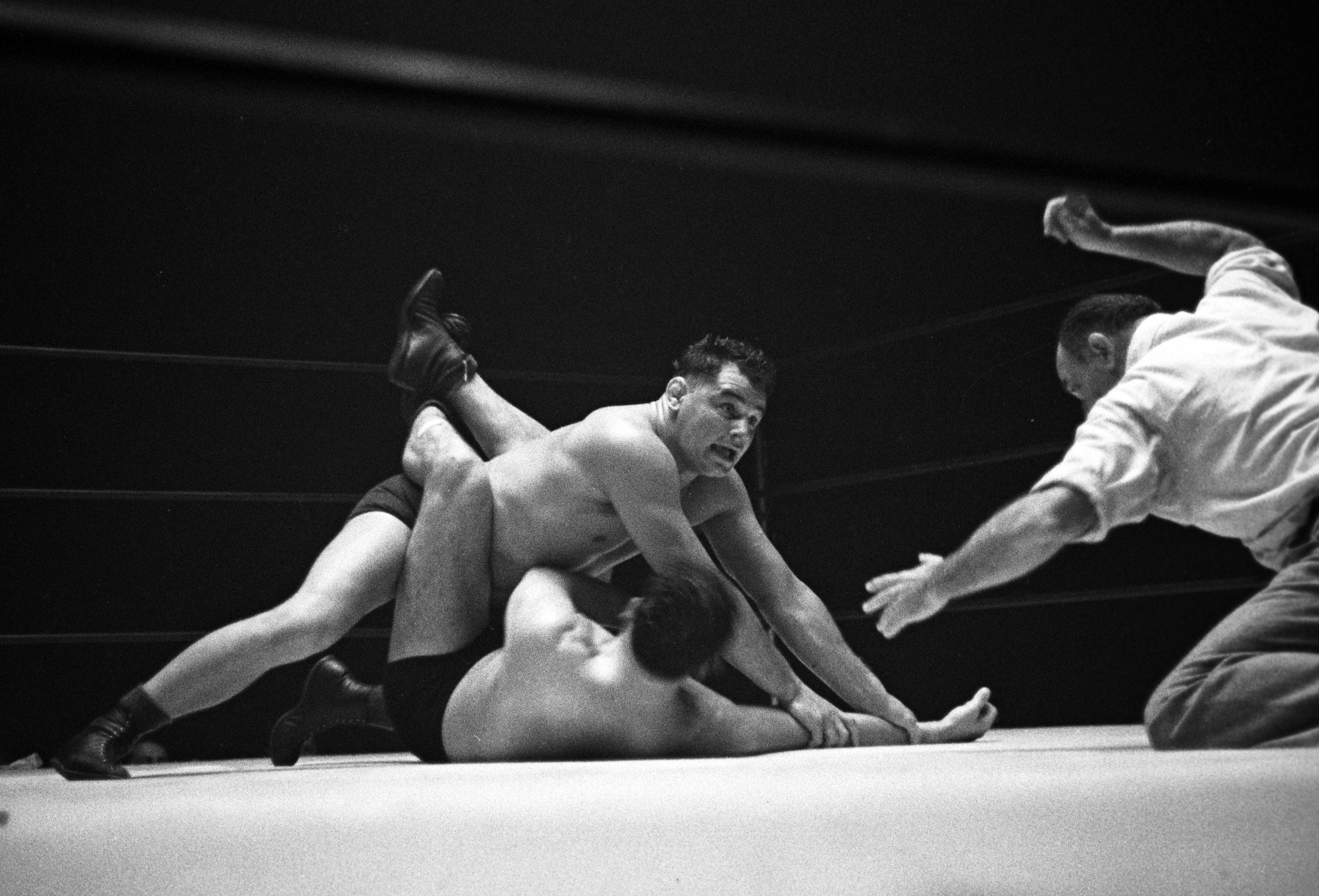
- Detton (top) in 1937

Personal information
- Born: Dean Henry Detton; June 27, 1908 Richmond, Utah, United States
- Died: February 23, 1958 (aged 49)
- Education: University of Utah

Professional wrestling career
- Ring name: Dean Detton
- Billed height: 5 ft 10 in (178 cm)
- Billed weight: 202 lb (92 kg)
- Retired: 1951

Dean Henry Detton (June 27, 1908 – February 23, 1958) was an American professional wrestler and World Heavyweight Champion who was active in the early portion of the twentieth century. Previously he was a proficient University of Utah football player. Detton was born in Richmond, Utah and raised Mormon. He retired from wrestling in 1951 and then ran a bar, The Turf Club, where he eventually hanged himself.

For his last 14 years he had lived in Hayward, California.

== Championships and accomplishments ==
- 50th State Big Time Wrestling
  - NWA Hawaii Heavyweight Championship
- California State Athletic Commission
  - World Heavyweight Championship (Los Angeles version) (1 time)
- New York State Athletic Commission
  - New York State Athletic Commission World Heavyweight Championship (1 time)
- NWA New Zealand
  - NWA New Zealand Heavyweight Championship
- Other titles
  - World Heavyweight Championship (1 time)
  - NWA World Heavyweight Championship (1 time(Recognition later withdrawn))

== See also ==
- List of premature professional wrestling deaths
