= Adams, Pennsylvania =

Coordinates: 40.9411749°N 79.6422699°W

Adams is a historic community located in Armstrong County, Pennsylvania. It is near the Allegheny River.

== Sources ==
- Platt, William G. (1879). Report of Progress in Armstrong County.
- Harrisburg, PA: Pennsylvania Geological Survey, 2nd series, H5, lxvill, 388 p. geol map. scale 1 in.=2 mi.
- Adams, Pennsylvania, Geographic Names Information System, U.S. Geological Survey.
