= Ali Baba (wrestler) =

Armenian-American professional wrestler (1901–1981)

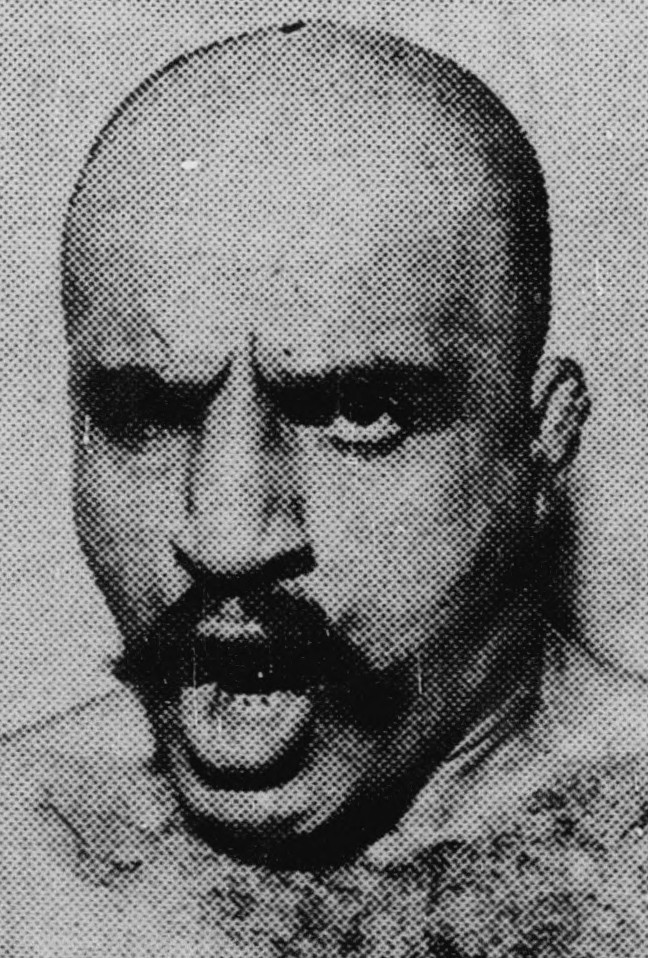

Personal information
- Born: Arteen Ekizian; September 28, 1901 Samsun, Ottoman Empire
- Died: November 16, 1981 (aged 80) San Luis Obispo, California, U.S.

Professional wrestling career
- Ring name(s): Ali Baba; Ali Yumid; Harry Eikasian; Harry Ekezian; Harry Ekizian
- Debut: 1918
- Retired: 1955

Arteen Ekizian (September 28, 1901 – November 16, 1981), better known by the ring name Ali Baba, was an Armenian professional wrestler and World Heavyweight Champion who was active in the early portion of the twentieth century.

== Early life ==
Ekizian was born in Samsun, Ottoman Empire. he escaped and moved to the United States in 1920 with help from his uncle Garabed in Massachusetts.

== Career ==
Ekizian began amateur wrestling while serving in the United States Navy. He became the Fleet Championship in the middleweight, light heavyweight, and heavyweight divisions. After an international match in Copenhagen, Ekizian was awarded the title of World Champion Navy Wrestler and, in 1927, was honored at a White House Reception by President Calvin Coolidge. Ekizian started a professional wrestling career in 1932 after leaving the navy and moved to Los Angeles. On April 24, 1936, Ekizian defeated World Heavyweight Champion Dick Shikat in front of over 8,000 spectators in Detroit, Michigan. A rematch for the title took place on May 5 in Madison Square Garden. Ekizian won again and was formally declared the World Heavyweight Champion.

== Personal life ==
He was married to Alice Elizabeth Bagdoian. They had three children together. Ekizian was a devout Christian.

== Championships and accomplishments ==
- New York State Athletic Commission
  - NYSAC World Heavyweight Championship (1 time)
- Other
  - World Heavyweight Wrestling Championship (original version) (1 time)
