= Władek Zbyszko =

Polish catch wrestler, professional wrestler and strongman (1892–1968)

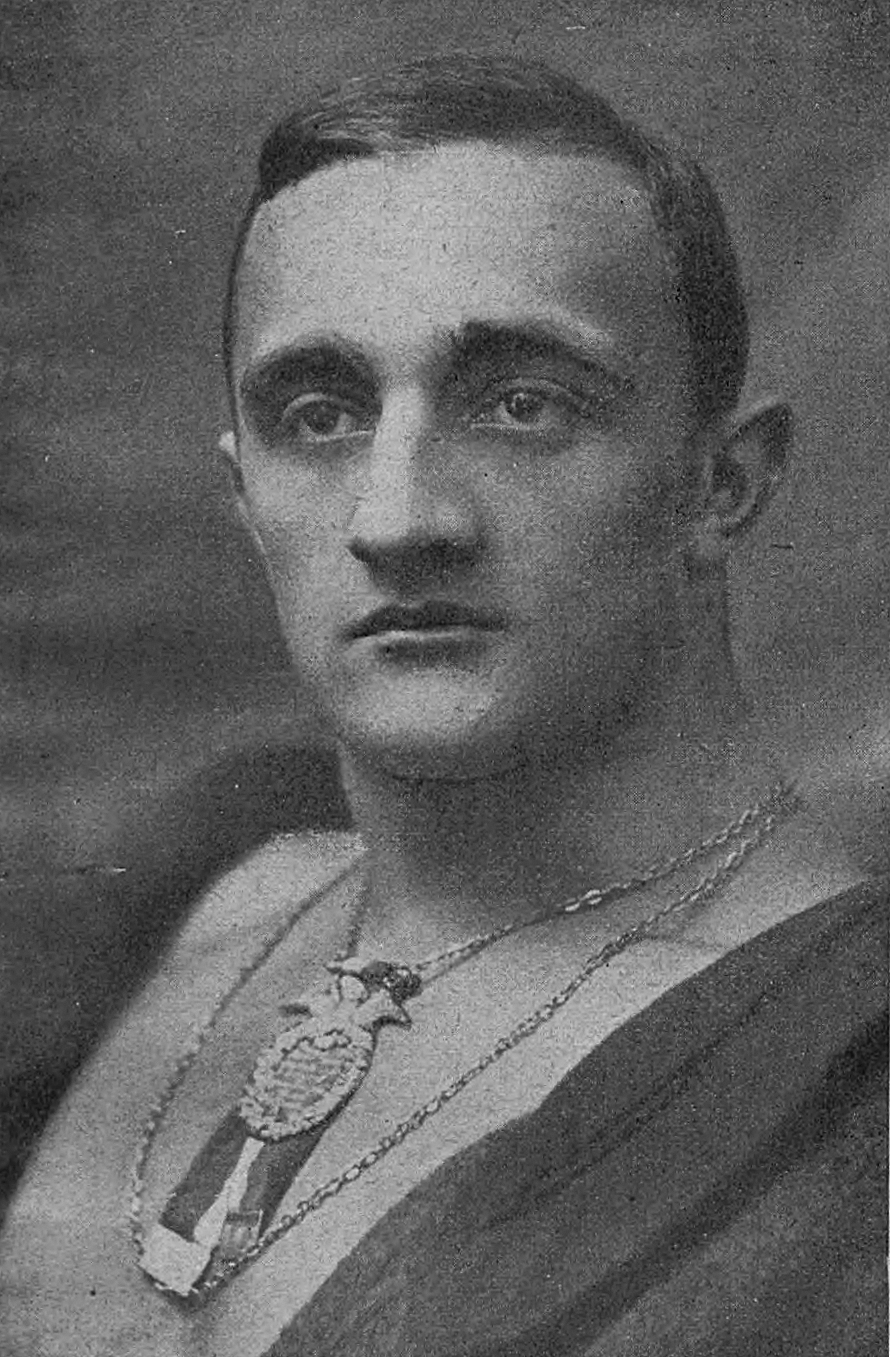
- Zbyszko in 1918

Personal information
- Born: Władysław Cyganiewicz; November 30, 1892 Grand Duchy of Kraków, Austria-Hungary (now Poland)
- Died: June 10, 1968 (aged 76) Savannah, Missouri, U.S.
- Education: University of Krakow; University of Vienna
- Family: Stanislaus Zbyszko (brother)

Professional wrestling career
- Ring name(s): Great Apollo; Władek Cyganiewicz; Władek Zbyszko
- Billed weight: 225 lb (16 st 1 lb; 102 kg)
- Trained by: Stanislaus Zbyszko
- Debut: 1911
- Retired: 1950

Władysław Cyganiewicz (November 30, 1892 – June 10, 1968), better known by the ring name Władek Zbyszko (Polish: [ˈvwadɛk ˈzbɨʂkɔ]), was a Polish catch wrestler, professional wrestler and strongman. "Zbyszko" was his older brother Stanislaus Zbyszko's childhood nickname, borrowed from a fictional medieval knight in the novel Krzyżacy; both brothers used it as their ring name.

== Personal life ==
Władysław Cyganiewicz was born in 1892 in the Grand Duchy of Kraków, then part of Austria-Hungary. He studied at the University of Krakow and would later receive a degree in law from the University of Vienna. Besides his exploits in the ring he was also considered an excellent pianist.

== Professional wrestling career ==
Cyganiewicz followed his other brother Stanislaus Zbyszko into a career in professional wrestling adopting the "Zbyszko" surname as his ring name. He began his career in Europe but emigrated to the United States of America in the 1910s, where he was billed as the "Youngest European Champion" ever. He made his American debut on January 17, 1913 in Chicago defeating his opponent, Alexander Angeloff, in short order. On January 8, 1917, Zbyszko defeated Ed "Strangler" Lewis to win the American Heavyweight Championship, considered one of the original nationally recognized championships in professional wrestling. Zbyszko claimed the Boston version of the AWA World Heavyweight Championship after defeating the champion Ed Lewis in one fall on June 5, 1917.

After the match Zbyszko claimed to be the champion while Lewis disputed that claim. On July 4, 1917 in Boston he lost to Lewis, only to defeat him again on December 22, 1917 in New York to further his claim to the championship, a claim also made by Joe Stecher and Lewis. Zbyszko lost his version of the World Heavyweight Championship to Earl Caddock on February 8, 1918 in Des Moines, and lost again to Ed Lewis on May 19, 1918 to end his claim to the championship. Zbyszko lost to Gobar Guha on June 20, 1921 in St. Louis.

Wladek Zbyszko was still billed as the American Heavyweight Champion as late as September 22, 1922 after which that title was abandoned in lieu of various "World" Championships. Over the years the Zbyszko brothers would toured both through Europe as well as South America, at times bringing with them a troupe of American wrestlers to put on shows.

During one such tour of Brazil, Zbyszko had a match against Hélio Gracie on July 28, 1934, which went to a draw. Historian Dave Meltzer described the bout as "one of the most famous matches in Brazil of that era, and a key in the building of the Gracie legacy. It is unknown whether the match was a work, a shoot, or something in between." Zbyszko faced Helio's brother George Gracie on October 6, 1934 in a "similar style match"; that resulted in Zbyszko defeating George Gracie by armlock. Zybszko wrestled as late as 1950 before retiring to a farm in Savannah, Missouri. He died on June 10, 1968, aged 76.

== Championships and accomplishments ==
- American Wrestling Association (Boston)
  - AWA World Heavyweight Championship (Boston version) (3 times, disputed)
- Other Titles
  - American Heavyweight Championship (1 time)
- Professional Wrestling Hall of Fame and Museum
  - Pioneer Era: Class of 2009
- Wrestling Observer Newsletter
  - Wrestling Observer Newsletter Hall of Fame: Class of 2010
