= Everett Marshall =

American professional wrestler

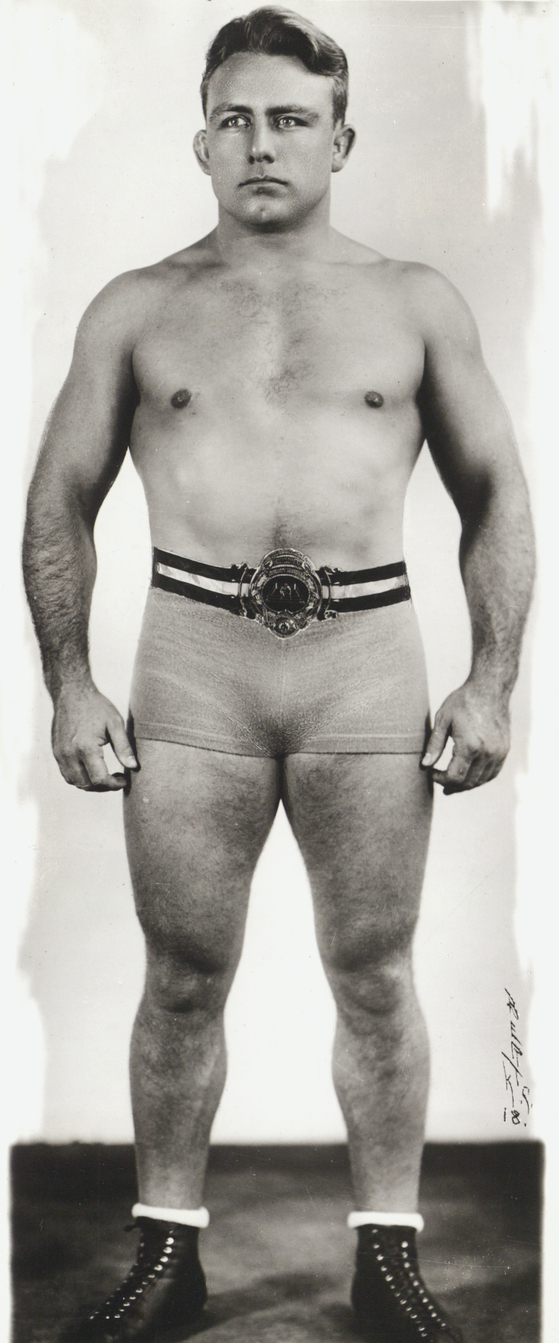

Personal information
- Born: November 4, 1905 La Junta, Colorado, U.S.
- Died: February 10, 1973 (aged 67)

Professional wrestling career
- Ring name: Everett Marshall
- Debut: 1928
- Retired: 1949

Everett Marshall (November 4, 1905 – February 10, 1973) was an American professional wrestler, who won championship titles in the Midwest Wrestling Association (MWA), National Wrestling Association (NWA) and Rocky Mountains.

== Early life ==
Everett Marshall was born on November 4, 1905, in La Junta, Colorado, to Claude and Pearl Marshall.

== Professional wrestling career ==
Known for his toughness and tenacity, Marshall frequently used armlocks and armpulls. His finisher was the airplane spin.

Marshall won the Ohio version of the MWA World Heavyweight Championship in 1935. John Pesek previously held the title. The MWA awarded the title to Ray Steele in February 1937. After Steele was injured in a car accident, Marshall was again awarded the title.

In May 1937, Marshall defeated Chief Little Beaver for the NWA Texas World Heavyweight Championship.

Marshall met Ali Baba for the NWA World Heavyweight Championship in June 1936 at Red Bird Stadium in Columbus, Ohio. Marshall defeated Ali Baba to claim the title, but it is not recognized. The title was awarded to John Pesek when Pesek was the only contender to post a $1,000 bond. Pesek's recognition as champion was then withdrawn and the title was awarded back to Marshall at the 1938 NBA/NWA annual meeting. In February 1939, Lou Thesz defeated Marshall for the title in St. Louis, Missouri.

Marshall held the Rock Mountain Heavyweight Championship at various times in 1945-1947.

== Championships and accomplishments ==
- Midwest Wrestling Association
  - MWA World Heavyweight Championship (Ohio version) (1 time)
- National Wrestling Association
  - NWA World Heavyweight Championship (1 time)
- National Wrestling Alliance
  - NWA Hall of Fame (2017)
- Professional Wrestling Hall of Fame and Museum
  - Inductee (Class of 2011)
- Wrestling Observer Newsletter
  - Hall of Fame (Class of 2009)
