= Jim Browning (wrestler) =

American professional wrestler

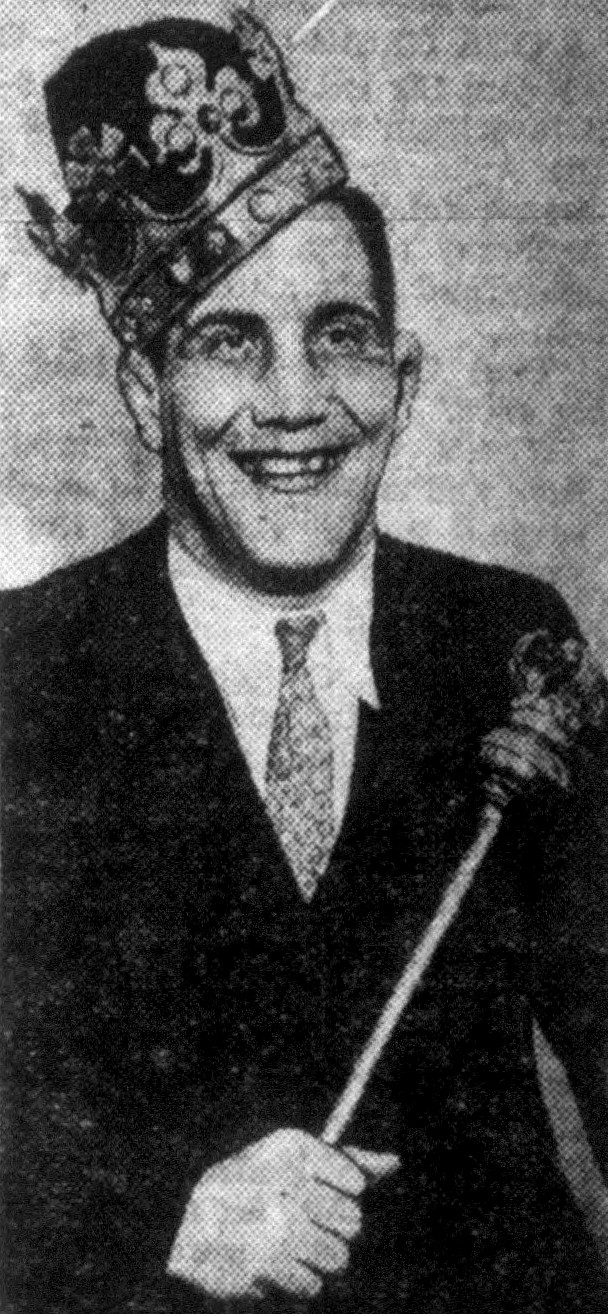
- Browning, circa 1933

Personal information
- Born: James Orville Browning; March 31, 1903 Verona, Missouri, U.S.
- Died: June 19, 1936 (aged 33) Rochester, Minnesota, U.S.
- Cause of death: Pulmonary embolism

Professional wrestling career
- Ring name(s): Jim Browning; Young Stecher
- Billed height: 6 ft 2 in (188 cm)
- Billed weight: 225 lb (102 kg)
- Debut: 1923
- Retired: February 1936

James Orville Browning (March 31, 1903 – June 19, 1936) was an American professional wrestler.

== Professional wrestling career ==
Browning was raised on a farm in Missouri. After working in construction and on oil fields, Browning made his debut in professional wrestling in 1923. he went on to work in many territories in the United States and Canada, feuding with wrestlers such as Jim Londos, Joe Stecher, and Ed "Strangler" Lewis. He was managed by Frank Smith.

On February 20, 1933, Browning defeated Ed "Strangler" Lewis for the New York State Athletic Commission World Heavyweight Championship in Madison Square Gardens with an airplane scissors hold. He held the championship for 490 days, during which time he drew large crowds. On June 25, 1934, Browning dropped the title to Jim Londos.

Browning retired from wrestling in February 1936 due to ill health (trachoma, an ulcerated stomach, and liver problems).

== Death ==
Browning died on June 25, 1936, at the age of 33 from a pulmonary embolism resulting from abdominal surgery.

== Championships and accomplishments ==
- California State Athletic Commission
  - World Heavyweight Championship (Los Angeles version) (1 time)
- New York State Athletic Commission
  - New York State Athletic Commission World Heavyweight Championship (1 time)

== See also ==
- List of premature professional wrestling deaths
