= List of professional wrestling attendance records in Canada =

List of the largest attendances in the history of Canadian professional wrestling

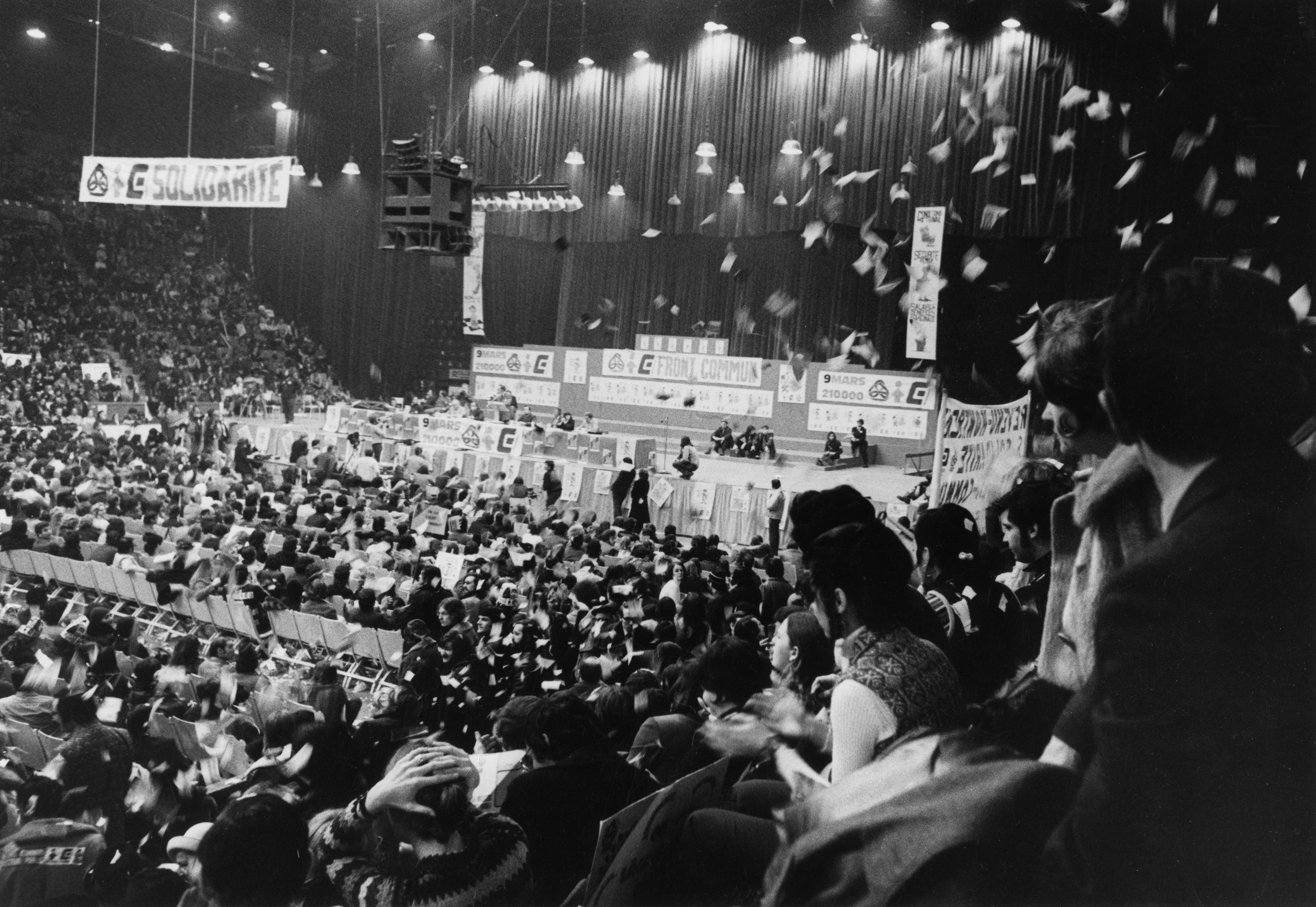
The Montreal Forum, one of Quebec's most popular wrestling venues during the "Territory-era", set numerous attendance records between 1936 and 1987.

The following is a list of professional wrestling attendance records in the Canada. The list is dominated by the American professional wrestling promotion World Wrestling Entertainment which has controlled the industry in North America since 2002. As the World Wrestling Federation, it became the first national promotion in the U.S. during the 1980s wrestling boom. The company forced Canada's three major promotions, Lutte Internationale, Maple Leaf Wrestling, and Stampede Wrestling, out of business during this period.

Canadian Athletic Promotions / International Wrestling Alliance, which controlled the National Wrestling Alliance's Quebec wrestling territory during the late 1940s and 1950s, still holds the most records of any province. Only nine of the attendances listed are from non-Canadian promotions, all exclusively held by WWE. Two of these are from WWE's flagship WrestleMania pay-per-view (PPV) event with 1990's Wrestlemania VI attracting 64,287 fans and grossing more than $3.4 million, the highest paid attendance for a pro wrestling show in North America. In addition, the February 8, 1999 edition of WWF Raw is the most attended taping in the show's history outside the United States. All of the events have been held in the Eastern Canada, with eight in Toronto, Ontario and twenty-three in Montreal, Quebec.

== Events and attendances ==
| Promotion | Event | Location | Venue | Attendance | Main Event(s) | Ref. |
|---|---|---|---|---|---|---|
| WWF | WrestleMania X8; March 17, 2002 | Toronto, Ontario | SkyDome | 68,237 | Chris Jericho (c) vs. Triple H for the WWE Undisputed Championship | |
| WWF | WrestleMania VI; April 1, 1990 | Toronto, Ontario | SkyDome | 64,287 | Hulk Hogan (WHC) vs. The Ultimate Warrior (IC) in a Champion vs. Champion match for the WWF World Heavyweight and WWF Intercontinental Championships | |
| WWF | The Big Event; August 28, 1986 | Toronto, Ontario | Exhibition Stadium | 64,000 | Hulk Hogan (c) vs. Paul Orndorff for the WWF World Heavyweight Championship | |
| WWF | WWF Raw; February 8, 1999 | Toronto, Ontario | SkyDome | 41,432 | Steve Austin vs. Vince McMahon, Ken Shamrock, Test, Kane, Chyna and Big Boss Man in a handicap elimination match | |
| GPW | Killer Kowalski vs. Mad Dog Vachon; July 14, 1973 | Montreal, Canada | Jarry Park Stadium | 29,127 | Killer Kowalski (c) vs. Mad Dog Vachon for the Grand Prix Heavyweight Championship | |
| ASW | Johnny Rougeau vs. Abdullah the Butcher; July 17, 1972 | Montreal, Canada | Jarry Park Stadium | 26,237 | Johnny Rougeau vs. Abdullah the Butcher | |
| IWA | Édouard Carpentier vs. Buddy Rogers; July 21, 1960 | Montreal, Canada | Delorimier Stadium | 25,703 | Édouard Carpentier vs. Buddy Rogers in a Best 2-out-of-3 Falls match | |
| WWF | WWF Raw (Ep. 195); January 31, 1997 | Toronto, Ontario | SkyDome | 25,628 | The Undertaker and Ahmed Johnson vs. Mankind and Faarooq in a No Holds Barred match | |
| IWA | Édouard Carpentier vs. Antonino Rocca; July 18, 1956 | Montreal, Canada | Delorimier Stadium | 23,227 | Édouard Carpentier vs. Antonino Rocca | |
| IWA | Gene Kiniski vs. Killer Kowalski; July 17, 1957 | Montreal, Canada | Delorimier Stadium | 21,851 | Gene Kiniski (c) vs. Killer Kowalski for the MAC International Heavyweight Championship | |
| WWF | Hulk Hogan vs. Don Muraco; August 18, 1986 | Montreal, Quebec | Montreal Forum | 21,700+ (Note: The exact attendance figure is unclear. There are different reports on the attendance of the event with numbers ranging from 21,700 to 23,000.) | Hulk Hogan (c) vs. Don Muraco for the WWF World Heavyweight Championship | |
| IWA | Yvon Robert vs. Pat O'Connor; August 18, 1954 | Montreal, Canada | Delorimier Stadium | 21,616 | Yvon Robert vs. Pat O'Connor in a Best 2-out-of-3 Falls match | |
| Lutte / WWF | Lutte vs. WWF (First Show); August 26, 1985 | Montreal, Quebec | Montreal Forum | 21,500 | Dino Bravo and King Tonga vs. The Iron Sheik and Nikolai Volkoff | |
| IWA | Édouard Carpentier vs. Killer Kowalski; August 15, 1956 | Montreal, Quebec | Delorimier Stadium | 21,454 | Killer Kowalski (c) vs. Édouard Carpentier for the MAC World Heavyweight Championship with special referee Rocky Marciano | |
| WWF | WWF Xperience; August 24, 1996 | Toronto, Ontario | CNE Stadium | 21,211 | Shawn Michaels (c) vs. Goldust in a ladder match for the WWF World Heavyweight Championship | |
| ASW | Ivan Koloff vs. Johnny Rougeau; November 11, 1968 | Montreal, Quebec | Montreal Forum | 20,890 | Ivan Koloff (c) vs. Johnny Rougeau in a Best 2-out-of-3 Falls match for the MAC International Heavyweight Championship | |
| IWA | Édouard Carpentier vs. Hans Schmidt; July 20, 1961 | Montreal, Quebec | Delorimier Stadium | 20,743 | Édouard Carpentier vs. Hans Schmidt | |
| MLW | Harley Race vs. Ric Flair; July 10, 1983 | Toronto, Ontario | CNE Stadium | 20,703 | Harley Race (c) vs. Ric Flair for the NWA World Heavyweight Championship | |
| WWF | Survivor Series; November 9, 1997 | Montreal, Quebec | Molson Centre | 20,593 | Bret Hart (c) vs. Shawn Michaels for the WWF World Heavyweight Championship | |
| IWA | Yukon Eric vs. Yvon Robert; August 14, 1950 | Montreal, Quebec | Delorimier Stadium | 20,461 | Yukon Eric (c) vs. Yvon Robert for the MAC International Heavyweight Championship | |
| GPW | Don Leo Jonathan vs. Jean Ferré; August 2, 1972 | Montreal, Canada | Montreal Forum | 20,347 | Don Leo Jonathan vs. Jean Ferré | |
| IWA | Wladek Kowalski vs. Yvon Robert; July 15, 1953 | Montreal, Quebec | Delorimier Stadium | 20,341 | Wladek Kowalski (c) vs. Yvon Robert for the MAC International Heavyweight Championship | |
| WWF | Randy Savage vs. Ricky Steamboat; January 9, 1987 | Montreal, Canada | Montreal Forum | 20,302 | Randy Savage (c) vs. Ricky Steamboat for the WWF Intercontinental Championship | |
| IWA | Édouard Carpentier vs. Killer Kowalski; August 8, 1956 | Montreal, Quebec | Delorimier Stadium | 20,139 | Édouard Carpentier vs. Killer Kowalski | |
| IWA | Édouard Carpentier vs. Killer Kowalski; August 7, 1957 | Montreal, Quebec | Delorimier Stadium | 20,000 | Édouard Carpentier vs. Killer Kowalski | |
| MLW | Tiger Jeet Singh vs. The Sheik; February 21, 1971 | Toronto, Ontario | Maple Leaf Gardens | 20,000 | Tiger Jeet Singh (c) vs. The Sheik for the NWA United States Heavyweight Championship | |
| ASW | Dick Taylor vs. Jacques Rougeau; July 30, 1973 | Montreal, Canada | Montreal Forum | 20,000 | Dick Taylor (c) vs. Jacques Rougeau for the IWA International Heavyweight Championship | |
| Lutte / WWF | Lutte vs. WWF (Final Show); January 13, 1986 | Montreal, Quebec | Montreal Forum | 20,000 | Hulk Hogan (c) vs. Bob Orton Jr. for the WWF World Heavyweight Championship | |
| IWA | Wladek Kowalski vs. Claude Dassary; August 26, 1958 | Montreal, Canada | Delorimier Stadium | 19,548 | Wladek Kowalski (c) vs. Claude Dassary in a Best 2-out-of-3 Falls match for the MAC International Heavyweight Championship | |
| Lutte | Rick Martel vs. Nick Bockwinkel; December 23, 1984 | Montreal, Quebec | Montreal Forum | 19,500 | Rick Martel (c) vs. Nick Bockwinkel for the AWA World Heavyweight Championship | |

== Historical ==
Top 10 most-attended shows in the 1900s
| No. | Promoter | Event | Location | Venue | Attendance | Main Event(s) |
|---|---|---|---|---|---|---|
| 1. | — | Eugene Tremblay vs. George Bothner; April 15, 1904 | Montreal, Quebec | Sohmer Park | 12,000 | Eugene Tremblay vs. George Bothner for the World Lightweight Championship |
| 2. | — | Frank Gotch vs. Dan McLeod; October 5, 1904 | New Westminster, British Columbia | Queen's Park Arena | 7,000 | Frank Gotch vs. Dan McLeod in a Best 2-out-of-3 Falls match |
| 3. | — | Paul Pons vs. Dan McLeod; March 11, 1901 | Montreal, Quebec | Sohmer Park | 6,000 | Paul Pons vs. Dan McLeod in a Handicap match; per the pre-match stipulation, Pons needed to pin McLeod five times within 60 min. |
| 3. | — | Frank Gotch vs. Fred Beel; May 24, 1907 | Montreal, Quebec | Sohmer Park | 6,000 | Frank Gotch vs. Fred Beel |
| 4. | — | George Hackenschmidt vs. Emil Maupas; May 8, 1905 | Montreal, Quebec | Sohmer Park | 5,000 | George Hackenschmidt vs. Emil Maupas in a Best 3-out-of-5 Falls match |
| 4. | — | Frank Gotch vs. KY Karakanoff; April 6, 1906 | Montreal, Quebec | Sohmer Park | 5,000 | Frank Gotch vs. KY Karakanoff |
| 5. | — | Eugene Tremblay vs. George Bothner; March 7, 1904 | Montreal, Quebec | | 4,500 | Eugene Tremblay vs. George Bothner for the World Lightweight Championship |
| 5. | — | Frank Gotch vs. Emile Maupas; December 29, 1904 | Montreal, Quebec | Sohmer Park | 4,500 | Frank Gotch vs. Emile Maupas |
| 6. | — | Raymond Cazeaux vs. Ferdinand Gruhn; April 3, 1908 | Montreal, Quebec | Sohmer Park | 4,000 | Raymond Cazeaux vs. Ferdinand Gruhn in a Best 2-out-of-3 Falls match |
| 7. | — | Frank Gotch vs. American Apollo; January 12, 1906 | Montreal, Quebec | Sohmer Park | 3,500 | Frank Gotch vs. American Apollo |
| 8. | — | Apollo vs. Yankee Rogers; November 10, 1905 | Montreal, Quebec | Sohmer Park | 3,000 | Apollo vs. Yankee Rogers in a Best 2-out-of-3 Falls match |
| 8. | — | Frank Gotch vs. Dan McLeod; December 22, 1905 | Montreal, Quebec | Sohmer Park | 3,000 | Frank Gotch vs. Dan McLeod in a Best 2-out-of-3 Falls match |
| 9. | — | Eugene Tremblay vs. Ladue; December 15, 1905 | Montreal, Quebec | Sohmer Park | 2,500 | Eugene Tremblay vs. Ladue in a Best 2-out-of-3 Falls match |
| 9. | — | Raymond Cazeaux vs. Yankee Rogers; February 14, 1908 | Montreal, Quebec | Sohmer Park | 2,500 | Raymond Cazeaux vs. Yankee Rogers in a Best 2-out-of-3 Falls match |
| 10. | — | International Graeco-Roman Tournament (Day 1); October 6, 1905 | Montreal, Quebec | Sohmer Park | 2,000 (Note: The exact attendance figure for the March 27, 1908 event is unknown, however, the venue was reportedly filled to capacity.) | 6-man round-robin Graeco-Roman tournament |
| 10. | — | International Graeco-Roman Tournament (Day 3); October 20, 1905 | Montreal, Quebec | Sohmer Park | 2,000 | 6-man round-robin Graeco-Roman tournament |
| 10. | — | International Wrestling Tournament; December 7, 1905 | Montreal, Quebec | Sohmer Park | 2,000 | Carl Busch vs. Mueller in a tournament final |
| 10. | — | Raymond Cazeaux vs. George Turner; March 27, 1908 | Montreal, Quebec | Sohmer Park | 2,000 | Raymond Cazeaux vs. George Turner in a Best 2-out-of-3 Falls match |
| 10. | — | Raymond Cazeaux vs. Charles Hackenschmidt; May 8, 1908 | Montreal, Quebec | Sohmer Park | 2,000 | Raymond Cazeaux vs. Charles Hackenschmidt in a Best 2-out-of-3 Falls match |

Top 10 most-attended shows in the 1910s
| No. | Promotion | Event | Location | Venue | Attendance | Main Event(s) |
|---|---|---|---|---|---|---|
| 1. | CAC | Stanislaus Zbyszko vs. Constant Le Marin; May 24, 1913 | Montreal, Quebec | Mount Royal Arena | 12,000 | Stanislaus Zbyszko vs. Constant Le Marin |
| 2. | CAC | Stanislaus Zbyszko vs. Raoul de Rouen; May 27, 1914 | Montreal, Quebec | Sohmer Park | 10,000 | Stanislaus Zbyszko vs. Raoul de Rouen |
| 3. | CAC | Eugene Tremblay vs. Fred Lapointe; July 4, 1910 | Montreal, Quebec | National Grounds | 5,000 | Eugene Tremblay vs. Fred Lapointe in a Best 2-out-of-3 Falls match for the Lightweight Championship |
| 3. | CAC | Raymond Cazeaux vs. Emilo Silva; October 15, 1913 | Montreal, Quebec | Sohmer Park | 5,000 | Raymond Cazeaux vs. Emilo Silva |
| 4. | — | Young Olson vs. Otto Oppelt; January 29, 1911 | St. John's, Newfoundland and Labrador | CLB Armory | 4,000 | Young Olson vs. Otto Oppelt |
| 4. | CAC | Raymond Cazeaux vs. Karla; April 20, 1912 | Montreal, Quebec | Sohmer Park | 4,000 | Raymond Cazeaux vs. Karla in a Best 2-out-of-3 Falls match |
| 4. | — | Stanislaus Zbyszko vs. Raymond Cazeaux; February 17, 1913 | Montreal, Quebec | Sohmer Park | 4,000 | Stanislaus Zbyszko vs. Raymond Cazeaux in a Best 2-out-of-3 Falls match |
| 4. | — | Raymond Cazeaux vs. Dr. B. F. Roller; April 23, 1913 | Montreal, Quebec | Sohmer Park | 4,000 | Raymond Cazeaux vs. Dr. B. F. Roller in a Best 2-out-of-3 Falls match |
| 5. | CAC | Eugene Tremblay vs. Alfred Lapointe; October 26, 1910 | Montreal, Quebec | Sohmer Park | 3,000 (Note: The exact attendance figure for the September 24, 1913 event is unknown, however, it reportedly drew "several thousand people".) | Eugene Tremblay (c) vs. Alfred Lapointe in a Best 2-out-of-3 Falls match for the Lightweight Championship |
| 5. | CAC | Raymond Cazeaux vs. Ivan Romanoff; December 27, 1911 | Montreal, Quebec | Sohmer Park | 3,000 | Raymond Cazeaux vs. Ivan Romanoff in a Best 2-out-of-3 Falls match |
| 5. | — | Raymond Cazeaux vs. Dr. B. F. Roller; May 4, 1912 | Ottawa, Ontario | Dey's Arena | 3,000 | Raymond Cazeaux vs. Dr. B. F. Roller in a Best 2-out-of-3 Falls match |
| 5. | CAC | Eugene Tremblay vs. Peter Pronde; September 24, 1913 | Montreal, Quebec | Sohmer Park | 3,000 | Eugene Tremblay (c) vs. Peter Pronde for the World Lightweight Championship |
| 6. | — | Raymond Cazeaux vs. Constant Le Marin; November 1, 1912 | Ottawa, Ontario | Dey's Arena | 2,000 | Raymond Cazeaux vs. Constant Le Marin in a Best 2-out-of-3 Falls match |
| 6. | — | Raymond Cazeaux vs. Charles Simard; October 31, 1913 | Ottawa, Ontario | Rideau Rink | 2,000 | Raymond Cazeaux vs. Charles Simard |
| 7. | — | Jack Taylor vs. Charles Cutler; November 25, 1914 | Winnipeg, Manitoba | Walker Theatre | 1,600 | Jack Taylor vs. Charles Cutler |
| 8. | — | Eugene Tremblay vs. Young Gotch; May 12, 1912 | Ottawa, Ontario | Day's Arena | 1,500 | Eugene Tremblay (c) vs. Young Gotch in a Best 2-out-of-3 Falls match for the World Lightweight Championship |
| 9. | — | Young Olson vs. Martin Rock; December 5, 1910 | St. John's, Newfoundland and Labrador | British Hall | 1,000 | Young Olson vs. Martin Rock |
| 9. | — | Eugene Tremblay vs. Young Gotch; January 16, 1914 | Thunder Bay, Ontario | | 1,000 | Eugene Tremblay (c) vs. Young Gotch for the World Lightweight Championship |
| 10. | CAC | Raymond Cazeaux vs. Dr. B. F. Roller; May 4, 1912 | Montreal, Quebec | Sohmer Park | Unknown (Note: The exact attendance figure is unknown, however, the event reportedly had a "record crowd" for Sohmer Park.) | Raymond Cazeaux vs. Dr. B. F. Roller in a Best 2-out-of-3 Falls match |

Top 10 most-attended shows in the 1920s
| No. | Promoter | Event | Location | Venue | Attendance | Main Event(s) |
|---|---|---|---|---|---|---|
| 1. | — | Henri Deglane vs. Stanislaus Zbyszko; September 17, 1928 | Montreal, Quebec | Mount Royal Arena | 9,000 | Henri Deglane vs. Stanislaus Zbyszko |
| 2. | — | Wladek Zbyszko vs. Robert Roth; May 12, 1924 | Montreal, Quebec | Mount Royal Arena | 7,000 | Wladek Zbyszko vs. Robert Roth |
| 2. | — | Renato Gardini vs. Stanislaus Zbyszko; October 1, 1928 | Montreal, Quebec | Mount Royal Arena | 7,000 | Renato Gardini vs. Stanislaus Zbyszko |
| 2. | — | Henri Deglane vs. Renato Gardini; October 23, 1928 | Montreal, Quebec | Mount Royal Arena | 7,000 | Henri Deglane vs. Renato Gardini |
| 3. | AWA | Jim Maloney vs. Renato Gardini; August 29, 1929 | Toronto, Ontario | Arena Gardens | 6,500 | Jim Maloney vs. Renato Gardini |
| 4. | — | Henri Deglane vs. Dan Petroff; July 23, 1928 | Montreal, Quebec | Mount Royal Arena | 6,000 | Henri Deglane vs. Dan Petroff in a Best 2-out-of-3 Falls match |
| 4. | — | Wladek Zbyszko vs. John Freberg; August 6, 1928 | Montreal, Quebec | Mount Royal Arena | 6,000 | Wladek Zbyszko vs. John Freberg |
| 4. | — | Henri Deglane vs. José Dominguez; September 24, 1928 | Montreal, Quebec | Mount Royal Arena | 6,000 | Henri Deglane vs. José Dominguez |
| 4. | AWA | Stanley Stasiak vs. Renato Gardini; August 15, 1929 | Toronto, Ontario | Arena Gardens | 6,000 | Stanley Stasiak vs. Renato Gardini |
| 5. | AWA | Jim Maloney vs. Stanley Stasiak; August 22, 1929 | Toronto, Ontario | Arena Gardens | 5,600 | Jim Maloney vs. Stanley Stasiak |
| 6. | Lucien Riopel | Henri Deglane vs. Jack Strahasky; August 20, 1928 | Montreal, Quebec | Mount Royal Arena | 5,500 | Henri Deglane vs. Jack Strahasky |
| 7. | — | Robert Roth vs. Frank Judson; May 3, 1924 | Montreal, Quebec | Mount Royal Arena | 5,000 | Robert Roth vs. Frank Judson |
| 7. | — | Robert Roth vs. Renato Gardini; May 10, 1924 | Montreal, Quebec | Mount Royal Arena | 5,000 | Robert Roth vs. Renato Gardini |
| 7. | — | Henri Deglane vs. Armand Zaharoff; August 27, 1928 | Montreal, Quebec | Mount Royal Arena | 5,000 | Henri Deglane vs. Armand Zaharoff |
| 7. | — | Wladek Zbyszko vs. Jim Maloney; August 1, 1929 | Toronto, Ontario | Arena Gardens | 5,000 | Wladek Zbyszko vs. Jim Maloney |
| 7. | AWA | Renato Gardini vs. Wladek Zbyszko; August 8, 1929 | Toronto, Ontario | Arena Gardens | 5,000 | Renato Gardini vs. Wladek Zbyszko |
| 7. | AWA | Ed Lewis vs. Dan Koloff; December 9, 1929 | Toronto, Ontario | Arena Gardens | 5,000 | Ed "Strangler" Lewis vs. Dan Koloff |
| 8. | EAC | Jack Taylor vs. Wladek Zbyszko; July 17, 1923 | Winnipeg, Manitoba | Amphitheatre Rink | 4,000 | Jack Taylor vs. Wladek Zbyszko in a Best 2-out-of-3 Falls match |
| 8. | — | Jack Taylor vs. Wladek Zbyszko; November 5, 1923 | Winnipeg, Manitoba | Amphitheatre Rink | 4,000 | Jack Taylor (c) vs. Wladek Zbyszko in a Best 2-out-of-3 Falls match for the Canadian Heavyweight Championship |
| 8. | — | Renato Gardini vs. Regis Siki; May 6, 1924 | Montreal, Quebec | Mount Royal Arena | 4,000 | Renato Gardini vs. Regis Siki |
| 8. | — | Henri Deglane vs. Ivan Zaharoff; June 18, 1928 | Montreal, Quebec | Mount Royal Arena | 4,000 | Henri Deglane vs. Ivan Zaharoff in a Best 2-out-of-3 Falls match |
| 9. | — | International Wrestling Tournament; April 21, 1924 | Montreal, Quebec | Mount Royal Arena | 3,500 | 8-man tournament |
| 9. | AWA | Wladek Zbyszko vs. George Hills; November 12, 1929 | Toronto, Ontario | Arena Gardens | 3,500 | Wladek Zbyszko vs. George Hills |
| 10. | — | Jack Taylor vs. Yussif Hussane; April 18, 1923 | Winnipeg, Manitoba | Board of Trade Building | 3,000 | Jack Taylor vs. Yussif Hussane |
| 10. | EAC | Jack Taylor vs. Taro Miyaki; May 18, 1923 | Winnipeg, Manitoba | Board of Trade Building | 3,000 | Jack Taylor vs. Taro Miyaki in a Best 2-out-of-3 Falls Wrestler vs. Judoka match |
| 10. | — | Jack Taylor vs. Frank Simmons; September 18, 1923 | Winnipeg, Manitoba | Amphitheatre Rink | 3,000 | Jack Taylor vs. Frank Simmons |
| 10. | — | Renato Gardini vs. Frank Hackenschmidt; April 29, 1924 | Montreal, Quebec | Mount Royal Arena | 3,000 | Renato Gardini vs. Frank Hackenschmidt |
| 10. | — | Ed Lewis vs. Dick Daviscourt; May 24, 1924 | Winnipeg, Manitoba | Amphitheatre Rink | 3,000 | Ed "Strangler" Lewis (c) vs. Dick Daviscourt for the World Heavyweight Championship |

Top 10 most-attended shows in the 1930s
| No. | Promotion | Event | Location | Venue | Attendance | Main Event(s) |
|---|---|---|---|---|---|---|
| 1. | MLW | Jim Londos vs. George Zaharias; January 14, 1932 | Toronto, Ontario | Maple Leaf Gardens | 17,000 | Jim Londos vs. George Zaharias |
| 2. | MLW | Jim Londos vs. Gino Garibaldi; November 19, 1931 | Toronto, Ontario | Maple Leaf Gardens | 15,800 | Jim Londos vs. Gino Garibaldi |
| 3. | MLW | Jim Londos vs. Vic Christy; February 14, 1935 | Toronto, Ontario | Toronto Auditorium | 14,000 | Jim Londos (c) vs. Vic Christy for the NWA World Heavyweight Championship |
| 4. | CAP | Yvon Robert vs. Cy Williams; September 30, 1936 | Montreal, Quebec | Montreal Forum | 12,000 | Yvon Robert (c) vs. Cy Williams in a Best 2-out-of-3 Falls match for the World Heavyweight Championship |
| 5. | MLW | Jim Londos vs. Joe Savoldi; November 22, 1934 | Toronto, Ontario | Maple Leaf Gardens | 11,000 | Jim Londos (c) vs. Joe Savoldi for the NWA World Heavyweight Championship |
| 6. | CAP | Danno O'Mahoney vs. Yvon Robert; July 16, 1936 | Montreal, Quebec | Montreal Forum | 10,000 | Danno O'Mahoney (c) vs. Yvon Robert in a Best 2-out-of-3 Falls match for the World Heavyweight Championship |
| 6. | MLW | Vic Christy vs. The Masked Marvel; June 9, 1938 | Toronto, Ontario | Maple Leaf Gardens | 10,000 | Vic Christy (c) vs. The Masked Marvel in a Best 2-out-of-3 Falls match for the World Heavyweight Championship |
| 6. | CAP | The Masked Marvel vs. Yvon Robert; August 24, 1938 | Montreal, Quebec | Montreal Forum | 10,000 | The Masked Marvel (c) vs. Yvon Robert in a Best 2-out-of-3 Falls match for the World Heavyweight Championship |
| 6. | CAP | The Masked Marvel vs. Yvon Robert; September 14, 1938 | Montreal, Quebec | Montreal Forum | 10,000 | The Masked Marvel (c) vs. Yvon Robert in a Best 2-out-of-3 Falls match for the World Heavyweight Championship |
| 7. | MLW | Jim Londos vs. Rudy Dusek; January 11, 1934 | Toronto, Ontario | Maple Leaf Gardens | 9,000 | Jim Londos vs. Rudy Dusek |
| 7. | CAP | Yvon Robert vs. Cy Williams; October 19, 1936 | Montreal, Quebec | Montreal Forum | 9,000 | Yvon Robert (c) vs. Cy Williams in a Best 2-out-of-3 Falls match for the World Heavyweight Championship |
| 8. | MLW | Danno O'Mahoney vs. Gino Garibaldi; June 13, 1935 | Toronto, Ontario | | 8,500 | Danno O'Mahoney vs. Gino Garibaldi |
| 9. | MLW | Joe Malcewicz vs. George Zaharias; April 26, 1934 | Toronto, Ontario | | 8,000 | Joe Malcewicz vs. George Zaharias |
| 9. | MLW | Jim Browning vs. Hans Steinke; September 20, 1934 | Toronto, Ontario | Maple Leaf Gardens | 8,000 | Jim Browning vs. Hans Steinke |
| 9. | CAP | Yvon Robert vs. Danno O'Mahoney; May 4, 1938 | Montreal, Quebec | Montreal Forum | 8,000 | Yvon Robert vs. Danno O'Mahoney in a Best 2-out-of-3 Falls match |
| 9. | CAP | Vic Christy vs. Felix Miquet; June 8, 1938 | Montreal, Quebec | Montreal Forum | 8,000 | Vic Christy (c) vs. Felix Miquet in a Best 2-out-of-3 Falls match for the World Heavyweight Championship |
| 10. | AWA | Ed Lewis vs. Henri Deglane; May 4, 1931 | Montreal, Quebec | Mount Royal Arena | 7,500 | Ed "Strangler" Lewis (c) vs. Henri Deglane in a Best 2-out-of-3 Falls match for the AWA World Heavyweight Championship |
| 10. | MLW | Ed Lewis vs. Howard Cantonwine; December 8, 1932 | Toronto, Ontario | | 7,500 | Ed "Strangler" Lewis vs. Howard Cantonwine |

Top 10 most-attended shows in the 1940s
| No. | Promotion | Event | Location | Venue | Attendance | Main Event(s) |
|---|---|---|---|---|---|---|
| 1. | CAP | Yvon Robert & Larry Moquin vs. The Dusek Riot Squad; July 18, 1945 | Montreal, Quebec | Montreal Forum | 18,000 | Yvon Robert and Larry Moquin vs. The Dusek Riot Squad (Emil Dusek and Rudy Dusek) |
| 2. | CAP | Yvon Robert vs. Gorgeous George; November 24, 1948 | Montreal, Quebec | Montreal Forum | 15,233 | Yvon Robert (c) vs. Gorgeous George for the World Heavyweight Championship |
| 3. | CAP | Yvon Robert vs. Primo Carnera; August 27, 1947 | Montreal, Quebec | Montreal Forum | 15,132 | Yvon Robert vs. Primo Carnera |
| 4. | CAP | Yvon Robert vs. Bill Longson; October 7, 1942 | Montreal, Quebec | Montreal Forum | 15,029 | Yvon Robert (c-CAP) vs. Bill Longson (c-NWA) in a Champion vs. Champion match for the NWA World Heavyweight Championship and World Heavyweight Championship |
| 5. | CAP | Bobby Managoff vs. Yvon Robert; August 5, 1943 | Montreal, Quebec | Delorimier Stadium | 15,000 | Bobby Managoff (c) vs. Yvon Robert for the World Heavyweight Championship |
| 5. | MLW | Whipper Billy Watson vs. Wladyslaw Talun; February 21, 1946 | Toronto, Ontario | | 15,000 | Whipper Billy Watson vs. Wladyslaw Talun |
| 6. | CAP | Yvon Robert & Larry Moquin vs. Friedrich Von Schacht & George Koverly; November 13, 1946 | Montreal, Quebec | Montreal Forum | 14,351 | Yvon Robert and Larry Moquin vs. Friedrich Von Schacht and George Koverly |
| 7. | CAP | Gorgeous George vs. Pete Peterson; October 20, 1948 | Montreal, Quebec | Montreal Forum | 14,004 | Gorgeous George vs. Pete Peterson |
| 8. | CAP | Yvon Robert vs. Bill Longson; August 19, 1942 | Montreal, Quebec | Montreal Forum | 14,000 | Yvon Robert (c-CAP) vs. Bill Longson (c-NWA) in a Champion vs. Champion match for the NWA World Heavyweight Championship and World Heavyweight Championship |
| 8. | MLW | Whipper Billy Watson vs. Wladyslaw Talun; February 14, 1946 | Toronto, Ontario | | 14,000 | Whipper Billy Watson vs. Wladyslaw Talun |
| 9. | MLW | Whipper Billy Watson vs. Wladyslaw Talun; February 28, 1946 | Toronto, Ontario | | 13,000 | Whipper Billy Watson vs. Wladyslaw Talun |
| 9. | CAP | Yvon Robert & Larry Moquin vs. The Dusek Riot Squad; April 24, 1946 | Montreal, Quebec | Montreal Forum | 13,000 | Yvon Robert and Larry Moquin vs. The Dusek Riot Squad (Ernie Dusek and Emil Dusek) |
| 10. | CAP | Yvon Robert & Larry Moquin vs. The Dusek Riot Squad; March 3, 1948 | Montreal, Quebec | Montreal Forum | 12,600 | Yvon Robert and Larry Moquin vs. The Dusek Riot Squad (Ernie Dusek and Emil Dusek) in a Best 2-out-of-3 Falls Tornado Rules match |

Top 10 most-attended shows in the 1950s
| No. | Promotion | Event | Location | Venue | Attendance | Main Event(s) |
|---|---|---|---|---|---|---|
| 1. | IWA | Édouard Carpentier vs. Antonino Rocca; July 18, 1956 | Montreal, Canada | Delorimier Stadium | 23,227 | Édouard Carpentier vs. Antonino Rocca |
| 2. | IWA | Gene Kiniski vs. Killer Kowalski; July 17, 1957 | Montreal, Canada | Delorimier Stadium | 21,851 | Gene Kiniski (c) vs. Killer Kowalski for the MAC International Heavyweight Championship |
| 3. | IWA | Yvon Robert vs. Pat O'Connor; August 18, 1954 | Montreal, Canada | Delorimier Stadium | 21,616 | Yvon Robert vs. Pat O'Connor in a Best 2-out-of-3 Falls match |
| 4. | IWA | Édouard Carpentier vs. Killer Kowalski; August 15, 1956 | Montreal, Quebec | Delorimier Stadium | 21,454 | Killer Kowalski (c) vs. Édouard Carpentier for the MAC World Heavyweight Championship with special referee Rocky Marciano |
| 5. | IWA | Yukon Eric vs. Yvon Robert; August 14, 1950 | Montreal, Quebec | Delorimier Stadium | 20,641 | Yukon Eric (c) vs. Yvon Robert for the MAC International Heavyweight Championship |
| 6. | IWA | Wladek Kowalski vs. Yvon Robert; July 15, 1953 | Montreal, Quebec | Delorimier Stadium | 20,341 | Wladek Kowalski (c) vs. Yvon Robert for the MAC International Heavyweight Championship |
| 7. | IWA | Édouard Carpentier vs. Killer Kowalski; August 8, 1956 | Montreal, Quebec | Delorimier Stadium | 20,139 | Édouard Carpentier vs. Killer Kowalski |
| 8. | IWA | Édouard Carpentier vs. Killer Kowalski; August 7, 1957 | Montreal, Quebec | Delorimier Stadium | 20,000 | Édouard Carpentier vs. Killer Kowalski |
| 9. | IWA | Wladek Kowalski vs. Claude Dassary; August 26, 1958 | Montreal, Quebec | Delorimier Stadium | 19,548 | Wladek Kowalski (c) vs. Claude Dassary in a Best 2-out-of-3 Falls match for the MAC International Heavyweight Championship |
| 10. | IWA | Don Leo Jonathan vs. Yvon Robert; August 17, 1955 | Montreal, Quebec | Delorimier Stadium | 18,972 | Don Leo Jonathan (c) vs. Yvon Robert for the IWA World/International Heavyweight Championship |

Top 10 most-attended shows in the 1960s
| No. | Promotion | Event | Location | Venue | Attendance | Main Event(s) |
|---|---|---|---|---|---|---|
| 1. | IWA | Édouard Carpentier vs. Buddy Rogers; July 21, 1960 | Montreal, Canada | Delorimier Stadium | 25,703 | Édouard Carpentier vs. Buddy Rogers in a Best 2-out-of-3 Falls match |
| 2. | ASW | Ivan Koloff vs. Johnny Rougeau; November 11, 1968 | Montreal, Quebec | Montreal Forum | 20,890 | Ivan Koloff (c) vs. Johnny Rougeau in a Best 2-out-of-3 Falls match for the MAC International Heavyweight Championship |
| 3. | IWA | Édouard Carpentier vs. Hans Schmidt; July 20, 1961 | Montreal, Quebec | Delorimier Stadium | 20,743 | Édouard Carpentier vs. Hans Schmidt |
| 4. | IWA | Antonino Rocca vs. The Great Togo; November 29, 1961 | Montreal, Quebec | Montreal Forum | 18,000 | Antonino Rocca vs. The Great Togo |
| 5. | ASW | Ivan Koloff vs. Johnny Rougeau; April 22, 1968 | Montreal, Quebec | Montreal Forum | 17,000 | Ivan Koloff (c) vs. Johnny Rougeau in a Best 2-out-of-3 Falls match for the IWA World/International Heavyweight Championship |
| 6. | MLW | The Sheik vs. Bobo Brazil; December 28, 1969 | Toronto, Ontario | Maple Leaf Gardens | 16,500 | The Sheik vs. Bobo Brazil in a Texas Death match |
| 7. | ASW | Buddy Rogers vs. Gene Kiniski; July 30, 1962 | Vancouver, British Columbia | Empire Stadium | 16,000 | Buddy Rogers (c) vs. Gene Kiniski for the NWA World Heavyweight Championship |
| 7. | ASW | Jacques Rougeau vs. Ivan Koloff; September 29, 1969 | Montreal, Quebec | Montreal Forum | 16,000 | Jacques Rougeau vs. Ivan Koloff |
| 8. | IWA | Jacques Rougeau vs. Abdullah the Butcher; November 24, 1969 | Montreal, Quebec | Montreal Forum | 15,778 | Jacques Rougeau (c) vs. Abdullah the Butcher for the IWA World/International Heavyweight Championship |
| 9. | IWA | Buddy Rogers vs. Argentina Rocca; March 9, 1960 | Montreal, Quebec | Montreal Forum | 15,206 | Buddy Rogers (c) vs. Argentina Rocca in a Best 2-out-of-3 Falls match for the NWA World Heavyweight Championship |
| 10. | MLW | The Sheik vs. Lord Athol Layton; November 2, 1969 | Toronto, Ontario | Maple Leaf Gardens | 15,000 | The Sheik vs. Lord Athol Layton |

Top 10 most-attended shows in the 1970s
| No. | Promotion | Event | Location | Venue | Attendance | Main Event(s) |
|---|---|---|---|---|---|---|
| 1. | GPW | Killer Kowalski vs. Mad Dog Vachon; July 14, 1973 | Montreal, Canada | Jarry Park Stadium | 29,127 | Killer Kowalski (c) vs. Mad Dog Vachon for the Grand Prix Heavyweight Championship |
| 2. | ASW | Johnny Rougeau vs. Abdullah the Butcher; July 17, 1972 | Montreal, Canada | Jarry Park Stadium | 26,237 | Johnny Rougeau vs. Abdullah the Butcher |
| 3. | GPW | Don Leo Jonathan vs. Jean Ferré; August 2, 1972 | Montreal, Canada | Montreal Forum | 20,347 | Don Leo Jonathan vs. Jean Ferré |
| 4. | MLW | Tiger Jeet Singh vs. The Sheik; February 21, 1971 | Toronto, Ontario | Maple Leaf Gardens | 20,000 | Tiger Jeet Singh (c) vs. The Sheik for the NWA United States Heavyweight Championship |
| 4. | ASW | Dick Taylor vs. Jacques Rougeau; July 30, 1973 | Montreal, Canada | Montreal Forum | 20,000 | Dick Taylor (c) vs. Jacques Rougeau for the IWA International Heavyweight Championship |
| 5. | MLW | Tiger Jeet Singh vs. The Sheik; March 14, 1971 | Toronto, Ontario | Maple Leaf Gardens | 18,000 | Tiger Jeet Singh (c) vs. The Sheik for the NWA United States Heavyweight Championship |
| 5. | MLW | The Sheik vs. Carlos Rocha; February 6, 1972 | Toronto, Ontario | Maple Leaf Gardens | 18,000 | The Sheik vs. Carlos Rocha |
| 5. | MLW | The Sheik vs. Carlos Rocha; February 20, 1972 | Toronto, Ontario | Maple Leaf Gardens | 18,000 | The Sheik vs. Carlos Rocha |
| 5. | MLW | The Sheik vs. Carlos Rocha; March 5, 1972 | Toronto, Ontario | Maple Leaf Gardens | 18,000 | The Sheik vs. Carlos Rocha |
| 5. | MLW | The Sheik vs. Andre the Giant; December 30, 1973 | Toronto, Ontario | Maple Leaf Gardens | 18,000 | The Sheik vs. Andre the Giant |
| 5. | ASW / GPW | Jacques Rougeau vs. Don Leo Jonathan; February 12, 1974 | Montreal, Quebec | Montreal Forum | 18,000 | Jacques Rougeau vs. Don Leo Jonathan |
| 6. | MLW | The Sheik vs. Whipper Billy Watson; November 15, 1970 | Toronto, Ontario | Maple Leaf Gardens | 17,000 | The Sheik vs. Whipper Billy Watson |
| 6. | MLW | Dory Funk Jr. vs. The Sheik; June 6, 1971 | Toronto, Ontario | Varsity Stadium | 17,000 | Dory Funk Jr. (c) vs. The Sheik for the NWA World Heavyweight Championship |
| 7. | MLW | The Sheik vs. Athol Layton; December 27, 1970 | Toronto, Ontario | Maple Leaf Gardens | 16,000 | The Sheik vs. Athol Layton |
| 7. | MLW | Tiger Jeet Singh vs. The Sheik; October 17, 1971 | Toronto, Ontario | Maple Leaf Gardens | 16,000 | Tiger Jeet Singh (c) vs. The Sheik in an Indian Strap match for the NWA United States Heavyweight Championship |
| 7. | MLW | The Sheik vs. Andre the Giant; February 10, 1974 | Toronto, Ontario | Maple Leaf Gardens | 16,000 | The Sheik vs. Andre the Giant |
| 7. | MLW | Harley Race vs. The Sheik; July 10, 1977 | Toronto, Ontario | Canadian National Exhibition Stadium | 16,000 | Harley Race (c) vs. The Sheik for the NWA World Heavyweight Championship |
| 8. | MLW | The Sheik vs. John Quinn; September 5, 1971 | Toronto, Ontario | Maple Leaf Gardens | 15,500 | The Sheik vs. John Quinn in a Death match |
| 9. | MLW | The Sheik vs. Johnny Valentine; December 17, 1972 | Toronto, Ontario | Maple Leaf Gardens | 15,300 | The Sheik vs. Johnny Valentine |
| 10. | ASW | Jacques Rougeau vs. Abdullah the Butcher; January 26, 1970 | Montreal, Quebec | Montreal Forum | 15,274 | Jacques Rougeau (c) vs. Abdullah the Butcher in a Best 2-out-of-3 Falls match for the IWA World/International Heavyweight Championship |

Top 10 most-attended shows in the 1980s
| No. | Promotion | Event | Location | Venue | Attendance | Main Event(s) |
|---|---|---|---|---|---|---|
| 1. | WWF | The Big Event; August 28, 1986 | Toronto, Ontario | Exhibition Stadium | 64,000 | Hulk Hogan (c) vs. Paul Orndorff for the WWF World Heavyweight Championship |
| 2. | WWF | Hulk Hogan vs. Don Muraco; August 18, 1986 | Montreal, Quebec | Montreal Forum | 21,700+ | Hulk Hogan (c) vs. Don Muraco for the WWF World Heavyweight Championship |
| 3. | Lutte / WWF | Lutte vs. WWF (First Show); August 26, 1985 | Montreal, Quebec | Montreal Forum | 21,500 | Dino Bravo and King Tonga vs. The Iron Sheik and Nikolai Volkoff |
| 4. | JCP / MLW | Night of the Champions; July 10, 1983 | Toronto, Ontario | CNE Stadium | 20,703 | Harley Race (c) vs. Ric Flair for the NWA World Heavyweight Championship |
| 5. | WWF | Randy Savage vs. Ricky Steamboat; January 9, 1987 | Montreal, Canada | Montreal Forum | 20,302 | Randy Savage (c) vs. Ricky Steamboat for the WWF Intercontinental Championship |
| 6. | Lutte / WWF | Lutte vs. WWF (Final Show); January 13, 1986 | Montreal, Quebec | Montreal Forum | 20,000 | Hulk Hogan (c) vs. Bob Orton Jr. for the WWF World Heavyweight Championship |
| 7. | Lutte | Rick Martel vs. Nick Bockwinkel; December 23, 1984 | Montreal, Quebec | Montreal Forum | 19,500 | Rick Martel (c) vs. Nick Bockwinkel for the AWA World Heavyweight Championship |
| 8. | WWF | Hulk Hogan vs. Big John Studd; July 14, 1985 | Toronto, Ontario | Maple Leaf Gardens | 18,000 | Hulk Hogan (c) vs. Big John Studd for the WWF World Heavyweight Championship |
| 8. | WWF | Dream Team vs. Dino Bravo & King Tonga; October 14, 1985 | Montreal, Quebec | Montreal Forum | 18,000 | Dream Team (Greg Valentine & Brutus Beefcake) (c) vs. Dino Bravo & King Tonga for the WWF World Tag Team Championship |
| 8. | WWF | Hulk Hogan vs. Kamala; December 28, 1986 | Toronto, Ontario | Maple Leaf Gardens | 18,000 | Hulk Hogan (c) vs. Kamala for the WWF World Heavyweight Championship |
| 8. | WWF | Frank Tunney Sr. Memorial Tournament; March 15, 1987 | Toronto, Ontario | Maple Leaf Gardens | 18,000 | 14-team tournament |
| 8. | WWF | Royal Rumble; January 24, 1988 | Hamilton, Ontario | Copps Coliseum | 18,000 | The Islanders (Haku and Tama) vs. The Young Stallions (Paul Roma and Jim Powers) in a Best 2-out-of-3 Falls match |
| 8. | WWF | Hulk Hogan & Bam Bam Bigelow vs. André the Giant & Ted DiBiase; March 14, 1988 | Montreal, Quebec | Montreal Forum | Hulk Hogan and Bam Bam Bigelow vs. André the Giant and Ted DiBiase | |
| 9. | WWF | André the Giant vs. King Kong Bundy; November 15, 1985 | Montreal, Quebec | Montreal Forum | 17,822 | André the Giant vs. King Kong Bundy |
| 10. | WWF | Hulk Hogan vs. Kamala; January 11, 1987 | Toronto, Ontario | Maple Leaf Gardens | 17,500 | Hulk Hogan (c) vs. Kamala in a Steel Cage match for the WWF World Heavyweight Championship |
| 10. | WWF | Hulk Hogan vs. Ted DiBiase; November 22, 1987 | Toronto, Ontario | Maple Leaf Gardens | 17,500 | Hulk Hogan (c) vs. Ted DiBiase for the WWF World Heavyweight Championship |
| 10. | WWF | Hulk Hogan & Bam Bam Bigelow vs. Ted DiBiase & King Kong Bundy; December 27, 1987 | Toronto, Ontario | Maple Leaf Gardens | 17,500 | Hulk Hogan and Bam Bam Bigelow vs. Ted DiBiase and King Kong Bundy |

Top 10 most-attended shows in the 1990s
| No. | Promotion | Event | Location | Venue | Attendance | Main Event(s) |
|---|---|---|---|---|---|---|
| 1. | WWF | WrestleMania VI; April 1, 1990 | Toronto, Ontario | SkyDome | 64,287 | Hulk Hogan (WHC) vs. The Ultimate Warrior (IC) in a Champion vs. Champion match for the WWF World Heavyweight and WWF Intercontinental Championships |
| 2. | WWF | WWF Raw; February 8, 1999 | Toronto, Ontario | SkyDome | 41,432 | Steve Austin vs. Vince McMahon, Ken Shamrock, Test, Kane, Chyna and Big Boss Man in a handicap elimination match |
| 3. | WWF | WWF Raw (Ep. 195); January 31, 1997 | Toronto, Ontario | SkyDome | 25,628 | The Undertaker and Ahmed Johnson vs. Mankind and Faarooq in a No Holds Barred match |
| 4. | WWF | WWF Xperience; August 24, 1996 | Toronto, Ontario | CNE Stadium | 21,211 | Shawn Michaels (c) vs. Goldust in a ladder match for the WWF World Heavyweight Championship |
| 5. | WWF | Survivor Series; November 9, 1997 | Montreal, Quebec | Molson Centre | 20,593 | Bret Hart (c) vs. Shawn Michaels for the WWF World Heavyweight Championship |
| 6. | WWF | WWF Live in Toronto; November 20, 1999 | Toronto, Ontario | SkyDome | 18,624 | The Rock vs. Big Boss Man |
| 7. | WWF | In Your House: Rock Bottom; December 13, 1998 | Vancouver, British Columbia | General Motors Place | 17,677 | Steve Austin vs. The Undertaker in a Buried Alive match |
| 7. | WWF | WWF Sunday Night HEAT (Ep. 20); December 13, 1998 | Vancouver, British Columbia | General Motors Place | 17,677 | The New Age Outlaws (Road Dogg and Billy Gunn) vs. Hell's Henchmen (Faarooq and Bradshaw) |
| 8. | WWF | In Your House: Breakdown; September 27, 1998 | Hamilton, Ontario | Copps Coliseum | 17,405 | Steve Austin (c) vs. The Undertaker vs. Kane in a Triple Threat match for the WWF Championship |
| 8. | WWF | WWF Sunday Night HEAT (Ep. 9); September 27, 1998 | Hamilton, Ontario | Copps Coliseum | 17,405 | Billy Gunn vs. Skull vs. 8-Ball in a Triple Threat match |
| 9. | WWF | WWF Live in Toronto; April 23, 1999 | Toronto, Ontario | SkyDome | 17,402 | Steve Austin and Big Show vs. The Rock and Triple H |
| 10. | WWF | WWF Live in Edmonton; April 18, 1999 | Edmonton, Alberta | Skyreach Centre | 16,874 | Steve Austin and Big Show vs. The Rock and Big Boss Man |

Top 10 most-attended shows in the 2000s
| No. | Promotion | Event | Location | Venue | Attendance | Main Event(s) |
|---|---|---|---|---|---|---|
| 1. | WWF | WrestleMania X8; March 17, 2002 | Toronto, Ontario | SkyDome | 68,237 | Chris Jericho (c) vs. Triple H for the WWE Undisputed Championship |
| 2. | WWE | SummerSlam; August 15, 2004 | Toronto, Ontario | Air Canada Centre | 17,640 | Chris Benoit (c) vs. Randy Orton for the World Heavyweight Championship |
| 3. | WWE | WWE RAW (Ep. 813); December 22, 2008 | Toronto, Ontario | Air Canada Centre | 17,122 | John Cena (c) vs. Chris Jericho for the WWE World Heavyweight Championship |
| 4. | WWE | WWE RAW (Ep. 780); May 5, 2008 | Toronto, Ontario | Air Canada Centre | 16,664 | Mr. Kennedy and Triple H vs. Tommy Dreamer, Kane, Matt Striker, Shelton Benjamin, Kofi Kingston, Stevie Richards, Nunzio, Mike Knox, Elijah Burke, CM Punk, Chavo Guerrero Jr., The Miz and John Morrison in a 14-on-2 Handicap match |
| 5. | WWE | Unforgiven; September 17, 2006 | Toronto, Ontario | Air Canada Centre | 16,105 | Edge (c) vs. John Cena in a Tables, Ladders, and Chairs match for the WWE Championship |
| 6. | WWF | WWF Live in Toronto; March 17, 2001 | Toronto, Ontario | SkyDome | 15,313 | Steve Austin, The Undertaker and Kane vs. William Regal, Big Show and Triple H |
| 7. | WWE | No Way Out; February 23, 2003 | Montreal, Quebec | Bell Centre | 15,100 | The Rock vs. Hulk Hogan |
| 8. | WWF | WWF RAW is WAR (Ep. 432); September 3, 2001 | Toronto, Ontario | Air Canada Centre | 14,890 | Chris Jericho and Jeff Hardy vs. The Alliance (Rob Van Dam and Rhyno) |
| 9. | WWF | WWF Live in Edmonton; May 28, 2000 | Edmonton, Alberta | Skyreach Centre | 14,500 | Chris Benoit (c) vs. Chris Jericho for the WWF Intercontinental Championship |
| 10. | WWE | Backlash; April 18, 2004 | Edmonton, Alberta | Rexall Place | 13,000 | Chris Benoit (c) vs. Shawn Michaels vs. Triple H in a Triple Threat match for the World Heavyweight Championship |

Top 10 most-attended shows in the 2010s
| No. | Promotion | Event | Location | Venue | Attendance | Main Event(s) |
|---|---|---|---|---|---|---|
| 1. | WWE | Survivor Series; November 20, 2016 | Toronto, Ontario | Air Canada Centre | 17,143 | Goldberg vs. Brock Lesnar |
| 2. | WWE | SummerSlam; August 11, 2019 | Toronto, Ontario | Scotiabank Arena | 16,904 | Brock Lesnar (c) vs. Seth Rollins for the WWE Universal Championship |
| 3. | WWE | WWE NXT TakeOver: Toronto; August 10, 2019 | Toronto, Ontario | Scotiabank Arena | 13,745 | Adam Cole (c) vs. Johnny Gargano in a Best 2-out-of-3 Falls match for the NXT Championship |
| 4. | WWE | WWE RAW (Ep. 1226); November 21, 2016 | Toronto, Ontario | Air Canada Centre | 13,500 | Kevin Owens (c) vs. Seth Rollins in a No Disqualification match for the WWE Universal Championship |
| 5. | WWE | WWE NXT TakeOver: Toronto; November 19, 2016 | Toronto, Ontario | Air Canada Centre | 12,649 | Shinsuke Nakamura (c) vs. Samoa Joe for the NXT Championship |
| 6. | WWE | WWE RAW (Ep. 886); May 17, 2010 | Toronto, Ontario | Air Canada Centre | 11,000 | John Cena (c) vs. Sheamus in a non-title match for the WWE World Championship |
| 7. | WWE | WWE RAW (Ep. 1145); May 4, 2015 | Montreal, Quebec | Centre Bell | 10,811 | Randy Orton vs. Roman Reigns |
| 8. | WWE | WWE RAW (Ep. 1102); July 7, 2014 | Montreal, Quebec | Centre Bell | 10,500 | John Cena vs. Seth Rollins |
| 9. | WWE | WWE RAW; March 1, 2013 | Toronto, Ontario | Ricoh Coliseum | 9,500 | John Cena and Ryback vs. The Shield (Dean Ambrose and Seth Rollins) |
| 10. | WWE | WWE SmackDown (Ep. 628); August 23, 2011 | Calgary, Alberta | Scotiabank Saddledome | 9,000 | Sheamus vs. Mark Henry |
| 10. | WWE | WWE Live in Toronto; December 30, 2015 | Toronto, Ontario | Ricoh Coliseum | 9,000 | Alberto del Río (c) vs. John Cena for the WWE United States Championship |
| 10. | WWE | Roadblock; March 12, 2016 | Toronto, Ontario | Ricoh Coliseum | 9,000 | Triple H (c) vs. Dean Ambrose for the WWE World Heavyweight Championship |
