= List of World Championship Wrestling attendance records =

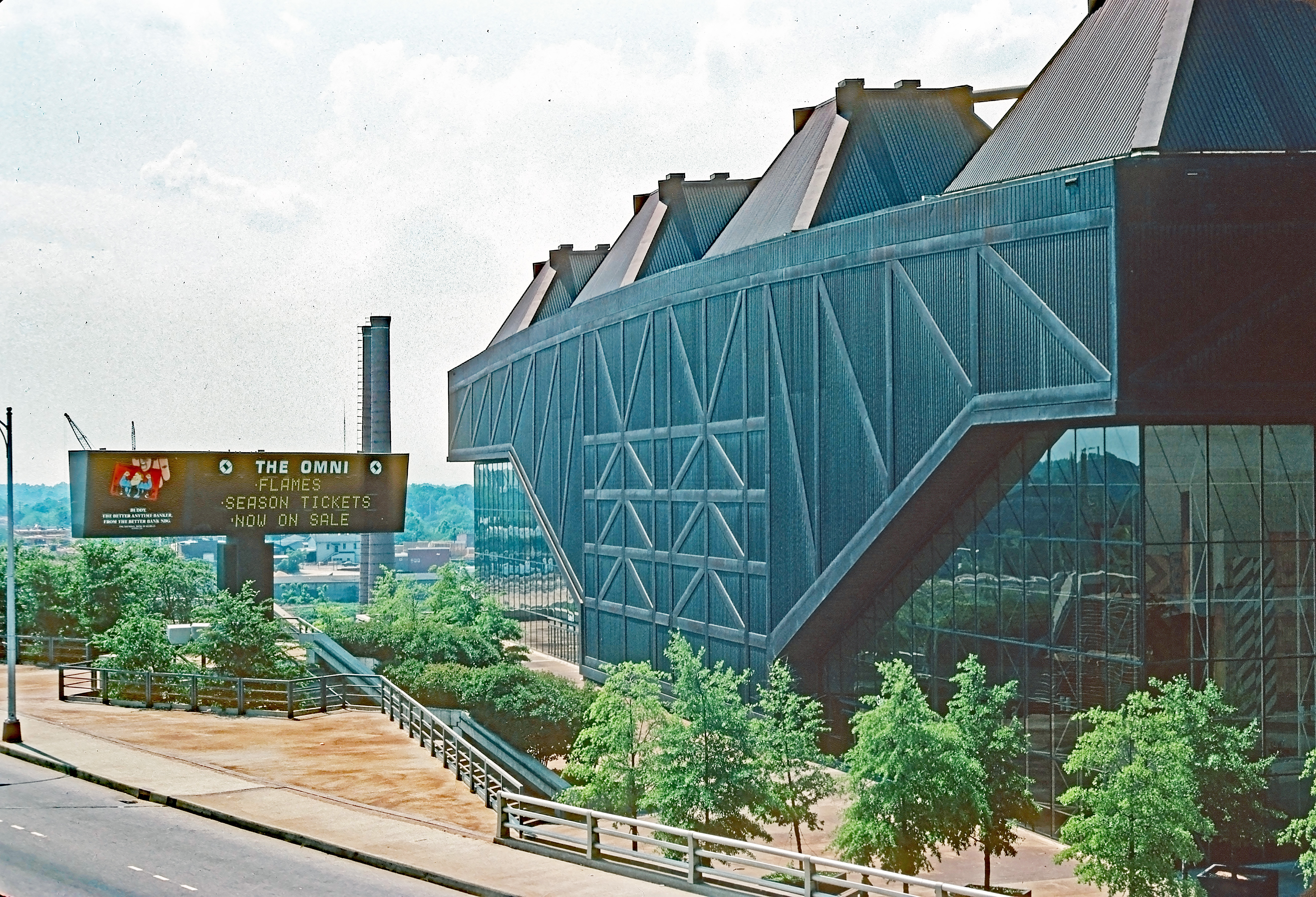
The Omni, one of the most popular wrestling venues in Southeastern U.S. during the "Territory-era", set a number of attendance records in the 1980s and 1990s. Arn Anderson has called The Omni the equivalent of Madison Square Garden for Southern wrestling fans.

The following is a list of World Championship Wrestling attendance records. Founded as Jim Crockett Promotions (JCP) in 1931, it was one of the first professional wrestling promotions in the United States. Upon joining the National Wrestling Alliance (NWA) in 1951, the Crockett family controlled the NWA's "Mid-Atlantic wrestling territory" which included the Carolinas and Virginia, and was long regarded as one of the organization's most powerful members. Jim Crockett Jr. became the face of the NWA as he battled Vince McMahon's World Wrestling Federation (WWF) during the 1980s wrestling boom but was ultimately forced into bankruptcy.

After the sale of JCP to Ted Turner in 1988, the company was rebranded as World Championship Wrestling (WCW). For the next six years, WCW saw record-low attendances under the management of Turner executive Jim Herd. In 1995, WCW experienced a resurgence under Eric Bischoff following the creation of WCW Monday Nitro, debut of The Outsiders and "heel turn" of Hulk Hogan, and subsequent formation of the New World Order. A new rivalry with the WWF, known as the "Monday Night War", was a major force driving the 1990s wrestling boom. WCW's pay-per-view events and Nitro's live television episodes during this period would surpass almost all of the previous records set by JCP during the 1970s and 80s. Outside the U.S., WCW partnered with New Japan Pro-Wrestling (NJPW) to promote the Japan Supershows (also known as Starrcade in Tokyo Dome) between 1991 and 1994, which set a number of attendance records in Japan. In 1995, both companies co-hosted the two-day Collision in Korea pay-per-view (PPV) event at May Day Stadium in Pyongyang, North Korea. With a combined crowd of 355,000, it is the highest attended wrestling event of all-time.

The list is dominated by WCW's flagship Monday Nitro television program, which aired from various arenas and locations across the world during its 5-year run. Only seven of the attendances listed are exclusively WCW/JCP events, with JCP's Great American Bash '85, Great American Bash '86 and Great American Bash '87 being the only house show events on the list. All but four of the events included have been held in the United States where WCW was based, while three have been held in Japan and one in the North Korea.

== Events and attendances ==
Promotion	Event	Location	Venue	Attendance	Main Event(s)
NJPW / WCW	Collision in Korea (Day 2); April 29, 1995	Pyongyang, North Korea	May Day Stadium	355,000 (combined)	Antonio Inoki vs. Ric Flair
NJPW / WCW	Collision in Korea (Day 1); April 28, 1995	Pyongyang, North Korea	May Day Stadium	355,000 (combined)	Shinya Hashimoto (c) vs. Scott Norton for the IWGP Heavyweight Championship
NJPW / WCW	Starrcade in Tokyo Dome; March 21, 1991	Tokyo, Japan	Tokyo Dome	64,500	Tatsumi Fujinami (c - NJPW) vs. Ric Flair (c - NWA) in a Champion vs. Champion match for the IWGP Heavyweight Championship and NWA World Heavyweight Championships
NJPW / WCW	Starrcade in Tokyo Dome; January 4, 1992	Tokyo, Japan	Tokyo Dome	60,000	Sting (WCW) and The Great Muta (NJPW) vs. The Steiner Brothers (Rick Steiner and Scott Steiner)
NJPW / WCW	Wrestling Dontaku in Fukuoka Dome; May 1, 1994	Fukuoka, Japan	Fukuoka Dome	53,000	Antonio Inoki vs. The Great Muta
WCW	WCW Monday Nitro (Ep. 147); July 6, 1998	Atlanta, Georgia	Georgia Dome	41,412	Hollywood Hogan (c) vs. Bill Goldberg for the WCW World Heavyweight Championship
WCW	WCW Monday Nitro (Ep. 173); January 4, 1999	Atlanta, Georgia	Georgia Dome	38,809	Hollywood Hogan vs. Kevin Nash (c) for the WCW World Heavyweight Championship
WCW	WCW Monday Nitro (Ep. 169); December 7, 1998	Houston, Texas	Reliant Astrodome	32,067	Bill Goldberg (c) vs. Bam Bam Bigelow for the WCW World Heavyweight Championship
WCW	WCW Monday Nitro (Ep. 171); December 21, 1998	St. Louis, Missouri	Trans World Dome	29,000	Bill Goldberg (c) vs. Scott Hall for the WCW World Heavyweight Championship
JCP	Great American Bash; July 6, 1985	Charlotte, North Carolina	American Legion Memorial Stadium	27,000	Ric Flair (c) vs. Nikita Koloff for the NWA World Heavyweight Championship with David Crockett as special referee
WCW	WCW Monday Nitro (Ep. 121); January 5, 1998	Atlanta, Georgia	Georgia Dome	26,773	Lex Luger vs. Randy Savage
JCP	Great American Bash (Day 20); July 18, 1987	Charlotte, North Carolina	American Legion Memorial Stadium	25,000	Ric Flair (c) vs. Road Warrior Hawk for the NWA World Heavyweight Championship
JCP	Great American Bash (Day 4); July 5, 1986	Charlotte, North Carolina	American Legion Memorial Stadium	23,000	Ric Flair (c) vs. Ricky Morton in a steel cage match for the NWA World Heavyweight Championship
WCW	WCW Monday Nitro (Ep. 91); June 9, 1997	Boston, Massachusetts	FleetCenter	22,000	The Outsiders (Scott Hall and Kevin Nash) (c) vs. Ric Flair and Roddy Piper for the WCW World Tag Team Championship
WCW	Slamboree; May 9, 1999	St. Louis, Missouri	TWA Dome	20,510	Diamond Dallas Page (c) vs. Kevin Nash for the WCW World Heavyweight Championship

== Historical ==
Top 10 most-attended shows in the 1930s
No.	Promotion	Event	Location	Venue	Attendance	Main Event(s)
1.	JCP	Ed Lewis vs. Mayes McLain; February 11, 1935	Charlotte, North Carolina	Charlotte Armory Auditorium	5,000	Ed "Strangler" Lewis vs. Mayes McLain in a Best 2-out-of-3 Falls match
2.	JCP	Dick Shikat vs. Jim Henry; October 26, 1934	Charlotte, North Carolina	Charlotte Armory Auditorium	4,500	Dick Shikat vs. Jim Henry in a Best 2-out-of-3 Falls match
3.	JCP	Cowboy Luttrall vs. Jim Henry; January 14, 1935	Charlotte, North Carolina	Charlotte Armory Auditorium	4,000	Cowboy Luttrall vs. Jim Henry in a Best 2-out-of-3 Falls match
3.	JCP	Tiny Roebuck vs. Tor Johnson; April 15, 1935	Charlotte, North Carolina	Charlotte Armory Auditorium	4,000	Tiny Roebuck vs. Tor Johnson in a Best 2-out-of-3 Falls match
3.	JCP	Jim Browning vs. John Katan; January 17, 1936	Richmond, Virginia	City Auditorium	4,000	Jim Browning vs. John Katan in a Best 2-out-of-3 Falls match
3.	JCP	Dr. Len Hall vs. John Katan; January 31, 1936	Richmond, Virginia	City Auditorium	4,000	Dr. Len Hall vs. John Katan in a Best 2-out-of-3 Falls match
3.	JCP	Dr. Len Hall vs. Ernie Dusek; February 14, 1936	Richmond, Virginia	City Auditorium	4,000	Dr. Len Hall vs. Ernie Dusek in a Best 2-out-of-3 Falls match
3.	JCP	Dr. Len Hall vs. Gus Sonnenberg; May 29, 1936	Richmond, Virginia	City Auditorium	4,000	Dr. Len Hall vs. Gus Sonnenberg in a Best 2-out-of-3 Falls match
4.	JCP	Cowboy Luttrall vs. Eli Fischer; March 4, 1935	Charlotte, North Carolina	Charlotte Armory Auditorium	3,500	Cowboy Luttrall vs. Eli Fischer in a Best 2-out-of-3 Falls match
4.	JCP	Cowboy Luttrall vs. Tiny Roebuck; March 18, 1935	Charlotte, North Carolina	Charlotte Armory Auditorium	3,500	Cowboy Luttrall vs. Tiny Roebuck in a Best 2-out-of-3 Falls match
5.	JCP	Jim Henry vs. Ivan Vakturoff; September 24, 1934	Charlotte, North Carolina	Charlotte Armory Auditorium	3,000	Jim Henry vs. Ivan Vakturoff in a Best 2-out-of-3 Falls match
5.	JCP	Jim Henry vs. Marshall Blackstock; November 23, 1934	Charlotte, North Carolina	Charlotte Armory Auditorium	3,000	Jim Henry vs. Marshall Blackstock in a Best 2-out-of-3 Falls match
5.	JCP	Gus Sonnenberg vs. Little Beaver; July 19, 1935	Richmond, Virginia	Richmond Stadium	3,000	Gus Sonnenberg vs. Little Beaver in a Best 2-out-of-3 Falls match
5.	JCP	Scotty Dawkins vs. Cy Williams; June 25, 1936	Bristol, Tennessee	Cumberland Arena	3,000	Scotty Dawkins vs. Cy Williams in a Best 2-out-of-3 Falls match
5.	JCP	Ernie Dusek vs. George Koverly; July 10, 1936	Richmond, Virginia	Richmond Stadium	3,000	Ernie Dusek vs. George Koverly
5.	JCP	Ernie Dusek vs. Jim Coffield; March 11, 1938	Richmond, Virginia	City Auditorium	3,000	Ernie Dusek vs. Jim Coffield in a Best 2-out-of-3 Falls match
5.	JCP	Jim Londos vs. Chief Little Beaver; December 6, 1939	Norfolk, Virginia	City Auditorium	3,000	Jim Londos (c) vs. Chief Little Beaver for the World Heavyweight Championship
6.	JCP	Cowboy Luttrall vs. Gus Sonnenberg; September 2, 1935	Charlotte, North Carolina	Charlotte Armory Auditorium	2,800	Cowboy Luttrall vs. Gus Sonnenberg in a Best 2-out-of-3 Falls match
7.	JCP	Jim Henry vs Willie Middlekauff; September 10, 1934	Charlotte, North Carolina	Charlotte Armory Auditorium	2,500	Jim Henry vs Bill Middlekauff in a Best 2-out-of-3 Falls match with special referee Jess Willard
7.	JCP	Gus Sonnenberg vs. Bull Martin; August 30, 1935	Richmond, Virginia	Richmond Auditorium	2,500	Gus Sonnenberg vs. Bull Martin
7.	JCP	Ernie Dusek vs. Len Hall; March 20, 1936	Richmond, Virginia	Richmond Auditorium	2,500	Ernie Dusek vs. Len Hall
8.	JCP	George Widchecki vs. Andy Mantell; November 1, 1934	Charlotte, North Carolina	Charlotte Armory Auditorium	2,000	George Widchecki vs. Andy Mantell
8.	JCP	Gus Sonnenberg vs. Herbie Freeman; September 4, 1935	Greensboro, North Carolina	Sportrena	2,000	Gus Sonnenberg vs. Herbie Freeman in a Best 2-out-of-3 Falls match
8.	JCP	Cliff Olsen vs. Ernie Dusek; December 3, 1937	Richmond, Virginia	Richmond Auditorium	2,000	Cliff Olsen vs. Ernie Dusek
8.	JCP	Ernie Dusek vs. Cliff Olson; April 1, 1938	Richmond, Virginia	Richmond Auditorium	2,000	Ernie Dusek vs. Cliff Olson in a Best 2-out-of-3 Falls match
8.	JCP	Roland Kirchmeyer vs. Pat McClary; January 26, 1938	Norfolk, Virginia	Norfolk Auditorium	2,000	Roland Kirchmeyer vs. Pat McClary in a Best 2-out-of-3 Falls match
8.	JCP	Ernie Dusek vs. Cliff Olson; February 4, 1938	Richmond, Virginia	Richmond Auditorium	2,000	Ernie Dusek vs. Cliff Olson in a Best 2-out-of-3 Falls match
8.	JCP	Ernie Dusek vs. Jim Clintstock; July 8, 1938	Richmond, Virginia	Richmond Stadium	2,000	Ernie Dusek vs. Jim Clintstock in a Best 2-out-of-3 Falls match
8.	JCP	Dick Shikat vs. Roy Graham; October 20, 1938	Raleigh, North Carolina	Memorial Auditorium	2,000	Dick Shikat vs. Roy Graham
8.	JCP	Gus Sonnenberg vs. Cowboy Luttrall; December 13, 1939	Richmond, Virginia	Richmond Auditorium	2,000	Gus Sonnenberg vs. Cowboy Luttrall in a Best 2-out-of-3 Falls match
8.	JCP	Gus Sonnenberg vs. Jack Hader; December 15, 1939	Richmond, Virginia	Richmond Auditorium	2,000	Gus Sonnenberg vs. Jack Hader
9.	JCP	Jim Browning vs. Henry Graber; January 15, 1936	Greensboro, North Carolina	Sportrena	1,800	Jim Browning vs. Henry Graber in a Best 2-out-of-3 Falls match
9.	JCP	Ernie Dusek vs. Mike Mazurki; March 13, 1936	Richmond, Virginia	Richmond Auditorium	1,800	Ernie Dusek vs. Mike Mazurki
9.	JCP	Ghafoor Khan vs. Dick Lever; March 29, 1938	Columbia, South Carolina	Township Auditorium	1,800	Ghafoor Khan vs. Dick Lever in a Mud match
10.	JCP	Everett Marshall vs. Emil Dusek; September 7, 1934	Richmond, Virginia	Richmond Auditorium	1,500	Everett Marshall vs. Emil Dusek in a Best 2-out-of-3 Falls match
10.	JCP	Dick Shikat vs. Tiny Roebuck; June 3, 1935	Charlotte, North Carolina	Charlotte Armory Auditorium	1,500	Dick Shikat vs. Tiny Roebuck in a Best 2-out-of-3 Falls match
10.	JCP	Roland Kirchmeyer vs. Legs Langevin; February 2, 1938	Norfolk, Virginia	Norfolk Auditorium	1,500	Roland Kirchmeyer vs. Legs Langevin in a Best 2-out-of-3 Falls match
10.	JCP	Leo Savage vs. Dobie Osborne; July 28, 1938	Raleigh, North Carolina	Memorial Auditorium	1,500	Leo "Daniel Boone" Savage vs. Dobie Osborne in a Best 2-out-of-3 Falls match
10.	JCP	Casey Berger vs. Pete Peterson; August 18, 1938	Raleigh, North Carolina	Memorial Auditorium	1,500	Casey Berger vs. Pete Peterson in a Best 2-out-of-3 Falls match

Top 5 most-attended shows in the 1940s
No.	Promotion	Event	Location	Venue	Attendance	Main Event(s)
1.	JCP	The French Angel vs. Jack O'Brian; September 5, 1946	Richmond, Virginia	Richmond Stadium	3,800	The French Angel vs. Jack O'Brian
2.	JCP	The French Angel vs. Bob McCoy; October 4, 1940	Richmond, Virginia	Richmond Stadium	3,500	The French Angel vs. Bob McCoy
2.	JCP	The French Angel vs. Ben Morgan; September 23, 1940	Charlotte, North Carolina	American Legion Memorial Stadium	3,500	The French Angel vs. Ben Morgan
2.	JCP	Johnny Long vs. Marvin Hutchins; June 3, 1946	Charlotte, North Carolina	Charlotte Armory Auditorium	3,500	Johnny Long vs. Marvin Hutchins in a Boxing match
2.	JCP	Frank Sexton vs. Kola Kwariani; July 18, 1946	Richmond, Virginia	Richmond Stadium	3,500	Frank Sexton (c) vs. Kola Kwariani in a Best 2-out-of-3 Falls match for the AWA World Heavyweight Championship
3.	JCP	The French Angel vs. Gus Sonnenberg; October 2, 1940	Norfolk, Virginia	Norfolk Auditorium	3,000	The French Angel vs. Gus Sonnenberg in a Best 2-out-of-3 Falls match
3.	JCP	Jim Londos vs. Joe Savoldi; March 27, 1940	Norfolk, Virginia	Norfolk Auditorium	3,000	Jim Londos (c) vs. Joe Savoldi in a Best 2-out-of-3 Falls match for the World Heavyweight Championship
3.	JCP	Jim Coffield & Johnny Long vs. Earl Wampler & Jack O'Brien; April 29, 1946	Charlotte, North Carolina	Charlotte Armory Auditorium	3,000	Jim Coffield and Johnny Long vs. Earl Wampler and Jack O'Brien with special referee Tony Galento
3.	JCP	Primo Carnera vs. Wladyslaw Talun; August 7, 1947	Richmond, Virginia	Richmond Stadium	3,000	Primo Carnera vs. Wladyslaw Talun in a Best 2-out-of-3 Falls match
3.	JCP	Ray Villmer vs. LaVerne Baxter; June 28, 1948	Charlotte, North Carolina	Charlotte Armory Auditorium	3,000	Ray Villmer vs. LaVerne Baxter
4.	JCP	The French Angel Tournament; June 16, 1940	Charlotte, North Carolina	American Legion Memorial Stadium	2,500	11-man round robin tournament
4.	JCP	The French Angel vs. Sam Menacker; September 25, 1940	Charleston, South Carolina	College of Charleston Gym	2,500	The French Angel vs. Sam Menacker in a Best 2-out-of-3 Falls match
4.	JCP	Frank Sexton vs. Joe Savoldi; August 29, 1946	Richmond, Virginia	Richmond Stadium	2,500	Frank Sexton (c) vs. Joe Savoldi in a Best 2-out-of-3 Falls match for the AWA World Heavyweight Championship
5.	JCP	6-Man Battle Royal; June 17, 1946	Charlotte, North Carolina	Charlotte Armory Auditorium	2,000	6-man Battle Royal

Top 10 most-attended shows in the 1950s
No.	Promotion	Event	Location	Venue	Attendance	Main Event(s)
1.	JCP	Great Bolo vs. Larry Hamilton; January 26, 1959	Charlotte, North Carolina	Charlotte Coliseum	11,807	The Great Bolo vs. Larry Hamilton in a Texas Death match
2.	JCP	Great Bolo vs. Mike Clancy; November 17, 1958	Charlotte, North Carolina	Park Center	11,704	The Great Bolo vs. Mike Clancy in a Grudge match
3.	JCP	Great Bolo vs. Mike Clancy; December 8, 1958	Charlotte, North Carolina	Charlotte Coliseum	10,777	The Great Bolo vs. Mike Clancy
4.	JCP	Great Bolo vs. George Becker; April 21, 1958	Charlotte, North Carolina	Charlotte Coliseum	10,693	The Great Bolo vs. George Becker in a Best 2-out-of-3 Falls match
5.	JCP	Great Bolo vs. Ernie Dusek; September 15, 1958	Charlotte, North Carolina	Charlotte Coliseum	9,812	The Great Bolo vs. Ernie Dusek in a Loser Leaves Town match
6.	JCP	Great Bolo vs. Danny McShain; April 6, 1959	Charlotte, North Carolina	Charlotte Coliseum	9,700	The Great Bolo vs. Danny McShain
7.	JCP	Great Bolo vs. Argentina Rocca; June 16, 1958	Charlotte, North Carolina	Charlotte Coliseum	9,241	The Great Bolo vs. Argentina Rocca with special referee George Becker
8.	JCP	Mr. Moto & Duke Keomuka vs. The Great Bolo & Larry Hamilton; August 3, 1959	Charlotte, North Carolina	American Legion Memorial Stadium	7,722	Mr. Moto and Duke Keomuka (c) vs. The Great Bolo and Larry Hamilton for the NWA Southern Tag Team Championship
9.	JCP	Great Bolo & Larry Hamilton vs. George Becker & Enrique Torres; November 9, 1959	Charlotte, North Carolina	Charlotte Coliseum	6,919	The Great Bolo & Larry Hamilton vs. George Becker & Enrique Torres in a Texas Death match
10.	JCP	Mr. Moto vs. Chuck Wiggins; April 20, 1951	Richmond, Virginia	Atlantic Rural Exposition	5,600	Mr. Moto vs. Chuck Wiggins

Top 10 most-attended shows in the 1960s
No.	Promotion	Event	Location	Venue	Attendance	Main Event(s)
1.	JCP	Dory Funk Jr. vs. Lee Henning; February 24, 1969	Charlotte, North Carolina	Charlotte Coliseum	11,397	Dory Funk Jr. (c) vs. Lee Henning for the NWA World Heavyweight Championship
2.	JCP	The Bolos vs. The Kentuckians; February 18, 1963	Charlotte, North Carolina	Charlotte Coliseum	11,000	The Bolos (The Great Bolo & The Mighty Bolo) vs. The Kentuckians (Big Boy Brown & Tiny Anderson)
3.	JCP	Buddy Rogers vs. The Brute; January 30, 1961	Charlotte, North Carolina	Charlotte Coliseum	10,644	Buddy Rogers vs. The Brute in a Best 2-out-of-3 Falls match
4.	JCP	Great Bolo & Larry Hamilton vs. Paul Anderson & Haystack Calhoun; January 18, 1960	Charlotte, North Carolina	Charlotte Coliseum	9,982	The Great Bolo and Larry Hamilton (c) vs. Paul Anderson and Haystack Calhoun in a No Disqualification "Winner Takes All" match for the NWA Southern Tag Team Championship
5.	JCP	Gene Kiniski vs. Johnny Weaver; November 23, 1967	Greensboro, North Carolina	Greensboro Coliseum	9,017	Gene Kiniski (c) vs. Johnny Weaver in a Best 2-out-of-3 Falls match for the NWA World Heavyweight Championship
6.	JCP	Art Thomas, George Becker & Johnny Weaver vs. George Harris, Aldo Bogni & Bronko Lubich; December 26, 1968	Winston-Salem, North Carolina	Lawrence Joel Veterans Memorial Coliseum	9,000	Art Thomas, George Becker and Johnny Weaver vs. George Harris, Aldo Bogni and Bronko Lubich in a Best 2-out-of-3 Falls match
7.	JCP	The Kentuckians vs. Aldo Bogni & Bronko Lubich; July 15, 1965	Winston-Salem, North Carolina	Lawrence Joel Veterans Memorial Coliseum	8,800	The Kentuckians (Big Boy Brown & Tiny Anderson) vs. Aldo Bogni & Bronko Lubich in a Best 2-out-of-3 Falls match
8.	JCP	Aldo Bogni & Bronko Lubich vs. George Becker & Johnny Weaver; July 3, 1965	Greensboro, North Carolina	Greensboro Coliseum	8,706	Aldo Bogni and Bronko Lubich (c) vs. George Becker and Johnny Weaver in a Best 2-out-of-3 Falls match for the NWA Southern Tag Team Championship
9.	JCP	Johnny Weaver & Haystacks Calhoun vs. The Bolos; July 2, 1964	Greensboro, North Carolina	Greensboro Coliseum	8,442	Johnny Weaver & Haystacks Calhoun vs. The Bolos (The Great Bolo & The Mighty Bolo)
10.	JCP	George Becker & Johnny Weaver vs. The Minnesota Wrecking Crew; November 28, 1968	Greensboro, North Carolina	Greensboro Coliseum	8,417	George Becker and Johnny Weaver (c) vs. The Minnesota Wrecking Crew (Gene Anderson and Ole Anderson) in a Best 2-out-of-3 Falls match for the NWA Southern Tag Team Championship with special referee Joe Louis

Top 10 most-attended shows in the 1970s
No.	Promotion	Event	Location	Venue	Attendance	Main Event(s)
1.	MACW	NWA United States Heavyweight Championship Tournament; November 9, 1975	Greensboro, North Carolina	Greensboro Coliseum	15,076	16-man tournament for the vacant NWA United States Heavyweight Championship
2.	MACW	Dory Funk & Dory Funk Jr. vs. The Brisco Brothers; November 23, 1972	Greensboro, North Carolina	Greensboro Coliseum	13,000	Dory Funk and Dory Funk Jr. vs. The Brisco Brothers (Jack Brisco and Jerry Brisco)
3.	MACW	Jack Brisco vs. Wahoo McDaniel; November 27, 1975	Greensboro, North Carolina	Greensboro Coliseum	12,102	Jack Brisco (c) vs. Wahoo McDaniel in a No Disqualification match for the NWA World Heavyweight Championship
4.	MACW	Harley Race vs. Dick Murdoch; July 2, 1978	Greensboro, North Carolina	Greensboro Coliseum	11,267	Harley Race (c) vs. Dick Murdoch for the NWA World Heavyweight Championship
5.	MACW	Paul Jones vs. Angelo Mosca; January 31, 1976	Greensboro, North Carolina	Greensboro Coliseum	11,187	Paul Jones (c) vs. Angelo Mosca for the NWA United States Heavyweight Championship
6.	MACW	22-Man Battle Royal; November 25, 1976	Greensboro, North Carolina	Greensboro Coliseum	11,063	22-man Battle Royal
7.	JCP	George Becker & Johnny Weaver vs. The Blond Bombers; March 27, 1971	Hampton, Virginia	Hampton Roads Coliseum	11,000	George Becker and Johnny Weaver vs. The Blond Bombers (Rip Hawk and Swede Hanson)
8.	MACW	Harley Race vs. Johnny Valentine; July 3, 1975	Greensboro, North Carolina	Greensboro Coliseum	10,000	Harley Race (c) vs. Johnny Valentine for the NWA United States Heavyweight Championship
9.	MACW	Minnesota Wrecking Crew vs. Ric Flair & Greg Valentine; October 30, 1977	Greensboro, North Carolina	Greensboro Coliseum	9,723	The Minnesota Wrecking Crew (Gene Anderson and Ole Anderson) (c) vs. Ric Flair & Greg Valentine in a Hair vs. Title match for the NWA World Tag Team Championship
10.	MACW	Minnesota Wrecking Crew vs. Paul Jones & Dusty Rhodes; September 28, 1975	Greensboro, North Carolina	Greensboro Coliseum	9,600	The Minnesota Wrecking Crew (Gene Anderson and Ole Anderson) (c) vs. Paul Jones and Dusty Rhodes for the NWA World Tag Team Championship

Top 10 most-attended shows in the 1980s
No.	Promotion	Event	Location	Venue	Attendance	Main Event(s)
1.	JCP	Great American Bash; July 6, 1985	Charlotte, North Carolina	American Legion Memorial Stadium	27,000	Ric Flair (c) vs. Nikita Koloff for the NWA World Heavyweight Championship with David Crockett as special referee
2.	JCP	Great American Bash (Day 20); July 18, 1987	Charlotte, North Carolina	American Legion Memorial Stadium	25,000	Ric Flair (c) vs. Road Warrior Hawk for the NWA World Heavyweight Championship
3.	JCP	Great American Bash (Day 4); July 5, 1986	Charlotte, North Carolina	American Legion Memorial Stadium	23,000	Ric Flair (c) vs. Ricky Morton in a steel cage match for the NWA World Heavyweight Championship
4.	JCP	Bunkhouse Stampede; February 27, 1987	Pittsburgh, Pennsylvania	Civic Arena	16,600+	Dusty Rhodes defeated Big Bubba in a Steel Cage match
5.	JCP	Ric Flair vs. Sting; January 31, 1988	Atlanta, Georgia	The Omni	16,002	Ric Flair (c) vs. Sting for the NWA World Heavyweight Championship
6.	MACW	Starrcade '84: The Million Dollar Challenge; November 22, 1984	Greensboro, North Carolina	Greensboro Coliseum	16,000	Ric Flair (c) vs. Dusty Rhodes for the NWA World Heavyweight Championship with special guest referee Joe Frazier
6.	JCP	Starrcade '86: The Skywalkers; November 27, 1986	Greensboro, North Carolina	Greensboro Coliseum	16,000	Ric Flair (c-WC) vs. Nikita Koloff (c-US) in a Champion vs. Champion match for the NWA World Heavyweight Championship and NWA United States Championship
6.	JCP	Great American Bash (Day 31); July 31, 1987	Miami, Florida	Orange Bowl	16,000	Dusty Rhodes, Nikita Koloff, The Road Warriors (Road Warrior Hawk and Road Warrior Animal) and Paul Ellering vs. The Four Horsemen (Ric Flair, Arn Anderson, Lex Luger, and Tully Blanchard) and The War Machine in a WarGames match
7.	WCW	Ric Flair vs. Terry Funk; September 3, 1989	Atlanta, Georgia	The Omni	15,500	Ric Flair (c) vs. Terry Funk in a Texas Death match for the NWA World Heavyweight Championship
8.	MACW	Starrcade '83: A Flare for the Gold; November 24, 1983	Greensboro, North Carolina	Greensboro Coliseum	15,447	Harley Race (c) vs. Ric Flair in a Steel Cage match for the NWA World Heavyweight Championship with special guest referee Gene Kiniski
9.	JCP	Ric Flair vs. Dusty Rhodes; October 24, 1986	Pittsburgh, Pennsylvania	Civic Arena	15,000	Ric Flair (c) vs. Dusty Rhodes for the NWA World Heavyweight Championship
9.	JCP	Ric Flair vs. Barry Windham; March 14, 1987	Greensboro, North Carolina	Greensboro Coliseum	15,000	Ric Flair (c) vs. Barry Windham for the NWA World Heavyweight Championship
9.	JCP	Great American Bash (Day 1); July 2, 1987	Landover, Maryland	Capital Centre	15,000	Dusty Rhodes, Nikita Koloff and The Road Warriors (Animal and Hawk) vs. The Four Horsemen (Ric Flair, Lex Luger, Arn Anderson and Tully Blanchard) in a Steel Cage match
10.	JCP	Ric Flair vs. Ron Garvin; August 9, 1987	Atlanta, Georgia	The Omni	14,100	Ric Flair (c) vs. Ron Garvin for the NWA World Heavyweight Championship

Top 10 most-attended shows in the 1990s
No.	Promotion	Event	Location	Venue	Attendance	Main Event(s)
1.	NJPW / WCW	Collision in Korea (Day 2); April 29, 1995	Pyongyang, North Korea	May Day Stadium	355,000 (combined)	Antonio Inoki vs. Ric Flair
2.	NJPW / WCW	Collision in Korea (Day 1); April 28, 1995	Pyongyang, North Korea	May Day Stadium	355,000 (combined)	Shinya Hashimoto (c) vs. Scott Norton for the IWGP Heavyweight Championship
3.	NJPW / WCW	Starrcade in Tokyo Dome; March 21, 1991	Tokyo, Japan	Tokyo Dome	64,500	Tatsumi Fujinami (c - NJPW) vs. Ric Flair (c - NWA) in a Champion vs. Champion match for the IWGP Heavyweight Championship and NWA World Heavyweight Championships
4.	NJPW / WCW	Starrcade in Tokyo Dome; January 4, 1992	Tokyo, Japan	Tokyo Dome	60,000	Sting (WCW) and The Great Muta (NJPW) vs. The Steiner Brothers (Rick Steiner and Scott Steiner)
5.	NJPW / WCW	Wrestling Dontaku in Fukuoka Dome; May 1, 1994	Fukuoka, Japan	Fukuoka Dome	53,000	Antonio Inoki vs. The Great Muta
6.	WCW	WCW Monday Nitro (Ep. 147); July 6, 1998	Atlanta, Georgia	Georgia Dome	41,412	Hollywood Hogan (c) vs. Bill Goldberg for the WCW World Heavyweight Championship
7.	WCW	WCW Monday Nitro (Ep. 173); January 4, 1999	Atlanta, Georgia	Georgia Dome	38,809	Hollywood Hogan vs. Kevin Nash (c) for the WCW World Heavyweight Championship
8.	WCW	WCW Monday Nitro (Ep. 169); December 7, 1998	Houston, Texas	Reliant Astrodome	32,067	Bill Goldberg (c) vs. Bam Bam Bigelow for the WCW World Heavyweight Championship
9.	WCW	WCW Monday Nitro (Ep. 171); December 21, 1998	St. Louis, Missouri	Trans World Dome	29,000	Bill Goldberg (c) vs. Scott Hall for the WCW World Heavyweight Championship
10.	WCW	WCW Monday Nitro (Ep. 121); January 5, 1998	Atlanta, Georgia	Georgia Dome	26,773	Lex Luger vs. Randy Savage

Top 10 most-attended shows in the 2000s
No.	Promotion	Event	Location	Venue	Attendance	Main Event(s)
1.	WCW	WCW Nitro U.K. Tour 2000! (Day 3); March 12, 2000	Manchester, England	Manchester Evening News Arena	16,318	The Mamalukes (Johnny the Bull and Big Vito) (c) vs. The Harris Brothers (Ron Harris and Don Harris) for the WCW World Tag Team Championship
2.	WCW	Souled Out; January 16, 2000	Cincinnati, Ohio	Firstar Center	14,132	Sid Vicious vs. Chris Benoit for the vacant WCW World Heavyweight Championship with special guest referee Arn Anderson
3.	WCW	Spring Stampede; April 16, 2000	Chicago, Illinois	United Center	12,556	Diamond Dallas Page vs. Jeff Jarrett for the vacant WCW World Heavyweight Championship
4.	WCW	WCW Monday Nitro (Ep. 227); January 24, 2000	Los Angeles, California	Staples Center	12,106	Kevin Nash vs. Sid Vicious for the vacant WCW World Heavyweight Championship
5.	WCW	WCW Nitro U.K. Tour 2000! (Day 1); March 10, 2000	Birmingham, England	National Exhibition Centre	11,812	Ric Flair vs. Curt Hennig
6.	WCW	WCW Millennium Tour; February 12, 2000	Oberhausen, Germany	Oberhausen Arena	11,000	Sid Vicious (c) vs. Jeff Jarrett for the WCW World Heavyweight Championship
7.	WCW	WCW Monday Nitro (Ep. 226); January 17, 2000	Columbus, Ohio	Value City Arena	10,646	Diamond Dallas Page vs. Buff Bagwell with special referee Kimberly
8.	WCW	WCW Nitro U.K. Tour 2000! (Day 2); March 11, 2000	London, England	London Docklands Arena	10,450	Ric Flair and Lex Luger vs. Booker, Buff Bagwell and Curt Hennig in a Handicap match
9.	WCW	WCW Millennium Final; November 16, 2000	Oberhausen, Germany	Oberhausen Arena	9,800	Sting (c) vs. Kevin Nash for the European Cup with special referee Axel Schulz
10.	WCW	WCW Monday Nitro (Ep. 231); February 21, 2000	Sacramento, California	ARCO Arena	9,408	Hulk Hogan vs. Lex Luger

== See also ==
- List of professional wrestling attendance records
- List of professional wrestling attendance records in Canada
- List of professional wrestling attendance records in Europe
- List of professional wrestling attendance records in Japan
- List of professional wrestling attendance records in Mexico
- List of professional wrestling attendance records in Puerto Rico
- List of professional wrestling attendance records in the United Kingdom
- List of professional wrestling attendance records in the United States
- List of WWE attendance records
