= Édouard Carpentier =

French and Canadian professional wrestler (1926–2010)

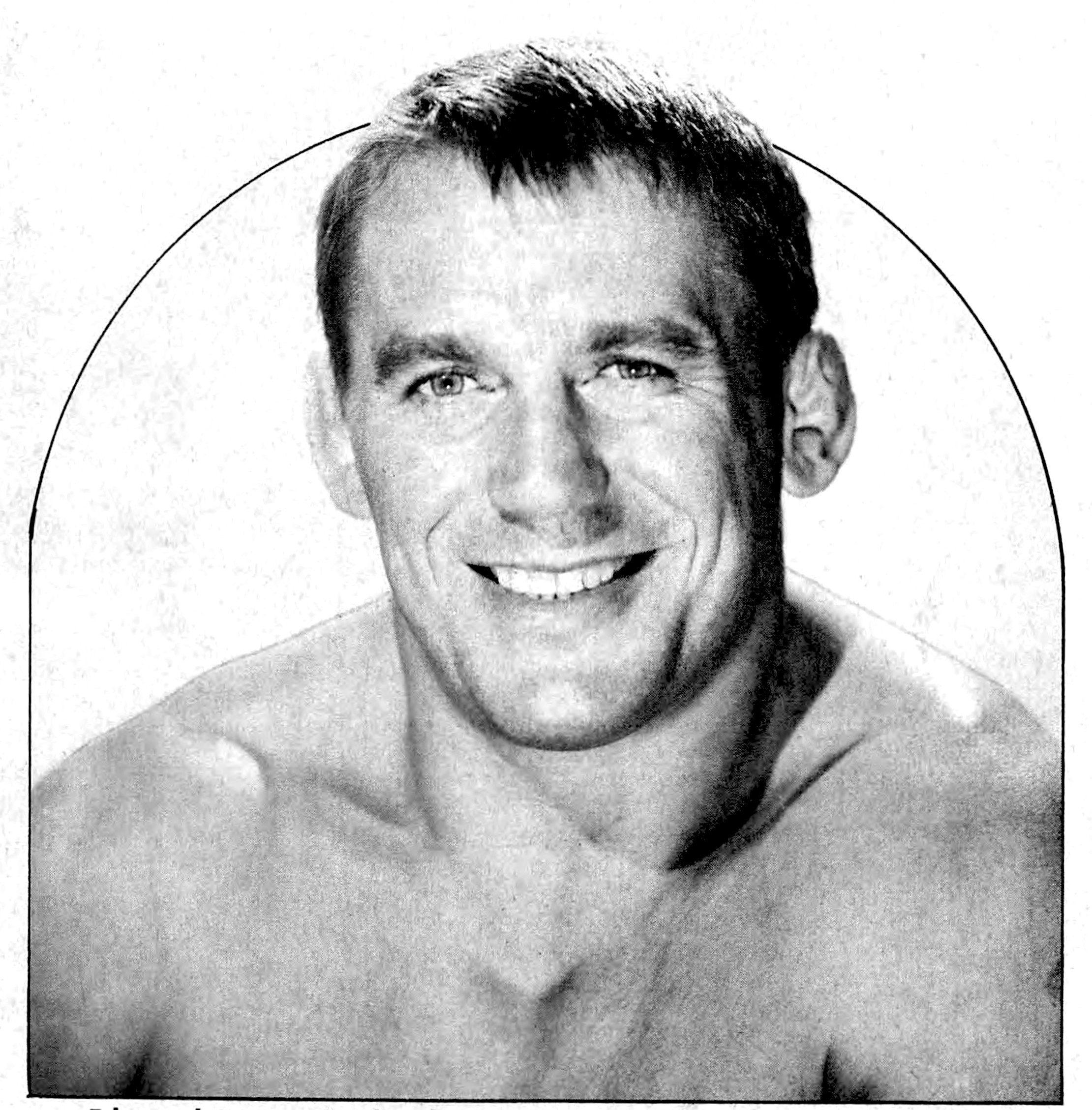
- Carpentier in 1973

Personal information
- Born: Édouard Ignacz Weiczorkiewicz; 17 July 1926 Roanne, Rhône-Alpes, France
- Died: 30 October 2010 (aged 84) Montreal, Quebec, Canada

Professional wrestling career
- Ring name(s): Édouard Ignacz Weiczorkiewicz; Édouard Carpentier; Édouard Weiczorkiewicz Carpentier; Flying Frenchman; Eddy Wiechoski
- Billed height: 5 ft 10 in (1.78 m)
- Billed weight: 230 lb (100 kg)
- Billed from: Montreal, Quebec, Canada
- Trained by: Lino Ventura; Yvon Robert
- Debut: 1953
- Retired: November 16, 1987

Édouard Ignacz Weiczorkiewicz (July 17, 1926 – October 30, 2010), better known by his ring name Édouard Carpentier, was a French and Canadian professional wrestler, gymnast, and member of the French Resistance during World War II.

Carpentier began his wrestling career in Europe as Eddy Wiechoski, before being brought to Canada by promoters Eddie Quinn in 1956, where he quickly became a popular babyface. Over the course of his career, Carpentier held multiple world heavyweight championships, including the NWA World Heavyweight Championship and the WWA World Heavyweight Championship.

Nicknamed "The Flying Frenchman", Carpentier championed a high-flying wrestling style, and was known for his athletic manoeuvres including "back flips, cartwheels and somersaults". After retiring from wrestling, he became a colour commentator for Lutte Internationale and later the World Wrestling Federation (WWF).

== Early life ==
Édouard Ignacz Weiczorkiewicz (Russian: Эдуард Виецз) was born in 1926 in Roanne, Loire, to a Russian innkeeper father and a Polish mother. He developed an interest in gymnastics and Greco-Roman wrestling from a young age, and became an all-around athlete.

During World War II, at the age of 16, he was captured and imprisoned by German occupation forces. He was sent to a concentration camp outside Paris, but escaped captivity, and promptly joined the French Resistance. After the war, he was awarded both the Croix de Guerre and the Croix du combattant medals for his service.

After the war, Weiczorkiewicz obtained a degree in physical education. He qualified as an alternate for the French Gymnastics Team at both the 1948 and 1952 Summer Olympics, though he did not compete. He was also part of the French national team at the 1950 Artistic Gymnastics World Championships.

== Professional wrestling career ==
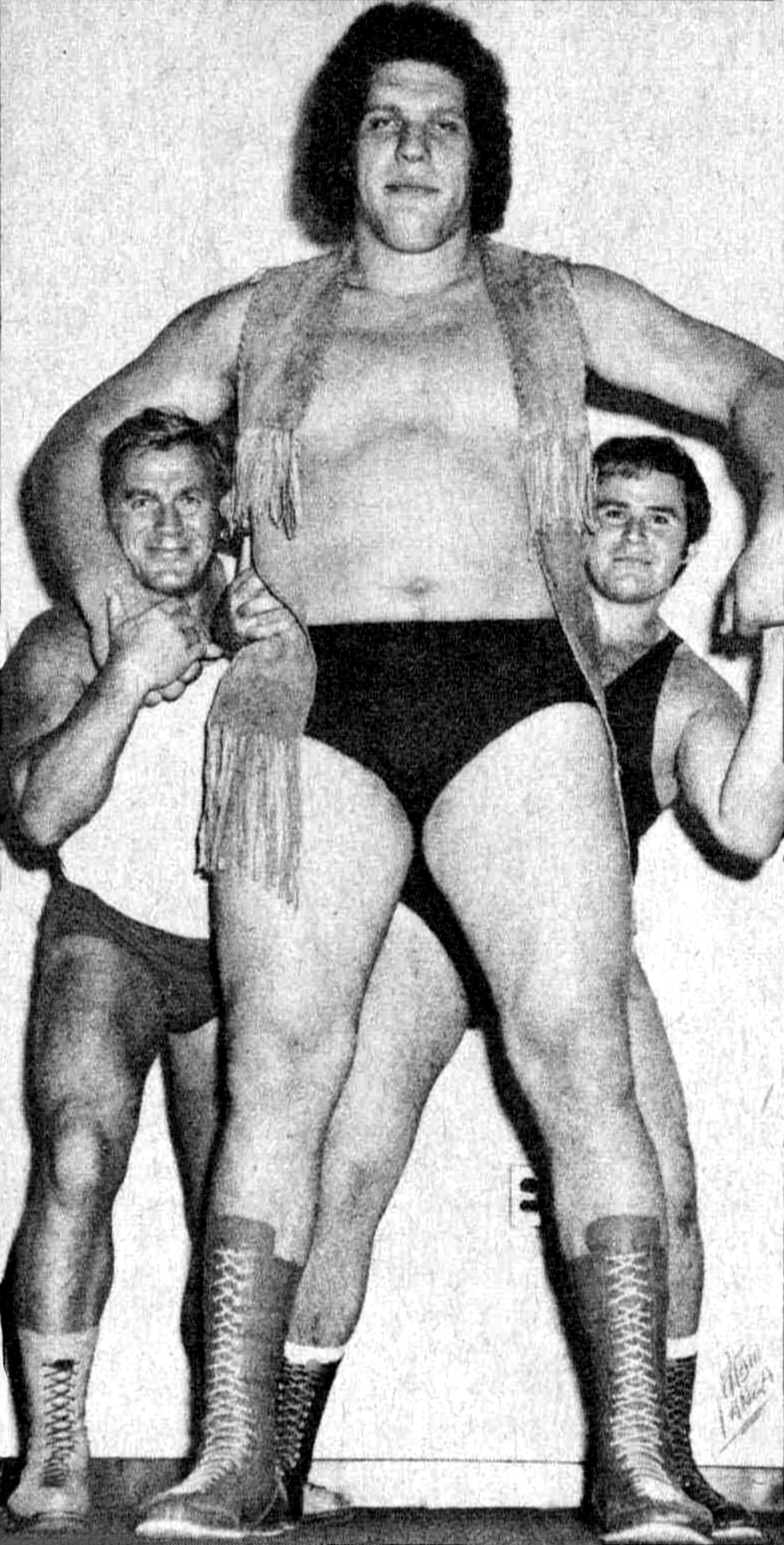
Carpentier (left) with André the Giant and Yvon Robert Jr.

=== In Europe ===
Weiczorkiewicz was introduced to professional wrestling by his friend, film star Lino Ventura. Prior to his acting career, Ventura had been a successful wrestler under the ring name "The Italian Rocket" Lino Borrini. Ventura initially employed Weiczorkiewicz as a stuntman, doubling for Eddie Constantine, but suggested to he take up wrestling. He initially used the ring name "Eddy Wiechoski".

=== In North America ===
In 1956, Weiczorkiewicz was spotted by Canadian wrestler Larry Moquin. Impressed by the young Frenchman's athleticism and ring ability, he recommended him to promoters Eddie Quinn and Yvon Robert. Robert offered Weiczorkiewicz a contract to wrestle in Montreal, and Weiczorkiewicz moved there later that year. He adopted the ring name "Edouard Carpentier," after boxer Georges Carpentier, and was billed as the "European Heavyweight Champion." He later became a naturalised Canadian citizen.

Carpentier was a crowd favourite, one of the first wrestlers to delight fans with acrobatic leaps from the turnbuckles and a variety of other aerial manoeuvres such as the rope-aided twisting headscissors. He was always a fan favourite in his bouts and was matched against numerous villains, perhaps the most well known of whom was the legendary Killer Kowalski.

In 1961, he was one of several Montreal wrestling stars to be featured in Wrestling (French: La lutte), a National Film Board of Canada documentary. The highpoint of his career was his NWA World Heavyweight Championship reign from 1956 to 1957. He won the title in a disputed contest against Lou Thesz on 14 June 1957. Some NWA territories and officials recognized the disputed win as a legitimate title change, while others did not. This led to the split of the NWA and led to the creation of other organizations, all with their own world titles. He was later recognized as the first holder of the Omaha version of the World Heavyweight Championship. He eventually dropped the belt to Verne Gagne. The Omaha title was unified with the AWA World Heavyweight Championship in 1963.

Carpentier headlined Madison Square Garden three times in 1962 with tag team partner Bobo Brazil. They had two main events against Buddy Rogers & Handsome Johnny Barend; another against Rogers & Killer Kowalski. He teamed numerous times with Antonino Rocca, as well as with Vittorio Apollo. In solo matches at the Garden, he defeated Giant Baba, Skull Murphy, Magnificent Maurice, and Hans Mortier in 1963. After working for WWWF, Carpentier returned to work in Europe and Canada.

In 1967, he returned to the WWWF as a popular babyface feuding with Gorilla Monsoon, Baron Mikel Scicluna, George Steele, Toru Tanaka and Luke Graham (wrestler). He sometimes teamed with Bruno Sammartino. Carpentier left the WWWF in 1968.

From 1969 to 1972, Carpentier worked for Verne Gagne's American Wrestling Association in Minneapolis. During the 1970s, Carpentier worked in various territories in the States, Japan and Canada in Montreal and Toronto.

In 1980, Carpentier worked for Montreal's Lutte Internationale until 1984.

On November 16, 1987, Carpeniter returned to the World Wrestling Federation for a one-night appearance at a house show in East Rutherford, New Jersey participating in a Legends Battle Royal won by Lou Thesz. After that, he retired from wrestling at 61 years old.

=== Retirement ===
After his retirement, Carpentier operated a school for teaching professional wrestling skills. He also operated in the early 1980s as a babyface colour commentator, alongside heel play-by-play host Guy Hauray, for the Montreal-based Lutte Internationale, and then, together for the World Wrestling Federation, when the WWF bought the Montreal territory in 1985. They hosted the French edition of the WWF television show Superstars, sold to French-speaking countries. He was replaced by former Québécois wrestler Raymond Rougeau in 1992.

== Death ==
On 30 October 2010, Carpentier died of a heart attack at his home in Montreal, aged 84. He had also suffered a heart attack in 2000. Carpentier had been in poor health for many years, battered from his acrobatic, high-flying style.

== Championships and accomplishments ==
Carpentier in 2010.

- Atlantic Athletic Commission
  - Atlantic Athletic Commission World Heavyweight Championship (1 time)
- American Wrestling Association
  - World Heavyweight Championship (Omaha version) (1 time)
- Grand Prix Wrestling
  - Grand Prix Tag Team Championship (1 time) with Bruno Sammartino
- International Wrestling Alliance
  - IWA World Heavyweight Championship (Chicago version) (1 time)
- International Wrestling Enterprise
  - TWWA World Junior Heavyweight Championship (1 time)
- Lutte Internationale
  - Canadian International Heavyweight Championship (2 times)
  - Canadian International Tag Team Championship (1 time) - with Mad Dog Vachon
- Montreal Athletic Commission / International Wrestling Alliance
  - International Heavyweight Championship (Montreal version) (5 times)
- National Wrestling Alliance
  - NWA World Heavyweight Championship (1 time) (Note: Carpentier was awarded the title by disqualification when Thesz could not continue the match due to a back injury. For 71 days, the NWA recognized the title as being in dispute between Carpentier and Thesz.)
- North American Wrestling Alliance / Worldwide Wrestling Associates / NWA Hollywood Wrestling
  - NWA Americas Heavyweight Championship (1 time)
  - WWA World Heavyweight Championship (2 times)
  - WWA World Tag Team Championship (2 times) - with Ernie Ladd (1 time) and “Cowboy” Bob Ellis (1 time)
  - WWA International Television Tag Team Championship (4 times) - with Sándor Szabó (2 times), Nick Bockwinkel (1 time) and Ernie Ladd (1 time)
- Professional Wrestling Hall of Fame and Museum
  - Professional Wrestling Hall of Fame (class of 2010)
- Stampede Wrestling
  - Stampede Wrestling Hall of Fame (Class of 1995)
- Wrestling Observer Newsletter
  - Wrestling Observer Newsletter Hall of Fame (class of 1997)
