= Al Mills =

Canadian professional wrestler (1910–1961)

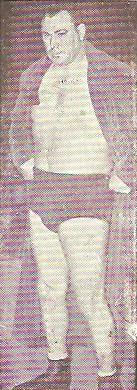
- Mills, c. 1951

Personal information
- Born: Adolph Henry Mittlestadt; November 5, 1910 Camrose, Alberta, Canada
- Died: October 7, 1961 (aged 50)
- Family: Tiny Mills (brother)

Professional wrestling career
- Ring name(s): Adolph Mittlestadt; Albert Mills; Al Mills; Black Panther; Great Zorro; Lord Albert Mills; Masked Phantom; Masked Zorro
- Billed height: 6 ft 2 in (188 cm)
- Billed weight: 264 lb (120 kg)
- Billed from: Camrose, Alberta, Canada; Missoula, Montana, US
- Trained by: Jack Taylor
- Debut: 1931
- Retired: 1960

Adolph Henry Mittlestadt (November 5, 1910 – October 7, 1961), best known by his ring name, "Mr. Murder" Al Mills, was a Canadian professional wrestler. He often teamed with his brother Tiny Mills as the tag team Murder Incorporated (Murder Inc.). Later on Stan "Krusher" Kowalski would replace him as part of Murder Incorporated.

== Professional wrestling career ==
Mills was trained by Jack Taylor. He started his wrestling career in 1931 in Canada.

Mills wrestled under a mask as "Black Panther", being unmasked by Bibber McCoy in 1942, and again by Dorv Roche in 1943. He later wrestled under a mask as "Masked Phantom", being unmasked by Swedish Angel in 1947.

Teaming with his brother Tiny Mills in 1951, they were billed as "Murder Incorporated." Al and Tiny won Toronto's NWA Canadian Open Tag Team Championship in the debut year, defeating the team of Whipper Billy Watson and Yvon Robert. They drew huge houses at Maple Leaf Gardens that year. They traded the NWA Canadian Open Tag Team Championship with Watson and Hombre Montana as well as Ernie and Emil Dusek in 1954 and won the Championship once more in 1955, which was also the year Al made his final wrestling appearance in Toronto.

Mills died on October 7, 1961.

== Professional wrestling style and persona ==
Mills wrestled in a "brawler" style. He was nicknamed "Mr. Murder". His signature moves were the backbreaker and the abdominal stretch.

== Championships and accomplishments ==
- Alex Turk Promotions
  - Manitoba Tag Team Championship (1 time) - with Tiny Mills
- Maple Leaf Wrestling
  - NWA Canadian Open Tag Team Championship (6 times) – with Tiny Mills (5) and Stan Kowalski (1)
- Stampede Wrestling
  - NWA Canadian Tag Team Championship (Calgary version) (2 times) – with Tiny Mills
  - NWA Canadian Heavyweight Championship (Calgary version) (5 times)
