= Eddie Quinn =

American manager and professional wrestling promoter (1906 – 1965)

Personal information
- Born: May 22, 1906 Waltham, Massachusetts, U.S.
- Died: December 14, 1965 (aged 59) North Hampton, New Hampshire, U.S.

Professional wrestling career
- Ring name: Eddie Quinn
- Debut: 1936
- Retired: 1964

Edmund R. Quinn (May 22, 1906 – December 14, 1965) was an American manager and professional wrestling promoter in Canada and the United States. He grew up in Massachusetts and organized boxing and wrestling events in New England and such cities as St. Louis, Missouri, Chicago, Illinois, and Montreal, Quebec. Bringing gimmicks and showmanship back to professional wrestling in Montreal, he helped restimulate local interest in the sport. Quinn died of a cerebral hemorrhage in 1965.

== Early years ==
Quinn was born in Waltham, Massachusetts and got involved in boxing as a youth. He later took a job as a taxi driver in Brookline, Massachusetts. In the 1930s, Quinn began promoting professional wrestling shows in Massachusetts, where he had a business relationship with fellow wrestling promoter Paul Bowser.

== Montreal ==
Quinn's big break came on July 27, 1939, when the Montreal Athletic Commission granted him rights to promote wrestling events in the Montreal Forum. He chose to avoid the “scientific wrestling” favored by Jack Ganson, the previous promoter at the Forum. Instead of what he called “pink wrestling”, Quinn pushed gimmickry, storylines, and bloody brawls.

Quinn's shows began on August 8, 1939, with Yvon Robert as his central attraction. Other stars of his promotion included Édouard Carpentier, Yukon Eric, and Killer Kowalski. At one point, Gorgeous George was brought in for a series of matches against Yvon Robert. Another famous match featured boxer Jersey Joe Walcott facing wrestler Buddy Rogers, which Rogers won in the third round.

== Other territories ==
Over time, Quinn also expanded his territory, organizing events throughout Quebec and New England. In 1959, he began promoting wrestling events in Chicago. The following year, he stated that he controlled most of the wrestling events in Canada and Boston as well as substantial portions of Chicago and St. Louis. Having made professional wrestling more popular in Quebec than any sport aside from hockey, Quinn earned up to $250,000. He ran into trouble in 1961, when a boxing match between Archie Moore and Bob Cleroux failed to attract as many ticket purchases as hoped. Quinn decided to cancel the event and was stripped of his boxing and wrestling promoter's licenses as a result. His wrestling license was reinstated several weeks later.

Aside from the storylines in his promotions, Quinn also ensured success through television exposure and connections with influential people. He pointed to the massive increases in ticket sales that occurred after his featured wrestlers gained notoriety through televised shows in Chicago. He also held a television contract with the Canadian Broadcasting Corporation. Quinn befriended Elmer Ferguson, a Montreal sportswriter, in a relationship that was advantageous to Quinn's wrestling organization. He also promoted events for charity and donated money to powerful political figures. When decisions were made regarding professional wrestling, Quinn's acquaintances sided with him.

Quinn had a negative relationship with promoter Jack Pfefer, who Quinn described in a letter published in the New York Daily Mirror as “the Cancer of the Wrestling Business”. He also had a disagreement with Sam Muchnick in 1957 about control of Carpentier, who Quinn had begun managing. Quinn promised to involve the United States Department of Justice if the matter was not resolved quickly. In 1960, Quinn allowed Bob Langevin to become the public face of his promotion, while Quinn dealt more with the financial aspects.

In 1964, Quinn retired from the wrestling business and purchased the Hobb Nursing Home in North Hampton, New Hampshire. In 1965, Quinn suffered a cerebral hemorrhage and died in the nursing home he had purchased on December 14.

== Awards ==
- Wrestling Observer Newsletter
  - Wrestling Observer Newsletter Hall of Fame (Class of 2015)

== See also ==
- List of professional wrestling promoters
