= Yvon Robert Jr. =

Canadian professional wrestler (1942 – 2008)

Personal information
- Born: October 14, 1942 Montreal, Quebec, Canada
- Died: April 30, 2008 (aged 65) Montreal, Quebec, Canada
- Relative: Yvon Robert (father)

Professional wrestling career
- Ring name(s): Yvon Robert Jr. Bob Brunelle
- Billed height: 6 ft 1 in (1.85 m)
- Billed weight: 242 lb (110 kg)
- Trained by: Yvon Robert; Edouard Carpentier
- Debut: 1967
- Retired: 1977

Yvon Robert Jr. (October 14, 1942 – April 30, 2008) was a French Canadian professional wrestler who was best known to fans as Yvon Robert Jr. mainly in Montreal and AWA. He was the son of Quebec and Canadian legend Yvon Robert.

== Professional wrestling career ==
Robert was influenced by his father Yvon Robert Sr. and was trained by his father. He made his wrestling debut in 1967 in Montreal. In 1969, he made his debut in the United States working for American Wrestling Association in Minneapolis, Minnesota as Bob Brunelle.

In 1971, he returned to Montreal and started working for the new Montreal-based promotion Grand Prix Wrestling run by the Vachons. He would often team with Edouard Carpentier and sometimes Andre the Giant in six tag matches. Later in his career, he worked in Germany, Georgia, Toronto and Quebec until he retired in 1977.

== Personal life ==
On July 12, 1971, Robert's father Yvon sr. died at his home in Laval, Quebec. He was entombed at the Notre Dame des Neiges Cemetery in Montreal.

After retiring from wrestling, he worked in real estate.

On April 30, 2008, Robert died from complications of diabetes and a heart attack in hospital at 65. He had battled numerous health problems over the past few years and was hospitalized in 2006, and his leg was amputated due to diabetes.
