= Dusek family =

Professional wrestling family

Footage of a tag team match between two of the Dusek brothers against "Moquin and Watson of Canada" in Montreal in 1948

The Dusek family was a professional wrestling family. Its real surname was Hason. It started with four brothers, Ernie, Emil, Joe and Rudy, often billed as the Dusek Riot Squad and well known in the Omaha, Nebraska territory. They were considered the first heel stable.

The family also wrestled in the New York territory. After Emil was injured in a car accident, he was replaced by Wally, a kayfabe cousin (real name Santen); Wally's real son Frank later debuted.

Emil and Ernie were inducted into the Professional Wrestling Hall of Fame and Museum in 2008. In 2018, Joe was inducted into the Nebraska Pro Wrestling Hall of Fame. In 2021, Ernie, Emil and Rudy joined him.

== Members ==
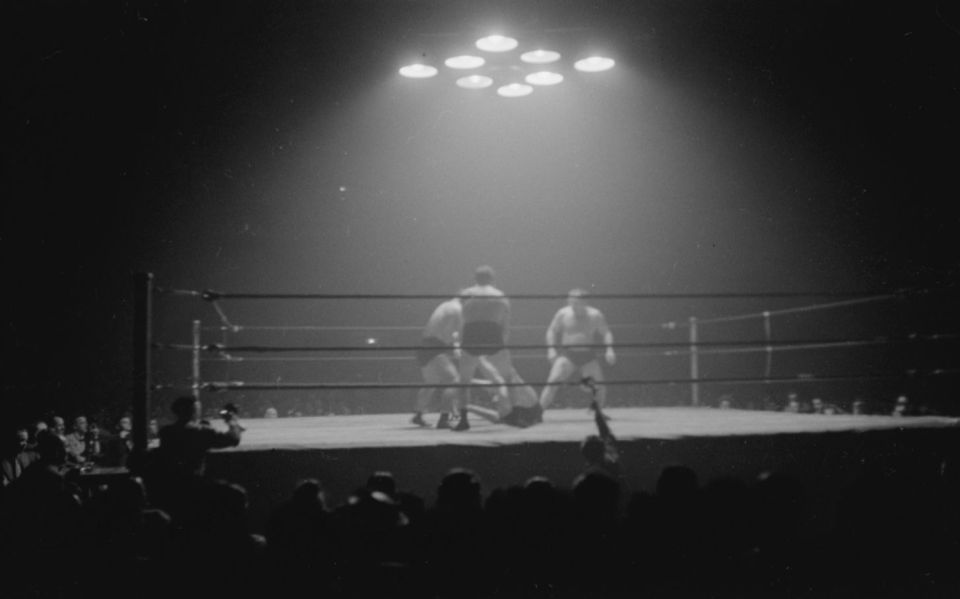
Two brothers of the Dusek Family against Yvon Robert and Laurent "Larry" Moquin, during a tag team wrestling match, June 1945

=== Real ===
==== Ernie ====
Ernie Dusek was born in Omaha, Nebraska on January 26, 1909, to Anton and Maria Hason, Bohemian immigrants. He wrestled with Rudy and Emil in the New York territory from 1933 to 1940. He was the NWA Texas Heavyweight Champion until he was beaten by Lou Thesz in Houston. He wrestled many famous wrestlers, such as Warren Bockwinkel, George Zaharias, Lou Thesz, Wladek Zbyszko, Yvon Robert, Karl Sarpolis, Sandor Szabo, Mike Mazurki, Abe Coleman and Man Mountain Dean. He won the NWA Southern Tag Team Championship (Mid-Atlantic version) two times with Emil. They took the NWA Canadian Open Tag Team Championship from Tiny Mills and Al Mills in Toronto. He died in Omaha, Nebraska, on April 11, 1994.

==== Emil ====
Emil Dusek was born in Omaha, Nebraska on March 31, 1905. He wrestled with Rudy and Ernie in the New York territory from 1934 to 1940. He wrestled legends Danno O'Mahony and Ed Lewis and lost to both. He won the NWA Southern Tag Team Championship Mid-Atlantic version two times with Ernie. He won the NWA Canadian Open Tag Team Championship with Ernie in Toronto from Tiny and Al Mills. He died on July 9, 1986.

==== Rudy ====
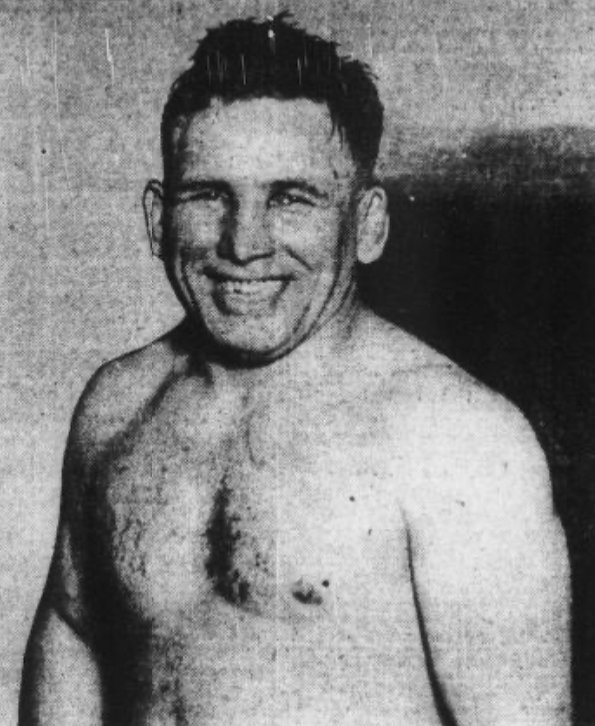
Rudy Dusek in a 1931 publication

Rudy Dusek was born on January 25, 1901, in Omaha, Nebraska. He wrestled with Emil and Ernie in the New York territory from 1933 to 1940. He wrestled for the NYSAC Heavyweight Title against Jim Browning and against George Zaharias to a curfew draw at St. Nicholas Arena. He went over an hour in a draw with Karol Zbyszko and faced many legendary wrestlers in his day, such as Jim Londos, Steve Casey, George Zaharias, Ed Lewis and Sandor Szabo. He was defeated by the Bulgarian Dan Koloff in 1919. He died on October 27, 1971.

==== Joe ====
Joe Dusek was born in Omaha, Nebraska, on December 12, 1910. He wrestled with Rudy, Ernie and Emil in the New York territory from 1935 to 1940. He lost to Ed Lewis and also wrestled French great Yvon Robert to a draw. As a promoter, he gave Tim Woods the name Mr. Wrestling. He died on October 31, 1992, in Omaha, Nebraska.

=== Kayfabe ===
==== Wally ====
Wally Dusek was the stage name of professional wrestler Charlie Santen who was born on August 10, 1909. Though billed as a Dusek brother when they teamed, they were unrelated. He was trained by famed wrestler John Pesek. He was a road agent and an announcer for Jim Crockett's Mid-Atlantic Championship Wrestling before retiring and died on October 29, 1991.

==== Frank ====
Frank Dusek (sometimes billed as "Captain" Frank Dusek) was the stage name of Frank Santen (Wally's real son), born June 1952. He was a wrestler, television commentator and matchmaker for World Class Championship Wrestling while the company was shown on ESPN. He won the NWA Southern Heavyweight Championship from Barry Windham and commentated for the Universal Wrestling Federation.

== Championships and accomplishments ==
- American Wrestling Association
  - Nebraska Heavyweight Championship ( 3 times ) - Ernie Dusek
- Cauliflower Alley Club
  - Family Award (2000)
- Central States Wrestling
  - NWA Central States Heavyweight Championship (1 time) – Joe Dusek
  - NWA World Tag Team Championship (Central States version) (3 times) – Emil and Ernie Dusek
- Championship Wrestling from Florida
  - NWA Southern Heavyweight Championship (Florida version) (1 time) – Frank Dusek
- International Wrestling Association (Montreal)
  - IWA International Heavyweight Championship (1 time) – Ernie Dusek
- Maple Leaf Wrestling
  - NWA Canadian Open Tag Team Championship (1 time) – Emil and Ernie and Dusek
- Mid-Atlantic Championship Wrestling
  - NWA Southern Tag Team Championship (Mid-Atlantic version) (2 times) – Emil and Ernie Dusek
- NWA Southwest Sports
  - NWA World Tag Team Championship (Texas version) (1 time) – Frank Dusek and Bill Irwin
- NWA San Francisco
  - NWA World Tag Team Championship (San Francisco version) (1 time) – Emil and Ernie Dusek
- Professional Wrestling Hall of Fame
  - Class of 2008 – Emil and Ernie Dusek
- Southwest Sports
  - Texas Heavyweight Championship (1 time) – Ernie Dusek
- Wrestling Observer Newsletter
  - Wrestling Observer Newsletter Hall of Fame (Class of 1996 – The Dusek Family)
- Nebraska Pro Wrestling Hall of Fame
  - Joe in 2018, Ernie, Emil and Rudy in 2021
