= Renato Gardini =

Italian wrestler

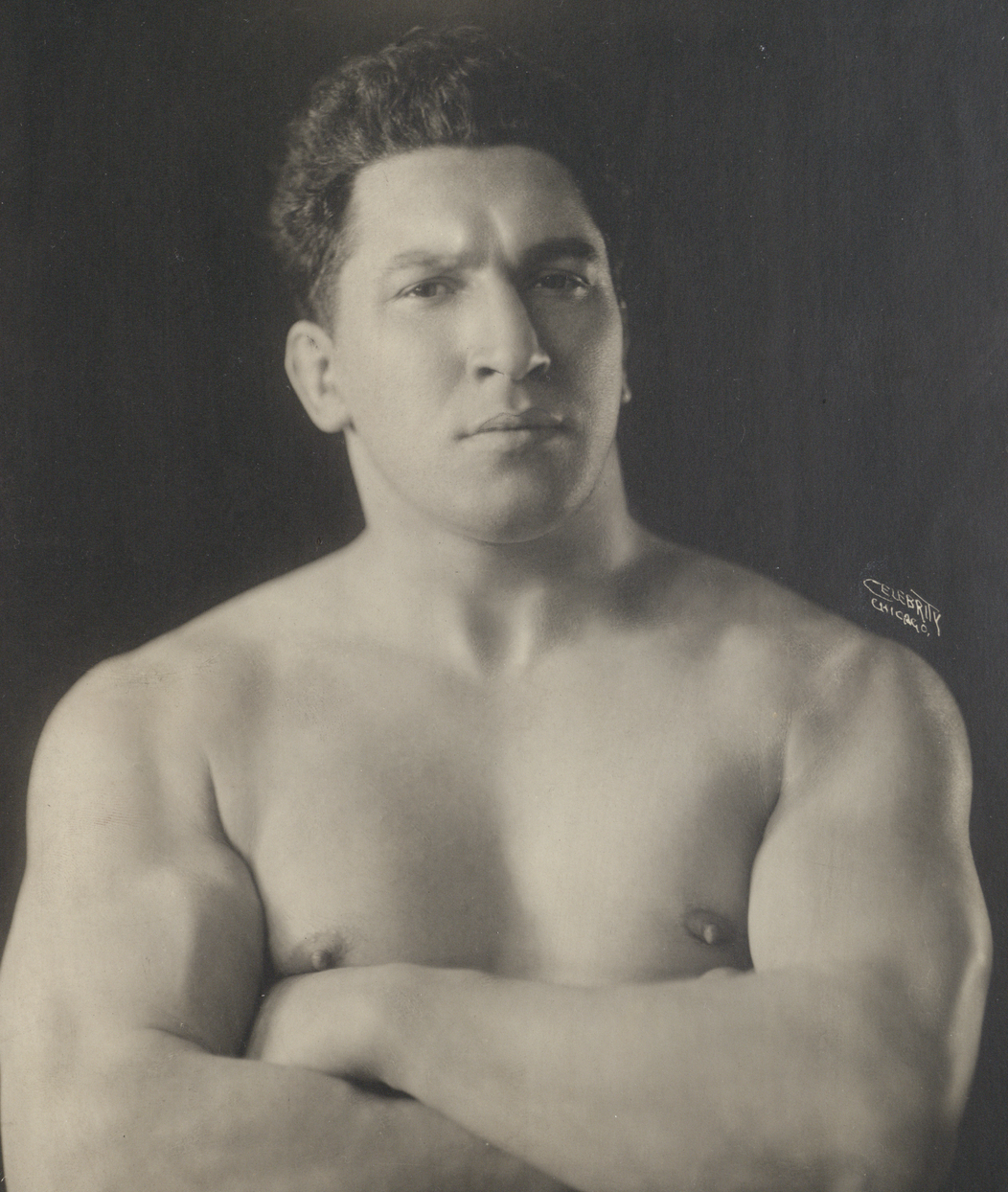
- Gardini in 1924
- Born: 10 March 1889; Bologna, Italy
- Died: 29 September 1940 (aged 51); Buenos Aires, Argentina

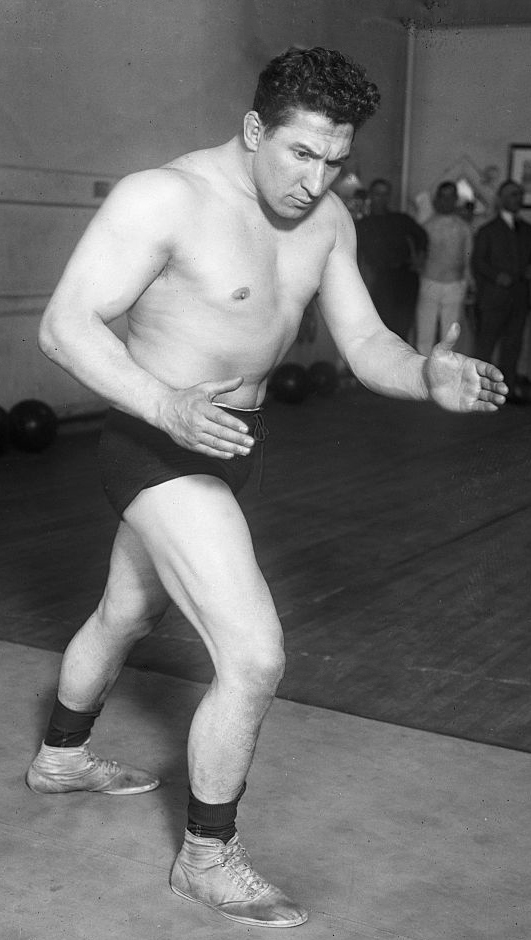

Renato Umberto Giorgio Gardini (10 March 1889 – 29 September 1940) was a Greco-Roman wrestler from Italy. He competed in the 1912 Olympics, but lost in the fourth bout to Anders Ahlgren. After the Olympics he immigrated to the United States, where he competed professionally, and got married in 1922. He spent much time promoting wrestling in South America, where he died in 1940.
