= Wild Bill Longson =

American professional wrestler (1906-1982)

Personal information
- Born: Willard Rowe Longson; June 8, 1906 Salt Lake City, Utah, U.S.
- Died: December 12, 1982 (aged 76) St. Louis, Missouri, U.S

Professional wrestling career
- Ring name(s): Purple Shadow; Wild Bill Longson
- Billed height: 6 ft 2 in (188 cm)
- Billed weight: 240 lb (110 kg)
- Debut: April 1931
- Retired: 1960

Willard Rowe Longson (June 8, 1906 – December 12, 1982) was an American professional wrestler, better known by his ring name, Wild Bill Longson. He spent most of his career in St. Louis, Missouri. He perfected the role of the arrogant heel, and is credited with inventing and popularizing the piledriver.

== Professional wrestling career ==
Longson was a three-time National Wrestling Association World Heavyweight Champion during the 1940s. He first won the title from Sandor Szabo, before losing the title to Yvon Robert. Longson won his second title from Bobby Managoff before losing to Whipper Billy Watson. He won his third and final title from Lou Thesz.

Longson lost his title for the final time to Thesz on July 20, 1948, when Thesz elevated onto Longson's shoulders from the piledriver position and fell into a Thesz press. The following year, Thesz was awarded National Wrestling Alliance World Championship by default after champion Orville Brown was forced to retire after an automobile accident. Following this, the Alliance withdrew recognition of Brown's reign in favor of a lineage traced via the Association's lineage - ultimately back to George Hackenschmidt in 1905 - beginning the process of consolidating all American world championships into one. As a result of this, the Alliance retroactively recognises Longson as a three time World champion.

Longson retired from professional wrestling in 1960 after sustaining a broken pelvis while riding an unbroken horse. He continued to work in the professional wrestling industry as a booker and promoter until 1977.

Longson died on December 10, 1982, in St. Louis.

== Championships and accomplishments ==
- Central States Wrestling
  - NWA Central States Heavyweight Championship (1 time)
- International Wrestling Association (Montreal)
  - IWA International Heavyweight Championship (1 time)
- National Wrestling Association
  - NWA World Heavyweight Championship (3 times)
- NWA San Francisco
  - NWA Pacific Coast Heavyweight Championship (San Francisco version) (3 times)
- Professional Wrestling Hall of Fame
  - Class of 2006
- Southwest Sports
  - NWA Brass Knuckles Championship (Texas version) (1 time)
  - NWA World Tag Team Championship (1 time) - with Ike Eakin
- St. Louis Wrestling Hall Of Fame
  - Class of 2007
- Wrestling Observer Newsletter
  - Wrestling Observer Newsletter Hall of Fame (Class of 2000)
