= Jack Taylor (Canadian wrestler) =

Personal information
- Born: 1887 Ontario, Canada
- Died: May 19, 1956 Edmonton, Alberta, Canada

Professional wrestling career
- Billed height: 6 ft 1 in (185 cm)
- Billed weight: 212 lb (15 st 2 lb; 96 kg)
- Debut: 1911
- Retired: 1942

Jack Taylor (1887 – May 19, 1956) was a Canadian successful amateur and professional wrestler. Considered to be Canada's first great wrestling superstar in his time he was the childhood idol of wrestling icon Stu Hart and trained Toots Mondt.

== Championships and accomplishments ==
=== Amateur Wrestling ===
- Canadian Heavyweight Championship

=== Professional Wrestling ===
- Canadian Wrestling Hall of Fame
  - Class of 2016
- Stampede Wrestling
  - Stampede Wrestling Hall of Fame (Class of 1995)
