= Yvon Robert =

Canadian professional wrestler (1914 – 1971)

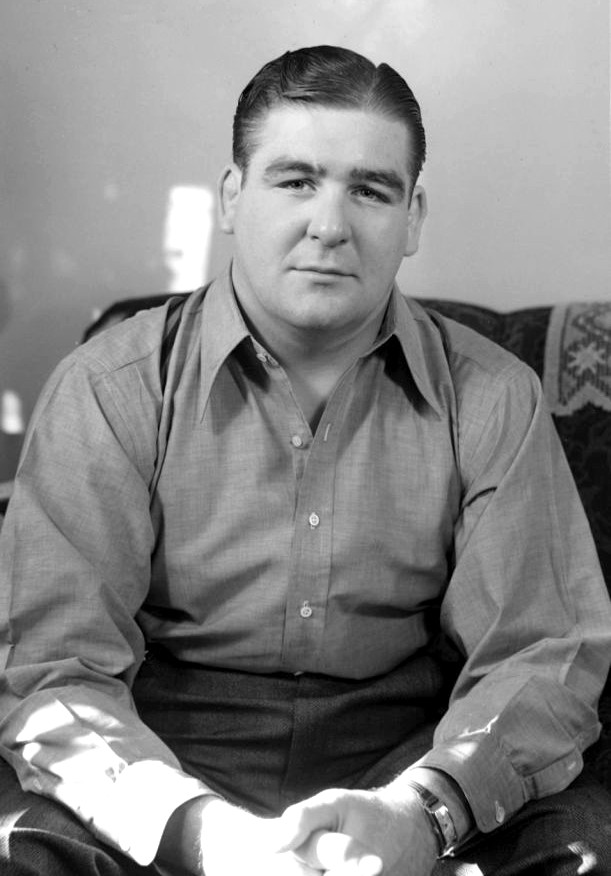

Personal information
- Born: 9 October 1914 Montreal, Quebec, Canada
- Died: 12 July 1971 (aged 56) Laval, Quebec, Canada

Professional wrestling career
- Ring name(s): Yvon Robert; The French Canadian Lion
- Billed height: 6 ft 0 in (1.83 m)
- Billed weight: 250 lb (110 kg)
- Trained by: Emil Maupas
- Debut: April 9, 1932
- Retired: 1959

Yvon Robert (8 October 1914 – 12 July 1971), nicknamed "The Lion" ("Le Lion"), was a Canadian professional wrestler.

== Early life ==
Robert was born in the Verdun borough of Montreal in 1914. Athletic from a young age, his connection to wrestling began as a teenager, when he was scouted at an Outremont gym he frequented, and trained under Emil Maupas at his school in the Laurentians.

== Professional wrestling career ==
=== American Wrestling Association (1932–1935) ===
Robert made his in-ring debut in 1932 at age 17. He got his first stint in Boston with promoter Paul Bowser's American Wrestling Association (AWA) (not to be confused with the later Midwest promotion owned by Verne Gagne), where he was billed as "the French Canadian Lion". He made his professional wrestling debut on April 4, 1932. During his early career, Robert feuded with wrestlers such as Rasputin, Joe Cox and Ernie Dusek.

=== National Wrestling Association (1935–1936) ===
In 1935, he made his National Wrestling Association (NWA) debut as Yvon "The Lion" Robert. It was a territory of the National Boxing Association to sanction professional wrestling. He got his first big exposure after attacking world champion Danno O'Mahony during a match. He left the promotion in 1936.

=== Montreal (1936–1944) ===
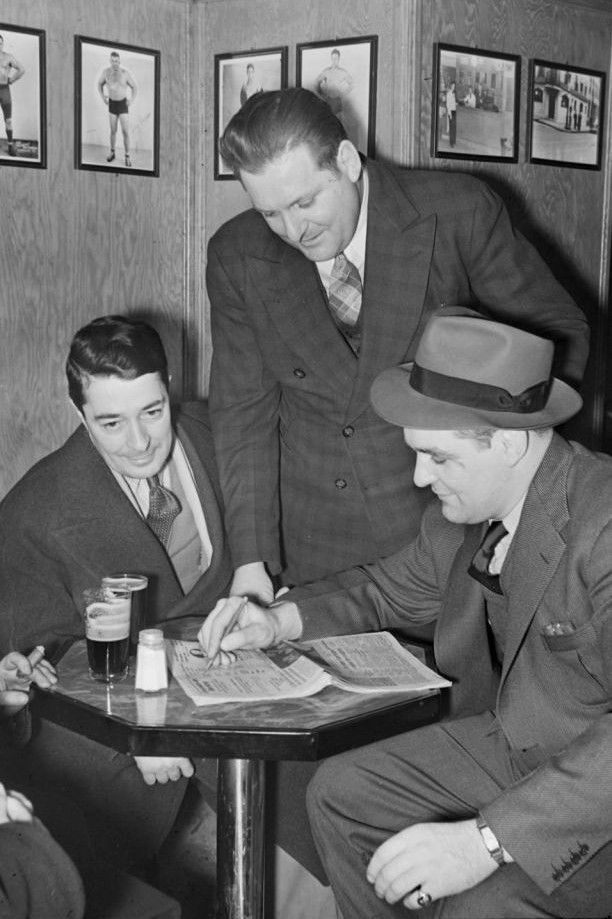
At his tavern in Montreal in 1940 with pictures of wrestlers on the wall

In April 1936, he started wrestling in Montreal, Quebec. During his time in Montreal, he won the Montreal International Heavyweight Championship 16 times between 1936 and 1956. During 1943, he won the Montreal British Empire Heavyweight Championship.

=== American Wrestling Association (1936–1940) ===
Robert returned to the Boston iteration of the AWA in July 1936. Just two weeks after his return, Robert defeated O'Mahony to win the AWA World Heavyweight Championship in Montreal, claiming his first world title. He was recognized as the world champion in New England and by the Montreal Athletic Commission. Robert was stripped in December 1937 for not defending against Lou Thesz. In 1940, he left AWA for a second time.

=== National Wrestling Association (1940–1943) ===
In 1940, he started his second stint with the NWA. There, got the biggest victory of his career, on October 7, 1942. On that day, he beat "Wild" Bill Longson to win the NWA World Heavyweight Championship in Montreal, Quebec. On November 27, he lost the title to Bobby Managoff in Houston, Texas. In 1943, he left the NWA.

=== Return to Montreal (1944–1959) ===
Robert returned to Montreal in 1944, and became a successful wrestler during this time. In 1948, he wrestled Gorgeous George to a draw before a Montreal-record gate of $21,000 and broke that record within a year. In 1953, he formed a successful tag team with Whipper Billy Watson and won the Canadian Tag Team Championship. On November 12, Watson and Robert defeated Al Mills and Tiny Mills at a wrestling event held in Toronto with boxing champion Joe Louis as the special guest referee. On January 5, 1958, he teamed with Billy Wicks to defeat Corsica Joe and Corsica Jean in Memphis, Tennessee, for the Mid-America Tag Team Championship, which would be Robert's final title. In 1959, he came out of retirement.

== Personal life ==
Robert was married to Leona. They had two daughters, Leona and Suzanne, and one son, Yvon Jr., who became a professional wrestler and promoter.

In the 1950s, Yvon was proprietor of Cafe Le Boheme at 82 Balfour Ave. in Montreal.

=== Death ===
On July 12, 1971, Robert died at his home in Laval, Quebec. He was entombed at the Notre Dame des Neiges Cemetery in Montreal.

== Championships and accomplishments ==
- American Wrestling Association (Boston)
  - AWA World Heavyweight Championship (1 time)
- Fédération Française de Catch Professionnel
  - World Heavyweight Championship (French version) (1 time)
- International Wrestling Association (Montreal)
  - IWA International Heavyweight Championship (Montreal version) (16 times)
  - IWA World Tag Team Championship (2 times) - with Herb Trawick and Pat O'Connor
- Maple Leaf Wrestling
  - NWA British Empire Heavyweight Championship (Toronto version) (3 times)
  - NWA Canadian Open Tag Team Championship (1 time) - with Whipper Billy Watson
- NWA Mid-America
  - NWA World Tag Team Championship (Mid-America version) (1 time) - with Billy Wicks
- National Wrestling Association
  - NWA World Heavyweight Championship (1 time)
- Professional Wrestling Hall of Fame and Museum
  - Class of 2017
- Wrestling Observer Newsletter
  - Wrestling Observer Newsletter Hall of Fame (Class of 1996)

== Gallery ==
Photographs of Yvon Robert
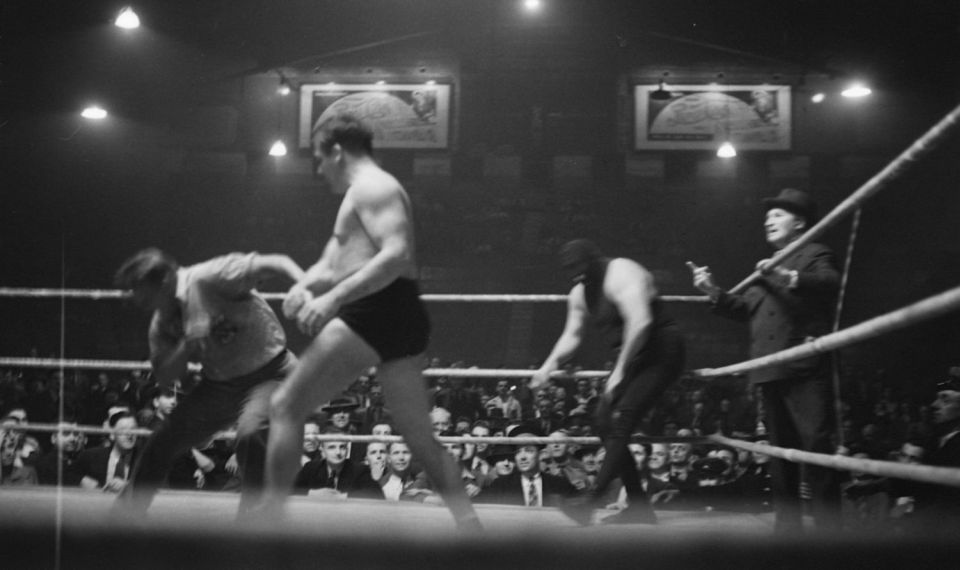
Yvon Robert against the "Green Mask", 21 May 1941

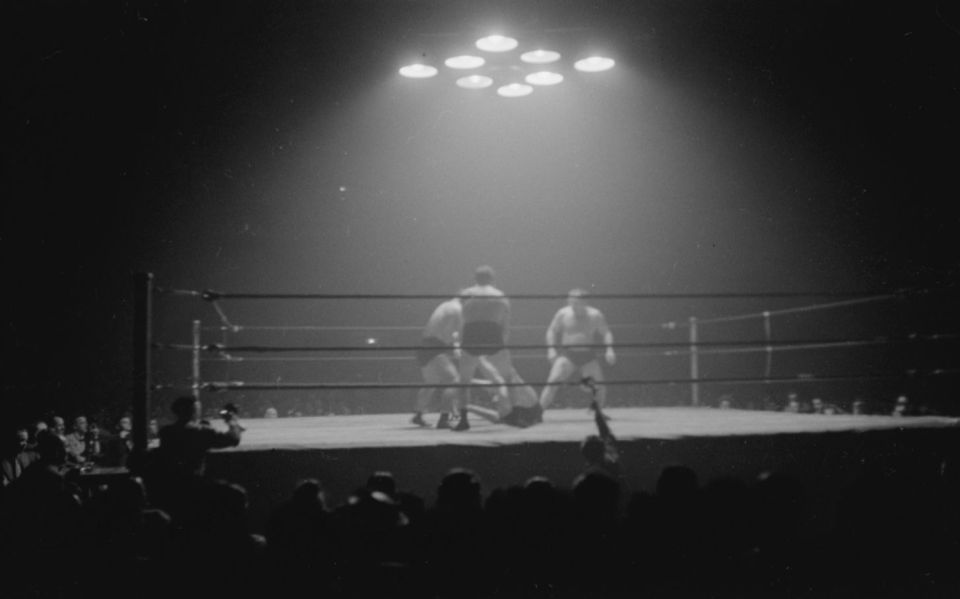
Two brothers of the Dusek Family against Yvon Robert and Laurent "Larry" Moquin, during a tag team wrestling match, Montreal, June 1945
