= Larry Moquin =

Canadian professional wrestler (1923 – 1988)

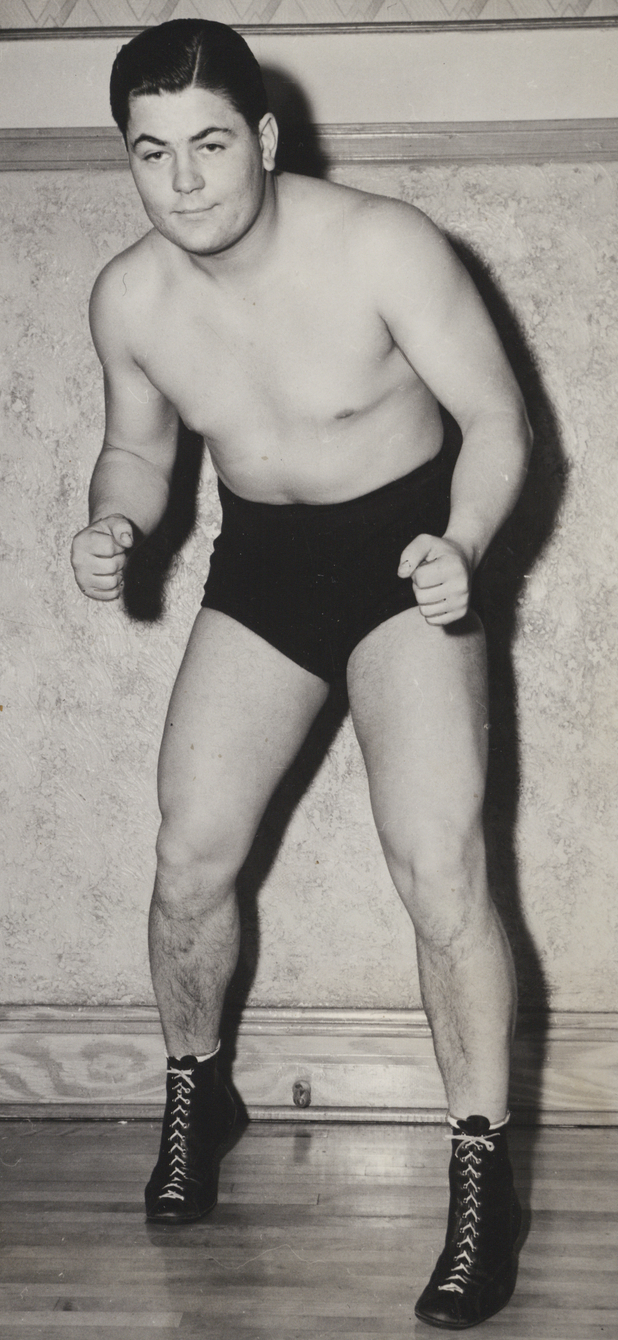

Personal information
- Born: Laurent Moquin; September 8, 1923 Montreal, Quebec, Canada
- Died: December 12, 1988 (aged 65) Montreal, Quebec, Canada

Professional wrestling career
- Ring name(s): Larry Moquin; Larry Robert; Pierre Moquin; Marquis de Paree
- Billed height: 5 ft 10 in (1.78 m)
- Billed weight: 220 lb (100 kg)
- Trained by: Yvon Robert
- Debut: 1942
- Retired: 1968

Laurent Moquin (September 8, 1923 – December 12, 1988) was a French Canadian professional wrestler who was best known to fans in Quebec as Larry Moquin.

== Professional wrestling career ==
Moquin made his professional wrestling debut in Montreal in 1942. Considered to be a protege of Quebec superstar Yvon Robert and teamed with Robert. Moquin quickly earned the reputation as a fan favorite and competed in matches throughout Canada, in the United States, and Europe. Moquin and Robert broke wrestling attendance for main events in Montreal.

In 1954, Moquin won his only title; the NWA Hawaii Heavyweight Championship which he held for nearly two months.

He wrestled in the early days of the American Wrestling Association in Minneapolis, Minnesota as Marquis de Paree.

In 1968, Moquin retired from wrestling in Montreal.

== Personal life ==
Moquin died on December 12, 1988, from cancer in Montreal at 65.

== Championships and accomplishments ==
- 50th State Big Time Wrestling
  - NWA Hawaii Heavyweight Championship (1 time)
