= Wrestling Observer Newsletter Hall of Fame =

Professional wrestling hall of fame

The Wrestling Observer Newsletter (WON) Hall of Fame is a professional wrestling and mixed martial arts (MMA) hall of fame that recognizes people who make significant contributions to their professions. It was founded in 1996 by Dave Meltzer, editor of WON. Like many other wrestling halls of fame, such as the WWE, TNA, ROH and WCW halls of fame, WON's Hall of Fame is not contained in a building. There are no ceremonies for inductions other than a highly detailed biographical documentation of their career in the newsletter. Inductees include wrestlers/fighters, managers, promoters, trainers, and commentators. On select occasions, groups, either tag teams, trios, or quartets, have been inducted rather than the individual members of the group. This first occurred in 1996, when The Fabulous Kangaroos and The Road Warriors entered the hall. The Fabulous Freebirds, The Midnight Express, The Rock 'n' Roll Express, The Assassins, The Holy Demon Army, The Sharpe Brothers, Los Misioneros de la Muerte, and Los Brazos among others all also entered as groups. Occasionally entire wrestling families have been inducted into the hall. This first occurred in 1996 when The Dusek Family entered the hall; in 2022, the five man familial team of Los Villanos was inducted.

Starting in 2022, it became possible for a wrestler to be placed in the Hall of Fame multiple times, much like inductees into the Rock and Roll Hall of Fame. So far, five people have achieved this double honor: Toshiaki Kawada, Villano III, Antonino Rocca, Jack Brisco, and Jackie Sato. Each are inducted as a singles performer and a team member (Kawada as part of Holy Demon Army, Villano III as part of Los Villanos, Rocca as part of Rocca and Perez, Jack Brisco as part of the Brisco Brothers, and Jackie Sato as part of Beauty Pair).

Meltzer began the Hall of Fame by choosing a list of 122 inaugural inductees in 1996. Since then, wrestlers from past and present, others employed in the professional wrestling industry, wrestling journalists and historians have been selected by Meltzer to cast secret ballots to determine annual groups of inductees. Voting criteria include the length of time spent in wrestling, historical significance, ability to attract viewers, and wrestling ability. Inductees must have at least 15 years of experience or be over 35 years old and have 10 years of experience. To gain membership in the hall, potential inductees must receive 60% support on the ballots from their geographic region. Any person that gets less than 10% of the vote is eliminated from the ballot. If a person fails to get inducted 15 years after being put on the ballot, they must get 50% of the vote or be eliminated. There are over 200 inductees, including the multiple teams, trios, and stables. Since voting began in 1998, nineteen candidates have been inducted in their first year of eligibility; the most recent first-ballot inductees were Beauty Pair in 2023.

In 2008, a recall vote was held asking if 2003 inductee Chris Benoit, who killed his wife and son before committing suicide in June 2007, should remain in the hall. To have Benoit removed, Meltzer required that 60% of voters must agree with the proposal. Although the majority voted for Benoit's removal, they only represented 53.6% of the votes, falling short of the number required. Benoit remains on the list of inductees.

== Inductees ==
Legend
First-ballot Hall of Famer

#	Year	Image	Ring name (Birth name)	Inducted for	Notes
1	1996		Abdullah the Butcher (Larry Shreve)	Wrestling	Won the WWC Universal Heavyweight Championship (3 times), NWA United National Championship (1 time), and PWF World Heavyweight Championship (1 time)
2	1996	—N/a	Perro Aguayo (Pedro Aguayo Damián)	Wrestling	Won the Mexican National Heavyweight Championship (1 time), Mexican National Middleweight Championship (1 time), and Mexican National Tag Team Championship (2 times)
3	1996		André the Giant (André Roussimoff)	Wrestling	Posthumous inductee; won the WWF World Heavyweight Championship (1 time) and WWF Tag Team Championship (1 time)
4	1996	—N/a	Bert Assirati	Wrestling	Posthumous inductee; won the British Heavyweight Championship (1 time) and European Heavyweight Championship (1 time)
5	1996		Giant Baba (Shohei Baba)	Wrestling and promoting	Won the NWA World Heavyweight Championship (3 times) and PWF World Heavyweight Championship (4 times); founded All Japan Pro Wrestling
6	1996		Jim Barnett	Promoting	Founded Australia's World Championship Wrestling; owned Georgia Championship Wrestling
7	1996		Red Berry (Ralph Berry)	Wrestling	Posthumous inductee; won the NWA World Light Heavyweight Championship (9 times) and NWA Texas Heavyweight Championship (2 times)
8	1996		"The Destroyer" Dick Beyer	Wrestling	Won the WWA World Heavyweight Championship (3 times) and AWA World Heavyweight Championship (1 time)
9	1996		Freddie Blassie	Wrestling and managing	Won the NWA Southern Heavyweight Championship (14 times) and NAWA/WWA World Heavyweight Championship (4 times); worked as manager after retiring as a competitor
10	1996		Blue Demon (Alexander Muñoz Moreno)	Wrestling	Won the Mexican National Welterweight Championship (3 times) and appeared in several luchador films
11	1996		Nick Bockwinkel	Wrestling	Won the AWA World Heavyweight Championship (4 times), AWA World Tag Team Championship (3 times), and NWA World Tag Team Championship (2 times)
12	1996	—N/a	Paul Boesch	Commentating and promoting	Posthumous inductee; promoted the Houston, Texas territory of National Wrestling Alliance
13	1996		Bobo Brazil (Houston Harris)	Wrestling	Won the Detroit version of NWA United States Heavyweight Championship (9 times) and Mid-Atlantic version (1 time)
14	1996		Jack Brisco (Fred Brisco)	Wrestling	Won the NWA World Heavyweight Championship (2 times), NWA World Tag Team Championship (3 times), and NWA National Heavyweight Championship (1 time)
15	1996		Bruiser Brody (Frank Goodish)	Wrestling	Posthumous inductee; won the WCWA World Heavyweight Championship (3 times), NWA International Heavyweight Championship (3 times), and PWF World Tag Team Championship (1 time)
16	1996		Mildred Burke (Mildred Bliss)	Women's wrestling and promoting	Posthumous inductee; won the Women's World Championship (3 times) and NWA World Women's Championship (1 time); founded World Women's Wrestling Association.
17	1996		El Canek (Felipe Estrada)	Wrestling	Won the UWA World Heavyweight Championship (15 times), CMLL World Tag Team Championship (1 time) and CMLL World Trios Championship (1 time)
18	1996		Negro Casas (José Casas Ruiz)	Wrestling	Won the CMLL World Tag Team Championship (6 times), CMLL World Middleweight Championship (2 times), UWA World Lightweight Championship (1 time) and UWA World Middleweight Championship (1 time)
19	1996		Riki Choshu (Mitsuo Yoshida)	Wrestling	Won the PWF World Heavyweight Championship (1 time), IWGP Heavyweight Championship (3 times), and IWGP Tag Team Championship (3 times)
20	1996		Jim Cornette	Managing and promoting	Founded Smoky Mountain Wrestling and managed wrestlers in National Wrestling Alliance, World Championship Wrestling, and the World Wrestling Federation
21	1996		The Crusher (Reginald Lisowski)	Wrestling	Won the AWA World Heavyweight Championship (3 times), AWA World Tag Team Championship (9 times), and WWA World Tag Team Championship (6 times)
22	1996		Ted DiBiase	Wrestling and managing	Won the NWA/Mid-South North American Heavyweight Championship (5 times), PWF World Tag Team Championship (1 time), NWA National Heavyweight Championship (2 times), and WWF World Tag Team Championship (3 times); managed the Million Dollar Corporation and New World Order stables
23	1996		Dick the Bruiser (William Afflis)	Wrestling and promoting	Posthumous inductee; won the Indianapolis version (13 times) and the Los Angeles version (1 time) of the WWA World Heavyweight Championship, AWA World Heavyweight Championship (1 time) and AWA World Tag Team Championship (5 times); owned and promoted the World Wrestling Association in Indianapolis, Indiana
24	1996	—N/a	Alfonso Dantés (Jose Luis Amezcua Diaz)	Wrestling	Won the NWA World Light Heavyweight Championship (5 times), Mexican National Heavyweight Championship (2 times), and Mexican National Light Heavyweight Championship (3 times)
25	1996		The Dusek Family (Ernie, Emil, Joe, and Rudy) (The Hason Family)	Wrestling and promoting	Emil and Ernie Dusek won the Central States version of NWA World Tag Team Championship (3 times) and San Francisco version of NWA World Tag Team Championship (1 times); Joe Dusek promoted wrestling events in Omaha, Nebraska
26	1996		Dynamite Kid (Tom Billington)	Wrestling	Won the WWF Junior Heavyweight Championship (1 time), NWA International Junior Heavyweight Championship (1 time), All Asia Tag Team Championship (1 time), Stampede North American Heavyweight Championship (1 time), and WWF Tag Team Championship (1 time)
27	1996	—N/a	The Fabulous Kangaroos (Al Costello, Roy Heffernan, and Don Kent) (Giacoma Costa, Laurence Roy Heffernan, and Leo Smith Jr.)	Tag team wrestling	Won the Northeast version of the NWA United States Tag Team Championship (3 times) and Mid-America version of NWA World Tag Team Championship (3 times)
28	1996		Jackie Fargo (Henry Faggart)	Wrestling	Won the Mid-America version of the NWA World Tag Team Championship (10 times) and Mid-America version of NWA Southern Tag Team Championship (22 times)
29	1996		Ric Flair (Richard Fliehr) (Note: According to his autobiography, Flair does not know his actual birth name. His listed birth name was given to him upon his adoption as an infant.)	Wrestling	Won the WWF Championship (2 times), NWA World Heavyweight Championship (8 times), and WCW World Heavyweight Championship (6 times)
30	1996		Tatsumi Fujinami	Wrestling	Won the IWGP Heavyweight Championship (6 times), NWA World Heavyweight Championship (1 time), and WWF Junior Heavyweight Championship (1 time)
31	1996		Dory Funk	Wrestling and promoting	Posthumous inductee; won the NWA World Junior Heavyweight Championship (1 time) and NWA North American Heavyweight Championship multiple times; promoted for the National Wrestling Alliance
32	1996		Dory Funk Jr.	Wrestling	Won the NWA World Heavyweight Championship (1 time), NWA Mid-Atlantic Heavyweight Championship (2 times), and NWA Florida Heavyweight Championship (3 times)
33	1996		Terry Funk	Wrestling	Won the NWA World Heavyweight Championship (1 time), ECW World Heavyweight Championship (2 times), and WWF Tag Team Championship (1 time)
34	1996		Verne Gagne (LaVerne Gagne)	Wrestling and promoting	Founded the American Wrestling Association; won the AWA World Heavyweight Championship (10 times)
35	1996	—N/a	Cavernario Galindo (Rodolfo Galindo Ramírez)	Wrestling	Won the Mexican Light Heavyweight Championship (1 time); appeared in several luchador films
36	1996		Ed Don George	Wrestling	Posthumous inductee; won the World Heavyweight Wrestling Championship (1 time) and Boston's AWA World Heavyweight Championship (2 times)
37	1996		Gorgeous George (George Raymond Wagner)	Wrestling	Posthumous inductee; won the NWA Southern Heavyweight Championship (1 time), NWA Southeastern Heavyweight Championship (1 time), and Boston's AWA World Heavyweight Championship (1 time)
38	1996		Frank Gotch	Wrestling	Posthumous inductee; won the World Heavyweight Wrestling Championship (1 time) and American Heavyweight Championship (3 times)
39	1996	—N/a	Karl Gotch (Karl Istaz)	Wrestling	Won the IWA World Heavyweight Championship (1 time), WWWF World Tag Team Championship (1 time), and Ohio's AWA World Heavyweight Championship (1 time)
40	1996		"Superstar" Billy Graham (Wayne Coleman)	Wrestling	Won the WWWF World Heavyweight Championship (1 time) and San Francisco version of NWA World Tag Team Championship (2 times)
41	1996	—N/a	Eddie Graham (Edward Gossett)	Wrestling and promoting	Posthumous inductee; won the NWA World Tag Team Championship (7 times) and NWA United States Tag Team Championship (4 times); owned Championship Wrestling from Florida and served as president of National Wrestling Alliance
42	1996	—N/a	René Guajardo (Manuel Guajardo Mejorado)	Wrestling	Posthumous inductee; won the Mexican National Middleweight Championship (2 times), Mexican National Tag Team Championship (1 time), and the UWA World Middleweight Championship (2 times)
43	1996	—N/a	Gory Guerrero (Salvador Guerrero Quesada)	Wrestling and promoting	Posthumous inductee; won the NWA World Welterweight Championship (1 time), NWA World Middleweight Championship (1 time), and Mexican National Middleweight Championship (1 time)
44	1996		George Hackenschmidt	Wrestling	Posthumous inductee; won the European Greco-Roman Heavyweight Championship (1 time) and World Heavyweight Wrestling Championship (1 time)
45	1996		Stan Hansen (John Hansen)	Wrestling	Won the Triple Crown Heavyweight Championship (4 times) and AWA World Heavyweight Championship (1 time)
46	1996		Bret Hart	Wrestling	Won the WWF Championship (5 times), WWF Tag Team Championship (2 times), and WCW World Heavyweight Championship (2 times)
47	1996	—N/a	Stu Hart	Wrestling, promoting and training	Owned and promoted Stampede Wrestling; trained many well-known wrestlers
48	1996		Bobby Heenan (Raymond Heenan)	Managing and commentating	Managed wrestlers in the American Wrestling Association, Georgia Championship Wrestling, and World Wrestling Federation; provided color commentary for the World Wrestling Federation and World Championship Wrestling
49	1996		Danny Hodge	Wrestling	Won the NWA World Junior Heavyweight Championship (7 times)
50	1996		Hulk Hogan (Terry Bollea)	Wrestling	Won the WWF/E World Heavyweight Championship (6 times) and WCW World Heavyweight Championship (6 times)
51	1996		Antonio Inoki (Kanji Inoki)	Wrestling and promoting	Won the All Asia Tag Team Championship (3 times), NWA International Tag Team Championship (4 times), and IWGP Heavyweight Championship (1 time); founded New Japan Pro-Wrestling
52	1996	—N/a	Rayo de Jalisco (Maximino Linares Moreno)	Wrestling	Won the Mexican National Tag Team Championship (2 times) and appeared in luchador films
53	1996		Tom Jenkins	Wrestling	Posthumous inductee; won the American Heavyweight Championship (3 times)
54	1996	—N/a	Don Leo Jonathan (Don Heaton)	Wrestling	Won the NWA Canadian Tag Team Championship (15 times) and Omaha's World Heavyweight Championship (2 times)
55	1996		Gene Kiniski	Wrestling	Won the AWA World Heavyweight Championship (1 time), NWA World Heavyweight Championship (1 time), and WWA World Heavyweight Championship (1 time)
56	1996		Fred Kohler (Fred Koch)	Promoting	Posthumous inductee; promoted wrestling events in Chicago, Illinois and helped popularize tag team wrestling in the United States
57	1996		Killer Kowalski (Edward Spulnik)	Wrestling and training	Won the IWA World Heavyweight Championship (6 times) and WWWF World Tag Team Championship (1 time); trained many well-known wrestlers
58	1996		Ernie Ladd	Wrestling	Won the Mid-South North American Heavyweight Championship (4 times), WWA World Heavyweight Championship (1 time), and NWF Heavyweight Championship (1 time)
59	1996		Dick Lane	Commentating	Posthumous inductee; worked as commentator for wrestling shows in Southern California
60	1996		Jerry Lawler	Wrestling and promoting	Won the AWA World Heavyweight Championship (1 time), USWA Unified World Heavyweight Championship (27 times), and Memphis Wrestling Southern Heavyweight Championship (40 times)
61	1996		Ed Lewis (Robert Friedrich)	Wrestling	Posthumous inductee; won the World Heavyweight Wrestling Championship (4 times) and Boston version of the AWA World Heavyweight Championship (2 times)
62	1996		Jim Londos (Chris Theophelos)	Wrestling	Posthumous inductee; won the World Heavyweight Wrestling Championship (1 time) and NWA/NBA World Heavyweight Championship (1 time)
63	1996	—N/a	Salvador Lutteroth (Salvador Lutteroth Gonzalez)	Promoting	Posthumous inductee; founded Empresa Mexicana de la Lucha Libre
64	1996		Akira Maeda	Wrestling and promoting	Won the UWF Heavyweight Championship (1 time), European Heavyweight Championship (1 time), and IWGP Tag Team Championship (2 times); founded Fighting Network Rings and the Newborn Universal Wrestling Federation
65	1996	—N/a	Devil Masami (Masami Yoshida)	Women's wrestling	Won the WWWA World Single Championship (1 time), AAAW Single Championship (1 time), and WCW Women's Championship (1 time); trained several well-known wrestlers
66	1996		Mil Máscaras (Aaron Rodríguez)	Wrestling	Won the WWA/NWA Americas Heavyweight Championship (4 times), Mexican National Light Heavyweight Championship (2 times), and Georgia's IWA World Heavyweight Championship (1 time)
67	1996		Dump Matsumoto (Kaoru Matsumoto)	Women's wrestling	Won the AJW Championship (1 time) and WWWA World Tag Team Championship (2 times)
68	1996		Earl McCready	Wrestling	Posthumous inductee; won the NWA British Empire Heavyweight Championship (2 times)
69	1996		Leroy McGuirk	Wrestling and promoting	Posthumous inductee; won the NWA World Junior Heavyweight Championship (1 time) and World Light Heavyweight Championship (2 times); promoted shows for National Wrestling Alliance in Oklahoma
70	1996		Vince McMahon Sr.	Promoting	Posthumous inductee; founded the World Wide Wrestling Federation
71	1996		Vince McMahon Jr.	Promoting and commentating	Owned and provided commentary for the World Wrestling Federation
72	1996		Danny McShain	Wrestling	Posthumous inductee; won the World Light Heavyweight Championship (11 times) and NWA Texas Heavyweight Championship (9 times)
73	1996	—N/a	Ray Mendoza (Jose Diaz)	Wrestling	Won the NWA World Light Heavyweight Championship (6 times) and UWA World Light Heavyweight Championship (4 times)
74	1996		Mitsuharu Misawa	Wrestling	Won the Triple Crown Heavyweight Championship (5 times), GHC Heavyweight Championship (3 times), and World Tag Team Championship (6 times); founded Pro Wrestling Noah
75	1996	—N/a	Toots Mondt (Joseph Mondt)	Promoting	Posthumous inductee; invented "Slam Bang Western Style Wrestling", founded the Gold Dust Trio, and ran the World Wide Wrestling Federation
76	1996	—N/a	Sam Muchnick	Promoting	Founded the National Wrestling Alliance and served as its president from 1950 to 1960 and from 1963 to 1975; owned and promoted the St. Louis Wrestling Club
77	1996		Bronko Nagurski (Bronislau Nagurski)	Wrestling	Posthumous inductee; won the NWA/NBA World Heavyweight Championship (2 times), World Heavyweight Wrestling Championship (1 time)
78	1996		Pat O'Connor	Wrestling	Posthumous inductee; won the AWA World Heavyweight Championship (1 time) and NWA World Heavyweight Championship (1 time)
79	1996		Kintarō Ōki (Kim Tae-sik)	Wrestling	Won the WWA World Heavyweight Championship (1 time), All Asia Heavyweight Championship (4 times) and NWA International Heavyweight Championship (1 time)
80	1996		Atsushi Onita	Wrestling and promoting	Won the NWA International Junior Heavyweight Championship (3 times), All Asia Tag Team Championship (1 time), and FMW Brass Knuckles Heavyweight Championship (7 times); founded Frontier Martial-Arts Wrestling
81	1996		Pat Patterson (Pierre Clermont)	Wrestling	Won the San Francisco version of NWA World Tag Team Championship (11 times), AWA World Tag Team Championship (1 time), and WWF Intercontinental Championship (1 time)
82	1996	—N/a	Antonio Peña (Antonio Peña Herrada)	Promoting	Founded Asistencia Asesoría y Administración
83	1996	—N/a	John Pesek	Wrestling	Posthumous inductee; won the NWA/NBA World Heavyweight Championship (1 time)
84	1996		Roddy Piper (Roderick Toombs)	Wrestling	Won the NWA/WCW United States Heavyweight Championship (3 times) and WWF Intercontinental Championship (1 time)
85	1996		Harley Race	Wrestling	Won the NWA World Heavyweight Championship (8 times); founded World League Wrestling
86	1996		Dusty Rhodes (Virgil Runnels Jr.)	Wrestling	Won the NWA World Heavyweight Championship (3 times) and NWA Florida Heavyweight Championship (10 times)
87	1996		Rikidōzan (Kim Sin-Nak)	Wrestling and promoting	Posthumous inductee; won the NWA International Heavyweight Championship (1 time), Japanese Heavyweight Championship (1 time), All Asia Heavyweight Championship (1 time), NWA World Tag Team Championship (1 time), and All Asia Tag Team Championship (4 times); founded the Japanese Wrestling Association
88	1996		The Road Warriors (Hawk and Animal) (Michael Hegstrand and Joseph Laurinaitis)	Tag team wrestling	Won the AWA World Tag Team Championship (1 time), NWA World Tag Team Championship (1 time), and WWF Tag Team Championship (2 times)
89	1996		Yvon Robert	Wrestling	Posthumous inductee; won the NWA/NBA World Heavyweight Championship (1 time) and Boston's AWA World Heavyweight Championship (1 time)
90	1996		Billy Robinson	Wrestling	Won the PWF World Heavyweight Championship (1 time), IWA World Heavyweight Championship (1 time), European Heavyweight Championship (1 time), British Heavyweight Championship (1 time), AWA World Tag Team Championship (2 times), and AWA British Empire Heavyweight Championship (3 times)
91	1996		Antonino Rocca (Antonino Biasetton)	Wrestling	Posthumous inductee; won the Ohio version of the AWA World Heavyweight Championship (1 time), NWA North American Tag Team Championship (1 time) and WWWF International Heavyweight Championship (1 time)
92	1996		Buddy Rogers (Herman Rohde)	Wrestling	Posthumous inductee; won the NWA World Heavyweight Championship (1 time) and WWWF World Heavyweight Championship (1 time)
93	1996	—N/a	Lance Russell (Lanier Russell)	Commentating	Worked as commentator and ring announcer for wrestling shows in Memphis, and to a lesser extent, World Championship Wrestling and Smoky Mountain Wrestling
94	1996		Bruno Sammartino	Wrestling	Won the WWWF World Heavyweight Championship (2 times), WWWF United States Tag Team Championship (1 time), and WWA World Tag Team Championship (1 time)
95	1996	—N/a	Billy Sandow (Wilhelm Baumann)	Promoting and managing	Posthumous inductee; managed Ed "Strangler" Lewis and was part of the Gold Dust Trio
96	1996		El Santo (Rodolfo Guzmán Huerta)	Wrestling	Posthumous inductee; won the Mexican National Welterweight Championship (2 times), Mexican National Middleweight Championship (4 times), and Mexican National Light Heavyweight Championship (1 time); appeared in several luchador films
97	1996	—N/a	Jackie Sato (Naoko Sato)	Women's wrestling	Won the WWWA World Single Championship (2 times)
98	1996		Randy Savage (Randy Poffo)	Wrestling	Won the WWF Championship (2 times), WWF Intercontinental Championship (1 time), and WCW World Heavyweight Championship (4 times)
99	1996		The Sheik (Ed Farhat)	Wrestling and promoting	Won the Detroit Version of NWA United States Heavyweight Championship (12 times) and NWA Americas Heavyweight Championship (2 times); owned and promoted Big Time Wrestling
100	1996		Hisashi Shinma	Promoting	Chairman of New Japan Pro-Wrestling, founder of Japanese Universal Wrestling Federation and on-screen president of the World Wrestling Federation
101	1996		Dara Singh (Dara Singh Randhawa)	Wrestling	Won the World Wrestling Championship, NWA Canadian Open Tag Team Championship (1 time) and Commonwealth Championship.
102	1996		Gordon Solie (Francis Labiak)	Commentating	Worked as commentator for the National Wrestling Alliance and World Championship Wrestling
103	1996		El Solitario (Roberto González Cruz)	Wrestling	Won the NWA World Light Heavyweight Championship (1 time) and NWA World Middleweight Championship (1 time)
104	1996		Ricky Steamboat (Richard Blood)	Wrestling	Won the NWA/WCW United States Heavyweight Championship (4 times), NWA World Heavyweight Championship (1 time), and WWF Intercontinental Championship (1 time)
105	1996		Joe Stecher	Wrestling	Posthumous inductee; won the World Heavyweight Wrestling Championship (3 times)
106	1996		Tony Stecher (Anton Stecher)	Wrestling and promoting	Posthumous inductee; won several regional championships; co-founded the National Wrestling Alliance
107	1996	—N/a	Ray Steele (Peter Sauer)	Wrestling	Posthumous inductee; won the NWA/NBA World Heavyweight Championship (1 time)
108	1996		Ray Stevens (Carl Stevens)	Wrestling	Posthumous inductee; won the NWA United States Heavyweight Championship (San Francisco version) (2 times), the AWA World Tag Team Championship (4 times) and the AWA United States Heavyweight Championship (7 times)
109	1996		Nobuhiko Takada	Wrestling and promoting	Won the IWGP Heavyweight Championship (1 time), Pro-Wrestling World Heavyweight Championship (1 time), and IWGP Junior Heavyweight Championship (1 time); founded the Union of Wrestling Forces International
110	1996		Genichiro Tenryu (Genichiro Shimada)	Wrestling and promoting	Won the IWGP Heavyweight Championship (1 time), Triple Crown Heavyweight Championship (3 times), World Tag Team Championship (5 times); founded Wrestle Association R
111	1996		Lou Thesz (Aloysius Martiz Thesz)	Wrestling	Won the NWA World Heavyweight Championship (6 times)
112	1996		"Tiger Mask" Satoru Sayama	Wrestling, MMA and promoting	Won the WWF Junior Heavyweight Championship (2 times) and NWA World Junior Heavyweight Championship (2 times); founded Shooto
113	1996		Jumbo Tsuruta (Tomomi Tsuruta)	Wrestling	Won the Triple Crown Heavyweight Championship (3 times) and AWA World Heavyweight Championship (1 time)
114	1996	—N/a	Frank Tunney	Promoting	Posthumous inductee; promoted wrestling events in Toronto, Ontario and served as president of the National Wrestling Alliance
115	1996		Mad Dog Vachon	Wrestling	Won the AWA World Heavyweight Championship (5 times), AWA World Tag Team Championship (2 times), and Central States version of the NWA World Tag Team Championship (1 time)
116	1996		Big Van Vader (Leon White)	Wrestling	Won the IWGP Heavyweight Championship (3 times), Triple Crown Heavyweight Championship (2 times), WCW World Heavyweight Championship (3 times), and UWA World Heavyweight Championship (1 time)
117	1996		Johnny Valentine (Jonathan Wisniski)	Wrestling	Won the NWF Heavyweight Championship (2 times) and NWA/WWWF United States Tag Team Championship (4 times)
118	1996		Fritz Von Erich (Jack Adkisson)	Wrestling and promoting	Won the AWA World Heavyweight Championship (1 time) and NWA American Heavyweight Championship (13 times); served as president of the National Wrestling Alliance and founded World Class Championship Wrestling
119	1996		Whipper Billy Watson (William Potts)	Wrestling	Posthumous inductee; won the NWA/NBA World Heavyweight Championship (1 time), NWA World Heavyweight Championship (1 time) and NWA British Empire Heavyweight Championship (12 times)
120	1996		Bill Watts	Wrestling and promoting	Won the Mid-South North American Heavyweight Championship (8 times), AWA United States Heavyweight Championship (1 time) and WWWF United States Tag Team Championship (1 time); founded Mid-South Wrestling and served as president of World Championship Wrestling
121	1996		Jaguar Yokota (Rimi Yokota)	Women's wrestling	Won the UWA World Women's Championship (1 time), and WWWA World Single Championship (2 times)
122	1996		Stanislaus Zbyszko	Wrestling	Posthumous inductee; won the World Heavyweight Wrestling Championship (3 times)
123	1997		Édouard Carpentier (Edouard Wiercowicz)	Wrestling	Won the Boston's Atlantic Athletic Commission World Heavyweight Championship (1 time), Omaha's World Heavyweight Championship (1 time), and NAWA/WWA World Heavyweight Championship (2 times)
124	1997		El Hijo del Santo (Jorge Guzmán)	Wrestling	Won the AAA World Tag Team Championship (1 time), Mexican National Middleweight Championship (1 time), and Mexican National Welterweight Championship (1 time)
125	1997		Toshiaki Kawada	Wrestling	Won the Triple Crown Heavyweight Championship (5 times)
126	1997	—N/a	Jimmy Lennon	Ring announcing	Posthumous inductee; worked as a ring announcer in Los Angeles
127	1997		William Muldoon	Wrestling	Posthumous inductee; won American Greco-Roman Heavyweight Championship (1 time)
128	1997		Chigusa Nagayo	Women's wrestling	Founded Gaea Japan; won the AAAW Single Championship (2 times)
129	1998		Dos Caras (José Rodríguez)	Wrestling	Won the UWA World Heavyweight Championship (3 times), WWA World Heavyweight Championship (1 time), Mexican National Light Heavyweight Championship (1 time) and Mexican National Trios Championship (1 time)
130	1999		Lioness Asuka (Tomoko Kitamura)	Women's wrestling	Won the AJW Championship (2 times), WWWA World Single Championship (2 times), and AJW Junior Championship (1 time).
131	1999		Jushin Thunder Liger (Keiichi Yamada)	Wrestling	Won the IWGP Junior Heavyweight Championship (11 times), GHC Junior Heavyweight Championship (1 time), CMLL World Middleweight Championship (1 time), J-Crown (1 time), WCW Light Heavyweight Championship (1 time), and NWA World Junior Heavyweight Championship (2 times).
132	1999		Keiji Mutoh	Wrestling	Won the Triple Crown Heavyweight Championship (3 times) and IWGP Heavyweight Championship (4 times) and NWA World Heavyweight Championship (1 time)
133	1999		Jim Ross	Commentating	Worked as commentator for Universal Wrestling Federation, WCW, and WWF/E
134	2000		Stone Cold Steve Austin (Steven James Williams) (Note: Austin's actual birth name is Steven James Anderson. His name was changed to Williams in early childhood when he was adopted by his stepfather. He has since legally changed his name to Steve Austin.)	Wrestling	Won the WWF Championship (6 times), WWF Intercontinental Championship (2 times), and WCW United States Heavyweight Championship (2 times)
135	2000		Mick Foley	Wrestling	Won the WWF Championship (3 times) and TNA World Heavyweight Championship (1 time)
136	2000		Shinya Hashimoto	Wrestling	Won the NWA World Heavyweight Championship (1 time), IWGP Heavyweight Championship (3 times), and Triple Crown Heavyweight Championship (1 time)
137	2000		Akira Hokuto (Hisako Uno Sasaki)	Women's wrestling	Won the WCW Women's Championship (1 time), All Pacific Championship (2 times), and CMLL World Women's Championship (1 time)
138	2000	—N/a	Bill Longson	Wrestling	Posthumous inductee; won the NWA/NBA World Heavyweight Championship (3 times) and NWA Central States Heavyweight Championship (1 time)
139	2000		Frank Sexton	Wrestling	Won the Boston-based AWA World Heavyweight Champion (2 times)
140	2000		Sándor Szabó	Wrestling	Posthumous inductee; won the NWA/NBA World Heavyweight Championship (1 time) and Boston-based AWA World Heavyweight Championship (1 time)
141	2001	—N/a	Black Shadow (Alejandro Cruz Ortíz)	Wrestling	Won the Mexican National Tag Team Championship (1 time) and Mexican National Lightweight Championship (1 time)
142	2001	—N/a	Diablo Velasco (Cuahutémoc Velasco)	Training	Posthumous inductee; trained many well-known wrestlers
143	2001	—N/a	Lizmark (Juan Baños)	Wrestling	Won the Mexican National Light Heavyweight Championship (1 time), Mexican National Middleweight Championship (2 times), and Mexican National Welterweight Championship (1 time)
144	2001		Bull Nakano (Keiko Nakano)	Women's wrestling	Won the WWWA World Single Championship (1 time), All Pacific Championship (1 time), WWF Women's Championship (1 time) and CMLL World Women's Championship (1 time)
145	2001	—N/a	El Satánico (Daniel López)	Wrestling	Won the Mexican National Middleweight Championship (3 times) and Mexican National Trios Championship (3 times)
146	2002		Martin Burns	Wrestling and training	Posthumous inductee; won the American Heavyweight Championship (1 time); trained many well-known wrestlers
147	2002		Jack Curley (Jacques Armand Schuel)	Promoting	Posthumous inductee; promoted wrestling events and helped popularize professional wrestling in the United States
148	2002		Kenta Kobashi	Wrestling	Won the Triple Crown Heavyweight Championship (3 times) and GHC Heavyweight Championship (1 time)
149	2002		Wahoo McDaniel (Edward McDaniel)	Wrestling	Posthumous inductee; won the NWA United States Championship (5 times), NWA Mid-Atlantic Heavyweight Championship (5 times), and NWA National Heavyweight Championship (1 time)
150	2002		Manami Toyota	Women's wrestling	Won the WWWA World Single Championship (4 times), AAAW Single Championship (1 time) and All Pacific Championship (2 times)
151	2003		Chris Benoit	Wrestling	Won the World Heavyweight Championship (1 time), WCW World Heavyweight Championship (1 time), WWF/E Intercontinental Championship (4 times), and WWF/World Tag Team Championship (3 times)
152	2003		Earl Caddock	Wrestling	Posthumous inductee; won the World Heavyweight Wrestling Championship (1 time)
153	2003	—N/a	Francisco Flores	Promoting	Promoted wrestling events in Mexico; founded the Universal Wrestling Association
154	2003		Shawn Michaels (Michael Shawn Hickenbottom)	Wrestling	Won the WWF Championship (3 times), World Heavyweight Championship (1 time), WWF Intercontinental Championship (3 times), WWF European Championship (1 time) and WWF/World Tag Team Championship (5 times)
155	2004		The Undertaker (Mark Calaway)	Wrestling	Won the WWF/E Championship (4 times), World Heavyweight Championship (3 times), and WWF Tag Team Championship (6 times)
156	2004		Bob Backlund	Wrestling	Won the WWWF Heavyweight Championship/WWF Championship (2 times) and WWF Tag Team Championship (1 time)
157	2004		Masahiro Chono	Wrestling	Won the IWGP Heavyweight Championship (1 time), NWA World Heavyweight Championship (1 time), and IWGP Tag Team Championship (7 times)
158	2004	—N/a	Tarzán López (Carlos Lόpez Tovar)	Wrestling	Posthumous inductee; won the Mexican National Light Heavyweight Championship (3 times), Mexican National Middleweight Championship (1 time), and Mexican National Welterweight Championship (1 time)
159	2004		Kazushi Sakuraba	Wrestling and MMA	Competed in several professional wrestling organizations as well as in mixed martial arts fighting
160	2004		Último Dragón (Yoshihiro Asai)	Wrestling	Won the J-Crown (1 time), IWGP Junior Heavyweight Championship (2 times), AJPW World Junior Heavyweight Championship (2 times), and WCW Cruiserweight Championship (2 times)
161	2004		Kurt Angle	Wrestling	Won Olympic gold medal in men's freestyle wrestling, won the WWF/E Championship (4 times), WCW World Heavyweight Championship (1 time), World Heavyweight Championship (1 time) and TNA World Heavyweight Championship (6 times)
162	2005		The Fabulous Freebirds (Michael Hayes, Terry Gordy, and Buddy Roberts) (Michael Seitz, Terry Gordy, and Dale Hey)	Tag team wrestling	Won the WCWA World Six-Man Tag Team Championship/Texas version of the NWA World Six-Man Tag Team Championship (6 times) and WCW World Six-Man Tag Team Championship (1 time)
163	2005		Paul Heyman	Managing and promoting	Owned and promoted Extreme Championship Wrestling; managed wrestlers in American Wrestling Association, National Wrestling Alliance, World Championship Wrestling and WWE
164	2005		Triple H (Paul Levesque)	Wrestling	Won the WWF/E Championship (9 times), World Heavyweight Championship (5 times) WWF/E Intercontinental Championship (5 times), and WWF European Championship (2 times)
165	2006	—N/a	Paul Bowser	Promoting	Posthumous inductee; promoted Boston's American Wrestling Association
166	2006		Eddie Guerrero	Wrestling	Posthumous inductee; won the WWE Championship (1 time), WWF/E Intercontinental Championship (2 times), and WCW/WWE United States Championship (2 times)
167	2006		Hiroshi Hase	Wrestling	Won the IWGP Junior Heavyweight Championship (2 times) and IWGP Tag Team Championship (4 times) and WCW International World Heavyweight Championship (1 time)
168	2006		Masakatsu Funaki	Wrestling, MMA and promoting	Won the King of Pancrase Openweight Championship (2 times) and Triple Crown Heavyweight Championship (1 time); founded Pancrase Hybrid Wrestling
169	2006		Aja Kong (Erika Shishido)	Women's wrestling	Won the AAAW Single Championship (3 times), WWWA World Single Championship (2 times), and WWWA World Tag Team Championship (4 times)
170	2007		The Rock (Dwayne Johnson)	Wrestling	Won the WWF/E Championship (8 times), WCW/World Championship (2 times), WWF Intercontinental Championship (2 times), and WWF World Tag Team Championship (5 times)
171	2007		Evan Lewis	Wrestling	Posthumous inductee; won the American Heavyweight Championship (1 time)
172	2007	—N/a	Tom Packs	Promoting	Posthumous inductee; promoted wrestling events in St. Louis, Missouri and the Midwestern United States
173	2008	—N/a	Paco Alonso (Francisco Alonso)	Promoting	Promoted the Consejo Mundial de Lucha Libre
174	2008		Martín Karadagian	Wrestling and promoting	Posthumous inductee; competed in Argentina
175	2009		Konnan (Charles Ashenoff)	Wrestling	Won the CMLL World Heavyweight Championship (1 time), AAA Americas Heavyweight Championship (1 time), NWA World Tag Team Championship (2 times), WCW United States Heavyweight Championship (1 time), WCW World Tag Team Championship (2 times)
176	2009	—N/a	Everett Marshall	Wrestling	Won the MWA World Heavyweight Championship (1 time), NWA/NBA World Heavyweight Championship (1 time), Texas Heavyweight Championship (1 time)
177	2009		The Midnight Express (Bobby Eaton, Stan Lane, and Dennis Condrey)	Tag team wrestling	Won the NWA World Tag Team Championship (1 time), Mid-South Tag Team Championship (2 times), NWA American Tag Team Championship (1 time), NWA United States Tag Team Championship (3 times), and NWA World Tag Team Championship (1 time)
178	2009	—N/a	Bill Miller	Wrestling	Won the AWA United States Heavyweight Championship (1 time), AWA World Heavyweight Championship (1 time), WWWF United States Tag Team Championship (1 time)
179	2009		Masa Saito (Masanori Saito)	Wrestling	Won the AWA World Heavyweight Championship (1 time), NWA Florida Heavyweight Championship (1 time), WWF World Tag Team Championship (2 times)
180	2009	—N/a	Roy Shire (Roy Shropshire)	Wrestling and promoting	Won the Amarillo version of NWA North American Heavyweight Championship (1 time) and NWA Southwest Junior Heavyweight Championship (1 time); founded and promoted Big Time Wrestling in the Bay Area
181	2010		Chris Jericho (Christopher Irvine)	Wrestling	Won the Undisputed WWF Championship (1 time), World Heavyweight Championship (3 times), AEW World Championship (1 time), WCW/World Championship (2 times), ROH World Championship (2 times), and WWF/E Intercontinental Championship (9 times),
182	2010		Rey Mysterio Jr. (Oscar Gutierrez)	Wrestling	Won the World Heavyweight Championship (2 times), WWE Championship (1 time), and WCW/WWE Cruiserweight Championship (8 times)
183	2010		Wladek Zbyszko (Władysław Cyganiewicz)	Wrestling	Posthumous inductee. Won the Boston version of AWA World Heavyweight Championship (1 time)
184	2011	—N/a	Kent Walton	Commentating	Posthumous inductee. World of Sport commentator
185	2011		"Dr. Death" Steve Williams	Wrestling	Posthumous inductee. Won the Triple Crown Heavyweight Championship (1 time), UWF World Heavyweight Championship (1 time)
186	2011	—N/a	Curtis Iaukea	Wrestling	Posthumous inductee. Won the IWA World Heavyweight Championship (4 times), NWA Hawaii Heavyweight Championship (4 times), and WWWF World Tag Team Championship (1 time)
187	2012	—N/a	Mick McManus (William Matthews)	Wrestling	Won the European Middleweight Championship (4 times), British Welterweight Championship (2 times) and British Middleweight Championship (1 time)
188	2012	—N/a	Alfonso Morales (Gilberto Alberto Morales Villela)	Commentating	Commentator for both AAA and CMLL on Televisa
189	2012		John Cena	Wrestling	Won the WWE Championship/WWE World Heavyweight Championship (14 times), World Heavyweight Championship (3 times), WWE Intercontinental Championship (1 time), and WWE United States Championship (5 times)
190	2012		Hans Schmidt (Guy Larose)	Wrestling	Posthumous inductee. Won the Montreal version of AWA International Heavyweight Championship (2 times), Chicago version of NWA United States Heavyweight Championship (1 time), and Los Angeles version of NWA World Tag Team Championship (1 time)
191	2012		Lou Albano	Wrestling and managing	Posthumous inductee. Won the WWWF United States Tag Team Championship. Manager of 15 different WWF World Tag Team Champions
192	2012		Gus Sonnenberg	Wrestling	Posthumous inductee, Original World Heavyweight Championship (1 time), and Boston version of AWA World Heavyweight Championship (2 times)
193	2013	—N/a	Takashi Matsunaga	Promoting	Posthumous inductee. Founder and promoter of All Japan Women's Pro-Wrestling
194	2013		Henri Deglane	Wrestling	Posthumous inductee. Won Olympic gold medal in men's Greco-Roman wrestling, won the Boston version of the AWA World Heavyweight Championship
195	2013	—N/a	Dr. Wagner (Manuel González)	Wrestling	Posthumous inductee. Won the Mexican National Light Heavyweight Championship (3 times) and Mexican National Tag Team Championship (1 time). Patriarch of the Wagner wrestling family
196	2013		Atlantis	Wrestling	Won the CMLL World Light Heavyweight Championship (2 times), CMLL World Tag Team Championship (5 times), Mexican National Middleweight Championship (1 time), Mexican National Tag Team Championship (1 time), NWA World Light Heavyweight Championship (1 time) and NWA World Middleweight Championship (3 times)
197	2013		Kensuke Sasaki	Wrestling	Won the Triple Crown Heavyweight Championship (3 times), IWGP Heavyweight Championship (5 times), GHC Heavyweight Championship (1 time), IWGP Tag Team Championship (7 times), GHC Tag Team Championship (1 time) and WCW United States Heavyweight Championship (1 time)
198	2013		Hiroshi Tanahashi	Wrestling	Won the IWGP Heavyweight Championship (8 times), IWGP Tag Team Championship (2 times), IWGP Intercontinental Championship (2 times) and the IWGP United States Heavyweight Championship (3 times)
199	2014		The Rock 'n' Roll Express (Ricky Morton and Robert Gibson) (Richard Morton and Ruben Cain)	Tag team wrestling	Won the NWA World Tag Team Championship (5 times), the Mid-Atlantic version of the NWA World Tag Team Championship (4 times), SMW Tag Team Championship (10 times), and USWA World Tag Team Championship (2 times)
200	2014	—N/a	Ray Fabiani (Aurelio Fabiani)	Promoting	Posthumous inductee. Philadelphia promoter
201	2015		Brock Lesnar	Wrestling and MMA	Won the WWE Championship/WWE World Heavyweight Championship (7 times), WWE Universal Championship (3 times), IWGP Heavyweight Championship (1 time), and UFC Heavyweight Championship (1 time)
202	2015		Shinsuke Nakamura	Wrestling	Won the IWGP Heavyweight Championship (3 times), IWGP Intercontinental Championship (5 times), IWGP Tag Team Championship (1 time), NXT Championship (2 times), WWE United States Championship (2 times) and WWE Intercontinental Championship (1 time)
203	2015	—N/a	Perro Aguayo Jr. (Pedro Aguayo)	Wrestling	Posthumous inductee. Won the Mexican National Light Heavyweight Championship (1), Mexican National Tag Team Championship (3 times), CMLL World Trios Championship (1 time), and WWA Tag Team Championship (3 times)
204	2015		The Assassins (Jody Hamilton and Tom Renesto)	Tag team wrestling	Won the Florida version of NWA United States Tag Team Championship (2 times), NWA Georgia Tag Team Championship (12 times), Vancouver version of NWA World Tag Team Championship (1 time), and Mid-America version of NWA World Tag Team Championship (1 time)
205	2015		Ivan Koloff (Oreal Perras)	Wrestling	Won the WWWF World Heavyweight Championship (1 time), NWA Florida Tag Team Championship (5 times), NWA Georgia Tag Team Championship (7 times), NWA Mid-Atlantic Heavyweight Championship (4 times), NWA Mid-Atlantic Tag Team Championship (1 time), Mid-Atlantic version of NWA Television Championship (5 times), NWA United States Tag Team Championship (2 times), and the Mid-Atlantic version of the NWA World Tag Team Championship (5 times),
206	2015		Carlos Colón	Wrestling and promoting	Won the WWC World/Universal Heavyweight Championship (26 times), WWC Puerto Rico Heavyweight Championship (9 times), WWC North American Heavyweight Championship (8 times), WWC North American Tag Team Championship (11 times), WWC World Junior Heavyweight Championship (1 time), WWC World Tag Team Championship (3 times) and WWC World Television Championship (4 times)
207	2015	—N/a	Eddie Quinn (Edmund Quinn)	Promoting	Posthumous inductee; Montreal promoter
208	2016		Bryan Danielson	Wrestling	Won the World Heavyweight Championship (1 time), WWE Championship/WWE World Heavyweight Championship (4 times), AEW World Championship (1 time), and ROH World Championship (1 time).
209	2016		Gene Okerlund (Eugene Okerlund)	Commentating	Worked as interviewer and announcer for American Wrestling Association, World Wrestling Federation and World Championship Wrestling.
210	2016		Sting (Steve Borden)	Wrestling	Won the NWA World Heavyweight Championship (2 times), WCW World Heavyweight Championship (6 times), WCW International World Heavyweight Championship (2 times), WWA World Heavyweight Championship (1 time) and TNA World Heavyweight Championship (4 times).
211	2016		James McLaughlin	Wrestling	Posthumous inductee. Generally considered the first American professional wrestling champion.
212	2017		Mark Lewin	Wrestling	Won the IWA World Heavyweight Championship (2 times) and WWA World Heavyweight Championship (1 time).
213	2017		AJ Styles (Allen Jones)	Wrestling	Won the IWGP Heavyweight Championship (2 times), NWA World Heavyweight Championship (3 times), TNA World Heavyweight Championship (2 times), WWE Championship (2 times), WWE United States Championship (3 times) and WWE Intercontinental Championship (1 time).
214	2017	—N/a	The Sharpe Brothers (Ben and Mike)	Tag team wrestling	Posthumous inductees. Introduced modern professional wrestling to Japan. Won the San Francisco version (18 times) and the Chicago version (1 time) of the NWA World Tag Team Championship.
215	2017		Minoru Suzuki	Wrestling, MMA and promoting	Co-founder of Pancrase. Won the King of Pancrase Openweight Championship (1 time), Triple Crown Heavyweight Championship (2 times), GHC Heavyweight Championship (1 time), NEVER Openweight Championship (1 time), and the IWGP Intercontinental Championship (1 time).
216	2017		Pedro Morales	Wrestling	Won the WWA World Heavyweight Championship (2 times), WWC North American Heavyweight Championship (2 times) and WWWF World Heavyweight Championship (1 time).
217	2018		LA Park (Adolfo Tapia)	Wrestling	Won the IWC World Heavyweight Championship (1 time), the CMLL World Tag Team Championship (1 time) and MLW World Tag Team Championship (1 time)
218	2018	—N/a	Jerry Jarrett	Wrestling and promoting	Wrestler and promoter of Continental Wrestling Association, United States Wrestling Association and Total Nonstop Action Wrestling
219	2018		Jimmy Hart	Managing	Managed wrestlers in Continental Wrestling Association, World Wrestling Federation, and World Championship Wrestling
220	2018		Bill Apter	Journalism	Staff member for several magazines during the 1970s, 80s and 90s, notably Pro Wrestling Illustrated.
221	2018		Howard Finkel	Ring announcing	Announcer for the WWE since 1975, when it was known as the World Wide Wrestling Federation. He was the longest tenured employee of the organization.
222	2018		Gary Hart (Gary Williams)	Wrestling and managing	Posthumous inductee. Booker for World Class Championship Wrestling and longtime manager for several promotions
223	2018		Yuji Nagata	Wrestling	Won the IWGP Heavyweight Championship (2 times), GHC Heavyweight Championship (1 time), IWGP Tag Team Championship (2 times), and NEVER Openweight Championship (1 time)
224	2019		Último Guerrero (José Gutiérrez)	Wrestling	Won the CMLL World Heavyweight Championship (2 times), CMLL World Tag Team Championship (6 times), CMLL World Trios Championship (5 times), and CMLL World Light Heavyweight Championship (1 time)
225	2019		Villano III (Arturo Díaz)	Wrestling	Posthumous inductee. Won the UWA World Junior Heavyweight Championship (1 time), UWA World Junior Light Heavyweight Championship (1 time), UWA World Light Heavyweight Championship (2 times), UWA World Welterweight Championship (1 time), WWF Light Heavyweight Championship (7 times), CMLL World Light Heavyweight Championship (1 time), and Mexican National Trios Championship (1 time)
226	2019		Dr. Wagner Jr. (Juan Manuel González Barron)	Wrestling	Won the CMLL World Light Heavyweight Championship (2 times), CMLL World Tag Team Championship (4 times), CMLL World Trios Championship (4 times), AAA Mega Championship (3 times), UWA World Heavyweight Championship (1 time), UWA World Junior Heavyweight Championship (2 times), and WWA World Junior Light Heavyweight Championship (1 time)
227	2019	—N/a	Jim Crockett Sr.	Promoting	Posthumous inductee. Founder of Jim Crockett Promotions
228	2019		Gedo (Keiji Takayama)	Wrestling	Booker for New Japan Pro-Wrestling since 2010. Won the WAR International Junior Heavyweight Championship (2 times), IWGP Junior Heavyweight Tag Team Championship (4 times), and GHC Junior Heavyweight Tag Team Championship (1 time)
229	2019		Bearcat Wright (Edward Wright)	Wrestling	Posthumous inductee. First African American world wrestling champion. Won the WWA World Heavyweight Championship (1 time) and IWA World Heavyweight Championship (2 times)
230	2019		Paul Pons	Wrestling	Posthumous inductee. Early Greco-Roman wrestling pioneer. Won over 40 tournaments.
231	2019	—N/a	Los Misioneros de la Muerte (El Signo, El Texano, and Negro Navarro) (Antonio Sánchez, Juan Conrado Aguilar, and Miguel Calderón Navarro)	Tag team wrestling	Won the UWA World Trios Championship (6 times)
232	2020		Kenny Omega (Tyson Smith)	Wrestling	Won the IWGP Heavyweight Championship (1 time), IWGP Intercontinental Championship (1 time), IWGP United States Heavyweight Championship (2 times) AAA Mega Championship (1 time), AEW World Championship (2 times), AEW Tag Team Championship (1 time), AEW World Trios Championship (2 times), AEW International Championship (1 time) and Impact World Championship (1 time)Executive Vice President of All Elite Wrestling.
233	2020	—N/a	Médico Asesino (Cesáreo Manríquez González)	Wrestling	Posthumous inductee. Also known as El Medico in Texas. Won the Mexican National Heavyweight Championship (1 time), NWA Texas Heavyweight Championship (3 times), and NWA World Tag Team Championship (Texas version) (2 times). One of the first Luchadores to act in television and movies.
234	2020	—N/a	Karloff Lagarde (Carlos Lagarde)	Wrestling	Posthumous inductee. Won the Mexican National Welterweight Championship (1 time), NWA World Welterweight Championship (3 times), Mexican National Middleweight Championship (1 time), and Mexican National Tag Team Championship (1 time).
235	2020		Jun Akiyama	Wrestling	Won the GHC Heavyweight Championship (3 times) and Triple Crown Heavyweight Championship (2 times).
236	2020	—N/a	Dan Koloff (Doncho Danev)	Wrestling	Posthumous inductee. Won the European Heavyweight Championship (2 times).
237	2021		Kazuchika Okada	Wrestling	Won the IWGP World Heavyweight Championship (2 times), IWGP Heavyweight Championship (5 times), G1 Climax winner (3 times), New Japan Cup winner (2 times), AEW Continental Championship (1 time), AEW International Championship (2 times), AEW Unified Championship, and AEW World Trios Championship (1 time)
238	2021		Jim Crockett Jr.	Promoting	Posthumous inductee. Part owner of Jim Crockett Promotions 1973 to 1989. President of the National Wrestling Alliance four occasions
239	2021	—N/a	Los Brazos (Brazo de Oro, Brazo de Plata, and El Brazo)	Tag team wrestling	Posthumous inductees. Part of the Alvarado wrestling family
240	2021	—N/a	Don Owen	Promoting	Posthumous inductee. Owned and operated Pacific Northwest Wrestling for six decades.
241	2022	—N/a	Holy Demon Army (Toshiaki Kawada and Akira Taue)	Tag team wrestling	Won the AJPW World Tag Team Championship (6 times) and the World's Strongest Tag Determination League (2 times)
242	2022		Místico (Luis Ignacio Urive Alvirde)	Wrestling	Won the CMLL World Tag Team Championship (5 times), CMLL World Welterweight Championship (1 time), IWGP Junior Heavyweight Championship (1 time), Mexican National Light Heavyweight Championship (1 time), NWA World Historic Middleweight Championship (1 time), and NWA World Middleweight Championship (2 times)
243	2022		Kota Ibushi	Wrestling	Won the IWGP World Heavyweight Championship (1 time), IWGP Heavyweight Championship (1 time), IWGP Intercontinental Championship (2 times), IWGP Junior Heavyweight Championship (3 times), IWGP Junior Heavyweight Tag Team Championship (1 time), IWGP Tag Team Championship (1 time), NEVER Openweight Championship (1 time), and the G1 Climax (2 times)
244	2022		Tetsuya Naito	Wrestling	Won the IWGP Heavyweight Championship (3 times), IWGP Intercontinental Championship (6 times), IWGP Junior Heavyweight Tag Team Championship (1 time), IWGP Tag Team Championship (2 times), NEVER Openweight Championship (1 time), and the G1 Climax (2 times)
245	2022	—N/a	Los Villanos (Villano I, Villano II, Villano III, Villano IV, and Villano V) (José de Jesús Díaz Mendoza, José Alfredo Díaz Mendoza, Arturo Díaz Mendoza, Tomás Díaz Mendoza, Raymundo Díaz Mendoza Jr.)	Tag team wrestling	Villanos I, II, and III were posthumous inductees. Held numerous tag team, trios, and atómicos championships. Part of the Mendoza wrestling family.
246	2022		Mark Rocco (Mark Hussey)	Wrestling	Posthumous inductee. Won the WWF Junior Heavyweight Championship (1 time).
247	2022	—N/a	Lou Daro	Promoting	Posthumous inductee. Promoter in Los Angeles.
248	2022	—N/a	Johnny Doyle	Promoting	Posthumous inductee. Promoter and booking agent.
249	2023		Tomohiro Ishii	Wrestling	Won the IWGP Tag Team Championship (1 time), NEVER Openweight Championship (6 times), NEVER Openweight 6-Man Tag Team Championship (3 times), British Heavyweight Championship (2 times), and ROH World Television Championship (1 time)
250	2023		Sgt. Slaughter (Robert Remus)	Wrestling	Won the WWF Championship (1 time), and NWA United States Heavyweight Championship (3 times)
251	2023		Blue Panther (Genaro Nevarez)	Wrestling	Won the CMLL World Middleweight Championship (1 time), CMLL World Tag Team Championship (1 time), CMLL World Trios Championship (2 times), Mexican National Trios Championship (2 times), and Mexican National Middleweight Championship (2 times)
252	2023	—N/a	George Kidd	Wrestling	Posthumous inductee. First entrant into the Hall of Fame for Scotland.
253	2023		Jack Brisco and Jerry Brisco	Tag team wrestling	Jack Brisco is a posthumous inductee. Won the NWA Florida Tag Team Championship (8 times), NWA North American Tag Team Championship (Florida version) (2 times), NWA United States Tag Team Championship (Florida version) (5 times), NWA World Tag Team Championship (Mid-Atlantic version) (3 times), and NWA Georgia Tag Team Championship (2 times)
254	2023	—N/a	Beauty Pair (Jackie Sato and Maki Ueda)	Tag team wrestling	Jackie Sato is a posthumous inductee. Won the WWWA World Tag Team Championship (2 times)
255	2023	—N/a	Antonino Rocca and Miguel Pérez	Tag team wrestling	Posthumous inductees. Won the NWA World Tag Team Championship (Northeast version) (1 time), and WWC North American Tag Team Championship (1 time)
256	2024		Roman Reigns (Joe Anoa'i)	Wrestling	Won the WWE Championship (4 times), WWE Universal Championship (2 times), World Heavyweight Championship (1 time), WWE Intercontinental Championship (1 time) and WWE United States Championship (1 time)
257	2024		Shingo Takagi	Wrestling	Won the Open the Dream Gate Championship (4 times), Open the Twin Gate Championship (5 times), Open the Triangle Gate Championship (6 times), IWGP World Heavyweight Championship (1 time) and NEVER Openweight Championship (5 times)
258	2024		Paul Orndorff	Wrestling	Posthumous inductee. Won the Mid-South North American Heavyweight Championship (5 times), NWA National Heavyweight Championship (3 times) and AWA Southern Heavyweight Championship (1 time)
259	2024	—N/a	Johnny Rougeau	Wrestling	Posthumous inductee. Wrestling promoter in Montreal. Won the IWA International Heavyweight Championship (6 times), MAC World Heavyweight Championship (1 time) and All-Star Wrestling Heavyweight Championship (2 times)
260	2024		Young Bucks (Matt Jackson and Nick Jackson)	Tag team wrestling	Won the AEW World Tag Team Championship (4 times), AEW World Trios Championship (2 times), IWGP Junior Heavyweight Tag Team Championship (7 times), NEVER Openweight 6-Man Tag Team Championship (3 times), ROH World Tag Team Championship (3 times) and ROH World Six-Man Tag Team Championship (3 times). Co-founders and Executive Vice Presidents of All Elite Wrestling.
261	2024	—N/a	Los Hermanos Dinamita (Cien Caras, Máscara Año 2000 and Universo 2000)	Tag team wrestling	Won the Mexican National Trios Championship (1 time)
262	2024		Cima	Wrestling	Won the Open the Dream Gate Championship (3 times), Open the Brave Gate Championship (1 time), Open the Twin Gate Championship (5 times) and Open the Triangle Gate Championship (12 times)
263	2024		Johnny Saint	Wrestling	Won the British Lightweight Championship (1 time), European Lightweight Championship (2 times), and World Lightweight Championship (10 times)
264	2024	—N/a	Bobby Davis	Managing	Posthumous inductee. Influential wrestling manager
265	2025		Spiros Arion	Wrestling	Won the IWA World Heavyweight Championship (6 times), IWA World Tag Team Championship (2 times) and WWWF United States Tag Team Championship (3 times)
266	2025	—N/a	Gran Hamada	Wrestling, promoting and training	Posthumous inductee. Won the NWA World Middleweight Championship (1 time). Founded Universal Lucha Libre and trained numerous lucharesu wrestlers in Japan, including Último Dragón.
267	2025	—N/a	Dory Dixon	Wrestling	Won the NWA World Light Heavyweight Championship (1 time) and NWA Texas Heavyweight Championship (2 times)
268	2025		CM Punk (Phil Brooks)	Wrestling	Won the WWE Championship (3 times), World Heavyweight Championship (WWE, 2002–2013) (3 times), World Heavyweight Championship (WWE) (2 times), ECW World Heavyweight Championship (1 time), WWE Intercontinental Championship (1 time), AEW World Championship (2 times) and ROH World Championship (1 time)
269	2025		Cody Rhodes (Cody Runnels)	Wrestling	Won the Undisputed WWE Championship (3 times), WWE Universal Championship (1 time), WWE Intercontinental Championship (2 times), AEW TNT Championship (3 times), NWA World's Heavyweight Championship (1 time), IWGP United States Heavyweight Championship (1 time) and ROH World Championship (1 time). Co-founded All Elite Wrestling.
270	2025		Sabu (Terrance Brunk)	Wrestling	Posthumous inductee. Won the ECW World Heavyweight Championship (2 times), ECW World Television Championship (1 time), ECW World Tag Team Championship (3 times), NWA World Heavyweight Championship (1 time), IWGP Junior Heavyweight Championship (1 time), WWC Universal Heavyweight Championship (1 time) and WWL Extreme Championship (1 time).
271	2025	—N/a	Bobby Bruns	Training	Posthumous inductee. Trained many well-known wrestlers from Japan, including Rikidozan.
272	2025		Raoul Paoli	Promoting	Posthumous inductee. Co-founded the French Federation of Professional Wrestling
273	2026		Ted Turner (Robert Edward Turner III)	Promoting	Posthumous inductee. Founded World Championship Wrestling
274	2026		Dominic DeNucci (Domenico Nucciarone)	Wrestling and training	Posthumous inductee. Won the Australian version of the IWA World Heavyweight Championship (3 times), NWF World Heavyweight Championship (1 time), and WWWF World Tag Team Championship (2 times); trained several well-known wrestlers, including Mick Foley and Shane Douglas
275	2026		Jesse "The Body" Ventura (James Janos)	Wrestling and commentating	Won the NWA Pacific Northwest Heavyweight Championship (2 times), AWA Southern Heavyweight Championship (2 times), and the AWA World Tag Team Championship (1 time); provided commentary for matches in the World Wrestling Federation and World Championship Wrestling
276	2026	—N/a	George Gordienko	Wrestling	Posthumous inductee. Won the French version of the World Heavyweight Championship (1 time) and numerous versions of the British Commonwealth Heavyweight Championship
