= American Wrestling Alliance =

American Wrestling Alliance may refer to:

- American Wrestling Association, a defunct professional wrestling promotion headquartered in Minneapolis, Minnesota, United States
- American Wrestling Association, name used by professional wrestling promoter Paul Bowser for an alleged governing body responsible for sanctioning the AWA World Heavyweight Championship (Boston version)
- Big Time Wrestling (San Francisco), a defunct professional wrestling promotion headquartered in San Francisco, California, United States
