= Steve Casey =

Irish sport rower (1908–1987)

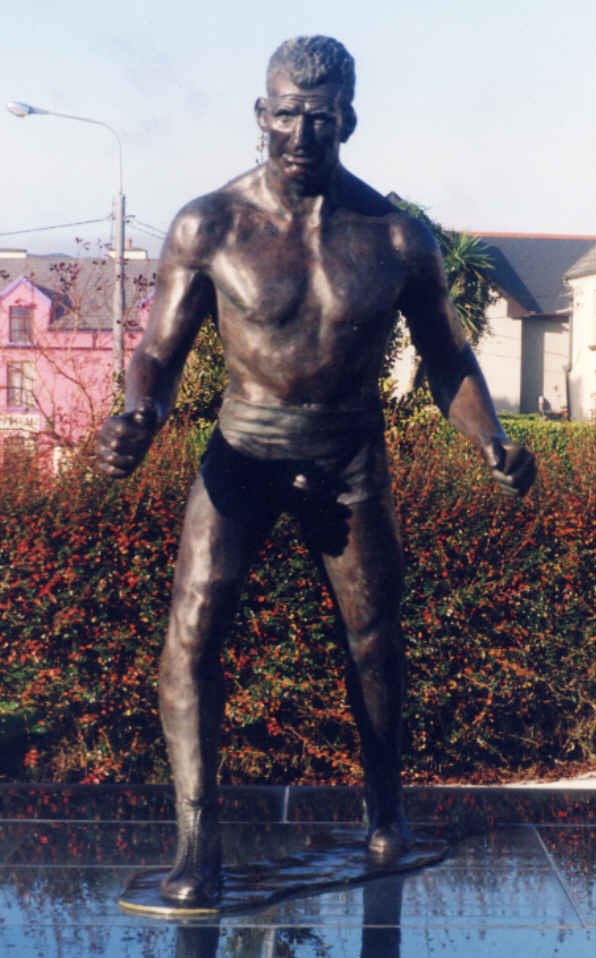
- Bronze statue of 'The Crusher' in Sneem

Personal information
- Born: Stephen Casey; 4 December 1908 Sneem, Ireland
- Died: 10 January 1987 (aged 78)

Professional wrestling career
- Ring name: Steve "Crusher" Casey
- Billed height: 6 ft 4 in (1.93 m)
- Billed weight: 238 lb (108 kg)
- Trained by: Mike Casey
- Debut: 3 March 1936
- Retired: 1951

Stephen Casey (4 December 1908 – 10 January 1987) was an Irish sport rower and world champion professional wrestler. He was the second Irish wrestler, after Danno O'Mahoney, to become a world champion.

== Rowing ==
Casey was the eldest of seven sons and three daughters of Mike Casey, a bare-knuckle boxer and Brigid (nee Sullivan). Steve Casey rowed in the Sneem senior crew with his father and the O'Connor Brothers. The Sneem/Casey Team won the Tug-O-War Munster Championship in 1932. Casey went on to win the Salter Challenge Cup with his brothers during 1930 to 1933. In 1936, he became the All-England Rowing Champion with his brothers Paddy, Tom and Mick. In the same year, the Caseys qualified for the Olympics in rowing but were disqualified for Steve and Paddy being professional wrestlers because Steve had wrestled two professional matches before the Olympics.

== Professional wrestling ==
In 1935, Steve and his brother Paddy Casey joined the British Amateur Wrestling Team. Steve Casey debuted as a professional wrestler on 3 March 1936 by beating the Irish Canadian Heavyweight Champion Paul Duveen in a non-title match. In October 1936, Boston promoter Paul Bowser brought Casey to the United States.

On 11 February 1938, he received the biggest victory of his career when he defeated the legendary Lou Thesz to win the Boston-based American Wrestling Association World Heavyweight Championship. On 26 August, he wrestled Danno O'Mahony to a draw after ten five-minute rounds in the European style. In September 1938, promoter Tom Packer switched recognition to National Wrestling Association champion Everett Marshall. In later years the similarly initialled National Wrestling Alliance asserted that Casey had been stripped of the original NWA title for being out of the country - this would be cited as an example of enforcement of the "thirty-day rule." He continued to be recognized as champion by theAmerican Wrestling Association. On 18 September, he beat O'Mahony in Munster in a finish match in 18 rounds and 97 minutes.

On 2 March 1939, Casey lost the AWA World Championship to Marvin Westenberg in Boston. On 29 March, he beat Gus Sonnenberg to start his second reign as AWA champion, losing the title to Ed Don George on 18 April in Albany, New York. He defeated George to start his third reign as AWA World Champion on 3 November 1939 at Broadway Auditorium, dropping the title to The French Angel on 13 May 1940. In the same year, he beat Richard Codman for the Governor's Cup in Cambridge, Massachusetts. He defeated the U.S. boxing champion Tiger Warrenton and issued a challenge to Joe Louis which went unanswered. On 12 November 1941, he challenged Earl McCready for the British Empire Heavyweight Championship but the match was fought to no contest.

On 13 May 1942, Casey beat French Angel for his fourth reign as AWA champion. While still champion, Casey joined the United States Army during World War II, serving from 1942 to 1944. On 6 June 1945 in Boston, he defeated Frank Sexton to start his sixth reign as AWA champion and re-lost the title to Sexton three weeks later. In 1947, he announced his retirement at age 38, but continued wrestling, and had his last bouts in 1951. He opened a liquor store near Nantasket Beach in Hull, Massachusetts. He also owned a bar on Massachusetts Ave., Boston in the 1950s.

== Personal life ==
In 1983, the Casey family organized a family reunion in Sneem, Ireland. On 10 January 1987, he died at age 78.

== Legacy ==
The name "Steve Casey" - or close variations - was subsequently used by a variety of other wrestlers. These have included Steve Casey (alias Steve McHoy), the son of Black Angus Campbell, in both Britain and America in the early 1980s, fellow British wrestler Steve Casey from Lincolnshire (born Paul Rudderham) and also Steven Casey, a wrestler signed to WCW circa 1989, who later wrestled for the company as Steve Dane.

== Championships and accomplishments ==
In 1982, Casey was awarded the Irish Hall of Fame award by 1956 Olympic Gold Medalist Ronnie Delaney.

=== Sport rowing ===
- Tug O' War Munster Championship (1932)
- All-England Rowing Championship (1936)

=== Professional wrestling ===
- Midwest Wrestling Association
  - MWA World Heavyweight Championship (Ohio version) (1 time)
- American Wrestling Association (Boston)
  - AWA World Heavyweight Championship (6 times)
- Fédération Française de Catch Professionnel
  - World Heavyweight Championship (French version) (1 time)
- Other titles
  - Governor's Cup (1940)
