= Ruffy Silverstein =

Ruffy Silverstein may refer to:

- Ruffy Silverstein (American wrestler) (1914–1980)
- Ruffy Silverstein (Canadian wrestler) (born 1972)
