= Chief Don Eagle =

Mohawk boxer (1925–1966)

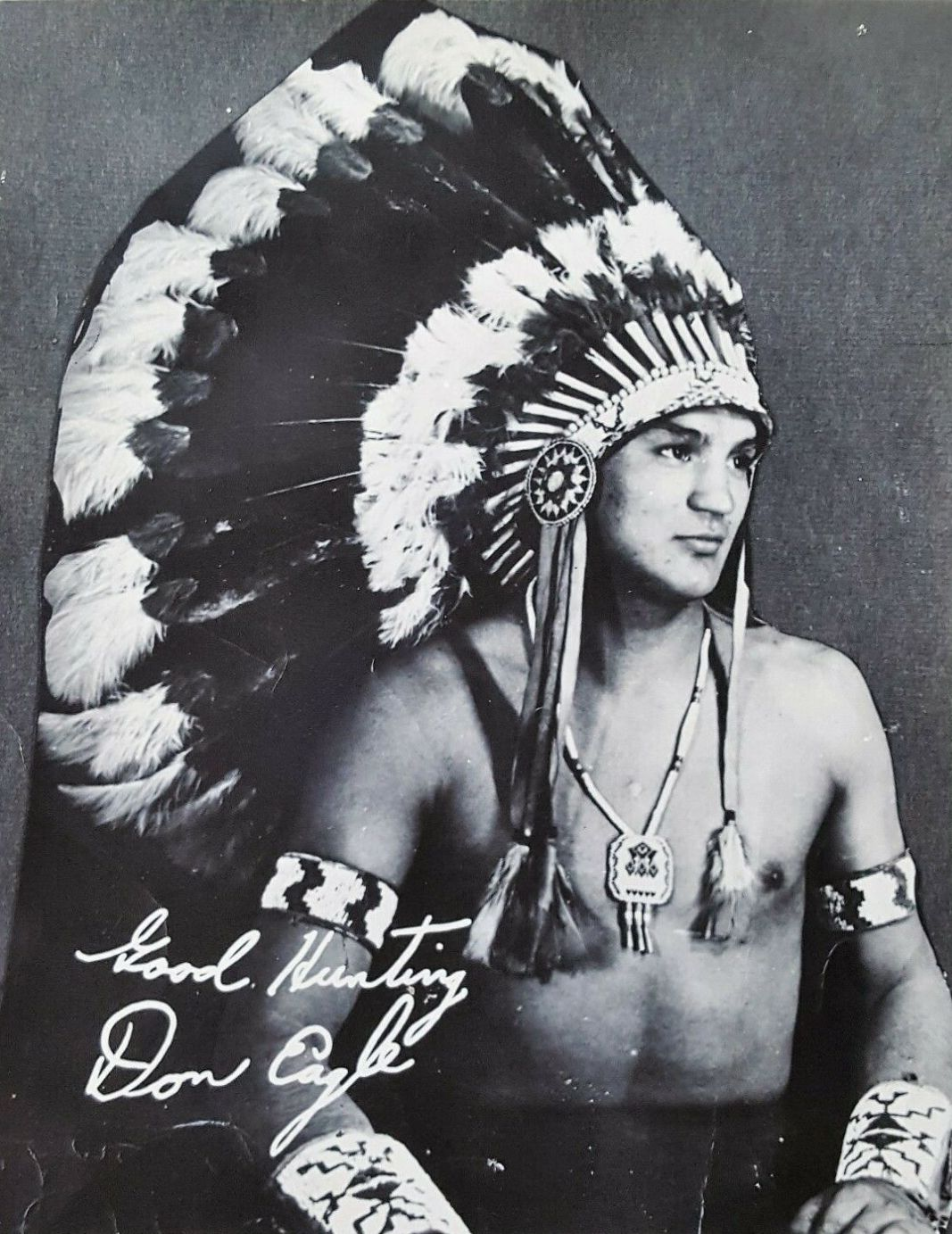

Personal information
- Nicknames: Don Eagle; Chief Don Eagle; CD Eagle; Chicken Hawk Eagle; War Eagle
- Nationality: American
- Born: Carl Donald Bell; August 25, 1925 Kahnawake, Quebec, Canada
- Died: March 17, 1966 (aged 40) Kahnawake, Quebec, Canada
- Height: 6 ft 1 in (185 cm)
- Weight: Heavyweight

Boxing career
- Stance: Orthodox

Boxing record
- Total fights: 20
- Wins: 16
- Win by KO: 10
- Losses: 4
Medal record
Men's amateur boxing
Representing United States
Cleveland Golden Gloves
Gold medal – first place	1945 Cleveland	Heavyweight

Carl Donald Bell (August 25, 1925 – March 17, 1966), also known by his ring name Chief Don Eagle, was a Canadian Mohawk boxer and professional wrestler during the 1950s and 1960s. Originally from Kahnawake, Quebec, he became Boston's AWA World Heavyweight Champion in 1950.

== Professional wrestling career ==
Eagle began a professional wrestling career in 1945, after a brief time working in the steel and construction industry. He was trained by his father, Chief Joseph War Eagle. In his first year, Eagle competed in 22 matches and won 17. He defeated the established Red Dawson with a frog splash in just under 16 minutes. During the peak of his career in the early 1950s, Eagle became the first person to throw Primo Carnera off his feet in a wrestling match. He wrestled Antonino Rocca to a 60-minute draw on May 19, 1951, at Chicago Stadium.

=== Controversy over AWA World Title (Boston) ===
On May 23, 1950, Eagle defeated Frank Sexton in a best-of-three falls. Sexton was just over a year into a near-four-year reign of the Boston version of the AWA World Heavyweight Championship.

Three days later, Eagle appeared on television without the championship belt to face Gorgeous George in another best-of-three falls match in the Chicago area. Eagle won the first fall by submission, but referee Earl Mullihan counted him out in the second. In the deciding fall, George caught Eagle in a backyard entry cradle. Although Mullihan could clearly see that one of Eagle's shoulders was off the mat, he administered a rapid three-count and awarded the match to George.

The controversial finish enraged the crowd, who began rioting by throwing dangerous objects into the ring. Eagle responded by striking Mullihan with a powerful punch as the referee hurried out of the ring and toward the exit. As Mullihan ran up the aisle, Eagle hit him again between the shoulder blades. The Illinois State Athletic Commission subsequently suspended Eagle for assaulting a referee.

Despite the suspension, Eagle regained the championship on August 31, 1950. However, the title was declared vacant in November due to his inactivity following an injury and was subsequently replaced by the AWA Eastern Heavyweight Championship.

=== Later career ===
During a 1953 match with the faux-Nazi Hans Schmidt, Eagle was thrown over the top rope and into the ringside chairs, damaging several spinal discs and breaking two ribs. Eagle took a year off to recover from his injuries, during which time he began training a teenage Billy Two Rivers. Eagle gave Two Rivers a further year's training after he himself had returned to wrestling, occasionally tagging with the young wrestler. He would wrestle for American Wrestling Association (Minnesota) in 1960 when the promotion first started. Due to continuing back problems, Eagle became semi-retired and wrestled infrequently in various regions over the next three years. Eagle decided to retire permanently in 1965 at the age of 39.

== Death ==
The Xenia Daily Gazette reported that Eagle was found dead at his home near Montreal on March 17, 1966, with a .32 caliber revolver found near his body. Contemporaneous newspaper reports indicated he had been despondent over some construction project setbacks: namely, a Logan County (Ohio) Indian village, an expansion program in the Zane Shawnee Caverns, and a $12 million Indian Center near Montreal. Those close to Eagle, including Billy Two Rivers, do not believe his death was a suicide. Skeptics noted it could have been a murder, connected to the death of his wife, Jean Eagle.

== Championships and accomplishments ==
=== Boxing ===
- Cleveland Golden Gloves Heavyweight Championship (1945)

=== Professional wrestling ===
- American Wrestling Association (Boston)
  - AWA World Heavyweight Championship (2 times)
- Canadian Wrestling Hall of Fame
  - Class of 2016
- Fred Kohler Enterprises
  - World Heavyweight Championship (Illinois version)
- Midwest Wrestling Association (Ohio)
  - MWA World Heavyweight Championship (Ohio version) (1 time)

== Professional boxing record ==
20 fights	16 wins	4 losses
By knockout	10	1
By decision	6	2
By disqualification	0	1
Draws	0	

No.	Result	Record	Opponent	Type	Round, time	Date	Location	Notes
20	Loss	16–4	(United States) Richard Hagan	KO	4 (8)	9 Aug 1948	(United States) Marigold Gardens, Chicago, Illinois, U.S.	
19	Win	16–3	(United States) Henry Jones	PTS	6	13 Jul 1948	(United States) Marigold Gardens Outdoor Arena, Chicago, Illinois, U.S.	
18	Win	15–3	(United States) Johnny Flanagan	KO	2 (6)	10 May 1948	(United States) Marigold Gardens, Chicago, Illinois, U.S.	
17	Win	14–3	(United States) Al Hunter	TKO	3 (6)	16 Apr 1948	(United States) Marigold Gardens, Chicago, Illinois, U.S.	
16	Win	13–3	(United States) Lenny Johnson	TKO	2 (6)	19 Apr 1948	(United States) Marigold Gardens, Chicago, Illinois, U.S.	
15	Loss	12–3	(United States) Ocie Talbert	PTS	6	29 Jan 1948	(United States) Coliseum Annex, Chicago, Illinois, U.S.	
14	Win	12–2	(United States) Al Timmons	PTS	6	13 Jan 1948	(United States) Coliseum Annex, Chicago, Illinois, U.S.	
13	Win	11–2	(United States) Lonnie Morris	PTS	4	6 Jan 1948	(United States) Coliseum Annex, Chicago, Illinois, U.S.	
12	Win	10–2	(United States) James Turner	PTS	6	30 Dec 1947	(United States) Kalamazoo, Michigan, U.S.	
11	Win	9–2	(United States) George Brown	KO	2 (4), 1:18	25 Nov 1947	(United States) Coliseum Annex, Chicago, Illinois, U.S.	
10	Loss	8–2	(United States) Jackie Thompson	DQ	1	21 Nov 1947	(United States) Minneapolis Auditorium, Minneapolis, Minnesota, U.S.	
9	Win	8–1	(United States) Bobby Marshall	TKO	2 (4)	31 Oct 1947	(United States) Minneapolis Auditorium, Minneapolis, Minnesota, U.S.	
8	Win	7–1	(United States) Chief War Cloud	PTS	4	28 Oct 1947	(United States) Coliseum Annex, Chicago, Illinois, U.S.	
7	Win	6–1	(United States) Joe Connors	KO	2 (4)	22 Oct 1947	(United States) Coliseum Annex, Chicago, Illinois, U.S.	
6	Win	5–1	(United States) Jacques Carter	KO	2 (4)	15 Oct 1947	(United States) Coliseum Annex, Chicago, Illinois, U.S.	
5	Loss	4–1	(United States) Gibbs Pike	TKO	5 (6), 0:54	29 Aug 1947	(United States) Jefferson County Armory, Louisville, Kentucky, U.S.	
4	Win	4–0	(United States) Al Small	PTS	4	25 Aug 1947	(United States) Marigold Gardens Outdoor Arena, Chicago, Illinois, U.S.	
3	Win	3–0	(United States) Larry Chatman	KO	2 (4)	28 Jul 1947	(United States) Marigold Gardens Outdoor Arena, Chicago, Illinois, U.S.	
2	Win	2–0	(United States) Len Billingsley	KO	1 (4)	21 Jul 1947	(United States) Marigold Gardens, Chicago, Illinois, U.S.	
1	Win	1–0	(United States) Herb Jones	KO	2 (4)	27 Jan 1947	(United States) Jefferson County Armory, Louisville, Kentucky, U.S.	

== See also ==
- List of premature professional wrestling deaths
