= Sándor Szabó (wrestler) =

Hungarian-American professional wrestler (1906–1966)

Sandor Szabo
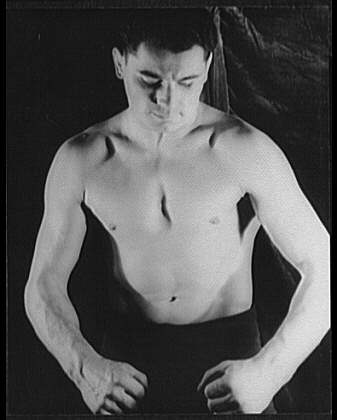
- Szabó in 1933; Photo by Carl Van Vechten

Personal information
- Born: January 4, 1906 Košice, Austro-Hungarian Empire (now Slovakia)
- Died: October 16, 1966 (aged 60) Los Angeles, California, U.S.

Professional wrestling career
- Debut: 1930
- Retired: 1963

Sándor Szabó (January 4, 1906 – October 16, 1966) was a Hungarian-born professional wrestler who emigrated to America.

At first, due to his large size, he was promoted by Jack Pfefer and Jack Curley of New York City as a "freak talent", one of a number of foreign and extraordinary wrestlers booked to attract the curious. In the early 1940s, Szabo held three world championships. In the 1950s, he was quite popular in Southern California, where he was assistant booker to Jules Strongbow, and held tag team championships in Los Angeles and San Francisco. He also recorded a song in 1953 for Hammerlock Records entitled "Take Me in Your Arms". He wrestled his last match in 1963. In 2000, he was inducted into the Wrestling Observer Newsletter Hall of Fame. He died of a heart attack at the age of 60.

== Championships and accomplishments ==
- 50th State Big Time Wrestling
  - NWA Hawaii Heavyweight Championship (2 times)
- American Wrestling Association
  - AWA World Heavyweight Championship (1 time)
- California State Athletic Commission
  - World Heavyweight Championship (Los Angeles version) (1 time)
- Montreal Athletic Commission
  - World Heavyweight Championship (Montreal version) (1 time)
- NWA Hollywood Wrestling
  - NWA "Beat the Champ" Television Championship (8 times)
  - WWA International Television Tag Team Championship (7 times) - with Wilbur Snyder (2), Bobo Brazil (1), Gene Stanlee (1), Billy Darnell (1) and Edouard Carpentier (2)
  - NWA World Tag Team Championship (Los Angeles version) (1 time) - with Billy Darnell
- NWA San Francisco
  - NWA World Tag Team Championship (San Francisco version) (2 times) - with Primo Carnera (1) and Ron Etchison (1)
- National Wrestling Association
  - NWA World Heavyweight Championship (1 time)
- Professional Wrestling Hall of Fame and Museum
  - Class of 2013
- Wrestling Observer Newsletter awards
  - Wrestling Observer Newsletter Hall of Fame (Class of 2000)
