= Paul Bowser =

American professional wrestling promoter (1886–1960)

- Born: Paul Forbes Bowser; May 28, 1886; Kittanning, Pennsylvania, U.S.
- Died: July 17, 1960 (aged 74); Boston, Massachusetts, U.S.
- Education: Beaver College
- Occupations: Promoter; wrestler
- Years active: 1907–1960
- Organization: American Wrestling Association (Boston)

Paul Forbes Bowser (May 28, 1886 – July 17, 1960) was an American professional wrestler and promoter who was active from the 1920s to the 1950s in the Boston area.

He founded the Boston-based American Wrestling Association and later a member of the National Wrestling Alliance. The careers of eventual world champions Gus Sonnenberg, Ed Don George, Danno O'Mahony and Steve Casey were started under Bowser's direction. Others that Bowser has been credited for giving their first breaks in wrestling were Maurice Vachon and The Fabulous Moolah

Bowser is a member of the Professional Wrestling Hall of Fame and Museum and Wrestling Observer Newsletter Hall of Fame.

== Early life ==
Paul Forbes Bowser was born on May 28, 1886 in Kittanning, Pennsylvania to Armstrong County, Pennsylvania teacher, school superintendent and farmer Marlin Bowser and Nancy Arreta "Arreta" (Hawkins) Bowser. The Bowsers grew fruits and vegetables on their farm along with raising standardbred horses, which would become a lifelong hobby and business venture for Paul. Paul studied law at the co-educational Beaver College, leaving in 1907 prior to receiving a degree when the college limited enrollment to female students. While in school, Paul played football at the local YMCA with Hube Wagner.

== Professional wrestling career ==
=== Wrestler ===
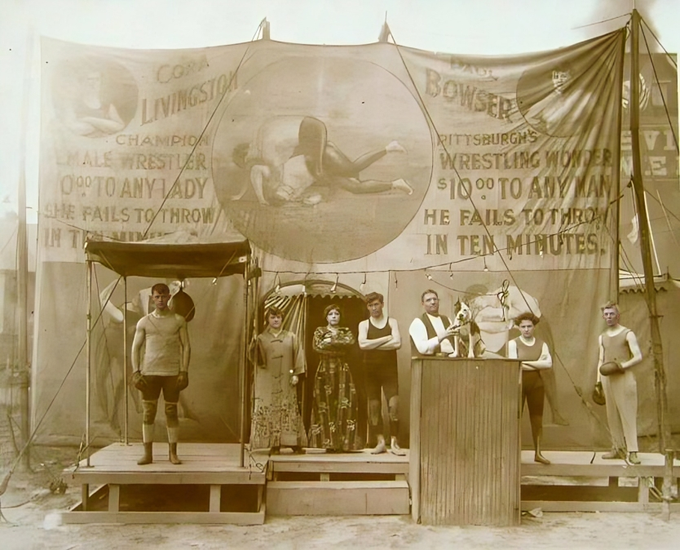
Wrestlers Cora Livingston and Paul Bowser Take On All Comers

At 18 years old Bowser began amateur wrestling, becoming a professional upon leaving college in 1907. Bowser toured the vaudeville circuit as a middleweight, taking on all comers and offering $25 to any man he couldn't throw within 15 minutes. In 1911 he met women's wrestling champion Cora Livingston when they shared the bill at the Academy Theater in Pittsburgh, the pair later married in 1913. He moved to Newark, Ohio in 1912, opening a wrestling school and began to promote wrestling shows, often working as a referee. Bowser and Livingston toured with the Polack Brothers Circus in 1917 and 1918.

On March 10, 1916, Bowser became world middleweight champion, defeating Joe Turner in Newark. In November 1919, he and a co-defendant were successfully sued by Kelton Mitchell, who claimed he had been conned out of $2,300 that was bet on a fixed wrestling match in 1917.

Bowser moved to Boston in 1922, running shows against the area's established promoter, George V. Tuohey. Within a year, Bowser had won the promotional war and Tuohey filed for bankruptcy. In Boston, on January 3, 1922, Bowser again won the middleweight title from Joe Turner in a show promoted at the Grand Opera House. He retired as a wrestler the following year.

=== Promoter ===
Bowser (right) clowning around with Yukon Eric and Jack Sharkey.

As a promoter, Bowser was initially allied with Billy Sandow and Ed "Strangler" Lewis and took on entrenched rival, New York-based Jack Curley. On January 25, 1923, Curley-backed Nat Pendleton was defeated in a real contest by Bowser's John Pesek, taking two falls in under 45 minutes. Curley would get his revenge two years later, paying Stanislaus Zbyszko to go against plans and defeat Sandow/Lewis/Bowser-backed world champion Wayne Munn in Philadelphia. On March 11, 1926, Bowser planned to regain control of the title by having Joe Malcewicz ambush champion Joe Stecher (who had won the title from Zbyszko and was also aligned with Curley)—who was expecting to wrestle a different opponent. But the plan failed when Stecher just walked out of the ring and left before the match started.

In 1928 Bowser put his promotional efforts behind Gus Sonnenberg, an NFL football player for the Providence Steam Roller. Sonnenberg and his flying tackle became a sensation in professional wrestling. On a Bowser-promoted January 4, 1929 card at the Boston Garden, Sonnenberg became the world heavyweight champion by defeating Strangler Lewis. Sonnenberg became the biggest draw in professional wrestling, although he would soon be eclipsed by Jim Londos, wrestling's biggest star during the Great Depression. Sonnenberg consistently drew big crowds in Los Angeles for promoter Lou Daro—part of the Bowser camp. His popularity also led Bowser-aligned Ivan Mickailoff to introduce weekly wrestling shows to Toronto in 1929, largely using Bowser's wrestlers. Several state athletic commissions stripped Sonnenberg of recognition as world champion after it was deemed that he had not faced worthy challengers, splintering the world title picture in July 1929. Bowser continued to recognize Sonnenberg and in 1931 branded his organization as the American Wrestling Association, a name which had been in use in Massachusetts as early as 1919.

Bowser recruited amateur wrestling standout Ed Don George in 1930, who was immediately put in main events and on December 10, 1930 defeated Sonnenberg for the world title in Los Angeles. Lewis, who felt he had been promised that he would be the one to get the title back from Sonnenberg, defeated George for the belt on April 13, 1931, in Los Angeles, against Bowser's wishes. But Bowser quickly regained control of the title when on May 4, 1931, in Montreal, Lewis was disqualified for biting his opponent, Henri DeGlane, who was declared the new champion. The suspicion at the time was that the bite marks were actually inflicted by DeGlane himself or one of his cornermen, and that he pretended to have been bitten by Lewis to win the match, although it was never confirmed.

During the promotional wars of the 1930s, Toots Mondt and Ray Fabiani, supported by Curley, began presenting shows in Boston in opposition to Bowser, running their first event on January 27, 1932, with Lewis in the main event. But after Londos broke away from Curley, peace was made between Bowser and Curley in the summer of 1932. In 1933, Bowser backed Jim Browning, who defeated Lewis in New York for recognition there as world champion, with Bowser reportedly paying $42,000 to Lewis and Mondt to drop the title. In November 1933, Bowser signed an agreement with Curley, Mondt, Fabiani, Ed White and Tom Packs, under which the six promoters agreed to share talent and profits.

Bowser's next star creation was Danno O'Mahony, who unified the New York and Boston versions of the world title by defeating Londos in June 1935 for the New York State Athletic Commission World Heavyweight Championship at Fenway Park, and the following month at Braves Field by beating George for the AWA title. O'Mahony was not a skilled wrestler and promoters who had not been shut out of the Curley-Bowser alliance took advantage of that weakness, arranging for Dick Shikat to win the title in a double-cross on March 2, 1936 in New York. The "Curley Trust" began to fall apart after Shikat's victory, with Fabiani eventually running in opposition to Curley.

Later in 1936, Bowser made Steve "Crusher" Casey his top star, and Casey rose to become world champion with a victory over Lou Thesz in Boston on February 11, 1938. Bowser brought Maurice Tillet to the U.S. in 1940, and he became the largest draw in professional wrestling and defeated Casey for the AWA World Heavyweight title on May 13, 1940. Casey regained the title two years later and served in the United States Army during World War II and returned to wrestling for Bowser in Boston in 1945, dropping the title to Bowser's next major star, Frank Sexton.

Bowser did not initially join the National Wrestling Alliance when it formed in 1948, but considered himself to be a friend of the organization and sent the NWA a check for initiation fees. Bowser joined the group the following year in 1949, and was an NWA member until 1957. In 1952, as a concession to the NWA, Bowser renamed his world title the Eastern Heavyweight Championship. Verne Gagne became a top draw for Bowser in the early 1950s. During this time, former associate Tony Santos began promoting shows with non-Bowser talent in areas formerly served by Bowser's Boston booking office, including Holyoke, Massachusetts, Springfield, Massachusetts, Chicopee, Massachusetts and Concord, New Hampshire.

In the late 1950s, Bowser left the NWA and formed the Atlantic Athletic Corporation in Boston with Eddie Quinn and Johnny Doyle, the latter handling all booking responsibilities at the Boston wrestling office. The AAC World title was created after Killer Kowalski defeated Edouard Carpentier, who had been recognized in Boston and some NWA areas as world champion. Doyle left to go into partnership with Jim Barnett in 1959 and Quinn started running cards in opposition to Bowser in 1960. Bowser ran what would be his last show on July 15, 1960, at the Boston Garden. He had suffered a heart attack three days earlier and died on July 17 following surgery at Massachusetts General Hospital at age 74.

== Bay State Raceway ==
An avid enthusiast of standardbred horses and harness racing, in 1947 Bowser co-founded the Bay State Raceway in Foxborough, Massachusetts. The harness racing track would later play a major role in the history of the New England Patriots. In 1970, raceway land was donated to Patriots owner Billy Sullivan in order to construct a stadium and keep the Patriots in Greater Boston. The track and surrounding land would later be purchased by Robert Kraft as leverage to buy the team. Gillette Stadium was later built on the site of the raceway beginning in 2000.

== Personal life ==
Bowser married Beryle (or Beryl) Bittner on May 27, 1911 in Monaca, Pennsylvania. He later married women's wrestling champion Cora Livingston in 1913 and were together until her death in 1957.

In his years as a wrestling promoter, the nicknames bestowed on him by newspaper columnists were Oom Paul (Pennsylvania Dutch for Uncle Paul) in addition to the more frequently-used Papa Paul.

Bowser was a resident of Lexington, Massachusetts. He owned a 30 acre estate called Fair Oaks Farm which included race horses, stables and a half-mile trotting track, much of which sold at auction after his death. His brick mansion still stands at 171 Grant Street, while Bowser Road, Saddle Club Road, Todd Road and Oak Park Circle were laid on part of his former land.

== Awards and accomplishments ==
- Professional Wrestling Hall of Fame and Museum
  - Class of 2021
- Wrestling Observer Newsletter Hall of Fame
  - Class of 2006
- New England Harness Writers Hall of Fame
  - Elected 1963
- Dominion Grattan, a Bowser-owned horse, was inducted into the Canadian Horse Racing Hall of Fame in 1976.

== See also ==
- List of professional wrestling promoters
