= Ruffy Silverstein (American wrestler) =

American wrestler (1914–1980)

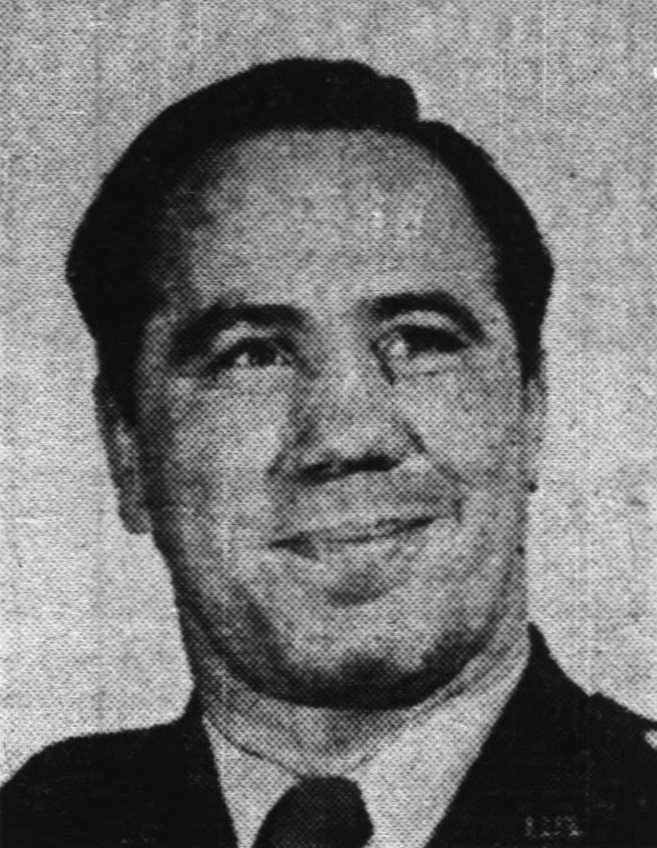
- Silverstein, circa 1950

Personal information
- Born: Ralph Silverstein; March 20, 1914 Chicago, Illinois, United States
- Died: April 5, 1980 (aged 66)
- Education: University of Illinois

Professional wrestling career
- Ring name: Ruffy Silverstein
- Military service
- Allegiance: United States
- Branch: United States Army
- Rank: Captain
- Conflicts: World War II

Ralph "Ruffy" Silverstein (March 20, 1914 – April 5, 1980) was an American amateur and professional wrestler. He won the NCAA light heavyweight championship and the Big 10 championship as an amateur wrestler. As a professional, he was a two-time AWA World Heavyweight Champion.

== Early life ==
A Chicago native, he received the nickname "Ruffy" as a child from his Russian-born mother. He grew up in Chicago's Lawndale neighborhood. He started wrestling at Lawson playground. He polished his skills at the Boys' Brotherhood Republic (BBR), the Jewish People's Institute (JPI) and Crane Technical High School.

He married Evelyn Epstein and had two children, a son (Roger) and a daughter. He served in the army during World War II, rising to the rank of Captain. Silverstein was enrolled at Camp Ritchie as an officer at the end of 1944 which places him among the ranks of the Ritchie Boys; military intelligence trainees and officers who were responsible for obtaining much of the actionable intelligence in the European Theatre during the war. He served under General Douglas MacArthur, and advised MacArthur about the Japanese study of martial arts during the U.S. occupation of Japan.

== Amateur wrestling career ==
In college Silverstein wrestled for the University of Illinois and, in 3 years of varsity competition, did not lose a match, He became the 1935 (175 pounds) and 1936 (heavyweight) Big Ten champion, the 1936 NCAA champion (175 pounds) and an All-American in 1935 (175 pounds). He was a member of the 1936 U.S. Olympic team but, because the Olympics were held in Nazi Germany, Silverstein was one of several Jewish athletes who boycotted that year's Olympics.

== Professional wrestling career ==
An expert in wrestling fundamentals, Silverstein was one of the first to blaze the transitional trail from collegiate to professional wrestling. Strait-laced Silverstein won the Illinois State Championships in his first event as a pro, a victory which laid the groundwork for his celebrated professional career. Undefeated for many years, he ultimately won two AWA World Titles and was twice the WLW Television Champion (1951 and 1952). To many people, Silverstein represented an honest and clean style of pro wrestling, traits that were fast disappearing as the sport grew in popularity. Silverstein's favorite and signature wrestling move was the "Falling Arm Drag". He had a notable match against NWA World Heavyweight Champion Lou Thesz in a losing effort in 1950. Retired from wrestling in 1960.

== Coaching and teaching career ==
After his professional wrestling career, Silverstein served as a coach in the Maccabiah Games in Israel. He also taught wrestling at Chicago's Duncan Y.M.C.A. Interested in education, Silverstein later became a high school gym teacher and founded and coached the Nicholas Senn Chicago Public High School wrestling team (with co-coach Harold Brownstein, a mathematics teacher). He also was Head Coach of the school's swim team. Besides sporting techniques, Silverstein offered his philosophy of life to his students. In November 1977, Silverstein was diagnosed Lou Gehrig's disease. He died as he neared retirement from teaching.

== Championships and accomplishments ==
- Professional Wrestling Hall of Fame
  - Class of 2018
- American Wrestling Association
  - AWA World Heavyweight Championship (Chicago version) (2 times)
- Other titles
  - Illinois State Championship
  - WLW Television Champion (2 times)
