= Jack Claybourne =

American professional wrestler

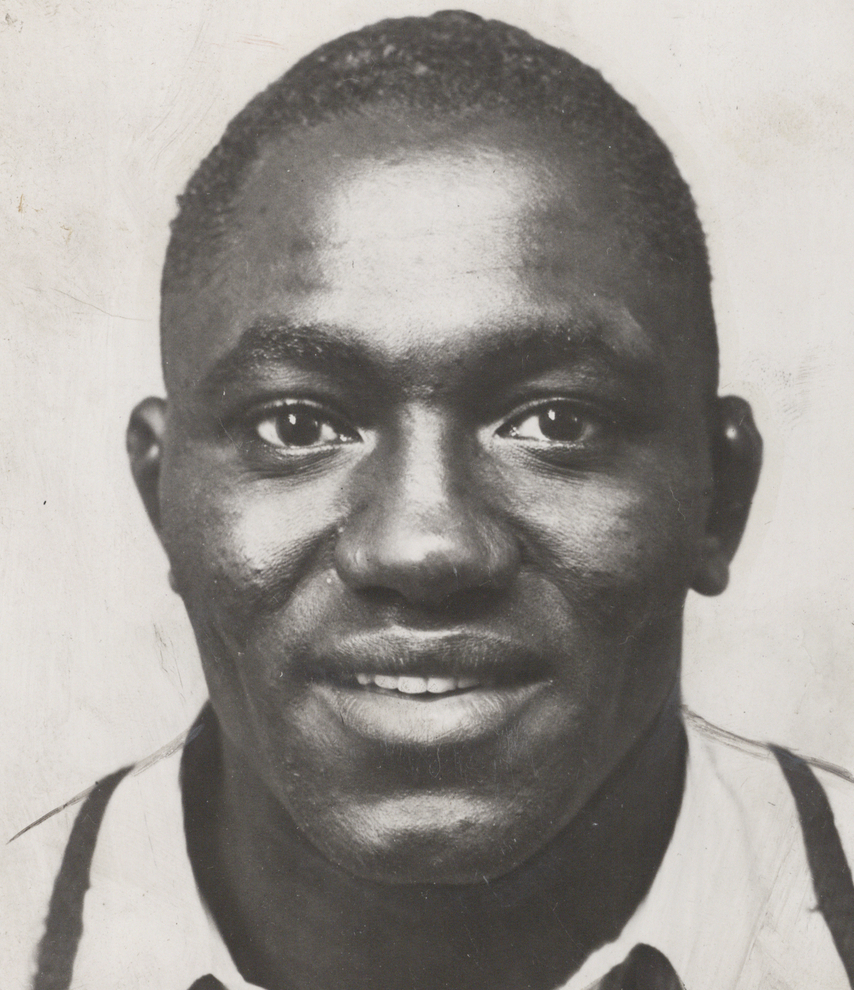

Personal information
- Born: Elmer Claybourn; March 8, 1910 Mexico, Missouri, U.S.
- Died: January 7, 1960 (aged 49) Los Angeles, California, U.S.

Professional wrestling career
- Ring name(s): Black Dragon; Black Panther; Elmer Claybourne; Jack Claybourne; Pablo Hernández
- Billed height: 6 ft 0 in (183 cm)
- Billed weight: 230 lb (104 kg)
- Debut: 1931
- Retired: 1958

Elmer Claybourne (March 8, 1910 – January 7, 1960) was an American professional wrestler, better known by the ring name Jack Claybourne.

== Professional wrestling career ==
Claybourne began his wrestling career in 1931.

On September 2, 1941, Claybourne won the Kentucky Negro Wrestling Championship from Hallie Samara in Louisville, KY. The following year he lost the title to King Kong Clayton. He won the Negro World Heavyweight and the Light Heavyweight Wrestling Titles in the United States. He was a recognized champion in Mexico, Australia, New Zealand, and Canada. Also he wrestled mainly in the National Wrestling Alliance's Toronto and Hawaii territories where he became a major star during the 1940s and 1950s.

== Death ==
On January 7, 1960, Claybourne died of suicide in Los Angeles, California.

== Biography ==
On February 24, 2025, Gentleman Jack and Rough Rufus: The Rise of Black American Wrestling a biography about the lives of Jack Claybourne and the original Rufus Jones, was released. The book was written by Ian Douglass and contains a foreword from Dave Meltzer.

== Championships and accomplishments ==
- 50th State Big Time Wrestling
  - Hawaii Heavyweight Championship (1 time)
- Kentucky
  - Kentucky Negro Championship
  - Kentucky Negro Wrestling Championship
  - World Negro Heavyweight Title
  - Negro Light Heavyweight Wrestling Titles
- Maple Leaf Wrestling
  - NWA Canadian Open Tag Team Championship(1 time) - with Luther Lindsay
  - NWA British Empire Heavyweight Championship (Toronto version)(1 time)

== See also ==
- List of premature professional wrestling deaths
