= Frank Sexton (wrestler) =

American professional wrestler (1910–1991)

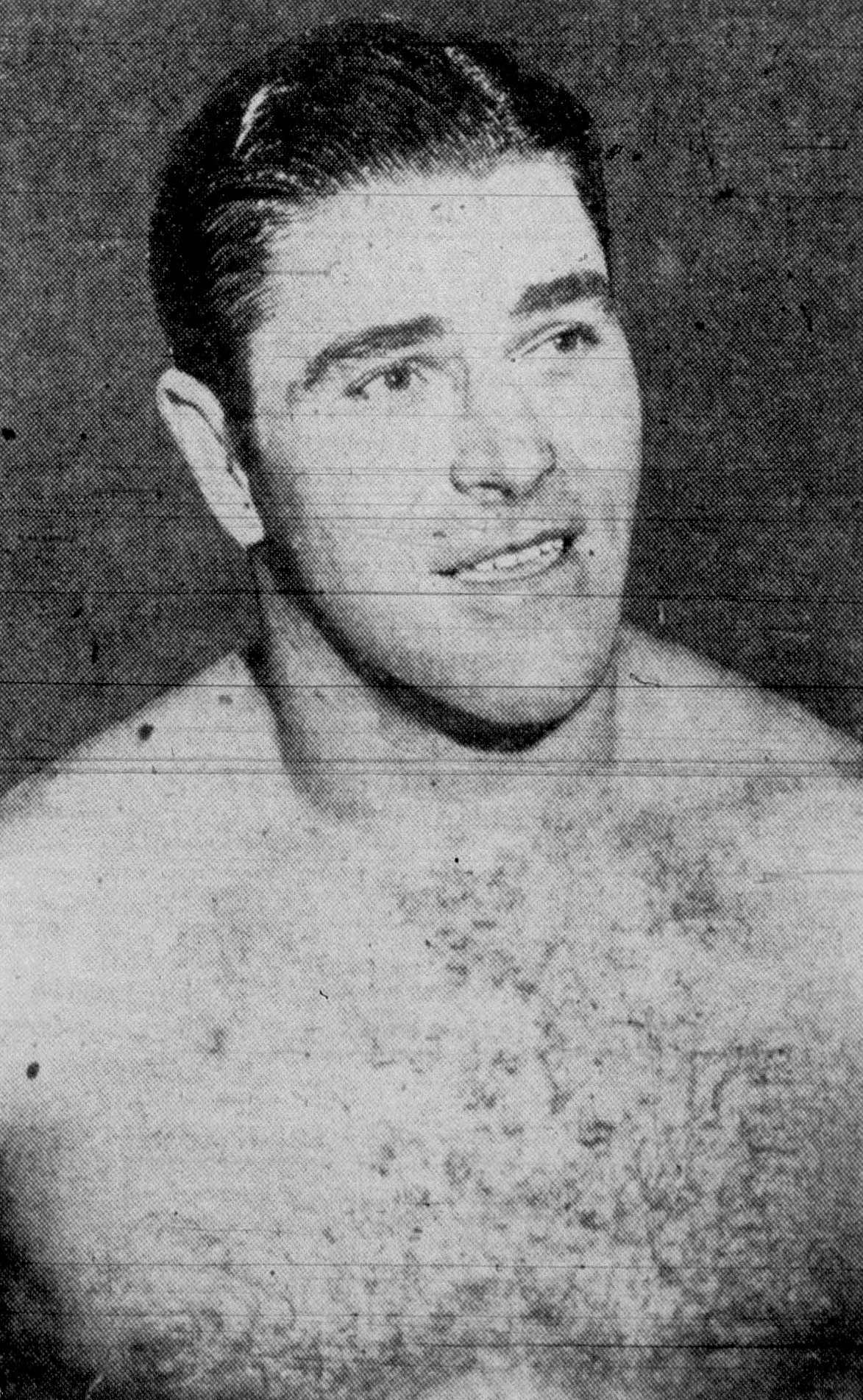
- Sexton, circa 1942

Personal information
- Born: November 1, 1910 Sedalia, Ohio, U.S.
- Died: November 20, 1991 (age 81)

Professional wrestling career
- Ring name(s): Frank Sexton; Masked Marvel #2; The Sexyton Black Panther
- Billed height: 6 ft 2 in (1.88 m)
- Billed weight: 235 lb (107 kg)
- Billed from: Sedalia, Ohio
- Debut: February 15, 1933
- Retired: March 15, 1956

Frank Sexton (November 1, 1910 – November 20, 1991) was an American professional wrestler in the early to mid-twentieth century. Along with Orville Brown, Bill Longson, and Lou Thesz, he was one of the biggest stars of the 1940s. A multiple-time world champion, his most significant run was as the Boston American Wrestling Association (AWA) World Heavyweight Champion from June 27, 1945 until May 23, 1950, when he lost the championship to Don Eagle in Cleveland, Ohio. Sexton died in 1991.

== Championships and accomplishments ==
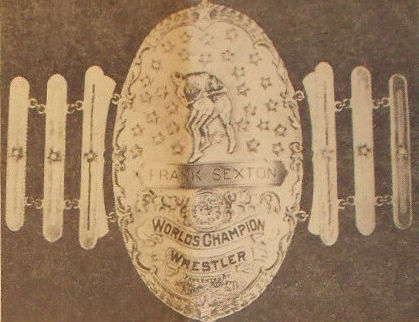
One of Sexton's championship belts

- American Wrestling Association (Boston)
  - AWA World Heavyweight Championship (2 times)
- Fédération Française de Catch Professionnel
  - World Heavyweight Championship (French version) (2 times)
- National Wrestling Alliance
  - NWA British Empire Heavyweight Championship (Toronto version) (1 time)
  - NWA Pacific Coast Heavyweight Championship (San Francisco version) (4 times)
- Maryland State Athletic Commission
  - World Heavyweight Championship (Maryland version) (1 time) - unifies with Boston AWA World Heavyweight Championship
- Montreal Athletic Commission
  - World Heavyweight Championship (Montreal version) (1 time)
- Midwest Wrestling Association
  - MWA Ohio Heavyweight Championship (1 time)
- Other titles
  - World Heavyweight Championship (Europe version) (1 time)
- Wrestling Observer Newsletter awards
  - Wrestling Observer Newsletter Hall of Fame (Class of 2000)
