= Ed Don George =

American wrestler (1905–1985)

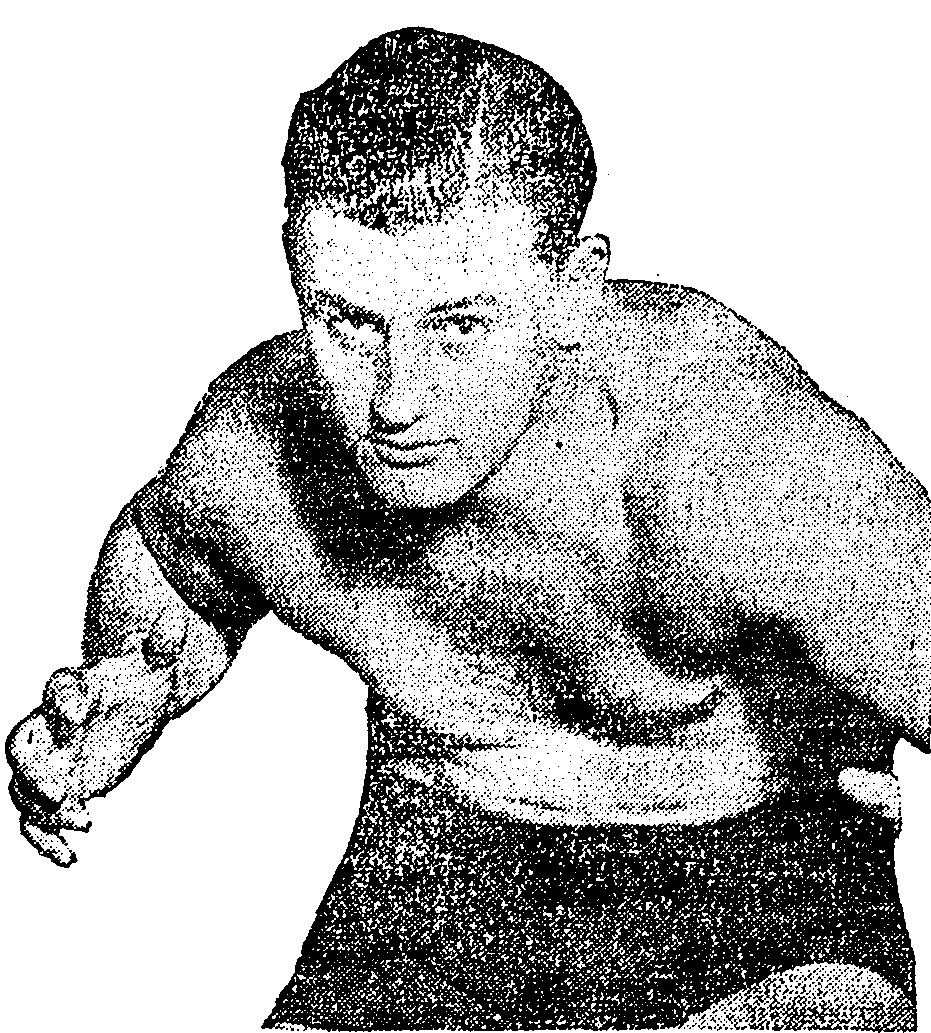
- George in 1938

Personal information
- Born: Edward Nye George Jr. June 3, 1905 Java, New York, U.S.
- Died: September 18, 1985 (aged 80) Fort Lauderdale, Florida, U.S.

Professional wrestling career
- Ring name: Ed Don George
- Billed height: 6"1
- Billed weight: 216 lb (98 kg)
- Debut: 1929
- Retired: 1942

Edward Nye "Ed Don" George Jr. (June 3, 1905 – September 18, 1985) was an American amateur and professional wrestler, and wrestling promoter. A former Olympic freestyle wrestler, George competed in the 1928 Amsterdam Olympics and turned pro shortly after. He was two-time AWA World Heavyweight Champion.

== Career ==
George was born in North Java, New York. He wrestled for both St. Bonaventure University and for the University of Michigan. He also represented the United States in freestyle wrestling at the 1928 Amsterdam Olympics, placing fourth in the heavyweight class (87 kg). During the years 1926–29, Ed Don George attended the University of Michigan, with his concentration of study in engineering. Later on, in 1929, at St. Bonaventure University, he graduated with a college degree.

Quick and powerful, he took on the name "Ed Don George" and began his professional career shortly after returning from the Olympics. He captured the AWA World Heavyweight Championship on December 10, 1930, from Gus Sonnenberg. Double-crossed by Ed "Strangler" Lewis in Los Angeles on April 13, 1931, George dropped the title to the Strangler. George refused to wrestle Lewis in a shoot contest, admitting he would lose to Lewis in a real match. However, promoter Paul Bowser maneuvered it back to George, who held it for nearly four years, finally losing it to Danno O'Mahony on June 30, 1935. George remained one of the top box office draws of the 1930s, and on April 5, 1937, defeated Al Perreira in Paris to capture the European version of the world title.

In March 1942 he joined the US Navy. There he taught hand-to-hand combat to naval air cadets. In December 1945 he left the navy with the rank of Commander.

During the late 1940s through the 1950s he promoted numerous wrestling matches in the United States. In the mid 1950s he found himself promoting wrestling at the casinos in Havana, Cuba until Fidel Castro came to power.

In 1949, George bought a 375-acre (1.52 km^{2}) parcel just east of North Java, New York where Camp O'Ryan was situated. He then very soon afterwards leased this land for 25 years to the federal government, which built, in conjunction with New York State, a New York National Guard training site.

George died in Ft. Lauderdale, Florida, on September 18, 1985, and his body was buried in the village of North Java, New York. He was inducted into the Wrestling Observer Newsletter Hall of Fame in 1996. In 2006 he was inducted posthumously into the Professional Wrestling Hall of Fame.

== Championships and accomplishments ==
- American Wrestling Association (Boston)
  - AWA World Heavyweight Championship (2 times)
  - World Heavyweight Wrestling Championship (original version)
- California State Athletic Commission
  - California State Athletic Commission World Heavyweight Championship (1 time)
- George Tragos/Lou Thesz Professional Wrestling Hall of Fame
  - Class of 2002
- Wrestling Observer Newsletter awards
  - Wrestling Observer Newsletter Hall of Fame (Class of 1996)
- Professional Wrestling Hall of Fame and Museum
  - (Class of 2006)

== See also ==
- University of Michigan Athletic Hall of Honor
