= Gus Sonnenberg =

American football player and professional wrestler (1898–1944)

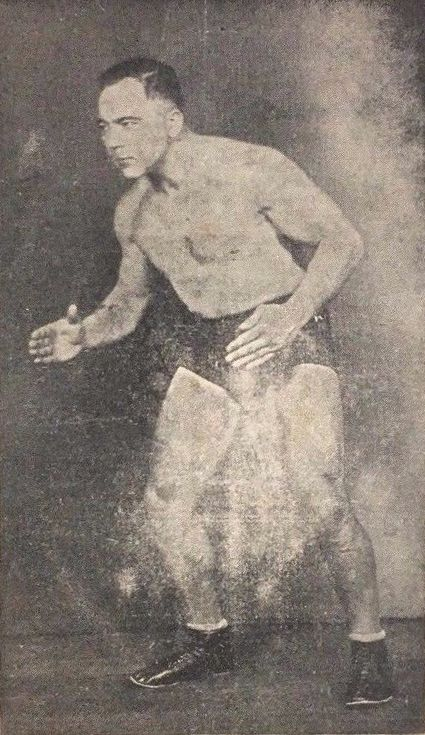
- Sonnenberg as a wrestler, 1930

Profile
- Position: Halfback

Personal information
- Born: March 6, 1898; Ewen, Michigan, U.S.
- Died: September 9, 1944 (aged 46); Bethesda, Maryland, U.S.
- Listed height: 5 ft 6 in (1.68 m)
- Listed weight: 196 lb (89 kg)

Career information
- High school: Marquette (MI) Senior
- College: Detroit

Career history
- Buffalo All-Americans (1923); Columbus Tigers (1923); Pottsville Maroons (1924); Detroit Panthers (1925–1926); Providence Steam Rollers (1927–1930)

Awards and highlights
- NFL champion (1928); Anthracite League Championship (1924); Canton Daily News: 1st team all-NFL (1923); 3× GB Press-Gazette: 1st team all-NFL (1925, 1926, 1927); Chicago Tribune: 1st team all-NFL; Collyers Eye Mag.: 2nd team all-NFL (1926); GB Press-Gazette: 2nd team all-NFL (1928)
- Military career
- Allegiance: United States
- Branch: Navy
- Service years: 1942–1944
- Rank: Specialist
- Conflicts: World War II
- Other work: Professional wrestler
- Stats at Pro Football Reference

Gustave Adolph Sonnenberg (March 6, 1898 – September 9, 1944) was an American football player and professional wrestler of German descent and World Heavyweight Champion. As a wrestler, he was National Wrestling Association (NWA) world heavyweight champion. He played in the National Football League (NFL) from 1923 until 1930, for the Buffalo All-Americans, Columbus Tigers, Detroit Panthers, and Providence Steam Rollers, where he was a member of the 1928 NFL championship team.

== Football ==
Born in Ewen, Michigan, Sonnenberg grew up on a farm in Green Garden, Michigan. He played football at Marquette High School from 1912 to 1915, playing on Marquette's Upper Peninsula championship team in 1915 when the team went 6–0, outscoring opponents 211 to 7. He went on to Dartmouth College in 1916, dropping out after his first year, but returning for a second year in 1919 before transferring to the University of Detroit Mercy, where he graduated.

In 1923, at age 25, Sonnenberg turned professional, playing in the NFL for the Buffalo All Americans (one game) and the Columbus Tigers. In 1924, he helped the Pottsville Maroons win the Anthracite League Championship in 1924. He played two seasons for the Detroit Panthers (1925, 1926) and then joined the Providence Steam Roller in 1927, winning the NFL championship team there in 1928.

== Professional wrestling ==
While playing in Providence, Sonnenberg was trained in professional wrestling and made his mat debut on January 24, 1928, at the Arcadia Ballroom in Providence, defeating Ivan Ludlow. Despite being just 5'7" and 200 pounds and having no background in wrestling, Sonnenberg quickly became a sensation in professional wrestling, changing the style of the sport with his signature move, the "flying tackle." He became a main event wrestler for Boston-based promoter Paul Bowser and unsuccessfully challenged world heavyweight champion Ed "Strangler" Lewis on June 30, 1928, at Boston Arena.

After returning to the Steam Roller for their championship season, Sonnenberg again wrestled Lewis for the world title on January 4, 1929, and won the championship. Sonnenberg held the title for nearly two years before losing it to Ed Don George on December 10, 1930, in Los Angeles. Sonnenberg and Jim Londos were the two largest draws in pro wrestling in 1929–1930. In October 1929, Sonnenberg was attacked on the streets of Los Angeles by part-time wrestler Pete Ladjimi in an attempt to expose the reigning world champion as weak. Ladjimi was associated with Londos, Sonnenberg's rival.

Sonnenberg was again recognized as world champion in the Boston area in 1939, after defeating and unmasking The Shadow (Marvin Westenberg) to become the American Wrestling Association champion. He only held the title for 13 days before dropping it to Steve "Crusher" Casey in Boston on March 29, 1939. He continued to wrestle until joining the Navy in 1942.

== Personal life ==
In July 1932, Sonnenberg was involved in a fatal car accident in Lawrence, Massachusetts when the car he was driving hit the car of policeman Richard Morrissey, who was killed. Sonnenberg was charged with drunk driving and was acquitted in March 1933.

Days after his acquittal, Sonnenberg married actress Judith Allen. Four months later, in July 1933, Sonnenberg was reported to have suffered a heart attack in Los Angeles. Allen announced her intention to file for divorce while Sonnenberg was recovering in the hospital. She was said to have been seen on a date with Gary Cooper. The divorce was finalized in September. He was later married to Mildred Micelli, who left him.

In 1942, during World War II, Sonnenberg joined the Navy. He was serving there when he died of leukemia at the Naval Hospital in Bethesda, Maryland on September 12, 1944, at age 46.

== Championships and accomplishments ==
- American Wrestling Association (Boston)
  - AWA World Heavyweight Championship (Boston version) (2 times)
- National Wrestling Association
  - World Heavyweight Wrestling Championship (original version) (1 time)
- Professional Wrestling Hall of Fame
  - 2007 Pioneer Era inductee to the Professional Wrestling Hall of Fame
- Wrestling Observer Newsletter
  - Wrestling Observer Newsletter Hall of Fame (Class of 2012)

== See also ==
- List of gridiron football players who became professional wrestlers
