= AWA World Heavyweight Championship (Boston version) =

Professional wrestling championship

Details
- Date established: February 21, 1928
- Date retired: November 1952
Statistics
- First champion: Ed Lewis
- Final champion: Don Eagle
- Most reigns: Steve Casey (6 reigns)
- Longest reign: Frank Sexton (1791 days)
- Shortest reign: Don Eagle (3 days)

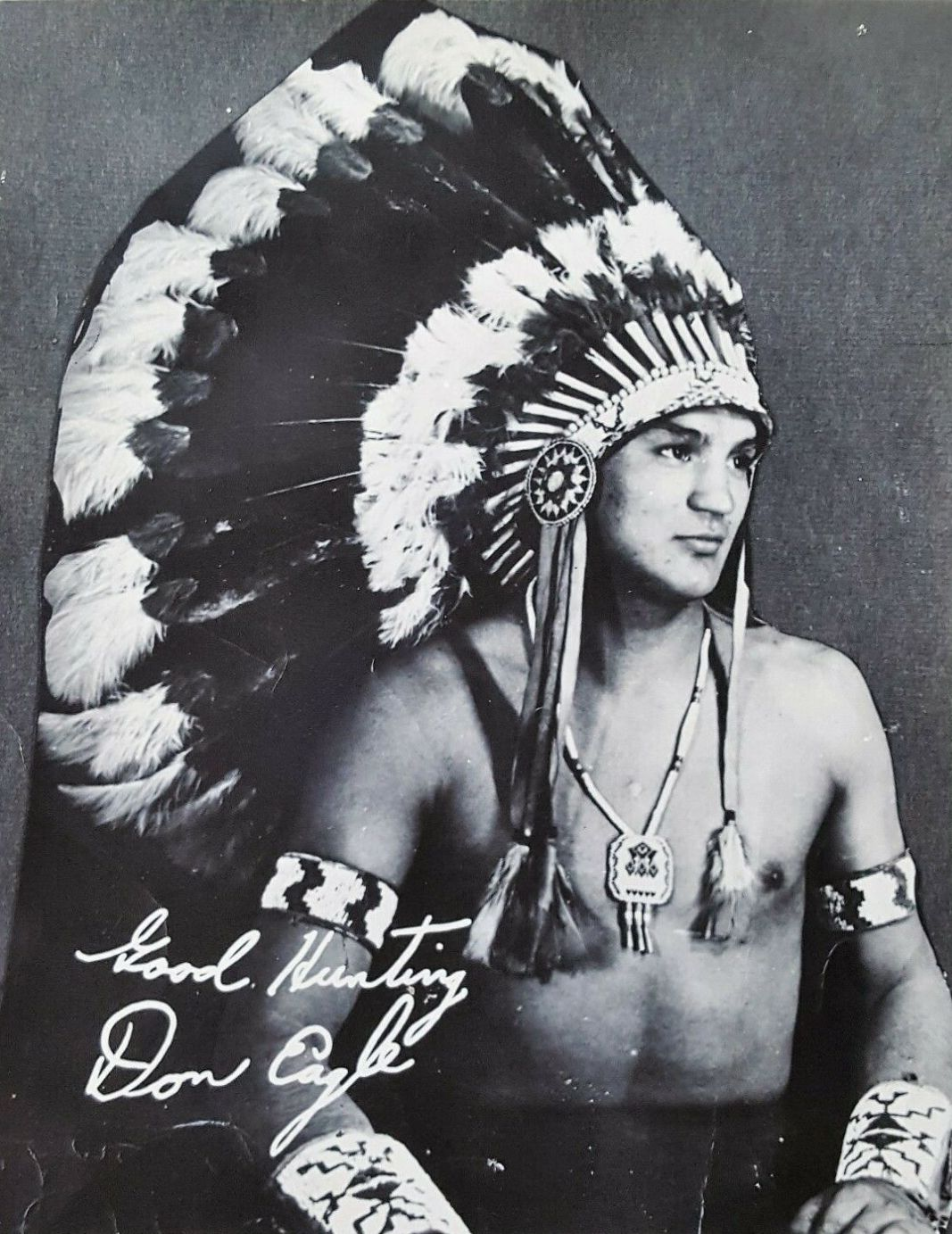
Final champion Chief Don Eagle

The AWA World Heavyweight Championship was a professional wrestling world heavyweight championship promoted by Paul Bowser in Boston.

The title was created by Bowser after Gus Sonnenberg, who had beaten Ed Lewis for the original World Heavyweight Wrestling Championship in 1929, was stripped of recognition as champion by the National Boxing Association. Bowser continued to recognize Sonnenberg as champion and named his championship after the "American Wrestling Association" governing body, which hitherto did not actually exist. Rival promoters, including Jack Curley, countered by forming the National Wrestling Association and its NWA World Heavyweight Championship.

During Don Eagle's second reign, splinter titles were created by regional promoters in Chicago and Ohio. Bowser abandoned the championship later in Eagle's reign, while he was rendered inactive due to injuries in November 1952.

== Title history ==
=== AWA World Heavyweight Championship (Boston version) ===
Key
No.	Overall reign number
Reign	Reign number for the specific champion
Days	Number of days held

No.	Champion	Championship change			Reign statistics		Notes	Ref.
No.	Champion	Date	Event	Location	Reign	Days	Notes	Ref.
1	Ed Lewis	February 20, 1928	Live event	St. Louis, Missouri	1	319	Defeated Joe Stecher to win the original main line title	
2	Gus Sonnenberg	January 4, 1929	Live event	Boston, Massachusetts	1	705		
3	Ed Don George	December 10, 1930	Live event	Los Angeles, California	1	124		
4	Ed Lewis	April 13, 1931	Live event	Los Angeles, California	2	21		
5	Henri Deglane	May 4, 1931	Live event	Montreal, Quebec	1	648	Won by DQ after allegedly being bitten; recognized in Boston and Montreal as AWA champion; Lewis still recognized in California and also wins New York State Athletic Commission World Heavyweight Championship the following year.	
6	Ed Don George	February 10, 1933	Live event	Boston, Massachusetts	2	900		
7	Danno O'Mahoney	July 30, 1935	Live event	Boston, Massachusetts	1	352	The title was unified with the NWA World Heavyweight Championship and New York State Athletic Commission World Heavyweight Championship to be the Unified World Heavyweight Championship; loses to Dick Shikat on March 2, 1936 in New York, but continues to be recognized as champion by AWA.	
8	Yvon Robert	July 16, 1936	Live event	Montreal, Quebec	1	531		
—	Vacated	December 1937	—	—	—	—	Robert was stripped of the championship for not defending it against Lou Thesz.	
9	Lou Thesz	December 29, 1937	Live event	St. Louis, Missouri	1	44	Defeats Everett Marshall for the MWA World Heavyweight Championship and also recognized by AWA. Retroactively recognized by the National Wrestling Alliance as the real World champion.	
10	Steve Casey	February 11, 1938	Live event	Boston, Massachusetts	1	384	Recognized by MWA and AWA, both belts are presented to him. Retroactively recognized by the National Wrestling Alliance as the real World champion until September 13, 1938 due to Casey being out of the country (actually defending the AWA championship during a tour in Casey's native Irish Free State) Retroactive Alliance recognition switched to NWA World Heavyweight Championship.	
11	Marv Westenberg	March 2, 1939	Live event	Boston, Massachusetts	1	14		
12	Gus Sonnenberg	March 16, 1939	Live event	Boston, Massachusetts	2	13		
13	Steve Casey	March 29, 1939	Live event	Boston, Massachusetts	2	20		
14	Ed Don George	April 18, 1939	Live event	Albany, New York	3	199		
15	Steve Casey	November 3, 1939	Live event	Buffalo, New York	3	192		
16	The French Angel	May 13, 1940	Live event	Boston, Massachusetts	1	730		
17	Steve Casey	May 13, 1942	Live event	Boston, Massachusetts	4	811		
18	The French Angel	August 1, 1944	Live event	San Francisco, California	2	14		
19	Steve Casey	August 15, 1944	Live event	San Francisco, California	5	253	Casey joined the US Army; Sándor Szabó emerged from a series of elimination bouts as the duration world champion; Casey defeats Szabo in the consolidation match on April 4, 1945 in Boston, Massachusetts.	
20	Sándor Szabó	April 25, 1945	Live event	Boston, Massachusetts	1	7		
21	Frank Sexton	May 2, 1945	Live event	Boston, Massachusetts	1	35		
22	Steve Casey	June 6, 1945	Live event	Boston, Massachusetts	6	21		
23	Frank Sexton	June 27, 1945	Live event	Boston, Massachusetts	2	1,791		
24	Don Eagle	May 23, 1950	Live event	Cleveland, Ohio	1	3		
25	Gorgeous George	May 26, 1950	Live event	Chicago, Illinois	1	97	This was a screwjob finish orchestrated by promoter Fred Kohler to weaken Eagle's value as an attraction. The title change was initially ignored by Bowser and other promoters.	
26	Don Eagle	August 31, 1950	Live event	Columbus, Ohio	2	(Note: Don Eagle's second reign lasted between 759 and 822 days.)	This change re-established the lineage, which was disputed after George defeated Eagle in a screwjob finish.	
—	Deactivated	November 1952	—	—	—	—	Vacated in November 1952 when Eagle was inactive due to back injuries.	

=== Splinter titles ===
==== AWA World Heavyweight Championship (Chicago version) ====
Key
No.	Overall reign number
Reign	Reign number for the specific champion
Days	Number of days held

No.	Champion	Championship change			Reign statistics		Notes	Ref.
No.	Champion	Date	Event	Location	Reign	Days	Notes	Ref.
1	Don Eagle	August 31, 1950	Live event	Cleveland, Ohio	1	244	Defeats Gorgeous George for the main line title (above).	
2	Ruffy Silverstein	May 2, 1951	N/A	Chicago, Illinois	1	105		
3	Dr. Bill Miller	August 15, 1951	N/A	Chicago, Illinois	1	133		
3	Ruffy Silverstein	December 26, 1951	N/A	Chicago, Illinois	2	296		
4	Buddy Rogers	October 17, 1952	N/A	Chicago, Illinois	1	0		
—	Deactivated	October 17, 1952	—	—	—	—	Rogers was already the Ohio AWA Champion (see below) and his reign continued under that lineage.	

==== AWA World Heavyweight Championship (Ohio version) ====
Ohio-based promoter Al Haft created a splinter version of the title after recognizing Don Eagle's loss to Dr. Bill Miller on May 1, 1952 as a title change. The change was not recognized by Bowser. That title continued until 1954 when incumbent Buddy Rogers was stripped of the title.

Key
No.	Overall reign number
Reign	Reign number for the specific champion
Days	Number of days held

No.	Champion	Championship change			Reign statistics		Notes	Ref.
No.	Champion	Date	Event	Location	Reign	Days	Notes	Ref.
1	Don Eagle	August 31, 1950	Live event	Columbus, Ohio	2	609		
2	Dr. Bill Miller	May 1, 1952	N/A	Pittsburgh, Pennsylvania	1	124		
3	Don Arnold	September 2, 1952	N/A	Dayton, Ohio	1	24		
4	Buddy Rogers	October 14, 1952	N/A	Dayton, Ohio	1	79-107		
5	Don Arnold	January 1953	N/A	N/A	2	0-28		
6	Buddy Rogers	January 29, 1953	N/A	Cleveland, Ohio	2	33		
7	Antonino Rocca	March 3, 1953	N/A	Cleveland Ohio	1	37		
8	Buddy Rogers	April 9, 1953	N/A	Cleveland, Ohio	3	387-417		
—	Deactivated	May 1954	—	—	—	—	Rogers was stripped of the title in 1954 for not defending his championship against Ruffy Silverstein. A tournament was scheduled to crown a new champion in May 1954 but never took place.	
