= NWA British Empire Heavyweight Championship (Toronto version) =

Professional wrestling championship

Details
- Promotion: Maple Leaf Wrestling
- Date established: June 1941
- Date retired: 1967
Statistics
- First champion(s): Earl McCready
- Final champion(s): Whipper Billy Watson
- Most reigns: Whipper Billy Watson (11 reigns)

The Toronto version of the NWA British Empire Heavyweight Championship was a major singles title in that city's NWA affiliate, Maple Leaf Wrestling, from 1941 until 1967, when the title was abandoned.

== Title history ==
Key
No.	Overall reign number
Reign	Reign number for the specific champion
Days	Number of days held

No.	Champion	Championship change			Reign statistics		Notes	Ref.
No.	Champion	Date	Event	Location	Reign	Days	Notes	Ref.
1	Earl McCready	June 1941	Stampede show	N/A	1	N/A	Reigning New Zealand version champion - recognized in Toronto	
2	Nanjo Singh	February 12, 1942	Stampede show	N/A	1	77		
3	Whipper Billy Watson	April 30, 1942	Stampede show	Toronto, ON	1	154		
4	John Katan	October 1, 1942	Stampede show	Toronto, ON	1	41		
5	Earl McCready	November 11, 1942	Stampede show	Toronto, ON	2	22		
6	John Katan	December 3, 1942	Stampede show	Toronto, ON	2	56		
7	Whipper Billy Watson	January 28, 1943	Stampede show	Toronto, ON	2	N/A	Defeated Nanjo Singh when Katan no-showed a scheduled defense; defeated Katan on February 25, 1943	
8	Jack Claybourne	1943	Stampede show	N/A	1	N/A		
9	Whipper Billy Watson	March 18, 1943	Stampede show	Toronto, ON	3	70		
10	Yvon Robert	May 27, 1943	Stampede show	Toronto, ON	1	7		
—	Vacated	June 3, 1943	—	—	—	—	Title held up after Robert Defeated Whipper Billy Watson by DQ in Toronto, ON	
11	Whipper Billy Watson	June 10, 1943	Stampede show	Toronto, ON	4	42	Defeated Robert in rematch	
12	Earl McCready	July 22, 1943	Stampede show	Toronto, ON	3	N/A		
—		N/A	—	—				
13	Whipper Billy Watson	July 1944 (NLT)	Stampede show	N/A	5	N/A	Unknown whom Watson defeated for the title	
14	Frank Sexton	N/A	Stampede show	N/A	1	N/A		
15	Whipper Billy Watson	October 26, 1944	Stampede show	Toronto, ON	6	848		
—	Vacated	February 21, 1947	—	—	—	—	Watson won the National Wrestling Association World Heavyweight title	
16	Nanjo Singh	May 13, 1948	Stampede show	Toronto, ON	2	21		
17	Whipper Billy Watson	June 3, 1948	Stampede show	Toronto, ON	7	273		
18	Fred Atkins	March 3, 1949	Stampede show	Toronto, ON	1	152		
19	Whipper Billy Watson	August 2, 1949	Stampede show	Hamilton, ON	8	65		
20	Yvon Robert	October 6, 1949	Stampede show	Montreal, QC	2	42		
21	Whipper Billy Watson	November 17, 1949	Stampede show	Toronto, ON	9	69		
22	Yvon Robert	January 25, 1950	Stampede show	Montreal, QC	3	260		
23	Whipper Billy Watson	October 12, 1950	Stampede show	Toronto, ON	9	1,981		
—	Vacated	March 15, 1956	—	—	—	—	Watson won the NWA World Heavyweight title	
24	Pat O'Connor	March 29, 1956	Stampede show	Toronto, ON	1	399	Defeated Lord Athol Layton	
26	Gene Kiniski	May 2, 1957	Stampede show	Toronto, ON	5	35		
26	Whipper Billy Watson	June 6, 1957	Stampede show	Toronto, ON	10	680		
27	Gene Kiniski	April 17, 1959	Stampede show	Toronto, ON	2	62		
28	Whipper Billy Watson	June 18, 1959	Stampede show	Toronto, ON	11	N/A		
—	Deactivated	1967	—	—	—	—	Title abandoned	

== See also ==
- List of National Wrestling Alliance championships
