= American Wrestling Association (Boston) =

Professional wrestling promotion

- Acronym: AWA
- Founded: 1931
- Style: Professional wrestling
- Headquarters: Boston, Massachusetts, U.S.
- Founder: Paul Bowser
- Owner: Paul Bowser (1931–1958)

The American Wrestling Association (AWA) was an American professional wrestling promotion founded by Paul Bowser and based in Boston, Massachusetts that ran from 1931 until 1958. From 1949 to 1958 the promotion was the Boston office of the National Wrestling Alliance (NWA), before breaking from the NWA and shortly afterward succeeded by the independent Atlantic Athletic Corporation. The AWA held events at venues throughout New England, its primary buildings being the Boston Garden and the Boston Arena.

== History ==
=== Origins (1922–1931) ===
In 1922 veteran wrestler and promoter Paul Bowser moved his wrestling base of operations from Newark, Ohio to the Grand Opera House in Boston, Massachusetts, running shows in opposition to the area's established promoter George V. Tuohey. After a brief, intense competition between the two promoters, Tuohey declared bankruptcy the following year and was no longer in business. Bowser allied himself with the Gold Dust Trio (world champion Ed "Strangler" Lewis, his manager Billy Sandow and wrestler Toots Mondt), taking on New York based promoter Jack Curley. In 1923 Curley-backed Nat Pendleton was defeated in a legitimate contest by Bowser's John Pesek at the Opera House. Two years later, Curley would get his revenge by paying Stanislaus Zbyszko to double-cross and defeat Sandow/Lewis/Bowser-backed world champion Wayne Munn in Philadelphia.

On March 11, 1926, Bowser planned to regain control of the title by having Joe Malcewicz ambush champion Joe Stecher (also aligned with Curley) who was expecting a different opponent. The plan failed when Stecher walked out of the ring and left before the match started. Bowser issued a press release recognizing Malcewicz as world champion based on Stecher forfeiting the match, marking the first Bowser attempt to have his own world title claimant. Malcewicz and Lewis clashed in Boston at Braves Field on July 1, advertised for the "world's heavyweight championship". Both men had separate world title claims, essentially making the matchup a title vs. title unification match.^{[G]} The match was declared a draw at 2:00 A.M. after taking one fall apiece. Malcewicz was disqualified in their return match in Tulsa, Oklahoma and lost the match (and title claim) to Lewis Strangler Lewis regained the main line world title in 1928 from Stecher.

Bowser client Gus Sonnenberg became the world heavyweight champion by defeating Lewis on a January 4, 1929 card at the Boston Garden. In July 1929 Sonnenberg was stripped of recognition by several state athletic commissions (beginning with Pennsylvania and shortly afterward, New York) after it was deemed that he had not faced worthy challengers. Bowser continued to recognize Sonnenberg and in 1931 branded his organization as the American Wrestling Association, in response to the NYSAC, and the National Boxing Association's offshoot National Wrestling Association.^{[G]}

=== American Wrestling Association (1931–1958) ===
On June 15, 1931 a press release announced the formation of the American Wrestling Association:

"In an effort to straighten out the heavyweight wrestling situation that the State Athletic Commissions and the National Boxing Association have failed to do, many of the foremost promoters of the country, at a recent gathering, decided to organize and put their experience to work out a solution. The first step was the formation of the American Wrestling Association, Inc., a charter for which has been secured from the secretary of state of Massachusetts.
A meeting at which all the outstanding promoters of the United States and Canada will be invited to attend will be held shortly for the purpose of electing officers, choosing headquarters and outlining plans for the future. Tentative plans are to have every wrestling center in each state in the Union and in every province of Canada represented in the membership."

Ed Don George was recruited and trained by Bowser after the former has represented the United States in the 1928 Summer Olympics. After a major push by the promotion, George was victorious over Sonnenberg on December 10, 1930, before 10,000 fans at the Grand Olympic Auditorium in Los Angeles. George met Lewis on April 13, 1931 at Los Angeles' Wrigley Field, and Lewis won two straight falls against the wishes of Bowser, capturing the title. In Lewis' opinion Bowser violated an earlier agreement that Lewis was to regain the championship from Sonnenberg, and therefore took the title back himself in the ring.^{[G]}

On May 4 in Montreal at the Mount Royal Arena, promoters Louis Letourneau and Lucien Riopel booked Lewis in a title defense against former Olympic champion, Henri DeGlane. DeGlane took the first fall and Lewis won the second, both according to plan, but the second fall was reversed when Henri informed the referee that he had been bitten. Claiming that Lewis had caused the injury, the referee disqualified the "Strangler" and awarded the match and the championship to Deglane. Sandow and Lewis disputed the decision and declared that DeGlane had bitten himself or that the latter's second, Dan Koloff, Bowser's renowned policeman was the culprit. Bowser pushed Ed Don George back to the top of his territory, going over DeGlane for the AWA world title on February 10, 1933 in Boston.^{[G]}

Danno O'Mahony became Bowser's latest young sensation in 1935, winning the AWA belt from George before 40,000 paying customers at Braves Field in Boston on July 30, 1935. This show ranks in the list of professional wrestling attendance records in the United States. On June 27, 1935 O'Mahony defeated Jim Londos for the New York State Athletic Commission World Heavyweight Championship and National Wrestling Association world title at Fenway Park in front of an estimated crowd of 30,000. With three world titles to his credit O'Mahony was recognized at the rightful, undisputed world heavyweight champion.

Dick Shikat's March 2, 1936 defeat of O'Mahony in New York created a controversy that ended up in Ohio Federal Court. Bowser's matchmaker Joe Alvarez produced a document supposedly signed by the new champion proving ownership of Shikat's contract. Before any decision could be rendered, the title was passed to Ali Baba. Shortly thereafter, Alvarez and Bowser lost interest and dropped the suit. Throughout the legal wranglings, the AWA continued to recognize O'Mahony as world champion.^{[G]}

Another young prodigy being pushed by the Boston office was Yvon Robert of Verdun, Quebec. Robert was a candidate being considered to replace O'Mahony prior to the loss to Shikat, and was getting victories throughout the northeast. Bowser's ownership of Robert's contract gave him financial interest in Montreal, where Yvon was already drawing significant numbers. On July 16, 1936, he captured the AWA Title from O'Mahony at the Montreal Forum in two-of-three-falls, and at 21 years of age became one of history's youngest heavyweight champions.

Steve "Crusher" Casey from Sneem, Ireland made his professional wrestling debut in 1933, and debuted for the AWA on October 30, 1936 in Boston.

On January 25, 1938, the AWA stripped Yvon Robert of his championship and recognized Lou Thesz, who had dethroned Everett Marshall for the National Wrestling Association world title on December 29, 1937. Thesz's AWA supremacy was short, dropping his claim to Casey on February 11, 1938 before more than 10,000 fans at the Boston Garden. On March 2, 1939, Casey lost the title to a masked individual working under the guise of "The Shadow" (Marvin Westenberg). The Shadow became the first masked man to win a claim to a world heavyweight title. Westenberg was dethroned by Sonnenberg two weeks later, only to drop the championship back to Casey on March 29. Casey passed the title to George on April 18 and regained it on November 3.

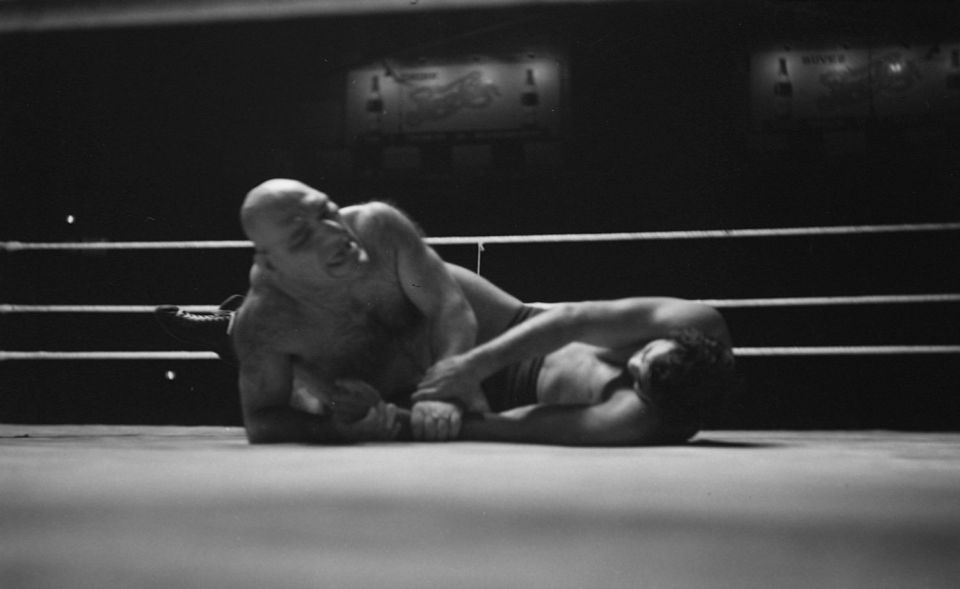
Lou Thesz tied up with Maurice "The French Angel" Tillet in 1940

In 1940, Maurice "The Angel" Tillet joined the AWA. Shortly after his debut, Tillet stripped Casey of the AWA belt in Boston on May 13, 1940, and remained undefeated for next 19 months.

Frank Sexton beat Sándor Szabó for the AWA belt on May 2, 1945 in Boston. In June, he traded the title with Crusher Casey, and on June 27 Sexton began a streak that lasted a total of 1,791 days.^{[G]}

Bowser and his booking office joined the National Wrestling Alliance in 1949. This ensured the territory would have access to top talent in the business for the fans in Boston and New England. However, a principal rule of NWA was the recognition of an undisputed world heavyweight champion that all members would recognize and promote. Although agreeing to the fundamental rules of the Alliance verbally, Bowser refused to sign the official By-Laws because of the AWA's recognition of Sexton. On May 23, 1950, Sexton dropped the title, not to NWA champion Thesz in a unification match, but to "Chief" Don Eagle in Cleveland. Outside of New England, Eagle defended the AWA title in Pennsylvania, Ohio, Illinois and New York. Eagle appeared before large audiences in New York City as part of a talent sharing deal with Toots Mondt. Among his showings were matches at Madison Square Garden and at Yankee Stadium with Antonino Rocca. Late in 1949 the NWA issued a final edict regarding members with other world title claimants. With Eagle out injured since November, Bowser simply dropped the AWA world title and created a new top championship, the AWA "Eastern Heavyweight" title.

After a period of lean years, the AWA had a resurgence in the early 1950s using imported talent from Fred Kohler in Chicago that were appearing nationally on the DuMont Television Network. Buddy Rogers, Killer Kowalski, Don Leo Jonathan Pat O'Connor, Yukon Eric and Verne Gagne all appeared at the Garden and Arena. On April 7, 1953 Gagne and Thesz wrestled to an hour draw before 8,000 fans at the Garden.^{[G]}

Edouard Carpentier beat Thesz in Chicago's International Amphitheatre two months later, capturing the NWA title. The Alliance pulled its recognition of Carpentier after a falling out between Bowser's partner Eddie Quinn and Sam Muchnick at the annual convention in St. Louis. Quinn left the NWA and Bowser followed, dropping his membership in protest. Bowser continued to acknowledge Carpentier as the heavyweight titleholder in his territory, building up for a May 3, 1958 showdown with Killer Kowalski at the Boston Garden. The match, which was won by the challenger, drew 10,267 fans and was refereed by former world boxing champion Jack Sharkey. Kowalski's world heavyweight title was thereafter referred to as being under the auspices of the Atlantic Athletic Corporation, bringing a quiet end to the AWA.

Bowser would suffer a heart attack and die several days later on July 17, 1960 following surgery at Massachusetts General Hospital at age 74. Following his death, Tony Santos' Big Time Wrestling (BTW) assumed promoting in the New England area and continued the lineage of the AAC world title. BTW enjoyed success before losing ground permanently to promoter Abe Ford and the World Wide Wrestling Federation, the current WWE.

== Championships ==
Championship	Last Champion	Image	Active	Defunct	Notes	Ref
AWA World Heavyweight Title	Don Eagle		March 11, 1926 (de facto)	November, 1952	^{[a]}	
AWA World Heavyweight Title	Don Eagle		June 15, 1931 (de jure)	November, 1952	^{[a]}	
AWA Eastern Title	Yvon Robert		December 12, 1952	1954	^{[b]}	
AWA Duration Title	Sándor Szabó		December 8, 1943	April 4, 1945	^{[c]}	

== Affiliated promoters ==
Outside of New England, the following promoters were associated with the AWA and featured contracted talent from Bowser's Boston booking office:

New York:

- Jack Herman (Buffalo)

California:

- Lou Daro (Los Angeles)
- Joe Malcewicz (San Francisco)
- John Poole (Santa Barbara)

Canada:

- Jack Ganson/Lucien Riopel/Eddie Quinn (Montreal)
- Ivan Mickailoff (Toronto)

== Officials ==
- Paul Bowser (owner/booking agent)
- Thomas F. Gleason, president (1931, 1938)
- Thomas Reardon, president (1933)
- John J. Conray, president (1935)
- Lawson W. Oakes, president (1946)
- George Moran, president (1950)
- Tommy Parle, president (1954)
- Homer C. Rainault, vice president (1931–1938)
- Emil Klank, vice president (1931)
- Joseph Asselin, vice president (1931)
- Lucien Riopel, vice president (1931)

== See also ==
- AWA World Heavyweight Championship (Boston version)
- Paul Bowser
- List of National Wrestling Alliance territories

== Notes ==
- ^{a} Eagle injured in match with Killer Kowalski 11/52. Later Bowser was quoted "Since Eagle can't defend it, the title doesn't exist anymore."
- ^{b} Replaced AWA world title.
- ^{c} Wartime interim title while world champion Steve Casey served in the United States Army.
