= Big Time Wrestling (Boston) =

Professional wrestling promotion

- Acronym: BTW
- Founded: 1960
- Defunct: 1975
- Style: Rasslin'
- Headquarters: Boston, Massachusetts
- Founder(s): Tony Santos, Sr.
- Owners: Tony Santos, Sr. (1960–1974); Tony Santos, Jr. (1974–1975); Gene Santos (1974–1975)
- Parent: Santos Wrestling Enterprises, Inc.

Big Time Wrestling was a professional wrestling promotion that held events in the New England area of the United States from 1960 to 1975. For much of the 1960s, BTW was the top professional wrestling promotion in Boston, Massachusetts, and was a significant competitor to the World Wide Wrestling Federation (WWWF).

The company was founded by Tony Santos Sr. in 1960, following the death of Boston's longtime promoter Paul Bowser, and the departure of Bowser's rival Eddie Quinn. Partnering with Jack Pfefer, Santos solidified his control over the city after securing the Boston Garden that same year. Big Time Wrestling was a staple of the regional carnival circuit and regularly visited New England's summer resort towns. Its live events often featured female and midget wrestlers, as well as a variety of wrestling animals.

Under Pfefer's guidance, the "outlaw" promotion became infamous for using "soundalike" wrestlers which parodied a number of stars from both the National Wrestling Alliance and World Wide Wrestling Federation. Big Time Wrestling was one of several promotions to recognize the Atlantic Athletic Commission World Heavyweight Championship, a world title created by Bowser in 1957, although it gradually diminished in importance after the mid-1960s.

In 1963, Abe Ford spearheaded the WWWF's expansion into Boston. Santos was able to keep the New York–based promotion at bay for several years. A rivalry developed between Big Time's top star Frankie Scarpa and the WWWF's Bruno Sammartino which attracted big crowds in New England, particularly among the Italian-American population in Boston, and saw Sammartino eclipse Scarpa as the region's top "babyface" performer by the end of the 1960s. Santos slowly lost his hold on Boston after WWWF television programming began airing in New England and the emergence of Sammartino as a major star in the northeastern United States. Big Time Wrestling went on an unofficial hiatus following the in-ring death of Scarpa in 1969. The promotion enjoyed one last big run in the mid-1970s, this time operated by Gene and Tony Santos Jr., before finally shutting down in 1975. The promotion was revived by former BTW mainstay Richard Byrne in 2006 and began touring nationally in 2013.

== History and overview ==
=== Formation ===
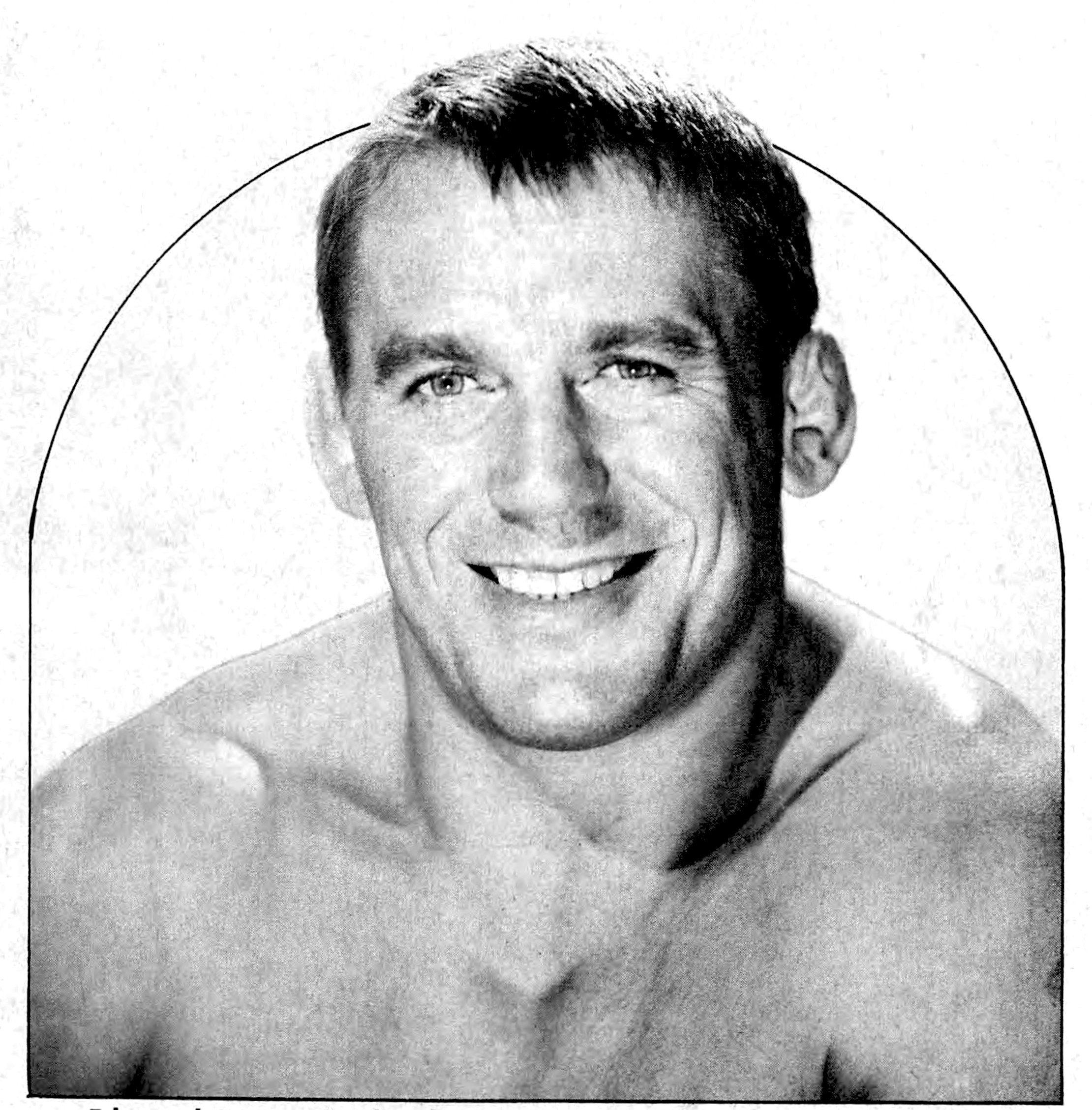
The promotion recognized Edouard Carpentier, who held the Atlantic Athletic Commission World Heavyweight Championship, as its first world champion.

Tony Santos Sr. formed Big Time Wrestling following the death of Paul Bowser and subsequent departure of Eddie Quinn from Boston in 1960. Santos had spent six years working under Bowser, initially promoting shows in Medford and Revere, Massachusetts in 1952, before running Boston Arena and Boston Garden under the "Big Time Wrestling" banner. Santos worked with a number of wrestling promoters during this period including a brief partnership with Quinn and Johnny Doyle. When Doyle left the U.S. with Jim Barnett to start World Championship Wrestling in Australia, Jack Pfefer was brought in as a booker. Frankie Scarpa was the promotion's main attraction, however, Santos built a small group of his own stars by the early-1960s including The Boston Bruiser, Bull Montana, Gypsy Joe Jesse James and Alma Mills. The promotion also started one of the first-ever wrestling camps in the country where many of these BTW mainstays were trained. Using two or three crews of wrestlers, Big Time Wrestling put on shows six nights a week during the summer months. These included midget and women's wrestlers, and even a 300-pound "wrestling bear" called Black Ozzie. For most of its existence, BTW did not have a studio wrestling show. It did, however, manage to get occasional television coverage into Boston via WMUR-TV (Channel 9) from Manchester, New Hampshire and in Providence, Rhode Island on WLNE-TV (Channel 6).

The promotion recognized Edouard Carpentier as its world champion based on his 1957 victory over then NWA World Heavyweight Champion Lou Thesz in Chicago, Illinois. The NWA had acknowledged Carpentier as champion until Eddie Quinn left the organization later that year. Through the belt was returned to Thesz, the decision was challenged by several NWA members who continued billing Carpentier as a world champion for several years. This eventually resulted in the creation of the Minneapolis and Los Angeles versions of the world title.

Santos' decision to continue supporting Carpentier gave Big Time Wrestling the opportunity to "own" their own world champion, however, this would put Santos at odds with other promoters in the Northeast United States. His biggest rivals, Vince McMahon Sr. and Toots Mondt, would eventually break away from the NWA and create their own world championship three years later. In April 1961, Bearcat Wright defeated Killer Kowalski for the BTW Heavyweight Championship in Boston, becoming one of the first African-Americans to win a major singles title during the Territory-era. In addition to the "traveling champion", the promotion also established several regional titles including the BTW United States Heavyweight Championship (1959–1974), BTW Women's World Championship (1959–1970) and BTW World Tag Team Championship (1960–1964)

=== Early Boston promotional wars ===
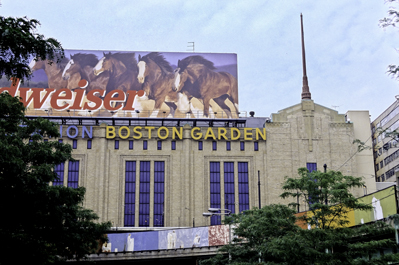
The Boston Garden was one of BTW's main venues during its original 1960s run.

At the start of the 1960s, wrestling promoters battled over Boston and New York much like their "Gold Dust Trio" counterparts did during the 1920s and 1930s. Two figures from this era, Jack Pfefer and Toots Mondt, partnered with younger promoters Tony Santos and Vince McMahon Sr. respectively. Shortly after allying himself with Pfefer, Santos was able to win the city by securing the Boston Garden for Big Time Wrestling.

Santos was not the only one to take advantage of the absence of Bowser and Quinn. In the fall of 1962, he fended off a challenge from ex-wrestler and Boston College football star Dom Papaleo. Papaleo was able to bring in national talent for his shows including Dick the Bruiser, Verne Gagne, and Hans Schmidt. Heavyweight boxer Tom McNeeley was also brought in as a guest referee. Papaleo had plans to train McNeeley for a career in pro wrestling but this never came to fruition. This first promotional war was short-lived due to the failure of Papaleo's two shows held in September and October 1962.

A few months later, Santos faced a second challenge when Abe Ford, representing McMahon's New York–based World Wide Wrestling Federation, arrived in the city. A former theatrical agent, Ford had previously booked talent for Eddie Quinn at the Boston Garden and planned to use the venue to compete head-to-head against Big Time Wrestling's weekly shows at the Boston Arena. Ford's first-ever event on April 20, 1963, however, turned into a complete disaster when half of his wrestlers failed to appear including the recently crowned WWWF World Heavyweight Champion Buddy Rogers. Undeterred by accusations of false advertising, Ford attempted to run a second show the following month. The event was poorly attended despite a heavy publicity campaign and he subsequently returned to New York. Meanwhile, Santos and Pfefer went on the attack by booking journeyman wrestler Isaac Rosario as "Bruno Sanmartino", a playful jab at Capitol's rising young star Bruno Sammartino. Boston wrestling fans who failed to notice the spelling were tricked into thinking they were going to see the Italian-American strongman. On occasion, Santos and Pfefer were even able to get the Boston press to use the "correct" Sammartino spelling which added to the confusion. At one point, Big Time's champion Jackie Fargo challenged both men to a wrestling match. Santos and Pfefer also mimicked other popular wrestlers then working for the WWWF, such as "Hobo Brazil" (Bobo Brazil) and "Pierre Carpentier" (Edouard Carpentier), as well as the National Wrestling Alliance. This practice lasted only a few years, however, the promotion become associated with these "soundalike" wrestlers long after Pfefer had left Boston.

=== Rivalry with the WWWF ===
Santos remained the sole promoter in Boston for another two years until the reappearance of Abe Ford in 1965. This time, Ford had considerably more support from Vince McMahon Sr. which included the debut of the WWWF's Heavyweight Wrestling on WIHS (Channel 38). He also took a more aggressive approach against the Santos-Pfefer group including the placement of special newspaper advertisements attacking their "knockoff" versions of WWWF wrestlers. Boston wrestling historian Tom Burke described the often heated relationship between the two promoters:

[It was] not cozy. Abe Ford had taken out an ad in a newspaper one time which was "the real Bruno Sammartino will be appearing at Boston Gardens, blah blah blah at such a date. He will not be appearing any place else in the Boston area" because [the Santos family] were promoting Poncho Valdez (Isaac Rosario) as "Bruno Sanmartino". So there was not a good relationship there at all. Abe Ford told me it took him years to rebuild the popularity of wrestling from the days that Paul Bowser ran [Boston] because there was such a dry spell. And there was only Tony Santos' wrestling in Boston, and his partner the notorious Jack Pfefer, so there were all these Naldo Von Erichs and Bummy Rogers etc. It was not a cordial relationship.

— Tom Burke, 6:05 Superpodcast (2017)

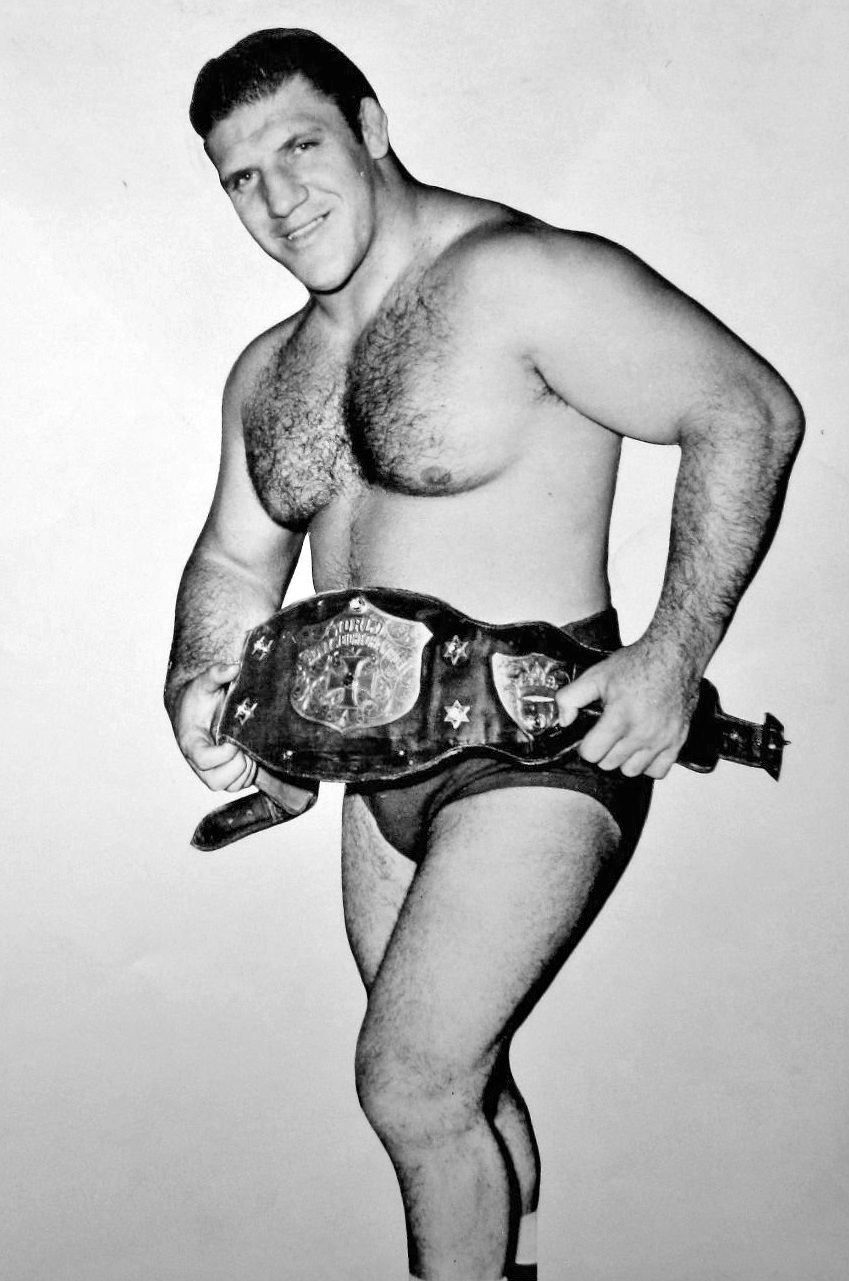
Frankie Scarpa (left) and Bruno Sammartino (right) battled over who was the top fan favorite in the New England region.

Big Time Wrestling maintained its hold on the territory for the first half of 1965. Ford's "World Championship Wrestling" shows lasted from July until October 1965, due to low attendance. For the second time, Ford was run out of Boston and he temporarily left the wrestling business "to refocus on other interests". During the early-to-mid 1960s, Jackie Fargo and Buddy Fuller had been promoted by the company as its world champions. Fargo left the territory in November 1964 and Fuller stopped appearing in Boston after 1966. The following spring Santos decided to hold a tournament to crown a new champion. The winner was to be presented with the prestigious Ed "Strangler" Lewis championship belt, then valued at $10,000. Frankie Scarpa ended up winning the tournament on April 27, 1967, defeating Gorilla Morgan in the finals. From that point forward, Scarpa was billed as Big Time Wrestling's number-one star.

That same month, Ford returned to Boston for his third and ultimately successful attempt to gain a foothold in the city. This time, he had the advantage of McMahon's growing television audience. WWWF programming was carried on four different channels giving Ford extensive television coverage not only in Boston but throughout the New England region. Ford began running regular shows as the Boston Garden with then 29-year-old Bruno Sammartino as the main headliner. Attendance increased dramatically and by the end of the year Ford's events were being attended by an average of 10,000 people per show.

For several months, Scarpa and Sammartino battled to win over the region's wrestling fans, particularly the Italian-American audience in Boston. In April 1967, Sammartino told the Boston Globe that Scarpa was a "phony" world champion. The tide finally began to turn in the fall of 1967 when Sammartino began feuding with Professor Toru Tanaka over the WWWF World Heavyweight Championship. A high point in the Samartino-Tanaka feud occurred at the Boston Garden on September 30, 1967, when Tanaka pinned the champion while using his feet on the ropes for leverage. Although seemingly winning the title, the decision was reversed after the WWWF "board of directors" reviewed footage of the match. These turn of events excited Boston's wrestling fans and rematches held on November 4 and December 9, 1967, were attended by 9,300 and 9,700 fans, respectively. Ford's efforts ensured the WWWF was in Boston to stay, beginning the turning point in the war with Big Time Wrestling, with the city becoming one on the most valuable markets in Vince McMahon's territory.

The rivalry between Scarpa and Sammartino continued for another year or so but Scarpa was never able to regain his former status. The young champion from the WWWF was readily embraced by a new generation of fans and ultimately eclipsed Scarpa, middle-aged and in poor health, as the region's most popular "babyface" wrestler. On January 25, 1969, Frank Scarpa died from a heart attack at the age of 53, one day after wrestling his last match in North Attleboro. The death of its biggest star was a major blow to Big Time Wrestling. The company held only a few more events before it ultimately went on a long hiatus. It has been speculated that the departure of Bruno Sammartino in early-1971 was a factor in the WWWF rejoining the National Wrestling Alliance that same year. As Sammartino had been such a huge draw in Boston, Vince McMahon Sr. may have been concerned that Santos would make a bid to force the WWWF out of Boston. With the additional star power provided by the NWA, however, McMahon was able to maintain control over Boston while preventing Big Time Wrestling, which still enjoyed a significant cult following, from making a comeback in the city.

=== Territorial reach ===
Big Time Wrestling was based in Boston, holding bi-monthly shows at Boston Arena and Boston Garden, but also promoted shows throughout New England with its regular towns including Holyoke, North Attleboro, Revere, Springfield and Worcester, Massachusetts, Manchester, New Hampshire and Portland, Maine. Working with local promoters Santos ran summer tours in Eastern Canada, specifically in The Maritimes and Quebec. In October 1964, Santos and Pfefer co-promoted shows with Walter J. Moore in Akron, Ohio. The longtime promoter of the Akron Armory had been forced to go on an eight-month hiatus due to a local promotional war. A year before its close, Big Time Wrestling even managed to promote a show in Miami, Florida.

Paul Bowser was the first promoter to start a weekly wrestling television show in Boston, "Bedlam from Boston", in the late-1950s. The experiment with television was short-lived, however, as many local fans stayed home to watch the shows on TV hurting attendance for the live events. Santos, a protege of the longtime promoter, also had comparatively little television coverage. He instead relied on word of mouth and other traditional methods of advertising (e.g. distributing posters, taking out newspaper ads, etc.). Santos also published "The Body Press" which was an official program offered to fans at Big Time's live events.

Some promoters made enough money running small towns that it was not worth incurring the added cost of running a studio wrestling program. Paul Bowser's rival, Eddie Quinn, did not have television while running in Boston nor did promoters in other parts of the country. As late 1968, John Cazana was able to draw large crowds in the NWA's Knoxville territory without the aid of television. Not having television also allowed wrestlers to portray themselves as both "babyface" and "heel" performers in different towns without the risk of "breaking kayfabe".

In 1965, Santos signed a deal with Magna Films to produce a number of episodes to broadcast on television. It is believed that Big Time's wrestling show aired in Manchester, New Hampshire on WMUR-TV (Channel 9) and in Providence, Rhode Island on WLNE-TV (Channel 6), however, little information is available and the show is considered lost. Boston wrestling historian Tom Burke has two of these matches from the Boston Arena, Maurice Chevalier vs. Jesse James and Ron Dupree vs. Hobo Brazil. This is the only known footage of Big Time Wrestling in existence.

=== Notable talent ===
I started up there in Boston with Tony Santos and the good thing about that was that there was a good mix in a small territory of some old veterans that had come off the road and settled in that area, and some young guys still trying to find their niche, so I was able to work with some good guys.

I had guys like Luke Graham [who] broke in up there, Pat Patterson, Terry Garvin, Ronny Garvin, [a] guy named Ronny Dupree who was one of the Hell's Angels, [and] Alex Medina, a Puerto Rican kid who was a tremendous high-flyer at the time.

So a good opportunity to work with all these guys, it was a good little territory – so that's where I broke in up there. I had no idea that I would make it, had no idea where I would end up but I knew it was something I wanted to try and that was actually the only opportunity out there because nobody around this area was willing to give me a shot.

— In a 1998 Q&A session, Les Thatcher talks about the Boston wrestling scene in the early-1960s

The promotion used a mix of local Boston wrestlers and "journeymen" from across the country. Killer Kowalski, Bearcat Wright and Jackie Fargo all appeared in Boston as Big Time's "traveling world champions" between 1960 and 1964. Santos also had ties to the Tennessee area and used wrestlers from the Southeastern U.S. including, most notably, Jackie Fargo and Buddy Fuller from NWA Mid-America. Frankie Scarpa was the top local "babyface" and a major star in the New England area throughout the 1960s. Scarpa's bloody feud with Bull Curry caused several riots at the Boston Arena.

Tony Santos also established a wrestling camp to train young athletes for a career in pro wrestling. The Santos wrestling school existed at a time when it was very difficult for an outsider to break into the industry. As one of the few training facilities operating in the country, it was featured in Wrestling Revue and advertised in other popular magazines of the era. The school's instructors included Big Time Wrestling mainstays Bull Montana (Fred Pantano), Gypsy Joe (Tony DeMore) and Gene Dundee (Gene Santos) among others. Longtime BTW Women's Champion Alma Mills, the cousin of Al and Tiny Mills, was the head female instructor.

The Tony Santos Wrestling School, located at 269 Massachusetts Avenue, produced Les Thatcher and Rufus R. Jones among others. Other future National Wrestling Alliance and World Wide Wrestling Federation stars also got their start with Tony Santos such as Pat Patterson, Luke Graham, Duke Savage, Frank Shields and Carlos Colon. Robbie Ellis, then a member of the Amherst College wrestling team, also attended the Santos wrestling school. He drove down to Boston on Sunday mornings and underwent half a dozen training sessions under Bill Graham in exchange for $200.

A number of wrestlers passed through Big Time Wrestling early in their careers, including Chris Colt (then known as The Magnificent Maurice Chevalier), Dominic DeNucci, Don Carson, Ron Dupree, Ron and Terry Garvin, Ronnie Hill, Mighty Ursus, Harley Race (who worked as The Great Gilroy), Cowboy Ron Reed, and Ricky Sexton. In 1967, Dusty Rhodes made his pro debut for Big Time Wrestling. Rhodes drove to Boston after seeing a newspaper advertisement for the Santos promotion, and despite not having any wrestling experience, bluffed his way into working for the company by using his real life friendships with Bobby Duncum and the Funk brothers. Billed as Dusty Runnels, one of his first matches was for the BTW World Heavyweight title against champion Frank Scarpa in the Boston Arena. Having little money, Rhodes slept in his car and spent Thanksgiving with Rufus R. Jones in a Boston soup kitchen.

Big Time Wrestling also had a semi-regular women's division which included at various times Alma Mills, Bambi Ball, Rita Cortez, Lucille Dupree, Margaret Garcia, Mary Jane Mull and Sylvia Torres. Santos also discovered Ann and Ruth Lake, the first sister tag team in pro wrestling. June Byers and the team of Penny Banner and Lorraine Johnson were recognized by the promotion as the NWA World Women's Champion and NWA World Women's Tag Team Champions respectively. The Fabulous Moolah briefly held the promotion's women's championship in the early-1960s. Though it was not until the retirement of BTW's longtime champion Alma Mills that Moolah, then NWA World Women's Champion, was recognized as the undisputed world's women champion in the New England area. The promotion also featured midget wrestlers Fuzzy Cupid, Irish Jack, Sonny Boy Cassidy and Tom Thumb.

=== Style and controversy ===
Big Time Wrestling was in many ways a throwback to the old-time promoters of earlier decades that traveled the "carnival circuit". The promotion often ran in New England's summer resort towns and also featured midget and women's wrestling, and a variety of Tuffy Truesdale's wrestling animals including The Wrestling Alligator, Cindy the Elephant and several bears (Black Ozzie, Smokey, Victor and Yogi). One of its first major attractions was a series of matches between Black Ozzie and BTW Women's Champion Alma Mills. Mills, who was the head instructor for female students at the Santos wrestling school, spent 18 months training Black Ozzie before their debut match at Martha's Vineyard in July 1959. A big hit with summer tourists, the two frequently appeared together during the promotion's early years. Then Senator John F. Kennedy and his wife Jackie reportedly attended several BTW events in West Yarmouth during this period.

At local carnivals and fairs, the promotion often put out an open challenge to the audience offering as much as $50 if they could pin one of their wrestlers – usually the company's "veteran shooters" Killer Curt Douglas and Ronnie Hill. This was also extended to younger fans who would try to take on the midget wrestlers. One of the adult carnival bouts nearly caused a riot when a group of men attempted to storm the ring to save their friend being pummelled by Ronnie Hill. Hill and Les Thatcher, who was refereeing the bout, were saved from the mob thanks to local police officers, nearby "carnies" and drivers from the Joie Chitwood Thrill Show.

Tony Santos was also influenced by Jack Pfefer who sometimes served as a matchmaker for BTW in the 1960s. During Pfefer's tenure as booker, the promotion used a number of "sound-alike" wrestlers including, most notably, "Hobo" Brazil (Austin Johnson and Rufus R. Jones), "Ted" Blassie (Don Carson), The Great Mortimer (Harley Race), Haystacks Muldoon (Bill Toomey), Lou Khesz (Al Tomko), Prince Kukuya (Carlos Colon), Bull Montana (Lenny Montana), Franz (Chris Markoff) and Naldo Von Eric (Chris Jelavrou), "Bummy" Rogers (Ripper Collins), Bruno "Sanmartino" (Isaac Rosario) and The Fabulous Zangaroos (Bull Montana and Gene Dundee).

The wrestlers who came through Big Time Wrestling, and especially the Santos wrestling school, shared a unique type of friendship throughout their careers. At one point, Pat Patterson, Ronnie and Terry Garvin, Ronnie Dupree, Don Kindred and Les Thatcher all shared a rooming house on Westland Avenue for $10 a week. Luke Graham and Frank Hill lived at the YMCA on Huntington Avenue. It was not unusual for even Big Time's top stars to have a second job in order to supplement their income. The Boston Bruiser worked as a taxi driver and Frankie Scarpa was a toll collector for the Port Authority. Shortly after arriving in Boston, Les Thatcher got a job delivering ice, with blocks weighing as much as 25 lbs., to the city's tenement sections which were still using ice boxes. Santos and the other wrestlers were also known for playing "ribs", or practical jokes, on each other. Terry Garvin once called a Boston newspaper claiming that Santos had passed away in retaliation for a prank the promoter had played on him. Even Pfefer himself inadvertently became involved in a humorous altercation with a Santos wrestler. One night, upon discovering Pfefer taking a nap in the locker room, rookie Joe "Red" Sasso mistook him for a homeless man and threw the elderly, shabbily-dressed booker out of the building.

After The Fabulous Moolah lost the women's title to Rita Cortez in October 1963, Moolah ended her relationship with Santos' booker, Jack Pfefer. She allegedly caught her manager and common-law husband, Buddy Lee in bed with Cortez which led to their breakup.

=== Legal disputes ===
In May 1962, Black Ozzie escaped from captivity after falling out of the truck transporting her on U.S. Route 1. Tony Santos, who had recently sold Black Ozzie, agreed to help recapture the ex-wrestling bear. Santos and his son accompanied law enforcement assigned to track down the escaped bear. The group was composed of twenty Massachusetts state troopers and additional police officers from Dedham, Norwood and Westwood. After an all-night hunt, Ozzie was spotted at 6:45 AM by local patrolman Thomas Michenzie walking through a field at the end of Pellana Road in Norwood. The 450-pound Canadian black bear was eventually recaptured near the Research Center in Norwood. Four state troopers stood ready with riot guns while Santos "called the bear by name", walked up to Ozzie and "put a lump of sugar in the bear's mouth". Ken Barbetti, a Big Time Wrestling referee, also assisted in the recapture. The two men spent an hour with Ozzie, allowing the bear to walk the length of her leash until she was no longer agitated, before coaxing the bear into the truck's cage.

The promotion faced at least one lawsuit from a fan who had been injured at one of its events. On September 26, 1962, 40-year-old Manuel Silvia of Fall River suffered a knee injury after a 280-pound wrestler was thrown out of the ring by his opponent and fell into the front row. Silvia sued both Santos and Raymond J. Woodhouse, owner of the Woodhouse Arenatorium in Dartmouth for $75,000. The defense argued that Silvia assumed a risk by sitting in the front row. As the wrestlers were considered independent contractors, and Santos did not "direct" the participants to perform certain moves, the promoter himself should not be held liable. A Fall River jury in Bristol County Superior Court ruled in Silvia's favor and awarded him $7,300.

=== Demise ===
Starting in 1970, Boston had become the final part of the WWWF's "Northeast Triangle", a wrestling territory which included Pittsburgh, Pennsylvania, New York City, New York and Washington, D.C. By this time, however, Abe Ford had fallen out of favor with Vince McMahon Sr. as the WWWF's local promoter in Boston and had since been replaced by Bobby Harmon and his manager Ernie Roth. Abe Ford filed a lawsuit against McMahon claiming that the WWWF was operating as a monopoly. It has been alleged by wrestling historian Tom Burke that McMahon was secretly working with the Santos family to put Ford out of business. In 1974, Tony Santos Sr. decided to retire from pro wrestling to work in the country music industry with wrestler-turned-music producer Buddy Lee at his famed talent agency. The elder Santos turned BTW over to his sons, Gene and Tony Santos Jr., and Dr. Jerry Graham, who had just left the WWWF, was sent to Big Time Wrestling to become their top heel. The newly revived promotion was short-lived and the Santos brothers closed down Big Time Wrestling in 1975. Gene Santos left the business and returned to Florida. Tony Santos Jr. was hired as the WWWF's main road agent for the state of Maine and parts of Massachusetts, and later worked with Killer Kowalski's International Wrestling Federation and Angelo Savoldi's International Championship Wrestling during the 1980s. Sheldon Goldberg, founder of New England Championship Wrestling, has said that the feud between Ford and Santos was among the most important periods of Boston wrestling history. According to Jim Cornette, Big Time Wrestling was one of the first-ever "outlaw" wrestling promotions in the United States. In 2011, wrestling historian Tom Burke inducted the Santos family into the New England Pro Wrestling Hall of Fame. Charlotte and Richard Santos, the children of Tony Santos Sr., accepted the award on the family's behalf.

== Revival ==
In 2006, Richard Byrne started his own version of Big Time Wrestling based in Reading, Massachusetts. He had previously wrestled for Tony Santos during the 1970s. Endorsed by the Santos family, it is promoted as official revival of the original promotion. The promotion set a number of attendance records on the U.S. independent circuit in the mid-2000s. On April 15, 2006, BTW's Killer Kowalski Tribute Show in Lynn, Massachusetts, headlined by Dusty Rhodes vs. Steve Corino in a Texas Bullrope match, was attended by 1,100 fans. On March 27, 2009, a crowd of 1,687 showed up to Danburymania to see John Walters defend the BTW Heavyweight Championship against Jay Lethal with Ric Flair as special referee. Starting in 2013, BTW began touring nationally.

== Championships ==
=== Current ===
Big Time Wrestling
| Championship | Current champion(s) | Reign | Date won | Days held | Location | Ref |
|---|---|---|---|---|---|---|
| BTW Heavyweight Championship | Danny Miles | 1 | 2022 | N/A | N/A | |

=== Defunct ===
Original (1960–1975)
| Championship | Date of entry | First champion(s) (Tag team name) | Date retired | Final champion(s) (Tag team name) | Years active | Notes |
|---|---|---|---|---|---|---|
| BTW New England Women's Championship | May 1953 | Lulu Lamar | December 1967 | Lucille Dupree | 14 | A regional women's title recognized by Big Time Wrestling. |
| BTW East Coast Tag Team Championship | June 1954 | Jesse James and Antonio Leone | June 1958 | Pat Sullivan and Bob Russell | 4 | A regional tag team title recognized by Big Time Wrestling. |
| BTW East Coast Heavyweight Championship | December 1955 | Chief Blue Eagle | August 1970 | Jesse James | 15 | A regional heavyweight title recognized by Big Time Wrestling. |
| BTW World Light Heavyweight Championship | July 1957 | Paul Carpenter | May 29, 1958 | Paul Carpenter | <1 | Carpenter was the only champion and the title was abandoned without a formal announcement. |
| BTW United States Women's Championship | February 1958 | Alma Mills | July 1959 | Alma Mills | >2 | Mills was the only champion and the title was retired after she was awarded the BTW Women's World Championship. |
| BTW Women's World Tag Team Championship | January 1959 | Penny Banner and Lorraine Johnson | July 1968 | Alma Mills and Maggie Santiago | 9 | |
| BTW Women's World Championship | July 1959 | Alma Mills | July 3, 1970 | Alma Mills | 11 | |
| BTW United States Heavyweight Championship | 1959 | Hans Schmidt | 1974 | Gypsy Joe | 15 | |
| BTW World Tag Team Championship | August 10, 1960 | Haystack Calhoun and Sweet Daddy Siki | November 1, 1964 | Jackie Fargo and Don Fargo (The Fabulous Fargos) | 4 | |
| BTW New England Tag Team Championship | 1962 | Mr. Black Magic and Flash Thomas | 1962 | Mr. Black Magic and Flash Thomas | >1 | |
| BTW New England Heavyweight Championship | September 1965 | Jimmy Valentine | August 1970 | Bull Montana | 5 | |

Revived (2006–)
| Championship | Date of entry | First champion(s) (Tag team name) | Date retired | Final champion(s) (Tag team name) | Years active | Notes |
|---|---|---|---|---|---|---|
| BTW Dog Collar Championship | August 31, 2007 | Mr. T.A. | | Mr. T.A. | >1 | |
| BTW United States Heavyweight Championship | December 1, 2006 | Gino Martino | May 2008 | Benny Jaxx | >2 | The title was retired without a formal announcement. |
| BTW Television Championship | 2009 | Eddy "Bam Bam" Delfonzo | June 23, 2012 | A.J. Mitrano | >3 | |
| BTW Tag Team Championship | May 2007 | Slade & Rush | March 15, 2013 | A.J. Mitrano and Mr. T.A. | 7 | |
