= Atlantic Athletic Commission World Heavyweight Championship =

Details
- Promotion: Atlantic Athletic Commission
- Date established: June 14, 1957
- Date retired: 1975
Statistics
- First champion: Edouard Carpentier
- Final champion: Gypsy Joe Gonzales
- Most reigns: Jackie Fargo (2 reigns)
- Longest reign: Jackie Fargo (1,185 days)
- Shortest reign: Ted Blassie (35 days)

The AAC World Heavyweight Championship was a professional wrestling world heavyweight championship owned and promoted by the Atlantic Athletic Commission in Boston, Massachusetts, United States. The title was created in 1957 when Edouard Carpentier defeated the NWA World Heavyweight Champion Lou Thesz when Thesz could not continue due to a back injury. The title was recognized in promoter Paul Bowser's territory, and after his death in 1960 the lineage continued in Tony Santos' Big Time Wrestling. As it was a professional wrestling championship, the AAC World Heavyweight Championship was not won not by actual competition, but by a scripted ending to a match. (Note: Hornbaker (2016) p. 550: "Professional wrestling is a sport in which match finishes are predetermined. Thus, win–loss records are not indicative of a wrestler's genuine success based on their legitimate abilities – but on now much, or how little they were pushed by promoters")

== Title history ==
Key
No.	Overall reign number
Reign	Reign number for the specific champion
Days	Number of days held

No.	Champion	Championship change			Reign statistics		Notes	Ref.
No.	Champion	Date	Event	Location	Reign	Days	Notes	Ref.
1	Edouard Carpentier	June 14, 1957	N/A	Chicago, Illinois	1	323	Defeated the NWA World Heavyweight Champion Lou Thesz when Thesz could not continue due to a back injury.	
2	Killer Kowalski	May 3, 1958	N/A	Boston, Massachusetts		1,067		
3	Bearcat Wright	April 4, 1961	N/A	Boston, Massachusetts	1	56		
4	Jackie Fargo	May 30, 1961	N/A	Boston, Massachusetts	1	1,185		
5	Ted Blassie	August 27, 1964	N/A	N/A	1	35		
6	Jackie Fargo	October 1, 1964	N/A	Boston, Massachusetts	1	N/A	Vacant in 1966 when Fargo left the area.	
7	Buddy Fuller	1966	N/A	N/A	1	N/A		
8	Frank Scarpa	April 27, 1967	N/A	N/A	1	N/A	Title was vacated in January 1969 when Scarpa died in the ring.	
9	Gypsy Joe Gonzales	1969	N/A	N/A	1	N/A	Wins tournament; vacated the title when the promotion closed in 1975.	
