= NWA World's Heavyweight Championship =

Men's professional wrestling world championship

- The NWA World's Heavyweight Championship "Ten Pounds of Gold" belt

Details
- Promotion: National Wrestling Alliance
- Date established: July 14, 1948
- Current champion: Silas Mason
- Date won: August 16, 2025 (aired November 18, 2025)

Other names
- NWA World Heavyweight Championship (1948–2016); NWA World's Heavyweight Championship (2016–present)
Statistics
- First champion: Orville Brown
- Most reigns: Ric Flair (8 reigns)
- Longest reign: Lou Thesz (2,300 days)
- Shortest reign: Shane Douglas (3½ minutes)
- Oldest champion: Tim Storm (51 years, 173 days)
- Youngest champion: Chris Candido (22 years, 243 days)
- Heaviest champion: Tyrus (375 lb (170 kg))
- Lightest champion: Kahagas (205 lb (93 kg))

The NWA World's Heavyweight Championship (stylized on the physical belt and on pay-per-view posters as the NWA Worlds Heavyweight Championship) is a men's professional wrestling world heavyweight championship owned and promoted by the National Wrestling Alliance (NWA), an American professional wrestling promotion.

Although formally established in 1948, its lineage has been traditionally traced back to the first World Heavyweight Wrestling Championship, which traces its lineage to the title first awarded to George Hackenschmidt in 1904.

The title began as a governing body's world championship and has been competed for in multiple major promotions around the world, including the Capitol Wrestling Corporation (which seceded from the NWA and became World Wide Wrestling Federation, now WWE), All Japan Pro Wrestling (AJPW), New Japan Pro-Wrestling (NJPW), Total Nonstop Action Wrestling (TNA), and the now-defuncts American Wrestling Association (AWA), Jim Crockett Promotions (JCP, later called World Championship Wrestling, WCW), Eastern Championship Wrestling (ECW, which seceded from the NWA and later became Extreme Championship Wrestling), World Class Championship Wrestling (WCCW).

In October 2017, the NWA governing body was purchased by Billy Corgan and gradually evolved into a stand alone wrestling promotion with the NWA World's Heavyweight Championship as its premier title.

== History ==
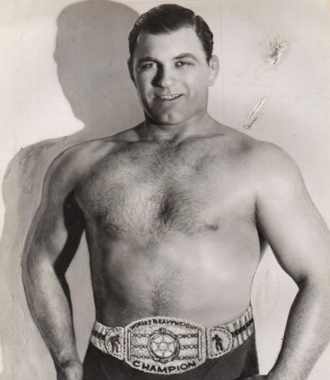
Inaugural champion Orville Brown.

=== Territory era (1948–1985) ===
Diagram detailing the NWA World's Heavyweight Championship's ties to other world championships

With many territorial promotions appearing across the United States, the NWA was formed in 1948 as a professional wrestling governing body. The NWA World Heavyweight Championship was created that same year. Like franchises, these territories had the option of NWA membership. Member promotions had to recognize the NWA World Heavyweight Champion as world champion while retaining the ability to promote their own top championships. Every year, the NWA World Heavyweight Champion would travel to each territory and defend the title against the territories' top contender or champion. The purpose of the NWA world champion was to make the top wrestlers of each territory look good, while still upholding the credibility of the world title. The NWA's board of directors, composed mostly of territory owners, decided when the title changed hands via a vote.

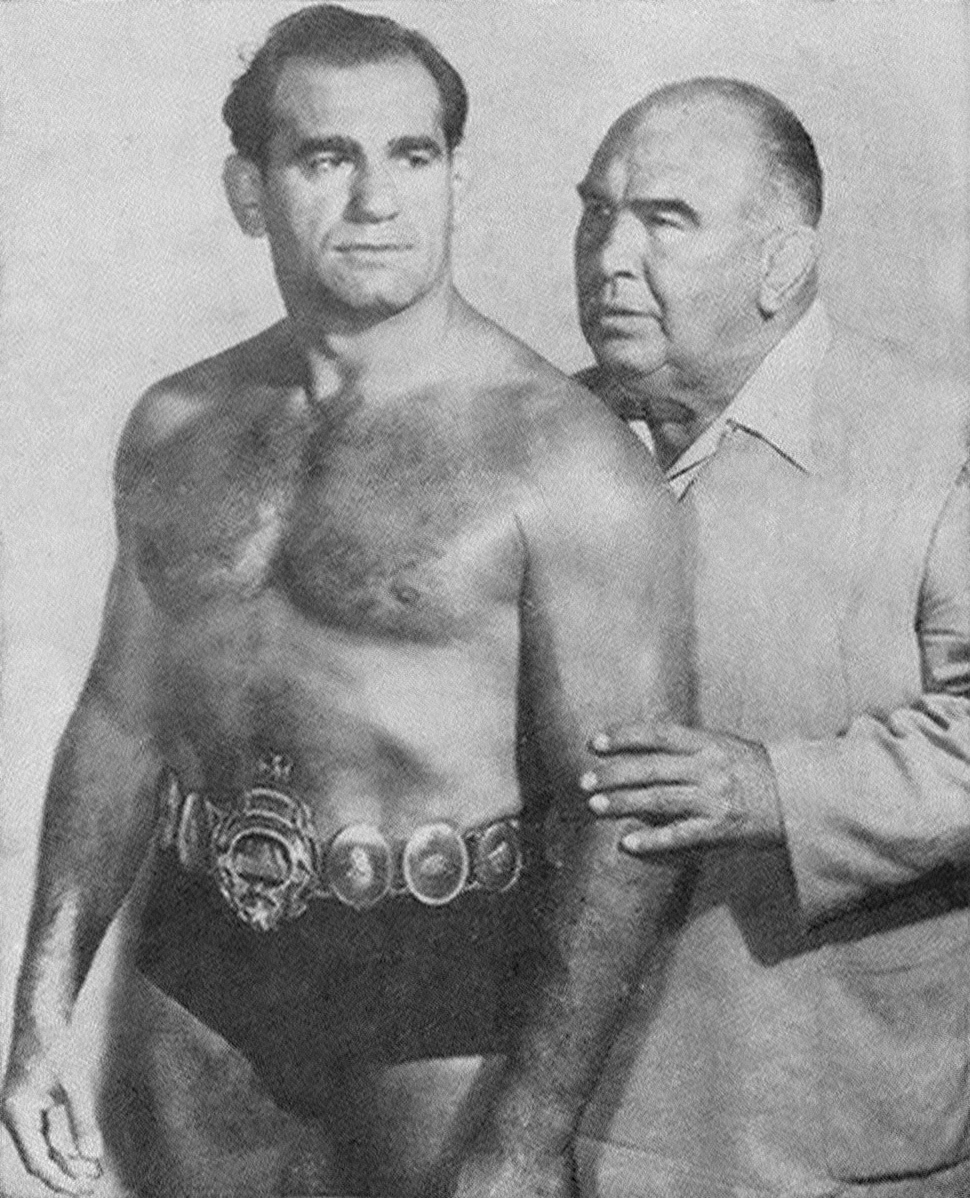
Longest reigning and six-time champion, by retrospective lineage traced back to 1904, Lou Thesz (wearing the second version of the belt) pictured with manager Ed Lewis in the 1950s

By the late 1950s, however, the system began to break down. As Lou Thesz continued to hold the title, other popular wrestlers such as Verne Gagne became frustrated over the lack of change. There were also disputes over the number of appearances the champion would make in different regions.

On June 14, 1957, in Chicago, Thesz defended the world title against Canadian wrestler Édouard Carpentier in a two out of three falls match. Thesz and Carpentier split the first two falls. In the third fall, Thesz was disqualified by referee Ed Whalen who raised Carpentier's hand in victory. The NWA later voided the title change based on the disqualification. Thesz defeated Carpentier by disqualification in a Montreal rematch on July 24. It had been planned that the NWA would present Thesz and Carpentier as rival champions in different cities following a similar pattern to the successful title dispute matches between Thesz and Leo Nomellini in 1955. Carpentier would also be able to make appearances in the U.S. as champion while Thesz was on an overseas tour. However, as a result of various disputes within the NWA, Carpentier's manager, wrestling promoter Eddie Quinn, left the organization in August making Carpentier unavailable to the NWA. The organization dealt with the situation by announcing 71 days after Carpentier's win in Chicago that it did not recognize Carpentier's win and had never recognized it. Quinn started promoting Carpentier as the true NWA world champion based on the match with Thesz. In 1958, Quinn started shopping Carpentier around to promoters interested in leaving the NWA. A victory over Carpentier could give a local champion a credible claim to the world championship of wrestling.

The Boston NWA affiliate known as the Atlantic Athletic Commission (AAC) arranged a match between Killer Kowalski and Carpentier on May 3, 1958. Kowalski's victory created what was after known as the ACC World Heavyweight Championship and later Boston's Big Time Wrestling (BTW) Heavyweight Championship.

Verne Gagne, who had been trying to become NWA World Heavyweight Champion for some time, defeated Carpentier in Omaha, Nebraska, on August 9, 1958. This was recognized as a title change by NWA affiliate promotions in the state – these promotions would later evolve into the American Wrestling Association (AWA) in 1960. This disputed Nebraska version of the NWA World Heavyweight Championship was later known simply as the Omaha version of the World Heavyweight Championship. The title was unified with the AWA World Heavyweight Championship on September 7, 1963.

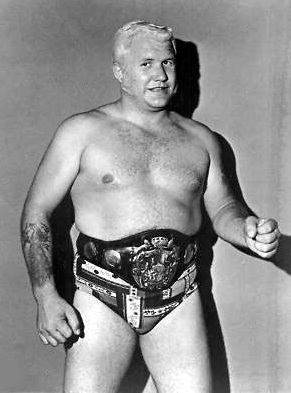
8-time NWA World Heavyweight Champion Harley Race pictured with the "Crown Belt" during his first reign in 1973

The "Crown" version of the championship belt debuted in 1959.

The North American Wrestling Alliance (NAWA, later the Worldwide Wrestling Associates (WWA)) in Los Angeles recognized Carpentier as NWA champion in July 1959 as part of gradually splitting from the NWA. On June 12, 1961, Carpentier lost a match to Freddie Blassie which created the basis for the Los Angeles version of the WWA World Heavyweight Championship. The title ceased to exist when the WWA returned to the NWA on October 1, 1968.

The World Wide Wrestling Federation (WWWF), which later evolved into today's WWE, was the major wrestling promotion in the northeast United States in the early 1960s. Vincent J. McMahon's Capitol Wrestling Corporation (CWC), the precursor to the WWWF, seceded from the NWA for a variety of reasons including the selection of the NWA World Heavyweight Champion and the number of dates wrestled by the champion in the promotion. Ostensibly, the dispute was over Buddy Rogers losing the NWA World Heavyweight Championship to Lou Thesz in one fall instead of a best-of-three; the format in which NWA World Heavyweight Championship matches were traditionally decided at the time. This one fall match was sanctioned by NWA promoters, despite objections from CWC executives, who held majority control over the NWA board of directors at the time. Following Lou Thesz's World Heavyweight Championship win, CWC seceded from the NWA and became the World Wide Wrestling Federation. Rogers was then recognized as the first WWWF World Heavyweight Champion.

The "Ten Pounds of Gold" (also known as the "Domed Globe Belt") version of the championship belt debuted on July 20, 1973, having been first presented to Harley Race by then-NWA President Sam Muchnick.

When Jim Crockett Promotions wrestler Ric Flair won the NWA World title in 1981, he traveled to other NWA territories and defended the belt. He would drop the belt and regain it, as the NWA board of directors decided. On more than one occasion, however, Flair lost and regained the belt without the official sanctioning of the NWA. In most cases (such as the case of Jack Veneno's championship victory), these switches continue to be ignored by the NWA. However, since 2015, the NWA has occasionally recognized the unauthorized Flair-Race switch that had occurred in March 20, 1984 in New Zealand.

=== Jim Crockett Promotions (1985–1988) ===
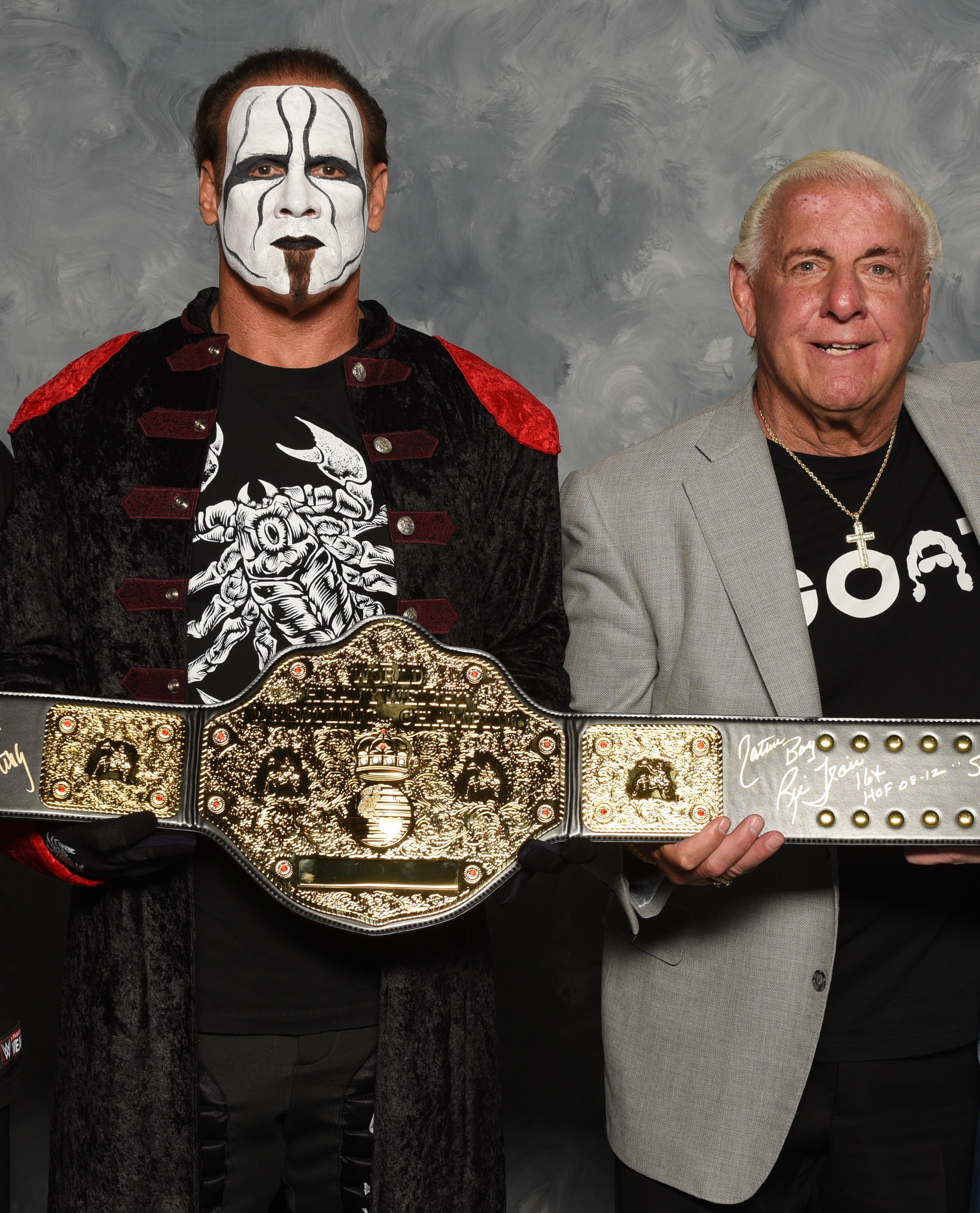
Former NWA World's Heavyweight champions Sting and Ric Flair pose with a replica of the "Big Gold Belt", which represented the championship during their reigns in WCW

By early 1985, Jim Crockett Promotions (JCP) controlled many NWA territories and limited championship matches to performers under contract with JCP thus making the title exclusive to the promotion.

The "Big Gold Belt" version of the NWA World Heavyweight Championship belt debuted on February 14, 1986, at Battle of the Belts II, an event co-promoted by Championship Wrestling from Florida and JCP. At the event, NWA World Heavyweight Champion Ric Flair successfully defended the title against Barry Windham.

It was during this time that JCP made a failed bid to go national and almost filed for bankruptcy in an attempt to compete with the WWF. Turner Broadcasting purchased the company, because it had a high rated program airing on the WTBS cable station. Completing the deal in November 1988, Turner began changing the company to World Championship Wrestling (WCW), which maintained a partnership with the NWA and continued promoting the NWA World Heavyweight Champion Ric Flair.

=== World Championship Wrestling (1988–1993) ===
WCW stayed in the NWA, but Turner slowly phased out the NWA name. The NWA organization existed only on paper at this point; on television, it was portrayed that, by early 1991, the NWA World Heavyweight Championship had become the WCW World Heavyweight Championship.

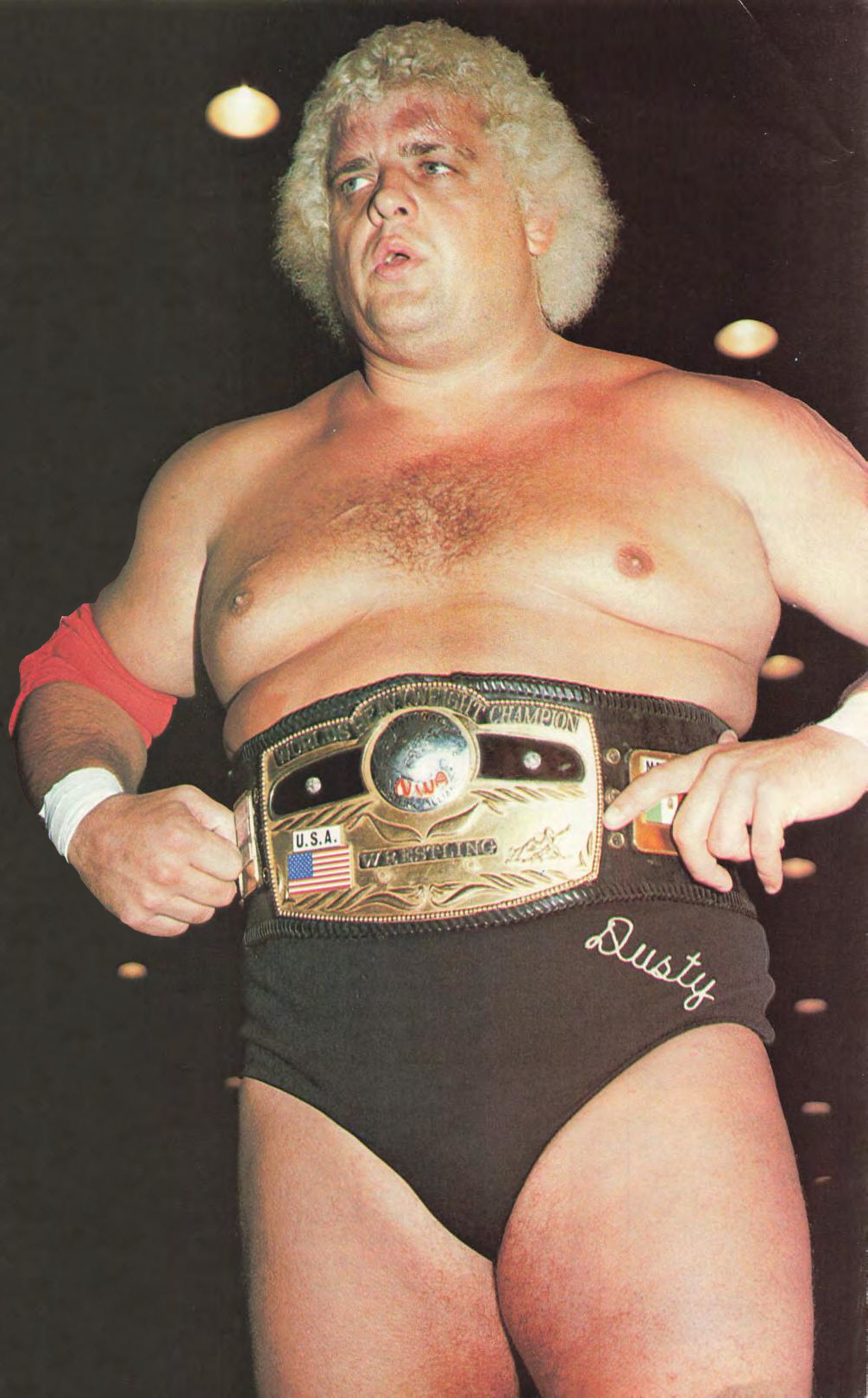
Dusty Rhodes is a 3-time NWA World Heavyweight Champion

Due to a falling out with WCW Executive Vice-President Jim Herd, WCW World Heavyweight Champion Ric Flair was fired from WCW on July 1, 1991, while still being recognized as the NWA World Heavyweight Champion. Flair took the NWA belt with him because WCW and Herd had not returned the $25,000 bond Flair had paid on the belt. After Flair's departure from WCW, the company had made a new, separate WCW World title belt. A match was held for the vacated WCW World Heavyweight Championship within two weeks of the departure, but no mention was made of the NWA title. Flair was stripped of the NWA World Heavyweight Championship by NWA's board of directors shortly after he signed with the WWF in September 1991; an NWA board had to be reconstituted, as most members had gone out of business or been bought out by JCP/WCW. Flair displayed the Big Gold Belt on WWF television, calling himself the "Real World's Heavyweight Champion". After winning the WWF Championship, Flair's "Real World's Heavyweight Champion" belt was dropped. WCW, which had subsequently filed a lawsuit against the WWF to prevent them from using the Big Gold Belt on television, eventually dropped the action because the belt was returned to WCW in July 1992.

In August 1992, the NWA board authorized WCW and New Japan Pro-Wrestling to hold a tournament to decide a new NWA World Heavyweight Champion using the Big Gold Belt, now returned to WCW by the WWF. Turner's company still maintained its WCW World Championship, thus having two World Heavyweight titles present in the same promotion. The tournament was won by Japanese wrestler Masahiro Chono. From 1992 to 1993, the NWA belt was defended in Japan and on WCW television. Flair returned to WCW and regained the NWA belt from Barry Windham in July 1993; that same year, WCW recognized the Ric Flair-Tatsumi Fujinami NWA title change from March 21, 1991. Disputes between WCW management and the NWA board began emerging in the summer of 1993 over a variety of issues, primarily a storyline by WCW that would have had the NWA title switch to Rick Rude.

On September 1, 1993, WCW withdrew their membership from the NWA but kept the NWA title belt which they owned. A court battle decided that WCW could not continue to use the letters "NWA" to describe or promote the belt, but ruled that WCW did possess a right to the physical Big Gold Belt and its historical lineage per a signed agreement between the previous NWA President Seiji Sakaguchi and WCW. Per this court ruling, the title belt dropped the recognition as being the NWA World Heavyweight title but continued to be billed as the World Heavyweight Championship by WCW. Soon after, the Big Gold Belt was defended without any company affiliation, even being referred to simply as the Big Gold Belt for a short time, until it became known as the WCW International World Heavyweight Championship. This title was recognized as the championship of a fictitious entity known as "WCW International", which served as a replacement for the NWA Board, until the title was unified with the main WCW title on June 23, 1994.

=== ECW, WWF, and the independent circuit (1993–2002) ===
Despite losing WCW as its flagship promotion, the NWA picked up new members and remained in existence as a governing body. After nearly a year, the organization planned to scheduled a tournament to crown a new champion and brought back the "Ten Pounds of Gold" to represent this new champion.

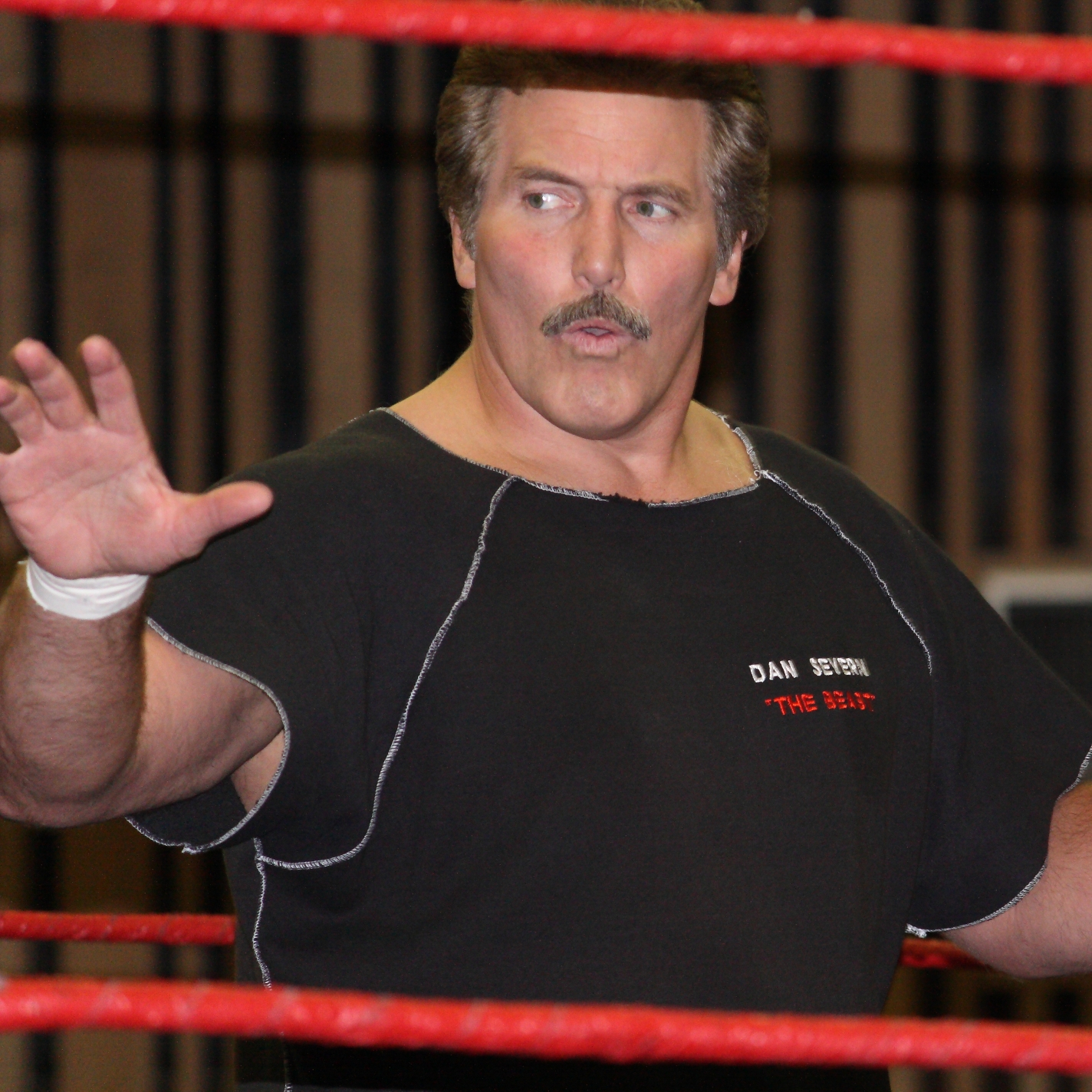
Dan Severn is a 2-time NWA World Heavyweight Champion

By 1994, the Eastern Championship Wrestling (ECW) territory became the NWA's most televised affiliated wrestling promotion. The NWA decided to hold an NWA World Title Tournament through ECW at the ECW Arena in August 1994, which was won by Shane Douglas. Due to a dispute between NWA President Dennis Coralluzzo and ECW owner Tod Gordon, after the match, Douglas threw the NWA World Heavyweight Championship belt down and picked up the ECW Heavyweight Championship belt, proclaiming himself ECW World champion. Almost immediately thereafter ECW withdrew from the NWA and became Extreme Championship Wrestling, with Coralluzzo stripping Douglas of the NWA title.

Despite this blow to the organization, the NWA held another tournament three months later in Cherry Hill, New Jersey, hosted by Coralluzzo and Smoky Mountain Wrestling (SMW) owner Jim Cornette. Chris Candido won this tournament and the title was recognized and defended in promotions such as SMW and the United States Wrestling Association. Candido held the belt for a few months before dropping it to Dan Severn of the Ultimate Fighting Championship (UFC) in February 1995. Severn held the belt continuously for four years, appearing on both wrestling and UFC events with the NWA World championship belt. Although Severn had attempted to go the "traveling champion" route done by former champions Thesz, Dory Funk, Jr., Harley Race, and Terry Funk, the competition level was relatively minor due to the lack of strong NWA territories.

It was during this time, Severn had a customized NWA World Heavyweight Championship belt made exclusively for him.

Trying to get back in the national spotlight, the NWA made a deal in 1997 with Vincent K. McMahon to appear on World Wrestling Federation (WWF) television. In 1998, NWA World champion Dan Severn became part of Jim Cornette's NWA faction. Also part of Cornette's NWA faction was NWA North American Champion Jeff Jarrett, who won the vacant title by defeating Barry Windham on Monday Night Raw. The NWA's deal with the WWF never accomplished its intended purpose of reestablishing the NWA as a major force in wrestling and McMahon ended it in less than a year. The NWA belt went back to being defended on the independent circuit and in the remaining NWA territories.

In 1999, Severn lost the title to former Olympic judoka Naoya Ogawa, and the title picture became slightly more competitive. The champions nonetheless remained wrestlers from independent promotions, regardless of whether they were from North America (Severn, Mike Rapada, Sabu), Asia (Ogawa, Shinya Hashimoto), or Europe (Gary Steele).

=== Total Nonstop Action Wrestling (2002–2007) ===
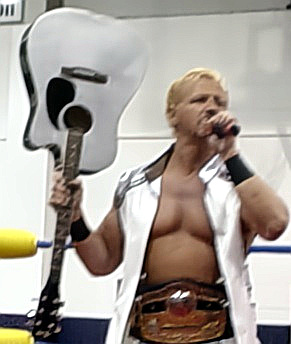
Jeff Jarrett, a six-time champion, founded TNA in 2002. The following 6 years, he would have the control of the title.

In June 2002, Jeff and Jerry Jarrett formed NWA: Total Nonstop Action (NWA-TNA; was known as Impact Wrestling 2017-2024). The Jarretts worked out a licensing deal with the NWA and its affiliated promotions, with NWA-TNA receiving control over the NWA World Heavyweight and NWA World Tag Team titles. While working out a cable deal, the Jarretts put NWA-TNA on weekly pay-per-view during the company's first two years of existence. The NWA World Heavyweight Champion at the time, Dan Severn, was unable to appear on the inaugural NWA-TNA PPV card, and he was stripped of the NWA title. Ken Shamrock was then declared the new NWA World Heavyweight Champion after winning a Gauntlet for the Gold battle royal. In 2004, NWA-TNA withdrew from the NWA, dropping the NWA from their promotion name and becoming known as Total Nonstop Action Wrestling (TNA). However, TNA retained the rights to use the NWA World Heavyweight and Tag Team titles until May 13, 2007, when the agreement ended, with TNA creating its own World and Tag Team championships.

During this agreement, TNA co-founder Jeff Jarrett would hold the title the most often with six reigns, followed by A.J. Styles with three, and lastly Ron Killings and Christian Cage with two reigns each. During the TNA years, a title change unauthorized by the NWA took place on an International Wrestling Association event in Puerto Rico, where Ray González pinned Jarrett to win the championship before being stripped of the title later on the same event. While the González title change was initially ignored by both the NWA and TNA, beginning in 2015, the NWA has occasionally recognized González as a former NWA champion. This makes González the first Caribbean wrestler to be recognized as NWA World champion (the reigns of Caribbean wrestlers Jack Veneno and Carlos Colón remain unrecognized).

=== Return to the independent circuit (2007–2017) ===
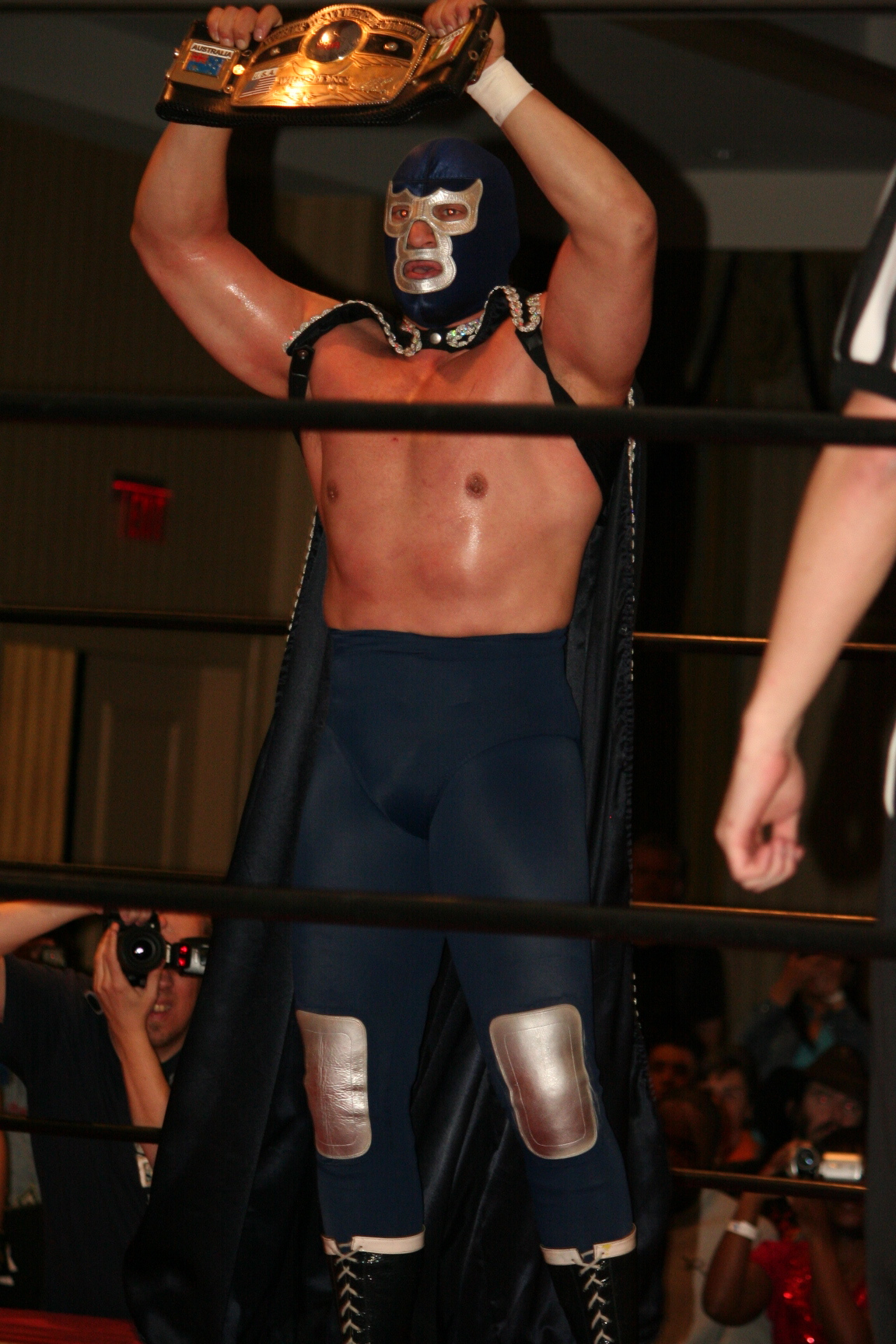
Blue Demon Jr. is the first Mexican wrestler and the first masked luchador to hold the championship

On May 22, 2007, the NWA announced a tournament, titled Reclaiming the Glory, to fill the title vacancy left after the end of the NWA's relationship with TNA. Sixteen men competed for the championship, with Adam Pearce, filling in for an injured Bryan Danielson, winning the belt by defeating Brent Albright on September 1, 2007, in Bayamón, Puerto Rico. Pearce was active in defending the championship but suffered from the same problems that had plagued other champions in the post-1980s NWA: a lack of stable promotions within the NWA made it difficult to have a "traveling champion", so most of Pearce's defenses took place in the NWA Pro promotion owned by David Marquez and John Rivera.

On June 7, 2008, at the Ring of Honor (ROH) event, Respect is Earned II, Pearce revealed the NWA World Heavyweight Championship belt at the conclusion of his match, with the championship receiving official recognition from ROH shortly after.

On October 25, 2008, Blue Demon Jr. became the first Mexican professional wrestler, as well as first masked luchador, to win the NWA World Heavyweight Championship when he defeated champion Adam Pearce in Mexico City.

In early-to-mid-2012, NWA champion Colt Cabana and Adam Pearce began facing each other in a series of matches dubbed the "Seven Levels of Hate" – a best of seven series between the two wrestlers. The fourth match of the series was a two out of three falls contest held on July 21, 2012, in Kansas City, Missouri. The NWA sanctioned the match as a world championship match and Pearce emerged victorious to become a five-time world champion. Both wrestlers were tied at three matches apiece when the NWA underwent another major change.

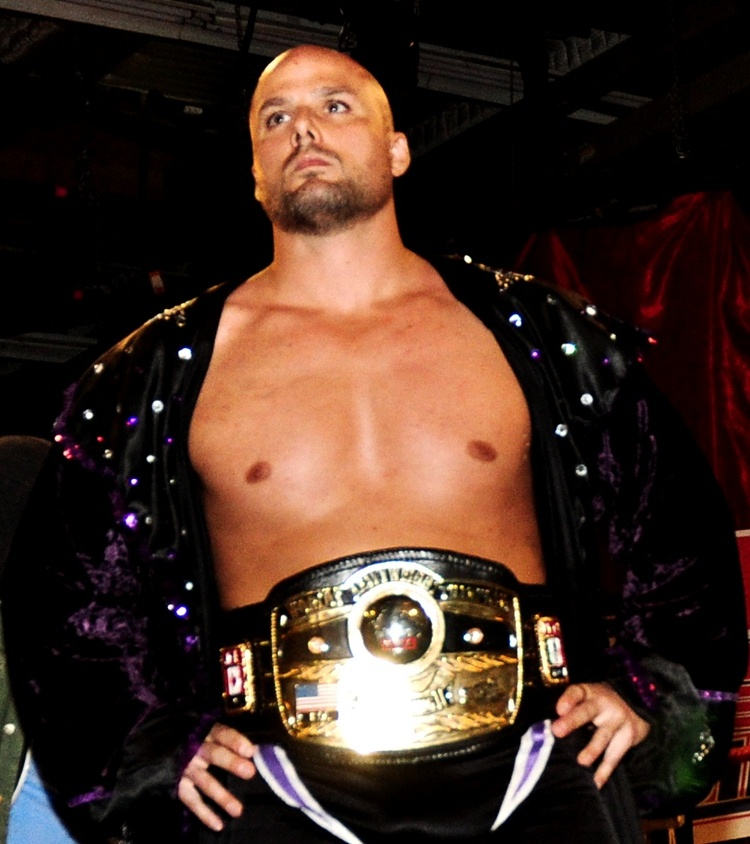
Adam Pearce is a 5-time NWA World Heavyweight Champion

In August 2012, International Wrestling Corp, LLC, a holding company run by Houston-based attorney and wrestling promoter R. Bruce Tharpe, sued the NWA, two of its recent Executive Directors (Robert Trobich and David Baucom) and its then-parent company, Pro Wrestling Organization LLC, claiming insurance fraud regarding the NWA's liability insurance policy. A settlement was negotiated that transferred the rights to the NWA from Pro Wrestling Organization LLC to International Wrestling Corp, LLC. After 64 years, the new organization moved from a membership model to a licensing model, licensing the NWA brand name to wrestling promotions which caused many promotions to immediately cut ties with the NWA, including some of the largest remaining NWA affiliated promotions.

With Cabana and Pearce even at three victories in their “Seven Levels of Hate” series, the final match was scheduled for October 27, 2012, in Melbourne, Australia, at an NWA Warzone Wrestling event. Pearce wanted the NWA to sanction the match as a world title match, as they had done earlier. The NWA, however, refused to do this and did not want Pearce and Cabana to go forward with the match. They did anyway, with Cabana winning the match. Pearce and Cabana both broke kayfabe after the match, with Pearce saying that Cabana was the rightful champion and Cabana saying that he did not want the title as it was about the past and he was about the future. Pearce declared he did not want the title either and left it in the ring as the two exited the arena.

=== Lightning One (2017–present) ===
On May 1, 2017, Billy Corgan's company, Lightning One, Inc., purchased the National Wrestling Alliance (NWA), including its name, rights, trademarks, and championships. Corgan's ownership took effect on October 1, 2017. At that point, all existing NWA affiliation agreements were ended and all NWA championships, except the NWA World Heavyweight Championship (renamed the NWA World's Heavyweight Championship) and the NWA World Women's Championship, would be vacated in the months following the acquisition.

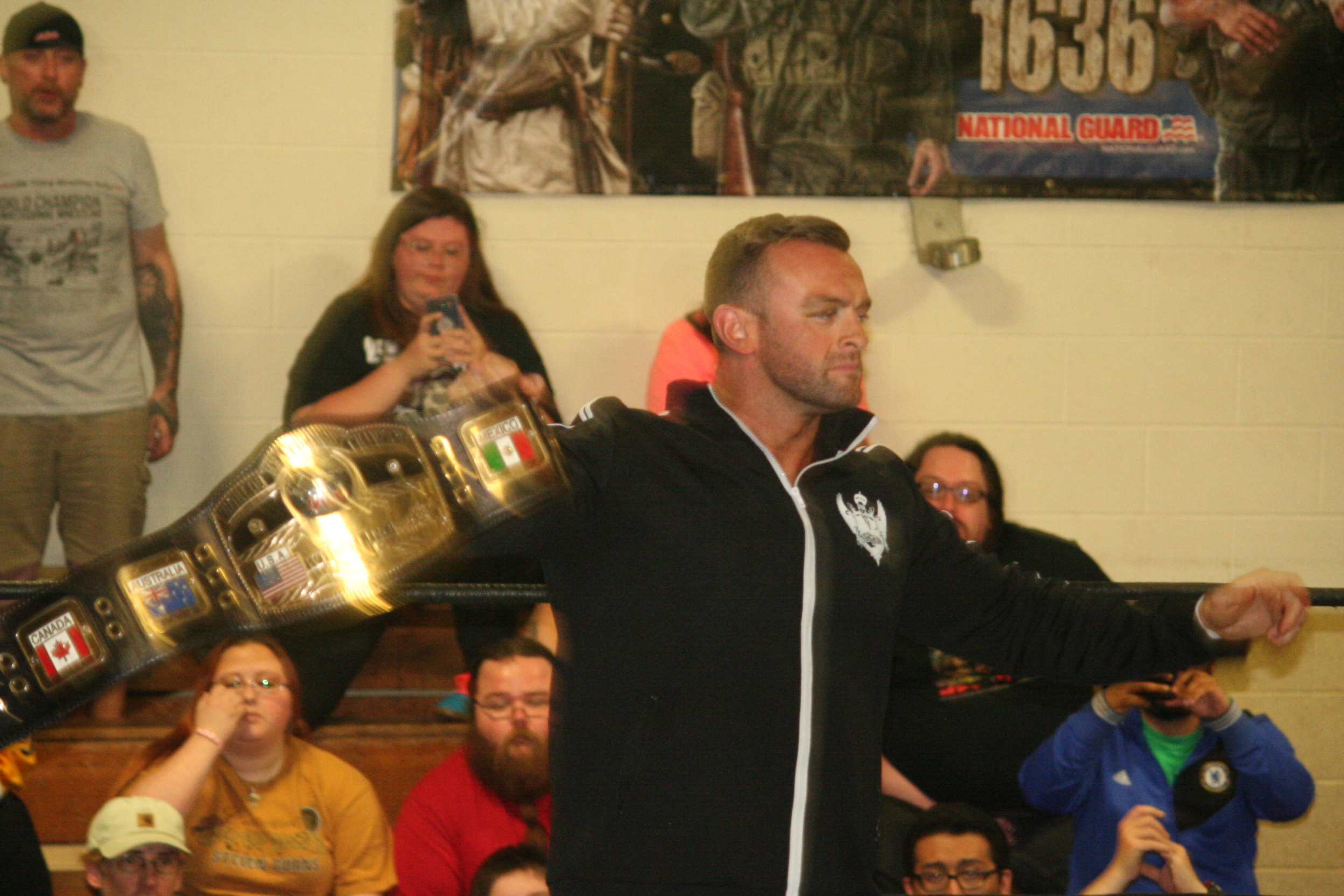
Nick Aldis is a 2-time NWA World's Heavyweight Champion

On October 20, 2017, the NWA debuted the YouTube series, Ten Pounds of Gold, focused primarily around the NWA World's Heavyweight Champion at the time Tim Storm, chronicling his travels across the United States, and defenses of the championship. Continuing to operate as a governing body, Billy Corgan's NWA worked collaboratively with various promotions to sanction Storm's championship matches.

On December 9, 2017, Nick Aldis won the championship from Storm on a Combat Zone Wrestling show. Since the championship change, Ten Pounds of Gold focused on "The Aldis Crusade", a series of 20 title defenses over the course of 60 days in the spring of 2018 and concluding with a title defense against Colt Cabana in Wenzhou, China.

Ten Pounds of Gold, together with the Being The Elite web series produced by The Young Bucks, then focused on the build towards a championship match between Aldis and Cody as part of the All In supercard event on September 1, 2018, where Cody would win the match and the championship. Ten Pounds of Gold continued to cover subsequent defenses at the NWA 70th Anniversary Show, the New Year's Clash pop-up event, and the 2019 Crockett Cup.

By July 2019, the NWA would begin to transition into a singular wrestling promotion, with the NWA announcing television tapings in Atlanta for a new standalone weekly series. The series was later revealed as NWA Powerrr, which has since hosted occasional NWA World's Heavyweight Championship matches.

During the October 15, 2019 episode of Powerrr, it was announced that the NWA would be holding a pay-per-view (PPV) called Into the Fire on December 14, 2019. This would be the first PPV event produced exclusively by the NWA without another promotion or production company's involvement. At the event, NWA World's Heavyweight Champion Nick Aldis defeated James Storm to remain the champion.

== Belt designs ==
There have been six belt designs used to represent the NWA World's Heavyweight Championship.

=== 1948–1949 ===
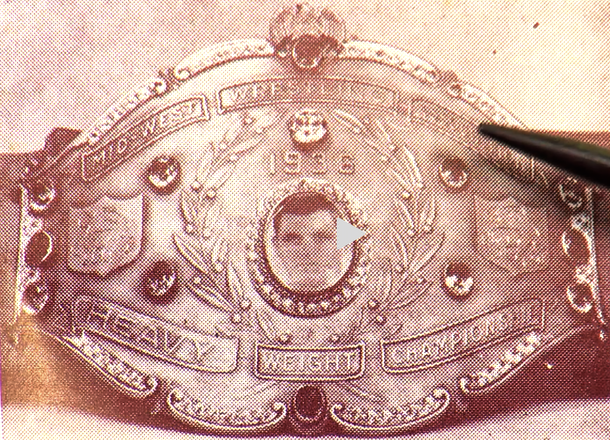
The Original design of the NWA World's Heavyweight Championship only held by Orville Brown from 1948-1949.

The first design was only held by the very first NWA World's Heavyweight Champion, Orville Brown. This belt consisted of one metal plate with a picture frame at the center. It had gemstones of various sizes around the edges of the belt, with the center featuring larger stones. The belt was retired after Orville's accident, and it remains with the Brown family. A similar belt design has been used by the NWA World Women's Championship since 2019.

=== 1949–1959 ===
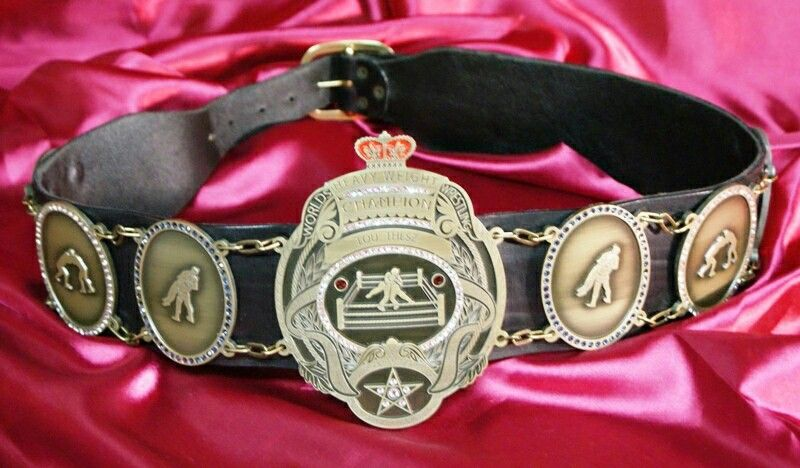
The second version of the NWA World's Heavyweight Championship used from 1949-1959.

The second design is often referred to as the "Lou Thesz Belt". The championship belt, which was a holdover from Thesz's reign as the National Wrestling Association's champion, consisted of seven plates and a leather strap. The main plate had a royal crown, a wrestling ring, and a five-pointed star in a vertical alignment, top to bottom down the center. A belt with a similar design was given to Rikidōzan when he defeated Thesz in 1958 to claim the NWA International Heavyweight Championship, which Rikidōzan in turn held until his death in 1963. Rikidōzan's NWA International Heavyweight Championship design subsequently inspired the designs of All Japan Pro Wrestling's PWF World Heavyweight Championship and the main plate of the later Triple Crown Heavyweight Championship belt. In 1992, Thesz lent the original "Lou Thesz Belt" to the Union of Professional Wrestling Forces International (UWFi) to represent their Pro-Wrestling World Heavyweight Championship. Nobuhiko Takada and Super Vader were the only wrestlers to hold the belt in UWFi, as Thesz withdrew from UWFi in 1995 due to his disagreement over the company co-promoting with New Japan Pro-Wrestling, taking the belt with him.

=== 1959–1973 ===
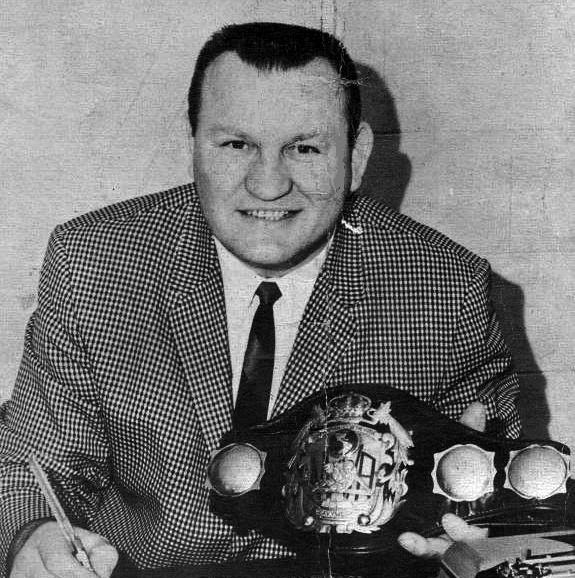
Gene Kiniski with the belt's third design: "Crown Belt" (1959–1973)

The third design is sometimes referred to as the "Crown Belt". It had a prominent royal crown at its top, a globe underneath it, and the letters "NWA" horizontally across the center behind two wrestlers. The design was later used to represent the NWA United National Championship (which later became part of the Triple Crown Heavyweight Championship), the Japanese version of the NWA North American Tag Team Championship, the championships of Blue Demon Jr.'s NWA Mexico territory, the Tenryu Project's United National Tag Team Championship, and the current version of the NWA World Junior Heavyweight Championship.

=== 1973–1986, 1994–present ===
The fourth design is commonly referred to as the "Ten Pounds of Gold" or the “Domed Globe Belt”. It is the design most commonly identified with the title. It has also been referred to on Championship Wrestling from Hollywood, NWA Powerrr, and in other NWA-related media as "Sweet Charlotte", a nickname coined by Adam Pearce in 2008 as a nod to the hometown of Ric Flair, one of the belt's most famous holders. The original Ten Pounds of Gold belt was made in 1973 by an unidentified jeweler in Mexico – similar belts were made for the NWA's Mexican-based World Light Heavyweight, Middleweight and Welterweight titles.

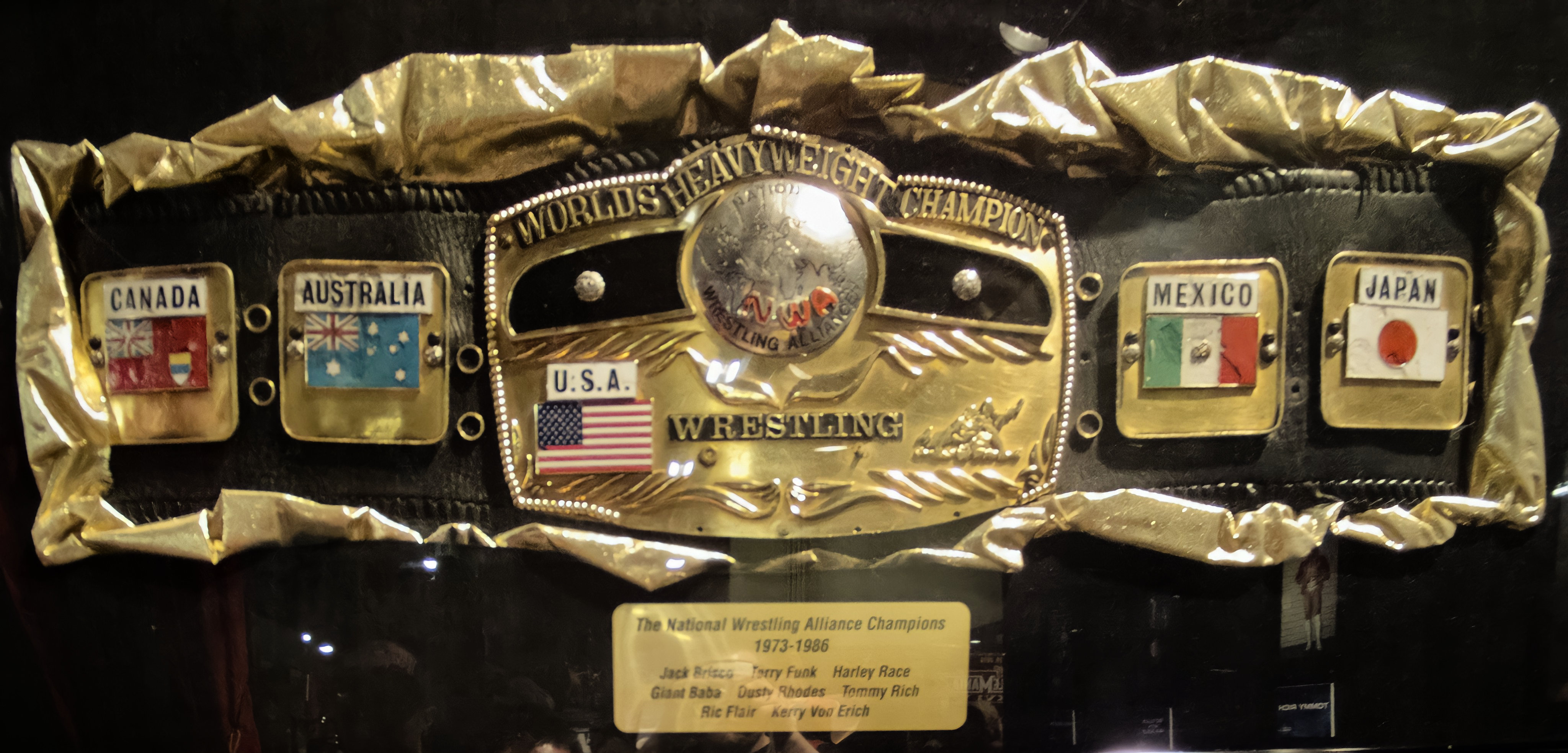
The 1973-1986 version of the "Ten Pounds of Gold" Belt. The current version is slightly modified

The Domed Globe NWA World Heavyweight title featured the flag of the United States on its main plate, as well as those of Mexico, Canada, Australia, and Japan on its side plates. The second side plate on the left side of the belt featured a modified version of the older Canadian Red Ensign rather than the official Canadian flag, the Maple Leaf, which had been adopted in 1965. The belt originally had a red suede/velvet strap along with a nameplate. The nameplate was only used once, by Jack Brisco, before it was removed from the design. The red leather strap was replaced with a black laced leather strap soon into Brisco's reign due to the material lacking durability. The original Domed Globe Belt was retired in 1986; Ric Flair retained possession of the original belt. It is currently located at WWE's Connecticut headquarters. This design was revived in 1994 with a new belt that continues to represent the NWA World's Heavyweight Championship presently. In 2021, the NWA replaced the Australian flag side plate with a United Kingdom flag side plate, at the request of then-champion Nick Aldis. The Mexican-based lower weight classes Domed Globe championship belts featured the flag of Mexico on their main plates instead of the U.S. flag. From 1995 to 1997, the NWA World Junior Heavyweight Championship also had a Domed Globe design, as part of the J-Crown, with the U.S. flag in front; briefly during the 2010s, the NWA World Junior Heavyweight Championship once again had a Domed Globe design. During the mid-1990s, the NWA World Tag Team Championship was represented by Domed Globe belts, which were used during the NWA's partnership with IWA Japan. Numerous other championship belts have used the Domed Globe design, with some being NWA-sanctioned championships (such as the NWA Women's Pacific Championship) and others being unauthorized by the NWA (such as the FMW Brass Knuckles Heavyweight Championship).

=== 1986–1993 ===
The belt's fifth design: "Big Gold Belt" (1986–1993)

The fifth design is commonly referred to as the "Big Gold Belt". In 1985, Jim Crockett Jr. of Jim Crockett Promotions commissioned Charles Crumrine, a silversmith in Reno, Nevada specializing in rodeo-style belt buckles, to produce the new design. The belt made its debut in February 1986. When WCW left the NWA in 1993, the Big Gold Belt continued serving as the WCW International World Heavyweight Championship, then the WCW World Heavyweight Championship (which it is most commonly known for), and eventually as the World Heavyweight Championship in WWE, all the while bearing the name of neither the NWA, WCW, or any other promotion. Also in WWE, the Big Gold Belt was used in tandem to represent the then-Undisputed WWF Championship after the former WCW Championship was unified with the then-WWF World Championship in 2001, and then (now with a WWE logo included) in tandem to represent the WWE World Heavyweight Championship after the World Heavyweight Championship was unified with the WWE Championship in 2013. The Big Gold Belt was eventually retired in August 2014.

=== 1998 ===
The sixth design was a customized belt commissioned for Dan Severn during his first reign as NWA World's Heavyweight Champion, to celebrate the NWA's 50th anniversary. Severn would wear this version of the belt during his brief appearance on WWF television during a brief inter-promotional angle between the NWA and WWF.

== Reigns ==
The NWA currently recognizes 103 individual World's Heavyweight Championship reigns.

The inaugural champion was Orville Brown. The longest reigning champion is Lou Thesz, who held the title from November 27, 1949 to March 15, 1956, for a total of 2,300 days (6 years, 3 months, and 16 days); Thesz also holds the record for longest combined reign at 3,749 days. Shane Douglas has the record for the shortest reign as champion, for less than 1 day. Ric Flair holds the record for most reigns with 8, The youngest champion is Chris Candido who won the title at the age of 22, while the oldest champion is Tim Storm, who won it at the age of 51.

Silas Mason is the current champion in his first reign. He won the title by defeating Thom Latimer at NWA 77th Anniversary Show on August 16, 2025, in Huntington, New York.
