= Bearcat Wright =

American professional wrestler (1932–1982)

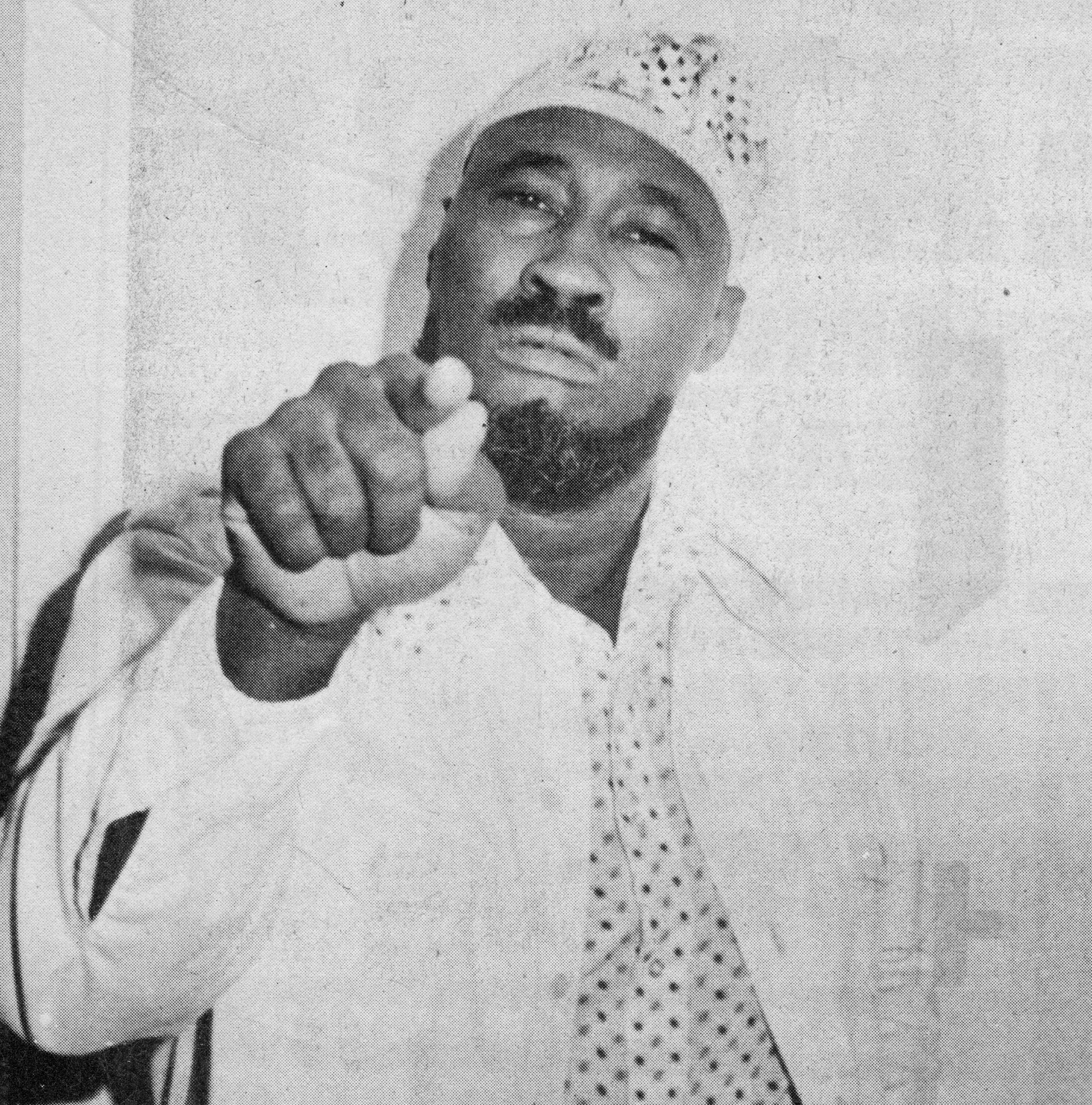
- Wright as a manager in 1975

Personal information
- Born: Edward A. Wright; January 13, 1932 Omaha, Nebraska, U.S.
- Died: August 28, 1982 (aged 50)

Professional wrestling career
- Ring name(s): Bearcat Wright; Bearcat Wright Jr. The Black Panther
- Billed height: 6 ft 6 in (198 cm)
- Billed weight: 260 lb (118 kg)
- Billed from: Kingston, Jamaica
- Debut: 1952
- Retired: 1975

Edward M. Wright (January 13, 1932 – August 28, 1982) better known by his ring name "Bearcat" Wright was an American professional wrestler who became popular in the late 1950s and 1960s. Despite racial tension in the United States, he became wildly popular as a babyface. Whether he was wrestling in either singles competition or in tag team competition (often matched with Bobo Brazil), thousands of fans would pack arenas to see him. He was the son of boxer Ed "Bearcat" Wright, and had an 8–0 record as a professional boxer himself in the early 1950s, boxing as "Bearcat Wright Jr."

== Professional wrestling career ==
The Arizona Wrestling Legends website says, "He was seen in Australia, in Canada, throughout the south, in the midwest, in Texas, always winning the support of the fans as he battled the likes of The Sheik, Johnny Valentine and Kinji Shibuya. A tall and lanky man, he was usually noted for flying dropkicks, spin kicks, and leaps off the rope." He adopted a "claw hold" for his finisher and was famous for desegregating wrestling.

Wright declared before an audience in Gary, Indiana, that he would no longer participate in segregated wrestling. Although suspended for a short time by the Indiana State Athletic Commission for his stand, shortly afterwards professional boxing desegregated. Bearcat Wright defeated Killer Kowalski in April 1961 to win the Big Time Pro Wrestling title and become, in effect, the world heavyweight wrestling champion.

Five days before Martin Luther King Jr. delivered his famous "I have a dream" speech in Washington, D.C., Wright won the WWA World Heavyweight Championship from "Classy" Freddie Blassie in Los Angeles, California. Known for behemoth strength (he would rip phone books in half during promotional interviews for his matches) he also was blackballed by Worldwide Wrestling Associates for refusing to drop the WWA championship to Edouard Carpentier and then back to Fred Blassie on December 13, 1963. He is one of the few wrestlers who legitimately would not drop their title—and so WWA had Gene LeBell (a known judo champion and shooter—or one who knew how to legitimately wrestle to defend themselves if needed) to substitute for Blassie at a rematch. When Wright refused to enter the ring, WWA stripped him of his title and awarded it to Carpentier.

Although Wright created controversy, promoters soon forgot about his negative sides. Wright continued to draw money and wrestled even into the 1970s.

On March 31, 2017, Wright was posthumously inducted into the WWE Hall of Fame as a part of the Legacy wing.

== Death ==
Wright died at the age of 50 on August 28, 1982, from sickle cell anemia complications.

== Championships and accomplishments ==
- 50th State Big Time Wrestling
  - NWA Hawaii Tag Team Championship (2 times) – with Luther Lindsay and Sam Steamboat
- Big Time Wrestling (Boston)
  - BTW Heavyweight Championship (1 time)
- Big Time Wrestling (San Francisco)
  - NWA United States Championship (San Francisco version) (2 times)
- Championship Wrestling from Florida
  - NWA Brass Knuckles Championship (Florida version) (1 time)
  - NWA Florida Tag Team Championship (1 time) – with Bobby Shane
- Midwest Wrestling Association
  - MWA Ohio Heavyweight Championship (1 time)
- NWA All-Star Wrestling
  - NWA Canadian Tag Team Championship (Vancouver version) (1 time) – with Enrique Torres
  - NWA Pacific Coast Tag Team Championship (Vancouver version) (1 time) – with Whipper Billy Watson
- Pacific Northwest Wrestling
  - NWA Pacific Northwest Tag Team Championship (3 times) – with Shag Thomas (2) and Billy White Wolf
- World Championship Wrestling (Australia)
  - IWA World Heavyweight Championship (2 times)
  - IWA World Tag Team Championship (1 time) – with Mark Lewin
- Worldwide Wrestling Associates
  - WWA World Heavyweight Championship (1 time)
  - WWA International Television Tag Team Championship (1 time) – Mr. Moto
- WWE
  - WWE Hall of Fame (Class of 2017)
- Wrestling Observer Newsletter
  - Wrestling Observer Newsletter Hall of Fame (Class of 2019)
- Other titles:
  - Arizona Heavyweight Championship (1 time)
  - World Negro Heavyweight Championship (1 time)
