= Frank Scarpa =

American professional wrestler (1915–1969)

Personal information
- Born: Francis Scarpa; September 28, 1915 Boston, Massachusetts, U.S.
- Died: January 25, 1969 (aged 53) Boston, Massachusetts, U.S.

Professional wrestling career
- Ring name(s): Frank Scarpa; Manuel Garza; Manuel Cortez; Ricardo Cortez; Gino Martinelli
- Billed height: 6 ft 0 in (183 cm)
- Billed weight: 251 lb (114 kg)
- Trained by: Fred Myerson
- Debut: 1936

Frank Scarpa (September 28, 1915 – January 25, 1969) was an American professional wrestler. While best known for his time with Big Time Wrestling, where he held the Boston-version of the World Heavyweight Championship, Scarpa spent the majority of his career as a journeyman competing across Canada and the United States.

As Manuel Garza, he was a major star in the Los Angeles wrestling territory in the 1950s and won the NWA International Television Championship in 1957. According to wrestling historian Tom Burke, Scarpa set a record by selling out the Olympic Auditorium for 18 weeks in a row. Santos eventually returned to New England spending the final years of his career as the region's top star.

== Death ==
On January 25, 1969, Scarpa suffered a heart attack one day after wrestling at the Jack Witschi Arena in North Attleboro - a Best 3-out-of-5 Falls match with Chief Eagle versus BTW U.S. Heavyweight Champion Gypsy Joe and Malcolm Cormier, which Scarpa's team won. He was sent to Boston City Hospital where he died. He was 53.

== Championships and accomplishments ==
- Big Time Wrestling
  - BTW World Heavyweight Championship (1 time)
  - BTW United States Heavyweight Championship (5 times)
- NWA Los Angeles
  - NWA International Television Championship (1 time)
