= Buddy Lee Attractions =

Buddy Lee Attractions was a music booking agency based in Nashville, TN. It was in continuous operation and owned by the Lee family for over 50 years.

During its time in business the company represented, at different times, Garth Brooks, The Dixie Chicks, George Strait, Willie Nelson, Florida Georgia Line, and Jason Aldean. On September 21, 2018, it was announced that the company had decided to shut down and reopen at a later time.
