= WWA World Heavyweight Championship (Los Angeles) =

Professional wrestling championship

Details
- Promotion: Worldwide Wrestling Associates
- Date established: June 14, 1957
- Date retired: December 18, 1968

Other name
- World Heavyweight Championship
Statistics
- First champion: Édouard Carpentier
- Most reigns: Freddie Blassie (four)
- Longest reign: Édouard Carpentier (1,459 days)
- Shortest reign: Freddie Blassie (two days)

The WWA World Heavyweight Championship, was a professional wrestling world heavyweight championship in the Los Angeles, California-based Worldwide Wrestling Associates (WWA). The title was established as an offshoot of the NWA World Heavyweight Championship when Édouard Carpentier became recognized as world champion in Los Angeles, when the promotion was then known as the North American Wrestling Alliance. The championship was renamed with the promotion in 1961, and was abandoned in 1968 after WWA joined the NWA and was renamed NWA Hollywood Wrestling.

There were multiple world titles contested in Indianapolis' World Wrestling Association, the World Wrestling Association in Mexico and in the World Wrestling Association of Korea, which are all omonime promotions of the original WWA and which all consider themselves to be the true WWA or its true heir.

== Title history ==
Key
No.	Overall reign number
Reign	Reign number for the specific champion
Days	Number of days held

No.	Champion	Championship change			Reign statistics		Notes	Ref.
No.	Champion	Date	Event	Location	Reign	Days	Notes	Ref.
1	Édouard Carpentier	June 14, 1957	WWA show	Chicago, Illinois	1	1,459	Defeated Lou Thesz by disqualification to become the National Wrestling Alliance world champion. He lost the NWA title by disqualification to Thesz on July 24, 1957. Some NWA territories (which then became Worldwide Wrestling Associates) didn't recognize the title change and thus the WWA World title was born.	
2	Freddie Blassie	June 12, 1961	WWA show	Los Angeles, California	1	289	He won the title when Carpentier was declared unable to continue in third fall.	
3	Rikidōzan	March 28, 1962	WWA show	Los Angeles, California	1	119		
4	Freddie Blassie	July 25, 1962	WWA show	Los Angeles, California	2	2		
5	The Destroyer	July 27, 1962	WWA show	San Diego, California	1	287		
6	Freddie Blassie	May 10, 1963	WWA show	Los Angeles, California	3	105		
7	Bearcat Wright	August 23, 1963	WWA show	Los Angeles, California	1	115	Wins by countout. First black wrestler to hold a world title in professional wrestling.	
8	Édouard Carpentier	December 16, 1963	WWA show	Indio, California	2	45	Wins by forfeit when Wright no-shows a scheduled defense.	
9	Freddie Blassie	January 30, 1964	WWA show	Los Angeles, California	4	83		
10	Dick the Bruiser	April 22, 1964	WWA show	Los Angeles, California	1	91		
11	The Destroyer	July 22, 1964	WWA show	Los Angeles, California	2	50	Dick the Bruiser didn't acknowledge his defeat against The Destroyer, claiming to be the true WWA champion and starting World Wrestling Association (Indianapolis) as the first WWA World Heavyweight Championship (Indianapolis) holder.	
12	Bob Ellis	September 10, 1964	WWA show	Los Angeles, California	1	64		
13	The Destroyer	November 13, 1964	WWA show	San Diego, California	3	119		
†	Toyonobori	December 12, 1964	JWA show	Tokyo, Japan	1		Toyonobori defeated The Destroyer in a JWA card, but the title change was not recognized by WWA. However Toyonobori was recognized as the legitimate champion in the JWA. To put an end to the controversy Luke Graham, the champion recognized by WWA, defeated Toyonobori, the champion recognized by the JWA, on September 20, 1965, in Los Angeles (below).	
14	Pedro Morales	March 12, 1965	WWA show	Los Angeles, California	1	133	Defeats The Destroyer	
15	Luke Graham	July 23, 1965	WWA show	Los Angeles, California	1	86	Recognized as legitimate champion by WWA, defeated Toyonobori, recognized by the Japanese Wrestling Association as the true champion, on September 20, 1965, in Los Angeles to put an end to the controversy on the legitimate title holder.	
16	Pedro Morales	October 17, 1965	WWA show	Los Angeles, California	2	292		
17	Buddy Austin	August 5, 1966	WWA show	Los Angeles, California	1	28		
18	Bobo Brazil	September 2, 1966	WWA show	Los Angeles, California	1	14		
19	Buddy Austin	September 16, 1966	WWA show	Los Angeles, California	2	28		
20	Lou Thesz	October 14, 1966	WWA show	Los Angeles, California	1	14		
21	Mark Lewin	October 28, 1966	WWA show	Los Angeles, California	1	193		
22	Kim Il	May 9, 1967	WWA show	Seoul, South Korea	1	66		
23	Mike DiBiase	July 14, 1967	WWA show	Los Angeles, California	1	42		
24	Buddy Austin	August 25, 1967	WWA show	Los Angeles, California	3	140		
25	Bobo Brazil	January 12, 1968	WWA show	Los Angeles, California	2	341	On October 1, 1968, WWA joined the National Wrestling Alliance. To determine the unified world champion Gene Kiniski, the NWA world champion, wrestled Brazil to a draw on December 18, 1968, in Los Angeles. Kiniski was therefore recognized the true champion and the WWA World title was merge with the NWA World title.	
—	Deactivated	December 18, 1968	WWA show	—	—	—		

== See also ==
- List of early world heavyweight champions in professional wrestling
