= Andy Russell (singer) =

American singer (1919–1992)

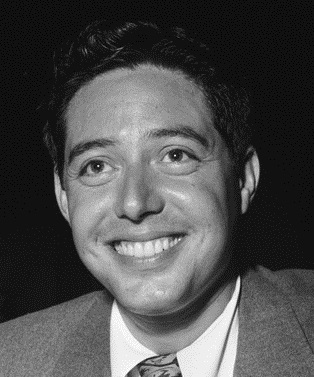
- Russell in 1947
- Born: Andrés Rábago Pérez; September 16, 1919; Los Angeles, California, U.S.
- Died: April 16, 1992 (aged 72); Sun City, Arizona, U.S.
- Occupations: Vocalist; Percussionist; Radio host Radio actor and singer Television singer Motion picture actor and singer Television variety show host Nightclub singer
- Years active: 1934–1989
- Spouses: Evelyn Marie Morse (m. 1940; div. 1945); Della Russell (m. 1945; div. 1954); Velia Sánchez Belmont (m. 1954; div. 1961); Virginia "Ginny" Pace (m. 1967; div. 1987); Doris E. Russell
- Musical career
- Genres: Traditional pop, Latin music, big band, swing, easy listening
- Instruments: Vocals, drums
- Labels: Capitol, RCA Victor, Orfeon, Belter/Divusca

Andy Russell (born Andrés Rábago Pérez; September 16, 1919 – April 16, 1992) was an American popular singer, actor, and entertainer. He specialized in traditional pop and Latin music. He sold 8 million records in the 1940s wherein he sang bilingually in English and Spanish. His most successful songs included "Bésame Mucho", "Amor", and "What a Diff'rence a Day Made". He made appearances and performed on radio programs, most notably Your Hit Parade, in several movies, and on television.

In 1954, he relocated to Mexico where he became a star of radio, television, motion pictures, records, and nightclubs. He toured extensively throughout Latin America, Spain, and Portugal and hosted the television variety show El Show de Andy Russell in Argentina from 1956 to 1965.

Russell continued to record after he returned to the United States. His 1967 single "It's Such a Pretty World Today" reached #1 on the Easy Listening chart in Billboard Magazine. In later years, Russell performed internationally, occasionally recorded new songs, and made television appearances. Although these were well received, he did not regain his previous level of success.

During his career, Russell received many international accolades and awards, most notably being recognized as the original Latino crossover artist who introduced American audiences to popular songs sung in English and Spanish, thus opening the doors for later Hispanic bilingual artists to do the same. Through a fusion of musical styles, rhythms, and languages, he created music that appealed to diverse audiences, becoming one of the first cross-cultural, multinational musical artists.

== Early life ==
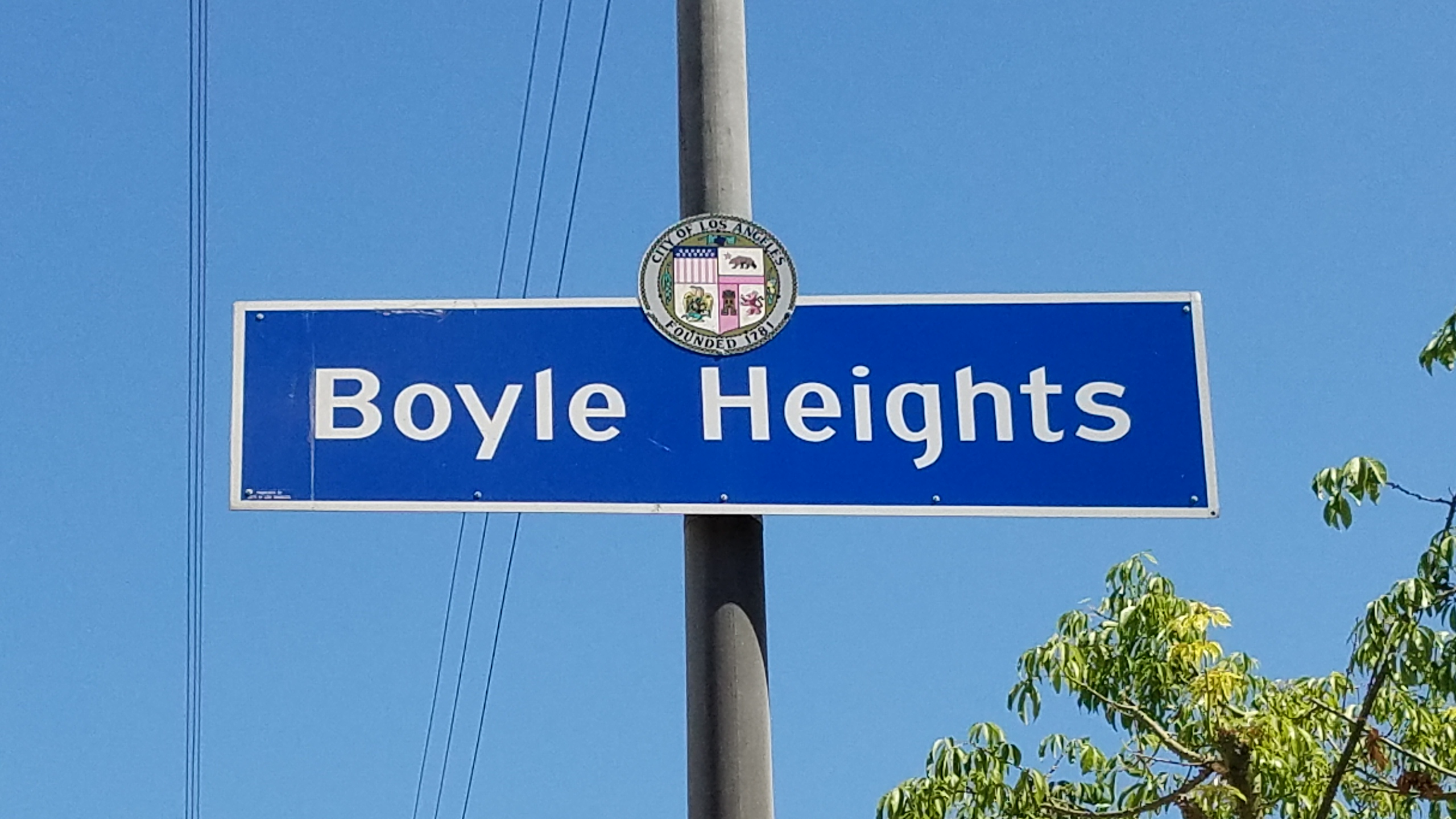
Russell was born in Boyle Heights, Los Angeles, California

Russell was born September 16, 1919, as Andrés Rábago Pérez in Boyle Heights, which, at the time, was an ethnically integrated, middle-class neighborhood in Eastside Los Angeles. He was the second youngest of ten children (eight boys, two girls) born to Mexican immigrant parents, Rafael Rábago and Vicenta (née Pérez), who had emigrated to United States in 1902 from the Mexican states of Durango and Chihuahua, where each had been born, respectively. His father was employed as an extra by Hollywood studios, while his mother was a housewife.

As a child, he loved listening to American popular music and Big Band, such as Benny Goodman, Glenn Miller and Tommy Dorsey. He idolized crooners Dick Powell, Bing Crosby, and Jack Leonard. He went wild over popular music, knew all the hit tunes, and was the neighborhood authority on every name band leader in the country. While attending school, he also worked as a newspaper vendor at a corner in downtown L.A.

He grew up in a bilingual home, hearing and speaking Spanish with his parents, while speaking English with his siblings and people outside of the home. His parents enjoyed listening to Mexican music, in particular, mariachi. At this young age, Russell did not appreciate the music of Mexico, nor did he fully comprehend the Spanish language. He felt so frustrated that he would ask his parents to speak to him in English. Moreover, he was able to learn only a little Spanish because his parents died when he was just 11 years old. His older brothers helped to raise the family.

In 1934, as a 15-year-old student in junior high school, he began his career by singing with a local swing band headed by don Ramón Cruz. This band was composed mainly of Mexican and Mexican American musicians and played primarily in East Los Angeles. He also sang with the Stan Kenton Orchestra, and other groups, until one day he was told that he also would have to play an instrument to stay with the band. Russell recalled how he dealt with this dilemma:

Andy Russell performs a drum solo in the 1945 film The Stork Club

They said to me one night and broke my heart, they says, "Andy, we can't afford to have you as just a singer. You've got to play some instrument." I said, "But, gee, I'm a singer." And they said, "Yeah, we're paying you two dollars, two-fifty a night and it's too much. You know, the guys wanna split the rest of the money." So I said, "What can I learn in a hurry so I can join the band? ... Drums would be the easiest thing." So I got a bunch of the old records and started to learn to play drums. Down in the cellar, I'd learn to play drums and keep good time. This was when I was in junior high and I was learning to play drums. Later on, I got a teacher to teach me how to read, and before you knew it, I took drums seriously and I became one of the top drummers on the east side of L.A. – swing drummers. And I was playing drums with all these bands and then I'd sing.

— Source, Loza, Steven. 1993.Barrio Rhythm: Mexican American Music in Los Angeles, University of Illinois Press., p. 144

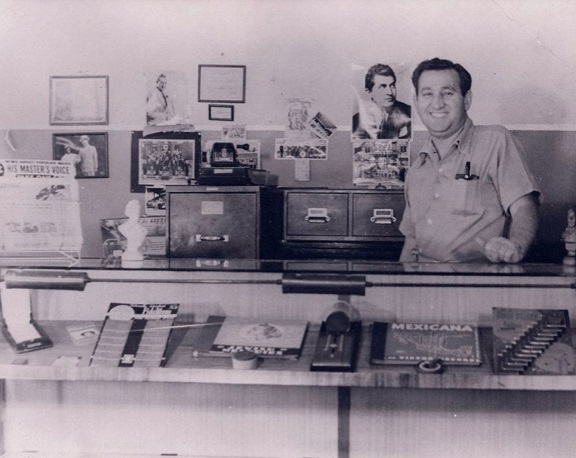
Bill Phillips, owner of Phillips Music Company, gave Russell drum lessons.

Russell took drum lessons for 50 cents a lesson at the Phillips Music Company on Brooklyn Avenue (now Avenida César Chávez) in Boyle Heights. This neighborhood music store was owned by William Phillips, a Jewish-American Navy veteran, drummer, and musician. By practicing in the basement of his house and during breaks at his part-time job, he quickly became an excellent drummer.

Stella Cruz, the sister of bandleader don Ramón Cruz, recalled in a YouTube video that Russell, as a child, had contracted polio and had some paralysis in his left arm and leg. When this came to the attention of don Ramón Cruz, he taught Russell to play the bass drum in order to strengthen those muscles. This may have been Russell's initial exposure to the instrument.

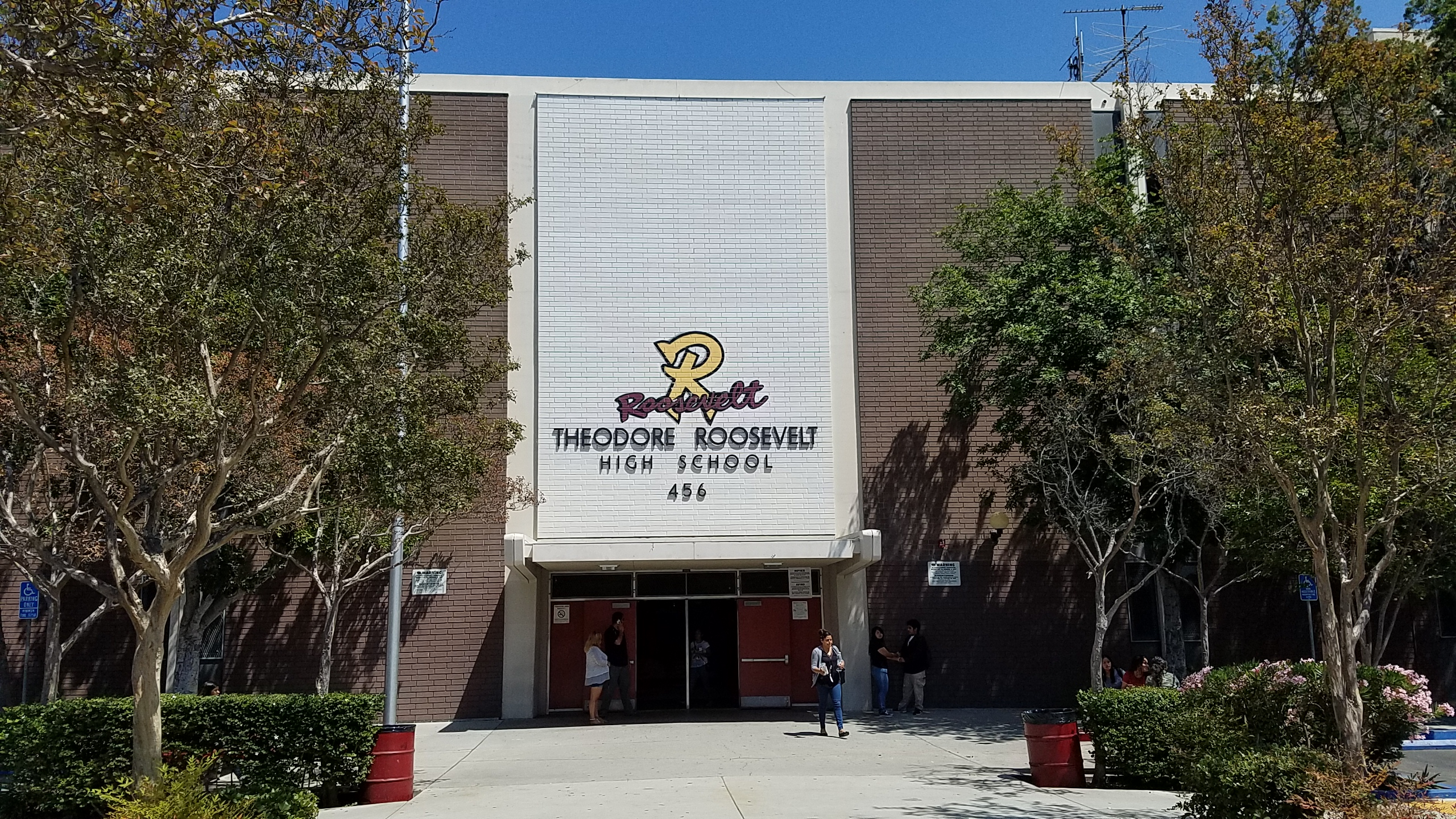
Russell attended Roosevelt High School.

Russell attended Roosevelt High School in Boyle Heights, where he continued his musical education. He was a member of the ROTC marching band, the jazz band, and the high school symphony orchestra. He performed at high school football games, parades and dances. And under the instruction of Mr. Harry Gruppengetter, the music teacher, he learned to read music. He also enjoyed playing handball and boxing.

He recalled that his high school experience was positive, and that he did not feel discrimination: "In those days, I was just one of the guys. We had Russian people, we had Jewish kids, we had Mexican kids, we had the blacks, we never noticed things like that ... I'm a very cocky little Mexican kid from the East Side, and I never had those feelings. I always feel that it's up to the person." In 1935, at the age of 16, when Russell discovered that Gus Arnheim was looking for a drummer, he left high school the summer before his senior year to try and join his band.

== New singing style and name ==
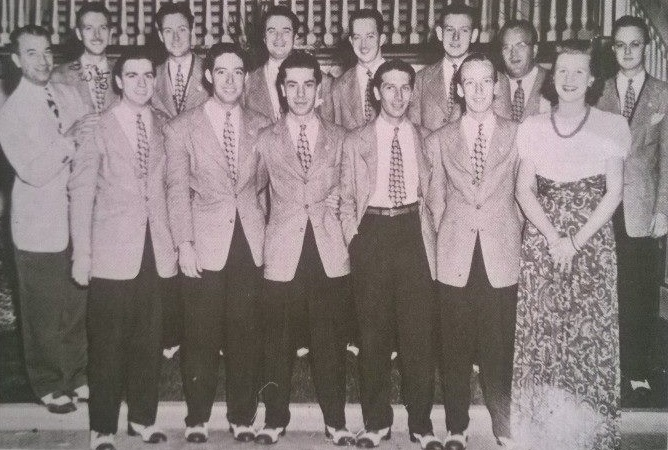
Gus Arnheim Orchestra with Russell circa 1940

Gus Arnheim and his orchestra had been playing the Cocoanut Grove and the Ambassador Hotel in Los Angeles since the late 1920s and had employed such singers as Bing Crosby, Russ Columbo, and Woody Herman. Russell auditioned for Arnheim and got the job not only as a drummer but vocalist, too. However, since he was underage and could not tour out of state, Arnheim adopted him and became his legal guardian.

In addition, since he thought it was a good gimmick that made good business sense, Arnheim suggested that Russell sing bilingually in English and Spanish. Russell was hesitant, stating "No, Gus, my Spanish is very bad; I'm embarrassed." Arnheim finally convinced the youngster by saying "Do something different and people will notice." Russell agreed.

Russell sings bilingually in Breakfast in Hollywood (1946).

Now on tour with the band, Russell noticed that when he played solo on the drums or sang bilingually, the couples in the audience would stop dancing and approach the bandstand to get a better look at the vocalist who was singing in a different language. It was at a show at the Peabody Hotel in Memphis, Tennessee, that Arnheim saw that he was getting known. But Arnheim realized that it would be necessary for Russell to change his name.

Russell recalled the conversation with Arnheim after the show:

"Andy, I've got to tell you something. The name Rábago has got to go. [laughs] Rábago's gotta go." I says, "What do you mean?" He says, "I've gotta change your name. Rábago hasn't got that ring to it, you know?" I says, "But that's my name." He says, "Look, we'll keep Andy, all right?" I says, "Okay. So what would you call me then?" He says, "I used to have a singer, a famous singer, a fella that took Bing Crosby's place years ago. His name was Russell Columbo, one of the famous singers of that era. I'm gonna call you Russell – Andy Russell."

— Source, Loza, Steven. 1993.Barrio Rhythm: Mexican American Music in Los Angeles, University of Illinois Press., p. 146

Russell compromised on the name change because during that era many performers adopted stage names in order to enter the entertainment industry. He did not want to be discriminated against and stereotyped as only a Latin singer. Besides, he felt the public would know his ethnic background by his singing in Spanish and by telling everybody he was Mexican.

In contrast, the case has been made that Russell's light-skin and European features (like Vikki Carr) were the determining factors in opening the doors to the recording industry (Avant-Mier, 59; Macias, 125) that otherwise shut out Mexican-Americans whose appearance was dark-complexioned, like contemporary Chicano musician and singer Lalo Guerrero, who "wanted the success of an Andy Russell, whose appearance and name change were definite advantages." Loza notes: "in that particular era (and even today), name changing was common among performers, so that whether names have been changed for ethnic reasons cannot always be determined."

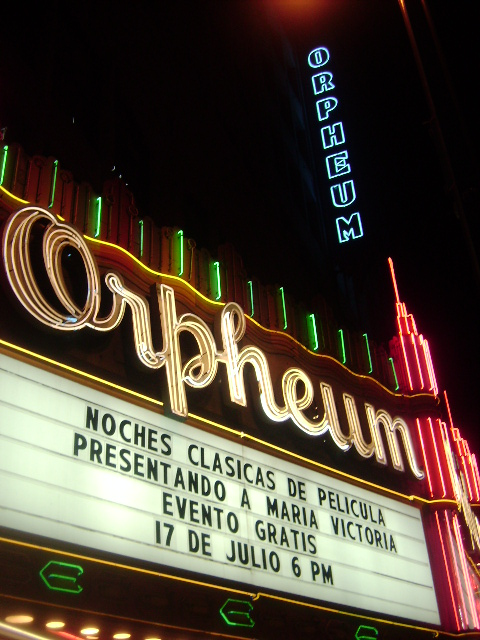
Russell performed at the Orpheum Theater, Los Angeles.

Russell performed as bilingual vocalist and swing drummer with Arnheim for 4 years. During this period, he received offers from Paul Whiteman, Jimmy Dorsey, Glenn Miller, Charlie Spivak, and such bands as Johnny Richards, Sonny Dunham, Alvino Rey and Vido Musso. Russell's popularity grew to the point that band leader Tommy Dorsey made him an offer to play only the drums, as he already had a singer, a young Frank Sinatra. Russell declined because "he decided he could make more of a name if he concentrated on his singing," so he chose to join Alvino Rey. Some of the venues in the Los Angeles area where he played were the Cocoanut Grove at the Ambassador Hotel on Wilshire Boulevard, the old Follies Theater on Main Street, the Orpheum Theater on Broadway, the Santa Monica Pier, and Joe Zucca's Show Case in Hermosa Beach.

== Career begins ==
=== Records ===
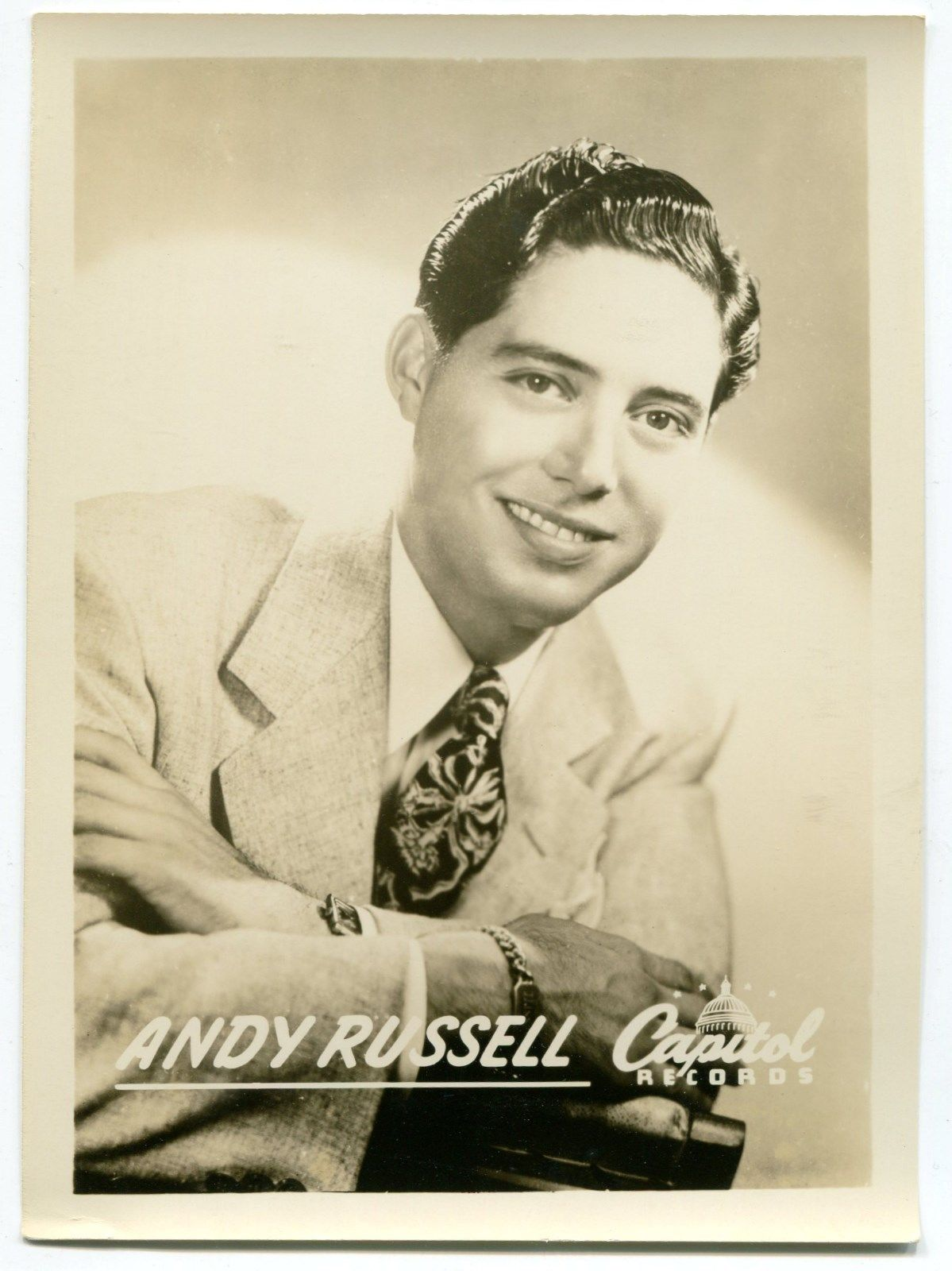
Capitol Records recording artist Andy Russell

While he was singing with the Alvino Rey Orchestra, Russell's bilingual vocals had caught the attention of lyricist and composer Johnny Mercer, who asked him to cut a record for his fledgling Capitol Records.

However, the 1942–44 musicians' strike threatened to derail Russell's career before it had even begun. Union President James Petrillo had set the date of July 31 where no union musician could record for any record company. This caused record producers to scramble to get vocalists and musicians into recording studios to get the recordings done before the deadline. Russell was able to make a test record with the George Siravo orchestra under the deadline. Mercer paid him $150-$175 for both sides of his first record.

Russell narrowed his choices down to three songs and then chose the bolero "Bésame Mucho" (English title: "Kiss Me Much"), with original music and Spanish lyric by Mexican composer Consuelo Velázquez, English lyric by American composer Sunny Skylar, and backing by the Al Sack Orchestra. He sang "Bésame Mucho" bilingually, the first vocalist to offer Spanish and English treatments to popular songs, often with a chorus in English followed by a chorus in Spanish, and, in doing so, displaying his Latin background.

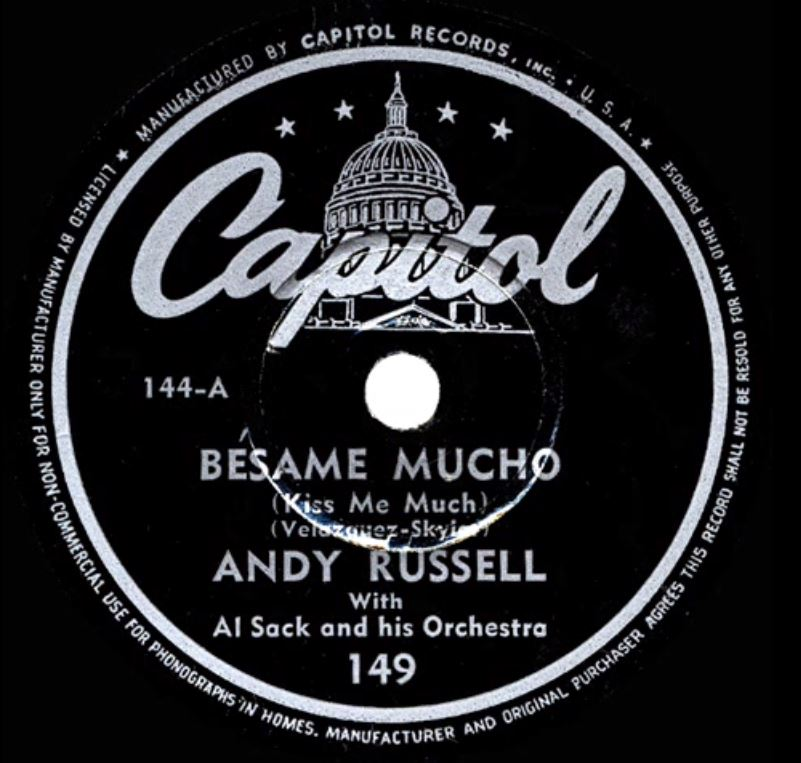
Russell's debut single "Bésame Mucho" on Capitol Records 1944.

"Bésame Mucho" became Russell's first charted hit. It entered the charts on April 15, 1944, and peaked at #10 on the Billboard Chart in the United States, staying on the charts for 5 weeks. It sold over one million copies. Composer Velázquez heaped huge praise on Russell by stating that the worldwide success of "Bésame Mucho", which would become the most recorded Mexican song in history, effectively began with his rendition and recording of the song.

That same year he also had another huge hit, which became another signature tune: "Amor", music by Mexican composer Gabriel Ruiz, Spanish lyric by Mexican lyricist Ricardo López Méndez, English lyric by Sunny Skylar, and backed by the Al Sack Orchestra. It entered the charts on June 1, 1944, peaked at #5, and stayed on the charts for 10 weeks. The song was featured in the motion picture Broadway Rhythm.

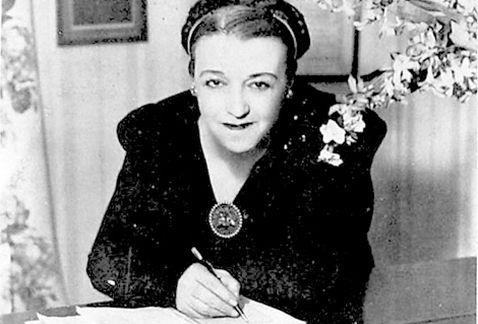
Mexican composer María Grever wrote the original Spanish versions of "What a Diff'rence a Day Made" and "Magic Is the Moonlight"

.

Russell had two more hits that same year: "What a Diff'rence a Day Made", original title "Cuando vuelva a tu lado" (When I Return to You), music and Spanish lyric by Mexican composer María Grever with English lyric by American lyricist Stanley Adams and backed by the Paul Weston Orchestra. It entered the charts on October 21, 1944, peaked at #14, and stayed on the charts for 8 weeks.

His other hit was "I Dream of You", composed by Edna Osser with lyrics by Marjorie Goetschius, and accompanied by the Paul Weston Orchestra. It entered the charts on December 30, 1944, peaked at #5, and stayed on the charts for 5 weeks. It was b/w "Magic Is the Moonlight", another composition by Maria Grever [whose original Spanish title was "Te Quiero, Dijiste (Muñequita Linda)"], with English lyric by Charles Pasquale, backed by the Paul Weston Orchestra, and featured in the MGM musical film Bathing Beauty.

Previously, Grever had felt the appeal of her compositions were limited due to their musical complexity with lyrics written in Spanish. She thus sought out Russell, a popular vocalist, during his personal appearances at the Paramount Theater in New York, hoping to convince him to sing her music in English, since she considered him to be the top crooner of the period. Their successful collaboration and Russell's dynamic interpretations led to her works finally achieving the personal, commercial and international recognition that had eluded her, to some extent, in the United States and in her native Mexico.

Russell's 4 top-ten hits on the Billboard chart in 1944 sold millions of records, and opened the door later in the decade for touring around the country and appearances on radio programs, motion pictures, and television. By late 1944, he was declared by the Mutual Broadcasting System to be the "idol of the crew-cut and bobby-sox set, and one of the nation's top-ranking romantic balladeers".

In 1946, his next big hit was "I Can't Begin to Tell You" which reached #7, and was from the film The Dolly Sisters. The next big hit came later in 1946: a two-sided hit with "Laughing on the Outside" which reached #4, and "They Say It's Wonderful" which reached #10, (from the Broadway show Annie Get Your Gun). His next hit, "Pretending" which reached #10 was backed with "Who Do You Love?" His final chart-toppers of the 1940s were in 1947: "Anniversary Song" which reached #4, and "I'll Close My Eyes" which reached #15.

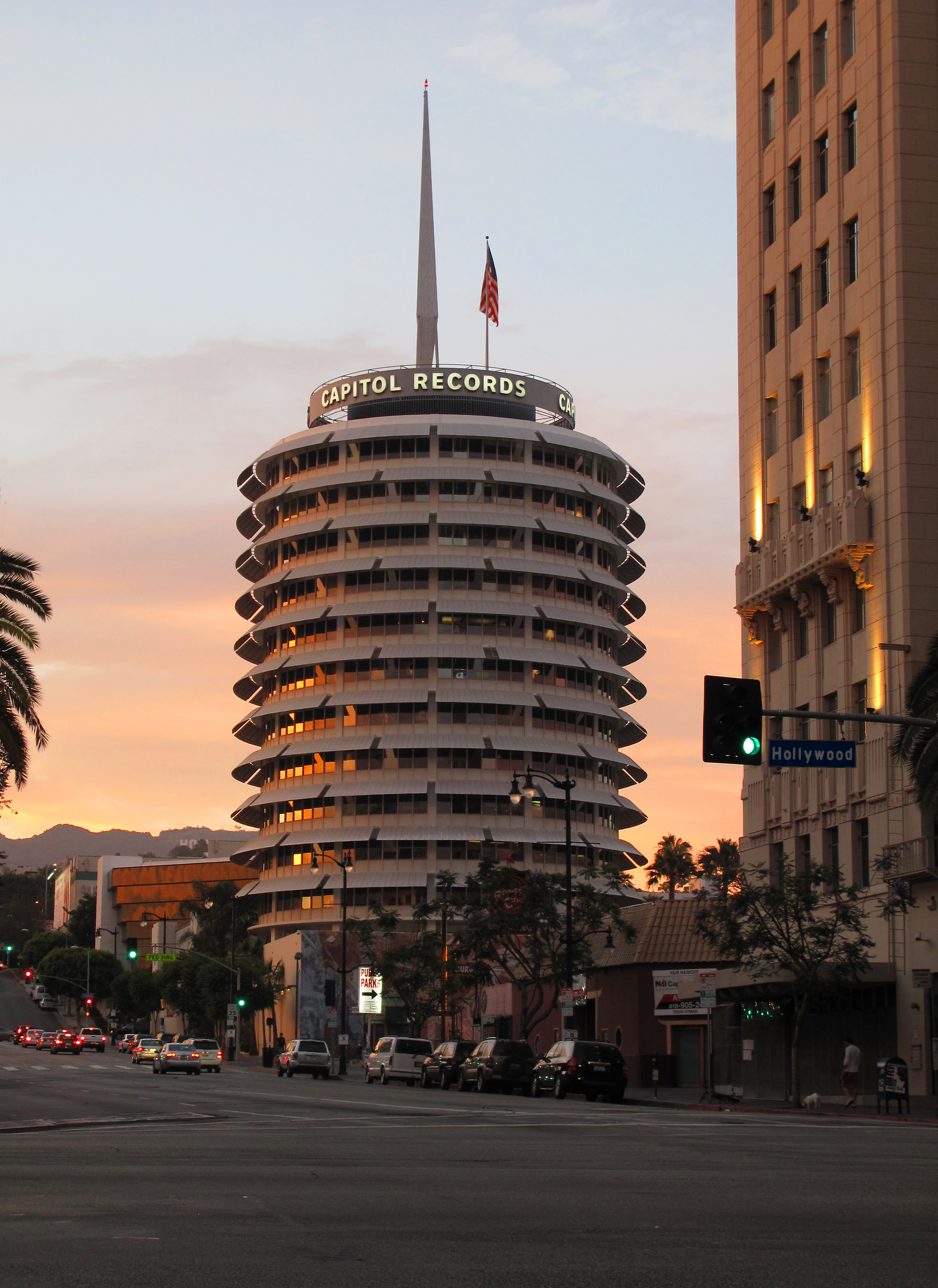
The sales of Russell's records enabled Capitol to build the "Stack o' Records" Building.

Russell had twelve records break into the charts between April 1944 and September 1948, eight of them in the top ten. He was not only an established star of the Big Band era, but recognized as a unique contributor with his bilingual singing style that opened up the international market for Capitol.

Music-store owner, Glenn E. Wallichs, a pioneer in the record industry for his attention to foreign markets, and co-founder of Capitol Records, made sure that Russell's records were distributed throughout Latin America, which meant huge sales for Capitol and ever-growing popularity for Russell south of the border. The success of Russell, along with the stable of Capitol recording artists, permitted Capitol to construct the famous thirteen-story "Stack o' Records" Building in 1954. The following year, Capitol was sold for $8.5 million.

=== Golden Age of radio ===
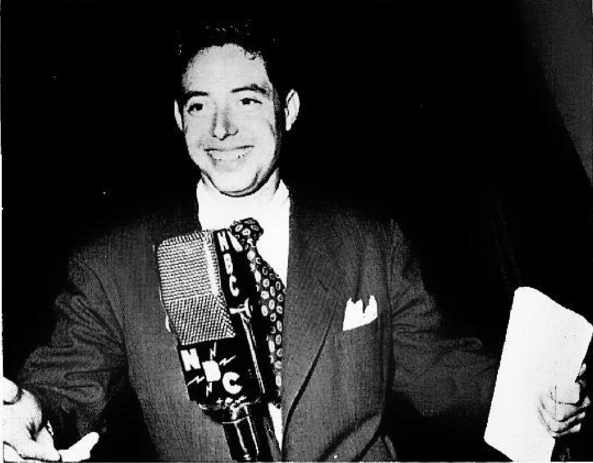
The Andy Russell Show on NBC radio in 1944.

By 1944, he had become a well enough regarded pop vocalist to be invited to perform on radio programs.

On November 9, he debuted on his own radio show on the "Blue" network, or NBC, called The Andy Russell Show, which broadcast out of Hollywood, California. He was the host and featured vocalist. In addition, he would invite guests to appear on his program, such as Dinah Shore and Johnny Mercer.

On Sunday nights over CBS radio, Russell was also a featured vocalist on the Old Gold Show, which was the name of the cigarette company that sponsored the program.

Russell sings "Amor" on this audio clip from The Jackie Gleason – Les Treymane Show in 1944.

Next up was an invitation to appear as a vocalist on The Jackie Gleason – Les Tremayne Show on NBC radio. Unlike his eponymous show which was broadcast from Los Angeles, California, it was necessary for Russell to take the train out to the East Coast, as this show originated from New York. It was reported that during the trip, he got sick because he had never been on a train before.

Also, in addition to duties as a vocalist, Russell played straight man to Jackie Gleason, the legendary comic and performer who would later be the star of the classic television program The Honeymooners. He would do this later in a motion picture with Groucho Marx, too.

With regard to his participation on the show, the Billboard 1944 Music Year Book stated that "the talented, handsome ... young singer's commercial appeal [was] tremendous. Starting with one song, audience response demanded his current three singing spots."

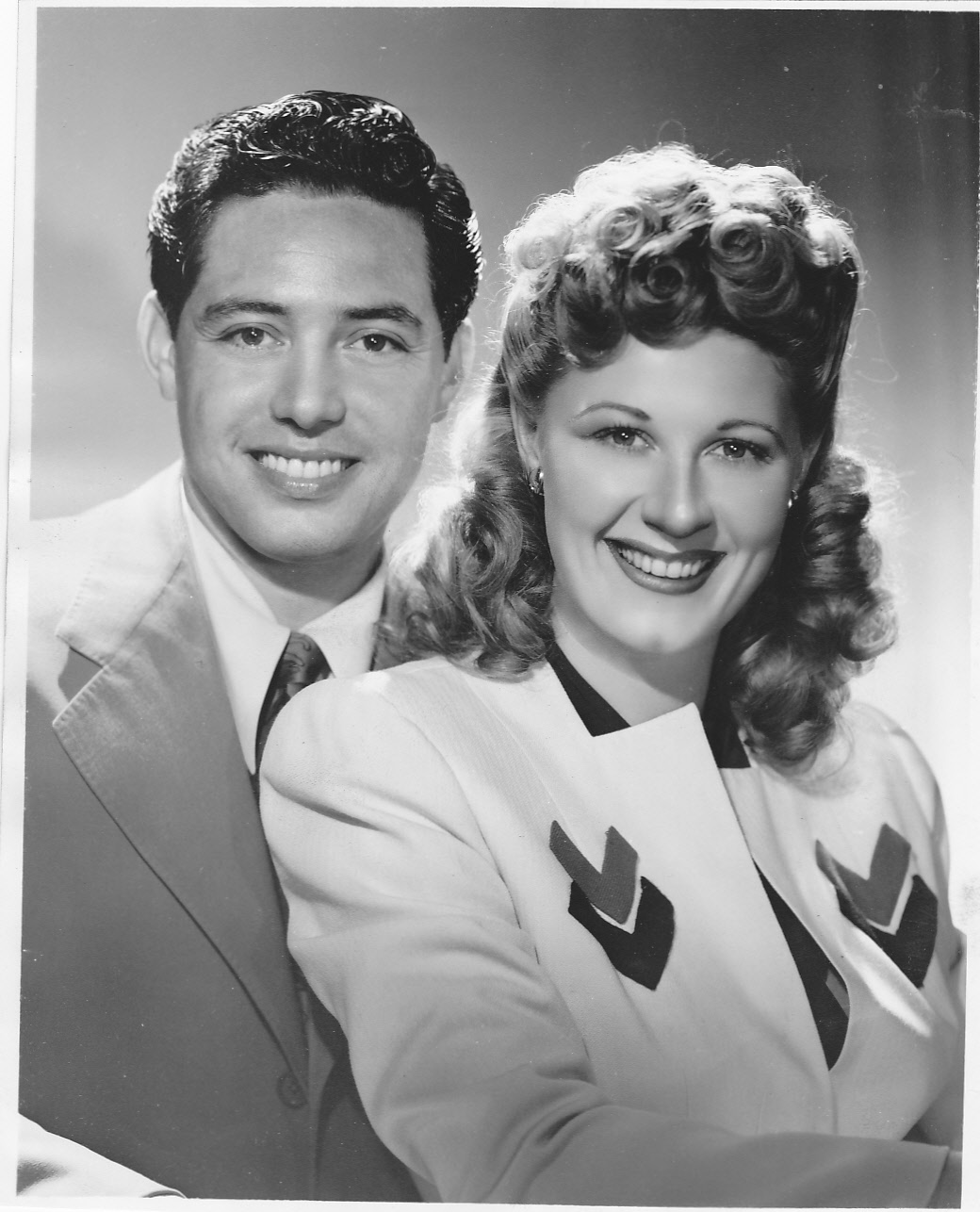
Russell and comedian Joan Davis (1945).

Later, from September 3, 1945, to May 27, 1946, Russell appeared on the CBS radio comedy show, The Joan Davis Show, which originated out of New York City. This program aired on Monday nights from 8:30 – 8:55 p.m. "Popular crooner Andy Russell served as both the variety anchor for The Joan Davis Show as well as Joanie's love interest in the situation comedy series ... [He] delivered as expected to the swoons and cheers of his millions of female fans of the era." In addition to singing, Russell also acted and played straight man to comedian Joan Davis. Paul Weston and his Orchestra provided the music.

Andy Russell Promotional Radio Spot (1945)

Finally, and most notably, starting on April 26, 1946, Russell began to appear as featured vocalist on the pop music radio program Your Hit Parade. This popular program aired on Saturdays, 9:00–9:30 pm on NBC radio and was broadcast out of New York City. He replaced Lawrence Tibbett, an opera singer, who had previously replaced Frank Sinatra.

After five months in New York, he was so popular that Lucky Strike cigarettes, the sponsor of the show, agreed to pay for the show to be broadcast out of its Los Angeles studios in order to appease Russell who was homesick. The shows from Hollywood began on September 21, 1946. He stayed on the program for 2 seasons, which led to huge popularity for the singer.

During this time Russell had two records in the Top Ten, while performing as a vocalist on Your Hit Parade. As the original vocalist, he would actually be able to sing his own songs on the program. His screaming, teenaged fans called themselves the "Russell Sprouts", of which there were 300 fan clubs throughout the United States.

=== Personal appearances ===
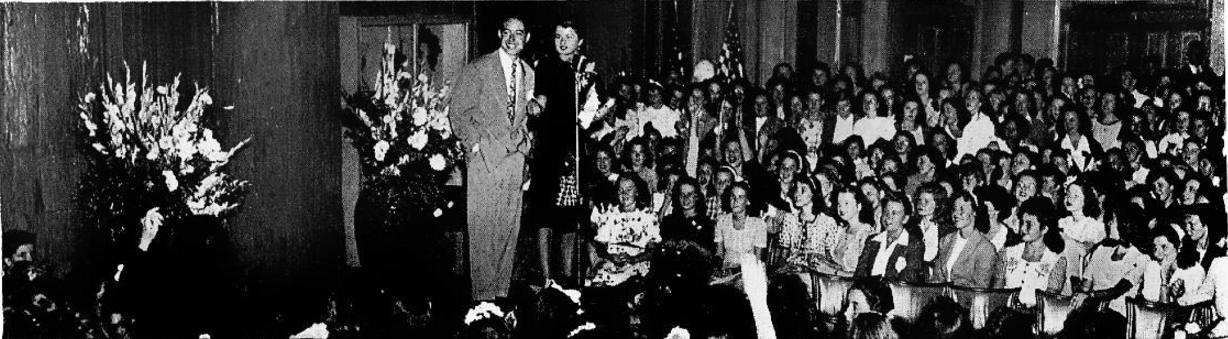
Personal appearance, 1944.

As he became more popular, Russell began making personal appearances in different venues in the country. His first personal appearance was on June 28, 1945, at the RKO Boston Theater in Newark, New Jersey, (Frank Sinatra's home town). Later, he made an appearance at the Paramount theater in New York, where he signed on to perform for two weeks, and wound up staying for five weeks. A review of Russell's performance stated: "His way of sliding into a husky chorus in Spanish – after going through the English version – has all the slick chicks swooning like crazy." Russell hoped to perform in Mexico, although he had never been there, despite being of Mexican heritage.

=== Hollywood ===
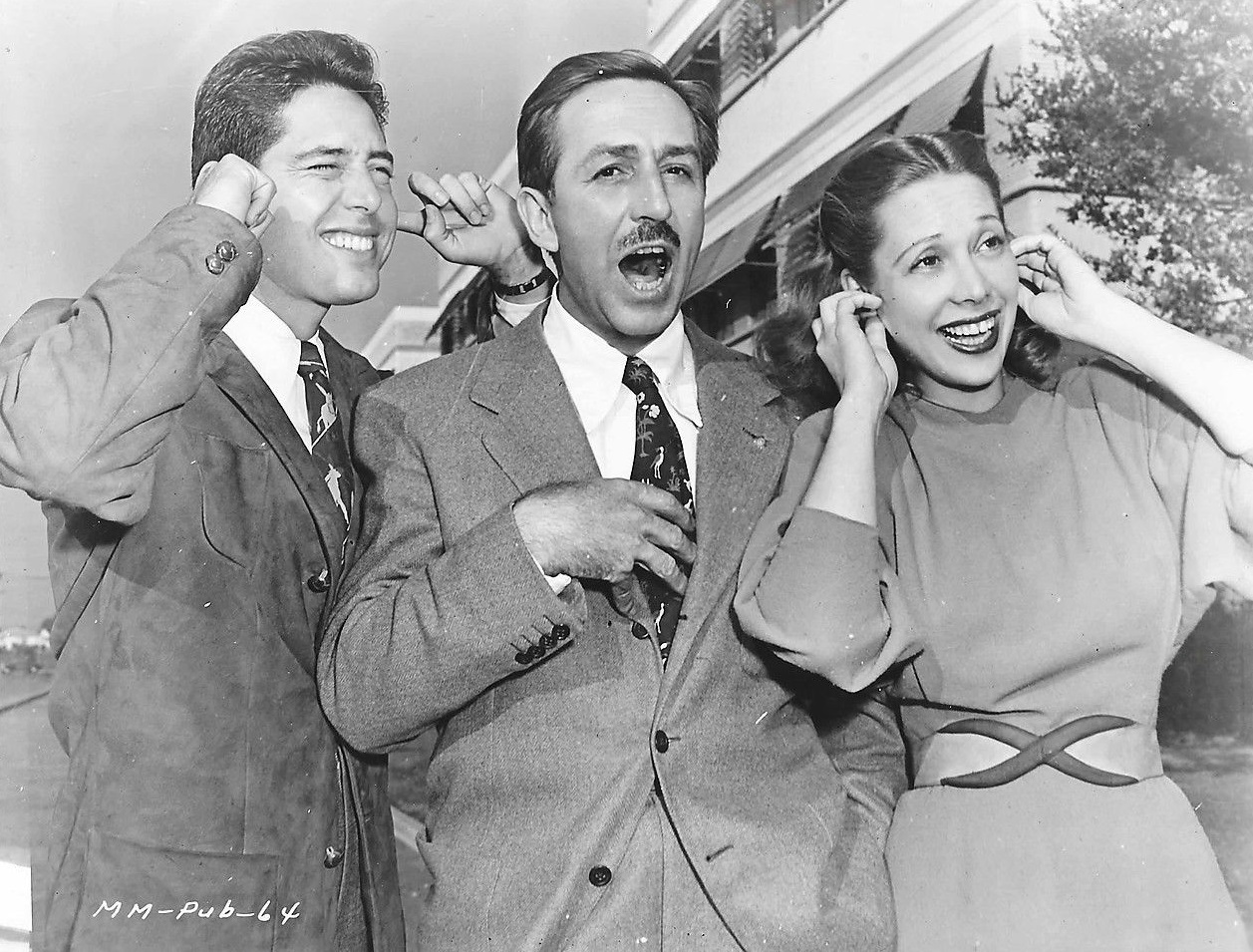
Publicity photo for Make Mine Music (1946) with Russell, Walt Disney and Dinah Shore.

Russell was then invited to Hollywood by Buddy DeSylva, co-founder of Capitol Records, to screen-test for motion pictures. He was contracted to appear in the film The Stork Club (1945). His movie career had an inauspicious start at Paramount Studios. The Mexican-American crooner was told by a security guard that it was a closed set and that he would have to leave. He waited outside the stage door, sitting in the sun until Hal Walker, the director, came looking for him and told him to get to work. Russell asked nervously, "Are you sure it's all right now?" In his motion picture debut, he played himself in everything but name, as he [was] cast as a dance band singer and swing drummer. He sang "If I had a Dozen Hearts" in a duet with Betty Hutton and a solo on "Love Me". He also displayed his percussionist skills on a drum solo of "China Boy".

In 1946, he appeared in the film Breakfast In Hollywood, where he sang "If I Had a Wishing Ring" in English and bilingual renditions of "Magic Is the Moonlight" / "Te quiero dijiste (Muñequita linda)" and "Amor".

In the same year, he sang "Without You" (based on Cuban composer Osvaldo Farrés' song "Tres Palabras") on the soundtrack of the Walt Disney animated feature Make Mine Music, the pop music version of Fantasia. The "A Ballad in Blue" section illustrated the end of a relationship using raindrops, flower petals, and a love letter.

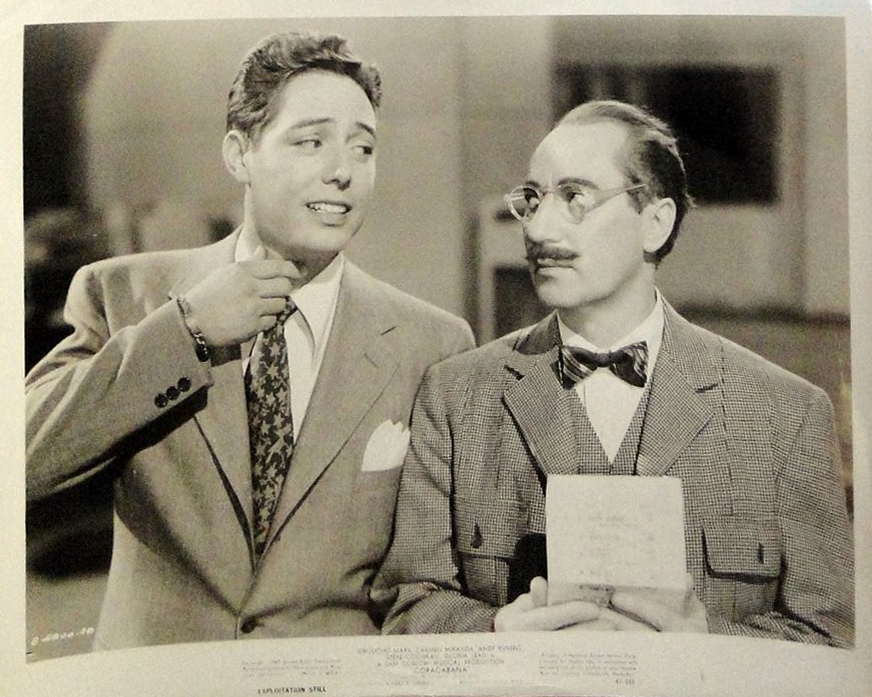
Russell and Groucho Marx in Copacabana (1947).

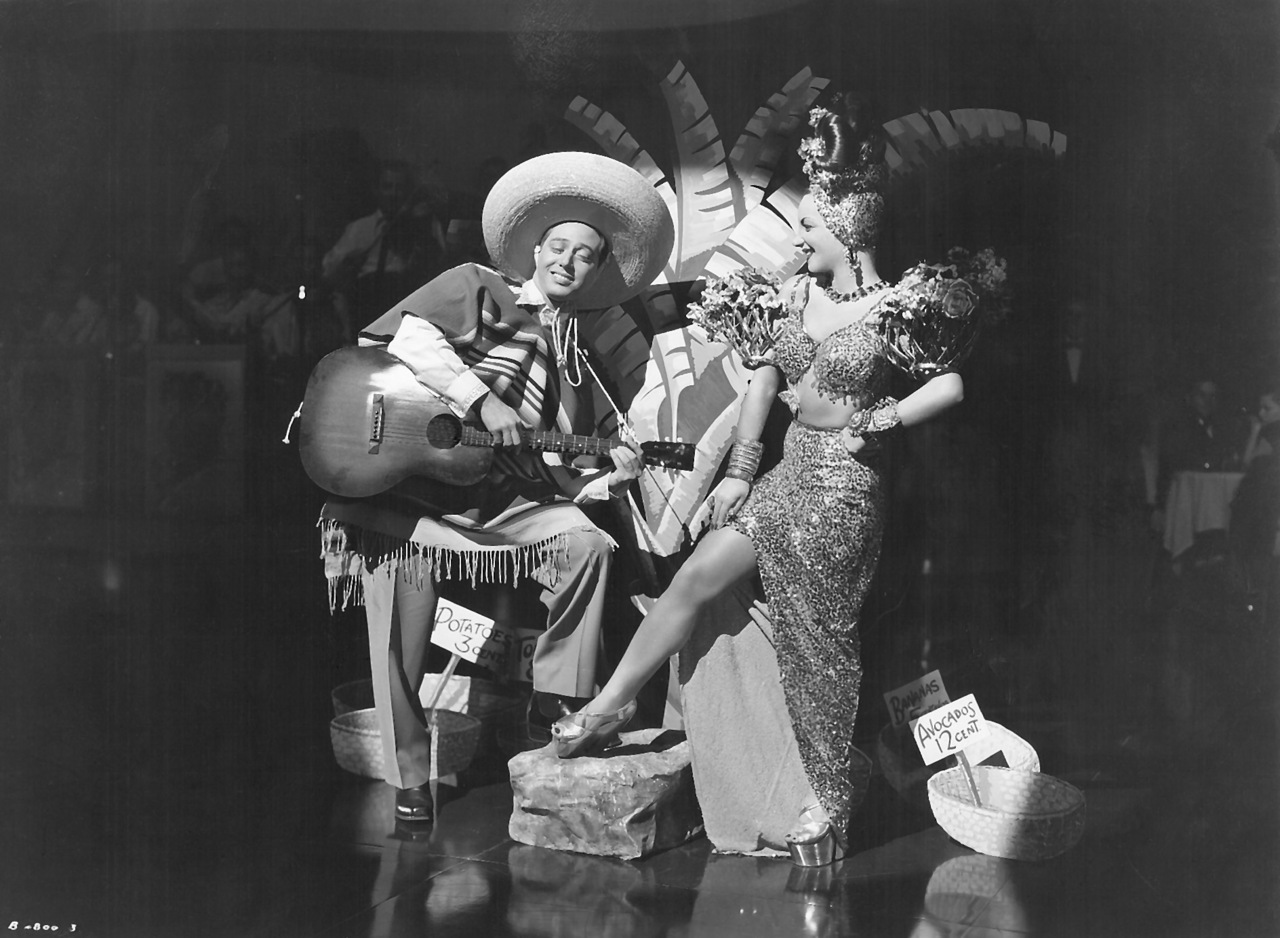
Russell and Carmen Miranda in Copacabana (1947)

In 1947, at the peak of his popularity, he appeared in the film Copacabana with Groucho Marx and Carmen Miranda. In this film, Russell good-naturedly plays his dumb-bell nightclub singer role with a mild manner, wide-eyes, and a toothy smile. About his performance, co-star, Gloria Jean said, "[He] was very bland, wishy-washy, but he had a lovely voice."

On March 13, 1947, he was a performer in the 19th Academy Awards at the Shrine Auditorium in Los Angeles, California, as he sang "You Keep Coming Back Like a Song" from the musical film Blue Skies, one of the songs nominated for the Oscar that year.

=== Television ===
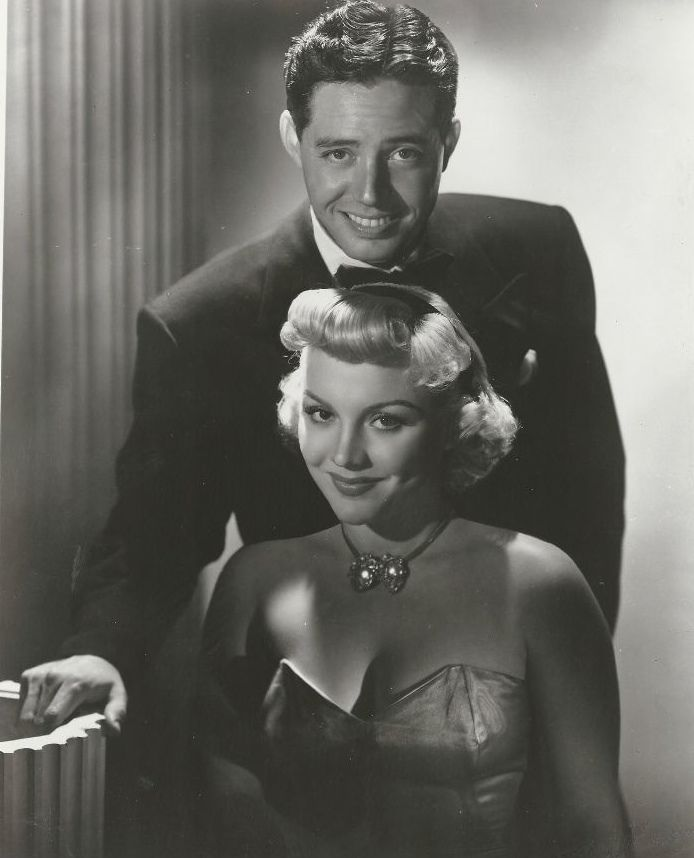
Andy and Della Russell

Later, Russell began to appear in the new medium of television in the early 1950s on Your Show of Shows with Sid Caesar on NBC but continued to record, though less frequently. From December 1950 to June 1951, he appeared with his wife on the ABC-TV show Andy and Della Russell. "It was a brief but pleasant musical interlude, which originated live from New York [from 7:00 to 7:05] every weeknight." They also had an act that they would perform together in nightclubs. A review described their act as: "delightfully light, cleverly done and wholly entertaining." In addition to singing and dancing, Russell performed impressions of celebrities. Lastly, they appeared together in the musical short, House Party (1953).

=== End of big band era ===
By 1952, Russell's hits had stopped coming, as the big band era had come to a close. Capitol Records lost interest in him as a hit-making pop star and began to look on with negative feeling.

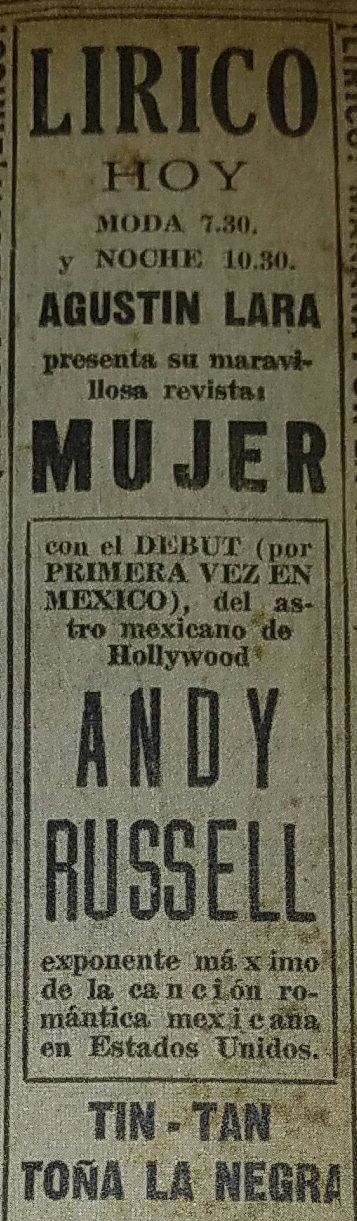
Playbill for Teatro Lírico, Mexico City, 1953.

At this point, Russell began to look elsewhere for a place to perform. On 16 October 1953, he made his debut in Mexico City at the Teatro Lírico alongside such legendary performers as Agustín Lara, Tin Tan, Toña la Negra, and others. He was billed as "the Mexican star of Hollywood and the greatest exponent of romantic Mexican song in the United States".

Then, in November 1953, after returning from his trip to Mexico City, he announced to his wife Della that he no longer loved her, wanted a divorce, and that he would move to Mexico City. The couple was separated for a month, at which point Della initiated divorce proceedings. Russell did not contest.

After that, his private life became fodder for the gossip columns as he experienced a public backlash and negative publicity due to the news of the couple's pending divorce. Many were angry and upset at this turn of events, as the Russells had been viewed as the "perfect Hollywood couple". They received hate-mail from irate fans, and Russell was pressured by the Hollywood community and Roman Catholic Church clergy not to proceed with the divorce because it would cause "a public scandal."

== Mexico, Latin America, Spain and Cuba ==
=== Mexico ===
After the divorce was finalized in February 1954, Russell was left virtually penniless, despondent, and out-of-work. His friend Charlie Skipsey, wealthy liquor distributor and later co-owner of the popular Mexican restaurant chains, Carlos'n Charlie's and Señor Frog's, advised Russell to go to Mexico.

In order to avoid the pressure of his situation in the United States, Russell reluctantly agreed to move to Mexico on a temporary basis, but he was hesitant because he could not speak more than a few words of Spanish, and he thought the people would not like him. However, when he arrived in Mexico, he was astounded to find thousands of people greeting him at the airport.

Skipsey put him up in the swanky and historic Hotel Regis (in Spanish) in Mexico City, where he found a confidante in actress Ariadne Welter, Skipsey's ex-wife and younger sister of actress Linda Christian.

In due time, Russell met Carcho Peralta, the owner of the hotel, and he talked to him about his unfortunate situation. In response, Peralta offered him the opportunity to sing at the hotel's nightclub, the Capri Room, backed by the orchestra of legendary composer, Agustín Lara. Russell accepted. His show had a great response from the audience, and he began touring other night club venues in Mexico with similar success.

His fortunes took a turn for the better when his friend Carlos Lopez Rangel, a newspaper editor and host of several radio programs, decided to interview him and tell his story to the public over the course of several programs, like a soap opera. The radio show had a tremendous impact and achieved such high ratings that it produced an outpouring of good will and sympathy for Russell from the Mexican public. "The people opened their hearts for me," he said, "They treat[ed] me like a brother."

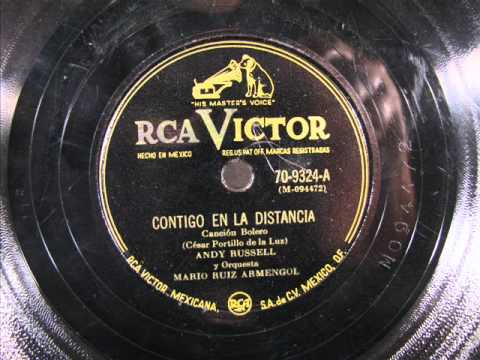
Russell's "Contigo en la distancia", RCA Victor Records, Mexico, 1954.

Russell realized at this point that he was popular in Mexico, so he made Mexico City his home base, while he performed for his fans. The idea of being a Mexican singer was intriguing to him.

In short order, he was offered a recording contract with RCA Victor Records of Mexico. His subsequent recording of "Contigo en la distancia" ("I'm With You Though You're Gone") by Cuban composer César Portillo de la Luz and backed by Mario Ruiz Armengol and his Orchestra was an unparalleled success and was number one on the music charts for eight months. His interpretation propelled this song to international fame and was so novel and overpoweringly romantic that it was viewed as influencing the birth rate in Mexico. His version of this classic Cuban composition is considered one of the best.

Furthermore, he signed a deal to do seven motion pictures and began appearing on the top television programs The Colgate Comedy Hour and the Mexican Kraft Music Hall. And as long as he remained a resident of Mexico for at least 10 months out of the year, he paid a very small income tax.

Russell recalled this phase of his life:

All of a sudden, my life – a complete turnabout from English to Spanish. I got into Mexico, got into the theater; we broke the records at the theater. I did my television show; it became the number one show; the number one radio show. I made a movie; it became the number one movie. Everything happened ... Before you know it, I'm making movies and I became a Mexican idol, all over Latin America and Argentina, Venezuela, every place. I was the number one box office in all these countries in Spanish. So I have the two lives, in English and in Spanish.

— Source, Loza, Steven. 1993.Barrio Rhythm: Mexican American Music in Los Angeles, University of Illinois Press., p. 148

Yet, one thing that he found embarrassing was the fact that his Spanish did not match the fluency of a native speaker because, according to him, it was "east-side." Moreover, by his own admission, he was "the gringo" who had a horrible American accent when he spoke Spanish. Thus, in order to prepare for his film roles, he gathered with his friends, who helped him with his pronunciation and to speak properly.

Although he was born of Mexican parents, he worked hard to overcome the "handicap" of having grown up in the United States in order to be accepted as an "hermano" in Mexico and be "one of the family" in Latin America.

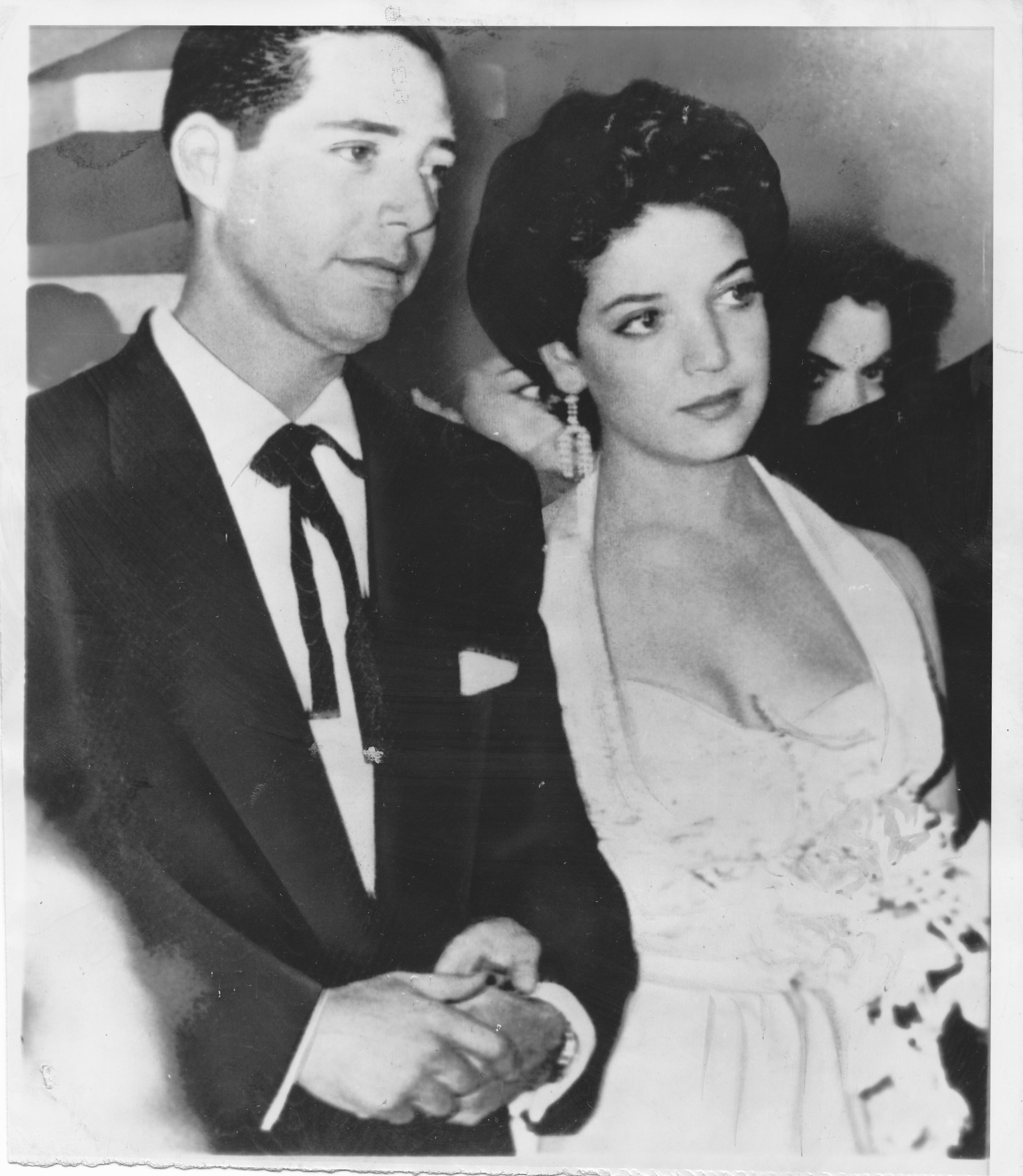
Russell and bride Velia Sánchez Belmont marry in Mexico in 1954.

Soon, not only was he fully recovered from the woes which had forced him to leave the United States, but he had actually discovered his roots in Mexico. Heartened by his success, he decided to remain there. On July 10, 1954, he married Velia Sánchez Belmont, the daughter of Mexico's former ambassador to the Netherlands. The civil ceremony took place at the bride's parents' home, and the reception and banquet was held at the Paolo, the ballroom at the Hotel Regis. Shortly thereafter, in September 1955, his wife gave birth to their son, Andy Roberto Russell Sánchez.

During this period, he was a Latin-American star of films, television, radio, and nightclubs. He not only made personal appearances in Mexico, but he traveled abroad to perform in other countries, including Canada and the United States. By November 1956, he was earning $7,000 a week (a far cry from the $2,500 a year he earned in 1940, beating the skins as a drummer in a hotel orchestra). All this good fortune led Russell to exclaim that "Mexico has been wonderful to [me]" and "has made me happier than I ever was in my life."

==== Mexican films ====
Russell wound up making five films in Mexico. These movies were of the light-hearted, comedic, and musical-variety kind, where he had a fair amount of dialogue and singing duties to perform. Since they were being marketed not just for Mexico and Latino communities in the United States, but for all of Latin America and Spain, Russell was paired up with a diverse cast of Latin American movie stars, along with established and popular Mexican actors like Evangelina Elizondo, who appeared with him in three of his motion pictures. In these Mexican productions, Russell's roles were spoken in Spanish and peppered with some English phrases; in contrast, the roles in his American movies were spoken only in English; however, he sang bilingually in both. Russell had to learn "enough Spanish to star in film in Mexico and in Spain. His first director cast him as a Mexican reared in the United States (the case, again, of Russell playing himself), but after that his accent was convincing and he became entirely bilingual."

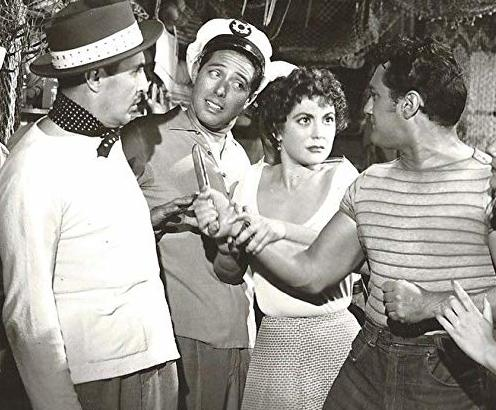
From left to right: Jorge Reyes, Russell, María Antonieta Pons and Joaquín Cordero in ¡Que bravas son las costeñas! (1955)

His film debut in Mexico was ¡Que bravas son las costeñas! (Coastal women are so temperamental!) (1955), directed by Roberto Rodríguez and co-starring Cuban actress María Antonieta Pons and Mexican actors Joaquín Cordero and Evangelina Elizondo. Filming began on 16 August 1954 in Churubusco Studios in Mexico City and on location in Acapulco. It premiered on 2 June 1955 at Cinema Olympia, where it played for 3 weeks. Around this time, Russell and Elizondo made a live appearance at the historic Million Dollar Theater to promote the film for the United States Latino public in Los Angeles, California.

In his commentary, Mexican film historian Emilio García Riera begins his film review by introducing Russell:

Andy Russell (Andrés Rábago), Chicano of Los Angeles, who made a modest career as a crooner and appeared in 4 films in Hollywood, entered the national cinema transformed into an extravagant type of 'pocho' playboy, complete with a pipe and captain's hat, owner of a yacht, with a particularly obnoxious American accent and a languid way of intoning songs, a-la-Bing Crosby. His character declares, of course, much love for Mexico, but he only manages to disrupt the typical tropical setting, where the women defend their honor against the attraction caused by their own sensuality ... Russell's character is not a threat to these heroines; one could say he only wishes to flirt with them in the style of a Hollywood B-grade musical-comedy. However, the response to frighten the 'pocho' from defiling the honor of a woman is wholly disproportionate, and he is dismissed with dishonor.

The following year in 1956, Russell starred in three movies, the first being Mi canción eres tú (You Are My Song), directed again by Roberto Rodríguez and co-starring Mexican actress and singer Evangelina Elizondo. Filming began on April 1, 1955, in the Churubusco Studios, and the premiere was March 28, 1956, at Cinema Orfeón, where it played for two weeks.

García Riera starts off his film review by noting that previously he, like many others, viewed Russell as the epitome of conceitedness and extremely stuck-up. In this Hermanos Rodríguez production, Russell represented a threat of hybridization. His character, called "Danny" more often than "Daniel", at 15-years-old beat it out of Mexico to go to the United States, and he returned with bilingual crooning abilities. His family members called him "bracero" (farm laborer), so as to not call him "pocho", He has future possibilities of entering the "gringo" middle-class due to his success on television, singing in high-priced cabarets, and the sale of records ...

¡Viva la juventud! (Hurrah for the Young People!), a musical-comedy directed by Fernando Cortés, was his most popular film. Filming began on 31 October 1955 in the Tepeyac Studios, and the premiere was on 15 May 1956 at Cinema Orfeón, where it played for 8 weeks.

According to García Riera, this film was a watershed in that its new formula of combining diverse genres, current events, several performing artists, and different styles of music and dance numbers was a hit with audiences and would influence how Mexican films were produced later in the decade of the 1960s. García Riera noted that the "gringo", middle- and upper-class element in the film, for example, the student body dancing cha-cha-chá and wearing sweaters with big letters with the Ciudad Universitaria (the campus of the National Autonomous University of Mexico) as a backdrop, was reinforced by "the 'pocho' singer Andy Russell, who covered his jalopy with expressions, such as 'Mercedes ven,' in the manner of American college-boys, and heard Michigan instead of Michoacán." He also felt that the film's plot was poorly written, pointed in too many directions, and that it contained too many comedic and musical numbers.

Primavera en el corazón (Springtime in the Heart) was his last collaboration with director Roberto Rodríguez co-starring Italian actress Irasema Dilián and Spanish actor Enrique Rambal. Filming on this musical-comedy began on 23 June 1955 in the Churubusco Studios, and the premiere was on 20 September 1956 at Cinema Alameda, where it played for 2 weeks.

This film was noteworthy for being the first Mexican film in color (Eastmancolor) and in Cinemascope, done in the classic Hollywood style.

His fifth and last Mexican film was Vístete, Cristina (Get dressed, Cristina), a musical-comedy directed by Miguel Morayta with Mexican actress Rosita Arenas. Filming began on 5 May 1958 in Azteca studios, and the premiere was held on 23 April 1959 at the Cinema Olimpia, where it played for two weeks.

In his film review, García Riera labels Russell's character "el pocho Carlos." The character's actual name is "Carlos Lata". García Riera sarcastically wonders why Russell's character would be given such a last name as "Lata". In Spanish and in this context, "lata" means to "pester, bug, or be a pain, a nuissance." He also refers to Russell as the "Hollywood crooner with the smoky voice ... who sings 'Amor'" and sums up his review in one sentence: "The movie is an illogical mess and very inconsistent, but not obnoxious, a quality which the 'pocho' Russell was famous for having."

==== Criticism ====
In Mexico, Russell was criticized for modifying the lyrics, tempo and/or melody of traditional Latin American standards, for example, his jazzy, up-tempo renditions of "Perfidia" and "Cuando vuelva a tu lado" of the mid-1950s. He had already felt somewhat constrained when performing before Mexican audiences, as they often did not appreciate the changes or updates he would make to traditional songs. In general, Mexicans, and Latin Americans, preferred that Russell sing in Spanish and respect the traditional forms of music. If he were performing before a Mexican audience, he could not use special material because they might mock him by saying, "He's getting fancy."

It seemed that "the gimmick (singing bilingually) that brought him fame in his native country was unwanted south of the U.S. border. He felt negative responses from audiences when he sang in English.

Yet, despite the resistance and conservative leanings of his Latin-American audiences, Russell could observe that by the early to mid-1960s, Mexican musicians and the public were opening up and becoming receptive to combining musical styles as he himself had already done in the 1940s and 1950s. He addressed this issue in a 1967 interview with Billboard magazine:

You can turn the radio on today in Mexico and hear American music played by Mexican boys and it's rock. Mexico is changing. Before, everything was Mexican music. Now there are other influences being heard ... Years ago, it was a crime for a performer to change the authentic musical forms. A bolero was a bolero. I drew a lot of criticism for jazzing up 'Perfidia'. Today, the young musicians are making rock versions of standards.

— Source:, Billboard. December 16, 1967. p. M-24

Thus, although Russell received some criticism for his bilingual ballads and mixing of American and Latin American musical rhythms, he can also be considered to have been a musical pioneer in Mexico, due to the fact that his versatility influenced the next generation of Mexican rockers to be receptive to and combine musical genres.

=== Argentina ===
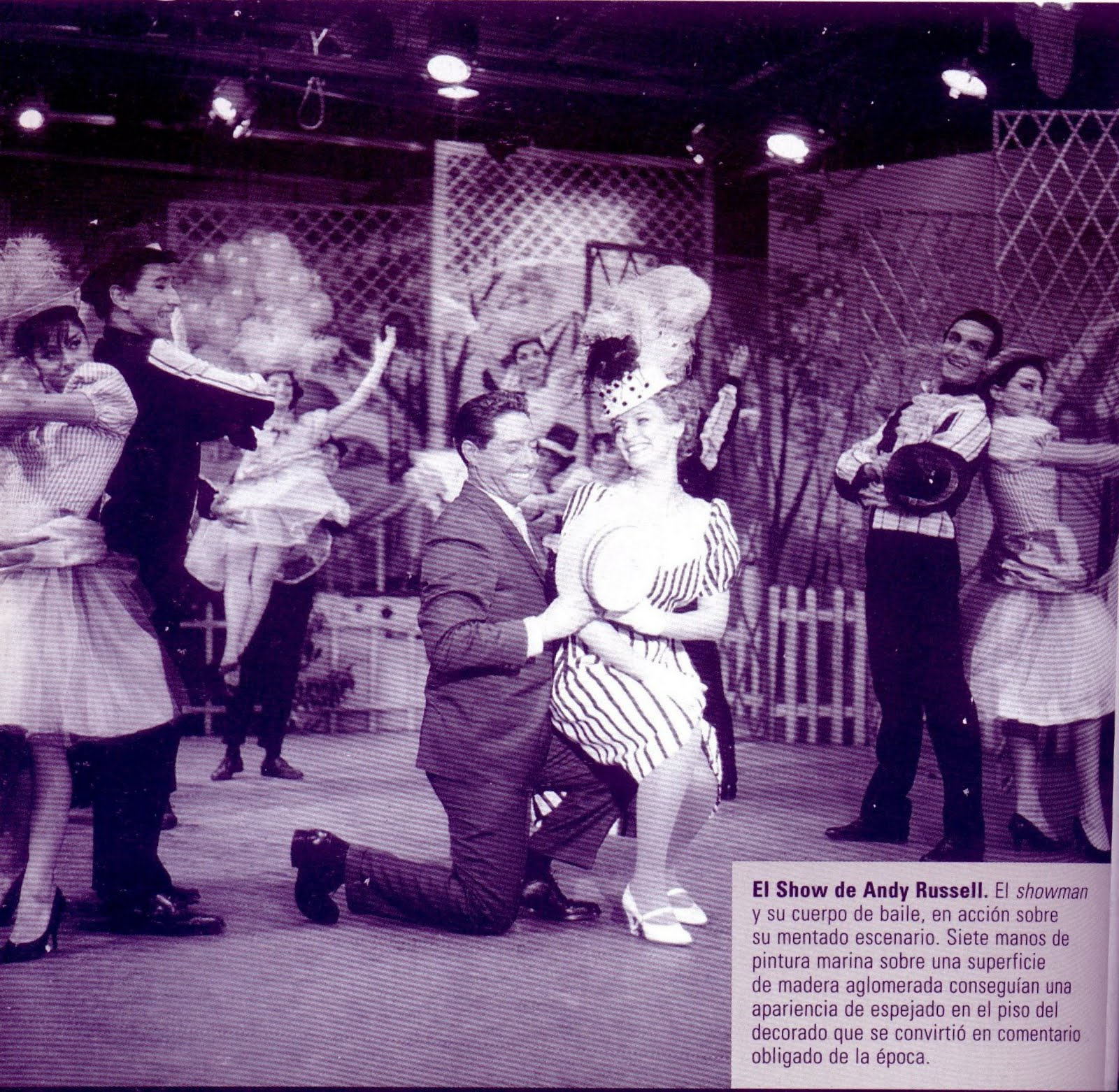
Publicity photo for El show de Andy Russell.

From 1956 to 1965, Russell traveled back-and-forth from Mexico City to Buenos Aires, Argentina, where he had a television variety show called El Show de Andy Russell on channel 7. The show was produced and broadcast during the summer months over the course of 13 weeks.

In 1958, the name of the show was changed to El Show de IKA (sometimes billed as Desfile de Éxitos IKA) when Argentina's largest automaker, Industrias Kaiser Argentina (IKA) became the sponsor in a bid to sell more automobiles. Soft-drink manufacturer Pepsi Cola would also become a sponsor. At a cost of more than 3,000,000 pesos, it was the most expensive television show produced in that country, and the first to use cameras mounted high above the stage to capture exceptional visual effects.

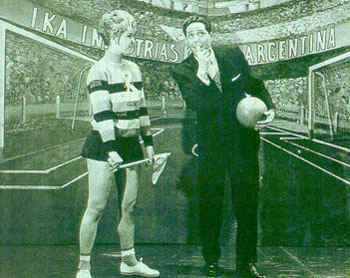
Nélida Lobato on El show de Andy Russell.

The unprecedented scale of the show became apparent as a Jeep was driven onto the stage during every performance, along with the ballet troupe of Eber and Nélida Lobato, a 50-piece orchestra conducted by Angel "Pocho" Gatti, and the Fanny Day choir, all in support of Russell.

In compensation for his hosting and singing duties, Russell, for his part, received an unspecified, but princely sum. Russell was described as being "a professional who was conscientious and diligent, and very American ... The show was a smash hit. We would rehearse every day. He was tireless."

=== Other Latin American countries ===
He toured through "every country in Latin America," and his acceptance and popularity was such that "Andy Russell" became a household name in Latin America. He felt so welcomed that he stated: "When I am in Argentina, I am Argentine. When I am in Nicaragua, I am Nicaraguan."

Russell appeared on Latin American television in Caracas, Venezuela on the show Renny Presenta with Renny Ottolina (1964), where they sang "Manhattan" in English and exchanged pleasantries in Spanish before a live television audience.

=== Spain ===
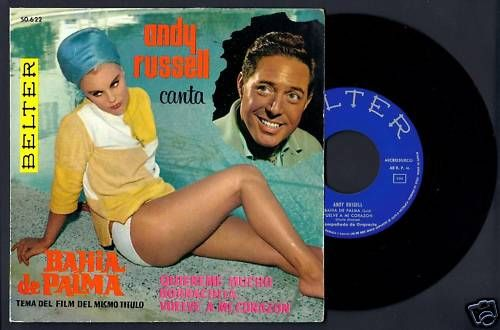
Russell sang the theme song from the Spanish film Bahia de Palma on Belter Records 1962.

In 1962, Russell was signed to a recording contract by Belter Records of Spain. The deal was that he would record the songs in Orfeon of Mexico, and the discs would be manufactured and released in Spain. He recorded several albums, which were primarily ballads and up-tempo jazz numbers backed up by a full orchestra band conducted by Chico O'Farrell. He also recorded the two title songs for the soundtracks of popular Spanish movies of the time: Bahía de Palma (1962) and Sol de Verano (1963). The former featured sex symbol Elke Sommer wearing a bikini, the first time a woman was shown wearing a bikini in a Spanish movie. Lastly, in 1966, he sang "Soñarás" ("You Shall Dream") on the soundtrack of the Spanish animated movie El mago de los sueños (The Dream Wizard).

Russell performed frequently in Spain, and even sang for Spanish dictator Francisco Franco several times, who honored him with awards.

=== Cuba ===
Russell worked Cuba every six months, making personal appearances at the Dune Television and the Havana Hilton, occasionally alongside Tony Curbelo. He was present when Fidel Castro overthrew the government of Fulgencio Batista. Since he believed Castro was about to bring freedom to the Cubans, he celebrated with everyone in the streets. But he looked back with regret, as he said: "A country that had the greatest music in the history of Latin music from Cuba, you know? Now they're just closed in completely."

== Return to the United States ==
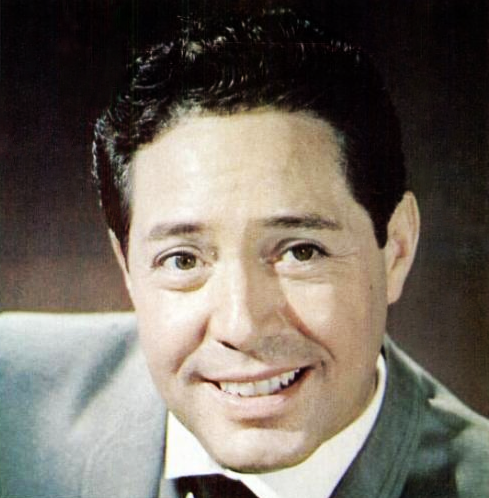
Russell in 1966.

After being based in Mexico City for the past 11 years and performing in Latin America, Russell "felt that he was losing his professional identity and also being subtly pressured into becoming a citizen of Mexico." Moreover, he believed that "you haven't got the freedom in Mexico that you've got here [in the US]. You wouldn't dare say anything against the government of Mexico, or you're found in an alley the next day, or you're thrown out of the country. You haven't got that freedom. In this country you can do everything you want; in fact, a little too much [laughs], you know?"

He returned to the United States in 1966 and to Capitol Records. His comeback album in the United States was "More Amor!" (1967), a collection of English and bilingual English/Spanish songs, most notably the singles "Longin'" and "Enamorado" ("In Love"). Capitol dubbed a version of "Longin'" in Spanish for release to its Latin American affiliates, while it produced a promotional music video for "Enamorado." No song from this album entered the Billboard charts. His comeback show took place at the Sahara Hotel and Casino in Las Vegas, Nevada, to rave reviews.

Later in the same year of 1967, Capitol released his follow-up album called "... Such a Pretty World Today", and it produced a #1 single called "It's Such a Pretty World Today" that stayed on top of Billboard's Easy Listening Chart for nine weeks. His next single from the same album "I'm Still Not Through Missing You" also cracked the Top Ten. He also made some LP's for the Argentine market that were well received.

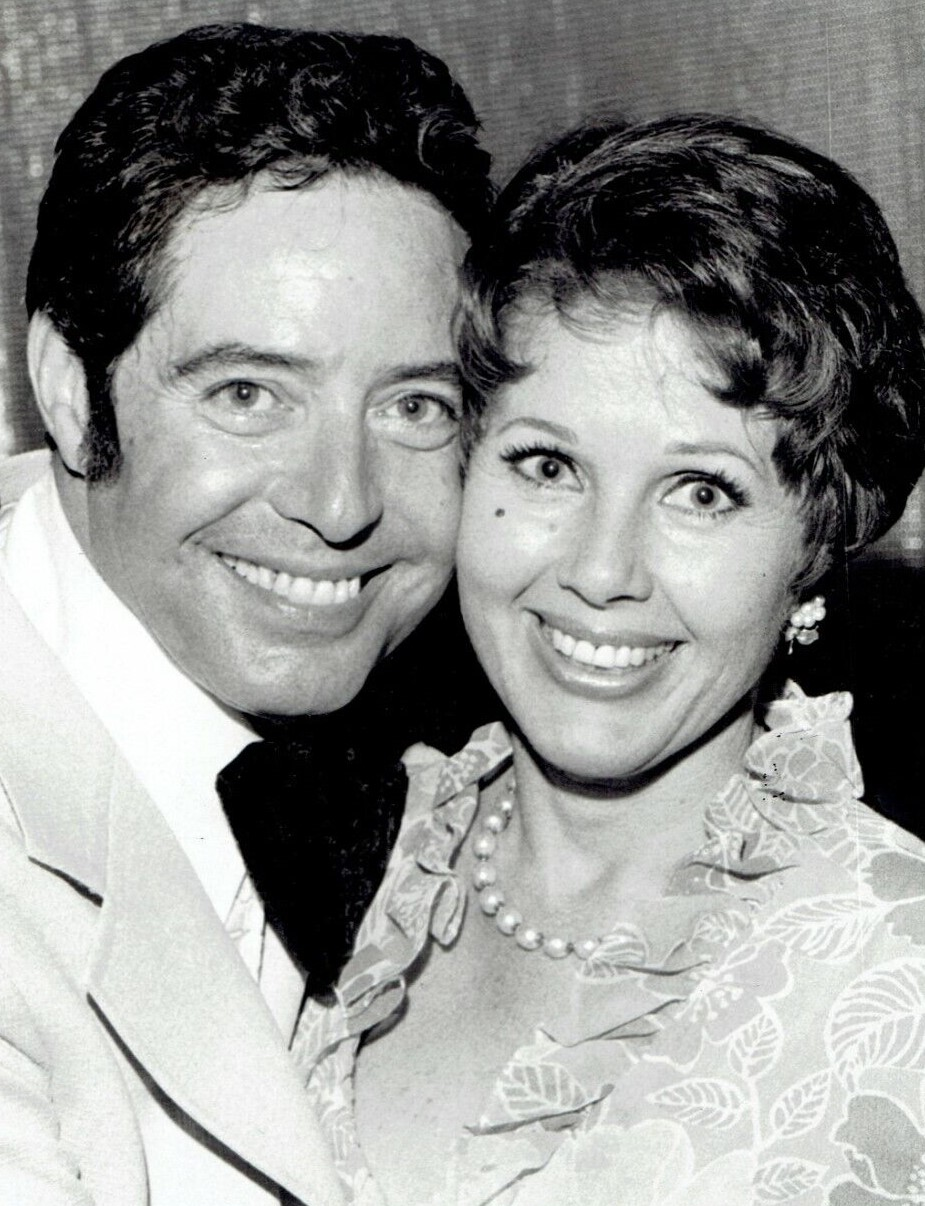
Russell and Ginny Pace in 1974.

That year, he married his fourth wife, Ginny Pace, a talk show hostess and former Mrs. Houston.

On the CAP Latino label, Russell joined Eddie Cano, another Mexican-American native of East Los Angeles, and Trío Los Copacabana (made up of Oscar F. Meza, Mike Gutierrez, and Rick Chimelis) for the all-Spanish "Quiereme Mucho", an album of trio music. Cano was the arranger and conductor. They sang such Mexican standards as "La Mentira", "Nosotros" and "Sabor a Mi".

In the decade of the 1970s, he worked consistently, making appearances at home and abroad. From 1970 to 1971, he had personal appearances in Scottsdale, Arizona; Rio de Janeiro and São Paulo in Brazil; Buenos Aires, Argentina; Mexico; and Venezuela.

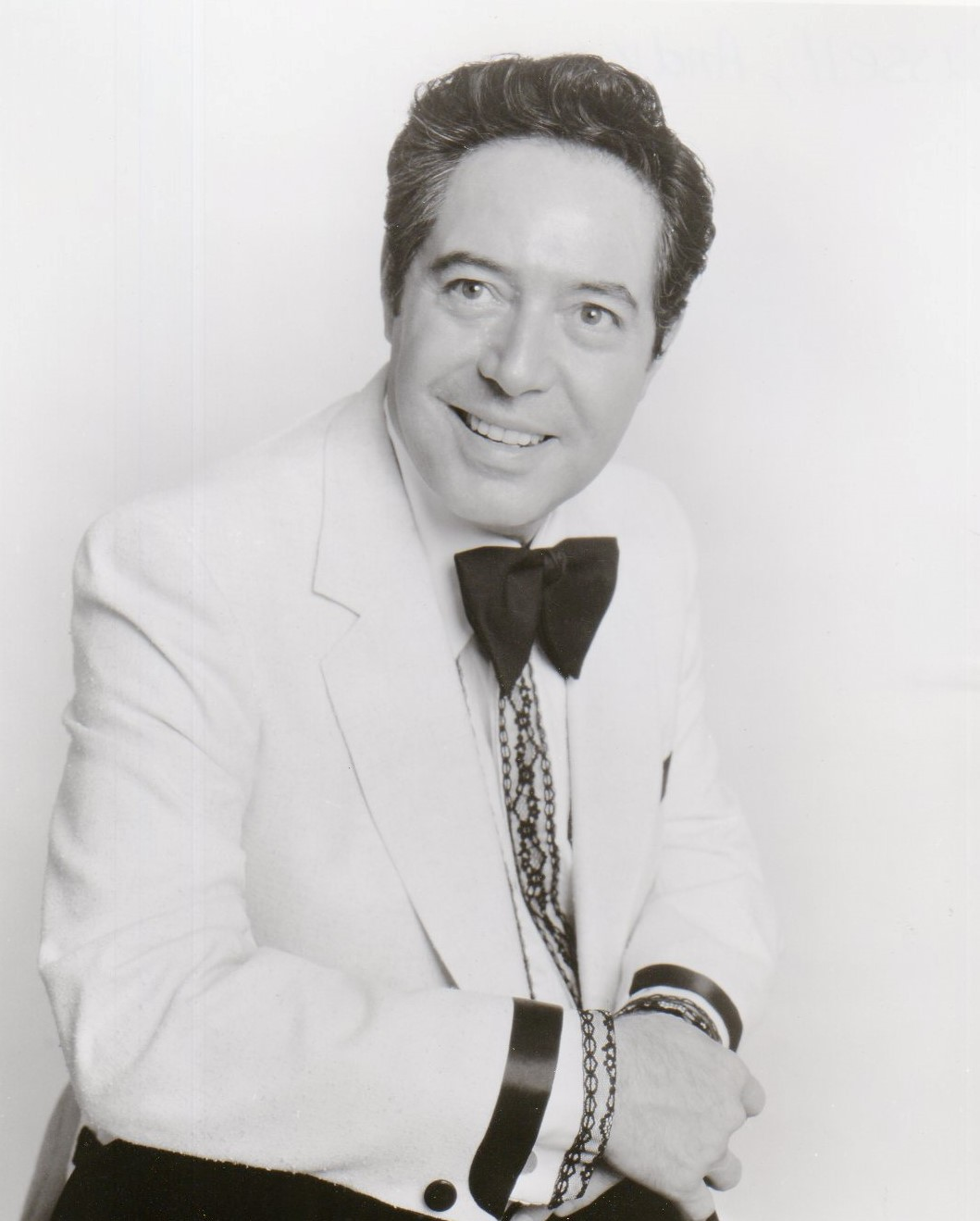
Russell in the 1980s.

In 1973, he recorded the "International/Internacional" LP for the Discos Latin International label, which included his Spanish cover version of Albert Hammond's "It Never Rains in Southern California", "Nunca llueve en el Sur de California". In addition to the United States, this album was sold in South America and Europe. In Spain, the album received a rave review, and Russell was described as "The Latino Sinatra" and his singing style as "timeless, universal, and as valid today as when he began." Lastly, during this period, he appeared on various television programs, such as "The Tonight Show with Johnny Carson", "The Today Show" and "The Merv Griffin Show".

During the 1980s, he continued to record and perform. He signed with Kim Records and released the LP "Yesterday, Now, and Forever" (1982). He was a frequent guest on television programs. In 1983, he could be seen on "Family Feud" with Richard Dawson. He performed on big band television specials for PBS to raise funds for public television. He was interviewed on Spanish radio programs and heard on radio commercials in the Los Angeles area.

Russell continued to appear and perform around the world, in major American clubs, Las Vegas, Lake Tahoe, the Chateau Madrid in New York, the View o' the World supper club at Disney World in Orlando, Florida, Disneyland, the Hollywood Palladium, La Fiesta Supper Club in Juarez, Mexico, the Garden Bar of the Miyako Hotel in San Francisco's Japan Center, and in concerts before nostalgic swing audiences.

== Personal life ==
=== Charities ===
Although Russell was 4-F (unfit for military service) due to a broken arm that did not heal properly, he helped to raise funds for the war by singing at fund raisers.

Russell came up with the idea for the different vocalists and big band musicians to form teams and play annual softball games for the Youth Welfare Fund, a charity. The Hollywood Chamber of Commerce organized the games for such teams as the "Andy Russell Sprouts" and the "Frank Sinatra Swooners" to play at Gilmore Stadium (which was demolished in 1952, when the land was used to build CBS Television City in the Fairfax District of Los Angeles, California). Other stars who participated were crooners Dick Haymes, Nat King Cole, and Mel Tormé; bandleader Harry James; dancer and actor Gene Kelly; and comedians Bob Hope and Mickey Rooney. Actress Jane Russell and Lois Andrews also participated as "Russell Sprouts" bat girls, while Virginia Mayo was a "Frank Sinatra Swooners" bat girl.

=== Friendships ===
Russell sang in a quartet with Bing Crosby, Dick Haymes, and Jack Benny on the last's radio show.

Della and he were close, long-time friends of tenor Mario Lanza and his family. The couples vacationed together at a ranch near Lake Mead, Nevada. In 1950, Russell and his wife Della were asked to be godparents to Lanza's second daughter, Ellisa. Lanza subsequently developed an infatuation with Della, which inspired him to record his own romantic – and according to him, better – version of "Bésame Mucho" for her. By 1953, after supporting Lanza through his personal troubles, Russell became frustrated and their friendship declined.

=== Romances ===
Russell was romantically linked with different women in his life, such as actress Ariadna Skipsey (née Welter) (1954), the Countess Joaquina de Navas of Madrid (1964), Houston oil heiress Susan Smithford (1966), and Spanish dancer Maria Rosa Marcos (1967).

=== Marriages ===
Russell was married five times:

His first wife was Evelyn Marie Morse (1919–1993). Date of marriage was June 30, 1940, in Los Angeles, CA. Their divorce was finalized in 1945.

His second wife was Della Norrell (née Adelina Naccarelli) (1921–2006), a New York nightclub singer. They wed at the Little Church of the West, Las Vegas, Nevada, on October 23, 1945. "During the ceremony, Della was crying when the minister asked, 'Do you?' So, Russell just upped and said, 'Yes, she do.'" They would later marry in a Catholic church ceremony because Della felt that they were not really married. Afterwards, she became his singing partner, and they sang together on records, nightclubs, the ABC-TV show Andy and Della Russell (1950–1951), and the musical short House Party (1953). They were considered the ideal, Hollywood couple, and their fans and the public at large were shocked when they divorced on February 3, 1954.

His third wife was Velia Sánchez Belmont (1929–2002), the daughter of Eduardo Sánchez Torres, former Mexican ambassador to the Netherlands. They wed in Mexico City on July 10, 1954, and had a son, Andy Russell, Jr., the following year. They divorced in 1961.

His fourth wife was Virginia "Ginny" Pace Russell (1931-2019), a talk-show hostess and former Mrs. Houston. According to a 1962 newspaper article, Pace was married with five children. In 1967, she divorced her husband and married Russell that same year. Russell considered himself a "real family man" and was dedicated to his six children and grandchildren. The couple divorced in 1987.

His fifth wife, to whom he was married to the time of his death in 1992, was Doris E. Russell.

== Later years and death ==
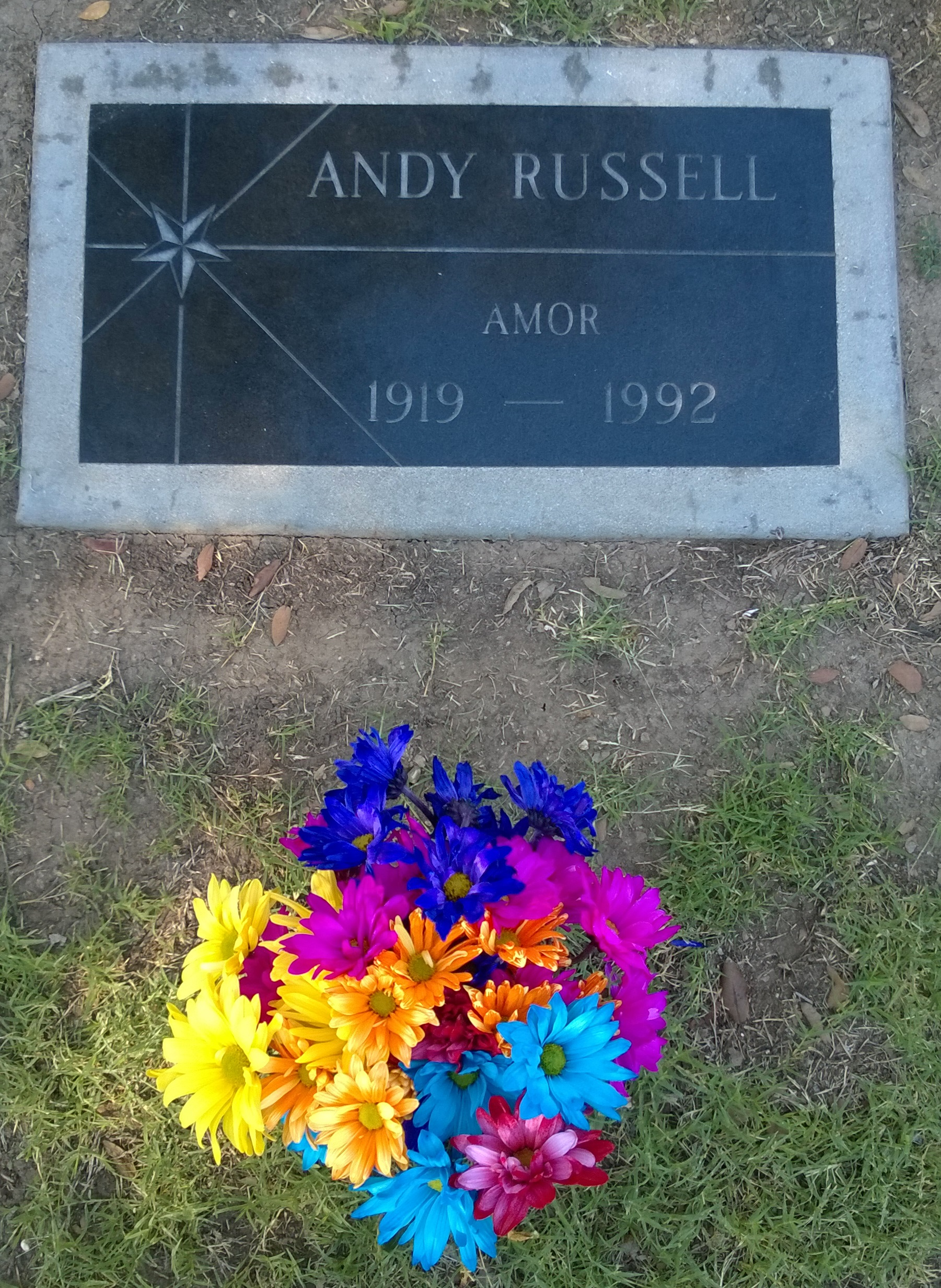
Russell's gravestone

In 1989, he retired to live in Sun City, Arizona, with his fifth wife, Dora.

In February 1992, he suffered a paralyzing stroke followed by another stroke on April 12, 1992. He died from complications at St. Joseph's Hospital in Sun City, Phoenix, Arizona, on April 16, 1992, at the age of 72. A public memorial service was held at St. Juliana's Catholic Church in Fullerton, California, on April 22, 1992. He was interred in Loma Vista Memorial Park in Fullerton, California. On his gravestone, there is inscribed the title of one of his hits, "Amor".

About love, Russell said: "I fall in love wherever I go. I think being in love [is] the most exciting thing there is."

His thoughts on enthusiasm were: "Enthusiasm is the greatest word in the world. It's seeing a scenic sunset and stopping to watch it. It's telling my wife she's beautiful. It's taking my sons to dinner and coming back to watch the football or baseball game on television. We're so blasé I can't stand it (he said of people in general). If I lose my enthusiasm, I'm dead. In fact, if I die before my wife, I've asked her to put a smile on my face before they bury me."

== Awards and legacy ==
=== Awards ===
- The Pioneer of Argentine Television
- The Showman of the Americas (Argentina)
- Citation by Pope Paul VI
- Barcelonés Honorario (Spain)
- Mayorquín Honorario (Spain)
- Golden Microphone (1966) – An award by Capitol Records for record sales.
- El Águila de América (The Eagle of the Americas) (1972 or 1974) – an honor awarded him by Mexican journalists, members of the Mexico Newspaper Writers Guild (APERM).
- One of the Most Popular Singers in the World (1975) – Proclamation approved by the Los Angeles City Council and signed by Arthur K. Snyder, Councilman of the 14th District (which includes Boyle Heights, where Russell was born).
- Award of Appreciation (1978) – for being the American who has done the most for Mexican music.
- Nosotros Golden Eagle Award (1979)

=== Legacy ===
Russell started a new way of singing that combined English and Spanish, plus Latin and American rhythms, that established him as being the original crossover artist. With his romantic, baritone voice; professional, polished demeanor; and energetic showmanship, he introduced American audiences to Latin-American musical compositions with Spanish lyrics, while influencing later Latino and non-Latino recording artists to be open to the idea of singing bilingually, due to his previous success with the concept. To further illustrate this point, Russell's repertoire also included songs in French "Je Vous Aime" and in German "Danke Schoen". From his peers in the music industry, he gained not only their professional respect, but their love and admiration, as well. Ultimately, he embodied North American, South American, and European musical styles and invited people from around the world to enjoy his unique and entertaining musical stylings. And it must be noted that Russell "with his interest in contemporary American music combined with his strong Mexican culture ... always considered himself a mixture of both Mexican and American heritages."

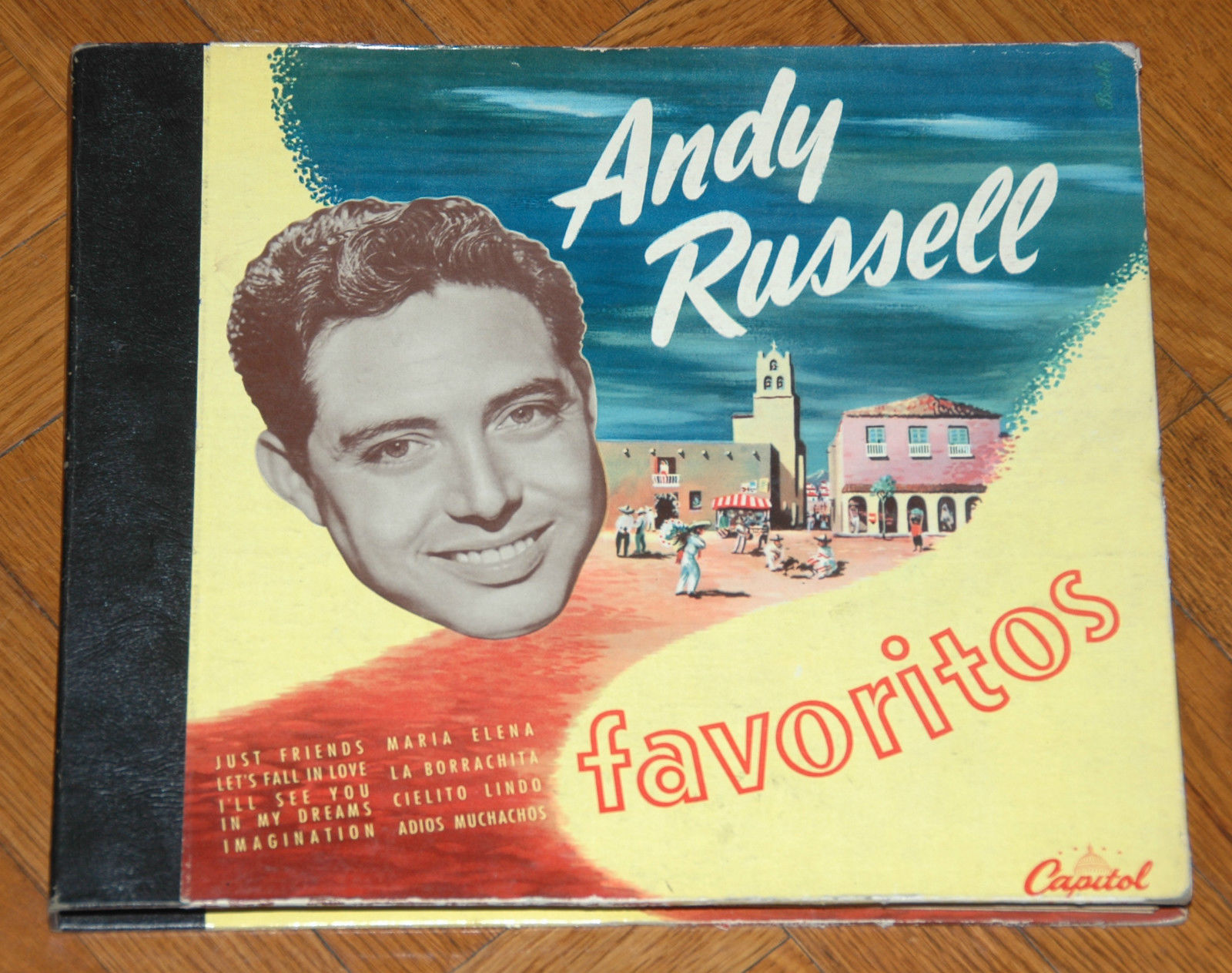
Andy Russell, Favoritos LP, Capitol Records, 1943

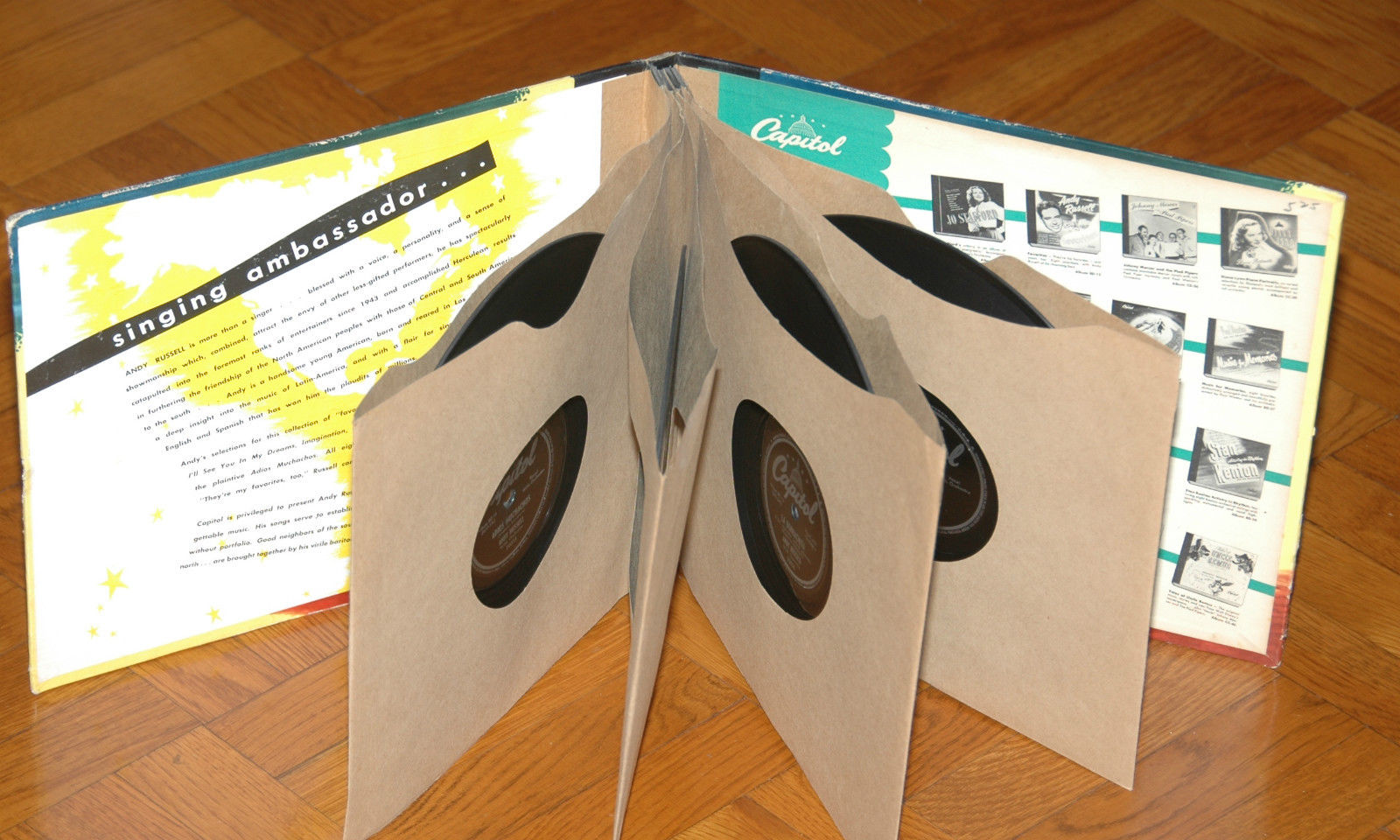
Andy Russell, Favoritos LP (inside), Capitol Records, 1943

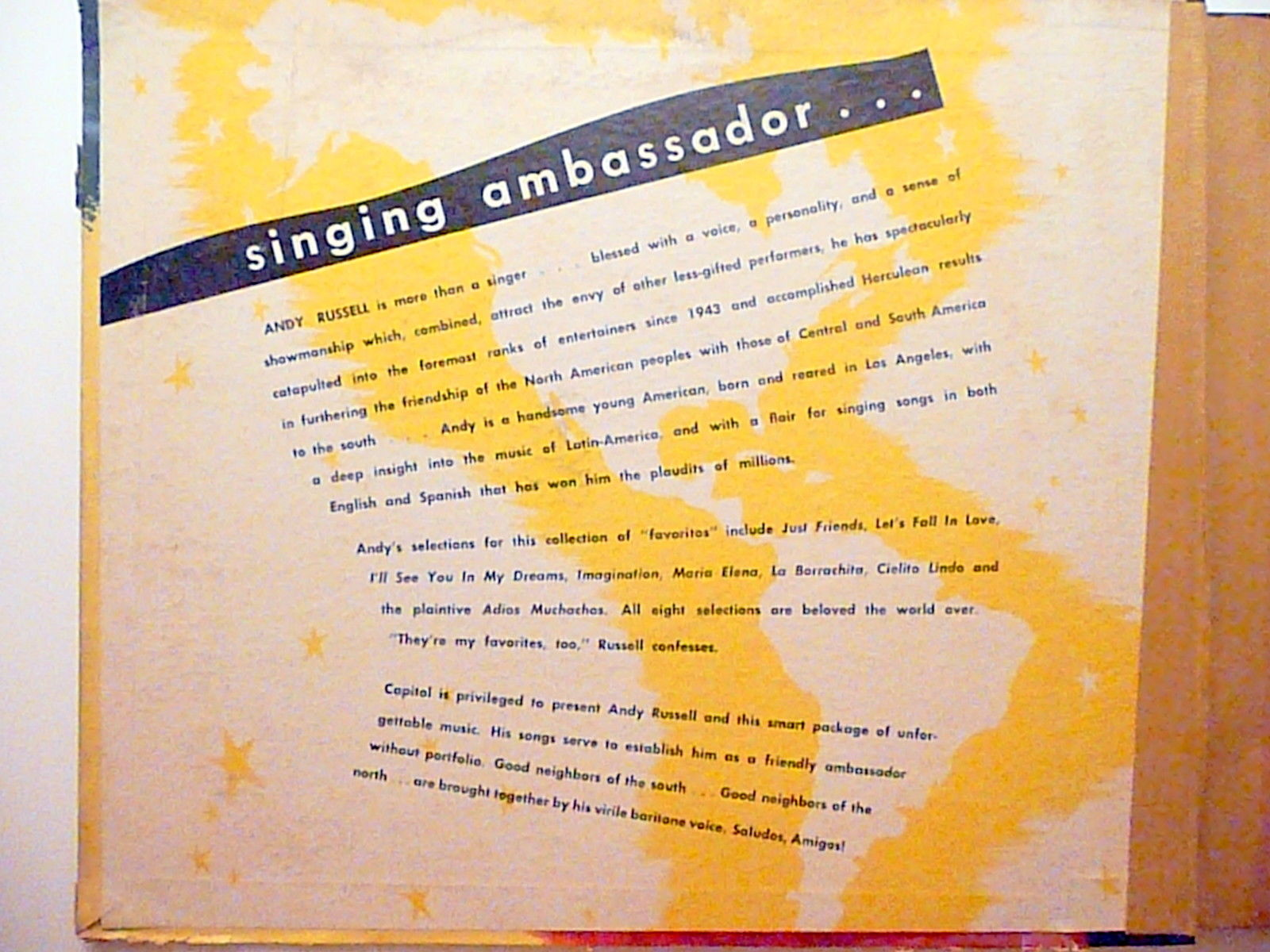
Andy Russell, Favoritos LP, (inside flap), Capitol Records, 1943

== In popular culture ==
Russell is mentioned in the Chicano seminal work The Autobiography of a Brown Buffalo (1972) by Oscar Zeta Acosta on p. 73:

"And unless we bathed and washed the dishes, we couldn't turn on the little brown radio to listen to The Whistler, The Shadow, or The Saturday Night Hit Parade with Andy Russell, the only Mexican I ever heard on the radio as a kid. We would sit and listen while we shined our shoes. During the commercials, my mother would sing beautiful Mexican songs, which I then thought were corny, while she dried the dishes. 'When you grow up, you'll like this music, too,' my ma always prophesied. In the summer of '67, as a buffalo on the run, I still thought Mexican music was corny."

In his short story Zona Rosa, 1965 (2004), Vicente Leñero envisions this fashionable neighborhood in Mexico City as a female energy "who is well versed in literature; she's chatted with Carlos Fuentes at Café Tirol; she's become a bullfighting buff after seeing Paco Camino leaving Hotel Presidente. She lives at Génova 20 to be neighbors with Emily Cranz and Andy Russell, or at the Londres Residential to be on first-name terms with Gloria Lasso.

A couple of his songs have been part of the soundtracks of motion pictures: "Soy un Extraño" ("I am a Stranger") in the 1990 Spanish movie Boom-Boom and "Amor" in the American movie Lolita (1997) directed by Adrian Lyne.

== Controversy about racial and ethnic identity ==
=== What's in a name? ===
In his book Rock the Nation: Latin/o Identities and the Latin Rock Diaspora (2010), Professor Roberto Avant-Mier points out on pp. 58–59 that Russell did not embrace his Mexican heritage and Spanish language as a youngster. He also indicates that at the urging of bandleader Gus Arnheim, Russell accepted to change his original name of "Andrés Rábago" to the anglicized "Andy Russell". He seems to imply, then, that Russell simply gave up his name and cultural identity in exchange for musical and economic opportunities otherwise reserved for Anglo-American musicians. Furthermore, Avant-Mier contends, Russell acquiesced because, from an early age, he seemed to be more comfortable with his American rather than Mexican culture.

However, Avant-Mier does not take into consideration (as explained earlier) the context of the place and period that Russell had been born and reared in the United States during the first half of the 20th century and its influence on one's self-identity. The country experienced two World Wars, a Great Depression, and a wave of nationalism and patriotism that fostered a common and united national identity, rather than ethnic pride. Yet, although Russell spoke and understood more English than Spanish, and was exposed more to American than Mexican culture during the initial stage of his career, however, in no way did this signify a rejection of his Mexican culture. It was solely a temporary accommodation, as Russell stated: "Part of the reason I changed my name – as did many Jewish entertainers – was that I did not want to be stereotyped [as just a Latin singer]. But now I'm hard to sell in my own country – except to those who already know me."

Yet Avant-Mier rejects Russell's nuanced argument by concluding that "Russell eventually attributed his phenomenal success to the fact that his light skin and European features allowed him to pass as Anglo- or European-American." (Avant-Mier, 59) To support his conclusion, Avant-Mier simply references all nine pages (142–150) of Loza's Barrio Rhythm: Mexican-American Music in Los Angeles without specifying exactly where Russell admits to "selling out", which Avant-Mier seems to imply.

Avant-Mier overlooks Russell's talent, drive, and work ethic as essential components to his success. Plus, no credit is given to Russell for having the flexibility to manage his identity in order to capitalize on the few opportunities available for a Mexican-American in a racist society, while being faithful to aspects of both his Mexican and American identities. While some may call this "selling out", others might view it as "when life gives you lemons, make lemonade",

Avant-Mier continues: "The case of Andy Russell also reminds us of social structures that often required Latino/as to perform whiteness in order to have any chance of success in the mainstream music business." (Avant-Mier, 59) Deborah Pacini Hernández states as much on p. 10 of her book Oye Como Va!: Hybridity and Identity in Latino Popular Music when she makes the same casual argument: "Latinos who could 'pass' as white could access the mainstream market, although only if they hid their ethnicity by changing their names, as did Andy Russell and Ritchie Valens, respectively born Andrés Rábago Pérez and Ricardo Valenzuela."

Thus, neither seem to lend credence to Russell's claim that his Mexican-American ethnicity was clearly evidenced by his singing in Spanish and his continual affirmation of being of Mexican descent. Specifically, once he had a huge hit with "Bésame Mucho", Russell's trademark was his bilingual singing ability, which would not only be a feature of many of his songs, but a reflection of his cultural upbringing. As Loza states: "Because he was singing bilingually, Andy felt that the public would know his background by the Spanish songs in his repertoire" and realize he was a Mexican who had simply adopted a stage name, as was the norm for many performers of all ethnicities in that era.

Russell has also stated that he was always upfront about his Mexican heritage: "You know, I would tell everybody, I'd say, 'I'm Mexican ... ' and they'd say, 'No, Andy, you must be Spanish.' I'd say, 'No, I'm Mexican ... ' and they'd say, 'No, Andy, but you're so light.' And I'd say, 'No, no, I'm Mexican. My father's Mexican. My mother's Mexican ... '" Clearly, his ethnic identity was not up for negotiation.

In truth, there was not much the talented, hard-working Russell could do about his personal appearance, who just happened to be "six feet tall, weighs 170 pounds, has hazel colored eyes, and black hair." Russell's distinct racial characteristics apparently were classified as being "Anglo", although they fall within the diversity of Mexican racial identity with its three main components being Spanish, Indian, and Negro ancestry (in varying degrees). In Russell's case, his preponderance of European stock was a reaffirmation, and an extension, of his Mexican identity. There was no need for him to "perform whiteness" or "pass as white", as it was already a part of his racial heritage and identity – but as a Mexican, not European-American.

Russell's nationality was American, but, at the same time, he never denied his Mexican ethnicity. The name change was simply a means to an end. The explanation could be as simple as Arnheim did not like the sound, wanted something easier to pronounce, and chose "Russell" because it reminded him of Russ Columbo (a vocalist and violin player associated with Arnheim and his Orchestra who had already gained popularity before his untimely death). "Russ Columbo" was a stage name, as his birth name was "Ruggiero Eugenio di Rodolpho Colombo".

Another adherent who claimed that Russell's success was due to his "whiteness" was Lalo Guerrero, Mexican-American composer, singer, and musician. He stated that he might have had mainstream success, if he, too, were "güero" (light-skinned), like Russell or Vikki Carr. In addition, according to Guerrero, they were the only Mexican-Americans who were accepted and successful in Mexico. This simple, almost naive explanation belies Guerrero's own stature as a legendary musician of some renown, known as the "Father of Chicano Music".

As stated previously, one must take note that there were also examples of other Mexican-Americans and Mexicans who were successful and who did not anglicize their names: actors Anthony Quinn, Ricardo Montalbán, Katy Jurado, Pedro Gonzalez Gonzalez, etc. Other dark-complexioned recording artists who were known during the period were Mexican singer Toña la Negra and Cuban singers Celia Cruz and Benny Moré and musician Pérez Prado. In addition, Germán Valdés, Tin Tan, a Mexican comic, actor, and singer who grew up in the border area of Ciudad Juárez, Chihuahua, south of El Paso, Texas, was exposed to Mexican-American pachucos and caló. He used this knowledge to create his comical version of a pachuco, using bilingual dialogue to hilarious effect and enormous popularity.

Guerrero understood the fact that, despite the shade of a Mexican's skin tone, starting and maintaining a career in the entertainment industry mainly took a lot of hard work, dedication, networking, and luck.

But, the assessment of Avant-Mier that Russell's success was mainly due to the fact that he "Anglicized" his name and used his "European" features to bypass American society racist structure and perform "whiteness" is short-sighted. In contrast, for Russell, the "name-change" was not that important in the big picture, since he would always claim, sometimes emphatically so, that he was ethnically Mexican. Some newspaper articles, books, and liner notes support this statement (see section What's in a Name? II).

As such, this whole construct needs to be reframed: Russell as a Mexican was involved in a give-and-take, push-and-pull dynamic where, at times, he was on the forefront singing bilingually and declaring his Mexican ethnicity; and, at other times, conforming to American society's stereotypical notions of Mexicans performers in order to have the opportunity to perform and earn a living.

Furthermore, to describe Russell as performing "whiteness" brings up images of performing "blackface" which would be a misnomer, as this term is applied within the context of the racial discrimination exhibited by Anglo-Americans against African-Americans, so it seems out of place when referring to Mexicans or Mexican-Americans who not only have a distinct racial, ethnic, and cultural heritage, but a different history in the United States, as well.

Moreover, Russell's ability to sing in Spanish would prove to be a double-edged sword: it gave him popularity and acceptance at the onset, but it also typecast him as a Latin singer, leaving him out of work when the popular wave of Latin music passed. But what bothered Russell the most was that his identity as an American singer could be called into question.

This same ability to sing in Spanish, however, then opened up a whole new market for him in Mexico, Latin America and Europe, where his brand of music was not only accepted but celebrated. Unfortunately, here, Russell was subject to the Mexican brand of discrimination which tended to label him a "pocho". (see "Mexican Films" section above)

One must question if Guerrero's assertion regarding skin color and success in the music industry (and validation of this by later Latino scholars) is correct and universal: that light-skin and European features allowed for upward mobility, while tan or dark-skinned performers were penalized. One cannot deny the preponderance of light-skinned musical stars, but the dark-complexioned stars were also present in United States (and Mexico).

Most important, the expression of Chicano artistic and musical creations were finding an outlet within and outside of the mainstream, for reasons that go beyond just skin color and discrimination. In Russell's case, he was described as having a remarkable voice, a flair for showmanship, along with charisma and good looks.

On a personal level, just like in the United States, his need to sing and perform were validated in Mexico and Latin America; moreover, he must have surely felt more ethnically Mexican than ever before, when in 1956, he married the daughter of a Mexican diplomat, who gave birth to his only son ...

But after 11 years of living and performing in Mexico and Latin America, Russell once again felt the blade of the double-edged sword when he said he "felt that he was losing his professional identity and also being subtly pressured into becoming a citizen of Mexico," which precipitated his return to the United States in the mid-1960s, and, again, having to resort to a temporary accommodation in terms of his Mexican-American identity. The pendulum now swung the other way, as he sang mainly in English and married a blue-eyed, blond former Mrs. Houston.

In conclusion, questions regarding Russell's identity, appearance, acceptance, success, and influence over a career spanning 50 years and several continents is much more complex and layered than what Avant-Mier, Pacini Hernandez, and Guerrero have presented.

=== What's in a name? II ===
Russell had been emphatic about his Mexican ethnicity, over the course of his career from 1942 to 1989, which spanned almost 50 years. Notwithstanding, his racial ethnicity was described using different terms in newspapers, magazines, and on albums.

On the inside flap of his debut album "Favoritos" (1943), Capitol described him as: "a handsome young American, born and reared in Los Angeles ..."

In a 1944 newspaper article, he was called: a "talented, 23-year-old Mexican".

In another newspaper article from 1944, he was described as: "... a fellow of Spanish extraction ..."

In a 1945 article, he was described as a 'Los Angeles-born Mexican lad'.

In a 1946 article, he was called: "an American Spaniard".

On the back cover of his album "The Magic of Andy Russell" (1958), RCA described his singing style, "... which stems from his Mexican-American upbringing ..."

Among many names, he has also been labeled as: "Hispano", "Latin", "Spanish-Mexican", "of Mexican parentage", "Mexican of Spanish descent", "a Californian of Mexican descent", "Mexican-Spanish", "mexicano-norteamericano", "norteamericano" and "Chicano".

=== The prodigal son returns ... ? ===
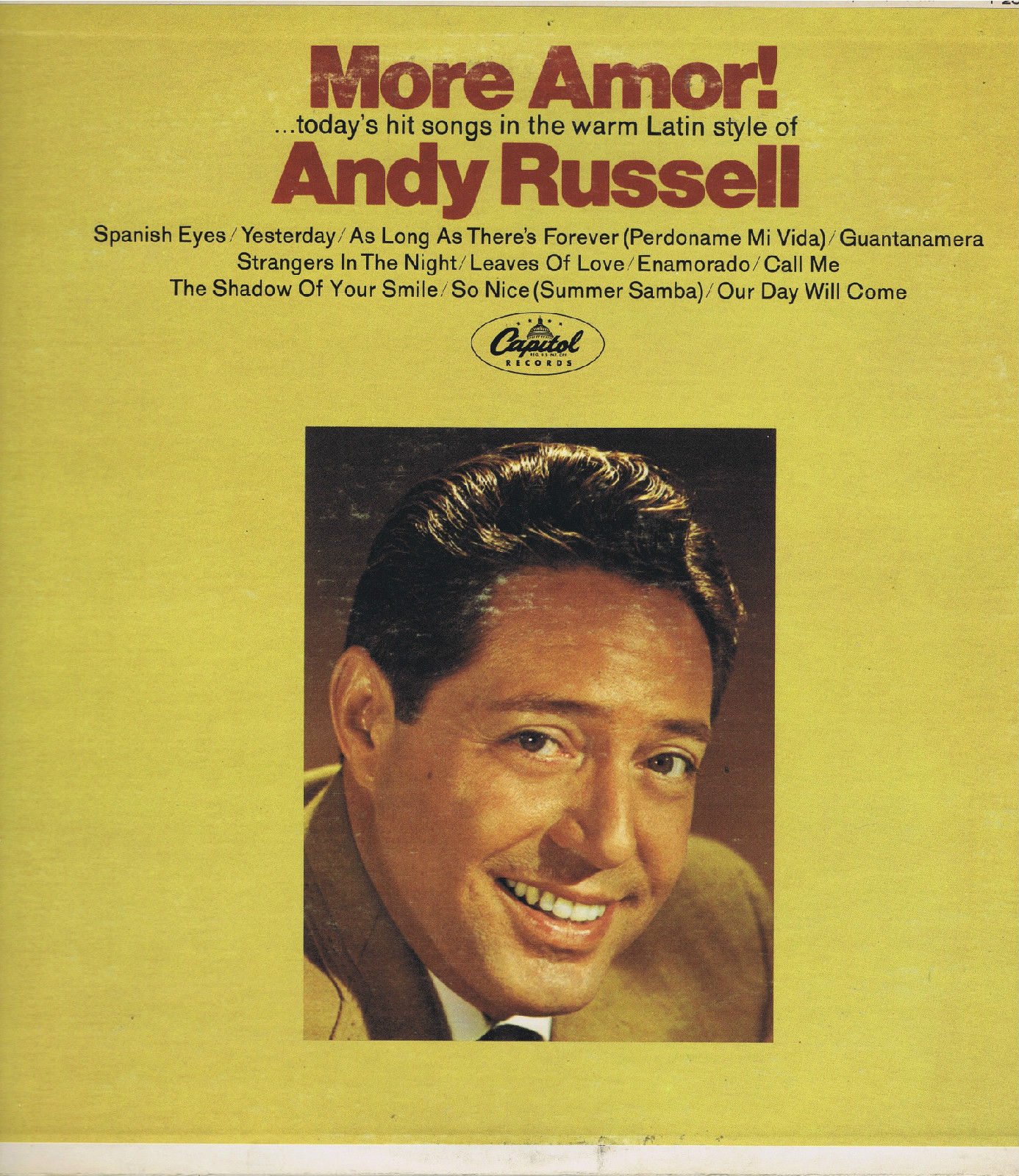
Andy Russell, "More Amor!" LP, Capitol Records, 1967

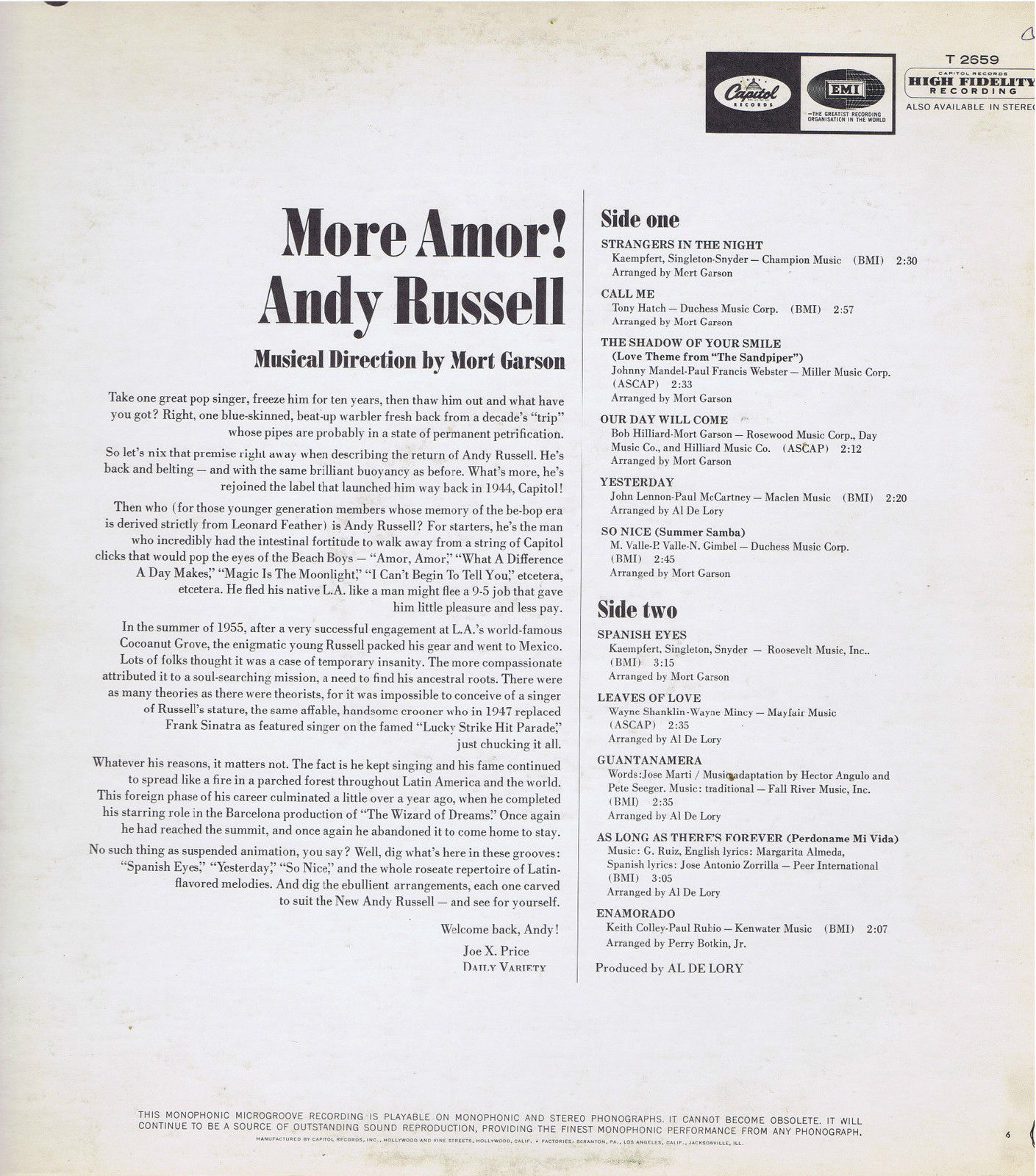
Andy Russell, "More Amor!" LP (back cover), Capitol Records, 1967

After releasing the Capitol singles "Longin'" and "Enamorado" in 1966 (neither charted), Russell's comeback album in the United States was "More Amor!" (Capitol Records, 1967). On the back cover, there is a certain awkwardness and palpable confusion in the explanation about why Russell had left the United States for Mexico, and why he had returned.

Russell apparently divorced his third wife, Velia Sánchez Belmont, sometime in the early 1960s (a September 7, 1963, newspaper article states that his new romance was the Countess Joaquina de Navas of Madrid). His television show in Argentina ended in 1964. His waning popularity was also evidenced by the popularity of a new wave of younger singers in Mexico, such as César Costa, Enrique Guzmán, and Alberto Vásquez, who in many ways, were his musical heirs. They took up the mantle that he had initially carried into Mexico, and these young singers performed Spanish covers of American and British Invasion hit songs of the 1960s to an enthusiastic, young female fan base, as Russell had once done as a crooner in the 1940s. Furthermore, and most tellingly, these younger singers were Mexican nationals, unlike Russell who was an American of Mexican ancestry.

Russell probably saw the writing on the wall. He had now become passé. All these reasons most likely played a factor in Russell looking toward the United States for a fresh start.

In any case, this time around, the visions of grandeur turned out to be a mirage, as none of the songs on "More Amor!" charted on Billboard. The album followed the same Russell formula: a nice balance of songs, some in English and some in his "bilingual style", which had proven so successful in the decade of the 1940s and in Latin America.

Russell made his first appearance in 11 years at the Chauteau Madrid nightclub in New York City. He subsequently performed in Las Vegas, at other nightclubs, and appeared as a guest on television programs. He also performed in Mexico and Latin America.

That same year another album followed: "... Such a Pretty World Today" (Capitol, 1967), this time with all songs sung in English, except for "Lady", the last chorus of which he sings in his "flawless Spanish". This was followed by a single, "I'm Not Through Missing You". (Capitol 45 rpm, 1967). This approach seemed to work better as both songs charted in the top ten of Billboard's Easy Listening Chart.

At this point, it may seem that Russell was nudging towards being the American singer who sang in English, while not totally abandoning the Latin singer persona, in order to gain a modicum of success in the American recording industry. Less was being said about his name change at this point, as many people already knew that he was the Latin or Mexican singer with the American-sounding name.

Russell considered his nationality to be, first and foremost, American but ethnically he was Mexican-American. He corrected people who said he was Spanish based on his appearance (tall, light-skinned, and hazel eyes) by stating that he was Mexican.

He found the term Mexican-American to be acceptable, but he had a difficult time accepting the term "Chicano".

He stated: "My parents were born in Mexico, but I hate the word 'Chicano'. I am an American."

In a later interview, he elaborated on the subject:

I hated the word 'Chicano' at that time, 'cause at that time it was that, 'He's nothing but a Chicano, you know?' That was a terrible word at that time. Yeah, 'Pachuco' or 'Chicano', you know? That's a horrible word. I says, 'I'm not Chicano. I'm Mexican American. First I'm Mexican because my mother and dad are Mexican and I'm Mexican, and I'm American 'cause I was born here. I'm a Mexican American, I'm not a Chicano, you know? I just didn't like that word. It stuck with me. I don't like it even today. I'm sorry, I don't like it ... Just don't like the sound.

— Source, Loza, Steven. (1993) Barrio Rhythm: Mexican American Music in Los Angeles. University of Illinois Press, p. 147

In the late 19th and early 20th century, the term "Chicano" was an insulting, disparaging term used by upper class Mexicans who lived in the United States to refer to indigent Mexican immigrants who had just crossed the border. Thus, Russell is not using the term as it was reclaimed and redefined as a source of pride and political power in the 1960s, although he does agree with the principal. In spite of this, Russell meant no offense or disrespect to those people who embraced the term Chicano; he just stated that it was not for him.

Steven Loza, director of Ethnic Musicology at the University of California, Los Angeles, and author of Barrio Rhythm: Mexican-American Music in Los Angeles may have had a different take than Russell on the term "Chicano" when he stated: "Chicano music is Andrew Russell ... He personified that whole experience."

== Charted hits ==
The following tables list records by Russell that were sold and charted in the United States. He also made recordings in Mexico, however these "received little exposure in the U.S. but were hits all over Latin America and in Spain." One would have to consult each country's record charts to see how Russell's records rated in each individual country for a complete overview.

Song	Date recorded	Date entered Billboard Hot 100 Record Chart	Highest position	Weeks on chart	Catalog number	Notes
"Bésame mucho" ("Kiss Me Much")	December 17, 1943	April 15, 1944	5	10	Capitol 149	With Al Sack and his Orchestra, composed by Consuelo Velázquez and Sunny Skylar
"Amor"	March 10, 1944	June 1, 1944	10	5	Capitol 156	With Al Sack and his Orchestra, composed by Sunny Skylar, Ricardo López Méndez, and Gabriel Ruíz.
"What a Diff'rence a Day Made" / "Cuando vuelva a tu lado"	May 19, 1944	October 21, 1944	8	14	Capitol 167	With Paul Weston and his Orchestra, composed by María Grever and Stanley Adams
"I Dream of You"	? 1944	December 30, 1944	5	5	Capitol 175	With Paul Weston and his Orchestra, composed by Osser and Goetschius
"I Can't Begin to Tell You"	? 1945	December 27, 1945	9	7	Capitol 221	With Paul Weston and his Orchestra, composed by James V. Monaco and Mack Gordon
"Laughing on the Outside (Crying on the Inside)"	February 28, 1946	May 2, 1946	4	7	Capitol 252	With Paul Weston and his Orchestra, composed by Bernie Wayne and Ben Raleigh
"They Say It's Wonderful"	February 28, 1946	May 11, 1946	5	10	Capitol 252	With Paul Weston and his Orchestra, composed by Irving Berlin
"Pretending"	May 17, 1946	June 1, 1946	8	10	Capitol 271	With Paul Weston and his Orchestra, composed by Al Sherman and Marty Symes
"Anniversary Song"	November 15, 1947	March 8, 1947	10	4	Capitol 368	With Paul Weston and his Orchestra, composed by Ion Ivanovici (as Iosif Ivanovici), Al Jolson & Saul Chaplin
"I'll Close My Eyes"	?	March 8, 1947	1	15	Capitol 342	With Paul Weston and his Orchestra, composed by Billy Reid & Buddy Kaye
"Je Vous Aime"	?	August 2, 1947	2	22	Capitol 417	With Paul Weston and his Orchestra, composed by Sam Coslow.
"Underneath the Arches"	?	September 25, 1948	9	13	Capitol 15183	With the Pied Pipers and unlisted Orchestra, composed by Bud Flanagan and Reg Connelly

Song	Date entered Billboard Adult Contemporary Record Chart	Highest position	Catalog number	Notes
"I'm Still Not Through Missin' You"	1967	10	Capitol 5971	composed by Manny Curtis (as Mann Curtis) and Larry Stock
"Your Love Is Everywhere"	1967	32	Capitol 2009	composed by Tony Hatch and Jackie Trent
"It's Such a Pretty World Today"	7/1967	1	Capitol 64080	composed by Dale Noe
"If My Heart Had Windows"	1968	29	Capitol 2072	composed by Dallas Frazier

== Filmography ==
Year	Title	Role	Notes
1944	Jam Session	Guitarist in Alvino Rey's Orchestra	Directed by Charles Barton, Uncredited
1945	The Stork Club	Jimmy "Jim" Jones	Directed by Hal Walker. Film debut. Performs "China Boy" drum solo and sings "If I had a Dozen Hearts" (duet with Betty Hutton) and "Love Me". Andy Russell performs a drum solo in the 1945 film The Stork Club Andy Russell and Betty Hutton sing a duet: "If I had a Dozen Hearts" in the 1945 film The Stork Club Andy Russell sings "Love Me" in the 1945 film The Stork Club
1946	Breakfast in Hollywood	Singer	Directed by Harold D. Schuster. Sings "If I Had a Wishing Ring", "Magic Is the Moonlight / "Te quiero, dijiste (Muñequita linda)"", and "Amor" Andy Russell sings "If I Had a Wishing Ring" in Breakfast in Hollywood (1946) Andy Russell sings "Magic Is the Moonlight"/"Te quiero dijiste (Muñequita linda)" in Breakfast in Hollywood (1946) Andy Russell Sings "Amor" in Breakfast in Hollywood (1946)
1946	Walt Disney's Make Mine Music (Animation)	Voice	Sings "Without You" ("Tres Palabras")
1947	Copacabana	Singer	Directed by Alfred E. Green. Sings "My Heart Was Doing a Bolero", "Stranger Things Have Happened", "He Hasn't Got a thing to Sell", and "Je Vous Aime".
1953	House Party (Short)	Singer	Co-stars with his wife Della. They sang "Don't Say Hello", "Just the Two of Us", "Sweet and Lovely", and "You Could Be Replaced".
1955	¡Qué bravas son las costeñas! (Coastal women are so temperamental!)	Tony López	Mexican production, directed by Roberto Rodríguez. Film debut in Mexican film. Sings "¡Viva el amor!" ("Hurrah for Love!"), "Bienvenida" ("Welcome"), "La Bamba", "Adiós, linda morena" ("Goodbye, Beautiful Brown-Skinned Girl"), and "Contigo en la distancia" ("With You in the Distance").
1956	Mi Canción Eres Tú (You are my Song)	Daniel Pérez	Mexican production, directed by Roberto Rodríguez. Sings: "Yo sabía" ("I knew"), "Muchachita" ("Little girl"), "Quiéreme mucho" ("Love Me Very Much"), "Destino" ("Destiny"), "Imprescindible" ("Beloved")
1956	¡Viva La Juventud! (Hurrah for the Young People!)	Pancho Andreú	Mexican production, directed by Fernando Cortés.
1956	Primavera en el Corazón (Spring in the Heart)	Andrés Valdés	Mexican production, directed by Roberto Rodríguez. Sings "Primavera en el corazón" ("Springtime in the Heart"), "Desesperadamente ("Desperately"), "Cha-cha-cha, Chavela", "Soy un extraño para tí ("I am a Stranger to You"), and "Copacabana (Donde la conocí)" ("Copacabana, Where I Met Her").
1959	Vístete, Cristina (Get dressed, Cristina)	Carlos Lata	Mexican production, directed by Miguel Morayta. Sings "Cita en México" ("Date in Mexico"), "Eres Tú" (It's You), "Amor, Amor", "Perfidia" ("Perfidy"), and "Vístete, Cristina" ("Get Dressed, Cristina").
1966	El Mago de los Sueños (in Spanish) (The Dream Wizard) (Animation)	Voice	Spanish production, directed by Francisco Macián. Sings "Soñarás" ("You Shall Dream").

== Discography ==
Album Titles:

- Favoritos (LP, Capitol, 1943)
- This is the Night (LP, Capitol, 1946)
- Without you / Tres palabras : from Walt Disney production "Make mine music" (LP, Capitol, 1946)
- The First Noël (La primera Navidad) (LP, Capitol, 1947)
- I'll Close my Eyes (LP, Capitol, 1947)
- Love notes from Andy Russell (LP, Capitol, 1948)
- The Magic of Andy Russell (LP, RCA Victor, 1958)
- Inolvidables del Cine Americano (Orfeón, 1959)
- Los Discos del Millón, Colección de Oro, The Golden Collection (LP, Mexico: Orfeon, 1960)
- La Hora del Romance, The Time for Romance (Dimsa, 1961)
- Canciones de Aquí y Allá (LP, RCA Victor Argentina, 1962)
- More Amor! (LP, Capitol, 1967)
- ... Such a Pretty World Today (LP, Capitol, 1967)
- Andy Russell (Barcelona Madrid : Belter, D.L. 1967)
- Andy Russell (Original radio series produced by AFRTS – Armed Forces Radio and Television Service. Duration: 30:00. Performer(s): Andy Russell, host; various performers. Description: 23 sound discs)
- Internacional/ International (LP, Discos Latin International, 1973)
- Andy Russell (Madrid : edita y distribuye Gramusic, D.L. 1973)
- Yesterday, Now ... and Forever / Ayer, Hoy ... y Siempre (LP, Kim Records, 1982)
- Spotlight on – Andy Russell (compilation) (CD, Capitol, 1995)
- El Crooner Latino de Hollywood, Andy Russell, Soy un Extraño (compilation) (CD, Alma Records, 2003)
- Andy Russell con Accento Español (compilation, remastered) (CD, Rama Lama Music, 2011)
- Andy Russell 15 Grandes Éxitos en Español (Imex Media, Codex 2014)

V-Discs

- No.337B: "Magic Is the Moonlight" "I Dream of You" (issued December 1944)
- No.341B: "Don't You Notice Anything New" "I'll See You in My Dreams" (issued January 1945)
- No.450B: "Negra Consentida" (issued June 1945)
- No.385B: "After Awhile" "Sweet Dreams, Sweetheart" (issued March 1945)
- No.631B: "La Borrachita" "Time Was" (issued May 1947)

== Radio appearances ==
Year	Program	Episode/source
1952	Musical Comedy Theater	Going Hollywood
