= Pretending (Al Sherman song) =

"Pretending" is a song with music and lyrics by Al Sherman and Marty Symes. It was recorded by Andy Russell with the Paul Weston Orchestra (Capitol), Bing Crosby (singing) and Les Paul playing lead guitar on May 15, 1946 (Decca), Kate Smith (Columbia) and Margaret Whiting from the Barry Wood Show among others. The song was published in New York City by Criterion Music Corporation.

The recording by Andy Russell was released by Capitol Records as catalog number 271. It reached the Billboard magazine Best Seller chart on October 4, 1946 at #10, its only week on the chart.
