= The Phillips Music Company =

American music store

- Company type: Privately held company
- Industry: Music
- Founded: 1935; 90 years ago
- Founders: Bill Phillips
- Defunct: 1989
- Headquarters: Boyle Heights, California, USA
- Products: Musical instruments, records, sheet music, electronics
- Services: Lessons, recording

The Phillips Music Company was a music store in Boyle Heights, Los Angeles that operated from 1935 to 1989. It was situated at 2455 Brooklyn Avenue and run by musician William "Bill" Phillips (born 1910 as William Isaacs). The store sold records, sheet music, instruments, radios, televisions, electronic appliances, and phonographs. The store became involved in the multiculturalism of Boyle Heights, particularly connecting the Mexican, Japanese, and Jewish communities.

== Early history ==
Bill Philips, a Jewish native of Rochester, met Hannah Catch in the Jewish community of Brooklyn Avenue in Boyle Heights. They married in 1933 and toured the U.S in vaudeville bands before settling back in Boyle Heights. In 1936, Phillips opened the Phillips Music Company storefront on Brooklyn Avenue, in a spot that is now part of Cesar Chavez Avenue. The store carried a wide array of instruments, as well as records in Latin jazz, classical rock, Cuban mambo, and Yiddish swing. It became a gathering spot for the multicultural community in Boyle Heights, with Jewish, Mexican, and Japanese children enjoying music and recording demos there. Bill Phillips would often give free lessons and donate instruments to local school music programs in order to help the community. He had also allowed Kenji Taniguchi, a friend who had recently left the Japanese internment camps, to use a section of his store rent-free to sell sporting goods until he could open his own store. Bill's son Bruce Phillips worked in the store as a teenager, helping musicians rent amplifiers and listening to them jam.

== Closing and legacy ==
Boyle Heights was an area known for its diversity, including Jews, Latinos, (mainly Chicanos), Yugoslav (Serbian and Croatian) immigrants, Portuguese people, and Japanese Americans living in the neighborhood from 1920 through the 1960s. Over time, many ethnic groups left Boyle Heights. In 1940, the Boyle Heights population consisted of about 35,000 Jewish Americans, 15,000 Mexican Americans, and 5,000 Japanese Americans. In 2011, 95% of the population was Latino and Hispanic. Bruce Philips attributed this to redlining preventing people from buying homes, as well as the construction of freeways through the community; the home where Bill and Hannah had met had been demolished for a freeway. This made it less viable for middle class people of all ethnic groups to stay, including the Jewish Philips family. They eventually moved to the Crenshaw District, and the Philips Music Store closed in 1989. Bill Philips died in 1995 at the age of 85.

Various music groups such Los Lobos, Thee Midniters, and Ruben and the Jets had members who had visited the Philips Music Company Store to play or to receive lessons and gear, often for free. The store has also been recognized as a testament to the multiculturalism of Boyle Heights and L.A as a whole. In August 2011, a performance titled "A Night at the Phillips Music Company" was held at Bunker Hill's California Plaza to pay homage to the Philips Music Company and Boyle Heights' multicultural legacy. The performances included acts like Little Willie G of Thee Midniters, Ollin, Ruben Guevera and the Eastside Lovers, Hiroshima, La Santa Cecilia, and Ceci Bastida.
