= Paramount Television Network =

American television network

- Type: Defunct broadcast television network
- Country: United States
- Broadcast area: Nationwide (primarily through ad-hoc network of affiliates)

Ownership
- Owner: Paramount Pictures
- Key people: Paul Raibourn (President, Paramount Television Productions); Klaus Landsberg (Producer; VP, Paramount Television Productions); George T. Shupert (Executive, Program Sales, Paramount Television Productions); Burt Balaban (Executive, Programming); John Howell (Executive, Sales); Bernard Goodwin (VP, Paramount Television Productions)

History
- Launched: 1948; 78 years ago
- Closed: 1956; 70 years ago

The Paramount Television Network, Inc. was a venture by American film corporation Paramount Pictures to organize a television network in the late 1940s. The company-built television stations KTLA in Los Angeles and WBKB in Chicago; it also invested $400,000 in the DuMont Television Network, which operated stations WABD in New York City, WTTG in Washington, D.C., and WDTV in Pittsburgh. Escalating disputes between Paramount and DuMont concerning breaches of contract, company control, and network competition erupted regularly between 1940 and 1956, culminating in the DuMont Network's dismantling. Television historian Timothy White called the clash between the two companies "one of the most unfortunate and dramatic episodes in the early history of the television industry."

The Paramount Television Network aired several programs, including the Emmy Award-winning children's series Time for Beany. Filmed in Hollywood, the programs were distributed to an ad-hoc network of stations across the United States. The network signed affiliation agreements with more than 50 television stations in 1950; despite this, most of Paramount's series were not widely viewed outside the West Coast. The Federal Communications Commission (FCC), which filed suit against Paramount for antitrust violations, prevented the studio from acquiring additional television stations. Paramount executives eventually gave up on the idea of a television network, and continued to produce series for other networks. In 1995, after four decades of television production for other companies, Paramount re-entered the broadcast network field when the company and Chris-Craft Industries launched the United Paramount Network (UPN), a television network that operated until 2006. CBS Studios now owns Paramount's longtime television division, and it has since founded a second version of Paramount Television under Viacom ownership. Both of these (along with the former WDTV, now KDKA-TV) are now part of Skydance.

== Origins ==
William Wadsworth Hodkinson founded American film corporation Paramount Pictures in 1914. Famous Players–Lasky Corporation acquired the company in 1916 and by the 1920s Paramount became a key player in Hollywood. The company founded or acquired many film production and exhibition properties; among these were the 2,000-screen theater chain United Paramount Theatres (UPT), newsreel service Paramount News, the Famous Players theater chain in Canada and animation studio Famous Studios. The company became one of the "big five" Hollywood studios. By the 1940s, however, Paramount was the target of several antitrust lawsuits by the federal government, culminating with U.S. vs. Paramount Pictures, et al. (1948), which found that Paramount and other studios conducted monopolistic practices. Due to this Supreme Court decision, the Federal Communications Commission (FCC) forced Paramount to sell off its theater division in 1949.

As early as 1937, executives at Paramount Pictures were interested in the new medium of television. The following year, Paramount purchased a minority interest in DuMont Laboratories, a pioneer in early television technology founded by Dr. Allen B. DuMont. Relations between Paramount and DuMont staff were strained by 1940, when Paramount, without DuMont, opened Chicago television station WBKB and Los Angeles station KTLA. Dr. DuMont claimed that the original 1937 acquisition proposal required Paramount to expand its television interests "through DuMont". Paramount representative Paul Raibourn denied that any such restriction was ever discussed (a 1953 examination of the original draft document vindicated DuMont on this point). The stock in DuMont, coupled with the Chicago and Los Angeles stations, gave Paramount full or partial ownership of four of the first nine television stations in the United States.

DuMont Laboratories launched the DuMont Television Network in 1946. Despite Paramount's partial ownership of DuMont, Paramount's two stations never aired television programs from DuMont's television network (with the exception of KTLA, which ran DuMont programs for one year from 1947 to 1948), and competed against DuMont's affiliates in Los Angeles and Chicago. According to authors Auter and Boyd, Paramount's construction of KTLA and WBKB and its subsequent launch of the Paramount Television Network "undercut" DuMont, a company it had invested in.

KTLA began commercial broadcasts on January 22, 1947; its first evening broadcast was hosted by Bob Hope and featured Kirk Douglas, William Bendix, Dorothy Lamour, William Demarest, Ray Milland and Cecil B. DeMille. KTLA was the first commercial television station to sign on west of the Mississippi River. Although other Los Angeles television stations operated experimentally and eventually received commercial licenses, KTLA had a head start as the first commercially-licensed station in Los Angeles. The revenue stream from commercials helped to fund more professional programming, therefore generating a large viewership; a 1949 audience estimate from the C. E. Hooper company indicated that KTLA was broadcasting 28 of the top 30 television series in Los Angeles.

== Launch ==
Paramount's television division, Television Productions, Inc., created the Paramount Television Network in 1948. A full-page advertisement announcing the newly created network, with KTLA as the flagship station, ran in Billboard on May 22 of that year. Filming of programs took place at KTLA; a coaxial cable link between KTLA and KFMB-TV in San Diego transmitted a live signal to San Diego viewers. Other television stations across the United States received Paramount programs via kinescope recording for airing; these filmed series allowed stations to "fill in" their schedules during hours when ABC, NBC, CBS and DuMont were not broadcasting shows, or when station managers preferred Paramount's filmed offerings to those of the four networks. Station managers at WBKB-TV in Chicago also had plans to distribute their own kinescoped programs.

Paramount management planned to acquire additional owned-and-operated stations ("O&Os"); the company applied to the FCC for additional stations in San Francisco, Detroit and Boston. Officials at the FCC, however, denied Paramount's applications. A few years earlier, the federal regulator had placed a five-station cap on all television networks: no network was allowed to own more than five VHF television stations. Paramount was hampered by its minority stake in the DuMont Television Network. Although both DuMont and Paramount executives stated that the companies were separate, the FCC ruled that Paramount's partial ownership of DuMont meant that DuMont and Paramount were in theory branches of the same company. Since DuMont owned three television stations and Paramount owned two, the federal agency ruled neither network could acquire additional television stations. The FCC requested that Paramount relinquish its stake in DuMont, but Paramount refused. According to television historian William Boddy, "Paramount's checkered antitrust history" helped convince the FCC that Paramount controlled DuMont. Both television networks suffered as a result, with neither company being able to acquire five O&Os. Meanwhile, CBS, ABC and NBC had each acquired the maximum of five stations by the mid-1950s.

Author Timothy White has called Paramount's efforts to launch its own television service, which directly competed with the DuMont Television Network, an unwise decision – Paramount in effect was competing with itself. The resulting ill feelings between Paramount's and DuMont's executives continued to escalate throughout the early 1950s, and the lack of cooperation hindered both entities' network plans. According to White, by 1953, even the public pretense of cooperation between Paramount and DuMont was gone.

== Programs ==
The Paramount Television Network aired several television series during its years of operations. The following is a partial list:

- Adventures in Music – hosted by the "godfather of exotica", Korla Pandit, playing the Novachord and Hammond Organ
- Armchair Detective – a half-hour crime reenactment series produced at KTLA that aired on CBS and Paramount stations
- Bandstand Revue – a 30-minute-long music program sponsored by Ralston Purina
- Dixie Showboat – a weekly country and western musical variety program
- Frosty Frolics – an ice skating show that also briefly aired (for four weeks) on ABC
- Harry Owens' Royal Hawaiians – a series featuring Hawaiian music which aired in Los Angeles and San Francisco and later moved to the CBS television network
- Hollywood Opportunity – a talent show
- Hollywood Reel – a Hollywood gossip program narrated by Hollywood columnist Erskine Johnson
- Hollywood Wrestling – an early professional wrestling series
- Latin Cruise – a musical series starring Bobby Ramos
- Magazine of the Week – a women's program
- Meet Me in Hollywood – a man on the street interview series that was broadcast from the famed intersection of Hollywood Boulevard and Vine Street
- Movietown, RSVP – a charades program
- Olympic Wrestling – another professional wrestling series
- Sandy Dreams – a children's program that also briefly aired on ABC stations
- The Spade Cooley Show – a variety program hosted by Spade Cooley and that featured Dick Lane, Anita Aros, Phil Gray, and Kay Cee Jones
- Time for Beany – a children's series that received an Emmy Award in 1949, in the category Best Children's Show
- Yer Ole Buddy – a comedy program

Various press releases indicated that other KTLA series would be offered on the network. There is no indication, however, that the following series aired outside Los Angeles:

- Girls Only – a comedy/drama starring Mary Gordon as an aging ex-actress with four young female charges
- The Ina Ray Hutton Show – a series featuring bandleader Ina Ray Hutton
- The Lawrence Welk Show – a musical program starring Lawrence Welk that moved to ABC in summer 1955
- Mayfair Mystery House – a 39-episode drama filmed in England (only 13 episodes were completed)
- Spade Cooley's Western Varieties – another series featuring Spade Cooley

== Staff ==
Paul Raibourn served as the president of Paramount Television Productions. Raibourn was also appointed vice president of Paramount Pictures Corporation, and, due to Paramount's minority interest in DuMont, was installed as treasurer of the DuMont Television Network. This appointment created another point of conflict between Paramount and DuMont. According to Leonard Goldenson, president of ABC during this era, Raibourn "constantly nitpicked and needled [Allen DuMont] over the smallest expenditures. DuMont came to the point where, psychologically, he thought he couldn't do anything without Raibourn's approval." Raibourn trimmed DuMont's budgets at a time when the network should have been expanding. Goldenson credits Raibourn as one of the reasons ABC eventually became a successful, established television network while the DuMont network failed: "the name of the television game is programs. If you won't put money into programs, you won't succeed."

Klaus Landsberg, a German immigrant, produced many Paramount Television Network series; he also served as one of the company's vice presidents and as KTLA's general manager. Other Paramount executives included George T. Shupert, Paramount Television Productions' program sales executive; Burt Balaban, programming executive; John Howell, sales executive; and Bernard Goodwin, a director and vice president of Paramount Television Productions.

== Affiliates ==
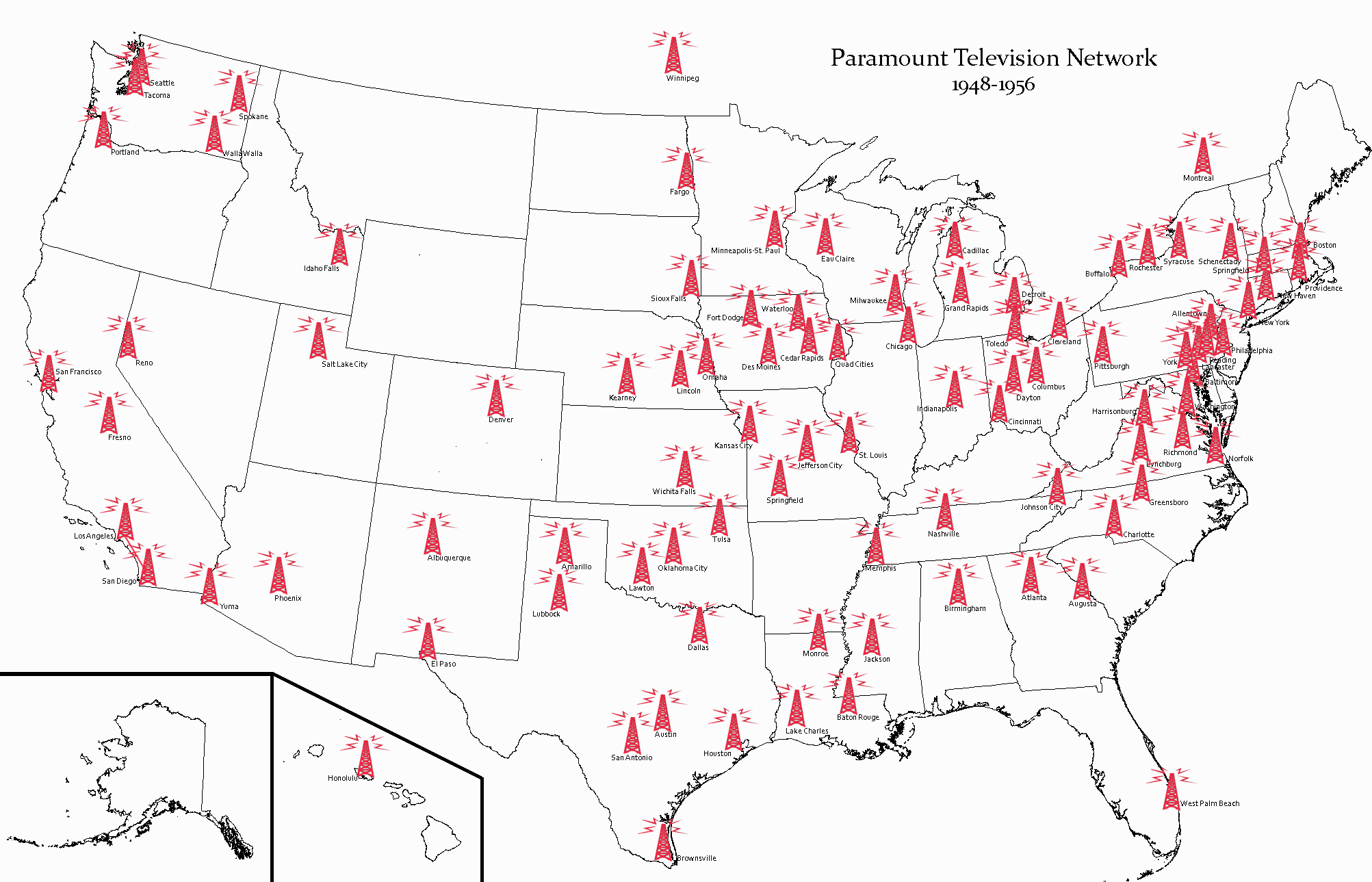
Paramount's network stretched from Honolulu to Boston. Each symbol represents a broadcasting station.

During the 1940s and 1950s, television networks in the United States were restricted to owning no more than five local VHF television stations. This system, which evolved from similar FCC regulations governing radio, resulted in executives of television networks forming alliances with local station owners in order to air network programs across the U.S. These alliances were codified in network affiliation contracts; Paramount Television Network staff required affiliate station managers to sign a network contract even if the station only aired one Paramount program. At its peak in late 1950, the Paramount Television Network was distributing five television series a week to over 40 affiliated television stations. Most Paramount stations were in the United States, but at least two were Canadian stations.

During this era, American television programs were either broadcast live to local television stations via microwave relay and AT&T's coaxial cable service or were recorded on kinescope and delivered through the mail to local stations. The live broadcast method was expensive, but was preferred by executives at each of the four major U.S. television networks (ABC, NBC, CBS and DuMont); in 1954, DuMont alone spent $3 million on live television broadcasts. The major networks sent kinescopes to stations when live transmissions were not possible. "Film networks", which sent out only prerecorded material, also existed; kinescopes were cheap to produce and cost little to mail. Paramount's television service was a hybrid of the two systems, with a live connection between KTLA and KFMB-TV in San Diego, and other affiliates broadcasting programs from kinescope recordings. Paramount executives considered a live connection between Los Angeles and San Francisco too expensive. Uniquely, Paramount's The Harry Owens Show was broadcast live in Los Angeles and San Francisco by having the program's performers and crew commute via airplane between the two stations for sequential performances.

The table below lists stations that carried Paramount Television Network programs, including the company's two owned-and-operated stations, KTLA and WBKB. DuMont's three VHF stations, WABD, WTTG and WDTV, which aired little or no Paramount programming but which the FCC ruled were O&Os of the same entity, also appear in this list. Also included are DuMont's two short-lived UHF licenses: KCTY-TV – which only operated for a few months, and WHK-TV – which never signed on. A number of stations carried Armchair Detective, Sandy Dreams and Frosty Frolics when those programs aired on CBS and ABC. Stations that aired those programs as part of an ABC or CBS affiliation are not shown in the table below.

Station	City	State or province	Paramount programs aired
KOAT-TV	Albuquerque	New Mexico	Hollywood Wrestling
WLEV-TV	Allentown	Pennsylvania	Hollywood Wrestling
KFDA-TV	Amarillo	Texas	Hollywood Wrestling
WSB-TV	Atlanta	Georgia	Hollywood Wrestling
WJBF	Augusta	Georgia	Hollywood Wrestling
KMMT-TV	Austin	Minnesota	Hollywood Wrestling
WBAL-TV	Baltimore	Maryland	Hollywood Wrestling (c. 1951)
WAAM-TV	Baltimore	Maryland	Hollywood Wrestling (c. 1955); Sandy Dreams; Time For Beany
WAFB	Baton Rouge	Louisiana	Time For Beany
WAFM-TV	Birmingham	Alabama	Time For Beany (1950–1951)
WBRC	Birmingham	Alabama	Hollywood Reel; Time For Beany (1953)
WNAC-TV	Boston	Massachusetts	Armchair Detective; Dixie Showboat; Hollywood Reel; Hollywood Wrestling; Time For Beany
KGBT-TV	Brownsville	Texas	Hollywood Wrestling
WBEN-TV	Buffalo	New York	Hollywood Reel; Time For Beany
WWTV	Cadillac	Michigan	Hollywood Wrestling
KCRG-TV	Cedar Rapids	Iowa	Hollywood Wrestling
WBTV	Charlotte	North Carolina	Hollywood Wrestling
WBKB	Chicago	Illinois	Hollywood Reel; Hollywood Wrestling; Olympic Wrestling; Time For Beany
WENR-TV	Chicago	Illinois	Frosty Frolics; Hollywood Reel (c. 1950)
WGN-TV	Chicago	Illinois	Time For Beany (after October 1952)
WCPO-TV	Cincinnati	Ohio	Dixie Showboat; Hollywood Wrestling
WKRC-TV	Cincinnati	Ohio	Bandstand Revue; Time For Beany
WEWS-TV	Cleveland	Ohio	Frosty Frolics; Hollywood Reel (c. 1952); Time For Beany (c. 1953)
WJW-TV	Cleveland	Ohio	Armchair Detective; Bandstand Revue (mid-1955); Hollywood Wrestling; Time For Beany (c. 1950)
WNBK	Cleveland	Ohio	Bandstand Revue (late 1955); Hollywood Reel (c. 1950)
WBNS-TV	Columbus	Ohio	Hollywood Reel; Time For Beany
KBTV	Dallas	Texas	Armchair Detective; Hollywood Wrestling; Time For Beany (c. 1950); 4.75 hrs of Paramount per wk
KRLD-TV	Dallas	Texas	Time For Beany (c. 1953)
WOC-TV	Davenport	Iowa	Dixie Showboat; Hollywood Reel; Hollywood Wrestling
WHIO-TV	Dayton	Ohio	Hollywood Wrestling
KBTV	Denver	Colorado	Hollywood Reel; Hollywood Wrestling
KFEL-TV	Denver	Colorado	Hollywood Wrestling
WOI-TV	Des Moines	Iowa	Hollywood Reel
WWJ-TV	Detroit	Michigan	Bandstand Revue (mid-1955); Time For Beany (c. 1953)
WJBK-TV	Detroit	Michigan	Bandstand Revue (late 1955); Time For Beany (c. 1952)
WEAU-TV	Eau Claire	Wisconsin	Hollywood Wrestling
KTSM-TV	El Paso	Texas	Time For Beany
WDAY-TV	Fargo	North Dakota	Hollywood Wrestling
KQTV	Fort Dodge	Iowa	Hollywood Wrestling
KMJ-TV	Fresno	California	Time For Beany
WOOD-TV	Grand Rapids	Michigan	Hollywood Wrestling
WFMY-TV	Greensboro	North Carolina	Hollywood Wrestling
WSVA-TV	Harrisonburg	Virginia	Hollywood Wrestling
KGMB	Honolulu	Hawaii	Time For Beany
KPRC-TV	Houston	Texas	Hollywood Wrestling; Time For Beany
KID-TV	Idaho Falls	Idaho	Hollywood Wrestling
WFBM-TV	Indianapolis	Indiana	Dixie Showboat; Hollywood Reel; Hollywood Wrestling; Time For Beany
WJTV	Jackson	Mississippi	Hollywood Wrestling
KRCG	Jefferson City	Missouri	Hollywood Wrestling
WJHL-TV	Johnson City	Tennessee	Hollywood Wrestling
KCMO-TV	Kansas City	Missouri	Hollywood Wrestling
KCTY-TV	Kansas City	Missouri
WDAF-TV	Kansas City	Missouri	Hollywood Reel
KHOL-TV	Kearney	Nebraska	Hollywood Wrestling
KPLC	Lake Charles	Louisiana	Hollywood Wrestling
WGAL	Lancaster	Pennsylvania	Hollywood Wrestling
KSWO-TV	Lawton	Oklahoma	Time For Beany; Hollywood Wrestling
KOLN	Lincoln	Nebraska	Time For Beany
KTLA	Los Angeles	California	originated programs
	Louisville	Kentucky	Hollywood Wrestling
KDUB-TV	Lubbock	Texas	Time For Beany
WLVA-TV	Lynchburg	Virginia	Hollywood Wrestling
WHBQ-TV	Memphis	Tennessee	Hollywood Wrestling
WTVW	Milwaukee	Wisconsin	Bandstand Revue (late 1955); Hollywood Wrestling
WTMJ-TV	Milwaukee	Wisconsin	Bandstand Revue (mid-1955); Hollywood Reel
KEYD-TV	Minneapolis	Minnesota	Hollywood Wrestling
WCCO-TV	Minneapolis	Minnesota	Time For Beany
KNOE-TV	Monroe	Louisiana	Hollywood Wrestling
CBMT-DT	Montreal	Quebec	Hollywood Wrestling
WSM-TV	Nashville	Tennessee	Hollywood Wrestling (1949–1951)
WSIX-TV	Nashville	Tennessee	Hollywood Wrestling (1954–1955)
WNHC-TV	New Haven	Connecticut	Armchair Detective; Time For Beany
WDSU	New Orleans	Louisiana	Dixie Showboat; Time For Beany
WABD	New York City	New York
WOR-TV	New York City	New York	Time For Beany
WPIX	New York City	New York	Dixie Showboat
	Norfolk	Virginia	Hollywood Wrestling
KWTV	Oklahoma City	Oklahoma	Hollywood Wrestling
WKY-TV	Oklahoma City	Oklahoma	Time For Beany
KMTV-TV	Omaha	Nebraska	Hollywood Wrestling
WOW-TV	Omaha	Nebraska	Hollywood Reel
WCAU	Philadelphia	Pennsylvania	Armchair Detective; Hollywood Wrestling; Time For Beany (c. 1953)
WFIL-TV	Philadelphia	Pennsylvania	Frosty Frolics; Hollywood Reel; Sandy Dreams; Time For Beany (c. 1950)
KPHO-TV	Phoenix	Arizona	Time For Beany
WDTV	Pittsburgh	Pennsylvania	Hollywood Reel
KPTV	Portland	Oregon	Hollywood Reel; Hollywood Wrestling; Bandstand Revue; Time For Beany
WJAR	Providence	Rhode Island	Bandstand Revue; Time For Beany
	Providence	Rhode Island	Hollywood Wrestling
	Reading	Pennsylvania	Hollywood Wrestling
KZTV	Reno	Nevada	Bandstand Revue; Hollywood Wrestling; Time For Beany
WTVR-TV	Richmond	Virginia	Hollywood Wrestling
KROC-TV	Rochester	Minnesota	Hollywood Wrestling
	Rochester	New York	Hollywood Reel
WHBF-TV	Rock Island	Illinois	Time For Beany
KEMO	St. Louis	Missouri	Hollywood Wrestling
KSD-TV	St. Louis	Missouri	Bandstand Revue; Time For Beany; Hollywood Reel
KSTP-TV	St. Paul	Minnesota	Bandstand Revue; Hollywood Wrestling
KDYL-TV	Salt Lake City	Utah	Time For Beany
KSL-TV	Salt Lake City	Utah	Hollywood Reel; Hollywood Wrestling
KEYL	San Antonio	Texas	Armchair Detective; Latin Cruise; Hollywood Reel; Hollywood Wrestling; Movietown, RSVP; Time For Beany
KFMB-TV	San Diego	California	Hollywood Opportunity; Magazine of the Week; Meet Me in Hollywood; Time For Beany; Your Old Buddy; Coaxial cable feeds 6 hrs. of Paramount per wk.
KGO-TV	San Francisco	California	Harry Owens Show (c. 1951); Hollywood Reel; Hollywood Wrestling; Sandy Dreams
KPIX	San Francisco	California	Bandstand Revue; Frosty Frolics; Harry Owens Show (c. 1952); Time For Beany
WRGB	Schenectady	New York	Time For Beany
KING-TV	Seattle	Washington	Dixie Showboat; Time For Beany
KMO-TV/KTVW	Seattle/Tacoma	Washington	Hollywood Wrestling
KOMO-TV	Seattle	Washington	Bandstand Revue; Hollywood Wrestling
KELO-TV	Sioux Falls	South Dakota	Hollywood Wrestling
KHQ-TV	Spokane	Washington	Time For Beany
WWLP	Springfield	Massachusetts	Time For Beany
KTTS-TV	Springfield	Missouri	Time For Beany
WHEN-TV	Syracuse	New York	Hollywood Reel
WSYR-TV	Syracuse	New York	Hollywood Wrestling
KTNT-TV	Tacoma	Washington	Bandstand Revue
WSPD-TV	Toledo	Ohio	Hollywood Wrestling
KOTV	Tulsa	Oklahoma	Hollywood Wrestling (c. 1954)
KTVX	Tulsa	Oklahoma	Hollywood Wrestling (c. 1955)
WTOP-TV	Washington	District of Columbia	Bandstand Revue; Time For Beany (c. 1951)
WTTG	Washington	District of Columbia	Hollywood Reel; Time For Beany (c. 1952)
KWWL	Waterloo	Iowa	Hollywood Wrestling
WSAU-TV	Wausau	Wisconsin	Hollywood Wrestling
WEAT-TV	West Palm Beach	Florida	Hollywood Wrestling
KTVH	Wichita	Kansas	Hollywood Wrestling
CBWT	Winnipeg	Manitoba	Hollywood Wrestling
WSBA-TV	York	Pennsylvania	Hollywood Wrestling
KIVA	Yuma	Arizona	Hollywood Wrestling

== End of network ==
In May 1951, ABC chairman Edward J. Noble and United Paramount Theatres president Leonard Goldenson announced a proposed merger between their companies. The plan was to merge ABC and its five television stations with United Paramount Theatres, a company only recently spun off from Paramount Pictures. UPT also owned the network's Chicago station, WBKB; that station would have to be sold in order for the merged company to stay under the five-station cap. Because the proposed merger involved the sale of a television station, it required the approval of the FCC, which opened a hearing on the issue that August. The proposed deal was complex, and would affect many parties involved in television broadcasting, including Paramount, DuMont, and CBS (CBS executives wanted to purchase WBKB). During the hearing, Allen DuMont asked the FCC to force Paramount to sell its share of the DuMont Network. He stated that Paramount in effect owned two television networks, the PTN and DuMont; the FCC had similarly forced NBC to sell off one of its two radio networks eight years earlier due to concerns about multi-network ownership. Paramount executives, however, denied ever having operated a television network. Evidence presented against Paramount included network affiliation contracts and advertisements for the Paramount Television Network from 1951. Despite Paramount executives' testimony, advertisements for the Paramount Television Network ran as late as 1952.

After a grueling 18-month trial, the federal agency allowed the ABC-UPT merger, but never ruled on Paramount's partial ownership of a second network; Paramount was allowed to retain its shares in DuMont. Leo Resnick, hearing examiner for the Commission, concluded that Paramount did not control DuMont, but the FCC rejected this portion of Resnick's findings, restricting Paramount and DuMont to a total of five stations. The commissioners had not forgotten Paramount's previous antitrust violations, and believed Paramount executives were attempting to control television by operating two television networks. According to White, the FCC's ruling "ensured that television broadcasting would be controlled by the same three companies that had dominated radio broadcasting, thus fostering a lack of diversity in both station and network ownership".

The February 1953 merger of ABC and United Paramount Theatres lead to the divestiture of WBKB (now WBBM-TV), which was sold to CBS. Paramount retained KTLA and applied to the FCC for a new station in Boston, but the construction permit was never granted. By this time, Paramount's television arm was called Paramount TV Productions, Incorporated; Paramount ceased using the PTN name. The company continued to distribute programs nationally, however, and continued to sign network affiliation agreements with local television stations.

With just one owned-and-operated station, Paramount's program service never gelled into a true television network; television historians such as Alex McNeil (1996) consider Paramount programs syndicated rather than network series. While the Paramount series Hollywood Wrestling and Time For Beany were widely seen on stations across the United States, most other Paramount television programs aired in only a handful of markets (another exception, Hollywood Reel, aired in fourteen major cities in 1950).

Paramount's revenues were much smaller than those of a true television network, and gradually Paramount began losing program sponsors or ended production on formerly-popular television series. American Vitamin Corporation, Paramount's sponsor for both The Spade Cooley Show and Frosty Frolics, pulled its $25,000 weekly sponsorship in October 1951. In June 1953, it was announced that Time For Beany and Paramount Television Productions were "calling it a day". Paramount ended production of its flagship series in October 1953; rival Los Angeles station KTTV and independent distributor Consolidated Television respectively took over production and distribution of Time For Beany. Independent distributor Cinema-Vue took over Hollywood Wrestling. By late 1955, Billboard reported the Paramount Network consisted of just 15 stations airing Bandstand Revue. Billboard called this a "sort of" network. Management changes at KTLA, coupled with low local ratings, caused the cancellation of Bandstand Revue in October 1956. Klaus Landsberg, who had produced many of the series for KTLA, died in September 1956 and the new station manager made what Billboard called "sweeping changes" at the station.

By the autumn of 1955, Hollywood insiders were predicting that Paramount would launch a major television network using KTLA and the DuMont stations as charters. Articles reported that Paramount was seeking television scripts, and was constructing theaters and studios that rivaled those of ABC, CBS and NBC. In a dramatic move, Paramount's board of directors seized control of DuMont Laboratories in a boardroom coup in August 1955. Paramount executives replaced DuMont's board of directors, Dr. DuMont was removed as president of the company, and DuMont Network operations ceased the following year. However, no combined Paramount-DuMont network ever materialized; according to television historian Timothy White, by this time "a television network was no longer among Paramount's plans for exploitation of the small screen"; some of the primary and secondary affiliates, and even some of the programming of both networks, migrated to the emerging, similarly loosely-scheduled NTA Film Network. Paramount sold its interest in DuMont (by this time renamed as the "Metropolitan Broadcasting Company") in 1959; the sale ended Paramount's first ventures into network television.

== Paramount's later involvement with television ==
Despite Paramount's failure to build a national broadcast television network, the company retained KTLA, and executives at Paramount continued to toy with the idea of entering the television medium once more. Paramount sold its library of shorts and cartoons in separate deals to U.M. & M. TV Corporation, Associated Artists Productions and Harvey Comics (the Superman cartoons were already sold to National Comics when Paramount's license to Superman expired). In 1957, Paramount sold most of its pre-1950 sound live action feature film library to EMKA, Ltd., a subsidiary of MCA. The live action films would end up with what became Universal Television after MCA bought Universal Pictures in 1962. KTLA was eventually sold to Golden West Broadcasters, a company owned by actor and singer Gene Autry, for $12 million in 1964.

After acquiring Desilu Productions in 1967, the company continued to produce series for the "big three" broadcast networks. Among them were Here's Lucy, Mission: Impossible and Mannix for CBS; The Brady Bunch, The Odd Couple and Happy Days for ABC; and (in later years) Family Ties and Cheers for NBC.

In 1978, Paramount CEO Barry Diller planned to launch the Paramount Television Service, a new "fourth television network"; its programs would have aired only one night a week. 30 "Movies of the Week" would have followed Star Trek: Phase II on Saturday nights. This plan was aborted when head of Gulf and Western Industries (Paramount's parent company at the time), Charles Bluhdorn, canceled the project for fear of bleeding money; as a result, Paramount made the decision to transform Phase II into Star Trek: The Motion Picture. Despite this failure, Diller would eventually launch a successful fourth network, when in late 1986, he joined the Rupert Murdoch-owned News Corporation to create the Fox network, which went on to be one of the most successful networks in the country.

In the 1980s, Paramount became increasingly involved with original syndicated programming in the U.S., with such successful series being Entertainment Tonight, Star Trek: The Next Generation, Friday the 13th: The Series and The Arsenio Hall Show, all of which were among the most popular syndicated series broadcast during that decade; with the continuing success of the Star Trek franchise (notably, Star Trek: Deep Space Nine) and the purchase of television station owner TVX Broadcast Group (which owned independent stations in several large and mid-sized markets), the groundwork for a new network venture was laid.

On January 16, 1995, Paramount launched a new broadcast television network, the United Paramount Network (UPN), in a programming partnership with Chris-Craft Industries; Viacom (which acquired Paramount Pictures and its related holdings in 1994) would acquire 50% interest in the network in 1996 and acquire Chris-Craft's remaining stake in 2000. During its 11-year existence, UPN never made a profit; The New Yorker reported that the network had lost $800 million during its first five years of operation. UPN ceased operations in September 2006, when it merged with the WB Television Network to form The CW Television Network; The CW today is majority-owned by KTLA's current owners Nexstar Media Group, with the station serving as that network's West Coast flagship station. Today, Paramount's television division is part of the Skydance subsidiary CBS Studios.
