= Professional wrestling in the United States =

Professional wrestling in the United States, through the advent of television in the 1950s, and cable in the 1980s, began appearing in powerful media outlets, reaching never before seen numbers of viewers. It became an international phenomenon with the expansion of the World Wrestling Federation (WWF). Throughout the 1990s, professional wrestling achieved highs in both viewers and financial success during a time of fierce competition among competing promotions, such as WWF, World Championship Wrestling, and Extreme Championship Wrestling.

The nature of professional wrestling changed dramatically to better fit television, enhancing character traits and storylines. Television also helped many wrestlers break into mainstream media, becoming influential celebrities and icons of popular culture. In the United States, in the First Golden Age of professional wrestling in the 1940s–1960s, Gorgeous George gained mainstream popularity, followed in the Second Golden Age in the 1980s–early 1990s by Hulk Hogan, André the Giant, "Macho Man" Randy Savage, Ric Flair, "Rowdy" Roddy Piper, Ultimate Warrior, Sting, Dusty Rhodes, Bret "The Hitman" Hart, Shawn Michaels, and The Undertaker, and in the Third Golden Age of the mid-1990s–early 2000s by the likes of "Stone Cold" Steve Austin, The Rock, and Triple H. More recent stars formed following the mid-2000s include John Cena, Randy Orton, Rey Mysterio, Roman Reigns, and Cody Rhodes.

== 1860s–1940s: From competition to performance ==
=== Carnival days ===
Professional wrestling, in the sense of traveling performers paid for mass entertainment in staged matches, began in the post-Civil War period in the late 1860s and 1870s. During this time, wrestlers were often athletes with amateur wrestling experience who competed at traveling carnivals with carnies working as their promoters and bookers. Grand circuses included wrestling exhibitions, quickly enhancing them through colorful costumes and fictional biographies for entertainment, disregarding their competitive nature. Wrestling exhibits during the late 19th century were also shown across the United States in countless "athletic shows" (or "at shows"), where experienced wrestlers offered open challenges to the audience. It was at these shows, often done for high-stakes gambling purposes, that the nature of the sport changed through the competing interests of three groups of people: the impresarios, the carnies, and the barnstormers.

Impresarios were the managers who chose how a wrestler could gain fame and interest among the fans, creating personas and improvising matches to make them more interesting. Carnies, who traveled and wrestled at these events, used tricks to protect their money and reputations during competitions, devising little-known and often dangerous wrestling moves, called "hooks". Hooks are illegal in conventional amateur wrestling, but have high rates of success against even the most athletic and experienced of competitors, essentially removing rules from professional wrestling. In addition, some spectators capable of beating the carnies roamed the country to compete in open challenges, setting side bets to make money. The barnstormers competed as traveling wrestlers did and often cooperated with the carnies to stage the matches, providing enormous profits for both sides in betting. Through the interest in money-making among the three groups, wrestling became a business-oriented entertainment venue, distinguishing itself further and further from its authentic amateur wrestling background.

Wrestling performers were arranged in a pyramid hierarchy of fame and money, based strictly on athletic talent. The lowest were the journeymen, young performers with promise and some skill, but who relied mainly on showmanship to gain fans. The actual wrestlers, called "shooters" because of their ability to "shoot", or fight real matches competitively, were more successful and less common. At the top were the elites, or the hookers, named for their ability to use arcane wrestling hooks to inflict damage and serious injury on the competition without much effort. Wrestlers considered themselves among a select group, and often kept the fact that their sport was commonly faked—to an extent—in high secrecy. They used a jargon of their own (often shared with carnies) to communicate so the audience would not understand them, including the word "kayfabe".

=== "Farmer" Burns and Frank Gotch era ===
During the late 19th century-early 20th century, wrestling was dominated by Martin "Farmer" Burns and his pupil, Frank Gotch. Burns was renowned as a competitive wrestler, who, despite never weighing more than 160 pounds during his wrestling career, fought over 6,000 wrestlers (at a time when most were competitive contests) and lost fewer than 10 of them. He also gained a reputation for training some of the best wrestlers of the era, including Gotch, known as one of America's first sports superstars.

Gotch, regarded as "peerless" at his peak, was the first to actually claim the world's undisputed heavyweight championship by beating all contenders in North America and Europe. He became the world's champion by beating European wrestling champion Georg Hackenschmidt, both in 1908 and 1911, seen by modern wrestling historians as two of the most significant matches in wrestling history.

The popularity of wrestling during the early 20th century was highest in the Midwest, where ethnic European communities, many of them German, Polish, Czech, Hungarian, Greek, and Scandinavian in ancestry, continued to carry on fighting styles practiced in their home nations. At this time, during the late 19th century, and early 20th century, the majority of wrestling was still competitive, and it was immensely popular. In fact, wrestling's popularity was second only to baseball from 1900 to the early 1920s, launching trading cards and competitive wrestling programs in colleges, high schools, and athletic clubs, legacies that have endured to the present day.

Wrestling's popularity experienced a dramatic tailspin in 1915 to 1920, becoming distanced from the American public because of widespread doubt of its legitimacy and status as a competitive sport. Wrestlers during the time recount it as largely faked by the 1880s. It also waned due to Gotch's retirement in 1913, and no new wrestling superstar emerging to captivate the audience's attention.

=== 1920–1948: Expansion ===
Following the retirement of Frank Gotch, professional wrestling—except in the Midwest where legitimate wrestlers such as Michigan's "Poison Ivy" took on all comers at State Fairs—was losing popularity fast. Media attention focused on the illegitimacy of wrestling instead of its athleticism, and without a superstar like Gotch, no major personality reached a wide fanbase. In response, three professional wrestlers, Ed Lewis, Billy Sandow, and Toots Mondt, joined to form their own promotion in the 1920s, modifying their in-ring product to attract fans. The three were referred to as the "Gold Dust Trio" due to their financial success. Their promotion was the first to use time-limit matches, "flashy" new holds, and signature maneuvers. They also popularized tag team wrestling, introducing new tactics such as distracting the referee, to make the matches more exciting.

The Trio's lasting legacy, and perhaps their greatest innovation within professional wrestling, was the use of a regular group of wrestlers for a packaged show. Rather than paying traveling wrestlers to perform on certain dates and combining wrestlers in match-ups when they were available, they decided to keep wrestlers for months and years at a time, allowing long-term angles and feuds to develop. This was the key to their success; they were able to keep wrestlers from their competition, and were able to have regular wrestling cards. Their business succeeded quickly, gaining popularity for its freshness and unique approach to wrestling; a traveling stable of wrestlers. The Trio gained great popularity nationwide during their best years, roughly 1920 to 1925, when they performed in the Eastern territory, acquiring fans from the highly exposed big cities.

The Trio was dealt a severe blow by Stanislaus Zbyszko, when he beat the rookie Wayne Munn for their world heavyweight championship, against the original booking. Munn, who had been recruited to wrestling and pushed to the level of champion in only a few months, was the Trio's new star and main attraction. Zbyszko was supposed to lose to Munn, but refused to follow along, beating Munn so decisively and thoroughly that the referee awarded him the title to prevent a riot. In addition, Zbyszko quickly dropped the title to Joe Stecher, a rival of Ed Lewis, making the situation worse for the Trio.

Stecher, although an able booker, was afraid of losing his championship, refusing to wrestle many contenders as a result. This made it impossible for the Trio to retrieve it. They responded by calling the Munn-Zbyszko match illegitimate, and reinstated Munn as champion, but quickly had him drop it to Lewis. This left two champions, Ed Lewis and Joe Stecher, who were regarded as the dominant wrestlers of the period. Stecher and Lewis agreed to a unification match years later, in 1928, when Stecher gave in and lost the title to Lewis. By this time, the Zbyszko double-cross had already caused irreparable damage, detracting from the Trio's dominance over the wrestling industry. In addition, the build-up of Munn followed by such a humiliating loss had devalued his title and credibility as a major wrestling superstar permanently.

=== Growth of wrestling promotions ===
In March 1887, Evan Lewis defeated Joe Acton for the American Catch-as-Catch-Can championship in Chicago. Soon, every wrestling promotion had created its own championship, which was considered each company's pride and glory. As promotions were attempting to become nationally renowned, acquiring rival championships marked victory.

In the 1930s and 1940s, small wrestling promotions had fierce competition with each other, often stealing talents and "invading" enemy companies to win over fans. With inter-promotional matches occurring nationwide, the promotions were vying for dominance.

== 1948–1984: Territory era, rise of television ==
In 1948, wrestling reached new heights after a loose confederation was formed between independent wrestling companies. This was known as the National Wrestling Alliance (NWA). In the late 1940s to 1950s, the NWA chose Lou Thesz to unify the various world championships into a single "World Heavyweight" title. Thesz's task was not easy, as some promoters, reluctant to lose face, went so far as to shoot title matches to keep their own champions popular with the fans.

The first pro wrestling studio television show was taped on December 18, 1942, at WRBG-TV in Schenectady, New York, at a time when few Americans owned television sets. The earliest successful recurring wrestling program was Hollywood Wrestling in Los Angeles, which debuted on KTLA in 1947 and was syndicated in numerous U.S. cities by 1952.

From the advent of television, professional wrestling matches began to be aired during the 1950s, both locally and nationally, reaching a larger fanbase than ever before. This was a time of enormous growth for professional wrestling, as rising demand and national expansion made it a much more popular and lucrative form of entertainment than in decades previous. This was called a "Golden Age" for the wrestling industry. It was also a time of great change in both the character and professionalism of wrestlers as a result of the appeal of television. Wrestling fit naturally with television because it was easy to understand, had drama, comedy and colorful characters, and was inexpensive for production. From 1948 to 1955, each of the three major television networks broadcast wrestling shows; the largest supporter being the DuMont Television Network.

=== Gimmick characters ===
Gorgeous George became one of the biggest stars during this period, gaining media attention for his outrageous character, which was described as flamboyant and charismatic. Already popular among wrestling fans, he became renowned after comedian Bob Hope noticed his performance in the Hollywood Legion Stadium in 1945 and 1946, and began to use him for jokes on his radio station. The publicity brought many people into wrestling events, bringing his stardom to a high point where promoters and television stations alike were paying generously for his performances.

Gorgeous George's impact on wrestling has been interpreted in many ways, demonstrating how fast television changed the product from athletics to performance. His legacy was the enormous change in wrestling personas he inspired. Before him, wrestlers imitated "ethnic terrors" (Nazis, Arabs, etc.), but his success birthed a more individualistic and narcissistic form of character. He was also among the first to use entrance music.

Television changed the on-screen product in many other ways as well. Originally, the impact of television was not well planned for during this period. Promotional spots, which are now used as pre-match rants by wrestlers to warm up the crowds, were often used for simple greetings and welcomes to the local crowds, missing in-ring personality boosts and character skits during this period. No one would discuss promos before shooting them, and promoters usually would not spend time helping wrestlers in front of the camera.

=== Competitiveness compromised ===
Professional wrestlers themselves began to change. As popularity grew during the mid-1950s, many more wrestlers joined the ranks of the business, and the number of professional wrestlers grew to over 2,000, far more than ever before. Many new wrestlers began fresh without notions of athletic sportsmanship that was popular in competitive arenas, however; they began with dreams of becoming televised superstars. This proved especially true as the product began to lose athletic talent, relying on blood and acrobatic performance.

Wrestling's competitiveness was degraded by television, a fact regarded by many in the business as a natural effect of television over competition. The New York wrestling office (an early precursor that would eventually evolve into what is now WWE) soon became dominant. It refused to use competitive wrestlers, and instead focused on attracting televised entertainment. Perhaps the first of the more comic book-like characters known to professional wrestling today was Antonino Rocca. Comparatively weak in wrestling ability, his marketable personality and barefoot acrobatics attracted fans and made him a national superstar, especially popular among Italian and Hispanic fans. The New York Wrestling office used him to revive the promotion on television, and found him far easier to exploit than a more athletically skilled wrestler, enabling the office to negotiate wrestler contracts tremendously in its favor.

=== Moderate slowdown ===
By the late 1950s, professional wrestling had lost its high ratings, and producers, realizing that they had overexposed it, soon dropped most wrestling shows from their lineups. The remaining televised wrestling promoters had small, local syndicated shows, which network producers placed as late-night and Saturday and/or Sunday morning/afternoon fillers rather than signature programming. Promoters used localized television as a weapon for eliminating the competition by purchasing airtime from rival territories, effectively putting them out of business.

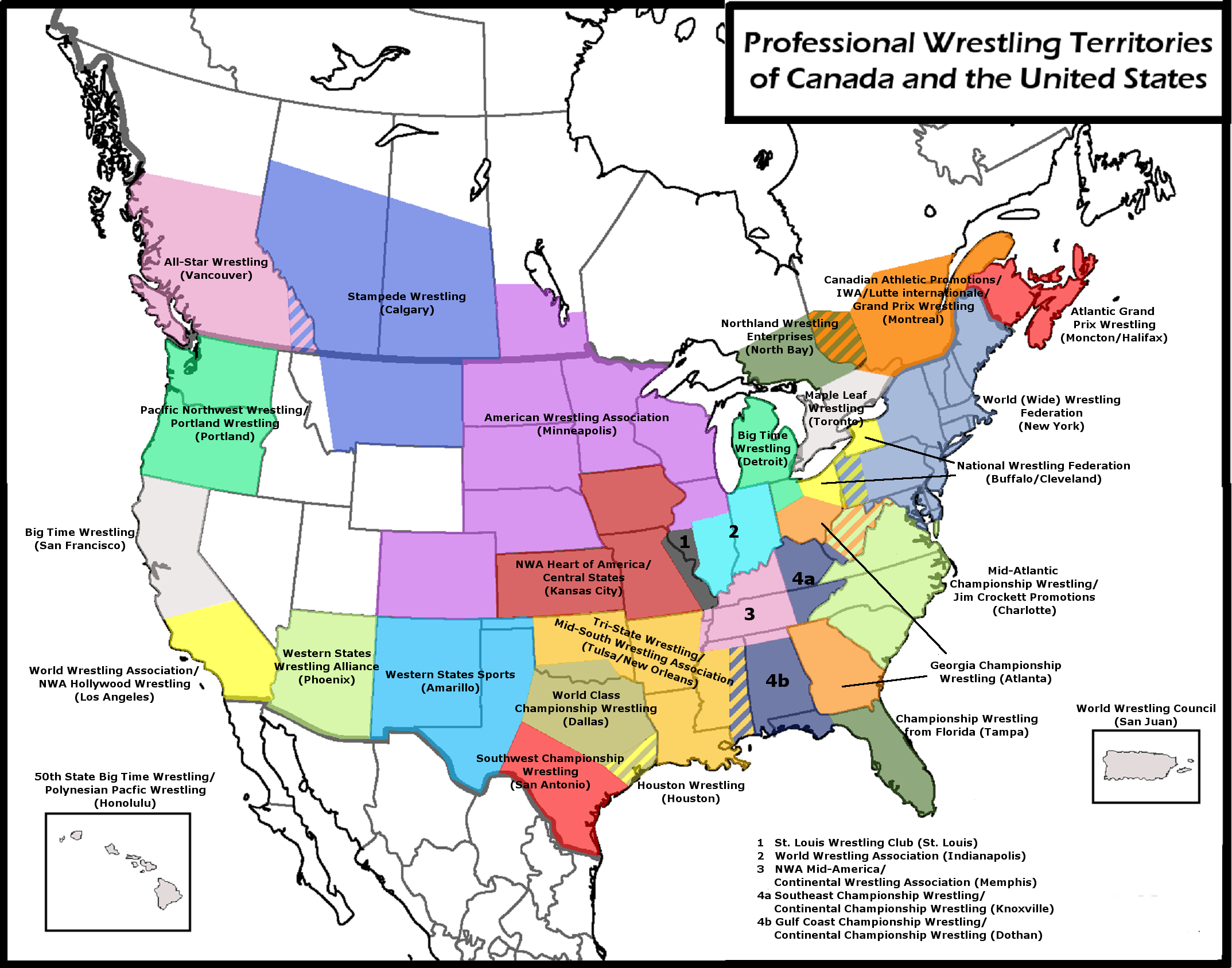
The NWA territory system in North America

The NWA was the most dominant wrestling body in the 1950s, and a large number of wrestling promotions had been under its leadership. Many promoters, however, viewed it as a crooked tyrant, holding back innovative changes in the sport. It was during this time that several promoters found reason to leave the organization, managing to find niches in the United States. The most prominent of these were the American Wrestling Association (AWA), which became the most popular wrestling promotion during the 1960s, and the New York-based World Wide Wrestling Federation (WWWF), renamed WWF in 1979.

As a top wrestler in the 1950s, Verne Gagne formed his own promotion in the NWA in 1957, which soon became the lead promotion with Gagne winning the World Heavyweight Championship of Omaha. After unsuccessfully lobbying for a title match with the NWA Champion, however, Gagne broke away from the NWA in 1960, renaming his promotion the American Wrestling Association, and making it the dominant organization of the 1960s. Named the AWA World Heavyweight Champion soon after, Gagne was the top wrestler, and engaged in many feuds with heel wrestlers, most notably Nick Bockwinkel, and was the AWA's top draw until his retirement in 1981.

Bruno Sammartino carried the WWWF during the 1960s and 1970s. His brawling, power moves, and personal charisma helped him become the most popular American wrestler during this time period. During the period when MSG was the WWWF's primary arena, Sammartino headlined more Garden cards than any other wrestler (211), including 187 sellouts.

The AWA was no longer the top promotion after the WWWF rejoined the NWA. The AWA reached new heights, however, after powerhouse wrestler Hulk Hogan gained nationwide attention from starring in Rocky III, and became a solid fan favorite. Despite Hogan being the AWA's top draw, Gagne would not let him be champion, believing technical wrestlers, like Gagne and Nick Bockwinkel, should be the focus of a wrestling company. Since founding the AWA, Gagne had built the company off of technical wrestling. Hogan left in 1983, irreparably damaging the AWA.

In spite of all this, the NWA as a unit was still on top, and gained huge dominance through Georgia Championship Wrestling (GCW), becoming the first nationally broadcast wrestling program on cable television in 1979. It aired on the TBS network. By 1981, GCW became the most watched show on cable television.

== 1984–2001: Popularity explosion, breakdown of the territories ==
=== 1980s wrestling boom ===
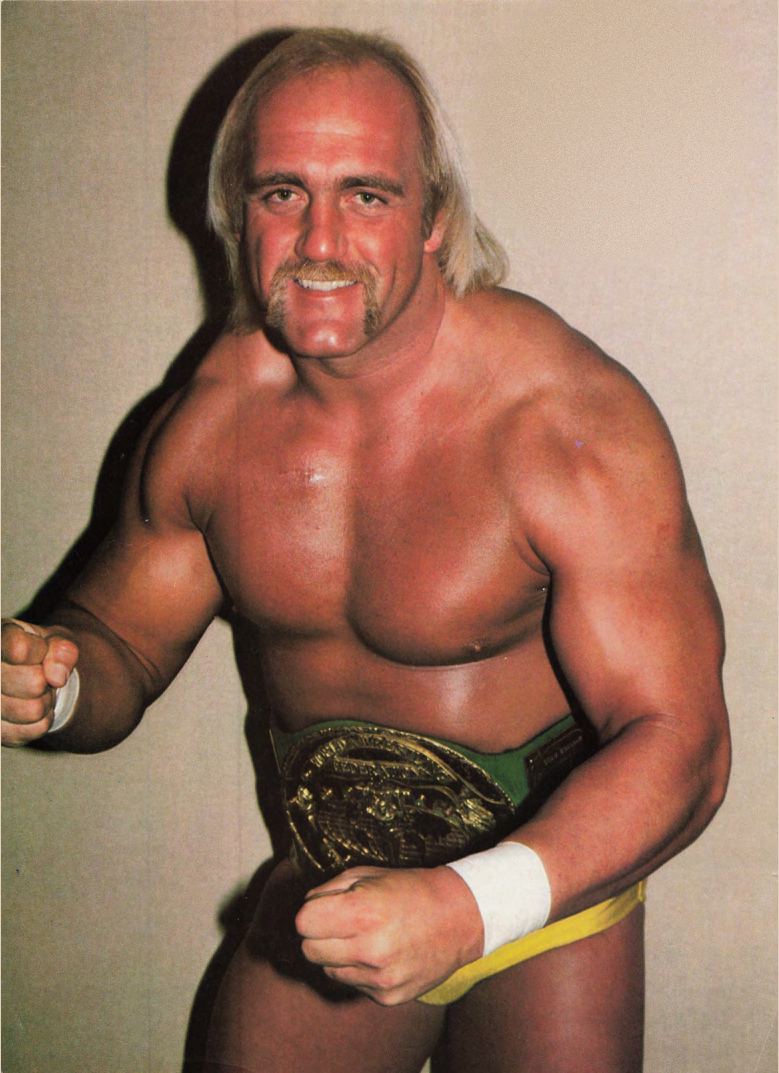
Hulk Hogan was the face of the World Wrestling Federation during the 1980s; itself the most prominent American wrestling promotion of the decade

The 1980s represented professional wrestling's greatest period of televised entertainment, reaching widespread popularity among American youth, as well as producing some of its most spectacular characters. In comparison to the declining support of media outlets during the 1960s and 1970s, professional wrestling, notably the emerging World Wrestling Federation (WWF; abridged from WWWF in 1979), received great exposure through its reappearance on network television. The WWF expanded nationally through the acquisition of talent from competing promotions and, because it was the only company to air televised wrestling nationally, became synonymous with the industry, monopolizing the industry and the fanbase. The WWF's owner Vince McMahon revolutionized the sport by coining the term "sports entertainment" to describe his on-screen product, admitting to its fakery as well as enhancing its appeal to children.

The WWF became the most colorful and well-known wrestling brand to children because of its child-oriented characters, soap opera dramaticism and cartoon-like personas. Most notable was the muscular Hulk Hogan, who marked the 1980s with his "all-American" persona. His sheer size, colorful attire, charisma and extravagance made his main events into excellent ratings draws. By January 1984, Hogan's legions of fans and his dominant role in the industry was termed "Hulkamania". Hogan sold-out arenas all across the United States and earned the WWF millions of dollars, making it the number one entity in all of professional wrestling; moments after Hogan defeated The Iron Sheik for the WWF World Heavyweight Title, Gorilla Monsoon famously proclaimed "Hulkamania is here."

Around this time, faces and heels became a generally more obvious and important part of wrestling. 'Gimmicks' were more popular, and it widely became a popular sport again. Wrestling was generally seen more as a form of fun and entertainment, however, than an official sport. It was more about building up face/heel feuds such as "Rowdy" Roddy Piper/Hulk Hogan and going into a big blow off match, which people loved. The WWF broke its way into mainstream entertainment and regularly brought in celebrities for events.

The "Rock 'n' Wrestling Connection" was a period of cooperation and cross-promotion between the WWF and elements of the music industry. The WWF attracting a degree of mainstream attention with Cyndi Lauper joining in 1984 and WWF personalities appeared in her music videos. Hogan gained mainstream popularity for appearing in the film Rocky III, reaching to an even greater level of celebrity. In 1985, Hulk Hogan's Rock 'n' Wrestling, an animated television series starring the character of Hogan, expanded Hogan's young fanbase.

Meanwhile, the NWA's renowned and highly successful territory system was slowly dying, with Jim Crockett Promotions (JCP) becoming the center of the entire NWA. While the WWF had their major stars at almost all of their shows, the NWA could only manage to have a few of its stars at one show at a time, so as to promote the product in every territory. After the WWF gained huge dominance with Wrestlemania, Crockett responded to the success of the WWF and successfully acquired time slots on TBS, and would continue to buy out NWA promotions between 1985 and 1987 as well. The advent of nationwide television also weakened the system. Wrestlers could no longer travel to a new market and establish a new persona, since fans there already knew who they were. Meanwhile, McMahon took advantage of this phenomenon by purchasing promotions all over the continent, in order to produce a widely popular nationwide television program and make the WWF the only viewing choice.

To counter the NWA's primary supercard, Starrcade, the WWF created its flagship show, WrestleMania, available on 135 closed-circuit networks. The show was a huge success with Hogan, who won in the main event, going on to appear on the cover of Sports Illustrated. After the swimsuit issue, it was the magazine's best seller, and following WrestleMania, four WWF programs were among the ten most watched shows on cable television. Professional wrestling began to become mainstream, thanks, in large part, to the appeal of Hulkamania among children. Large television networks also took wrestling into their weekly programming, including Saturday Night's Main Event, premiering on NBC in 1985, the first wrestling show to air prime time since 1955. ESPN also began airing professional wrestling for the first time, first airing Pro Wrestling USA shows—which were created as an alliance between the NWA and AWA in 1984, in an effort to counter the national success the WWF was gaining—and later AWA shows, after Pro Wrestling USA fell apart by 1986. The WWF also became an international success too.

WrestleMania III, with a reported record attendance of 93,173 people, is widely considered to be the pinnacle of the period. The episode of The Main Event I is the highest rated professional wrestling television show to date, with a 15.2 rating and 33 million viewers. Both had a main event featuring Hulk Hogan battling André the Giant for the WWF World Heavyweight Championship. Following WrestleMania III, the WWF added to its franchise and created both the Survivor Series, to counter-programming against Starrcade directly on PPV, and the Royal Rumble, to counter-programming against the Bunkhouse Stampede originally on the USA cable networks before transitioning to pay-per-view in subsequent years. The NWA responded by creating Clash of the Champions I on TBS to compete against WrestleMania IV.

Wrestling promotions across the United States feared being forced into bankruptcy by the WWF. They began to unify and conglomerate under more centralized leadership rather than continue independently. Competing promotions aired better talent and attempted to regain their audiences. In late 1987, Continental Wrestling Association wrestler and co-promoter Jerry Lawler had also joined the AWA, and helped establish a relationship between the AWA and CWA, which was formally an NWA territory, that would be somewhat of a revival of Pro Wrestling USA. In 1988, the struggling World Class Wrestling Association (formerly known as World Class Championship Wrestling until it withdrew from the NWA in 1986) and Continental Wrestling Federation (known as Continental Championship Wrestling until it was bought out in 1988) would also take part in this alliance, which agreed to unify the WCWA and AWA Heavyweight Titles at Superclash III. Superclash III was not a success, however, and the second Pro Wrestling USA alliance soon fell apart. CWA co-promoter Jerry Jarrett then bought out the WCWA and renamed the unified company as the United States Wrestling Association (USWA). Jerry Lawler also took his AWA Title to Jarrett's promotion, and the belt was renamed as the USWA Heavyweight Title. The AWA was able to create a new belt, but the end of 1990, company profits had dwindled so badly that the company went out of business. NWA President Bob Geigel also withdrew from the NWA by December 1987, and attempted to revive his Heart of America Sports Attractions as a national promotion known as World Wrestling Alliance, but would go out of business by 1989.

After WrestleMania III, Crockett also acquired the Universal Wrestling Federation—which broke from the NWA in 1986—and would also establish a second office in their old Dallas headquarters. To fight the WWF's control of the industry, JCP took the NWA's pay-per-view names and used its best talent to draw ratings. Crockett was unable to beat McMahon, who took big bites out of Jim Crockett Promotions by successfully airing the 1987 Survivor Series and 1988 Royal Rumble on the same nights as Starrcade 1987 and the 1988 Bunkhouse Stampede PPV cards. This left him with no viable option other than selling out to media mogul Ted Turner, who renamed the promotion World Championship Wrestling (WCW) and continued to challenge McMahon's monopoly of the industry. Turner promised a more athletic approach to the product, making Ric Flair the promotion's marquee wrestler and giving young stars big storylines and championship opportunities.

=== 1995–2001: Monday Night War ===
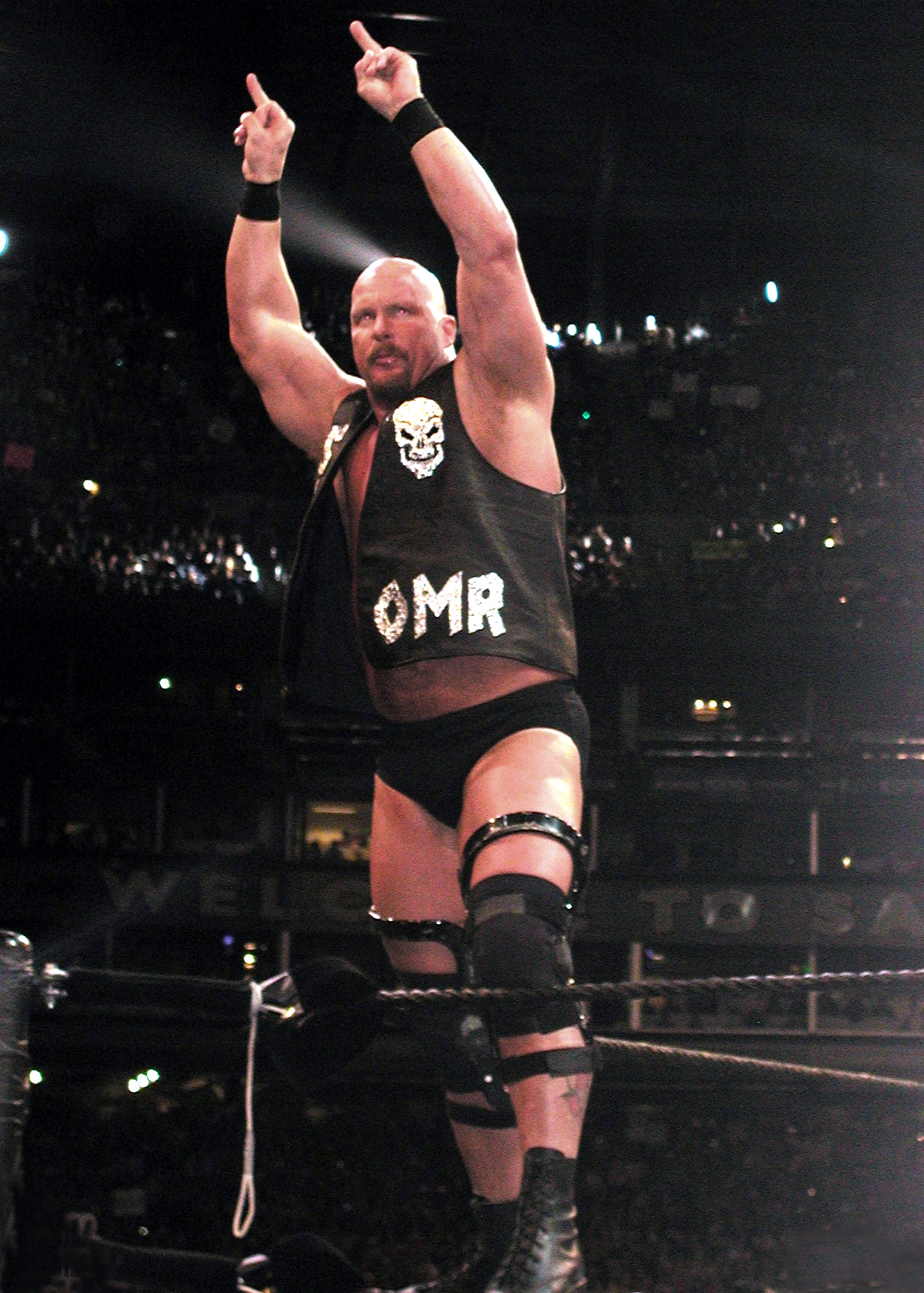
Stone Cold Steve Austin is often named the face of the Attitude Era, during this time in the Monday Night War the WWE changed programming to be more teen-oriented.

During the mid-1990s, the faltering WWF was being hindered by competing brands and nagging legal troubles. The largest troubles came from WCW, which competed for fans and dominated the industry during the years of 1996 to 1998. The WWF was forced to change itself to overcome its competition, remodeling itself with added bloodshed, violence, and more profane, sexually lewd characters. This new "Attitude Era" quickly dominated the style and nature of wrestling to become far more teen-oriented than ever before, and made the WWF regain its status as wrestling's top company.

The image of WCW changed when Eric Bischoff was appointed Executive Vice President of WCW in late 1993. He signed former WWF stars and departed from their focus on in-ring action in favor of the WWF's approach. The WWF began to suffer immediately and started building new stars. The Monday Night War began in 1995, when WCW started Monday Nitro, a show that ran directly against Monday Night Raw. While starting fairly even, the war escalated in 1996 with the formation of the heel stable, the New World Order. They helped WCW gain the upper hand when they became the most powerful group in professional wrestling. WCW also came up with more legitimate, edgy storylines and characters over the WWF's cartoon style.

While the WWF and WCW rivalry was brewing a third promotion was growing in prominence. NWA Eastern Championship Wrestling renamed itself "Extreme Championship Wrestling" (ECW) and left the NWA. ECW adapted a hardcore style of wrestling, and it exposed the audience to levels of violence rarely seen in wrestling. The unorthodox style of moves, controversial storylines, and intense bloodthirst of ECW made it immensely popular among many wrestling fans in the 18-to-25-year-old demographic. Its intense fanbase, albeit a small constituency, reached near-cultism in the late 1990s and inspired the "hardcore style" in other wrestling promotions, namely WWF and WCW.

In 1997, the WWF gained momentum with the start of the Attitude Era. McMahon recast himself as the evil boss, known authoritatively as "Mr. McMahon". While an interesting character, it was McMahon's realistic feud with Stone Cold Steve Austin who had proven to be a huge money making draw for the company and become the company's most popular wrestler at the time that made the company finally dominate its competition. This was probably among the best of McMahon's storylines, and it came at a time when Bischoff was losing his vigor in WCW's affairs. The WWF gained infamy for its more sexually explicit, profane, and violent characters. Austin was the top superstar in the company, portraying a foul mouthed beer swilling anti-hero who regularly defied his boss; The Rock became a star for his cocky persona, his many catchphrases and attractive charisma; Mankind gained popularity for enduring extreme pain, performing dangerous stunts renowned among the industry today; the stable D-Generation X was famous for its adult themes and established star, The Undertaker, added to his fame because of his hardcore matches most notably with Shawn Michaels and Mick Foley, his gimmick which many consider to be the greatest in the history of professional wrestling and because of his overall dominance in the period in which he helped to put over new talent like Kane and win three world championships in this era. Through the collective success of these characters, the company had finally refocused itself in the 18–25 demographic.

By the start of 1999, both shows were consistently getting ratings of 5.0 or higher, and over ten million people tuned in to Raw and Nitro every week. Wrestling continued to grow, as wrestlers made the mainstream media. From November 1998, the momentum was in the WWF's favor for the remainder of the War, with Raw dominating Nitro in the ratings. WCW continued its decline as their main eventers were in their 40s or pushing 40 and younger talent were never given the chance to be elevated to main event status. Their attempts at improving failed to turn the ratings tide, with Raw getting double the amount by 2000. ECW was by this point in dire financial straits and Heyman filed for bankruptcy on April 4, 2001. WCW continued to lose more money and finally folded on March 23, 2001, with McMahon buying out the promotion, after more than 15 years of business. This marked the end of the Monday Night War.

== 2001–present: Post-war consolidation ==
=== After the War ===
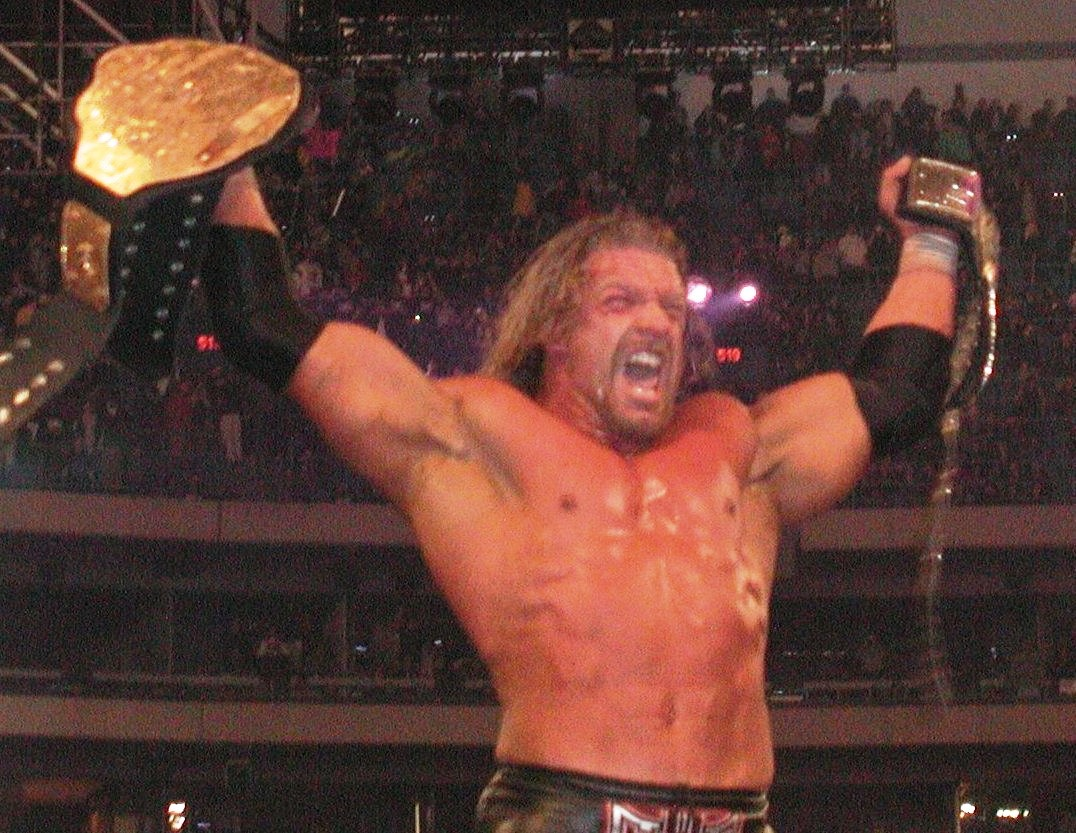
Triple H as the Undisputed WWF Champion, signifying the company's dominance in the industry

During 2001, the WWF aired the Invasion angle, which eventually saw the WCW World Heavyweight Championship as well as other WCW belts be contested in the WWF. Many top WCW stars such as Kevin Nash, Scott Hall and Hulk Hogan missed out on the invasion angle due to them having guaranteed contracts with WCW's parent company, AOL Time Warner. Top WCW talent like Ric Flair and the nWo never came back to the WWF until the invasion angle was over. Despite this, the invasion angle still saw the likes of Booker T and ECW's Rob Van Dam compete in the WWF, as well as ECW's original owner Paul Heyman jumping over to the WWF to become a commentator and on-screen personality. The WCW World Heavyweight Championship, known as the "World Championship" during its time in the WWF, was eventually unified with the WWF Championship when Chris Jericho defeated The Rock and Stone Cold Steve Austin in the same night at Vengeance.

With the closure of WCW and ECW, the WWF had become the dominant professional wrestling promotion in the United States. In 2002, WWF was renamed "World Wrestling Entertainment" (WWE) due to a trademark dispute with the World Wildlife Fund. That same year, the WWE divided its roster into two de facto wrestling promotions: Raw and SmackDown!, named after two of its television programs. The WWE bought back the Big Gold Belt, repackaged as the World Heavyweight Championship, which was initially used as the flagship title for Raw whilst the WWE Championship was initially the flagship title for Smackdown!. The two top stars of the Attitude Era, Stone Cold Steve Austin and The Rock, eventually left the company in 2003 and 2004 respectively. Former Senior Vice President of WCW, Eric Bischoff, was hired by the WWE as the general manager of Raw. During the mid-2000s, John Cena, Randy Orton, Batista, and Edge became the figureheads of the WWE along with the likes of pre-established superstars such as Triple H, The Undertaker and Shawn Michaels.

Not long after the closure of WCW and ECW, new promotions were founded in an attempt to cater to a niche market for the Southern-style, Lucha Libre, strong style, and hardcore wrestling styles that had been displaced by WWE. The most successful among these have been Total Nonstop Action (TNA) and Ring of Honor (ROH), both launching in 2002. Ring of Honor tried to emulate the Japanese strong style, while Impact presented themselves as an edgier, contemporary alternative to WWE. Other niches include erotic wrestling, as featured in promotions such as the Naked Women's Wrestling League where nude females performed mock combat matches for titillation, as well as the fan-created backyard wrestling. As fans sought out wrestling alternatives, independent promotions and developmental territories began to gain more exposure, including hardcore wrestling promotion Combat Zone Wrestling, and Pro Wrestling Guerrilla.

WWE held ECW One Night Stand, an ECW reunion pay-per-view event on June 12, 2005, with Raw and Smackdown! superstars taking on “ECW Originals”. On May 26, 2006, WWE officially announced the relaunch of ECW with its own show on NBC Universal's Sci Fi Channel, later to be known as Syfy, starting June 13, 2006. The brand would continue to operate until February 16, 2010, when the brand was rendered defunct. In place of ECW, NXT began airing on Syfy in 2010. NXT started as a reality-based television show before relaunching as a different brand in 2012, replacing Florida Championship Wrestling (FCW) as WWE's developmental territory. Wrestling critics and fans came to view NXT as its own distinct entity during this period, with the brand's shows being praised for their high-quality matches and offering a unique product to the main roster. NXT also became instrumental in the development of women's wrestling in WWE.

In 2014, United Artists Media Group and El Rey Network partnered to launch Lucha Underground, a serialized television drama and Lucha Libre promotion affiliated with Lucha Libre AAA Worldwide. Both the show and promotion would receive positive reviews and notable media attention. In 2018, Lucha Underground held a joint show with Impact Wrestling at WrestleCon during Wrestlemania weekend. Lucha Underground would ultimately be canceled in 2018 after four seasons.

In 2017, the National Wrestling Alliance was acquired by Billy Corgan, lead singer of the Smashing Pumpkins, including its name, rights, trademarks and championship belts. Since the acquisition, the NWA has seen a resurgence, buoyed by its web series, Ten Pounds of Gold. By 2019, the NWA would become a singular entity, rather than a governing body or inter-promotional alliance, with the introduction of its own weekly series, NWA Power, later that year.

=== The Forbidden Door ===
On September 1, 2018, All In, an independent event promoted by Cody Rhodes and The Young Bucks (then members of the NJPW stable Bullet Club), and featuring talent from Ring of Honor, Consejo Mundial de Lucha Libre (CMLL), New Japan Pro-Wrestling (NJPW), Impact Wrestling, Lucha Libre AAA, Major League Wrestling (MLW; a formally-defunct promotion that resumed holding events during the previous year), and the NWA was held. The event received notable media coverage for being the first non-WWE or World Championship Wrestling promoted professional wrestling event in the United States to sell 10,000 tickets since 1993. The show was promoted through storylines produced on webseries, such as The Young Bucks' Being The Elite, Ten Pounds of Gold, and Cody's Nightmare Family series ALL US - The All In Story.

Owing to the success and critical acclaim of All In, Cody and The Young Bucks would partner with Shahid and Tony Khan, the owners of the Jacksonville Jaguars and Fulham FC, to launch a new wrestling promotion called All Elite Wrestling (AEW) in 2019. The promotion quickly gained notoriety for its financial backing, which allowed them to secure a national weekly television deal for AEW Dynamite on TNT, and was seen by CBS Sports as the first national promotion to "compete with WWE on a major level in nearly two decades".

New Japan Pro Wrestling, which had formed their U.S-based subsidy named "New Japan Pro Wrestling of America" in 2019, and already established a working agreement with AEW, would re-establish a relationship with Impact in February 2021; leading to NJPW talents appearing at AEW and Impact events. Commentators and analysts would come to describe these events as the establishment of a greater territory system, a concept dubbed "The Forbidden Door". AEW president Tony Khan would dub himself "The Forbidden Door" during a paid segment for AEW Dynamite that aired on the February 9, 2021 episode of Impact!. All major U.S. promotions, except for WWE, engaged in partnerships throughout 2021. Impact talent would appear at NWA and ROH events, such as with the NWA's Mickie James being involved with a feud with Deonna Purrazzo, or former Impact president and current Anthem Sports advisor Dixie Carter making a cameo for the latter's Women's Division Wednesday web series on YouTube. During the April 20, 2022, episode of AEW Dynamite, AEW and NJPW established a joint pay-per-view event, AEW x NJPW: Forbidden Door. The inaugural event took place at the United Center in Chicago, Illinois, on June 26, 2022.

On October 27, 2021, Ring of Honor announced that it would go on a hiatus after Final Battle in December, later returning in April 2022. All personnel would also be released from their contracts as part of plans to "reimagine" the company as a "fan-focused product". In the aftermath, ROH World Champion Jonathan Gresham and ROH Women's World Championship Rok-C would continue to defend their titles at various events. Gresham, Rok-C, and several talent and staff signed with ROH at the time the promotion went on hiatus would make prominent appearances at Impact's Hard to Kill in January 2022. On the March 2 episode of All Elite Wrestling's live weekly series Dynamite, president and co-founder Tony Khan announced that he had purchased Ring of Honor from Sinclair Broadcast Group, including its brand assets, intellectual property, and video library. Khan also announced that he intends to make the ROH library available to the public in its entirety. It was clarified through a press release issued that night that the acquisition was made through an entity separate from AEW and wholly owned by Khan. In a media scrum following AEW's Revolution PPV on March 6, Khan revealed that he eventually planned to run ROH separately from AEW. On May 4, the sale of ROH to Tony Khan was officially completed. ROH matches began appearing on AEW programs, and Death Before Dishonor was the first ROH PPV under the new ownership.

On March 18, 2022, it was reported by multiple sources that founding Executive Vice President of AEW, Cody Rhodes, had re-signed with WWE. On the first night of WrestleMania 38 on April 2, Rhodes was revealed as Seth "Freakin" Rollins' surprise opponent, making his return to WWE after six years and defeating Rollins. Cody Rhodes would go on to achieve great success in the WWE, becoming Undisputed WWE Champion at WrestleMania XL in honor of his late father and WWE Hall of Famer Dusty Rhodes, and also becoming one of the most prominent names in the company. Multiple big names in both WWE and AEW have joined the opposing promotions, most notably CM Punk, who returned to WWE after a 9-year absence, Bryan Danielson (known as Daniel Bryan in WWE), Jon Moxley (known as Dean Ambrose in WWE) and Chris Jericho. On August 27 2023, AEW held All In at Wembley Stadium, a pay-per-view that received critical acclaim; with a live paid attendance number of 72,265, it became one of the highest attended events in professional wrestling history.

On April 3, 2023; WWE and Endeavor reached a deal under which WWE would merge with UFC's parent company Endeavor to form a new company, which would go public on the New York Stock Exchange (NYSE) under the symbol "TKO". Endeavor will hold a 51% stake in "TKO", with WWE's shareholders having a 49% stake, valuing WWE at $9.1 billion. This marked the first time that WWE has not been majority-controlled by the McMahon family. The merger between WWE and UFC into TKO Group Holdings (TKO) was completed on September 12, 2023. WWE thereafter operated as an autonomous professional wrestling subsidiary of TKO, though now organized as a limited liability company under the adjusted legal name "World Wrestling Entertainment, LLC". On January 23, 2024, Dwayne Johnson, also known as "The Rock" joined the TKO Group Holdings board of directors. Three days later on January 26, Vince McMahon resigned due to sexual misconduct allegations, with Ari Emanuel obtaining greater control as the new Chairman of TKO.

On April 1, 2024, Triple H stated that WWE had entered "another era". On April 3, WWE wrestler Cody Rhodes coined the term "Renaissance Era" for the period. At WrestleMania XL, the WWE would officially debut a new signature intro ahead of the event's first match. Paul "Triple H" Levesque would introduce the fans in attendance, “Welcome to a new time, welcome to a new era,” and at the WrestleMania's second night Stephanie McMahon would reiterate this, referring to it as the "Paul Levesque era”. On January 23, 2024, WWE announced that WWE Raw will move to Netflix streaming service in January 2025, with Premier Live Events (PLE's), SmackDown and NXT being available on Netflix in international markets outside of the U.S. On October 29, WWE announced the launch of their own independent wrestling development program named WWE ID, short for WWE Independent Development.

In 2024, WWE began a wider talent exchange with Total Nonstop Action Wrestling (TNA). Several TNA wrestlers would make appearances on NXT's weekly television series and livestreaming events and vice versa. A multi-year partnership between Total Nonstop Action Wrestling (TNA) and WWE was officially announced on January 16, 2025. WWE also formed partnerships with Pro Wrestling Noah and Dream Star Fighting Marigold.

== Controversies ==
=== WWE ===
==== Steroid investigation ====
The WWF was investigated by the Federal Government in 1991 for a steroid scandal where, reputedly, steroid use was rampant among wrestlers and in McMahon's World Bodybuilding Federation. Large names, including Hulk Hogan, gained infamy when news of their long-time steroid use was revealed. In addition, a civil lawsuit involving sexual misconduct on the part of Pat Patterson in 1992 further weakened the company. This gained great criticism to the WWF, weakening its once "family-oriented" programming.

==== Chris Benoit double murder-suicide ====
WWE gained national media coverage in 2007 for the Chris Benoit murder-suicide, hypothesized to be related to brain damage resulting from multiple concussions. This incident, along with the death of Eddie Guerrero in 2005, made drug use and young deaths in the business a subject of intense controversy. The wrestling industry and the nature of the business were widely criticized for this and WWE was affected on the business-side, with the company's stock losing approximately $15 million in market value in the first week. Ratings also suffered for a short period, with Raw dropping 10% in total viewers.

== See also ==
- History of World Championship Wrestling
- History of WWE
