= Has Anybody Seen My Gal? =

Has Anybody Seen My Gal? may refer to:

- "Has Anybody Seen My Gal?" (song), a popular song first recorded by The California Ramblers in 1925
- Has Anybody Seen My Gal? (film), a 1952 comedy starring Piper Laurie and Rock Hudson
