= Breakfast in Hollywood =

1941 radio show

for the 1946 film, see Breakfast in Hollywood (film).

Tom Breneman's Restaurant as it looked in 1947, It was located on Vine Street off Sunset Boulevard

Breakfast in Hollywood is a morning radio show created and hosted by Tom Breneman broadcast from 1941 to 1948 on three different radio networks: NBC, ABC and Mutual. These unscripted shows were spontaneous and involved much audience participation. Breneman's many guests included such stars as Jimmy Durante, Andy Devine and Orson Welles.

== History ==
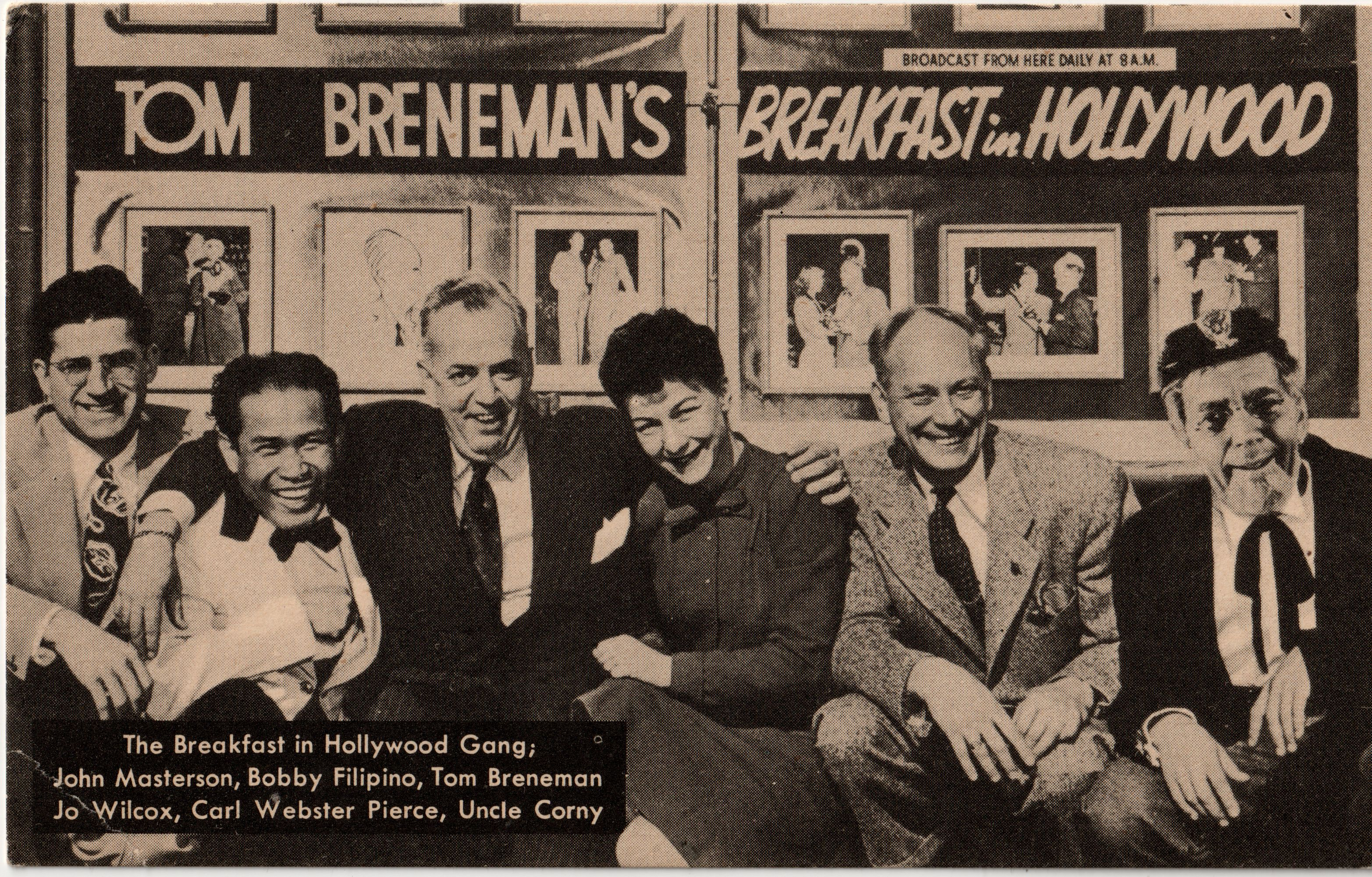
Promotional image of the cast of Tom Breneman's Breakfast in Hollywood

Radio personality Breneman was in Hollywood having lunch in 1940 with friends at Sardi's Restaurant on Hollywood Boulevard when he realized the location's potential for a radio program. He quickly found an audience when he began broadcasting his Breakfast on the Boulevard January 13, 1941, on KFWB Los Angeles. Newspaper radio schedules indicate that West Coast stations were broadcasting the program as "Breakfast at Sardi's" as early as September 1941. The program was limited to radio stations in California, Oregon, and Washington State until Breakfast at Sardi's aired on the NBC Blue Network from August 3, 1942. One source claims that on February 26, 1943 the title was changed to avoid confusion with Sardi's in New York.

However, newspaper radio schedules for the New York listening area began changing from "Breakfast at Sardi's" to "Breakfast in Hollywood" only in early 1945 while other newspapers referred to Breneman's program as "Breakfast at Sardi's" until mid-1945. The program had numerous sponsors, including Kellogg's cereals, Ivory Flakes, Planters Peanuts, Aunt Jemima Flour, Minute Man Soups and Alpine Coffee. By the mid-1940s, Breneman had ten million listeners. The popularity of the radio program was such that he created his own magazine, and in 1945 he opened his own establishment, Tom Breneman's Restaurant, located on Vine Street off Sunset Boulevard. Organist Korla Pandit was only one of the musical talents who performed at the restaurant.

== Film ==
In 1945, flush with success, Breneman promoted the production of a 90-minute feature film, Breakfast in Hollywood (1946) starring Breneman, Bonita Granville, Beulah Bondi, Raymond Walburn, ZaSu Pitts, Billie Burke and Hedda Hopper, featuring musical numbers by Spike Jones, the Nat King Cole Trio and Andy Russell. Songs include "It Is Better to Be Yourself" by Nat King Cole and "If I Had a Wishing Ring" by Marla Shelton and Louis Alter. "Magic is the Moonlight," "Amor", and "If I had a Wishing Ring" are sung by crooner Andy Russell. The film is available on DVD from Mill Creek Entertainment in the Classic Musicals 50 movie pack.

== Other ==
At the age of 47, Breneman died April 28, 1948, in Encino, California, and other hosts, including Garry Moore, stepped in as replacements, but without Breneman, the ratings dropped, and the program came to an end in January 1949.

== See also ==
- List of movies based on radio series

== Watch ==
- Breakfast in Hollywood is available for free viewing and download at the Internet Archive

== Listen to ==
- Zoot Radio, free Breakfast In Hollywood old time radio shows
