= Klaus Landsberg =

German-American pioneer television engineer (1916–1956)

- Born: July 7, 1916; Berlin, German Empire
- Died: September 16, 1956 (aged 40); Los Angeles, California, U.S.
- Occupation: German-American electrical engineer

Klaus Landsberg (July 7, 1916 – September 16, 1956) was a pioneering German-American electrical engineer who made history with early telecasts, and after emigrating to the United States helped pave the way for today's television networks.

He appeared in many plays during his childhood. In his early teens he combined his technical skill and expressed desire to pursue his strong artistic inclination, setting out to prove that the two could be successfully blended.

In 1936 he was called upon to assist in the history-making telecast of the Berlin Olympic Games.

In 1937 Klaus was appointed laboratory engineer and assistant to Dr. Arthur Korn, the inventor of picture telegraphy. During this association, Landsberg created many new electronic devices. The most outstanding of these achievements was the invention of an electronic aid to navigation and blind landings, considered so vital to the Third Reich that upon being patented it was declared a military secret, which Landsberg was determined to destroy as a Nazi weapon (he was successful). This basic radar principle later became Landsberg's passport to America.

Following his arrival in the United States, Farnsworth Television, Inc. hired Landsberg as Television Development Engineer in Philadelphia in 1938.

In 1939 he went to New York for the National Broadcasting Company television division. During this period, Landsberg helped NBC make the first public demonstrations of electronic television in America, at the April 30, 1939 opening of the New York World's Fair.

Allen B. DuMont recognized Landsberg's qualifications, and signed him as television design and development engineer for the New York-based DuMont Laboratories, a pioneer United States television organization. There he supervised technical operations of the television unit at the U.S. Army Maneuvers in Canton, New York, developing automatic synchronizing circuits. In 1939 he was contracted to build DuMont's station WABD, as well as produce the station's first shows.

In 1941 Klaus was sent by Paramount Pictures to Los Angeles to build W6XYZ, an experimental television station. He ran the experimental station from 1942 to 1947, during which time he produced Paramount's first kinescope. Also in 1947, KTLA (Channel 5), a Los Angeles Television station funded by Paramount and helmed by Klaus Landsberg, began regular commercial broadcasts, with the first such KTLA commercial broadcast was January 22, 1947, hosted by Bob Hope.

By 1948, KTLA boasted a show lineup that included Spade Cooley, The Ina Ray Hutton Show, The Continental Lover, Time for Beany, Korla Pandit's Adventures in Music and Hollywood Wrestling.

Landsberg died of cancer in 1956 in Los Angeles.
