= Diane Brewster =

American actress (1931–1991)

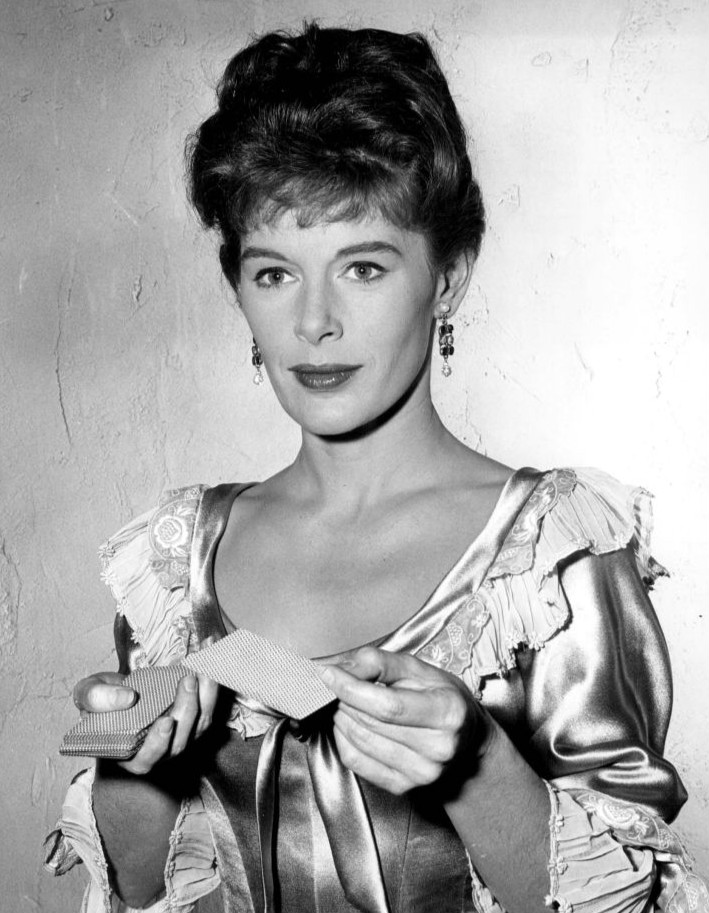
- Brewster in 1963
- Born: March 11, 1931; Kansas City, Missouri, U.S.
- Died: November 12, 1991 (aged 60); Studio City, California, U.S.
- Education: Shawnee Mission High School
- Years active: 1952–1986
- Known for: Leave It to Beaver; Maverick
- Spouse: Jabe Z. Walker (m. 1959)
- Children: 2

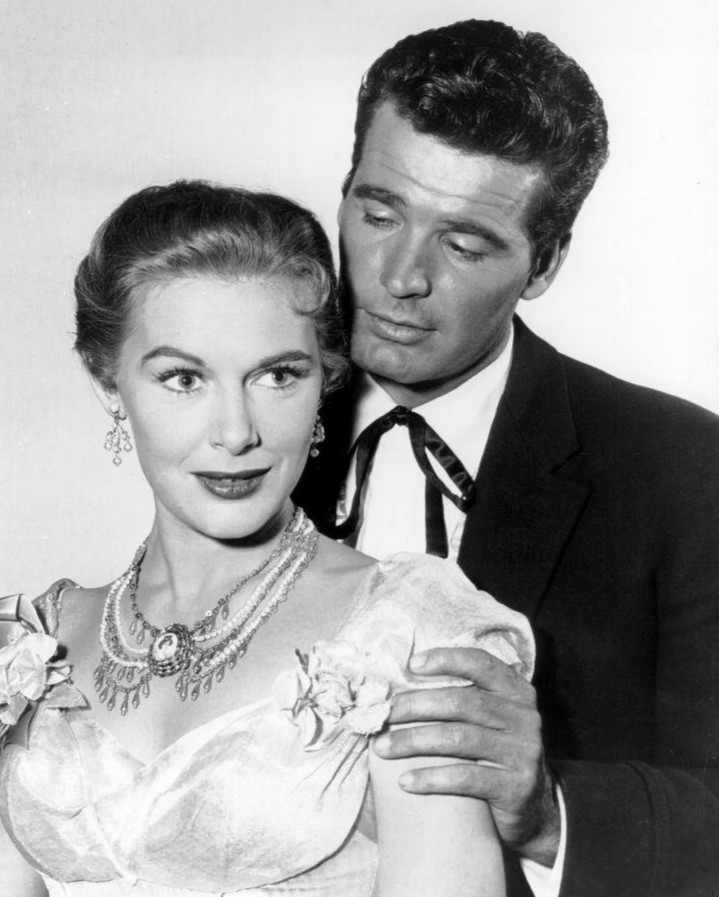
With James Garner in Maverick (1957)

Diane Brewster (March 11, 1931 – November 12, 1991) was an American television actress most noted for playing three distinctively different roles in television series of the 1950s and 1960s: confidence trickster Samantha Crawford in the Western Maverick with James Garner; pretty young second-grade teacher Miss Canfield in Leave It to Beaver; and doomed wife Helen Kimble in The Fugitive. Brewster was a direct descendant of William Brewster, a Pilgrim and Governor of the Plymouth Colony.

== Early years ==
Brewster's father was Phillip Sloan Brewster, a trial lawyer in Missouri; her mother was Geraldine (née Craddock); she had an older brother, Paul. She was born in Kansas City, Missouri and went to Shawnee Mission High School. Her 1949 senior class yearbook lists a nickname, "Dissy". She was a Pep Club member, Class Secretary, Cheerleader and Homecoming Queen Attendant. Later, Brewster studied liberal arts at the University of Kansas. Following her sophomore year at the university, she took a job as a secretary at a radio station.

== Career ==
Brewster moved to Los Angeles from the Kansas City area around 1955. Her first job in entertainment was as MC for a teenage radio program. Work in commercials, fashion commentary, and even weather programs soon followed. In 1956, Brewster was the announcer on The Ina Ray Hutton Show, a variety program on NBC television.

On Maverick, Brewster's character is a gorgeous gambling con artist who often affects a southern accent to convince marks of her reliability, but is ultimately likable. Brewster first played the character in a 1956 episode of Cheyenne entitled "Dark Rider" before appearing opposite James Garner in the third episode of Maverick, "According to Hoyle". Her other Maverick appearances include "The Savage Hills" with Jack Kelly, "The Seventh Hand" with Garner, and the famous "Shady Deal at Sunny Acres" featuring both Kelly and Garner. According to his detailed interview for the Archive of American Television, writer/producer and series creator Roy Huggins had given her character his mother's maiden name.

She played Marilyn Hesselroth in the Bachelor Father episode, “Bentley and the Girl Scouts”, which aired September 29, 1957.

Brewster played Miss Canfield on Leave It to Beaver for the first season on CBS, 1957-1958, and for the 1980s television revivals. Brewster appeared in the show's pilot, "It's a Small World", as Miss Simms, a secretary with a dairy company, and in four regular season episodes as Miss Canfield. In Episode 1, she appears in the credits as "Diana Brewster", a mistake which was corrected in her next appearance in Episode 8. Brewster was replaced by Sue Randall as "Miss Landers" on the second season of Leave It to Beaver.

In 1957, she co-starred with George Montgomery in the Western film Black Patch, playing his former and future love interest. On January 31, 1959, Brewster played Lisa Caldwell in the episode "Runaway Train" of NBC's Cimarron City Western television series starring George Montgomery. That same year, Brewster appeared in The Young Philadelphians playing the mother of Paul Newman's character. (Newman was six years her senior.)

She made almost 50 appearances in various other television and film roles, including episodes of Crusader starring Brian Keith, Wanted: Dead or Alive with Steve McQueen, Tombstone Territory (as "Julie Dixon" in season 1 episode 33), Tales of Wells Fargo (as "Dr Alice" S2/E25) with Dale Robertson, and Harbor Command with Wendell Corey. In 1959, she played the girlfriend of Ronald Reagan's character in an installment of the General Electric Theatre anthology series, "Nobody's Child", and portrayed Marian Dell in the episode "Law of the Badlands" of the syndicated series Frontier Doctor starring Rex Allen.

In 1960, Brewster had a starring role as Wilhelmina "Steamboat Willy" Vanderveer in The Islanders, an hour-long adventure series set in the South Pacific, with William Reynolds and James Philbrook. That same year, she also portrayed the titular role in "The Lita Foladaire Story," an episode of Wagon Train with Ward Bond and silent film star Evelyn Brent, in which Brewster's character had been killed before the start of the show, with her sections of the story posthumously depicted in flashbacks. Brewster was also a guest star in 1965 on Wagon Train, appearing in "The Echo Pass Story" along with Jack Lord and James Caan, which aired on January 3, 1964.

Brewster subsequently guest starred on Empire and in The Rifleman episode, "The Jealous Man" in 1962; on The Dakotas with Jack Elam in 1963; on the 1963 Perry Mason episode, "The Case of the Potted Planter" with Raymond Burr, and in the premiere episode of Kentucky Jones (1964) with Dennis Weaver and Harry Morgan.

Brewster appeared several times in flashbacks as the murdered wife Helen Kimble in The Fugitive, most prominently in episode 14 of season 1, "The Girl from Little Egypt", broadcast December 24, 1963. She appeared in two episodes of Death Valley Days, in a 1967 episode of Family Affair, and in an installment of Ironside (1968) before retiring. She reappeared in four episodes of The New Leave It to Beaver.

== Personal life and death ==
In California, Brewster married Jabe Z. Walker, an oral surgeon from Allegheny County, Pennsylvania. They had a son, Dean C. Walker, and a daughter, Lynn D. Walker. Both children were born in Los Angeles. Jabe Walker died in February 2013.

Brewster died from heart failure in 1991, aged 60.

== Filmography ==
Year	Title	Role	Notes
1955	Alfred Hitchcock Presents	Secretary	Season 1 Episode 10: "The Case of Mr. Pelham"
1955	Lucy Gallant	Salesgirl	Uncredited
1955	Sincerely Yours	Girl at Carnegie Hall	(scenes deleted)
1957	Pharaoh's Curse	Sylvia Quentin	
1957	The Oklahoman	Eliza	Uncredited
1957	Courage of Black Beauty	Ann Rowden	
1957	Black Patch	Helen Danner	
1957	The Invisible Boy	Mary Merrinoe	
1958	Decision	Ann Conway	Episode "Man on a Raft"
1958	Quantrill's Raiders	Sue	
1958	The Restless Gun	Helen Bricker	Episode "The Whip"
1958	Torpedo Run	Jane Doyle	
1959	The Man in the Net	Vickie Carey	
1959	King of the Wild Stallions	Martha Morse	
1959	The Young Philadelphians	Kate Judson Lawrence	
1963	Perry Mason	Andrea Walden	”The Case of the Potted Planter”
1967	Family Affair	Frederika "Freddie" Parkhurst	Season 2, Episode 11: "Freddie"
