= Korla Pandit =

American musician (1921–1998)

Background information
- Also known as: Juan Rolando
- Born: John Roland Redd; September 16, 1921; St. Louis, Missouri, U.S.
- Died: October 2, 1998 (aged 77) (Note: Most sources, including Social Security indexes, indicate that his date of death was Friday October 2, 1998, although some obituaries stated that he died on October 1.) Petaluma, California, U.S.
- Genres: Exotica
- Occupation: Musician
- Instruments: Piano and organ
- Years active: 1940–1998
- Label: Fantasy Records
- Website: http://www.korlapandit.com

Korla Pandit (born John Roland Redd; September 16, 1921 – October 2, 1998), was an American exotica musician, composer, pianist, and organist. Redd was an African-American man from Missouri who moved to California in the 1940s. After getting involved in show business, Redd became known as "Korla Pandit" and claimed to be a French-Indian musician from New Delhi, India. A pathbreaking musical performer in the early days of television, Redd is known for Korla Pandit's Adventures In Music; the show was the first all-music program on television. He also performed live and on radio and made various film appearances, becoming known as the "Godfather of Exotica". Both publicly and privately, Redd maintained the Korla Pandit persona and continued to pass as a native of India until the end of his life.

== Early life, marriage, and family ==
John Roland Redd was born in St. Louis on September 16, 1921. His father, Ernest Redd, was an African-American Baptist pastor. Redd's mother, Doshia O'Nina Johnson, had white and African ancestry. Both parents were descended from African-American slaves. Redd was one of seven children. He had light skin and straight hair. In 1922, Redd's family moved to Hannibal, Missouri, where they lived for nine years.

In 1931, the family moved to Columbia, Missouri, where Redd's father was a pastor of the Second Baptist Church. Given the Jim Crow restrictions in the state, Redd and his siblings attended Frederick Douglass High School, a racially segregated public school for African-American children.

The Redd family later described Redd as a musical prodigy from the age of three. He could hear a song once and have it memorized, and family members taught him to play piano at an early age. A contemporary of Redd's, jazz pianist Charles Thompson, knew Redd from Columbia; they attended high school together. Thompson has said that as a teenager, Redd was a better piano player than he was. The whole Redd family was musically talented; Redd's two sisters sang, and one played piano. His older brother, Ernest Redd Jr. (1913–1974) (known as "Speck" because of his freckles), became a jazz pianist and later a band leader in Des Moines, Iowa. John and Ernest Redd played in groups with their older brother Harry, who was also a musician.

In the early 1940s, Redd met his sister Frances's white friend and roommate, Beryl June DeBeeson, a Disney artist and former dancer. They fell in love and, in 1944, traveled to Mexico for a marriage ceremony in Tijuana, as interracial marriages were then illegal in California. Redd and his wife had two sons.

== Career as musician and entertainer ==
=== Hollywood and the creation of Korla Pandit ===
By the 1940s, Redd had moved from the Midwest to Los Angeles, where his sisters Ruth and Frances had lived since the late 1930s. Redd used the name "Juan Rolando" to gain a job playing the organ on the Los Angeles radio station KMPC. Passing as a Mexican allowed him to join the Musicians Union (which was not open to African-Americans) and opened up additional opportunities for studio and club work. Contemporaries who knew Redd before his move to Los Angeles were aware of his deception; a 1943 Columbia, Missouri newspaper article detailed how "Johnny Redd, Negro band leader and pianist" had been using the Juan Rolando name for two years to obtain bookings in Southern California. The article included a photo that showed Redd in an early version of his Korla Pandit costume.

Redd and his wife later created a new entertainment persona for him. They thought he could have exotic appeal by passing as an Indian because most Americans did not know much about people from India. Beryl designed the makeup and clothing, and Redd took the name "Korla Pandit". He developed an elaborate false history and continued to add to it during his career. He claimed that he had been born in New Delhi, India, to a French opera singer and an Indian Brahmin government official. Supposedly raised in an upper-class Indian household, Redd claimed to have studied music in England as a child, arrived in the United States at age 12, and studied at the University of Chicago. Redd used the Korla Pandit persona—in public and in private—for the rest of his life. His deception was so successful that when he began using the Indian backstory, California newspapers indicated that Korla Pandit was the real name of the musician who had been known as Juan Rolando.

In 1948, Redd created and played background music as Korla Pandit for the revival of radio's occult adventure series Chandu the Magician. He achieved an air of mystery on the Novachord and the Hammond CV electronic organ. In 1949, he became a regular organist on Hollywood Holiday, a show broadcast from a Los Angeles restaurant.

=== Television success ===
Korla Pandit performed at Tom Breneman's Restaurant, seen here as it looked in 1947. Breneman broadcast his Breakfast in Hollywood radio program from here in the late 1940s.

In 1948, while performing in Hollywood at a furrier's fashion show, Pandit and his wife Beryl met television pioneer Klaus Landsberg. He offered Pandit a television show with the stipulation the musician would also provide accompaniment for Time for Beany, Bob Clampett's popular puppet show. Korla Pandit's Adventures In Music was first telecast on Los Angeles station KTLA in February 1949. It was the first all-music program on television.

Landsberg insisted that Pandit refrain from speaking and gaze into the camera as he played the Hammond organ and Steinway grand piano, often simultaneously. In 900 television performances, he never spoke on camera.

Pandit became an overnight star and one of early television's pioneering musical artists. He widened the array of music associated with the organ and popularized its use. Never dropping his Indian persona, Pandit made notable friends such as actor Errol Flynn, comedian Bob Hope, and Sabu, known for his roles in the films Elephant Boy (1937) and Thief of Baghdad (1940).

In 1956, Pandit moved to San Francisco and performed on San Francisco's KGO-TV. He began speaking on his show, espousing a blend of spiritual ideas that entranced many of his fans. He became friends with Paramahansa Yogananda, Indian spiritual leader of the Self Realization Fellowship. Their relationship was close enough that Yogananda wrote an introduction to the liner notes for one of Pandit's records, and Pandit played at Yogananda's funeral. The late 1950s was the time of the Beat Generation, which saw many Americans embrace spirituality and Eastern religions, while rejecting traditional values including the need to conform to society's norms and economic materialism. Pandit read widely and incorporated a variety of these topics in his talks, including mysticism and Zen philosophy. In 1967, Pandit and his family moved to Canada, settling in Vancouver, to prevent his sons from being drafted during the Vietnam War.

=== Later career ===
After moving to Canada, Pandit returned regularly to the San Francisco and Los Angeles areas for work. In the 1970s, as his television popularity waned, he supplemented his income with a variety of increased personal appearances and performances. He performed at supper clubs, supermarket openings, car agencies, music and department stores, pizza restaurants, lectures, music seminars, private lessons, and the theater organ circuit. He made a cameo appearance as himself in Tim Burton's biopic Ed Wood (1994), which drew renewed attention to him as a performer.

Pandit's career was revived in the 1990s, and he attracted a new generation, taking them under his wing. "The Tiki-lounge music revival gave Korla one last career resurgence and cult following. He recorded with The Muffs...." Pandit also performed a sold-out show at the legendary Bimbo's 365 Club in San Francisco.

== Death and revelations ==
Pandit died in Petaluma, California on October 2, 1998, two weeks past his 77th birthday. He was survived by his wife and their sons.

Some two years after Pandit's death, R.J. Smith, magazine editor of Los Angeles, published an article revealing Pandit's true ancestry.

During his life, Pandit kept in touch with his family of origin, but he wore his turban and did not bring his sons when visiting with them. According to Pandit's nephew, Ernest Redd, "Among the family we knew what he was doing and very little was said about it. There was times when he would come by, and it was kind of like a sneak visit. He might come at night sometime and be gone before we got up. He had to separate himself from the family to a certain extent. They would go to see him play, but they wouldn't speak to him. They would go to his show and then they would leave, and the family would greet him at a later time". Having met members of Pandit's extended family of origin, Stanford historian Allyson Hobbs wrote his family "felt he was very authentic and were very close to him". Pandit's sons heard rumors about their father's African-American background, but they rejected this information, insisting their father was the son of a New Delhi Brahmin. Shari died of cancer in December 2000, prior to the publication of Smith's exposé.

Intrigued by the Smith article, John Turner and Eric Christensen, retired TV producers who had each known Pandit in his later years, made a documentary titled Korla (2014). They wrote and produced the film together and Turner directed it. The duo interviewed an array of friends, fellow musicians, and family, discussing Pandit's life and achievements and exploring the complexities of racial identity. After Korla was widely released, various media outlets commented on Pandit's history, casting it as a classic American story of self-invention.

== Filmography ==
=== On screen ===
==== Acting ====
- Something to Live For (1952) – Hindu Man (uncredited)
- Which Way Is Up? (1977) – The Hindu
- Ed Wood (1994) – Indian musician

==== As himself ====
- Adventures in Music (television series) (1948)
- All Star Revue (television series) (1952)
- KTLA at 40: A Celebration of Los Angeles Television (television movie) (1986)
- Korla (documentary) (2015)

==== As musical performer ====
- Ed Wood (1994) (performer, writer and arranger of "Nautch Dance")

=== As composer ===
- Adventures in Music (television series) (1948)
- Time for Beany (television series) (1951) (episode #1.421)
