= Breakfast in Hollywood (film) =

1946 film by Harold D. Schuster

- Theatrical release poster
- Directed by: Harold D. Schuster
- Screenplay by: Earl Baldwin
- Produced by: Robert Golden
- Starring: Tom Breneman; Bonita Granville; Beulah Bondi; Edward Ryan; Raymond Walburn; Billie Burke; ZaSu Pitts; Hedda Hopper; Andy Russell; Spike Jones; Nat King Cole
- Cinematography: Russell Metty
- Music by: John Leipold; James Mayfield
- Production company: Golden Pictures
- Distributed by: United Artists
- Release date: February 26, 1946
- Running time: 90 minutes
- Country: United States
- Language: English

Breakfast in Hollywood, also known as The Mad Hatter, is a 1946 American comedy film directed by Harold D. Schuster and written by Earl Baldwin. The film stars Tom Breneman, Bonita Granville, Beulah Bondi, Edward Ryan, Raymond Walburn, Billie Burke, ZaSu Pitts, Hedda Hopper, Andy Russell, Spike Jones and Nat King Cole. The film was released on February 26, 1946, by United Artists.

== Plot ==
A woman comes to Hollywood to meet her fiancé, who does not show up. Given a ticket to a radio show, she meets a sailor who was a friend of her fiancé. The sailor falls in love with the girl, before he tells her that her fiancé had married someone else. The girl, angry with the boy's advances, leaves on a bus to return to her home in Minnesota. The radio program host plays a fairy godmother role, having the police arrest the girl, and reunite the couple, who decide to get married.

Spike Jones and His Orchestra perform one of their best-remembered numbers---"Cocktails For Two".

== Cast ==
- Tom Breneman as Tom Breneman
- Bonita Granville as Dorothy Larson
- Beulah Bondi as Mrs. Annie Reed
- Edward Ryan as Ken Smith
- Raymond Walburn as Richard Cartwright
- Billie Burke as Mrs. Frances Cartwright
- ZaSu Pitts as Elvira Spriggens
- Hedda Hopper as Hedda Hopper
- Andy Russell as Andy Russell
- Spike Jones as Spike Jones
- Nat King Cole as Nat King Cole
