= Tom Breneman =

American radio personality (1900–1948)

Tom Breneman's Restaurant is seen here as it looked in 1947. Breneman broadcast his Breakfast in Hollywood radio program from here in the late 1940s.

Thomas Breneman Smith (June 18, 1900 – April 28, 1948) was an American radio personality. For most of his career, he was based in Southern California, in Los Angeles and Hollywood. His radio program was such a success that he established the eponymous Tom Breneman's Restaurant in Hollywood, which attracted many actors, musicians and others.

== Early years ==
Breneman was born in Waynesboro, Pennsylvania. His father worked in a sand mine, and Breneman was one of six children. Breneman graduated from the public schools in Waynesboro and attended Columbia University.

== Radio ==
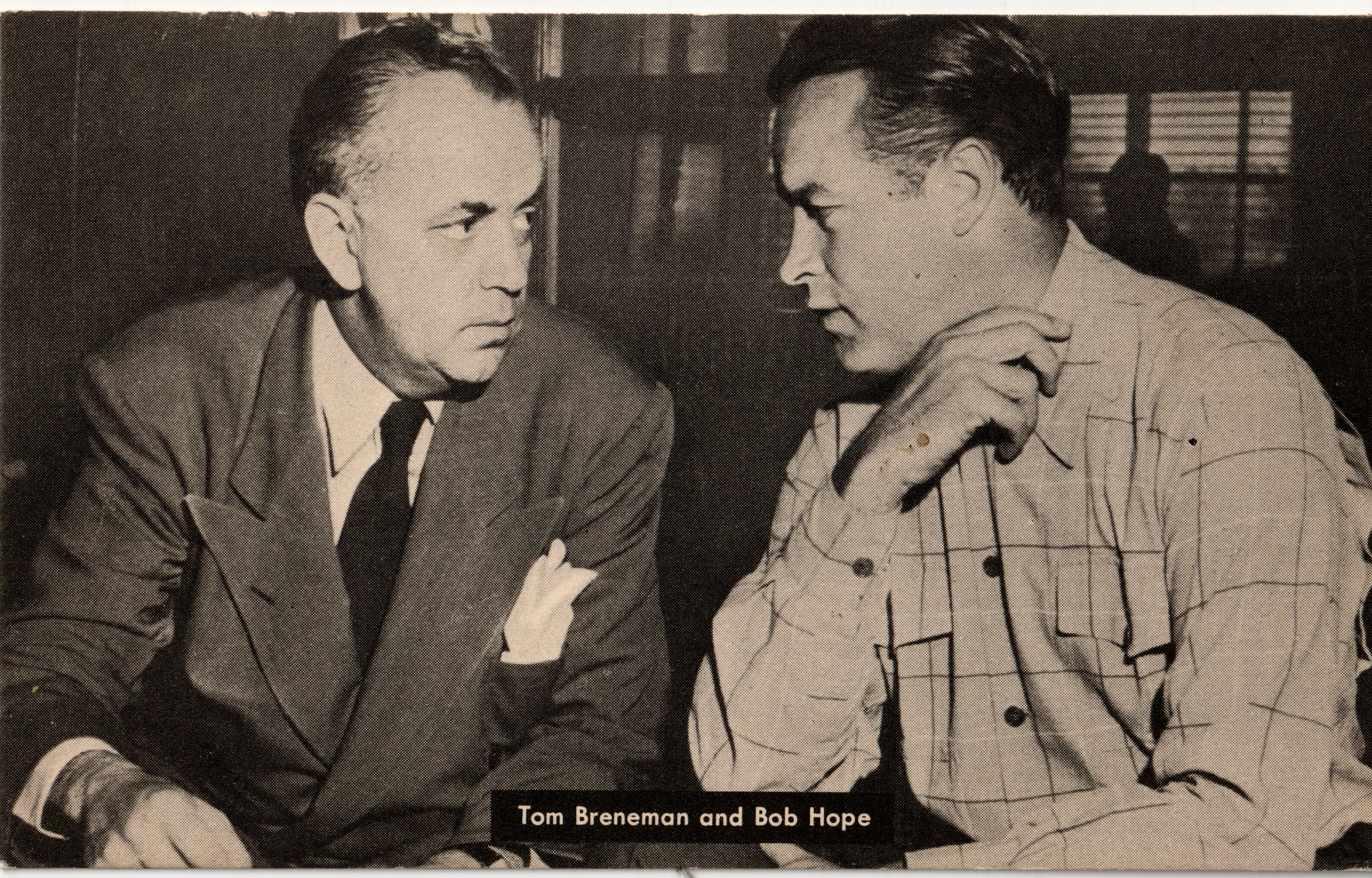
Tom Breneman and Bob Hope in 1945

Breneman began broadcasting in 1927. In 1930, he was program director at KFVD in Culver City, California. In 1931–32, appearing as Tom Brennie, he had a program, Laugh Club of the Air in New York City, an early audience participation show.

Returning to the West Coast, he hosted a morning variety show for Fels-Naptha soap from KFRC, San Francisco, to the CBS-Don Lee network circa 1935.

In 1937, Breneman was host of Secret Ambition, which was produced at KNX radio in Los Angeles, California, and was carried on CBS' newly formed Pacific Coast network.

Breneman was host of the show Breakfast in Hollywood (earlier titled Breakfast at Sardi's), which aired on the Blue Network, ABC, NBC and Mutual at various times from 1941 to 1948.

Breneman's program began using its best-known title Breakfast in Hollywood in 1945. By the mid-1940s, Breneman had ten million listeners. The popularity of the radio program was such that he developed spin-off enterprises in media and other areas. He founded his own magazine.

In 1945, he opened his own establishment, Tom Breneman's Restaurant, located on Vine Street off Sunset Boulevard. The opening on March 26, 1945, had "a gala crowd of Hollywoodites in attendance, including distinguished members of the radio industry, a number of famed screen and air personalities, and representatives of the press." He broadcast episodes of his program from his restaurant; entertainers included Korla Pandit, a purported Indian immigrant who was creating a sensation with a daily, all-music program on television and maintained this persona to his death in 1998, though an article in Los Angeles Magazine revealed that he was an African-American musician from Missouri, who had created a new persona and great success in Hollywood and on local TV.

== Family ==
Breneman married former actress Billie Dunn. They had two children, Gloria Anne, and Tom Jr.

== Death ==
Breneman died of a heart attack on April 28, 1948, in Encino, California. His funeral was held May 1, 1948, in Hollywood. He is interred at Forest Lawn Memorial Park (Glendale). Breneman was honored by being given a star on the Hollywood Walk of Fame.
