= Second Baptist Church (Columbia, Missouri) =

Historic church in Missouri, United States

- U.S. National Register of Historic Places
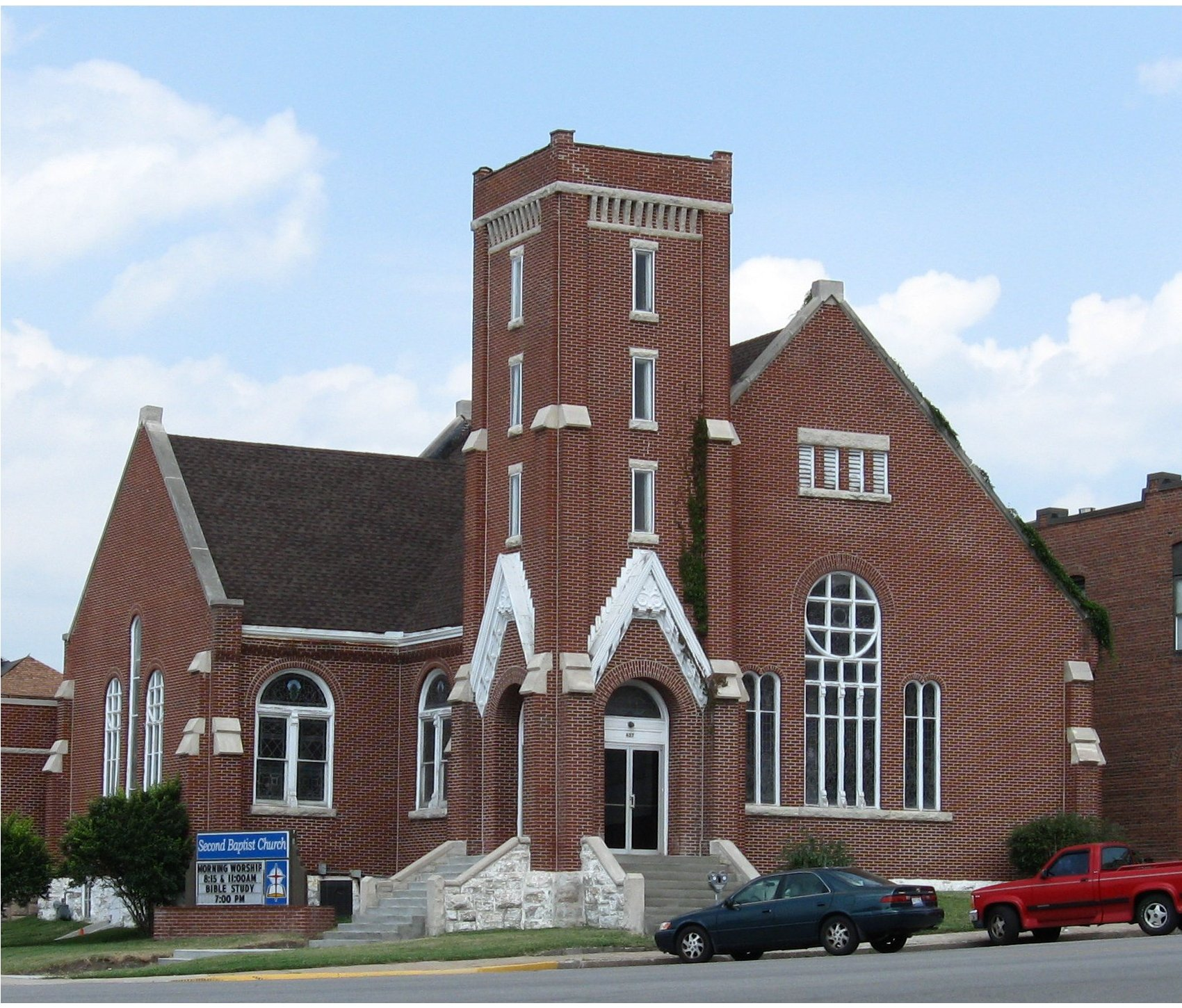

- Location within Missouri Location within the United States
- Location: 4th St. and Broadway, Columbia, Missouri
- Coordinates: 38°57′7″N 92°19′58″W
- Area: less than one acre
- Built: 1894
- Architectural style: Gothic, Romanesque
- MPS: Social Institutions of Columbia's Black Community TR
- NRHP reference No.: 80002313
- Added to NRHP: September 4, 1980

Second Baptist Church is a historic Baptist church located at 4th St. and Broadway in Columbia, Missouri. It was built in 1894, and has Gothic Revival and Romanesque Revival design elements. The church was founded by newly emancipated slaves many of whom were members of First Baptist Church.

It was added to the National Register of Historic Places in 1980.
