= Time for Beany =

1949 children's television series

- Characters from left to right: Beany, Captain Huffenpuff, Dishonest John, Hopalong Wong, Honey Bear, Cecil
- Created by: Bob Clampett
- Starring: Daws Butler; Stan Freberg
- Country of origin: United States

Production
- Producer: Bob Clampett
- Running time: 15 minutes
- Production company: Paramount Television

Original release
- Network: Paramount Television Network
- Release: February 28, 1949 – 1955

Related
- Beany and Cecil

Time for Beany is an American children's television series, with puppets for characters, which was broadcast locally in Los Angeles starting on February 28, 1949, and nationally (by kinescope) by the improvised Paramount Television Network from 1950 to 1955. It was created by animator Bob Clampett, who later reused its main characters for the animated series Beany and Cecil. The show won three Emmy Awards for best children's show.

== History ==
The principal characters were Beany, a plucky young boy who wears a beanie cap; the brave but dimwitted Cecil the Seasick Sea Serpent, who claimed to be 300 years old and 35 ft 3 in (10.74 m) tall; another serpent named Common Dragon (named after Carmen Dragon, a famous conductor); Beany's uncle, Captain Horatio K. (for Kermit) Huff'n'puff (whose name is a play on Horatio Hornblower), who would blow on the sails of the ship Leakin' Lena (see below) to make it go faster, familiarly called Uncle Captain; Dishonest John, a/k/a "D.J.", whose cape and handlebar mustache identified him obviously as a villain; another sometimes villain named Dudley Nightshade (named after Deadly Nightshade, a poisonous member of the family Solanaceae); Tear-a-long the Dotted Lion (who always had a fast entrance and whose name is in reference to the phrase "tear along the dotted line"); Mouth Full of Teeth Keith (a lion with false teeth); and Hopalong Wong (a Chinese version of Hopalong Cassidy, a tough cowboy actor). Another character, a circus clown aptly named Clowny, appeared in early episodes, but was later unused.

The principal voice actors and puppeteers were Daws Butler (Beany and Captain Huff'n'puff) and Stan Freberg (Cecil and Dishonest John). The writers were Charles Shows, Bill Scott, and Adam Bracci. The puppets were presented against simple sets or crude background drawings. After Butler and Freberg quit the show during 1952 or 1953, Jim MacGeorge, Irv Shoemaker and Walker Edmiston did the voice work and puppeting duties. Shoemaker assumed Freberg's roles, MacGeorge voiced Cap'n Huffenpuff, and Edmiston voiced Beany for a while, then left to do a new show Clampett had launched, whereupon MacGeorge and Dick Nelson began doing Beany's voice. Scatman Crothers voiced two characters for the show. Korla Pandit served as the show's organist.

== Premise ==
Time for Beany recounted the exotic voyages and landfalls of the ship Leakin' Lena as commanded by the sometimes inept "Uncle" Captain Huffenpuff. The daily episodes, each fifteen minutes in length, frequently contained topical references, usually of a satirical nature. One episode portrayed President Harry S. Truman in puppet form, accompanying Cecil's singing. Other characters spoofed popular entertainers; examples are Dinah Saur and The Red Skeleton, parodies of Dinah Shore and Red Skelton. Children could laugh at the silliness, and adults could laugh at the political and social satire.

== Reception ==
Albert Einstein was reportedly a fan of the show. On one occasion, the physicist is said to have interrupted a meeting by announcing, "You will have to excuse me, gentlemen. It's Time for Beany." Musician and composer Frank Zappa was also a fan, as was Harpo Marx, according to an interview with his son William Marx.

== Popular culture ==
- The Animaniacs segment "Pinky and the Brain" paid homage to the show. In the episode "Puppet Rulers", Albert Einstein (who was a fan of Time for Beany) sits down with his nephew and niece to watch Time for Meany featuring Meany and Treacle (both voiced by Maurice LaMarche, who had voiced Dishonest John in the 1988 animated version of Beany & Cecil), which inspires Pinky and Brain to create a children's television show as part of a new plan to take over the world.
- Science fiction writer Larry Niven created an alien race he named Pierson's Puppeteers. The creatures are so called because they have two one-eyed heads on the ends of tentacle-like necks, giving them a faint resemblance to Cecil the Seasick Sea Serpent. A member of this race plays a major role in Niven's novel Ringworld. Niven also gives the show brief mention in the novel Lucifer's Hammer which he co-wrote with Jerry Pournelle.

== Videography ==
- Bob Clampett's Beany and Cecil: The Special Edition (Image Entertainment, 1999) (4 episodes)
