= Five Foot Two, Eyes of Blue (Has Anybody Seen My Girl?) =

1925 song

Sheet Music Cover
- Sheet music copyright 1925 by Leo Feist, Inc. Music by Ray Henderson, Lyrics by Sam M. Lewis & Joseph Widow Young. Ukulele arrangement by May Singhi Breen.

"Five Foot Two, Eyes of Blue (Has Anybody Seen My Girl?)" is an American popular song with lyrics by Sam M. Lewis & Joseph Widow Young and music by Ray Henderson that achieved its greatest popularity in the 1920s. As of January 1, 2021, the song has fallen into the public domain.

== Title ==
The song was copyrighted on October 19, 1925 as "Five foot two, eyes of blue; has anybody seen my girl" The shorter form of the title, "Five Foot Two, Eyes of Blue", has been used since the first release of the song and appears to have become the most common form. However "Five Foot Two, Eyes of Blue (Has Anybody Seen My Girl)" with brackets was on the label of Gene Austin's 1926 hit version and is a common alternative (often without a question mark, as on Austin's record and in the 1925 copyright). Some releases have used simply Has Anybody Seen My Girl? and there are examples of Has Anybody Seen My Gal?

== Origin ==
Accounts of who originally composed "Has Anybody Seen My Girl?" vary, particularly since the song, especially its lyrics, was often modified. Some sources state that Percy Wenrich wrote the music and Jack Mahoney the lyrics, in 1914. Credit for the most popular version of the song, though, is given to Ray Henderson for the music, and Sam M. Lewis and Joseph Widow Young for the lyrics. It was this version that was recorded by The California Ramblers in 1925.

== Recordings ==
The song was first recorded on October 19, 1925 by Lanin's Red Heads (vocals by Art Gillham) and has been covered by many other artists since, including The Golden Gate Orchestra (pseudonym of The California Ramblers), Arthur Fields, Tiny Hill, Guy Lombardo, Mitch Miller, Dean Martin, Freddy Cannon, Shane Fenton and the Fentones, Mickey Gilley, Milla Jovovich, Tim Waurick, and the Kim Sisters. Gene Austin recorded a version in December 1925 (titled "Five Foot Two Eyes Of Blue") which became a top-seller in 1926. Nick Lucas sang the song in a recording that was used in the 1974 movie The Great Gatsby. Bing Crosby included the song in a medley on his album On the Happy Side (1962). Patty Pravo covered the song on her first album in 1968.

== Cultural appearances ==
The 1952 Hollywood comedy film Has Anybody Seen My Gal? was set in the 1920s and used the song, among a few others from that era, but these musical touches were unrelated to the plot. The song was the theme song for TV's The Ina Ray Hutton Show during the 1950s. The song was featured in the 1936 Our Gang short film "The Pinch Singer", performed by a fictional group named "The Plantation Trio". Lucille Ball performs this song in an episode of I Love Lucy, and also in the episode of The Lucy Show titled "Lucy's College Reunion", in both performances playing the ukulele. Terry-Thomas, playing a banjo ukulele, performed the song in a duet with Liberace at the piano in an episode of The Liberace Show in 1969.

In 1984, it was used by the Walter Mondale 1984 presidential campaign to introduce vice-presidential candidate Geraldine Ferraro (who was actually five feet, four inches).

More recently used in CSI: Cyber Season one, episode eight, "Selfie 2.0", the song was referenced when the agents were profiling victims; and, was used as dance music in the 2018 semi-final of Strictly Come Dancing by Stacey Dooley, and her professional partner Kevin Clifton.

The Guy Lombardo version of the song appears in Gaga: Five Foot Two, a 2017 documentary film about American singer-songwriter Lady Gaga.

== Lyrics ==
The Jack Mahoney lyrics (1914) are the same as the chorus used in the Sam M. Lewis & Joseph Widow Young version (1925). Minor variations exist in recorded versions — for example, "pearls" and "hers" instead of "fur" and "her".

Five foot two, eyes of blue,
But oh! what those five foot could do,
Has anybody seen my gal?
Turned-up nose, turned-down hose,
Flapper, yes sir, one of those,
Has anybody seen my gal?

Now if you run into a five-foot-two
Covered with fur,
Diamond rings, and all those things,
Bet your life it isn't her,
But could she love, could she woo,
Could she, could she, could she coo!
Has anybody seen my gal?

This is the chorus. There are two verses as well.

== Football popular culture ==
The song became a popular football terrace chant in England in the late 1960s and early 1970s in homage of players with particularly hard tackling reputations, most notably at Manchester United Football Club player Jim Holton. Fans adapted the lyrics "Six Foot two, eyes of blue, big Jim Holton's after you..."
