= Hollywood Wrestling =

American professional wrestling TV series

- Country of origin: United States

Original release
- Network: Syndicated (Paramount Television Network)
- Release: 1947 – 1955

Hollywood Wrestling, also known as Wrestling From Hollywood, is an American professional wrestling television series which originally aired locally in Los Angeles on KTLA in the early 1950s, and by 1952, was broadcast nationally (via kinescope) by the improvised Paramount Television Network. Produced by Klaus Landsberg, it was also the first professional wrestling television series to air on national television.

== History ==
Pioneer television station KTLA broadcast pro wrestling matches as early as 1947, when the station began airing televised wrestling from the Grand Olympic Auditorium. Originally, the bouts were sponsored by the Ford Motor Company.

By 1952, the matches were being syndicated nationally on the Paramount Television Network. The series was filmed (via kinescope) and then delivered to stations in the network. Hollywood Wrestling was a popular series, and although it was not seen in all areas of the United States, it did air on the following stations:

- WLEV-TV, Allentown, PA
- KFDA-TV, Amarillo, TX
- WBAL-TV, Baltimore, MD
- WAAM-TV, Baltimore
- KGBT-TV, Brownsville, TX
- WWTV, Cadillac, MI
- KCRG-TV, Cedar Rapids, IA
- WBTV, Charlotte, NC
- WJW-TV, Cleveland
- WFAA, Dallas
- WOC-TV, Davenport, IA
- WHIO-TV, Dayton
- KBTV, Denver
- KFEL-TV, Denver
- WEAU-TV, Eau Claire, WI
- WDAY-TV, Fargo, ND
- WOOD-TV, Grand Rapids, MI
- KPRC-TV, Houston
- KID-TV, Idaho Falls, ID
- WFBM-TV, Indianapolis
- WJTV, Jackson, MS
- WGAL, Lancaster, PA
- KSWO-TV, Lawton, OK
- WLVA-TV, Lynchburg, VA
- KEYD-TV, Minneapolis
- KNOE-TV, Monroe, LA
- KPTV, Portland, OR
- KZTV, Reno
- KEMO, St. Louis
- KSTP-TV, St. Paul
- KEYL, San Antonio
- KGO-TV, San Francisco
- KTVW, Seattle
- KELO-TV, Sioux Falls, SD
- KMO-TV, Tacoma
- WEAT-TV, West Palm Beach, FL
- WSBA-TV, York, PA
