= The Ina Ray Hutton Show =

American television show

The Ina Ray Hutton Show is a TV show starring prominent female jazz bandleader Ina Ray Hutton and her all-female orchestra. From October 30, 1950, until October 9, 1951, the program was sponsored by Altes Beer on KTLA. From 1951 to 1955, the show was a regional television show on the Paramount Television Network (PTN) flagship station KTLA. It then had a brief network run on NBC during the summer of 1956. Actress Diane Brewster was the announcer in the 1956 iteration of the series.

The show's theme song was "Has Anybody Seen My Gal?" by The California Ramblers.
