= Martti Helde =

Estonian film director and scenarist

Martti Helde (born 23 August 1987 in Rootsi, Kohila Parish) is an Estonian film director and screenwriter.

In 2015 he graduated from the Estonian Academy of Music and Theatre in theatrical leader (Estonian: näitejuhtimine) speciality.

== Filmography ==
- 2013 "Superbia" (short film; director and screenwriter)
- 2014 "Ristuules" ("In the Crosswind") (feature film; director and screenwriter)
- 2015 "Kontakt" (feature film; director)
- 2017 "Kümme, üheksakümmend" (documentary film; director)
- 2018 "Seltsimees laps" (feature film; director of mass scenes)
- 2019 "Skandinaavia vaikus" ("Scandinavian Silence") (feature film; director and screenwriter)
- 2024 "Vara küps" (feature film; director)
