= Gottlieb Welté =

German painter (died 1792)

Christian Gottlieb Welté (3 December 1745/49 – 17 December 1792) was an etcher and landscape painter from Mainz, Germany.

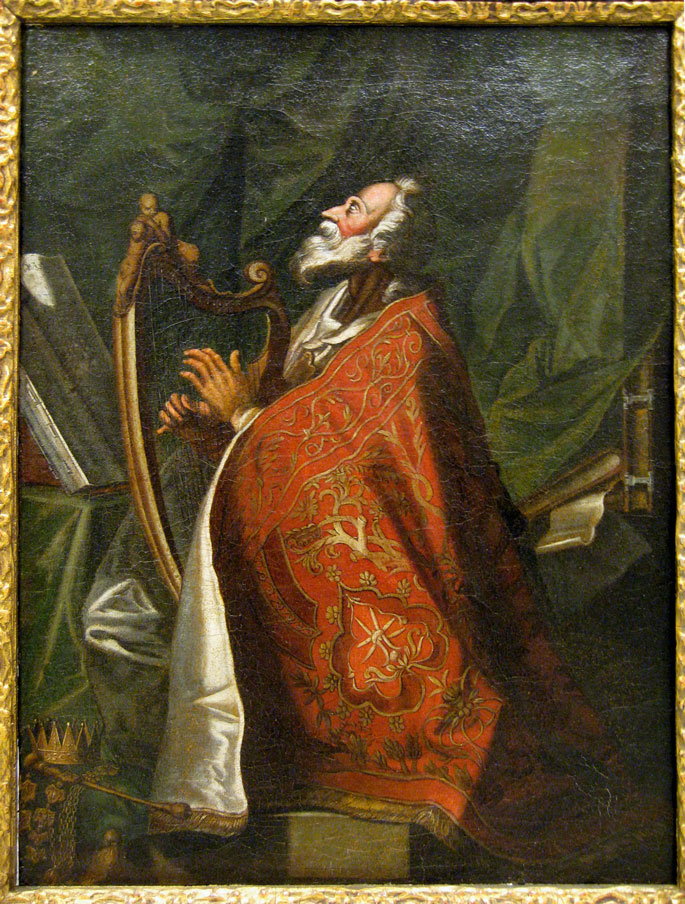
Le roi David

His works, accomplished mostly in small format, represent rococo and transition to early classicism. In the Russian Empire, in an area that is now Estonoia, he painted figural staffages on large Põltsamaa landscapes and depicted Estonian peasants in the 1780s; in Mainz and Frankfurt-am-Main he was known mostly as an etcher and a landscapist. Welté was a typical artist of the Enlightenment – pensive, developing and nonconformist.

He worked in Estonia in the late 18th century at the Põltsamaa Castle and Põltsamaa porcelain manufacture (1781–1784), then as a homeschool teacher in the Võisiku manor (1785–1788) and spent his last years at the Lohu manor in the present-day Kohila Parish, Rapla County, where he died in 1792.

His most important work, the illusionist fresco wall paintings in the hall of the Lohu manor covering 27,6 m^{2}, were discovered in the 1960s under the Grisaille pictorial fresco wall papers on the theme of Don Quixote, printed by "Jacquemart & Bénard" in Paris, France.
