= Pahkla =

Village in Estonia

Coordinates: 59°10′56″N 24°51′21″E

- Village
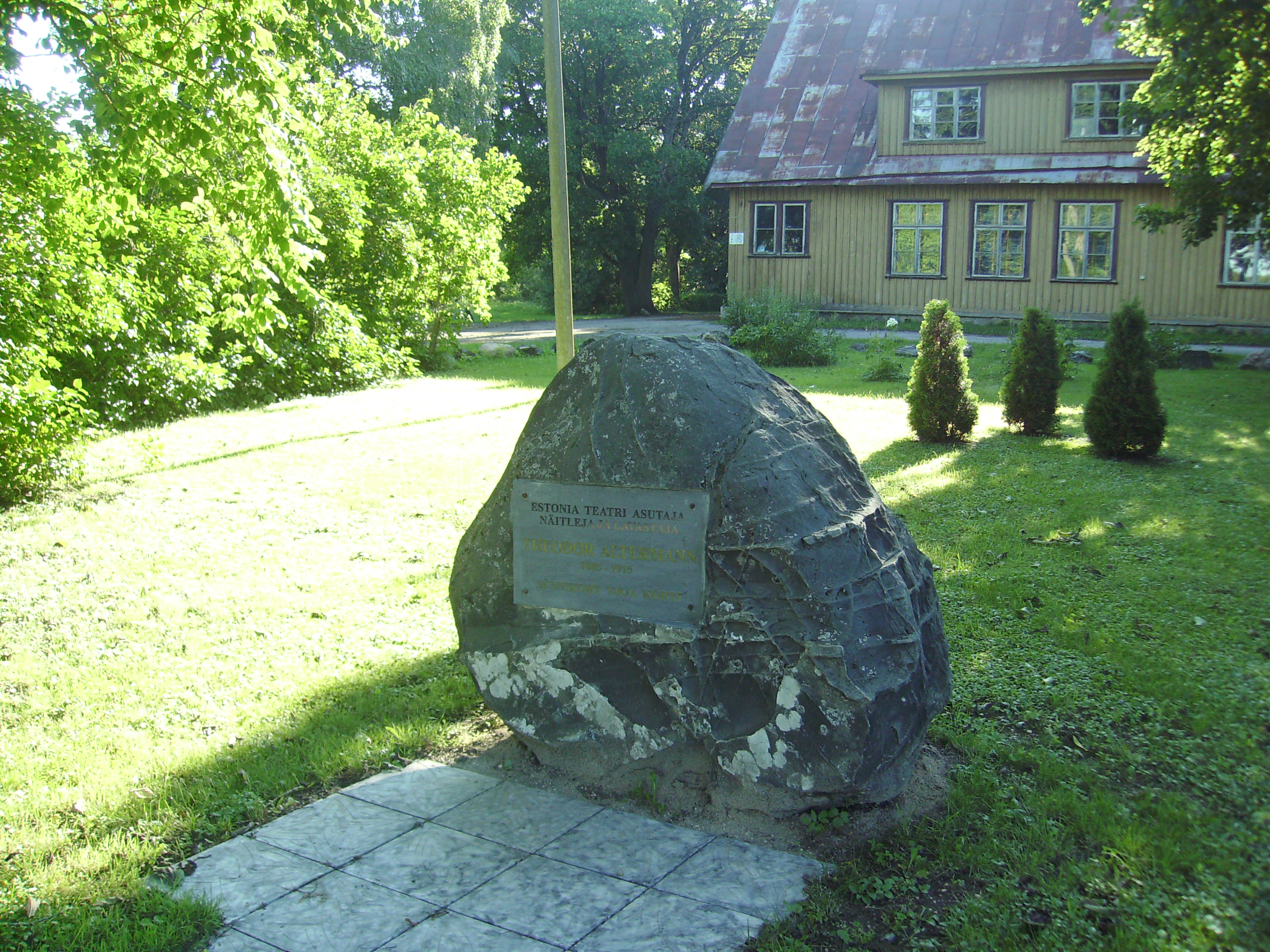
- Memorial to Estonian theatre director and actor Theodor Altermann
- Interactive map of Pahkla
- Country: Estonia
- County: Rapla County
- Parish: Kohila Parish
- Time zone: UTC+2 (EET)
  - Summer (DST): UTC+3 (EEST)

Pahkla (German: Pachel) is a village in Kohila Parish, Rapla County in northwestern Estonia.

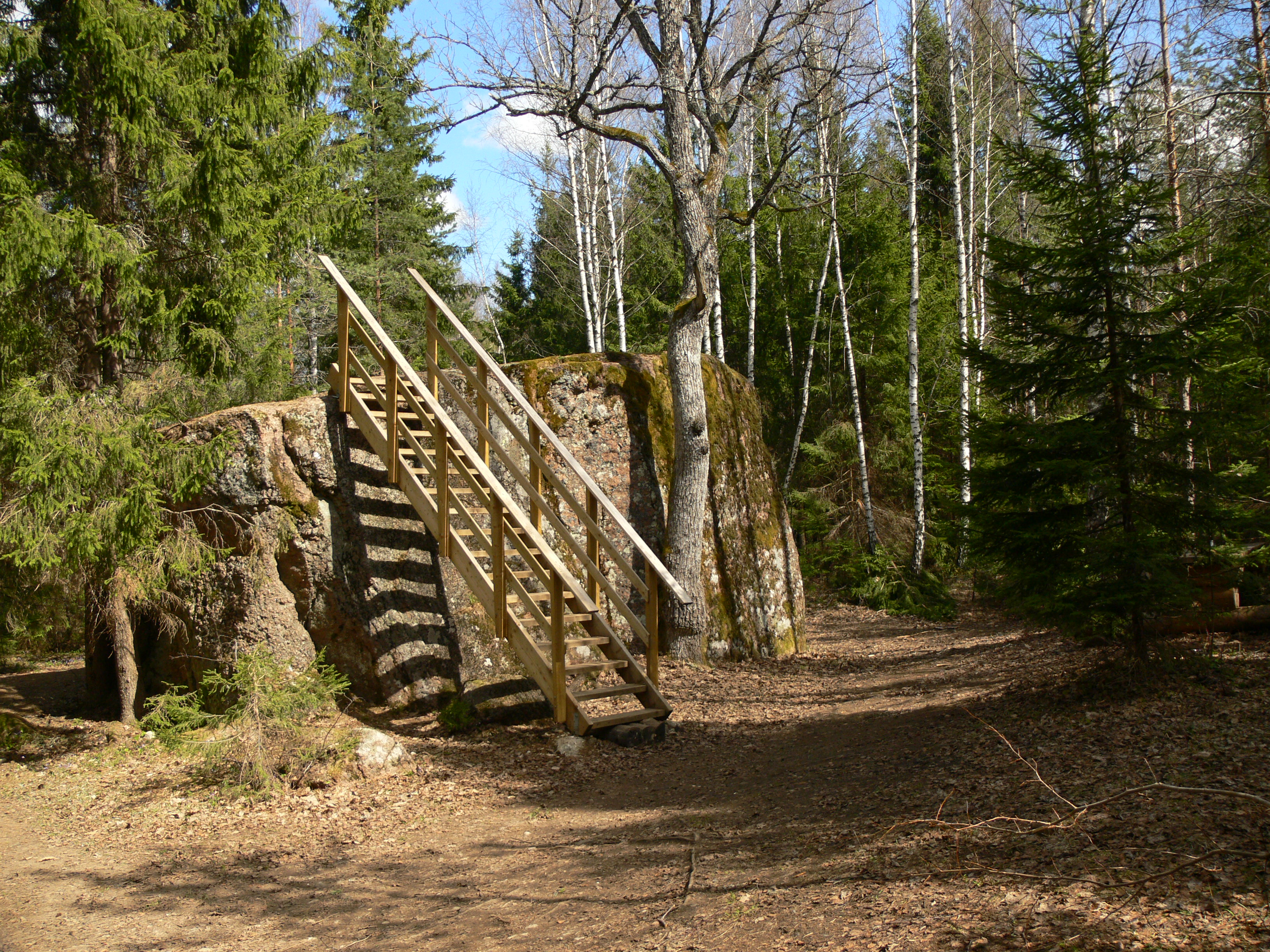
Pahkla Suurkivi, a large glacial erratic boulder
