= Vilivere =

Village in Rapla County, Estonia

- Village
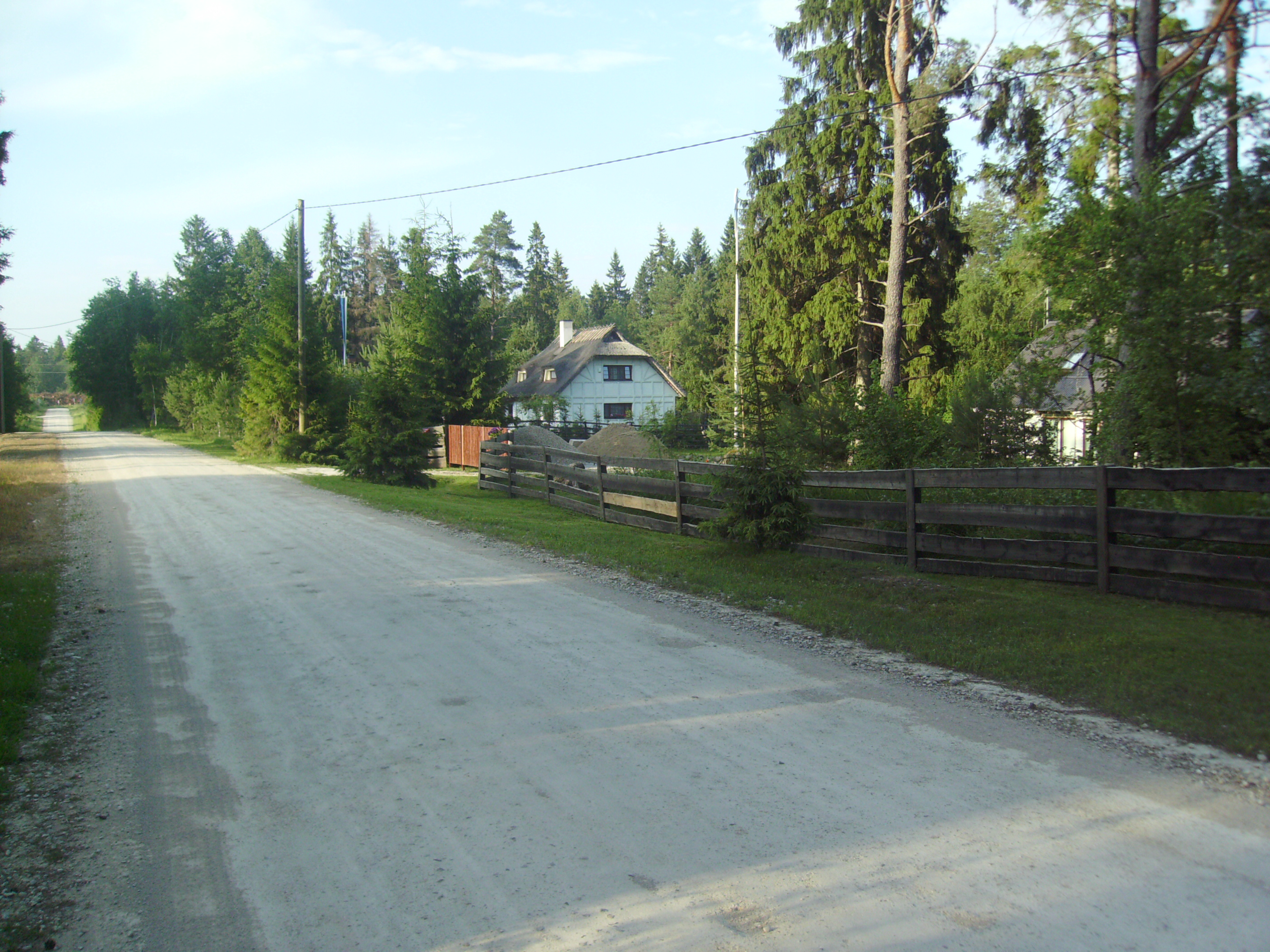

- Location within Estonia
- Coordinates: 59°12′N 24°43′E
- Country: Estonia
- County: Rapla County
- Parish: Kohila Parish
- Time zone: UTC+2 (EET)
  - Summer (DST): UTC+3 (EEST)

Vilivere is a village in Kohila Parish, Rapla County, in northwestern Estonia.

Vilivere railway station on the Tallinn–Viljandi railway line, operated by Elron (rail transit), is a short distance from the village.
