= Masti, Estonia =

Village in Estonia

Coordinates: 59°11′N 24°43′E

Masti
- Village
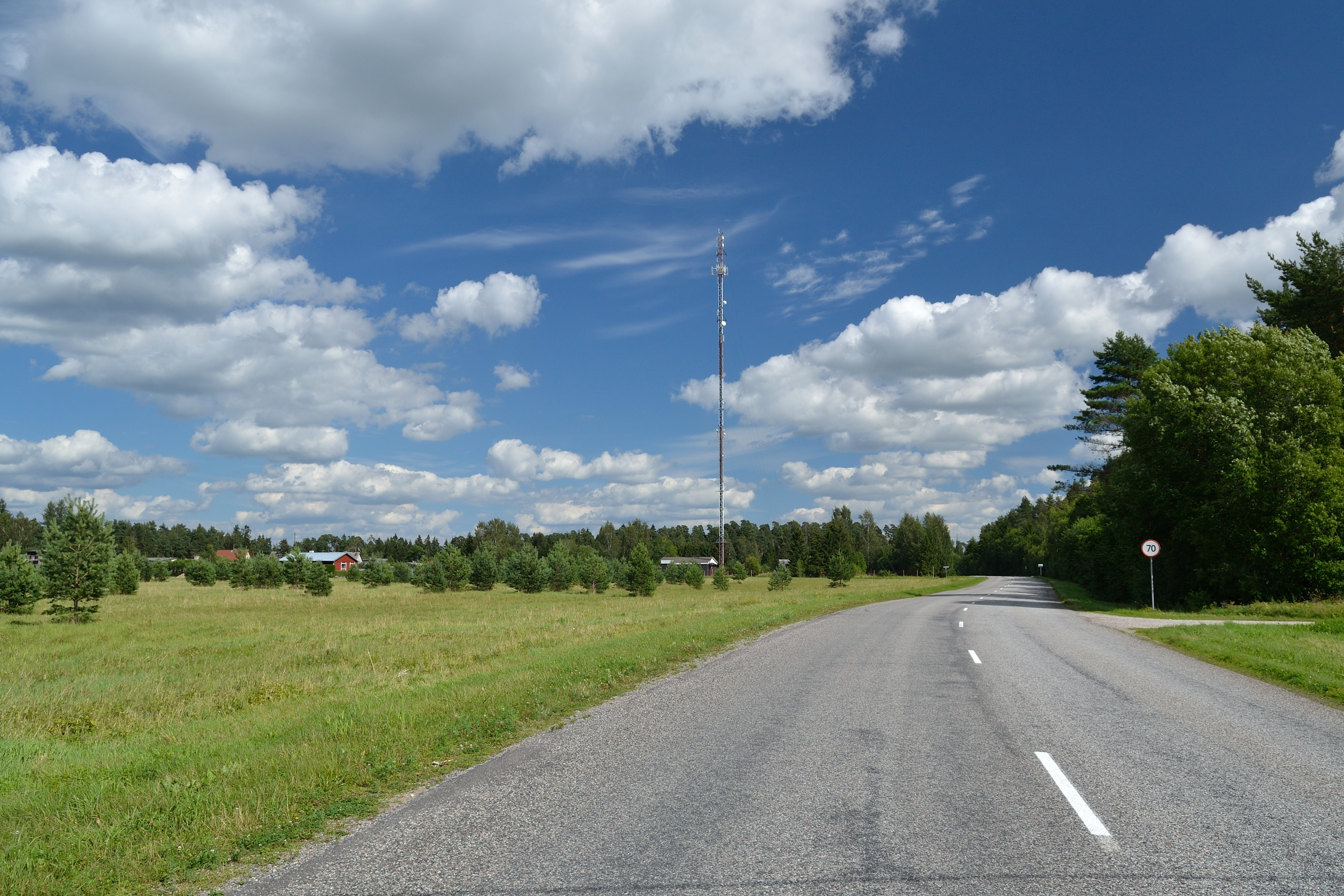
- Interactive map of Masti
- Country: Estonia
- County: Rapla County
- Parish: Kohila Parish
- Time zone: UTC+2 (EET)
  - Summer (DST): UTC+3 (EEST)

Masti is a village in Kohila Parish, Rapla County in northwestern Estonia.
