= Pukamäe =

Village in Estonia

Coordinates: 59°09′00″N 24°46′14″E

- Village
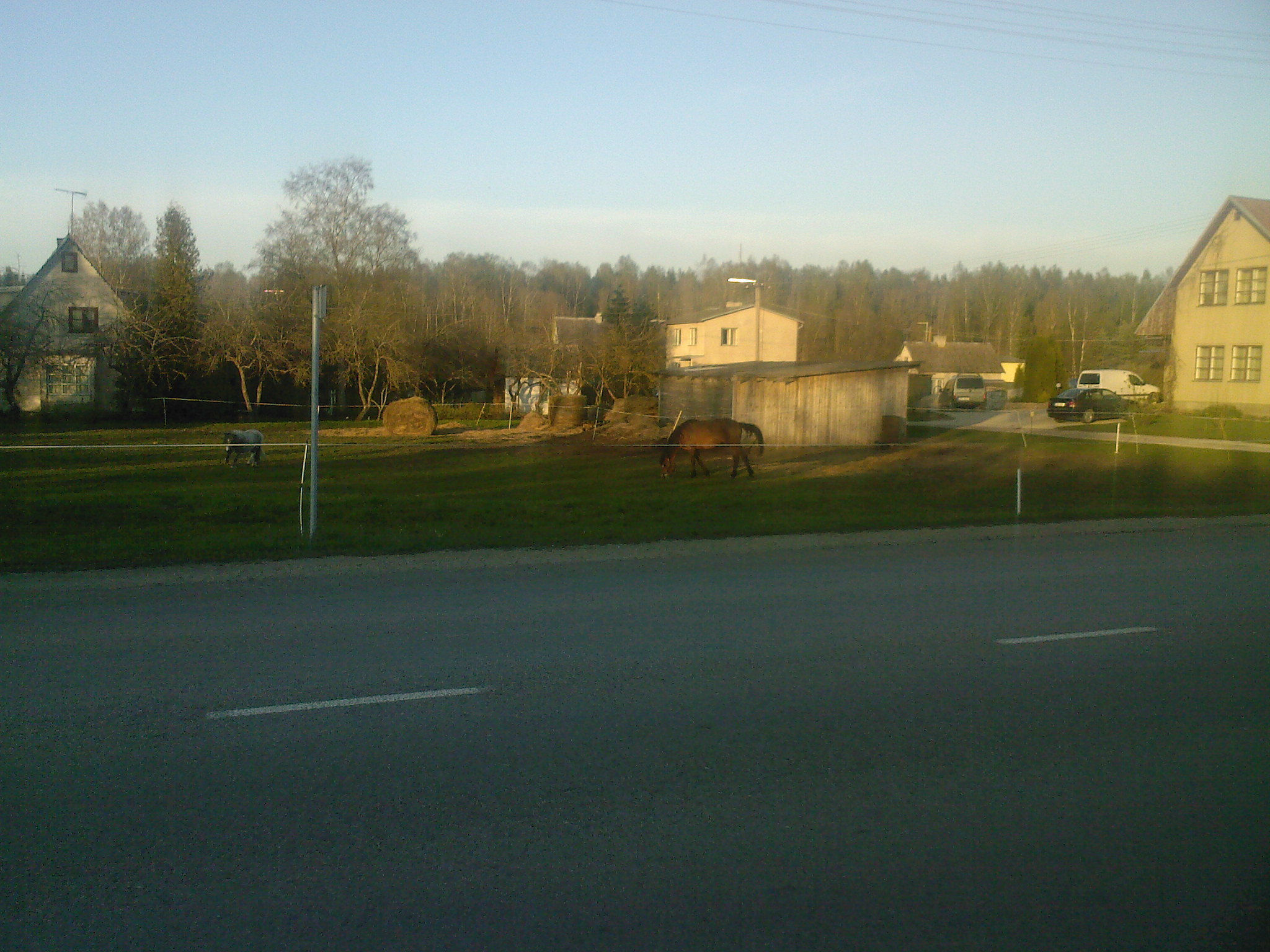
- Interactive map of Pukamäe
- Country: Estonia
- County: Rapla County
- Parish: Kohila Parish
- Time zone: UTC+2 (EET)
  - Summer (DST): UTC+3 (EEST)

Pukamäe is a village in Kohila Parish, Rapla County in northwestern Estonia.
