= Lümandu, Kohila Parish =

Village in Estonia

Coordinates: 59°10′N 24°35′E

Lümandu
- Village
- Interactive map of Lümandu
- Country: Estonia
- County: Rapla County
- Parish: Kohila Parish
- Time zone: UTC+2 (EET)
  - Summer (DST): UTC+3 (EEST)

Lümandu is a village in Kohila Parish, Rapla County in northwestern Estonia.
