= Prillimäe =

Borough in Estonia

- Small borough
- Location in Estonia
- Coordinates: 59°10′43″N 24°47′46″E
- Country: Estonia
- County: Rapla County
- Municipality: Kohila Parish

Government
  - Village elder: Avo Treksler

Area
  - Total: 0.58 km^{2} (0.22 sq mi)

Population (01.10.2008)
  - Total: 375

Prillimäe is a small borough (Estonian: alevik) in Kohila Parish, Rapla County, northern Estonia. It has a population of 375 (as of 1 October 2008) and an area of 58 ha.
