= Angerja =

Village in Estonia

- Village
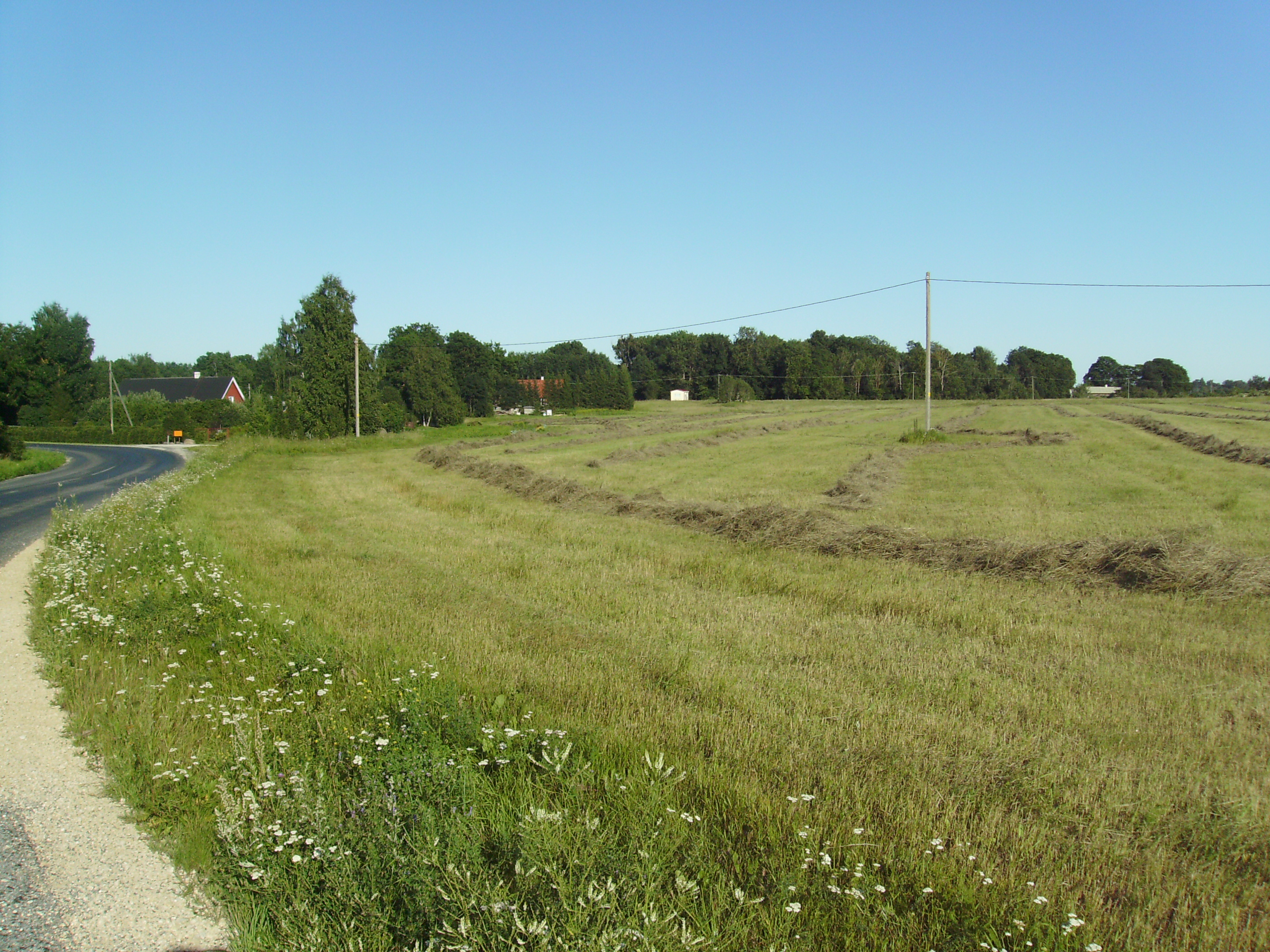

- Location in Estonia
- Coordinates: 59°10′28″N 24°51′07″E
- Country: Estonia
- County: Rapla County
- Municipality: Kohila Parish

Area
  - Total: 12.59 km^{2} (4.86 sq mi)

Population (1 October 2008)
  - Total: 65

Angerja
- Angern
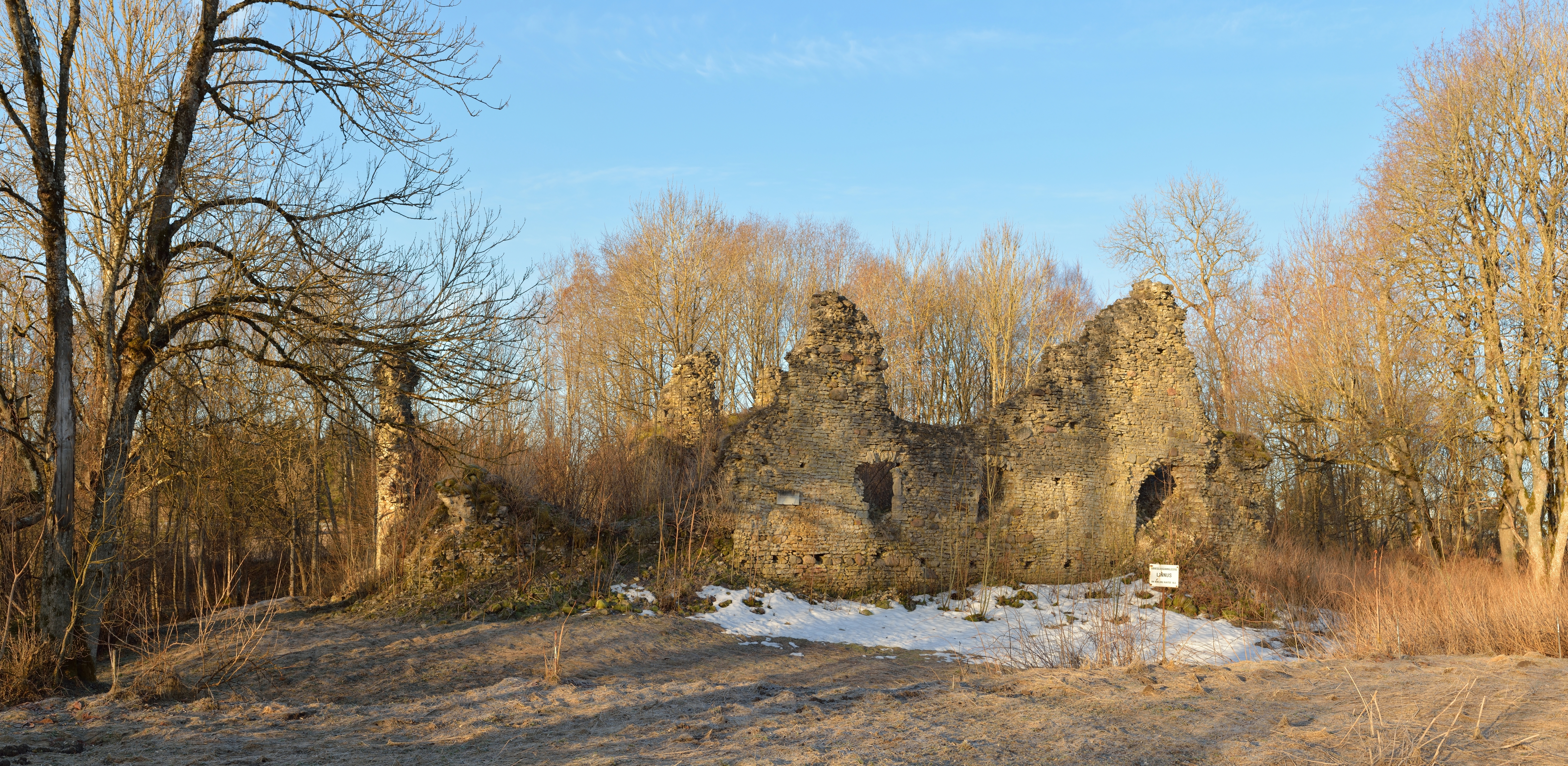
- Ruins of Angerja castle.

Site information
- Condition: Ruins

Site history
- Built: ca. 1400
- Built by: Teutonic Knights

Angerja is a village in Kohila Parish, Rapla County in northwestern Estonia. It has a population of 65 (as of 1 October 2008) and an area of 12.59 km^{2}.

A tower house was erected around 1400 as seat of a vassal of the Teutonic Knights.
