= Theodor Altermann =

Estonian actor, theatre director, and producer

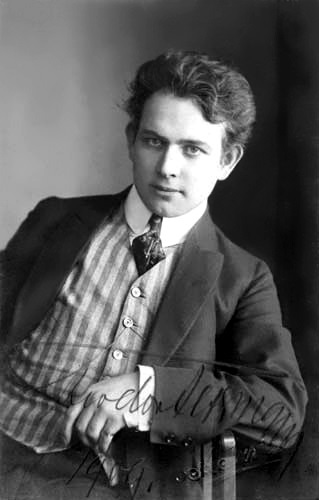
- Born: Theodor Altermann; 24 November 1885; Visja tavern, Visja village, Kohila Parish, Kreis Harrien, Governorate of Estonia
- Died: 15 April 1915 (aged 29); Tallinn, Governorate of Estonia
- Occupations: Actor, theatre director, producer
- Years active: 1905–1915
- Spouse: Milly Jürgenson

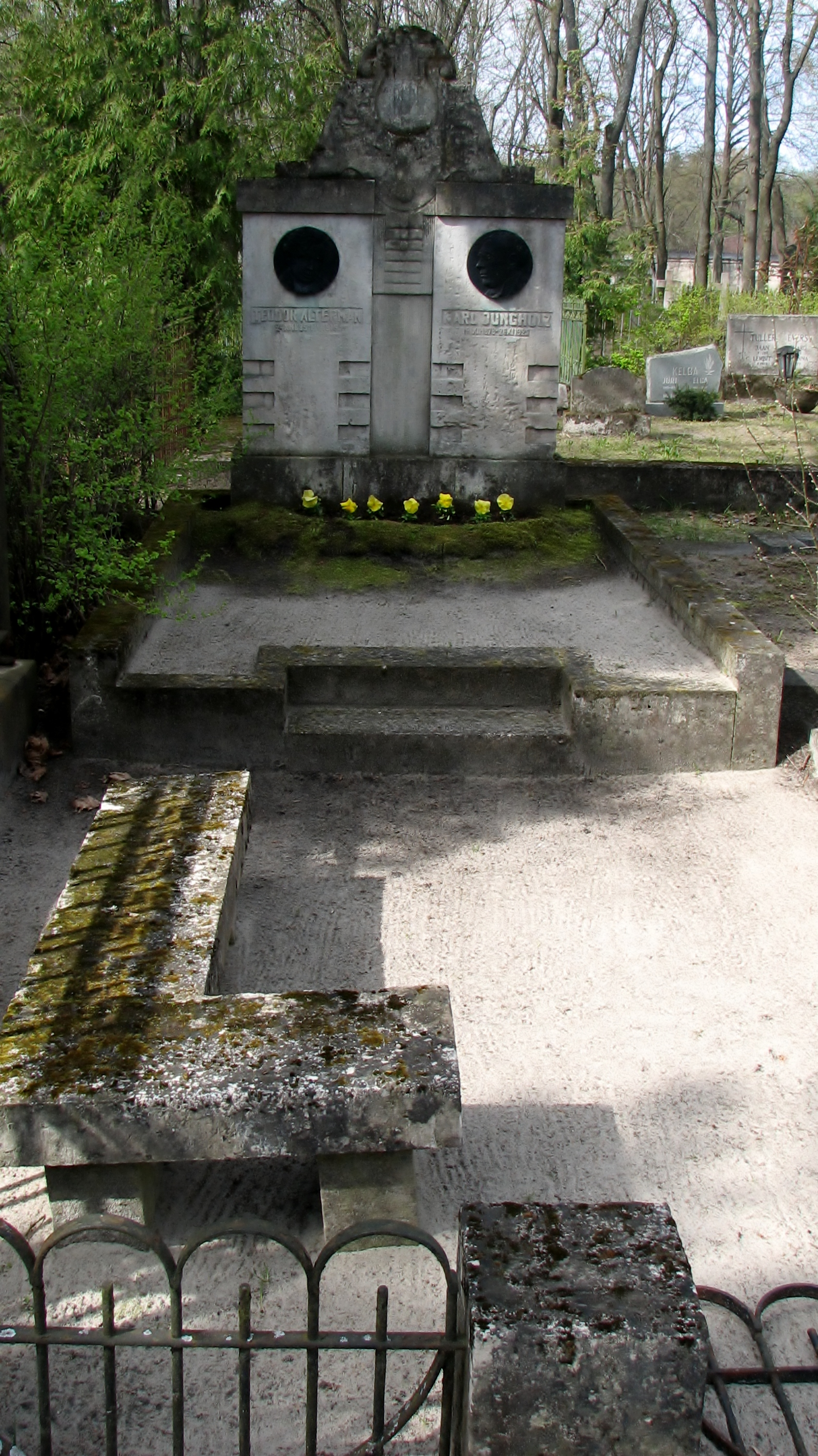
Grave of Altermann, to the left, next to that of Karl Jungholz, in Siselinna Cemetery, Tallinn

Theodor Altermann (24 November 1885 – 1 April 1915) was an Estonian actor, theatre director and producer. He was one of the founders of professional theatre in Estonia.

His father was Jüri Altermann, his mother was Miina Nurm.

== Sources ==
- Bernhard Linde, "Theodor Altermann" – Looming 1925, nr. 4, pp. 325–330
- "Theodor Altermann". Mälestusteos, autorid: Ants Lauter, Bernhard Linde, Paul Pinna, Albert Org, Hugo Raudsepp, Erna Villmer, Albert Üksip. Näitekunsti Sihtkapitali Valitsus, Tallinn 1940, 67 pp.
- Hugo Viires, "Theodor Altermann" – Looming 1940, nr. 9, pp. 1002–04
- Paul Pinna, "Theodor Altermann" – Looming 1945, nr. 11, pp. 1145–58
- Lilian Kirepe, "Theodor Altermann. Ülevaade elust ja tegevusest". Teatriteed series, "Eesti Raamat", Tallinn 1968, 77 pp.
- "Theodor Altermann – 100" – "Teater. Muusika. Kino" 1985, nr. 11, pp. 55–65
- Menning, Karl (2008). Teatritegu. Eesti mõttelugu. Tartu: Ilmamaa. ISBN 9789985772829., pp 169–171.
