= Ingrid Isotamm =

Estonian actress

- Born: 3 May 1979 (age 47); Palamuse, then part of Estonian SSR, Soviet Union
- Occupation: Actress
- Years active: 2000–present
- Spouse: Andres Dvinjaninov
- Children: 1

Ingrid Isotamm (born 3 May 1979) is an Estonian stage, film, radio and television actress.

== Early life and education ==
Ingrid Isotamm was born in the small borough of Palamuse in Jõgeva County in 1979. Her father was Gunnar Isotamm (1948–2003) and her mother is Lea Isotamm (née Kaukver). Both of her parents were authors. She graduated secondary school from the Oskar Luts Palamuse Gymnasium in 1997. Afterwards she studied acting under the supervision of actor and teacher Andres Noormets at the University of Tartu Viljandi Culture Academy in Viljandi, graduating in 2001.

== Stage career ==
In 2002, Isotamm became engaged as an actress at the NUKU theatre (the Estonian Puppet and Youth Theatre; formerly the Estonian State Puppet Theatre) in Tallinn. She has appeared in a number of roles at the NUKU in stage productions of works by such authors and playwrights as: Shakespeare, Jakob Michael Reinhold Lenz, Ivar Põllu, Gianni Rodari, Judy Upton, Jim Jacobs and Warren Casey, Külli Kangur, Selma Lagerlöf, Priit Põldma, Aino Pervik, Astrid Lindgren, Nikolai Gogol, and Éric-Emmanuel Schmitt.

Apart from the NUKU theatre, Ingrid Isotamm has also performed on the stages of the Vanemuine in Tartu, the Endla Theatre in Pärnu, and the Ugala theatre in Viljandi, among others.

== Television, film and radio ==
Beginning in 2007, Ingrid Isotamm has appeared on a number of Estonian television programs. These include: a 2007 appearance on the ETV crime series Ohtlik lend, several appearances from 2007 until 2011 on the Kanal 2 crime series Kelgukoerad, several appearances on the TV3 crime-comedy series Kättemaksukontor between 2009 and 2014, and a 2014 role on the Kanal 2 crime drama Viimane võmm.

Memorable radio plays that Isotamm has appeared in include: Måvens ja Peder meedia rambivalguses in 2006 and Päev in 2008.

In 2007, Isotamm appeared in the Nikolai Mihailišin directed short film Puhata ja mängida opposite actor Kristo Viiding. In 2014 she had a large role as Hermiine in the Martti Helde directed drama Risttuules for Allfilm. Risttuules chronicles the Soviet deportations from Estonia beginning in May 1941 following the Soviet occupation in 1940. In 2018, she appeared in a starring role as Pia in the Maria Avdjuško-directed drama-mystery feature film Tuliliilia.

== Personal life ==
Ingrid Isotamm is married to actor and theatre director Andres Dvinjaninov. The couple had a daughter born in 2011. They currently reside in Tallinn.
