= In the Crosswind =

2014 film

- Film poster
- Directed by: Martti Helde
- Written by: Martti Helde; Liis Nimik
- Starring: Einar Hillep
- Music by: Pärt Uusberg
- Release date: 28 March 2014
- Running time: 87 minutes
- Country: Estonia
- Language: Estonian
- Box office: $ 20 705

In the Crosswind (Estonian: Risttuules) is a 2014 Estonian drama film directed by Martti Helde. It was screened in the Contemporary World Cinema section at the 2014 Toronto International Film Festival. The film is about the forced deportation by Stalin's Soviet Union of an Estonian family to Siberia in the June deportation. It is based on a real-life diary from the period and uses a long sequence of "living tableaus" for the main narrative to invoke the frozen nature of traumatizing events in an individual memory.

== Cast ==
- Einar Hillep as Chairman of the Kolkhoz
- Ingrid Isotamm as Hermiine
- Laura Peterson as Erna Tamm
- Mirt Preegel as Eliide
- Tarmo Song as Heldur

== Production ==
Filming took place at the Tapa Central Polygon, Sirgala, Kabala Railway Station, Viljandi County, Järva-Jaani Rural Municipality, Rae Rural Municipality, near Rakvere, Sillamäe and elsewhere.

In the spring of 2011, the film crew visited the documentary film forum "Docs in Thessaloniki" in Greece and found a co-producer from Austria and a foreign distributor there. Nearly 600 people participated on the film's production, who were also selected through a competition from nearly 2,000 people.

== Release ==
The film's international premiere took place in September 2014 at the Toronto International Film Festival in Canada. The film's American premiere took place in January 2015. The film was also screened in Sweden, Turkey and France.

In 2014, 18,063 people went to see the film in Estonian cinemas.

=== Festival Participation ===
- 2014 Toronto International Film Festival (Canada), screening in the main program
- 2014 Tallinn Dark Nights Film Festival (Estonia)

=== Awards ===
- 2012 Kaljo Kiisa Young Filmmaker Scholarship to Martti Helde for the films "Külm on" and "Risttuules"
- 2014 Tallinn Dark Nights Film Festival Awards: Best Cinematography Award to Erik Põllumaale (in the international competition program), Best Estonian Feature Film (Trident competition program), Federation of Film Clubs (FICC) Award for Don Quixote
- 2014 Warsaw International Film Festival (Poland), Ecumenical Jury Award
- 2014 Thessaloniki International Film Festival (Greece), Award for Outstanding Creative Achievement
- 2014 Mannheim-Heidelberg International Film Festival (Germany), Cinema Owners' Recommendation Award
- 2014 Estonian Film Journalists' Association Film of the Year Award: cash prize 2000 euros and a bronze statue of the Virgin Mary

== See also ==
- The Chronicles of Melanie, a similar 2016 Latvian film
- Population transfer in the Soviet Union
