= Hageri (village) =

Village in Estonia

Coordinates: 59°10′N 24°40′E

- Village
- Interactive map of Hageri
- Country: Estonia
- County: Rapla County
- Parish: Kohila Parish

Population (2011 Census)
  - Total: 128
- Time zone: UTC+2 (EET)
  - Summer (DST): UTC+3 (EEST)

Hageri is a village in Kohila Parish, Rapla County, northwestern Estonia. As of the 2011 census, the settlement's population was 128.
