= Loone =

Village in Estonia

Coordinates: 59°08′58″N 24°47′13″E

- Village
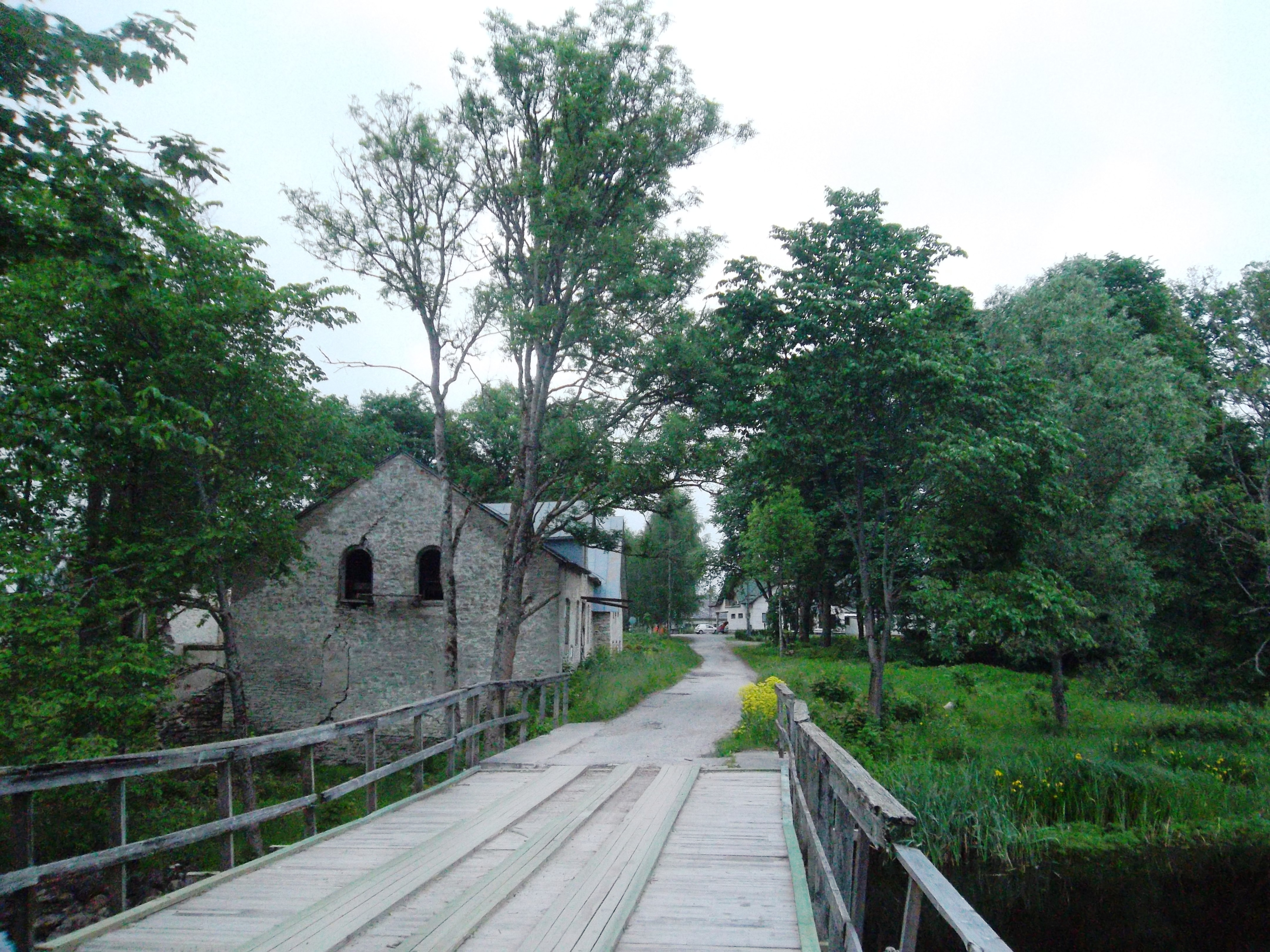
- Interactive map of Loone
- Country: Estonia
- County: Rapla County
- Parish: Kohila Parish
- Time zone: UTC+2 (EET)
  - Summer (DST): UTC+3 (EEST)

Loone is a village in Kohila Parish, Rapla County in northwestern Estonia.
