= Lohu =

Village in Estonia

- Village
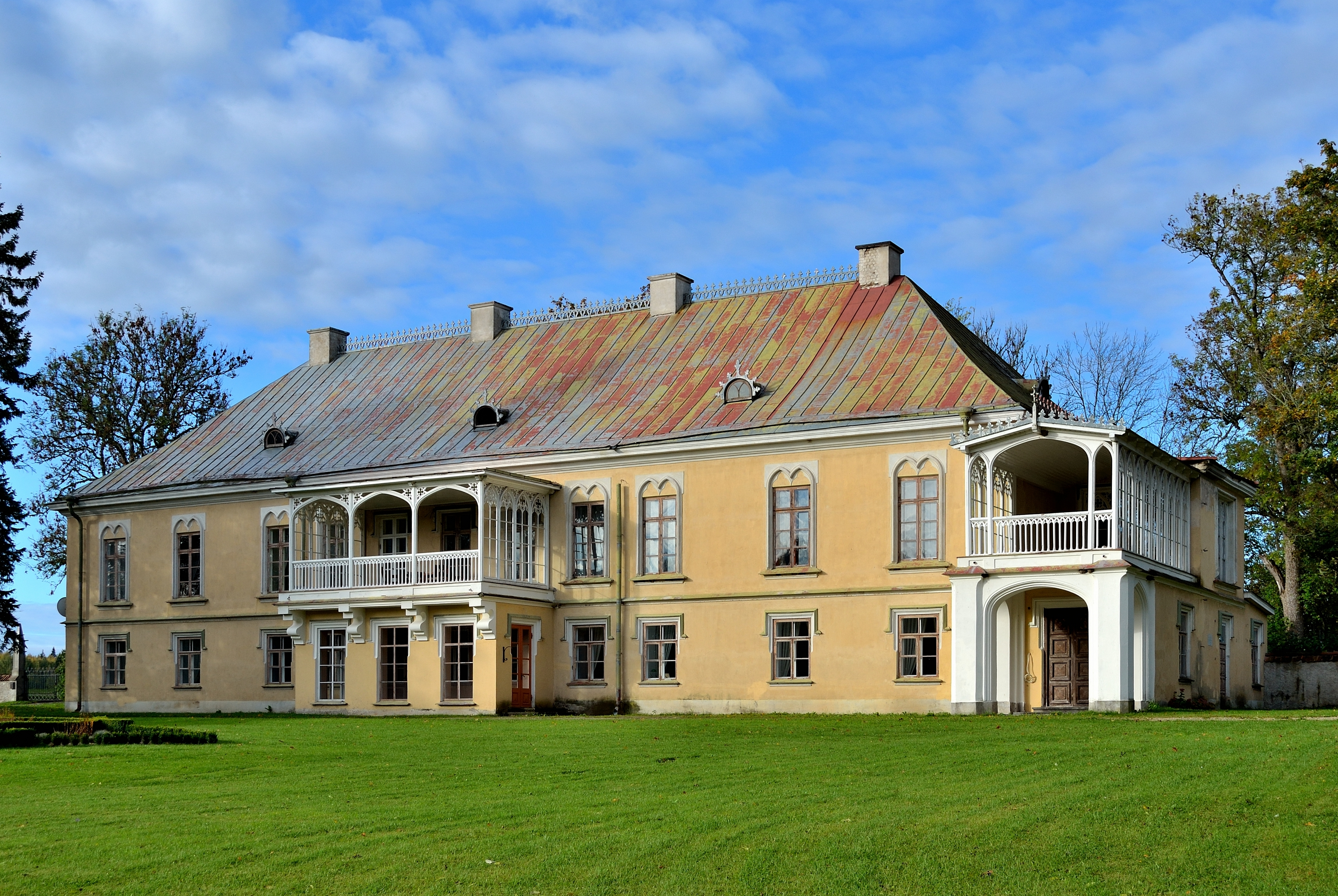
- Lohu manor main building

- Location in Estonia
- Coordinates: 59°08′00″N 24°47′00″E
- Country: Estonia
- County: Rapla County
- Parish: Kohila Parish
- Time zone: UTC+2 (EET)
  - Summer (DST): UTC+3 (EEST)

Lohu (German: Loal) is a village in Kohila Parish, Rapla County, in northwestern Estonia. Lohu railway station, on the Tallinn - Viljandi railway line operated by Elron, in a short distance from the village.

The Lohu Lelu company in Lohu produces wooden toys. It started trading in 1993.

== Lohu manor ==
Lohu manor house was built in 1620. It originally belonged to a Baltic German family, and throughout most of its history continued to be in the hands of the local aristocracy. When Estonia proclaimed its independence in 1919, sweeping land reforms seized lands owned by almost all Baltic German families and signed them over to ethnic Estonians. In 1920, the manor was owned by Johan Pitka although it later changed hands several times.

The original manor house was built of wood; it was replaced in the early 18th century by a stone house in baroque style, later used as a manager's estate. A new main classicist building was erected in the 1780s, partly altered in neo-Gothic fashion during the 19th century. The interior boasts some fine grisaille mural paintings, executed by Gottlieb Welté and considered to be among the finest examples of such interior details in Estonia. Other noteworthy interior details, such as the wainscoting and other carved wooden details, date from the late 19th century.
