= Andrus Saare =

Estonian politician (born 1965)

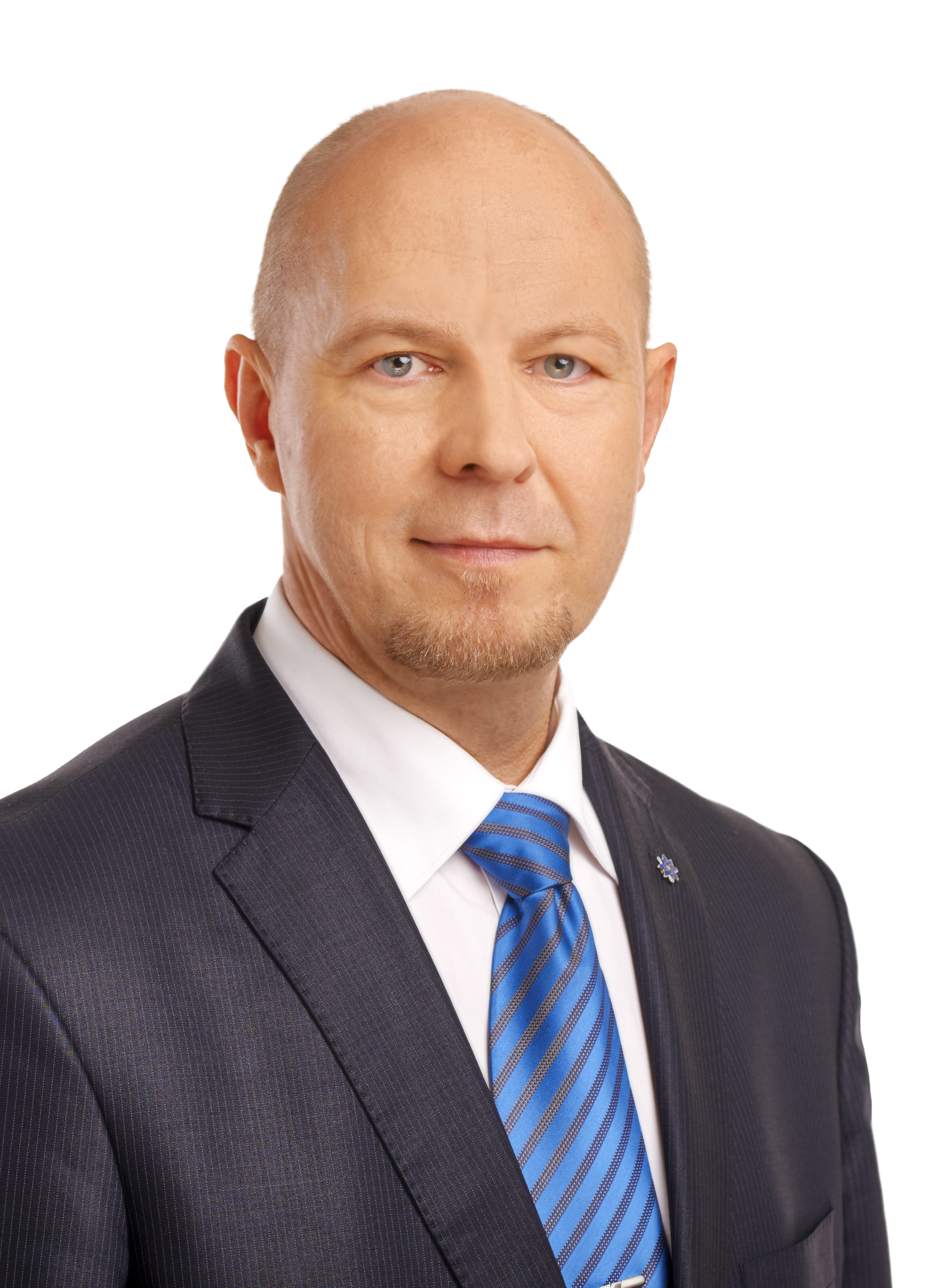
Andrus Saare

Andrus Saare (born 29 December 1965) is an Estonian politician. He was a member of XII Riigikogu.

Before becoming a member of the Riigikogu, Saare was the mayor of Kohila Parish from 1999 to 2005, and again from 2009 to 2011. He was a member of Pro Patria and Res Publica Union.
