= Sutlema =

Village in Estonia

Coordinates: 59°10′N 24°37′E

- Village
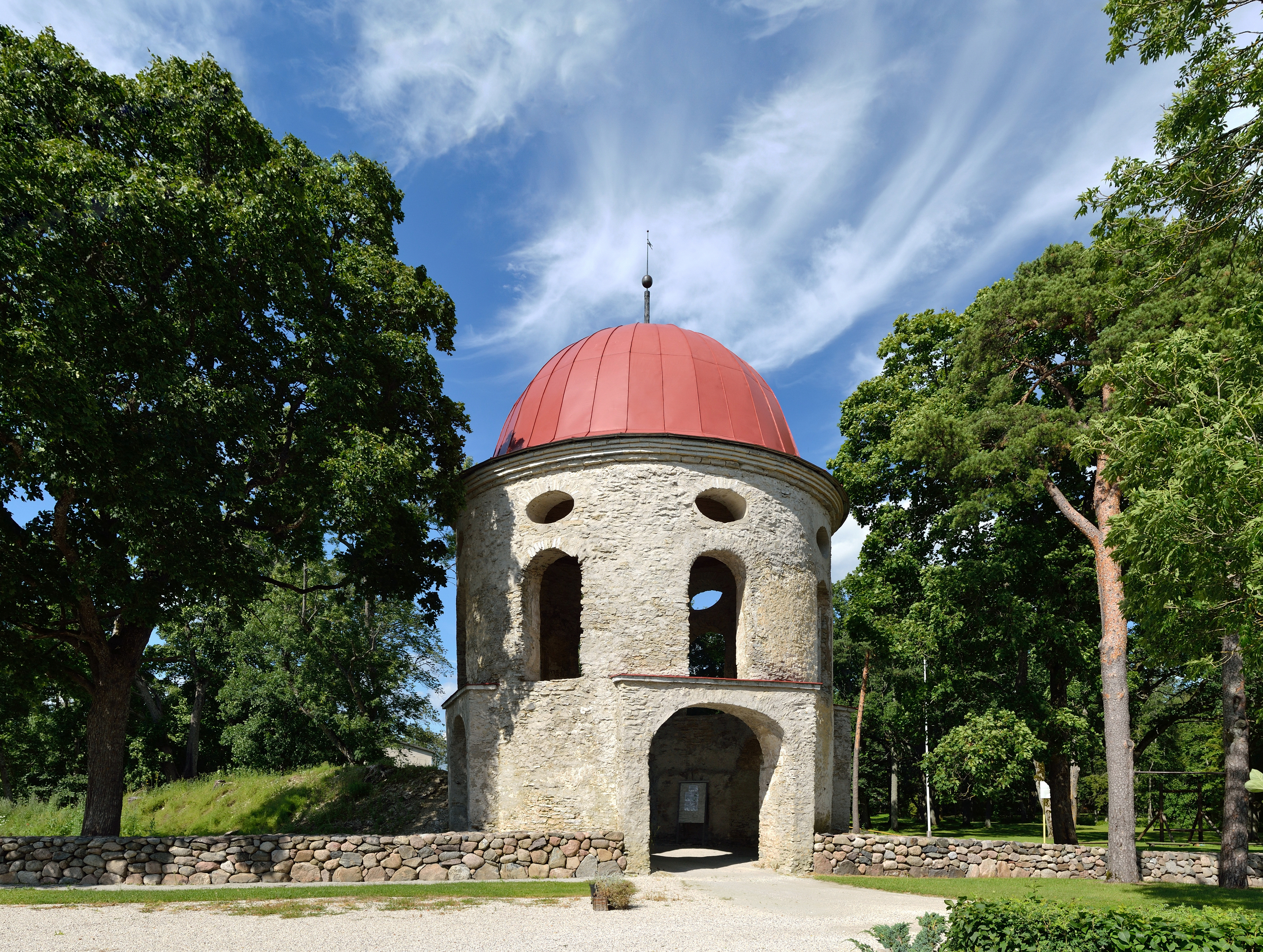
- Sutlema manor gate tower
- Interactive map of Sutlema
- Country: Estonia
- County: Rapla County
- Parish: Kohila Parish
- Time zone: UTC+2 (EET)
  - Summer (DST): UTC+3 (EEST)

Sutlema is a village in Kohila Parish, Rapla County in northwestern Estonia.
