= Kadaka, Rapla County =

Village in Estonia

Coordinates: 59°08′03″N 24°45′00″E

Kadaka
- Village
- Interactive map of Kadaka
- Country: Estonia
- County: Rapla County
- Parish: Kohila Parish
- Time zone: UTC+2 (EET)
  - Summer (DST): UTC+3 (EEST)

Kadaka is a village in Kohila Parish, Rapla County in northwestern Estonia.
