= Rabivere =

Village in Estonia

Coordinates: 59°07′N 24°41′E

- Village
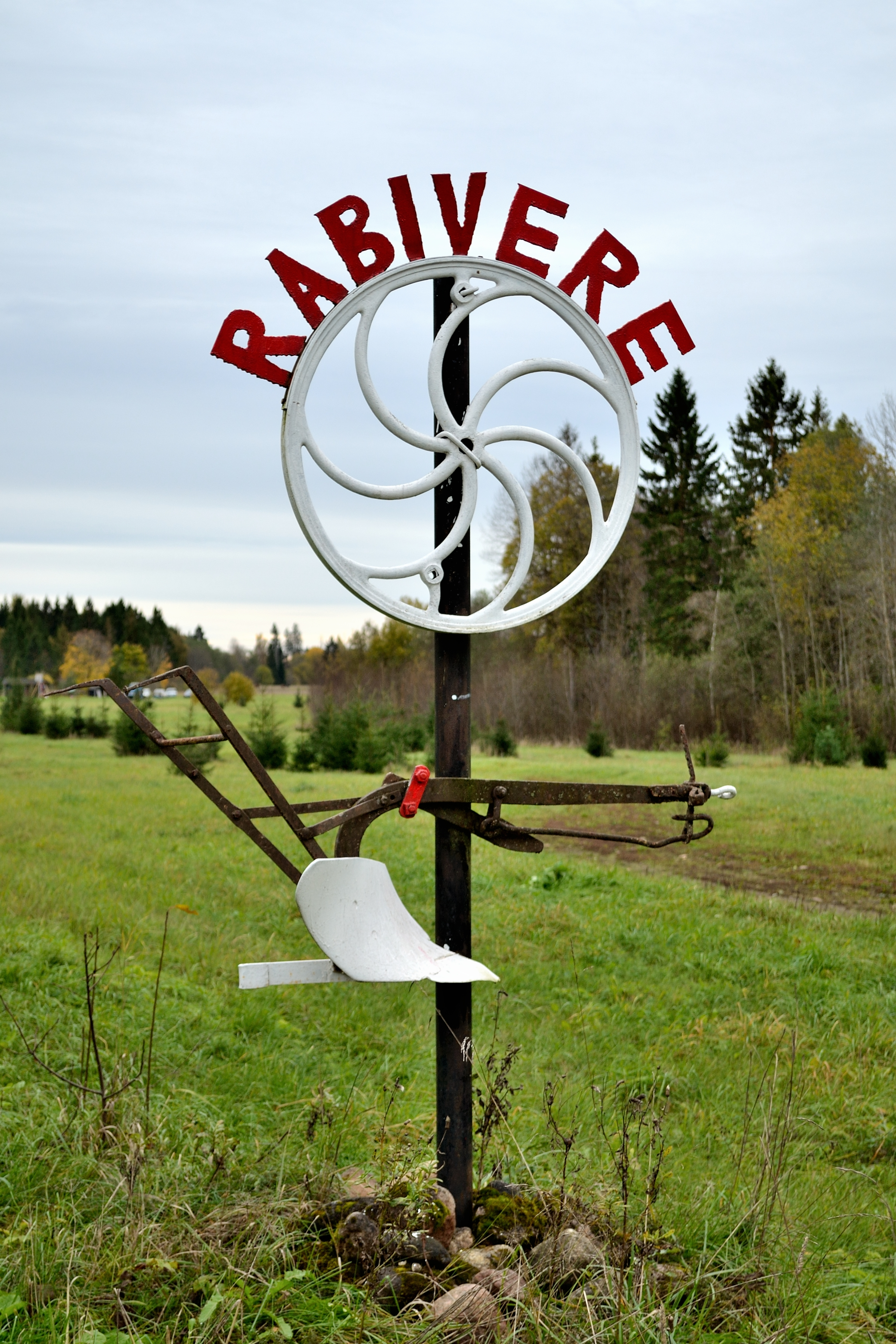
- Village sign
- Interactive map of Rabivere
- Country: Estonia
- County: Rapla County
- Parish: Kohila Parish
- Time zone: UTC+2 (EET)
  - Summer (DST): UTC+3 (EEST)

Rabivere is a village in Kohila Parish, Rapla County in northwestern Estonia.

== Rabivere manor ==
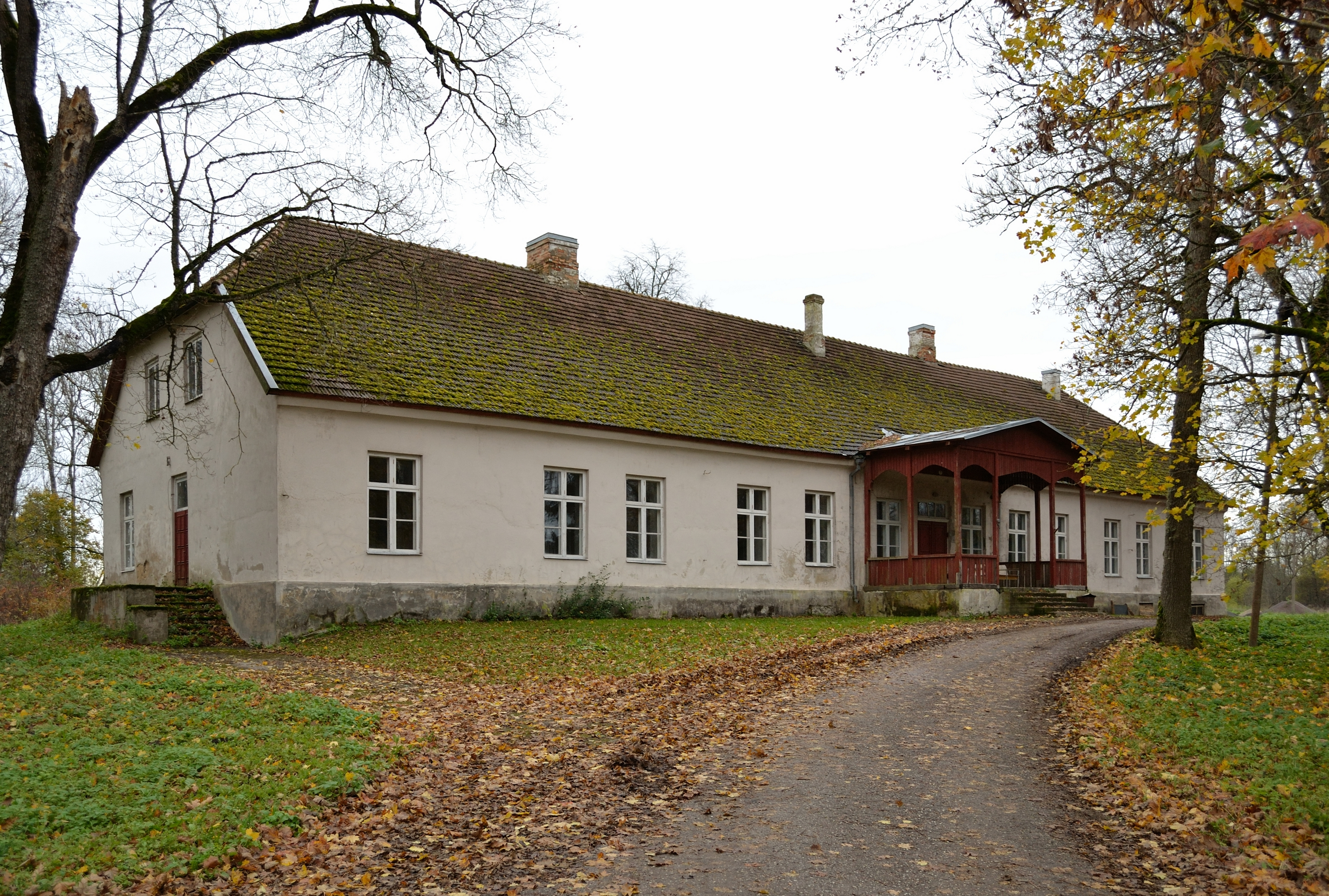
Rabivere manor main building

Rabivere estate (German: Rabbifer) is mentioned for the first time in written sources in 1417. The present manor house is a relatively small, one-storey building of an unusual, local simple baroque design and built of wood.
