= Aandu =

Village in Estonia

Coordinates: 59°09′N 24°43′E

- Village
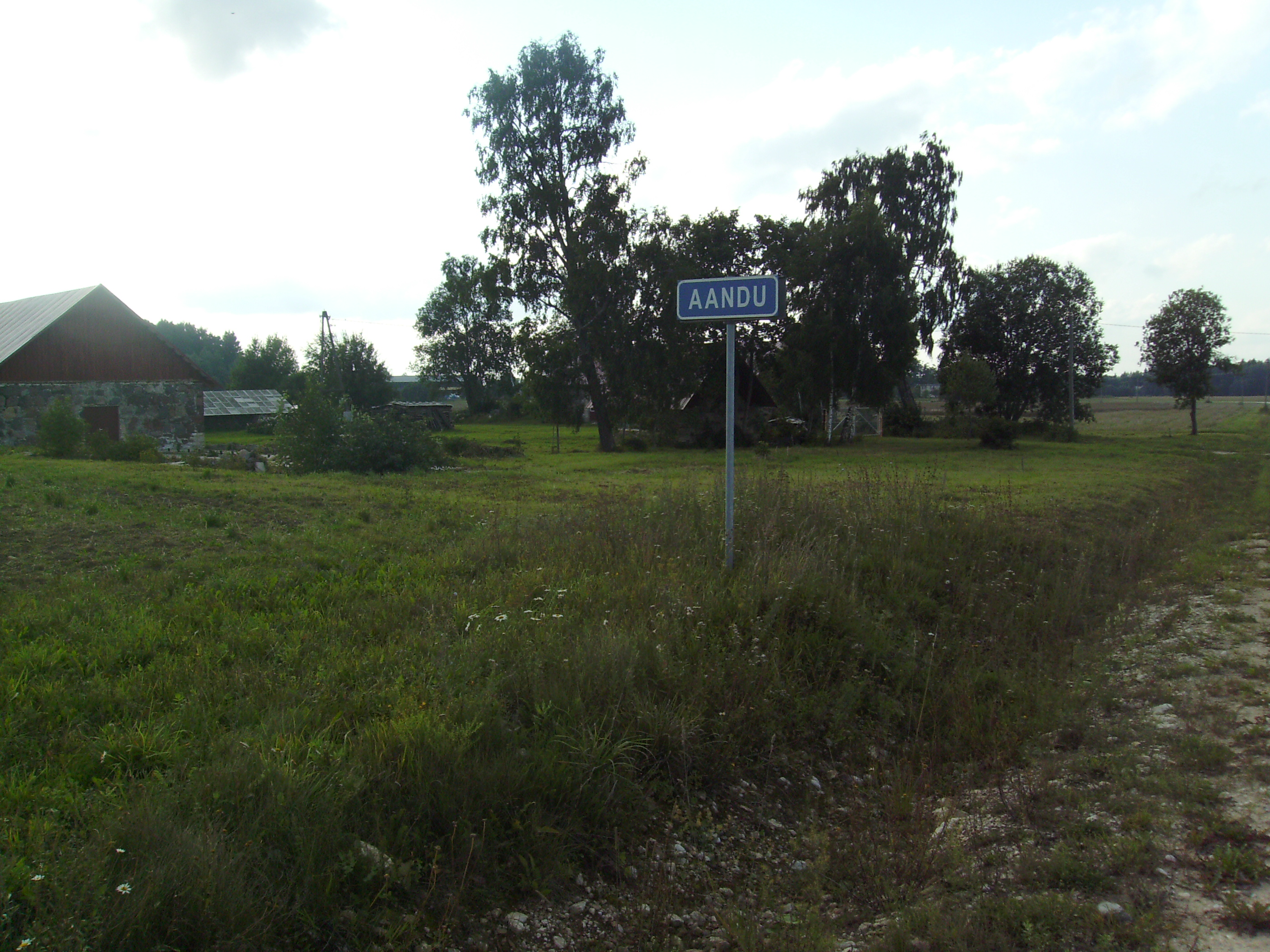
- Interactive map of Aandu
- Country: Estonia
- County: Rapla County
- Parish: Kohila Parish

Population (2008)
  - Total: 55
- Time zone: UTC+2 (EET)
  - Summer (DST): UTC+3 (EEST)

Aandu is a village in Kohila Parish, Rapla County in northwestern Estonia.
