= Mälivere =

Village in Estonia

Coordinates: 59°07′N 24°48′E

- Village
- Interactive map of Mälivere
- Country: Estonia
- County: Rapla County
- Parish: Kohila Parish
- Time zone: UTC+2 (EET)
  - Summer (DST): UTC+3 (EEST)

Mälivere is a village in Kohila Parish, Rapla County in northwestern Estonia.
