= Kohila Parish =

Municipality of Estonia (2002-)

Coordinates: 59°10′5″N 24°45′27″E

Kohila Parish Kohila vald
- Municipality of Estonia
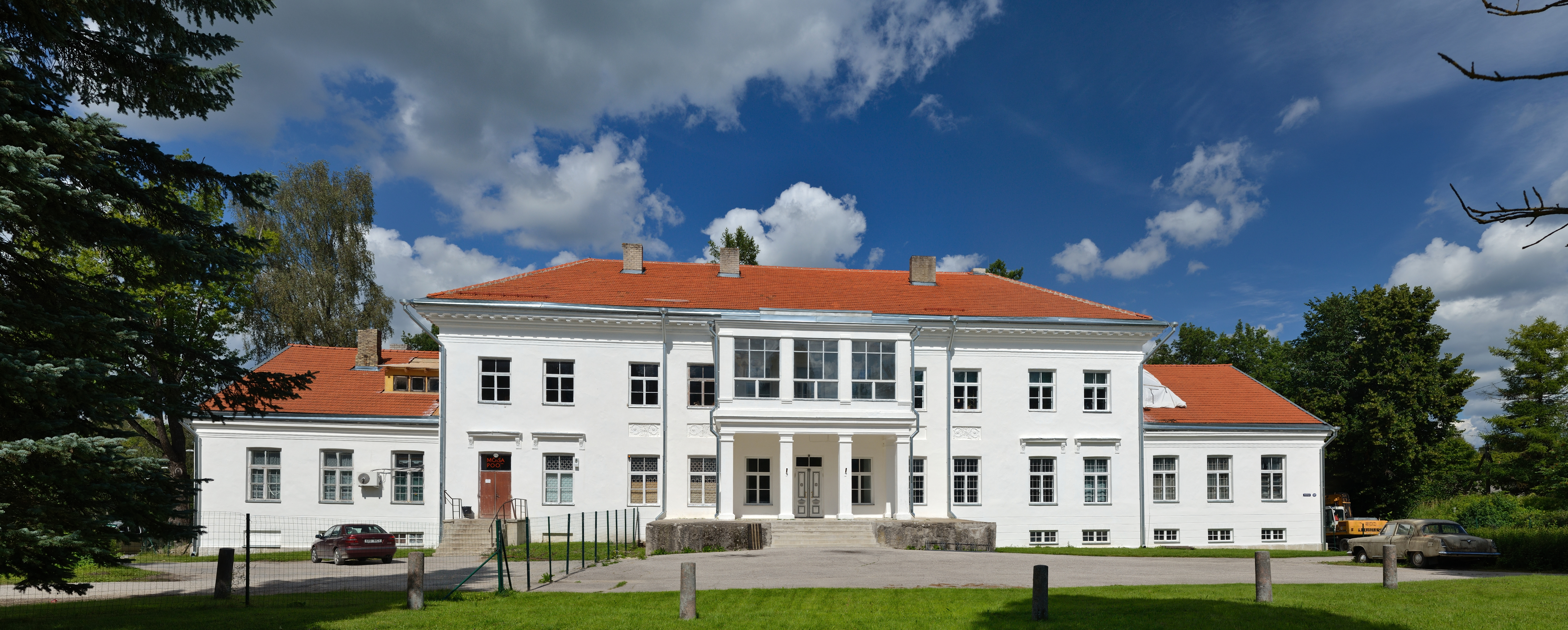
- Kohila manor

- Flag Coat of arms

- Kohila Parish within Rapla County.
- Country: Estonia
- County: Rapla County
- Administrative centre: Kohila

Government
  - Mayor: Margus Miller (Minu Kohila)

Area
  - Total: 230.20 km^{2} (88.88 sq mi)

Population (01.01.2009)
  - Total: 5,925
  - Density: 25.74/km^{2} (66.66/sq mi)
- ISO 3166 code: EE-317
- Website: www.kohila.ee

Kohila Parish (Estonian: Kohila vald) is the northernmost municipality of Rapla County, Estonia. It has a population of 5,925 (as of 1 January 2009) and an area of 230.20 km (143.04 mi).

== Settlements ==
Borough

Kohila

Small boroughs

Aespa - Hageri - Prillimäe

Villages

Aandu - Adila - Angerja - Hageri - Kadaka - Lohu - Loone - Lümandu - Masti - Mälivere - Pahkla - Pihali - Pukamäe - Põikma - Rabivere - Rootsi - Salutaguse - Sutlema - Urge - Vana-Aespa - Vilivere

The administrative centre of Kohila Parish is Kohila borough (alev) with population 3,505 (as of 1 January 2006). It is situated 33 km south to Estonia's capital, Tallinn and 22 km north to county's administrative center Rapla.

== Religion ==
The religious landscape of Kohila Parish is predominantly secular, with 80.9% of the population identifying as unaffiliated with any religion.

Among those who do associate with a faith, 9.3% identify as Lutheran, reflecting the historical presence of Lutheranism in the region. The Orthodox community constitutes 6.1%, while other Christian denominations collectively make up 2.5% of the population.

A smaller segment of the population, 0.5%, follows other religions, while 0.7% of individuals did not specify their religious affiliation or it remains unknown.

This data highlights the diverse yet largely non-religious nature of the community in Kohila Parish.

Religion in Kohila Parish (2021)
1. Unaffiliated (80.9%)
2. Lutheran (9.30%)
3. Orthodox (6.10%)
4. Others Christians (2.50%)
5. Others Religions (0.50%)
6. Unknown (0.70%)

== Local government ==
Current chairman of the council (volikogu esimees) is Margus Miller from the electoral coalition "Minu Kohila".

Current mayor (vallavanem) is Andrus Saare from the Union of Pro Patria and Res Publica.

== Gallery ==
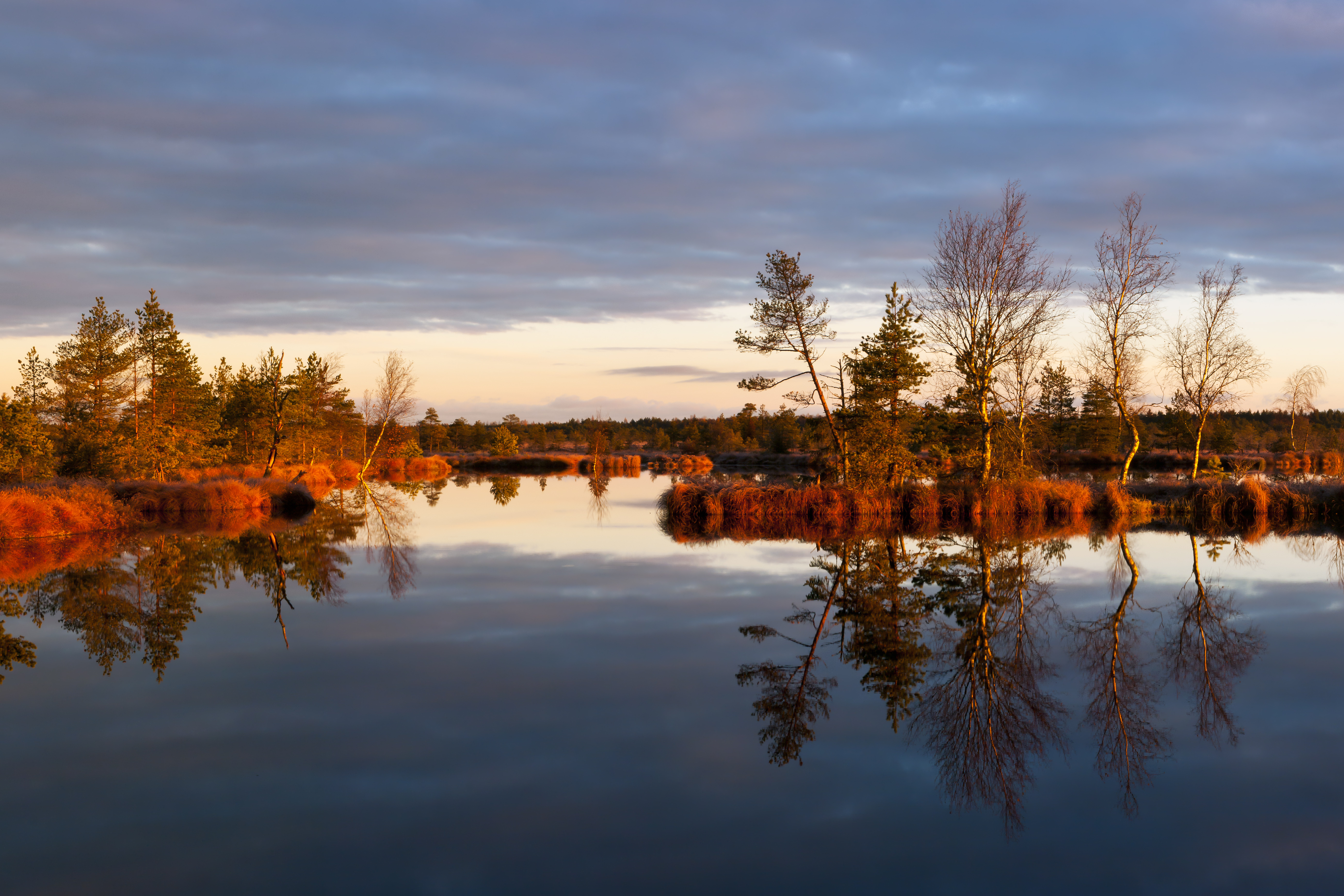
Lake Kaselaug in Rabivere nature reserve

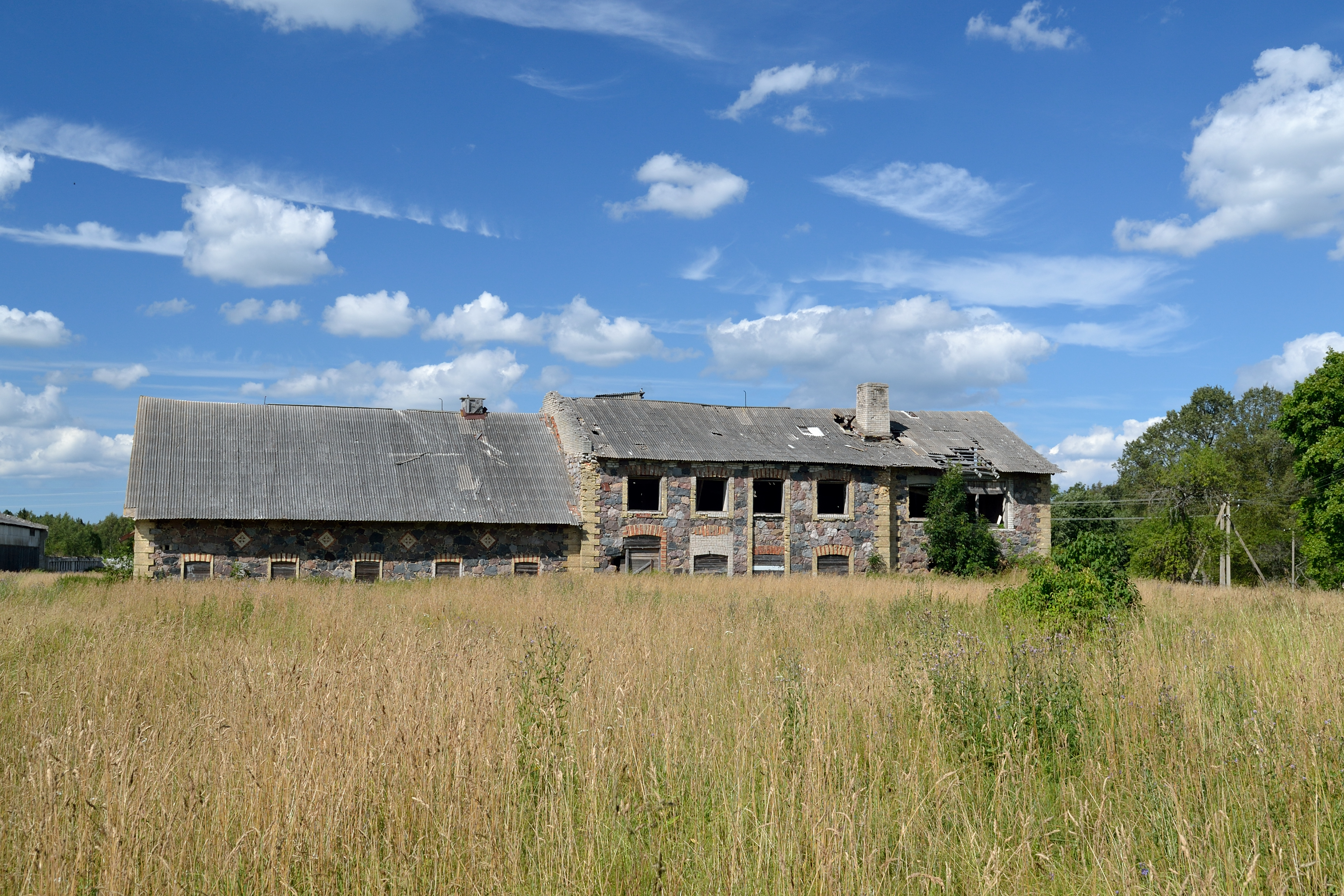
Ruins of Sutlema manor distillery

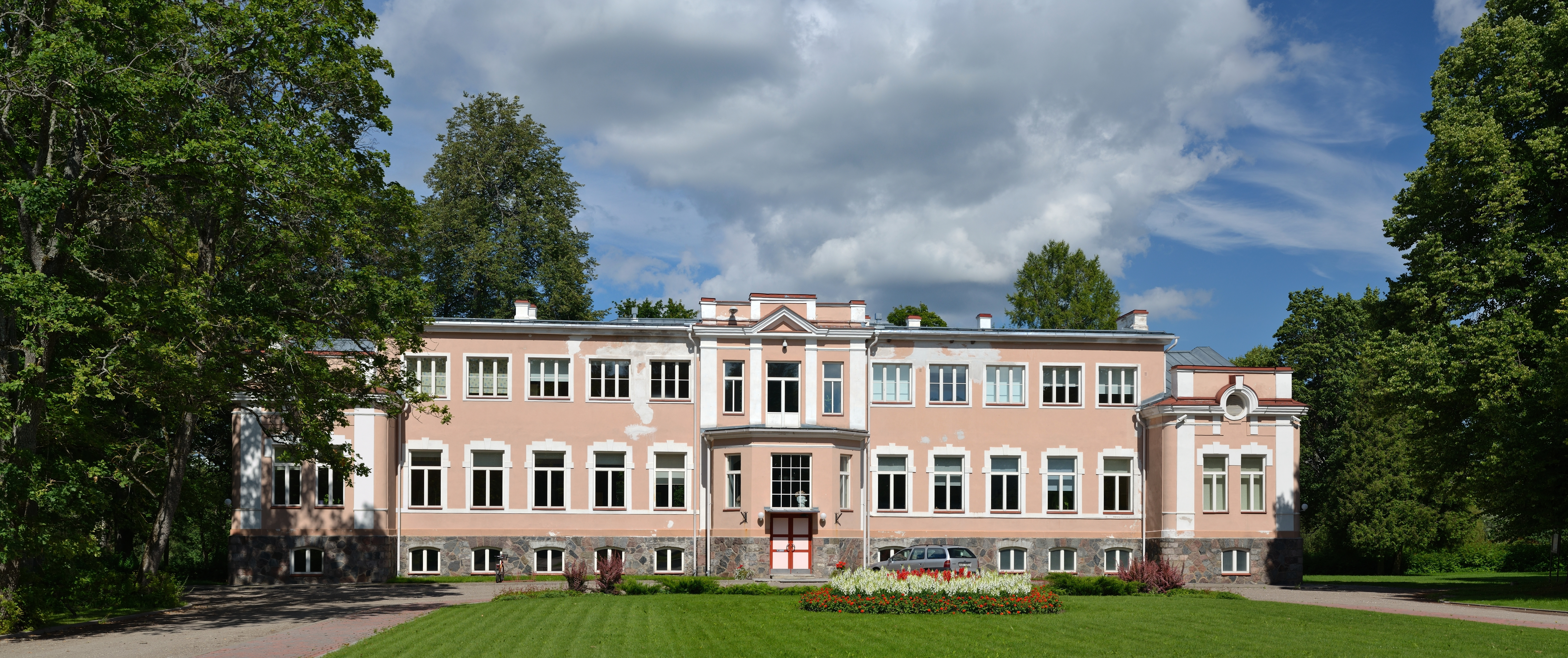
Tohisoo manor main building

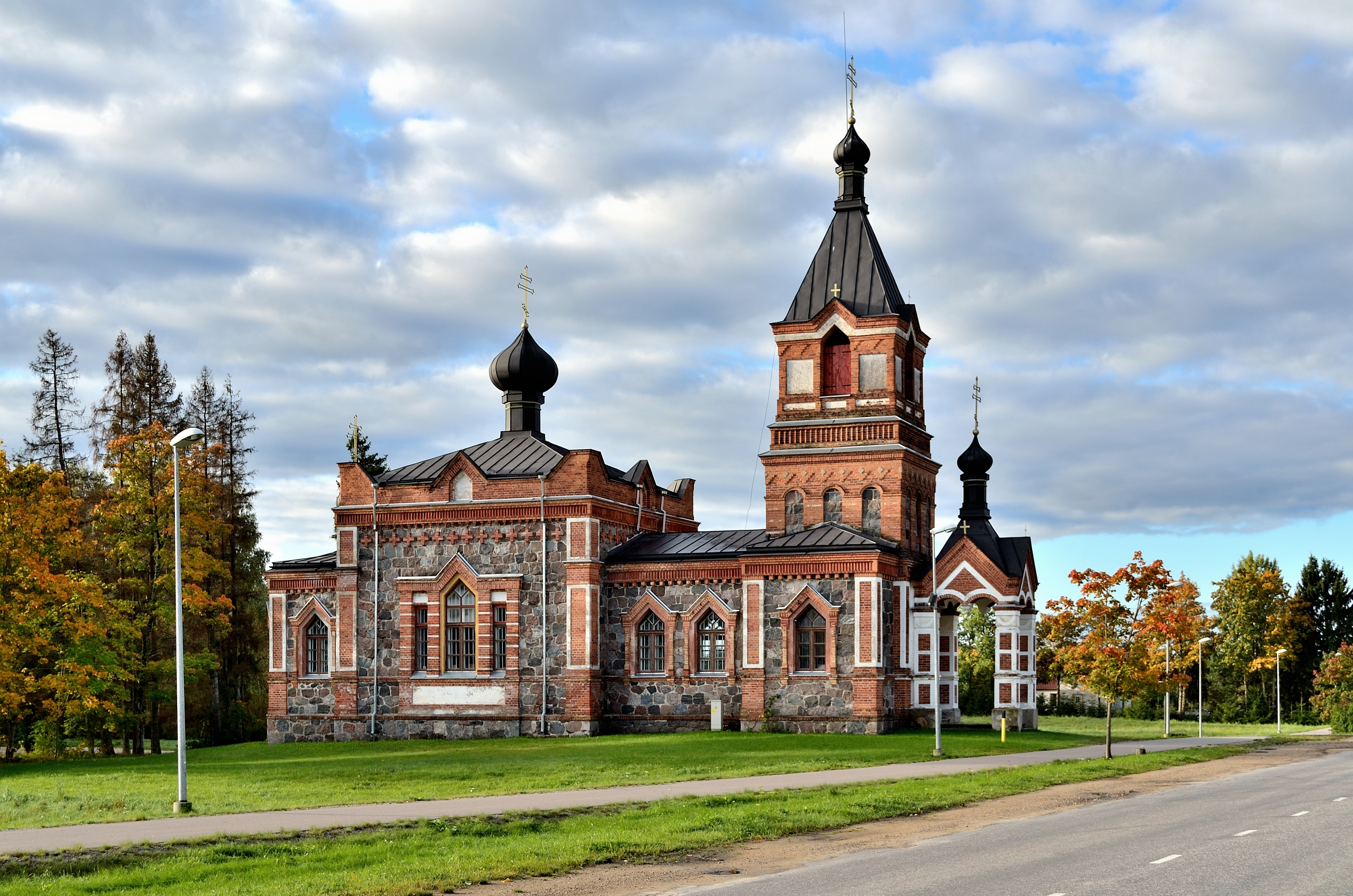
Kohila church

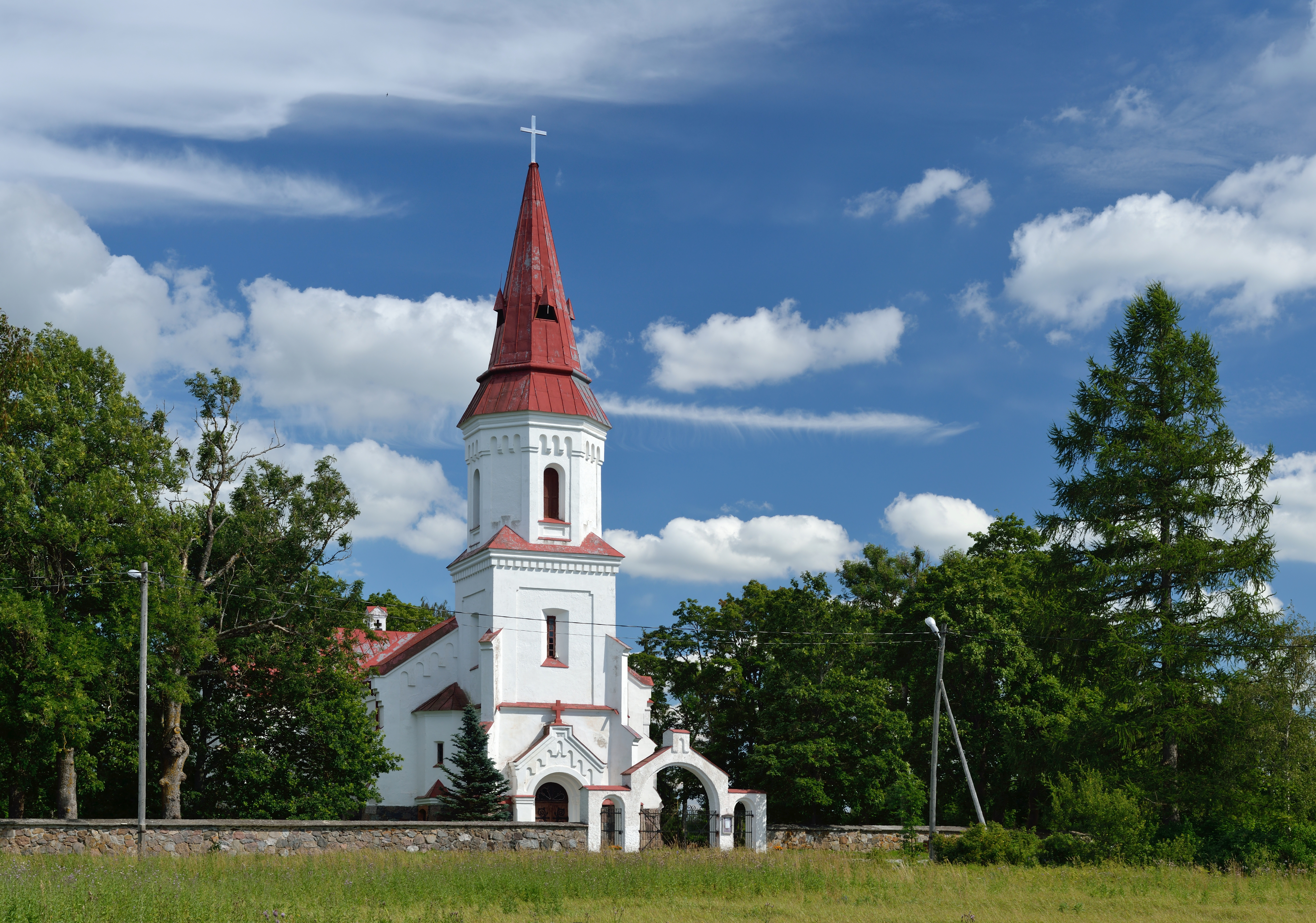
Hageri church

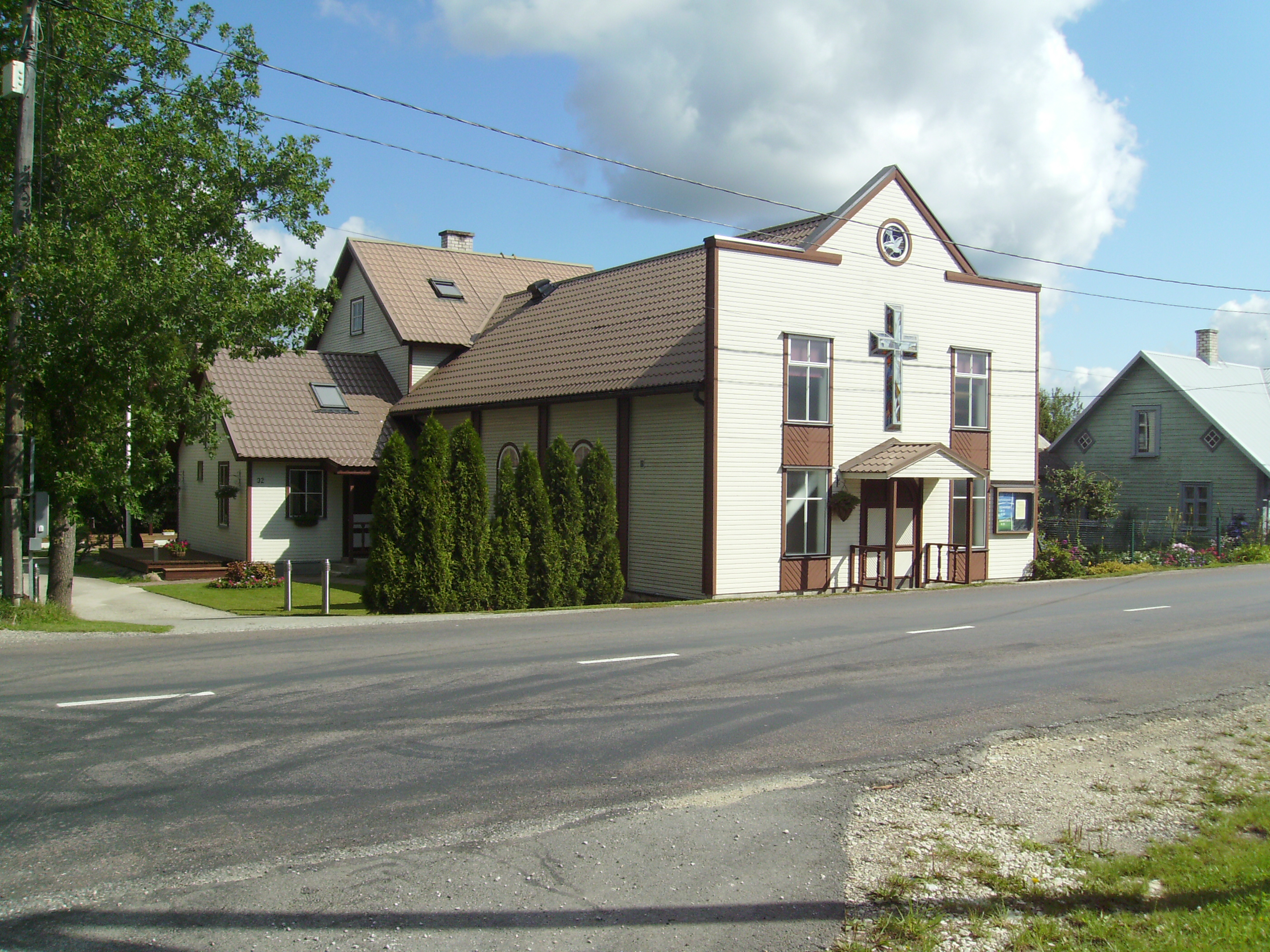
Baptist Church of Kohila

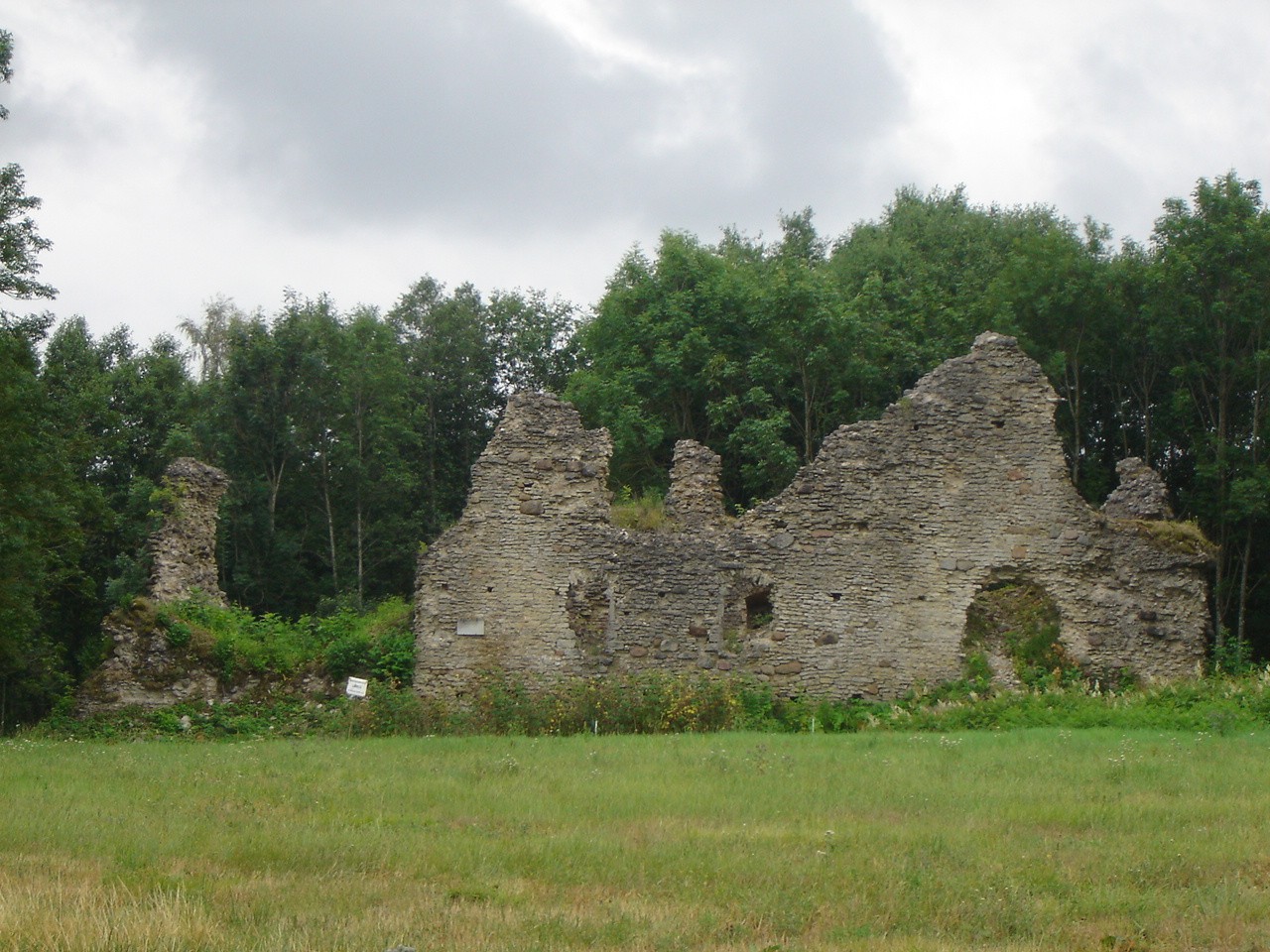
Ruins of Angerja vassal castle

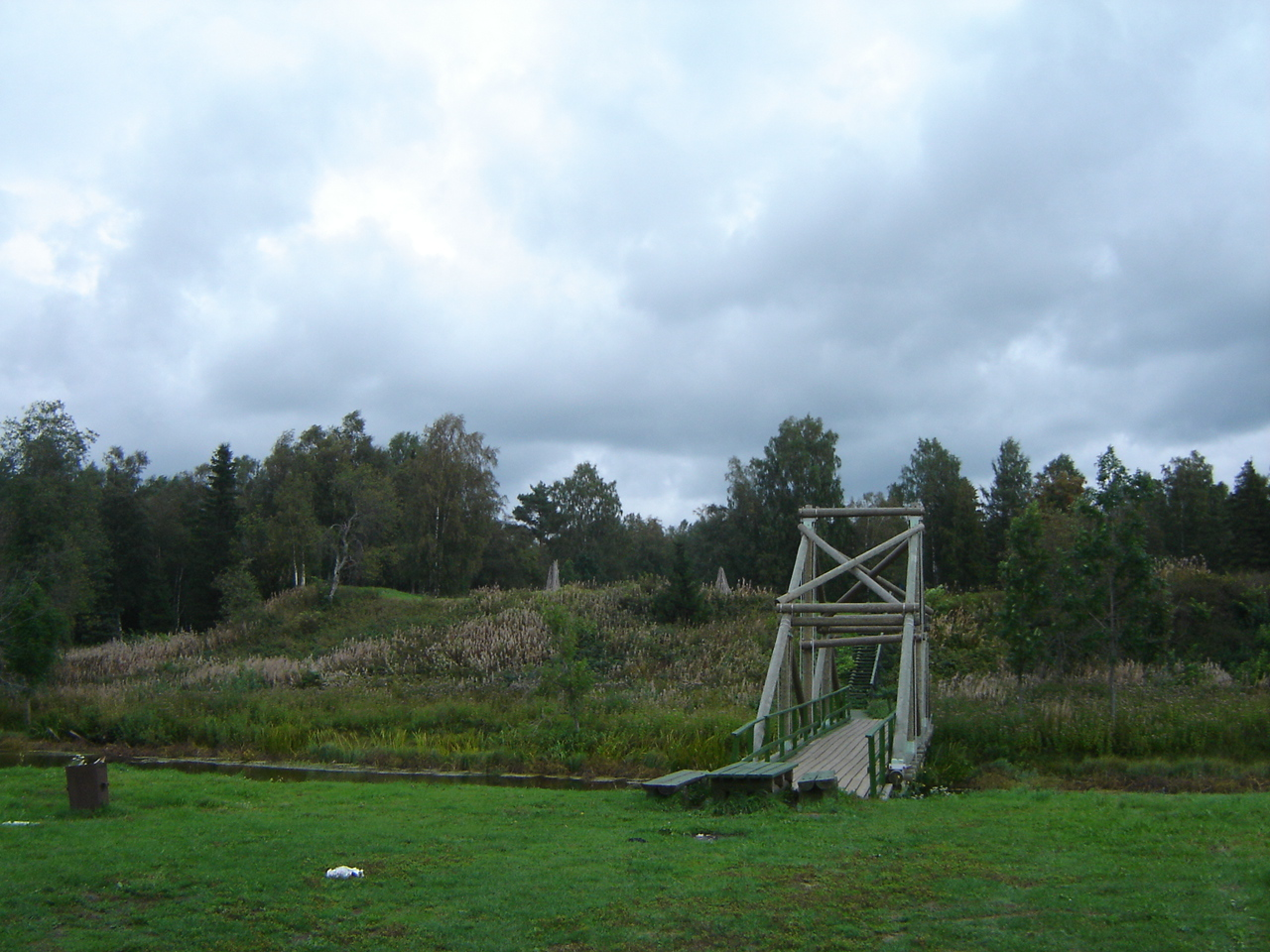
Lohu hill forts

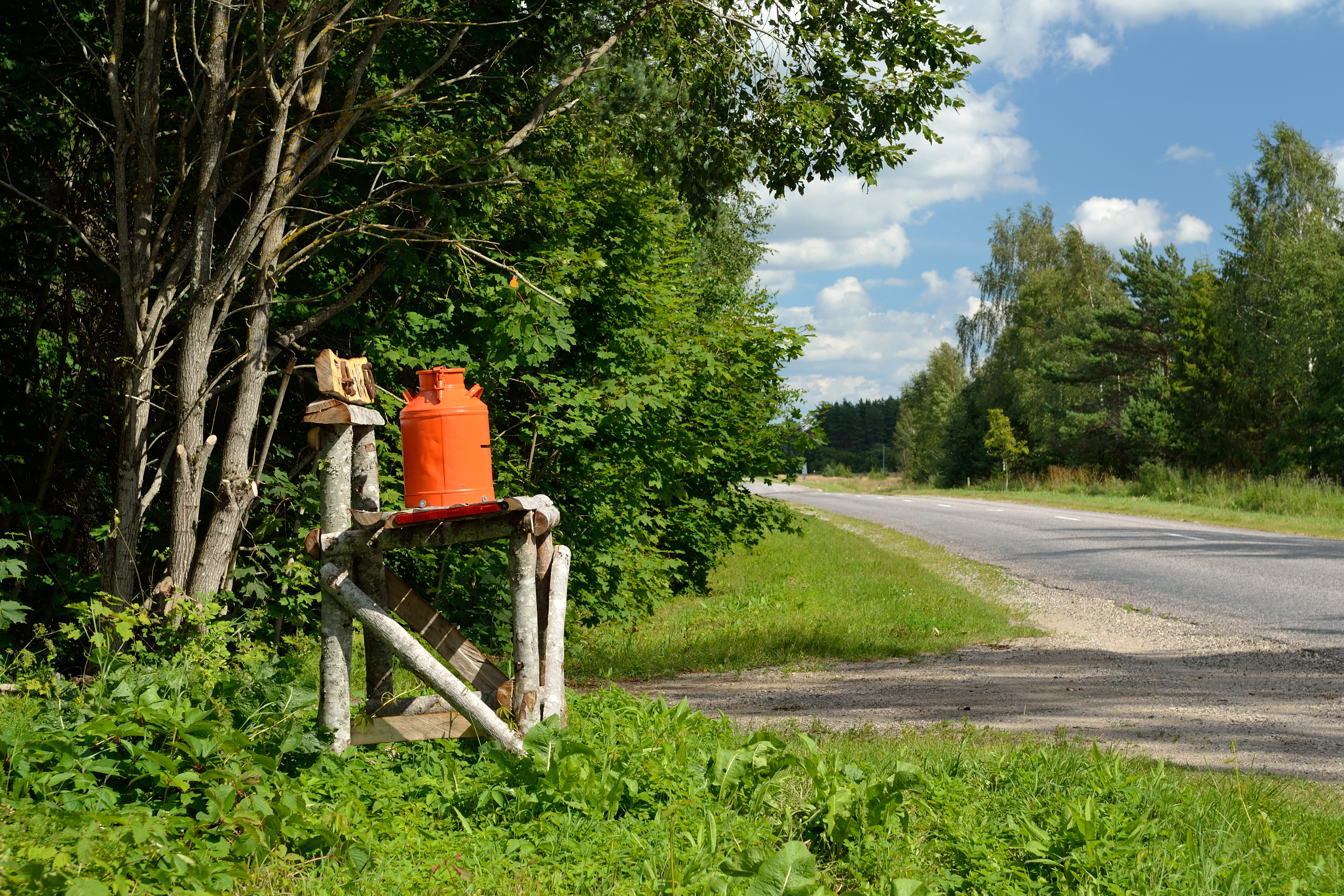
Milk churn stand

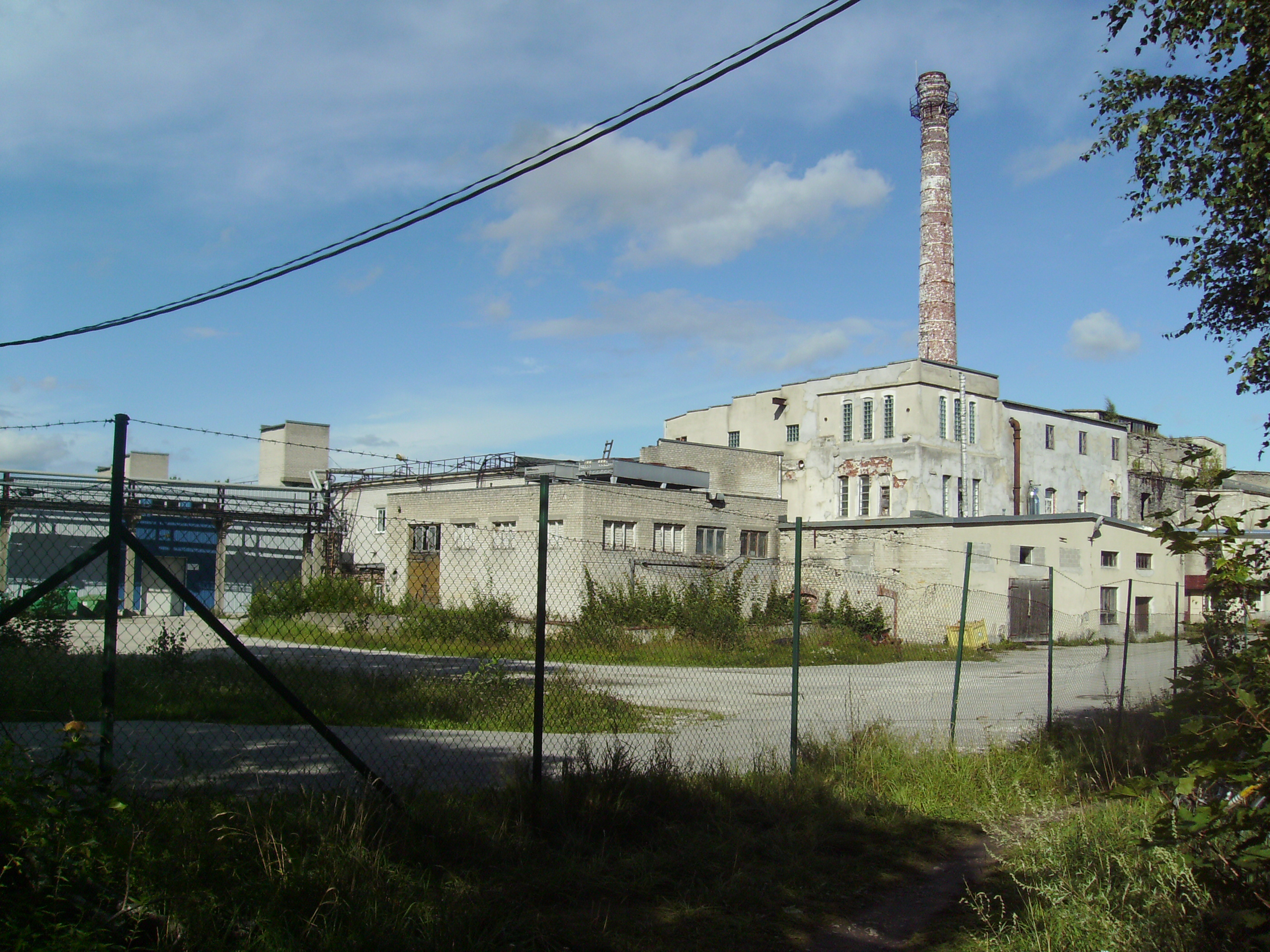
Kohila paper factory

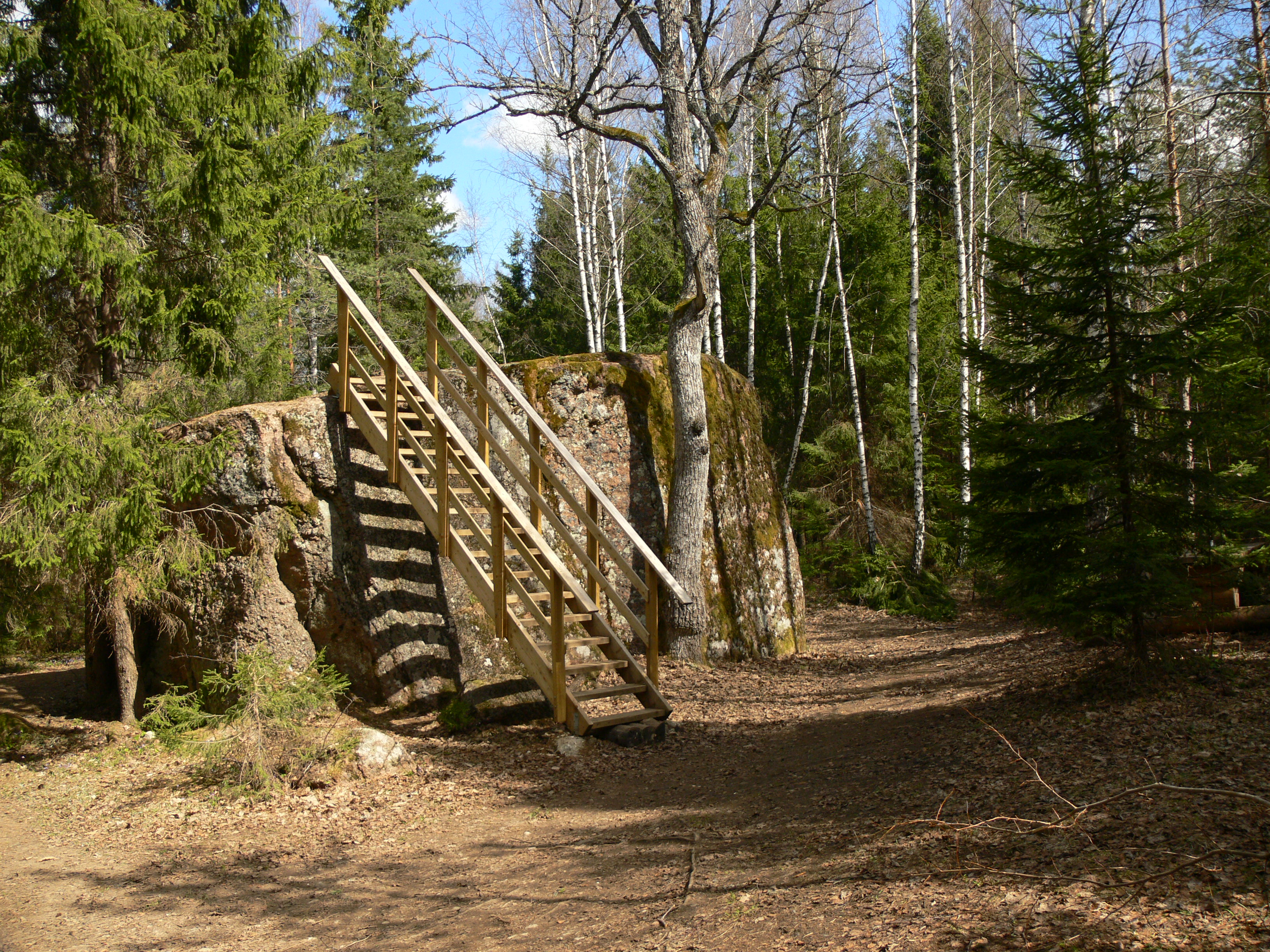
Pahkla glacial erratic

== Notable people ==
- Otto Friedrich Ignatius (1794 in Hageri – 1824), a Baltic German painter, writer and composer.
- Betty Kuuskemaa (1879 in Hageri – 1966), stage and film actress
- Theodor Altermann (1885 in Pahkla – 1915), actor, theatre director and producer.
- Aleksander Pallas (1887 in Hageri – 1939), lawyer, politician; the acting deputy mayor of Tallinn in 1917.
- Kuno Veeber (1898 in Adila – 1929), painter and graphic artist
- Alfred Schmidt (1898 in Hageri – 1972), featherweight weightlifter, silver medallist at the 1920 Summer Olympics
- Otto Pohla (1899 in Hageri – 1941), wrestler, competed as a Greco-Roman light heavyweight at the 1928 Summer Olympics
- Laine Mesikäpp (1917 in Adila – 2012), film, radio and stage actress; collected and catalogue Estonian folk music
- Andrus Saare (born 1965), politician, Mayor of Kohila Parish, 1999/2005, and 2009 to 2011.
- Martti Helde (born 1987 in Rootsi), film director and screenwriter.
