= Salutaguse, Rapla County =

Village in Estonia

Coordinates: 59°10′14″N 24°48′45″E

Salutaguse
- Village
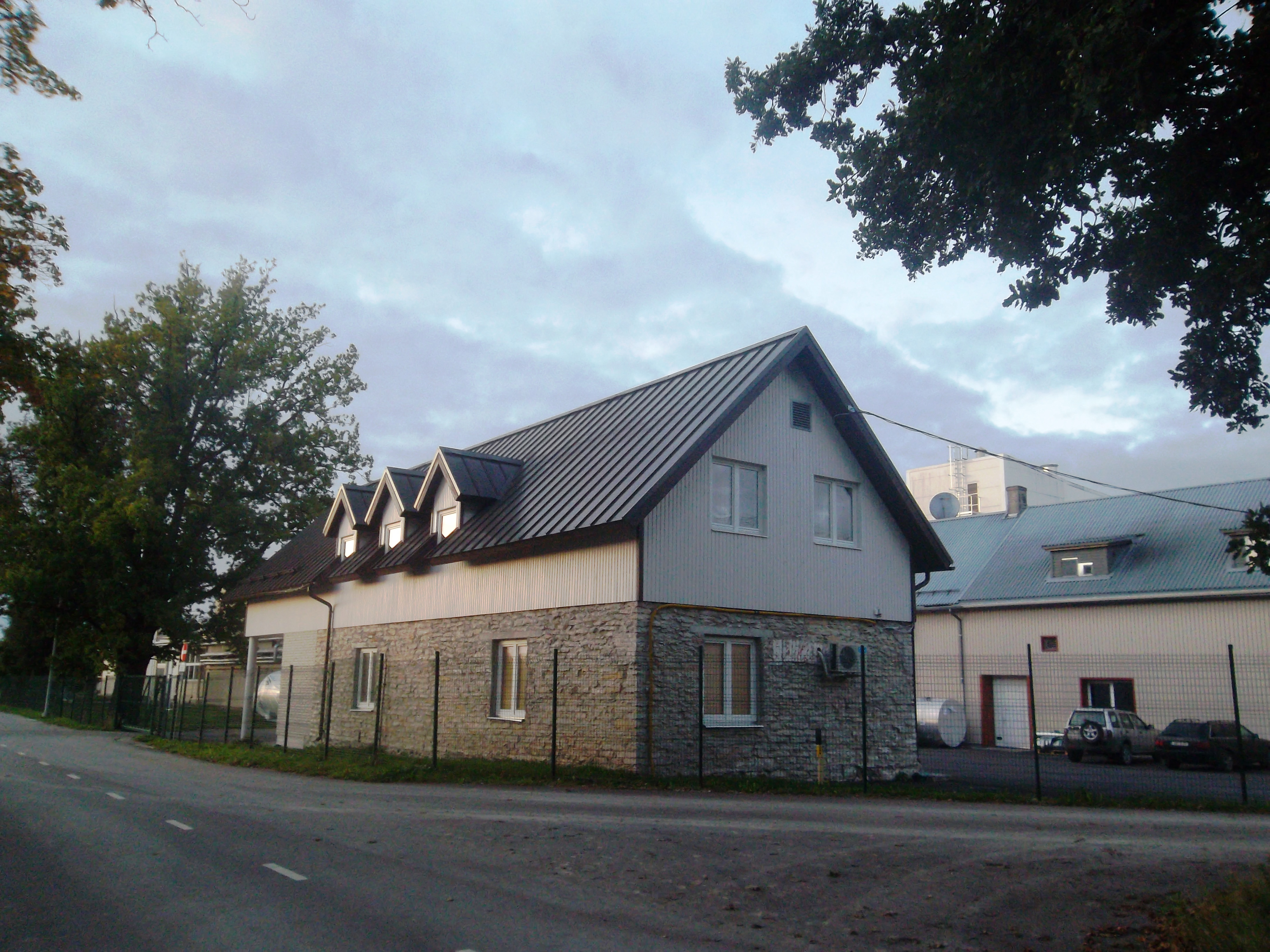
- Salutaguse Yeast Factory main building.
- Interactive map of Salutaguse
- Country: Estonia
- County: Rapla County
- Parish: Kohila Parish
- Time zone: UTC+2 (EET)
  - Summer (DST): UTC+3 (EEST)

Salutaguse is a village in Kohila Parish, Rapla County in northwestern Estonia.

Salutaguse is the location of the only yeast factory in Estonia, Salutaguse Yeast Factory. It was established in 1930 in the Salutaguse Manor.

It has a population of 204 people in 2021 and a land area of 10.14 km^{2}.
