= Urge, Rapla County =

Village in Estonia

Coordinates: 59°10′55″N 24°46′46″E

Urge
- Village
- Interactive map of Urge
- Country: Estonia
- County: Rapla County
- Parish: Kohila Parish

Population
  - Total: 179
- Time zone: UTC+2 (EET)
  - Summer (DST): UTC+3 (EEST)

Urge is a village in Kohila Parish, Rapla County in northwestern Estonia.
