= Rootsi, Rapla County =

Village in Estonia

Coordinates: 59°09′N 24°44′E

Rootsi
- Village
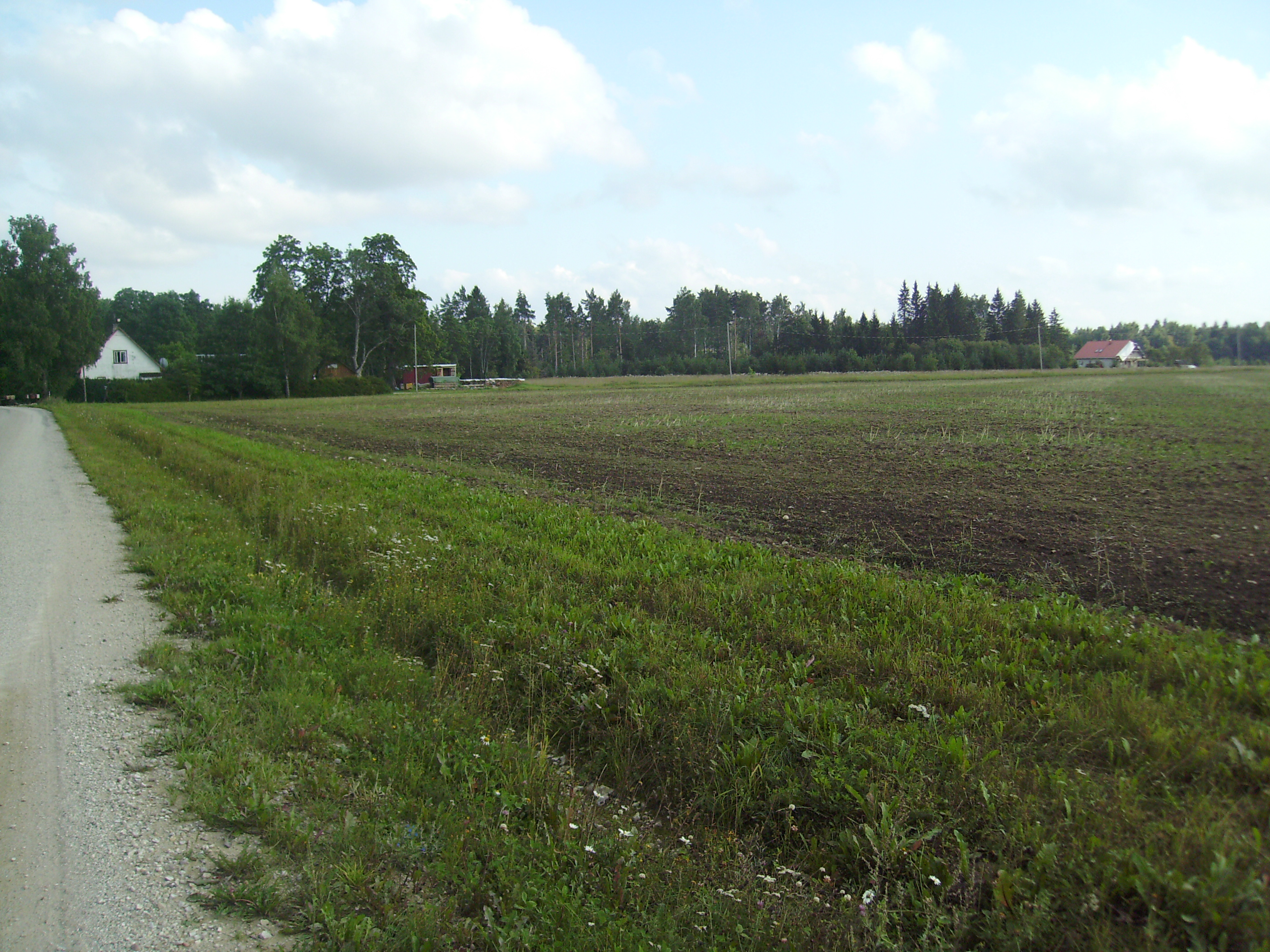
- Interactive map of Rootsi
- Country: Estonia
- County: Rapla
- Parish: Kohila
- Time zone: UTC+2 (EET)
  - Summer (DST): UTC+3 (EEST)

Rootsi is a village in Kohila Parish, Rapla County in northwestern Estonia. This village has a modest population, which has grown slightly over recent years. The census data shows an increase from 26 residents in 2000 to 39 by 2021.
