= Milk churn stand =

Raised platform for milk churns

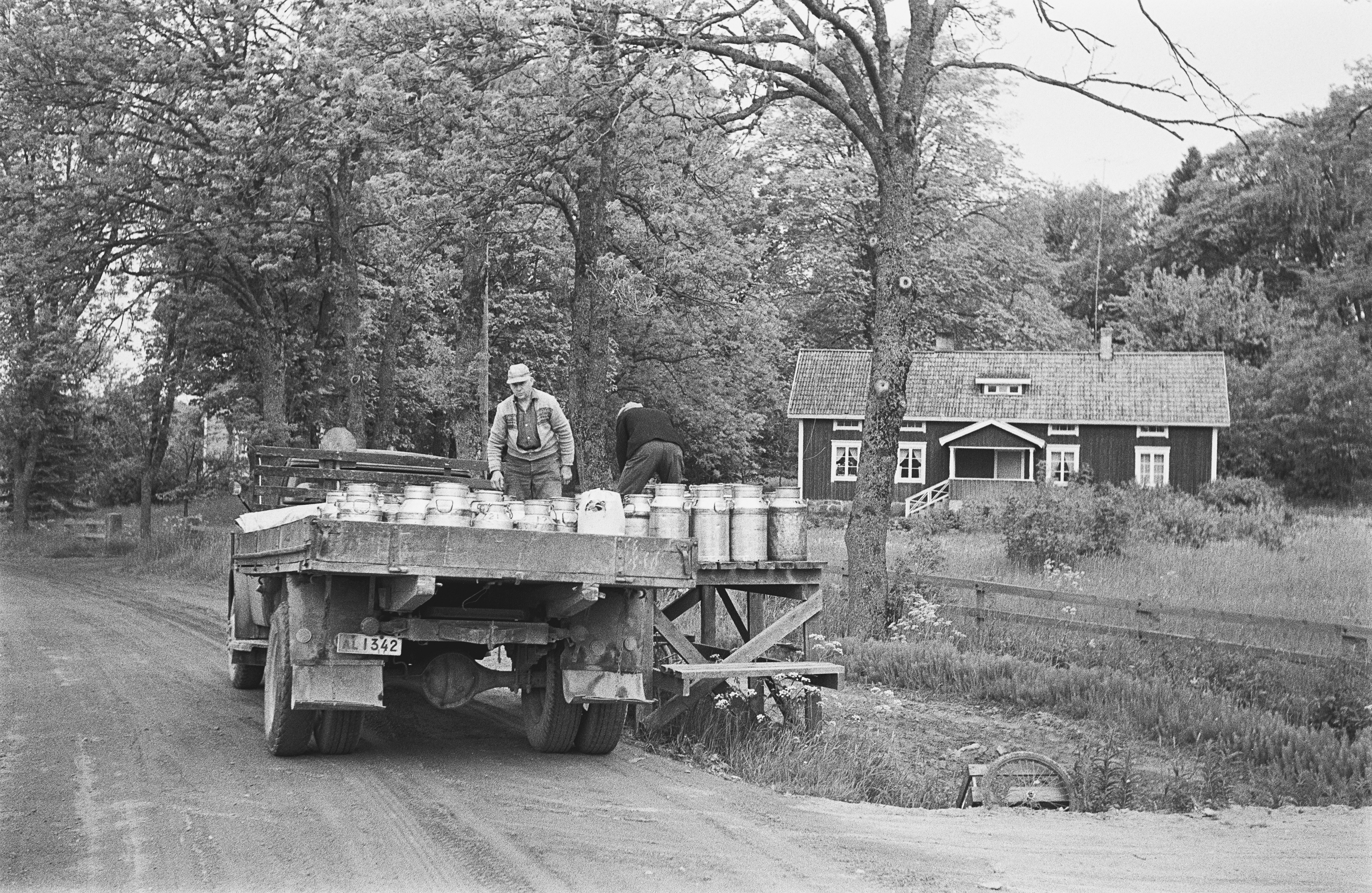
Milk churns being loaded from a stand onto a lorry in Pålsböle, Åland, in the 1960s.

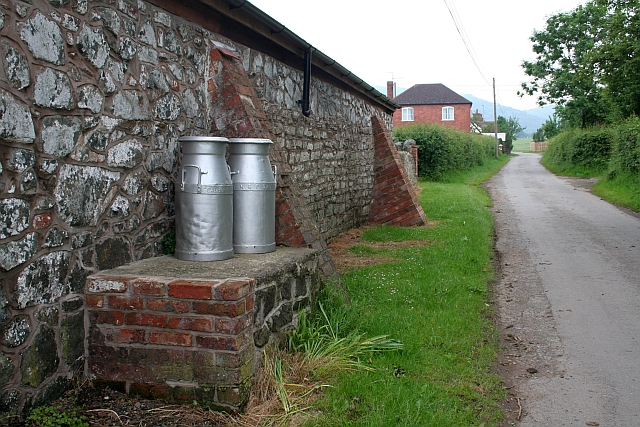
Milk churn stand with churns

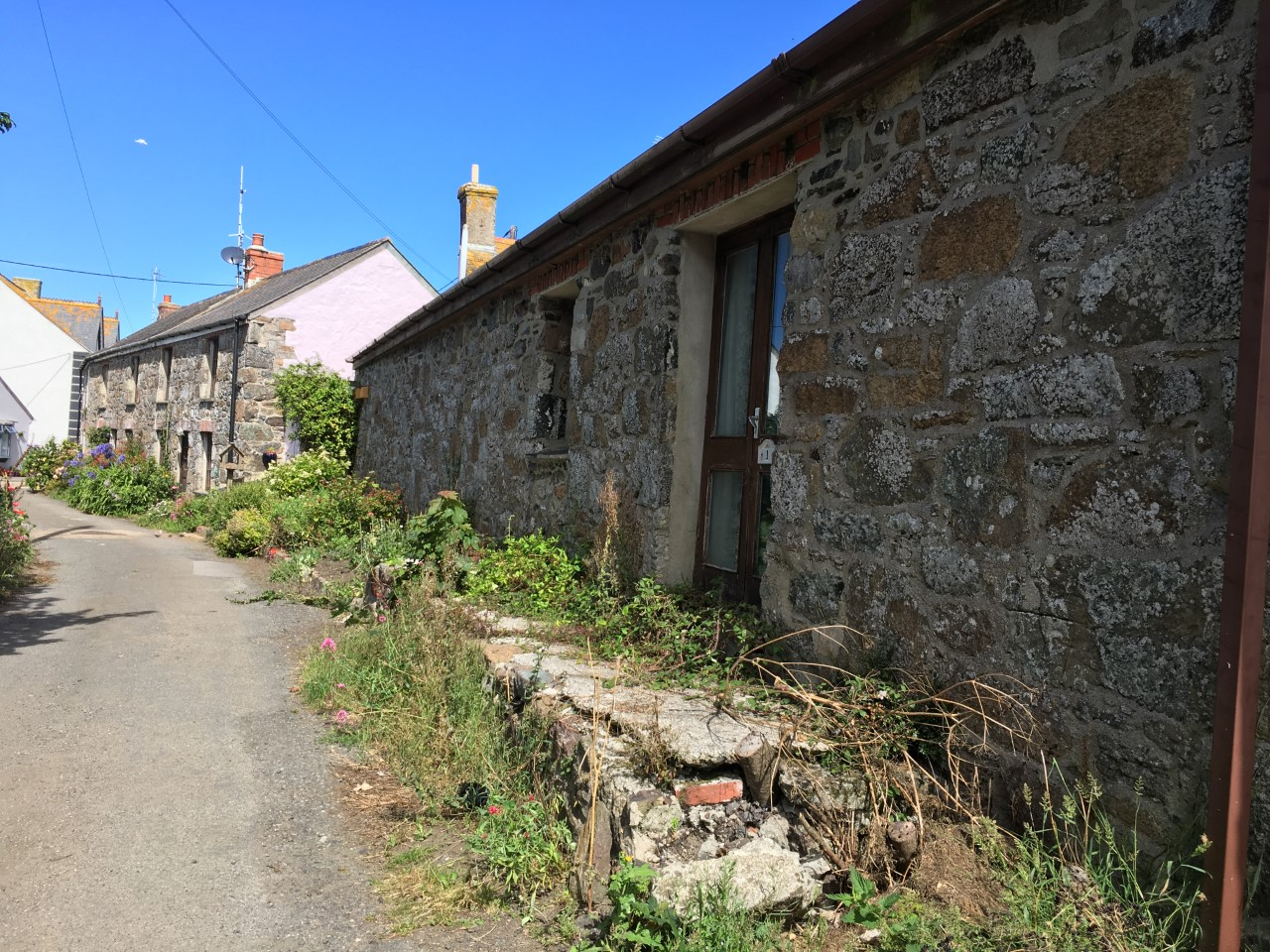
Cornish milk churn stand before restoration

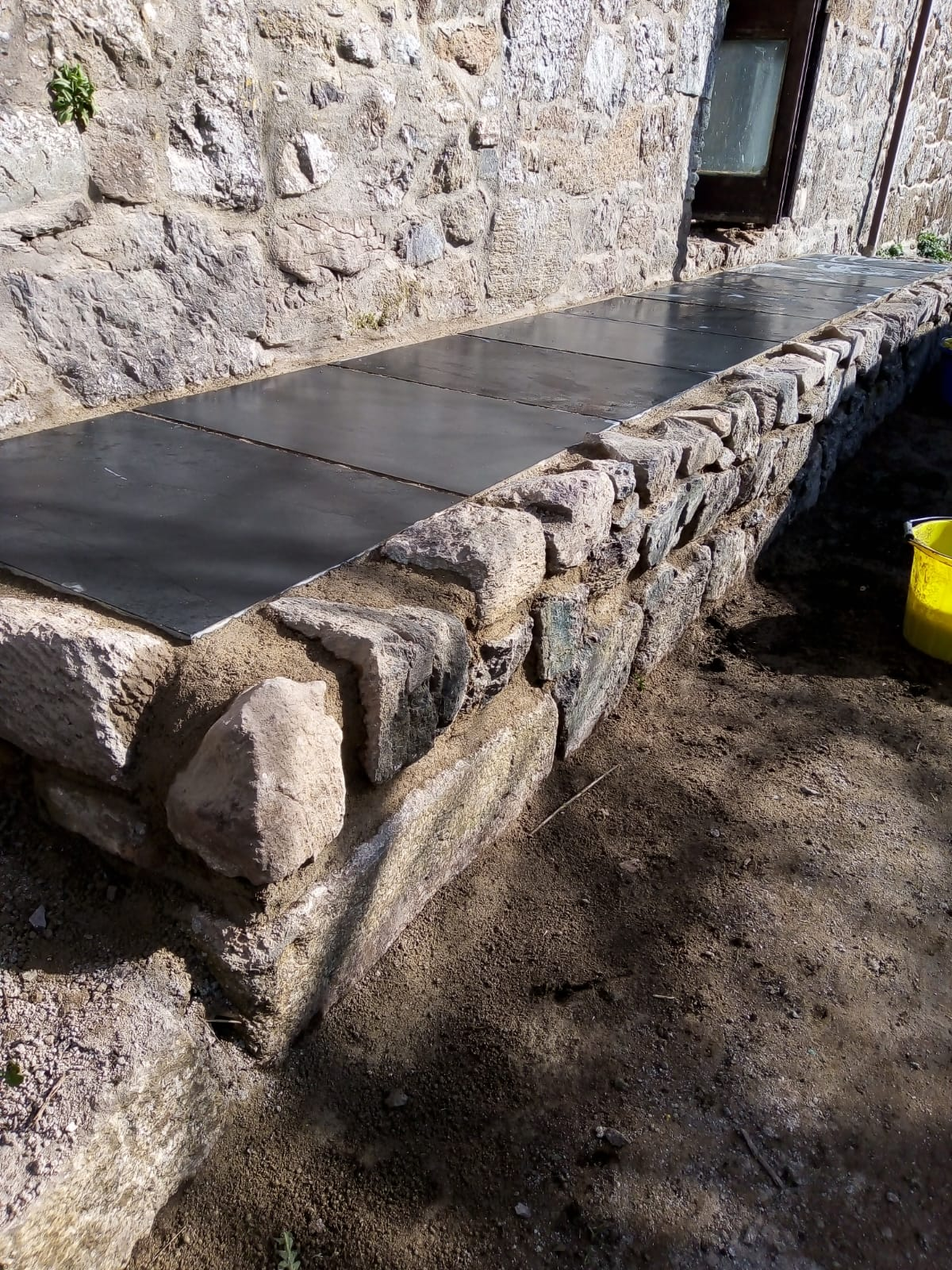
Cornish milk churn stand restored

A milk churn stand was a standard-height platform on which milk churns would be placed for collection by cart or lorry. Some were simple and made of wood, but the majority were built from stone or concrete blocks. They were once a common roadside sight in Britain in areas which carried out dairy farming, but collection of milk churns from stands ceased in Britain in 1979. Many have survived, some being renovated to commemorate the practice, while others have been dismantled or left to decay.

== Description ==
Milk churn stands could be made of wood, or were more permanent structures built from concrete or stone blocks. Many were simple cubic structures. Some had steps leading up to them, or just a foot hole to reach the platform while some could be considerably more elaborate. The simple purpose of the stand was to facilitate collection of milk churns by cart or lorry and so were built at a convenient height for easy transfer. A conical 15 imperial gallons (68 L) churn weighing 20 pounds (9.1 kg) would weigh 170 pounds (77 kg) full. A later, standard, and lighter churn might contain 11 imperial gallons (50 L), of milk, weighing about 120 pounds (54 kg) full. Once the full churns had been removed they were replaced by the haulier with empty ones for refilling by the next collection time. The full churns would then be transported directly by road to the dairy, or indirectly by rail.

The origin of the milk churn stand probably dates back at least into the 19th century when commercial trade in milk became widespread, dairies became larger enterprises and widespread distribution was facilitated by rail and improving road networks.

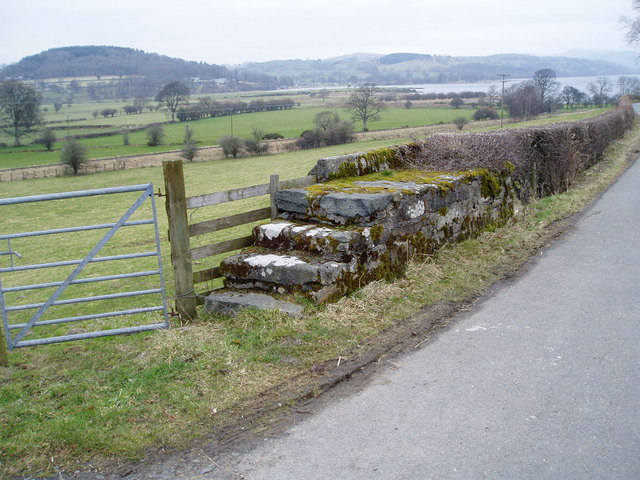
Milk churn stand with steps

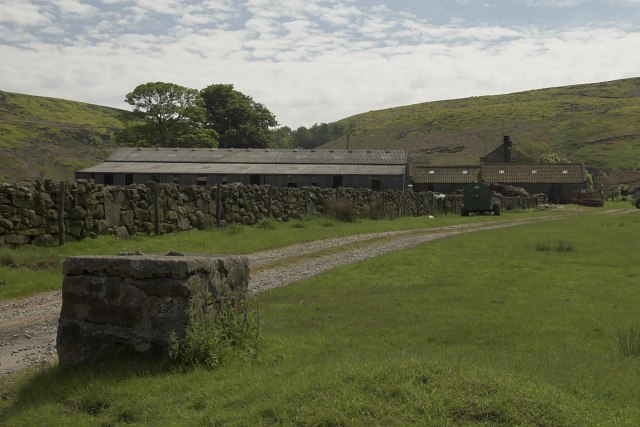
Simple milk churn stand

== Cessation ==
In the United Kingdom churn collection ceased in 1970 and all milk was collected by tanker; thus, the stands were no longer needed.

== Fate ==
Many milk churn stands would have been lost during road improvement schemes owing to their proximity to the roadside but many were left in situ to slowly decay; thus there are few original wooden examples. However, many made from more durable materials such as concrete or stone have survived and can be seen throughout the country and, indeed, in other countries. Some have been renovated as reminders of the former widespread practice, while some replica stands have been erected for the same reason in stone (such as the example at Wadenhoe) and the reinstatement or removal of some has even been the subject of planning application. Some milk churn stands have been recorded as historical monuments by regional bodies and the National Archives.

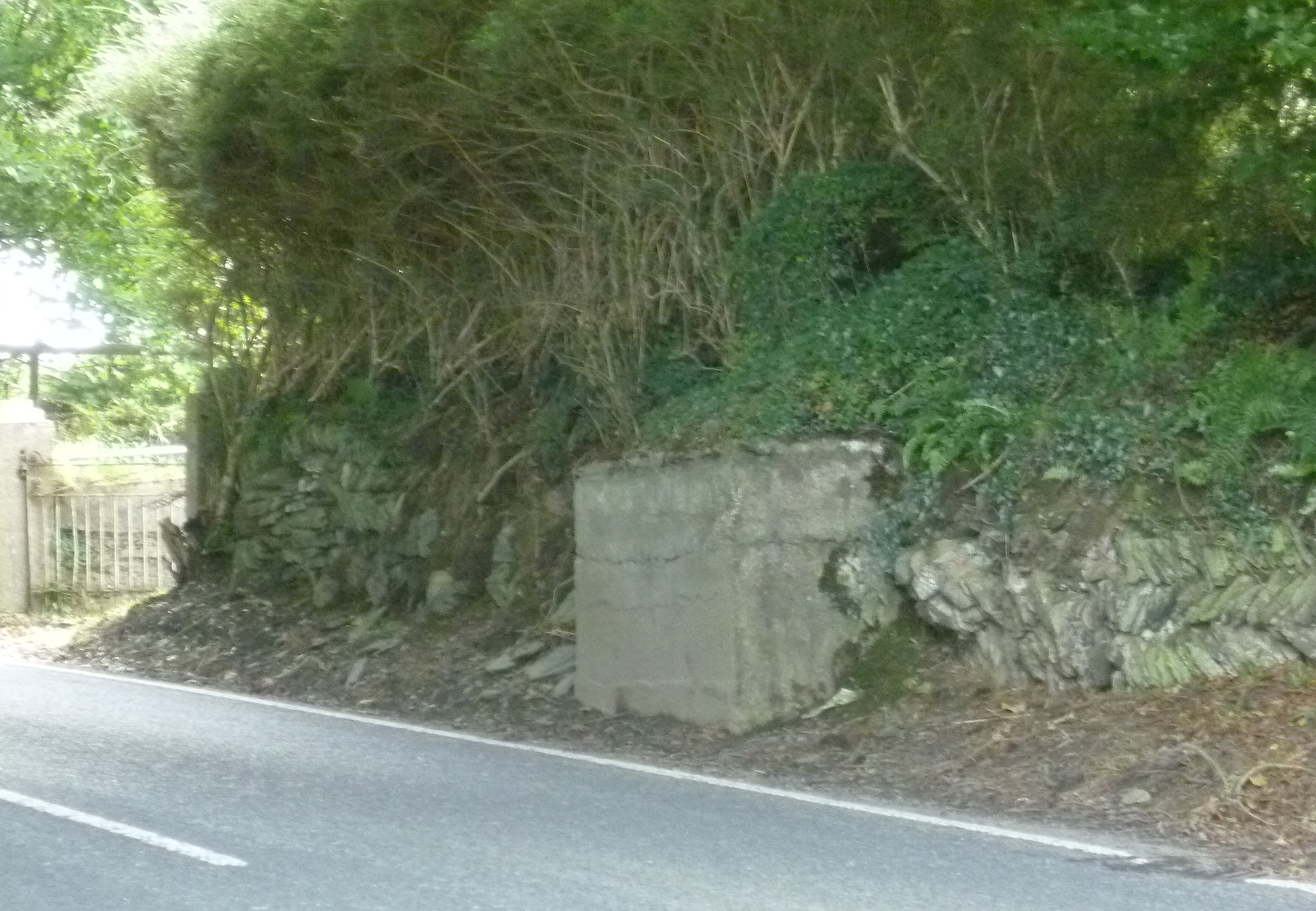
Forgotten milk churn stand

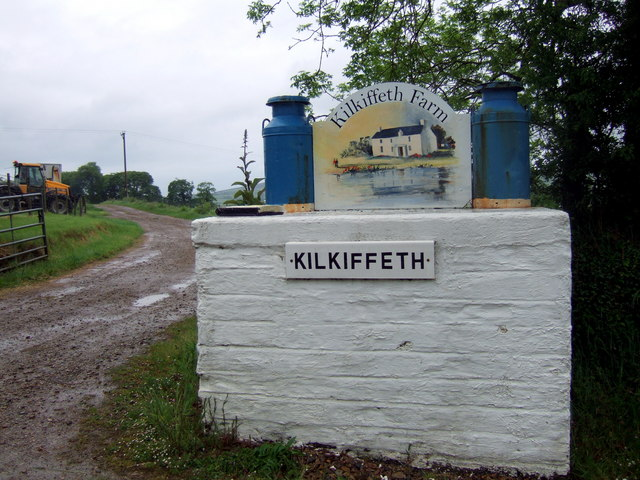
A milk churn stand as a feature
