= Kalda =

Kalda may refer to:

== Places in Estonia ==
- Kalda, Pärnu County, a village in Saarde Parish, Pärnu County
- Kalda, Rapla County, a village in Rapla Parish, Rapla County

== People with the surname ==
- Aino Kalda (born 1929), Estonian botanist and bryologist
- Erik Kalda (born 1969), Estonian journalist (:et)
- Helle Kalda (born 1950), Estonian politician
- Hillar Kalda (born 1932), Estonian physician and politician
- Madde Kalda (1903–1984), Estonian writer
- Maie Kalda (1929–2013), Estonian literary scientist and critic; see Letter of 40 intellectuals
- Piret Kalda (born 1966), Estonian actress
