= Aleksander Aberg =

Estonian wrestler (1881–1920)

Aleksander Richard Aberg
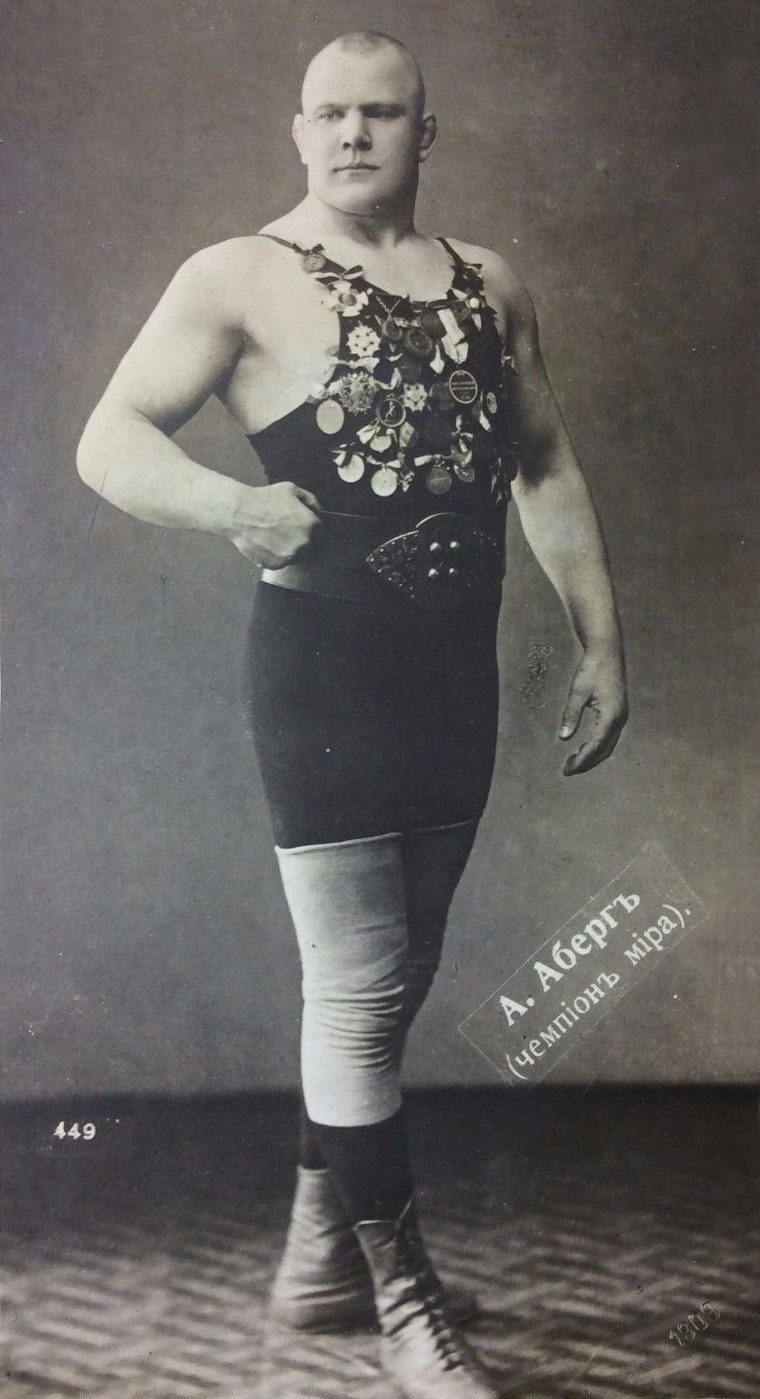
- Born: 11 August 1881; Kolga, Governorate of Estonia, Russian Empire
- Died: 15 February 1920 (aged 38); Armavir, Russia

Aleksander Richard Aberg (11 August [O.S. 30 July] 1881 – 15 February 1920) was an Estonian professional Greco-Roman and free-style wrestling world champion of the early 20th century. He took part in the World Heavyweight Championship and was one of the three most famous Estonian professional wrestlers, along with Georg Lurich and Georg Hackenschmidt.

== Biography ==
Aberg was born in Kolga Manor, Harju County, Governorate of Estonia, Russian Empire. He was of Estonian origin. He wrestled in North America (1913–14 and 1915–16) with mixed success. Together with Lurich he came back via Japan and China to Russia in 1917 and arrived in Estonia in autumn. They participated in a wrestling tournament in Tallinn that remained unfinished due to the approach of the German troops. The athletes went to Saint Petersburg and on to South Russia.

The war meant an end to work in Saint Petersburg and Moscow. As the war spread, the men had to move further inside Russia. They could stop only in a far corner of South Russia, Armavir, Kuban Oblast. Their aim was to leave Russia across the Black Sea by boat. The front reached them in 1920 and Armavir passed from hand to hand in battles several times, many perished. Warm winter brought on typhoid. Due to the war, medical aid was difficult to get. Lurich fell ill first and could not be rescued, dying on 22 January 1920. Aberg had also become infected but he managed to defeat the illness. Unfortunately he rushed his recovery, caught pneumonia, and died on February 15, 1920, in Armavir. The wrestlers were buried in one grave in Armavir German cemetery.

The international Aleksander Aberg Memorial in Greco-Roman wrestling has been held in Estonia since 1960.

== Championships and accomplishments ==
- International Professional Wrestling Hall of Fame
  - Class of 2022
