= Madde Kalda =

Estonian writer (1903-1984)

- Born: Magdalena Alavina; August 23, 1903; Põikma, Governorate of Estonia, Russian Empire
- Died: April 6, 1984 (aged 80); Väike-Maarja, then part of Estonian SSR, Soviet Union
- Occupation: Writer

Madde Kalda (until 1925 Magdalena Alavina, from 1925 to 1936 Magdalena Kalda, August 23 [O.S. August 10] 1903 – April 6, 1984) was an Estonian writer.

== Life ==
Madde Kalda was born in Põikma in the Governorate of Estonia in the Russian Empire. She was the daughter of the farmer Jaan Alavina (1862–1943) and Ann Alavina (née Kroll) (1874–1952). She attended the Hageri village school and the Hageri Educational Society School, which she graduated from in 1917. She worked as an assistant secretary in the municipal government of Kernu, Hageri, and Vao from 1923 to 1925, and then she was a housewife in Väike-Maarja. She was married to Johannes Kalda (1895–1938), and their daughter was the literary scholar Maie Kalda (1929–2013). From 1978 to 1981, she lived in the village of Tamse on the island of Muhu, and then once more in Väike-Maarja, where she also died.

== Literary work ==
In the 1978 Estonian Novel Competition (Estonian: Eesti romaanivõistlus), her work Vigalas Siberimaale (From the Vigala to Siberia) received honorable mention, and it was published in abridged form in 1981 under the title Seitse tähte taeva Sõelas (Seven Stars in Heaven's Sieve, an expression referring to the Pleides). It was a detailed and factually accurate story based on the author's mother's life story and family traditions, with an abundance of ethnographic material, about the life of the villagers and manor folk of Lääne County in the late 19th and early 20th centuries. The work was enthusiastically received.

== Awards ==
- 1979: honorable mention in the 1978 Estonian Novel Competition
- 1982: Eduard Vilde Literary Award (for Seitse tähte taeva Sõelas)
