= Raik (name) =

Raik is both a given name and a surname. Notable people with the name include:

- Raik Dittrich (born 1968), East German biathlete
- Raik Hannemann (born 1968), German swimmer
- Katri Raik (born 1967), Estonian politician
- Priit Raik (1948–2008), Estonian composer
