= Väike-Maarja Church =

Church building in Lääne-Viru County, Estonia

Coordinates: 59.1302°N 26.2495°E

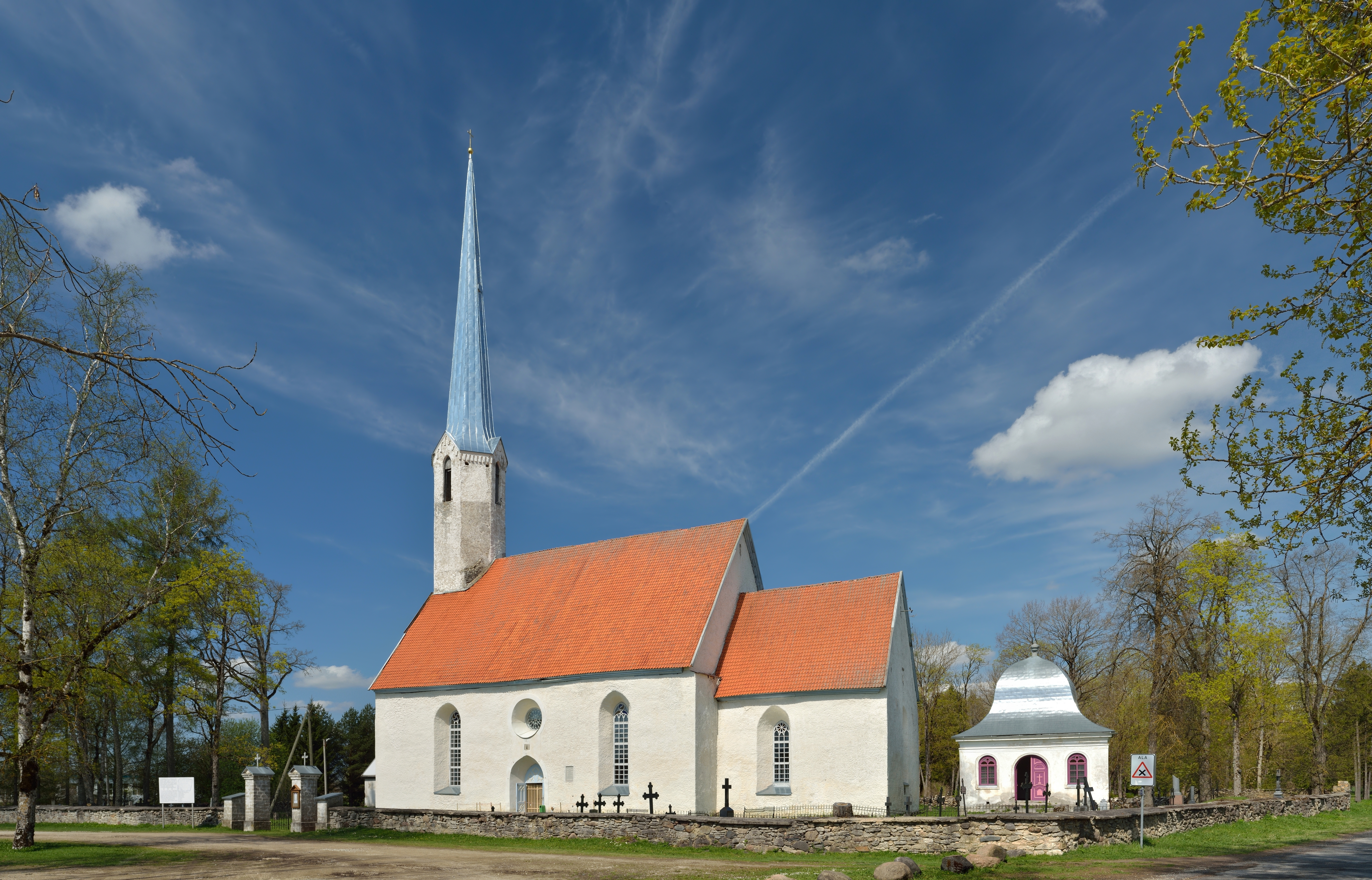
Väike-Maarja Church in 2013

Väike-Maarja Church is a church in Väike-Maarja in Lääne-Viru County, Estonia. Constructed in 1346, Väike-Maarja Church has three nave-halls in Gothic architectural style and was initially built as a fortress church.

The church's organ was installed by Gustav Normann in 1848. A spire, reaching a height of 61.4 metres (201 ft), was added during renovations in 1873.

In 2002, the altar painting Come to me and the stained-glass window "Let the children come to me" were restored by glass creator Riho Hütt. In 2003, Hütt created the "Hyperdulia" rose window. The churchyard includes the tombs of the noted explorers Krusensterns and the Lurich people.

The church has comparatively thick walls: 2.4 metres (7 ft 10 in) on average, and also has two embrasures close to the western-side pillar.

On August 8, 2010, a derecho destroyed the church spire. A new spire was built in 2012.

== Gallery ==
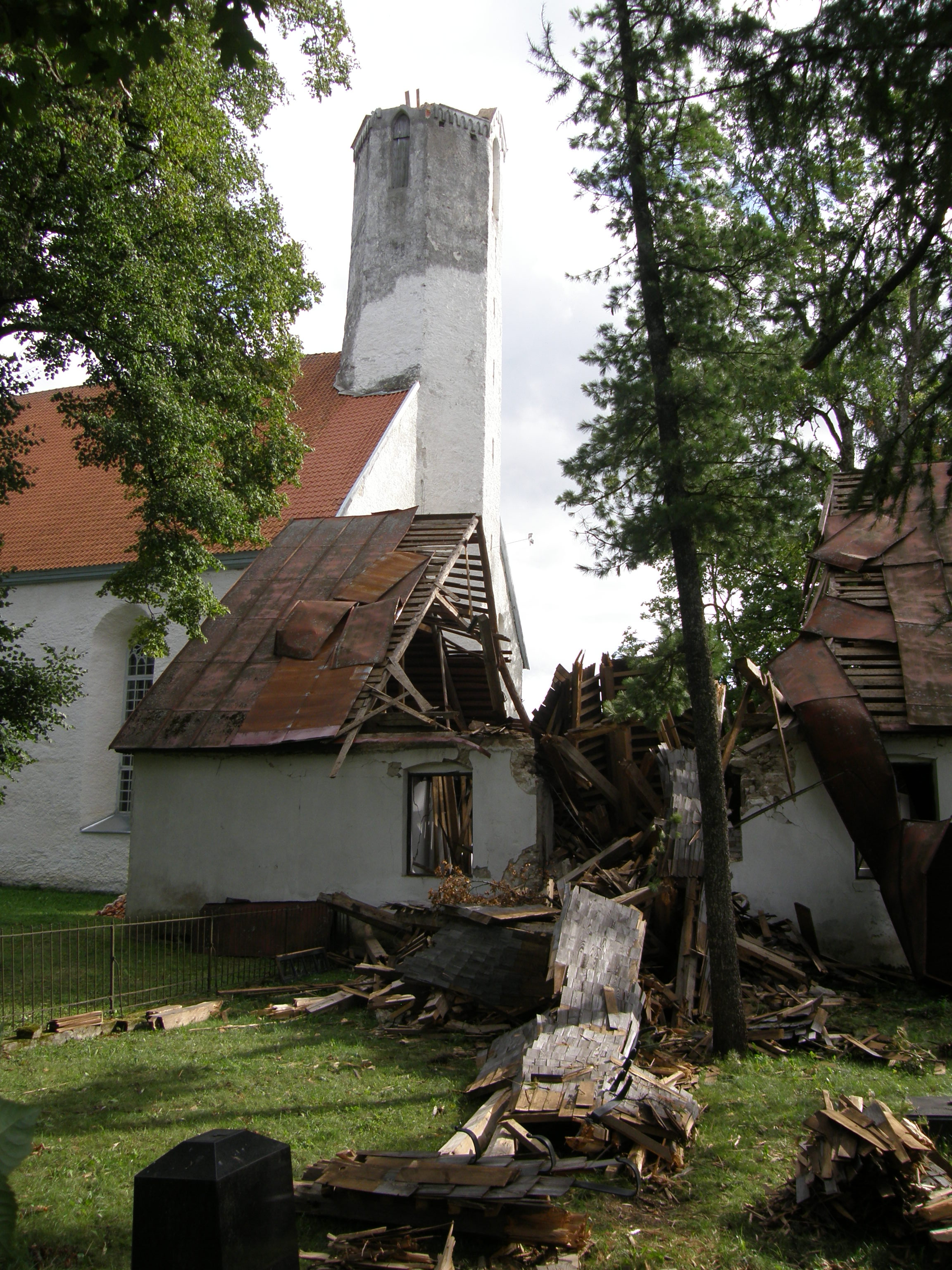
Storm damage in 2010

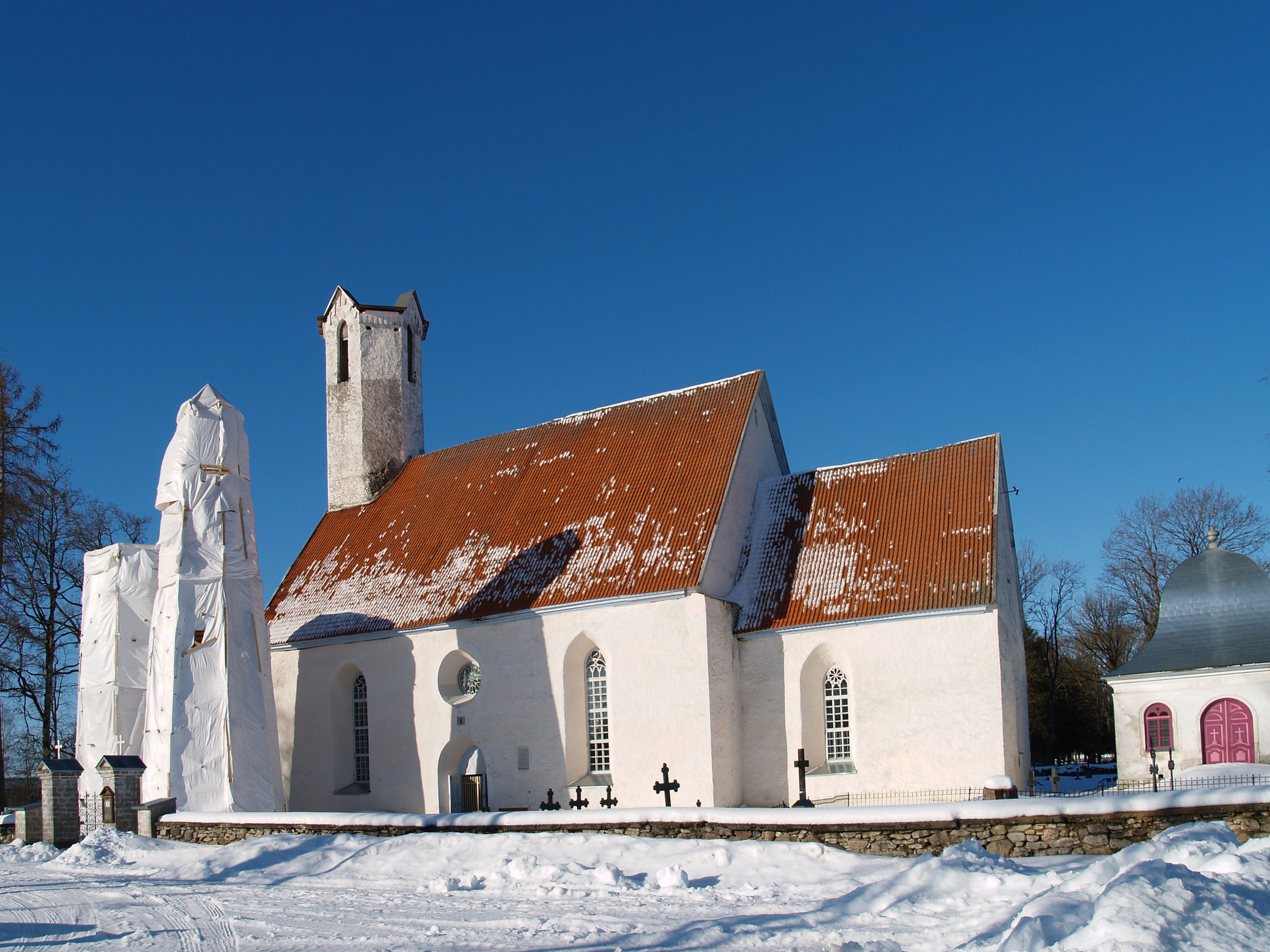
The church in 2012 with the replacement spire ready to be fitted

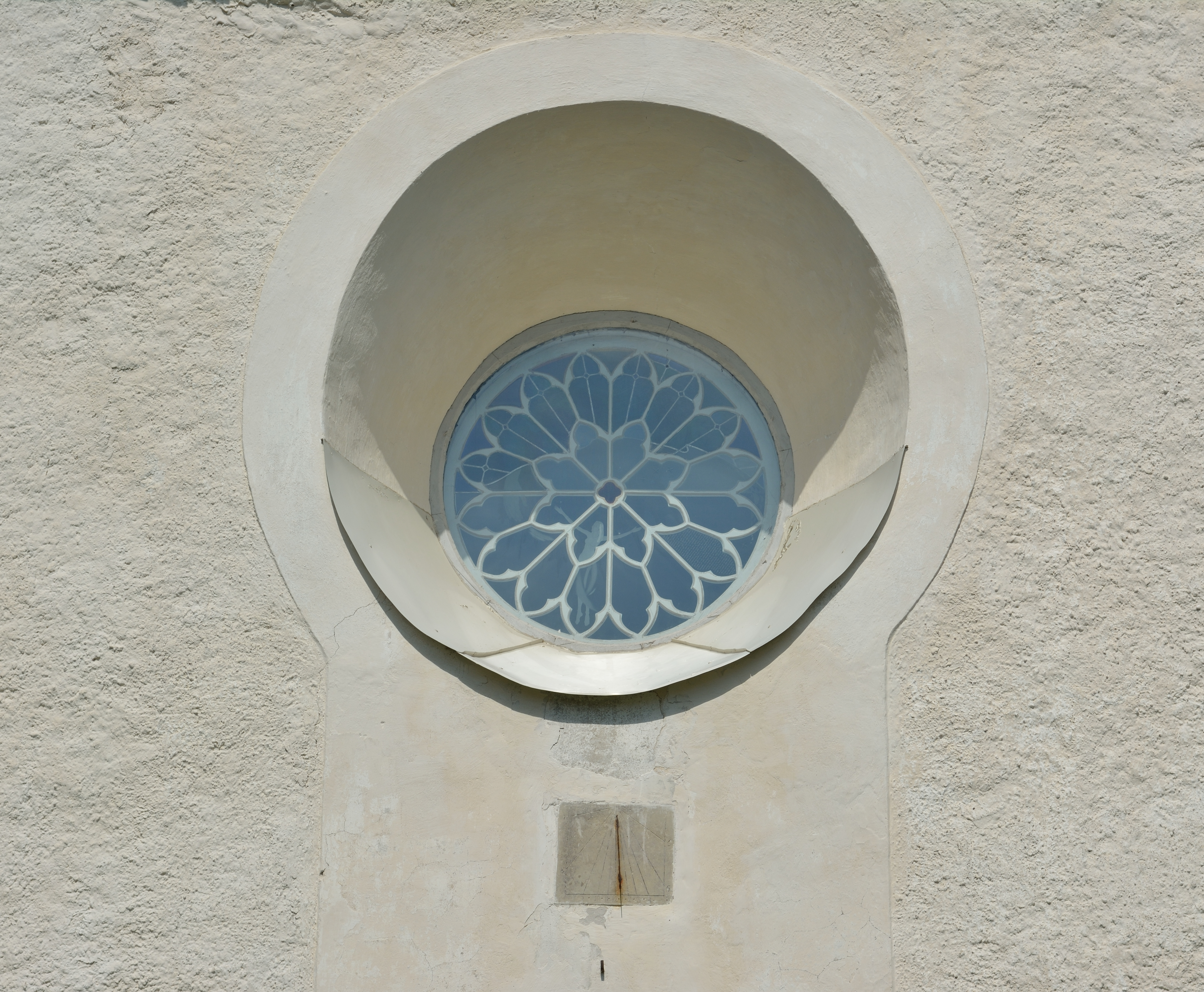
