= Georg Lurich =

Estonian wrestler and strongman

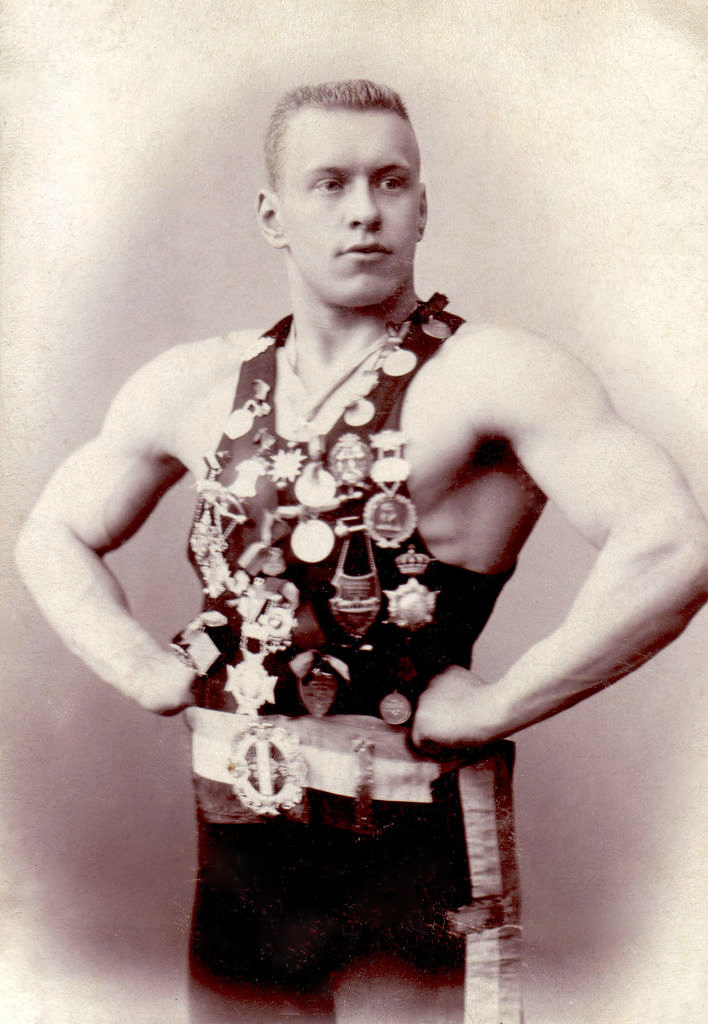
- Lurich, circa 1895

Personal information
- Born: Georg Luri; 22 April 1876 Väike-Maarja, Governorate of Estonia, Russian Empire
- Died: 20 January 1920 (aged 43) Armavir, Russian SFSR

Professional wrestling career
- Debut: 1895

Georg Lurich (22 April [O.S. 10 April] 1876 – 20 January 1920) was an Estonian Greco-Roman wrestler and strongman of the early 20th century. Lurich was also the trainer of Estonian wrestlers and weightlifters Georg Hackenschmidt and Aleksander Aberg.

== Early life ==
Born Georg Luri on 22 April 1876 in the village of Väike-Maarja in Viru County, Russian Empire (now Lääne-Viru County, Estonia), he was a second youngest of six children born to shopkeeper Jüri Luri and Julie (née Rute). Although ethnically Estonian, his family later altered their surname to Lurich after changing religious congregations from a Lutheran Estonian congregation to a predominantly ethnic Baltic German congregation. Lurich's family believed members of the German congregation had better opportunities to educate their children in town schools. Although they changed their surname, Georg suffered physical and mental persecution from his mostly Baltic German fellow schoolmates. This situation was the main reason why he began training his body. He studied information from German-language books in order to learn how to train. Lurich began participating in sporting activities at an early age.

After graduating from Peter's Modern School in Tallinn (today, Tallinn Secondary School of Science) in 1894, he travelled to St. Petersburg, Russia where he practised weightlifting and wrestling under the supervision of Polish athletics coach Dr. Władysław Krajewski. Lurich performed in St. Petersburg's summer gardens, competed with local wrestlers and made various lifting demonstrations together with fellow strongman Gustav Boesberg. His popularity convinced him to pursue a career as a professional athlete.

Lurich became the first Estonian to set world weightlifting records. The Estonian public eagerly attended his matches and Lurich's popularity in his homeland soared. From 1897 to 1898, Lurich toured Estonia and his successes helped popularize athletics in Estonia; dozens of athletic clubs were established. In 1896, Lurich befriended an 18-year-old fellow countryman by the name of George Hackenschmidt and began to train the young man. Hackenschmidt would later go on to make a name for himself in weightlifting and wrestling.

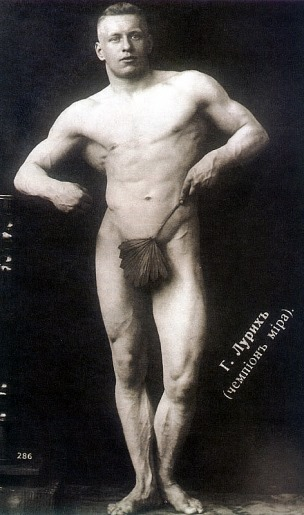
Lurich in a c. 1912 postcard posed to show his physique

== Travel abroad and death ==
Prior to World War I, Lurich, along with friend and fellow Estonian wrestler Aleksander Aberg travelled to the United States to perform for American audiences. Lurich competed in freestyle wrestling matches in the United States between 1913 and 1917. Lurich wrestled American world wrestling champion and title holder Frank Gotch in Kansas City in 1913, but lost what would be Gotch's final match.

After returning home via Japan, China and Russia in 1917, they arrived in Estonia in the autumn. They participated in a wrestling tournament in the capital city of Tallinn that remained unfinished due to the approach of German troops. The two athletes went to Saint Petersburg and on to southern Russia. The Russian Civil War meant an end to work in Saint Petersburg and Moscow. Conditions seemed better in the southern region, which was controlled by the White Army. However, the war spread and the men had to flee further inside Russia. They became stranded in a far corner of southern Russia in the village of Armavir. Their initial aim was to leave Russia across the Black Sea by boat.

Things took a dramatic turn in Armavir at the beginning of 1920. The fighting reached them, the town changed hands several times, many civilians perished, and there were many funerals. A warm winter brought about an epidemic of typhoid fever. Due to the war, medical aid was difficult to obtain. Lurich fell ill first and died on 20 January 1920. Aberg had also become infected with typhus, but managed to overcome the illness. However, he rushed his recovery, caught pneumonia, and died on 15 February 1920. The wrestlers were buried in one grave in the Armavir German cemetery.

== Legacy ==
Following Georg Lurich's death on 20 January 1920 at the age of 43, many Estonians began embellishing his accomplishments with such voracity that Lurich's legend took on an almost mythological light. Folk tales abounded in rural Estonia and continue to years after Lurich's death. The following excerpt is an example of a Georg Lurich folk tale that has become popular amongst residents of Väike-Maarja, Estonia and was transcribed by Estonian author Kalle Voolaid:

"One hot and sunny summer day Lurich had been sitting on a hill slope in Väike-Maarja and when the heat was becoming too much for him, he ran down into the valley to freshen himself up with cool spring water. While running he hit his foot against a rock and fell on all fours on the stone. Then he stood up, went to the spring, put his feet and hands in the spring and washed with spring water. That is where he got the great strength, he had taken that rock against which he had hit his foot, and played with it as if it were a potato. That rock is said to be still there on the edge of Väike-Maarja memorial hill, covered with moss."

In 1912, Estonian sculptor Amandus Adamson cast a bronze statue of Lurich titled "Champion" which won the 1912 Paris Olympic artist contest. Lurich was also the inspirational model for a plaster of Paris sculpture by Adamson titled "Kalevipoeg at the Gates of Hell" (Estonian: "Kalevipoeg põrgu väravas") in 1922.

Lurich remains one of the most beloved figures in Estonia to this day. Large tour groups now visit Lurich's memorial stone in Väike-Maarja on Aia Street. The international Georg Lurich Memorial in Greco-Roman wrestling is held annually in Estonia from 1956. On 22 April 2018, Lurich's statue was opened in Väike-Maarja.

== Monuments and memorials ==
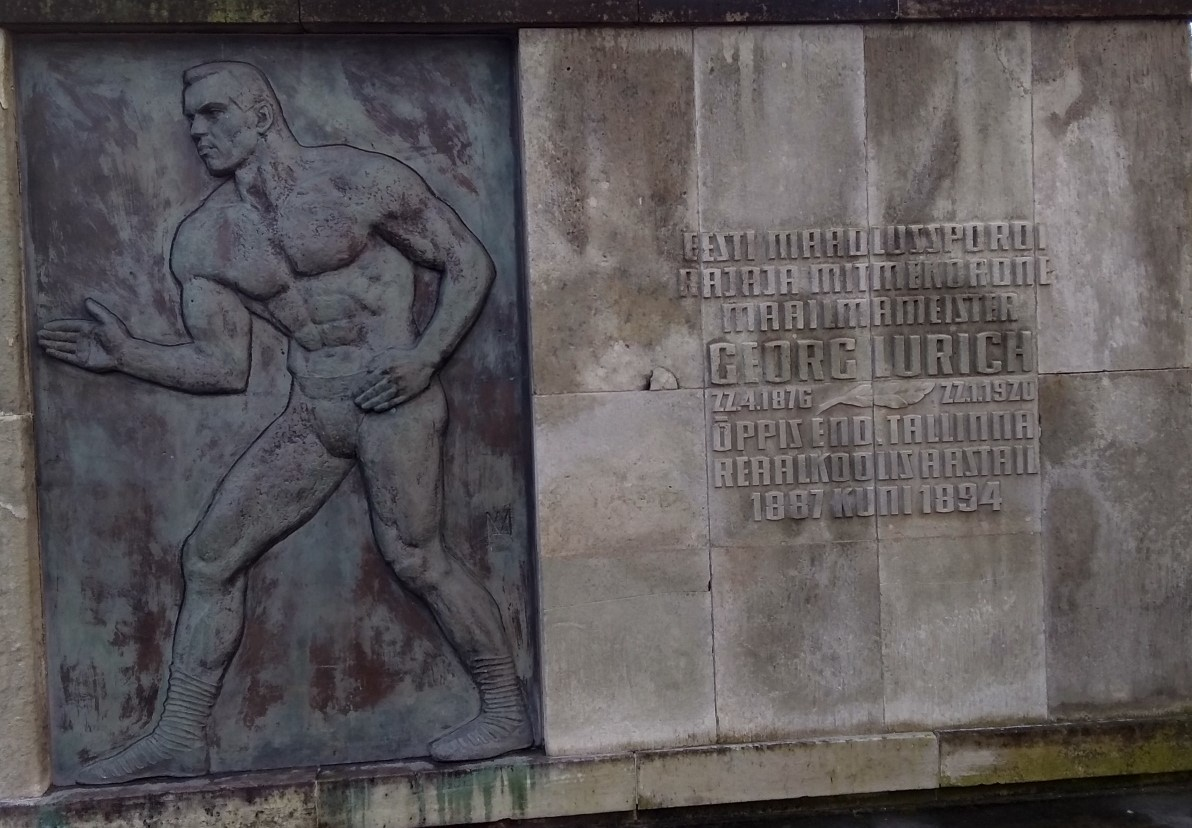
Bas-relief of Lurich at the Tallinn Secondary School of Science (Tallinna Reaalkool)

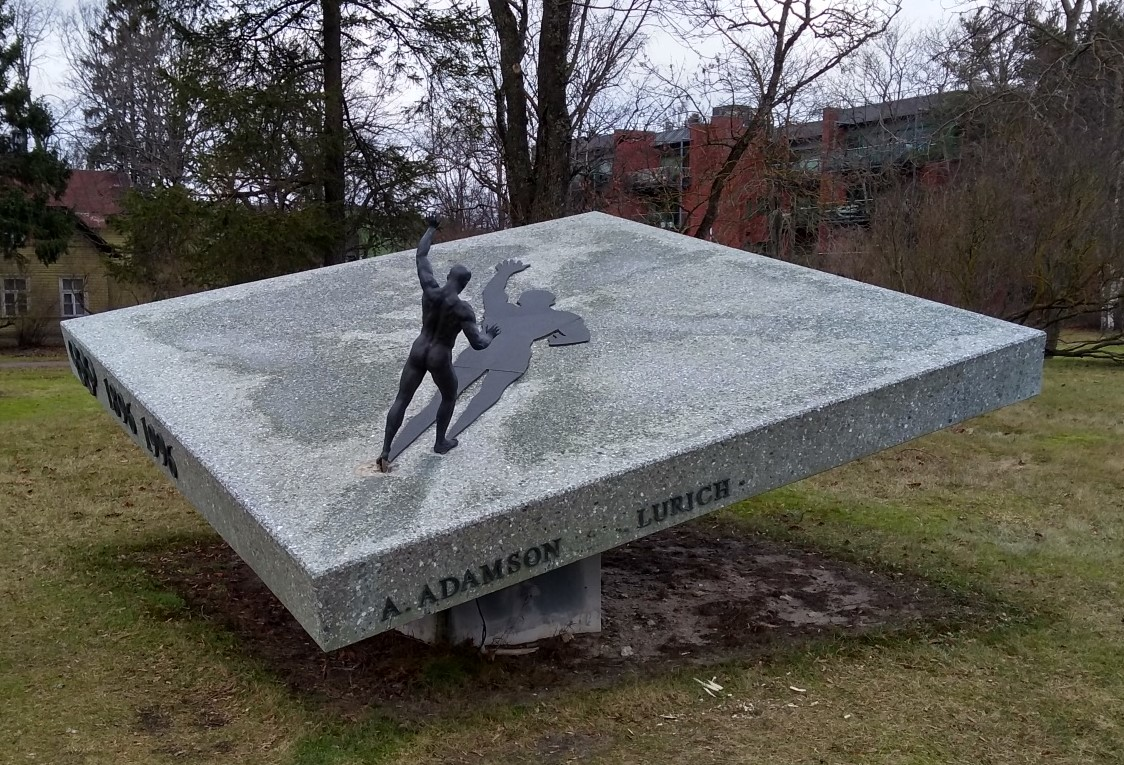
Lurich monument by sculptor Tõnu Maarand, based on the 1912 Amandus Adamson sculpture Champion. Formerly in the Tallinn district of Pirita. Moved to the Pirita Sports Centre in 2020

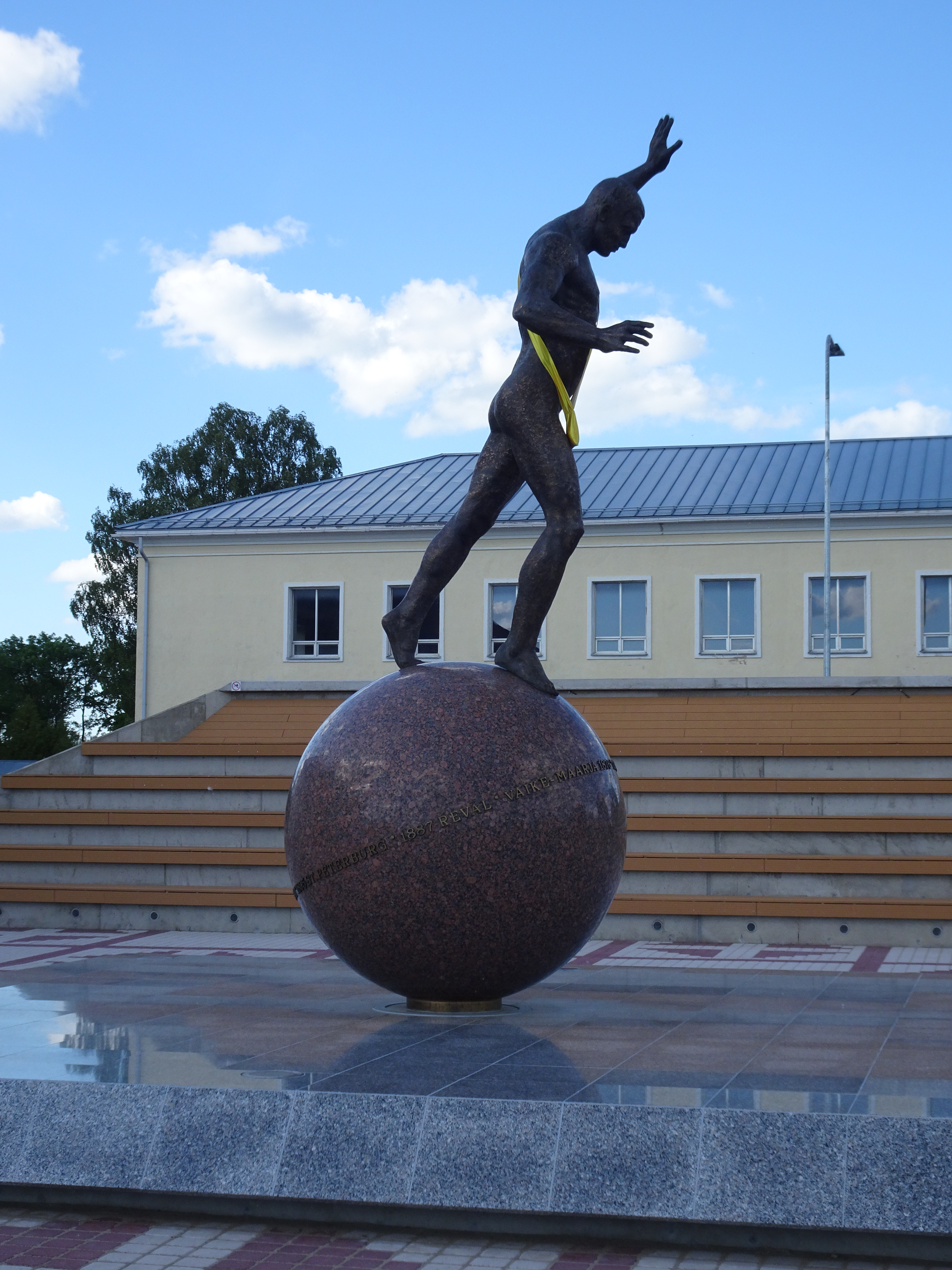
Lurich monument in Väike-Maarja

== Championships and accomplishments ==
- International Professional Wrestling Hall of Fame
  - Class of 2023

== See also ==
- List of premature professional wrestling deaths
