= George Hackenschmidt =

Estonian strongman and professional wrestler (1877–1968)

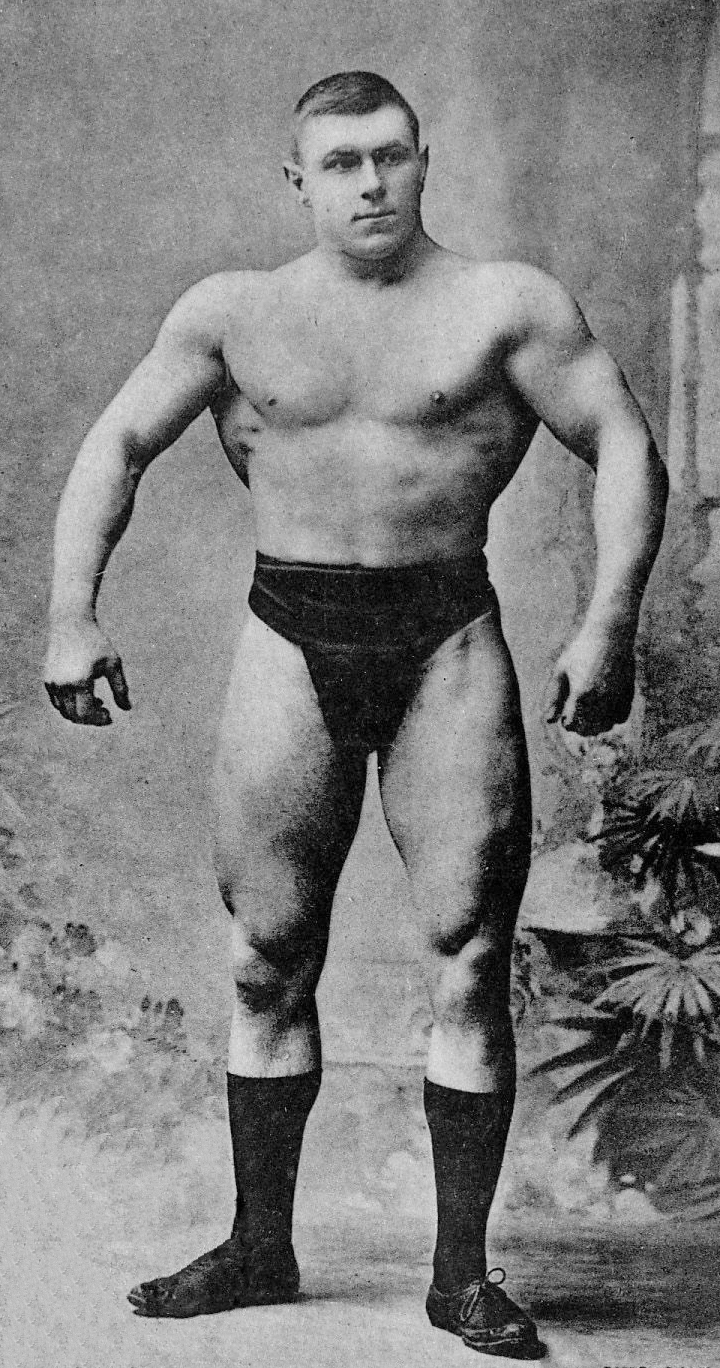
- Hackenschmidt, c. 1905

Personal information
- Other names: Georgiy Georgiyevich Gakkenshmídt
- Citizenship: Russian Empire; France (1939–1946); British subject (after 1946)
- Born: Georg Karl Julius Hackenschmidt; August 1, 1877 Dorpat, Russian Empire (now Tartu, Estonia)
- Died: February 19, 1968 (aged 90) London, England

Professional wrestling career
- Ring name: "The Russian Lion"
- Billed height: 175 cm (5 ft 9 in)
- Billed weight: 100 kg (220 lb)
- Trained by: Ferdinand Gruhn; Georg Lurich; Igor Kraievskiy
- Debut: 1898
- Retired: 1911
Medal record
Representing the Russian Empire
Weightlifting
World Championships
Bronze medal – third place	1898 Vienna	10 events
Greco-Roman wrestling
European Championships
Gold medal – first place	1898 Vienna	Openweight

Georg Karl Julius Hackenschmidt (Russian: Георгий Георгиевич Гаккеншми́дт, romanized: Georgiy Georgiyevich Gakkenshmídt; 1 August 1877 – 19 February 1968), known in English-language publications as George Hackenschmidt, was an Estonian strongman, amateur and professional wrestler, writer, and sports philosopher. He is recognized as professional wrestling's first world heavyweight champion.

Hackenschmidt was the only professional wrestling champion who is not known to have taken part in fixed matches, which were pervasive even in his day.

Hackenschmidt began his professional career in Tallinn (Reval), Estonia (then part of the Russian Empire), and after an 1899 tournament in Paris was often referred in the media by the moniker "The Russian Lion". He lived most of his middle age and later life in London, England, becoming a British subject after the Second World War.

He is believed to be the creator of the professional wrestling version of the bear hug as well as the person who popularised the hack squat; additionally, Hackenschmidt is also attributed as the creator of the bench press. He was known for his impressive strength, fitness, and flexibility. Later in life, he wrote many books on physical culture, training and philosophy.

== Early life ==
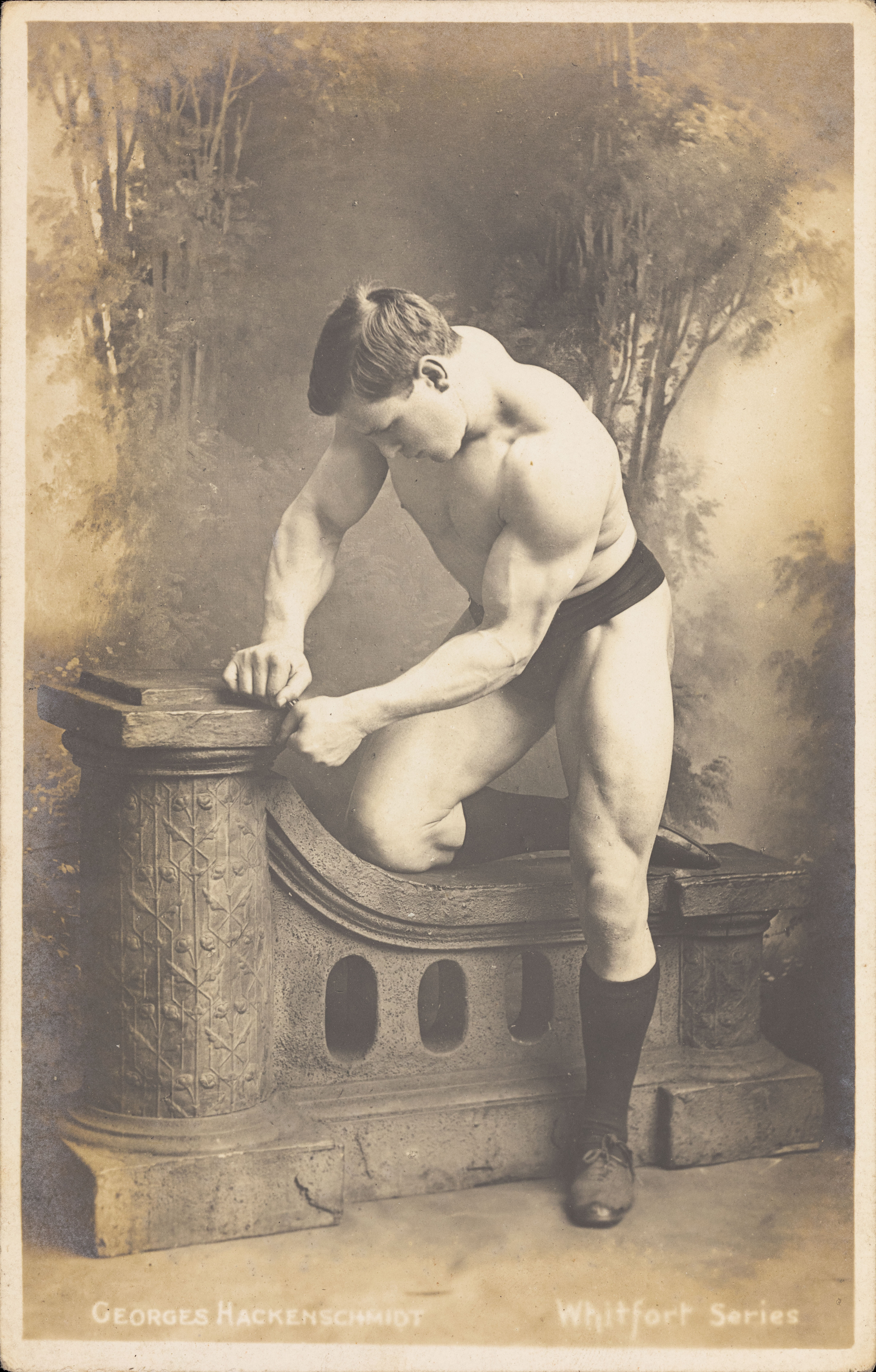
Hackenschmidt, c. 1900

Hackenschmidt was born on 1 August 1877 (20 July [O.S. 8 July] 1877) in Tartu (Dorpat), Estonia, where he lived with his parents, Baltic German Georg Friedrich Heinrich Hackenschmidt (born 1847) and Ida Louise Johansson, who was of Estonian and Swedish descent. He had a younger brother, Bruno, and sister Alice. He later said that neither of his parents were particularly robust in stature or had any unusual physical characteristics, though his maternal grandfather was said to have been a huge and powerful man. His paternal grandfather, Christian Philipp Hackenschmidt, a Prussian dyer, accepted Russian citizenship with his wife in 1845; he died about 1881–1882.

From his earliest years, Hackenschmidt devoted himself to physical development, particularly at the local German Real school (Dorpater Realschule), where he took advantage of the gym. He excelled in gorodki, cycling, gymnastics, swimming, running, jumping and weightlifting. His feats of strength astounded his teachers, as he could lift a small horse off the ground and lift 276 pounds overhead one handed. In a wrestler's bridge, he could pull a 335-pound barbell from the floor to his chest and press it overhead, bridging on his neck. He set several records in weight lifting and was considered both the strongest and the best-developed man in the world.

Graduating from school in 1895, he started working at a large engineering factory in Tallinn (Reval) as a blacksmith's apprentice. He joined the city's Athletic and Cycling Club, becoming an ardent cyclist and winning prizes, but also developed a keen interest in wrestling and weight lifting. The turning point in his life came in 1896 when another Estonian, Georg Lurich, a Greco-Roman wrestler and strongman, toured in Tallinn with a small troupe, challenging any and all comers. Hackenschmidt took up the challenge and was beaten. German wrestler Fritz Konietzko came to Tallinn in 1897, and Hackenschmidt fared better.

== Professional wrestling career ==
In late 1897-early 1898, Hackenschmidt suffered a minor hand injury at the factory and consulted a doctor who was acquainted with Dr. Vladislav Krajewski, who was in the service of Emperor Nicholas II of Russia. Krajewski was the founder of the Saint Petersburg Athletic and Cycling Club, with Grand Duke Vladimir Alexandrovich as president. While observing Hackenschmidt's arm, Krajewski noticed the athlete's physique and invited him to Saint Petersburg and offered to stay with him, as he saw in him the potential to become a professional wrestler. Krajewski trained Georg Lurich for some time and told Hackenschmidt that he had the potential to become the strongest man in the world.

Despite his parents' objections, Hackenschmidt left for Saint Petersburg in the spring of 1898. In 1898, Hackenschmidt trained at Krajewski's and was supported by Count Georges de Ribeaupierre. In April, the club organized a competition in weightlifting for the title of Russian champion, which Hackenschmidt won. In late April, in Saint Petersburg he defeated the French wrestler Paul Pons in 45 minutes. In preparation to performing in front of an audience, Krajewski sent Hackenschmidt to Riga, where he performed under an assumed name as a weightlifter and wrestler. During this period Hackenschmidt still noted his lack of wrestling technique, which he made up for with strength. In the summer of 1898, Hackenschmidt travelled to Vienna to compete at the World Weightlifting Championships and European Wrestling Championships, which were held together. The weightlifting championships were a decathlon (ten events consisting of: one-hand snatch, simultaneous press of two dumbbells, simultaneous jerk of two dumbbells, one-hand press in military style, one-hand press in straddling style, one-hand press continuously in military style with 50.2 kg, one hand press continuously in straddling style with 50.2 kg, two-hand press, two-hand jerk, and two-hand press continuously in military style with 100 kg), with Hackenschmidt taking third place overall. The wrestling championships were an openweight competition in the Greco-Roman style, with Hackenschmidt winning the championship.

In January 1899, he had to serve in the army: he was assigned to the Preobrazhensky Regiment. Demobilized five months later, on May 16 of that year Hackenschmidt defeated Alexander von Schmelling in a fight for the title of Russian champion of 1899. On 19 May he defeated von Schmelling again and was crowned Russian champion of 1899. In September, despite an arm injury, Hackenschmidt travelled to Paris for the World Wrestling Championships. There he received his moniker, "The Russian Lion". After a few matches, he aggravated the injury and went home. Doctors treated him electrically for six months, but it did more harm than good.

In May 1900 Hackenschmidt returned to weight training. In July 1900, Hackenschmidt took part in a forty-day wrestling tournament in Moscow, making his first appearance as a professional wrestler in Russia. He competed for two prizes, and won both, becoming champion of Moscow and Saint Petersburg. During the tournament he competed almost daily against 3-5 opponents. At the Chemnitz tournament, Hackenschmidt met Lurich for the first time in his professional career. According to Hackenschmidt's memories, Lurich bragged widely about his former victories over him. This led Georg to challenge Lurich to a match, which he usually never did. When Hackenschmidt took the stage, Lurich ran backstage. The next morning Lurich left Chemnitz.

In March 1901, Hackenschmidt suffered the death of his mentor Krajewski, whom he considered his second father. On 30 November 1901, the World Championship of Wrestling opened at the Casino de Paris with 130 wrestlers. Hackenschmidt won first place, received two gold medals (for the lightweight tournament and the heavyweight tournament) and 3000 francs. After that Georg went to the town of Alsleben to the trainer Siebert, who helped him to gain weight, which dropped due to the heavy schedule. During this time, he jumped 100 times over a table with his feet tied together. He won tournaments everywhere he wrestled, and toured England in 1903 managed by the flamboyant C. B. Cochran to confront the country's best wrestlers in the catch-as-catch-can style which was regaining popularity. They created a music hall boom in professional wrestling, and Hackenschmidt became a major superstar and drawing card. He wrestled in opera halls, music halls and theaters. As the wrestling boom took hold in England and wrestlers came in from all around the world for the grand tournaments that had become the rage, he remained the dominant grappler, defeating every man he met. Cochran polished his act until Hackenschmidt was a major attraction. He might take on five wrestlers in the same evening, defeating them all.

Hackenschmidt was powerfully built and became a prominent figure in physical culture. He reportedly spoke seven languages and later wrote books on physical culture and philosophy. United States President Theodore Roosevelt, himself a proponent of physical culture and exercise, proclaimed, "If I wasn't president of the United States, I would like to be George Hackenschmidt".

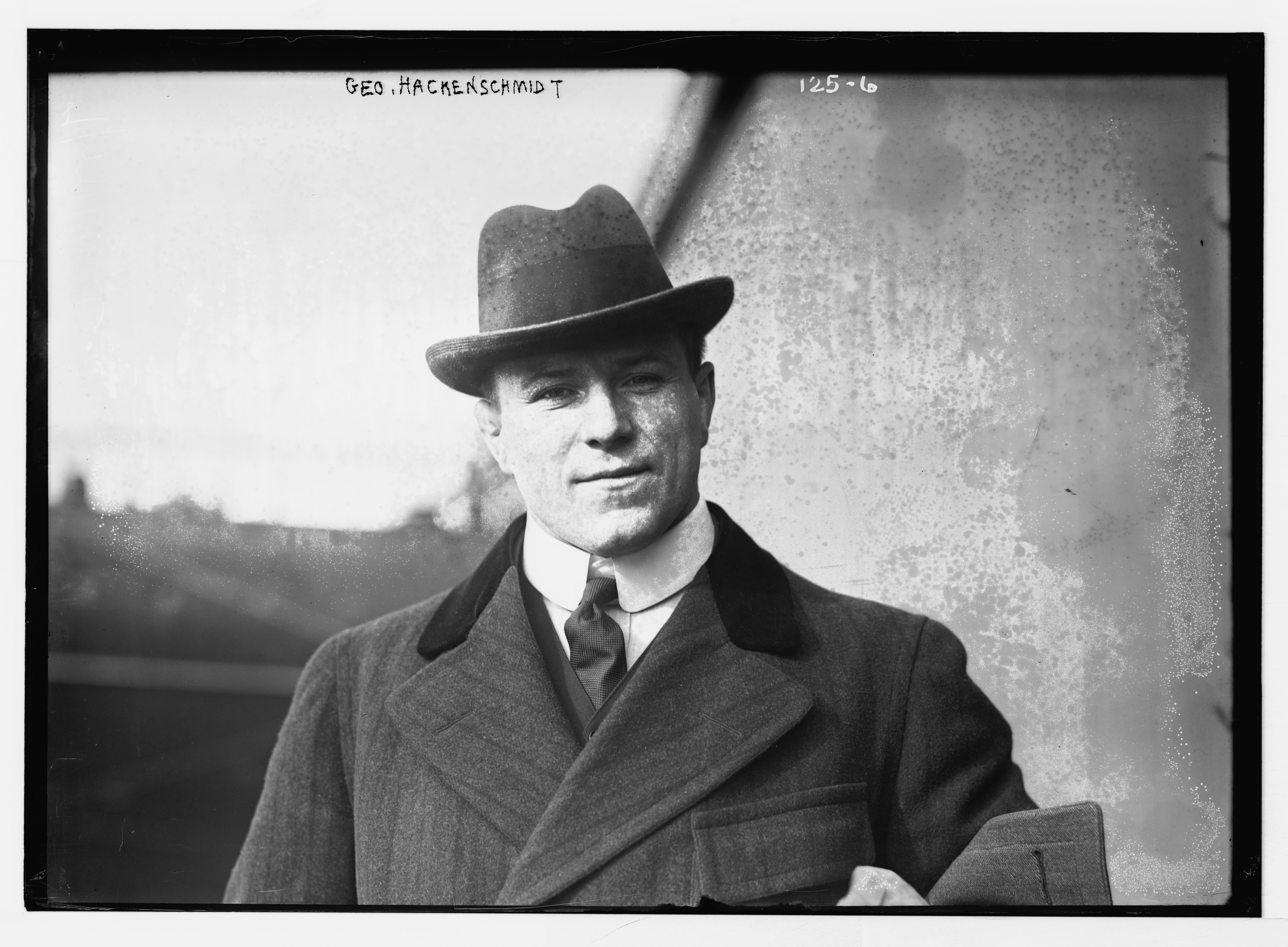
Hackenschmidt on a press photo, 1900

Hackenschmidt continued touring England and defeated the local favorites Tom Cannon, Tom Connors, Tom MacInerney, Jack Baldwin and Tom Clayton. However, when he defeated the Italian Antonio Pieri twice, Pieri sought revenge by trying to find a wrestler who could beat him. He thought he had found such a man in Ahmed Madrali, called the "Terrible Turk", who faced Hackenschmidt at the Olympia London on 30 January 1904. Because of all the ballyhoo, the Olympia was packed and traffic was jammed from the Olympia back to Piccadilly. Hackenschmidt picked up Madrali and threw him down onto his arm, dislocating his shoulder. The contest had lasted about two minutes.

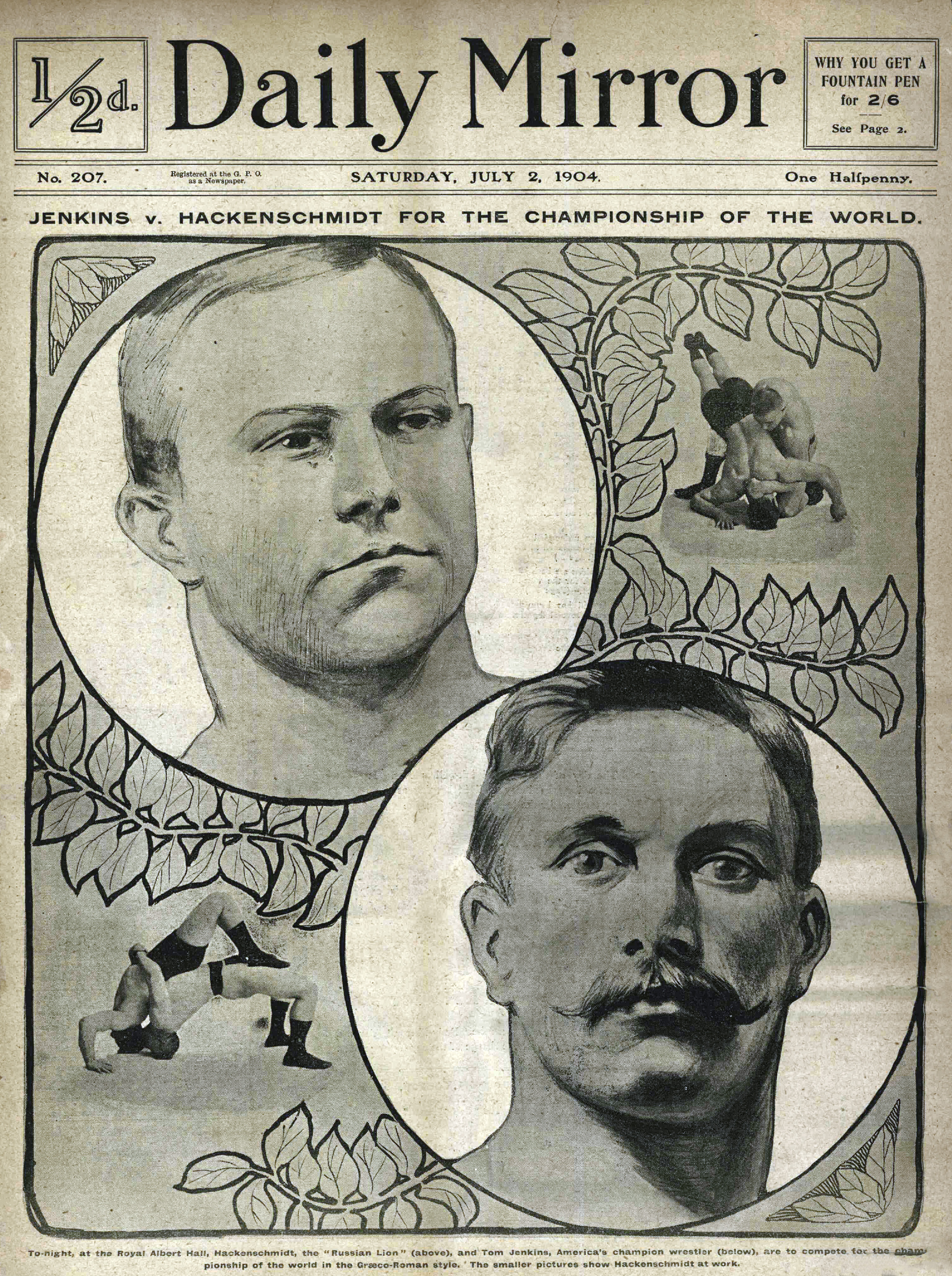
Hackenschmidt and Jenkins on the front page of the Daily Mirror, July 2, 1904

On 2 July at the Royal Albert Hall, Hackenschmidt faced the American heavyweight champion Tom Jenkins, a wrestler who would prove to be Hackenschmidt's toughest opponent to date, under Greco-Roman rules. Nevertheless, he pinned Jenkins in two straight falls. Hackenschmidt left Cochran's management to tour Australia where he defeated the Australian Cornish wrestling champion Deli Nelson in 1905, amongst others. He then sailed to the United States for an extended tour and a rematch with Jenkins at the Madison Square Garden under catch-as-catch-can rules, which Hackenschmidt by now preferred. Jenkins put up a hard battle, but Hackenschmidt again won in two straight falls, the first in 31 minutes, 14 seconds, and the second in 22 minutes, 4 seconds. He was declared the inaugural World Heavyweight Wrestling Champion and subsequently most major league US versions of this title in the 20th and 21st centuries trace their roots back to this match. He then wrestled in Canada and returned to England for a long list of music hall engagements.

On October 28, 1905, Hackenschmidt faced Scottish champion Alexander Munro at the Ibrox Stadium in Glasgow with an audience of 16,000. Munro was 7 cm taller and 5.5 kg heavier. Heavy rain throughout the performance hindered both wrestlers. The first fall ended after 40 minutes and 22 seconds when Munro surrendered from a half nelson. Ten minutes later, the second bout began, which Hackenschmidt successfully finished in 11 minutes, 11 seconds. For the next 6 months, Hackenschmidt performed in music halls, after which he agreed to a rematch with "Terrible Turk" Madrali by catch wrestling rules to show the English public that the first victory was no accident. He took extra catch lessons from Jack Gromley at Shepherd's Bush. Hackenschmidt defeated Madrali at the Olympia London in just four minutes, but noted that the Turk was one of the toughest men he had ever faced.

He then sailed to the United States to fulfill his obligation to meet a new challenger from Iowa by the name of Frank Gotch.

=== Rivalry with Frank Gotch ===
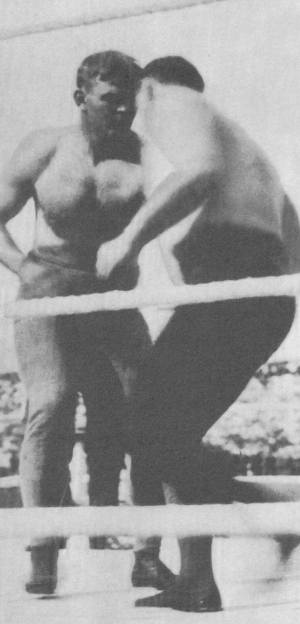
Frank Gotch vs. Hackenschmidt in their rematch at Comiskey Park, September 4, 1911

Wrestling historian Mike Chapman wrote "In all of athletic history, there are a mere handful of rivalries between individual stars that have become almost as large as the sport itself. In boxing, such matchups as Sullivan–Corbett, Dempsey–Tunney, Louis–Conn and Ali–Frazier are a part of boxing folklore. In wrestling, there is only one: Gotch–Hackenschmidt".

After defeating Jenkins in 1905, Hackenschmidt held the world title and remained undefeated until he and Frank Gotch finally squared off on 3 April 1908, at the Dexter Park Pavilion in Chicago. Showing his contempt for Gotch and for American wrestling in general, Hackenschmidt was not in the best condition. Refusing to train publicly at the Chicago Athletic Club in spite of arrangements having been made for him to do so, he was barred from the club and spent his time either in his hotel room or taking long morning and evening walks along Lake Michigan. By neglecting his training, he lost his endurance, which had never been a factor in his previous matches because he ended them so quickly. Against Gotch, who was in peak condition, it would be decisive.

Gotch used his speed, defense and rough tactics to wear the champion down and then assume the attack. The wrestlers stood on their feet for two full hours before Gotch was able to get behind Hackenschmidt and take him down. While on their feet, Gotch made sure to lean on Hackenschmidt to wear him down. He bullied him around the ring, and his thumbing and butting left Hackenschmidt covered in blood. At one time, Gotch also punched Hackenschmidt on the nose. Hackenschmidt complained to the referee of Gotch's foul tactics and asked that Gotch be forced to take a hot shower to rid his body of an abundance of oil, but the referee ignored the complaints and told Hackenschmidt he should have noticed the oil before the match began. The match continued until the two-hour mark, when Hackenschmidt was forced against the ropes. Gotch tore him off the ropes, threw him down and rode him hard for three minutes, working for his dreaded toe hold. Hackenschmidt had trained to avoid this hold, which he did, but the effort took his last remaining strength. Hackenschmidt quit the fall. "I surrender the championship of the world to Mr. Gotch", he said, and stood up and shook Gotch's hand. The wrestlers then retired to their dressing rooms before coming out for the second fall, but Hackenschmidt refused to return to the ring, telling the referee to declare Gotch the winner, thereby relinquishing his title to him. Although he at first called Gotch "the greatest man by far I ever met", and explained how his muscles had become stale and his feet had given out, and that he knew he could not win and therefore conceded the match, Hackenschmidt later reversed his opinion of Gotch and Americans in general, claiming to have been fouled by Gotch and victimized in America, and calling for a rematch in Europe.

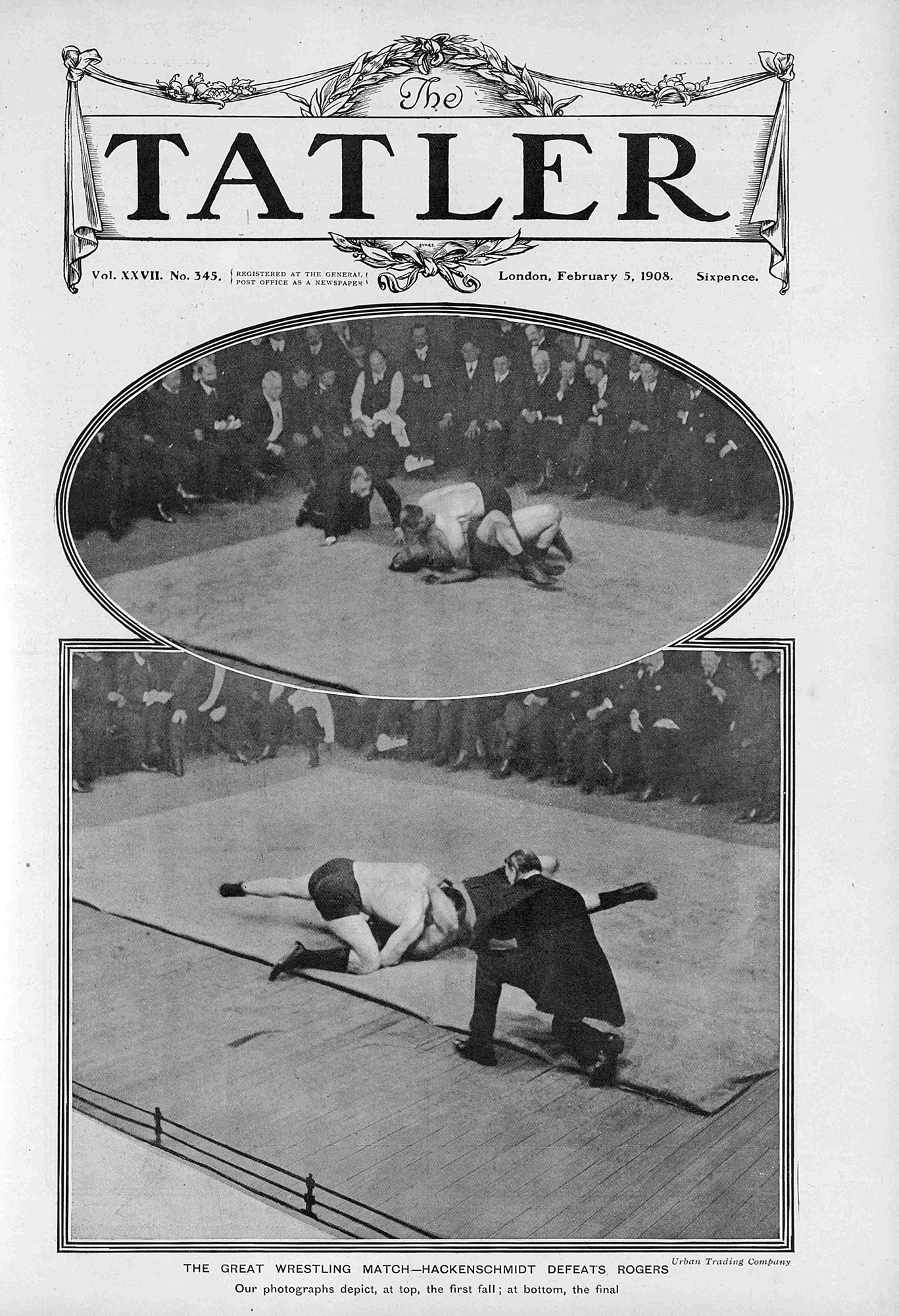
Hackenschmidt vs. Joe Rogers on the cover of Tatler magazine

In August 1907, Hackenschmidt suffered pain in his knee and returned to Russia for rehabilitation. Hackenschmidt failed to heal his knee and was sent back to England. By 1907 the situation in the wrestling world had changed, Hackenschmidt noticed the emergence of four strong wrestlers: Constant Le Marin, Stanislaus Zbyszko, Ivan Poddubny and Joe Rogers. All four challenged Hackenschmidt, and he agreed to compete against the strongest of them, which should determine the tournament. In England, Hackenschmidt attended a match between Zbyszko and Poddubny, which Zbyszko won. Rogers was unable to compete due to sepsis and demanded a rematch from Hackenschmidt for the loss in USA. The contest was held on February 6, 1908, at Oxford Music Hall, where Hackenschmidt defeated Rogers in a short bout. Hackenschmidt was then scheduled to face Zbyszko, but the match was canceled due to knee problems. The wrestler went to Aachen, where he underwent knee surgery, followed by a long recovery. During his rehabilitation, Hackenschmidt wrote that the only opponent he was interested in was Frank Gotch.

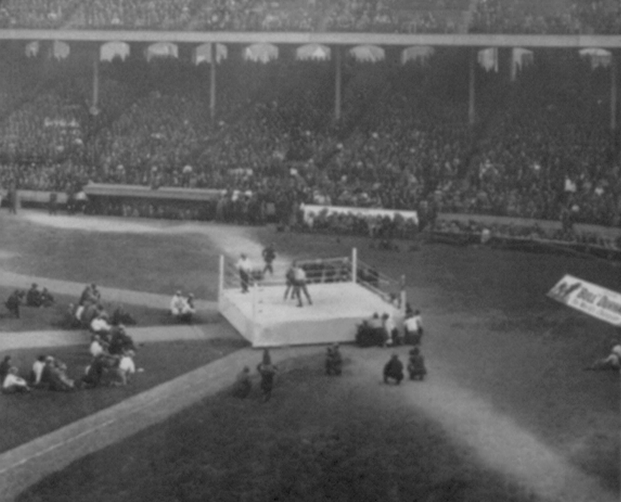
Gotch vs. Hackenschmidt in 1911

Hackenschmidt and Gotch met again on 4 September 1911, at the newly opened Comiskey Park in Chicago, which drew a crowd of nearly 30,000 spectators and a record gate of $87,000. The rematch is one of the most controversial and talked about matches in professional wrestling history, as Hackenschmidt claimed to have injured his knee against Dr. Roller, his chief training partner. Years later, professional wrestler Ad Santel told Lou Thesz that he was paid $5,000 by Gotch's backers to cripple Hackenschmidt in training, and make it look like an accident. However, according to Hackenschmidt himself, the injury was accidentally inflicted by his sparring partner, Roller, when trying to hold Hackenschmidt down onto his knees in the down position. Roller's right foot struck Hackenschmidt's right knee, which in 1904 had developed "Housemaid's Knee", requiring treatment, and had acted up again in 1907. Furthermore, according to Hackenschmidt, his sparring partners for this match were Americus (Gus Schoenlein), Jacobus Koch, Wladek Zbyszko and Roller. Ad Santel is not mentioned in any account of Hackenschmidt's training by either Hackenschmidt or Roller, both of whom offered their insights and accounts.

Whatever the case may be, Dr. Roller did not consider the injury to be serious, and referee Ed Smith dismissed it as inconsequential. Hackenschmidt himself ignored it completely in declaring, the day before the match, that he was "fit to wrestle for my life" and was "satisfied with my condition and confident of the outcome". However, Gotch, tearing into Hackenschmidt with a vengeance, discovered the weakness quickly and took advantage of it. Hackenschmidt was easy prey for Gotch, losing in straight falls in only 20 minutes. Gotch clinched the match with his signature toe hold, which forced Hackenschmidt to concede.

Program from Hackenschmidt vs. Gotch on 4 September 1911

== Retirement and writing career ==
Following his second defeat at the hands of Gotch, upon returning to England, Hackenschmidt was preparing for a match with Stanislaus Zbyszko to take place the following June, but when he began working out he felt such pain in his right knee that it was painful even to walk. It necessitated surgery, but Hackenschmidt decided at that point to retire and pursue his other interests in philosophy, physical culture and gardening.

Hackenschmidt was a pioneer in the field of weightlifting. He invented the exercise known as the hack squat, whose name is a reference to his own. Hackenschmidt also helped to popularize many other types of lifts common within the modern training regimen, such as the bench press. During his career, he established numerous weightlifting records, which were improved upon by others in ensuing decades.

Hackenschmidt was an educated man who spoke seven languages. He went on to write books, including Complete Science of Wrestling (1909), Man and Cosmic Antagonism to Mind and Spirit (1935), Fitness and Your Self (1937), Consciousness and Character: True Definitions of Entity, Individuality, Personality, Nonentity (1937), The Way to Live in Health and Physical Fitness (1941), and The Three Memories and Forgetfulness: What They Are and What Their True Significance Is in Human Life. He also taught physical education to members of the House of Lords and served as a judge at the 1948 Mr. Universe show in London won by John Grimek.

His book Man and Cosmic Antagonism to Mind and Spirit was the personal philosophy he developed while interned as a prisoner-of-war in Germany.

Hackenschmidt was already hospitalized at St. Francis Hospital in Dulwich, a suburb of London, when he died on 19 February 1968, at age 90. He was cremated at West Norwood Cemetery, where his memorial plaque records him as George Hackenschmidt.

== Personal life ==
During World War I, Hackenschmidt was interned by the German Empire authorities in Berlin with his wife. His brother Bruno, who was also a wrestler, was also captured in Germany and died in captivity. During World War II, he lived with his wife in the family home in the south of France.

Hackenschmidt became a naturalized French citizen in 1939, and then became a British subject in 1946. He lived with his French wife Rachel in South Norwood, London.

He was a friend of the magician Harry Houdini and playwright George Bernard Shaw. As he aged, Hackenschmidt also expressed a high regard for his old opponent, Tom Jenkins, by then the wrestling coach at the US Military Academy at West Point. Hack visited Jenkins in 1939 and the two got along splendidly, with Jenkins accommodating Hackenschmidt in his home and giving him a tour of the West Point training facilities. In their mutual admiration society, they never publicly expressed any credit to Frank Gotch, and Hackenschmidt spent the rest of his life complaining about Gotch's foul tactics and his knee injury in explaining his "inexplicable" losses. After Yury Vlasov won and set a world record at the London tournament in July 1961, George Hackenschmidt gave him the medal and presented Vlasov his picture with a dedicatory inscription.

=== Diet ===
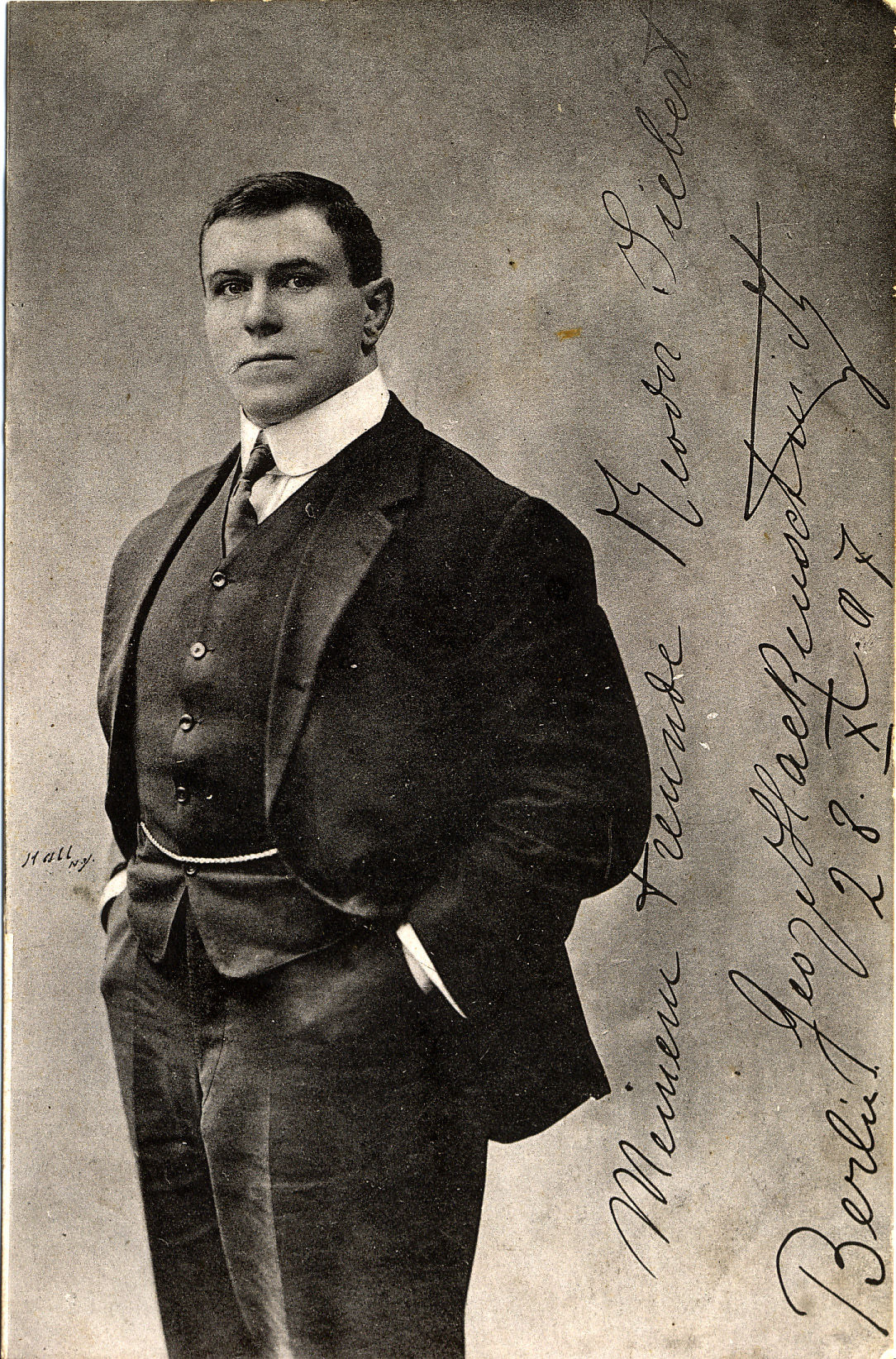
Hackenschmidt, c. 1908

Throughout his life, Hackenschmidt paid strict attention to his diet. He abstained from alcohol, coffee and tobacco and advised moderation in sexual intercourse.

In 1904, Hackenschmidt described rump steak as his favourite dish. Charles B. Cochran recounted that he once invited Hackenschmidt to dine at his flat in Piccadilly. Cochran noted that Hackenschmidt ate "eight or nine eggs, a porterhouse-steak, and a whole Camembert cheese". He has been described as a considerable meat eater during the height of his wrestling career and would eat steak and half a dozen eggs as a snack but did not eat tinned foods.

In 1906, Hackenschmidt told interviewers that he had reduced his meat intake and that a typical meal would be pea soup, meat, vegetables and a rhubarb tart. During this time Hackenschmidt was not a vegetarian but argued that "far too much flesh food" was consumed. He preferred fresh foods including nuts over processed foods.

Hackenschmidt is alleged to have written that he consumed eleven pints of milk a day for training. However, this was later disputed. Hackenschmidt told Atholl Oakeley that the quantity of milk prescribed had been a misprint. After retiring from the ring, Hackenschmidt became a strict vegetarian. In The Concise Encyclopedia of Western Philosophy, it stated that Hackenschmidt developed a "system of philosophy based on the values of spirituality, vegetarianism and self-control." His vegetarian diet of fresh uncooked foods avoided "everything which has been artificialised in any way".

== Wrestling style and persona ==
In his entire professional wrestling career, Hackenschmidt engaged in about 3,000 matches, losing only two. Powerfully built, Hackenschmidt's measurements for his 1905 match with Alexander Munro were: age – 28; weight – 204 pounds; height – 5′, 9½″; reach – 75″; biceps – 19″; forearm – 15½″; neck – 22″; chest – 52″; waist – 34″; thigh – 26¾″; calf – 18″. He also rose to prominence when the governing style of wrestling was the slower, more ponderous Greco-Roman style that emphasized muscle power over speed, agility and ring generalship, and involved holds only above the waist. Being bulkier of build than his leaner opponents, Hackenschmidt's style and temperament were not geared as much to the catch-as-catch-can style. Hackenschmidt was a natural showman, he was honest, straightforward and serious, and he would finish off his opponents quickly. His manager C. B. Cochran had to convince him to extend his matches and put on a show, which in turn ensured more bookings and sold-out shows. This did not mean the matches were fake, as excluding exhibitions, his matches were all on the level, but he might allow a local wrestler to last ten minutes and collect his £25 prize, and set up a highly publicized match for later in the week, where he would defeat his foe handily. Unlike many other professional wrestlers, including Frank Gotch, Hackenschmidt was never mean, vindictive or unnecessarily rough in the ring, "contrasting his physical prowess and fighting skills with a quietness of spirit", David Gentle explained. "George Hackenschmidt was the epitome of calm, self-assurance and inner peace, with full awareness of his own capabilities and thus like all masters of combat found no need for machoism or outward aggression. His tactic to win was skill and speed, born of confidence in his own ability and fighting prowess". However, he had three weaknesses. Against a first-class opponent, of whom he faced extremely few, he could be slow to adapt. Gotch reported after their first match that "every move the Russian made he telegraphed me in advance, which shows that he thinks too slowly".

Hackenschmidt was also given to depression and irascibility. When he came to Chicago to train for his first match with Gotch, promoter Jack Curley had arranged for Hackenschmidt to work out every day before a paying public, which Hackenschmidt refused to do. Barred from the athletic club, he spent his time before the match either exercising in his room or taking morning and evening walks along Lake Michigan, but no serious workouts. The more depressed he got, the more difficult he was to work with, and this all worked against him because, for the first time in his professional career, Hackenschmidt faced a foe fully capable of defeating him. Finally, and worst of all, in both matches with Gotch, Hackenschmidt was accused of lack of heart. Referee Ed Smith, following the 1908 match, said that "deep down in my own mind, I decided that George Hackenschmidt had quit – quit quite cold, as a matter of fact – because there was nothing about Gotch's treatment of him in that first encounter that could by a stretch of the imagination call for a disqualification. There was some face-mauling, just as there always is ... but at no time did the vaunted Hackenschmidt ever make a serious move toward slapping down his opponent, never showed much in the wrestling line during the entire two hours... Again, I say, that as the referee of that match, I thought that the 'Russian Lion' quit". Following the 1911 rematch, one newspaper described Gotch's easy victory and then added that "in the parlance of the sporting world, Hackenschmidt is yellow ... He quit when his position became dangerous". Perhaps the most frustrated was Hackenschmidt's second, Dr. Benjamin Roller, who himself had lost several times to Gotch, but had displayed the utmost gameness and courage. "Hack did not get started", Roller explained. "That's largely a matter of gameness". Hackenschmidt's injuries had not been serious enough, Roller felt. "I have tried my best to make a winner out of him and put him into the ring in the best possible condition, but ... gameness is something you can not put into a man".

== Legacy ==
The years spanning Hackenschmidt's professional career are called the Golden Age of professional wrestling; professional wrestling matches more widely believed to be honestly contested. However, it was Hackenschmidt's showmanship that made professional wrestling arguably the most popular sport in the United Kingdom at the time, and it was he and Gotch together who brought it to entirely new heights around the world. "The Hackenschmidt-Gotch matches were the pinnacle of professional wrestling during the time period and received much attention from media, fans, and celebrities", Andrew Malnoske observed. "They were even described in the 1937 book Fall Guys – The Barnums of Bounce by famed writer Marcus Griffen. To this day, the Chicago Public Library receives requests to view the newspaper accounts and files on the bouts." As Mark Palmer pointed out, "For starters, George Hackenschmidt and Frank Gotch were major sports superstars of the early 20th century. Fans of all ages collected cabinet cards and postcards with their images, read their books, and devoured articles about them in newspapers. Their epic matches were front-page news around the world – akin to today's World Cup in terms of garnering global attention – and helped to launch organized amateur wrestling in the United States in the early part of the 20th century. In fact, a large number of high school and college wrestling programs can trace their roots back to the 1910s and 1920s – the era when Hackenschmidt and Gotch were still household names, and highly respected athletes".

Having already made his mark in bodybuilding, Hackenschmidt caused the major surge in the popularity of professional wrestling in England, and he was considered unbeatable. However, Hackenschmidt probably would not be so well remembered today were it not for two things: 1) his enormous standing in the world of physical culture, and 2) his two defeats at the hands of Frank Gotch. Hackenschmidt remained in the public eye because he had become an icon in the world of physical culture, a legendary bodybuilder as well as health addict, and a world champion wrestler central to a movement that was now increasingly popular. He spoke and published widely on a wide range of subjects, but most notably on health and fitness. His most popular book was the classic The Way To Live, the last words of which read, "Throughout my whole career I have never bothered as to whether I was a champion or not a champion; The only title I have desired to be known by is simply my name – George Hackenschmidt". However, it was his matches with Gotch that ensured the growing popularity of catch-as-catch-can wrestling over the more laborious Greco-Roman that had previously dominated, and this is the style that enjoys popularity at all scholastic levels, private clubs and the Olympics to this day. Hackenschmidt was a major reason for this.

The H. J. Lutcher Stark Center for Physical Culture and Sports at the Todd-McLean Library and Special Collections in Austin, Texas, has a digitized version of a nearly 600-page scrapbook owned for decades by Hackenschmidt and bequeathed by his widow Rachel. The international Georg Hackenschmidt Memorial in Greco-Roman wrestling has been held in Tartu since 1969. He was ranked 35 out of 100 wrestlers for Dave Meltzer's Top 100 Wrestlers of all time in 2002.

== Championships and accomplishments ==
=== Weightlifting ===
- 1898 World Weightlifting Championships - 3rd place, weightlifting decathlon

=== Wrestling ===
- French Greco-Roman Heavyweight Championship (1 time)
- 1898 European Wrestling Championships - 1st place, Greco-Roman, openweight
- European Greco-Roman Heavyweight Championship (1 time)
- World Heavyweight Wrestling Championship (1 time, inaugural)
- George Tragos/Lou Thesz Professional Wrestling Hall of Fame
  - Class of 2003
- International Professional Wrestling Hall of Fame
  - Class of 2021
- Professional Wrestling Hall of Fame and Museum
  - Class of 2002
- Wrestling Observer Newsletter
  - Wrestling Observer Newsletter Hall of Fame (Class of 1996)
- WWE
  - WWE Hall of Fame (Class of 2016)
