= Põikma =

Village in Estonia

Coordinates: 59°09′N 24°39′E

- Village
- Interactive map of Põikma
- Country: Estonia
- County: Rapla County
- Parish: Kohila Parish
- Time zone: UTC+2 (EET)
  - Summer (DST): UTC+3 (EEST)

Põikma is a village in Kohila Parish, Rapla County in northwestern Estonia.

== Notable people ==
- Madde Kalda (1903–1984), writer, born in Põikma
