= Vello Jürna =

Estonian opera singer

Vello Jürna (1 December 1959 – 12 June 2007) was an Estonian opera singer (tenor).

Jürna was born in Väike-Maarja. In 1991, he graduated from the Tallinn Conservatory. From 1982 until 1987, he sang in the Estonian National Male Choir, and from 1987 until 1989 in the Estonia Theatre's choir. He started singing at the Estonia Theatre in 1989. In the 1990s, he also sang in several choirs outside Estonia; for example, at the Royal Swedish Opera.

Jürna performed as a chamber singer in Estonia, Italy, Norway, Sweden, Finland, the United States, and Russia, participated in numerous solo and poetry recitals, was a soloist in vocal works, and recorded for Estonian Public Broadcasting and the Norwegian Radio Fund (including Tubin's "10 Songs" in 1992).

He died in Laulasmaa, Keila Parish.

== Awards ==
- 1989: Estonian Singers' Competition, 1st prize
- 1992: Audience Prize at the Viotti-Valsesia Competition in Italy
- 1992: Estonian Cultural Prize

== Operatic roles ==
- Jonas Kempe (Tubin's "Reigi õpetaja", 1988)
- Ferrando (Mozart's "Così fan tutte", 1989; 1998 in Oulu)
- Nemorino (Donizetti's "Armujook", 1989)
