= Rhubarb tart =

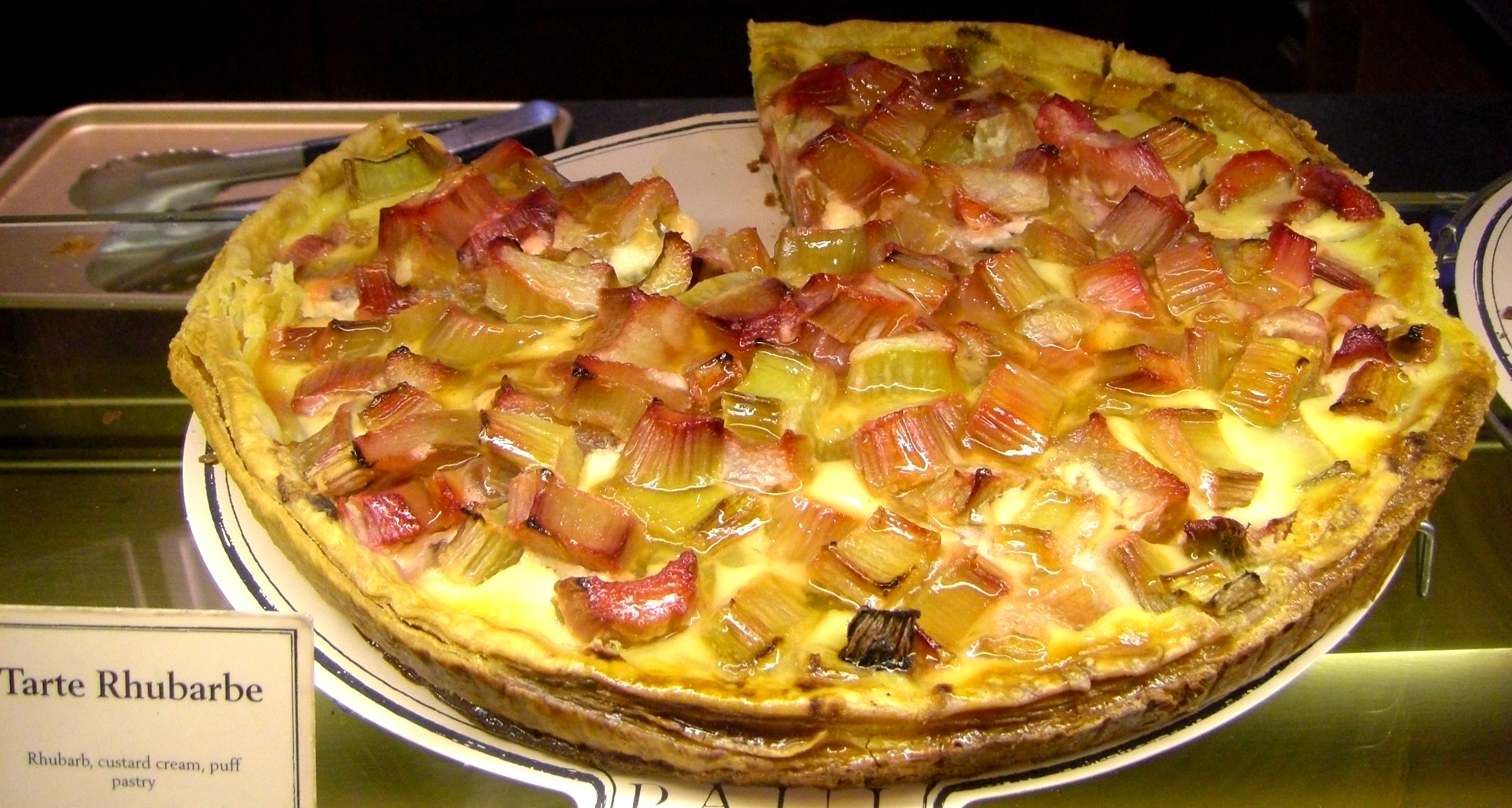
- Type: Tart
- Main ingredients: Pastry shell, rhubarb

Rhubarb tart is a tart filled with rhubarb.

Mrs Beeton's recipe requires half a pound of puff pastry, five large sticks of rhubarb and quarter of a pound of sugar with a little lemon juice and lemon zest to taste. This is baked for 30 to 45 minutes and serves five people at a cost of ninepence.

Rhubarb was used medicinally as a purgative and this caused it to have unpleasant associations. To make the dish more acceptable, rhubarb tart was sometimes renamed Spring apples in the 19th century.

== In the arts ==
Rhubarb tart was celebrated in the radio show I'm Sorry, I'll Read That Again in which it was a running joke. Examples included the pun Rhubarb Tart of Omar Khayyam (Rubaiyat of Omar Khayyam) and The Rhubarb Tart Song which went:

...
A rhubarb what? A rhubarb tart!
A whatbarb tart? A rhubarb tart!
I want another slice of rhubarb tart!
...

== Notable consumers ==
- Friedrich Ludwig Georg von Raumer, who wrote in his account of England that he was a "very industrious eater of rhubarb tart".
