= Väike-Maarja =

Borough in Estonia

- Small borough
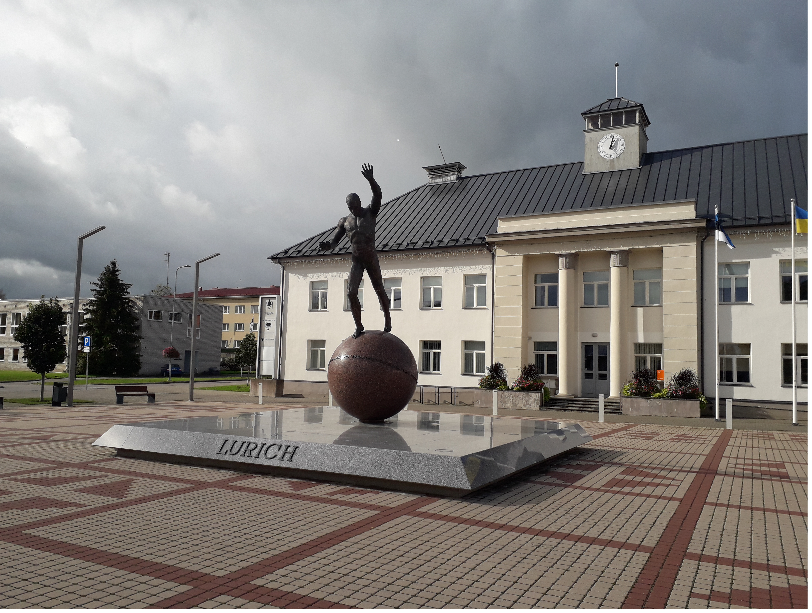
- Väike-Maarja's central square with the Georg Lurich monument

- Location in Estonia
- Coordinates: 59°07′41″N 26°15′05″E
- Country: Estonia
- County: Lääne-Viru County
- Municipality: Väike-Maarja Parish

Population (01.01.2008)
  - Total: 2,005

Väike-Maarja (German: Klein-Marien) is a small borough (Estonian: alevik) in Lääne-Viru County, Estonia. It is the administrative centre of Väike-Maarja Parish. The population of Väike-Maarja in January 2023 was 2,155 people.

== Name ==
Väike-Maarja was attested in historical sources as Weike-Maarja in 1826 and Wäikse-Maarja in 1883. It was known as Klein-Marien in German and as Nienkerken in Low German. The Estonian name Väike-Maarja and the German name Klein-Marien literally mean 'little Mary', and the Low German name Nienkerken means 'new church'. When the area of what is now Väike-Maarja was transferred from ancient Järva County to Virumaa County in the early 15th century, a new parish was established, referred to as the 'new church' (thus the Low German name Nienkerken). The new church was dedicated to the Virgin Mary and, because there was already a church dedicated to Mary in nearby Ambla in Järva County, the parish was referred to as Väike-Maarja 'little Mary' to distinguish it from the former. A similar differentiation was applied to the settlements of Suure-Jaani (lit. 'big John') and Väike-Jaani (lit. 'little John', now Kolga-Jaani) in Viljandi County.

== Church ==
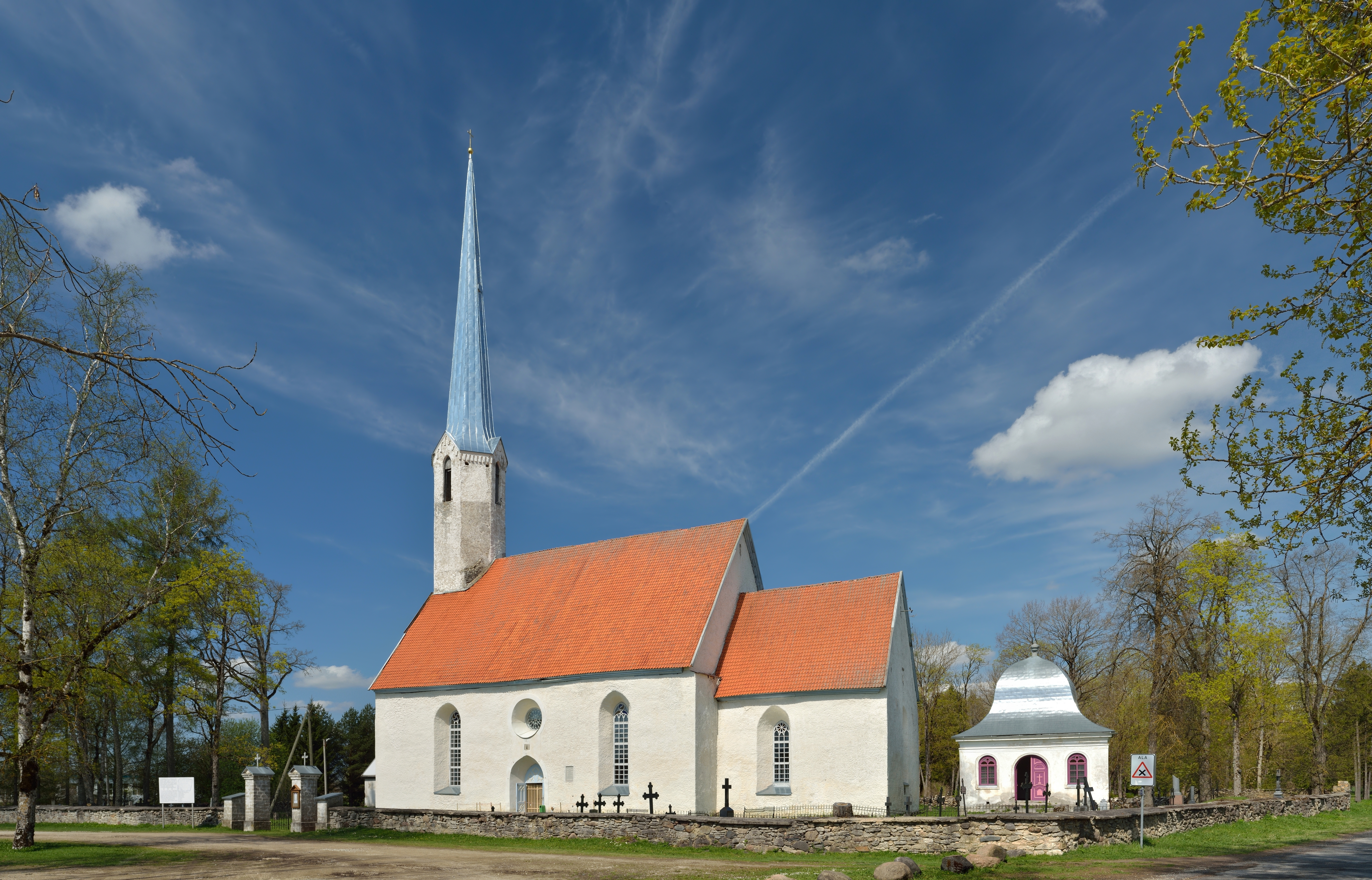
Väike-Maarja church

Väike-Maarja Church was initially built as a fortress church.

== Climate ==
Climate data for Väike- Maarja (normals 1991–2020, extremes 1962–present)
| Month | Jan | Feb | Mar | Apr | May | Jun | Jul | Aug | Sep | Oct | Nov | Dec | Year |
|---|---|---|---|---|---|---|---|---|---|---|---|---|---|
| Record high °C (°F) | 8.2 (46.8) | 10.5 (50.9) | 16.1 (61.0) | 25.9 (78.6) | 30.4 (86.7) | 30.6 (87.1) | 33.7 (92.7) | 34.5 (94.1) | 29.5 (85.1) | 20.5 (68.9) | 12.5 (54.5) | 10.5 (50.9) | 34.5 (94.1) |
| Mean daily maximum °C (°F) | −2.4 (27.7) | −2.6 (27.3) | 1.8 (35.2) | 9.6 (49.3) | 16.2 (61.2) | 19.8 (67.6) | 22.5 (72.5) | 21.1 (70.0) | 15.6 (60.1) | 8.3 (46.9) | 2.5 (36.5) | −0.6 (30.9) | 9.3 (48.7) |
| Daily mean °C (°F) | −4.7 (23.5) | −5.3 (22.5) | −1.8 (28.8) | 4.5 (40.1) | 10.4 (50.7) | 14.5 (58.1) | 17.2 (63.0) | 15.8 (60.4) | 11.1 (52.0) | 5.2 (41.4) | 0.5 (32.9) | −2.7 (27.1) | 5.4 (41.7) |
| Mean daily minimum °C (°F) | −7.5 (18.5) | −8.3 (17.1) | −5.4 (22.3) | 0.0 (32.0) | 4.5 (40.1) | 9.0 (48.2) | 11.8 (53.2) | 10.9 (51.6) | 7.0 (44.6) | 2.2 (36.0) | −1.7 (28.9) | −5 (23) | 1.5 (34.7) |
| Record low °C (°F) | −33.7 (−28.7) | −34.8 (−30.6) | −26.6 (−15.9) | −17.2 (1.0) | −6.6 (20.1) | −1.8 (28.8) | 2.4 (36.3) | 0.9 (33.6) | −5.4 (22.3) | −13.6 (7.5) | −23.7 (−10.7) | −36.2 (−33.2) | −36.2 (−33.2) |
| Average precipitation mm (inches) | 46 (1.8) | 35 (1.4) | 34 (1.3) | 34 (1.3) | 44 (1.7) | 76 (3.0) | 75 (3.0) | 87 (3.4) | 63 (2.5) | 76 (3.0) | 57 (2.2) | 50 (2.0) | 684 (26.9) |
| Average precipitation days (≥ 1.0 mm) | 11 | 8 | 9 | 8 | 8 | 11 | 11 | 12 | 13 | 13 | 15 | 14 | 131 |
| Average relative humidity (%) | 90 | 88 | 81 | 71 | 67 | 73 | 76 | 79 | 84 | 89 | 92 | 91 | 82 |
Source: Estonian Weather Service (precipitation days 1971–2000)

== Notable people ==
- Georg Lurich (1876–1920), wrestler and strongman
- A. H. Tammsaare (1878–1940), writer, studied at Väike-Maarja parish school
- Alar Kotli (1904–1963), architect
- Maie Kalda (1929–2013), literary scholar and critic
- Priit Raik (1948–2008), composer, conductor and pedagogue
- Vello Jürna (1959–2007), opera singer
- Aile Asszonyi (born 1975), opera singer
- Kaido Höövelson (born 1984), sumo wrestler, known as Baruto Kaito

== Gallery ==
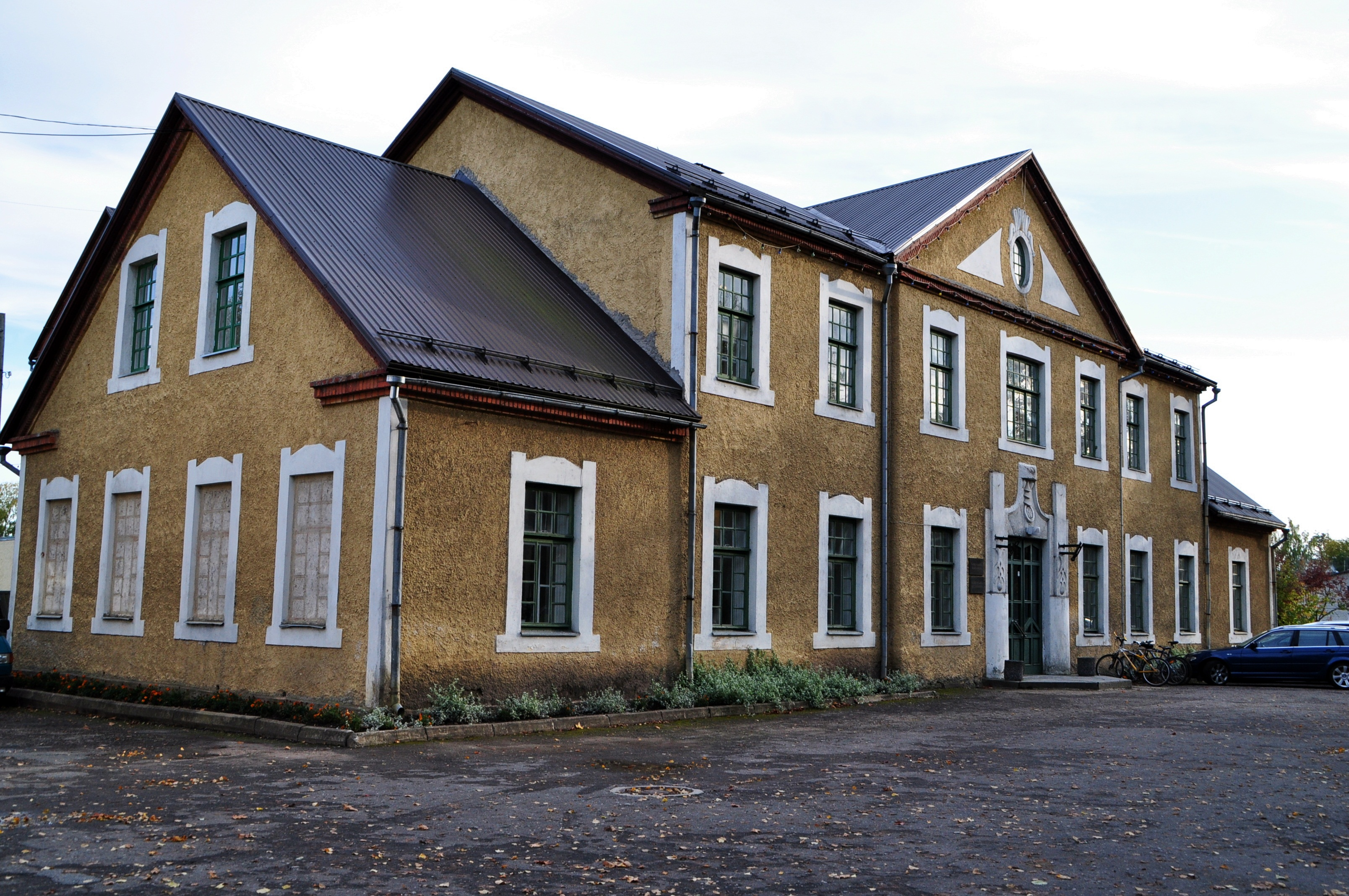
Väike-Maarja society house

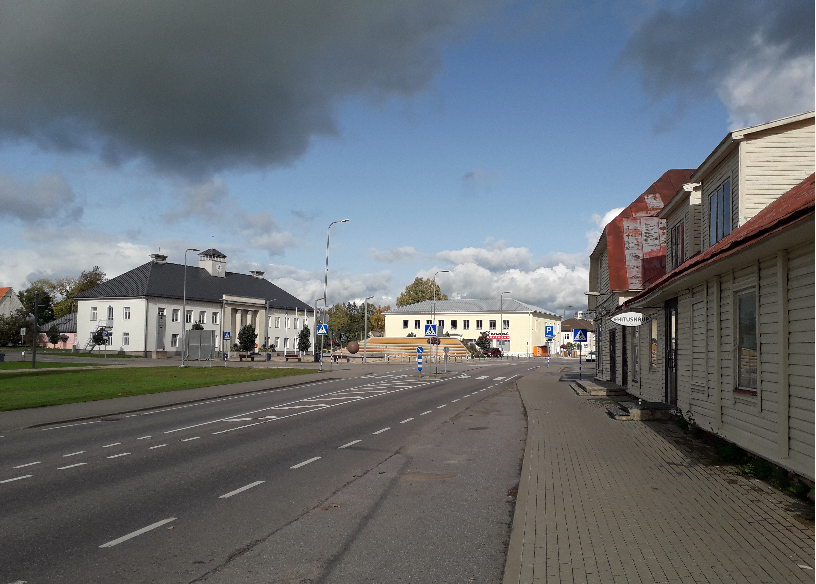
Väike-Maarja, main street

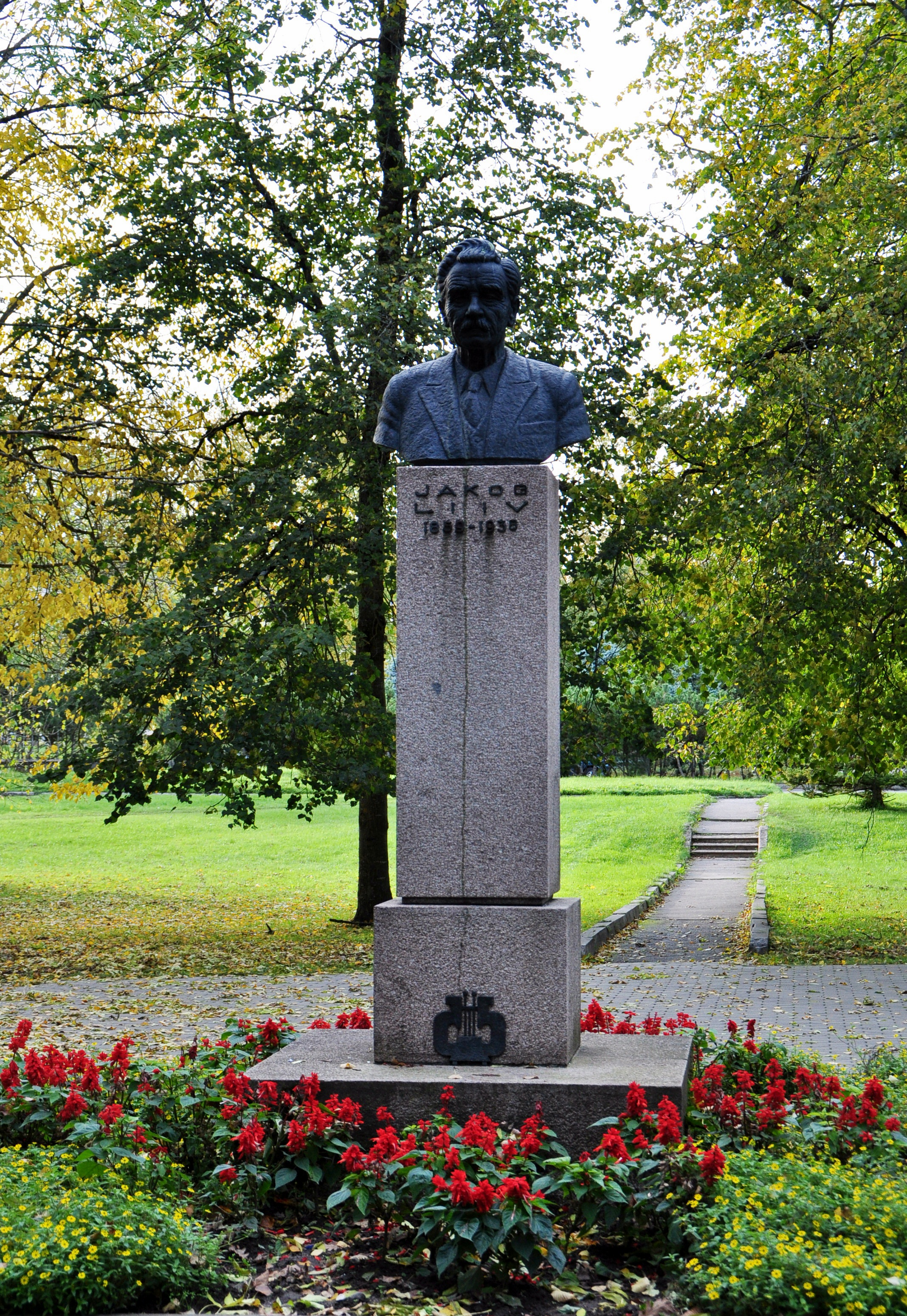
Monument to the poet Jakob Liiv

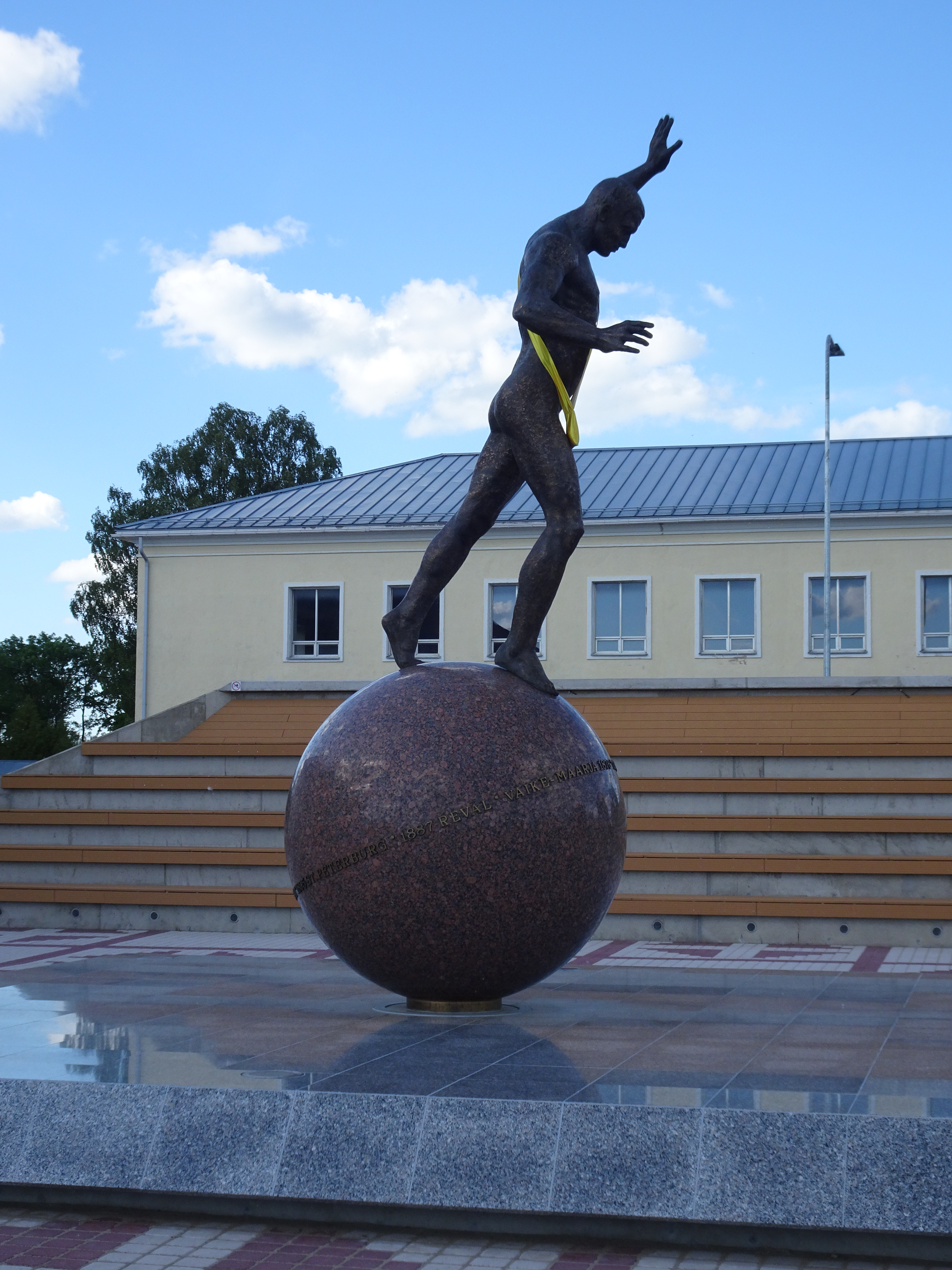
Monument to the strongman and wrestler Georg Lurich
