= Tamse =

Village in Estonia

Coordinates: 58°38′54″N 23°09′46″E

- Village
- Interactive map of Tamse
- Country: Estonia
- County: Saare County
- Parish: Muhu Parish
- Time zone: UTC+2 (EET)
  - Summer (DST): UTC+3 (EEST)

Tamse is a village located in Muhu Parish, Saare County in western Estonia.
