= Priit Raik =

Estonian composer and conductor (1948–2008)

- Born: 9 July 1948; Väike-Maarja, then part of Estonian SSR, Soviet Union
- Died: 27 January 2008 (aged 59); Tartu, Estonia
- Education: Heino Eller Tartu Music College; Tallinn State Conservatory
- Occupations: Composer; conductor; pedagogue
- Years active: 1970s–2008
- Awards: Estonian SSR merited artistic personnel (1988)

Priit Raik (9 July 1948 – 27 January 2008) was an Estonian composer, conductor and pedagogue.

== Early life and education ==
Raik was born on 9 July 1948 in Väike-Maarja.

In 1968, he graduated from the Heino Eller Tartu Music College. In 1973 he graduated from Tallinn State Conservatory in conducting specialty.

== Career ==
His conducting career started in 1970s, when (1973–1982) he conducted a military orchestra. 1984-1984 he conducted the Tallinn State Conservatory's orchestras. Since 1990 he worked in Finland.

From 1982 to 1990 he taught conducting at Tallinn State Conservatory.

== Death ==
Raik died on 27 January 2008 in Tartu.

== Awards ==
- 1988: Estonian SSR merited artistic personnel

== Works ==
=== Works for the choir ===
- "Õnne algus" - text: L. Ruud
- "Valged hiired" - text: H. Muller
- "Õismäe valss" - text: L. Tungal
- "Mulgi laul" - text: K. Kass
- "Pääsusilmad" - text: V. Kollin
