= Maie Kalda =

Estonian literary scholar and critic (1929–2013)

- Born: 19 June 1929; Väike-Maarja, Estonia
- Died: 8 November 2013 (aged 84)
- Occupations: Literary scholar and critic

Academic background
- Education: Tartu State University

Maie Kalda (19 June 1929 – 8 November 2013) was an Estonian literary scholar and critic.

Kalda was born in Väike-Maarja, the daughter of the writer Madde Kalda. In 1956 she graduated from Tartu State University in Estonian philology. Since 1956 she worked at Estonian SSR Academy of Sciences' Institute of Language and Literature, and its successor Under and Tuglas Literature Centre. In 1980, she was one of the signatories of the Letter of 40 intellectuals.

In 2001 she was awarded the Order of the White Star, IV class. She was also awarded the Order of the National Coat of Arms, Class 4 and the Estonian National Research Award, both in 2013.

== Works ==
- "History of Estonian Literature" (1965-1991). One of the authors
- monograph "Debora ja vennad". Tallinn-Tartu: The Research Group of Cultural and Literary Theory, 2010, 472 pp. [About Debora Vaarandi.]
- "Teet Kallas's Tallinn". - Virve Sarapik, Kadri Tüür (eds), Koht ja paik/Place and Location III. Proceedings of the Estonian Academy of Arts 14. Tallinn: 2003, pp 379–393.
- "Estonian Literary Slum." - Virve Sarapik, Kadri Tüür, Mari Laanemets (eds), Koht ja paik/Place and Location II. Proceedings of the Estonian Academy of Arts 10. Tallinn: 2002, pp 389–406.
- "Über makkaronische Dichtungsart in Estland". - Proceedings of the Latvian Academy of Sciences; section A, no 4-5, 1996, pp 1–10.
- "Estnischsprachige Übersetzungsanthologien" - eine Auswahl. - Jynos Gulya, Norbert Lossau (eds), Anthologie und interkulturelle Rezeption. Opuscula Fenno-Ugrica Gottingensia Bd VI. Frankfurt am Main: 1994, pp 27–36.
- "Jaan Kärner as a Literary Critic" (1964)
- "What kind of man is he?" (2000)
- "What kind of animal is this?" (2004)
- "Debora and the Brothers" (2010)
- "From Tuglas to Ristikivi"
- "Kohanevad tekstid" (with Virve Sarapik) (2005)
